= 2015 CONCACAF Gold Cup squads =

An initial list of 35 players ("provisional list") for each participating nation of the 2015 CONCACAF Gold Cup was published by CONCACAF on 10 June 2015. A "final list" containing 23 players for each participating nation was published by CONCACAF on 23 June 2015.

Three of the players named in the final list had to be goalkeepers. The players named in the final list had to have shirts numbered 1 to 23; number 1 was reserved for a goalkeeper.

Teams that qualified for the knockout stage could replace up to six players. The replacements had to have been named on the provisional list and were given a shirt numbered between 24 and 29.

== Group A ==
=== Haiti ===
Head coach: (France) Marc Collat

| No. | Pos. | Player | Date of birth (age) | Club |
|---|---|---|---|---|
| 1 | GK | Johny Placide (captain) | 29 January 1988 (aged 27) | (French Football Federation) Reims |
| 2 | MF | Jean Sony Alcénat | 23 January 1986 (aged 29) | (Romanian Football Federation) Steaua București |
| 3 | DF | Mechack Jérôme | 21 April 1990 (aged 25) | (United States Soccer Federation) Charlotte Independence |
| 4 | DF | Kim Jaggy | 14 November 1982 (aged 32) | (Swiss Football Association) Aarau |
| 5 | DF | Jean-Jacques Pierre (substituted off) (Note: Pierre was withdrawn (and not replaced) following the group stage.) | 23 January 1981 (aged 34) | (French Football Federation) Angers |
| 6 | DF | Frantz Bertin | 30 May 1983 (aged 32) | (Hellenic Football Federation) Aiginiakos |
| 7 | MF | Wilde-Donald Guerrier | 31 March 1989 (aged 26) | (Polish Football Association) Wisla Krakow |
| 8 | DF | Réginal Goreux | 31 December 1987 (aged 27) | (Russian Football Union) Rostov |
| 9 | FW | Kervens Belfort | 16 March 1992 (aged 23) | (Cyprus Football Association) Ethnikos |
| 10 | MF | Jeff Louis (substituted off) (Note: Louis was replaced following the group stage.) | 8 August 1992 (aged 22) | (Royal Belgian Football Association) Standard Liège |
| 11 | MF | Pascal Millien | 3 May 1986 (aged 29) | (United States Soccer Federation) Jacksonville Armada |
| 12 | GK | Steward Ceus | 26 March 1987 (aged 28) | (United States Soccer Federation) Atlanta Silverbacks |
| 13 | DF | Kevin Lafrance | 13 January 1990 (aged 25) | (Polish Football Association) Miedź Legnica |
| 14 | MF | James Marcelin | 13 June 1986 (aged 29) | (United States Soccer Federation) Fort Lauderdale Strikers |
| 15 | MF | Sébastien Thurière | 6 January 1990 (aged 25) | (United States Soccer Federation) Charleston Battery |
| 16 | MF | Jean Alexandre | 24 August 1986 (aged 28) | (Football Association of Malaysia) Negeri Sembilan |
| 17 | DF | Andrew Jean-Baptiste | 16 June 1992 (aged 23) | (United States Soccer Federation) New York Red Bulls |
| 18 | DF | Judelin Aveska | 21 October 1987 (aged 27) | (Argentine Football Association) Gimnasia y Esgrima |
| 19 | DF | Bitielo Jean Jacques | 28 December 1990 (aged 24) | (United States Soccer Federation) Kraze United |
| 20 | FW | Duckens Nazon | 7 April 1994 (aged 21) | (French Football Federation) Laval |
| 21 | FW | Jean-Eudes Maurice | 21 June 1986 (aged 29) | (Cyprus Football Association) NEA |
| 22 | MF | Sony Norde | 27 July 1989 (aged 25) | (All India Football Federation) Mohun Bagan |
| 23 | GK | Ronald Elusma | 9 August 1993 (aged 21) | (Haitian Football Federation) América des Cayes |
| 24 | MF | Monuma Constant Jr. (substituted on) (Note: Constant Jr. was introduced as an alternate player following the group stage.) | 1 April 1982 (aged 33) | (Haitian Football Federation) Don Bosco |

=== Honduras ===
Head coach: (Colombia) Jorge Luis Pinto

| No. | Pos. | Player | Date of birth (age) | Club |
|---|---|---|---|---|
| 1 | GK | Luis López | 13 September 1993 (aged 21) | (National Autonomous Federation of Football of Honduras) Real España |
| 2 | DF | Wilmer Crisanto | 24 June 1989 (aged 26) | (National Autonomous Federation of Football of Honduras) Motagua |
| 3 | DF | Maynor Figueroa (captain) | 2 May 1983 (aged 32) | (United States Soccer Federation) FC Dallas |
| 4 | MF | Luis Garrido | 5 November 1990 (aged 24) | (United States Soccer Federation) Houston Dynamo |
| 5 | DF | Henry Figueroa | 28 December 1992 (aged 22) | (National Autonomous Federation of Football of Honduras) Motagua |
| 6 | MF | Bryan Acosta | 24 November 1993 (aged 21) | (National Autonomous Federation of Football of Honduras) Real España |
| 7 | MF | Carlos Discua | 27 September 1984 (aged 30) | (Costa Rican Football Federation) Alajuelense |
| 8 | FW | Rubilio Castillo | 26 November 1991 (aged 23) | (National Autonomous Federation of Football of Honduras) Motagua |
| 9 | FW | Anthony Lozano | 25 April 1993 (aged 22) | (National Autonomous Federation of Football of Honduras) Olimpia |
| 10 | MF | Mario Martínez | 30 July 1989 (aged 25) | (National Autonomous Federation of Football of Honduras) Real España |
| 11 | MF | Romell Quioto | 9 August 1991 (aged 23) | (National Autonomous Federation of Football of Honduras) Olimpia |
| 12 | DF | Brayan García | 26 May 1993 (aged 22) | (National Autonomous Federation of Football of Honduras) Vida |
| 13 | FW | Eddie Hernández | 27 February 1991 (aged 24) | (Mexican Football Federation) UAT |
| 14 | MF | Boniek García | 4 September 1984 (aged 30) | (United States Soccer Federation) Houston Dynamo |
| 15 | FW | Erick Andino | 21 July 1989 (aged 25) | (National Autonomous Federation of Football of Honduras) Motagua |
| 16 | DF | Johnny Leverón | 7 February 1990 (aged 25) | (National Autonomous Federation of Football of Honduras) Marathón |
| 17 | MF | Andy Najar | 16 March 1993 (aged 22) | (Royal Belgian Football Association) Anderlecht |
| 18 | GK | Orlin Vallecillo | 1 June 1983 (aged 32) | (National Autonomous Federation of Football of Honduras) Victoria |
| 19 | MF | Alfredo Mejía | 3 April 1990 (aged 25) | (Hellenic Football Federation) Panthrakikos |
| 20 | MF | Jorge Claros | 8 January 1986 (aged 29) | (Chinese Football Association) Qingdao Jonoon |
| 21 | DF | Brayan Beckeles | 28 November 1985 (aged 29) | (Portuguese Football Federation) Boavista |
| 22 | GK | Donis Escober | 3 February 1981 (aged 34) | (National Autonomous Federation of Football of Honduras) Olimpia |
| 23 | DF | Johnny Palacios | 20 December 1986 (aged 28) | (National Autonomous Federation of Football of Honduras) Olimpia |

=== Panama ===
Head coach: (Colombia) Hernán Darío Gómez

| No. | Pos. | Player | Date of birth (age) | Club |
|---|---|---|---|---|
| 1 | GK | Jaime Penedo | 26 September 1981 (aged 33) | (United States Soccer Federation) LA Galaxy |
| 2 | MF | Valentín Pimentel | 30 May 1991 (aged 24) | (Panamanian Football Federation) Plaza Amador |
| 3 | DF | Harold Cummings | 1 March 1992 (aged 23) | (Colombian Football Federation) Santa Fe |
| 4 | MF | Alfredo Stephens | 25 December 1994 (aged 20) | (Panamanian Football Federation) Chorrillo |
| 5 | DF | Román Torres (captain) | 20 March 1986 (aged 29) | (Colombian Football Federation) Millonarios |
| 6 | MF | Gabriel Gomez | 29 May 1984 (aged 31) | (Costa Rican Football Federation) Herediano |
| 7 | FW | Blas Pérez | 13 March 1981 (aged 34) | (United States Soccer Federation) FC Dallas |
| 8 | FW | Gabriel Torres | 31 October 1988 (aged 26) | (United States Soccer Federation) Colorado Rapids |
| 9 | FW | Roberto Nurse | 16 December 1983 (aged 31) | (Mexican Football Federation) Sinaloa |
| 10 | FW | Luis Tejada | 28 March 1982 (aged 33) | (Peruvian Football Federation) Juan Aurich |
| 11 | MF | Armando Cooper | 26 November 1987 (aged 27) | (German Football Association) FC St. Pauli |
| 12 | GK | Luis Mejía | 16 March 1991 (aged 24) | (Uruguayan Football Association) Fénix |
| 13 | DF | Adolfo Machado | 14 February 1985 (aged 30) | (Costa Rican Football Federation) Saprissa |
| 14 | MF | Miguel Camargo | 9 May 1993 (aged 22) | (Panamanian Football Federation) Chorrilo |
| 15 | DF | Erick Davis | 31 March 1991 (aged 24) | (Panamanian Football Federation) San Miguelito |
| 16 | FW | Rolando Blackburn | 9 January 1990 (aged 25) | (National Football Federation of Guatemala) Comunicaciones |
| 17 | DF | Luis Henríquez | 23 November 1981 (aged 33) | (Polish Football Association) Lech Poznań |
| 18 | MF | Darwin Pinzón | 2 April 1994 (aged 21) | (Panamanian Football Federation) San Miguelito |
| 19 | MF | Alberto Quintero | 18 December 1987 (aged 27) | (Mexican Football Federation) BUAP |
| 20 | MF | Aníbal Godoy | 10 February 1990 (aged 25) | (Hungarian Football Federation) Budapest Honvéd |
| 21 | GK | Jose Calderón | 14 August 1985 (aged 29) | (National Football Federation of Guatemala) Coatepeque |
| 22 | FW | Abdiel Arroyo | 13 December 1993 (aged 21) | (Panamanian Football Federation) Árabe Unido |
| 23 | DF | Ángel Patrick | 27 February 1992 (aged 23) | (Panamanian Football Federation) Árabe Unido |

=== United States ===
Head coach: (Germany) Jürgen Klinsmann

| No. | Pos. | Player | Date of birth (age) | Club |
|---|---|---|---|---|
| 1 | GK | Brad Guzan | 9 September 1984 (aged 30) | (The Football Association) Aston Villa |
| 2 | DF | DeAndre Yedlin | 9 July 1993 (aged 21) | (The Football Association) Tottenham Hotspur |
| 3 | DF | Omar Gonzalez | 11 October 1988 (aged 26) | (United States Soccer Federation) LA Galaxy |
| 4 | MF | Michael Bradley (captain) | 31 July 1987 (aged 27) | (Canadian Soccer Association) Toronto FC |
| 5 | MF | Kyle Beckerman | 23 April 1982 (aged 33) | (United States Soccer Federation) Real Salt Lake |
| 6 | DF | John Brooks | 28 January 1993 (aged 22) | (German Football Association) Hertha BSC |
| 7 | MF | Alfredo Morales (substituted off) (Note: Morales was replaced following the group stage.) | 12 May 1990 (aged 25) | (German Football Association) FC Ingolstadt |
| 8 | FW | Clint Dempsey | 9 March 1983 (aged 32) | (United States Soccer Federation) Seattle Sounders FC |
| 9 | FW | Aron Jóhannsson | 10 November 1990 (aged 24) | (Royal Dutch Football Association) AZ |
| 10 | MF | Mix Diskerud | 2 October 1990 (aged 24) | (United States Soccer Federation) New York City FC |
| 11 | MF | Alejandro Bedoya | 29 April 1987 (aged 28) | (French Football Federation) Nantes |
| 12 | GK | Nick Rimando | 17 June 1979 (aged 36) | (United States Soccer Federation) Real Salt Lake |
| 13 | DF | Ventura Alvarado | 16 August 1992 (aged 22) | (Mexican Football Federation) América |
| 14 | DF | Greg Garza (substituted off) (Note: Garza was replaced following the group stage.) | 16 August 1991 (aged 23) | (Mexican Football Federation) Tijuana |
| 15 | DF | Tim Ream | 5 October 1987 (aged 27) | (The Football Association) Bolton Wanderers |
| 16 | DF | Brad Evans | 20 April 1985 (aged 30) | (United States Soccer Federation) Seattle Sounders FC |
| 17 | FW | Jozy Altidore (substituted off) (Note: Altidore was replaced following the group stage.) | 6 November 1989 (aged 25) | (Canadian Soccer Association) Toronto FC |
| 18 | FW | Chris Wondolowski | 28 January 1983 (aged 32) | (United States Soccer Federation) San Jose Earthquakes |
| 19 | MF | Graham Zusi | 18 August 1986 (aged 28) | (United States Soccer Federation) Sporting Kansas City |
| 20 | MF | Gyasi Zardes | 2 September 1991 (aged 23) | (United States Soccer Federation) LA Galaxy |
| 21 | DF | Timothy Chandler | 29 March 1990 (aged 25) | (German Football Association) Eintracht Frankfurt |
| 22 | GK | William Yarbrough | 20 March 1989 (aged 26) | (Mexican Football Federation) León |
| 23 | MF | Fabian Johnson | 11 December 1987 (aged 27) | (German Football Association) Borussia Mönchengladbach |
| 24 | MF | Joe Corona (substituted on) (Note: Corona was introduced as an alternate player following the group stage.) | 9 July 1990 (aged 24) | (Mexican Football Federation) Tijuana |
| 25 | DF | DaMarcus Beasley (substituted on) (Note: Beasley was introduced as an alternate player following the group stage.) | 24 May 1982 (aged 33) | (United States Soccer Federation) Houston Dynamo |
| 26 | FW | Alan Gordon (substituted on) (Note: Gordon was introduced as an alternate player following the group stage.) | 16 October 1981 (aged 33) | (United States Soccer Federation) LA Galaxy |

== Group B ==
=== Canada ===
Head coach: (Spain) Benito Floro

| No. | Pos. | Player | Date of birth (age) | Club |
|---|---|---|---|---|
| 1 | GK | Lars Hirschfeld | 17 October 1978 (aged 36) | (Norwegian Football Federation) Vålerenga |
| 2 | DF | Nikolas Ledgerwood | 16 January 1985 (aged 30) | (German Football Association) Energie Cottbus |
| 3 | DF | Ashtone Morgan | 9 February 1991 (aged 24) | (Canadian Soccer Association) Toronto FC |
| 4 | DF | André Hainault | 17 June 1986 (aged 29) | (German Football Association) VfR Aalen |
| 5 | MF | David Edgar | 19 May 1987 (aged 28) | (The Football Association) Birmingham City |
| 6 | MF | Julian de Guzman (captain) | 25 March 1981 (aged 34) | (Canadian Soccer Association) Ottawa Fury FC |
| 7 | MF | Russell Teibert | 22 December 1992 (aged 22) | (Canadian Soccer Association) Vancouver Whitecaps FC |
| 8 | MF | Kyle Bekker | 2 September 1990 (aged 24) | (United States Soccer Federation) FC Dallas |
| 9 | FW | Tosaint Ricketts | 6 August 1987 (aged 27) | (Israel Football Association) Hapoel Haifa |
| 10 | FW | Simeon Jackson | 28 March 1987 (aged 28) | (The Football Association) Coventry City |
| 11 | FW | Marcus Haber | 11 January 1989 (aged 26) | (The Football Association) Crewe Alexandra |
| 12 | DF | Dejan Jakovic | 16 July 1985 (aged 29) | (Japan Football Association) Shimizu S-Pulse |
| 13 | MF | Jonathan Osorio | 12 June 1992 (aged 23) | (Canadian Soccer Association) Toronto FC |
| 14 | MF | Samuel Piette | 12 November 1994 (aged 20) | (Royal Spanish Football Federation) Deportivo La Coruña |
| 15 | DF | Adam Straith | 11 September 1990 (aged 24) | (Norwegian Football Federation) Fredrikstad |
| 16 | MF | Maxim Tissot | 13 April 1992 (aged 23) | (Canadian Soccer Association) Montreal Impact |
| 17 | MF | Marcel de Jong | 15 October 1986 (aged 28) | (United States Soccer Federation) Sporting Kansas City |
| 18 | GK | Quillan Roberts | 13 September 1994 (aged 20) | (Canadian Soccer Association) Toronto FC |
| 19 | MF | Pedro Pacheco | 27 June 1984 (aged 31) | (Portuguese Football Federation) Santa Clara |
| 20 | DF | Karl Ouimette | 18 June 1992 (aged 23) | (United States Soccer Federation) New York Red Bulls |
| 21 | FW | Cyle Larin | 17 April 1995 (aged 20) | (United States Soccer Federation) Orlando City SC |
| 22 | GK | Kyriakos Stamatopoulos | 28 August 1979 (aged 35) | (Swedish Football Association) AIK |
| 23 | FW | Tesho Akindele | 31 March 1992 (aged 23) | (United States Soccer Federation) FC Dallas |

=== Costa Rica ===
Head coach: Paulo Wanchope

| No. | Pos. | Player | Date of birth (age) | Club |
|---|---|---|---|---|
| 1 | GK | Danny Carvajal | 8 January 1989 (aged 26) | (Costa Rican Football Federation) Saprissa |
| 2 | DF | Francisco Calvo | 8 July 1992 (aged 22) | (Costa Rican Football Federation) Saprissa |
| 3 | DF | Giancarlo González | 8 February 1988 (aged 27) | (Italian Football Federation) Palermo |
| 4 | DF | Michael Umaña (substituted off) (Note: Umaña was replaced following the group stage.) | 16 July 1982 (aged 32) | (Football Federation Islamic Republic of Iran) Persepolis |
| 5 | MF | Celso Borges | 27 May 1988 (aged 27) | (Royal Spanish Football Federation) Deportivo La Coruña |
| 6 | DF | Keyner Brown | 30 December 1991 (aged 23) | (Costa Rican Football Federation) Herediano |
| 7 | MF | Elías Aguilar | 7 November 1991 (aged 23) | (Costa Rican Football Federation) Herediano |
| 8 | DF | David Myrie | 1 June 1988 (aged 27) | (Costa Rican Football Federation) Herediano |
| 9 | FW | Álvaro Saborío | 25 March 1982 (aged 33) | (United States Soccer Federation) Real Salt Lake |
| 10 | FW | Bryan Ruiz (captain) | 18 August 1985 (aged 29) | (The Football Association) Fulham |
| 11 | FW | Jonathan McDonald | 28 October 1987 (aged 27) | (Costa Rican Football Federation) Alajuelense |
| 12 | FW | Joel Campbell | 26 June 1992 (aged 23) | (The Football Association) Arsenal |
| 13 | MF | Marvin Angulo | 30 September 1986 (aged 28) | (Costa Rican Football Federation) Saprissa |
| 14 | MF | Deyver Vega | 19 September 1992 (aged 22) | (Costa Rican Football Federation) Saprissa |
| 15 | DF | Júnior Díaz | 12 September 1983 (aged 31) | (German Football Association) Mainz 05 |
| 16 | DF | Cristian Gamboa | 24 October 1989 (aged 25) | (The Football Association) West Bromwich Albion |
| 17 | MF | Johan Venegas | 27 November 1988 (aged 26) | (Costa Rican Football Federation) Alajuelense |
| 18 | GK | Patrick Pemberton | 24 April 1982 (aged 33) | (Costa Rican Football Federation) Alajuelense |
| 19 | DF | Roy Miller | 24 November 1984 (aged 30) | (United States Soccer Federation) New York Red Bulls |
| 20 | MF | David Guzmán | 18 February 1990 (aged 25) | (Costa Rican Football Federation) Saprissa |
| 21 | MF | David Ramírez | 28 May 1993 (aged 22) | (Costa Rican Football Federation) Saprissa |
| 22 | MF | José Miguel Cubero | 14 February 1987 (aged 28) | (The Football Association) Blackpool |
| 23 | GK | Esteban Alvarado | 28 April 1989 (aged 26) | (Royal Dutch Football Association) AZ |
| 24 | DF | Kendall Waston (substituted on) (Note: Waston was introduced as an alternate player following the group stage.) | 1 January 1988 (aged 27) | (Canadian Soccer Association) Vancouver Whitecaps FC |

=== El Salvador ===
Head coach: (Spain) Albert Roca

| No. | Pos. | Player | Date of birth (age) | Club |
|---|---|---|---|---|
| 1 | GK | Luis Contreras | 27 October 1982 (aged 32) | (Salvadoran Football Federation) FAS |
| 2 | DF | Xavier Garcia | 26 June 1990 (aged 25) | (Salvadoran Football Federation) FAS |
| 3 | DF | Milton Molina | 2 February 1989 (aged 26) | (Salvadoran Football Federation) Isidro Metapán |
| 4 | DF | Danny Torres | 7 November 1987 (aged 27) | (Salvadoran Football Federation) Alianza |
| 5 | DF | Alexander Méndoza | 4 June 1990 (aged 25) | (Salvadoran Football Federation) FAS |
| 6 | MF | Richard Menjivar | 31 October 1990 (aged 24) | (United States Soccer Federation) Tampa Bay Rowdies |
| 7 | MF | Darwin Cerén | 31 December 1989 (aged 25) | (United States Soccer Federation) Orlando City SC |
| 8 | MF | Jairo Henríquez | 31 August 1993 (aged 21) | (Salvadoran Football Federation) FAS |
| 9 | FW | Rafael Burgos | 3 July 1988 (aged 27) | (Norwegian Football Federation) Fredrikstad |
| 10 | MF | Jaime Alas | 30 July 1989 (aged 25) | (National Football Federation of Guatemala) Municipal |
| 11 | FW | Nelson Bonilla | 11 September 1990 (aged 24) | (Romanian Football Federation) Viitorul |
| 12 | MF | Arturo Alvarez | 28 June 1985 (aged 30) | (Hungarian Football Federation) Videoton |
| 13 | DF | Alexander Larín | 27 June 1992 (aged 23) | (Costa Rican Football Federation) Herediano |
| 14 | MF | Andrés Flores (captain) | 31 August 1990 (aged 24) | (United States Soccer Federation) New York Cosmos |
| 15 | MF | Néstor Renderos | 10 September 1988 (aged 26) | (Salvadoran Football Federation) FAS |
| 16 | MF | Narciso Orellana | 28 January 1995 (aged 20) | (Salvadoran Football Federation) Isidro Metapán |
| 17 | DF | Henry Romero | 17 October 1991 (aged 23) | (Salvadoran Football Federation) Águila |
| 18 | GK | Óscar Arroyo | 28 January 1990 (aged 25) | (Salvadoran Football Federation) Alianza |
| 19 | FW | Irvin Herrera | 30 August 1991 (aged 23) | (Salvadoran Football Federation) Santa Tecla |
| 20 | MF | Pablo Punyed | 18 April 1990 (aged 25) | (Football Association of Iceland) Stjarnan |
| 21 | MF | Dustin Corea | 21 March 1992 (aged 23) | (Salvadoran Football Federation) FAS |
| 22 | GK | Derby Carrillo | 19 September 1987 (aged 27) | (Salvadoran Football Federation) Santa Tecla |
| 23 | MF | William Maldonado | 3 January 1990 (aged 25) | (Salvadoran Football Federation) Santa Tecla |

=== Jamaica ===
Head coach: (Germany) Winfried Schäfer

| No. | Pos. | Player | Date of birth (age) | Club |
|---|---|---|---|---|
| 1 | GK | Andre Blake | 21 November 1990 (aged 24) | (United States Soccer Federation) Philadelphia Union |
| 2 | MF | Chris Humphrey | 19 September 1987 (aged 27) | (The Football Association) Preston North End |
| 3 | DF | Michael Hector | 17 July 1992 (aged 22) | (The Football Association) Reading |
| 4 | DF | Wes Morgan | 21 January 1984 (aged 31) | (The Football Association) Leicester City |
| 5 | DF | Alvas Powell (substituted off) (Note: Powell was replaced following the group stage.) | 18 August 1994 (aged 20) | (United States Soccer Federation) Portland Timbers |
| 6 | DF | Lance Laing | 28 February 1988 (aged 27) | (Canadian Soccer Association) FC Edmonton |
| 7 | FW | Andre Clennon | 15 August 1989 (aged 25) | (Jamaica Football Federation) Arnett Gardens |
| 8 | FW | Michael Seaton | 1 May 1996 (aged 19) | (Swedish Football Association) Örebro SK |
| 9 | FW | Giles Barnes | 5 August 1988 (aged 26) | (United States Soccer Federation) Houston Dynamo |
| 10 | MF | Jobi McAnuff | 9 November 1981 (aged 33) | (The Football Association) Leyton Orient |
| 11 | FW | Darren Mattocks | 2 September 1990 (aged 24) | (Canadian Soccer Association) Vancouver Whitecaps FC |
| 12 | DF | Demar Phillips | 23 September 1983 (aged 31) | (United States Soccer Federation) Real Salt Lake |
| 13 | GK | Dwayne Miller | 14 July 1987 (aged 27) | (Swedish Football Association) Syrianska |
| 14 | FW | Allan Ottey | 18 December 1992 (aged 22) | (Jamaica Football Federation) Montego Bay United |
| 15 | MF | Je-Vaughn Watson | 22 October 1983 (aged 31) | (United States Soccer Federation) FC Dallas |
| 16 | MF | Joel Grant | 26 August 1987 (aged 27) | (The Football Association) Yeovil Town |
| 17 | MF | Rodolph Austin (captain) | 1 June 1985 (aged 30) | (The Football Association) Leeds United |
| 18 | MF | Simon Dawkins | 1 December 1987 (aged 27) | (The Football Association) Derby County |
| 19 | DF | Adrian Mariappa | 3 October 1986 (aged 28) | (The Football Association) Crystal Palace |
| 20 | DF | Kemar Lawrence | 17 September 1992 (aged 22) | (United States Soccer Federation) New York Red Bulls |
| 21 | DF | Jermaine Taylor (substituted off) (Note: Taylor was replaced following the group stage.) | 14 January 1985 (aged 30) | (United States Soccer Federation) Houston Dynamo |
| 22 | MF | Garath McCleary | 15 May 1987 (aged 28) | (The Football Association) Reading |
| 23 | GK | Ryan Thompson | 1 July 1985 (aged 30) | (United States Soccer Federation) Pittsburgh Riverhounds |
| 24 | MF | Omar Holness (substituted on) (Note: Holness was introduced as an alternate player following the group stage.) | 13 March 1994 (aged 21) | (United States Soccer Federation) North Carolina Tar Heels |
| 25 | DF | Sean McFarlane (substituted on) (Note: McFarlane was introduced as an alternate player following the group stage.) | 3 April 1993 (aged 22) | (United States Soccer Federation) FIU Panthers |

== Group C ==
=== Cuba ===
Head coach: Raúl González

| No. | Pos. | Player | Date of birth (age) | Club |
|---|---|---|---|---|
| 1 | GK | Sandy Sánchez | 24 May 1994 (aged 21) | (Football Association of Cuba) Las Tunas |
| 2 | DF | Andy Vaquero | 12 March 1994 (aged 21) | (Football Association of Cuba) La Habana |
| 3 | DF | Yénier Márquez (captain) | 3 January 1979 (aged 36) | (Football Association of Cuba) Villa Clara |
| 4 | DF | Ángel Horta | 17 March 1984 (aged 31) | (Football Association of Cuba) Camagüey |
| 5 | DF | Jorge Luis Clavelo | 8 August 1982 (aged 32) | (Football Association of Cuba) Villa Clara |
| 6 | DF | Yaisnier Napoles | 20 October 1987 (aged 27) | (Football Association of Cuba) Camagüey |
| 7 | MF | Darío Suárez (Note: Suárez defected to the United States in Charlotte.) | 8 August 1992 (aged 22) | (Football Association of Cuba) La Habana |
| 8 | MF | Alberto Gómez | 12 February 1988 (aged 27) | (Football Association of Cuba) Guantánamo |
| 9 | FW | Maikel Reyes | 4 March 1993 (aged 22) | (Football Association of Cuba) Pinar del Río |
| 10 | MF | Ariel Martínez (Note: Martínez defected to the United States in Charlotte.) | 9 May 1986 (aged 29) | (Football Association of Cuba) Sancti Spiritus |
| 11 | FW | Keiler García (Note: García defected to the United States in Chicago.) | 14 January 1990 (aged 25) | (Football Association of Cuba) Camagüey |
| 12 | GK | Arael Argüelles (Note: Argüelles defected to the United States in Chicago.) | 30 April 1987 (aged 28) | (Football Association of Cuba) Cienfuegos |
| 13 | DF | Jorge Corrales | 20 May 1991 (aged 24) | (Football Association of Cuba) Pinar del Río |
| 14 | MF | Arichel Hernández (Note: Hernández could not travel to the United States as he was unable to obtain a visa due to an administration issue.) | 20 September 1993 (aged 21) | (Football Association of Cuba) Villa Clara |
| 15 | DF | Adrián Diz | 4 March 1994 (aged 21) | (Football Association of Cuba) La Habana |
| 16 | DF | Hánier Dranguet | 27 April 1982 (aged 33) | (Football Association of Cuba) Guantánamo |
| 17 | MF | Libán Pérez | 5 August 1990 (aged 24) | (Football Association of Cuba) Camagüey |
| 18 | MF | Daniel Luís | 11 May 1994 (aged 21) | (Football Association of Cuba) La Habana |
| 19 | DF | Yasmany López | 11 October 1987 (aged 27) | (Football Association of Cuba) Ciego de Ávila |
| 20 | FW | Armando Coroneaux | 2 July 1985 (aged 30) | (Football Association of Cuba) Camagüey |
| 21 | GK | Diosvelis Guerra | 21 May 1989 (aged 26) | (Football Association of Cuba) Artemisa |
| 22 | MF | Alain Cervantes | 17 November 1983 (aged 31) | (Football Association of Cuba) Ciego de Ávila |
| 23 | MF | Felix Guerra | 14 January 1989 (aged 26) | (Football Association of Cuba) Granma |

=== Guatemala ===
Head coach: (Argentina) Iván Sopegno

| No. | Pos. | Player | Date of birth (age) | Club |
|---|---|---|---|---|
| 1 | GK | Víctor Ayala | 8 May 1989 (aged 26) | (National Football Federation of Guatemala) Antigua |
| 2 | DF | Rubén Morales | 4 June 1987 (aged 28) | (National Football Federation of Guatemala) Comunicaciones |
| 3 | DF | Elías Vásquez | 18 June 1992 (aged 23) | (United States Soccer Federation) Real Salt Lake |
| 4 | DF | Wilson Lalín | 3 May 1985 (aged 30) | (National Football Federation of Guatemala) Comunicaciones |
| 5 | DF | Moisés Hernández | 5 March 1992 (aged 23) | (United States Soccer Federation) FC Dallas |
| 6 | MF | Carlos Mejía | 13 November 1991 (aged 23) | (National Football Federation of Guatemala) Comunicaciones |
| 7 | FW | Jairo Arreola | 20 September 1985 (aged 29) | (National Football Federation of Guatemala) Comunicaciones |
| 8 | MF | Jean Márquez | 6 March 1985 (aged 30) | (National Football Federation of Guatemala) Comunicaciones |
| 9 | FW | Édgar Chinchilla | 8 May 1987 (aged 28) | (National Football Federation of Guatemala) Antigua |
| 10 | MF | José Manuel Contreras | 19 January 1986 (aged 29) | (National Football Federation of Guatemala) Comunicaciones |
| 11 | MF | Gerardo Arias | 18 November 1985 (aged 29) | (National Football Federation of Guatemala) Petapa |
| 12 | GK | Paulo César Motta | 29 March 1982 (aged 33) | (National Football Federation of Guatemala) Municipal |
| 13 | DF | Carlos Castrillo | 16 May 1985 (aged 30) | (National Football Federation of Guatemala) Comunicaciones |
| 14 | MF | Kendel Herrarte | 6 April 1992 (aged 23) | (National Football Federation of Guatemala) Comunicaciones |
| 15 | DF | Dennis López | 2 January 1986 (aged 29) | (National Football Federation of Guatemala) Municipal |
| 16 | MF | Marco Pappa | 15 November 1987 (aged 27) | (United States Soccer Federation) Seattle Sounders FC |
| 17 | MF | Brandon de León | 30 September 1993 (aged 21) | (National Football Federation of Guatemala) Marquense |
| 18 | DF | Stefano Cincotta | 28 February 1991 (aged 24) | (German Football Association) Chemnitzer FC |
| 19 | MF | Carlos Figueroa | 19 April 1980 (aged 35) | (National Football Federation of Guatemala) Comunicaciones |
| 20 | FW | Carlos Ruiz (captain) | 15 September 1979 (aged 35) | (National Football Federation of Guatemala) Municipal |
| 21 | GK | Ricardo Jérez | 4 February 1986 (aged 29) | (Colombian Football Federation) Alianza Petrolera |
| 22 | FW | Minor López | 1 February 1987 (aged 28) | (Portuguese Football Federation) Atlético Clube de Portugal |
| 23 | MF | Jorge Aparicio | 21 November 1992 (aged 22) | (National Football Federation of Guatemala) Comunicaciones |

=== Mexico ===
Head coach: Miguel Herrera

| No. | Pos. | Player | Date of birth (age) | Club |
|---|---|---|---|---|
| 1 | GK | Moisés Muñoz | 1 February 1980 (aged 35) | (Mexican Football Federation) América |
| 2 | DF | Francisco Rodríguez | 20 October 1981 (aged 33) | (Mexican Football Federation) Cruz Azul |
| 3 | DF | Yasser Corona | 28 July 1987 (aged 27) | (Mexican Football Federation) Querétaro |
| 4 | DF | Miguel Ángel Herrera | 3 April 1989 (aged 26) | (Mexican Football Federation) Pachuca |
| 5 | DF | Diego Reyes | 19 September 1992 (aged 22) | (Portuguese Football Federation) Porto |
| 6 | MF | Héctor Herrera | 19 April 1990 (aged 25) | (Portuguese Football Federation) Porto |
| 7 | DF | Miguel Layún | 25 June 1988 (aged 27) | (The Football Association) Watford |
| 8 | MF | Jonathan dos Santos | 26 April 1990 (aged 25) | (Royal Spanish Football Federation) Villarreal |
| 9 | MF | Jesús Corona | 6 January 1993 (aged 22) | (Royal Dutch Football Association) Twente |
| 10 | FW | Giovani dos Santos | 11 May 1989 (aged 26) | (United States Soccer Federation) LA Galaxy |
| 11 | FW | Carlos Vela | 1 March 1989 (aged 26) | (Royal Spanish Football Federation) Real Sociedad |
| 12 | GK | Jonathan Orozco | 12 May 1986 (aged 29) | (Mexican Football Federation) Monterrey |
| 13 | GK | Guillermo Ochoa | 13 July 1985 (aged 29) | (Royal Spanish Football Federation) Málaga |
| 14 | FW | Javier Orozco | 16 November 1987 (aged 27) | (Mexican Football Federation) Santos Laguna |
| 15 | DF | Oswaldo Alanís | 18 March 1989 (aged 26) | (Mexican Football Federation) Santos Laguna |
| 16 | MF | Antonio Ríos | 24 October 1988 (aged 26) | (Mexican Football Federation) Toluca |
| 17 | DF | Jorge Torres Nilo | 16 January 1988 (aged 27) | (Mexican Football Federation) Tigres UANL |
| 18 | MF | Andrés Guardado (captain) | 28 September 1986 (aged 28) | (Royal Dutch Football Association) PSV Eindhoven |
| 19 | FW | Oribe Peralta | 12 January 1984 (aged 31) | (Mexican Football Federation) América |
| 20 | MF | Jesús Dueñas | 16 March 1989 (aged 26) | (Mexican Football Federation) Tigres UANL |
| 21 | MF | Carlos Esquivel | 10 April 1982 (aged 33) | (Mexican Football Federation) Toluca |
| 22 | DF | Paul Aguilar | 6 March 1986 (aged 29) | (Mexican Football Federation) América |
| 23 | MF | José Juan Vázquez | 14 March 1988 (aged 27) | (Mexican Football Federation) León |

=== Trinidad and Tobago ===
Head coach: Stephen Hart

| No. | Pos. | Player | Date of birth (age) | Club |
|---|---|---|---|---|
| 1 | GK | Marvin Phillip | 1 August 1984 (aged 30) | (Trinidad and Tobago Football Association) Point Fortin Civic |
| 2 | DF | Aubrey David | 10 November 1990 (aged 24) | (Kazakhstan Football Federation) Shakhter |
| 3 | MF | Joevin Jones | 8 March 1991 (aged 24) | (United States Soccer Federation) Chicago Fire |
| 4 | DF | Sheldon Bateau | 29 January 1991 (aged 24) | (Royal Belgian Football Association) Mechelen |
| 5 | DF | Daneil Cyrus | 15 December 1990 (aged 24) | (Vietnam Football Federation) Hanoi T&T |
| 6 | DF | Radanfah Abu Bakr | 12 February 1987 (aged 28) | (Danish Football Association) HB Køge |
| 7 | FW | Jonathan Glenn | 27 August 1987 (aged 27) | (Football Association of Iceland) ÍBV |
| 8 | DF | Khaleem Hyland | 5 June 1989 (aged 26) | (Royal Belgian Football Association) Genk |
| 9 | FW | Kenwyne Jones (captain) | 5 October 1984 (aged 30) | (Football Association of Wales) Cardiff City |
| 10 | FW | Willis Plaza | 8 October 1987 (aged 27) | (Trinidad and Tobago Football Association) Central FC |
| 11 | FW | Ataullah Guerra | 3 August 1987 (aged 27) | (Trinidad and Tobago Football Association) Central FC |
| 12 | FW | Kadeem Corbin | 4 March 1996 (aged 19) | (Trinidad and Tobago Football Association) St. Ann's Rangers F.C. |
| 13 | MF | Cordell Cato | 25 July 1992 (aged 22) | (United States Soccer Federation) San Jose Earthquakes |
| 14 | MF | Andre Boucaud | 10 October 1984 (aged 30) | (The Football Association) Dagenham & Redbridge |
| 15 | MF | Dwane James | 4 December 1988 (aged 26) | (Trinidad and Tobago Football Association) North East Stars |
| 16 | FW | Rundell Winchester | 16 December 1993 (aged 21) | (United States Soccer Federation) Portland Timbers 2 |
| 17 | DF | Mekeil Williams | 24 July 1990 (aged 24) | (Trinidad and Tobago Football Association) W Connection |
| 18 | DF | Yohance Marshall | 22 January 1986 (aged 29) | (Salvadoran Football Federation) Juventud Independiente |
| 19 | DF | Kevan George | 30 January 1990 (aged 25) | (United States Soccer Federation) Columbus Crew SC |
| 20 | MF | Keron Cummings | 28 May 1988 (aged 27) | (Trinidad and Tobago Football Association) North East Stars |
| 21 | GK | Jan-Michael Williams | 26 October 1984 (aged 30) | (Trinidad and Tobago Football Association) Central FC |
| 22 | GK | Adrian Foncette | 10 October 1988 (aged 26) | (Trinidad and Tobago Football Association) Police FC |
| 23 | MF | Lester Peltier | 13 September 1988 (aged 26) | (Slovak Football Association) Slovan Bratislava |

== Player representation ==
=== By club ===
| Players | Clubs |
|---|---|
| 11 | (Guatemala) Comunicaciones |
| 7 | (Costa Rica) Saprissa |
| 6 | (El Salvador) FAS |
| 5 | (Canada) Toronto FC (Costa Rica) Herediano (Cuba) Camagüey (United States) FC Dallas (United States) Houston Dynamo (United States) Real Salt Lake |
| 4 | (Costa Rica) Alajuelense (Cuba) La Habana (Guatemala) Municipal (Honduras) Motagua (Honduras) Olimpia (Mexico) América (United States) LA Galaxy (United States) New York Red Bulls |
| 3 | (Canada) Vancouver Whitecaps FC (Cuba) Villa Clara (El Salvador) Santa Tecla (Honduras) Real España (Trinidad and Tobago) Central (United States) Seattle Sounders FC |
| 2 | (Cuba) Ciego de Ávila (Cuba) Guantánamo (Cuba) Pinar del Río (El Salvador) Alianza (El Salvador) Isidro Metapán (England) Reading (Guatemala) Antigua GFC (Mexico) León (Mexico) Santos Laguna (Mexico) Tigres UANL (Mexico) Tijuana (Mexico) Toluca (Netherlands) AZ (Norway) Fredrikstad (Panama) Árabe Unido (Panama) Chorrillo (Panama) San Miguelito (Portugal) Porto (Spain) Deportivo La Coruña (Spain) Villarreal (Trinidad and Tobago) North East Stars (United States) Orlando City SC (United States) San Jose Earthquakes (United States) Sporting Kansas City |
| 1 | (Argentina) Gimnasia y Esgrima (Belgium) Anderlecht (Belgium) Genk (Belgium) Mechelen (Belgium) Standard Liège (Canada) FC Edmonton (Canada) Montreal Impact (Canada) Ottawa Fury FC (China) Qingdao Jonoon (Colombia) Alianza Petrolera (Colombia) Millonarios (Colombia) Santa Fe (Cuba) Artemisa (Cuba) Cienfuegos (Cuba) Granma (Cuba) Las Tunas (Cuba) Sancti Spíritus (Cyprus) Ethnikos Achna (Cyprus) NEA (Denmark) HB Køge (El Salvador) Águila (El Salvador) Juventud Independiente (England) Arsenal (England) Aston Villa (England) Birmingham City (England) Blackpool (England) Bolton Wanderers (England) Coventry City (England) Crewe Alexandra (England) Crystal Palace (England) Dagenham & Redbridge (England) Derby County (England) Fulham (England) Leeds United (England) Leicester City (England) Leyton Orient (England) Preston North End (England) Tottenham Hotspur (England) Watford (England) West Bromwich Albion (England) Yeovil Town (France) Angers (France) Laval (France) Nantes (France) Reims (Germany) VfR Aalen (Germany) Borussia Mönchengladbach (Germany) Chemnitzer FC (Germany) Eintracht Frankfurt (Germany) Energie Cottbus (Germany) Hertha BSC (Germany) FC Ingolstadt (Germany) Mainz 05 (Germany) FC St. Pauli (Greece) Aiginiakos (Greece) Panthrakikos (Guatemala) Coatepeque (Guatemala) Marquense (Guatemala) Petapa (Haiti) América des Cayes (Haiti) Don Bosco (Honduras) Marathón (Honduras) Victoria (Honduras) Vida (Hungary) Budapest Honvéd (Hungary) Videoton (Iceland) ÍBV (Iceland) Stjarnan (India) Mohun Bagan (Iran) Persepolis (Israel) Hapoel Haifa (Italy) Palermo (Jamaica) Arnett Gardens (Jamaica) Montego Bay United (Japan) Shimizu S-Pulse (Kazakhstan) Shakhter (Malaysia) Negeri Sembilan (Mexico) BUAP (Mexico) Cruz Azul (Mexico) Monterrey (Mexico) Pachuca (Mexico) Querétaro (Mexico) Sinaloa (Mexico) UAT (Netherlands) PSV Eindhoven (Norway) Vålerenga (Panama) Plaza Amador (Peru) Juan Aurich (Poland) Lech Poznań (Poland) Miedź Legnica (Poland) Wisła Kraków (Portugal) Atlético CP (Portugal) Boavista (Portugal) Santa Clara (Romania) Steaua București (Romania) Viitorul (Russia) Rostov (Slovakia) Slovan Bratislava (Spain) Málaga (Spain) Real Sociedad (Sweden) AIK (Sweden) Örebro SK (Sweden) Syrianska (Switzerland) Aarau (Trinidad and Tobago) Point Fortin Civic (Trinidad and Tobago) Police (Trinidad and Tobago) St. Ann's Rangers (Trinidad and Tobago) W Connection (United States) Atlanta Silverbacks (United States) Charleston Battery (United States) Charlotte Independence (United States) Chicago Fire (United States) Colorado Rapids (United States) Columbus Crew SC (United States) FIU Panthers (United States) Fort Lauderdale Strikers (United States) Jacksonville Armada (United States) Kraze United (United States) New York City FC (United States) New York Cosmos (United States) North Carolina Tar Heels (United States) Philadelphia Union (United States) Pittsburgh Riverhounds (United States) Portland Timbers (United States) Portland Timbers 2 (United States) Tampa Bay Rowdies (Uruguay) Fénix (Vietnam) Hà Nội T&T (Wales) Cardiff City |

=== By club nationality ===
Nations in bold are represented by their national teams in the tournament.

| Players | Clubs |
|---|---|
| 50 | **United States** |
| 23 | **Cuba** |
| 21 | England; **Mexico** |
| 20 | **Guatemala** |
| 16 | **Costa Rica** |
| 15 | **El Salvador** |
| 14 | **Honduras** |
| 11 | **Canada** |
| 9 | Germany; **Trinidad and Tobago** |
| 7 | **Panama** |
| 6 | Spain |
| 5 | Portugal |
| 4 | Belgium; France; Netherlands |
| 3 | Colombia; Norway; Poland; Sweden |
| 2 | Cyprus; Greece; **Haiti**; Hungary; Iceland; **Jamaica**; Romania |
| 1 | Argentina; China; Denmark; India; Iran; Israel; Italy; Japan; Kazakhstan; Malaysia; Peru; Russia; Slovakia; Switzerland; Uruguay; Vietnam; Wales |

The above table is the same when it comes to league representation, with only the following exceptions:

- The American league had 61 representatives with the inclusion of players coming from Canada-based FC Edmonton, Montreal Impact, Ottawa Fury FC, Toronto FC and Vancouver Whitecaps FC.
- The English league had 22 representatives with the inclusion of one player coming from Wales-based Cardiff City.
