= 2015 CONCACAF Gold Cup Group C =

Group C of the 2015 CONCACAF Gold Cup was one of three groups competing of nations at the 2015 CONCACAF Gold Cup. The group's matches were played in July. All six group matches were played at venues in the United States. Matches were played at Chicago's Soldier Field on July 9, Glendale's University of Phoenix Stadium on July 12 and Charlotte's Bank of America Stadium on July 15.

== Teams ==
Draw position	Team	Zone	Method of qualification	Date of qualification	Finals appearance	Last appearance	Previous best performance	FIFA Rankings	
Draw position	Team	Zone	Method of qualification	Date of qualification	Finals appearance	Last appearance	Previous best performance	November 2014 (Note: The rankings of November 2014 were used for seeding for the draw.)	Start of event
C1	Mexico	NAFU	Automatic	N/A	13th	2013	Winners (1993, 1996, 1998, 2003, 2009, 2011)	20	23
C2	Guatemala	UNCAF	2014 Copa Centroamericana runners-up	September 10, 2014	10th	2011	Fourth place (1996)	73	93
C3	Trinidad and Tobago	CFU	2014 Caribbean Cup runners-up	November 13, 2014	9th	2013	Semi-finals (2000)	54	67
C4	Cuba	CFU	2014 Caribbean Cup fourth place	November 13, 2014	8th	2013	Quarter-finals (2003, 2013)	79	107

== Standings ==
Pos	Team	Pld	W	D	L	GF	GA	GD	Pts	Qualification
1	Trinidad and Tobago	3	2	1	0	9	5	+4	7	Advance to knockout stage
2	Mexico	3	1	2	0	10	4	+6	5	Advance to knockout stage
3	Cuba	3	1	0	2	1	8	−7	3	Advance to knockout stage
4	Guatemala	3	0	1	2	1	4	−3	1	

Source: CONCACAF

In the quarter-finals:

- Trinidad and Tobago advanced to play Panama (third-placed team of Group A).
- Mexico advanced to play Costa Rica (runner-up of Group B).
- Cuba (as one of the two best third-placed teams) advanced to play United States (winner of Group A).

== Matches ==
All times EDT (UTC−4). If the venue is located in a different time zone, the local time is given in parentheses.

=== Trinidad and Tobago vs Guatemala ===
July 9, 2015
19:00 (18:00 CDT)

Trinidad and Tobago	3–1	Guatemala
Bateau 11'; Cato 14'; J. Jones 25'	Report	Ruiz 62'

Soldier Field, Chicago
Attendance: 54,126
Referee: John Pitti (Panama)

Trinidad and Tobago	Guatemala

GK	21	Jan-Michael Williams
RB	5	Daneil Cyrus	(yellow card) 35'
CB	6	Radanfah Abu Bakr	(yellow card) 51'
CB	4	Sheldon Bateau
LB	3	Joevin Jones		(substituted off) 80'
RM	2	Aubrey David
CM	8	Khaleem Hyland	(yellow card) 67'	(substituted off) 77'
CM	13	Cordell Cato
LM	19	Kevan George
CF	11	Ataullah Guerra		(substituted off) 63'
CF	9	Kenwyne Jones (c)
Substitutions:
FW	10	Willis Plaza		(substituted on) 63'
MF	14	Andre Boucaud	(yellow card) 80'	(substituted on) 77'
MF	23	Lester Peltier		(substituted on) 80'
Manager:
Stephen Hart

GK	21	Ricardo Jérez
CB	4	Wilson Lalín	(yellow card) 74'
CB	3	Elías Vásquez
CB	5	Moisés Hernández
RWB	14	Kendel Herrarte		(substituted off) 70'
CM	23	Jorge Aparicio
CM	8	Jean Márquez		(substituted off) 46'
LWB	18	Stefano Cincotta		(substituted off) 46'
AM	20	Carlos Ruiz (c)	(yellow card) 73'
CF	10	José Manuel Contreras
CF	16	Marco Pappa
Substitutions:
MF	6	Carlos Mejía		(substituted on) 46'
FW	22	Minor López		(substituted on) 46'
FW	9	Édgar Chinchilla		(substituted on) 70'
Manager:
(Argentina) Iván Sopegno

Assistant referees:
Eric Boria (United States)
Philippe Brière (Canada)
Fourth official:
Mark Geiger (United States)

=== Mexico vs Cuba ===
July 9, 2015
21:30 (20:30 CDT)

Mexico	6–0	Cuba
Peralta 17', 37', 62'; Vela 23'; Guardado 44'; G. dos Santos 75'	Report

Soldier Field, Chicago
Attendance: 54,126
Referee: Wálter Quesada (Costa Rica)

Mexico	Cuba

GK	13	Guillermo Ochoa
RB	22	Paul Aguilar
CB	2	Francisco Rodríguez
CB	5	Diego Reyes
LB	7	Miguel Layún
CM	16	Antonio Ríos
CM	8	Jonathan dos Santos	(substituted off) 56'
RW	6	Héctor Herrera
LW	18	Andrés Guardado (c)	(substituted off) 71'
CF	11	Carlos Vela	(substituted off) 71'
CF	19	Oribe Peralta
Substitutions:
FW	10	Giovani dos Santos	(substituted on) 56'
MF	9	Jesús Corona	(substituted on) 71'
MF	21	Carlos Esquivel	(substituted on) 71'
Manager:
Miguel Herrera

GK	21	Diosvelis Guerra
CB	3	Yénier Márquez (c)
CB	13	Jorge Corrales	(substituted off) 79'
RWB	6	Yaisnier Napoles
CM	23	Felix Guerra	(substituted off) 66'
CM	10	Ariel Martínez
LWB	8	Alberto Gómez
RW	5	Jorge Luis Clavelo
AM	19	Yasmany López
LW	16	Hánier Dranguet
CF	20	Armando Coroneaux	(substituted off) 54'
Substitutions: (Note: Cuba were only able to name five of a possible twelve substitutes on the bench. Six players named in the Cuba squad were not present in the country due to U.S. visa problems: Adrián Diz, Arichel Hernandez, Daniel Luis, Andy Vaquero, Maikel Reyes and Sandy Sánchez. Forward Keiler García had defected to the United States whilst in Chicago prior to the match.)
MF	7	Darío Suárez	(substituted on) 54'
DF	4	Ángel Horta	(substituted on) 66'
MF	17	Libán Pérez	(substituted on) 79'
Manager:
Walter Benítez (Note: Head coach Raúl González was not present in the United States due to a visa problem. Assistant coach Walter Benítez took control of the national team for the game.)

Assistant referees:
Octavio Jara (Costa Rica)
Juan Zumba (El Salvador)
Fourth official:
Armando Castro (Honduras)

=== Trinidad and Tobago vs Cuba ===
July 12, 2015
18:30 (16:30 MST)

Trinidad and Tobago	2–0	Cuba
Bateau 17'; Boucaud 42'	Report

University of Phoenix Stadium, Glendale
Attendance: 62,910
Referee: David Gantar (Canada)

Trinidad and Tobago	Cuba

GK	21	Jan-Michael Williams		(substituted off) 45'
RB	6	Radanfah Abu Bakr
CB	2	Aubrey David
CB	4	Sheldon Bateau
LB	17	Mekeil Williams
CM	23	Lester Peltier		(substituted off) 80'
CM	19	Kevan George
RW	14	Andre Boucaud	(yellow card) 28'
LW	3	Joevin Jones
CF	11	Ataullah Guerra		(substituted off) 67'
CF	9	Kenwyne Jones (c)	(yellow card) 51'
Substitutions:
GK	1	Marvin Phillip		(substituted on) 45'
MF	20	Keron Cummings		(substituted on) 67'
MF	13	Cordell Cato		(substituted on) 80'
Manager:
Stephen Hart

GK	21	Diosvelis Guerra
RB	6	Yaisnier Napoles
CB	2	Andy Vaquero
CB	5	Jorge Luis Clavelo
LB	15	Adrián Diz	(yellow card) 15'
DM	8	Alberto Gómez		(substituted off) 68'
RM	18	Daniel Luis		(substituted off) 79'
LM	22	Alain Cervantes		(substituted off) 61'
AM	3	Yénier Márquez (c)
CF	10	Ariel Martínez	(yellow card) 65'
CF	9	Maikel Reyes
Substitutions:
MF	7	Darío Suárez		(substituted on) 61'
MF	17	Libán Pérez		(substituted on) 68'
DF	16	Hánier Dranguet		(substituted on) 79'
Manager:
Raúl González

Assistant referees:
Philippe Brière (Canada)
Daniel Belleau (Canada)
Fourth official:
Elmer Bonilla (El Salvador)

=== Guatemala vs Mexico ===
July 12, 2015
21:00 (19:00 MST)

Guatemala	0–0	Mexico
	Report

University of Phoenix Stadium, Glendale
Attendance: 62,910
Referee: Armando Castro (Honduras)

Guatemala	Mexico

GK	12	Paulo César Motta
RB	15	Dennis López
CB	4	Wilson Lalín
CB	3	Elías Vásquez
LB	2	Rubén Morales	(yellow card) 11'
DM	5	Moisés Hernández	(yellow card) 77'	(substituted off) 82'
DM	17	Brandon de León
AM	23	Jorge Aparicio	(yellow card) 37'
AM	10	José Manuel Contreras	(yellow card) 73' (yellow-red card) 76'
CF	20	Carlos Ruiz (c)		(substituted off) 77'
CF	22	Minor López		(substituted off) 87'
Substitutions:
MF	16	Marco Pappa		(substituted on) 77'
DF	18	Stefano Cincotta		(substituted on) 82'
FW	9	Édgar Chinchilla		(substituted on) 87'
Manager:
(Argentina) Iván Sopegno

GK	13	Guillermo Ochoa
RB	22	Paul Aguilar	(yellow card) 45'	(substituted off) 82'
CB	2	Francisco Rodríguez
CB	5	Diego Reyes
LB	7	Miguel Layún	(yellow card) 50'
DM	23	José Juan Vázquez		(substituted off) 66'
RM	6	Héctor Herrera
LM	18	Andrés Guardado (c)
AM	8	Jonathan dos Santos		(substituted off) 86'
CF	19	Oribe Peralta
CF	11	Carlos Vela
Substitutions:
MF	21	Carlos Esquivel		(substituted on) 66'
FW	10	Giovani dos Santos		(substituted on) 82'
FW	14	Javier Orozco		(substituted on) 86'
Manager:
Miguel Herrera

Assistant referees:
Octavio Jara (Costa Rica)
Juan Zumba (El Salvador)
Fourth official:
Wálter Quesada (Costa Rica)

=== Cuba vs Guatemala ===
July 15, 2015
18:00

Cuba	1–0	Guatemala
Reyes 73'	Report

Bank of America Stadium, Charlotte
Attendance: 55,823
Referee: Elmer Bonilla (El Salvador)

Cuba	Guatemala

GK	21	Diosvelis Guerra
CB	15	Adrián Diz
CB	13	Jorge Corrales	(yellow card) 17'	(substituted off) 60'
CB	3	Yénier Márquez (c)
RWB	2	Andy Vaquero
LWB	6	Yaisnier Napoles	(yellow card) 14'
RM	18	Daniel Luis		(substituted off) 67'
CM	5	Jorge Luis Clavelo
LM	8	Alberto Gómez	(yellow card) 85'	(substituted off) 85'
CF	10	Ariel Martínez
CF	9	Maikel Reyes	(yellow card) 74'
Substitutions:
MF	22	Alain Cervantes		(substituted on) 60'
DF	16	Hánier Dranguet		(substituted on) 67'
MF	17	Libán Pérez		(substituted on) 85'
Manager:
Raúl González

GK	12	Paulo César Motta
RB	15	Dennis López
CB	4	Wilson Lalín		(substituted off) 46'
CB	3	Elías Vásquez	(yellow card) 45'
LB	2	Rubén Morales	(yellow card) 62'
CM	6	Carlos Mejía
CM	23	Jorge Aparicio
RW	17	Brandon de León		(substituted off) 60'
LW	16	Marco Pappa
CF	22	Minor López		(substituted off) 68'
CF	20	Carlos Ruiz (c)
Substitutions:
MF	19	Carlos Figueroa		(substituted on) 46'
DF	18	Stefano Cincotta		(substituted on) 60'
FW	9	Édgar Chinchilla		(substituted on) 68'
Manager:
(Argentina) Iván Sopegno

Assistant referees:
Daniel Belleau (Canada)
Philippe Brière (Canada)
Fourth official:
David Gantar (Canada)

=== Mexico vs Trinidad and Tobago ===
July 15, 2015
20:30

Mexico	4–4	Trinidad and Tobago
Aguilar 32'; Vela 51'; Guardado 88'; K. Jones 90+1' (o.g.)	Report	Cummings 55', 67'; K. Jones 58'; Marshall 90+3'

Bank of America Stadium, Charlotte
Attendance: 55,823
Referee: Mark Geiger (United States)

Mexico	Trinidad and Tobago

GK	13	Guillermo Ochoa
CB	5	Diego Reyes
CB	2	Francisco Rodríguez
CB	3	Yasser Corona		(substituted off) 78'
RWB	22	Paul Aguilar
LWB	7	Miguel Layún
RM	6	Héctor Herrera	(yellow card) 66'
CM	8	Jonathan dos Santos		(substituted off) 66'
LM	18	Andrés Guardado (c)
CF	10	Giovani dos Santos		(substituted off) 46'
CF	11	Carlos Vela
Substitutions:
FW	19	Oribe Peralta		(substituted on) 46'
MF	9	Jesús Corona		(substituted on) 66'
MF	21	Carlos Esquivel		(substituted on) 78'
Manager:
Miguel Herrera

GK	1	Marvin Phillip
RB	2	Aubrey David
CB	4	Sheldon Bateau
CB	18	Yohance Marshall
LB	17	Mekeil Williams	(yellow card) 76'
RM	3	Joevin Jones
CM	13	Cordell Cato
LM	19	Kevan George
RF	8	Khaleem Hyland		(substituted off) 78'
CF	20	Keron Cummings	(yellow card) 60'	(substituted off) 89'
LF	9	Kenwyne Jones (c)
Substitutions:
MF	15	Dwane James	(substituted on) 78'
FW	10	Willis Plaza	(substituted on) 89'
Manager:
Stephen Hart

Assistant referees:
Eric Boria (United States)
Peter Manikowski (United States)
Fourth official:
John Pitti (Panama)
