= 2015 CONCACAF Gold Cup knockout stage =

The knockout stage of the 2015 CONCACAF Gold Cup began on July 18 and ended with the final on July 26, 2015, to decide the champions of the 2015 CONCACAF Gold Cup. A total of eight teams competed in the knockout stage.

== Qualified teams ==
The top two placed teams from each of the three groups, plus the two best-placed third teams, qualified for the knockout stage.

Group	Winners	Runners-up	Third-placed teams (Best two qualified)
A	United States	Haiti	Panama
B	Jamaica	Costa Rica	—N/a
C	Trinidad and Tobago	Mexico	Cuba

== Bracket ==
The tournament bracket is shown below, with bold denoting the winners of each match.

Quarter-finals
July 18 – Baltimore
**United States**	**6**
Cuba	0
July 18 – Baltimore
Haiti	0
**Jamaica**	**1**
July 19 – East Rutherford
Trinidad and Tobago	1 (5)
**Panama (p)**	**1 (6)**
July 19 – East Rutherford
**Mexico (a.e.t.)**	**1**
Costa Rica	0

Semi-finals
July 22 – Atlanta
United States	1
**Jamaica**	**2**
July 22 – Atlanta
Panama	1
**Mexico (a.e.t.)**	**2**

Final
July 26 – Philadelphia
Jamaica	1
**Mexico**	**3**
Third place play-off
July 25 – Chester
United States	1 (2)
**Panama (p)**	**1 (3)**

== Quarter-finals ==
=== United States vs Cuba ===
July 18, 2015
17:00

United States	6–0	Cuba
Dempsey 4', 64' (pen.), 78'; Zardes 15'; Jóhannsson 32'; Gonzalez 45'	Report

M&T Bank Stadium, Baltimore
Attendance: 37,994
Referee: Henry Bejarano (Costa Rica)

**United States**	**Cuba**

GK	1	Brad Guzan
RB	21	Timothy Chandler	(substituted off) 46'
CB	3	Omar Gonzalez
CB	13	Ventura Alvarado
LB	23	Fabian Johnson	(substituted off) 65'
DM	5	Kyle Beckerman	(substituted off) 46'
CM	4	Michael Bradley (c)
CM	11	Alejandro Bedoya
RF	20	Gyasi Zardes
CF	8	Clint Dempsey
LF	9	Aron Jóhannsson
Substitutions:
DF	16	Brad Evans	(substituted on) 46'
MF	24	Joe Corona	(substituted on) 46'
MF	2	DeAndre Yedlin	(substituted on) 65'
Manager:
(Germany) Jürgen Klinsmann

GK	21	Diosvelis Guerra
RB	6	Yaisnier Napoles	(yellow card) 59'
CB	4	Ángel Horta	(yellow card) 63'
CB	15	Adrián Diz
LB	2	Andy Vaquero
CM	5	Jorge Luis Clavelo (c)
CM	18	Daniel Luís		(substituted off) 68'
RW	13	Jorge Corrales
AM	8	Alberto Gómez		(substituted off) 74'
LW	17	Libán Pérez		(substituted off) 56'
CF	9	Maikel Reyes
Substitutions:
FW	20	Armando Coroneaux		(substituted on) 56'
DF	19	Yasmany López		(substituted on) 68'
MF	23	Felix Guerra		(substituted on) 74'
Manager:
Raúl González

Assistant referees:
Warner Castro (Costa Rica)
Leonel Leal (Costa Rica)
Fourth official:
Joel Aguilar (El Salvador)

=== Haiti vs Jamaica ===
July 18, 2015
20:00

Haiti	0–1	Jamaica
	Report	Barnes 7'

M&T Bank Stadium, Baltimore
Attendance: 37,994
Referee: César Ramos (Mexico)

**Haiti**	**Jamaica**

GK	1	Johny Placide (c)
RB	2	Jean Sony Alcénat
CB	6	Frantz Bertin
CB	3	Mechack Jérôme
LB	4	Kim Jaggy
RM	14	James Marcelin
CM	13	Kevin Lafrance
LM	7	Wilde-Donald Guerrier	(substituted off) 69'
AM	16	Jean Alexandre	(substituted off) 83'
CF	21	Jean-Eudes Maurice
CF	20	Duckens Nazon	(substituted off) 70'
Substitutions:
MF	11	Pascal Millien	(substituted on) 69'
FW	9	Kervens Belfort	(substituted on) 70'
MF	22	Sony Norde	(substituted on) 83'
Manager:
(France) Marc Collat

GK	23	Ryan Thompson
RB	19	Adrian Mariappa	(yellow card) 17'
CB	4	Wes Morgan
CB	3	Michael Hector
LB	20	Kemar Lawrence
CM	17	Rodolph Austin (c)
CM	10	Jobi McAnuff
RW	22	Garath McCleary
LW	16	Joel Grant		(substituted off) 52'
CF	18	Simon Dawkins		(substituted off) 86'
CF	9	Giles Barnes		(substituted off) 90'
Substitutions:
DF	6	Lance Laing		(substituted on) 52'
MF	2	Chris Humphrey		(substituted on) 86'
FW	7	Andre Clennon		(substituted on) 90'
Manager:
(Germany) Winfried Schäfer

Assistant referees:
Alberto Morín (Mexico)
Octavio Jara (Costa Rica)
Fourth official:
John Pitti (Panama)

=== Trinidad and Tobago vs Panama ===
July 19, 2015
16:30

Trinidad and Tobago	1–1 (a.e.t.)	Panama
K. Jones 54'	Report	Tejada 37'
Penalties
Guerra (penalty scored); Bateau (penalty missed); J. Jones (penalty missed); Williams (penalty scored); K. Jones (penalty scored); Abu Bakr (penalty scored); Cyrus (penalty missed); Boucaud (penalty scored); Peltier (penalty missed)	5–6	(penalty missed) R. Torres; (penalty scored) G. Torres; (penalty missed) Davis; (penalty scored) Arroyo; (penalty scored) Cooper; (penalty scored) Cummings; (penalty missed) Quintero; (penalty scored) Pérez; (penalty scored) Pimentel

MetLife Stadium, East Rutherford
Attendance: 74,187
Referee: Héctor Rodríguez (Honduras)

**Trinidad and Tobago**	**Panama**

GK	1	Marvin Phillip
CB	5	Daneil Cyrus
CB	6	Radanfah Abu Bakr
CB	8	Khaleem Hyland		(substituted off) 91'
RWB	4	Sheldon Bateau
LWB	17	Mekeil Williams
RM	3	Joevin Jones
CM	13	Cordell Cato		(substituted off) 65'
CM	19	Kevan George	(yellow card) 74'
LM	20	Keron Cummings		(substituted off) 81'
CF	9	Kenwyne Jones (c)
Substitutions:
MF	23	Lester Peltier		(substituted on) 65'
MF	14	Andre Boucaud		(substituted on) 81'
FW	11	Ataullah Guerra	(yellow card) 100'	(substituted on) 91'
Manager:
Stephen Hart

GK	1	Jaime Penedo
CB	3	Harold Cummings
CB	5	Román Torres (c)
CB	15	Erick Davis
RWB	2	Valentín Pimentel	(yellow card) 7'
LWB	19	Alberto Quintero
CM	6	Gabriel Gomez		(substituted off) 46'
CM	11	Armando Cooper
CM	14	Miguel Camargo		(substituted off) 90'
CF	7	Blas Pérez
CF	10	Luis Tejada		(substituted off) 81'
Substitutions:
DF	13	Adolfo Machado		(substituted on) 46'
FW	8	Gabriel Torres		(substituted on) 81'
FW	22	Abdiel Arroyo		(substituted on) 90'
Manager:
(Colombia) Hernán Darío Gómez

Assistant referees:
Hermenerito Leal (Guatemala)
Juan Zumba (El Salvador)
Fourth official:
Óscar Moncada (Honduras)

=== Mexico vs Costa Rica ===
July 19, 2015
19:30

Mexico	1–0 (a.e.t.)	Costa Rica
Guardado 120+4' (pen.)	Report

MetLife Stadium, East Rutherford
Attendance: 74,187
Referee: Walter López (Guatemala)

**Mexico**	**Costa Rica**

GK	13	Guillermo Ochoa
CB	5	Diego Reyes
CB	2	Francisco Rodríguez	(yellow card) 99'
CB	3	Yasser Corona	(yellow card) 35'	(substituted off) 90'
RWB	22	Paul Aguilar
LWB	7	Miguel Layún
RM	6	Héctor Herrera		(substituted off) 60'
CM	8	Jonathan dos Santos	(yellow card) 110'
LM	18	Andrés Guardado (c)
CF	11	Carlos Vela	(yellow card) 83'	(substituted off) 85'
CF	19	Oribe Peralta	(yellow card) 112'
Substitutions:
MF	21	Carlos Esquivel		(substituted on) 60'
MF	9	Jesús Corona		(substituted on) 85'
DF	15	Oswaldo Alanís		(substituted on) 90'
Manager:
Miguel Herrera

GK	23	Esteban Alvarado
RB	16	Cristian Gamboa		(substituted off) 96'
CB	3	Giancarlo González	(yellow card) 82'
CB	2	Francisco Calvo
LB	15	Júnior Díaz	(yellow card) 9'
CM	5	Celso Borges
CM	17	Johan Venegas	(yellow card) 120+6'
RW	22	José Miguel Cubero	(yellow card) 118'
AM	10	Bryan Ruiz (c)		(substituted off) 78'
LW	21	David Ramírez		(substituted off) 60'
CF	12	Joel Campbell	(yellow card) 12'
Substitutions:
MF	7	Elías Aguilar		(substituted on) 60'
DF	19	Roy Miller	(yellow card) 120+3'	(substituted on) 78'
DF	8	David Myrie	(yellow card) 98'	(substituted on) 96'
Manager:
Paulo Wanchope

Assistant referees:
Eric Boria (United States)
Charles Morgante (United States)
Fourth official:
David Gantar (Canada)

== Semi-finals ==
=== United States vs Jamaica ===
July 22, 2015
18:00

United States	1–2	Jamaica
Bradley 48'	Report	Mattocks 31'; Barnes 36'

Georgia Dome, Atlanta
Attendance: 70,511
Referee: Ricardo Montero (Costa Rica)

**United States**	**Jamaica**

GK	1	Brad Guzan
RB	16	Brad Evans
CB	13	Ventura Alvarado
CB	6	John Brooks
LB	23	Fabian Johnson
DM	5	Kyle Beckerman	(yellow card) 32'	(substituted off) 66'
CM	4	Michael Bradley (c)
CM	11	Alejandro Bedoya		(substituted off) 77'
RF	20	Gyasi Zardes
CF	8	Clint Dempsey
LF	9	Aron Jóhannsson		(substituted off) 73'
Substitutions:
MF	10	Mix Diskerud		(substituted on) 66'
FW	26	Alan Gordon		(substituted on) 73'
MF	2	DeAndre Yedlin	(yellow card) 88'	(substituted on) 77'
Manager:
(Germany) Jürgen Klinsmann

GK	23	Ryan Thompson
RB	19	Adrian Mariappa
CB	3	Michael Hector
CB	4	Wes Morgan
LB	20	Kemar Lawrence
CM	15	Je-Vaughn Watson
CM	17	Rodolph Austin (c)
RW	22	Garath McCleary	(yellow card) 45'	(substituted off) 90+2'
LW	10	Jobi McAnuff
CF	11	Darren Mattocks		(substituted off) 56'
CF	9	Giles Barnes		(substituted off) 84'
Substitutions:
MF	18	Simon Dawkins		(substituted on) 56'
MF	2	Chris Humphrey		(substituted on) 84'
MF	16	Joel Grant		(substituted on) 90+2'
Manager:
(Germany) Winfried Schäfer

Assistant referees:
Octavio Jara (Costa Rica)
Warner Castro (Costa Rica)
Fourth official:
Henry Bejarano (Costa Rica)

=== Panama vs Mexico ===
July 22, 2015
21:00

Panama	1–2 (a.e.t.)	Mexico
R. Torres 57'	Report	Guardado 90+10' (pen.), 105+1' (pen.)

Georgia Dome, Atlanta
Attendance: 70,511
Referee: Mark Geiger (United States)

**Panama**	**Mexico**

GK	1	Jaime Penedo
RB	2	Valentín Pimentel	(yellow card) 83'	(substituted off) 87'
CB	5	Román Torres (c)	(yellow card) 105'
CB	3	Harold Cummings	(yellow card) 108'
LB	15	Erick Davis
CM	13	Adolfo Machado
CM	20	Aníbal Godoy	(yellow card) 27'
RW	11	Armando Cooper	(yellow card) 90+11'
LW	19	Alberto Quintero	(yellow card) 89'
CF	10	Luis Tejada	(red card) 25'
CF	9	Roberto Nurse	(yellow card) 79'	(substituted off) 79'
Substitutions:
FW	22	Abdiel Arroyo		(substituted on) 79'
DF	17	Luis Henríquez		(substituted on) 87' (substituted off) 109'
MF	4	Alfredo Stephens		(substituted on) 109'
Manager:
(Colombia) Hernán Darío Gómez

GK	13	Guillermo Ochoa
CB	5	Diego Reyes
CB	2	Francisco Rodríguez
CB	15	Oswaldo Alanís		(substituted off) 46'
RWB	22	Paul Aguilar	(yellow card) 90+13'
LWB	7	Miguel Layún		(substituted off) 77'
RM	6	Héctor Herrera	(yellow card) 55'	(substituted off) 59'
CM	8	Jonathan dos Santos
LM	18	Andrés Guardado (c)
CF	19	Oribe Peralta
CF	11	Carlos Vela	(yellow card) 4'
Substitutions:
MF	21	Carlos Esquivel		(substituted on) 46'
FW	9	Jesús Corona		(substituted on) 59'
FW	14	Javier Orozco	(yellow card) 95'	(substituted on) 77'
Manager:
Miguel Herrera

Assistant referees:
Philippe Brière (Canada)
Daniel Belleau (Canada)
Fourth official:
Joel Aguilar (El Salvador)

== Third place play-off ==
July 25, 2015
16:00

United States	1–1 (a.e.t.)	Panama
Dempsey 70'	Report	Nurse 55'
Penalties
Jóhannsson (penalty scored); Dempsey (penalty scored); Johnson (penalty missed); Bradley (penalty missed); Beasley (penalty missed)	2–3	(penalty scored) R. Torres; (penalty scored) Arroyo; (penalty missed) Cooper; (penalty scored) Cummings

PPL Park, Chester
Attendance: 12,598
Referee: Óscar Moncada (Honduras)

**United States**	**Panama**

GK	1	Brad Guzan
CB	6	John Brooks
CB	3	Omar Gonzalez		(substituted off) 90'
CB	15	Tim Ream
RM	19	Graham Zusi		(substituted off) 59'
CM	4	Michael Bradley (c)
CM	24	Joe Corona
LM	23	Fabian Johnson	(yellow card) 29'
RF	21	Timothy Chandler	(yellow card) 98'
CF	18	Chris Wondolowski		(substituted off) 59'
LF	9	Aron Jóhannsson
Substitutions:
FW	8	Clint Dempsey		(substituted on) 59'
DF	2	DeAndre Yedlin	(yellow card) 98'	(substituted on) 59'
DF	25	DaMarcus Beasley		(substituted on) 90'
Manager:
(Germany) Jürgen Klinsmann

GK	12	Luis Mejía
RB	13	Adolfo Machado
CB	3	Harold Cummings
CB	5	Román Torres (c)	(yellow card) 114'
LB	15	Erick Davis
CM	14	Miguel Camargo		(substituted off) 46'
CM	20	Aníbal Godoy	(yellow card) 98'
RW	11	Armando Cooper	(yellow card) 86'
LW	19	Alberto Quintero
CF	16	Rolando Blackburn		(substituted off) 87'
CF	9	Roberto Nurse
Substitutions:
MF	4	Alfredo Stephens		(substituted on) 46'	(substituted off) 91'
FW	22	Abdiel Arroyo		(substituted on) 87'
MF	18	Darwin Pinzón		(substituted on) 91'
Manager:
(Colombia) Hernán Darío Gómez

Assistant referees:
Garnet Page (Jamaica)
Cristian Ramírez (Honduras)
Fourth official:
David Gantar (Canada)
Fifth official:
Octavio Jara (Costa Rica)

== Final ==
July 26, 2015
20:00 EDT (UTC−4) (Note: The kickoff time was delayed by 30 minutes.)

Jamaica	1–3	Mexico
Mattocks 79'	Report	Guardado 31'; Corona 46'; Peralta 61'

Lincoln Financial Field, Philadelphia
Attendance: 68,930
Referee: Joel Aguilar (El Salvador)

**Jamaica**	**Mexico**

GK	23	Ryan Thompson
RB	19	Adrian Mariappa
CB	3	Michael Hector
CB	4	Wes Morgan
LB	20	Kemar Lawrence	(yellow card) 37'	(substituted off) 55'
RM	22	Garath McCleary		(substituted off) 59'
CM	15	Je-Vaughn Watson	(yellow card) 23'	(substituted off) 88'
CM	17	Rodolph Austin	(yellow card) 30'
LM	10	Jobi McAnuff
CF	18	Simon Dawkins		(substituted off) 73'
CF	9	Giles Barnes
Substitutions:
FW	11	Darren Mattocks		(substituted on) 59'
MF	2	Chris Humphrey		(substituted on) 73'
FW	8	Michael Seaton		(substituted on) 88'
Manager:
(Germany) Winfried Schäfer

GK	13	Guillermo Ochoa
RWB	22	Paul Aguilar
CB	5	Diego Reyes	(yellow card) 34'
CB	2	Francisco Rodríguez
CB	15	Oswaldo Alanís
LWB	7	Miguel Layún
CM	20	Jesús Dueñas	(yellow card) 6'	(substituted off) 85'
CM	8	Jonathan dos Santos
CM	18	Andrés Guardado		(substituted off) 61'
CF	9	Jesús Corona		(substituted off) 81'
CF	19	Oribe Peralta
Substitutions:
DF	17	Jorge Torres Nilo		(substituted on) 61'
MF	21	Carlos Esquivel		(substituted on) 81'
FW	14	Javier Orozco		(substituted on) 85'
Manager:
Miguel Herrera

Assistant referees:
Juan Zumba (El Salvador)
CJ Morgante (United States)
Fourth official:
John Pitti (Panama)
Fifth official:
Leonel Leal (Panama)
