= Abel Martínez (footballer) =

Cuban footballer (born 1993)

Personal information
- Full name: Abel Juan Martínez Colón
- Date of birth: 3 June 1990 (age 36)
- Place of birth: Havana, Cuba
- Height: 1.87 m (6 ft 2 in)
- Position: Defender

Team information
- Current team: Villaralbo

Senior career*
Years	Team	Apps	(Gls)
2012–2015	La Habana		
2016	Cruz Azul Premier		
2016–2019	La Habana		
2019–2020	CD Castilla Palencia		
2020	Lynx F.C.		
2020–	Villaralbo		

International career^{‡}
2013	Cuba U20	9	(0)
2016	Cuba	2	(0)
- * Club domestic league appearances and goals as of 15 May 2021 ‡ National team caps and goals as of 30 March 2016

Abel Juan Martínez Colón (born 3 June 1993) is a Cuban international football player, who currently plays for GCE Villaralbo in the Primera Regional of Castille and León.

== Club career ==
Back in Cuba, he played for his native provincial team La Habana.

In November 2020, Martínez signed for Spanish club GCE Villaralbo.

=== Doping case ===
Martinez was allowed by the Cuban FA to sign professional terms with Mexican side Cruz Azul Premier alongside compatriot Maykel Reyes in 2016, only to be suspended for two years by FIFA for use of the banned substance furosemide while on Olympic duty with Cuba in Canada in September 2015. Cruz Azul dismissed him subsequently, leaving him to work as a model while living with his girlfriend in Puebla.

== International career ==
Martinez has played in the 2013 CONCACAF U-20 Championship, 2013 FIFA U-20 World Cup and the 2014 Central American and Caribbean Games tournament.

He made his senior international debut for Cuba in a January 2016 friendly match against Panama and has, as of January 2018, earned a total of 2 caps, scoring no goals.
