= Jean Márquez =

Guatemalan footballer (born 1985)

Personal information
- Full name: Jean Jonathan Márquez Orellana
- Date of birth: 6 March 1985 (age 41)
- Place of birth: Barrio San Francisco, Guatemala
- Height: 1.71 m (5 ft 7 in)
- Position: Midfielder

Team information
- Current team: Mixco
- Number: 12

Senior career*
Years	Team	Apps	(Gls)
2006–2008	Jalapa	63	(3)
2008–2019	Comunicaciones	462	(35)
2019–	Mixco	128	(15)

International career
2008–2019	Guatemala	48	(4)
- * Club domestic league appearances and goals as of 21:40, 19 March 2025 (UTC)

Jean Jonathan Márquez Orellana (born 6 March 1985) is a Guatemalan professional footballer who plays as a midfielder for and captains Liga Nacional club Mixco.

== Club career ==
=== Comunicaciones ===
On 3 June 2019, it was confirmed that Márquez would depart from the club.

=== Mixco ===
Two days after departing from Comunicaciones, Mixco announced the official signing of Márquez.

== International career ==
On 23 June 2015, Márquez was called up by Iván Sopegno for Guatemala's 23-man squad for the 2015 CONCACAF Gold Cup.

== Personal life ==
In 2020, Márquez launched his own clothing brand called JM12. In November of the same year, the brand became the new sponsor of Mixco.

== Career statistics ==
=== International goals ===
Scores and results list Guatemala's goal tally first.

No.	Date	Venue	Opponent	Score	Result	Competition
1	10 February 2016	Estadio Mateo Flores, Guatemala City, Guatemala	Honduras	2–1	3–1	Friendly
2	2 March 2016	Estadio Mateo Flores, Guatemala City, Guatemala	El Salvador	1–0	1–0	Friendly
3	6 September 2016	Estadio Mateo Flores, Guatemala City, Guatemala	Saint Vincent and the Grenadines	9–2	9–3	2018 FIFA World Cup qualification
4	5 September 2019	Estadio Mateo Flores, Guatemala City, Guatemala	Anguilla	10–0	10–0	2019–20 CONCACAF Nations League C

== Honours ==
Jalapa

- Liga Nacional: Apertura 2008

Comunicaciones

- Liga Nacional: Apertura 2009, Clausura 2011, Apertura 2011, Clausura 2013, Apertura 2013, Clausura 2014, Apertura 2014, Clausura 2015

Mixco

- Primera División de Ascenso: Clausura 2022
