= Paulo César Motta =

Guatemalan footballer

Personal information
- Full name: Paulo César Motta Donis
- Date of birth: March 29, 1982 (age 44)
- Place of birth: Guatemala City, Guatemala
- Height: 1.81 m (5 ft 11 1/2 in)
- Position: Goalkeeper

Youth career
- 2001: Petapa

Senior career*
Years	Team	Apps	(Gls)
2002–2003	Juventud Retalteca	24	(0)
2003–2004	Aurora	6	(0)
2004–2008	Municipal	104	(0)
2009	Jalapa	4	(0)
2009	Zacapa	0	(0)
2010	USAC	23	(0)
2010–2013	Mictlán	45	(0)
2014–2017	Municipal	99	(0)
2017–2018	Sanarate	45	(0)
2018–2019	Municipal	23	(0)
2019	Cobán Imperial	19	(0)
2020	Quiché	0	(0)
2020	Tellioz	0	(0)
2020	Zacapa	16	(0)
2021	Mixco	7	(0)
2021–2022	Coatepeque	3	(0)
2022–2023	Mixco	1	(0)

International career^{‡}
2003–2018	Guatemala	36	(0)
- * Club domestic league appearances and goals as of 27 February 2010 ‡ National team caps and goals as of 27 February 2010

Paulo César Motta Donis (born 29 March 1982) is a Guatemalan former professional footballer who played as a goalkeeper.

== Club career ==
He represented club CSD Municipal in the tournament of Copa Interclubes UNCAF 2006. Finding it hard to become the number one goalkeeper behind Panamanian international Jaime Penedo he joined Deportivo Jalapa in 2009. After claims he would stay with Jalapa in June 2009, he eventually left them in September, apparently due to administrative problems. He joined USAC for the 2009/2010 Clausura championship along with Selvin Motta and Honduran veteran striker Milton Núñez.

In June 2010 he joined newly promoted Mictlan., He left Mictlan in 2013.

In 2014, he returned to CDS Municipal, and being the number one goalkeeper, since joining them he played in three finals of Guatemala's Tournament, on the Apertura 2014 and Clausura 2015, which CSD Municipal lost to CDS Comunicaciones, and on the Apertura 2016, which the club lost to Antigua GFC on Penalties, despite Motta saving one penalty.

For much of the Clausura 2017, he was injured and was replaced by Goalkeeper Nicholas Hagen, he missed the rest of the tournament, which saw CSD Municipal being crowned champions for the first time since 2011 against Deportivo Guastatoya, he was released on a free transfer after the tournament.

For the Apertura 2017 he signed for recently promoted team "Deportivo Sanarate".

== International career ==
Motta made his debut for Guatemala in an August 2003 friendly match against Ecuador and went on to collect a total of 13 caps, scoring no goals. He has represented his country at the UNCAF Nations Cup 2005, and the 2005 and 2007 CONCACAF Gold Cup Finals, although he did not come off the bench at the latter tournament.

He's first international match was a November 2007 friendly match against Honduras. He was part of Guatemala's National team that played in the Copa Oro 2015 in which he managed to kept a clean sheet against Mexico, however, Guatemala was knockout of the cup after a 1-0 to Cuba in the final match of the Copa Oro 2015.

On March 25, 2016, Motta made outstanding saves as Guatemala won against United States in a 2018 World Cup Qualification Match, their first victory over United States since 1983.
