= Joevin Jones =

Trinidadian footballer (born 1991)

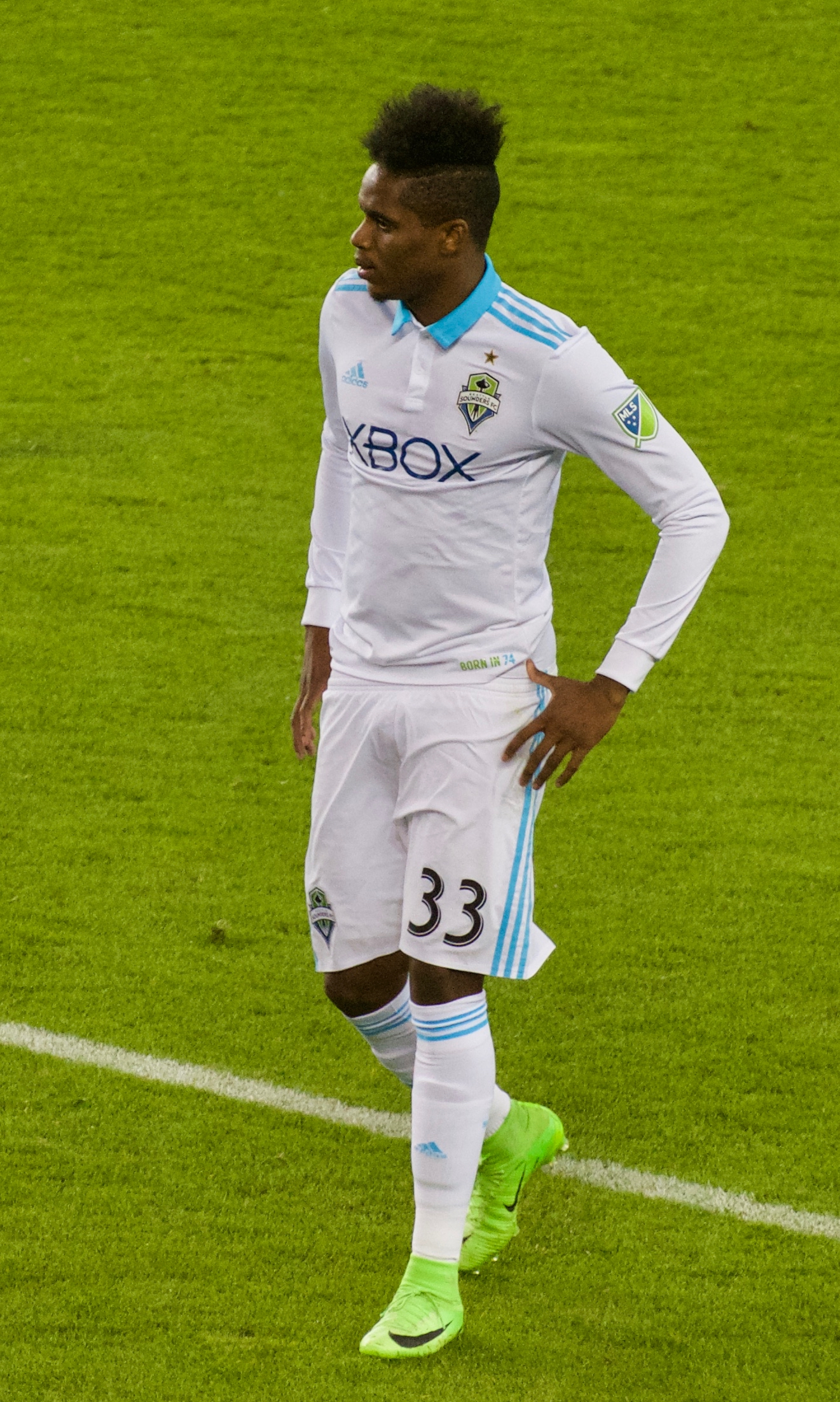
- Jones with Seattle Sounders FC in 2017

Personal information
- Full name: Joevin Martin Jones
- Date of birth: 3 August 1991 (age 35)
- Place of birth: Carenage, Trinidad and Tobago
- Height: 1.76 m (5 ft 9 in)
- Position: Left-back

Team information
- Current team: Central FC

Youth career
- 2005–2007: Defence Force
- 2005–2009: Mucurapo Senior Comprehensive
- 2007–2009: W Connection

Senior career*
Years	Team	Apps	(Gls)
2009–2014	W Connection	55	(28)
2014	→ HJK Helsinki (loan)	6	(0)
2015	Chicago Fire	28	(1)
2016–2017	Seattle Sounders FC	63	(3)
2018–2019	Darmstadt 98	44	(6)
2019–2020	Seattle Sounders FC	30	(2)
2021–2022	Inter Miami CF	18	(0)
2022	Inter Miami II	5	(0)
2023–2025	Police FC		(16)
2025–	Central FC		

International career^{‡}
2011	Trinidad and Tobago U20	4	(0)
2011–2012	Trinidad and Tobago U23	8	(0)
2010–	Trinidad and Tobago	103	(14)
- * Club domestic league appearances and goals as of 4 August 2026 ‡ National team caps and goals as of 4 August 2026

Joevin Martin Jones (born 3 August 1991) is a Trinidadian professional footballer who plays as a left-back for Central FC and the Trinidad and Tobago national team.

Jones' professional career began with W Connection in his native Trinidad and Tobago, where he made his first-team debut in 2009, at the age of 17. During his time with the Savonetta Boys, Jones won the TT Pro League title twice and the FA Trophy in 2013–14. After his fourth season with W Connection, in 2014, he was loaned to Finnish club HJK Helsinki. Jones then moved to Major League Soccer side Chicago Fire for the 2015 season before spending the 2016 and 2017 seasons with Seattle Sounders FC. He joined German 2. Bundesliga club Darmstadt on 1 January 2018. He later returned to Seattle Sounders FC on 7 May 2019.

In international football, Jones made his Trinidad and Tobago debut in September 2010, at the age of 19. With the Soca Warriors he has participated in three major tournaments with appearances in the CONCACAF Gold Cup (2013, 2015 and 2019). He scored his first international goal in the 2015 Gold Cup and helped Trinidad and Tobago advance to the quarter-finals.

== Early life ==
Jones was born on 3 August 1991 in Carenage, Trinidad and Tobago, to parents Kelvin and Merlin. Joevin began playing football at the age of six and attributes his early passion for the sport to his father, who is a former defender for the Trinidad and Tobago national team. During his father's playing career, Kelvin woke up his three sons, Marvin, Joevin, and Alvin, to train each morning together. In fact, the three brothers consistently evaluate their siblings' performances following each match and suggest areas for improvement. Joevin began his football education when he attended coaching school from former Soca Warrior player and manager Ronald La Forest.

At the age of 14, Jones attended Mucurapo Senior Comprehensive in Port of Spain, Trinidad and also enrolled in the youth program at TT Pro League club Defence Force. However, after a couple of seasons with the Teteron Boys, Jones decided to switch to the youth program in Couva with fellow Pro League club W Connection. In 2008, playing as left-back, Jones led Mucurapo to the Secondary Schools Football League (SSFL) North Zone title and the national Intercol Big Five crown. He was also named among the top five best league players along with Mucurapo and future international teammate Kevin Molino.

== Club career ==
=== W Connection ===
==== Rise to the first team (2009–2012) ====
After spending two seasons in the club's youth program, Jones made his full professional debut for W Connection of the TT Pro League after making two appearances during the club's runners-up finish in the 2009 FA Trophy, including a midfield start in the final. In his first league season, Jones cemented a position in the starting eleven, appearing seven times and scoring on two occasions, which were motivation for his first national team call-up in September 2010. After a series of consecutive starts for the Soca Warriors, Jones garnered interest from several clubs in the United States. In February 2011, Jones and W Connection teammate Shahdon Winchester were invited for a trial with the Colorado Rapids of Major League Soccer. This was followed with a further two-week trial with Toronto FC. However, the two trials proved unsuccessful and he was ultimately released. Upon his return to Trinidad and Tobago, Joevin was a catalyst in leading W Connection to the club's fourth Pro League championship finishing the season with ten appearances and two goals. Following the season, Jones helped the Savonetta Boys finish runners-up in the 2012 CFU Club Championship and earn a place in the 2012–13 CONCACAF Champions League.

He began the 2012–13 season with the winning goal in the Digicel Charity Shield earning the man of the match award. During the Champions League campaign, he appeared in three matches and scored a goal in a 3–2 defeat to Xelajú in Couva. Afterwards, he went on to enjoy a breakout season with W Connection leading the club with ten league goals and 19 goals in all competitions, including his first career hat-trick as a professional in a 5–2 win against Police. In February 2013, Jones had another unsuccessful trial with Toronto FC during their pre-season. On 26 April, Jones scored two goals against Caledonia AIA en route to the Savonetta Boys topping their 2013 CFU Club Championship group to secure consecutive trips to the CONCACAF Champions League.

==== Assuming and stripped of the captaincy (2013–2014) ====
Jones was named team captain prior to the 2013–14 season and changed from the number 36 jersey in favour of number 10. In the 2013–14 CONCACAF Champions League, Joevin made appearances during the Savonetta Boys' first three group stage matches. However, on 22 September, Jones and W Connection teammate Daneil Cyrus competed in a minor league match featuring for Jones' hometown team of Carenage. As a result, Jones and Cyrus were suspended by the club and did not travel with the team to Houston for the club's final match against the Houston Dynamo. A week later, the club's disciplinary committee stripped Jones as team captain, assessed a fine of one month's salary, and serve a retroactive two match suspension. Joevin returned to help the Savonetta Boys win the TOYOTA Classic and FA Trophy crowns and was later named Pro League Player of the Month for November/December 2013. Joevin later had a two-week trial in Italy with Udinese shortened due to a "lack of dynamism required to compete at the Serie A level." Afterwards, Jones returned to lead W Connection to the club's fifth Pro League title and finish the season as runner-up to the Golden Boot with 14 goals – his most Pro League goals in a season.

On 1 September 2014, prior to the next season with W Connection, Jones agreed to join HJK Helsinki of the Veikkausliiga on a short-term loan for the remainder of the 2014 season. Three weeks later, Joevin made his league debut for HJK against IFK Mariehamn after coming on for Mika Väyrynen in the 69th minute. He made a further five starting appearances for the club in the final six matches of the season en route to the club winning the 2014 Veikkausliiga title and qualification for the 2015–16 UEFA Champions League.

=== Chicago Fire ===
On 3 December 2014, Jones signed with Major League Soccer club Chicago Fire on a one-year contract. Joevin made his league debut in the season's opening match, on 6 March 2015, starting in the back-line for the Fire in a 2–0 loss to the LA Galaxy at the StubHub Center. In his third consecutive start at left-back, Jones recorded his first assist of the season after setting up Harry Shipp in the 29th minute, which proved to be the lone goal for the Fire in a 2–1 loss to the San Jose Earthquakes. On 4 April, Joevin scored his first goal for the Chicago Fire after making a run into the Toronto FC penalty area and sliding a Shaun Maloney pass into the lower right corner for the match's opening goal.

In his first match after leading the Soca Warriors to the quarterfinals of the 2015 CONCACAF Gold Cup, Jones recorded his second assist of the season, on 22 July, during a 3–1 win over Orlando City SC in the Lamar Hunt U.S. Open Cup. In his first season in Major League Soccer, Jones made 28 league appearances and 31 in all competitions for the Fire having scored one goal and recording two assists.

=== Seattle Sounders FC ===
On 14 January 2016, Jones was traded from Chicago Fire to Seattle Sounders FC in exchange for the 15th overall draft pick in the 2016 MLS SuperDraft and general allocation money. Since Jones' preferred number 3 shirt was worn by United States international full-back Brad Evans, Joevin opted in favor to wear number 33 instead. One month later, Jones made his debut for the Sounders in a 2–2 draw against Club América during the quarterfinals first leg of the 2015–16 CONCACAF Champions League. However, after a streak of matches playing as a left wing-back, Jones made a substitute appearance as a winger and scored his first goal for the Sounders in a win against D.C. United on 1 June. Two weeks later, he scored his second goals for the club with a stoppage-time goal in a win over Kitsap Pumas during the Lamar Hunt U.S. Open Cup.

=== Darmstadt 98 ===
In July 2017, German club Darmstadt 98 announced they had signed Jones to a pre-contract which would take effect on 1 January 2018. The contract ran until 2020. He played in 44 matches for Darmstadt in the 2. Bundesliga and scored six goals, but left the club after a change in coaches.

=== Return to Seattle Sounders ===
Jones returned to the Sounders in 2019, stating that he felt more comfortable with the team.

=== Inter Miami ===
On 11 March 2021, Jones joined Inter Miami CF.

=== Police F.C. ===
In May 2023, Jones made his return to Trinidadian domestic football after eight years, signing with TT Premier Football League side Police F.C. on a short-term contract. He debuted on 16 May in a 1–0 loss to Central F.C.

== International career ==
Jones has represented Trinidad and Tobago on various levels of international competition, having been capped for the under-20, under-23 Olympic team, and the Trinidad and Tobago national teams.

=== Youth teams ===
In November 2010, Joevin made his debut for the under-20 team starting two matches in defence with Sheldon Bateau and Akeem Adams during their qualification for the 2011 CONCACAF U-20 Championship. During the continental tournament, he made two starts in a goalless draw to Cuba and in a 5–0 loss to Mexico. Although Trinidad and Tobago did not qualify for the 2011 FIFA U-20 World Cup, the Soca Warriors participated in the Pan American Games in October 2011, where Jones started in every match for the under-23 team. He made five additional starts during the under-23 team's unsuccessful qualification attempt in November 2011 and March 2012 for the Summer Olympics in London.

=== Senior team ===
==== Debut and making the starting eleven (2010–2012) ====
Jones made his full international debut for the national team on 7 September 2010, at the age of 19, in a match against Panama coming on as a second-half substitute for Aklie Edwards at left-back. Jones went on to play in six consecutive matches for the national team before selection in the squad's qualification attempt for the 2010 Caribbean Cup. His appearance streak continued for an additional two matches before a suspected calf injury kept him out against Haiti. Jones made his return in the Soca Warriors' first match of the 2010 Caribbean Cup against Cuba. After appearing for the national team in September 2010, Jones enjoyed an active role in the team finishing the year with eleven appearances.

After not featuring during the national team's disappointing qualification campaign for the 2014 FIFA World Cup in Brazil, Joevin made his international return in a friendly match against Finland on 22 January 2012. However, after missing out on another friendly against Antigua and Barbuda a month later, he again returned on 15 August in a loss to Canada. In November and December 2012, Jones helped lead the national team through qualification and a runners-up finish in the 2012 Caribbean Cup to qualify for the country's first CONCACAF Gold Cup in six years.

==== Impressive Gold Cup performance (2013–2014) ====
In the build-up to the 2013 CONCACAF Gold Cup, Jones started in friendlies against Belize and Peru in March 2013. He also started in consecutive losses to Romania and Estonia in June, respectively, during the national team's first visit to European soil since the 2006 FIFA World Cup in Germany. After the Gold Cup draw, Trinidad and Tobago entered Group B along with El Salvador, Haiti, and Honduras. Based on his performances in the previous friendlies, Joevin was named in the final squad for the 2013 CONCACAF Gold Cup on 28 July.

Jones started at left-back in the Soca Warriors' first group match against El Salvador. He struggled to provide accurate passing throughout the match. However, with Trinidad and Tobago needing a goal, Joevin provided the long ball in the 73rd minute that set-up Kenwyne Jones' goal to secure a vital draw for the Warriors. He also started in the match between Haiti and Trinidad and Tobago. Jones showed a definite improvement compared to his group match against El Salvador providing numerous overlapping runs and several crosses into the penalty area. However, in the 60th minute, Jones suffered from a late sliding tackle resulting in an ankle injury and an early second-half substitution. In the final group match between the Warriors and Honduras, Jones returned from injury and made his third consecutive start in the backline. Trinidad and Tobago went on to win the match 2–0 and advance to the quarterfinals for the first time since 2000. However, Jones did not take part in the 1–0 loss to Mexico due to a hamstring injury prior to the quarterfinal match.

Following a successful performance during the 2013 CONCACAF Gold Cup, Jones did not travel with the team to Saudi Arabia for the 2013 OSN Cup as he received a break from international duties to recover from fatigue. However, after being stripped as W Connection's captain and subsequent club suspension for competing in a minor league match on 22 September 2013, Jones was dropped from the national team for the Soca Warriors friendly match against New Zealand the following month. Jones was reinstated to the national team for a pair of matches against Caribbean rivals Jamaica and made a start in the return match in Port of Spain on 19 November 2013.

On 4 June 2014, Jones started in midfield in a 3–0 loss during a send-off series match for Argentina at Estadio Monumental prior to the 2014 FIFA World Cup. Four days later, he was a second-half substitute replacing Ataullah Guerra for the Soca Warriors in a 2–0 loss to Iran in Arena Corinthians.

==== Transition to attacking midfielder (2015–present) ====
On 9 July 2015 Jones scored his first international goal in a group match of the tournament versus Guatemala. On 15 July on the last play of the last group match against Mexico, he delivered a well-placed corner kick, despite being pelted with garbage by Mexican fans. Yohance Marshall headed the pass into goal, tying the score at 4-4 and securing first place in group for the Soca Warriors.

== Career statistics ==
=== Club ===
As of 13 December 2020

Club	Season	League			Cup		League Cup (Note: Includes appearances in the Trinidad and Tobago's Classic, Goal Shield, and Pro Bowl)		Continental (Note: Includes appearances in the CONCACAF Champions League)		Other (Note: Includes appearances in the Trinidad and Tobago Charity Shield, Caribbean Club Championship, MLS Cup Playoffs and MLS is Back Tournament knockout stage)		Total	
Club	Season	Division	Apps	Goals	Apps	Goals	Apps	Goals	Apps	Goals	Apps	Goals	Apps	Goals
W Connection	2009	TT Pro League	0	0	2	0	0	0	0	0	0	0	2	0
W Connection	2010–11	TT Pro League	7	2	1	0	3	0	0	0	0	0	11	2
W Connection	2011–12	TT Pro League	10	2	4	0	5	0	0	0	5	0	24	2
W Connection	2012–13	TT Pro League	15	10	1	0	9	5	3	1	3	3	31	19
W Connection	2013–14	TT Pro League	23	14	5	0	8	2	3	0	0	0	39	16
W Connection	Total		55	28	13	0	25	7	6	1	8	3	107	39
HJK (loan)	2014	Veikkausliiga	6	0	0	0	0	0	0	0	0	0	6	0
HJK (loan)	Total		6	0	0	0	0	0	0	0	0	0	6	0
Chicago Fire	2015	Major League Soccer	28	1	3	0	–		–		–		31	1
Chicago Fire	Total		28	1	3	0	0	0	0	0	0	0	31	1
Seattle Sounders FC	2016	Major League Soccer	33	2	2	1	–		2	0	6	0	43	3
Seattle Sounders FC	2017	Major League Soccer	30	1	1	0	–		–		5	0	36	1
Seattle Sounders FC	Total		63	3	3	1	0	0	2	0	11	0	79	4
Darmstadt 98	2017–18	2. Bundesliga	16	4	0	0	–		–		0	0	16	4
Darmstadt 98	2018–19	2. Bundesliga	28	2	2	0	–		–		0	0	30	2
Darmstadt 98	Total		44	6	2	0	0	0	0	0	0	0	46	6
Seattle Sounders FC	2019	Major League Soccer	17	0	0	0	–		–		4	0	21	0
Seattle Sounders FC	2020	Major League Soccer	13	2	–		–		2	0	5	0	20	2
Seattle Sounders FC	Total		30	2	0	0	0	0	2	0	9	0	41	2
Inter Miami CF	2021	Major League Soccer	0	0	0	0	–		–		0	0	0	0
Inter Miami CF	Total		0	0	0	0	0	0	0	0	0	0	0	0
Career total			226	40	21	1	25	7	10	1	28	3	310	52

=== International ===
As of match played 27 March 2023

==== International goals ====
Scores and results list Trinidad and Tobago's goal tally first.

No.	Date	Venue	Cap	Opponent	Score	Result	Competition
1	9 July 2015	Soldier Field, Chicago, United States	42	Guatemala	3–0	3–1	2015 CONCACAF Gold Cup
2	4 September 2015	Rio Tinto Stadium, Sandy, United States	46	Mexico	3–2	3–3	Friendly
3	24 March 2016	Arnos Vale Stadium, Kingstown, Saint Vincent and the Grenadines	52	Saint Vincent and the Grenadines	2–1	3–2	2018 FIFA World Cup qualification
4	29 March 2016	Hasely Crawford Stadium, Port of Spain, Trinidad and Tobago	53	Saint Vincent and the Grenadines	2–0	6–0	2018 FIFA World Cup qualification
5	2 September 2016	Hasely Crawford Stadium, Port of Spain, Trinidad and Tobago	54	Guatemala	1–1	2–2	2018 FIFA World Cup qualification
6	2 September 2016	Hasely Crawford Stadium, Port of Spain, Trinidad and Tobago	54	Guatemala	2–1	2–2	2018 FIFA World Cup qualification
7	1 September 2017	Ato Boldon Stadium, Couva, Trinidad and Tobago	64	Honduras	1–2	1–2	2018 FIFA World Cup qualification
8	23 March 2018	Stade René Serge Nabajoth, Les Abymes, Guadeloupe	68	Guadeloupe	1–0	1–0	Friendly
9	6 September 2019	Stade Pierre-Aliker, Fort-de-France, Martinique	76	Martinique	1–1	1–1	2019–20 CONCACAF Nations League A
10	28 March 2021	Mayagüez Athletics Stadium, Mayagüez, Puerto Rico	79	Puerto Rico	1–0	1–1	2022 FIFA World Cup qualification
11	24 March 2023	Thomas Robinson Stadium, Nassau, Bahamas	86	Bahamas	2–0	3–0	2022–23 CONCACAF Nations League B
12	27 March 2023	Dwight Yorke Stadium, Bacolet, Trinidad and Tobago	87	Nicaragua	1–1	1–1	2022–23 CONCACAF Nations League B

== Honours ==
W Connection

- TT Pro League: 2011–12, 2013–14
- FA Trophy: 2013–14

Seattle Sounders

- MLS Cup: 2016, 2019
