= Édgar Chinchilla =

Guatemalan footballer

Personal information
- Full name: Édgar David Chinchilla López
- Date of birth: 8 May 1987 (age 39)
- Place of birth: Guatemala City, Guatemala
- Height: 1.80 m (5 ft 11 in)
- Position: Striker

Youth career
- 2006: Comunicaciones

Senior career*
Years	Team	Apps	(Gls)
2006-2008	Comunicaciones	21	(0)
2008-2009	Jalapa	23	(1)
2009–2010	Comunicaciones	39	(5)
2010–2011	Malacateco	18	(2)
2011–2015	Xelajú	129	(23)
2015–2016	Antigua	35	(5)
2016–2018	Comunicaciones	53	(9)
2018–2019	Aurora		
2019–2020	Comunicaciones	15	(2)

International career
2009–2015	Guatemala	7	(0)
- * Club domestic league appearances and goals

Édgar David Chinchilla López (born 8 May 1987 in Guatemala City) is a retired Guatemalan footballer who played as a striker.

== International ==
Chinchilla made his debut for the Guatemala national football team on 29 June 2009 against Mexico, coming on as a late substitute. He then made his second appearance for the Guatemala national team on 7 September 2012 against Japan coming on as a half-time substitute for Johnny Alexander Girón Ochoa.

== Honours ==
Jalapa

- Liga Nacional de Guatemala: Clausura 2009

Comunicaciones

- Liga Nacional de Guatemala: Apertura 2011

Xelajú

- Liga Nacional de Guatemala: Clausura 2012

Antigua

- Liga Nacional de Guatemala: Apertura 2016
