= Elías Vásquez =

Guatemalan footballer

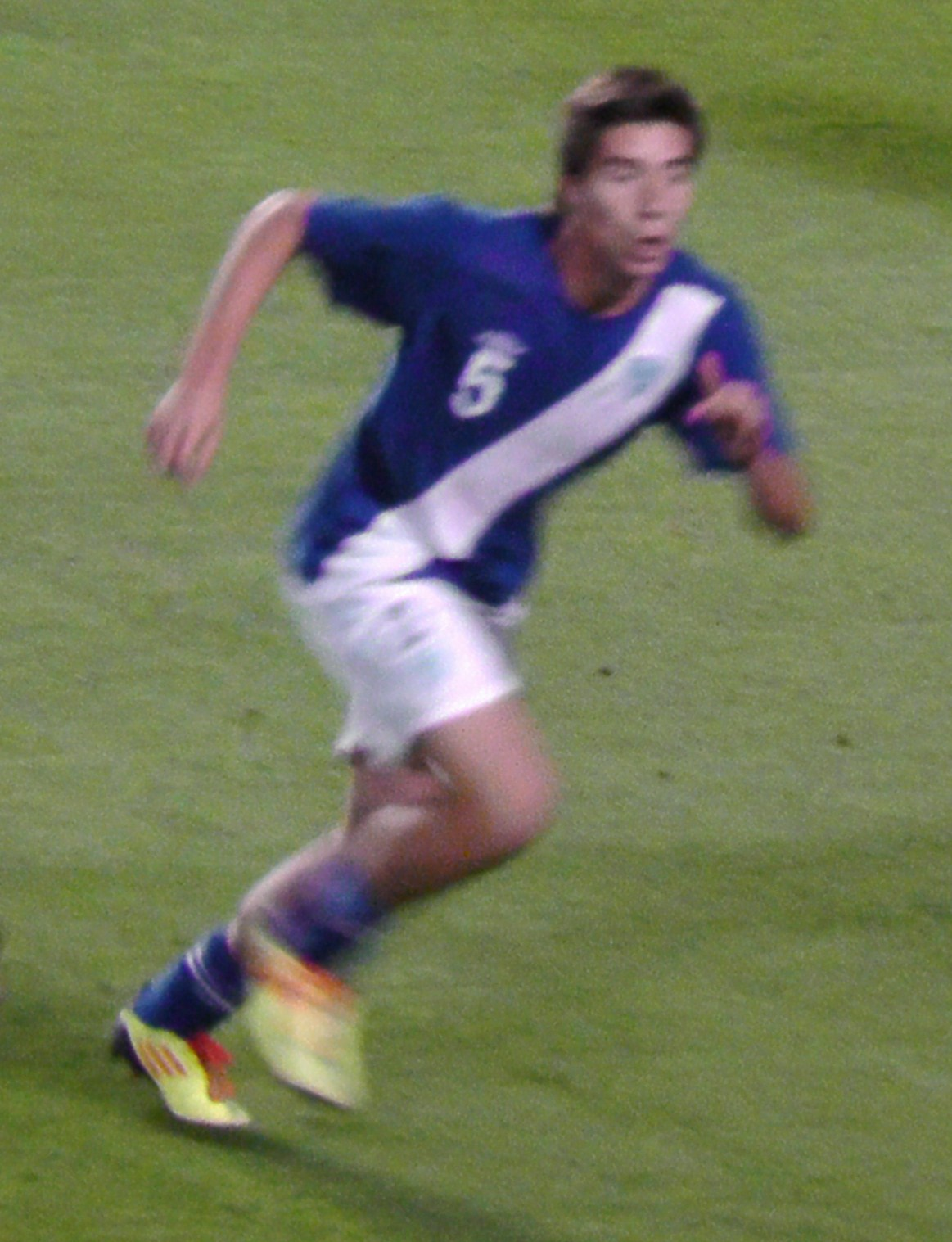
- Vásquez playing for Guatemala in 2013

Personal information
- Full name: Elías Enoc Vásquez Prera
- Date of birth: 18 June 1992 (age 34)
- Place of birth: Guatemala City, Guatemala
- Height: 1.85 m (6 ft 1 in)
- Position: Centre-back

Team information
- Current team: Marquense

Senior career*
Years	Team	Apps	(Gls)
2011–2014	Comunicaciones	86	(1)
2014–2015	Dorados	0	(0)
2015	Real Salt Lake	15	(0)
2016–2017	Deportivo Anzoátegui	15	(0)
2017–2019	Comunicaciones	25	(0)
2019	Sanarate	43	(0)
2020–2021	Cobán Imperial	45	(1)
2022	Sololá	8	(0)
2022–2024	Marquense	80	(3)
2024–2025	Xinabajul	37	(0)
2025-	Marquense	27	(1)

International career
2011	Guatemala U20	9	(1)
2011–2018	Guatemala	40	(0)
- * Club domestic league appearances and goals as of 20:00, 17 January 2025 (UTC)

Elías Enoc Vásquez Prera (born 18 June 1992) is a Guatemalan professional footballer who plays as a defender for Liga Nacional club Marquense.

== Club career ==
=== CSD Comunicaciones (2011-2014) ===
Vásquez began his professional career at Comunicaciones. He scored his first league goal in July 2012 against Marquense.

=== Dorados de Sinaloa (2014-2015) ===
He was signed by Dorados in June 2014.

=== Real Salt Lake (2015) ===
Vásquez signed with Major League Soccer club Real Salt Lake on 24 February 2015. He was released following the 2015 season.

== International career ==
In 2011, he was the captain of the Guatemala U-20 squad that competed at the 2011 FIFA U-20 World Cup, and was then called up to the senior national team, making his full international debut against Jamaica at the 2011 CONCACAF Gold Cup.

== Honours ==
Comunicaciones

- Liga Nacional de Guatemala: Apertura 2011, Clausura 2013, Apertura 2013, Clausura 2014, Apertura 2014

Marquense

- Primera División: Clausura 2024
- Primera División Promotion: 2023-2024

== Career statistics ==
Club	Season	League		Domestic Cup		International		Total	
Club	Season	Apps	Goals	Apps	Goals	Apps	Goals	Apps	Goals
Comunicaciones	2011—12	25	—	—	—	—	—	25	—
Comunicaciones	2012—13	26	1	—	—	—	—	26	1
Comunicaciones	2013—14	35	—	—	—	3	—	38	—
Comunicaciones	Total	86	1	—	—	3	—	89	1
Dorados	2014—15	—	—	4	—	—	—	4	—
Dorados	Total	—	—	4	—	—	—	4	—
Real Salt Lake	2015	15	—	2	—	3	—	20	—
Real Salt Lake	Total	15	—	2	—	3	—	20	—
Career total		101	1	6	—	6	—	113	1
