= Hánier Dranguet =

Cuban footballer

Personal information
- Full name: Hánier Humberto Dranguet Castillo
- Date of birth: September 2, 1982 (age 44)
- Place of birth: Guantánamo, Cuba
- Height: 1.70 m (5 ft 7 in)
- Position: Defender

Senior career*
| Years | Team | Apps | (Gls) |
| –2017 | Guantánamo | | |
| 2017– | Ciego de Ávila | | |

International career^{‡}
| 2008–2015 | Cuba | 38 | (1) |
- * Club domestic league appearances and goals ‡ National team caps and goals as of 1 January 2018

Hánier Humberto Dranguet Castillo (born 2 September 1982) is a Cuban football defender, who currently plays for Ciego de Ávila.

== Club career ==
The defender played a large part of his career for hometown club Guantánamo but left them for Ciego de Ávila in 2017.

== International career ==
Dranguet made his international debut for Cuba in a June 2008 FIFA World Cup qualification match against Antigua & Barbuda and has earned a total of 38 caps, scoring 1 goal. He represented his country in 4 FIFA World Cup qualifying matches and played at the 2011 CONCACAF Gold Cup where he played in two matches.

=== International goals ===
Scores and results list Cuba's goal tally first.

| Number | Date | Location | Opponent | Score | Result | Competition |
|---|---|---|---|---|---|---|
| 1 | 27 October 2008 | Estadio Pedro Marrero, Havana, Cuba | Suriname | 6-0 | 6-0 | 2008 Caribbean Cup qualification |
