= Keron Cummings =

Trinidadian footballer (born 1988)

Personal information
- Date of birth: 28 May 1988 (age 38)
- Place of birth: Port of Spain, Trinidad and Tobago
- Height: 1.72 m (5 ft 8 in)
- Position: Midfielder

Team information
- Current team: Central FC
- Number: 8

Senior career*
Years	Team	Apps	(Gls)
2010–2012	W Connection		(0)
2012–2014	Westside Superstarz		
2014	St. Ann's Rangers		
2014–2016	North East Stars		
2017–2018	Central FC		
2018	Morvant Caledonia United		
2019–2022	La Horquetta Rangers		
2023–	Central FC		

International career^{‡}
2010–2017	Trinidad and Tobago	14	(3)
- * Club domestic league appearances and goals as of 29 May 2010 ‡ National team caps and goals as of 10 March 2017

Keron Cummings (born 28 May 1988), is a Trinidadian professional footballer who plays as a midfielder for Central FC. He made 14 appearances for the Trinidad and Tobago national team scoring three goals.

== Career statistics ==
Scores and results list Trinidad and Tobago's goal tally first.

No	Date	Venue	Opponent	Score	Result	Competition
1.	15 July 2015	Bank of America Stadium, Charlotte, United States	Mexico	1–2	4–4	2015 CONCACAF Gold Cup
2.	15 July 2015	Bank of America Stadium, Charlotte, United States	Mexico	3–2	4–4	2015 CONCACAF Gold Cup
3.	4 September 2015	Rio Tinto Stadium, Sandy, United States	Mexico	2–0	3–3	Friendly
