= Cordell Cato =

Trinidadian footballer

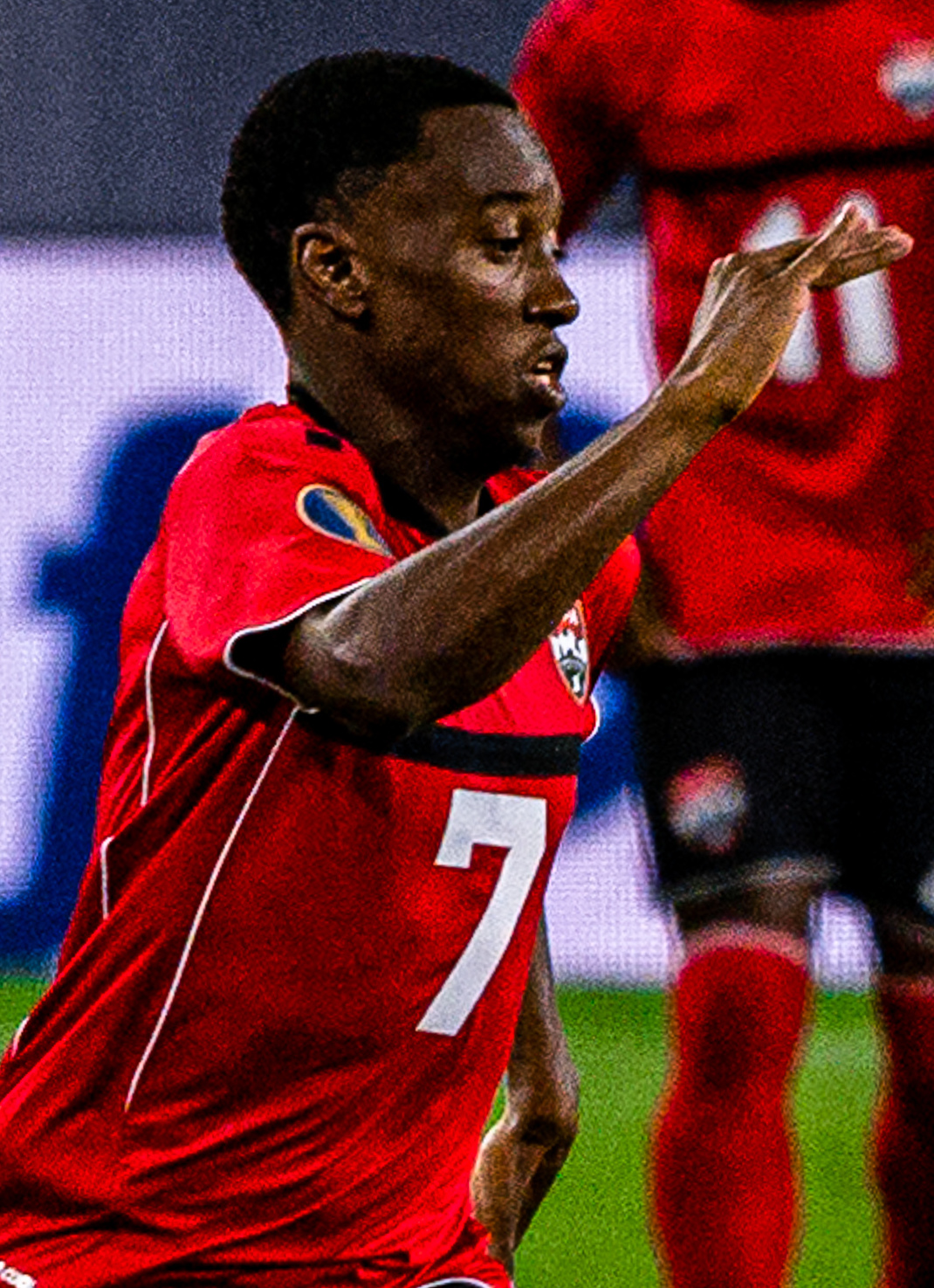
- Cato with Trinidad and Tobago at the 2019 CONCACAF Gold Cup

Personal information
- Full name: Cordell Cato
- Date of birth: July 15, 1992 (age 34)
- Place of birth: Carenage, Trinidad and Tobago
- Height: 5 ft 9 in (1.75 m)
- Positions: Winger; forward

Youth career
- 2003–2008: Defence Force

Senior career*
Years	Team	Apps	(Gls)
2009–2010	San Juan Jabloteh		
2011	Defence Force		
2012	Seattle Sounders FC	8	(0)
2013–2017	San Jose Earthquakes	111	(7)
2018	Charlotte Independence	24	(8)
2019–2020	Oklahoma City Energy	42	(5)

International career^{‡}
2011	Trinidad and Tobago U20	3	(0)
2014–2019	Trinidad and Tobago	32	(2)
- * Club domestic league appearances and goals as of April 4, 2021 ‡ National team caps and goals as of June 26, 2019

Cordell Cato (born July 15, 1992) is a Trinidadian footballer who last played for Oklahoma City Energy FC in the USL Championship.

== Career ==
On January 17, 2012, it was announced that Cato had signed with Seattle Sounders. After making 8 competitive appearances in one season, the Sounders declined to pick up a contract option on Cato.

Cato's MLS rights were traded to the San Jose Earthquakes on March 1, 2013. Cato's time with the Earthquakes came to an end when his contract expired on December 31, 2017. After his release by San Jose, he trialed with the Earthquakes' arch-rivals LA Galaxy, but ultimately was not signed.

On March 9, 2018, Cato signed with USL side Charlotte Independence for the 2018 season. He left Charlotte at the end of their 2018 season.

On January 9, 2019, Cato joined USL side OKC Energy.

== Personal life ==
Cato is currently married to Trinidad and Tobago women's national football team member Jonelle Warrick.

== Career statistics ==
=== International ===
Appearances and goals by national team and year
National team	Year	Apps	Goals
Trinidad and Tobago	2014	7	0
Trinidad and Tobago	2015	8	1
Trinidad and Tobago	2016	5	1
Trinidad and Tobago	2017	5	0
Trinidad and Tobago	2018	2	0
Trinidad and Tobago	2019	5	0
Total		32	2

Scores and results list Trinidad and Tobago's goal tally first, score column indicates score after each Cato goal.

List of international goals scored by Cordell Cato
No.	Date	Venue	Opponent	Score	Result	Competition
1	9 July 2015	Soldier Field, Chicago, United States	Guatemala	2–0	3–1	2015 CONCACAF Gold Cup
2	5 October 2016	Ato Boldon Stadium, Couva, Trinidad and Tobago	Dominican Republic	3–0	4–0	2017 Caribbean Cup qualification
