= Darwin Pinzón =

Panamanian footballer (born 1994)

Personal information
- Full name: Darwin Darinel Pinzón Camaño
- Date of birth: 2 April 1994 (age 32)
- Place of birth: Panama
- Height: 1.59 m (5 ft 3 in)
- Position: Right midfielder

Team information
- Current team: San Miguelito
- Number: 28

Senior career*
Years	Team	Apps	(Gls)
2011–2016	San Miguelito	70	(14)
2016	→ Carabobo (loan)	3	(1)
2017–	San Miguelito	5	(0)

International career^{‡}
2014–	Panama	7	(3)
- * Club domestic league appearances and goals as of 3 November 2017 ‡ National team caps and goals as of 3 November 2017

Darwin Darinel Pinzón Camaño (born 2 April 1994) is a Panamanian footballer who currently plays as a right midfielder for Panamanian club Sporting San Miguelito.

== Club career ==
In July 2015, Pinzón reportedly joined Spanish Third Division side Jumilla, but was denied a work permit and returned to Sporting San Miguelito in September 2015.

== International career ==
He played for Panama at the 2011 FIFA U-17 World Cup in Mexico.

Pinzón made a remarkable official début with the senior national team on 21 August 2014 against Cuba (4–0), as he scored twice in this match. He also scored at his unofficial (not FIFA-recognized) international début, against Guyana (2–0) in 2012.

== Honours ==
San Miguelito

- Liga Panameña de Fútbol (1): Clausura 2013

Panama

- CONCACAF Gold Cup third place: 2015
