= Dwane James =

Trinidad and Tobago footballer

Personal information
- Full name: Dwane Ronaldo James
- Date of birth: 4 December 1988 (age 37)
- Place of birth: Trinidad and Tobago
- Positions: Defender; midfielder

Senior career*
Years	Team	Apps	(Gls)
- Ma Pau Stars S.C.
- La Horquetta Rangers F.C.
2013	Orlando City SC	0	(0)
- San Juan Jabloteh F.C.
-2014/15	North East Stars F.C.		(1)
2015/2016	Barrackpore United SC		
2015/2016	Antigua GFC	5	(0)
2016/2017	S.V. Transvaal		
2016/17-2017/18	C.D. Pasaquina	30	(1)
2018	North East Stars F.C.		
2019-	Cunupia FC		(1)

International career^{‡}
2015–2019	Trinidad and Tobago	4	(0)
- * Club domestic league appearances and goals ‡ National team caps and goals as of 2 October 2019

Dwane Ronaldo James (born 4 December 1988 in Trinidad and Tobago) is a Trinidadian footballer.

== Career ==
At the age of 19, James went to the United States with East Central Community College but left after a year. After that, he trialed with American top flight side Sporting Kansas City as well as fourth division team Atlanta Silverbacks. Even though they were both unsuccessful, James considers them to be highlight of his career.

In 2015, he trialed for Saprissa.

From Barrackpore United SC in the Trinidadian second division, he signed for Antigua GFC in Guatemala, making 5 league appearances there.

In 2016, James signed for Surinamese outfit S.V. Transvaal, before joining C.D. Pasaquina in El Salvador.

Since 2015, he has made 4 appearances for the Trinidad and Tobago national team.

Despite not sharing the same surname, he is the older brother of Trinidad and Tobago international Kevin Molino.
