= Wilson Lalín =

Guatemalan footballer

Personal information
- Full name: Wilson Clemente Lalín Salvatierra
- Date of birth: 3 May 1985 (age 41)
- Place of birth: Retalhuleu, Guatemala
- Height: 1.86 m (6 ft 1 in)
- Position: Centre-back

Senior career*
Years	Team	Apps	(Gls)
2008–2011	Suchitepéquez		(2)
2011–2013	Marquense	70	(2)
2013–2018	Comunicaciones	168	(9)
2018	Sanarate	18	(2)
2019	Malacateco	12	(0)
2019	Iztapa	5	(0)
2019–2020	Quiché		
2020–2022	Mixco		
2022-	San Pedro		

International career^{‡}
2008–2016	Guatemala	27	(1)
- * Club domestic league appearances and goals ‡ National team caps and goals as of 14:35, 8 October 2019 (UTC)

Wilson Lalín (born 3 May 1985) is a Guatemalan professional footballer.

== Club career ==
=== Comunicaciones ===
On 17 May 2018, Lalín confirmed his departure from Comunicaciones on social media.

=== Sanarate ===
On 1 June, Sanarate announced the signing of Lalín.

== International career ==
Lalín was called up to the Guatemala team for the 2015 CONCACAF Gold Cup; he played in Guatemala's opening game.

== Career statistics ==
=== International goals ===
Scores and results list Guatemala's goal tally first.

No	Date	Venue	Opponent	Score	Result	Competition
1.	6 June 2015	Estadio Centenario, Montevideo, Uruguay	Uruguay	1–5	1–5	Friendly
