= Maikel Reyes =

Cuban footballer (born 1993)

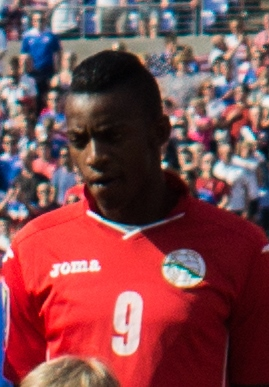
- Reyes with Cuba at the 2015 CONCACAF Gold Cup

Personal information
- Full name: Maikel Alejandro Reyes Azcuy
- Date of birth: 4 March 1993 (age 33)
- Place of birth: Viñales, Cuba
- Height: 1.83 m (6 ft 0 in)
- Position: Striker

Team information
- Current team: ART Municipal Jalapa

Senior career*
Years	Team	Apps	(Gls)
2012–2016	Pinar del Río		
2016	Cruz Azul Premier	18	(5)
2017	Villa Clara		
2018–2020	Pinar del Río		
2021–2022	C.D. Real Sociedad	19	(0)
2023–	Municipal Jalapa	48	(14)

International career^{‡}
2012–2013	Cuba U20	14	(7)
2014	Cuba U21	5	(2)
2012–2015	Cuba U23	9	(9)
2012–	Cuba	55	(13)
- * Club domestic league appearances and goals ‡ National team caps and goals as of 10 June 2025

Maikel Alejandro Reyes Azcuy (sometimes spelt as Maykel Reyes) is a Cuban professional footballer who plays for ART Municipal Jalapa in the Liga Primera de Nicaragua and the Cuba national team.

== Club career ==
In January 2016, he became the first Cuban footballer (along with Abel Martínez) to sign for a foreign club with the approval of the Cuban government's Institute of Sports, Physical Education and Recreation (INDER), when he signed for Mexican club side Cruz Azul.

He returned to Cuba in 2017 to play for Villa Clara, only to join hometown side Pinar del Río in 2018.

In January 2023, Reyes joined Municipal Jalapa until the end of the season.

== International career ==
Reyes was involved in the unsuccessful campaign to qualify for the 2012 Summer Olympics football tournament playing against Canada in March 2012 in the Olympic qualifying tournament.

In 2013, he participated in the CONCACAF U-20 Championship and the FIFA U-20 World Cup. In November 2013, he represented Cuba in the 2014 Central American and Caribbean Games, scoring against Honduras and Costa Rica.

Reyes made his senior international debut in October 2012 against Panama. and has, as of January 2018, earned a total of 13 caps, scoring two goals.

Reyes was named in the team for the 2015 CONCACAF Gold Cup. On July 15, he scored the only goal against Guatemala in the group stage to make Cuba qualify to the quarter-finals.

=== International goals ===
Scores and results list Cuba's goal tally first.

No.	Date	Venue	Opponent	Score	Result	Competition
1.	25 March 2015	Estadio Cibao, Santiago, Dominican Republic	Dominican Republic	3–0	3–0	Friendly
2.	15 July 2015	Bank of America Stadium, Charlotte, United States	Guatemala	1–0	1–0	2015 CONCACAF Gold Cup
3.	10 November 2019	Dennis Martínez National Stadium, Managua, Nicaragua	Nicaragua	1–0	1–0	Friendly
4.	2 June 2021	Estadio Doroteo Guamuch Flores, Guatemala City, Guatemala	British Virgin Islands	2–0	5–0	2022 FIFA World Cup qualification
5.	8 June 2021	Kirani James Athletic Stadium, St. George's, Grenada	Saint Vincent and the Grenadines	1–0	1–0	2022 FIFA World Cup qualification
6.	10 November 2021	Estadio Nacional, Managua, Nicaragua	Nicaragua	1–0	3–0	Friendly
7.	2 June 2022	Stade René Serge Nabajoth, Les Abymes, Guadeloupe	Guadeloupe	1–1	1–2	2022–23 CONCACAF Nations League B
8.	23 March 2023	Wildey Turf, Wildey, Barbados	Barbados	1–0	1–0	2022–23 CONCACAF Nations League B
9.	4 July 2023	Shell Energy Stadium, Houston, United States	Canada	2–4	2–4	2023 CONCACAF Gold Cup
10.	26 March 2024	Estadio Nacional, Managua, Nicaragua	Nicaragua	1–0	1–0	Friendly
11.	6 June 2024	Estadio Nacional Chelato Uclés, Tegucigalpa, Honduras	Honduras	1–0	1–3	2026 FIFA World Cup qualification
