= Armando Coroneaux =

Cuban footballer

Personal information
- Full name: Armando Coroneaux Isidoro
- Date of birth: 2 July 1985 (age 41)
- Place of birth: Nuevitas, Cuba
- Position: Forward

Senior career*
| Years | Team | Apps | (Gls) |
| 2003–2022 | Camagüey | | (112) |

International career^{‡}
| 2008–2015 | Cuba | 22 | (4) |
- * Club domestic league appearances and goals ‡ National team caps and goals as of 1 January 2018

Armando Coroneaux Isidoro (born 2 July 1985) is a former Cuban international footballer who played for the Cuba national football team and FC Camagüey his entire career.

== CLub career ==
Coroneaux has played his entire career for Camagüey and scored 100 league goals for the club.

== International career ==
He made his international debut for Cuba in a February 2008 friendly match against Guyana and has earned a total of 22 caps, scoring 4 goals. He represented his country in 1 FIFA World Cup qualifying matches. He scored a brace against Panama in only his fourth international game.

He was called up to the Cuba team for the 2015 CONCACAF Gold Cup. He played in Cuba's opening game against Mexico, a 6–0 loss.

=== International goals ===
Scores and results list Cuba's goal tally first.

| Number | Date | Location | Opponent | Score | Competition |
|---|---|---|---|---|---|
| 1 | 26 October 2010 | Estadio Rommel Fernández, Panama City, Panama | Panama | 2-0 | Friendly match |
| 2 | 26 October 2010 | Estadio Rommel Fernández, Panama City, Panama | Panama | 3-0 | Friendly match |
| 3 | 10 November 2010 | Recreation Ground, St. John's, Antigua and Barbuda | Dominica | 1-0 | 2010 Caribbean Cup qualification |
| 4 | 12 November 2010 | Recreation Ground, St. John's, Antigua and Barbuda | Suriname | 1-1 | 2010 Caribbean Cup qualification |

== Personal life ==
Coroneaux was born in Nuevitas, one of 6 children of Armando Coroneaux Coroneaux and Anairi Isidoro Matos.
