= Jorge Luis Clavelo =

Cuban footballer (born 1982)

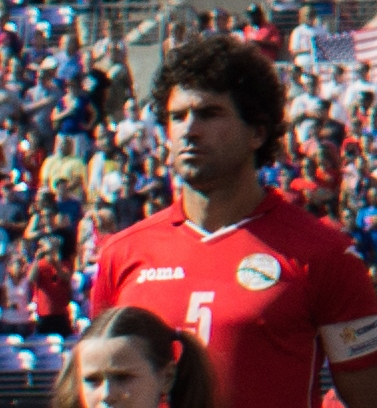
- Clavelo with Cuba in 2015

Personal information
- Full name: Jorge Luis Clavelo Tejeda
- Date of birth: 8 August 1982 (age 44)
- Place of birth: Santa Clara, Cuba
- Height: 1.86 m (6 ft 1 in)
- Position: Defender

Team information
- Current team: Bauger
- Number: 20

Senior career*
Years	Team	Apps	(Gls)
2003–2015	Villa Clara		
2016–	Bauger	1	(0)

International career^{‡}
2006–2016	Cuba	56	(2)
- * Club domestic league appearances and goals as of 9 April 2016 ‡ National team caps and goals as of 8 January 2016

Jorge Luis Clavelo Tejeda (born 8 August 1982) is a Cuban footballer who plays as a defender for Bauger FC in the Liga Dominicana de Fútbol.

== Club career ==
After spending the majority of his career at hometown club Villa Clara, he made his debut for Dominican Republic side Bauger on 9 April 2016 after solving his immigration situation.

== International career ==
He made his international debut for Cuba in a September 2006 CONCACAF Gold Cup qualification match against Turks & Caicos and has earned a total of 56 caps, scoring 2 goals. He also captained the team and represented his country in 12 FIFA World Cup qualifying matches. He played at 4 CONCACAF Gold Cup final tournaments.

His final international was a January 2016 friendly match against Panama.

=== International goals ===
Scores and results list Cuba's goal tally first.

Number	Date	Location	Opponent	Score	Competition
1	23 October 2008	Estadio Pedro Marrero, Havana, Cuba	Netherlands Antilles	6-1	2008 Caribbean Cup qualification
2	25 October 2008	Estadio Pedro Marrero, Havana, Cuba	Barbados	1-1	2008 Caribbean Cup qualification

== Achievements ==
Cuba

- Caribbean Cup winner: 2012

FC Villa Clara

- Cuban League (5): 2002–03, 2004–05, 2010–11, 2011–12 and 2013.
