= Yasmany López =

Cuban footballer (born 1987)

Personal information
- Full name: Yasmany López Escalante
- Date of birth: 11 October 1987 (age 39)
- Place of birth: Morón, Cuba
- Position: Defender

Senior career*
Years	Team	Apps	(Gls)
2012–2015	Villa Clara		
2015–2019	Ciego de Ávila		

International career
- Cuba U20
2013–2019	Cuba	28	(1)
- * Club domestic league appearances and goals

Yasmany López Escalante (born 11 October 1987) is a former Cuban footballer who played as a defender. He defected to the United States after Cuba's opening match at the 2019 CONCACAF Gold Cup.

== International career ==
He made his international debut for Cuba in a July 2013 CONCACAF Gold Cup match against Belize and has, as of January 2018, earned a total of 18 caps, scoring 1 goal. He represented his country in 14 FIFA World Cup qualification matches and played at two CONCACAF Gold Cup final tournaments.

After Cuba's opening loss to Mexico in the 2019 CONCACAF Gold Cup group stage, López ran away from the Cuban team's hotel and defected to the United States.

=== International goals ===
Scores and results list Cuba's goal tally first.

Goal	Date	Venue	Opponent	Score	Result	Competition
1.	13 November 2014	Montego Bay Sports Complex, Montego Bay, Jamaica	Curaçao	2–1	3–2	2014 Caribbean Cup
