= Raúl González (football manager, born 1968) =

Personal information
- Full name: Raúl Valentín González Triana
- Date of birth: 14 February 1968 (age 58)
- Place of birth: Cuba

Managerial career
- Years: Team
- 2001: Ciego de Ávila
- 2006–2007: Cuba
- 2008–2012: Cuba U23
- 2011–2012: Cuba
- 2012–2014: Cuba U20
- 2015–2016: Cuba

Raúl Valentín González Triana (born 14 February 1968) is the former head coach of the Cuba national football team.

== Career ==
=== Cuba national team ===
González was appointed as head coach of the Cuba national football team in 2006. He coached Cuba at the 2007 Caribbean Cup where they finished in third place qualifying for the 2007 CONCACAF Gold Cup. He departed the position soon after.

He was re-appointed in October 2008, competing in the 2008 Caribbean Cup finishing in fourth place overall qualifying for the 2009 CONCACAF Gold Cup but Cuba withdrew from the Gold Cup competition.

In 2010 Caribbean Cup, he led Cuba to a third-place finish qualifying for the 2011 CONCACAF Gold Cup. He departed the position in November 2012.

He was re-appointed in January 2015.

=== Cuba U23 ===
González was appointed as the head coach of the Cuba U23 team in November 2011 to help Cuba in their quest to qualify for the 2012 Summer Olympics, things began well as they finished in first place of Group C in the first round, and finished first place in second round qualifying for the 2012 CONCACAF Men's Olympic Qualifying Tournament. Cuba exited at the group stage finishing fourth in Group A behind El Salvador, Canada and USA.

He led the Cuban team at the 2014 Central American and Caribbean Games but was suspended for five games by CONCACAF due to racist behaviour.

=== Cuba U20 ===
Appointed in January 2013, González was tasked with preparing the team for the 2013 CONCACAF U-20 Championship. The team finished fourth overall in the competition qualifying for the 2013 FIFA U-20 World Cup, for the first time.

The Cuba national under-20 football team exited the FIFA U-20 World Cup in the group stage losing all three of their games against Portugal, Nigeria and South Korea.
