= Diosvelis Guerra =

Cuban footballer

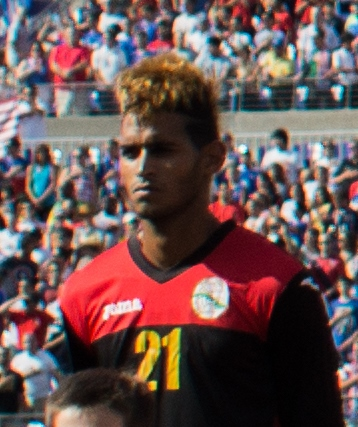

Personal information
- Full name: Diosvelis Alejandro Guerra Santiesteban
- Date of birth: 21 May 1989 (age 37)
- Place of birth: San Antonio de los Baños, Cuba
- Height: 1.92 m (6 ft 3 1/2 in)
- Position: Goalkeeper

Team information
- Current team: Cienfuegos

Senior career*
| Years | Team | Apps | (Gls) |
| 2009–2010 | Granma | | |
| 2010–2011 | La Habana | | |
| 2011–2013 | Artemisa | | |
| 2013–2014 | Pinar del Rio | | |
| 2015 | Ciego de Ávila | | |
| 2016 | Cienfuegos | 11 | (0) |
| 2017 | Artemisa | 11 | (0) |
| 2017– | Cienfuegos | 7 | (0) |

International career^{‡}
| 2014– | Cuba | 17 | (0) |
- * Club domestic league appearances and goals ‡ National team caps and goals as of 29 March 2016

Diosvelis Alejandro Guerra Santiesteban (born 21 May 1989) is a Cuban international footballer who plays for Cienfuegos and the Cuba national football team.

== Club career ==
Uncommon in Cuba, Guerra played for 6 different Cuban provincial teams, starting his senior career with Granma.

== International career ==
He made his international debut for Cuba in an August 2014 friendly match against Panama and has, as of January 2018, earned a total of 17 caps, scoring no goals. He represented his country in 1 FIFA World Cup qualification match and was called up to the Cuba team for the 2015 CONCACAF Gold Cup. He played in Cuba's opening game against Mexico, a 6–0 loss. And reached the quarter finals but were eliminated by United States 6–0.
