= Alberto Gómez (Cuban footballer) =

Cuban footballer (born 1988)

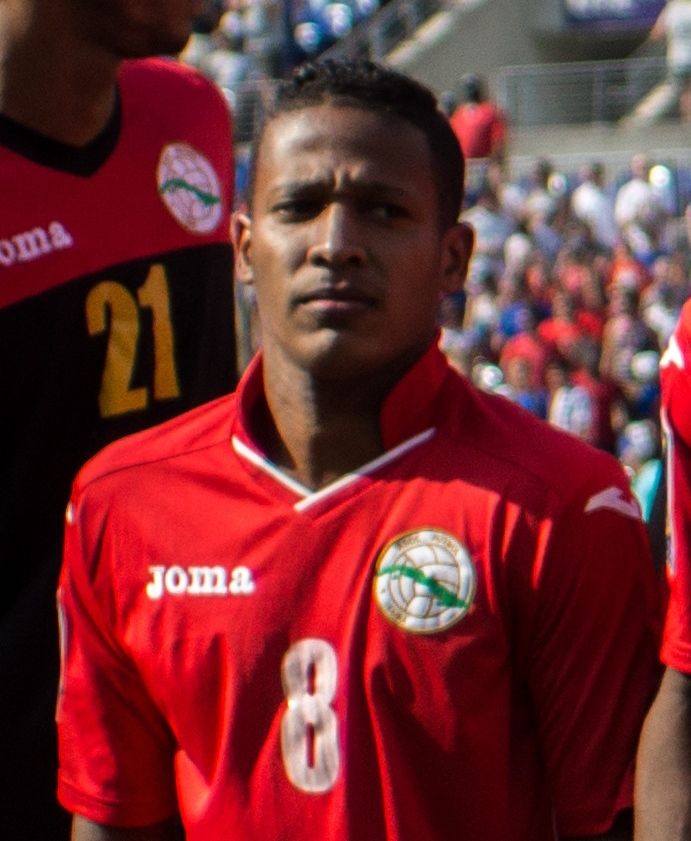
- Gómez in 2015

Personal information
- Full name: Alberto Gómez Carbonell
- Date of birth: 12 February 1988 (age 38)
- Place of birth: Guantánamo, Cuba
- Height: 1.63 m (5 ft 4 in)
- Position: Midfielder

Team information
- Current team: Atlético Vega Real
- Number: 10

Senior career*
Years	Team	Apps	(Gls)
2010–2017	Guantánamo		
2017–	Atlético Vega Real		

International career^{‡}
2011–	Cuba	44	(2)
- * Club domestic league appearances and goals ‡ National team caps and goals as of 1 January 2018

Alberto Gómez Carbonell (born 12 February 1988) is a Cuban footballer who plays for Dominican club Atlético Vega Real as a midfielder.

== Club career ==
Nicknamed Beto, Gómez played for hometown team Guantánamo, before signing professional terms with Dominican club Atlético Vega Real alongside compatriot Roberto Peraza.

== International career ==
He made his international debut for Cuba in a May 2011 friendly match against Nicaragua and has, as of January 2018, earned a total of 44 caps, scoring 2 goals. He represented his country in 10 FIFA World Cup qualifying matches and played at the 2011, 2013 and 2015 editions of the CONCACAF Gold Cup.

=== International goals ===
Scores and results list Cuba's goal tally first.

Number	Date	Location	Opponent	Score	Result	Competition
1.	16 October 2012	Estadio Pedro Marrero, Havana, Cuba	Panama	1–0	1–1	2014 FIFA World Cup qualification
2.	22 March 2016	Estadio Pedro Marrero, Havana, Cuba	Bermuda	1–0	2–1	2017 Caribbean Cup qualification
