= Félix Guerra =

Cuban footballer

Personal information
- Full name: Félix Reynier Guerra Rondón
- Date of birth: 14 January 1989 (age 37)
- Place of birth: Media Luna, Cuba
- Height: 1.75 m (5 ft 9 in)
- Position: Midfielder

Senior career*
Years	Team	Apps	(Gls)
2009–2013	Granma		
2014	Camagüey		
2015–	Granma		

International career
2012–2015	Cuba	11	(0)
- * Club domestic league appearances and goals

Félix Reynier Guerra Rondón (born 14 January 1989), is a Cuban international footballer that plays for the Cuba national football team.

== Club career ==
Guerra played for his local provincial outfit Granma, but joined Camagüey for the 2014 season.

== International career ==
He made his international debut for Cuba in a February 2012 friendly match against Jamaica and has, as of January 2018, earned a total of 11 caps, scoring no goals. He represented his country in 1 FIFA World Cup qualification match and was called up to the Cuba team for the 2015 CONCACAF Gold Cup. He played in Cuba's opening game against Mexico, a 6–0 loss.
