= Yaisnier Nápoles =

Cuban footballer

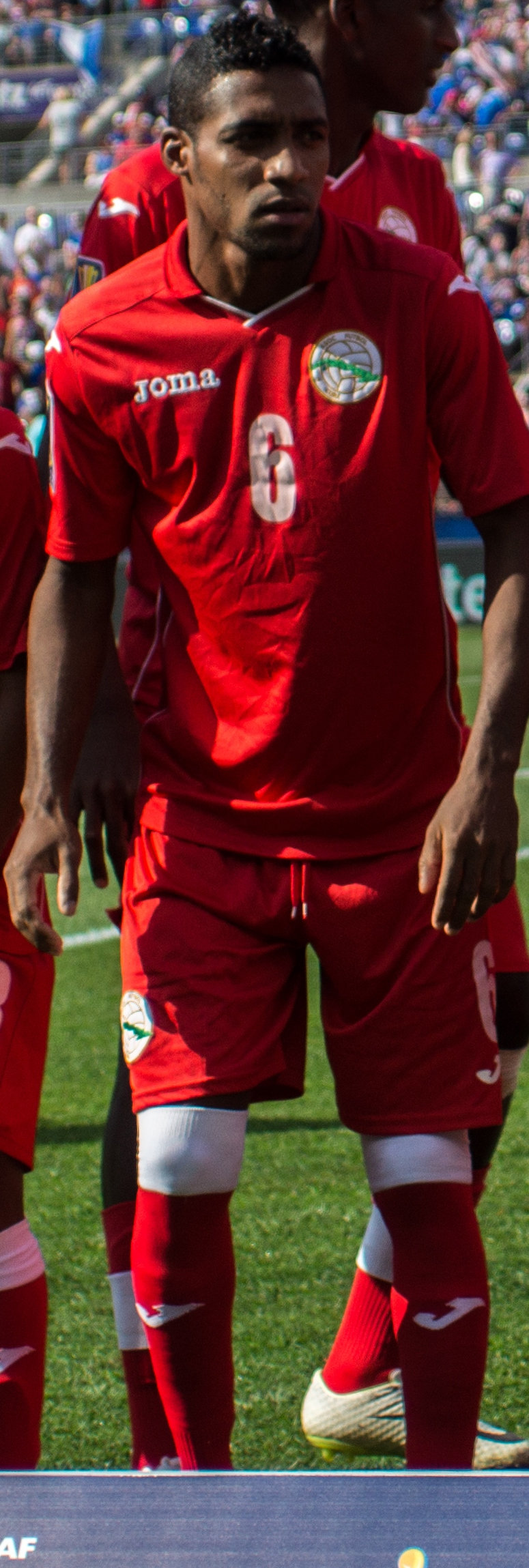

Personal information
- Full name: Yaisnier Nápoles Espinosa
- Date of birth: 20 October 1987 (age 39)
- Place of birth: Cuba
- Position: Defender

Team information
- Current team: Camagüey

Senior career*
Years	Team	Apps	(Gls)
- Camagüey

International career^{‡}
2015–2018	Cuba	13	(0)
- * Club domestic league appearances and goals ‡ National team caps and goals as of 1 April 2018

Yaisnier Nápoles Espinosa (born 20 October 1987), is a Cuban international footballer that plays for the Cuba national football team.

== Club career ==
Nápoles plays for his provincial team Camagüey.

== International career ==
He was called up to and made his international debut for Cuba's national team at the 2015 CONCACAF Gold Cup. He played in Cuba's opening game against Mexico, a 6–0 loss. Nápoles was also called up for the Copa Centenario qualifier against Panama. He has, as of April 2018, earned a total of 13 caps, scoring no goals.
