= Iván Sopegno =

Argentine footballer and manager

Personal information
- Full name: Iván Franco Sopegno
- Date of birth: 25 September 1963 (age 63)
- Place of birth: Rosario, Argentina
- Position: Goalkeeper

Senior career*
Years	Team	Apps	(Gls)
1983–1988	Rosario Central		
1989	Cienciano		
1990	Deportivo Municipal		
1991–1995	Municipal		
1995–1996	Galcasa		
1996–1997	Izabal JC		
1998	Argentino de Rosario		

Managerial career
- 2013–2014: Comunicaciones
- 2014–2015: Guatemala
- 2016–2017: Comunicaciones
- 2020: Cremas B
- 2024: Comunicaciones
- 2024: Guastatoya
- 2025: Comunicaciones
- * Club domestic league appearances and goals

Iván Franco Sopegno (born 25 September 1963) is an Argentine professional football manager and former player who was mos recently the head coach of Liga Nos Une club Comunicaciones.

== Playing career ==
Sopegno played for a number of clubs in Guatemala including C.S.D. Municipal, Galcasa and Izabal JC.

He also played in Peru for Cienciano de Cuzco and Municipal de Lima.

He started and ended his football in his homeland of Argentina for Rosario Central and Argentinos Juniors respectively.

== Managerial career ==
He has spent the majority of his career coaching clubs in Central America, where he has won multiple league titles, most notably in Guatemala with CSD Comunicaciones (5 titles). His five championships in Guatemala are the third most by any coach behind Rubén Amorín's eight and Horacio Cordero's six.

On 21 May 2014 he was named by the Federación Nacional de Fútbol de Guatemala as the new coach of the Guatemala national team.

In December 2023 it was announced that Sopegno had been hired as manager of Comunicaciones.

On 1 October 2025, after a string of poor results under Roberto Hernández, Comunicaciones announced Sopegno as the new head coach for the club.
