= 2019 CONCACAF Gold Cup squads =

National team squads list

The sixteen national teams involved in the 2019 CONCACAF Gold Cup were required to register a squad of 23 players; only players in these squads were eligible to take part in the tournament. CONCACAF published all provisional lists on 20 May. The final list of 23 players per national team was submitted to CONCACAF by June 2019. Three players per national team had to be goalkeepers.

The statistics in the tables below represent player profiles as of the beginning of the tournament. See individual player articles for current statistics. The club listed is the club for which the player last played a competitive match prior to the tournament. The nationality for each club reflects the national association (not the league) to which the club is affiliated.

== Group A ==
=== Mexico ===
Head coach: (Argentina) Gerardo Martino

The 29-man provisional squad was announced on 14 May 2019. On 26 May and 27 May, defender Miguel Layún and forward Hirving Lozano were ruled out for medical reasons, therefore, provisional squad was reduced to 27 players. The 23-man final squad was announced on 5 June 2019. On 14 June 2019, Uriel Antuna replaced the injured Jorge Sánchez.

No.	Pos.	Player	Date of birth (age)	Caps	Goals	Club
1	GK	Jonathan Orozco	12 May 1986 (aged 33)	7	0	(Mexican Football Federation) Santos Laguna
2	DF	Néstor Araujo	21 August 1991 (aged 27)	31	3	(Royal Spanish Football Federation) Celta Vigo
3	DF	Carlos Salcedo	29 September 1993 (aged 25)	26	0	(Mexican Football Federation) UANL
4	MF	Edson Álvarez	24 October 1997 (aged 21)	23	1	(Mexican Football Federation) América
5	DF	Diego Reyes	19 September 1992 (aged 26)	59	1	(Royal Spanish Football Federation) Leganés
6	MF	Jonathan dos Santos	26 April 1990 (aged 29)	40	1	(United States Soccer Federation) LA Galaxy
7	MF	Orbelín Pineda	24 March 1996 (aged 23)	16	1	(Mexican Football Federation) Cruz Azul
8	MF	Carlos Rodríguez	3 January 1997 (aged 22)	2	0	(Mexican Football Federation) Monterrey
9	FW	Raúl Jiménez	5 May 1991 (aged 28)	71	17	(The Football Association) Wolverhampton Wanderers
10	MF	Luis Montes	15 May 1986 (aged 33)	21	4	(Mexican Football Federation) León
11	FW	Roberto Alvarado	7 September 1998 (aged 20)	7	1	(Mexican Football Federation) Cruz Azul
12	GK	Hugo González	1 August 1990 (aged 28)	2	0	(Mexican Football Federation) Necaxa
13	GK	Guillermo Ochoa	13 July 1985 (aged 33)	101	0	(Royal Belgian Football Association) Standard Liège
14	FW	Alexis Vega	25 November 1997 (aged 21)	2	0	(Mexican Football Federation) Guadalajara
15	DF	Héctor Moreno	17 January 1988 (aged 31)	97	4	(Royal Spanish Football Federation) Real Sociedad
16	MF	Érick Gutiérrez	17 June 1995 (aged 23)	16	0	(Royal Dutch Football Association) PSV Eindhoven
17	DF	César Montes	24 February 1997 (aged 22)	6	0	(Mexican Football Federation) Monterrey
18	MF	Andrés Guardado (captain)	28 September 1986 (aged 32)	154	26	(Royal Spanish Football Federation) Real Betis
19	DF	Fernando Navarro	18 April 1989 (aged 30)	1	0	(Mexican Football Federation) León
20	FW	Rodolfo Pizarro	15 February 1994 (aged 25)	17	4	(Mexican Football Federation) Monterrey
21	DF	Luis Rodríguez	21 January 1991 (aged 28)	11	0	(Mexican Football Federation) UANL
22	MF	Uriel Antuna	21 August 1997 (aged 21)	2	0	(United States Soccer Federation) LA Galaxy
23	DF	Jesús Gallardo	14 August 1994 (aged 24)	34	0	(Mexican Football Federation) Monterrey

=== Canada ===
Head coach: (England) John Herdman

The 40-man provisional squad was announced on 20 May 2019. The 23-man final squad was announced on 30 May 2019.

No.	Pos.	Player	Date of birth (age)	Caps	Goals	Club
1	GK	Jayson Leutwiler	25 April 1989 (aged 30)	3	0	(The Football Association) Blackburn Rovers
2	DF	Zachary Brault-Guillard	30 December 1998 (aged 20)	3	0	(Canadian Soccer Association) Montreal Impact
3	DF	Ashtone Morgan	9 February 1991 (aged 28)	14	0	(Canadian Soccer Association) Toronto FC
4	DF	Derek Cornelius	25 November 1997 (aged 21)	4	0	(Canadian Soccer Association) Vancouver Whitecaps FC
5	MF	Will Johnson	21 January 1987 (aged 32)	43	4	(United States Soccer Federation) Orlando City SC
6	MF	Samuel Piette	12 November 1994 (aged 24)	41	0	(Canadian Soccer Association) Montreal Impact
7	MF	Russell Teibert	22 December 1992 (aged 26)	23	1	(Canadian Soccer Association) Vancouver Whitecaps FC
8	MF	Scott Arfield (co-captain)	1 November 1988 (aged 30)	13	1	(Scottish Football Association) Rangers
9	FW	Cyle Larin	17 April 1995 (aged 24)	28	8	(Turkish Football Federation) Beşiktaş
10	MF	Junior Hoilett	5 June 1990 (aged 29)	21	4	(Football Association of Wales) Cardiff City
11	FW	Liam Millar	27 September 1999 (aged 19)	4	0	(Scottish Football Association) Kilmarnock
12	FW	Alphonso Davies	2 November 2000 (aged 18)	9	3	(German Football Association) Bayern Munich
13	MF	Atiba Hutchinson (co-captain)	8 February 1983 (aged 36)	81	7	(Turkish Football Federation) Beşiktaş
14	MF	Mark-Anthony Kaye	2 December 1994 (aged 24)	7	0	(United States Soccer Federation) Los Angeles FC
15	DF	Doneil Henry	20 April 1993 (aged 26)	25	0	(Canadian Soccer Association) Vancouver Whitecaps FC
16	MF	Noble Okello	20 July 2000 (aged 18)	0	0	(Canadian Soccer Association) Toronto FC
17	DF	Kamal Miller	16 June 1997 (aged 21)	0	0	(United States Soccer Federation) Orlando City SC
18	GK	Milan Borjan	23 October 1987 (aged 31)	41	0	(Football Association of Serbia) Red Star Belgrade
19	FW	Lucas Cavallini	28 December 1992 (aged 26)	11	5	(Mexican Football Federation) Puebla
20	FW	Jonathan David	14 January 2000 (aged 19)	4	4	(Royal Belgian Football Association) Gent
21	MF	Jonathan Osorio	12 June 1992 (aged 27)	23	3	(Canadian Soccer Association) Toronto FC
22	GK	Maxime Crépeau	11 April 1994 (aged 25)	2	0	(Canadian Soccer Association) Vancouver Whitecaps FC
23	DF	Marcus Godinho	28 June 1997 (aged 21)	1	0	(Scottish Football Association) Heart of Midlothian

=== Martinique ===
Head coach: Mario Bocaly

The preliminary squad was announced on 28 May 2019, Gregory Eneleda replaced to Wesley Jobello. The final squad was announced on 7 June 2019.

No.	Pos.	Player	Date of birth (age)	Caps	Goals	Club
1	GK	Loïc Chauvet	30 April 1988 (aged 31)	15	0	(Ligue de football de la Martinique) Golden Lion
2	DF	Yordan Thimon	10 September 1996 (aged 22)	5	0	(Ligue de football de la Martinique) Club Franciscain
3	MF	Joris Marveaux	15 August 1982 (aged 36)	0	0	(French Football Federation) Gazélec Ajaccio
4	DF	Rodrigue César	14 April 1988 (aged 31)	5	0	(Ligue de football de la Martinique) Club Colonial
5	MF	Karl Vitulin	15 January 1991 (aged 28)	43	2	(Ligue de football de la Martinique) Samaritaine
6	DF	Jean-Sylvain Babin	14 October 1986 (aged 32)	10	1	(Royal Spanish Football Federation) Sporting Gijón
7	FW	Grégory Pastel	18 September 1990 (aged 28)	15	3	(Ligue de football de la Martinique) Rivière-Pilote
8	DF	Jordy Delem	18 March 1993 (aged 26)	39	5	(United States Soccer Federation) Seattle Sounders FC
9	FW	Kévin Fortuné	6 August 1989 (aged 29)	2	0	(French Football Federation) Troyes
10	FW	Mickaël Biron	26 August 1997 (aged 21)	5	4	(Ligue de football de la Martinique) Golden Lion
11	MF	Gregory Eneleda	1 December 1989 (aged 29)	-	-	(Ligue de football de la Martinique) Golden Star
12	FW	Johnny Marajo	12 October 1993 (aged 25)	11	0	(Ligue de football de la Martinique) Club Franciscain
13	FW	Christophe Jougon	10 July 1995 (aged 23)	20	1	(Ligue de football de la Martinique) Club Franciscain
14	DF	Yann Thimon	1 January 1990 (aged 29)	10	1	(Ligue de football de la Martinique) Club Franciscain
15	DF	Audrick Linord	17 April 1987 (aged 32)	14	0	(Ligue de football de la Martinique) Robert
16	GK	Arnaud Huygues des Étages	30 December 1985 (aged 33)	0	0	(Ligue de football de la Martinique) Aiglon
17	FW	Kévin Parsemain	13 February 1988 (aged 31)	48	32	(Ligue de football de la Martinique) Golden Lion
18	DF	Samuel Camille	2 February 1986 (aged 33)	0	0	(Royal Spanish Football Federation) Tenerife
19	MF	Daniel Hérelle	17 October 1988 (aged 30)	68	3	(Ligue de football de la Martinique) Golden Lion
20	MF	Stéphane Abaul	23 November 1991 (aged 27)	46	7	(Ligue de football de la Martinique) Club Franciscain
21	DF	Sébastien Crétinoir (captain)	12 February 1986 (aged 33)	55	3	(Ligue de football de la Martinique) Golden Lion
22	MF	Romario Barthéléry	24 June 1994 (aged 24)	2	0	(Ligue de football de la Martinique) Golden Lion
23	GK	Stéphane Michalet	16 March 1989 (aged 30)	0	0	(Ligue de football de la Martinique) Robert

=== Cuba ===
Head coach: Raúl Mederos

The final squad was announced on 7 June 2019. Yordan Santa Cruz did not travel but remained in the official list. Yasmany López defected following Cuba's opening match. Daniel Luis Sáez, Reynaldo Pérez and Luismel Morris defected after second game.

No.	Pos.	Player	Date of birth (age)	Caps	Goals	Club
1	GK	Sandy Sánchez	24 May 1994 (aged 25)	13	1	(Dominican Football Federation) Jarabacoa
2	MF	Andy Baquero	17 August 1994 (aged 24)	25	5	(Dominican Football Federation) Delfines del Este
3	DF	Erick Rizo	7 March 1991 (aged 28)	13	1	(Football Association of Cuba) Santiago de Cuba
4	DF	Yasmany López	11 October 1987 (aged 31)	28	1	(Football Association of Cuba) Ciego de Ávila
5	DF	Dariel Morejón	21 December 1998 (aged 20)	6	0	(Football Association of Cuba) Villa Clara
6	DF	Yosel Piedra	27 March 1994 (aged 25)	17	0	(National Football Federation of Guatemala) Universidad
7	MF	Rolando Abreu	15 May 1992 (aged 27)	8	0	(Football Association of Cuba) Santiago de Cuba
8	MF	Alejandro Portal	21 October 1995 (aged 23)	2	0	(Football Association of Cuba) Mayabeque
9	FW	Maikel Reyes	4 March 1993 (aged 26)	14	2	(Football Association of Cuba) Pinar del Río
10	MF	Arichel Hernández	20 September 1993 (aged 25)	16	3	(Panamanian Football Federation) Independiente
11	FW	Yordan Santa Cruz (captain)	7 October 1993 (aged 25)	16	8	(Dominican Football Federation) Jarabacoa
12	GK	Elier Pozo	28 January 1995 (aged 24)	3	0	(Football Association of Cuba) Pinar del Río
13	MF	Aníbal Álvarez	25 May 1995 (aged 24)	2	1	(Football Association of Cuba) Ciego de Ávila
14	DF	Karel Espino	27 October 2001 (aged 17)	1	0	(Football Association of Cuba) Artemisa
15	DF	Lionis Martínez	3 February 1989 (aged 30)	0	0	(Football Association of Cuba) Santiago de Cuba
16	MF	Daniel Luis Sáez	11 May 1994 (aged 25)	17	1	(Dominican Football Federation) Delfines del Este
17	MF	Jean Carlos Rodríguez	27 May 1999 (aged 20)	0	0	(Football Association of Cuba) Pinar del Río
18	MF	Reynaldo Pérez	22 January 1994 (aged 25)	0	0	(Dominican Football Federation) Delfines del Este
19	MF	Jorge Kindelán	12 April 1986 (aged 33)	8	0	(Football Association of Cuba) Santiago de Cuba
20	MF	Luismel Morris	14 December 1997 (aged 21)	10	4	(Football Association of Cuba) Camagüey
21	GK	Nelson Johnston	25 February 1990 (aged 29)	5	0	(Football Association of Cuba) Santiago de Cuba
22	MF	Roberney Caballero	2 November 1995 (aged 23)	10	3	(Football Association of Cuba) Villa Clara
23	FW	Luis Paradela	21 January 1997 (aged 22)	6	5	(National Football Federation of Guatemala) Universidad

== Group B ==
=== Costa Rica ===
Head coach: (Uruguay) Gustavo Matosas

The 40-man provisional squad was announced on 20 May 2019. The 23-man final squad was announced on 5 June 2019. The squad was reduced to 22 players after Jimmy Marín left the team without permission in order to sign with Hapoel Be'er Sheva, but remained in the official list.

No.	Pos.	Player	Date of birth (age)	Caps	Goals	Club
1	GK	Bryan Segura	14 January 1997 (aged 22)	0	0	(Costa Rican Football Federation) Pérez Zeledón
2	MF	Randall Leal	14 January 1997 (aged 22)	8	0	(Costa Rican Football Federation) Saprissa
3	DF	Giancarlo González	8 February 1988 (aged 31)	76	2	(United States Soccer Federation) LA Galaxy
4	DF	Keysher Fuller	12 July 1994 (aged 24)	2	1	(Costa Rican Football Federation) Herediano
5	MF	Celso Borges	27 May 1988 (aged 31)	121	21	(Turkish Football Federation) Göztepe
6	DF	Óscar Duarte	3 June 1989 (aged 30)	44	2	(Royal Spanish Football Federation) Espanyol
7	MF	Christian Bolaños	17 May 1984 (aged 35)	85	7	(Costa Rican Football Federation) Saprissa
8	DF	Bryan Oviedo	18 February 1990 (aged 29)	51	1	(The Football Association) Sunderland
9	FW	Álvaro Saborío	25 March 1982 (aged 37)	109	35	(Costa Rican Football Federation) San Carlos
10	MF	Bryan Ruiz (captain)	18 August 1985 (aged 33)	120	25	(Brazilian Football Confederation) Santos
11	FW	Mayron George	23 October 1993 (aged 25)	9	0	(Danish Football Association) Midtjylland
12	FW	Joel Campbell	26 June 1992 (aged 26)	86	17	(Mexican Football Federation) León
13	MF	Allan Cruz	24 February 1996 (aged 23)	10	1	(United States Soccer Federation) FC Cincinnati
14	FW	Jonathan McDonald	28 October 1987 (aged 31)	13	1	(Qatar Football Association) Al-Ahli
15	DF	Francisco Calvo	8 July 1992 (aged 26)	45	4	(United States Soccer Federation) Chicago Fire
16	DF	Cristian Gamboa	24 October 1989 (aged 29)	74	3	(Scottish Football Association) Celtic
17	MF	Yeltsin Tejeda	17 March 1992 (aged 27)	50	0	(Costa Rican Football Federation) Herediano
18	GK	Marco Madrigal	3 August 1985 (aged 33)	1	0	(Costa Rican Football Federation) San Carlos
19	DF	Kendall Waston	1 January 1988 (aged 31)	33	7	(United States Soccer Federation) FC Cincinnati
20	MF	Elías Aguilar	7 November 1991 (aged 27)	16	0	(Korea Football Association) Jeju United
21	MF	Jimmy Marín	8 October 1997 (age 29)	5	0	(Costa Rican Football Federation) Herediano
22	DF	Rónald Matarrita	9 July 1994 (aged 24)	30	3	(United States Soccer Federation) New York City FC
23	GK	Leonel Moreira	2 April 1990 (aged 29)	11	0	(Mexican Football Federation) Pachuca

=== Haiti ===
Head coach: (Martinique) Marc Collat

The 40-man provisional squad was announced on 16 May 2019. The 23-man final squad was announced on 23 May 2019.

No.	Pos.	Player	Date of birth (age)	Caps	Goals	Club
1	GK	Johny Placide (captain)	29 January 1988 (aged 31)	36	0	(Bulgarian Football Union) Tsarsko Selo
2	DF	Carlens Arcus	28 June 1996 (aged 22)	8	1	(French Football Federation) Auxerre
3	DF	Mechack Jérôme	21 April 1990 (aged 29)	62	2	(United States Soccer Federation) El Paso Locomotive
4	DF	Ricardo Adé	21 May 1990 (aged 29)	8	0	(Football Federation of Chile) Magallanes
5	DF	Djimy Alexis	8 October 1997 (aged 21)	1	0	(Haitian Football Federation) Capoise
6	DF	Jems Geffrard	26 August 1994 (aged 24)	3	0	(United States Soccer Federation) Fresno FC
7	FW	Hervé Bazile	18 March 1990 (aged 29)	0	0	(French Football Federation) Le Havre
8	MF	Zachary Herivaux	2 January 1996 (aged 23)	5	0	(United States Soccer Federation) New England Revolution
9	FW	Duckens Nazon	17 April 1994 (aged 25)	26	16	(Royal Belgian Football Association) Sint-Truiden
10	DF	Wilde-Donald Guerrier	31 March 1989 (aged 30)	43	9	(Association of Football Federations of Azerbaijan) Qarabağ
11	FW	Derrick Etienne	25 November 1996 (aged 22)	8	2	(United States Soccer Federation) New York Red Bulls
12	GK	Josué Duverger	27 April 2000 (aged 19)	1	0	(Portuguese Football Federation) Vitória de Setúbal
13	MF	Bicou Bissainthe	15 March 1999 (aged 20)	0	0	(United States Soccer Federation) North Texas SC
14	MF	Charles Hérold Jr.	23 July 1990 (aged 28)	20	3	(Dominican Football Federation) Cibao
15	FW	Mikaël Cantave	25 October 1996 (aged 22)	4	1	(Royal Spanish Football Federation) Tropezón
16	DF	Andrew Jean-Baptiste	June 16, 1992 (aged 26)	4	2	(Swedish Football Association) Umeå FC
17	MF	Dutherson Clerveaux	20 January 1999 (aged 20)	0	0	(Haitian Football Federation) Cavaly
18	FW	Jonel Désiré	12 February 1997 (aged 22)	8	1	(Football Federation of Armenia) Lori
19	MF	Steeven Saba	24 February 1993 (aged 26)	2	0	(Haitian Football Federation) Violette
20	FW	Frantzdy Pierrot	29 March 1995 (aged 24)	5	2	(Royal Belgian Football Association) Mouscron
21	MF	Bryan Alceus	1 February 1996 (aged 23)	6	0	(French Football Federation) C'Chartres
22	DF	Alex Junior Christian	5 December 1993 (aged 25)	18	1	(Football Federation of Armenia) Ararat-Armenia
23	GK	Isaac Rouaud Simon	12 February 1998 (aged 21)	0	0	(French Football Federation) Vannes

=== Nicaragua ===
Head coach: (Costa Rica) Henry Duarte

The 40-man provisional squad was announced on 20 May 2019. The 23-man final squad was announced on 3 June 2019. Marlon Lopez, Carlos Montenegro, Carlos Chavarria expelled from the team after first match.

No.	Pos.	Player	Date of birth (age)	Caps	Goals	Club
1	GK	Justo Lorente	27 February 1984 (aged 35)	26	0	(Nicaraguan Football Federation) Managua
2	DF	Josué Quijano	10 March 1991 (aged 28)	53	1	(Nicaraguan Football Federation) Real Estelí
3	DF	Manuel Rosas	14 October 1983 (aged 35)	39	2	(Nicaraguan Football Federation) Real Estelí
4	DF	René Huete	5 June 1995 (aged 24)	0	0	(Nicaraguan Football Federation) Walter Ferretti
5	DF	Carlos Montenegro	7 January 1991 (aged 28)	0	0	(Costa Rican Football Federation) Carmelita
6	DF	Luis Fernando Copete	12 February 1989 (aged 30)	28	3	(Bolivian Football Federation) Always Ready
7	FW	Carlos Chavarría	2 May 1994 (aged 25)	29	7	(Football Federation Islamic Republic of Iran) Padideh
8	MF	Marlon López	2 November 1992 (aged 26)	33	0	(Nicaraguan Football Federation) Real Estelí
9	MF	Daniel Cadena	9 February 1987 (aged 32)	27	3	(Royal Spanish Football Federation) Algaida
10	FW	Luis Galeano	15 October 1991 (aged 27)	24	4	(Nicaraguan Football Federation) Real Estelí
11	FW	Juan Barrera (captain)	2 May 1989 (aged 30)	48	17	(National Football Federation of Guatemala) Municipal
12	GK	Henry Maradiaga	5 February 1990 (aged 29)	2	0	(Nicaraguan Football Federation) Juventus Managua
13	MF	Junior Arteaga	9 December 1999 (aged 19)	0	0	(Nicaraguan Football Federation) Juventus Managua
14	MF	Kevin Serapio	9 April 1996 (aged 23)	2	0	(Nicaraguan Football Federation) Managua
15	FW	Byron Bonilla	30 August 1993 (aged 25)	3	0	(Costa Rican Football Federation) Grecia
16	MF	Armanto Gkoufas	2 February 1995 (aged 24)	2	1	(Hellenic Football Federation) Iródotos
17	MF	Renato Punyed	22 August 1995 (aged 23)	3	0	(Norwegian Football Federation) Nybergsund
18	MF	Jorge Betancur	19 August 1991 (aged 27)	3	0	(Nicaraguan Football Federation) Real Estelí
19	DF	Camphers Pérez	13 May 1998 (aged 21)	5	0	(Nicaraguan Football Federation) Managua
20	DF	Oscar López	27 February 1992 (aged 27)	14	0	(Nicaraguan Football Federation) Real Estelí
21	DF	Francisco Flores	2 April 1988 (aged 31)	2	0	(Costa Rican Football Federation) Santos de Guápiles
22	MF	Agenor Báez	18 December 1997 (aged 21)	1	0	(Nicaraguan Football Federation) Managua
23	GK	Bryan Rodríguez	23 September 1996 (aged 22)	1	0	(Costa Rican Football Federation) Carmelita

=== Bermuda ===
Head coach: Kyle Lightbourne

The final squad was announced on 31 May 2019.

No.	Pos.	Player	Date of birth (age)	Caps	Goals	Club
1	GK	Dale Eve	9 February 1995 (aged 24)	11	0	(Bermuda Football Association) Robin Hood
2	MF	Chikosi Basden	1 February 1995 (aged 24)	2	0	(The Football Association) Hatfield Town
3	DF	Calon Minors	11 July 1996 (aged 22)	5	0	(Italian Football Federation) Soccer Management Institute
4	DF	Roger Lee	1 July 1991 (aged 27)	21	0	(Estonian Football Association) Tallinna Kalev
5	DF	Oliver Harvey	28 August 1993 (aged 25)	0	0	(Bermuda Football Association) North Village Rams
6	DF	Jaylon Bather	31 December 1992 (aged 26)	18	1	(Bermuda Football Association) Robin Hood
7	MF	Lejuan Simmons	7 April 1993 (aged 26)	17	7	(Bermuda Football Association) Robin Hood
8	MF	Donte Brangman	26 June 1994 (aged 24)	9	0	(Bermuda Football Association) Southampton Rangers
9	FW	Jonte Smith	10 July 1994 (aged 24)	9	2	(The Football Association) Oxford United
10	MF	Zeiko Lewis	4 June 1994 (aged 25)	22	9	(United States Soccer Federation) Charleston Battery
11	MF	Willie Clemons	24 September 1994 (aged 24)	12	2	(Swedish Football Association) Bodens BK
12	GK	Jahquil Hill	15 January 1997 (aged 22)	7	0	(The Football Association) Hereford
13	MF	Osagi Bascome	17 April 1998 (aged 21)	10	1	(Bermuda Football Association) Robin Hood
14	MF	Cecoy Robinson	10 October 1987 (aged 31)	14	1	(Bermuda Football Association) PHC Zebras
15	MF	Milan Butterfield	24 January 1998 (aged 21)	3	0	(The Football Association) Kidderminster Harriers
16	DF	Dante Leverock (captain)	11 April 1992 (aged 27)	17	2	(Football Association of Ireland) Sligo Rovers
17	DF	Justin Donawa	27 June 1996 (aged 22)	12	3	(United States Soccer Federation) Columbus Crew
18	MF	Tre Ming	11 April 1994 (aged 25)	18	3	(Bermuda Football Association) PHC Zebras
19	MF	Reggie Lambe	4 February 1991 (aged 28)	33	9	(The Football Association) Cambridge United
20	MF	Liam Evans	1 May 1997 (aged 22)	5	1	(Bermuda Football Association) Robin Hood
21	FW	Nahki Wells	1 June 1990 (aged 29)	11	7	(The Football Association) Burnley
22	MF	Marco Warren	13 December 1993 (aged 25)	8	1	(Bermuda Football Association) PHC Zebras
23	GK	Quinaceo Hunt	21 January 2000 (aged 19)	1	0	(The Football Association) Wakefield

== Group C ==
=== Honduras ===
Head coach: (Uruguay) Fabián Coito

The 40-man provisional squad was announced on 20 May 2019. The 23-man final squad was announced on 6 June 2019. On 10 June, defender Andy Najar withdrew injured and was replaced by José Reyes.

No.	Pos.	Player	Date of birth (age)	Caps	Goals	Club
1	GK	Luis López	13 September 1993 (aged 25)	16	0	(National Autonomous Federation of Football of Honduras) Real España
2	DF	Félix Crisanto	9 September 1990 (aged 28)	10	0	(Mexican Football Federation) Lobos BUAP
3	DF	Maynor Figueroa (captain)	2 May 1983 (aged 36)	151	6	(United States Soccer Federation) Houston Dynamo
4	DF	Henry Figueroa	28 December 1992 (aged 26)	42	0	(Costa Rican Football Federation) Alajuelense
5	DF	Éver Alvarado	30 January 1992 (aged 27)	19	1	(National Autonomous Federation of Football of Honduras) Olimpia
6	MF	Bryan Acosta	24 November 1993 (aged 25)	44	3	(United States Soccer Federation) FC Dallas
7	DF	Emilio Izaguirre	10 May 1986 (aged 33)	102	3	(Scottish Football Association) Celtic
8	MF	José Reyes	5 November 1997 (aged 21)	0	0	(National Autonomous Federation of Football of Honduras) Olimpia
9	FW	Anthony Lozano	25 April 1993 (aged 26)	30	8	(Royal Spanish Football Federation) Girona
10	MF	Alexander López	6 May 1992 (aged 27)	23	2	(Costa Rican Football Federation) Alajuelense
11	FW	Rubilio Castillo	26 November 1991 (aged 27)	22	4	(Costa Rican Football Federation) Saprissa
12	FW	Romell Quioto	9 August 1991 (aged 27)	42	9	(United States Soccer Federation) Houston Dynamo
13	DF	Danilo Acosta	17 October 1997 (aged 21)	0	0	(United States Soccer Federation) Orlando City SC
14	MF	Michaell Chirinos	17 June 1995 (aged 23)	15	0	(Mexican Football Federation) Lobos BUAP
15	DF	Denil Maldonado	26 May 1998 (aged 21)	0	0	(National Autonomous Federation of Football of Honduras) Motagua
16	MF	Héctor Castellanos	28 December 1992 (aged 26)	0	0	(National Autonomous Federation of Football of Honduras) Motagua
17	FW	Alberth Elis	16 February 1996 (aged 23)	33	7	(United States Soccer Federation) Houston Dynamo
18	GK	Rafael Zúñiga	13 May 1990 (aged 29)	0	0	(National Autonomous Federation of Football of Honduras) Platense
19	MF	Luis Garrido	5 November 1990 (aged 28)	37	0	(Costa Rican Football Federation) Alajuelense
20	MF	Jorge Álvarez	28 January 1998 (aged 21)	2	0	(National Autonomous Federation of Football of Honduras) Olimpia
21	DF	Brayan Beckeles	28 November 1985 (aged 33)	62	1	(Mexican Football Federation) Necaxa
22	GK	Harold Fonseca	8 October 1993 (aged 25)	1	0	(National Autonomous Federation of Football of Honduras) Vida
23	FW	Roger Rojas	9 June 1990 (aged 29)	31	3	(Costa Rican Football Federation) Alajuelense

=== Jamaica ===
Head coach: Theodore Whitmore

The final squad was announced on 7 June 2019.

No.	Pos.	Player	Date of birth (age)	Caps	Goals	Club
1	GK	Andre Blake (captain)	21 November 1990 (aged 28)	32	0	(United States Soccer Federation) Philadelphia Union
2	DF	Jamoi Topey	13 January 2000 (aged 19)	1	0	(United States Soccer Federation) Bethlehem Steel
3	DF	Michael Hector	19 July 1992 (aged 26)	24	0	(The Football Association) Sheffield Wednesday
4	MF	Andre Lewis	12 August 1994 (aged 24)	1	0	(Jamaica Football Federation) Portmore United
5	DF	Alvas Powell	18 July 1994 (aged 24)	37	0	(United States Soccer Federation) FC Cincinnati
6	FW	Dever Orgill	8 March 1990 (aged 29)	10	0	(Turkish Football Federation) Ankaragücü
7	MF	Leon Bailey	9 August 1997 (aged 21)	0	0	(German Football Association) Bayer Leverkusen
8	FW	Maalique Foster	5 November 1996 (aged 22)	3	1	(United States Soccer Federation) Rio Grande Valley Toros
9	MF	Ricardo Morris	11 February 1992 (aged 27)	14	2	(Jamaica Football Federation) Portmore United
10	FW	Darren Mattocks	2 September 1990 (aged 28)	44	17	(United States Soccer Federation) FC Cincinnati
11	FW	Shamar Nicholson	16 March 1997 (aged 22)	5	0	(Football Association of Slovenia) Domžale
12	FW	Junior Flemmings	16 January 1996 (aged 23)	3	0	(United States Soccer Federation) Phoenix Rising
13	GK	Dwayne Miller	14 July 1987 (aged 31)	34	0	(Swedish Football Association) Syrianska
14	DF	Shaun Francis	2 October 1986 (aged 32)	16	3	(United States Soccer Federation) Louisville City
15	MF	Je-Vaughn Watson	22 October 1983 (aged 35)	78	4	(United States Soccer Federation) Oklahoma City Energy
16	MF	Peter-Lee Vassell	3 February 1998 (aged 21)	10	5	(United States Soccer Federation) Los Angeles FC
17	DF	Damion Lowe	5 May 1993 (aged 26)	19	1	(Norwegian Football Federation) Start
18	FW	Brian Brown	29 December 1992 (aged 26)	1	0	(United States Soccer Federation) Reno 1868
19	MF	Tyreek Magee	27 August 1999 (aged 19)	1	0	(Jamaica Football Federation) Harbour View
20	DF	Kemar Lawrence	17 September 1992 (aged 26)	46	3	(United States Soccer Federation) New York Red Bulls
21	DF	Kevon Lambert	22 March 1997 (aged 22)	10	0	(United States Soccer Federation) Phoenix Rising
22	MF	Devon Williams	8 April 1992 (aged 27)	5	0	(United States Soccer Federation) Louisville City
23	GK	Amal Knight	19 November 1993 (aged 25)	4	0	(Jamaica Football Federation) UWI

=== El Salvador ===
Head coach: (Mexico) Carlos de los Cobos

The 39-man provisional squad was announced on 20 May 2019. The 23-man final squad was announced on 28 May 2019.

No.	Pos.	Player	Date of birth (age)	Caps	Goals	Club
1	GK	Henry Hernández (captain)	4 January 1985 (aged 34)	28	0	(Salvadoran Football Federation) Chalatenango
2	DF	Xavier García	26 June 1990 (aged 28)	68	1	(Salvadoran Football Federation) FAS
3	DF	Roberto Domínguez	9 May 1997 (aged 22)	22	0	(Salvadoran Football Federation) FAS
4	DF	Iván Mancía	1 May 1989 (aged 30)	14	0	(Salvadoran Football Federation) Alianza
5	DF	Alexander Mendoza	4 June 1990 (aged 29)	37	0	(Salvadoran Football Federation) Santa Tecla
6	MF	Narciso Orellana	28 January 1995 (aged 24)	21	0	(Salvadoran Football Federation) Alianza
7	MF	Darwin Cerén	31 December 1989 (aged 29)	48	2	(United States Soccer Federation) Houston Dynamo
8	FW	David Rugamas	17 February 1990 (aged 29)	6	1	(Salvadoran Football Federation) FAS
9	FW	Nelson Bonilla	11 September 1990 (aged 28)	40	14	(Football Association of Thailand) Bangkok United
10	MF	Jaime Alas	30 July 1989 (aged 29)	67	6	(National Football Federation of Guatemala) Municipal
11	FW	Juan Carlos Portillo	26 December 1991 (aged 27)	2	0	(Salvadoran Football Federation) Alianza
12	MF	Marvin Monterrosa	3 March 1991 (aged 28)	10	0	(Salvadoran Football Federation) Alianza
13	MF	Santos Ortíz	22 January 1993 (aged 26)	8	0	(Salvadoran Football Federation) Águila
14	MF	Andrés Flores	31 August 1990 (aged 28)	61	0	(United States Soccer Federation) Portland Timbers
15	DF	Jonathan Jiménez	12 July 1992 (aged 26)	12	0	(Salvadoran Football Federation) Alianza
16	MF	Óscar Cerén	23 October 1991 (aged 27)	27	5	(Salvadoran Football Federation) Alianza
17	FW	Brayan Paz	14 November 1997 (aged 21)	0	0	(Salvadoran Football Federation) Águila
18	GK	Kevin Carabantes	20 March 1995 (aged 24)	1	0	(Salvadoran Football Federation) Limeño
19	MF	Gerson Mayen	9 February 1989 (aged 30)	35	3	(Salvadoran Football Federation) Santa Tecla
20	DF	Rubén Marroquín	15 October 1992 (aged 26)	2	0	(Salvadoran Football Federation) Alianza
21	DF	Bryan Tamacas	21 February 1995 (aged 24)	23	1	(Paraguayan Football Association) Sportivo Luqueño
22	GK	Oscar Pleitéz	6 February 1993 (aged 26)	0	0	(Salvadoran Football Federation) Isidro Metapán
23	MF	Diego Coca	26 August 1994 (aged 24)	4	0	(Salvadoran Football Federation) Águila

=== Curaçao ===
Head coach: Remko Bicentini

The final squad was announced on 7 June 2019. Kenji Gorré replaced Gervane Kastaneer.

No.	Pos.	Player	Date of birth (age)	Caps	Goals	Club
1	GK	Eloy Room	6 February 1989 (aged 30)	26	0	(Royal Dutch Football Association) PSV Eindhoven
2	DF	Cuco Martina (captain)	25 September 1989 (aged 29)	41	1	(Royal Dutch Football Association) Feyenoord
3	DF	Shermar Martina	14 April 1996 (aged 23)	4	0	(Royal Dutch Football Association) MVV Maastricht
4	DF	Darryl Lachman	11 November 1989 (aged 29)	24	1	(Royal Dutch Football Association) PEC Zwolle
5	DF	Jurich Carolina	15 July 1998 (aged 20)	6	0	(Royal Dutch Football Association) NAC Breda
6	MF	Michaël Maria	31 January 1995 (aged 24)	14	0	(United States Soccer Federation) Charlotte Independence
7	FW	Jarchinio Antonia	27 December 1990 (aged 28)	18	0	(Cyprus Football Association) AEL Limassol
8	MF	Roly Bonevacia	8 October 1991 (aged 27)	0	0	(Football Australia) Western Sydney Wanderers
9	FW	Charlison Benschop	21 August 1989 (aged 29)	3	0	(German Football Association) FC Ingolstadt
10	MF	Leandro Bacuna	21 August 1991 (aged 27)	21	9	(Football Association of Wales) Cardiff City
11	FW	Gevaro Nepomuceno	10 November 1992 (aged 26)	36	8	(The Football Association) Oldham Athletic
12	MF	Shanon Carmelia	20 March 1989 (aged 30)	37	2	(Royal Dutch Football Association) IJsselmeervogels
13	DF	Juriën Gaari	23 December 1993 (aged 25)	7	0	(Royal Dutch Football Association) RKC Waalwijk
14	FW	Kenji Gorré	29 September 1994 (aged 24)	0	0	(Portuguese Football Federation) Estoril
15	MF	Shermaine Martina	14 April 1996 (aged 23)	2	0	(Royal Dutch Football Association) MVV Maastricht
16	FW	Gino van Kessel	9 March 1993 (aged 26)	19	8	(Royal Belgian Football Association) Roeselare
17	MF	Zinjo Constansia	6 April 1990 (aged 29)	4	0	(Curaçao Football Federation) Jong Holland
18	FW	Elson Hooi	1 October 1991 (aged 27)	19	6	(Royal Dutch Football Association) ADO Den Haag
19	FW	Jafar Arias	16 June 1995 (aged 23)	0	0	(Royal Dutch Football Association) Emmen
20	MF	Jimbertson Vapor	10 February 1996 (aged 23)	0	0	(Curaçao Football Federation) Scherpenheuvel
21	MF	Ayrton Statie	22 July 1994 (aged 24)	9	0	(Royal Dutch Football Association) Lienden
22	GK	Jarzinho Pieter	11 November 1987 (aged 31)	12	0	(Curaçao Football Federation) Vesta
23	GK	Zeus de la Paz	11 March 1995 (aged 24)	2	0	(The Football Association) Oldham Athletic

== Group D ==
=== United States ===
Head coach: Gregg Berhalter

The 40-man provisional squad was announced on 20 May 2019. The final 23-man squad was announced on 5 June. On 11 June, the injured Tyler Adams was replaced by Reggie Cannon. On 15 June, the injured Duane Holmes was replaced by Djordje Mihailovic.

No.	Pos.	Player	Date of birth (age)	Caps	Goals	Club
1	GK	Zack Steffen	2 April 1995 (aged 24)	9	0	(United States Soccer Federation) Columbus Crew SC
2	DF	Nick Lima	17 November 1994 (aged 24)	3	0	(United States Soccer Federation) San Jose Earthquakes
3	DF	Omar Gonzalez	11 October 1988 (aged 30)	50	3	(Canadian Soccer Association) Toronto FC
4	MF	Michael Bradley (captain)	31 July 1987 (aged 31)	145	17	(Canadian Soccer Association) Toronto FC
5	DF	Walker Zimmerman	19 May 1993 (aged 26)	6	2	(United States Soccer Federation) Los Angeles FC
6	MF	Wil Trapp	15 January 1993 (aged 26)	16	0	(United States Soccer Federation) Columbus Crew SC
7	FW	Paul Arriola	5 February 1995 (aged 24)	22	3	(United States Soccer Federation) D.C. United
8	MF	Weston McKennie	28 August 1998 (aged 20)	8	1	(German Football Association) Schalke 04
9	FW	Gyasi Zardes	2 September 1991 (aged 27)	44	7	(United States Soccer Federation) Columbus Crew SC
10	MF	Christian Pulisic	18 September 1998 (aged 20)	25	10	(The Football Association) Chelsea
11	FW	Jordan Morris	26 October 1994 (aged 24)	27	5	(United States Soccer Federation) Seattle Sounders FC
12	GK	Sean Johnson	31 May 1989 (aged 30)	7	0	(United States Soccer Federation) New York City FC
13	DF	Tim Ream	5 October 1987 (aged 31)	29	1	(The Football Association) Fulham
14	DF	Reggie Cannon	11 June 1998 (aged 21)	2	0	(United States Soccer Federation) FC Dallas
15	MF	Cristian Roldan	3 June 1995 (aged 24)	10	0	(United States Soccer Federation) Seattle Sounders FC
16	DF	Daniel Lovitz	27 August 1991 (aged 27)	4	0	(Canadian Soccer Association) Montreal Impact
17	FW	Jozy Altidore	6 November 1989 (aged 29)	110	41	(Canadian Soccer Association) Toronto FC
18	FW	Jonathan Lewis	4 June 1997 (aged 22)	4	0	(United States Soccer Federation) Colorado Rapids
19	DF	Matt Miazga	19 July 1995 (aged 23)	13	1	(The Football Association) Reading
20	MF	Djordje Mihailovic	10 November 1998 (aged 20)	3	1	(United States Soccer Federation) Chicago Fire
21	FW	Tyler Boyd	30 December 1994 (aged 24)	0	0	(Turkish Football Federation) Ankaragücü
22	GK	Tyler Miller	12 March 1993 (aged 26)	0	0	(United States Soccer Federation) Los Angeles FC
23	DF	Aaron Long	12 October 1992 (aged 26)	5	0	(United States Soccer Federation) New York Red Bulls

=== Panama ===
Head coach: Julio Dely Valdés

The 40-man provisional squad was announced on 20 May 2019. The 23-man final squad was announced on 4 June 2019. Ernesto Walker later replaced Aníbal Godoy.

No.	Pos.	Player	Date of birth (age)	Caps	Goals	Club
1	GK	Luis Mejía	16 March 1991 (aged 28)	19	0	(Uruguayan Football Association) Nacional
2	DF	Francisco Palacios	10 December 1990 (aged 28)	4	0	(Panamanian Football Federation) San Francisco
3	DF	Harold Cummings	1 March 1992 (aged 27)	57	1	(United States Soccer Federation) San Jose Earthquakes
4	DF	Fidel Escobar	9 January 1995 (aged 24)	33	1	(Panamanian Football Federation) Sporting San Miguelito
5	DF	Román Torres (captain)	20 March 1986 (aged 33)	110	10	(United States Soccer Federation) Seattle Sounders FC
6	DF	Kevin Galván	10 March 1996 (aged 23)	2	0	(Panamanian Football Federation) Sporting San Miguelito
7	MF	Jose Luis Rodriguez	19 June 1998 (aged 20)	12	0	(Royal Spanish Football Federation) Alavés B
8	MF	Marcos Sánchez	23 December 1989 (aged 29)	37	2	(Panamanian Football Federation) Tauro
9	FW	Gabriel Torres	31 October 1988 (aged 30)	77	13	(Football Federation of Chile) Universidad de Chile
10	MF	Yoel Bárcenas	23 October 1993 (aged 25)	33	0	(Royal Spanish Football Federation) Oviedo
11	MF	Armando Cooper	26 November 1987 (aged 31)	104	7	(Israel Football Association) Maccabi Petah Tikva
12	GK	José Calderón	14 August 1985 (aged 33)	34	0	(National Football Federation of Guatemala) Guastatoya
13	DF	Adolfo Machado	14 February 1985 (aged 34)	80	2	(Bolivian Football Federation) The Strongest
14	FW	Valentín Pimentel	30 May 1991 (aged 28)	25	1	(Panamanian Football Federation) Plaza Amador
15	DF	Erick Davis	31 March 1991 (aged 28)	46	0	(Slovak Football Association) Dunajská Streda
16	FW	Rolando Blackburn	9 January 1990 (aged 29)	32	5	(Bolivian Football Federation) The Strongest
17	FW	José Fajardo	18 August 1993 (aged 25)	4	0	(Saudi Arabian Football Federation) Al-Kawkab
18	FW	Abdiel Arroyo	13 December 1993 (aged 25)	41	5	(Panamanian Football Federation) Árabe Unido
19	MF	Alberto Quintero	18 December 1987 (aged 31)	93	4	(Peruvian Football Federation) Universitario
20	MF	Ernesto Walker	9 February 1999 (aged 20)	3	0	(United States Soccer Federation) LA Galaxy
21	MF	Omar Browne	3 May 1994 (aged 25)	4	0	(Canadian Soccer Association) Montreal Impact
22	GK	Orlando Mosquera	25 December 1994 (aged 24)	0	0	(Panamanian Football Federation) Tauro
23	DF	Michael Amir Murillo	11 February 1996 (aged 23)	29	1	(United States Soccer Federation) New York Red Bulls

=== Trinidad and Tobago ===
Head coach: Dennis Lawrence

The 40-man provisional squad was announced on 20 May 2019. The 23-man final squad was announced on 5 June 2019. Aubrey David replaced Leland Archer.

No.	Pos.	Player	Date of birth (age)	Caps	Goals	Club
1	GK	Marvin Phillip	1 August 1984 (aged 34)	69	0	(Trinidad and Tobago Football Association) Central
2	DF	Aubrey David	11 October 1990 (aged 28)	44	1	(Costa Rican Football Federation) Saprissa
3	MF	Joevin Jones	3 August 1991 (aged 27)	68	7	(United States Soccer Federation) Seattle Sounders FC
4	MF	Neveal Hackshaw	21 September 1995 (aged 23)	9	0	(United States Soccer Federation) Indy Eleven
5	DF	Daneil Cyrus	15 December 1990 (aged 28)	76	0	(Saudi Arabian Football Federation) Al-Orobah
6	MF	Duane Muckette	1 July 1995 (aged 23)	1	0	(United States Soccer Federation) Memphis 901
7	MF	Cordell Cato	15 July 1992 (aged 26)	27	2	(United States Soccer Federation) Oklahoma City Energy
8	MF	Khaleem Hyland (captain)	5 June 1989 (aged 30)	80	4	(Saudi Arabian Football Federation) Al-Faisaly
9	FW	Shahdon Winchester	8 January 1992 (aged 27)	25	6	(Trinidad and Tobago Football Association) W Connection
10	MF	Kevin Molino	17 June 1990 (aged 28)	43	19	(United States Soccer Federation) Minnesota United FC
11	MF	Levi García	20 November 1997 (aged 21)	16	2	(Israel Football Association) Beitar Jerusalem
12	DF	Carlyle Mitchell	8 August 1987 (aged 31)	33	3	(Trinidad and Tobago Football Association) La Horquetta Rangers
13	MF	Nathan Lewis	20 July 1990 (aged 28)	20	2	(United States Soccer Federation) Lansing Ignite
14	MF	Akeem Humphrey	25 November 1995 (aged 23)	1	0	(Trinidad and Tobago Football Association) Club Sando
15	DF	Curtis Gonzales	26 January 1989 (aged 30)	30	0	(Trinidad and Tobago Football Association) Defence Force
16	DF	Alvin Jones	9 July 1994 (aged 24)	15	1	(United States Soccer Federation) Oklahoma City Energy
17	DF	Mekeil Williams	24 July 1990 (aged 28)	21	1	(United States Soccer Federation) Oklahoma City Energy
18	FW	Lester Peltier	13 September 1988 (aged 30)	38	6	(Saudi Arabian Football Federation) Al-Orobah
19	MF	Kevan George	30 January 1990 (aged 29)	41	0	(United States Soccer Federation) Charlotte Independence
20	MF	Jomal Williams	28 April 1994 (aged 25)	13	2	(Trinidad and Tobago Football Association) W Connection
21	GK	Greg Ranjitsingh	18 July 1993 (aged 25)	0	0	(United States Soccer Federation) Orlando City SC
22	GK	Adrian Foncette	10 October 1988 (aged 30)	11	0	(Trinidad and Tobago Football Association) Police
23	MF	Leston Paul	11 March 1990 (aged 29)	19	0	(United States Soccer Federation) Memphis 901

=== Guyana ===
Head coach: (Jamaica) Michael Johnson

The 40-man provisional squad was announced on 20 May 2019. The final squad was announced on 30 May 2019. On 13 June, the injured Warren Creavalle was replaced by Brandon Beresford.

No.	Pos.	Player	Date of birth (age)	Caps	Goals	Club
1	GK	Akel Clarke	25 October 1988 (aged 30)	5	0	(Surinamese Football Association) Walking Boyz Company
2	DF	Kevin Layne	1 January 1998 (aged 21)	2	0	(Guyana Football Federation) Guyana Defence Force
3	DF	Kadell Daniel	3 June 1994 (aged 25)	3	1	(The Football Association) Dover Athletic
4	MF	Elliot Bonds	23 March 2000 (aged 19)	1	0	(The Football Association) Dagenham & Redbridge
5	DF	Jordan Dover	14 December 1994 (aged 24)	0	0	(United States Soccer Federation) Pittsburgh Riverhounds
6	DF	Ronayne Marsh-Brown	13 November 1984 (aged 34)	3	0	(The Football Association) Peterborough Sports
7	FW	Keanu Marsh-Brown	10 August 1992 (aged 26)	1	0	(Football Association of Wales) Newport County
8	DF	Sam Cox (captain)	10 October 1990 (aged 28)	11	0	(The Football Association) Wealdstone
9	FW	Sheldon Holder	30 September 1991 (aged 27)	20	7	(Trinidad and Tobago Football Association) Morvant Caledonia United
10	FW	Emery Welshman	9 November 1991 (aged 27)	9	7	(Canadian Soccer Association) Forge FC
11	FW	Callum Harriott	4 March 1994 (aged 25)	1	0	(The Football Association) Reading
12	FW	Pernell Schultz	7 April 1994 (aged 25)	3	2	(Guyana Football Federation) Western Tigers
13	DF	Liam Gordon	15 May 1999 (aged 20)	0	0	(The Football Association) Dagenham & Redbridge
14	MF	Daniel Wilson	1 November 1993 (aged 25)	19	1	(Guyana Football Federation) Western Tigers
15	DF	Terence Vancooten	29 December 1997 (aged 21)	2	0	(The Football Association) Stevenage
16	MF	Neil Danns	23 November 1982 (aged 36)	6	5	(The Football Association) Bury
17	FW	Terell Ondaan	9 September 1993 (aged 25)	0	0	(Royal Dutch Football Association) Telstar
18	GK	Alex Murray	21 November 1992 (aged 26)	2	0	(Guyana Football Federation) Santos
19	MF	Stephen Duke-McKenna	17 August 2000 (aged 18)	1	0	(The Football Association) Bolton Wanderers
20	DF	Matthew Briggs	6 March 1991 (aged 28)	1	0	(The Football Association) Maldon & Tiptree
21	MF	Brandon Beresford	15 July 1992 (aged 26)	14	2	(United States Soccer Federation) Peachtree City MOBA
22	GK	Quillan Roberts	26 October 1994 (aged 24)	0	0	(Canadian Soccer Association) Forge FC
23	MF	Anthony Jeffrey	3 October 1994 (aged 24)	1	0	(The Football Association) Dover Athletic

== Statistics ==
=== Age ===
All ages are set to 15 June 2019, the opening day of the tournament.

==== Players ====
- Oldest: (Costa Rica) Álvaro Saborío (37 years, 82 days)
- Youngest: (Cuba) Karel Espino (17 years, 231 days)

==== Goalkeepers ====
- Oldest: (Nicaragua) Justo Lorente (35 years, 108 days)
- Youngest: (Haiti) Josué Duverger (19 years, 49 days)

==== Captains ====
- Oldest: (Honduras) Maynor Figueroa (36 years, 44 days)
- Youngest: (Cuba) Yordan Santa Cruz (25 years, 251 days)

=== Player representation ===
==== By club ====
Clubs are ordered alphabetically: first by country, then by club name.

Players	Clubs
7	(El Salvador) Alianza
6	(Canada) Toronto FC (Martinique) Golden Lion (Nicaragua) Real Estelí
5	(Bermuda) Robin Hood; Santiago de Cuba (Martinique) Club Franciscain
4	(Canada) Montreal Impact (Canada) Vancouver Whitecaps FC (Costa Rica) Alajuelense (Costa Rica) Saprissa (Mexico) Monterrey (Nicaragua) Managua (United States) FC Cincinnati (United States) Houston Dynamo (United States) LA Galaxy (United States) Los Angeles FC (United States) New York Red Bulls (United States) Oklahoma City Energy (United States) Orlando City SC (United States) Seattle Sounders FC
3	(Bermuda) PHC Zebras (Costa Rica) Herediano (Cuba) Pinar del Río (Dominican Republic) Delfines del Este (El Salvador) Águila (El Salvador) FAS (Honduras) Olimpia (Mexico) León
2	(Bolivia) The Strongest (Canada) Forge (Costa Rica) Carmelita (Costa Rica) San Carlos (Cuba) Ciego de Ávila (Cuba) Villa Clara (Dominican Republic) Jarabacoa (El Salvador) Santa Tecla (England) Dagenham & Redbridge (England) Dover Athletic (England) Oldham Athletic (England) Reading (Guatemala) Municipal (Guatemala) Universidad (Guyana) Western Tigers (Honduras) Motagua (Jamaica) Portmore United (Martinique) Robert (Mexico) Cruz Azul (Mexico) Lobos BUAP (Mexico) Necaxa (Mexico) UANL (Netherlands) MVV Maastricht (Netherlands) PSV Eindhoven (Nicaragua) Juventus Managua (Panama) Sporting San Miguelito (Panama) Tauro (Saudi Arabia) Al-Orobah (Scotland) Celtic (Trinidad and Tobago) W Connection (Turkey) Ankaragücü (Turkey) Beşiktaş (United States) Charlotte Independence (United States) Chicago Fire (United States) Columbus Crew SC (United States) Dallas (United States) Louisville City (United States) Memphis 901 (United States) New York City FC (United States) Phoenix Rising (United States) San Jose Earthquakes (Wales) Cardiff City

=== By club nationality ===
Key
Bold	Nation represented at the tournament
Italic	Nation not a CONCACAF member

Players	Clubs
68	**United States**
28	England
20	**Mexico**
18	**Costa Rica**; **El Salvador**; **Martinique**
16	**Canada**
15	**Cuba**
13	Netherlands; **Nicaragua**
12	Spain
9	**Bermuda**
8	**Honduras**; **Panama**; **Trinidad and Tobago**
6	Dominican Republic; France
5	Belgium; Guatemala; Scotland; Turkey
4	Germany; **Guyana**; **Jamaica**; Saudi Arabia
3	Bolivia; **Curaçao**; **Haiti**; Sweden; Wales
2	Armenia; Chile; Israel; Norway; Portugal
1	Australia; Azerbaijan; Brazil; Cyprus; Denmark; Estonia; Greece; Iran; Paraguay; Peru; Qatar; Republic of Ireland; Serbia; Slovakia; Slovenia; South Korea; Suriname; Thailand; Uruguay

==== By club confederation ====
Players	Clubs
245	CONCACAF
101	UEFA
9	AFC; CONMEBOL
0	CAF; OFC
