= 2021 CONCACAF Gold Cup Group B =

Football competition

Group B of the 2021 CONCACAF Gold Cup took place from 11 to 18 July 2021 in Frisco's Toyota Stadium and Kansas City's Children's Mercy Park. The group consisted of Canada, Haiti, Martinique, and host nation the United States. The top two teams, the United States and Canada, advanced to the quarter-finals, while the other two teams were eliminated.

== Teams ==
Draw position	Team	Pot	Method of qualification	Date of qualification	Finals appearance only Gold Cup era (since 1991)	Last appearance	Previous best performance only Gold Cup era (since 1991)	CONCACAF Rankings		FIFA Rankings (May 2021)
Draw position	Team	Pot	Method of qualification	Date of qualification	Finals appearance only Gold Cup era (since 1991)	Last appearance	Previous best performance only Gold Cup era (since 1991)	August 2020 (Note: The CONCACAF rankings of August 2020 were used for seeding for the final draw.)	July 2021 (Note: CONCACAF rankings at the start of the tournament (as of 1 July 2021).)	FIFA Rankings (May 2021)
B1	United States	1	CNL League A Group A 1st place	15 November 2019	16th	2019	Winners (1991, 2002, 2005, 2007, 2013, 2017)	2	2	20
B2	Canada	2	CNL League A Group A 2nd place	11 October 2019	15th	2019	Winners (2000)	6	3	70
B3	Martinique	3	CNL League A Group C 2nd place	17 November 2019	7th	2019	Quarter-finals (2002)	11	11	N/A
B4	Haiti	4	GCQ winners	6 July 2021	8th	2019	Semi-finals (2019)	7	9	83

== Standings ==
Pos	Team	Pld	W	D	L	GF	GA	GD	Pts	Qualification
1	United States (H)	3	3	0	0	8	1	+7	9	Advance to knockout stage
2	Canada	3	2	0	1	8	3	+5	6	Advance to knockout stage
3	Haiti	3	1	0	2	3	6	−3	3	
4	Martinique	3	0	0	3	3	12	−9	0	

Source: CONCACAF
Rules for classification: Group stage tiebreakers
(H) Hosts

In the quarter-finals:

- The winners of Group B, the United States, advanced to play the runners-up of Group C, Jamaica.
- The runners-up of Group B, Canada, advanced to play the winners of Group C, Costa Rica.

== Matches ==
=== Canada vs Martinique ===
11 July 2021
18:30 (17:30 UTC−5)

Canada	4–1	Martinique
Larin 16'; Osorio 20'; Eustáquio 26'; Corbeanu 89'	Report	Rivière 10'

Children's Mercy Park, Kansas City
Attendance: 12,664
Referee: Iván Barton (El Salvador)

Canada	Martinique

GK	16	Maxime Crépeau
CB	2	Alistair Johnston	(yellow card) 90+2'
CB	5	Steven Vitória (c)	(yellow card) 49'
CB	4	Kamal Miller		(substituted off) 77'
RM	22	Richie Laryea
CM	7	Stephen Eustáquio	(yellow card) 8'	(substituted off) 74'
CM	14	Mark-Anthony Kaye	(yellow card) 43'	(substituted off) 63'
LM	12	Tajon Buchanan
RF	10	Junior Hoilett		(substituted off) 62'
CF	17	Cyle Larin		(substituted off) 74'
LF	21	Jonathan Osorio
Substitutions:
FW	9	Lucas Cavallini	(yellow card) 84'	(substituted on) 62'
MF	6	Samuel Piette		(substituted on) 63'
MF	8	Liam Fraser	(yellow card) 79'	(substituted on) 74'
FW	11	Theo Corbeanu		(substituted on) 74'
DF	15	Doneil Henry		(substituted on) 77'
Head coach:
(England) John Herdman

GK	23	Gilles Meslien
RB	22	Romario Barthéléry		(substituted off) 46'
CB	6	Jean-Sylvain Babin
CB	21	Sébastien Crétinoir (c)
LB	17	Patrick Burner	(yellow card) 7'
RM	8	Yordan Thimon		(substituted off) 64'
CM	19	Daniel Hérelle	(yellow card) 51'
CM	5	Karl Vitulin	(yellow card) 53'	(substituted off) 64'
LM	10	Kévin Fortuné
CF	20	Stéphane Abaul
CF	11	Emmanuel Rivière		(substituted off) 82'
Substitutions:
DF	18	Samuel Camille		(substituted on) 46'
FW	12	Johnny Marajo		(substituted on) 64'
FW	13	Christophe Jougon		(substituted on) 64'
FW	9	Enrick Reuperné		(substituted on) 82'
Head coach:
Mario Bocaly

Man of the Match:
Junior Hoilett (Canada)

Assistant referees:
David Morán (El Salvador)
Zachari Zeegelaar (Suriname)
Fourth official:
Oshane Nation (Jamaica)
Video assistant referee:
Edvin Jurisevic (United States)
Assistant video assistant referee:
Juan Gabriel Calderón (Costa Rica)

=== United States vs Haiti ===
11 July 2021
21:00 (20:00 UTC−5)

United States	1–0	Haiti
Vines 8'	Report

Children's Mercy Park, Kansas City
Attendance: 12,664
Referee: Saíd Martínez (Honduras)

United States	Haiti

GK	1	Matt Turner
RB	20	Shaq Moore		(substituted off) 76'
CB	5	Walker Zimmerman
CB	12	Miles Robinson
LB	3	Sam Vines
CM	23	Kellyn Acosta	(yellow card) 72'
CM	14	Jackson Yueill		(substituted off) 62'
CM	17	Sebastian Lletget (c)
RF	7	Paul Arriola		(substituted off) 14'
CF	9	Gyasi Zardes	(yellow card) 75'
LF	15	Jonathan Lewis		(substituted off) 62'
Substitutions:
FW	8	Nicholas Gioacchini		(substituted on) 14' (substituted off) 76'
MF	6	Gianluca Busio		(substituted on) 62'
FW	11	Daryl Dike		(substituted on) 62'
MF	19	Eryk Williamson		(substituted on) 76'
DF	16	James Sands		(substituted on) 76'
Head coach:
Gregg Berhalter

GK	1	Brian Sylvestre
RB	2	Carlens Arcus
CB	4	Ricardo Adé (c)
CB	13	Kevin Lafrance
LB	17	Martin Expérience	(yellow card) 47'	(substituted off) 80'
CM	21	Bryan Alceus
CM	14	Leverton Pierre		(substituted off) 90+1'
RW	5	Stéphane Lambese
AM	10	Derrick Etienne Jr.
LW	9	Duckens Nazon		(substituted off) 80'
CF	7	Carnejy Antoine
Substitutions:
DF	22	Alex Junior Christian		(substituted on) 80'
FW	18	Ronaldo Damus		(substituted on) 80'
MF	15	Dutherson Clerveaux		(substituted on) 90+1'
Head coach:
Jean-Jacques Pierre

Man of the Match:
Walker Zimmerman (United States)

Assistant referees:
Walter López (Honduras)
Geovany García (El Salvador)
Fourth official:
Diego Montaño (Mexico)
Video assistant referee:
Erick Miranda (Mexico)
Assistant video assistant referee:
León Barajas (Mexico)

=== Haiti vs Canada ===
15 July 2021
19:30 (18:30 UTC−5)

Haiti	1–4	Canada
Lambese 56'	Report	Eustáquio 5'; Larin 51', 74' (pen.); Hoilett 79' (pen.)

Children's Mercy Park, Kansas City
Attendance: 7,511
Referee: Juan Gabriel Calderón (Costa Rica)

Haiti	Canada

GK	1	Brian Sylvestre
RB	2	Carlens Arcus
CB	4	Ricardo Adé (c)
CB	3	Francois Dulysse	(red card) 78'
LB	17	Martin Expérience		(substituted off) 52'
CM	15	Dutherson Clerveaux		(substituted off) 89'
CM	14	Leverton Pierre	(yellow card) 47'
RW	5	Stéphane Lambese
AM	10	Derrick Etienne Jr.
LW	22	Alex Junior Christian
CF	7	Carnejy Antoine
Substitutions:
FW	18	Ronaldo Damus		(substituted on) 52'
MF	16	Bicou Bissainthe		(substituted on) 89'
Head coach:
Jean-Jacques Pierre

GK	16	Maxime Crépeau
CB	15	Doneil Henry
CB	5	Steven Vitória (c)
CB	4	Kamal Miller
RM	2	Alistair Johnston		(substituted off) 63'
CM	7	Stephen Eustáquio	(yellow card) 82'
CM	14	Mark-Anthony Kaye
LM	12	Tajon Buchanan		(substituted off) 77'
RF	21	Jonathan Osorio		(substituted off) 63'
CF	9	Lucas Cavallini		(substituted off) 63'
LF	17	Cyle Larin		(substituted off) 77'
Substitutions:
DF	22	Richie Laryea		(substituted on) 63'
FW	10	Junior Hoilett		(substituted on) 63'
MF	6	Samuel Piette		(substituted on) 63'
FW	20	Ayo Akinola		(substituted on) 77'
FW	3	Tyler Pasher		(substituted on) 77'
Head coach:
(England) John Herdman

Man of the Match:
Cyle Larin (Canada)

Assistant referees:
William Arrieta (Costa Rica)
Caleb Wales (Trinidad and Tobago)
Fourth official:
Benjamín Pineda (Costa Rica)
Video assistant referee:
Allen Chapman (United States)
Assistant video assistant referee:
Tim Ford (United States)

=== Martinique vs United States ===
15 July 2021
22:00 (21:00 UTC−5)

Martinique	1–6	United States
Rivière 64' (pen.)	Report	Dike 14', 59'; Camille 23' (o.g.); Robinson 50'; Zardes 70'; Gioacchini 90'

Children's Mercy Park, Kansas City
Attendance: 7,511
Referee: Mario Escobar (Guatemala)

Martinique	United States

GK	23	Gilles Meslien
CB	4	Gérald Dondon
CB	6	Jean-Sylvain Babin	(substituted off) 57'
CB	21	Sébastien Crétinoir (c)
CM	19	Daniel Hérelle	(substituted off) 76'
CM	20	Stéphane Abaul
CM	10	Kévin Fortuné	(substituted off) 69'
RW	17	Patrick Burner
LW	18	Samuel Camille
CF	12	Johnny Marajo	(substituted off) 76'
CF	11	Emmanuel Rivière	(substituted off) 69'
Substitutions:
FW	13	Christophe Jougon	(substituted on) 57'
DF	8	Yordan Thimon	(substituted on) 69'
FW	9	Enrick Reuperné	(substituted on) 69'
MF	14	Norman Grelet	(substituted on) 76'
MF	5	Karl Vitulin	(substituted on) 76'
Head coach:
Mario Bocaly

GK	1	Matt Turner
RB	20	Shaq Moore	(substituted off) 58'
CB	5	Walker Zimmerman (c)	(substituted off) 79'
CB	16	James Sands
CB	12	Miles Robinson
LB	21	George Bello
CM	19	Eryk Williamson	(substituted off) 79'
CM	6	Gianluca Busio
AM	13	Matthew Hoppe	(substituted off) 58'
CF	10	Cristian Roldan
CF	11	Daryl Dike	(substituted off) 68'
Substitutions:
FW	8	Nicholas Gioacchini	(substituted on) 58'
MF	23	Kellyn Acosta	(substituted on) 58'
FW	9	Gyasi Zardes	(substituted on) 68'
DF	4	Donovan Pines	(substituted on) 79'
MF	14	Jackson Yueill	(substituted on) 79'
Head coach:
Gregg Berhalter

Man of the Match:
Daryl Dike (United States)

Assistant referees:
Nicholas Anderson (Jamaica)
Jassett Kerr (Jamaica)
Fourth official:
Diego Montaño (Mexico)
Video assistant referee:
Ángel Monroy (Mexico)
Assistant video assistant referee:
Juan Rangel (Mexico)

=== Martinique vs Haiti ===
18 July 2021
17:00 (16:00 UTC−5)

Martinique	1–2	Haiti
Fortuné 53'	Report	Antoine 3'; Adé 61'

Toyota Stadium, Frisco
Attendance: 243
Referee: Ismael Cornejo (El Salvador)

Martinique	Haiti

GK	16	Arnaud Huyghues des Etages
RB	5	Karl Vitulin
CB	4	Gérald Dondon		(substituted off) 55'
CB	21	Sébastien Crétinoir (c)	(red card) 59'
LB	18	Samuel Camille		(substituted off) 46'
RM	12	Johnny Marajo		(substituted off) 55'
CM	13	Christophe Jougon
CM	19	Daniel Hérelle
LM	8	Yordan Thimon	(yellow card) 19'	(substituted off) 55'
CF	11	Emmanuel Rivière		(substituted off) 17'
CF	20	Stéphane Abaul
Substitutions:
FW	10	Kévin Fortuné		(substituted on) 17'
FW	17	Patrick Burner	(red card) 78'	(substituted on) 46'
MF	14	Norman Grelet	(yellow card) 90+1'	(substituted on) 55'
FW	9	Enrick Reuperné		(substituted on) 55'
DF	6	Jean-Sylvain Babin	(yellow card) 72'	(substituted on) 55'
Head coach:
Mario Bocaly

GK	1	Brian Sylvestre
RB	5	Stéphane Lambese
CB	2	Carlens Arcus
CB	4	Ricardo Adé (c)
LB	22	Alex Junior Christian
CM	15	Dutherson Clerveaux
CM	14	Leverton Pierre
CM	16	Bicou Bissainthe
RF	7	Carnejy Antoine
CF	18	Ronaldo Damus
LF	10	Derrick Etienne Jr.
Head coach:
Jean-Jacques Pierre

Man of the Match:
Ricardo Adé (Haiti)

Assistant referees:
Juan Zumba (El Salvador)
Geovany García (El Salvador)
Fourth official:
Bryan López (Guatemala)
Video assistant referee:
Tim Ford (United States)
Assistant video assistant referee:
Fernando Hernández (Mexico)

=== United States vs Canada ===
18 July 2021
17:00 (16:00 UTC−5)

United States	1–0	Canada
Moore 1'	Report

Children's Mercy Park, Kansas City
Attendance: 18,467
Referee: Adonai Escobedo (Mexico)

United States	Canada

GK	1	Matt Turner
RB	20	Shaq Moore	(substituted off) 58'
CB	5	Walker Zimmerman (c)	(substituted off) 15'
CB	16	James Sands
CB	12	Miles Robinson
LB	3	Sam Vines
DM	23	Kellyn Acosta	(substituted off) 75'
CM	17	Sebastian Lletget
CM	6	Gianluca Busio	(substituted off) 74'
CF	11	Daryl Dike
CF	9	Gyasi Zardes	(substituted off) 75'
Substitutions:
DF	4	Donovan Pines	(substituted on) 15'
DF	2	Reggie Cannon	(substituted on) 58'
MF	14	Jackson Yueill	(substituted on) 74'
MF	10	Cristian Roldan	(substituted on) 75'
FW	13	Matthew Hoppe	(substituted on) 75'
Head coach:
Gregg Berhalter

GK	16	Maxime Crépeau
CB	2	Alistair Johnston
CB	5	Steven Vitória (c)
CB	4	Kamal Miller
RM	22	Richie Laryea
CM	6	Samuel Piette	(substituted off) 74'
CM	8	Liam Fraser
LM	12	Tajon Buchanan
RF	10	Junior Hoilett	(substituted off) 74'
CF	20	Ayo Akinola	(substituted off) 24'
LF	17	Cyle Larin	(substituted off) 53'
Substitutions:
MF	21	Jonathan Osorio	(substituted on) 24'
FW	9	Lucas Cavallini	(substituted on) 53'
FW	3	Tyler Pasher	(substituted on) 74'
MF	14	Mark-Anthony Kaye	(substituted on) 74'
Head coach:
(England) John Herdman

Man of the Match:
Shaq Moore (United States)

Assistant referees:
Michel Morales (Mexico)
Henri Pupiro (Nicaragua)
Fourth official:
Keylor Herrera (Costa Rica)
Video assistant referee:
Carlos Ayala (Mexico)
Assistant video assistant referee:
Joel Rangel (Mexico)

== Discipline ==
Fair play points would have been used as a tiebreaker should the overall and head-to-head records of teams were tied. These were calculated based on yellow and red cards received in all group matches as follows:

- first yellow card: minus 1 point;
- indirect red card (second yellow card): minus 3 points;
- direct red card: minus 4 points;
- yellow card and direct red card: minus 5 points;

Only one of the above deductions was applied to a player in a single match.

Team	Match 1				Match 2				Match 3				Points
Team	Booked	(yellow card) (yellow-red card)	Sent off (straight red)	(yellow card) (red card)	Booked	(yellow card) (yellow-red card)	Sent off (straight red)	(yellow card) (red card)	Booked	(yellow card) (yellow-red card)	Sent off (straight red)	(yellow card) (red card)	Points
United States	2												–2
Haiti	1				1		1						–6
Canada	6				1								–7
Martinique	3								3		2		–14
