= Nelson Johnston =

Cuban footballer

Personal information
- Full name: Nelson Johnston Barrientos
- Date of birth: 25 February 1990 (age 36)
- Place of birth: Santiago de Cuba, Cuba
- Height: 1.82 m (6 ft 0 in)
- Position: Goalkeeper

Team information
- Current team: ADR Cóbano

Senior career*
Years	Team	Apps	(Gls)
- FC Santiago de Cuba
2021–2022	C.D. Real Sociedad	17	(0)
2022–2025	A.D.R. Jicaral		
2025–2026	Santa Cruz PFA		
2026–	ADR Cóbano		

International career
2018–	Cuba	9	(0)
- * Club domestic league appearances and goals

Nelson Johnston Barrientos (born 25 February 1990) is a Cuban professional footballer who plays as a goalkeeper for Costa Rican club ADR Cóbano and the Cuba national team.

He made his international debut in a friendly match in a 3–1 friendly defeat to Nicaragua.

Johnston appeared in the CONCACAF Nations League, the 2019 CONCACAF Gold Cup held in Costa Rica, Jamaica, and the United States, and last appeared the qualifying matches for the 2022 FIFA World Cup to be held in Qatar.

== Honors ==
=== FC Santiago de Cuba ===
- Liga Nacional Clausura Champion: 2017, 2018, 2019
