= Sandro Cutiño =

Cuban association footballer

Personal information
- Full name: Sandro Cutiño Castellano
- Date of birth: 3 March 1995 (age 31)
- Place of birth: Manatí, Cuba
- Height: 1.93 m (6 ft 4 in)
- Position: Defender

Senior career*
| Years | Team | Apps | (Gls) |
| 2016–2018 | Las Tunas | 42 | (2) |
| 2018–2020 | Sancti Spíritus | | |
| 2020 | Managua | 13 | (0) |
| 2020– | Navegantes | | |
| 2021– | → Força e Luz (loan) | 0 | (0) |

International career^{‡}
| 2015 | Cuba U20 | 5 | (0) |
| 2019– | Cuba | 5 | (0) |
- * Club domestic league appearances and goals as of 13:42, 26 March 2021 (UTC) ‡ National team caps and goals as of 13:42, 26 March 2021 (UTC)

Sandro Cutiño Castellano (born 3 March 1995) is a Cuban international footballer who plays as a defender for Brazilian side Força e Luz, on loan from Navegantes.

== Career statistics ==
=== Club ===
As of 26 March 2021.

| Club | Season | League | | | Cup | | Other | | Total | |
| Club | Season | Division | Apps | Goals | Apps | Goals | Apps | Goals | Apps | Goals |
|---|---|---|---|---|---|---|---|---|---|---|
| Las Tunas | 2016 | Campeonato Nacional | 11 | 0 | 0 | 0 | 0 | 0 | 11 | 0 |
| Las Tunas | 2017 | Campeonato Nacional | 19 | 0 | 0 | 0 | 0 | 0 | 19 | 0 |
| Las Tunas | 2018 | Campeonato Nacional | 12 | 2 | 0 | 0 | 0 | 0 | 12 | 2 |
| Las Tunas | Total | | 42 | 2 | 0 | 0 | 0 | 0 | 42 | 2 |
| Managua | 2019–20 | Liga Primera | 13 | 0 | 0 | 0 | 0 | 0 | 13 | 0 |
| Força e Luz (loan) | 2021 | – | | | 0 | 0 | 0 | 0 | 0 | 0 |
| Career total | | | 55 | 2 | 0 | 0 | 0 | 0 | 55 | 2 |

=== International ===
As of match played 26 March 2021.

| National team | Year | Apps | Goals |
|---|---|---|---|
| Cuba | 2019 | 2 | 0 |
| Cuba | 2021 | 1 | 0 |
| Total | | 3 | 0 |
