= 2019 Liga Nacional de Cuba =

Liga Nacional de Cuba
- Season: 2019
- Champions: FC Santiago de Cuba
- Highest attendance: 3,000 FC Santiago de Cuba vs FC La Habana

The 2019 Liga Nacional de Fútbol de Cuba was the 108th season of the Campeonato Nacional de Fútbol de Cuba, the top division football competition in Cuba. The season began on 19 January 2019.

== Apertura ==
=== Group A Occidental ===
Pos	Team	Pld	W	D	L	GF	GA	GD	Pts	Qualification or relegation
1	Cienfuegos	14	10	1	3	23	10	+13	31	Advance to Final stage
2	Villa Clara	14	9	1	4	17	9	+8	28	Advance to Final stage
3	La Habana	14	8	3	3	27	11	+16	27	Advance to Final stage
4	Artemisa	14	7	4	3	18	11	+7	25	Advance to Final stage
5	Matanzas	14	6	5	3	22	18	+4	23	
6	Isla de La Juventud	14	2	4	8	8	14	−6	10	
7	Pinar del Río	14	2	3	9	9	18	−9	9	
8	Mayabeque	14	0	3	11	5	38	−33	3	

Source: Soccerway

=== Group B Oriental ===
Pos	Team	Pld	W	D	L	GF	GA	GD	Pts	Qualification or relegation
1	Santiago de Cuba	14	9	3	2	16	9	+7	30	Advance to Final stage
2	Guantánamo	14	8	3	3	21	12	+9	27	Advance to Final stage
3	Camagüey	14	5	5	4	16	15	+1	20	Advance to Final stage
4	Granma	14	6	2	6	19	19	0	20	Advance to Final stage
5	Sancti Spíritus	14	4	7	3	15	10	+5	19	
6	Ciego de Ávila	14	3	7	4	14	13	+1	16	
7	Las Tunas	14	3	3	8	8	19	−11	12	
8	Holguín	14	2	2	10	10	22	−12	8	

Source: Soccerway

== Clausura ==
Pos	Team	Pld	W	D	L	GF	GA	GD	Pts	Qualification or relegation
1	Santiago de Cuba (C)	7	4	2	1	11	5	+6	14 (Note: The title was decided by a two-legged playoff between the top two teams. First leg: La Habana 3–2 Santiago de Cuba; Second leg: Santiago de Cuba 1–0 La Habana (3–3 on aggregate, Santiago de Cuba won on goal differences).)	Caribbean Club Shield
2	La Habana	7	4	2	1	7	4	+3	14	
3	Villa Clara	7	4	0	3	8	7	+1	12	
4	Camagüey	7	4	0	3	11	7	+4	12	
5	Artemisa	7	4	0	3	12	9	+3	12	
6	Guantánamo	7	2	2	3	9	12	−3	8	
7	Cienfuegos	7	2	0	5	4	10	−6	6	
8	Granma	7	0	2	5	5	13	−8	2	

Source: Soccerway
(C) Champions
Notes:

Final stage stadiums:

Team	Location	Stadium	Capacity
FC Santiago de Cuba	Santiago de Cuba	Pista de Atletismo de Rekortan	5,000
FC La Habana	Havana	Estadio La Polar	2,000
FC Villa Clara	Zulueta	Estadio Camilo Cienfuegos	5,000
FC Camagüey	Minas	Terreno Sebastopol	1,000
FC Artemisa	Guanajay	Estadio de Guanajay	3,000
FC Guantánamo	Guantánamo	Estadio Rogelio Palacios	5,000
FC Cienfuegos	Cienfuegos	Estadio Luis Pérez Lozano	4,000
CF Granma	Jiguaní	Estadio Ramón Gómez Silvera	2,000
