= Alex Murray =

Alex Murray may refer to:

- Alex Murray (Australian footballer) (1885–1947), Australian rules footballer
- Alex Murray (footballer, born 1992), Guyanese football goalkeeper
- Alex Wharton (later Alex Murray, born 1939), British singer, producer and manager

== See also ==
- Alexander Murray (disambiguation)
