= Baisden (disambiguation) =

Baisden is a surname.

Baisden may also refer to:

- Baisden, Logan County, West Virginia
- Baisden, Mingo County, West Virginia
