= Basden =

Basden is a surname. Notable people with the surname include:

- A. E. Basden (died 1948), British philatelist
- Chikosi Basden (born 1995), Bermudian footballer
- Dwight Basden (born 1972), Bermudian cricketer
- Eddie Basden (born 1983), American basketballer
- George Basden (1873–1944), archdeacon of The Niger
- Richard Basden (born 1967), Bermudian cricketer
- Tom Basden (born 1980), English actor

== See also ==
- Baisden, surname
