= Agenor (disambiguation) =

Agenor was in Greek mythology and history a Phoenician king of Tyre or Sidon.

Agenor may also refer to:

== People ==
- Agénor, both a masculine French given name and a surname
- Agenor Báez (born 1997), Nicaraguan footballer
- Agenor Girardi (1952–2018), Roman Catholic bishop
- Agenor Maria Gołuchowski (1849–1921), Austro-Hungarian statesman, son of Agenor Romuald Gołuchowski
- Agenor Romuald Gołuchowski (1812–1875), Polish-Austrian politician
- Agenor Mafra-Neto (born 1964), Brazilian ecologist and entrepreneur
- Agenor Muniz (born 1949), Brazilian-born Australian former footballer
- Agenor Muñiz (1910–1962), Uruguayan footballer
- Agenor de Miranda Araújo Neto (1958–1990), stage name Cazuza, Brazilian singer-songwriter
- Agenor Moreira Sampaio (1891–1962), Brazilian practitioner of the martial art of capoeira
- Agenor (footballer, born 1938), Brazilian football left winger Agenor Eugênio Rodrigues (1938–2018)
- Agenor (footballer, born 1981), Brazilian football defensive midfielder Agenor Figueiredo Santos
- Agenor (footballer, born 1989), Brazilian football goalkeeper Agenor Detofol

== Other uses ==
- Agenor (mythology), various Greek mythological characters
- USS Agenor, a landing craft repair ship
- 1873 Agenor, an asteroid
- The military track of the European Maritime Awareness in the Strait of Hormuz (AGENOR)
