= 2017 Liga Nacional de Cuba =

Liga Nacional de Cuba
- Season: 2017
- Champions: FC Santiago de Cuba

The 2017 Liga Nacional de Cuba was the 106th season of the competition. The season began on 19 February 2017 and concluded on 1 July 2017.

== First stage ==
=== Group A ===
Pos	Team	Pld	W	D	L	GF	GA	GD	Pts	Qualification or relegation
1	Villa Clara	12	5	3	4	17	12	+5	18	Final stage
2	Las Tunas	12	5	3	4	14	15	−1	18	Final stage
3	Sancti Spíritus	12	4	3	5	10	13	−3	15	
4	Granma	12	3	5	4	8	9	−1	14	Relegation playoffs

Updated to match(es) played on unknown. Source:

=== Group B ===
Pos	Team	Pld	W	D	L	GF	GA	GD	Pts	Qualification or relegation
1	Ciego de Ávila	11	4	6	1	18	14	+4	18	Final stage
2	Camagüey	12	3	7	2	14	13	+1	16	Final stage
3	Guantánamo	12	2	7	3	10	11	−1	13	
4	Artemisa	11	2	4	5	11	15	−4	10	Relegation playoffs

Updated to match(es) played on unknown. Source:

=== Group C ===
Pos	Team	Pld	W	D	L	GF	GA	GD	Pts	Qualification or relegation
1	Santiago de Cuba	12	9	3	0	20	1	+19	30	Final stage
2	Cienfuegos	12	3	5	4	7	10	−3	14	Final stage
3	Isla de La Juventud	12	2	7	3	7	5	+2	13	
4	La Habana	12	0	5	7	2	20	−18	5	Relegation playoffs

Updated to match(es) played on unknown. Source:

== Final stage ==
Pos	Team	Pld	W	D	L	GF	GA	GD	Pts
1	Santiago de Cuba	10	6	4	0	20	8	+12	22
2	Camagüey	9	5	3	1	22	8	+14	18
3	Ciego de Ávila	10	5	1	4	18	11	+7	16
4	Villa Clara	10	3	3	4	12	15	−3	12
5	Cienfuegos	10	2	1	7	11	24	−13	7
6	Las Tunas	9	2	0	7	7	24	−17	6

Updated to match(es) played on unknown. Source:
