= Walter Benítez =

Walter Benítez may refer to:

- Walter Benítez (football manager) (born 1972), Cuban football manager
- Walter Benítez (footballer) (born 1993), Argentine goalkeeper
