= Agenorides =

Ancient Greek mythological figures

Agenorides (Ancient Greek: Ἀγηνορίδης) is a patronymic of Agenor, designating a descendant of any one of the ancient Greeks who was named Agenor, but usually used to describe only the descendants of Agenor, such as Cadmus, Phineus, and Perseus.

== Argive genealogy in Greek mythology ==
Argive genealogy in Greek mythology

Inachus	Melia
Zeus	Io	Phoroneus
Epaphus	Memphis
Libya	Poseidon
Belus	Achiroë	Agenor	Telephassa
Danaus	Elephantis	Aegyptus	Cadmus	Cilix	Europa	Phoenix
Mantineus	Hypermnestra	Lynceus	Harmonia	Zeus
Polydorus
Sparta	Lacedaemon	Ocalea	Abas	Agave	Sarpedon	Rhadamanthus
Autonoë
Eurydice	Acrisius	Ino	Minos
Zeus	Danaë	Semele	Zeus
Perseus	Dionysus

Colour key:

Male
Female
Deity
