= 2018 Liga Nacional de Cuba =

Liga Nacional de Cuba
- Season: 2018
- Champions: Santiago de Cuba
- Caribbean Club Shield: Santiago de Cuba

The 2018 Liga Nacional de Cuba was the 107th season of the top-tier football league in Cuba. The season began on 19 February and ended on 30 June 2018.

== Group stage ==
=== Group A ===
Pos	Team	Pld	W	D	L	GF	GA	GD	Pts	Qualification or relegation
1	Santiago de Cuba	12	8	2	2	20	6	+14	26	Final stage
2	Sancti Spíritus	12	4	4	4	8	9	−1	16	Final stage
3	Las Tunas	12	4	3	5	9	16	−7	15	
4	La Habana	12	3	1	8	10	16	−6	10	Relegation playoffs

Updated to match(es) played on unknown. Source:

=== Group B ===
Pos	Team	Pld	W	D	L	GF	GA	GD	Pts	Qualification or relegation
1	Pinar del Río	12	6	4	2	17	11	+6	22	Final stage
2	Camagüey	12	5	2	5	15	13	+2	17	Final stage
3	Cienfuegos	12	5	2	5	15	16	−1	17	
4	Isla de La Juventud	12	3	2	7	12	19	−7	11	Relegation playoffs

Updated to match(es) played on unknown. Source:

=== Group C ===
Pos	Team	Pld	W	D	L	GF	GA	GD	Pts	Qualification or relegation
1	Ciego de Ávila	11	7	2	2	24	11	+13	23	Final stage
2	Granma	12	5	3	4	14	16	−2	18	Final stage
3	Guantánamo	11	4	2	5	17	14	+3	14	
4	Villa Clara	12	3	1	8	13	27	−14	10	Relegation playoffs

Updated to match(es) played on unknown. Source:

== Final stage ==
Pos	Team	Pld	W	D	L	GF	GA	GD	Pts
1	Santiago de Cuba	10	7	1	2	16	5	+11	22
2	Ciego de Ávila	10	6	1	3	20	14	+6	19
3	Pinar del Río	10	3	5	2	14	15	−1	14
4	Camagüey	10	3	3	4	14	15	−1	12
5	Sancti Spíritus	10	2	3	5	12	19	−7	9
6	Granma	10	2	1	7	13	21	−8	7

Updated to match(es) played on unknown. Source:

== Attendances ==
The 2018 Campeonato Nacional clubs sorted by average home league attendance:

#	Club	Average
1	Santiago de Cuba	417
2	La Habana	322
3	Pinar del Río	308
4	Sancti Spíritus	243
5	Camagüey	238
6	Cienfuegos	231
7	Granma	192
8	Las Tunas	187
9	Villa Clara	179
10	Ciego de Ávila	174
11	Guantánamo	164
12	Isla de la Juventud	138
Average per club		233
