= Carnejy Antoine =

Footballer (born 1991)

Personal information
- Date of birth: 27 July 1991 (age 35)
- Place of birth: Paris, France
- Height: 1.91 m (6 ft 3 in)
- Position: Forward

Youth career
- 1999–2011: Noisy-le-Sec

Senior career*
Years	Team	Apps	(Gls)
2011–2013	Noisy-le-Sec	10	(2)
2013–2014	RE Bertrix	24	(6)
2014–2016	Prix-lès-Mézières		
2018–2019	Saint-Jean-le-Blanc	23	(18)
2019–2020	Saint-Pryvé Saint-Hilaire	11	(8)
2020–2022	Orléans	42	(13)
2022–2023	Casa Pia	21	(5)
2023	Hapoel Haifa	11	(0)
2023–2024	Torreense	10	(1)
2024	Feirense	17	(5)
2024–2025	Valenciennes	18	(3)
2024–2025	Valenciennes II	4	(0)

International career^{‡}
2021–	Haiti	21	(12)
- * Club domestic league appearances and goals as of 26 May 2025 ‡ National team caps and goals as of 15 September 2023

Carnejy Antoine (French pronunciation: [kɑʁnɛʒi ɑ̃.twan]; born 27 July 1991) is a professional footballer who plays as a forward. Born in France, he plays for the Haiti national team.

== Club career ==
=== Noisy-le-Sec ===
Born in Paris 18e, Antoine began playing organized football with Olympique Noisy-le-Sec's academy at the age of 8, and began his senior career with the Eastern Paris club in 2011. In the 2012–13 season, his debut goal came during a 3–1 win against Oissel in the Championnat de France Amateur 2. He made 10 appearances as his side finished 10th in the group, barely avoiding relegation to Régional 1.

=== Bertrix ===
He spent his early career with semi-pro clubs in France and Belgium. He played for RE Bertrix, AS Prix-lès-Mézières, FC Saint-Jean-le-Blanc, and Saint-Pryvé Saint-Hilaire FC. In 2013, he joined RE Bertrix of the Belgian Third Amateur Division. After appearing in 24 games, scoring 6 goals, he helped his team to again barely avoid the relegation playoffs, finishing 12th in the group.

At the end of the season, he left the club.

=== Saint-Jean-le-Blanc ===
After two years in the obscurity of the Régional 1 with Prix-lès-Mézières, he became a free agent in 2016 and eventually joined FC Saint-Jean-le-Blanc for the 2018–19 season.

He was a crucial starting player and their top scorer, scoring 18 in 23 matches as they finished rock-bottom of the table with 22 points.

=== Saint-Pryvé Saint-Hilaire ===
After just one season with Saint-Jean-le-Blanc, he joined Saint-Pryvé Saint-Hilaire. He was the joint top scorer at the 2019–20 Coupe de France with Pablo Sarabia.

=== Orléans ===
On 29 June 2020, he signed his first professional contract with Orléans in the Championnat National.

=== Casa Pia ===
On 19 January 2022, Antoine signed with Casa Pia in Portugal until the end of the 2022–23 season.

=== Hapoel Haifa ===
On 31 January 2023, Antoine signed for Israeli Premier League club Hapoel Haifa.

=== Torreense ===
On 27 July 2023, he returned to Portugal, joining Liga Portugal 2 club Torreense.

=== Feirense ===
On 17 January 2024, Antoine left Torreense and signed for fellow Liga Portugal 2 side Feirense.

=== Valenciennes ===
On 14 June 2024, Antoine signed for Championnat National club Valenciennes.

== International career ==
Born in France, Antoine is of Haitian descent. He was called up to represent the Haiti national team in June 2021. He debuted for Haiti in a 10–0 2022 FIFA World Cup qualification win over Turks and Caicos Islands on 5 June 2021, scoring a brace in his first start for the team.

== Career statistics ==
=== International ===
As of match played 12 September 2023

Appearances and goals by national team and year
National team	Year	Apps	Goals
Haiti	2021	8	5
Haiti	2022	5	5
Haiti	2023	8	2
Total		21	12

Scores and results list Haiti'a goal tally first, score column indicates score after each Antoine goal.

List of international goals scored by Carnejy Antoine
No.	Date	Venue	Opponent	Score	Result	Competition
1	5 June 2021	TCIFA National Academy, Providenciales, Turks and Caicos Islands	Turks and Caicos Islands	5–0	10–0	2022 FIFA World Cup qualification
2	5 June 2021	TCIFA National Academy, Providenciales, Turks and Caicos Islands	Turks and Caicos Islands	6–0	10–0	2022 FIFA World Cup qualification
3	5 June 2021	TCIFA National Academy, Providenciales, Turks and Caicos Islands	Turks and Caicos Islands	8–0	10–0	2022 FIFA World Cup qualification
4	2 July 2021	DRV PNK Stadium, Fort Lauderdale, United States	Saint Vincent and the Grenadines	6–1	6–1	2021 CONCACAF Gold Cup qualification
5	18 July 2021	Toyota Stadium, Frisco, United States	Martinique	1–0	2–1	2021 CONCACAF Gold Cup
6	27 March 2022	DRV PNK Stadium, Fort Lauderdale, United States	Guatemala	1–0	1–2	Friendly
7	7 June 2022	Félix Sánchez Olympic Stadium, Santo Domingo, Dominican Republic	Montserrat	2–0	3–2	2022–23 CONCACAF Nations League B
8	11 June 2022	Synthetic Track and Field Facility, Leonora, Guyana	Guyana	3–1	6–2	2022–23 CONCACAF Nations League B
9	14 June 2022	Félix Sánchez Olympic Stadium, Santo Domingo, Dominican Republic	Guyana	5–0	6–0	2022–23 CONCACAF Nations League B
10	14 June 2022	Félix Sánchez Olympic Stadium, Santo Domingo, Dominican Republic	Guyana	6–0	6–0	2022–23 CONCACAF Nations League B
11	28 March 2023	Estadio Panamericano, San Cristóbal, Dominican Republic	Bermuda	3–0	3–1	2022–23 CONCACAF Nations League B
12	13 June 2023	The Gardens North County District Park, Palm Beach Gardens, United States	Saint Kitts and Nevis	1–1	3–1	Friendly

== Honours ==
Individual

- Coupe de France top scorer: 2019–20 (joint)
