= Sandy Sánchez =

Cuban footballer

Personal information
- Full name: Sandy Sánchez Mustelier
- Date of birth: 24 May 1994 (age 32)
- Place of birth: Manatí, Cuba
- Height: 1.85 m (6 ft 1 in)
- Position: Goalkeeper

Team information
- Current team: Atlético Pantoja
- Number: 1

Senior career*
Years	Team	Apps	(Gls)
2012–2019	Las Tunas		
2022–	Atlético Pantoja	29	(0)

International career^{‡}
2011	Cuba U-17	5	(0)
2012–13	Cuba U-20	14	(0)
2014	Cuba U-21	5	(0)
2015–2023	Cuba	26	(1)
- * Club domestic league appearances and goals ‡ National team caps and goals as of 26 June 2023

Sandy Sánchez Mustelier (born 24 May 1994) is a Cuban professional footballer who plays as a goalkeeper for Liga Dominicana club Atlético Pantoja and the Cuba national team.

== International career ==
Sánchez played in all three matches for Cuba at the 2013 FIFA U-20 World Cup.

He made his full international debut versus Curaçao on 11 June 2015. He was named in the squad for the 2015 CONCACAF Gold Cup.

In July 2023, following Cuba's game against Canada in the 2023 CONCACAF Gold Cup group stage, Sánchez defected to the United States.

== Career statistics ==
=== International goals ===
Scores and results list Cuba's goal tally first.

No.	Date	Venue	Opponent	Score	Result	Competition
1.	27 February 2019	Estadio Pedro Marrero, Havana, Cuba	Bermuda	5–0	5–0	Friendly
