= Alexander Murray =

Alexander Murray may refer to:

== Public figures ==
=== United Kingdom ===
- Earl of Dunmore
  - Alexander Murray, 6th Earl of Dunmore (1804–1845)
  - Alexander Murray, 8th Earl of Dunmore (1872–1962), British soldier, politician and Victoria Cross recipient
- Lord Elibank
  - Alexander Murray, 4th Lord Elibank (1677–1736), see Lord Elibank
  - Alexander Murray, 7th Lord Elibank (1747–1820), Scottish peer
  - Alexander Murray, 8th Lord Elibank (1780–1830), see Lord Elibank
  - Alexander Oliphant-Murray, 9th Lord Elibank (1804–1871), father of Montolieu Oliphant-Murray, 1st Viscount Elibank
- Alexander Murray of Drumdewan (died 1599), Scottish soldier
- Alexander Murray of Elibank (1712–1778), Scottish Jacobite, fourth son of Alexander Murray, 4th Lord Elibank
- Alexander Murray, 1st Baron Murray of Elibank (1870–1920), British nobleman and Liberal politician
- Alexander Murray (knight), Lord of Culbin and Newton
- Alexander Murray, Lord Henderland (1736–1795), Scottish judge and politician
- Sir Alexander Murray, 3rd Baronet (died 1743), British politician, MP for Peeblesshire 1710–13
- Alexander Murray (died 1750), Scottish politician
- Alexander Murray (1789–1845), Scottish politician, MP for Kirkcudbright Stewartry 1838–45

=== Canada ===
- Alexander Murray (British Army officer, died 1762) (c. 1715–1762)
- Alexander Murray (Manitoba politician) (1839–1913), Canadian politician in the province of Manitoba
- Alexander Clark Murray (politician) (1900–1983), Canadian Member of Parliament for Oxford

=== Australia ===
- Alexander Murray (manufacturer) (1803–1880), manufacturer of biscuits and jam; South Australian politician
- Alexander Borthwick Murray (1816–1903), South Australian sheep breeder and parliamentarian

=== United States ===
- Alexander Murray (1755–1821), U.S. Navy officer, Revolutionary War
- Alexander Murray (1816–1884), U.S. Navy officer, Mexican-American and American Civil Wars
- Alexander C. Murray, American mayor of Fall River, Massachusetts
- Alexander W. Murray (1864–1927), Los Angeles Police Department commander

== Others ==
- Alexander Murray (geologist) (1810–1884), Scottish geologist
- Alexander Murray (linguist) (1775–1813), Scottish linguist and professor of Oriental languages at the University of Edinburgh
- Alexander Hunter Murray (died 1874/9–1874), Hudson's Bay Company fur trader and artist
- Alexander Stuart Murray (1841–1904), archaeologist
- Alexander Robertson Murray (1872–1956), president of the Bengal Chamber of Commerce
- Alexander Murray (flautist) (born 1929); British flautist

== See also ==
- Alex Murray (disambiguation)
- Alex Murry, a character in Madeleine L'Engle's novel A Wrinkle in Time
