= Stéphane Lambese =

Haitian footballer (born 1995)

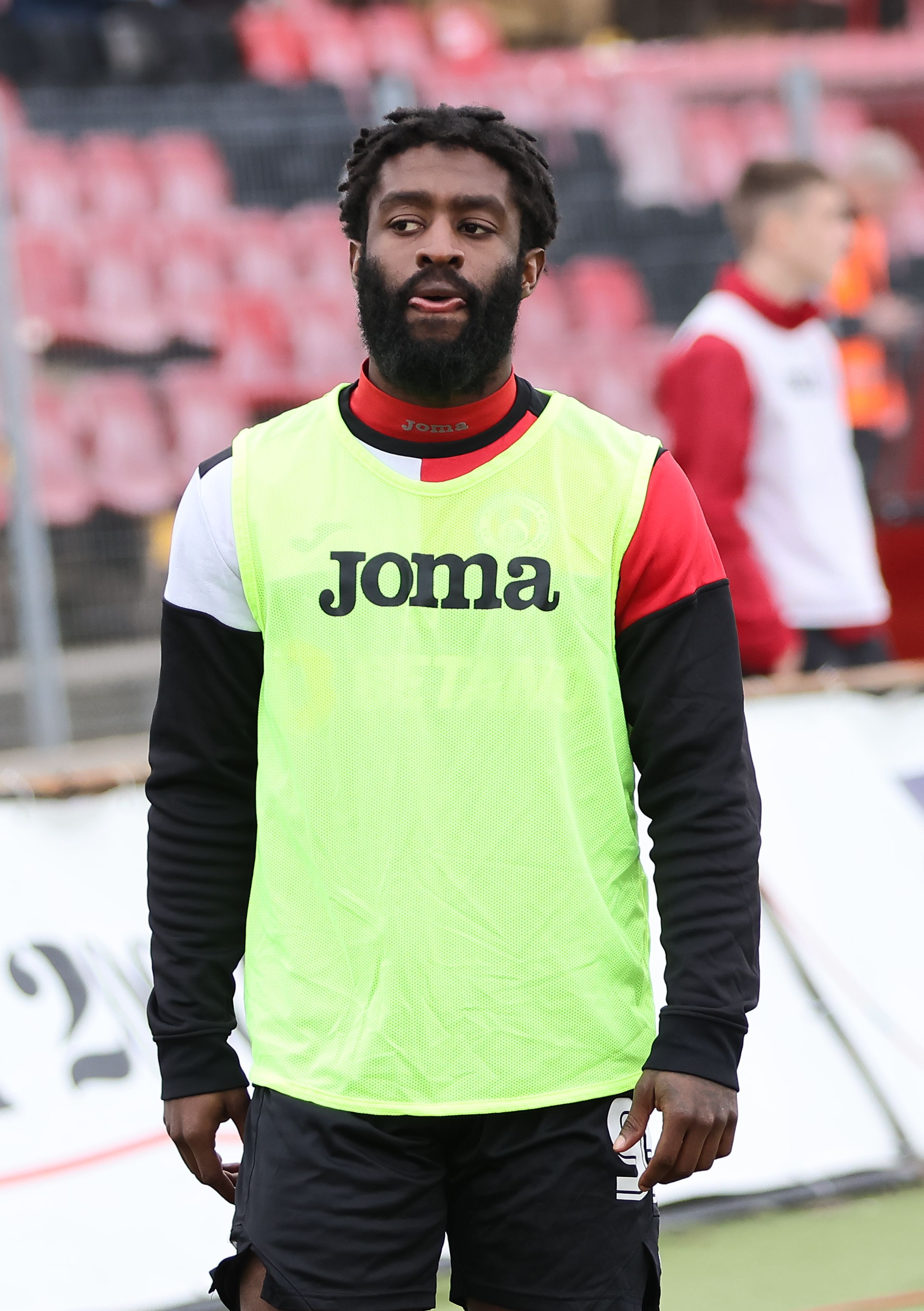
- Lambese in 2024

Personal information
- Date of birth: 10 November 1995 (age 31)
- Place of birth: Nogent-sur-Marne, France
- Height: 1.74 m (5 ft 9 in)
- Position: Right back

Team information
- Current team: LB Châteauroux
- Number: 27

Youth career
- 2004–2008: Olympique de Sevran
- 2008–2013: Paris Saint-Germain

Senior career*
Years	Team	Apps	(Gls)
2013–2016	Paris Saint-Germain B	45	(0)
2017	Blois Foot 41	11	(1)
2017–2019	Lorient II	25	(0)
2018–2019	→ Laval (loan)	30	(1)
2019–2021	Orléans	50	(1)
2021–2022	Quevilly-Rouen	25	(1)
2023–2024	Lokomotiv Sofia	33	(1)
2025–2026	Fleury	22	(0)
2026–	LB Châteauroux	4	(1)

International career^{‡}
2010–2011	France U16	4	(1)
2015	Haiti U20		
2015–	Haiti	24	(1)
- * Club domestic league appearances and goals as of 23 June 2026 ‡ National team caps and goals as of 22:48, 18 November 2025 (UTC)

Stéphane Lambese (born 10 November 1995) is a professional footballer who plays as a right back for LB Châteauroux. Born in France, he represents Haiti internationally.

== Club career ==
Born in Nogent-sur-Marne, France, Lambese began his career in 2004 with Olympique de Sevran, before moving in the summer of 2009 to the youth of Paris Saint-Germain. In the summer of 2012, he moved from the youth in the reserve of PSG. He signed his first professional contract with the club in the summer of 2015, but left the club at the end of the 2015–16 season.

In January 2017 Lambese signed a short-term contract with Blois Football 41 in Championnat National 3. At the end of the season he signed a one-year contract with Lorient B. After training several times with the senior team, he signed a professional contract with Lorient in May 2018.

He moved on loan from Lorient to Stade Lavallois in July 2018. After a successful season, he signed for Ligue 2 side Orléans in May 2019, agreeing a three-year contract. He made his debut at the professional level in the first game of the 2019–20 Ligue 2 season on 26 July 2019, a 0–0 draw against Nancy.

On 29 July 2021, he signed with Ligue 2 club Quevilly-Rouen.

== International career ==
Lambese represented 2010 in four international for the French U-16 football team. Since 2014, he represents the national team of Haiti, he is part of the U-20 national team. Lambese participated in an unofficial friendly match against the Kosovo national team on 7 March 2014.

Lambese was part of the Haiti squad for the Copa América Centenario in 2016.

== Career statistics ==
=== Club ===
As of match played 7 November 2025

Appearances and goals by club, season and competition
Club	Season	League			Cup		League Cup		Other		Total	
Club	Season	Division	Apps	Goals	Apps	Goals	Apps	Goals	Apps	Goals	Apps	Goals
Paris Saint-Germain B	2012–13	Ligue 3	1	0	—		—		—		1	0
Paris Saint-Germain B	2013–14	Ligue 3	6	0	—		—		—		6	0
Paris Saint-Germain B	2014–15	Ligue 3	19	0	—		—		—		19	0
Paris Saint-Germain B	2015–16	Ligue 3	19	0	—		—		—		19	0
Paris Saint-Germain B	Total		45	0	—		—		—		45	0
Blois Football 41	2016–17	National 3	11	1	—		—		—		11	1
Lorient II	2017–18	CFA 2	25	0	—		—		—		25	0
Laval	2018–19	Ligue 3	30	1	0	0	0	0	—		30	1
Orléans	2019–20	Ligue 2	21	0	1	0	0	0	—		22	0
Orléans	2020–21	Ligue 3	29	0	3	0	—		—		32	0
Orléans	Total		50	0	4	0	0	0	—		54	0
Quevilly-Rouen	2021–22	Ligue 2	25	1	3	0	—		—		28	1
Lokomotiv Sofia	2023–24	First League	18	1	—		—		—		18	1
Lokomotiv Sofia	2024–25	First League	15	0	2	0	—		—		17	0
Lokomotiv Sofia	Total		33	1	2	0	—		—		35	1
Fleury	2025–26	Ligue 3	9	0	2	0	—		—		11	0
Career total			228	4	11	0	0	0	0	0	239	4

=== International ===
As of match played 18 November 2025

Appearances and goals by national team and year
National team	Year	Apps	Goals
Haiti	2015	1	0
Haiti	2016	2	0
Haiti	2019	3	0
Haiti	2021	9	1
Haiti	2023	2	0
Haiti	2024	4	0
Haiti	2025	2	0
Total		24	1

Scores and results list Haiti's goal tally first.

List of international goals scored by Stephane Lambese
No.	Date	Venue	Opponent	Score	Result	Competition
1	15 July 2021	Children's Mercy Park, Kansas City, United States	Canada	1–2	1–4	2021 CONCACAF Gold Cup
