= Shermar Martina =

Curaçaoan footballer

Personal information
- Full name: Shermar Donald Emigdio Martina
- Date of birth: 14 April 1996 (age 30)
- Place of birth: Willemstad, Curaçao
- Height: 1.80 m (5 ft 11 in)
- Position: Defender

Youth career
- 2008–2015: MVV Maastricht

Senior career*
Years	Team	Apps	(Gls)
2015–2021	MVV Maastricht	111	(1)
2022–2023	FK Kauno Žalgiris	13	(1)

International career^{‡}
2018–	Curaçao	4	(0)
- * Club domestic league appearances and goals as of 30 November 2023 ‡ National team caps and goals as of 24 May 2019

Shermar Donald Emigdio Martina (born 14 April 1996) is a Curaçaoan football player who plays for the Curaçao national team.

== Club career ==
He made his professional debut in the Eerste Divisie for MVV Maastricht on 1 May 2015 in a game against FC Den Bosch.

In January 2022 he signed with Lithuanian FK Kauno Žalgiris.

== International career ==
Shermar made his international debut for the Curaçao national football team in a 1–1 friendly tie with Bolivia on 23 March 2018.

== Personal life ==
He is a twin brother of Shermaine Martina, also a professional footballer.

== Honours ==
Curaçao

- King's Cup: 2019
