= FC Santiago de Cuba =

Cuban football club

- Full name: Fútbol Club Santiago de Cuba
- Nickname: Diablos Rojos (The Red Devils)
- Ground: Estadio José Pepe del Cabo, Santiago de Cuba, Cuba
- Capacity: 5,000
- Manager: Leonardo Herrera
- League: Liga Nacional de Fútbol
- 2025: Apertura Group D: 2nd Apertura Overall: 8th Clausura: 2nd Clausura Playoffs: 2nd
Home colours

Fútbol Club Santiago de Cuba is a Cuban professional football club based in the city of Santiago de Cuba, which currently plays in the Campeonato Nacional. Its home stadium is the 5,000-capacity Estadio "José Pepe del Cabo" on the campus of the Pista de Atletismo de Rekortan. It was promoted to Campeonato Nacional for the 2015 season.

== History ==
=== 2017 Liga Nacional de Futbol ===
In the 102nd season of the Liga Nacional de Cuba, Santiago de Cuba, coached by Italian and future Cuba national team coach, Lorenzo Mambrini, won the Clausura on the second to last matchday. On the second to last match-day, against FC Ciego de Ávila, in a 2-1 win, Santiago reached 21 points, with goals from Yoandir Puga and Eddy Olivares. FC Camagüey had 15 points, with 2 more games left, although due to head-to-head records of both teams, even if Camagüey were to win both games, they couldn't win the title, giving Santiago de Cuba the 2017 Clausura title.

=== 2019 season ===
==== 2019 Liga Nacional de Futbol ====
Santiago de Cuba once against won the 2019 Liga Nacional de Cuba in the 104th season. This was their third win a row, something that hasn't happened since FC Villa Clara won all three tournaments from 2011 to 2013. Santiago won thanks to Yasmani López scoring the sole goal in a 1-0 win against FC La Habana, at home in their Rekortán Stadium.

==== 2019 Caribbean Club Shield ====
After winning the 2018 Liga Nacional, Santiago de Cuba made history by being the first Cuban team to qualify for the 2019 Caribbean Club Shield, being hosted in Curaçao. Santiago were placed in Group A of the tournament, getting first place in the only group with 4 teams. In their first matchup, they tied hosts CRKSV Jong Holland 0-0, and also tied Caymanian side Scholars International SC with the same score of 0-0 in their second match. In their final group stage game, they beat Guyanese side Fruta Conquerors FC 4-0, with a brace scored by Rolando Abreu, and a goal each from Jorge Villalón and Eddy Olivares, topping the group with 5 points, tied with Jong Holland, but winning on goal differential. In the quarter-final, Santiago lost 2-0 against their matchup against runner-up of Group B, Weymouth Wales FC, from Barbados. This marks the last time any Cuban team has played on an international level.

=== 2020 season ===
==== 2020 Caribbean Club Shield ====
In 2020, Santiago was planned to play in the 2020 Caribbean Club Shield, once again in placed in Curaçao, being placed in Group B, after winning the 2019 Liga Nacional. They were planned to play Metropolitan FA from Puerto Rico, Inter Moengotapoe from Suriname, and once again Scholars International SC from the Cayman Islands, but the tournament was postponed on 13 March due to COVID-19, and cancelled 25 August.

=== 2022 season ===
Santiago de Cuba won the 2022 Apertura in a 7-0 blowout in the final to FC Artemisa.

=== 2023 season ===
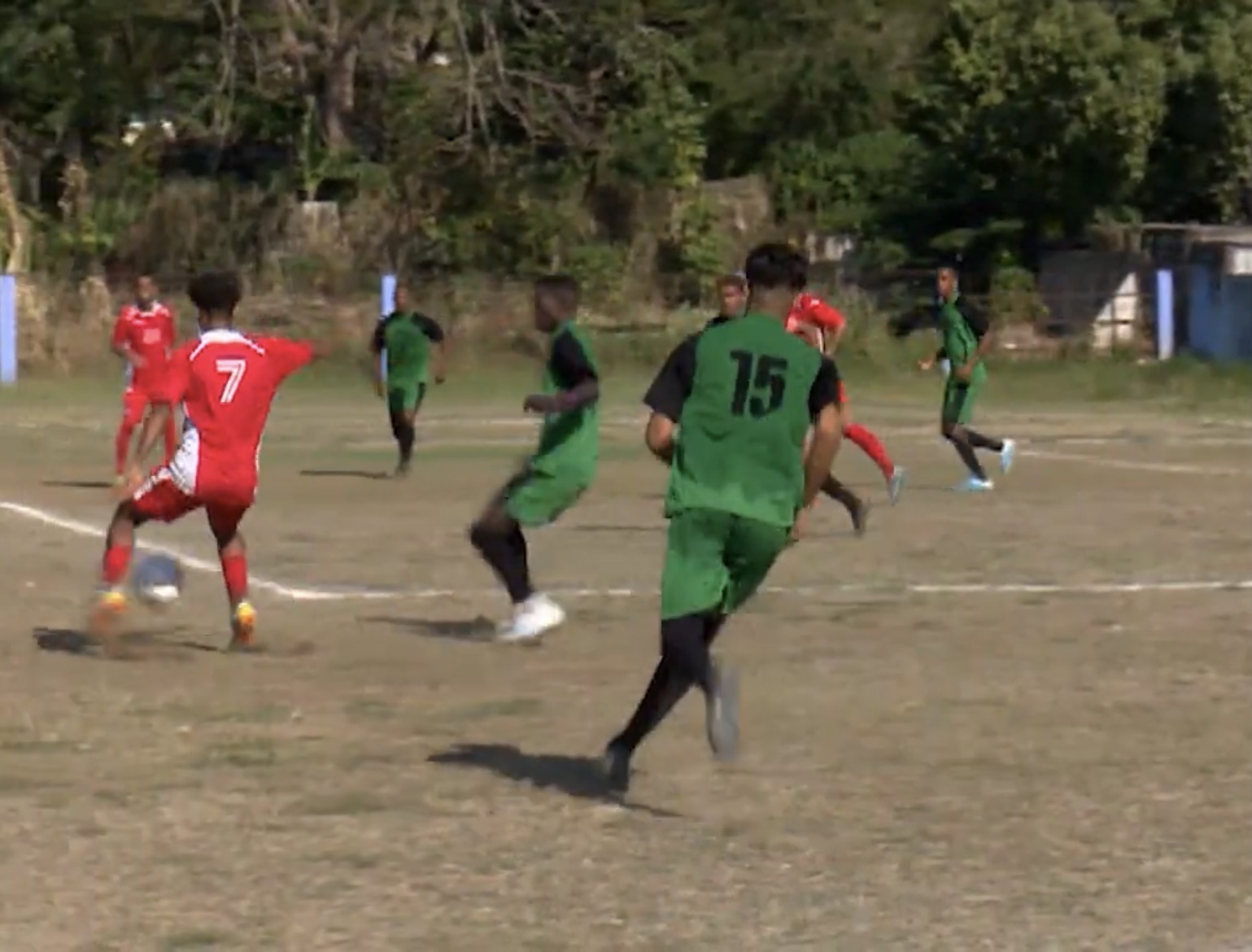
Apertura Final 2023, at Luis Pérez Lozano Stadium, Cienfuegos

Santiago as well won the 2023 Apertura, beating FC Cienfuegos away at Luis Pérez Lozano Stadium in the final. They beat Cienfuegos with a score of 1-2, with Cienfuegos scoring first with a goal by Jassael Herrera in the 27th minute, then Santiago scored in the 45+1 minute with a goal by Neiser Sandó Hervé, and another goal in the second half at the 77th minute by Carlos Espinosa, to give Santiago the title. They once again played Cienfuegos in the SuperCopa, as Cienfuegos were the Clausura winners, with Santiago also winning at Luis Pérez Lozano Stadium.

== Performance in CONCACAF competitions ==
Competition	Round	Country	Club	Score	Home/Away
2019 Caribbean Club Shield	Group A	CUW	CRKSV Jong Holland	0–0	Away
2019 Caribbean Club Shield	Group A	CYM	Scholars International SC	0–0	Neutral
2019 Caribbean Club Shield	Group A	GUY	Fruta Conquerors FC	4–0	Neutral
2019 Caribbean Club Shield	Quarter-finals	BAR	Weymouth Wales FC	0–2	Neutral
2020 Caribbean Club Shield	Group B	PRI	Metropolitan FA	Cancelled	Neutral
2020 Caribbean Club Shield	Group B	SUR	Inter Moengotapoe	Cancelled	Neutral
2020 Caribbean Club Shield	Group B	CYM	Scholars International SC	Cancelled	Neutral

== Honours ==
- Campeonato Nacional

Clausura winner: 2017, 2018, 2019
Clausura runner-up: 1993, 1994, 2022, 2025
Apertura winner: 2022, 2023
Supercopa Nacional: 2023

- CONCACAF Caribbean Shield

Quarter-finalist: 2019

== Current squad ==
Note: Flags indicate national team as defined under FIFA eligibility rules; some limited exceptions apply. Players may hold more than one non-FIFA nationality.

No.	Pos.	Nation	Player
—	GK	CUB	Alfredo López
—	GK	CUB	Yoandris Paterson
—	GK	CUB	Jonathan Fernández
—	DF	CUB	Erick Rizo
—	DF	CUB	Jorge Kindelán
—	DF	CUB	Lionis Martínez (captain)
—	DF	CUB	Raúl Pérez
—	DF	CUB	Evelio Gola
—	DF	CUB	Marlon Sánchez
—	DF	CUB	José Rubén González
—	DF	CUB	Idenis Lebrot
—	DF	CUB	Karel Pérez
—	DF	CUB	Osniel Ferret
—	DF	CUB	Reilandi Mestre
—	DF	CUB	Yoelkis Despaigne
—	MF	CUB	Yasmany Feraud
—	MF	CUB	Rolando Abreu
—	MF	CUB	Randys Revé

No.	Pos.	Nation	Player
—	MF	CUB	Carlos Espinosa
—	MF	CUB	Carlos Ibarra
—	MF	CUB	Asmel Núñez
—	MF	CUB	Léster Cervantes
—	MF	CUB	Eduardo Hernández
—	MF	CUB	Javier Cuervo
—	MF	CUB	Leandro Mena
—	MF	CUB	Máximo Montel
—	MF	CUB	Norge Luis Lorenzo
—	MF	CUB	Sergio Salgado
—	MF	CUB	Yoensy Martínez
—	FW	CUB	Eddy Gelkis
—	FW	CUB	Pablo Labrada
—	FW	CUB	Brian Savigne
—	FW	CUB	Ruslán Batista
—	FW	CUB	Luis Ciudad
—	FW	CUB	Yenier Medina
