= Gregory Eneleda =

French association football player (born 1989)

Gregory Enelada
Personal information
- Date of birth: December 1, 1989 (age 36)
- Place of birth: France
- Position: Midfielder

International career
Years	Team	Apps	(Gls)
- Martinique

Gregory Enelada (born 1 December 1989 in France is a professional footballer who plays as a midfielder internationally for Martinique.

He was part of the Martinique squad for the 2019 CONCACAF Gold Cup.
