= Jahquil Hill =

Bermudian association football player

Personal information
- Full name: Jahquil Hill
- Date of birth: 15 January 1997 (age 29)
- Position: Goalkeeper

Team information
- Current team: Robin Hood

Youth career
- United FC
- 2013–2015: Mansfield Town

Senior career*
Years	Team	Apps	(Gls)
2015–2017	Ilkeston		
2017	Stafford Rangers		
2017–2018	Rushall Olympic		
2019	Hereford	0	(0)
2019–2020	Stafford Rangers		
2020–	Robin Hood		
2021	Stalybridge Celtic (dual reg)	2	(0)

International career^{‡}
- Bermuda U17
2017–	Bermuda	7	(0)
- * Club domestic league appearances and goals as of 01:09, 25 November 2019 (UTC) ‡ National team caps and goals as of 21 June 2019

Jahquil Hill (born 15 January 1997) is a Bermudian international footballer who plays as a goalkeeper for Robin Hood.

== Club career ==
Hill played for United FC, before signing a two-year scholarship with English club Mansfield Town in 2013. He then played for Ilkeston. After leaving Ilkeston in 2017 he trialled for Chesterfield. After a spell with Stafford Rangers, he moved to Rushall Olympic in October 2017. After being scouted by Canadian club Oakville Blue Devils following their pre-season in Bermuda, he had initially agreed to join the club's U21 team, but soon after changed his mind in favour of pursuing his education. He moved to English club Hereford in March 2019.

On 7 September 2019, Hill joined Stafford Rangers.

In 2020, he joined Bermudan club Robin Hood

In October 2021 he joined Stalybridge Celtic on dual registration terms, playing in two Northern Premier League matches that month.

== International career ==
He made his international debut for Bermuda in 2017. Later that year he declined a call-up, to concentrate on his club career.

== Personal life ==
His father, Kuma Smith, was also a footballer.
