= Baisden, Logan County, West Virginia =

Unincorporated community in West Virginia, United States

Baisden, West Virginia
- Unincorporated community
- Location within West Virginia Location within the United States
- Coordinates: 37°49′12″N 82°01′43″W
- Country: United States
- State: West Virginia
- County: Logan
- Elevation: 883 ft (269 m)
- Time zone: UTC-5 (Eastern (EST))
  - Summer (DST): UTC-4 (EDT)
- Area codes: 304 & 681
- GNIS feature ID: 1553776

Baisden is an unincorporated community in Logan County, West Virginia, United States. Baisden is 2.5 miles (4.0 km) southwest of Logan.
