= Norman Grelet =

Martiniquais footballer (born 1993)

Personal information
- Full name: Norman Igor Grelet
- Date of birth: 14 July 1993 (age 33)
- Place of birth: Fort-de-France, Martinique
- Height: 1.73 m (5 ft 8 in)
- Position: Midfielder

Team information
- Current team: Golden Star

Senior career*
Years	Team	Apps	(Gls)
2011–2016	Golden Star		
2016–2017	Royan Vaux Atlantique		
2017–	Golden Star		

International career^{‡}
2018–	Martinique	3	(0)
- * Club domestic league appearances and goals as of 03:44, 6 July 2021 (UTC) ‡ National team caps and goals as of 03:44, 6 July 2021 (UTC)

Norman Igor Grelet (born 14 July 1993) is a Martiniquais professional footballer who plays as a midfielder for the club Golden Star, and the Martinique national team.

== International career ==
Grelet debuted with the Martinique national team in a 3–0 friendly win over French Guiana on 5 June 2018. He was called up to represent Martinique at the 2021 CONCACAF Gold Cup.
