= Erick Rizo =

Cuban footballer

Personal information
- Full name: Erick Ramón Rizo Rojas
- Date of birth: 28 February 1991 (age 35)
- Place of birth: Santiago de Cuba, Cuba
- Height: 1.81 m (5 ft 11 in)
- Position: Midfielder

Team information
- Current team: Santiago de Cuba

Senior career*
Years	Team	Apps	(Gls)
2015–	Santiago de Cuba		

International career
2018–	Cuba	21	(1)
- * Club domestic league appearances and goals as of 4:13, 11 June 2020 (UTC)

Erick Ramón Rizo Rojas (born 28 February 1991) is a Cuban footballer who plays for Santiago de Cuba and the Cuba national team.

== International statistics ==
As of match played 11 June 2020.

National team	Year	Apps	Goals
Cuba	2018	10	1
Cuba	2019	11	0
Total		21	1

=== International goals ===
Scores and results list Barbados' goal tally first.

No.	Date	Venue	Opponent	Score	Result	Competition
1.	29 September 2018	Estadio Pedro Marrero, Havana, Cuba	Cayman Islands	3–0	5–0	Friendly
