= Agénor =

Agénor is both a masculine French given name and a surname. Notable people with the name include:

- Agénor Bardoux (1829–1897), French politician
- Agénor de Gasparin (1810–1871), French politician and writer
- Agénor Azéma de Montgravier (1805–1863), French archaeologist and soldier
- Ronald Agénor (born 1964), Haitian tennis player
