= Shermaine Martina =

Curacaoan footballer (born 1996)

Personal information
- Full name: Shermaine Dacildes Efraim Martina
- Date of birth: 14 April 1996 (age 30)
- Place of birth: Willemstad, Netherlands Antilles
- Height: 1.81 m (5 ft 11 in)
- Position: Midfielder

Team information
- Current team: Tongeren
- Number: 5

Youth career
- 2008–2015: MVV

Senior career*
Years	Team	Apps	(Gls)
2015–2020	MVV	98	(1)
2021	North Carolina FC	11	(0)
2024–	Tongeren	27	(0)

International career
2018–2023	Curaçao	10	(0)
- * Club domestic league appearances and goals as of 12:53, 22 January 2026 (UTC)

Shermaine Dacildes Efraim Martina (born 14 April 1996) is a Curaçaoan professional footballer who plays as a midfielder for Belgian club Tongeren, and the Curaçao national team.

== Club career ==
He made his professional debut in the Eerste Divisie for MVV on 7 August 2015 in a game against Helmond Sport. His contract with MVV expired in July 2020.

In March 2021, Martina joined North Carolina FC in USL League One.

After being without a club for nearly two years, Martina signed with Belgian Division 2 club Tongeren in October 2023, with the contract effective from 1 January 2024.

== International career ==
Shermar made his international debut for the Curaçao national football team in a 1–1 friendly tie with Bolivia on 23 March 2018.

== Personal ==
He is a twin brother of Shermar Martina, also a professional footballer.

== Honours ==
=== International ===
Curaçao

- King's Cup: 2019
