= Baisden =

Baisden is a surname. Notable people with the name include:

- Harry Baisden (1893–1926), American composer
- Kendall Baisden (born 1995), American track and field sprinter
- Michael Baisden (born 1963), American radio personality
- Rylee Baisden (born 1994), American soccer player

== See also ==
- Basden, surname
