= Rolando Abreu =

Cuban footballer (born 1992)

Personal information
- Full name: Rolando Domingo Abreu Canela
- Date of birth: 15 May 1992 (age 34)
- Place of birth: Santiago de Cuba, Cuba
- Height: 1.70 m (5 ft 7 in)
- Position: Midfielder

Team information
- Current team: Santiago de Cuba

Senior career*
Years	Team	Apps	(Gls)
2015–	Santiago de Cuba		

International career^{‡}
2018–	Cuba	18	(0)
- * Club domestic league appearances and goals ‡ National team caps and goals as of 11 June 2020

Rolando Domingo Abreu Canela (born 15 May 1992) is a Cuban football player. He plays for Santiago de Cuba.

== International ==
He made his Cuba national football team debut on 22 March 2018 in a friendly against Nicaragua, as a starter.

He was included in his country's 2019 CONCACAF Gold Cup squad.
