= Alex Murray (Australian footballer) =

Australian rules footballer

Personal information
- Full name: Alex Murray
- Born: 26 December 1885
- Died: 12 January 1947 (aged 61)
- Height: 178 cm (5 ft 10 in)
- Weight: 68 kg (150 lb)

Playing career^{1}
| Years | Club | Games (Goals) |
| 1909 | Richmond | 4 (1) |
- ^{1} Playing statistics correct to the end of 1909.

Alex Murray (26 December 1885 – 12 January 1947) was an Australian rules footballer who played for the Richmond Football Club in the Victorian Football League (VFL).
