= Walter Benítez (football manager) =

Cuban football manager

Personal information
- Full name: Walter Manuel Benítez Rosales
- Date of birth: 4 June 1972 (age 54)
- Place of birth: Jiguaní, Granma Province, Cuba
- Height: 1.70 m (5 ft 7 in)

Team information
- Current team: Dominican Republic U-22 (manager)

Senior career*
Years	Team	Apps	(Gls)
1989–2004	Granma		

International career
1988	Cuba U-17		
- Cuba U-23

Managerial career
- 2009–2010: Granma
- 2010–2011: Cuba U-20
- 2012: Granma
- 2012–2015: Cuba
- 2017: Atletico Vega Real
- 2021: Atlantico
- 2021–2022: Dominican Republic U-20
- 2022-2023: Dominican Republic (Interim)
- 2023-: Dominican Republic U-22
- * Club domestic league appearances and goals

Walter Manuel Benítez Rosales (born 4 June 1972) is a Cuban football manager.

== Managerial career ==
Born in Granma Province, he had two spells in charge of the provincial side.

He was appointed to the national team position in November 2012. In December 2012, he won the 2012 Caribbean Cup title with Cuba.

== Honours ==
- Caribbean Cup (1): 2012
