= Jorge Kindelán =

Cuban footballer

Personal information
- Full name: Jorge Alexis Kindelán Cuervo
- Date of birth: 12 April 1986 (age 40)
- Place of birth: Santiago de Cuba, Cuba
- Position: Defender

Team information
- Current team: Santiago de Cuba

Senior career*
Years	Team	Apps	(Gls)
2016–	Santiago de Cuba		

International career^{‡}
2018–	Cuba	8	(0)
- * Club domestic league appearances and goals ‡ National team caps and goals as of 23 June 2019

Jorge Alexis Kindelán Cuervo, known as Jorge Kindelán (born 12 April 1986) is a Cuban football player. He plays for Santiago de Cuba.

== Club career ==
He made his Cuba national football team debut on 15 August 2018 in a friendly against Guatemala.

He was selected for their 2019 CONCACAF Gold Cup squad.
