= Lorenzo Mambrini =

Italian footballer and manager

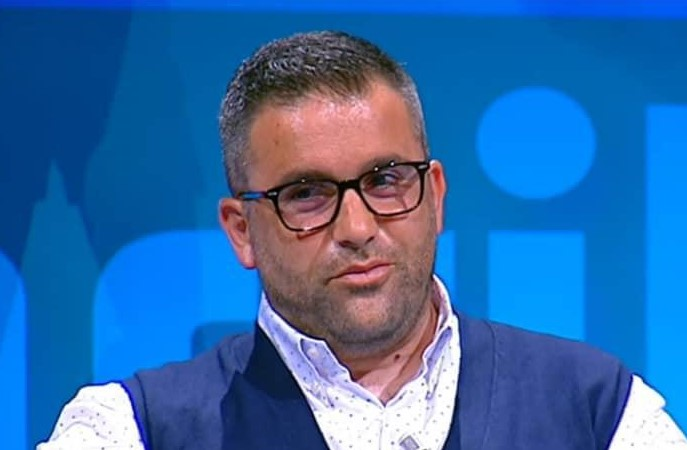
- Italian Footballer and Current UEFA Licensed Football Coach

Personal information
- Date of birth: July 3, 1978 (age 48)
- Place of birth: Città di Castello, Italy
- Position: Midfielder

Senior career*
Years	Team	Apps	(Gls)
1993	Città di Castello A.C		
1994 - 1996	Pisa Sporting Club		
1997 - 1999	Arezzo A.C		
2000	Pianello Calcio F.C		
2001 - 2003	Torgiano A.C		
2004 - 2006	Trestina S.C		
2007 - 2010	Castiglionese A.C		
2011	Valfabbrica A.C		

Managerial career
- 2011-12: San Lorenzo Lerchi DT
- 2012-13: Valfabbrica A.C.
- 2014: Atl. Bogotà Assistant.
- 2015: Santiago de Cuba DT
- 2016: Santiago de Cuba DT
- 2017: Cuba Selection AT
- 2018: F.C. Chacaritas Ecuador DT
- 2019: Ciego de Avila FC
- 2020: Manager Turin FC Tropical Park Miami
- 2021: National Atletico DT of Panama
- 2022: S.D Panama West DT
- 2023: DT FC Guantanamo
- * Club domestic league appearances and goals

Lorenzo Mambrini (born 3 July 1978), nicknamed Mr. Invictus, is an Italian former footballer and current football coach.

== Career ==
=== Sports career ===
- 1993. Città di Castello A.C
- 1994/96. Pisa Sporting Club
- 1997/99. Arezzo A.C
- 2000. Pianello Calcio F.C
- 2001/2003 Torgiano A.C
- 2004/06. Trestina S.C
- 2007/10. Castiglionese A.C
- 2011. Valfabbrica A.C
- Ritiro 2011 San Lorenzo Lerchi

=== Career coach ===
- 2011-12 San Lorenzo Lerchi DT
- 2012-13 Valfabbrica A.C. DT.
- 2014 Atl. Bogotà Assistant.
- 2015 Santiago de Cuba. DT.
- 2016 Santiago de Cuba DT. National Champion Undefeated 1st place DT
- 2017 Cuba Selection . AT Havana Serie B 1st Place DT
- 2018 F.C. Chacaritas Ecuador DT
- 2019 Ciego de Avila FC DT 1st Place Undefeated
- 2020 Manager Turin FC Tropical Park Miami
- 2021 National Atletico DT of Panama
- 2022 S.D Panama West DT
- 2023 DT FC Guantanamo

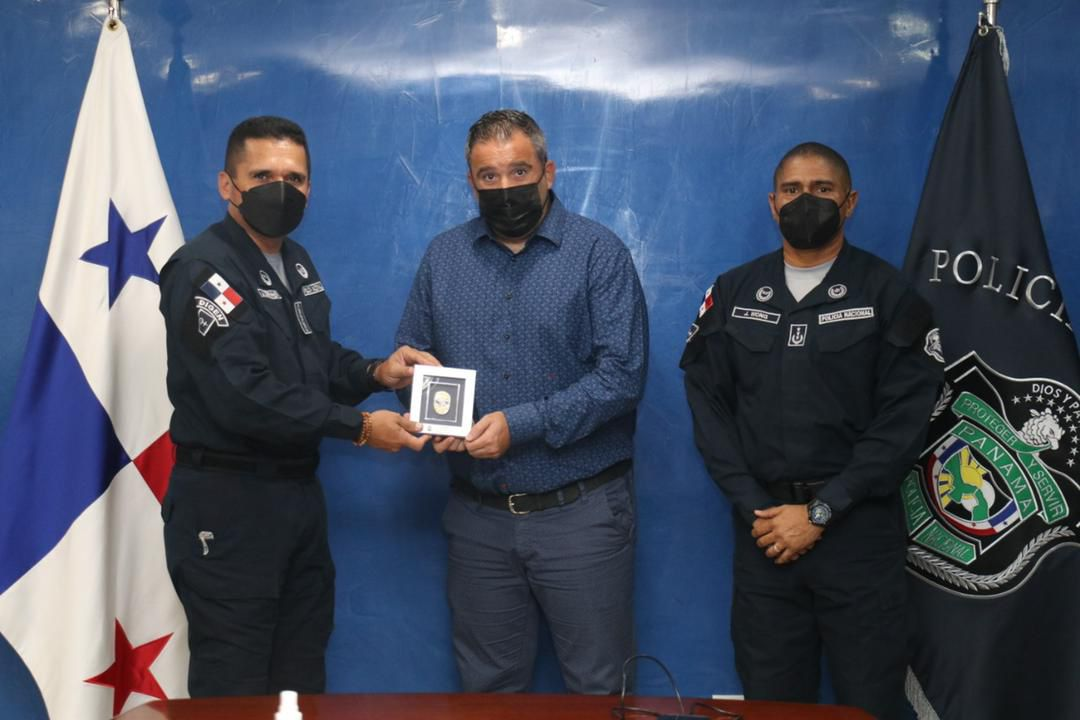
Gold Medal delivered by the nacional police of Panama to Lorenzo Mambrini

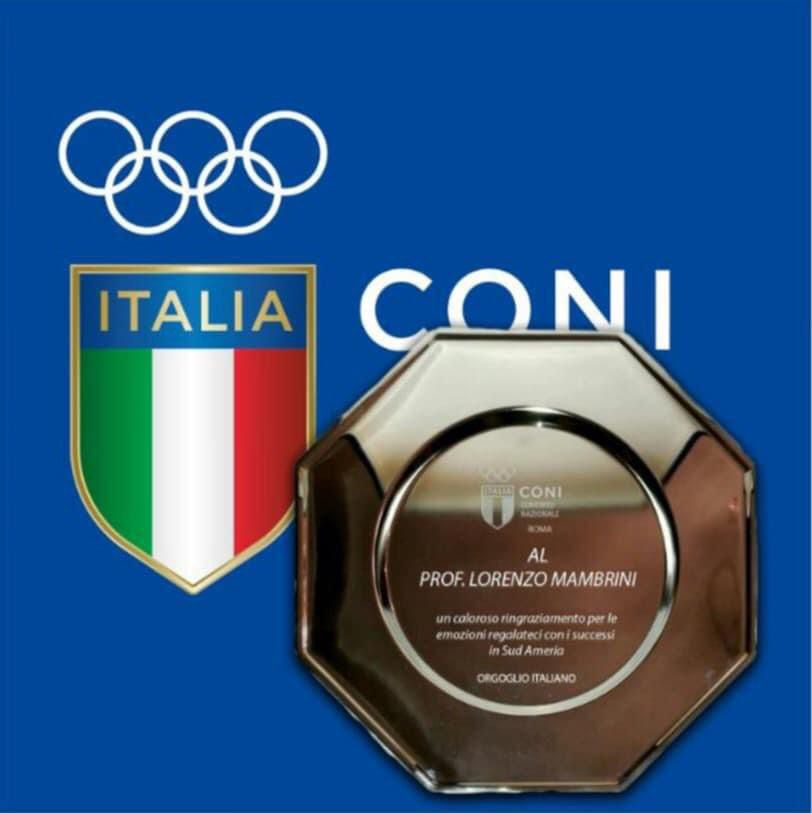
Recognition of the Italian national sports center
