= FC Las Tunas =

Cuban football club

- Full name: Football Club Las Tunas
- Nickname(s): Los Leñadores (The Lumberjacks)
- Founded: 1978; 47 years ago
- Ground: Ovidio Torres; Manatí, Cuba
- Capacity: 2,000
- Manager: Réwal Ochoa
- League: Campeonato Nacional de Fútbol
- 2017: 6th
Home colours

FC Las Tunas is a Cuban football team playing in the Cuban National Football League and representing Las Tunas Province. They play their home games at the Ovidio Torres in Manatí.

== Current squad ==
2018 Season
Note: Flags indicate national team as defined under FIFA eligibility rules; some limited exceptions apply. Players may hold more than one non-FIFA nationality.

No.	Pos.	Nation	Player
—	GK	(Cuba) CUB	Omar Ferrales
—	GK	(Cuba) CUB	José Yasmany Martínez
—	GK	(Cuba) CUB	Sandy Sánchez
—	GK	(Cuba) CUB	Carlos Torres Tamayo
—	DF	(Cuba) CUB	Yubier Agüero
—	DF	(Cuba) CUB	Dayan Cortiña
—	DF	(Cuba) CUB	Sandro Cutiño
—	DF	(Cuba) CUB	Miguel García Cardoso
—	DF	(Cuba) CUB	Andres Ledesma
—	DF	(Cuba) CUB	Alejandro Evelio Osorio
—	DF	(Cuba) CUB	Leandro Pérez Salas
—	DF	(Cuba) CUB	Dario Ramos
—	DF	(Cuba) CUB	Mainard Rivero
—	DF	(Cuba) CUB	Héctor Rondón Chowing
—	DF	(Cuba) CUB	Leby Torres

No.	Pos.	Nation	Player
—	MF	(Cuba) CUB	Jaisel Badell
—	MF	(Cuba) CUB	Eduardo Carmenate
—	MF	(Cuba) CUB	Sajay Herrera
—	MF	(Cuba) CUB	Nelson Maikol Pérez
—	MF	(Cuba) CUB	Luis Alberto Ramírez González
—	MF	(Cuba) CUB	Liusmel Vazquez
—	FW	(Cuba) CUB	Juan Manuel Andreus
—	FW	(Cuba) CUB	Geovany Ayala Baldonado
—	FW	(Cuba) CUB	Yosvany Márquez
—	FW	(Cuba) CUB	Jorge Yandy Nuñez
—	FW	(Cuba) CUB	Eder Prada
—	FW	(Cuba) CUB	Israel Quezada
—	FW	(Cuba) CUB	Yorlandry Tamayo
—	FW	(Peru) PER	Luis César Valcarcel
