= Dutherson Clerveaux =

Haitian footballer (born 1999)

Personal information
- Date of birth: 20 January 1999 (age 27)
- Place of birth: Léogâne, Haiti
- Height: 1.70 m (5 ft 7 in)
- Position: Midfielder

Team information
- Current team: Cavaly

Senior career*
Years	Team	Apps	(Gls)
2016–2017	Valencia Léogâne		
2017–	Cavaly		

International career^{‡}
2018	Haiti U20	3	(0)
2019–2021	Haiti U23	3	(0)
2019–	Haiti	3	(0)
- * Club domestic league appearances and goals as of 03:44, 6 July 2021 (UTC) ‡ National team caps and goals as of 03:44, 6 July 2021 (UTC)

Dutherson Clerveaux (born 20 January 1999) is a Haitian professional footballer who plays as a midfielder for the club Cavaly, and the Haiti national team.

== International career ==
Clerveaux debuted with the Haiti national team in a 3–1 friendly win over Guyana on 11 June 2019. He was called up to represent Haiti at the 2021 CONCACAF Gold Cup.
