= Chikosi Basden =

Bermudian footballer

Personal information
- Full name: Chikosi Basden
- Date of birth: 1 February 1995 (age 31)
- Place of birth: Bermuda
- Position: Right-back

Team information
- Current team: Redbridge

Youth career
- 2011–2012: Stoke City
- 2012–2016: Enfield Town

Senior career*
Years	Team	Apps	(Gls)
2016–2017	Chesterfield		
2018	Hertford Town	4	(0)
2018	Cockfosters	1	(0)
2018–2019	Hatfield Town	7	(2)
2019–	London Colney	8	(0)
2020–	Redbridge		

International career^{‡}
2012	Bermuda U20	1	(0)
2019–	Bermuda	3	(0)
- * Club domestic league appearances and goals as of 10:52, 29 March 2020 (UTC) ‡ National team caps and goals as of 21 June 2019

Chikosi Basden (born 1 February 1995), sometimes known as Kosi Basden, is a Bermudian professional footballer who plays as a right-back for Redbridge and the Bermuda national football team

== Club career ==
Basden moved to England from Bermuda at the age of 15, an began playing football in the academy of Stoke City. He had brief spells in the lower divisions of England with Enfield Town and Chesterfield. After playing for Hertford Town and Cockfosters, Basden signed for Hatfield Town in November 2018. He played for London Colney during the 2019–20 season.

== International career ==
Basden made his senior debut with the Bermuda national football team in a 2–2 friendly tie with Cuba on 22 February 2019.
