= Alex Murray (footballer, born 1992) =

Guyanese footballer

Personal information
- Full name: Alex Andrew Murray
- Date of birth: 21 October 1992 (age 34)
- Place of birth: Georgetown, Guyana
- Height: 1.83 m (6 ft 0 in)
- Position: Goalkeeper

Team information
- Current team: Morvant Caledonia United

Senior career*
Years	Team	Apps	(Gls)
2012–2018	Alpha United		
2018–2019	Georgetown		
2019	Santos	9	
2019–	Morvant Caledonia United		

International career^{‡}
2016–	Guyana	4	(0)
- * Club domestic league appearances and goals as of 21 June 2020 ‡ National team caps and goals as of 21 June 2020

Alex Andrew Murray (born 21 October 1992) is a Guyanese footballer who plays as a goalkeeper for Morvant Caledonia United and the Guyana national football team.

== Career ==
=== International ===
Murray made his senior international debut on 21 February 2016, keeping a clean sheet in a 2-0 friendly victory over Suriname. Murray was included in Guyana's squad for the 2019 Gold Cup, but he failed to make an appearance.

== Career statistics ==
=== International ===
As of matches played 7 June 2019.

National team	Year	Apps	Goals
Guyana	2016	2	0
Guyana	2019	2	0
Total		4	0
