= Agenor Báez =

Nicaraguan footballer

Personal information
- Full name: Agenor de Jesús Báez Cano
- Date of birth: 18 December 1997 (age 28)
- Place of birth: Somoto, Nicaragua
- Height: 1.75 m (5 ft 9 in)
- Position: Midfielder

Team information
- Current team: Managua

Youth career
- Real Madriz

Senior career*
Years	Team	Apps	(Gls)
–2017	Real Madriz	42	(2)
2017–	Managua	115	(17)

International career
2017–	Nicaragua	2	(0)
- * Club domestic league appearances and goals

Agenor de Jesús Báez Cano (born 18 December 1997) is a Nicaraguan footballer who plays as a midfielder for Managua and the Nicaragua national team.

== Career ==
He is from Somoto.

Báez started his career with Nicaraguan side Real Madriz.

In 2019, he trialed for a club in the Maltese second division.

In 2017, he signed for Managua. He renewed his contract with the team in 2020.
