= Yordan Thimon =

Martiniquais footballer (born 1996)

Personal information
- Full name: Yordan Louis Olivier Thimon
- Date of birth: 10 September 1996 (age 30)
- Place of birth: Les Abymes, Guadeloupe
- Position: Defender

Team information
- Current team: Club Franciscain

Senior career*
Years	Team	Apps	(Gls)
2014–	Club Franciscain		

International career^{‡}
2017–	Martinique	6	(0)
- * Club domestic league appearances and goals ‡ National team caps and goals as of 19 June 2019

Yordan Louis Olivier Thimon (born 10 September 1996) is a professional footballer who plays as a defender for Club Franciscain. Born in Guadeloupe, he plays for the Martinique national team.

== International ==
He made his Martinique regional football team debut on 29 March 2017 in a friendly against Guyana.

He was selected for the 2019 CONCACAF Gold Cup squad.

== Personal life ==
Yordan is the brother of the Yann Thimon, who is also an Martinique international footballer.
