= Arnaud Huyghues des Etages =

Martiniquais footballer (born 1985)

Personal information
- Full name: Arnaud Émile Benoît Huygues des Etages
- Date of birth: 30 December 1985 (age 40)
- Place of birth: Fort-de-France, Martinique
- Height: 1.80 m (5 ft 11 in)
- Position: Goalkeeper

Team information
- Current team: Aiglon du Lamentin

Senior career*
Years	Team	Apps	(Gls)
2016–2017	Golden Star		
2017–2018	Rivière-Pilote		
2018–	Aiglon du Lamentin		

International career^{‡}
2019–2021	Martinique	2	(0)
- * Club domestic league appearances and goals as of 03:44, 6 July 2021 (UTC) ‡ National team caps and goals as of 03:44, 18 July 2021 (UTC)

Arnaud Émile Benoît Huygues des Etages (born 30 December 1985) is a Martiniquais professional footballer who plays as a goalkeeper for the club Aiglon du Lamentin, and the Martinique national team.

== International career ==
Huygues des Etages debuted with the Martinique national team in a 1–0 CONCACAF Nations League loss to Honduras on 13 October 2019. He was called up to represent Martinique at the 2021 CONCACAF Gold Cup.
