= Manatí, Cuba =

Manatí
- Municipality
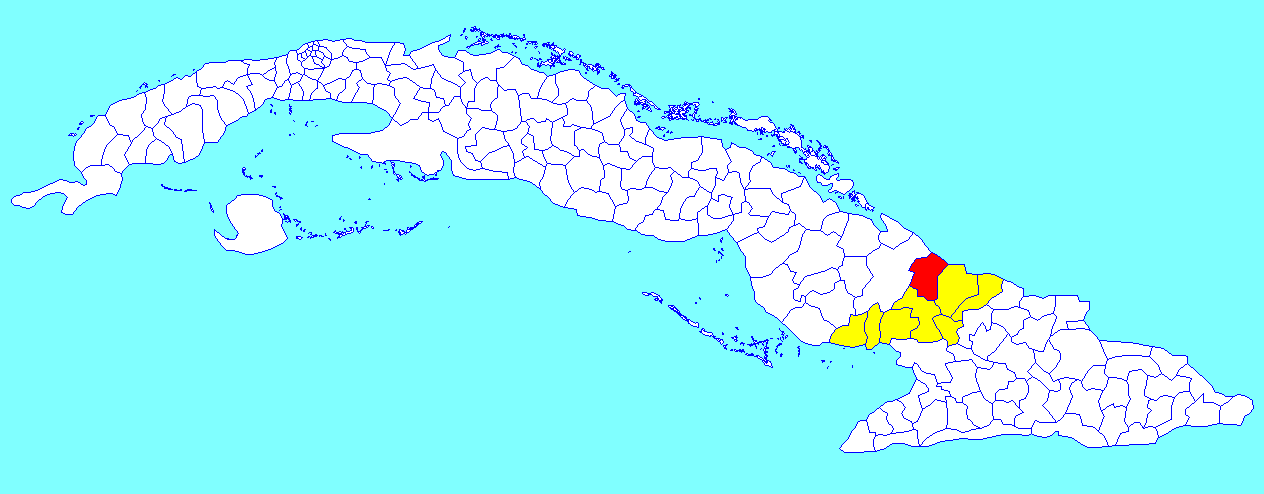
- Manatí municipality (red) within Las Tunas Province (yellow) and Cuba
- Coordinates: 21°18′52″N 76°56′16″W
- Country: Cuba
- Province: Las Tunas

Area
  - Total: 953 km^{2} (368 sq mi)
- Elevation: 5 m (16 ft)

Population (2004)
  - Total: 33,573
  - Density: 35.2/km^{2} (91/sq mi)
- Time zone: UTC-5 (EST)
- Area code: +53-31
- Climate: Aw
- Website: https://www.manati.gob.cu/

Manatí is a municipality and town in the Las Tunas Province of Cuba. It is located in the north-western part of the province, on the northern coast of Cuba, in the Manati Bay.

== Demographics ==
In 2004, the municipality of Manatí had a population of 33,573. With a total area of 953 km^{2} (368 sq mi), it has a population density of 35.2/km^{2} (91/sq mi).

== See also ==
- Municipalities of Cuba
- List of cities in Cuba
