= FC Isla de La Juventud =

Cuban football club

FC Isla de la Juventud
- Full name: Isla de La Juventud
- Nickname: Los Isleños (The islanders)
- Ground: Estadio El Rodeo de Nueva Gerona; Nueva Gerona, Cuba
- Capacity: 2,000
- Manager: (Cuba) Osmel Morán
- League: Campeonato Nacional de Fútbol
Home colours	Away colours

Isla de La Juventud is a Cuban football team playing in the Cuban National Football League and representing Isla de la Juventud Municipality. They play their home games at El Rodeo in Nueva Gerona.

== Current squad ==
2018 Season
Note: Flags indicate national team as defined under FIFA eligibility rules; some limited exceptions apply. Players may hold more than one non-FIFA nationality.

No.	Pos.	Nation	Player
—	GK	CUB	Joan Cantero
—	GK	PER	Ernesto Pantoja
—	GK	CUB	Reynier Ramos
—	GK	CUB	Karel Soto
—	DF	CUB	Yusniel Blanco
—	DF	CUB	Yordanys Bruzón
—	DF	CUB	Ichiro Cruz
—	DF	CUB	Néstor Fiss
—	DF	CUB	Yoendry Fiss
—	DF	CUB	Lázaro Hernández
—	DF	CUB	Michel Márquez
—	DF	CUB	Denis Núñez
—	DF	CUB	Elvis Pina
—	DF	CUB	Wilden Piñero
—	DF	CUB	Alexei Pupo
—	MF	CUB	Felipe Abril
—	MF	CUB	Andy Luis Donatien

No.	Pos.	Nation	Player
—	MF	CUB	Daniel Elias
—	MF	CUB	Fidel Espinosa
—	MF	CUB	Neoveidis Fuentes
—	MF	CUB	Luis Orlando López
—	MF	CUB	Ulises Machado
—	MF	CUB	Luis Paradela
—	MF	CUB	Humberto Perera
—	MF	CUB	Miguel Portal
—	MF	CUB	Fabio Rodríguez
—	MF	CUB	Miguel Ángel Sánchez
—	MF	CUB	Jesús Silva Martínez
—	MF	CUB	Edilberto Tamayo
—	MF	CUB	Ronald Tatún
—	MF	CUB	Hair Zayas
—	FW	CUB	Carlos Rafael Amore
—	FW	CUB	Roberto Hernández Martínez
—	FW	CUB	Yoandir Puga
