= CF Granma =

Cuban football club

- Full name: Club de Futbol de Granma
- Nickname: Los Incansables (The Tireless)
- Ground: Estadio Ramón Gómez Silvera; Jiguaní, Cuba; Estadio Conrado Benítez; Jiguaní, Cuba
- Capacity: 2,000
- Manager: Ramón Marrero
- League: Campeonato Nacional de Fútbol
Home colours	Away colours

CF Granma is a Cuban football team playing in the Cuban National Football League and representing Granma Province. They play their home games at the Estadio Mártires de Barbados in Bayamo or at the Conrado Benítez in Jiguaní.

== History ==
Nicknamed Los Incansables, the team never won the national league title, but was runner-up in 2002.

== Current squad ==
2018 Season
Note: Flags indicate national team as defined under FIFA eligibility rules; some limited exceptions apply. Players may hold more than one non-FIFA nationality.

No.	Pos.	Nation	Player
18	FW	CUB	Rúslan Batista (captain)
—	GK	CUB	Omar Cardoso
—	GK	CUB	Rangel Castillo
—	GK	CUB	Andres Sánchez
—	DF	CUB	Maikel Capote
—	DF	CUB	Yoandris Dieguez
—	DF	CUB	Ivan Flores
—	DF	CUB	Carlos Labrada
—	DF	CUB	Ulices Matos
—	DF	CUB	Manuel Moreno
—	DF	CUB	Leodanis Rodríguez
—	DF	CUB	Josué Rosabal
—	DF	CUB	Yennier Rosabal
—	DF	CUB	Rance Jorge Sariol
—	MF	CUB	Lázaro Fonseca

No.	Pos.	Nation	Player
—	MF	CUB	Félix Guerra
—	MF	CUB	Alejandro Marrero
—	MF	CUB	Humberto Puig
—	MF	CUB	Julio Enrique Quesada
—	MF	CUB	Dennis Ramírez
—	MF	CUB	Yoel Sierra
—	FW	CUB	Yoel Aguilera
—	FW	CUB	Luís Miguel Carrera
—	FW	CUB	Henry Márquez
—	FW	CUB	Adonis Ramos Soler
—	FW	CUB	Andi Sosa
—	FW	CUB	Hector Gonzáles
—	FW	CUB	Julio Daniel Rodríguez

== Historical list of coaches ==
- (Cuba) Walter Benítez (2009–2010)
- (Cuba) Manuel Castillo (2011-2012)
- (Cuba) Walter Benítez (2012)
- (Cuba) Ramón Marrero (2013-
