= List of Cuban football players who have defected to the United States =

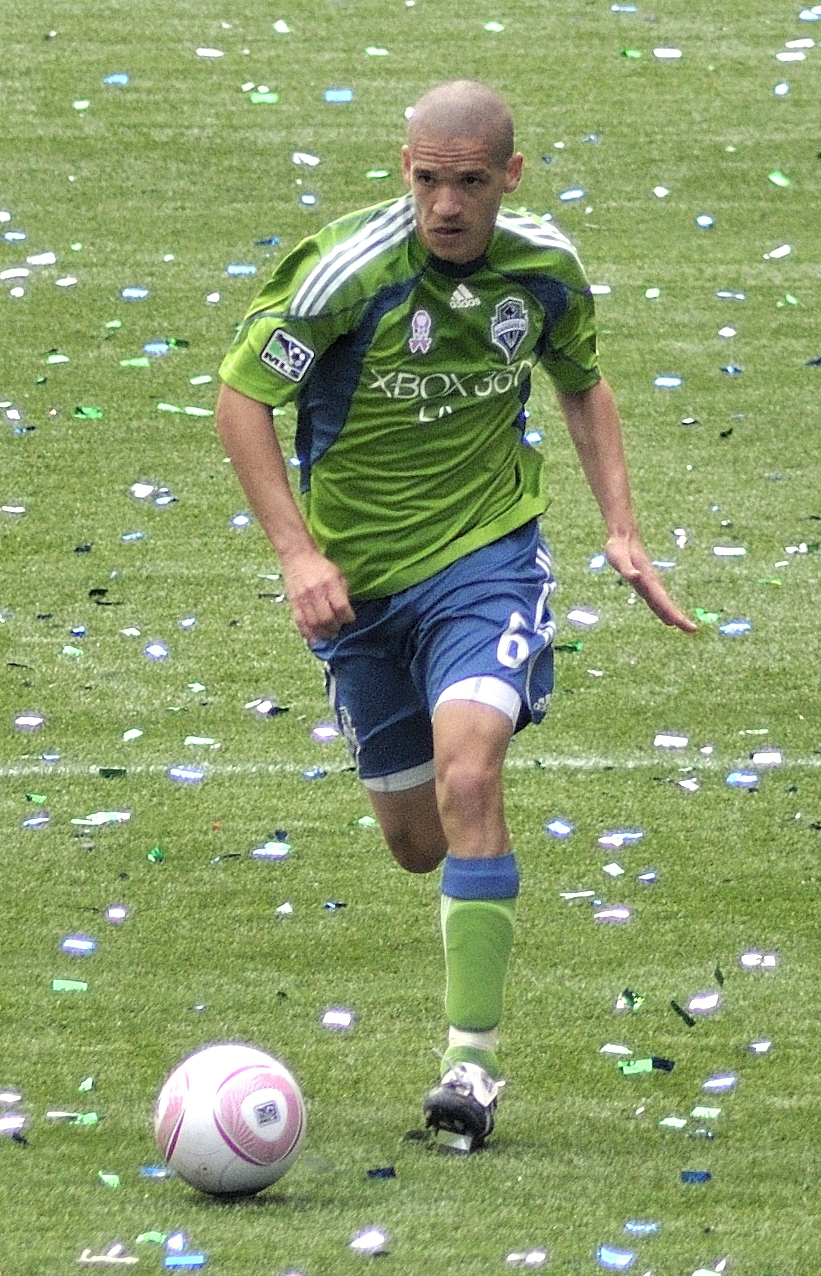
Osvaldo Alonso defected from Cuba in 2007 to pursue a professional football career.

Since 1970, 56 Cuban football players have defected to the United States in an attempt to further their professional career or improve their standard of living.

Under the old wet feet, dry feet policy in the U.S., any Cuban player who set foot in the country was entitled to become a U.S. resident. Maykel Galindo, one of the earlier defectors told of the incentives to leave Cuba: "They leave Cuba because they want to make something out of their lives. They are in search of the dream of playing football at a professional level and they know that Cuba will not offer them that. They do it because they feel that their family will be proud of them if they make it to the professional level and many of those players have realized that they can achieve that goal. Thankfully, in my case, doors were being opened to me." The wet feet, dry feet policy ended in January 2017.

As a general rule, Cuban players who defect are not allowed to rejoin the Cuba national team for international matches. Players who defect are generally ineligible to play for the United States team, as FIFA eligibility rules only allow a player to play for one national team during his career.

== List ==
=== 1970 ===
Rafael Argüelles defected to the U.S. during the 1970 Central American and Caribbean Games football tournament held in Panama. Following illness and an expected early leave, he instead took the opportunity to seek asylum at the Nicaraguan embassy and through there, went for Miami.

- Rafael Argüelles (defender, aged 24, from FC La Habana)

=== 1999 ===
Rodney Valdes defected to the U.S. during the 1999 Pan-American Games football tournament in Winnipeg, Canada.

- Rodney Valdes (goalkeeper) - Cuban U23 international

=== 2002 ===
Rey Ángel Martínez and Alberto Delgado defected during the 2002 CONCACAF Gold Cup. They told Cuba national football team minders that they were going to make a phone call in the hotel lobby but ran out of the hotel and traveled in a taxi to Martinez's uncle.

- Rey Ángel Martínez
- Alberto Delgado

=== 2005 ===
Cuban international forward Maykel Galindo sought to stay in the U.S. after he had arrived in the country with the Cuba national team for the 2005 CONCACAF Gold Cup.

- Maykel Galindo

=== 2007 ===
Inspired by Galindo, two players defected at the following Gold Cup, two years later.

- Osvaldo Alonso
- Lester Moré

=== 2008 ===
Several Cuban youth players defected in 2008 following an Olympic qualifier hosted in the U.S.

- Yeniel Bermúdez - Cuban U23 international
- José Miranda (goalkeeper) - Cuban U23 international
- Erlys García - Cuban U23 international
- Yordany Álvarez (midfielder) - Cuban U23 international
- Loanny Cartaya (defender) - Cuban U23 international
- Yendry Diaz - Cuban U23 international
- Eder Roldán - Cuban U23 international

=== 2010 ===
Two players defected during a 2010 World Cup qualifier.

- Pedro Faife
- Reynier Alcántara

=== 2011 ===
Yosniel Mesa defected during the 2011 CONCACAF Gold Cup

- Yosniel Mesa - Cuban international

=== 2012 ===
Yosmel de Armas defected in 2012 during Cuba's qualifying campaign for the 2012 Olympics.

- Yosmel de Armas Cuban U23 international (he signed for Laredo Heat in 2013 )

Prior to a World Cup qualifying game against Canada in Toronto, four players and the team's psychologist Ignacio Abreu Sánchez defected to the U.S. Cuba were not able to name any substitutes due to the defections.

- Reysander Fernández (midfielder from Ciego de Ávila)
- Heviel Cordovés (forward, aged 23 from Havana)
- Maikel Chang (forward, aged 21 from Havana)
- Odisnel Cooper (goalkeeper, aged 20 from Camagüey)

Two players defected during the 2012 CONCACAF Women's Olympic Qualifying Tournament which was hosted in Vancouver, Canada.

- Yezenia Gallardo (forward, aged 20)
- Yisel Rodríguez (midfielder, aged 22)

=== 2015 ===
Four players defected during the 2015 CONCACAF Gold Cup.

- Keyler García (forward, aged 25 from FC Camagüey)
- Arael Argüelles (goalkeeper, aged 28 from FC Cienfuegos)
- Darío Suárez (midfielder, aged 22 from FC La Habana)
- Ariel Martínez (midfielder, aged 29 from FC Sancti Spíritus)

Another six defected during the 2015 CONCACAF Men's Olympic Qualifying Championship:

- Emmanuel Labrada (midfielder, aged 21 from CF Granma)
- Dairon Pérez (midfielder, aged 20 from FC La Habana)
- Frank López (forward, aged 20 from FC Cienfuegos)
- Yendry Torres (defender, aged 19 from FC Cienfuegos)
- Brian Rosales (defender, aged 20 from FC Matanzas)
- Pedro Anderson (midfielder, aged 21 from FC Pinar del Río)

One player defected during a personal visit:

- Jorge Corrales (defender, aged 24, from FC Pinar del Río)

One player defected having visited Mexico:

- Héctor Morales (attacker, aged 21 from FC La Habana)
- Jonathan Moliner (defender, aged 19 from FC Cienfuegos) also defected.

=== 2018 ===
Twelve players defected following the 2018 CONCACAF U-20 Championship which was hosted in Bradenton, Florida.

- Arturo Hector Godoy
- Bruno Rendón (defender, aged 18)
- Christopher Yoel Llorente Fernandez
- Danny Echeverria Diaz
- Frank Leidam Nodarse Chavez
- Geobel Pérez
- Josue Vega Alvarez
- Juan Manuel Andreus Milanes
- Omar Perez Ramirez
- Omar Proenza Calderon
- Rivaldo Ibarra Thompson
- Rolando Aldahir Oviendo Valdez
- Yandri Romero Clark

Two players defected during the 2018 CONCACAF Women's Championship which was hosted in Edinburg, Texas.

- Francis Riquelme (forward, aged 20)

=== 2019 ===
Four players defected during the 2019 CONCACAF Gold Cup.

The following player defected after the match against Mexico

- Yasmany López (defender, aged 31 from Ciego de Ávila)

The following players defected after the match against Martinique

- Luismel Morris (midfielder, aged 21 from FC Camagüey)
- Reynaldo Pérez (midfielder, aged 25 from Delfines del Este FC, Dominican Republic)
- Daniel Luis Sáez (midfielder, aged 25 from Delfines del Este FC, Dominican Republic)

=== 2023 ===
Five players defected during the 2023 CONCACAF Gold Cup.

The following players defected after the first group stage match against Guatemala:

- Roberney Caballero (midfielder, aged 27, from FC La Habana)
- Denilson Milanés (midfielder, aged 20, from Desamparados, Costa Rica)
- Neisser Sandó (midfielder, aged 24, from FC Cienfuegos)
- Jassael Herrera (defender, aged 20, from FC Cienfuegos)

The following player defected after the last group stage match against Canada:

- Sandy Sánchez (goalkeeper, aged 29, from Atlético Pantoja, Dominican Republic)

== See also ==
- List of baseball players who defected from Cuba
