= 2019–20 Liga Nacional de Cuba =

Liga Nacional de Cuba
- Season: 2019–20
- Dates: 9 November 2019 – 15 March 2020 (Note: The season was scheduled to begin on 9 November 2019 and conclude on 2 May 2020.)
- Champions: Apertura: Pinar del Río; Clausura: not awarded
- Caribbean Club Shield: Pinar del Río

The 2019–20 Liga Nacional de Fútbol de Cuba was the 109th season of the Campeonato Nacional de Fútbol de Cuba, the top division football competition in Cuba. The season was broken into an Apertura and Clausura season, similar to competitions in much of Central America. The Apertura season began on 9 November 2019 and concluded on 21 December 2019. The Clausura season began on 25 January 2020 and was scheduled to conclude on 2 May 2020. On 15 March 2020, the competition was suspended due to concerns surrounding the worldwide COVID-19 pandemic.

The competition was originally scheduled to restart on 30 April 2020, but was ultimately cancelled on 23 June 2020. No Clausura champion was awarded.

== Apertura ==
=== Group A (Occidental) ===
Pos	Team	Pld	W	D	L	GF	GA	GD	Pts	Qualification or relegation
1	Pinar del Río	7	5	1	1	12	3	+9	16	Advance to Clausura
2	Villa Clara	7	5	0	2	13	4	+9	15	Advance to Clausura
3	Matanzas	6	4	0	2	10	7	+3	12	Advance to Clausura
4	Artemisa	7	3	2	2	11	6	+5	11	Advance to Clausura
5	La Habana	6	2	3	1	9	7	+2	9	Advance to Clausura
6	Cienfuegos	7	3	0	4	9	12	−3	9	
7	Isla de La Juventud	7	0	2	5	1	9	−8	2	
8	Mayabeque	7	0	2	5	2	19	−17	2	

Source: Soccerway

=== Group B (Oriental) ===
Pos	Team	Pld	W	D	L	GF	GA	GD	Pts	Qualification or relegation
1	Ciego de Ávila	7	7	0	0	18	2	+16	21	Advance to Clausura
2	Las Tunas	7	3	2	2	11	7	+4	11	Advance to Clausura
3	Santiago de Cuba	7	3	2	2	7	5	+2	11	Advance to Clausura
4	Granma	7	2	3	2	7	7	0	9	Advance to Clausura
5	Camagüey	7	1	5	1	9	7	+2	8	
6	Guantánamo	7	1	4	2	10	9	+1	7	
7	Holguín	7	1	2	4	5	12	−7	5	
8	Sancti Spíritus	7	0	2	5	2	20	−18	2	

Source: Soccerway

=== Apertura Final ===
21 December 2019 Apertura Final	FC Ciego de Ávila	2–2 (3–4 p)	FC Pinar del Río
	Núñez; Fernández	Report	Soriano; Rodríguez
	Penalties
	Penalty scored Penalty missed		(penalty scored) (penalty scored) (penalty missed) (penalty scored); (penalty scored) Reyes

== Clausura ==
Pos	Team	Pld	W	D	L	GF	GA	GD	Pts
1	Ciego de Ávila	8	6	2	0	16	4	+12	20
2	Villa Clara	8	5	0	3	13	6	+7	15
3	Santiago de Cuba	8	3	5	0	9	5	+4	14
4	Matanzas	8	4	2	2	12	10	+2	14
5	Artemisa	8	3	3	2	13	14	−1	12
6	La Habana	8	2	3	3	17	16	+1	9
7	Cuba	8	3	0	5	12	16	−4	9
8	Granma	8	1	3	4	6	12	−6	6

=== Playoffs ===
The playoffs were cancelled due to the COVID-19 pandemic.
