= List of football clubs in Cuba =

Clubs in Cuba, including from top level to the lowest levels:

== La Habana Province ==
- FC Ciudad de La Habana
- FC La Habana
- FC Industriales

== Isla de la Juventud ==
- FC Isla de La Juventud

== Pinar del Río Province ==
- FC Pinar del Río

== Cienfuegos Province ==
- FC Cienfuegos

== Matanzas Province ==
- FC Matanzas
- Real Matanzas

== Villa Clara Province ==
=== National ===
- FC Villa Clara
  - FC Villa Clara Women's

=== Liga Santa Clara ===
- Palencia CF Academy, Santa Clara

=== Other ===
- Unión Deportiva del Undoso, Mártires del 9 de abril stadium, Sagua la Grade
- Club Deportivo Zulueta, Zulueta

== Camagüey Province ==
- FC Camagüey

== Ciego de Ávila Province ==
- FC Ciego de Ávila

== Las Tunas Province ==
- FC Las Tunas

== Sancti Spíritus Province ==
- FC Sancti Spíritus

== Granma Province ==
- CF Granma

== Guantánamo Province ==
- FC Guantánamo

== Holguín Province ==
- FC Holguín

== Santiago de Cuba Province ==
- FC Santiago de Cuba

== Mayabeque Province ==
- FC Mayabeque
