= 2008 CONCACAF Men's Olympic Qualifying squads =

The 2008 CONCACAF Men's Olympic Qualifying was an international football tournament that was held in the United States from 11 and 23 March 2008. The eight national teams involved in the tournament were required to register a squad of twenty players, two of whom had to be goalkeepers.

The final lists were published by CONCACAF on 10 and 11 March 2008.

The age listed for each player is on 11 March 2008, the first day of the tournament. A flag is included for coaches who are of a different nationality than their own national team. Players marked in bold have been capped at full international level.

== Group A ==
=== Cuba ===
| No. | Pos. | Player | Date of birth (age) | Caps | Goals | Club |
|---|---|---|---|---|---|---|
| | GK | José Manuel Miranda | | | | (Football Association of Cuba) Matanzas |
| | GK | Arael Argüellez | April 30, 1987 (aged 20) | | | (Football Association of Cuba) Cienfuegos |
| | DF | Erlys Garcia Baró | | | | (Football Association of Cuba) Ciudad de La Habana |
| | DF | Yenier Bermúdez | | | | (Football Association of Cuba) Cienfuegos |
| | DF | Raicel Mazquia Pozo | | | | (Football Association of Cuba) Pinar del Río |
| | DF | Yendry Diaz | | | | (Football Association of Cuba) Matanzas |
| | DF | Juan Carlos Martínez | | | | (Football Association of Cuba) Villa Clara |
| | DF | Loanni Cartaya Prieto | | | | (Football Association of Cuba) Ciudad de La Habana |
| | MF | Alianni Urgelles | | | | (Football Association of Cuba) Guantánamo |
| | MF | Liván Vasconcelos | | | | (Football Association of Cuba) Matanzas |
| | MF | Francisco Alexei Carrazana | | | | (Football Association of Cuba) Cienfuegos |
| | MF | Yordany Álvarez | | | | (Football Association of Cuba) Cienfuegos |
| | MF | Enrique Villaurrutia | | | | (Football Association of Cuba) Cienfuegos |
| | MF | Eder Roldán | | | | (Football Association of Cuba) Ciudad de La Habana |
| | MF | Armando Coroneaux | | | | (Football Association of Cuba) Camagüey |
| | FW | Roberto Linares | | | | (Football Association of Cuba) Villa Clara |
| | FW | Yasnier Rosales | | | | (Football Association of Cuba) Granma |
| | FW | Leonel Duarte | | | | (Football Association of Cuba) Ciego de Ávila |

=== Honduras ===
| No. | Pos. | Player | Date of birth (age) | Caps | Goals | Club |
|---|---|---|---|---|---|---|
| 1 | GK | Kevin Hernández | 21 December 1985 (aged 22) | | | (National Autonomous Federation of Football of Honduras) Victoria |
| 2 | DF | Quiarol Arzú | 3 March 1985 (aged 23) | | | (National Autonomous Federation of Football of Honduras) Platense |
| 3 | DF | David Molina | 14 March 1988 (aged 19) | | | (National Autonomous Federation of Football of Honduras) Motagua |
| 5 | DF | Erick Norales | 11 February 1985 (aged 23) | | | (National Autonomous Federation of Football of Honduras) Marathón |
| 6 | MF | Luis López | 29 August 1986 (aged 21) | | | (National Autonomous Federation of Football of Honduras) Marathón |
| 7 | FW | Rigoberto Padilla | 1 December 1985 (aged 22) | | | (National Autonomous Federation of Football of Honduras) Hispano |
| 8 | DF | Irvin Reyna | 7 June 1987 (aged 20) | | | (National Autonomous Federation of Football of Honduras) Olimpia |
| 9 | FW | Jefferson Bernárdez | 27 March 1987 (aged 20) | | | (National Autonomous Federation of Football of Honduras) Motagua |
| 10 | MF | Ramón Núñez | 14 November 1985 (aged 22) | | | (National Autonomous Federation of Football of Honduras) Olimpia |
| 12 | GK | Obed Enamorado | 15 September 1985 (aged 22) | | | (National Autonomous Federation of Football of Honduras) Vida |
| 13 | DF | Vicente Solórzano | 27 September 1988 (aged 19) | | | (National Autonomous Federation of Football of Honduras) Deportes Savio |
| 14 | DF | Misael Ruiz | 20 December 1986 (aged 21) | | | (National Autonomous Federation of Football of Honduras) Platense |
| 15 | MF | Mario Martínez | 30 July 1989 (aged 18) | | | (National Autonomous Federation of Football of Honduras) Real España |
| 16 | MF | Marvin Sánchez | 2 November 1986 (aged 21) | | | (National Autonomous Federation of Football of Honduras) Platense |
| 17 | MF | David Álvarez | 5 December 1985 (aged 22) | | | (National Autonomous Federation of Football of Honduras) Marathón |
| 18 | FW | José Güity | 19 May 1985 (aged 22) | | | (National Autonomous Federation of Football of Honduras) Marathón |
| 20 | MF | Hendry Thomas | 23 February 1985 (aged 23) | | | (National Autonomous Federation of Football of Honduras) Olimpia |
| 21 | MF | Óscar Morales | 12 May 1986 (aged 21) | | | (National Autonomous Federation of Football of Honduras) Real España |
| 22 | GK | Levon Smith | 3 August 1985 (aged 22) | | | (National Autonomous Federation of Football of Honduras) Arsenal |
| 24 | FW | Georgie Welcome | 9 March 1985 (aged 23) | | | (National Autonomous Federation of Football of Honduras) Arsenal |

=== Panama ===
The roster for the Panamanian team was as follows.

| No. | Pos. | Player | Date of birth (age) | Caps | Goals | Club |
|---|---|---|---|---|---|---|
| | GK | José Calderón | August 14, 1985 (aged 22) | | | (Panamanian Football Federation) Chepo F.C. |
| | GK | Gilmar Torres | November 11, 1985 (aged 22) | | | (Panamanian Football Federation) Alianza |
| | GK | Guillermo Murillo | November 4, 1987 (aged 20) | | | (Panamanian Football Federation) Chepo F.C. |
| | DF | Román Torres | March 20, 1986 (aged 21) | | | (Colombian Football Federation) La Equidad |
| | DF | Carlos Rodriguez* | December 4, 1990 (aged 17) | | | (Uruguayan Football Association) Defensor Sporting |
| | DF | Eric Vasquez | January 8, 1988 (aged 20) | | | (Panamanian Football Federation) Chorillo |
| | DF | Reinaldo Anderson | April 12, 1986 (aged 21) | | | (Panamanian Football Federation) Arabe Unido |
| | DF | Adolfo Machado | February 14, 1985 (aged 23) | | | (Panamanian Football Federation) Alianza |
| | DF | Rolando Algandona | April 12, 1989 (aged 18) | | | (Panamanian Football Federation) San Francisco F.C. |
| | DF | Jean Carlos Cedeño | September 7, 1985 (aged 22) | | | (Panamanian Football Federation) Chorrillo |
| | MF | Nelson Barahona | November 22, 1987 (aged 20) | | | (Uruguayan Football Association) Centro Atlético Fénix |
| | MF | Eduardo Jiménez | February 4, 1986 (aged 22) | | | (Panamanian Football Federation) San Francisco F.C. |
| | MF | Cristian Vega | February 4, 1985 (aged 23) | | | Free agent |
| | MF | Manuel Bonilla | September 4, 1988 (aged 19) | | | (Panamanian Football Federation) Chorrillo |
| | MF | Alberto Quintero | October 12, 1987 (aged 20) | | | (Panamanian Football Federation) Chorrillo |
| | MF | Juan de Gracia | April 21, 1990 (aged 17) | | | (Panamanian Football Federation) Chepo F.C. |
| | MF | Reggie Arosemena | September 9, 1986 (aged 21) | | | (Panamanian Football Federation) Tauro F.C. |
| | MF | Aníbal Godoy | February 10, 1990 (aged 18) | | | (Panamanian Football Federation) Chepo F.C. |
| | FW | Edwin Aguilar | August 7, 1985 (aged 22) | | | (Panamanian Football Federation) Tauro F.C. |
| | FW | Gabriel Torres | October 31, 1988 (aged 19) | | | (Colombian Football Federation) La Equidad |

- [*]Carlos Rodriguez was called up after Jose Venegas got injured 4 days before the start of the tournament.

=== United States ===
| No. | Pos. | Player | Date of birth (age) | Caps | Goals | Club |
|---|---|---|---|---|---|---|
| 1 | GK | Chris Seitz | March 12, 1987 (aged 20) | | | (United States Soccer Federation) Real Salt Lake |
| 2 | DF | Marvell Wynne | May 8, 1986 (aged 21) | | | (Canadian Soccer Association) Toronto FC |
| 3 | DF | Michael Orozco | February 7, 1986 (aged 22) | | | (Mexican Football Federation) San Luis |
| 4 | DF | Patrick Ianni | June 15, 1985 (aged 22) | | | (United States Soccer Federation) Houston Dynamo |
| 5 | DF | Nathan Sturgis | July 6, 1987 (aged 20) | | | (United States Soccer Federation) Real Salt Lake |
| 6 | MF | Maurice Edu | April 18, 1986 (aged 21) | | | (Canadian Soccer Association) Toronto FC |
| 7 | MF | Stuart Holden | August 1, 1985 (aged 22) | | | (United States Soccer Federation) Houston Dynamo |
| 8 | MF | Sal Zizzo | April 3, 1987 (aged 20) | | | (German Football Association) Hannover 96 |
| 9 | FW | Charlie Davies | June 25, 1986 (aged 21) | | | (Swedish Football Association) Hammarby |
| 10 | MF | Dax McCarty | April 30, 1987 (aged 20) | | | (United States Soccer Federation) FC Dallas |
| 11 | MF | Freddy Adu | June 2, 1989 (aged 18) | | | (Portuguese Football Federation) Benfica |
| 12 | FW | Jozy Altidore | November 6, 1989 (aged 18) | | | (United States Soccer Federation) New York Red Bulls |
| 13 | DF | Hunter Freeman | January 8, 1985 (aged 23) | | | (United States Soccer Federation) New York Red Bulls |
| 14 | FW | Robbie Findley | August 4, 1985 (aged 22) | | | (United States Soccer Federation) Real Salt Lake |
| 15 | DF | Kamani Hill | December 28, 1985 (aged 22) | | | (German Football Association) VfL Wolfsburg |
| 16 | MF | Sacha Kljestan | September 9, 1985 (aged 22) | | | (United States Soccer Federation) Chivas USA |
| 17 | DF | Jonathan Spector | January 3, 1986 (aged 22) | | | (The Football Association) West Ham United |
| 18 | GK | Dominic Cervi | July 9, 1986 (aged 21) | | | (United States Soccer Federation) Chicago Fire |
| 19 | FW | Chad Barrett | April 30, 1985 (aged 22) | | | (United States Soccer Federation) Chicago Fire |
| 20 | MF | Eddie Gaven | October 25, 1986 (aged 21) | | | (United States Soccer Federation) Columbus Crew |

== Group B ==
=== Canada ===
The roster for the Canadian team was as follows.

| No. | Pos. | Player | Date of birth (age) | Caps | Goals | Club |
|---|---|---|---|---|---|---|
| 1 | GK | Asmir Begović | June 20, 1987 (aged 20) | | | (The Football Association) Portsmouth |
| 2 | DF | Graham Ramalho | January 12, 1986 (aged 22) | | | (Royal Dutch Football Association) FC Groningen |
| 3 | DF | Jacob Lensky | December 16, 1988 (aged 19) | | | (Royal Dutch Football Association) Feyenoord Rotterdam |
| 4 | DF | Dejan Jakovic | July 16, 1985 (aged 22) | | | (United States Soccer Federation) UAB Blazers |
| 5 | DF | André Hainault | June 16, 1986 (aged 21) | | | (Football Association of the Czech Republic) Sparta Prague |
| 6 | MF | Nikolas Ledgerwood | January 16, 1985 (aged 23) | | | (German Football Association) TSV 1860 München |
| 7 | MF | Andrzej Ornoch | August 21, 1985 (aged 22) | | | (Danish Football Association) Esbjerg fB |
| 8 | MF | Ryan Gyaki | December 6, 1985 (aged 22) | | | (German Football Association) F.C. Hansa Rostock |
| 9 | FW | Andrea Lombardo | May 23, 1987 (aged 20) | | | (Canadian Soccer Association) Toronto FC |
| 10 | FW | Will Johnson | January 21, 1987 (aged 21) | | | (Royal Dutch Football Association) De Graafschap |
| 11 | FW | Tosaint Ricketts | August 6, 1987 (aged 20) | | | (United States Soccer Federation) Green Bay Phoenix |
| 12 | DF | Diaz Kambere | October 18, 1985 (aged 22) | | | (Canadian Soccer Association) Vancouver Whitecaps |
| 13 | MF | Kyle Hall | January 27, 1986 (aged 22) | | | (United States Soccer Federation) Syracuse Orange |
| 14 | DF | Tyler Hemming | May 9, 1985 (aged 22) | | | (Canadian Soccer Association) Toronto FC |
| 15 | MF | Tyler Rosenlund | September 13, 1986 (aged 21) | | | (Canadian Soccer Association) Toronto FC |
| 16 | MF | Keegan Ayre | July 4, 1988 (aged 19) | | | (Scottish Football Association) Berwick Rangers FC |
| 17 | FW | Marcus Haber | January 11, 1989 (aged 19) | | | (Royal Dutch Football Association) FC Groningen |
| 18 | GK | Joshua Wagenaar | February 26, 1985 (aged 23) | | | Unattached |
| 19 | FW | Isidro Sánchez | June 8, 1987 (aged 20) | | | (Mexican Football Federation) Puebla |
| 22 | GK | David Monsalve | December 21, 1988 (aged 19) | | | Unattached |

=== Guatemala ===
| No. | Pos. | Player | Date of birth (age) | Caps | Goals | Club |
|---|---|---|---|---|---|---|
| 1 | GK | Ricardo Jeréz Jr. | February 4, 1986 (aged 22) | | | (National Football Federation of Guatemala) CSD Comunicaciones |
| 2 | DF | Carlos Castrillo | May 14, 1985 (aged 22) | | | (National Football Federation of Guatemala) Deportivo Jalapa |
| 3 | DF | Wilson Lalin | May 3, 1985 (aged 22) | | | (National Football Federation of Guatemala) C.D. Suchitepéquez |
| 4 | DF | Cristian Noriega | March 20, 1987 (aged 20) | | | (National Football Federation of Guatemala) CSD Municipal |
| 5 | DF | Erwin Morales | May 29, 1985 (aged 22) | | | (National Football Federation of Guatemala) CSD Comunicaciones |
| 6 | DF | Pablo Solorzano | March 1, 1988 (aged 20) | | | (National Football Federation of Guatemala) Deportivo Jalapa |
| 7 | MF | Jean Marquez | March 6, 1985 (aged 23) | | | (National Football Federation of Guatemala) Deportivo Jalapa |
| 8 | MF | Wilfred Velasquez | September 10, 1985 (aged 22) | | | (National Football Federation of Guatemala) C.D. Suchitepéquez |
| 9 | FW | Jairo Arreola | September 20, 1985 (aged 22) | | | (National Football Federation of Guatemala) CSD Comunicaciones |
| 10 | MF | José Manuel Contreras | January 19, 1986 (aged 22) | | | (National Football Federation of Guatemala) CSD Comunicaciones |
| 11 | MF | Marvin Ávila | December 6, 1985 (aged 22) | | | (National Football Federation of Guatemala) CSD Municipal |
| 12 | MF | Manuel Leon | September 23, 1987 (aged 20) | | | (National Football Federation of Guatemala) CSD Municipal |
| 13 | MF | Marco Pappa | November 15, 1987 (aged 20) | | | (United States Soccer Federation) Chicago Fire |
| 14 | DF | Rafael Morales | April 6, 1988 (aged 19) | | | (National Football Federation of Guatemala) Antigua |
| 15 | FW | Jonny Brown | January 15, 1986 (aged 22) | | | (National Football Federation of Guatemala) Deportivo Heredia |
| 16 | DF | Jamie Vides | December 12, 1987 (aged 20) | | | (National Football Federation of Guatemala) CSD Municipal |
| 17 | FW | Minor López | February 1, 1987 (aged 21) | | | (National Football Federation of Guatemala) Xelajú MC |
| 18 | FW | Abner Trigueros | December 27, 1987 (aged 20) | | | (National Football Federation of Guatemala) CSD Comunicaciones |
| 19 | FW | Carlos Villa | July 18, 1986 (aged 21) | | | (National Football Federation of Guatemala) CSD Municipal |
| 22 | GK | Jamie Carbajal | February 7, 1986 (aged 22) | | | unattached |

=== Haiti ===
| No. | Pos. | Player | Date of birth (age) | Caps | Goals | Club |
|---|---|---|---|---|---|---|
| 0 | GK | Dorleans Shelson | October 15, 1990 (aged 17) | | | (Haitian Football Federation) AS Capoise |
| 1 | GK | Johny Placide | January 29, 1988 (aged 20) | | | (French Football Federation) Le Havre |
| 3 | DF | Parnel Guerrier | July 5, 1985 (aged 22) | | | (Haitian Football Federation) Victory SC |
| 4 | MF | Alain Vubert | November 25, 1985 (aged 22) | | | (Haitian Football Federation) Baltimore SC |
| 5 | MF | Jean Sony Alcénat | January 23, 1986 (aged 22) | | | (Haitian Football Federation) Aigle Noir AC |
| 6 | MF | Lescinel Jean-François | October 2, 1986 (aged 21) | | | (French Football Federation) En Avant Guingamp |
| 7 | MF | Serge Louis | November 6, 1985 (aged 22) | | | (Haitian Football Federation) Baltimore SC |
| 8 | FW | Fritzson Jean Baptiste | January 4, 1986 (aged 22) | | | (Haitian Football Federation) Aigle Noir AC |
| 9 | MF | Leonel Saint-Preux | May 12, 1985 (aged 22) | | | (Haitian Football Federation) Zenith AC |
| 10 | MF | Sony Norde | July 27, 1989 (aged 18) | | | (Argentine Football Association) Boca Juniors |
| 11 | FW | Fabrice Noël | July 21, 1985 (aged 22) | | | (Puerto Rican Football Federation) Puerto Rico Islanders |
| 12 | MF | James Marcelin | June 13, 1986 (aged 21) | | | (Haitian Football Federation) Racing Club Haïtien |
| 13 | FW | Alain Gustave | October 5, 1986 (aged 21) | | | (Haitian Football Federation) Zenith AC |
| 14 | MF | Jacqueson Jean | July 14, 1988 (aged 19) | | | (Haitian Football Federation) AS Capoise |
| 15 | DF | Ednerson Raymond | June 19, 1985 (aged 22) | | | (Haitian Football Federation) Baltimore SC |
| 16 | DF | Markorel Sampeur | March 20, 1986 (aged 21) | | | (Haitian Football Federation) Violette AC |
| 17 | DF | Jean Paulin | May 3, 1986 (aged 21) | | | (Haitian Football Federation) Aigle Noir AC |
| 18 | GK | Peterson Occénat | December 3, 1989 (aged 18) | | | (Haitian Football Federation) Racing Club Haïtien |
| 19 | FW | Bidrece Azor | March 14, 1988 (aged 19) | | | (Italian Football Federation) Teramo Calcio |
| 20 | DF | Judelin Aveska | December 21, 1987 (aged 20) | | | (Argentine Football Association) River Plate |

=== Mexico ===
Coach: Hugo Sánchez

The roster for the Mexican team was as follows.

| No. | Pos. | Player | Date of birth (age) | Caps | Goals | Club |
|---|---|---|---|---|---|---|
| 1 | GK | Guillermo Ochoa (c) | July 13, 1985 (aged 22) | 5 | 0 | (Mexican Football Federation) América |
| 2 | DF | Efraín Velarde | April 18, 1986 (aged 21) | 1 | 0 | (Mexican Football Federation) UNAM |
| 3 | DF | Edgar Castillo | October 8, 1986 (aged 21) | 5 | 0 | (Mexican Football Federation) Santos |
| 4 | DF | Hugo Ayala | March 31, 1987 (aged 20) | 9 | 0 | (Mexican Football Federation) Atlas |
| 5 | DF | Julio Domínguez | November 8, 1987 (aged 20) | 5 | 0 | (Mexican Football Federation) Cruz Azul |
| 6 | DF | Luis Omar Hernández | November 8, 1985 (aged 22) | 2 | 0 | (Mexican Football Federation) Necaxa |
| 7 | MF | Pablo Barrera | June 21, 1987 (aged 20) | 5 | 0 | (Mexican Football Federation) UNAM |
| 8 | MF | Alan Zamora | April 8, 1985 (aged 22) | 2 | 0 | (Mexican Football Federation) Atlante F.C. |
| 9 | FW | Luis Ángel Landín | July 23, 1985 (aged 22) | 4 | 0 | (Mexican Football Federation) Morelia |
| 10 | MF | César Villaluz | July 18, 1988 (aged 19) | 5 | 0 | (Mexican Football Federation) Cruz Azul |
| 11 | FW | Enrique Esqueda | April 19, 1988 (aged 19) | 10 | 5 | (Mexican Football Federation) América |
| 12 | GK | Jonathan Orozco | May 12, 1986 (aged 21) | 2 | 0 | (Mexican Football Federation) Monterrey |
| 13 | DF | Francisco Gamboa | April 20, 1985 (aged 22) | 3 | 0 | (Mexican Football Federation) Toluca |
| 14 | MF | Jorge Hernández | February 22, 1988 (aged 20) | 3 | 0 | (Mexican Football Federation) Atlas |
| 15 | DF | Patricio Araujo | January 30, 1988 (aged 20) | 4 | 0 | (Mexican Football Federation) Guadalajara |
| 16 | MF | Sergio Ávila | September 2, 1985 (aged 22) | 5 | 1 | (Mexican Football Federation) Guadalajara |
| 17 | FW | Santiago Fernández | March 7, 1985 (aged 23) | 4 | 0 | (Mexican Football Federation) Toluca |
| 18 | MF | Edgar Andrade | March 2, 1988 (aged 20) | 5 | 1 | (Mexican Football Federation) Cruz Azul |
| 19 | MF | Juan Carlos Silva | February 6, 1988 (aged 20) | 2 | 0 | (Mexican Football Federation) América |
| 20 | GK | Alfonso Blanco | July 31, 1987 (aged 20) | 0 | 0 | (Mexican Football Federation) Cruz Azul |
