= 2025 Liga Nacional de Cuba =

Liga Nacional de Cuba
- Season: 2025
- Dates: 6 March 2025 – 13 December 2025
- Country: Cuba
- Teams: 16
- Champions: FC La Habana
- Runner up: Santiago de Cuba
- Matches: 110
- Goals: 197 (1.79 per match)
- Top goalscorer: (Cuba) Randy Valier (14 goals)
- Biggest home win: La Habana 8-2 Las Tunas December 10, 2025
- Biggest away win: Granma 0-6 Guantanamo June 14, 2025
- Highest scoring: La Habana 8-2 Las Tunas December 10, 2025

The 2025 Liga Nacional de Fútbol de Cuba was the 108th season of the Campeonato Nacional de Fútbol de Cuba, the top division football competition in Cuba. Both the Apertura and Clausura tournaments were won by FC La Habana, the first time they've won the league in 24 years. The tournament was temporality delayed during the Clausura due to Hurricane Melissa going through the island.

== Apertura ==
Locations of the 2025 Liga Nacional de Fútbol de Cuba teams
Group A
Group B
Group C
Group D

This season, 4 groups, A, B, C, and D, were created, with 4 teams in each group, where each team in each group played each other 4 times, for a total of 12 games (unless there was game cancellation), with the first round starting on Saturday, March 8.

=== Group A ===
Pos	Team	Pld	W	D	L	GF	GA	GD	Pts	Qualification or relegation
1	La Habana	11	7	3	1	21	12	+9	24	Advance to Clausura
2	Artemisa	12	4	4	4	18	19	−1	16	Advance to Clausura Qualifiers
3	Isla de La Juventud	11	3	2	6	8	14	−6	11	
4	Pinar del Río	10	2	3	5	11	13	−2	9	

Source: SofaScore

=== Group B ===
Pos	Team	Pld	W	D	L	GF	GA	GD	Pts	Qualification or relegation
1	Cienfuegos	12	6	4	2	20	11	+9	22	Advance to Clausura
2	Villa Clara	12	6	4	2	16	7	+9	22	Advance to Clausura Qualifiers
3	Matanzas	12	3	3	6	10	13	−3	12	
4	Mayabeque	12	2	3	7	11	26	−15	9	

Source: SofaScore

=== Group C ===
Pos	Team	Pld	W	D	L	GF	GA	GD	Pts	Qualification or relegation
1	Las Tunas	12	7	1	4	20	13	+7	22	Advance to Clausura
2	Ciego de Ávila	12	6	2	4	16	9	+7	20	Advance to Clausura Qualifiers
3	Camagüey	12	5	2	5	17	17	0	17	
4	Sancti Spíritus	12	2	3	7	6	20	−14	9	

Source: SofaScore

=== Group D ===
Pos	Team	Pld	W	D	L	GF	GA	GD	Pts	Qualification or relegation
1	Guantánamo	12	8	3	1	25	6	+19	27	Advance to Clausura
2	Santiago de Cuba	11	4	3	4	12	11	+1	15	Advance to Clausura Qualifiers
3	Holguín	12	3	4	5	12	19	−7	13	
4	Granma	11	2	2	7	9	22	−13	8	

Source: SofaScore

=== Apertura Final ===
12 July 2025
Apertura Final

FC Guantánamo	0–1	FC La Habana
	Report	Viamontes 55'

Estadio Rogelio Palacios, Guantánamo

== Clausura Qualifiers ==
5 July 2025
First Leg

FC Artemisa	2–3	FC Villa Clara
Hernández 51'; Ramos 60'	Report	Betancourt (pen.); Hurtado 72'; Molina 74'

Estadio de Guanajay, Guanajay
9 July 2025
Second Leg

FC Villa Clara	1–1	FC Artemisa
Águila 15'	Report	Hernández 5'

Estadio Camilo Cienfuegos, Zulueta

FC Villa Clara won 4–3 on aggregate.

6 July 2025
First Leg

FC Santiago de Cuba	1–1	FC Ciego de Ávila
Franklin Jacas 45+1'	Report	Marrero 47'

Estadio Antonio Maceo, Santiago de Cuba
9 July 2025
Second Leg

FC Ciego de Ávila	1–1	FC Santiago de Cuba
Marrero 30'	Report	Martinez 90+4'
Penalties
	6–7

Estadio Sergio Alonso Grandal, Morón

2–2 on aggregate; FC Santiago de Cuba won 7–6 on penalties.

== Clausura ==
The first 2 matches of each team were placed at FC Santiago de Cuba's José Pepe del Cabo Stadium, in Santiago de Cuba, with the last 3 games of the Clausura being played at the La Polar Stadium in Cerro, Havana, the home stadium of FC La Habana, starting between 8:30 AM-3:00 PM. After the first round in Santiago de Cuba was played, the clausura temporality shut down due to Hurricane Melissa in the area. The tournament ended with the top scorer of the clasura, and the whole Campeonato Nacional, being 31-year old Randy Valier of FC Guantánamo scoring 4 goals in the Clausura, and 14 total in the 2025 Campeonato Nacional.

Pos	Team	Pld	W	D	L	GF	GA	GD	Pts	Qualification or relegation
1	La Habana (C)	5	4	0	1	16	7	+9	12	Advance to the Final
2	Santiago de Cuba	5	3	1	1	16	8	+8	10	Advance to the Final
3	Guantánamo	5	2	2	1	10	7	+3	8	Advance to the 3rd Place Round
4	Villa Clara	5	2	1	2	10	7	+3	7	Advance to the 3rd Place Round
5	Cienfuegos	5	1	0	4	8	17	−9	3	
6	Las Tunas	5	1	0	4	4	18	−14	3	

Source: SofaScore
(C) Champions

=== Final ===
14 December 2025
Clausura Final

FC La Habana	2–1	FC Santiago de Cuba
Iglesias 62'; Reinoso 86'	Report	Martinez (yellow card) 7'; León (yellow card) 38'; Herrera 58'

Estadio La Polar, Havana
Referee: Adrián Lage (Cuba)

=== 3rd Place Round ===
14 December 2025
Clausura 3rd place play-off

FC Guantánamo	0–0	FC Villa Clara
Penalties
	3–2

Estadio La Polar, Havana

== Season statistics ==
=== Top goal scorers ===
Rank	Player	Apertura Goals	Clausura Goals	Total Goals	Club
1	(Cuba) Randy Valier	10	4	14	Guantanamo
2	(Cuba) Keyler James	7	0	7	Camaguey
2	(Cuba) Reinier Cerdeira	6	1	7	Cienfuegos
4	(Cuba) Kelvin Castañeda	5	1	6	Matanzas / Villa Clara
4	(Cuba) Darío Pons	4	2	6	Las Tunas
4	(Cuba) José Luis Rodríguez	4	2	6	La Habana
4	(Cuba) Brian Romero	4	2	6	La Habana
4	(Cuba) Yoandir Puga	2	4	6	Isla de la Juventud / La Habana
9	(Cuba) Dariel Marín	4	1	5	La Habana
9	(Cuba) Pedro Brayan Ortiz	3	2	5	Santiago de Cuba

=== Hat-tricks ===
Player	For	Against	Result	Date	Tournament
(Cuba) Kelvin Castañeda^{4}	Matanzas	Mayabeque	4–1 (–)	8 March	Apertura
(Cuba) Reinier Cerdeira	Cienfuegos	Matanzas	3–2 (A)	15 March	Apertura
(Cuba) Randy Valier	Guantanamo	Holguín	3–2 (A)	18 May	Apertura
(Cuba) Brian Romero^{4}	La Habana	Artemisa	5–1 (H)	28 May	Apertura

Note: ^{4} – player scored 4 goals
