= 2015 Liga Nacional de Cuba =

Liga Nacional de Cuba
- Season: 2015
- Champions: FC Camagüey
- CFU Club Championship: FC Camagüey; FC Cienfuegos
- Matches: 90

The 2016 Liga Nacional de Cuba was the 105th season of the top football division in Cuba. FC Camagüey were the champions.

== Table ==
Pos	Team	Pld	W	D	L	GF	GA	GD	Pts	Qualification or relegation
1	Camagüey (C)	17	13	1	3	29	14	+15	40	Qualification to the 2017 CFU Club Championship
2	Cienfuegos	18	7	7	4	19	12	+7	28	Qualification to the 2017 CFU Club Championship
3	La Habana	18	6	8	4	20	18	+2	26	
4	Villa Clara	18	7	4	7	30	19	+11	25	
5	Santiago	18	6	6	6	17	14	+3	24	
6	Guantánamo	18	6	6	6	16	16	0	24	
7	Ciego de Ávila	18	6	5	7	28	23	+5	23	
8	Las Tunas	18	5	6	7	18	34	−16	21	
9	Sancti Spíritus	18	4	4	10	13	30	−17	16	Relegation playoff
10	Isla de La Juventud	17	4	3	10	17	26	−9	15	Relegation playoff

Updated to match(es) played on 2015.
Source: rsssf.org
(C) Champions
