= Roberney Caballero =

Cuban footballer (born 1995)

Personal information
- Full name: Roberney Caballero Ariosa
- Date of birth: 2 November 1995 (age 31)
- Place of birth: Remedios, Cuba
- Height: 1.70 m (5 ft 7 in)
- Position: Midfielder

Team information
- Current team: ART Municipal Jalapa

Senior career*
| Years | Team | Apps | (Gls) |
| 2014–2018 | Villa Clara | 42+ | (24+) |
| 2018–2019 | Camagüey | | |
| 2019–2023 | Villa Clara | | |
| 2023 | La Habana | | |
| 2023– | ART Municipal Jalapa | | |

International career
| 2015 | Cuba U20 | 5 | (1) |
| 2016–2022 | Cuba | 15 | (3) |
- * Club domestic league appearances and goals

Roberney Caballero Ariosa (born 2 November 1995) is a Cuban professional footballer who plays as a midfielder for Nicaraguan club ART Municipal Jalapa and the Cuba national team.

== Club career ==
Caballero scored six goals in the 2016 season, leading Villa Clara to their 14th league title. He was named that season's Most Valuable Player by the Football Association of Cuba.

After defecting to the United States in 2023, Caballero signed with ART Municipal Jalapa of the Liga Primera de Nicaragua.

== International career ==
Caballero represented the Cuba national under-20 team at the 2015 CONCACAF U-20 Championship, playing in all five group matches. He scored the opening goal in a 2–2 draw with Haiti. He also scored against Honduras, but the strike was ruled offside.

He made his senior international debut on 7 October 2016, during a match against the United States. In what was the first friendly between the two countries since 1947, Caballero hit the post in the second half of Cuba's 2–0 defeat.

On 29 June 2023, Caballero was among the four Cuban players who defected to the United States following their opening match of the 2023 CONCACAF Gold Cup group stage, a 1–0 defeat to Guatemala.

== Career statistics ==
As of 18 November 2022

Cuba
| Year | Apps | Goals |
|---|---|---|
| 2016 | 1 | 0 |
| 2017 | 0 | 0 |
| 2018 | 7 | 3 |
| 2019 | 5 | 0 |
| 2022 | 2 | 0 |
| Total | 15 | 3 |

Scores and results list Cuba's goal tally first.

| No | Date | Venue | Opponent | Score | Result | Competition |
|---|---|---|---|---|---|---|
| 1. | 25 March 2018 | Nicaragua National Football Stadium, Managua, Nicaragua | Nicaragua | 3–3 | 3–3 | Friendly |
| 2. | 8 September 2018 | Estadio Pedro Marrero, Havana, Cuba | Turks and Caicos Islands | 9–0 | 11–0 | 2019–20 CONCACAF Nations League qualification |
| 3. | 8 September 2018 | Estadio Pedro Marrero, Havana, Cuba | Turks and Caicos Islands | 10–0 | 11–0 | 2019–20 CONCACAF Nations League qualification |

== Honours ==
Villa Clara

- Campeonato Nacional: 2016

Individual

- Campeonato Nacional MVP: 2016
