= 2016 Campeonato Nacional de Fútbol de Cuba =

Campeonato Nacional
- Season: 2016
- Champions: Villa Clara
- CFU Club Championship: Villa Clara; Guantánamo
- Matches: 90
- Biggest home win: Tied (6 goals)
- Biggest away win: Cienfuegos 0–6 Las Tunas (18 June 2016)
- Highest scoring: Tied (6 goals)

The 2016 Campeonato Nacional de Fútbol de Cuba was the 105th season of the competition. The season began on 6 February 2016 and concluded on 18 June 2016. The league was won by Villa Clara, who claimed their 14th Cuban league title, and their first since 2013. Villa Clara and Guantánamo earned berths into the 2017 CFU Club Championship as league winners and runners-up, respectively. However, it does not necessarily mean they will participate.

== Table ==
Pos	Team	Pld	W	D	L	GF	GA	GD	Pts	Qualification or relegation
1	Villa Clara (C)	18	11	3	4	33	19	+14	36	Qualification to the 2017 CFU Club Championship
2	Guantánamo	18	11	3	4	32	19	+13	36	Qualification to the 2017 CFU Club Championship
3	La Habana	18	11	2	5	34	17	+17	35	
4	Santiago	17	9	4	4	21	14	+7	31	
5	Ciego de Ávila	18	7	5	6	32	24	+8	26	
6	Las Tunas	18	6	5	7	28	33	−5	23	
7	Granma	18	5	4	9	27	40	−13	19	
8	Camagüey	18	5	3	10	18	25	−7	18	
9	Isla de La Juventud	17	4	3	10	17	30	−13	15	
10	Cienfuegos	18	3	2	13	11	32	−21	11	Relegation playoff

Updated to match(es) played on 19 October 2016.
Source: rsssf.com
(C) Champions
