= Yoandir Puga =

Cuban footballer (born 1988)

Personal information
- Full name: Yoandir Puga Estévez
- Date of birth: 3 January 1988 (age 38)
- Place of birth: Nueva Gerona, Cuba
- Height: 1.82 m (6 ft 0 in)
- Position: Forward

Team information
- Current team: FC La Habana (loan)
- Number: 11

Youth career
- FC Isla de la Juventud

Senior career*
Years	Team	Apps	(Gls)
2007–2017	Isla de la Juventud		(82)
13	→ La Habana (loan)		(7)
2014	→ Villa Clara (loan)		(13)
2017	→ Santiago de Cuba (loan)		(10)
2017–2019	Five Islands		(21)
2019–2022	Hoppers		
2022–2023	Isla de la Juventud		
2023–2024	Hoppers		
2025–	Isla de la Juventud		(2)
2025–	→ La Habana (loan)		(4)

International career^{‡}
2013–2015	Cuba	11	(0)
- * Club domestic league appearances and goals ‡ National team caps and goals as of 30 March 2015

Yoandir Puga (born 3 January 1988) is a Cuban footballer who plays as a forward for FC Isla de La Juventud. He has played professional in the Antigua and Barbuda Premier Division, for Five Islands F.C. and Hoppers F.C., with him most recently been on loan with FC La Habana, helping them win the 2025 Liga Nacional de Cuba Clausura. He is nicknamed "El Rifle" ("The Rifle"), being the 4th top scorer of the Liga Nacional de Cuba history, with 120 total goals for every team he has played for since his debut.

== Club career ==
=== Liga Nacional de Cuba and Liga Ascenso de Cuba ===
Puga started off playing for FC Isla de La Juventud, going on loan in other clubs as well. In total from his debut in the 2007-08 Liga Nacional de Cuba until the 2017 Liga Nacional de Cuba, he scored 99 goals, 67 of which being at the first division, 20 in the second division, 5 in the third division, and 7 in the fourth division.

While on loan for FC Villa Clara in the 2014 season, Puga became the leagues top scorer with 13 goals that season

In the 2017 season of the Liga Nacional, Puga was tied for second top scorer of the league with ten goals in 21 matches, while on loan to FC Santiago de Cuba, tied with Pablo Ramon Labrada, with first place being Sánder Fernández, with 13.

He scored his 99th and 100th goals for the league in the same game in March 2017, playing for Isla de La Juventud against FC Mayabeque.

=== Five Islands F.C. ===
Puga, along with other Cuban footballers that were formally playing for the Liga Nacional de Cuba, signed professional contracts to play in the Antigua and Barbuda Premier Division. Puga, Sánder Fernández, Yosvani Caballero, Armando Oramas, and Julio Pichardo all went to go play for Five Islands F.C. in Five Islands, Antigua and Barbuda.

=== FC Isla de La Juventud (2022–23) ===
Puga rejoined the Isla de la Juventud, with him bringing his goal amount in the league to 114, with him scoring four of those final goals at the end of the Apertura of the 2023 Liga Nacional de Cuba season, against FC Matanzas, for him to finish off the season with 114 goals for the league.

=== FC Isla de La Juventud (2025) ===
For the 2025 Liga Nacional de Cuba, Puga scored two more goals on the last matcbday of the Apertura, for the Isla de La Juventud, bringing him onto 116 goals in the league, until Isla de La Juventud got relegated from the Clausura of the 2025 season.

=== Loan to FC La Habana (2025) ===
After FC Isla de La Juventud got relegated off the Clausura stage of the 2025 Liga Nacional de Cuba, Puga, scoring was loaned to fellow Group A side, FC La Habana, the winner of the Apertura that season, with him scoring 4 goals in Habana's Clausura run, being the 4th top scorer in the 2025 season for Habana, and the top scorer of the team in the 2025 Clausura. Habana finished first in the Clausura on the final matchday, due to Puga's sole goal in a 1–0 win to FC Villa Clara, which he scored two minutes after getting subbed on, to go against second in the table, FC Santiago de Cuba, in the Clausura final, and ending the 2025 season with 120 goals at age 37.

== Honors ==
FC Isla de La Juventud

- Torneo de Ascenso: 2012

FC Santiago de Cuba

- Liga Nacional de Cuba Clausura: 2017

Five Islands F.C.

- Antigua and Barbuda Premier Division runner-up: 2017–18

FC La Habana

- Liga Nacional de Cuba Clausura: 2025

Individual

- Liga Nacional de Cuba top scorer: 2014
