= Jorge Corrales =

Cuban footballer (born 1991)

Jorge Corrales Cordero
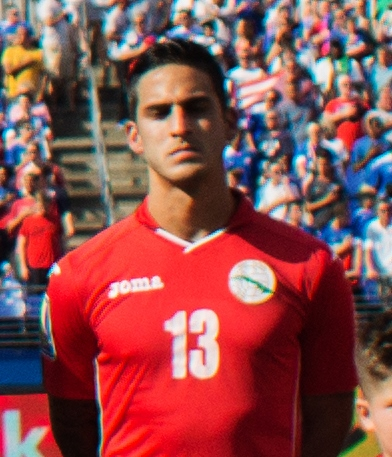
- Corrales with Cuba in 2015

Personal information
- Full name: Jorge Luis Corrales Cordero
- Date of birth: 20 May 1991 (age 35)
- Place of birth: Pinar del Río, Cuba
- Height: 1.75 m (5 ft 9 in)
- Position: Defender

Senior career*
Years	Team	Apps	(Gls)
2009–2015	Pinar del Río	80	(6)
2015	→ Sancti Spíritus (loan)	18	(1)
2015	Fortuna SC		
2016	Miami	1	(0)
2016	Fort Lauderdale Strikers	17	(0)
2017	Tulsa Roughnecks	25	(1)
2017–2019	Chicago Fire	32	(0)
2017	→ Tulsa Roughnecks (loan)	5	(0)
2019–2020	Montreal Impact	18	(0)
2021–2023	Tulsa	44	(0)
2024	Lexington SC	21	(0)
2025	Texoma FC	0	(0)

International career^{‡}
2010–2011	Cuba U20	6	(1)
2011	Cuba U22	2	(0)
2011	Cuba U23	3	(1)
2011–2023	Cuba	50	(1)
- * Club domestic league appearances and goals as of 30 January 2025 ‡ National team caps and goals as of 17 January 2024

Jorge Luis Corrales Cordero (born 20 May 1991) is a Cuban former professional footballer who last played as a defender for USL League One club Texoma FC, and the Cuba national team.

== Club career ==
Corrales began his career in 2009, playing for FC Pinar del Río in his hometown of Pinar del Río. He was the captain of FC Pinar del Río from 2011 until 2015, when he was loaned to FC Sancti Spíritus. Corrales was named Pinar del Río's MVP in the 2012, 2013, and 2014 seasons. He tallied 20 assists and 6 goals during his more than 80 appearances for FCPR.

In 2015, Corrales obtained a US Visa from the U.S. Embassy in Havana and arrived in Miami to visit family and friends. Corrales joined amateur Miami-based Fortuna SC in October 2015. Fortuna SC had a strong Cuban contingent and included full Cuban senior international players Ariel Martinez and Dario Suarez, and under-23 internationals Brian Rosales, Frank López García and Yendry Torres.

While in Miami, he decided to initiate the necessary legal proceedings to obtain a work permit and legally live in the United States to pursue a professional soccer career. Following a successful tryout with Miami FC, he signed for the newly created team in January 2016. He joined Fort Lauderdale Strikers in June the same year. Corrales joined the Tulsa Roughnecks FC on 2 March 2017. He transferred to Chicago Fire in Major League Soccer on 14 September 2017.

On 7 August 2019, Corrales was traded to Montreal Impact in exchange for Micheal Azira and a second-round 2020 MLS SuperDraft pick.

Corrales joined USL League One club Lexington SC on January 17, 2024. He was released by Lexington following their 2024 season.

Corrales signed with Texoma FC on 30 January 2025, ahead of the team's inaugural season in USL League One.

== International career ==
Corrales played in the 2011 CONCACAF U-20 Championship and the 2011 Pan American Games tournament.

He made his senior international debut for Cuba in a December 2011 friendly match against Costa Rica and has earned a total of 50 caps, scoring 1 goal. He represented his country in 11 FIFA World Cup qualifying matches

During the 2015 CONCACAF Gold Cup, Corrales played as a right back and center back during two of Cuba's three group stage matches.

=== International goals ===
Scores and results list Cuba's goal tally first.

No	Date	Venue	Opponent	Score	Result	Competition
1.	13 November 2014	Montego Bay Sports Complex, Montego Bay, Jamaica	Curaçao	1–0	3–2	2014 Caribbean Cup

== Honours ==
Montreal Impact

- Canadian Championship: 2019

Cuba

- Caribbean Cup: 2012
