= Geobel Pérez =

Cuban association football player

Personal information
- Full name: Geobel Pérez Oquendo
- Date of birth: 2 June 1999 (age 27)
- Place of birth: Havana, Cuba
- Height: 1.73 m (5 ft 8 in)
- Positions: Midfielder; forward

Youth career
- Ciudad de La Habana

Senior career*
Years	Team	Apps	(Gls)
2018	Ciudad de La Habana		
- Fortuna SC
2019	Storm		
2021–2022	Charleston Battery	50	(5)

International career^{‡}
2018	Cuba U20	5	(5)
- * Club domestic league appearances and goals as of 17 October 2022 ‡ National team caps and goals as of 9 November 2018

Geobel Pérez Oquendo (born 2 June 1999) is a Cuban professional footballer who plays as both a midfielder and forward.

== Club career ==
=== Early career ===
Born in Havana, Pérez began his career in the youth setup of Ciudad de La Habana. In 2018, after performing well during a youth tournament, Pérez was called up to the Ciudad de La Habana first-team in the Campeonato Nacional de Fútbol de Cuba. Later that year, following the CONCACAF U-20 Championship, Pérez defected from Cuba and joined Fortuna SC, an amateur club in Florida which comprises mainly Cuban footballers. Pérez stated that he was the last member of his team to defect that tournament, saying "Others had left in previous games before the tournament was over, I waited until it finished, I even ate with the team and was there until the last day."

In 2019, Pérez joined National Premier Soccer League club Storm, another club comprising mainly Cuban players from Fortuna SC.

=== Charleston Battery ===
On 14 January 2021, Pérez signed with USL Championship club Charleston Battery. Prior to his arrival, the Battery had been known for bringing in Cuban players who had defected from previous tournaments, such as Osvaldo Alonso, Maikel Chang, and Heviel Cordovés, and giving them a start to their professional career in the United States. Pérez made his professional debut for the Battery on 7 May 2021 against New York Red Bulls II, coming on as a 76th minute substitute in a 1–1 draw. Pérez featured in 22 matches in his rookie campaign, scoring two goals and notching two assists.

Pérez scored his first goal of 2022 in stoppage time against Atlanta United 2 on June 29, the highlight reel strike earned him USL Championship Goal of the Week honors for Week 17 and a nomination for the league's June Goal of the Month award. The goal was featured by Fútbol Americas in their top 10 goals of the week, coming in at No. 8, during their episode that aired the following day. Pérez was named to the USL Championship Team of the Week for his Week 20 performance against Colorado Springs Switchbacks FC when he scored one goal and one assist in the 3–3 draw on July 22. Following the 2022 season, Pérez was released by Charleston.

== International career ==
Pérez was called into the Cuba under-20 side for the 2018 CONCACAF U-20 Championship. He scored in his nation's first match against Belize, scoring the fourth in a 6–1 victory. He would tally five goals in the tournament, the most all-time for the Cuba U-20s in the competition.

== Career statistics ==
=== Club ===
As of match played 23 May 2021

Appearances and goals by club, season and competition
Club	Season	League			National Cup		Continental		Total	
Club	Season	Division	Apps	Goals	Apps	Goals	Apps	Goals	Apps	Goals
Charleston Battery	2021	USL Championship	3	0	0	0	—		3	0
Career total			3	0	0	0	0	0	3	0
