= Elier Pozo =

Cuban footballer

Personal information
- Full name: Elier Pozo Ballona
- Date of birth: 28 January 1995 (age 31)
- Place of birth: Consolación del Sur, Cuba
- Height: 1.90 m (6 ft 3 in)
- Position: Goalkeeper

Team information
- Current team: Navegantes

Senior career*
Years	Team	Apps	(Gls)
–2016	Pinar del Río		
2017	Camagüey		
- Pinar del Río
2019	Cienfuegos		
- Pinar del Río
2021–	Navegantes		

International career
2015–	Cuba	2	(0)
- * Club domestic league appearances and goals

Elier Pozo Ballona (born 28 January 1995) is a Cuban footballer who plays as a goalkeeper for Navegantes.

== Career ==
In 2021, Pozo signed for Brazilian sixth division side Navegantes.
