= Reysander Fernández =

Cuban footballer

Personal information
- Full name: Reysander Fernández Cervantes
- Date of birth: August 22, 1984 (age 42)
- Place of birth: Morón, Cuba
- Height: 1.79 m (5 ft 10 in)
- Position: Defender

Senior career*
Years	Team	Apps	(Gls)
2004–2012	Ciego de Ávila		
2007	→ Pinar del Río (loan)		(0)
2013–2015	Brampton United		

International career
2003–2012	Cuba	64	(4)
- * Club domestic league appearances and goals

Reysander Fernandez Cervantes (born August 22, 1984) is a footballer from Cuba who played in the Campeonato Nacional de Fútbol de Cuba and the Canadian Soccer League. He is a former member of the Cuba national team.

== Club career ==
Fernández began his career in 2004 with FC Ciego de Ávila of the Campeonato Nacional de Fútbol de Cuba. With Ciego de Ávila he won the Campeonato Nacional de Fútbol de Cuba title in 2009. In Canada, he signed with Brampton United of the Canadian Soccer League. In his debut season he helped clinch a postseason berth by finishing fourth in the overall standings. He featured in the quarterfinal match against SC Waterloo, but were eliminated by a score of 4–0.

== International career ==
Fernández made his international debut for the Cuba national team in a March 2003 friendly match against Jamaica and has earned a total of 64 caps, scoring four goals. He represented his country in 11 FIFA World Cup qualifying matches and played at 4 CONCACAF Gold Cup final tournaments.

His final international was a September 2012 FIFA World Cup qualification match against Honduras.

== Personal life ==
His brother Sánder also played for the national team.

=== Defection to the USA ===
In October 2012, he defected to the United States with teammates Heviel Cordovés, Maikel Chang, Odisnel Cooper and Ignacio Abreu after he had traveled to Toronto with the Cuba national football team for a World Cup qualifying game.

== Career statistics ==
=== International ===
Appearances and goals by national team and year
National team	Year	Apps	Goals
Cuba	2003	11	1
Cuba	2004	1	0
Cuba	2005	8	0
Cuba	2006	5	0
Cuba	2007	8	0
Cuba	2008	12	1
Cuba	2009	0	0
Cuba	2010	8	2
Cuba	2011	8	0
Cuba	2012	3	0
Total		64	4

Scores and results list Cuba's goal tally first, score column indicates score after each Fernández goal.

List of international goals scored by Reysander Fernández
No.	Date	Venue	Opponent	Score	Result	Competition
1	6 July 2003	National Stadium, Kingston, Jamaica	Jamaica	1–0	2–1	Friendly
2	4 December 2008	Jarrett Park, Montego Bay, Jamaica	Guadeloupe	1–0	2–1	2008 Caribbean Cup
3	10 November 2010	Antigua Recreation Ground, St. John's, Antigua and Barbuda	Dominica	2–1	4–2	2010 Caribbean Cup qualification
4	3 December 2010	Stade de Dillon, Fort-de-France, Martinique	Guadeloupe	1–0	1–2	2010 Caribbean Cup
