= Didier Reinoso =

Cuban footballer (born 2007)

Personal information
- Full name: Didier Lorenzo Reinoso Maturell
- Date of birth: 31 March 2007 (age 19)
- Place of birth: Havana, Cuba
- Height: 1.73 m (5 ft 8 in)
- Position: Forward

Team information
- Current team: Veraguas United
- Number: 60

Youth career
- FC La Habana

Senior career*
Years	Team	Apps	(Gls)
–2026	FC La Habana		(1)
2026–	Veraguas United	0	(0)

International career^{‡}
2023–	Cuba U17	4	(3)
2024–	Cuba U20	16	(3)
2026–	Cuba	1	(1)
- * Club domestic league appearances and goals as of 14 December 2025 ‡ National team caps and goals as of 25 September 2026

Didier Lorenzo Reinoso Maturell (born 31 March 2007), nicknamed Bodoque, is a Cuban footballer who plays for Veraguas United FC in the Liga LPF of Panama and internationally represents Cuba at a youth level.

== Youth career ==
Being born in Havana, Reinoso played for FC La Habana at youth level, with him winning national championships at the youth level with La Habana.

== Club career ==
=== FC La Habana ===
In 2025, Reinoso won the Liga Nacional de Cuba Apertura and Clausura with FC La Habana. He went on to score his only goal in the season in the Clausura Final, to win the game 2–1 in the 86th minute after getting subbed on for Brian Romero, against FC Santiago de Cuba.

=== Veraguas United FC ===
On 28 June 2026, Didier arrived in Panama, to sign a one year contract with first division team Veraguas United FC, in Santiago de Veraguas, in which he is expected to start, which he reportedly chose to play for over European offers.

== International career ==
=== Cuba U17 ===
Didier made his debut for the Cuba national under-17 football team on 12 February 2023 in the 2023 CONCACAF U-17 Championship, scoring a brace on his debut against Jamaica, in a 4–2 loss. He started every game for Cuba in the competition, only getting subbed out late against Guadeloupe, in which he scored his third and last goal for the U-17 selection, with his U-17 career ending at the round of 16 exit in a 2–0 loss against Panama.

=== Cuba U20 ===
In the 2026 CONCACAF U-20 Championship, Reinoso scored the first goal for Cuba in its first game, scoring in the 18th minute in a 3-0 win against El Salvador.

== Honors ==
FC La Habana

- Apertura: 2025
- Clausura: 2025
