= Cartaya (surname) =

Cartaya is a surname. Notable people with the surname include:

- Arian Cartaya (born 2013), Cuban-American actor
- Guillermo Hernández-Cartaya (born 1932), Cuban banker
- Loanny Cartaya (born 1985), Cuban footballer
- Reinier Cartaya (born 1981), Cuban cyclist
