= Reynaldo Pérez =

Cuban footballer

Personal information
- Full name: Reynaldo Pérez Ramos
- Date of birth: 22 January 1994 (age 32)
- Place of birth: Guane, Cuba
- Height: 1.64 m (5 ft 5 in)
- Position: Midfielder

Senior career*
Years	Team	Apps	(Gls)
2013–2016	Pinar del Río		
2017	Artemisa		
2018–2019	Pinar del Río		

International career^{‡}
2014–2019	Cuba	14	(0)
- * Club domestic league appearances and goals as of 19 June 2019 ‡ National team caps and goals as of 11 June 2020

Reynaldo Pérez Ramos (born 22 January 1994) is a Cuban football player. He played for Pinar del Río.

== International ==
He made his Cuba national football team debut on 29 March 2014 in a friendly against Indonesia.

He was selected for the 2019 CONCACAF Gold Cup squad.
