= Luismel Morris =

Cuban footballer

Personal information
- Full name: Luismel Morris Calero
- Date of birth: 14 December 1997 (age 28)
- Place of birth: Sierra de Cubitas, Cuba
- Position: Midfielder

Senior career*
Years	Team	Apps	(Gls)
–2019	Camagüey		

International career
2017	Cuba U20		
2018–2019	Cuba	10	(3)
- * Club domestic league appearances and goals

Luismel Morris Calero (born 14 December 1997) is a Cuban professional footballer who plays as a midfielder.

== Career ==
Morris started his career playing for the Cuba U20 team in a 1–1 draw against Japan U19 at the World Youth Festival Toulon. In 2018 Morris made his senior debut in 3–1 loss to Nicaragua. During the qualifiers of the CONCACAF Nations League, he scored twice against Turks and Caicos Islands resulting a large 11–0 win for Cuba.

On 21 June 2019, after Cuba's second match at the 2019 CONCACAF Gold Cup, Morris along two other teammates defected.

== International career ==
=== International goals ===
Scores and results list Cuba's goal tally first.

No.	Date	Venue	Opponent	Score	Result	Competition
1.	29 August 2018	Wildey Astro Turf, Bridgetown, Barbados	Barbados	1–0	2–0	Friendly
2.	12 October 2018	Estadio Pedro Marrero, Havana, Cuba	Turks and Caicos Islands	2–0	11–0	2019–20 CONCACAF Nations League qualification
3.	12 October 2018	Estadio Pedro Marrero, Havana, Cuba	Turks and Caicos Islands	11–0	11–0	2019–20 CONCACAF Nations League qualification
