= Yendry Diaz =

Cuban footballer (born 1987)

Personal information
- Full name: Yendry Diaz Perez
- Date of birth: June 5, 1987 (age 39)
- Place of birth: Matanzas, Cuba
- Height: 6 ft 0 in (1.83 m)
- Position: Defender

Senior career*
Years	Team	Apps	(Gls)
- Matanzas
2009	Real Maryland Monarchs	10	(1)
2010–2011	FC Tampa Bay	25	(1)

International career
- Cuba U20
	Cuba U23	1	(0)
2008	Cuba	2	(0)
- * Club domestic league appearances and goals as of 4 October 2011

Yendry Diaz Perez (born Yendry Díaz Pérez; 5 June 1987) is a Cuban footballer.

== Career ==
=== Professional ===
After several unsuccessful trials with various Major League Soccer clubs, Diaz signed with the Real Maryland Monarchs in the USL Second Division on April 15, 2009.

Diaz signed with the new USSF Division 2 team FC Tampa Bay in January 2010. The club joined the North American Soccer League in 2011. After spending the 2011 season with FC Tampa Bay, the club announced on October 4, 2011, that it would not re-sign Diaz for the 2012 season.

=== International ===
Diaz has numerous caps for Cuba national U-23 football team and made his senior international debut for Cuba in a February 2008 friendly match against Guyana. He earned his second and final cap two days later against the same opposition.

== Personal life ==
Díaz was born to Julio Luis Díaz Hernández and Dinora Pérez and has a younger sister, Mariaelena Diaz.

Diaz defected to the United States from Cuba just after his team's Olympic qualifying game against the United States on March 11, 2008, along with several teammates, including Loanny Cartaya. Diaz apparently slipped out of his hotel in the middle of the night and traveled by car to West Palm Beach.
