= Loanny Cartaya =

Cuban football player

Personal information
- Full name: Loanny Gerardo Cartaya Prieto
- Date of birth: November 12, 1985 (age 40)
- Place of birth: Havana, Cuba
- Height: 5 ft 9 in (1.75 m)
- Position: Midfielder

Senior career*
Years	Team	Apps	(Gls)
2003–2004	Ciudad de la Habana		
2004–2005	Industriales		
2005–2008	Ciudad de la Habana		
2009	Real Maryland Monarchs	9	(0)

International career
2008	Cuba	2	(0)
- * Club domestic league appearances and goals as of 12 April 2010

Loanny Gerardo Cartaya Prieto (born November 12, 1985, in Havana) is a Cuban football player who played for Real Maryland Monarchs in the USL Second Division.

== Club career ==
He played for local sides Industriales, before returning to former youth team Ciudad de la Habana. He scored his first National League goal on 24 September 2005 against provincial rivals FC La Habana.

Cartaya defected to the United States from Cuba just after his team's Olympic qualifying game against the United States on March 11, 2008, along with several teammates, including Yendry Diaz. Cartaya apparently slipped out of his hotel in the middle of the night and traveled by car to West Palm Beach.

After several unsuccessful trials with various Major League Soccer clubs, Cartaya signed with the Real Maryland Monarchs in the USL Second Division on April 15, 2009.

== International career ==
Cartaya has two caps for the senior Cuba national football team, both in friendlies against Guyana in February 2008.
