= Serguei Prado =

Cuban footballer

Personal information
- Full name: Serguei Prado Sañudo
- Date of birth: March 9, 1974 (age 52)
- Place of birth: Santa Clara, Cuba
- Height: 1.83 m (6 ft 0 in)
- Position: Striker

Senior career*
Years	Team	Apps	(Gls)
1995–2008	Villa Clara		(126)
2005	→ Fløy (loan)	8	(0)

International career^{‡}
1999–2005	Cuba	30	(12)

Managerial career
- ?-present: Villa Clara
- * Club domestic league appearances and goals ‡ National team caps and goals as of 1 January 2018

Serguei Prado Sañudo (born 9 March 1974) is a Cuban former professional footballer who played as a striker. He is the highest scorer of Campeonato Nacional de Fútbol de Cuba history, with 126 goals.

== Club career ==
A burly but prolific striker, he played his entire career for local side Villa Clara, except for a season in the Norwegian third tier with Fløy alongside compatriot Osmín Hernández.

Back in Cuba, he was the league's top goalscorer in 2003 and 2005. He is the Cuban league's all-time top goalscorer with 126.

== International career ==
Prado made his international debut for Cuba in a May 1999 Caribbean Cup qualification match against Bermuda and has earned a total of 30 caps, scoring 12 goals. He represented his country in 6 FIFA World Cup qualification matches (1 goal). To his disappointment, he was never included for a CONCACAF Gold Cup final tournament.

His final international was a January 2005 CONCACAF Gold Cup qualifier against Haiti.

=== International goals ===
Scores and results list Cuba's goal tally first.

Number	Date	Location	Opponent	Score	Result	Competition
1	13 June 1999	Hasely Crawford Stadium, Port of Spain, Trinidad and Tobago	Trinidad and Tobago	1-1	1-2	1999 Caribbean Cup
2	10 October 1999	Los Angeles Memorial Coliseum, Los Angeles, United States	El Salvador	2-1	3-1	2000 CONCACAF Gold Cup qualification play-off
3	5 March 2000	Estadio Pedro Marrero, Havana, Cuba	Cayman Islands	3-0	4-0	2002 FIFA World Cup qualification
4	9 March 2000	Estadio Pedro Marrero, Havana, Cuba	Nicaragua		4-0	Friendly match
5	2 July 2000	National Stadium, Kingston, Jamaica	Jamaica	1-0	1-1	Friendly match
6	4 July 2000	Marvin Lee Stadium, Macoya, Tunapuna–Piarco, Trinidad and Tobago	Trinidad and Tobago	1-0	1-4	Friendly match
7	8 April 2001	Bourda, Georgetown, Guyana	Guyana	2-0	3-0	2001 Caribbean Cup qualification
8	18 May 2001	Marvin Lee Stadium, Macoya, Tunapuna–Piarco, Trinidad and Tobago	Saint Kitts and Nevis	1-1	1-1	2001 Caribbean Cup
9	5 August 2001	Estadio Pedro Marrero, Havana, Cuba	Panama	1-0	1-0	2002 CONCACAF Gold Cup Qualifying play-off
10	1 December 2002	Truman Bodden Sports Complex, George Town, Cayman Islands	Dominican Republic	2-1	2-1	2003 CONCACAF Gold Cup qualification

== Futsal management ==
In 2014, Prado took charge of the Villa Clara futsal team after coaching the Deportivo Anzoátegui futsal team in Venezuela for two years.
