= Ariel Betancourt =

Cuban footballer (born 1970)

Personal information
- Full name: Ariel Betancourt Cepero
- Date of birth: 30 September 1970 (age 56)
- Place of birth: Cuba
- Position: Striker

Senior career*
Years	Team	Apps	(Gls)
1992–2002	Villa Clara		(122)
1999	→ Bonner SC (loan)		

International career
1999–2002	Cuba	11	(0)
- * Club domestic league appearances and goals

Ariel Betancourt Cepero (born 30 September 1970) is a Cuban former footballer who played as a striker.

== Early life ==
Betancourt was born in 1970 in Cuba. He started playing football at the age of six.

== Club career ==
Betancourt started his career with Cuban side Villa Clara. He has been the third-highest all-time Cuban top flight scorer with 122 goals.

== International career ==
Betancourt represented Cuba internationally. He played for the Cuba national football team at the 2002 CONCACAF Gold Cup.

== Personal life ==
Betancourt has a brother. He has been nicknamed "Jimagua".
