= Jean Carlos Rodríguez =

Cuban footballer

Personal information
- Full name: Jean Carlos Rodríguez Quiñones
- Date of birth: 27 May 1999 (age 27)
- Place of birth: Viñales, Cuba
- Height: 1.76 m (5 ft 9 in)
- Position: Midfielder

Team information
- Current team: Pinar del Río

Senior career*
Years	Team	Apps	(Gls)
2018–	Pinar del Río		

International career^{‡}
2018	Cuba U20	5	(3)
2019–	Cuba	9	(0)
- * Club domestic league appearances and goals as of 23 June 2019 ‡ National team caps and goals as of 11 June 2020

Jean Carlos Rodríguez Quiñones (born 27 May 1999) is a Cuban football player. He plays for Pinar del Río.

== International career ==
He made his Cuba national football team debut on 23 June 2019 in a 2019 CONCACAF Gold Cup game against Canada.
