= Julio Pichardo =

Cuban footballer (born 1990)

Personal information
- Full name: Julio Enrique Pichardo Ramos
- Date of birth: January 10, 1990 (age 36)
- Place of birth: Colombia, Cuba
- Height: 1.85 m (6 ft 1 in)
- Position: Goalkeeper

Team information
- Current team: Five Islands

Senior career*
| Years | Team | Apps | (Gls) |
| 2010–2016 | Las Tunas | | |
| 2016– | Five Islands | | |

International career^{‡}
| 2010–2012 | Cuba | 2 | (0) |
- * Club domestic league appearances and goals ‡ National team caps and goals as of 1 January 2018

Julio Enrique Pichardo Ramos (born 10 January 1990) is a Cuban football goalkeeper.

== Club career ==
Pichardo moved abroad to play for Antiguan side Five Islands alongside compatriots Sánder Fernández, Yoandir Puga, Armando Oramas and Yusvani Caballero.

== International career ==
Pichardo made his international debut for Cuba in a June 2011 CONCACAF Gold Cup match against El Salvador and has earned a total of 2 caps, scoring no goals. His second cap was a November 2012 Caribbean Cup qualification match against Trinidad & Tobago.
