= Five Islands F.C. =

Association football club in Antigua and Barbuda

- Ground: Five Islands School Ground
- Capacity: 200
- Chairman: Cyrus Randall
- Manager: Darién Díaz
- League: ABFA Premier Division
- 2024–25: 11th
- Website: https://www.fiveislandsfc.com
Home colours	Away colours

Five Islands Football Club is an Antiguan professional football club based in the northwestern town of Five Islands Village. The club presently competes in the Antigua and Barbuda Premier Division, the highest tier of football in Antigua and Barbuda.

The club finished second during the 2017–18 Antigua and Barbuda Premier Division, their best finish since 1978, where they won the league title.

== Squad ==
As of 6 June 2018

Note: Flags indicate national team as defined under FIFA eligibility rules; some limited exceptions apply. Players may hold more than one non-FIFA nationality.

No.	Pos.	Nation	Player
—	GK	CUB	Julio Pichardo
—	GK	ANT	Charly Dolsurin
—	GK	ANT	Jayden Martin
—	DF	CUB	Yosvani Caballero
—	DF	ENG	Leroy Graham
—	DF	ANT	Ashton Fagan
—	DF	ANT	Damian Francis
—	MF	ANT	Alex Phillip
—	MF	CUB	Armando Oramas
—	MF	ANT	Brandon Emmanuel

No.	Pos.	Nation	Player
—	MF	ANT	Leon Joseph
—	MF	ANT	Brandon Emanuel
—	MF	ANT	Shane Joseph
—	MF	JAM	Marvin Thomas
—	FW	CUB	Sánder Fernández
—	FW	CUB	Yoandir Puga
—	FW	ANT	Samuel Semper
—	FW	ANT	Ken Murray
—	FW	ANT	Jamar Peters
—	FW	MEX	Rafael Torres Rizo

== Honors ==
- ABFA Premier Division
  - Winners (1): 1977–78
  - Runners-up (1): 2017–18
  - Best player: Rafael Torres Rizo (6 goals)
