= Lionis Martínez =

Cuban footballer

Personal information
- Full name: Lionis Martínez Ramírez
- Date of birth: 2 March 1989 (age 37)
- Place of birth: Santiago de Cuba, Cuba
- Height: 1.69 m (5 ft 7 in)
- Position: Defender

Team information
- Current team: FC Santiago de Cuba
- Number: 15

Senior career*
Years	Team	Apps	(Gls)
2008–	FC Santiago de Cuba		

International career^{‡}
2018–	Cuba	12	(0)
- * Club domestic league appearances and goals ‡ National team caps and goals as of 11 June 2020

Lionis Martínez Ramírez (born 2 March 1989) is a Cuban football player. He plays for FC Santiago de Cuba.

== International ==
He made his Cuba national football team on 23 March 2018 in a friendly against Nicaragua, as a starter.

He was selected for the country's 2019 CONCACAF Gold Cup squad.
