= Brian Rosales =

Cuban footballer (born 1995)

Personal information
- Full name: Brian Rosales Sarracent
- Date of birth: 7 March 1995 (age 31)
- Place of birth: Cuba
- Height: 1.70 m (5 ft 7 in)
- Position: Defender

Senior career*
| Years | Team | Apps | (Gls) |
| –2015 | Matanzas | | |
| 2017 | Tulsa | 0 | (0) |
| 2020–2021 | Fort Lauderdale CF | 30 | (0) |

International career^{‡}
| 2013–2015 | Cuba U20 | 8 | (0) |
| 2015 | Cuba U23 | 1 | (0) |
- * Club domestic league appearances and goals as of 31 October 2021 ‡ National team caps and goals as of 18 July 2020

Brian Rosales Sarracent (born 7 March 1995) is a Cuban footballer who plays as a defender.
