= Bidrece Azor =

Haitian-Italian football player (born 1988)

Personal information
- Date of birth: March 14, 1988 (age 38)
- Place of birth: Delmas, Haiti
- Height: 1.80 m (5 ft 11 in)
- Position: Striker

Team information
- Current team: ACD Poggese

Youth career
- 2003–2004: S.P.A.L.
- 2004–2005: Lecce

Senior career*
Years	Team	Apps	(Gls)
2006–2007	Sampdoria		
2007–2008	Teramo		
2008	Castelnuovo		
2008–2009	Fanfulla		
2009–2010	Boca Pietri Carpi		
2010	Copparese		
2010–2011	Comacchio Lidi		
2011	Correggese		
2011–2012	Masi Torello		
2012–2013	Bondenese		
2013–	ACD Poggese		

International career
2008–	Haiti U-23	1	(0)
- * Club domestic league appearances and goals

Bidrece Azor (born 14 March 1988) is a Haitian-Italian football player, who currently plays for ACD Poggese in Italy.

== Early years ==
Azor was born in Delmas, Haiti. He holds Italian citizenship.

== International career ==
He played with the National Under-23. His goals have allowed Haiti to overcome the first two rounds of the CONCACAF U-23 Championship valid for qualifying for the 2008 Summer Olympics in Beijing.
