= Alexei Zuáznabar =

Cuban footballer

Personal information
- Full name: Alexei Zuáznabar Grandales
- Date of birth: 10 March 1985 (age 41)
- Place of birth: Guantánamo, Cuba
- Height: 1.80 m (5 ft 11 in)
- Position: Forward

Team information
- Current team: Guantánamo

Senior career*
Years	Team	Apps	(Gls)
2006–	Guantánamo		

International career^{‡}
2012–	Cuba	10	(0)
- * Club domestic league appearances and goals ‡ National team caps and goals as of 1 January 2018

Alexei Zuáznabar Grandales (born 10 March 1985) is a Cuban international footballer.

== Club career ==
Playing for his provincial side Guantánamo, he was the league's top goalscorer in 2007.

== International career ==
He made his debut for Cuba during the 2012 Caribbean Cup on 14 November 2012 in a 5-0 win over Suriname and has, as of January 2018, earned a total of 10 caps, scoring no goals. He was called up but did not feature in any FIFA World Cup qualification match. He was also named in the title winning final round squad that qualified for the 2013 CONCACAF Gold Cup.
