= FC Ciudad de La Habana =

Cuban football club

Ciudad de La Habana
- Full name: FC Ciudad de La Habana
- Ground: Estadio Pedro Marrero; Havana
- Capacity: 20,000
- League: Campeonato Nacional de Fútbol
Home colours

Ciudad de La Habana is a Cuban professional football team playing at the top level of Cuban football. It is based in Havana. Their home stadium is Estadio Pedro Marrero.
