= Liga Nacional de Cuba =

Cuban association football league

- Organising body: Asociación de Fútbol de Cuba
- Founded: 1912; 114 years ago
- First season: 1912
- Country: Cuba
- Confederation: CONCACAF
- Number of clubs: 16
- Level on pyramid: 1
- Domestic cup: Supercopa Nacional de Fútbol de Cuba
- International cup: CONCACAF Caribbean Shield
- Current champions: FC La Habana (2025)
- Most championships: Villa Clara (14)
- Top scorer: Serguei Prado (126 goals)
- Broadcaster(s): GolCuba (YouTube)
- Current: 2025 Campeonato Nacional de Fútbol de Cuba

The Liga Nacional de Fútbol de Cuba is the top football division in Cuba. Currently, it is contested by 16 clubs and is divided into two tournaments – "Apertura" and "Clausura", with the last being the championship tournament. The champions of each tournament, decided via a playoff match ("Final"), qualify for Supercopa Nacional de Fútbol de Cuba. The league currently has a fixed membership with each club being a representative of a Cuban province, which makes it one of the football leagues that does not have a promotion and relegation system.

== Competition format ==
Torneo Apertura

In "Torneo Apertura", the 16 clubs are geographically divided into the "Grupo Occidental" and "Grupo Oriental", with 8 clubs each, and playing against its clubs' group on a double round-robin basis a total of 14 games. The top three clubs of each group advance to the "Torneo Clausura", with the winners of each group also playing a final match ("Torneo Apertura Final").

Torneo Clausura and Campeonato Nacional de Liga de Fútbol de Cuba

In "Torneo Clausura", the 6 qualified clubs play against each other on a double round-robin basis a total of 10 games. The top two clubs play a final match ("Torneo Clausura Final") that also crowns the "Campeonato Nacional de Liga de Fútbol de Cuba" champion.

Supercopa Nacional de Fútbol de Cuba qualification

The "Campeonato Nacional de Liga de Fútbol de Cuba" champion/"Torneo Clausura" winner and "Torneo Apertura" winner qualify for "Supercopa Nacional de Fútbol de Cuba", a super cup match that crowns the "Supercopa Nacional de Fútbol de Cuba" champion.

== Clubs ==
Locations of the 2025 Liga Nacional de Fútbol de Cuba teams
Group A
Group B
Group C
Group D

In 2025, the tournament had 16 teams, one for each province of Cuba, plus the special municipality of the Isla de la Juventud. The teams were split into 4 groups, based on location, and in the Apertura stage of the tournament, played each team in their group 4 times, making the total number of games in the Apertura stage 12 for each team. The four groups are:

- Group A: FC Artemisa, FC Isla de La Juventud, FC La Habana, and FC Pinar del Río
- Group B: FC Cienfuegos, FC Matanzas, FC Mayabeque, and FC Villa Clara
- Group C: FC Camagüey, FC Ciego de Ávila, FC Las Tunas, and FC Sancti Spíritus
- Group D: CF Granma, FC Guantánamo, FC Holguín, and FC Santiago de Cuba

== List of champions ==
There have been 100 titles won with three years not having a championship. The winner of the greatest number of titles is FC Villa Clara with 14 wins. Centro Gallego (La Habana) and Real Iberia (La Habana) (including Iberia) each have eight wins, Juventud Asturiana (La Habana) and FC Pinar del Río each have seven wins, FC Ciudad de La Habana (without La Habana/La Habana FC) and Deportivo San Francisco each have six wins, FC Ciego de Ávila, Granjeros and Deportivo Hispano América (La Habana) each have five wins, FC Cienfuegos, Industriales (La Habana), and FC La Habana (including La Habana FC) each have four wins, Santiago de Cuba and Mordazo has three wins, Azucareros, Deportivo Puentes Grandes, and Rovers AC (La Habana) each have two wins, and FC Artemisa, FC Camagüey, Casino Español, Cerro (La Habana), Deportivo Español (Santiago de Cuba), Diablos Rojos (Santiago de Cuba), Fortuna, CD Hatüey (La Habana), FC Holguín, and Olimpia each have only one win.

Season	Champion	Runner-up
1912	Rovers Athletic	
1913	SC Hatuey	
1914	Rovers Athletic	
1915	Hispano América	
1916	La Habana	
1917	Real Iberia	
1918	Real Iberia	
1919	Hispano América	
1920	Hispano América	
1921	Hispano América	
1922	Real Iberia	
1923	Real Iberia	
1924	Olimpia	
1925	Fortuna	
1926	Real Iberia	
1927	Juventud Asturiana	
1928	Real Iberia	
1929	Real Iberia	
1930	Deportivo Español	
1931	Centro Gallego	
1932	Centro Gallego	
1933	Juventud Asturiana	
1934	Real Iberia	
1935	Juventud Asturiana	
1936	Juventud Asturiana	
1937	Centro Gallego	
1938	Centro Gallego	
1939	Centro Gallego	
1940	Centro Gallego	
1941	Juventud Asturiana	
1942	Puentes Grandes	
1943	Puentes Grandes	
1944	Juventud Asturiana	
1945	Centro Gallego	
1946	No tournament	
1947	Centro Gallego	
1948	Juventud Asturiana	
1949	Diablos Rojos	
1950	Hispano América	
1951	San Francisco	
1952	San Francisco	
1953	San Francisco	
1954	San Francisco	
1955	San Francisco	
1956	Casino Español	
1957	San Francisco	
1958	Deportivo Mordazo	
1959	Deportivo Mordazo	
1960	El Cerro	
1961	Deportivo Mordazo	
1962	No tournament	
1963	Industriales	
1964	Industriales	
1965	La Habana	
1966	La Habana	
1967	La Habana	
1968	Granjeros	
1969	Granjeros	
1970	Granjeros	
1971	No tournament	
1972	Industriales	
1973	Industriales	
1974	Azucareros	
1975	Granjeros	
1976	Azucareros	
1977	Granjeros	
1978–79	Ciudad de La Habana	Villa Clara
1979	Ciudad de La Habana	Villa Clara
1980	Villa Clara	Ciudad de La Habana
1981	Villa Clara	Pinar del Río
1982	Villa Clara	Cienfuegos
1983	Villa Clara	Pinar del Río
1984	Ciudad de La Habana	Cienfuegos
1985	Cienfuegos	Villa Clara
1986	Villa Clara	Fuerzas Armadas Revolucionarias
1987	Pinar del Río	Villa Clara
1988–89	Pinar del Río	Fuerzas Armadas Revolucionarias
1989–90	Pinar del Río	Fuerzas Armadas Revolucionarias
1990–91	Cienfuegos	Villa Clara
1991–92	Pinar del Río	Ciego de Ávila
1992	Villa Clara	Pinar del Río
1993	Ciego de Ávila	Santiago de Cuba
1994	Ciudad de La Habana	Santiago de Cuba
1995	Pinar del Río	Ciego de Ávila
1996	Villa Clara	Cienfuegos
1997	Villa Clara	Pinar del Río
1998	Ciudad de La Habana	Villa Clara
1999–00	Pinar del Río	Ciudad de La Habana
2000–01	Ciudad de La Habana	Villa Clara
2001–02	Pinar del Río	Granma
2002–03	Villa Clara	Ciudad de La Habana
2003	Pinar del Río	Villa Clara
2004–05	Villa Clara	Pinar del Río
2005–06	Holguín	Ciudad de La Habana
2006–07	Pinar del Río	Villa Clara
2007–08	Cienfuegos	Ciudad de La Habana
2008–09	Cienfuegos	Villa Clara
2009–10	Ciego de Ávila	Camagüey
2010–11	Villa Clara	Guantánamo
2011–12	Villa Clara	Camagüey
2013	Villa Clara	Pinar del Río
2014	Ciego de Ávila	Villa Clara
2015	Camagüey	Cienfuegos
2016	Villa Clara	Guantánamo
2017	Santiago de Cuba	Camagüey
2018	Santiago de Cuba	Ciego de Ávila
2019	Santiago de Cuba	La Habana
2019–20	Abandoned due to COVID-19 pandemic	
2020–21	Not held due to COVID-19 pandemic	
2022	Artemisa	Santiago de Cuba
2023	Cienfuegos	Holguín
2024	Cancelled	
2025	La Habana	Santiago de Cuba

== Performance by club ==
Club	City	Titles	Seasons won
Villa Clara	Zulueta, Villa Clara	14	1980, 1981, 1982, 1983, 1986, 1992, 1996, 1997, 2002–03, 2004–05, 2010–11, 2011–12, 2013, 2016
Centro Gallego	La Habana	8	1931, 1932, 1937, 1938, 1939, 1940, 1945, 1947
Real Iberia	La Habana	8	1917, 1918, 1922, 1923, 1926, 1928, 1929, 1934
Juventud Asturiana	La Habana	7	1927, 1933, 1935, 1936, 1941, 1944, 1948
Pinar del Río	Pinar del Río	7	1987, 1988–89, 1989–90, 1991–92, 1995, 1999–00, 2006–07
Camagüey	Camagüey	6	1968, 1969, 1970, 1975, 1977, 2015
Ciudad de La Habana	La Habana	6	1978–79, 1979, 1984, 1994, 1998, 2000–01
San Francisco	La Habana	6	1951, 1952, 1953, 1954, 1955, 1957
La Habana	La Habana	5	1916, 1965, 1966, 1967, 2025
Cienfuegos	Cienfuegos	5	1985, 1990–91, 2007–08, 2008–09, 2023
Ciego de Ávila	Ciego de Ávila	5	1993, 2001–02, 2003, 2009–10, 2014
Hispano América	La Habana	5	1915, 1919, 1920, 1921, 1950
Industriales	La Habana	4	1963, 1964, 1972, 1973
Deportivo Mordazo	La Habana	3	1958, 1959, 1961
Santiago de Cuba	Santiago de Cuba	3	2017, 2018, 2019
Azucareros	Zulueta, Las Villas	2	1974, 1976
Puentes Grandes	La Habana	2	1942, 1943
Rovers Athletic	La Habana	2	1912, 1914
Artemisa	Guanajay	1	2022
Casino Español	La Habana	1	1956
El Cerro	La Habana	1	1960
Deportivo Español	Santiago de Cuba	1	1930
Diablos Rojos	Santiago de Cuba	1	1949
Fortuna	La Habana	1	1925
SC Hatüey	La Habana	1	1913
Holguín	Holguín	1	2005–06
Olimpia	La Habana	1	1924

== Best scorers ==
=== Total ===
As of 12 December 2025

Goals
Rank	Player	Years	Goals	Club(s)
1	(Cuba) Serguei Prado	1995–2008	126	FC Villa Clara
2	(Cuba) Lester Moré	1996–2007	123	FC Ciego de Ávila; FC Villa Clara
3	(Cuba) Ariel Betancourt	1992–2002	122	FC Villa Clara
4	(Cuba) Yoandir Puga	?–2017; 2022–	120	FC Isla de La Juventud; FC Villa Clara; FC La Habana
5	(Cuba) Ruslan Batista	2004–2017; 2018–	116	CF Granma; FC Santiago de Cuba
6	(Cuba) Armando Coroneaux	2003–2022	112	FC Camagüey
7	(Cuba) Sánder Fernández	2008–2020	112	FC Ciego de Ávila
8	(Cuba) Héctor "El Indio" Ramírez		109	FC Holguín
9	(Cuba) Roberto Pereira	1970–1986	108	FC Villa Clara
11	(Cuba) Geovany Ayala		106	FC Las Tunas
11	(Cuba) Ramón Núñez	1972–1987	106	FC Las Tunas

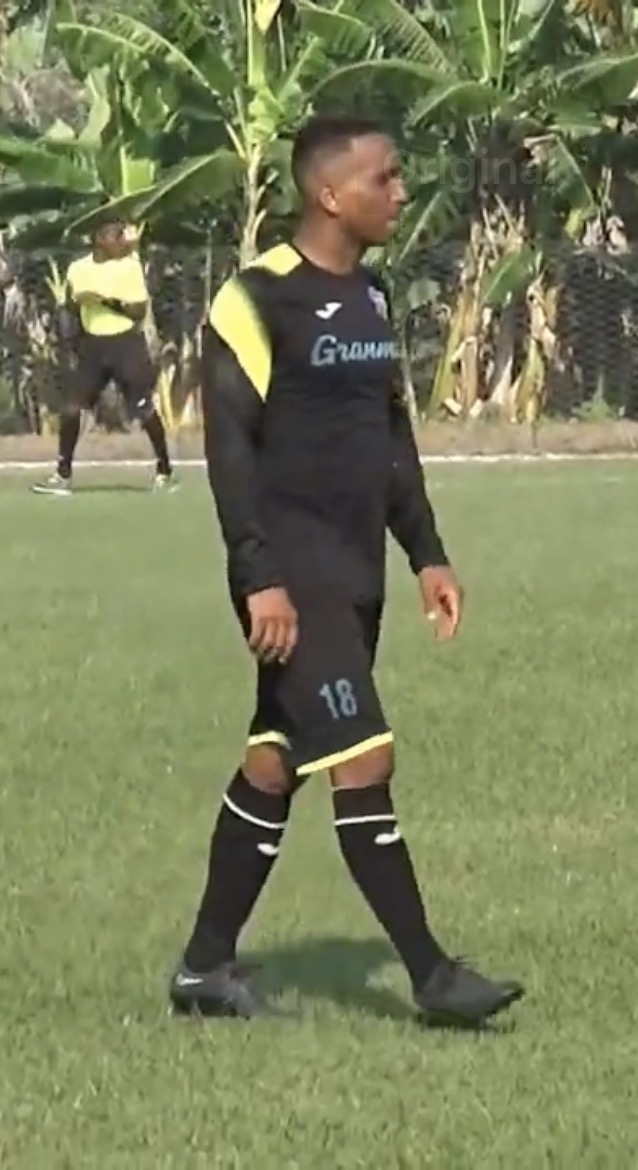
Ruslan Batista playing for CF Granma in 2023

=== Per season ===
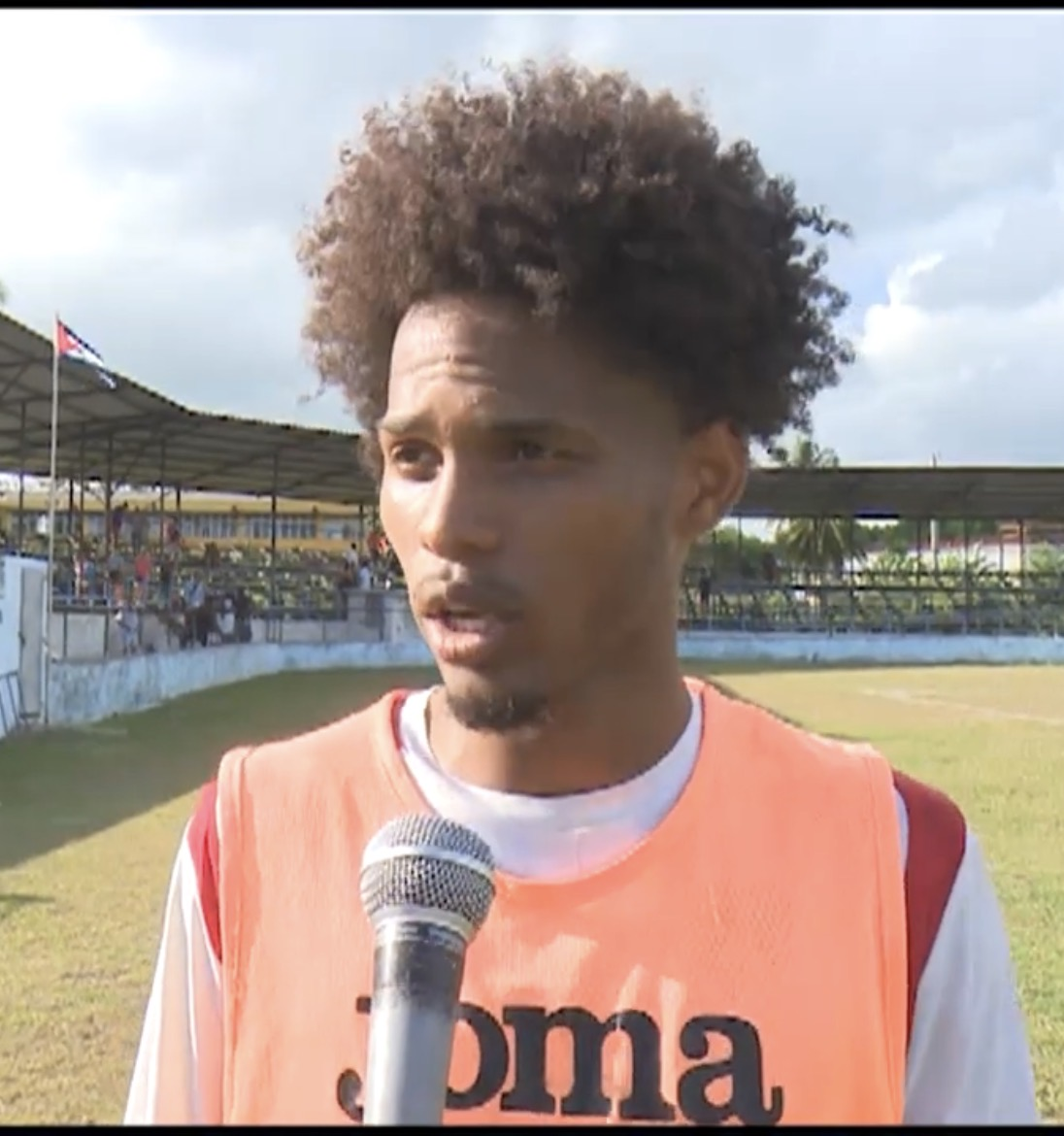
Cristian Valiente, top scorer for the 2023 Liga Nacional de Cuba, in a post-match interview for FC Holguín on Perlavisión

Year	Best Scorers	Club	Goals
1978–79	Urbano Ankle	FC Las Tunas	14
1979	(Cuba) Roberto Maya-Pereira (Cuba) Regino Delgado (Cuba) Ramón Núñez (Cuba) Carlos Azcuy	FC Villa Clara; FC Villa Clara; FC Las Tunas; FC Ciudad de La Habana	7
1980	(Cuba) Regino Delgado	FC Villa Clara	9
1981	Agustín Pérez	FC Camagüey	8
1982	(Cuba) Roberto Maya-Pereira (Cuba) Dagoberto "El Tibi" Lara	FC Villa Clara; FC Cienfuegos	8
1983	(Cuba) Frank Perez Espinosa	FC Cienfuegos	9
1984	(Cuba) Andrés Roldan	FC Cienfuegos	14
1985	(Cuba) Roberto Maya-Pereira	FC Villa Clara	19
1986	(Cuba) Osvaldo Alonso	FC Pinar del Río	19
1987	(Cuba) Guillermo Matos	FC Cienfuegos	14
1988–89	(Cuba) Frank Perez Espinosa (Cuba) Raimundo "Ruso" García	FC Cienfuegos; FC Pinar del Río	6
1989–90	(Cuba) Raul Depestre	FC Villa Clara	7
1990–91	(Cuba) Camilo Kindelán (Cuba) William Sánchez	FC Ciudad de La Habana; FC Santiago de Cuba	5
1991–92	(Cuba) Raimundo "Ruso" García	FC Pinar del Río	5
1992	(Cuba) Ariel Betancourt	FC Villa Clara	8
1993	(Cuba) Reemberto Piedra	FC Ciego de Ávila	5
1994	(Cuba) Raimundo "Ruso" García	FC Pinar del Río	7
1995	(Cuba) Raimundo "Ruso" García	FC Pinar del Río	4
1996	(Cuba) Osmín Hernández	FC Pinar del Río	7
1997	(Cuba) Osmín Hernández	FC Pinar del Río	5
1998	(Cuba) Ariel Betancourt	FC Villa Clara	14
1999–00	(Cuba) Lester Moré	FC Ciego de Ávila	13
2000–01	(Cuba) Ariel Betancourt	FC Villa Clara	19
2001–02	(Cuba) Ariel Betancourt	FC Villa Clara	17
2002–03	(Cuba) Serguei Prado	FC Villa Clara	22
2003	(Cuba) Lester Moré	FC Ciego de Ávila	32
2004–05	(Cuba) Serguei Prado	FC Villa Clara	17
2005–06	(Cuba) Yordanis Tielves	FC Matanzas	11
2006–07	(Cuba) Alexei Zuáznabar	FC Guantánamo	15
2007–08	(Cuba) Geovanni Ayala	FC Las Tunas	22
2008–09	Maykel Celada (Cuba) Osmani Montero	FC Las Tunas; FC Camagüey	16
2009–10	(Cuba) Sánder Fernández	FC Ciego de Ávila	29
2011	(Cuba) Aliannis Urgellés	FC Guantánamo	
2012	(Cuba) Roberto Linares	FC Villa Clara	12
2013	(Cuba) Yénier Márquez	FC Villa Clara	16
2014	(Cuba) Yoandir Puga	FC Villa Clara	13
2015	(Cuba) Sánder Fernández	FC Ciego de Ávila	15
2016	(Cuba) Sánder Fernández	FC Ciego de Ávila	16
2017	(Cuba) Sánder Fernández	FC Ciego de Ávila	13
2018	(Cuba) Ruslan Batista	CF Granma	11
2018	(Cuba) Allan Pérez	FC Ciego de Avila	11
2019	(Cuba) Jorge Villalón	FC Santiago de Cuba	15
2019-20	(Cuba) Sánder Fernández	FC Ciego de Ávila	19
2022	(Cuba) Yasnay Rivero	FC Artemisa	21
2023	(Cuba) Cristian Carlos Valiente	FC Holguín	12
2025	(Cuba) Randy Valier	FC Guantánamo	14

== Multiple hat-tricks ==
Rank	Country	Player	Hat-tricks
1	(Cuba)	Geovanni Ayala	6
2	(Cuba)	Sánder Fernández	5
3	(Cuba)	Reinier Alcantara	2
3	(Cuba)	Disney Aquino	2
3	(Cuba)	Lester More	2
3	(Cuba)	Hensi Muñoz	2
3	(Cuba)	Yoandir Puga	2
8	(Cuba)	Ciprian Alfonso	1
8	(Cuba)	Ruslan Batista	1
8	(Cuba)	Maikel Celada	1
8	(Cuba)	Kanier Dranget	1
8	(Cuba)	Maykel Galindo	1
8	(Cuba)	Andro Martinez	1
8	(Cuba)	Osmani Montero	1
8	(Cuba)	Eduardo Morales	1
8	(Cuba)	Jensy Muñoz	1
8	(Cuba)	Yaisniel Napoles	1
8	(Cuba)	Ramon Ocaña	1
8	(Cuba)	Diosney Pez	1
8	(Cuba)	Yordanis Tielves	1
