= Sánder Fernández =

Cuban footballer (born 1987)

Personal information
- Full name: Sánder Fernandez Cervantes
- Date of birth: July 19, 1987 (age 39)
- Place of birth: Morón, Cuba
- Height: 1.69 m (5 ft 7 in)
- Position: Striker

Team information
- Current team: Five Islands

Senior career*
Years	Team	Apps	(Gls)
2008–2020	Ciego de Ávila		(110)
2016–18	Five Islands		(36)

International career^{‡}
2010–	Cuba	14	(0)
- * Club domestic league appearances and goals ‡ National team caps and goals as of 1 April 2018

Sánder Fernández Cervantes (born 19 July 1987) is a former Cuban footballer, who played for Five Islands in Antigua and Barbuda and FC Ciego de Ávila in Cuba.

== Club career ==
Nicknamed Keko, he played for local provincial side Ciego de Ávila but moved abroad to play for Antiguan side Five Islands alongside compatriots Julio Pichardo, Yoandir Puga, Armando Oramas and Yusvani Caballero and became the league's goalscorer with 14 goals.

In Cuba, he was the league's top goalscorer in 2010, 2015 and 2016.

== International career ==
Fernández made his international debut for Cuba in an October 2010 friendly match against Panama and has earned a total of 12 caps, scoring no goals. He represented his country in 1 FIFA World Cup qualification match.

His final international was a September 2012 World Cup qualifier against Honduras.

== Personal life ==
His brother Reysánder also played for the national team, before defecting to the United States.
