= FC Holguín =

Cuban football club

- Nickname: Las Panteras (The Panthers)
- Ground: Estadio Luis Augusto Turcios Lima, Banes, Cuba
- Capacity: 1,000
- League: Torneo de Ascenso
- 2014: Campeonato Nacional, 9th (relegated)
Home colours

FC Holguín is a Cuban football club based in Banes, Holguín Province. Its home stadium is the 1,000-capacity Estadio Luis Augusto Turcios Lima. In 2014, it was relegated from the Cuban first division.

== Current squad ==
Note: Flags indicate national team as defined under FIFA eligibility rules; some limited exceptions apply. Players may hold more than one non-FIFA nationality.

No.	Pos.	Nation	Player
—	GK	CUB	Ernel Castillo
—	GK	CUB	Nelson Johnston
—	DF	CUB	Carlos Cespedes
—	DF	CUB	Yoanqui Acosta
—	DF	CUB	Ismel Rodriguez
—	DF	CUB	Luis Enrique Alapon
—	DF	CUB	Simon Asea
—	MF	CUB	Mario Sergio Ramirez
—	MF	CUB	Laster Tamayo

No.	Pos.	Nation	Player
—	MF	CUB	Jorge Zaldivar
—	MF	CUB	Fernando Chapman
—	MF	CUB	Julio Cesar Suarez
—	MF	CUB	Luis Angel Castro
—	FW	CUB	Reiner Chavez
—	FW	CUB	Yoni Alvarez
—	FW	CUB	Vismel Gomez
—	FW	CUB	Raudelis Gonzalez
—	FW	CUB	Lisandro Hay Batista

== Achievements ==
- Campeonato Nacional de Fútbol de Cuba: 1

2006
