= FC Artemisa =

Association football club in Cuba

Artemisa
- Full name: Fútbol Club Artemisa
- Founded: 2011
- Ground: Estadio de Guanajay; Guanajay (Artemisa Province, Cuba)
- Capacity: 3,000
- League: Campeonato Nacional de Fútbol

Fútbol Club Artemisa is a Cuban professional football club based in Guanajay, Artemisa, Cuba. The club currently competes in the Campeonato Nacional de Fútbol, the top division of Cuban football. Estadio de Guanajay, which has capacity for 3,000 people, is their home venue.

== Current squad ==
Note: Flags indicate national team as defined under FIFA eligibility rules; some limited exceptions apply. Players may hold more than one non-FIFA nationality.

No.	Pos.	Nation	Player
—	GK	CUB	Diosvelis Guerra
—	GK	CUB	Joan Cantero
—	GK	CUB	Yoel Pozo
—	GK	CUB	Raifel Morell
—	DF	CUB	Carlos Loredo
—	DF	CUB	Roberto Torres
—	DF	CUB	Osniel Ramos
—	DF	CUB	Alejandro Santos
—	DF	CUB	Adrián Noa
—	DF	CUB	Yefren Delgado
—	DF	CUB	Lázaro Piloto
—	DF	CUB	Lázaro Bello
—	DF	CUB	Yeikol Piloto
—	MF	CUB	Allan Pérez

No.	Pos.	Nation	Player
—	MF	CUB	Alejandro Cruz
—	MF	CUB	Lázaro Ramos
—	MF	CUB	Yoelvis González
—	MF	CUB	Kendri Pérez
—	MF	CUB	Osvel Alonso
—	MF	CUB	Leonel Vázquez
—	MF	CUB	Yordan Alvizar
—	MF	CUB	Harold Castillo
—	MF	CUB	Fredy Suárez
—	FW	CUB	Yansiel Reinoso
—	FW	CUB	Carlos Amores
—	FW	CUB	Lázaro Garrido
—	FW	CUB	Leonardo Veliz
—	FW	CUB	Liyuan Noda
