= FC Mayabeque =

Cuban football club

- Full name: Fútbol Club Mayabeque
- Founded: 2011; 15 years ago
- Ground: Estadio Héroes del Mayabeque Güines (Mayabeque Province, Cuba)
- League: Campeonato Nacional de Fútbol
Home colours

FC Mayabeque is a Cuban football team based in the town of Güines. In the 2013 season, the club competed in the Campeonato Nacional de Fútbol de Cuba, the highest level of football in Cuba.
