= FC Guantánamo =

Cuban football club

- Nickname: Los del Guaso (The Guaso ones)
- Ground: Estadio Rogelio Palacios, Guantánamo, Cuba
- Capacity: 5,000
- Manager: Geordenis Gómez
- League: Liga Nacional de Cuba
- 2025 Clausura: 3rd
Home colours

FC Guantánamo is a Cuban football team playing in the Cuban National Football League and representing Guantánamo Province. They play their home games at 5,000-capacity Estadio Rogelio Palacios.

It finished as runner-up to Villa Clara in the 2010–11 season.

== Current squad ==
Note: Flags indicate national team as defined under FIFA eligibility rules; some limited exceptions apply. Players may hold more than one non-FIFA nationality.

No.	Pos.	Nation	Player
—	GK	CUB	Yenier Zamora
—	GK	CUB	Arturo Pozo
—	GK	CUB	Luis Ángel López
—	DF	CUB	Hánier Dranguet
—	DF	CUB	Yonilei Ramos
—	DF	CUB	Rey Joubert
—	DF	CUB	Josè Antonio Salazar
—	DF	CUB	Misael Pérez
—	DF	CUB	Dairon Delgado
—	DF	CUB	Joribel Sánchez
—	DF	CUB	José Alejandro Aguirre
—	DF	CUB	Leonardo Correa
—	DF	CUB	Orlendis Negret
—	DF	CUB	Ronier Figueroa
—	MF	CUB	Alberto Gómez
—	MF	CUB	Osmani Mosqueda
—	MF	CUB	Alain Decós
—	MF	CUB	George Guibert

No.	Pos.	Nation	Player
—	MF	CUB	Edson Argote
—	MF	CUB	Yosvani López
—	MF	CUB	Pedro González
—	MF	CUB	Rigoberto Naranjo
—	MF	CUB	Onasis López
—	MF	CUB	Ángel Manuel Rodríguez
—	MF	CUB	Jean Mosqueda
—	MF	CUB	José Julián Rodríguez
—	FW	CUB	Alexei Zuáznabar
—	FW	CUB	Randy Valier
—	FW	CUB	Samuel Street Betancourt
—	FW	CUB	Juan Carlos Hernández
—	FW	CUB	Frank Cisneros
—	FW	CUB	José Ángel González
—	FW	CUB	Loanne Palacio
—	FW	CUB	René Terry
—	FW	CUB	Isael Vega
