= Cuba national under-20 football team =

National association football team

Cuba
- Association: Football Association of Cuba
- Confederation: CONCACAF (North America)
- Sub-confederation: CFU (Caribbean)
- Head coach: Pedro Pablo Pereira
- FIFA code: CUB
First colours	Second colours

First international
- Cuba 1–1 Jamaica (Havana, Cuba; 27 September 1970)

Biggest win
- British Virgin Islands 0–29 Cuba (Kralendijk, Netherlands Antilles; 9 November 2010)

Biggest defeat
- Mexico 9–1 Cuba (Montego Bay, Jamaica; 10 January 2015)

FIFA U-20 World Cup
- Appearances: 2 (first in 2013)
- Best result: Group stage (2013, 2025)

The Cuba national under-20 football team is the under-20 football team of Cuba. The team made its debut at the 2013 FIFA U-20 World Cup in Turkey.

As of recently in the FIFA-Under 20 World Cup in Chile, Cuba became the First Caribbean country to obtain at least 1 point in an under-20 FIFA World Cup. This happened in October 1st 2025 with a 2-2 draw against Italy's Under-20 Team.

== Competitive Record ==
=== FIFA U-20 World Cup ===
Year	Round	Position	GP	W	D*	L	GS	GA
(Tunisia) 1977	Did not qualify							
(Japan) 1979	Did not qualify							
(Australia) 1981	Did not qualify							
(Mexico) 1983	Did not qualify							
(Soviet Union) 1985	Did not qualify							
(Chile) 1987	Did not qualify							
(Saudi Arabia) 1989	Did not qualify							
(Portugal) 1991	Did not qualify							
(Australia) 1993	Did not qualify							
(Qatar) 1995	Did not qualify							
(Malaysia) 1997	Did not qualify							
(Nigeria) 1999	Did not qualify							
(Argentina) 2001	Did not qualify							
(United Arab Emirates) 2003	Did not qualify							
(Netherlands) 2005	Did not qualify							
(Canada) 2007	Did not qualify							
(Egypt) 2009	Did not qualify							
(Colombia) 2011	Did not qualify							
(Turkey) 2013	Group stage	24th	3	0	0	3	1	10
(New Zealand) 2015	Did not qualify							
(South Korea) 2017	Did not qualify							
(Poland) 2019	Did not qualify							
(Argentina) 2023	Did not qualify							
(Chile) 2025	Group stage	23rd	3	0	1	2	4	8
(Azerbaijan) (Uzbekistan) 2027	Did not qualify							
(Armenia) (Georgia (country)) 2029	To be determined							
Total	2/26		6	0	1	5	5	18

== Current squad ==
- The following players were called up for the FIFA U-20 World Cup.
- Match dates: 27 September – 19 October 2025
- Caps and goals correct as of: 26 January 2026
- Names in italics denote players who have been capped for the senior team.

No.	Pos.	Player	Date of birth (age)	Caps	Goals	Club
1	GK	Yorlan Urgellés	23 February 2005 (age 21)	0	0	(Football Association of Cuba) Guantanamo
12	GK	Yurdy Hodelín	23 September 2005 (age 21)	3	0	(Costa Rican Football Federation) FC Moravia FCM
20	GK	Samuel Rodriguez	3 May 2003 (age 23)	3	0	(Royal Spanish Football Federation) Real Ávila CF
21	GK	Yurixander Zayas	3 May 2007 (age 19)	0	0	(Football Association of Cuba) Ciego de Ávila
2	DF	Elvis Casanova	17 September 2005 (age 21)	3	0	(Costa Rican Football Federation) FC Moravia FCM
3	DF	Ricardo Polo	14 May 2005 (age 21)	0	0	(Nicaraguan Football Federation) CS Sébaco
4	DF	Camilo Pinillo	25 February 2005 (age 21)	3	0	(Royal Belgian Football Association) Lierse U21
5	DF	Karel Pérez	25 August 2005 (age 21)	3	1	(Costa Rican Football Federation) AD Sarchí
8	DF	Leandro Mena	3 February 2005 (age 21)	3	0	(Costa Rican Football Federation) Escorpiones
16	DF	Norlys Chávez	14 April 2003 (age 23)	2	0	(Costa Rican Football Federation) AD Rosario
6	MF	Diego Catasus	4 March 2005 (age 21)	3	0	(Italian Football Federation) Latina U19
10	MF	Michael Camejo	17 March 2005 (age 21)	2	2	(Costa Rican Football Federation) Escorpiones
11	MF	Romario Torrez	9 February 2005 (age 21)	3	0	(Costa Rican Football Federation) ADR Jicaral
14	MF	Maikol Vega	12 September 2006 (age 20)	3	0	(Costa Rican Football Federation) Inter
15	MF	Marcos Campo	15 November 2005 (age 21)	3	0	(Nicaraguan Football Federation) CS Sébaco
7	FW	Jade Quiñones	23 September 2007 (age 19)	3	0	(Football Association of Cuba) La Habana
9	FW	Alessio Raballo	9 September 2006 (age 20)	3	1	(Italian Football Federation) Cremonese U20
13	FW	Didier Reinoso	31 March 2007 (age 19)	3	0	(Football Association of Cuba) La Habana
17	FW	Aniel Casanova	17 September 2005 (age 21)	1	0	(Football Association of Cuba) Villa Clara
18	FW	Yordan Castañer	23 February 2005 (age 21)	2	0	(Football Association of Cuba) La Habana
19	FW	Enmanuel Torres	10 February 2005 (age 21)	1	0	(Football Association of Cuba) Santiago de Cuba

== Head-to-head record ==
The following table shows Cuba's head-to-head record in the FIFA U-20 World Cup.

Opponent	Pld	W	D	L	GF	GA	GD	Win %
Argentina	1	0	0	1	1	3	−2	0.00
Australia	1	0	0	1	1	3	−2	0.00
Italy	1	0	1	0	2	2	+0	0.00
Nigeria	1	0	0	1	0	3	−3	0.00
Portugal	1	0	0	1	0	5	−5	0.00
South Korea	1	0	0	1	1	2	−1	0.00
Total	6	0	1	5	5	18	−13	0.00

== Honors ==
- Copa de Las Antillas U23: 1
  - 2004

== See also ==
- Cuba national football team
- Cuba national under-17 football team
