= FC Sancti Spíritus =

Association football club in Cuba

- Nickname: Los espirituanos (The Santcti Spiritus ones)
- Founded: 1985; 41 years ago
- Ground: Estadio Terreno la Formadora, Sancti Spíritus, Cuba
- Capacity: 2,843
- Manager: Yunielis Castillo
- League: Campeonato Nacional
- 2014: 6th
Home colours

FC Sancti Spíritus is a Cuban football club, based in the city of Sancti Spíritus, which currently plays in the Campeonato Nacional de Fútbol. Its home stadium is the 2,843-capacity Estadio Terreno la Formadora.

== Current squad ==
Note: Flags indicate national team as defined under FIFA eligibility rules; some limited exceptions apply. Players may hold more than one non-FIFA nationality.

No.	Pos.	Nation	Player
—	GK	CUB	Yiemi Montero
—	GK	CUB	Joaice Alvarez
—	DF	CUB	Yosbel Caballero
—	DF	CUB	Eugenio Palmero Diaz
—	DF	CUB	Lorenzo Bernal
—	DF	CUB	Yuniel Molina
—	DF	CUB	Yoandry Dortas
—	MF	CUB	Silvio Quinones
—	MF	CUB	Dasiel Sorì Rosales
—	MF	CUB	Eduard Puga

No.	Pos.	Nation	Player
—	MF	CUB	Duviel Morales
—	MF	CUB	Leobel Goya
—	MF	CUB	Yannier Valdivia
—	MF	CUB	Rafael Quintero
—	FW	CUB	Randy Rojas
—	FW	CUB	Ricardo Suarez Monzon
—	FW	CUB	Jorge Martinez Toca
—	FW	ANG	Ambrosio Domingos
—	FW	ANG	Joao Pinto Holorio
—	FW	CUB	Daniel Tellez
