= FC Ciego de Ávila =

Cuban football club

- Full name: Fútbol Club Ciego de Ávila
- Nickname: Los Tiburones (The Sharks)
- Founded: 1978; 48 years ago
- Ground: Complejo Deportivo Sergio Alonso Grandal; Morón, Cuba
- Capacity: 3,000
- Manager: José Yulier Herranz
- League: Campeonato Nacional de Fútbol de Cuba
- 2017: 3rd
Home colours

FC Ciego de Ávila is a Cuban football team playing in the Cuban National Football League and representing Ciego de Ávila Province. They play their home games at Sergio Alonso Grandal in Morón.

== History ==
Nicknamed Los Tiburones (the Sharks), the team won 5 league titles, the most recent one in 2014.

== Honours ==
- Campeonato Nacional de Fútbol de Cuba
  - Clausura Champions: 1993, 2001, 2003, 2010, 2014
  - Apertura Runners-up: 2019–20

== Current squad ==
2018 Season
Note: Flags indicate national team as defined under FIFA eligibility rules; some limited exceptions apply. Players may hold more than one non-FIFA nationality.

No.	Pos.	Nation	Player
—	GK	CUB	Edenis Fernández
—	GK	CUB	Antonio Jesús Sáenz
—	GK	CUB	Anoide Sardiñas
—	DF	CUB	Javier Aguilar
—	DF	CUB	Luis Feliz Borges
—	DF	CUB	Yasel Francis
—	DF	CUB	Orisvel Leyva
—	DF	CUB	Daniel Lima Garcia
—	DF	CUB	Yasmany López
—	DF	CUB	Orlando Madrigal
—	DF	CUB	Alexis Núñez
—	DF	CUB	Josè Paul Pino
—	MF	CUB	Aníbal Álvarez
—	MF	CUB	Alessandro Amador
—	MF	CUB	Yoan Carlos Casola
—	MF	CUB	Tomás Cruz
—	MF	CUB	Ernesto Duanes Mora

No.	Pos.	Nation	Player
—	MF	CUB	Lían Carlos Fajardo
—	MF	CUB	Roberto Fernández
—	MF	CUB	Sánder Fernández
—	MF	CUB	Angel Gongora
—	MF	CUB	Yarioski López
—	MF	CUB	Yoannys Morales
—	MF	CUB	Julio Noy
—	MF	CUB	Osmel Nuñez
—	MF	CUB	Yaico Picallo
—	MF	CUB	Gerardo Rodríguez
—	MF	CUB	Jesùs Rodríguez
—	MF	CUB	Yuniex Romero
—	FW	CUB	Yadiel Montedeoca
—	FW	CUB	Juan Murillo
—	FW	CUB	Allan Alvaro Pérez
—		CUB	Ángel Rodríguez
