= FC Matanzas =

Cuban football club

- Full name: Fútbol Club Matanzas
- Nickname: Los Cocodrilos (The Crocodiles)
- Ground: Estadio Calimete, Calimete, Matanzas Province, Cuba
- Capacity: 1,000
- League: Liga Nacional de Fútbol
- 2025: Group B: 3rd Overall: 11th Clausura: Did not qualify
Home colours	Away colours

FC Matanzas is a Cuban professional football club based in Matanzas. Its home stadium is the 1,000-capacity Estadio Calimete. It currently plays in the Campeonato Nacional.

== Current squad ==
Note: Flags indicate national team as defined under FIFA eligibility rules; some limited exceptions apply. Players may hold more than one non-FIFA nationality.

No.	Pos.	Nation	Player
—	GK	CUB	Brian Valdes Gil
—	GK	CUB	Julio Aldama
—	DF	CUB	Dayan Torriente
—	DF	CUB	Fernando Corrales
—	DF	CUB	Jorge Luis Carrion
—	DF	CUB	Wilber Contreras
—	DF	CUB	Yoslandy San Martìn
—	MF	CUB	Yoiniel Riscabal
—	MF	CUB	Livan Vasconcelos

No.	Pos.	Nation	Player
—	MF	CUB	Bryan Rosales Sarracent
—	MF	CUB	Eduanis Pulgaron
—	MF	CUB	Liusban Polledo
—	MF	CUB	Yohan De La Torre
—	MF	CUB	Carlos Muilian
—	FW	CUB	Angel Luis Flores
—	FW	CUB	Eduardo Morales
—	FW	CUB	Yordanis Tielves
—	FW	CUB	Yon Pite
