= FC Pinar del Río =

Cuban football club

- Full name: FC Pinar del Río
- Nicknames: Los verdes (The Greens); Los pinareños (The Pinar del Rio ones)
- Founded: 1978
- Ground: Estadio La Bombonera, San Cristóbal, Cuba
- Capacity: 5,000
- Manager: Carlos "Chorro" Torres
Home colours	Away colours

FC Pinar del Río is a Cuban professional football team playing in the Cuban National Football League and representing Pinar del Río Province. They play their home games at the Estadio La Bombonera in Pinar del Río.

== History ==
The team won 7 league titles, and was relegated from the Campeonato Nacional in 2014.

== Honours ==
- Campeonato Nacional de Fútbol de Cuba
  - Clausura Champions: 1987, 1989, 1990, 1992, 1995, 2000, 2006
  - Apertura Champions: 2019–20
- CONCACAF Champions' Cup
  - Runners-up: 1989, 1990
- CFU Club Championship
  - best performance: 2007, 3rd Group A – First Phase

== Performance in CONCACAF competitions ==
Competition	Round	Country	Club	Home	Away	Aggregate
1989 Champions' Cup	Caribbean Group B	ANT	SV Juventus	6–0	—	—
1989 Champions' Cup	Caribbean Group B	TRI	Defence Force	1–0	—	—
1989 Champions' Cup	Caribbean Group B	TRI	Trintoc	3–3	—	—
1989 Champions' Cup	Caribbean Group B	ANT	Jong Colombia	4–3	—	—
1989 Champions' Cup	Caribbean Final	MTQ	RC Rivière-Pilote	1–1	2–1	3–2
1989 Champions' Cup	CONCACAF Final	MEX	Pumas UNAM	1–1	1–3	2–4
1990 Champions' Cup	Caribbean First round	CUB	Deportivo Central	3–1	1–0	4–1
1990 Champions' Cup	Caribbean Second round	HAI	FICA	1–1	3–0	4–1
1990 Champions' Cup	CONCACAF Semi-final	—	bye	—	—	—
1990 Champions' Cup	CONCACAF Final	MEX	Club América	2–2	0–6	2–6

== Current squad ==
2018 Season
Note: Flags indicate national team as defined under FIFA eligibility rules; some limited exceptions apply. Players may hold more than one non-FIFA nationality.

No.	Pos.	Nation	Player
—	GK	CUB	Angel Izquierdo
—	GK	CUB	Frank Ordaz
—	GK	CUB	Elier Pozo
—	DF	CUB	Jose Antonio Almelo
—	DF	CUB	Yordanis Cruz
—	DF	CUB	Rigoberto Garcia Martínez
—	DF	CUB	Carlos Adrian Gómez
—	DF	CUB	Leodanis Hondarez
—	DF	CUB	Yulio Lopez Tellez
—	DF	CUB	Adrian Martínez Chirino
—	DF	CUB	Modesto Méndez
—	DF	CUB	Rodney Oviedo
—	DF	CUB	Reinier Pintado
—	DF	CUB	Juan Puentes Gomez
—	DF	CUB	Yosnier Riscabal
—	DF	CUB	Lázaro Royero
—	DF	CUB	Dennis Soto

No.	Pos.	Nation	Player
—	DF	CUB	Josbiel Vázquez
—	DF	CUB	Jose Carlos Vélez
—	MF	CUB	Yadier Acosta
—	MF	CUB	Lázaro Castro
—	MF	CUB	Alejandro Giralt
—	MF	CUB	Pedro Antonio Gonzales
—	MF	CUB	Reinaldo Pérez
—	MF	CUB	Lázaro Rivera
—	MF	CUB	Yampier Rodríguez
—	MF	CUB	Frank Ernesto Valdes
—	MF	CUB	Lázaro Vicet
—	FW	CUB	José Ciprian Alfonso
—	FW	CUB	Alberto David Alonso
—	FW	CUB	Maikel Reyes
—	FW	CUB	Jean Carlos Rodríguez
—	FW	CUB	Yasmani Soriano
—	FW	CUB	Luis Paradela
