= FC Cienfuegos =

Association football club in Cuba

- Full name: Fútbol Club Cienfuegos
- Nickname: Los Marineros (The Sailor men)
- Founded: 1978; 48 years ago
- Ground: Estadio Luis Pérez Lozano; Cienfuegos, Cuba
- Capacity: 4,000
- Manager: Frank Pérez Espinosa
- League: Campeonato Nacional de Fútbol
- 2023: Champions
Home colours	Away colours

FC Cienfuegos is a Cuban professional football team playing in the Cuban National Football League and representing Cienfuegos Province. They play their home games at the Estadio Luis Pérez Lozano in Cienfuegos.

== History ==
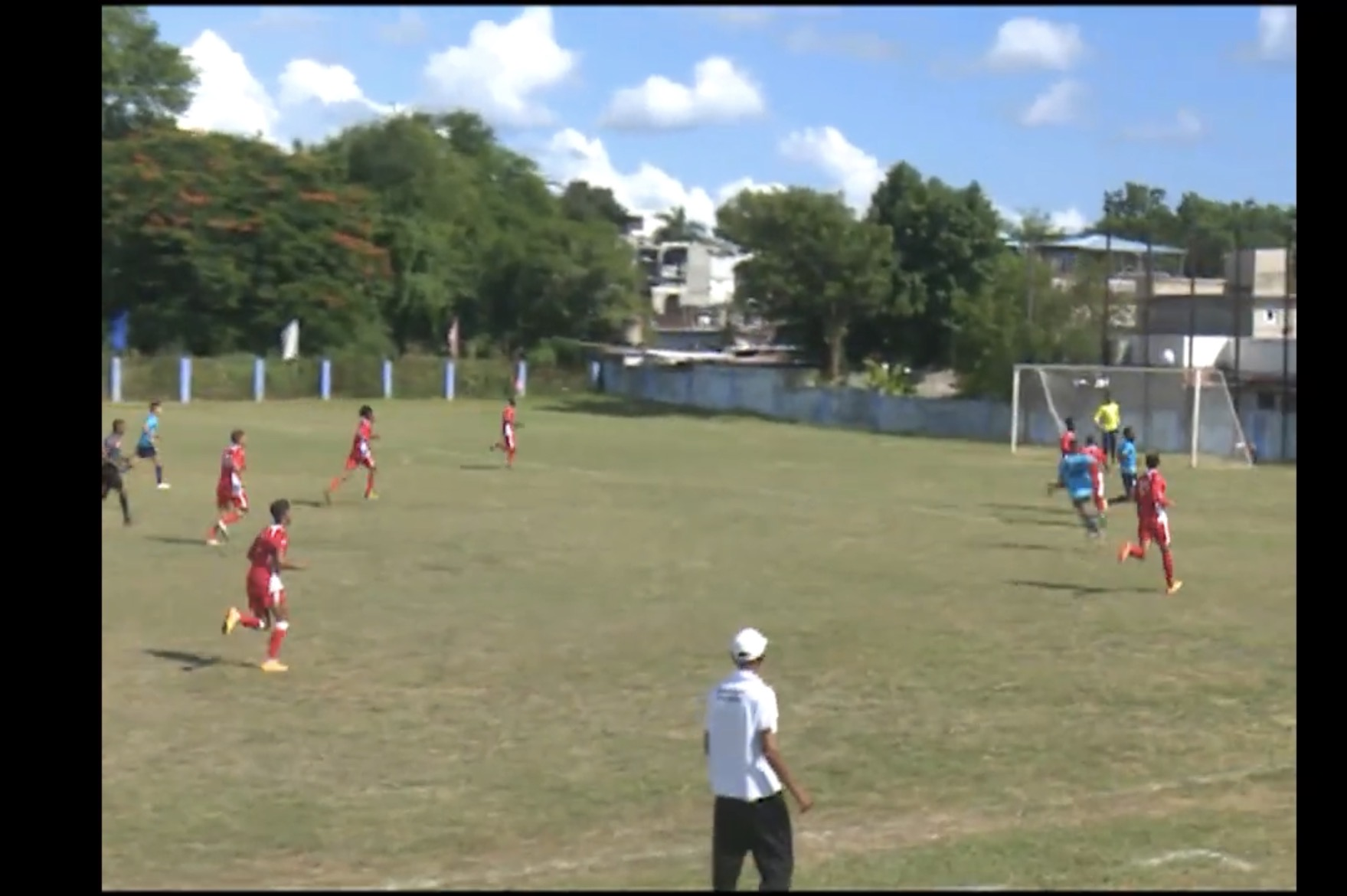
Cienfuegos playing against FC Santiago de Cuba in the 2023 SuperCopa (Clausura winner vs Apertura winner) at Luis Pérez Lozano Stadium

Nicknamed Los Marineros (the Sailormen), the team won 5 league titles, the most recent one in 2023.

== Honors ==
National Titles
Competitions	Wins	Seasons
Campeonato Nacional de Fútbol de Cuba	5	1985, 1990, 2008, 2009, 2023

== Current squad ==
2018 Season
Note: Flags indicate national team as defined under FIFA eligibility rules; some limited exceptions apply. Players may hold more than one non-FIFA nationality.

No.	Pos.	Nation	Player
—	GK	CUB	Adrián Betancourt
—	GK	CUB	Wilmer Bourkes
—	DF	CUB	Dayan Hernández
—	DF	CUB	Jansiel Blanco
—	DF	CUB	Serguei Campillo
—	DF	CUB	Orlando Delgado
—	DF	CUB	Leonardo Antonio López
—	DF	CUB	Carlos E. Pérez
—	DF	CUB	Jonathan Ramirez
—	DF	CUB	Yosdeibi Romero
—	MF	CUB	Antonio Guerra
—	MF	CUB	Chistopher Llorente
—	MF	CUB	Alberto Molina
—	MF	CUB	Deyniel Pérez
—	MF	CUB	José William Pérez
—	MF	CUB	Alejandro Portal

No.	Pos.	Nation	Player
—	MF	CUB	Neiser Sandó
—	MF	CUB	Yosuan Solís
—	MF	CUB	Isel Valero
—	FW	CUB	Asnel Armenteros
—	FW	CUB	Yoelvis Armenteros
—	FW	CUB	Reinier Cerdeira
—	FW	CUB	Rey Herrera
—	FW	CUB	Yadiel Reinaldo
—	FW	CUB	Deyvi Santa Cruz
—	FW	CUB	Alain Solís
—		CUB	Osniel Cabrera
—		CUB	Duniel Calderón
—		CUB	Reydi García
—		CUB	Damián Ocampo
—		CUB	José Dayan Pérez
—		CUB	Yordan Santa Cruz
