= FC Villa Clara =

Association football club in Cuba

- Full name: Fútbol Club Villa Clara
- Nickname: El Expreso del Centro (The Center Express)
- Founded: 1978; 48 years ago
- Ground: Estadio Camilo Cienfuegos; Zulueta (Villa Clara Province, Cuba)
- Capacity: 5,000
- Manager: Raúl Mederos Sosa
- League: Campeonato Nacional
- 2025: 2nd (Group B, Apertura) 4th (Clausura overall) 4th (Clausura playoffs)
Home colours	Away colours

Fútbol Club Villa Clara is a Cuban professional football club based in Santa Clara, Villa Clara Province. The club currently competes in the Campeonato Nacional de Fútbol, the top division of Cuban football.

== Overview ==
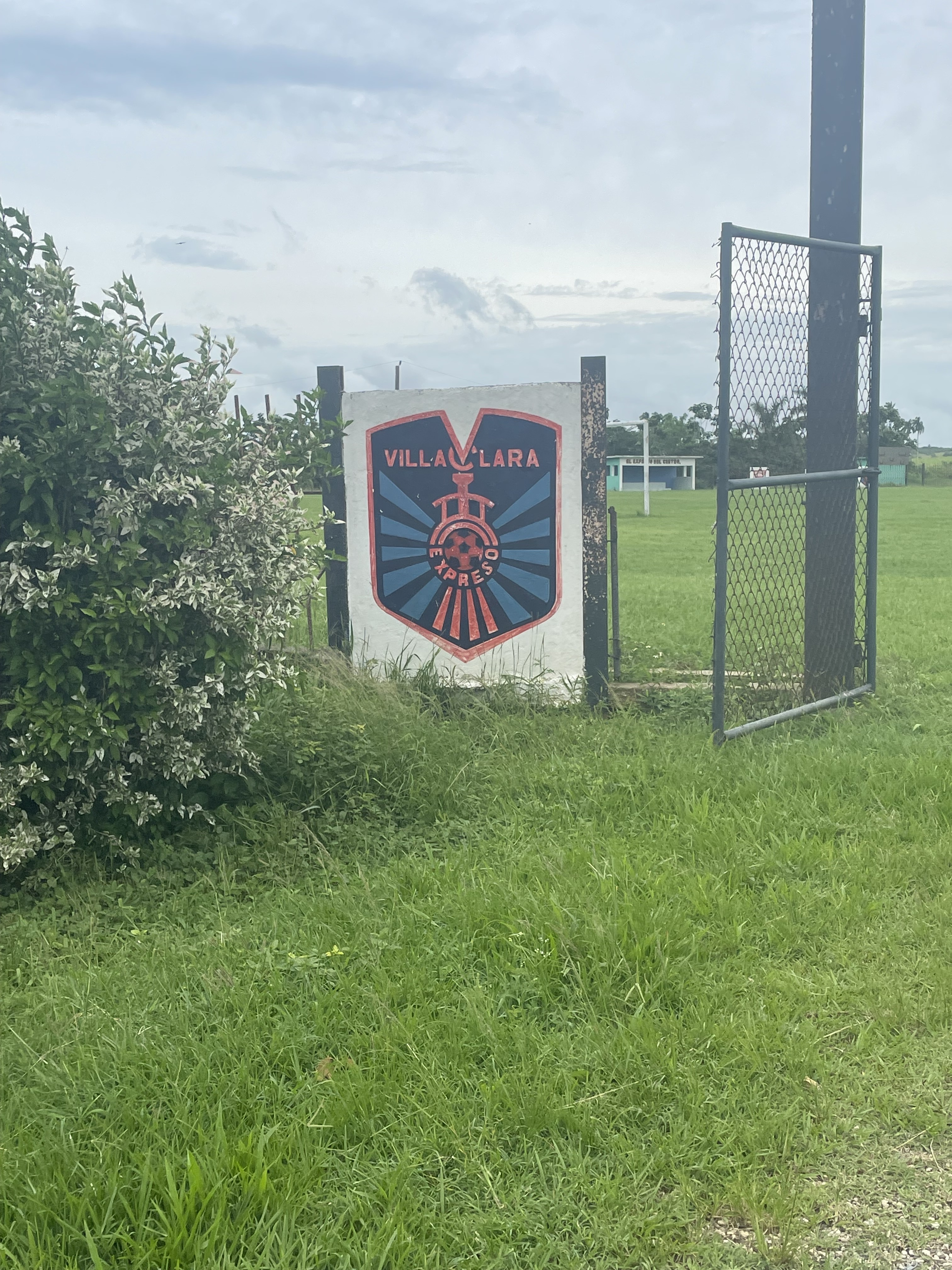
Villa Clara logo at the Camilo Cienfuegos Stadium

The club, mostly playing in Santa Clara at Estadio Augusto César Sandino, and representing the city and the whole province, is legally based in the village of Zulueta and plays some matches at the Camilo Cienfuegos Stadium. Next to the Camilo Cienfuegos stadium is a smaller football field for the public. They have also played matches at the EIDE Hector Ruiz Perez (School for Sports Initiation).

== International matches ==
Competition	Round	Country	Team	Score	Home/Away
2003 U23 Copa de Las Antillas	Match 1	CUB	Cuba U-20	2–0	Home
2003 U23 Copa de Las Antillas	Match 2	DOM	Dominican Republic U-23	2–0	Home
2003 U23 Copa de Las Antillas	Match 3	CUB	Cuba U-23	2–2	Home
2003 U23 Copa de Las Antillas	Match 4	HAI	Haiti U-23	1–0	Home

== Achievements ==
=== League ===
- Campeonato Nacional de Fútbol de Cuba: 14
  - 1980, 1981, 1982, 1983, 1986, 1992, 1996, 1997, 2002–03, 2004–05, 2010–11, 2011–12, 2013, 2016

=== International ===
- Copa de Las Antillas U23: 1
  - 2003

== Current squad ==
Squad of Villa Clara in the 2023 season

Note: Flags indicate national team as defined under FIFA eligibility rules; some limited exceptions apply. Players may hold more than one non-FIFA nationality.

No.	Pos.	Nation	Player
3	DF	CUB	Gilbert Iglesias
9	MF	CUB	Junior Betancourt
12	GK	CUB	Ray Machado
16	DF	CUB	Enmanuel López
18	MF	CUB	Lázaro Tuero
19	MF	CUB	Yordan Pérez
20	FW	CUB	Yosvani García
—	GK	CUB	Ronaldo Ferrer
—	GK	CUB	César Alejandro Manzano
—	DF	CUB	Norgeman Rodríguez
—	DF	CUB	Brayan Aquinet
—	DF	CUB	Dariel Carta
—	DF	CUB	Denis A. Díaz
—	DF	CUB	Jairo Javier Moreno
—	DF	CUB	Karel Alexander Castro
—	DF	CUB	Mario E. Cuellar

No.	Pos.	Nation	Player
—	DF	CUB	Yeremi Molina
—	MF	CUB	Jeffry Miguel Maya
—	MF	CUB	Anderson Toledo
—	MF	CUB	Brayan Vega
—	MF	CUB	Héctor Aquila
—	MF	CUB	Jaime Lázaro Domenech
—	MF	CUB	Jan Carlos Fernández
—	MF	CUB	José Felipe Denis
—	MF	CUB	Lenier Menas
—	MF	CUB	Miguel Colón
—	MF	CUB	Rogney Hurtado
—	MF	CUB	Yhonmy Lomothe
—	FW	CUB	Lázaro J. Alfonso
—	FW	CUB	Lázaro Yudelvis Sáez
—	FW	CUB	Sándor Pérez
—	FW	CUB	Sandor Sandoval

=== Coaches ===
In the 2023 season

Name	Nationality
Pedro Pereira	Cuba
Farael Aquinet (assistant)	Cuba
Serguei Prado (assistant)	Cuba
Juan Carlos Fernández (goalkeeper)	Cuba
Raúl Mederos (fitness)	Cuba
