= FC Camagüey =

Cuban football club

- Full name: Club de Fútbol Camagüey
- Nickname: Los Miuras (The Miuras)
- Founded: 1912
- Ground: Campo de Fútbol Sebastopoll; Minas, Cuba
- Capacity: 1,000
- Manager: Julio Valero Martínez
- League: Campeonato Nacional de Fútbol
- 2017: 2nd
Home colours

Club de Fútbol Camagüey is a Cuban football team playing in the Cuban National Football League and representing Camagüey Province. They have been staging their home games at Terreno Sebastopol in Minas, after leaving the Estadio Patricio Lumumba in Camagüey.

== History ==
The team won 5 league titles between 1968 and 1977 when it was named Granjeros.

Since the 1970s, the FC Camagüey has occupied first places in Cuban football. In 2015, the team won the first place in the Cuban national championship.

== Honors ==
- Campeonato Nacional de Fútbol de Cuba
  - Champions (6): 1968, 1969, 1970, 1975, 1977 (all as Granjeros), 2015

== Current squad ==
2018 Season
Note: Flags indicate national team as defined under FIFA eligibility rules; some limited exceptions apply. Players may hold more than one non-FIFA nationality.

No.	Pos.	Nation	Player
—	GK	CUB	Yordanis Barreto
—	GK	CUB	Danilo Caro
—	GK	CUB	Dainer Díaz Oliva
—	GK	CUB	Diosveli Guerra
—	DF	CUB	Roberto Delgado
—	DF	CUB	Lázaro Hernández
—	DF	CUB	Angel Huerta
—	DF	CUB	Andy Huerta
—	DF	CUB	Manuel Mateos
—	DF	CUB	Yaisnier Nápoles
—	DF	CUB	Miguel Portillo
—	DF	CUB	Raciel Silva
—	MF	CUB	Hassier Albanes

No.	Pos.	Nation	Player
—	MF	CUB	Aarón Arango
—	MF	CUB	Raidel Fernández
—	MF	CUB	Elián Jiménez
—	MF	CUB	Raudel Márquez
—	MF	CUB	Armando Marthy
—	MF	CUB	Luismel Morris
—	MF	CUB	Omar Romero
—	MF	CUB	Yaidel Romero
—	FW	CUB	Victor Colma
—	FW	CUB	Armando Coroneaux
—	FW	CUB	Duxney Espinosa
—	FW	CUB	Iván Pérez
—	FW	CUB	Dagoberto Quesada
