= FC La Habana =

Cuban football club

La Habana
- Full name: Football Club La Habana
- Nickname: Los Capitalinos (The Capital Ones)
- Founded: 1915; 111 years ago
- Ground: Estadio La Polar; Havana, Cuba
- Capacity: 2,000
- Manager: Jesus Tosca
- League: Campeonato Nacional de Fútbol
- 2025: 1st, champions
Home colours	Away colours

FC La Habana is a Cuban professional football club playing in the Cuban National Football League and representing La Habana Province. They play their home games at the Estadio La Polar in Havana.

== Kit manufacturers and shirt sponsors ==
Name	Period
(Italy) Legea	2019
(Spain) Joma	2020–2025
(Guadeloupe) Ballers Pride	2026–present

== Current squad ==
Squad during the 2025 Liga Nacional de Cuba Clausura final, with players transferred out removed from the list

Note: Flags indicate national team as defined under FIFA eligibility rules; some limited exceptions apply. Players may hold more than one non-FIFA nationality.

No.	Pos.	Nation	Player
1	GK	CUB	Carlos Palomino
2	DF	CUB	Henry Aguilera
4	MF	CUB	Arnaldy Ramírez
5	DF	CUB	Ronald Aranda
7	MF	CUB	José Luis Rodríguez
9	FW	CUB	Daniel Marín
10	FW	CUB	Cristian Rodriguez
11	FW	CUB	Yoandir Puga
12	GK	CUB	Pablo Ignacio
14	MF	CUB	Dairon D. Reyes
15	DF	CUB	O'Farril
16	FW	CUB	Alexander Grave de Peralta
18	FW	CUB	Yankarlos Iglesias
20	MF	CUB	Alex Luis Sarmiento
21	DF	CUB	Hayr Zayas

No.	Pos.	Nation	Player
25	MF	CUB	Enzo Viamontes
27	FW	CUB	Brian Romero

== Achievements ==
- Campeonato Nacional de Fútbol de Cuba: 5

1916, 1965, 1966, 1967, 2025
