= 2012 Caribbean Cup squads =

Football tournament squads

The 2012 Caribbean Cup is an international football tournament that was held in Antigua and Barbuda from 7–16 December.

== Group A ==
=== Antigua and Barbuda ===
Head coach: (Antigua and Barbuda) Rolston Williams

No.	Pos.	Player	Date of birth (age)	Caps	Goals	Club
18	GK	Molvin James	4 May 1989 (age 37)	21	0	(Antigua and Barbuda Football Association) Antigua Barracuda FC
21	GK	Keita de Castro	23 May 1981 (age 45)	13	0	(Antigua and Barbuda Football Association) Antigua Barracuda FC
1	GK	Brentton Muhammad	11 September 1990 (age 36)	0	0	(United States Soccer Federation) Florida Institute of Technology
17	DF	George Dublin (Captain)	11 February 1977 (age 49)	59	4	(Antigua and Barbuda Football Association) Antigua Barracuda FC
4	DF	Karanja Mack	24 August 1987 (age 39)	28	0	(Antigua and Barbuda Football Association) Antigua Barracuda FC
20	DF	Akeem Thomas	5 January 1990 (age 36)	24	1	(Antigua and Barbuda Football Association) Antigua Barracuda FC
5	DF	Marvin McCoy	2 October 1988 (age 38)	6	0	(The Football Association) Wycombe Wanderers
19	DF	Luke Blakely	13 July 1988 (age 38)	6	0	(Antigua and Barbuda Football Association) Antigua Barracuda FC
3	DF	Zaine Francis-Angol	30 June 1993 (age 33)	4	0	(Scottish Football Association) Motherwell
22	DF	Hazeley Pyle	7 October 1993 (age 33)	1	0	(Antigua and Barbuda Football Association) Antigua Barracuda FC
6	MF	Mikele Leigertwood	12 November 1982 (age 43)	11	1	(The Football Association) Reading
14	MF	Randolph Burton	14 January 1987 (age 39)	37	12	(Antigua and Barbuda Football Association) Antigua Barracuda FC
13	MF	Tamarley Thomas	28 July 1983 (age 43)	32	8	(Antigua and Barbuda Football Association) Antigua Barracuda FC
11	MF	Quinton Griffith	27 February 1992 (age 34)	26	2	(Antigua and Barbuda Football Association) Antigua Barracuda FC
15	MF	Lawson Robinson	19 October 1986 (age 39)	19	1	(Antigua and Barbuda Football Association) Antigua Barracuda FC
10	MF	Keiran Murtagh	29 October 1988 (age 37)	10	1	(The Football Association) Macclesfield
7	MF	Kimoi Alexander	November 13, 1985 (age 40)	9	1	(Antigua and Barbuda Football Association) Antigua Barracuda FC
16	FW	Peter Byers	20 October 1984 (age 41)	48	33	(Antigua and Barbuda Football Association) Antigua Barracuda FC
9	FW	Stefan Smith	11 August 1989 (age 37)	11	0	(Antigua and Barbuda Football Association) Antigua Barracuda FC
23	FW	Dexter Blackstock	May 20, 1986 (age 40)	4	1	(The Football Association) Nottingham Forrest
12	FW	Moses Ashikodi	27 June 1987 (age 39)	2	0	(The Football Association) Ebbsfleet United
8	FW	Elvis Thomas	2 June 1994 (age 32)	3	0	(Antigua and Barbuda Football Association) Antigua Barracuda FC

=== Dominican Republic ===
Head coach: (Cuba) Clemente Hernández

No.	Pos.	Player	Date of birth (age)	Caps	Club
	GK	Miguel Lloyd	23 October 1983 (aged 29)	16	(Panama) Árabe Unido
	GK	Wellington Agramonte	12 February 1989 (aged 23)	11	(Dominican Republic) Deportivo Pantoja
	DF	Eduardo Acevedo Cruz	10 December 1985 (aged 26)	3	(Bosnia and Herzegovina) Rudar Prijedor
	DF	César García	13 March 1993 (aged 19)	18	Puerto Rico Islanders
	DF	Hansley Martinez	3 March 1991 (aged 21)	8	(Dominican Republic) San Cristóbal
	DF	César Ledesma	4 June 1990 (aged 22)	7	(Switzerland) Biel-Bienne
	DF	Carlos Martinez	4 February 1994 (aged 18)	0	(Spain) Barcelona
	DF	Solángel Miliano	9 February 1989 (aged 23)	11	(Dominican Republic) Deportivo Pantoja
	MF	Heinz Barmettler	21 June 1987 (aged 25)	7	(Liechtenstein) Vaduz
	MF	Rafael Flores	24 April 1991 (aged 21)	12	(Haiti) Tempête
	MF	Kerbi Rodriguez	1 June 1989 (aged 23)	17	(Dominican Republic) Barcelona Atlético
	MF	Jimmy Reyes	17 January 1989 (aged 23)	9	(Dominican Republic) Deportivo Pantoja
	MF	Manuel Perez	22 January 1980 (aged 32)	12	(Dominican Republic) Bauger
	MF	Pedro Antonio Núñez	5 September 1989 (aged 23)	5	(Dominican Republic) Deportivo Pantoja
	MF	Johan Cruz	8 October 1987 (aged 25)	16	(Dominican Republic) Deportivo Pantoja
	MF	Jose Ruiz	18 August 1990 (aged 22)	1	(Dominican Republic) San Cristóbal
	MF	Inoel Navarro	28 July 1987 (aged 25)	12	(Dominican Republic) Bauger
	FW	Jonathan Faña Frias	11 April 1987 (aged 25)	19	(Dominican Republic) Bauger
	FW	Javier Santana	16 October 1988 (aged 24)	0	(Switzerland) FC Tuggen
	FW	Domingo Peralta	28 July 1986 (aged 26)	13	(Dominican Republic) Moca
	FW	Erick Ozuna	5 October 1990 (aged 22)	16	(Haiti) Tempête

=== Martinique ===
Head coach: (Martinique) Patrick Cavelan

No.	Pos.	Player	Date of birth (age)	Caps	Club
	GK	Kévin Olimpa	10 March 1988 (aged 24)	0	(France) Girondins de Bordeaux
	GK	Emmanuel Vermignon	20 January 1989 (aged 23)	11	(Martinique) Club Colonial
	GK	Loïc Chauvet	30 April 1988 (aged 24)	1	(Martinique) Golden Star
	DF	Jordy Delem	18 March 1993 (aged 19)	11	(Martinique) Club Franciscain
	DF	Stanley Anglio	3 September 1982 (aged 30)	6	(Martinique) RC Rivière-Pilote
	DF	William Séry	20 March 1986 (aged 26)	3	(France) Raon-l'Étape
	DF	Sébastien Crétinoir	12 February 1986 (aged 26)	20	(Martinique) Club Colonial
	DF	Jacky Berdix	29 August 1979 (aged 33)	11	(Martinique) Case-Pilote
	DF	Romain Bannais	18 October 1985 (aged 27)	6	(Martinique) Club Franciscain
	DF	Nicolas Zaïre	27 June 1985 (aged 27)	14	(Martinique) RC Rivière-Pilote
	DF	Gaël Germany	10 May 1983 (aged 29)	16	(France) Arles-Avignon
	MF	Fabrice Reuperné	18 September 1975 (aged 37)	23	(Martinique) Golden Star
	MF	Stéphane Abaul	23 November 1991 (aged 21)	16	(Martinique) Club Franciscain
	MF	Daniel Hérelle	17 October 1988 (aged 24)	29	(Martinique) Club Colonial
	MF	Nicolas Mirza	18 November 1984 (aged 28)	0	(France) Quevilly
	MF	Lionel Ravi	18 November 1985 (aged 27)	6	(Martinique) Club Franciscain
	FW	Kévin Parsemain	13 February 1988 (aged 24)	26	(Martinique) RC Rivière-Pilote
	FW	Steeve Gustan	26 January 1985 (aged 27)	37	(Martinique) Club Franciscain
	FW	Djénhael Maingé	18 February 1992 (aged 20)	8	(Martinique) Club Franciscain
	FW	Anthony Angély	21 March 1990 (aged 22)	6	(Martinique) Essor-Préchotain
	FW	Josué Joseph-Rose	25 February 1986 (aged 26)	2	(Martinique) Essor-Préchotain
	FW	Frédéric Piquionne	8 December 1978 (aged 33)	1	(England) West Ham United
	FW	Steven Lécéfel	16 April 1986 (aged 26)	0	(Wales) Rhyl

=== Trinidad and Tobago ===
Head coach: (Trinidad and Tobago) Hutson Charles

No.	Pos.	Player	Date of birth (age)	Caps	Goals	Club
1	GK	Jan-Michael Williams	26 October 1984 (age 41)	43	0	(Trinidad and Tobago Football Association) W Connection
21	GK	Marvin Phillip	1 August 1984 (age 42)	39	0	(Trinidad and Tobago Football Association) Central FC
2	DF	Aubrey David	11 October 1990 (age 36)	3	1	(Trinidad and Tobago Football Association) Caledonia AIA
4	DF	Curtis Gonzales	26 January 1989 (age 37)	5	0	(Trinidad and Tobago Football Association) Defence Force
5	DF	Carlyle Mitchell	8 August 1987 (age 39)	10	0	(Canadian Soccer Association) Vancouver Whitecaps FC
6	DF	Kareem Moses	11 February 1990 (age 36)	4	0	(Trinidad and Tobago Football Association) North East Stars
17	DF	Daneil Cyrus	15 December 1990 (age 35)	18	0	(Trinidad and Tobago Football Association) W Connection
20	DF	Seon Power	2 February 1984 (age 42)	35	2	(Trinidad and Tobago Football Association) North East Stars
3	MF	Joevin Jones	3 August 1991 (age 35)	19	0	(Trinidad and Tobago Football Association) W Connection
7	MF	Hughtun Hector	16 October 1984 (age 42)	25	7	(Vietnam Football Federation) Sông Lam Nghệ An
8	MF	Ataullah Guerra	14 October 1987 (age 39)	14	2	(Trinidad and Tobago Football Association) Caledonia AIA
10	MF	Kevin Molino	17 June 1990 (age 36)	10	2	(United States Soccer Federation) Orlando City
11	MF	Kevon Carter	14 October 1983 (age 43)	19	4	(Trinidad and Tobago Football Association) Defence Force
12	MF	Lester Peltier	13 September 1988 (age 38)	16	5	(Slovak Football Association) Slovan Bratislava
16	MF	Keyon Edwards	29 December 1983 (age 42)	3	0	(Trinidad and Tobago Football Association) Caledonia AIA
18	MF	Densill Theobald	27 June 1982 (age 44)	83	2	(Trinidad and Tobago Football Association) Caledonia AIA
9	FW	Devorn Jorsling	27 December 1983 (age 42)	32	17	(Trinidad and Tobago Football Association) Defence Force
13	FW	Richard Roy	10 October 1987 (age 39)	7	1	(Trinidad and Tobago Football Association) Defence Force
14	FW	Willis Plaza	3 August 1987 (age 39)	5	4	(Vietnam Football Federation) Sông Lam Nghệ An
15	FW	Jamal Gay	9 February 1989 (age 37)	13	8	(Trinidad and Tobago Football Association) Caledonia AIA

== Group B ==
=== Cuba ===
Head coach: (Cuba) Chandler González

No.	Pos.	Player	Date of birth (age)	Caps	Club
1	GK	Odelin Molina	4 August 1974 (aged 38)	103	(Cuba) FC Villa Clara
2	DF	Jorge Luis Clavelo	8 August 1982 (aged 30)	29	(Cuba) FC Villa Clara
3	DF	Carlos Francisco	22 May 1990 (aged 22)	30	Santiago de Cuba
4	FW	Jorge Luis Corrales	20 May 1991 (aged 21)	12	(Cuba) FC Pinar del Río
5	MF	Marcel Hernandez	11 June 1989 (aged 23)	17	(Cuba) Ciudad de La Habana
6	MF	Jaime Colomé	30 June 1979 (aged 33)	60	(Cuba) Ciudad de La Habana
7	MF	Aliannis Urgellés	25 June 1985 (aged 27)	25	(Cuba) FC Guantánamo
8	MF	Alberto Gómez	12 February 1988 (aged 24)	15	(Cuba) FC Guantánamo
9	DF	Renay Malblanche	8 August 1991 (aged 21)	5	(Cuba) FC Holguín
10	FW	Ariel Martínez	9 May 1986 (aged 26)	19	(Cuba) Sancti Spíritus
11	FW	Yaudel Lahera	9 February 1991 (aged 21)	8	(Cuba) Ciudad de La Habana
15	FW	Alexei Zuaznábar	25 April 1985 (aged 27)	3	(Cuba) Cienfuegos
13	FW	Adonis Ramos	28 June 1985 (aged 27)	22	(Cuba) Granma
14	DF	Adrián Diz	4 March 1994 (aged 18)	1	(Cuba) Ciudad de La Habana
12	DF	José Macías	10 May 1991 (aged 21)	6	(Cuba) Ciudad de La Habana
16	GK	Julio Pichardo	10 January 1990 (aged 22)	2	(Cuba) Las Tunas
17	DF	Roberto Linares	10 February 1986 (aged 26)	27	(Cuba) Villa Clara
18	DF	Yoel Colomé	15 October 1982 (aged 30)	28	(Cuba) Ciudad de La Habana

=== French Guiana ===
Head coach: (French Guiana) François Louis-Marie

No.	Pos.	Player	Date of birth (age)	Caps	Club
	GK	Laurent Petchy	16 June 1983 (aged 29)	2	(France) ES Viry-Châtillon
	DF	Albert Ajaiso	14 November 1986 (aged 26)	8	(France) FC Quimperlé
	DF	Samuel Sophie	23 May 1986 (aged 26)	11	(French Guiana) US Sinnamary
	DF	Gary Marigard	6 January 1988 (aged 24)	5	(France) ES Wasquehal
	DF	Marvin Torvic	5 January 1988 (aged 24)	6	(French Guiana) US Sinnamary
	DF	Marc Edwige	26 September 1986 (aged 26)	2	(French Guiana) CSC Cayenne
	DF	Fréderic Adinge	4 January 1984 (aged 28)	4	(French Guiana) Cosma Foot Saint-Laurent-du-Maroni
	MF	Rhudy Evens	13 February 1988 (aged 24)	17	(French Guiana) AJ Saint-Georges
	MF	Serge Lespérance	9 March 1982 (aged 30)	21	(French Guiana) US Matoury
	MF	Lesly Malouda	16 November 1983 (aged 29)	3	(France) Dijon FC
	MF	Raymond Jean-Jacques	15 February 1987 (aged 25)	7	(French Guiana) CSC Cayenne
	FW	Gary Pigrée	22 May 1988 (aged 24)	11	(French Guiana) AJ Saint-Georges
	FW	Jean-Claude Darcheville	25 July 1975 (aged 37)	5	(French Guiana) US Sinnamary
	FW	Marc-Frédéric Habran	25 December 1988 (aged 23)	6	(French Guiana) AJ Saint-Georges
	FW	Stanley Ridel	8 August 1993 (aged 19)	3	(French Guiana) CSC Cayenne

=== Haiti ===
Head coach: (Cuba) Israel Blake Cantero

No.	Pos.	Player	Date of birth (age)	Caps	Club
1	GK	Frandy Montrévil	14 January 1982 (aged 30)	3	(Haiti) Valencia de Leogane
2	DF	Jean Sony	23 January 1986 (aged 26)	33	(Romania) Petrolul Ploiești
3	DF	Mechack Jérôme	21 April 1990 (aged 22)	19	(United States) Orlando City
4	DF	Olrish Saurel	13 September 1985 (aged 27)	12	(Haiti) Don Bosco
6	MF	Vaniel Sirin	26 October 1989 (aged 23)	13	(Haiti) Tempête
7	FW	Brunel Fucien	26 August 1984 (aged 28)	37	(Martinique) Aiglon du Lamentin
8	DF	Judelin Aveska	21 October 1987 (aged 25)	23	(Argentina) Independiente Rivadavia
9	FW	Leonel Saint-Preux	12 May 1985 (aged 27)	34	(Haiti) Victory
10	FW	Peguero Jean Philippe	29 September 1981 (aged 31)	17	(Haiti) Don Bosco
12	DF	Frantz Bertin	30 May 1983 (aged 29)	28	(Greece) Veria
13	MF	Jean Monuma	1 April 1982 (aged 30)	16	(Haiti) Racing Club Haitien
14	MF	Jean Marc Alexandre	24 August 1986 (aged 26)	19	(United States) Orlando City
15	MF	Peter Germain	22 January 1982 (aged 30)	63	(Haiti) Baltimore SC
16	DF	Jean Garry Rubin	19 December 1989 (aged 22)	9	(Haiti) América des Cayes
17	MF	Wiselet Saint-Louis	10 September 1992 (aged 20)	0	(Haiti) Don Bosco
18	GK	Johny Placide	29 January 1988 (aged 24)	7	(France) Le Havre
19	FW	Fritznel Louis	20 December 1989 (aged 22)	7	(Haiti) Baltimore SC
21	GK	Peterson Occénat	3 December 1989 (aged 23)	10	(Haiti) Aigle Noir
23	MF	Pascal Milien	5 March 1986 (aged 26)	7	(Republic of Ireland) Sligo Rovers

=== Jamaica ===
Head coach: (Jamaica) Theodore Whitmore

No.	Pos.	Player	Date of birth (age)	Caps	Goals	Club
13	GK	Dwayne Miller	14 July 1987 (aged 25)	27	0	(Swedish Football Association) Syrianska
21	GK	Jacomeno Barrett	3 December 1984 (aged 28)	3	0	(Jamaica Football Federation) Montego Bay United
-	GK	Duwayne Kerr	16 January 1987 (aged 25)	6	0	(Norwegian Football Federation) Strømmen
6	DF	Lovel Palmer	30 August 1984 (aged 28)	24	0	(United States Soccer Federation) Portland Timbers
-	DF	Xavean Virgo	25 October 1985 (aged 27)	16	1	(Jamaica Football Federation) Boys' Town
22	DF	Shavar Thomas	29 January 1981 (aged 31)	43	0	(Canadian Soccer Association) Montreal Impact
3	DF	Dicoy Williams	7 October 1986 (aged 26)	9	0	(Canadian Soccer Association) Toronto FC
-	DF	Montrose Phinn	25 November 1987 (aged 25)	2	0	(Jamaica Football Federation) Harbour View
-	DF	Alvas Powell	18 July 1994 (aged 18)	0	0	(Jamaica Football Federation) Portmore United
16	MF	Demar Phillips	23 September 1983 (aged 29)	45	8	(Norwegian Football Federation) Aalesund
20	MF	Andrae Campbell	14 April 1989 (aged 23)	5	0	(Jamaica Football Federation) Waterhouse
23	MF	Ewan Grandison	28 January 1991 (aged 21)	2	0	(Jamaica Football Federation) Portmore United
7	MF	Jason Morrison	7 June 1984 (aged 28)	28	1	(Norwegian Football Federation) Aalesund
-	MF	Rohan Reid	11 March 1981 (aged 31)	2	0	(Jamaica Football Federation) Arnett Gardens
16	MF	Jermaine Hue	15 June 1978 (aged 34)	36	12	(Jamaica Football Federation) Harbour View
-	MF	Keammar Daley	18 February 1988 (aged 24)	21	2	(The Football Association) Preston North End
-	MF	Ricardo Gardner	25 September 1978 (aged 34)	109	9	(The Football Association) Bolton Wanderers
-	MF	Lamar Nelson	19 August 1991 (aged 21)	0	1	(Jamaica Football Federation) Arnett Gardens F.C.
9	FW	Ryan Johnson	26 November 1984 (aged 28)	21	8	(Canadian Soccer Association) Toronto FC
10	FW	Omar Cummings	13 July 1982 (aged 30)	30	7	(United States Soccer Federation) Colorado Rapids
-	FW	Tremaine Stewart	5 January 1988 (aged 24)	6	1	(Norwegian Football Federation) Aalesund
-	FW	Darren Mattocks	2 September 1990 (aged 22)	2	0	(Canadian Soccer Association) Vancouver Whitecaps
-	FW	Jermaine 'Tuffy' Anderson	22 February 1979 (aged 33)	0	0	(Jamaica Football Federation) Waterhouse
