= 2013 CONCACAF Gold Cup squads =

Each team could register a squad of 23 players, three of whom had to be goalkeepers. Between the completion of the group stage and the start of the knockout stage, teams which reached the quarter-finals could replace up to four players in their squads but had to be drawn from a provisional list of 35 players.

A list of provisional squads featuring 35 players, consisting of short-listed players, was released on 31 May 2013. The statistics in the tables below represent player profiles as of the beginning of the tournament. See individual player articles for current statistics.

== Group A ==
=== Canada ===
Head coach: Colin Miller

No.	Pos.	Player	Date of birth (age)	Caps	Goals	Club
1	GK	Lars Hirschfeld	17 October 1978 (aged 34)	46	0	(Norwegian Football Federation) Vålerenga
2	MF	Nikolas Ledgerwood	16 January 1985 (aged 28)	26	0	(Swedish Football Association) Hammarby IF
3	DF	Ashtone Morgan	9 February 1991 (aged 22)	6	0	(Canadian Soccer Association) Toronto FC
4	FW	Kyle Porter (Note: Replaced Nana Attakora.)	19 January 1990 (aged 23)	2	0	(United States Soccer Federation) D.C. United
5	DF	David Edgar	19 May 1987 (aged 26)	17	1	(The Football Association) Burnley
6	MF	Julian de Guzman	25 March 1981 (aged 32)	64	4	(German Football Association) Jahn Regensburg
7	MF	Russell Teibert	22 December 1992 (aged 20)	3	0	(Canadian Soccer Association) Vancouver Whitecaps FC
8	MF	Will Johnson (captain)	21 January 1987 (aged 26)	33	3	(United States Soccer Federation) Portland Timbers
9	FW	Tosaint Ricketts	6 August 1987 (aged 25)	23	5	(Norwegian Football Federation) Sandnes Ulf
10	FW	Simeon Jackson	28 March 1987 (aged 26)	35	6	(German Football Association) Eintracht Braunschweig
11	FW	Marcus Haber	11 January 1989 (aged 24)	6	1	(The Football Association) Stevenage
12	MF	Issey Nakajima-Farran	16 May 1984 (aged 29)	26	1	(Cyprus Football Association) Alki Larnaca
13	MF	Pedro Pacheco	27 June 1984 (aged 29)	11	0	(Portuguese Football Federation) Santa Clara
14	MF	Samuel Piette	12 November 1994 (aged 18)	2	0	(German Football Association) Fortuna Düsseldorf II
15	MF	Kyle Bekker	2 September 1990 (aged 22)	5	0	(Canadian Soccer Association) Toronto FC
16	FW	Randy Edwini-Bonsu	20 April 1990 (aged 23)	4	0	(German Football Association) Eintracht Braunschweig
17	DF	Marcel de Jong	15 October 1986 (aged 26)	23	1	(German Football Association) FC Augsburg
18	GK	Milan Borjan	23 October 1987 (aged 25)	11	0	(Turkish Football Federation) Sivasspor
19	DF	Adam Straith	11 September 1990 (aged 22)	11	0	(German Football Association) 1. FC Saarbrucken
20	DF	Doneil Henry	20 April 1993 (aged 20)	4	0	(Canadian Soccer Association) Toronto FC
21	MF	Jonathan Osorio	12 June 1992 (aged 21)	1	0	(Canadian Soccer Association) Toronto FC
22	GK	Simon Thomas	12 April 1990 (aged 23)	2	0	(Canadian Soccer Association) Vancouver Whitecaps FC
23	MF	Keven Alemán	25 March 1994 (aged 19)	0	0	(Royal Spanish Football Federation) Valladolid

=== Martinique ===
Head coach: (France) Patrick Cavelan

No.	Pos.	Player	Date of birth (age)	Caps	Goals	Club
1	GK	Emmanuel Vermignon	20 January 1989 (aged 24)	10	0	(Ligue de football de la Martinique) Club Colonial
2	DF	Nicolas Zaïre	7 December 1986 (aged 26)	17	1	(Ligue de football de la Martinique) Rivière-Pilote
3	DF	Lionel Ravi	12 November 1985 (aged 27)	5	0	(Ligue de football de la Martinique) Club Franciscain
4	MF	Daniel Hérelle	17 October 1988 (aged 24)	32	0	(Ligue de football de la Martinique) Club Colonial
5	MF	Gaël Germany	10 May 1983 (aged 30)	19	3	(French Football Federation) Paris FC
6	DF	William Sery	20 March 1988 (aged 25)	7	0	(French Football Federation) Raon-l'Étape
7	FW	Steve Gustan	26 November 1985 (aged 27)	0	0	(Ligue de football de la Martinique) Club Franciscain
8	DF	Audrick Linord	17 April 1987 (aged 26)	11	0	(French Football Federation) Romorantin
9	FW	Frédéric Piquionne	8 December 1978 (aged 34)	5	2	(United States Soccer Federation) Portland Timbers
10	FW	Kevin Tresfield	11 April 1988 (aged 25)	10	3	(Ligue de football de la Martinique) Club Franciscain
11	FW	Yoann Arquin	15 April 1988 (aged 25)	0	0	(The Football Association) Notts County
12	DF	Jacky Berdix	29 August 1979 (aged 33)	14	1	(Ligue de football de la Martinique) Case-Pilote
13	MF	Olivier Thomert	28 May 1980 (aged 33)	0	0	(French Football Federation) Le Mans
14	MF	Fabrice Reuperné	18 September 1975 (aged 37)	24	1	(Ligue de football de la Martinique) Golden Star
15	MF	Jordy Delem	18 March 1993 (aged 20)	14	3	(Ligue de football de la Martinique) Club Franciscain
16	GK	Loïc Chauvet	30 April 1988 (aged 25)	2	0	(Ligue de football de la Martinique) Golden Star
17	FW	Kévin Parsemain (captain)	12 February 1988 (aged 25)	29	20	(Ligue de football de la Martinique) Rivière-Pilote
18	DF	Grégory Arnolin	10 November 1980 (aged 32)	0	0	(Royal Spanish Football Federation) Sporting Gijón
19	FW	Mathias Coureur	22 March 1988 (aged 25)	0	0	(Ligue de football de la Martinique) Golden Lion
20	MF	Stéphane Abaul	23 November 1991 (aged 21)	17	2	(Ligue de football de la Martinique) Club Franciscain
21	DF	Sébastien Crétinoir	12 February 1986 (aged 27)	22	0	(Ligue de football de la Martinique) Club Colonial
22	DF	Jean-Sylvain Babin	14 October 1986 (aged 26)	0	0	(Royal Spanish Football Federation) Alcorcón
23	GK	Kévin Olimpa	10 March 1988 (aged 25)	3	0	(French Football Federation) Bordeaux

=== Mexico ===
Head coach: José Manuel de la Torre

No.	Pos.	Player	Date of birth (age)	Caps	Goals	Club
1	GK	Jonathan Orozco	12 May 1986 (aged 27)	2	0	(Mexican Football Federation) Monterrey
2	DF	Israel Jiménez	13 August 1989 (aged 23)	5	0	(Mexican Football Federation) Tigres UANL
3	DF	Leobardo López	4 September 1983 (aged 29)	9	1	(Mexican Football Federation) Monterrey
4	DF	Joel Huiqui (captain)	18 February 1983 (aged 30)	9	1	(Mexican Football Federation) Morelia
5	DF	Dárvin Chávez	21 November 1989 (aged 23)	3	0	(Mexican Football Federation) Monterrey
6	MF	Carlos Peña	29 March 1990 (aged 23)	2	0	(Mexican Football Federation) León
7	MF	Javier Cortés	20 July 1989 (aged 23)	2	0	(Mexican Football Federation) Pumas UNAM
8	MF	Luis Montes	16 May 1986 (aged 27)	1	0	(Mexican Football Federation) León
9	FW	Raúl Jiménez (Note: Replaced David Cabrera.)	5 May 1991 (aged 22)	9	0	(Mexican Football Federation) América
10	MF	Marco Fabián	21 July 1989 (aged 23)	5	1	(Mexican Football Federation) Guadalajara
11	FW	Rafael Márquez Lugo	2 November 1981 (aged 31)	11	1	(Mexican Football Federation) Guadalajara
12	GK	Alfredo Talavera	18 September 1982 (aged 30)	11	0	(Mexican Football Federation) Toluca
13	DF	Adrián Aldrete	14 June 1988 (aged 25)	9	0	(Mexican Football Federation) América
14	MF	Jorge Enríquez	8 January 1991 (aged 22)	5	0	(Mexican Football Federation) Guadalajara
15	DF	Efraín Velarde	18 April 1986 (aged 27)	1	0	(Mexican Football Federation) Pumas UNAM
16	DF	Miguel Ángel Ponce	12 April 1989 (aged 24)	2	0	(Mexican Football Federation) Guadalajara
17	MF	Isaác Brizuela	28 August 1990 (aged 22)	0	0	(Mexican Football Federation) Toluca
18	DF	Juan Carlos Valenzuela	15 March 1984 (aged 29)	9	0	(Mexican Football Federation) América
19	DF	Miguel Layún	25 June 1988 (aged 25)	0	0	(Mexican Football Federation) América
20	DF	Jair Pereira	7 July 1986 (aged 27)	0	0	(Mexican Football Federation) Cruz Azul
21	FW	Javier Orozco	16 November 1987 (aged 25)	3	0	(Mexican Football Federation) Santos Laguna
22	MF	Alejandro Castro	27 March 1987 (aged 26)	0	0	(Mexican Football Federation) Cruz Azul
23	GK	Moisés Muñoz	1 February 1980 (aged 33)	8	0	(Mexican Football Federation) América
24	FW	José María Cárdenas (Note: Replaced Darvin Chavez.)	2 May 1985 (aged 28)	3	1	(Mexican Football Federation) Morelia

=== Panama ===
Head coach: Julio Dely Valdés

No.	Pos.	Player	Date of birth (age)	Caps	Goals	Club
1	GK	Jaime Penedo	26 September 1981 (aged 31)	85	0	(National Football Federation of Guatemala) Municipal
2	DF	Leonel Parris	13 June 1982 (aged 31)	15	0	(Panamanian Football Federation) Tauro
3	DF	Harold Cummings	1 March 1992 (aged 21)	14	0	(Panamanian Football Federation) Árabe Unido
4	DF	Carlos Rodríguez	12 April 1990 (aged 23)	15	0	(Panamanian Football Federation) Chepo
5	DF	Román Torres (captain)	20 March 1986 (aged 27)	69	2	(Colombian Football Federation) Millonarios
6	MF	Gabriel Gómez	29 May 1984 (aged 29)	85	9	(Colombian Football Federation) Junior Barranquilla
7	FW	Blas Pérez	13 March 1981 (aged 32)	76	29	(United States Soccer Federation) FC Dallas
8	MF	Marcos Sánchez	23 December 1989 (aged 23)	22	2	(Panamanian Football Federation) Tauro
9	FW	Gabriel Torres	31 October 1988 (aged 24)	35	2	(Venezuelan Football Federation) Zamora
10	MF	Eybir Bonaga	19 May 1986 (aged 27)	18	2	(Slovak Football Association) Ružomberok
11	FW	Cecilio Waterman	13 April 1991 (aged 22)	2	0	(Uruguayan Football Association) Fénix
12	GK	Luis Mejía	16 March 1991 (aged 22)	11	0	(Uruguayan Football Association) Fénix
13	DF	Jean Cedeño	9 July 1985 (aged 27)	20	0	(Panamanian Football Federation) Alianza
14	MF	Juan Pérez	1 January 1980 (aged 33)	35	0	(Panamanian Football Federation) Tauro
15	GK	Álex Rodríguez	5 August 1990 (aged 22)	2	0	(Panamanian Football Federation) Sporting San Miguelito
16	FW	Rolando Blackburn	9 January 1990 (aged 23)	12	3	(Panamanian Football Federation) Chorrillo
17	DF	Roderick Miller	3 April 1992 (aged 21)	9	0	(Panamanian Football Federation) San Francisco
18	MF	Jairo Jiménez	7 January 1993 (aged 20)	1	0	(Royal Spanish Football Federation) Elche
19	MF	Alberto Quintero	18 December 1987 (aged 25)	33	3	(Panamanian Football Federation) Chorrillo
20	MF	Aníbal Godoy	10 February 1990 (aged 23)	34	0	(Panamanian Football Federation) Chepo
21	DF	Richard Dixon	28 March 1992 (aged 21)	0	0	(Panamanian Football Federation) Sporting San Miguelito
22	MF	Rolando Escobar	24 October 1981 (aged 31)	26	7	(Venezuelan Football Federation) Deportivo Anzoátegui
23	DF	Roberto Chen	24 May 1994 (aged 19)	2	0	(Panamanian Football Federation) San Francisco

== Group B ==
=== El Salvador ===
Head coach: (Peru) Agustín Castillo

No.	Pos.	Player	Date of birth (age)	Caps	Goals	Club
1	GK	Dagoberto Portillo	16 November 1979 (aged 33)	26	0	(Salvadoran Football Federation) Luis Ángel Firpo
2	DF	Xavier García	26 June 1990 (aged 23)	36	1	(Salvadoran Football Federation) Luis Ángel Firpo
3	DF	Víctor Turcios (captain)	13 April 1988 (aged 25)	37	1	(Football Association of Finland) RoPS
4	DF	Steve Purdy	5 February 1985 (aged 28)	14	1	(United States Soccer Federation) Chivas USA
5	DF	José Miguel Granadino	28 September 1988 (aged 24)	6	0	(Salvadoran Football Federation) FAS
6	MF	Richard Menjivar	31 October 1990 (aged 22)	6	0	(United States Soccer Federation) Atlanta Silverbacks
7	MF	Darwin Ceren	31 December 1989 (aged 23)	12	1	(Salvadoran Football Federation) Juventud Independiente
8	MF	Osael Romero	8 April 1986 (aged 27)	74	16	(Salvadoran Football Federation) Alianza
9	FW	Rafael Burgos	3 June 1988 (aged 25)	28	10	(Hungarian Football Federation) Kecskeméti
10	MF	Kevin Santamaria	21 January 1991 (aged 22)	1	0	(Salvadoran Football Federation) Santa Tecla
11	FW	Rodolfo Zelaya	3 July 1988 (aged 25)	33	13	(Salvadoran Football Federation) Alianza
12	MF	Andrés Flores	31 August 1990 (aged 22)	27	0	(Salvadoran Football Federation) Isidro Metapán
13	DF	Alexander Larín	27 June 1992 (aged 21)	7	0	(Salvadoran Football Federation) FAS
14	FW	Dustin Corea	21 March 1992 (aged 21)	1	0	(Danish Football Association) Skive
15	MF	Darwin Bonilla	6 August 1990 (aged 22)	5	0	(Salvadoran Football Federation) Águila
16	DF	Marcelo Posadas (Note: Replaced Jaime Alas.)	24 July 1989 (aged 23)	0	0	(Salvadoran Football Federation) Santa Tecla
17	FW	Léster Blanco	17 February 1989 (aged 24)	30	5	(Salvadoran Football Federation) Isidro Metapán
18	GK	Benji Villalobos	15 July 1988 (aged 24)	8	0	(Salvadoran Football Federation) Águila
19	MF	Gerson Mayen	9 February 1989 (aged 24)	3	0	(Salvadoran Football Federation) FAS
20	FW	Odir Flores	13 May 1988 (aged 25)	2	0	(Salvadoran Football Federation) Alianza
21	MF	Néstor Renderos	10 September 1988 (aged 24)	2	0	(Salvadoran Football Federation) FAS
22	GK	Derby Carrillo	19 September 1987 (aged 25)	3	0	(Salvadoran Football Federation) Santa Tecla
23	DF	José Henríquez (Note: Replaced Isidro Gutiérrez.)	24 May 1987 (aged 26)	33	0	(Salvadoran Football Federation) Águila

=== Haiti ===
Head coach: (Cuba) Israel Blake Cantero

No.	Pos.	Player	Date of birth (age)	Caps	Goals	Club
1	GK	Frandy Montrévil	14 January 1982 (aged 31)	9	0	(Haitian Football Federation) Valencia de Leogane
2	MF	Jean Sony Alcenat	23 January 1986 (aged 27)	46	5	(Romanian Football Federation) Petrolul Ploiești
3	DF	Mechack Jérôme	21 April 1990 (aged 23)	25	0	(United States Soccer Federation) Sporting Kansas City
4	DF	Wilde-Donald Guerrier	31 March 1989 (aged 24)	15	2	(Haitian Football Federation) América des Cayes
5	DF	Jean-Jacques Pierre	23 January 1981 (aged 32)	56	5	(French Football Federation) Caen
6	DF	Kevin Lafrance	13 January 1990 (aged 23)	11	2	(Football Association of the Czech Republic) Baník Most
7	MF	Jeff Louis	8 August 1992 (aged 20)	10	0	(French Football Federation) Nancy
8	DF	Judelin Aveska	21 October 1987 (aged 25)	33	1	(Argentine Football Association) Independiente Rivadavia
9	FW	Kervens Belfort	16 May 1992 (aged 21)	11	5	(French Football Federation) Le Mans
10	FW	Peguero Jean Philippe	29 September 1981 (aged 31)	27	21	(Haitian Football Federation) Don Bosco
11	FW	Jean-Eudes Maurice	21 June 1986 (aged 27)	13	9	(French Football Federation) Le Mans
12	GK	Julien Jospy	3 June 1983 (aged 30)	1	0	(Haitian Football Federation) Cavaly
13	MF	Monuma Constant Jr.	1 April 1982 (aged 31)	25	4	(Haitian Football Federation) Racing Haïtien
14	MF	Peterson Joseph	24 April 1990 (aged 23)	16	0	(United States Soccer Federation) Sporting Kansas City
15	MF	Yves Desmarets	17 July 1979 (aged 33)	3	0	(Portuguese Football Federation) Os Belenenses
16	FW	Jean Alexandre (captain)	24 August 1986 (aged 26)	26	2	(United States Soccer Federation) Orlando City SC
17	MF	Charles Hérold Jr.	23 July 1990 (aged 22)	12	1	(Haitian Football Federation) Tempête
18	FW	Leonel Saint-Preux	12 May 1985 (aged 28)	39	6	(Football Association of Malaysia) FELDA United
19	DF	Kim Jaggy	14 November 1982 (aged 30)	4	1	(Swiss Football Association) Wil
20	DF	Olrish Saurel	13 September 1985 (aged 27)	19	2	(Antigua and Barbuda Football Association) Antigua Barracuda
21	GK	Ronald Elusma	8 September 1993 (aged 19)	0	0	(Haitian Football Federation) Victory
22	DF	Ricardo Adé	21 May 1990 (aged 23)	0	0	(Haitian Football Federation) Baltimore
23	MF	Pascal Millien	3 May 1986 (aged 27)	12	1	(Football Association of Ireland) Sligo Rovers

=== Honduras ===
Head coach: (Colombia) Luis Fernando Suárez

No.	Pos.	Player	Date of birth (age)	Caps	Goals	Club
1	GK	José Mendoza	13 April 1989 (aged 24)	1	0	(National Autonomous Federation of Football of Honduras) Platense
2	DF	Osman Chávez (captain)	29 July 1984 (aged 28)	47	0	(Polish Football Association) Wisła Kraków
3	DF	Brayan Beckeles	28 November 1985 (aged 27)	12	1	(National Autonomous Federation of Football of Honduras) Olimpia
4	DF	Johnny Palacios	20 December 1986 (aged 26)	15	0	(National Autonomous Federation of Football of Honduras) Olimpia
5	DF	David Velásquez	8 December 1989 (aged 23)	3	0	(National Autonomous Federation of Football of Honduras) Victoria
6	DF	Juan Carlos García	8 March 1988 (aged 25)	24	1	(National Autonomous Federation of Football of Honduras) Olimpia
7	FW	Diego Reyes	7 July 1992 (aged 21)	0	0	(National Autonomous Federation of Football of Honduras) Real Sociedad
8	MF	Gerson Rodas	6 July 1990 (aged 23)	0	0	(National Autonomous Federation of Football of Honduras) Real España
9	FW	Jerry Palacios	1 November 1981 (aged 31)	16	4	(Costa Rican Football Federation) Alajuelense
10	MF	Mario Martínez	July 30, 1989 (aged 23)	31	3	(United States Soccer Federation) Seattle Sounders FC
11	FW	Rony Martínez	16 October 1988 (aged 24)	0	0	(National Autonomous Federation of Football of Honduras) Real Sociedad
12	DF	Orlin Peralta	12 February 1990 (aged 23)	4	0	(National Autonomous Federation of Football of Honduras) Motagua
13	DF	Nery Medina (Note: Replaced José Walter Williams.)	5 August 1981 (aged 31)	12	0	(National Autonomous Federation of Football of Honduras) Motagua
14	MF	Andy Najar	16 March 1993 (aged 20)	5	0	(Royal Belgian Football Association) Anderlecht
15	MF	Mario Berríos	29 May 1982 (aged 31)	16	0	(National Autonomous Federation of Football of Honduras) Marathón
16	MF	Alexander López	6 May 1992 (aged 21)	3	0	(National Autonomous Federation of Football of Honduras) Olimpia
17	MF	Marvin Chávez	3 November 1983 (aged 29)	32	3	(United States Soccer Federation) San Jose Earthquakes
18	GK	Kevin Hernández	21 December 1985 (aged 27)	2	0	(National Autonomous Federation of Football of Honduras) Real España
19	MF	Wilmer Fuentes (Note: Replaced Luis Garrido.)	21 April 1992 (aged 21)	2	0	(National Autonomous Federation of Football of Honduras) Marathón
20	MF	Jorge Claros	8 January 1986 (aged 27)	37	2	(Scottish Football Association) Hibernian
21	FW	Roger Rojas	9 June 1990 (aged 23)	18	3	(National Autonomous Federation of Football of Honduras) Olimpia
22	GK	Donis Escober	3 February 1980 (aged 33)	21	0	(National Autonomous Federation of Football of Honduras) Olimpia
23	MF	Edder Delgado (Note: Replaced Efraín López.)	20 November 1986 (aged 26)	18	0	(National Autonomous Federation of Football of Honduras) Real España
24	DF	Erick Norales (Note: Replaced Johnny Palacios.)	11 February 1985 (aged 28)	29	2	(National Autonomous Federation of Football of Honduras) Marathón

=== Trinidad and Tobago ===
Head coach: Stephen Hart

No.	Pos.	Player	Date of birth (age)	Caps	Goals	Club
1	GK	Marvin Phillip	1 August 1984 (aged 28)	41	0	(Trinidad and Tobago Football Association) Central
3	MF	Joevin Jones	3 August 1991 (aged 21)	28	0	(Trinidad and Tobago Football Association) W Connection
5	DF	Carlyle Mitchell	8 August 1987 (aged 25)	18	0	(Canadian Soccer Association) Vancouver Whitecaps FC
6	DF	Daneil Cyrus	15 December 1990 (aged 22)	28	0	(Trinidad and Tobago Football Association) W Connection
7	MF	Chris Birchall	4 May 1984 (aged 29)	42	4	(The Football Association) Port Vale
8	MF	Khaleem Hyland	5 June 1989 (aged 24)	33	3	(Royal Belgian Football Association) Genk
9	FW	Kenwyne Jones	5 October 1984 (aged 28)	52	7	(The Football Association) Stoke City
10	MF	Kevin Molino	17 June 1990 (aged 23)	17	3	(United States Soccer Federation) Orlando City SC
11	FW	Carlos Edwards	24 October 1978 (aged 34)	83	4	(The Football Association) Ipswich Town
12	MF	Darryl Roberts	26 September 1983 (aged 29)	25	6	(Turkish Football Federation) Samsunspor
13	FW	Cornell Glen	21 October 1980 (aged 32)	66	23	(All India Football Federation) Shillong Lajong
14	MF	Andre Boucaud	10 October 1984 (aged 28)	8	0	(The Football Association) Notts County
16	MF	Kevon Carter	14 October 1983 (aged 29)	29	5	(Trinidad and Tobago Football Association) Defence Force
17	DF	Justin Hoyte	20 November 1984 (aged 28)	2	0	(The Football Association) Middlesbrough
18	MF	Densill Theobald (captain)	27 June 1982 (aged 31)	93	2	(Trinidad and Tobago Football Association) Caledonia AIA
19	MF	Keon Daniel	16 January 1987 (aged 26)	56	13	(United States Soccer Federation) Philadelphia Union
20	DF	Seon Power	2 February 1984 (aged 29)	40	2	(Football Association of Thailand) Chainat
21	GK	Jan-Michael Williams	26 October 1984 (aged 28)	49	0	(Trinidad and Tobago Football Association) St. Ann's Rangers
22	GK	Cleon John	25 January 1981 (aged 32)	3	0	(Trinidad and Tobago Football Association) Defence Force
23	FW	Jamal Gay	9 February 1989 (aged 24)	18	7	(Trinidad and Tobago Football Association) Caledonia AIA
25	DF	Aubrey David	11 October 1990 (aged 22)	10	1	(Trinidad and Tobago Football Association) Caledonia AIA
26	DF	Curtis Gonzales (Note: Replaced Ataullah Guerra.)	26 January 1989 (aged 24)	11	0	(Trinidad and Tobago Football Association) Defence Force
27	MF	Kevan George (Note: Replaced Khaleem Hyland.)	30 January 1990 (aged 23)	0	0	(United States Soccer Federation) Columbus Crew
32	DF	Radanfah Abu Bakr	12 February 1987 (aged 26)	10	1	(Kazakhstan Football Federation) Vostok

== Group C ==
=== Belize ===
Head coach: (United States) Ian Mork

No.	Pos.	Player	Date of birth (age)	Caps	Goals	Club
1	GK	Woodrow West	19 September 1985 (aged 27)	14	0	(Football Federation of Belize) Belmopan Bandits
2	MF	David Trapp	5 August 1981 (aged 31)	13	0	(Football Federation of Belize) Belmopan Bandits
3	MF	Trevor Lennan	5 June 1983 (aged 30)	17	1	(Football Federation of Belize) Police United
5	DF	Kahlil Velasquez	13 August 1985 (aged 27)	1	0	(Football Federation of Belize) Belize Defence Force
6	FW	Evan Mariano	20 January 1988 (aged 25)	7	0	(Football Federation of Belize) Police United
7	DF	Ian Gaynair	26 February 1986 (aged 27)	27	0	(Football Federation of Belize) Belmopan Bandits
8	DF	Elroy Smith (captain)	30 November 1981 (aged 31)	31	2	(National Autonomous Federation of Football of Honduras) Platense
9	FW	Deon McCaulay	20 September 1987 (aged 25)	26	16	(Football Federation of Belize) Belmopan Bandits
10	FW	Harrison Róchez	29 November 1983 (aged 29)	28	4	(National Autonomous Federation of Football of Honduras) Marathón
11	FW	Michael Salazar	15 November 1992 (aged 20)	1	0	(United States Soccer Federation) UC Riverside Highlanders
12	DF	Cristobal Gilharry (Note: Replaced Elroy Kuylen.)	2 September 1980 (aged 32)	7	0	(Football Federation of Belize) FC Belize
13	DF	Dalton Eiley	10 December 1983 (aged 29)	24	0	(Football Federation of Belize) Placencia Assassins
14	MF	Andrés Makin	11 April 1992 (aged 21)	4	0	(Football Federation of Belize) Police United
16	FW	Ashley Torres	15 September 1985 (aged 27)	4	0	(Football Federation of Belize) Placencia Assassins
18	DF	Evral Trapp	22 January 1987 (aged 26)	13	0	(Football Federation of Belize) Verdes
20	FW	Daniel Jimenez	14 April 1988 (aged 25)	14	2	(Football Federation of Belize) Police United
22	GK	Frank Lopez	3 March 1989 (aged 24)	0	0	(Football Federation of Belize) Belize Defence Force
23	DF	Tyrone Pandy	14 January 1986 (aged 27)	7	0	(Football Federation of Belize) Belize Defence Force
24	FW	Lennox Castillo	19 November 1985 (aged 27)	3	0	(Football Federation of Belize) Police United
25	MF	Devon Makin	11 November 1990 (aged 22)	5	0	(Football Federation of Belize) Police United
27	GK	Shane Orio	7 August 1980 (aged 32)	22	0	(National Autonomous Federation of Football of Honduras) Marathón
28	MF	Harrison Tasher	5 January 1985 (aged 28)	11	0	(Football Federation of Belize) Belize Defence Force
30	MF	Luis Torres	2 March 1993 (aged 20)	1	0	(Football Federation of Belize) Placencia Assassins

=== Costa Rica ===
Head coach: (Colombia) Jorge Luis Pinto

No.	Pos.	Player	Date of birth (age)	Caps	Goals	Club
1	GK	Leonel Moreira	4 April 1990 (aged 23)	3	0	(Costa Rican Football Federation) Herediano
2	DF	Kendall Waston (Note: Replaced Jhonny Acosta.)	1 January 1988 (aged 25)	0	0	(Costa Rican Football Federation) Saprissa
3	DF	Giancarlo González	8 February 1988 (aged 25)	23	2	(Norwegian Football Federation) Vålerenga
4	DF	Michael Umaña	16 July 1982 (aged 30)	69	1	(Costa Rican Football Federation) Saprissa
5	MF	Celso Borges	27 May 1988 (aged 25)	49	11	(Swedish Football Association) AIK
6	DF	Juan Diego Madrigal	21 May 1987 (aged 26)	5	0	(Costa Rican Football Federation) Saprissa
7	MF	Mauricio Castillo	17 March 1992 (aged 21)	4	0	(Costa Rican Football Federation) Saprissa
8	FW	Kenny Cunningham	7 June 1985 (aged 28)	6	1	(Bolivian Football Federation) The Strongest
9	FW	Álvaro Saborío (captain)	25 March 1982 (aged 31)	85	30	(United States Soccer Federation) Real Salt Lake
10	MF	Osvaldo Rodríguez	17 December 1990 (aged 22)	7	0	(Costa Rican Football Federation) Santos de Guápiles
11	FW	Michael Barrantes	4 October 1983 (aged 29)	46	2	(Norwegian Football Federation) Aalesund
12	FW	Yendrick Ruiz	4 December 1987 (aged 25)	1	0	(Costa Rican Football Federation) Herediano
13	MF	Ariel Rodríguez	22 April 1986 (aged 27)	12	0	(Costa Rican Football Federation) Alajuelense
14	DF	Christopher Meneses	2 May 1990 (aged 23)	11	0	(Swedish Football Association) Norrköping
15	DF	Junior Díaz	12 September 1983 (aged 29)	52	1	(German Football Association) Mainz 05
16	DF	Carlos Johnson	17 March 1984 (aged 29)	11	0	(Costa Rican Football Federation) Cartaginés
17	MF	Yeltsin Tejeda	17 March 1992 (aged 21)	11	0	(Costa Rican Football Federation) Saprissa
18	GK	Patrick Pemberton	24 April 1982 (aged 31)	12	0	(Costa Rican Football Federation) Alajuelense
19	DF	Roy Miller	24 November 1984 (aged 28)	41	1	(United States Soccer Federation) New York Red Bulls
20	MF	Rodney Wallace	June 17, 1988 (aged 25)	14	3	(United States Soccer Federation) Portland Timbers
21	MF	Esteban Granados	14 February 1987 (aged 26)	9	0	(Costa Rican Football Federation) Herediano
22	FW	Jairo Arrieta	25 August 1983 (aged 29)	12	3	(United States Soccer Federation) Columbus Crew
23	GK	Luis Torres (Note: Replaced Keylor Navas.)	16 March 1985 (aged 28)	0	0	(Costa Rican Football Federation) Cartaginés

=== Cuba ===
Head coach: Walter Benítez

No.	Pos.	Player	Date of birth (age)	Caps	Goals	Club
1	GK	Odelín Molina	3 August 1974 (aged 38)	116	0	(Football Association of Cuba) Villa Clara
2	DF	Michel Márquez	7 April 1987 (aged 26)	0	0	(Football Association of Cuba) Isla de La Juventud
3	MF	Yénier Márquez	3 January 1979 (aged 34)	107	12	(Football Association of Cuba) Villa Clara
4	DF	Yasmany López	11 October 1987 (aged 25)	0	0	(Football Association of Cuba) Ciego de Avila
5	DF	Jorge Luis Clavelo (captain)	8 August 1982 (aged 30)	39	2	(Football Association of Cuba) Villa Clara
6	DF	Yoel Colomé	15 October 1982 (aged 30)	36	2	(Football Association of Cuba) La Habana
7	MF	Armando Coroneaux	2 July 1985 (aged 28)	14	4	(Football Association of Cuba) Camagüey
8	MF	Jaime Colomé	30 June 1979 (aged 34)	74	11	(Football Association of Cuba) La Habana
9	FW	José Ciprian Alfonso	28 March 1984 (aged 29)	0	0	(Football Association of Cuba) Pinar del Rio
10	MF	Miguel Ángel Sánchez	2 August 1987 (aged 25)	0	0	(Football Association of Cuba) Isla de La Juventud
11	MF	Ariel Martínez	9 May 1986 (aged 27)	35	6	(Football Association of Cuba) Sancti Spíritus
12	GK	Julio Pichardo	10 January 1990 (aged 23)	1	0	(Football Association of Cuba) Las Tunas
13	DF	Jorge Luis Corrales	20 May 1991 (aged 22)	16	0	(Football Association of Cuba) Pinar del Rio
14	DF	Aliannis Urgellés	25 June 1985 (aged 28)	40	2	(Football Association of Cuba) Guantánamo
15	DF	Renay Malblanche	8 August 1991 (aged 21)	10	0	(Football Association of Cuba) Holguín
16	DF	Ángel Horta	17 March 1984 (aged 29)	0	0	(Football Association of Cuba) Camagüey
17	FW	Alexei Zuásnabar	24 April 1985 (aged 28)	6	0	(Football Association of Cuba) Cienfuegos
18	MF	Libán Pérez	5 August 1990 (aged 22)	0	0	(Football Association of Cuba) Camagüey
19	MF	Dairon Blanco	10 February 1992 (aged 21)	0	0	(Football Association of Cuba) Las Tunas
20	MF	Alberto Gómez	12 February 1988 (aged 25)	20	1	(Football Association of Cuba) Guantánamo
21	GK	Diosvelis Guerra	21 August 1989 (aged 23)	0	0	(Football Association of Cuba) Artemisa
22	FW	Yaandri Puga	3 January 1988 (aged 25)	0	0	(Football Association of Cuba) Isla de La Juventud
23	MF	Jesús Rodríguez	23 October 1988 (aged 24)	0	0	(Football Association of Cuba) Ciego de Avila

=== United States ===
Head coach: (Germany) Jürgen Klinsmann

No.	Pos.	Player	Date of birth (age)	Caps	Goals	Club
1	GK	Nick Rimando	17 June 1979 (aged 34)	7	0	(United States Soccer Federation) Real Salt Lake
2	DF	Edgar Castillo	8 October 1986 (aged 26)	11	0	(Mexican Football Federation) Tijuana
3	DF	Corey Ashe	14 March 1986 (aged 27)	0	0	(United States Soccer Federation) Houston Dynamo
4	MF	Michael Orozco	7 February 1986 (aged 27)	5	1	(Mexican Football Federation) Puebla
5	DF	Oguchi Onyewu	13 May 1982 (aged 31)	67	6	(Royal Spanish Football Federation) Malaga CF
6	MF	Joe Corona	9 July 1990 (aged 22)	5	0	(Mexican Football Federation) Tijuana
7	DF	DaMarcus Beasley (captain)	24 May 1982 (aged 31)	104	17	(Mexican Football Federation) Puebla
8	MF	Mix Diskerud	2 October 1990 (aged 22)	4	1	(Norwegian Football Federation) Rosenborg
9	FW	Herculez Gomez	6 April 1982 (aged 31)	22	6	(Mexican Football Federation) Tijuana
10	FW	Landon Donovan	4 March 1982 (aged 31)	145	51	(United States Soccer Federation) Los Angeles Galaxy
11	MF	Stu Holden	1 August 1985 (aged 27)	20	2	(The Football Association) Bolton Wanderers
12	GK	Sean Johnson	31 May 1989 (aged 24)	3	0	(United States Soccer Federation) Chicago Fire
13	DF	Tony Beltran	11 October 1987 (aged 25)	1	0	(United States Soccer Federation) Real Salt Lake
14	MF	Kyle Beckerman	23 April 1982 (aged 31)	25	1	(United States Soccer Federation) Real Salt Lake
15	DF	Michael Parkhurst	24 January 1984 (aged 29)	16	0	(German Football Association) FC Augsburg
16	MF	José Torres	29 October 1987 (aged 25)	21	0	(Mexican Football Federation) Tigres UANL
17	FW	Will Bruin	24 October 1989 (aged 23)	2	0	(United States Soccer Federation) Houston Dynamo
18	FW	Jack McInerney	5 August 1992 (aged 20)	0	0	(United States Soccer Federation) Philadelphia Union
19	FW	Chris Wondolowski	29 January 1983 (aged 30)	10	1	(United States Soccer Federation) San Jose Earthquakes
20	MF	Alejandro Bedoya	29 April 1987 (aged 26)	15	1	(Swedish Football Association) Helsingborg
21	DF	Clarence Goodson	17 May 1982 (aged 31)	37	4	(United States Soccer Federation) San Jose Earthquakes
22	GK	Bill Hamid	25 November 1990 (aged 22)	1	0	(United States Soccer Federation) D.C. United
23	MF	Brek Shea (Note: Replaced Josh Gatt.)	28 February 1990 (aged 23)	17	0	(The Football Association) Stoke City
24	DF	Omar Gonzalez (Note: Replaced Corey Ashe.)	11 October 1988 (aged 24)	11	0	(United States Soccer Federation) Los Angeles Galaxy
25	DF	Matt Besler (Note: Replaced Oguchi Onyewu.)	11 February 1987 (aged 26)	7	0	(United States Soccer Federation) Sporting Kansas City
26	FW	Eddie Johnson (Note: Replaced Jack McInerney.)	31 March 1984 (aged 29)	53	15	(United States Soccer Federation) Seattle Sounders FC
27	FW	Alan Gordon (Note: Replaced Herculez Gomez.)	16 October 1981 (aged 31)	1	0	(United States Soccer Federation) San Jose Earthquakes

== Notes ==
Replacements after squad submission:

Replacements after group stage:
