= Omaja =

- Village
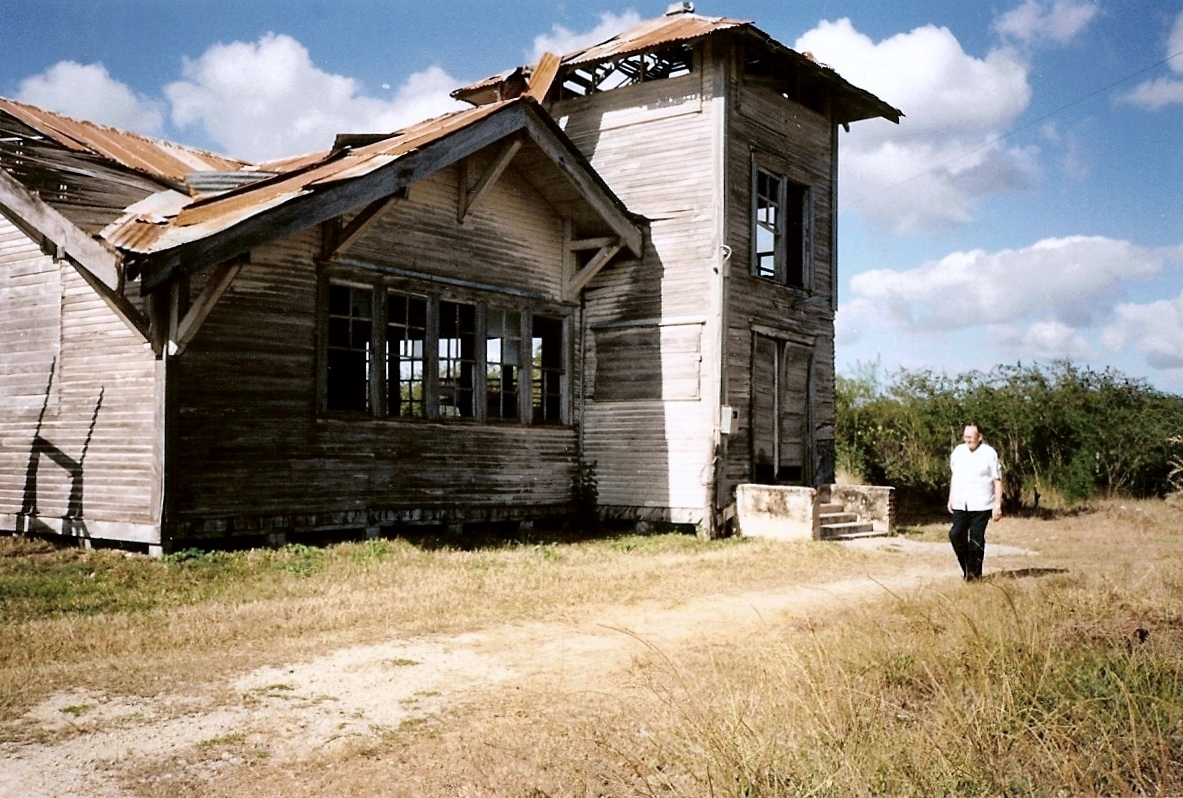
- Ruins of the original Methodist church of Omaja

- Location of Omaja in Cuba
- Coordinates: 20°50′18″N 76°44′40″W
- Country: Cuba
- Province: Las Tunas
- Municipality: Majibacoa
- Founded: 1905
- Elevation: 90 m (300 ft)

Population (2011)
  - Total: 6,150
- Time zone: UTC-5 (EST)
- Area code: +53-31

Omaja is a small town and consejo popular of the municipality of Majibacoa, Cuba. It is located in the eastern part of the province, 50 kilometers southwest of Holguín and 20 in the east of Las Tunas.

== History ==
The land in the area was sold for a trifle by Lico López to American D. E. Kerr and his neocolonizing retinue. The town of Omaja was settled by American Methodists. In the year 1905, the Americans who had settled there, without wasting any time, began the construction of a town with the architecture of the American west. The streets were named after the men who bought them: Kreider, Frankbert, Blasser, etc. Unlike the majority of other towns in Cuba, Omaja has no Roman Catholic church or establishment, due to it remaining a small, Methodist town since its founding. However, in the past at least, there was a small population of Catholics who would have a monthly mass with a priest from another town.

Between 1906 and 1909, just outside town was the Finnish Utopian community of Ponnistus. Founded by Oscar Norring, a merchant seaman, and William Keskinen. The community was mostly Finnish-American loggers, miners, and craftsmen. Norringhad been in the employ of the Buenvista Fruit Company and his vision for the community was as a citrus grove. Lack of water and poor connections to the railroad made the efforts difficult.

Between 1909 and 1910, a section of the Central Railroad was finished. When the station was opened, the town was named Majibacoa, but again the American prepotency prevailed and a new board with the name of Omaha appeared overnight - in allusion to a tribe of red skins - the Cubans rejected the interference and after several changes Omaja prevailed.

The 1919 census reveals Omaja's population consisted of 2, 381 inhabitants, it had 13 trades, three hotels, a phone center, a silent cinema, two bakeries, two cemeteries (one for the Cubans and another for the Americans), a Ford agency, two saw-mills, and a shop of cabinetmakers.

In 1920, the political violence between the conservatives and the liberals, and the bank moratorium put an end to the accomplished attempts of neo-colonization. In 1928, with the construction of the Central Highway, Omaja's decadence began to end. This happened because many of its inhabitants moved to Las Parras, Gastón, and Buenaventura in order to be closer to the highway.

== See also ==
- Municipalities of Cuba
- List of cities in Cuba
- Americans in Cuba
- Mir (Calixto García)
