= Vázquez (Puerto Padre) =

- Village
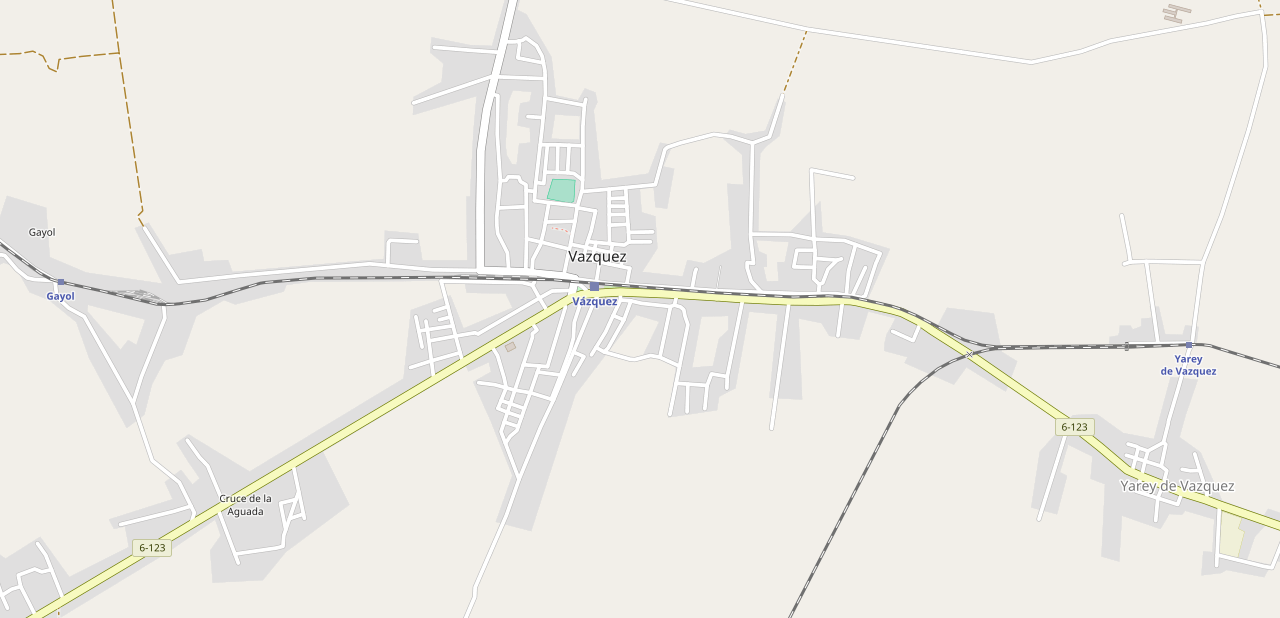
- OSM map showing Vázquez and the surrounding villages

- Location of Vázquez in Cuba
- Coordinates: 21°08′23.5″N 76°43′46.0″W
- Country: Cuba
- Province: Las Tunas
- Municipality: Puerto Padre
- Founded: 1884
- Elevation: 200 m (660 ft)

Population (2011)
  - Total: 13,600
- Time zone: UTC-5 (EST)
- Area code: +53-31

Vázquez is a Cuban village and consejo popular ("people's council", i.e. hamlet) of the municipality of Puerto Padre, in Las Tunas Province. In 2011 it had a population of around 13,600.

== History ==
The village was founded in 1884 and was named after two brothers who built the first finca.

== Geography ==
Located on a plain between Puerto Padre (17 km east); Manatí (43 km northwest) and Las Tunas (32 km southwest), Vázquez is s rural town surrounded by the villages of Yarey de Vázquez, Aguada de Vázquez and Gayol, with whom it forms a small urban area of about 20,000 inhabitants. It is 23 km from Delicias, 31 from Jesús Menéndez and 34 from Calixto.

== Transport ==
The village is served by a railway station on Las Tunas-Puerto Padre line, is crossed in the middle by the highway 6-123 Las Tunas-Puerto Padre, and is 7 km south of the state highway "Circuito Norte" (CN).

== Health ==
The village has a general hospital named "Policlínico Docente 28 de Septiembre", opened in 1989.

== See also ==
- Municipalities of Cuba
- List of cities in Cuba
