= ZMD =

ZMD may refer to:

- Zentralrat der Muslime in Deutschland - Islamic federation in Germany, see Central Council of Muslims in Germany
- ZENworks Management Daemon, an agent application for installing, updating and removing software
- Zentrum Mikroelektronik Dresden, semiconductor manufacturer based in Dresden, 1987 – 2015
- ZMD: Zombies of Mass Destruction (comics), 2008 comic-book series by Kevin Grevioux
- ZMD: Zombies of Mass Destruction (film), 2010 zombie comedy film by Kevin Hamedani
