= ZMD: Zombies of Mass Destruction =

ZMD: Zombies of Mass Destruction may refer to:

- ZMD: Zombies of Mass Destruction (comics), 2008 comic book series by Kevin Grevioux
- ZMD: Zombies of Mass Destruction (film), 2010 zombie comedy film by Kevin Hamedani
