= Miguel Lloyd =

Dominican footballer (born 1982)

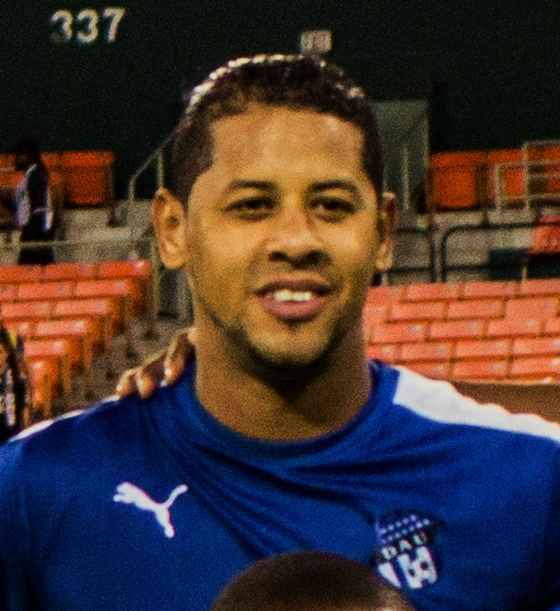
- Lloyd with Árabe Unido in 2015

Personal information
- Full name: Miguel Starling Lloyd Troncoso
- Date of birth: 23 October 1982 (age 44)
- Place of birth: La Romana, Dominican Republic
- Height: 1.80 m (5 ft 11 in)
- Position: Goalkeeper

Team information
- Current team: Cibao
- Number: 1

Senior career*
Years	Team	Apps	(Gls)
2003–2004	San Cristóbal		
2005	Talleres	0	(0)
2005–2006	Racing	0	(0)
2006–2008	Barcelona Atlético	2	(0)
2008–2011	W Connection		
2011–2018	Árabe Unido	251	(0)
2019–	Cibao	152	(0)

International career
2004–	Dominican Republic	53	(0)
- * Club domestic league appearances and goals

Miguel Starling Lloyd Troncoso (born 23 October 1982) is a Dominican professional footballer who plays as a goalkeeper for Cibao FC and the Dominican Republic national team.

== Club career ==
=== San Cristóbal FC ===
He scored a goal playing for San Cristóbal on 21 November 2004.

=== Racing Club ===
In 2005, Lloyd signed with Racing Club de Avellaneda, after a short spell in Talleres de Córdoba.

=== Árabe Unido ===
In 2011, Lloyd signed with C.D. Árabe Unido. He left the club in December 2018.

== Honours ==
Árabe Unido

- Liga Panameña de Fútbol: Apertura 2012, 2015 Clausura, 2015 Apertura

W Connection

- CFU Club Championship: 2009,
- Trinidad and Tobago Goal Shield: 2009,
- Trinidad and Tobago League Cup: 2008

Barcelona Atlético

- Primera División de Republica Dominicana: 2007

Individual

- Liga Panameña de Fútbol 2015 Apertura Best Goalkeeper
- Liga Panameña de Fútbol 2015 Apertura MVP
