= Bawal Na Gamot =

Philippine anti-drug film

- Directed by: Francis "Jun" Posadas
- Written by: Ricardo Lee
- Produced by: Robbie Tan
- Starring: Romnick Sarmenta; Aiko Melendez
- Cinematography: Felizardo Bailen
- Edited by: Ferren Salumbides
- Music by: Willy Garte; Rey Magtoto
- Production company: Seiko Films
- Distributed by: Seiko Films
- Release date: March 27, 1994
- Running time: 100 minutes
- Country: Philippines
- Languages: Filipino; English

Bawal Na Gamot (lit. Forbidden Drugs) is a 1994 Philippine action crime film directed by Francis "Jun" Posadas. The film stars Romnick Sarmenta and Aiko Melendez. The film is named after the hit song of Willy Garte and promotes the anti-drug campaign under Fidel Ramos.

A sequel Bawal Na Gamot 2 was released in 1995.

== Plot ==
=== Bawal na Gamot 1 ===
Brothers Lester and Jimbo come from a well-to-do family that provided for their needs and lavish lifestyle. However, their bond as brothers are put to the test when they and their friends engaged in drugs and subsequently meets the drug syndicate that supplies them. Both brothers got caught in a buy-bust operation and entered the drug rehabilitation upon the insistence of their parents. However, Lester escapes rehabilitation to face the same group of people that had introduced him to drugs which destroyed his relationships with his family and girlfriend.

=== Bawal na Gamot 2 ===
Aiko Melendez and Romnick Sarmenta were the only main cast members that returned from the original film, taking different roles. This time in the movie, it was Aiko's turn to play the drug-dependent Marjorie, while Romnick plays Nanding, a personnel from the rehabilitation center who helps Marjorie recover while tracking down people who caused her drug addiction. Jeffrey Santos, Lito Legaspi and Dick Israel also returned from the first film, taking different roles.

== Cast ==
Main cast

- Romnick Sarmenta as Lester (part 1) / Nanding (part 2)
- Aiko Melendez as Shiela (part 1)/ Marjorie (part 2)
- Gardo Versoza as Jimbo
- Boots Anson-Roa as Lester's mother
- Dante Rivero as Lester's father
- Jess Lapid Jr.
- Jeffrey Santos
- Michael Locsin
- Mikee Villanueva as Leni
- Dick Israel as Tom
- Don Umali
- Ruben Rustia
- Mon Confiado
- Fred Moro
- Evelyn Vargas
- Beverly Salviejo
- Jimmy Reyes

Guest cast

- Ernesto Herrera as himself
- Tito Sotto as himself
- Juan Rodrigo as Tony
- Perla Bautista
- Lito Legaspi
- Willy Garte as himself
- Romeo Asuncion as himself
