= Mir (Calixto García) =

- Village
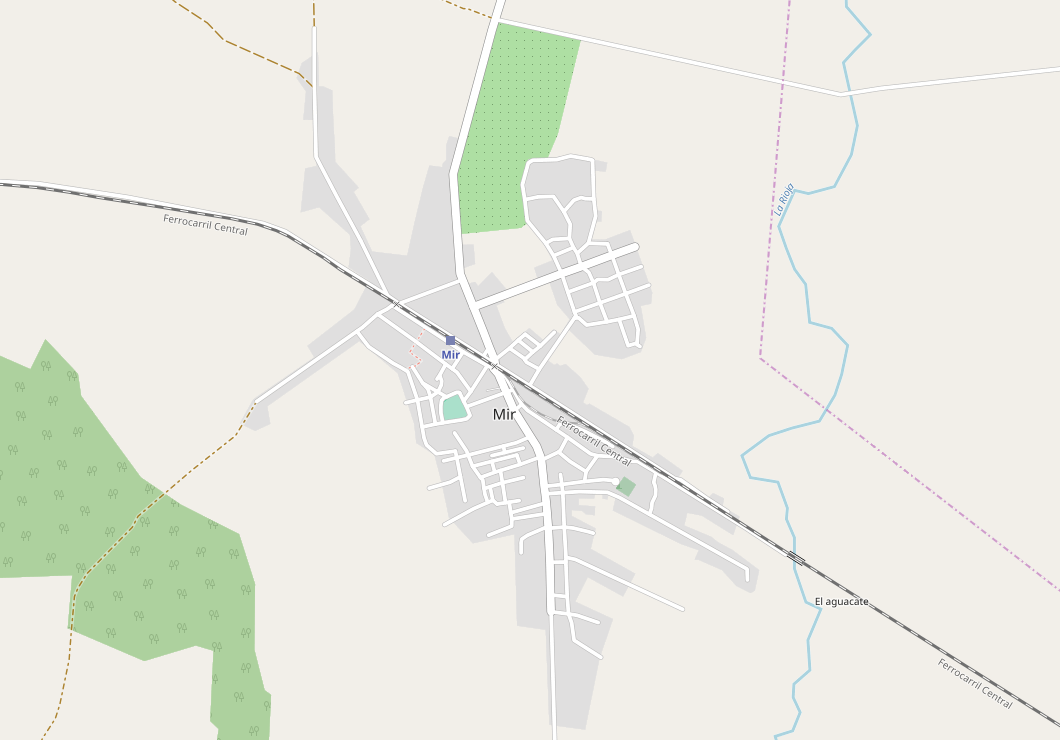
- OSM map showing Mir

- Location of Mir in Cuba
- Coordinates: 20°46′51.7″N 76°38′04.7″W
- Country: Cuba
- Province: Holguín
- Municipality: Calixto García
- Founded: 1902

Area
  - Total: 56 km^{2} (22 sq mi)
- Elevation: 80 m (260 ft)

Population (2011)
  - Total: 6,647
- Time zone: UTC-5 (EST)
- Area code: +53-24

Mir is a Cuban village and consejo popular (ward) of the municipality of Calixto García, in Holguín Province. In 2011 it had a population of 6,647.

== History ==
The village was founded on December 6, 1902, following the construction of the central railway (Ferrocarril Central) Havana-Santiago, that crosses it in the middle. Previously, it was a rural locality named Aguada Ciego de la Rioja.

== Geography ==
Mir spans a plain next to some scattered hills and close to the border with Las Tunas Province. It lies between the cities of Holguín (47 km east), Las Tunas (51 km west) and Bayamo (53 km south); and is 15 km from the town of Buenaventura, the municipal seat of Calixto García.

It is 8 km from Sabanazo, 13 from Omaja, 16 from Maceo, 42 from Cacocum and 43 from Holguín-Frank País Airport.

== Transport ==
The village is served by a railway station on the Havana-Santa Clara-Camagüey-Santiago line, the principal one of the country. It is linked with a provincial road to the "Carretera Central" highway (10 km north); and the planned extension of the A1 motorway, not yet finalized in Holguín Province, should pass close to Mir and Buenaventura.

== See also ==
- Municipalities of Cuba
- List of cities in Cuba
