= Liga Mayor de Fútbol =

Liga Mayor de Fútbol may refer to:

- Liga Mayor de Futbol de Honduras
- Primera División de Republica Dominicana
- Salvadoran Primera División
