= Dairon Blanco =

Dairon Blanco is the name of:

- Dairon Blanco (baseball) (born 1993), Cuban baseball player
- Dairon Blanco (footballer) (1992–2020), Cuban footballer
