= Hansley Martínez =

Dominican footballer

Personal information
- Full name: Hansley Alexander Martínez García
- Date of birth: 3 March 1991 (age 35)
- Place of birth: San Cristóbal, Dominican Republic
- Height: 1.98 m (6 ft 6 in)
- Position: Central defender

Team information
- Current team: Moca
- Number: 18

Youth career
- 2005–2010: San Cristóbal FC

Senior career*
Years	Team	Apps	(Gls)
2011–2014	San Cristóbal FC		
2015	Atlético San Cristóbal		
2016	Club Barcelona Atlético		
2017	Moca		
2018-2019	O&M FC		
2020-2021	Atlético Pantoja	19	(0)
2022	CA San Cristóbal	23	(0)
2025	CA San Cristóbal	8	(0)
2025-2026	Salcedo FC	26	(0)
2026-	O&M FC	3	(0)

International career^{‡}
2010–2021	Dominican Republic	33	(0)
- * Club domestic league appearances and goals as of 26 August 2026 ‡ National team caps and goals as of 30 August 2016

Hansley Alexander Martínez García (born 3 March 1991) is a Dominican footballer who plays as a defender for local club Moca FC and the Dominican Republic national team.

== International career ==
Martínez was part of Dominican Republic campaign at the 2014 FIFA World Cup qualifying process.
