= Heliodoro Díaz =

Cuban baseball player (born 1905)

Heliodoro Diaz
- Pitcher / Catcher
- Born: June 5, 1905; Puerto Padre, Cuba
- Died: January 1989 (aged 83)
- Batted: Right Threw: Right

Negro league baseball debut
- 1920, for the Birmingham Black Barons

Last appearance
- 1934, for the Cuban Stars (East)
- Stats at Baseball Reference

Teams
- Cuban Stars (West) (1922, 1926–1930, 1933); New York Cubans (1935)

Heliodoro "Yoyo" Diaz (June 5, 1905 - January 1989) was a Cuban professional baseball pitcher and catcher in the Negro leagues. He played from 1922 to 1935 with the Cuban Stars (East) and the New York Cubans.
