= Dinardo Rodríguez =

Dominican footballer

Personal information
- Full name: Dinardo Alexis Rodríguez Bueno
- Date of birth: June 8, 1968 (age 58)
- Place of birth: Monte Cristi, Dominican Republic
- Height: 1.80 m (5 ft 11 in)
- Position: Striker

Senior career*
Years	Team	Apps	(Gls)
1987–1989	UASD		
1990–1992	UNPHU		
1991–1993	CA Dominguito		
1994	Rentistas		
1995–1999	Moca		
2000	Pantoja		
2001	CA Dominguito		
2002	Pantoja		

International career
1989–2001	Dominican Republic	15	(11)
- * Club domestic league appearances and goals

Dinardo Alexis Rodríguez Bueno (born 8 June 1968) is a Dominican retired football striker, who was the scorer of the first ever Dominican goal in World Cup qualification.

== Club career ==
Born in Monte Cristi, Rodríguez moved to Santo Domingo aged 12 where he joined Club Atlético Dominguito. He later became the first Dominican footballer to play professionally when he signed for Uruguayan side Rentistas in 1994 and subsequently became the nation's first professional goalscorer.

== International career ==
Nicknamed Lalo, he made his debut for the Dominican Republic in 1989 and earned 15 caps, scoring 11 goals. His final match was a March 2001 Caribbean Cup match against St Kitts.

== Administration ==
In 2019, Rodríguez became executive director of the professional LDF.

== Honours ==
- Universidad Autónoma de Santo Domingo
  - Primera División de Republica Dominicana: 1989
- Moca
  - Primera División de Republica Dominicana: 1995, 1999
- Atlético Pantoja
  - Primera División de Republica Dominicana: 2000
