= Puerto Padre =

- Municipality
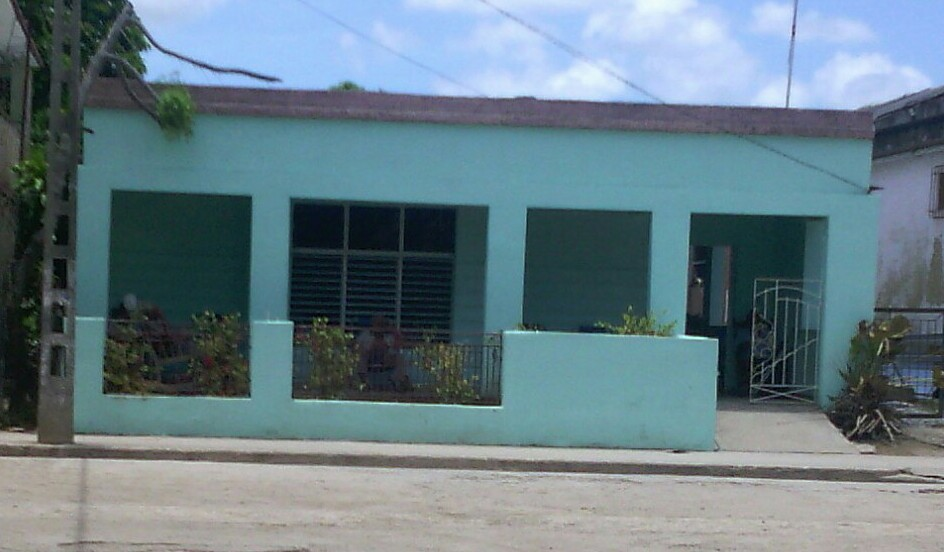
- Hogar in Vázquez
- Nicknames: City of Mills, La Villa Azul de Cuba (Cuba's Blue City)
- Motto: Praesto Pro Patria
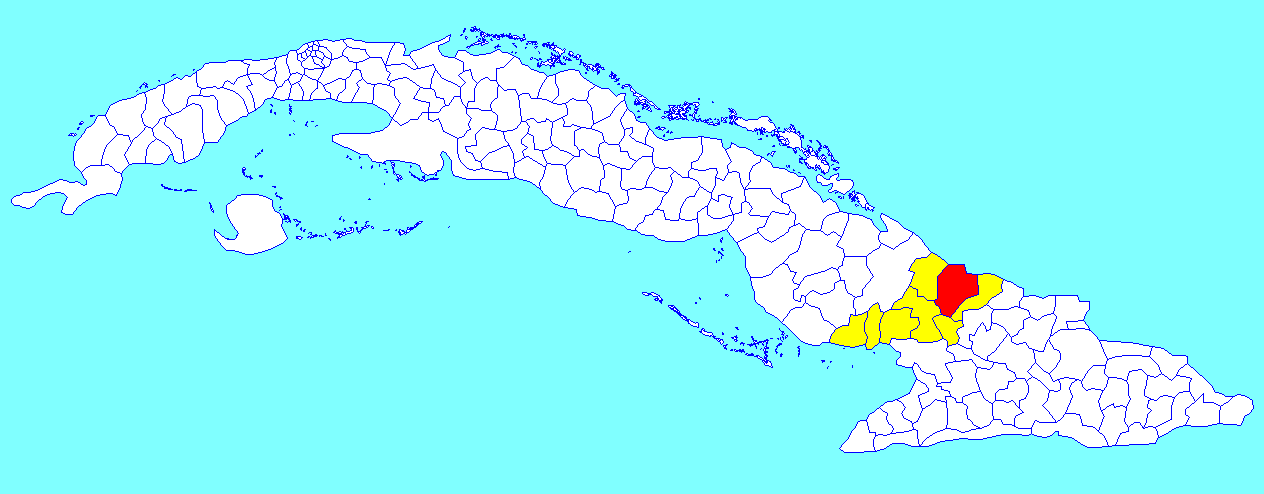
- Puerto Padre municipality (red) within Las Tunas Province (yellow) and Cuba
- Coordinates: 21°11′42″N 76°36′6″W
- Country: Cuba
- Province: Las Tunas
- Established: 1541 (1861 as a city)

Area
  - Total: 1,178 km^{2} (455 sq mi)
- Elevation: 25 m (82 ft)

Population (2022)
  - Total: 90,218
  - Density: 76.59/km^{2} (198.4/sq mi)
- Time zone: UTC-5 (EST)
- Area code: +53-31
- Website: https://www.portuspatris.gob.cu/es/

Puerto Padre (Spanish pronunciation: [ˈpweɾto paðɾe]) is a municipality and town in the Las Tunas Province of Cuba. It is located on the northern coastal region of the province, in an estuary (Estero El Españolito) that opens into the Puerto Padre Bay.

== History ==
Known popularly as the City of Mills, Puerto Padre has a history dating back into the 16th century. In the mid-19th century (1851), the city began its transformation from a small town into an industrial centre with the construction of its first sugarcane mill. The town played a large role in Cuba's wars of independence, and today is something of a tourist centre. The founders were Criollo (Creole) landowners of Castilian ancestry and Catalan merchants.

=== Columbus' arrival point theory ===
During the 2nd half of the 20th century a group of archaeologists brought forward a theory which disputes the current version of Columbus' landfall site. They claim that Puerto Padre bay was indeed the first spot in which Columbus landed in Cuba. The commonly accepted site is Bariay bay which is located further east in the province of Holguín. There are several sites which are disputed of being the first landing spot of Columbus and his crew: Puerto Padre and Manatí, both in the province of Las Tunas; and Gibara and Bariay in the province of Holguín).

== Geography ==
=== Overview ===
The city is located at the bottom corner of the bay which bears the same name. At least two rivers lead into Puerto Padre Bay. The small islet of Cayo Juan Claro is located towards the eastern center side of the bay, the Puerto Carupano port is located in this islet which is connected to the mainland by a man-made road, a railroad connects the islet with the now defunct sugar factory in the nearby town of Delicias. The terrain is mainly formed of flat-land although the city itself seats on a small hill which rolls nicely into the sea. The immediate terrain nearby the town is swampy with a thick mangrove forest.

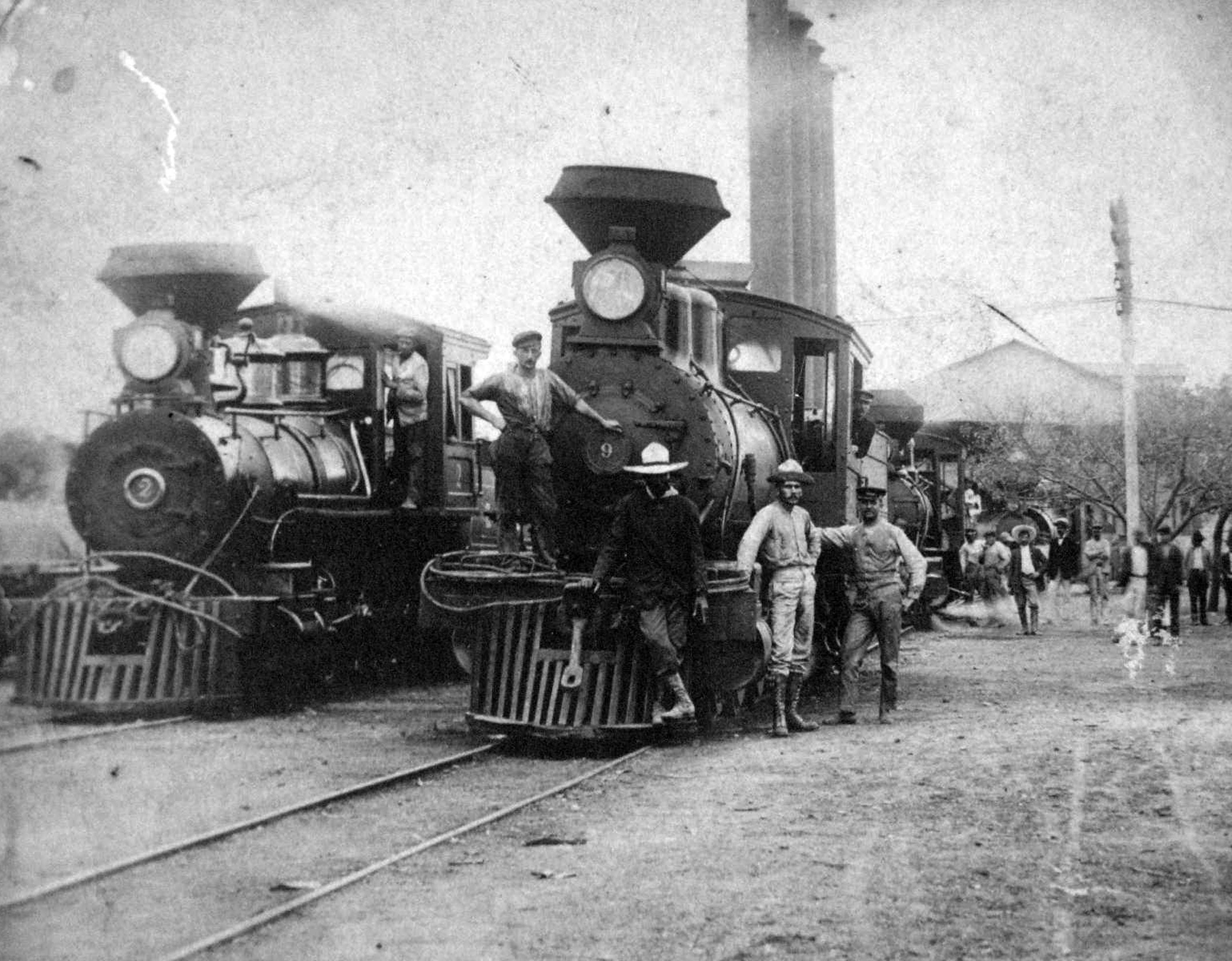
Chaparra narrow gauge railway station

Prior to the 1959 revolution, the municipality was divided into the barrios of Chaparra, Delicias, Estrada Palma, La Lima, La Yaya, Los Alfonsos, Maniabón, Norte, San Manuel, Santa María, Sur, Vázquez, Vedado and Yarey. These toponyms are still in use today though the pre-1959 municipality's borders no longer include Delicias (Antonio Guiteras) or Chaparra (Jesús Menéndez), named for their respective sugar mills, which as of 2012 are no longer operational.

=== Climate ===
This area typically has a pronounced dry season. According to the Köppen Climate Classification system, Puerto Padre has a tropical savanna climate, abbreviated "Aw" on climate maps.

== Demographics ==
In 2022, the municipality of Puerto Padre had a population of 90,218. With a total area of 1,178 km^{2} (455 sq mi), it has a population density of 77/km^{2} (200/sq mi).

== Tourism ==
The town is known for its charming streets, bay views and hilltop fortress. Crystal clear water and white sandy beaches can be found at the entrance to the Puerto Padre Bay. These beaches are popular with locals and visitors alike, their names are: El Rail, La Boca and La Llanita. Tourist facilities are available at nearby beach resort located in Covarrubias beach, which is within the municipality of Puerto Padre.

== Monuments and buildings of interest ==
- Castillo de Salcedo or Fuerte de la Loma: A hilltop fortress (ca.1869-1879). National Monument since 1981.
- Parroquia S. José (Roman Catholic church 1892 )
- Iglesia de Los Amigos (Quaker church ca. 1903)
- El Liceo, present site of the city's museum, built in 1929
- Parque José Martí (commonly called "de los Vagos" and "La Piquera" )
- Parque Antonio Maceo (formerly Independencia)
- Municipal Cemetery, which contains mausoleums and sculptures
- Estatua de la Libertad. Statue dedicated to Liberty (1904)
- Busto de las Madres. A monument dedicated to all mothers. (1946)
- Estatua de Máximo Gómez. A bronze statue dedicated to a general of the Independence War. (1959)
- Mural sculpture "Canto a la Revolución" by Mexican sculptor Electa Arenal Huerta, carved on the façade of the pediatric hospital in 1962
- Sculpture group of Don Quixote and the Wind Mill (1989)

== Personalities ==
- Teófilo Stevenson (1952 - 2012), Olympic gold medalist boxer
- Yoyo Díaz (1905 - 1989), baseball player
- Enrique Peña Sánchez (1880 - 1922), musician
- Juan Pablo Torres Morell (1946 - 2005), Latin-Jazz Trombonist and composer
- Emiliano Salvador Jr. (1951 - 1992), Latin-Jazz pianist and composer
- José Chacón Bermudez (1889 - 1974), Poet and Journalist, author of Rosas y Laureles, the first book which was published and printed in the city in 1915
- Juan Carlos Perez Rondon (b.1969), Olympic gold medalist baseball player

== See also ==
- Municipalities of Cuba
- List of cities in Cuba
