= Wellington Agramonte =

Dominican Republic footballer (born 1987)

Personal information
- Full name: Wellington Agramonte de los Santos
- Date of birth: 12 February 1987 (age 39)
- Place of birth: San Cristóbal, Dominican Republic
- Height: 1.95 m (6 ft 5 in)
- Position: Goalkeeper

Team information
- Current team: O&M FC

Youth career
- San Cristóbal FC

Senior career*
Years	Team	Apps	(Gls)
2007–2011	San Cristóbal FC		
2012–2013	Club Deportivo Pantoja		
2013	Aigle Noir AC		
2014	San Cristóbal FC		
2014	Jennings Grenades FC		
2015–2016	Cibao FC		
2017–	O&M FC		

International career^{‡}
2011–	Dominican Republic	13	(0)
- * Club domestic league appearances and goals ‡ National team caps and goals as of 10 October 2014

Wellington Agramonte de los Santos (born 12 February 1987) is a Dominican footballer who plays as a goalkeeper for local club O&M FC and the Dominican Republic. His date of birth is also listed as 12 February 1989.

Agramonte represented the Dominican Republic in 2014 World Cup qualifiers, beginning with the preliminary match against the Cayman Islands on 11 November 2011.

== External sources ==
- Wellington Agramonte at National-Football-Teams.com
