= Gary Marigard =

French Guianan footballer (born 1988)

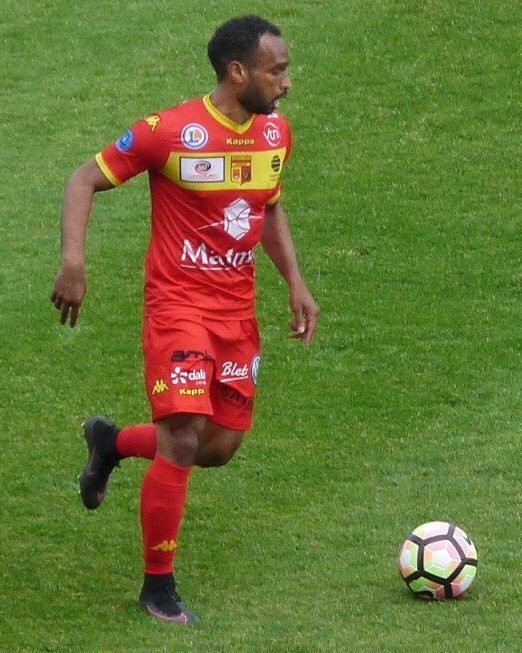

Personal information
- Full name: Gary Gérard Marigard
- Date of birth: 6 January 1988 (age 38)
- Place of birth: Cayenne, French Guiana
- Height: 1.75 m (5 ft 9 in)
- Position: Right back

Team information
- Current team: Croix

Youth career
- 2006–2007: Angers

Senior career*
Years	Team	Apps	(Gls)
2007–2013	Wasquehal	41	(1)
2012–2015	Croix	58	(1)
2015–2019	Quevilly-Rouen	58	(0)
2017–2019	Quevilly-Rouen II	24	(1)
2019–	Croix	0	(0)

International career^{‡}
2012–	French Guiana	14	(0)
- * Club domestic league appearances and goals as of 22:25, 6 February 2019 (UTC) ‡ National team caps and goals as of 10 March 2018

Gary Gérard Marigard (born 6 January 1988) is a French Guianan footballer who currently plays as a right back. He plays for Croix in the French Championnat National 1.

== Professional career ==
After solid seasons in the lower French leagues with ES Wasquehal, and Iris Club de Croix, Marigard moved to US Quevilly-Rouen to help them get promoted to the Championnat National. He successfully helped his team get promoted, and in cup faced both his former clubs. Marigard made his professional debut for Quevilly in a 1–0 Coupe de la Ligue loss to US Orléans on 8 August 2017.

In July 2019, he returned to Croix.

== International career ==
Marigard made his debut for the French Guiana national football team in a 4–1 2013 Gold Cup qualifying loss to Trinidad and Tobago on 10 October 2012.
