= Ronald Elusma =

Haitian footballer (born 1993)

Personal information
- Full name: Ronald Elusma
- Date of birth: September 8, 1993 (age 33)
- Place of birth: Petite Rivière de l'Artibonite, Haiti
- Position: Goalkeeper

Team information
- Current team: America des Cayes

Senior career*
Years	Team	Apps	(Gls)
2011–2014	Victory SC	3	(0)
2014–	America des Cayes		

International career
2014 –	Haiti	3	(0)
- * Club domestic league appearances and goals as of 1 July 2015

Ronald Elusma (born 8 September 1993, in Petite Rivière de l'Artibonite, Haiti) is a Haitian footballer who plays for America des Cayes.

== Career ==
Elusma played for Victory SC since 2011 , and was transferred July 2015 to America des Cayes. He was selected by the Haiti national football team to play for the 2015 CONCACAF Gold Cup.
