= Calixto García, Cuba =

Calixto García
- Municipality
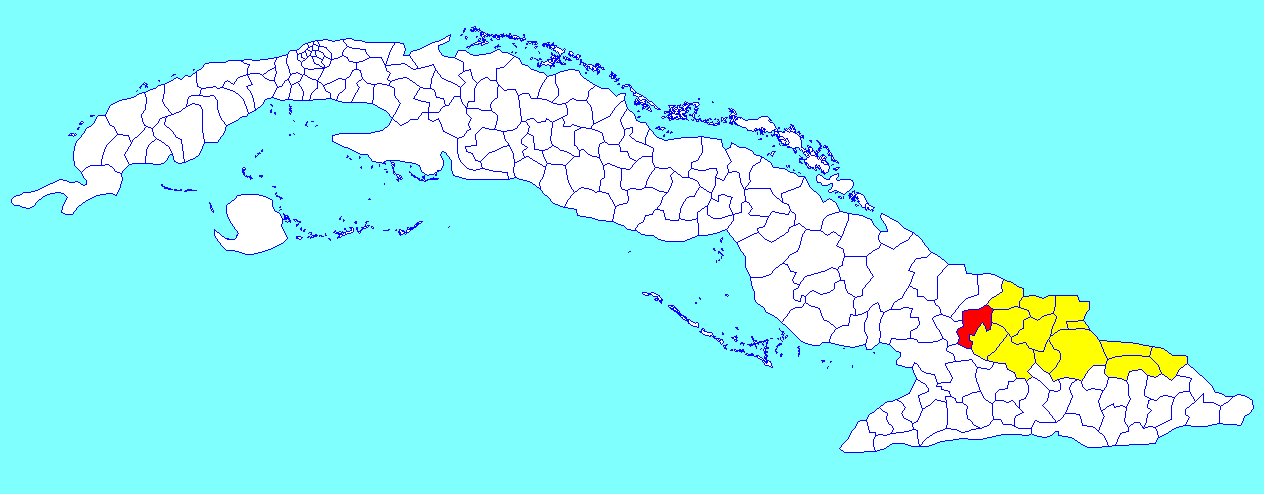
- Calixto García municipality (red) within Holguín Province (yellow) and Cuba
- Coordinates: 20°51′14″N 76°36′7″W
- Country: Cuba
- Province: Holguín
- Seat: Buenaventura

Area
  - Total: 617 km^{2} (238 sq mi)
- Elevation: 85 m (279 ft)

Population (2022)
  - Total: 53,141
  - Density: 86.1/km^{2} (223/sq mi)
- Time zone: UTC-5 (EST)
- Area code: +53-24

Calixto García (Spanish pronunciation: [kaˈliɣsto ɣaɾˈsi.a]) is a municipality in eastern Cuba, in the province of Holguín. It has a population of 53,722 inhabitants. Its activities are centered around agriculture (fruits and root vegetables) and cattle farming focused on beef production. Buenaventura is the capital of the Calixto García Municipality. The municipality was named for Calixto García Iñiguez, a hero of the War of Independence.

== Geography ==
The municipality includes the town of Buenaventura (municipal seat), the villages of Las Calabazas, Mir, Sabanazo, San Agustín, and other minor localities. The area generally features flat topography in the south, while the north intersperses small, significant elevations such as Bartola, Salsipuedes, and La Plata, creating a beautiful landscape. The land use is primarily non-sugarcane agriculture, mainly livestock and diverse crops, with smaller areas of citrus and forest plantations.

== History ==
This area has a history closely linked to the origins of Cuban nationality. Early on, local Creole communities developed, leading over the centuries to land exploitation primarily in livestock and small crop plots using primitive methods until, after the Spanish occupation, a production system utilizing slave labor was established.

=== Ten Years' War ===
When the Ten Years' War broke out, the insurrection immediately found support in the area. Luis Figueredo led a group of men to arms in the Mijial area. Forces under the command of Calixto García Iñiguez fought battles on September 22, 1873, against Fort Martillo, joined by generals such as Flor Crombet, Leyte-Vidal, Guillermo Moncada, and Ricardo de Céspedes. On July 14, 1877, in a place called Itabo, generals Máximo Gómez and Antonio Maceo met to organize the Holguín campaign.

=== Little War ===
On August 24, 1879, in San Lorenzo de la Rioja, a group of rebels led by General Belisario Grave de Peralta rose in arms, initiating the Little War. This campaign, however, like the Ten Years' War, would end in failure, and for the next few decades Spain continued to govern the island.

=== War of Independence ===
On February 24, 1895, the clarion call for war for Cuba's freedom was heard again. The Catalan José Miró Argenter, along with Diego Carballo Hidalgo and Pablo García, gathered the first troops, staging the Mala Noche Uprising.

This prefecture was a convergence point for the Mambisa Forces, and here the invading column of Antonio Maceo was awaited by Holguin forces with 350 horsemen led by General Luis de Ferias, who definitively organized the general staff. José Miró Argenter was appointed head. On July 1, 1896, Calixto García held and won the battle of Los Moscones. The war ended, but full freedom was not achieved due to American intervention in which Cuba would become a republic serving American interests following the passage of documents such as the Platt Amendment.

=== Cuban Revolution ===
In 1956, the first cell of the July 26 Movement was established in Mir, made up of revolutionaries noted for their actions in propaganda and sabotage in support of the guerrilla movement; one of its members, Carlos Borja Garcés, was part of the group that executed the tyranny's hitman Fermín Cawler Gallegos in Holguín.

Platoon one of Column no. 14 operated between Buenaventura and Holguín under the command of fighter Oscar Orozco Viltres, with Arsenio García Dávila as second, an expeditionary of the Granma. They later participated in the combat at the entrance against the troops of Sosa Blanco along with platoon number 3 from the same column, inflicting numerous casualties on the enemy.

On March 31, 1958, revolutionary forces in the area led by Orlando Lara took the Mir barracks, the first town taken in the plains of the East.

On December 16, the Microonda de la Loma de las Mantecas was taken. On the 31st of the same month, the Buenaventura barracks fell to the rebel troops.

Before the triumph of the Cuban Revolution, the territory that today occupies Calixto García, about 50 percent of it was part of the Yareyal municipality, mainly the southern portion while a part of the north belonged to the Puerto Padre-Chaparra municipality; further east of Holguín.

=== Postwar ===
Upon the triumph of the Revolution, the municipality was constituted with just over 25,000 inhabitants under the name Mir-Buenaventura. The first political and mass organizations were headquartered in the town of Mir and within the structure in 1963 for political work, four districts were created. At the end of '64 and the beginning of '65, a governmental direction was constituted under the name of local power; its direction chose Buenaventura as its headquarters, as well as other emerging towns that were incorporated into this town as headquarters, including the Party and ANAP. The Youth Communist League, Pioneers Union of Cuba, and other economic organizations moved in 1966; the CDR and FMC organizations were also transferred.

In the same year, the municipality was recognized with the names inverted: Buenaventura-Mir. In 1976, with the creation of the OACE on October 10, 1976, which coincidentally was constituted, the government was recognized as a popular power, following the experience taken from the province of Matanzas and by agreement of the politburo.

With the annexation of part of San Andrés, the municipality takes the name of Calixto García, with a territorial extension of 616.97 km2 and a population of just over 53,000 inhabitants.

== Demographics ==
In 2004, the municipality of Calixto Garcia had a population of 53,141. With a total area of 617 km^{2} (238 sq mi), it has a population density of 86/km^{2} (220/sq mi).

== Hydrography ==
The largest and longest river is the Río La Rioja, which became tragically famous during Hurricane Flora, when its floods caused destruction in the area. Places of hydrographic interest are the source of the Río Chaparra in the municipality and other smaller, some intermittent, rivers and streams.

== See also ==
- List of cities in Cuba
- Municipalities of Cuba
