= Jacomeno Barrett =

Jamaican international footballer (born 1984)

Personal information
- Date of birth: 3 December 1984 (age 41)
- Height: 1.94 m (6 ft 4 1/2 in)
- Position: Goalkeeper

Team information
- Current team: Montego Bay United

Senior career*
Years	Team	Apps	(Gls)
2007–2008	Joe Public		
2010–2011	Sporting Central Academy		
2011–	Montego Bay United		

International career^{‡}
2012–	Jamaica	5	(0)
- * Club domestic league appearances and goals as of 27 February 2012 ‡ National team caps and goals as of 9 June 2015

Jacomeno Barrett (born 3 December 1984) is a Jamaican international footballer who plays for Montego Bay United, as a goalkeeper.

== Career ==
Barrett has played club football for Joe Public, Sporting Central Academy and Montego Bay United.

=== International ===
He made his international debut for Jamaica in February 2012 against the Cuba national football team.
