= Jimmy Reyes =

Dominican footballer

Personal information
- Full name: Jimmy Reyes Bautista
- Date of birth: 10 June 1983 (age 43)
- Place of birth: San Cristóbal, Dominican Republic
- Height: 1.70 m (5 ft 7 in)
- Position: Midfielder

Team information
- Current team: Universidad O&M F.C.

Senior career*
Years	Team	Apps	(Gls)
2011–2013	Deportivo Pantoja		
2014	San Cristóbal FC		
2015	Atlético San Cristóbal		
2015–16	Atlético Pantoja		
2017–	O&M F.C.		

International career^{‡}
2008–	Dominican Republic	8	(0)
- * Club domestic league appearances and goals ‡ National team caps and goals as of 23 March 2013

Jimmy Reyes Bautista (born 10 June 1983) is a Dominican footballer who plays as a midfielder for Universidad O&M F.C. in the Liga Dominicana de Fútbol.

== Career statistics ==
=== International ===
As of match played 23 March 2013.

National team	Year	Apps	Goals
Dominican Republic
Dominican Republic	2008	1	0
Dominican Republic	2011	2	0
Dominican Republic	2012	4	0
Dominican Republic	2013	1	0
Total		8	0
