= Steven Lecefel =

French footballer (born 1986)

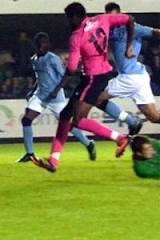
- Steven Lecefel playing for Rhyl in 2013

Personal information
- Full name: Steven Loic Lecefel
- Date of birth: 16 April 1986 (age 40)
- Place of birth: Trappes, France
- Height: 1.88 m (6 ft 2 in)
- Position: Forward

Youth career
- 1991–2002: Guyancourt

Senior career*
Years	Team	Apps	(Gls)
2005–2009	Guyancourt		
2009–2011	Garenne-Colombes		
2012	Barnet	0	(0)
2012	Hyde United		
2012–2013	Rhyl FC		
2013–2014	RC Rivière-Pilote		
2014–2015	Città di Messina		
2016–2017	Franconville		
2017	Acireale		(16)
2017	Sancataldese	1	(0)
2017–2018	FC Chartres		
2018–	Team Wellington	0	(0)

International career
2012–2013	Martinique	5	(2)
- * Club domestic league appearances and goals as of 1 November 2018

Steven Loic Lecefel (born 16 April 1986) is a Martinican international footballer who currently plays as a forward for Team Wellington in the ISPS Handa Premiership.

== Career ==
=== First years ===
During his youth, Steven Lecefel played for the Guyancourt in Yvelines, France. He then played for two years with La Garenne-Colombes in the French seventh tier.

=== Club play ===
In 2011, Lecefel left Paris for Barnet in London, who play in the English League Two, but he only stayed a few months after Lawrie Sanchez decided not to sign him. Lecefel then went to Hyde United where he was spotted by Rhyl FC manager Greg Strong signing for the club following their relegation to the second tier of the Welsh football league due to financial problems. With Rhyl, Lecefel helped the team earn promotion back to the Welsh Premier League, and got called up to the Martinique national football team.

=== International play ===
In December 2012, Lecefel was called up to play for the Martinique national football team, being eligible through his father's ancestry. Lecefel played in the Caribbean Cup and helped the team qualify for the CONCACAF Gold Cup. He played five games and scored two goals.
