= Amancio, Cuba =

Amancio
- Municipality
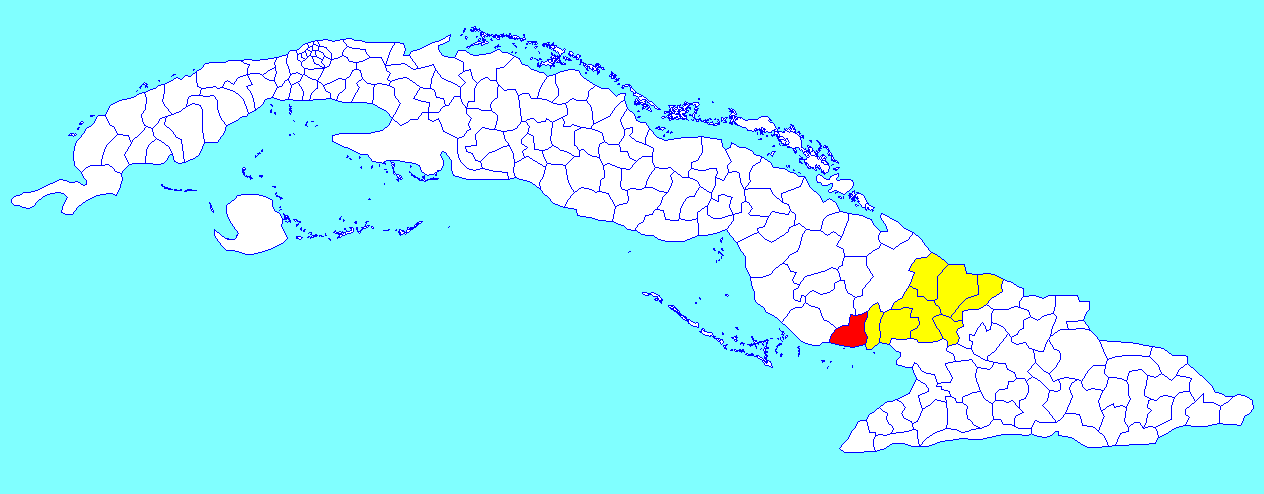
- Amancio municipality (red) within Las Tunas Province (yellow) and Cuba
- Coordinates: 20°49′11″N 77°35′4″W
- Country: Cuba
- Province: Las Tunas

Area
  - Total: 857 km^{2} (331 sq mi)
- Elevation: 35 m (115 ft)

Population (2022)
  - Total: 36,132
  - Density: 42.2/km^{2} (109/sq mi)
- Time zone: UTC-5 (EST)
- Area code: +53-31
- Website: https://www.amancio.gob.cu/

Amancio (Spanish pronunciation: [aˈmansjo]) is a municipality and town in the Las Tunas Province of Cuba. It is located in the south-western part of the province, and opens to the Gulf of Guacanayabo to the south.

== Demographics ==
In 2022, Amancio had a population of 36,132. With a total area of 857 km^{2} (331 sq mi), it has a population density of 48.5/km^{2} (126/sq mi).

== Notable people ==
- Salvador Valdés Mesa (born 1945), Cuban former trade union leader, politician and current Vice President of Cuba

== See also ==
- Municipalities of Cuba
- List of cities in Cuba
