= Majibacoa =

- Municipality
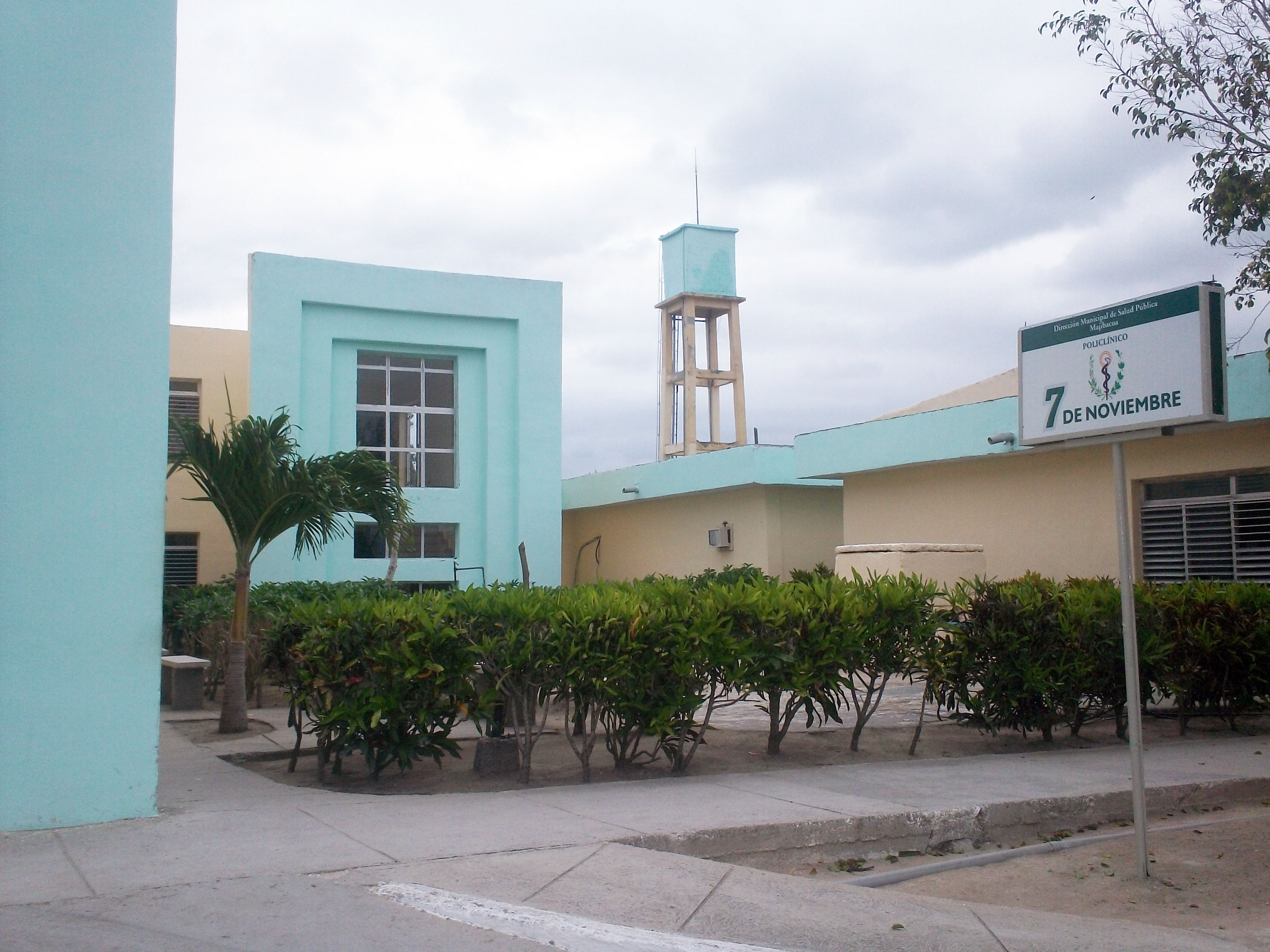

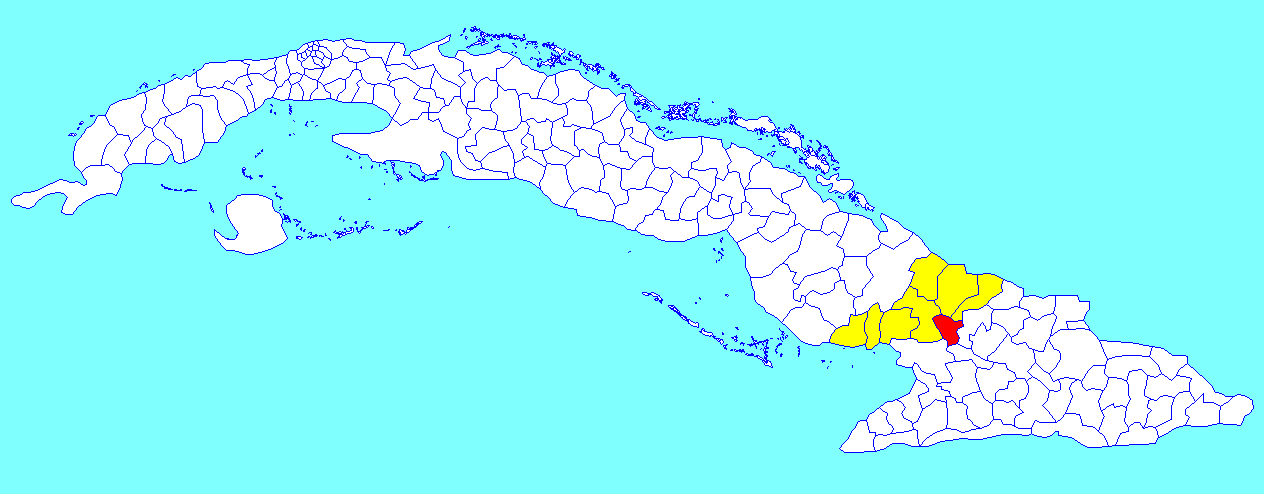
- Majibacoa municipality (red) within Las Tunas Province (yellow) and Cuba
- Coordinates: 20°55′2″N 76°52′35″W
- Country: Cuba
- Province: Las Tunas
- Seat: Calixto

Area
  - Total: 621 km^{2} (240 sq mi)
- Elevation: 85 m (279 ft)

Population (2022)
  - Total: 40,235
  - Density: 64.8/km^{2} (168/sq mi)
- Time zone: UTC-5 (EST)
- Area code: +53-31
- Website: https://www.majibacoa.gob.cu/es/

Majibacoa is a municipality and town in the Las Tunas Province of Cuba. The municipal seat is located in the town of Calixto, immediately east of Las Tunas, the provincial capital.

== Demographics ==
In 2022, the municipality of Majibacoa had a population of 40,235. With a total area of 621 km^{2} (240 sq mi), it has a population density of 65/km^{2} (170/sq mi).

== See also ==
- Omaja
- Municipalities of Cuba
- List of cities in Cuba
