= Luke Blakely =

English–Antiguan footballer

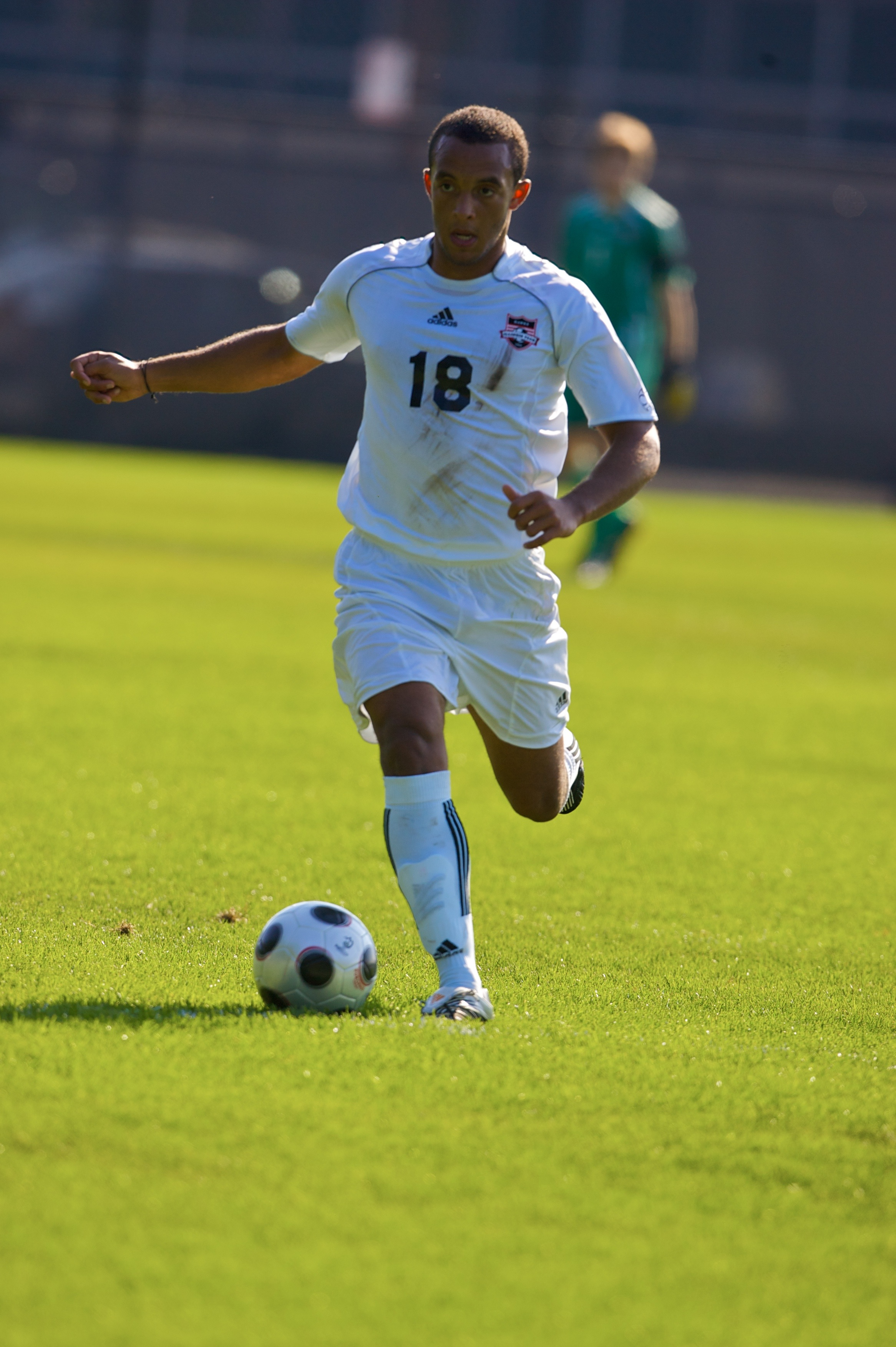

Personal information
- Full name: Luke George-Blakely
- Date of birth: 13 July 1988 (age 38)
- Place of birth: Leicester, England
- Height: 1.80 m (5 ft 11 in)
- Positions: Defender; midfielder

Youth career
- 2007: Marshalltown Tigers
- 2008–2010: Illinois Tech Scarlet Hawks

Senior career*
Years	Team	Apps	(Gls)
2010	Chicago Fire NPSL		
2012–2013	Antigua Barracuda FC	21	(0)
2013	Barwell	2	(1)
2013–2014	Stamford		
2014	Loughborough Dynamo		

International career^{‡}
2012	Antigua and Barbuda	7	(0)
- * Club domestic league appearances and goals as of 22:00, 9 January 2020 (UTC) ‡ National team caps and goals as of 22:00, 9 January 2020 (UTC)

Luke George-Blakely (born 13 July 1988) is an English-born Antiguan international footballer who played for Antigua Barracuda FC in the USL Professional Division. Blakely started his youth career playing for Highfield Rangers in his hometown of Leicester, England. In 2007, he relocated to the U.S. to play college soccer for Marshalltown Community College in the NJCAA.

== Career ==
=== College and amateur ===
Blakely played the 2007 season with Marshalltown Community College where he helped MCC win the Iowa Conference and finish 3rd in the NJCAA national tournament. Blakely was awarded an honorable mention in the 2007 Iowa Regional team. Blakely transferred to Illinois Institute of Technology of the NAIA for the 2008 season where he helped IIT win two CCAC Conference Championships in 2008 and 2010. While captaining the side for his junior and senior year, Blakely was CCAC All-Conference honorable mention in 2008 and CCAC first team all-Conference in 2010.

During his college years Blakely also played for the Chicago Fire Premier in the National Premier Soccer League and Chicago Fire Premier U23 in the United States Adult Soccer Association. In 2010 Blakely helped the Chicago Fire Premier U23 to a national championship.

=== Professional ===
Blakely signed with USL Professional Division club Antigua Barracuda FC in March 2012. He made his professional debut on 6, April 2012 in the Barracudas season opening game against the Pittsburgh Riverhounds.

== International career ==
Blakely received his first call up to the Antigua and Barbuda national football team in March 2012 and was included in the squad for a friendly against St Kitts. Blakely received his first cap on 12, March 2012 when he started in the 1–0 defeat against St Kitts. On 30, March 2012 Blakely received his second cap when he started for Antigua against St Vincent. Blakely was starting defensive midfielder in the Antigua and Barbuda World Cup Qualifiers squad that is competed in a group with USA, Jamaica and Guatemala.
