= José Miguel Granadino =

Salvadoran footballer (born 1988)

Personal information
- Full name: José Miguel Granadino León
- Date of birth: 28 September 1988 (age 38)
- Place of birth: Santa Ana, El Salvador
- Height: 1.80 m (5 ft 11 in)
- Position: Defender

Youth career
- 2001–2005: Cuscachapa

Senior career*
Years	Team	Apps	(Gls)
2005	FAS reserves		
2006–2013	FAS		

International career
- El Salvador U23
2013	El Salvador	6	(0)
- * Club domestic league appearances and goals

José Miguel Granadino León (born 28 September 1988) is a Salvadoran former footballer who played as a defender.

== Club career ==
Granadino played his entire career for FAS.

=== Lifeban for match-fixing ===
On 20 September 2013, José Miguel Granadino and 13 other players of El Salvador were banned for life. The players were accused of receiving bribes in matches such as a 5–0 defeat against Mexico in 2011 and a 4–2 loss against Paraguay in February 2013.
