= Dairon Blanco (footballer) =

Cuban footballer (1992–2020)

Personal information
- Full name: Dairon Alberto Blanco Joseph
- Date of birth: 2 October 1992
- Place of birth: Amancio, Cuba
- Date of death: 16 November 2020 (aged 28)
- Place of death: Cienfuegos, Cuba
- Height: 1.70 m (5 ft 7 in)
- Position: Midfielder

Senior career*
Years	Team	Apps	(Gls)
2009–2018	Las Tunas		
2019	Canelones del Este		

International career
2012–2016	Cuba	7	(0)
- * Club domestic league appearances and goals

Dairon Alberto Blanco Joseph (2 October 1992 – 16 November 2020) was a Cuban footballer who played as a midfielder.

== Career ==
Born in Amancio, Blanco played club football for Las Tunas and in Uruguay for Canelones del Este.

He was a member of the Cuba national team between 2012 and 2016, earning 7 caps.

== Death ==
Blanco died on 16 November 2020, aged 28, in a car accident in Cienfuegos.
