= ZMD: Zombies of Mass Destruction (film) =

- Official theatrical poster
- Directed by: Kevin Hamedani
- Written by: Kevin Hamedani; Ramon Isao
- Produced by: John Sinno
- Starring: Janette Armand; Doug Fahl; Cooper Hopkins
- Cinematography: John Guleserian
- Edited by: Andrew McAllister
- Music by: Andrew Rohrmann
- Release date: January 29, 2010 (After Dark Horrorfest)
- Running time: 89 minutes
- Country: United States
- Language: English
- Budget: $1 million

ZMD: Zombies of Mass Destruction is a 2010 zombie comedy film directed by Kevin Hamedani and starring Janette Armand, Doug Fahl and Cooper Hopkins. It also featured the film debut of Sydney Sweeney.

== Plot ==
On a beach in the peninsula town of Port Gamble, a blind resident discovers a rotting zombie washed up in the sand that wakes up. On September 25, 2003, Iranian-American girl Frida Abbas returned to Port Gamble, her hometown, after dropping out of Princeton University. At a gas station, she runs into her neighbor Joe Miller, his wife Judy, and their teenage son Brian.

Frida eventually arrives at her house and finds her dad, Ali, praying. Frida sneaks out of the house with her boyfriend, Derek.

Meanwhile, a couple, Tom Hunt and Lance Murphy, arrive in Port Gamble to tell Tom's mother that he is gay. While the three have dinner, Tom's mom reveals that she was bitten earlier by a bystander at the store. Tom's mom goes into the kitchen to prepare dessert, and Tom admits that he is gay, while she becomes a zombie and tries to attack Lance. The TV news claims, without any real evidence, that Port Gamble is experiencing a bio-terrorism attack that turns its victims into zombies.

While Frida and Derek are outside, Derek's face is ripped off and eaten by a zombie. Ali leaves the house to look for Frida, who escapes from zombies and returns to her abandoned, surrounded house, where she runs into Judy, Brian, and Joe. Frida and Judy hide in the basement with Brian and Joe; Judy is bitten by a zombie while helping Frida inside. Joe sees that a terrorist claiming responsibility for the outbreak is wearing the same necklace as Frida. He ties Frida to a chair and asks her questions about U.S. history.

Tom and Lance find Mrs. Banks. They run into a church where Reverend Haggis, Mayor Burton, Larry, a married couple, a senior woman, and another churchgoer are playing bingo. They begin to board the windows.

In the basement, Joe nails Frida's foot to the ground and threatens her with a blow torch when Brian smashes a hole in his father's head with a hammer. Brian lifts the nail out of Frida's foot just before being attacked and eaten by the zombified Judy.

As Burton starts to show signs of infection, Mrs. Banks suggests quarantining him in a room. This causes Burton to rebel against her. Tom and Lance lecture Burton, which makes Haggis decide to turn Lance and Tom into straights by drugging them and making them watch gay "erotic" films. Larry and the married couple go downstairs to assist Haggis in the process, locking themselves in the basement. Burton reanimates into a zombie and bites the senior woman's jaw off, leaving Mrs. Banks alone with the zombie. As Lance is being drugged, Tom threatens the group with Larry's gun and forces them to let Mrs. Banks in. Burton enters with her. Larry and the couple run out of the church with Tom, Lance, and Mrs. Banks following. Haggis attempts to talk to Burton but is beaten half to death using his own torn-off arm.

Frida makes it home to Ali, who turns into a zombie, and she is forced to kill him. She prepares to commit suicide with Ali's shotgun, but hears a helicopter. She runs out of the house into a playground full of zombies and the still-living Joe. In a struggle, Joe tries to handcuff Frida to a slide, but Frida breaks loose from his grip, handcuffs him to the slide, and runs off. Joe cries that he is sorry and that he was stupid. Frida forgives him but refuses to release him. The zombies devour Joe. Frida soon finds Tom, Lance, and Mrs. Banks and saves them from a zombie. They leave to find the helicopter where U.S. soldiers rescue them and take them to refuge.

6 months later, Port Gamble is out of quarantine and begins to repopulate. Mrs. Banks is now the mayor of the town, and Frida runs her deceased father's diner. Tom and Lance propose that she stay with them in NYC. She declines but promises to see them soon. Tom and Lance leave while Larry and the married couple enjoy a meal at Frida's diner.

== Cast ==
- Janette Armand as Frida Abbas
- Doug Fahl as Tom Hunt
- Cooper Hopkins as Lance Murphy
- Bill Johns as Reverend Haggis
- Russell Hodgkinson as Joe Miller
- Ali Hamedani as Ali Abbas
- Cornelia Moore as Cheryl Banks
- James Mesher as Mayor Burton
- Andrew Hyde as Brian Miller
- Ryan Barret as Derek Blaine
- Victoria Drake as Judy Miller
- Linda Jensen as Mrs. Hunt
- Sydney Sweeney as Lisa

== Production ==
ZMD: Zombies of Mass Destruction premiered at Film Fest DC and has screened at the Seattle International Film Festival, the Minneapolis-St. Paul International Film Festival, the Los Angeles Film Festival, and Philadelphia's QFest. The film runs at 8 Films To Die For, also known as the After Dark Horrorfest. It premiered on January 29 at NYC Zombie Village Crawl. The DVD was released on March 23, 2010, in the United States, and included information on the making of the film.

ZMD: Zombies of Mass Destruction is not related to the comic series of the same name by writer Kevin Grevioux.

It also features the film debut of Sydney Sweeney in a small role.
