= Lamar Nelson =

Jamaican footballer (born 1991)

Personal information
- Full name: Lamar Delmarro Nelson
- Date of birth: 19 August 1991 (age 35)
- Position: Midfielder

Team information
- Current team: Waterhouse F.C.

Senior career*
Years	Team	Apps	(Gls)
2009 – 2013	Arnett Gardens F.C.		
2013 – 2015	Waterhouse F.C.	16	(2)
2015 –	Arnett Gardens F.C.		

International career
2012–	Jamaica	1	(0)
- * Club domestic league appearances and goals

Lamar Delmarro Nelson is a Jamaican footballer who plays for Arnett Gardens F.C. in the top-flight Jamaica National Premier League. He is also known as "Wanka".

== Club career ==
Nelson started his senior career at Arnett Gardens F.C.

In 2013, Nelson signed with Waterhouse FC in the RSPL. After an extended layoff due to knee surgery, in June 2015, Nelson returned to Arnett Gardens.

== International career ==
He made his international début for Jamaica in a 0–0 with Martinique on 10 December 2012 in the 2012 Caribbean Cup.
