= Nicolas Zaïre =

Martiniquais footballer (born 1986)

Nicolas Zaire
Personal information
- Full name: Nicolas Zaire
- Date of birth: December 7, 1986 (age 39)
- Place of birth: Martinique
- Height: 1.87 m (6 ft 2 in)
- Position: Defender

Team information
- Current team: Club Franciscain

Youth career
- –2005: Olympique du Marin

Senior career*
Years	Team	Apps	(Gls)
2005–2014	RC Rivière-Pilote		
2014–	Club Franciscain		

International career
2010–	Martinique		
- * Club domestic league appearances and goals as of 30 July 2018

Nicolas Zaire (born 7 December 1986) is a professional footballer who plays as a defender for Club Franciscain in the Martinique Championnat National and internationally for Martinique.

He made his debut for Martinique in 2010. He was in the Martinique Gold Cup squads for the 2013 and 2017 tournaments.
