= Lionel Ravi =

Martiniquais footballer (born 1985)

Personal information
- Full name: Lionel Christian Ravi
- Date of birth: November 12, 1985 (age 40)
- Place of birth: Martinique
- Position: Midfielder

Team information
- Current team: ASPTT de Champigny sur Mare

Senior career*
Years	Team	Apps	(Gls)
2008–2010	CS Case-Pilote		
2010–2012	Golden Lion		
2012–??	Club Franciscain		
- ASPTT de Champigny sur Mare

International career
2010–	Martinique		
- * Club domestic league appearances and goals

Lionel Ravi (born 12 November 1985 in Martinique) is a professional footballer who plays as a midfielder for Club Franciscain in the Martinique Championnat National and internationally for Martinique.

He played for CS Case-Pilote until joining Golden Lion in 2010.

In 2018, he was playing in France for ASPTT de Champigny sur Mare

He made his debut for Martinique in 2010. He was in the Martinique Gold Cup squad for the 2013 tournament.
