= CA San Cristóbal =

Dominican professional football club

Atlético San Cristóbal
- Nickname(s): Club Atlético San Cristóbal
- Founded: January 1, 2015; 10 years ago
- Ground: Estadio Panamericano; San Cristóbal, Dominican Republic
- Capacity: 2,800
- Chairman: Juan Guerra
- Manager: Daniel Fernando Alvarez
- League: Liga Dominicana de Fútbol
- 2025: 12th

Club Atlético San Cristóbal, commonly known as Atlético San Cristóbal, is a Dominican Republic professional football club which competes in the Liga Dominicana de Fútbol. It is also known as AirEuropa San Cristóbal for sponsorship reasons. The club is based in San Cristóbal. The club was established in 2015 after the Dominican Football Federation announced the creation of a professional league, the Liga Dominicana de Fútbol.

== Players ==
=== Current roster 2021–22 ===
Note: Flags indicate national team as defined under FIFA eligibility rules; some limited exceptions apply. Players may hold more than one non-FIFA nationality.

No.	Pos.	Nation	Player
1	GK	BOL	Juan Pedraza
2	MF	DOM	Christopher Almonte
3	DF	DOM	Francis González
4	DF	DOM	Néstor Moquete
5	MF	PER	Sebastián Ternero
7	MF	HAI	Frantzety Herard
8	MF	HAI	Wachmy Toussaint
9	FW	COL	Jaime Vélez
10	FW	DOM	Miguel Beriguete
12	FW	PUR	Jan Mateo
13	DF	DOM	Welvin Sánchez
14	DF	DOM	Roberto Sena

No.	Pos.	Nation	Player
15	MF	DOM	Daniel Joseph
17	MF	DOM	Samir de la Rosa
18	DF	DOM	Hansley Martínez
19	FW	DOM	Dauli Reyes
20	DF	COL	Erlan Díaz
21	GK	DOM	Christopher Japa
22	DF	DOM	Dionicio Pérez
23	DF	DOM	Ángel Roa
24	DF	DOM	Kleffer Martes
27	MF	DOM	Luis Pereyra
30	DF	DOM	Brandol Marte
