= William Séry =

Martiniquais footballer (born 1988)

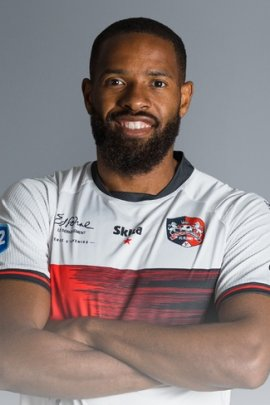

Personal information
- Date of birth: 20 March 1988 (age 38)
- Place of birth: Paris, France
- Height: 1.83 m (6 ft 0 in)
- Position: Centre-back

Team information
- Current team: Fleury 91

Youth career
- 2001–2006: PSG
- 2006–2009: Laval

Senior career*
Years	Team	Apps	(Gls)
2009–2010	Saint-Dié	27	(0)
2010–2013	Raon-l'Étape	105	(5)
2013–2014	Lyon-Duchère	22	(1)
2014–2015	Moulins	28	(0)
2015–2018	Quevilly-Rouen	85	(5)
2018–2019	Giresunspor	7	(1)
2019–	Fleury 91	53	(3)

International career
2012	Martinique	7	(0)
- * Club domestic league appearances and goals as of 1 July 2022

William Séry (born 20 March 1988) is a Martiniquais professional footballer who plays as a centre-back for FC Fleury 91.

== Club career ==
A long time footballer in the lower divisions of France, Séry made his professional debut for Quevilly-Rouen in a Ligue 2 1–1 tie with FC Lorient on 29 July 2017.

Séry joined FC Fleury 91 ahead of the 2019–20 season in June 2019.

== International career ==
Séry represented Martinique national team at the 2013 Gold Cup.
