= Emmanuel Vermignon =

French association football player (born 1989)

Personal information
- Full name: Emmanuel Alexis Vermignon
- Date of birth: January 20, 1989 (age 37)
- Place of birth: Fort-de-France, Martinique
- Position: Goalkeeper

Team information
- Current team: Club Colonial

Senior career*
Years	Team	Apps	(Gls)
–2008	Good Luck		
2008–2011	Club Franciscain		
2011–	Club Colonial		

International career
2010–	Martinique	19	(0)
- * Club domestic league appearances and goals

Emmanuel Vermignon (born 20 January 1989) is a professional footballer who plays as a goalkeeper for Club Colonial in the Martinique Championnat National and internationally for Martinique.

He made his debut for Martinique in 2010 and was in the Martinique Gold Cup squads for the 2013 and 2017 tournaments.
