= ZMD: Zombies of Mass Destruction (comics) =

Comic book series

Publication information
- Publisher: Red 5 Comics
- Schedule: Bi-monthly
- Format: Limited series
- Genre
- Publication date: July 2008 - February 2010
- No. of issues: 6

Creative team
- Created by: Kevin Grevioux
- Written by: Kevin Grevioux
- Penciller(s): Geraldo Borges; Dave Youkovich
- Inker(s): Tony Kordos; Jimmy Reyes; David Rivera; Michael Babinkski; Jimmy Reyes; Nick Schley
- Letterer: Troy Peteri
- Colorist: Andrew Dalhouse
- Editor: Vincent S. Moore

ZMD: Zombies of Mass Destruction is a six-issue comic book limited series published by Red 5 Comics and created by American comic book writer/creator Kevin Grevioux who wrote the original screenplay for the film Underworld, and co-created Underworld franchise.

== Plot ==
The story revolves around a government weapons program that drops photosensitive zombies into war zones at night to destroy the enemy population. When one of these zombies somehow escapes in the Middle East, a team of elite soldiers must enter hostile territory to stop a growing zombie army.

== Film ==
As of July 2008, the property has been optioned for a film by the management/production company Benderspink. In early 2009, Dirk Blackman and Howard McCain were hired to work on the script.
