= Las Tunas Province =

Province of Cuba

- Province of Cuba
- Coat of arms

- Country: Cuba
- Capital: Las Tunas

Government
  - President: Yelenis Tornet Menéndez "[4]".

Area
  - Total: 6,595.25 km^{2} (2,546.44 sq mi)

Population (2021-12-31)
  - Total: 528,853
  - Density: 80.1870/km^{2} (207.683/sq mi)
- Time zone: UTC-5 (EST)
- Area code: +53-31
- HDI (2019): 0.755 high · 16th of 16
- Website: https://www.lastunas.gob.cu/es/

Las Tunas is one of the provinces of Cuba. Major towns include Puerto Padre, Amancio, and the capital city, Las Tunas (historically Victoria de Las Tunas). It occupies 6% of the country's land mass. The city of Las Tunas is its capital and most populous urban center. It is one of the youngest provinces, having been created in 1975 from territories belonging to the former provinces of Camagüey and Oriente.

== Climate and agriculture ==
The southern coast, which opens onto the Gulf of Guacanayabo, is marshy and characterised by mangroves. This wet area is used to grow sugarcane, as the wet climate is well suited for the crop.

Cattle are also grazed in the province.

== History ==
Las Tunas was part of the Oriente province, until that province was divided into five smaller provinces in 1975.

In the same year, a large development program was started to modernize the town of Las Tunas and connect it by road to Havana.

== Municipalities ==
Municipality	Population (2022)	Area (km²)	Location	Remarks
Amancio	36,132	857	20.81972°N 77.58417°W	(Note: Former municipality of a then-larger Camagüey Province.)
Colombia	31,482	563	20.99083°N 77.41583°W	
Jesús Menéndez	46,729	638	21.16361°N 76.47722°W	
Jobabo	40,345	884	20.90806°N 77.28306°W	
Las Tunas	214,939	891	20.96000°N 76.95444°W	Provincial capital
Majibacoa	40,235	621	20.91722°N 76.87611°W	Calixto
Manatí	28,773	953	21.31472°N 76.93750°W	
Puerto Padre	90,218	1,178	21.19528°N 76.60139°W	
Sources: Population from 2004 Census. Area from 1976 municipal re-distribution.

== Demographics ==
In 2004, the province of Las Tunas had a population of 529,850. With a total area of 6,587.75 km^{2} (2,543.54 sq mi), the province had a population density of 80.4/km^{2} (208/sq mi).

== See also ==
- Oriente Province
