= Primera División de Republica Dominicana =

Liga Mayor
- Founded: 1970
- Folded: 2015
- Confederation: CONCACAF
- Number of clubs: 8
- Level on pyramid: 1
- International cup: CONCACAF Champions League
- Last champions: Moca FC (11th title)
- Most championships: Moca FC (11 titles)

Primera División de Republica Dominicana was the former top division of the Federación Dominicana de Fútbol. Established in 1970, since 2002 this competition serves as second level to the Liga Mayor (see below). The 2005 edition also was played without clubs from the 2004–05 Liga Mayor – apart from the relegated teams Jarabacoa and Santo Domingo Savio (La Vega). In 2015 the league was replaced by Liga Dominicana de Fútbol, the first professional football league in Dominican Republic.

== 2025-2026standings ==
1.Moca FC                                          14  11  2  1  35- 5  35  Champions
2.Universidad O&M FC                               14   9  3  2  29- 7  30
3.Bauger FC                                        14   8  3  3  27-14  27
4.Club Deportivo Pantoja                           14   6  4  4  27-15  22
5.San Cristóbal FC                                 14   5  4  5  23-21  19
6.Bayaguana FC                                     14   4  2  8  15-35  14
7.Club Barcelona Atlético (Sporting Santo Domingo) 14   2  1 11  17-38   7
8.Jarabacoa FC                                     14   1  1 12  12-50   4

== Liga Mayor - 2016 Teams ==
- Atlántico FC (Puerto Plata)
- Atlético San Cristóbal (San Cristóbal)
- Atlético Vega Real (La Vega)
- Bauger FC (Santo Domingo)
- Cibao FC (Santiago de los Caballeros)
- Club Atlético Pantoja (Santo Domingo)
- Club Barcelona Atlético (Santo Domingo)
- Delfines del Este FC (La Romana)
- Moca FC (Moca)
- O&M FC (Santo Domingo)

== Previous winners ==
=== Primera División ===
- 1970 : España FC (Santo Domingo)
- 1971 : España FC (Santo Domingo)
- 1972 : UCMM (Santiago de los Caballeros)
- 1973 : UCMM (Santiago de los Caballeros)
- 1974 : UCMM (Santiago de los Caballeros)
- 1975 : Unknown
- 1976 : Don Bosco (Moca)
- 1977 : Don Bosco (Moca)
- 1978 : Don Bosco (Moca)
- 1979 : Unknown
- 1980 : Unknown
- 1981 : Universidad Autónoma (Santo Domingo)
- 1982 : Unknown
- 1983 : Unknown
- 1984 : Unknown
- 1985 : Don Bosco (Moca)
- 1986 : Don Bosco (Moca)
- 1987 : Don Bosco (Moca)
- 1988–89 : Universidad Autónoma (Santo Domingo)
- 1989–90 : Universidad Autónoma (Santo Domingo)
- 1991 : Bancredicard (San Cristóbal)
- 1992 : Bancredicard (San Cristóbal)
- 1993 : San Cristóbal FC
- 1994 : Bancredicard (San Cristóbal)
- 1995 : Don Bosco (Moca)
- 1997 : FC Santos (San Cristóbal)
- 1998 : Domingo Savio (La Vega)
- 1999 : Don Bosco (Moca)
- 2000–01 : CD Pantoja
- 2001–02 : Unknown
- 2002–03 : CD Pantoja (or Domingo Savio (La Vega))
- 2003–04 : Casa de España
- 2005 : Jarabacoa
- 2006 : Domingo Savio (La Vega)

=== Liga Mayor ===
- 2001–02 : Baninter (Jarabacoa)
- 2002–03 : Baninter (Jarabacoa)
- 2004–05 : CD Pantoja
- 2007 : Club Barcelona Atlético (Santo Domingo)
- 2009 : CD Pantoja
- 2010 : Moca FC
- 2011–12 : CD Pantoja
- 2012–13 : Moca FC
- 2014 : Moca FC

== Best scorers ==
| Year | Best scorers | Team | Goals |
|---|---|---|---|
| 1992 | (Dominican Republic) Dinardo Rodríguez | UNPHU | |
| 1993 | (Dominican Republic) Dinardo Rodríguez | CA Dominguito | |
| 2001–02 | (Dominican Republic) Oscar Mejía | Baninter | 11 |
| 2004–05 | (Dominican Republic) Jonathan Faña | Don Bosco Moca | 20 |
| 2007 | (Haiti) Wilson Sarilux | San Cristobal | 18 |
| 2009 | (Dominican Republic) Manuel Perez | Atlético Pantoja | 10 |
| 2011–12 | (Haiti) Kens Germain | Club Barcelona Atletico | 9 |
| 2012–13 | (Dominican Republic) Abiorix Valenzuela | San Cristobal | 12 |
| 2013-14 | (Haiti) Alexandre Boucicaut | San Cristobal | 9 |

== Multiple hat-tricks ==
| Rank | Country | Player | Hat-tricks |
|---|---|---|---|
| 1 | (Dominican Republic) | Jonathan Faña | 3 |
| 2 | (Dominican Republic) | Darling Batista | 1 |
| 2 | (Haiti) | Kens Germain | 1 |
| 2 | (Dominican Republic) | Ramon Mariano | 1 |
| 2 | (Dominican Republic) | Domingo Peralta | 1 |
| 2 | (Dominican Republic) | Manuel Perez | 1 |
| 2 | (Dominican Republic) | Manuel Reynoso | 1 |
| 2 | (Haiti) | Wilson Sarilux | 1 |
