= San Cristóbal FC =

- Full name: San Cristóbal Football Club
- Dissolved: 2014
- Ground: Estadio Panamericano, San Cristóbal, San Cristóbal
- Capacity: 3,000
- League: Primera División de Republica Dominicana
Home colours	Away colours

San Cristóbal FC was a football team based in San Cristóbal, Dominican Republic. It played until 2014 in the defunct Primera División de Republica Dominicana.

The team disappeared in 2014 following the professionalization of the Dominican football. A new club was created in Sán Cristóbal that year, called Atlético San Cristóbal that from 2015 competes in the Liga Dominicana de Fútbol.

== Stadium ==
The team played at the 3000 capacity Estadio Panamericano, San Cristóbal.
