= 2022–23 Danish Cup =

Pokalen (The Cup)
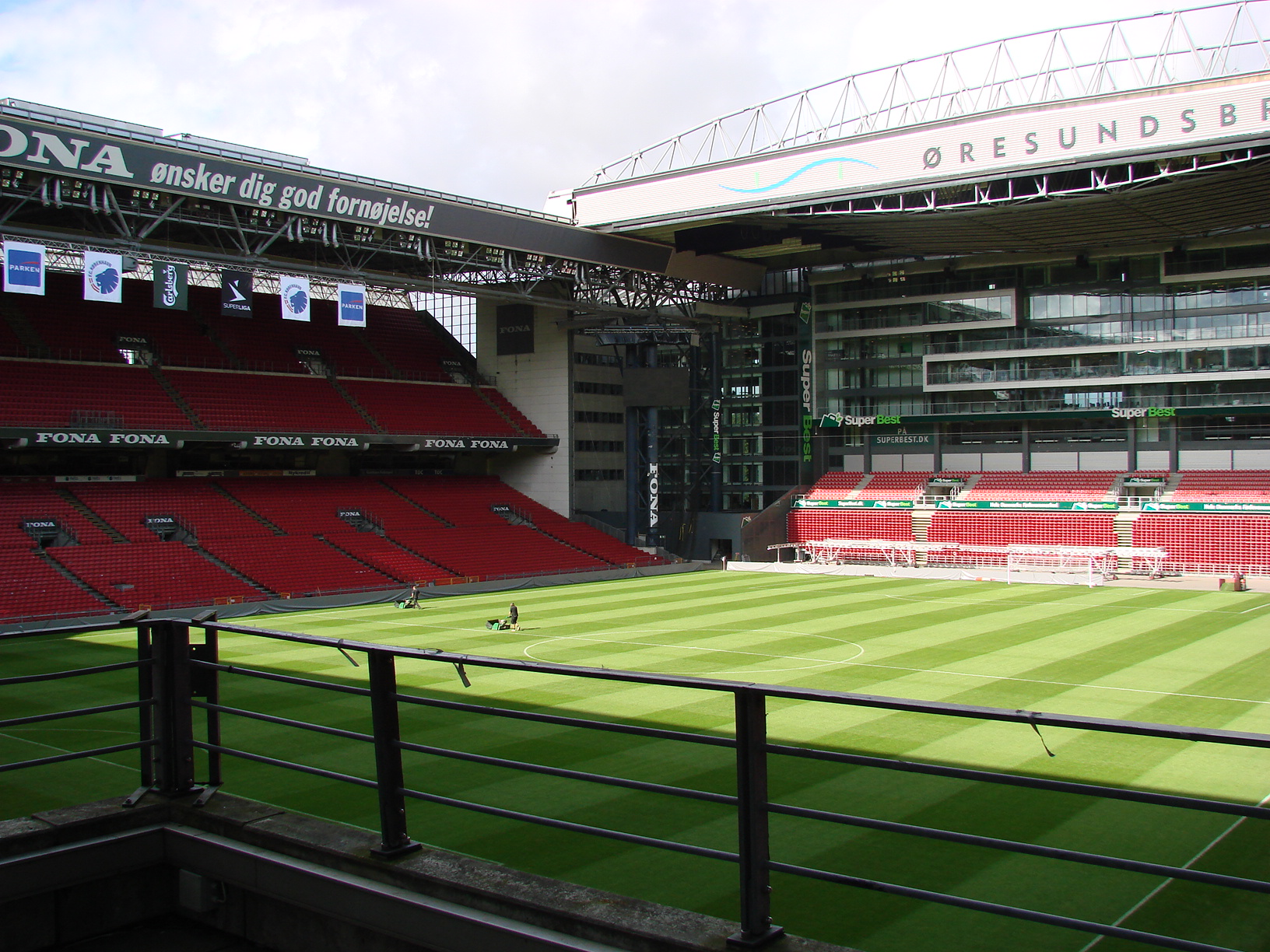
- Parken Stadium hosted the final

Tournament details
- Country: Denmark
- Teams: 104

Final positions
- Champions: Copenhagen (9th title)
- Runners-up: AaB

The 2022–23 Danish Cup, also known as Pokalen, was the 69th season of the Danish Cup competition. F.C. Copenhagen took the tournament, securing its 9th Cup with a 1–0 win over AaB and qualifying for the Europa Conference League second qualifying round.

== Structure ==
92 teams participate in the first round, coming from all levels of competition. Six additional teams will join in the second round, while the top six teams from the 2021–22 Danish Superliga enter in the third round.

Round	Date	Number of fixtures	Clubs remaining	New entries this round	Teams entering this round
First Round	2-4 August 2022	46	104 → 58	40	12 Nordicbet Liga teams 12 2nd Division teams 10 3rd Division teams 23 Danmarksserien teams 2 Fynserien teams 5 Jyllandsserien teams 4 Kobenhavnsserien teams 8 Sjaellandsserien teams 1 Lolland-Falsterserien team 9 Serie 1 teams 2 Serie 2 teams 4 Serie 3 teams
Second Round	30 August-1 September 2022	26	58 → 32	6	6 Superliga teams (7-12)
Third Round	18-20 October 2022	32	32 → 16	6	6 Superliga teams (1-6)
Fourth Round	8-10 November 2022	16	16 → 8	None	None
Quarter-Finals	28 Feb - 2 March 2023 6-7 April 2023	4	8 → 4	None	None
Semi-Finals	28 February-2 March 2023 6-7 April 2023	2	4 → 2	None	None
Final	18 May 2023	1	2 → 1	None	None

== Participants ==
104 teams will compete for the Danish Cup. All teams from the top three divisions in 2021–22 were automatically entered, while 54 teams from lower division teams qualified through qualifying matches to enter the competition proper.

== First round ==
There was 92 teams:

- 54 teams from the qualifying rounds
- 10 teams from 2021–22 Danish 3rd Division
  - Dalum IF
  - FC Roskilde
  - BK Frem
  - IF Lyseng
  - Næsby BK
  - VSK Aarhus
  - Karlslunde IF
  - KFUM Roskilde
  - Vanløse IF
  - Young Boys FD
- 12 teams from 2021–22 Danish 2nd Division
  - Aarhus Fremad
  - AB Gladsaxe
  - B.93
  - Brabrand IF
  - FA 2000
  - HIK
  - Hillerød Fodbold
  - Kolding IF
  - Middelfart G&BK
  - Næstved BK
  - Skive IK
  - Thisted FC
- 10 teams from 2021–22 Danish 1st Division
  - FC Fredericia
  - FC Helsingør
  - Hvidovre IF
  - Nykøbing FC
  - Esbjerg fB
  - Fremad Amager
  - HB Køge
  - Hobro IK
  - Jammerbugt FC
  - Vendsyssel FF
- 2 teams from 2021–22 Danish Superliga
  - SønderjyskE
  - Vejle

In the first round of the tournament, 92 teams took part, including 54 clubs from the various levels of the Denmark Series and below, 10 out of 12 clubs from the Danish 3rd Division and all from Danish 2nd Division, the 3rd-12th placed teams from the 2021-22 Danish 1st Division and the 11th-12th placed teams from the 2021-22 Danish Superliga. Teams are split into three regions:

- Zealand/Bornholm/Falster/Lolland (44 teams)
- Fyn/Southern Jutland (24 teams)
- Middle/Northern Jutland (24 teams)

Number of teams per tier still in competition
3F Superliga (tier 1)	NordicBet Liga (tier 2)	2. Division; (tier 3)	3. Division; (tier 4)	Danmarksserien (tier 5)	Regional-series (tier 6)	Serie 1, 2 & 3 (tier 7, 8 & 9)	Total
12 / 12	12 / 12	12 / 12	10 / 10	23 / 23	19 / 19	16 / 16	104 / 104

=== Zealand/Bornholm/Falster/Lolland ===
29 July 2022	B.93 (3)	1–3 (a.e.t.)	FC Roskilde (3)	Østerbro Stadium, Copenhagen
19:00	Conley (yellow card) 57'; Morberg (yellow card) 69'; Iqpal (yellow card) 82'; Carrara (yellow card) 90'; Croner 111'; Anker (yellow card) 123'	Report	Chabert 99' (pen.); Montell 110'; Larsen 120'; Etim (yellow card) 121'	Attendance: 350; Referee: Kasper Madsen

2 August 2022	Hvidovre IF (2)	2–4	FC Helsingør (2)	Pro Ventilation Arena, Hvidovre
18:00	Smed 7'; Helstrup 69' (o.g.)	Report	Drost 21'; McCowatt 27'; Adamsen 66', 84'	Referee: Simon Rasmussen

2 August 2022	Hellerup IK (3)	0–1	Nykøbing FC (2)	Gentofte Sportspark, Hellerup
18:00

2 August 2022	Fremad Amager (2)	1–0	Hillerød Fodbold (2)	Sundby Idrætspark, Copenhagen
18:00

2 August 2022	Allerød FK (5)	3–1	KFUM Roskilde (5)	Allerød Idrætspark, Lillerød
18:00

2 August 2022	Herlev IF (5)	0–2	Vanløse IF (4)	Herlev Stadium, Herlev
18:00

2 August 2022	Såby Fodbold (6)	1–3	BK Frem (3)	Såby Stadium, Såby
18:00

2 August 2022	Ringsted IF (6)	0–3	Næstved BK (2)	Ringsted Stadion, Ringsted
18:00

2 August 2022	Skovshoved IF (6)	0–4	HB Køge (2)	Skovshoved Idrætspark, Klampenborg
18:00

2 August 2022	KFUM (5)	1–3	Karlslunde IF (5)	Emdrupparken, Copenhagen
18:00

2 August 2022	Solrød FC (6)	0–3	Ishøj IF (4)	Solrød Idrætscenter, Solrød Strand
18:30

2 August 2022	BK Avarta (5)	1–3	FA 2000 (4)	Espelundens Idrætsanlæg, Rødovre
18:30

3 August 2022	Frederiksberg BK (6)	2–4	AB (3)	Frederiksberg IP, Frederiksberg
19:00

3 August 2022	Listrup U&IF (6)	0–6	Brønshøj BK (5)	LUIF's Anlæg, Nykøbing Falster
18:00

4 August 2022	Mosede BK (9)	0–3	Kastrup BK (7)	Mosede-Skolen, Mosede
18:00

4 August 2022	Tune IF (7)	1–5	Tårnby FF (5)	Tune Stadion, Tune
18:00

4 August 2022	Tuse IF (6)	2–1	NB Bornholm (6)	Tusehallen, Tuse
18:00

4 August 2022	Jyllinge FC (7)	3-0	BK Union (6)	Spraglehøj Idrætsanlæg, Jyllinge
18:00

4 August 2022	Dragør BK (7)	0–5	BSF (6)	Dragør Bk, Dragør
18:00

4 August 2022	B. 73, Slagelse (7)	0–4	Hørsholm-Usserød IK (6)	Stadion Vest, Slagelse
18:30

4 August 2022	B. 1973, Herlev (8)	1–5	FC Nakskov (6)	Elverroad Kunstgræs, Herlev
18:30

8 August 2022	FC Culpa (9)	2–0	Maribo BK (7)	Valby Idrætspark, Valby
19:00

=== Fyn/Southern Jutland ===
2 August 2022	Varde IF (5)	3–1	Tarup-Paarup IF (5)	Vestjysk Bank Stadion, Varde
18:00

2 August 2022	Slagelse B&I (5)	0–5	SønderjyskE (2)	Slagelse Stadium, Slagelse
18:00

2 August 2022	Broager UI (8)	0–8	FC Fredericia (2)	Broager Idrætscenter, Broager
18:00

2 August 2022	OKS (5)	1–5	Vejle Boldklub (2)	OKSon Park, Odense
18:00

2 August 2022	Aabenraa BK (6)	1–2	SfB-Oure FA (4)	Aabenraa Stadion, Aabenraa
18:00

2 August 2022	Hedensted IF (5)	1–0	Dalum IF (4)	Hedensted Stadion, Hedensted
18:00

2 August 2022	Give Fremad (8)	0–7	Middelfart BK (4)	Give Stadion, Give
18:00

2 August 2022	Kolding IF (3)	2–0	Esbjerg fB (3)	Autocentralen Park, Kolding
19:00

3 August 2022	B1909 (5)	0–1	BK Marienlyst (5)	B1909 Anlæg, Odense
18:00

3 August 2022	Haarby BK (7)	0-3	Næsby BK (4)	Haarby Stadion, Haarby
18:00

4 August 2022	Sædding-Guldager IF (6)	8–7	Marstal/Rise (6)	Guldager Idrætscenter, Guldager
18:00

4 August 2022	Munkebo Bold-og IK (7)	0–1	Kerteminde BK (6)	Munkebo Idrætscenter, Munkebo
18:00

=== Middle/Northern Jutland ===
2 August 2022	Vejgaard BK (5)	0–2	Hobro IK (2)	Spar Nord Arena, Vejgaard
18:00

2 August 2022	Odder IGF (5)	5–6	Brabrand IF (3)	Spektrum Park, Odder
18:00

2 August 2022	Kjellerup IF (5)	1–4	Young Boys FD (4)	Bjergets Idrætsanlæg, Odder
18:00

2 August 2022	Farsø/Ullits IK (6)	1–4	Skive IK (3)	Farsø Stadion, Farsø
18:30

2 August 2022	AIA/Tranbjerg (9)	0–9	Aarhus Fremad (3)	Grønløkke Stadion, Tranbjerg
18:30

2 August 2022	Nørresundby FB (5)	1–5	Thisted FC (3)	Nordjyske Bank Arena, Nørresundby
18:30

2 August 2022	Klitmøller IF (9)	1–2	Jammerbugt FC (3)	Klitmøller Stadion, Klitmøller
18:30

2 August 2022	VRI (5)	0–2	Viby IF (5)	NES Park, Risskov
18:30

2 August 2022	Øster Hornum IF (10)	0–8	Ringkøbing IF (5)	Øster Hornum Hallen, Øster Hornum
18:45

2 August 2022	Vatanspor (6)	2–0	IF Lyseng (4)	Sødalskolen, Brabrand
18:45

3 August 2022	VSK Aarhus (4)	1–3	Vendsyssel FF (2)	Vejlby/Risskov Centret, Risskov
18:00

4 August 2022	Frederikshavn fI (6)	3–0	ASA Aarhus (5)	Empire Stadium, Frederikshavn
18:00

== Second round ==
There was 52 teams:

- 46 teams from the 1st round (winners)
  - Tier 2: FC Helsingør, Nykøbing FC, Fremad Amager, HB Køge, SønderjyskE, FC Fredericia, Vejle Boldklub, Hobro IK, Vendsyssel FF
  - Tier 3: FC Roskilde, BK Frem, Næstved BK, AB, Kolding IF, Brabrand IF, Skive IK, Aarhus Fremad, Thisted FC
  - Tier 4: Vanløse IF, BK Frem, Ishøj IF FA 2000, SfB-Oure FA, Middelfart BK, Næsby BK, Young Boys FD
  - Tier 5: Allerød FK, Karlslunde IF, Brønshøj BK, Tårnby FF, Varde IF, Hedensted IF, BK Marienlyst, Viby IF, Ringkøbing IF
  - Tier 6: Tuse IF, BSF, Hørsholm-Usserød IK, FC Nakskov, Sædding-Guldager IF, Kerteminde BK, Vatanspor, Frederikshavn fI
  - Tier 7, 8 & 9: Kastrup BK Jyllinge FC, FC Culpa, Klitmøller IF
- 4 teams from the 2021–22 Danish Superliga (7th–10th placed)
  - AGF
  - Nordsjælland
  - OB
  - Viborg
- The 2021–22 Danish 1st Division champions and runners-up
  - AC Horsens
  - Lyngby Boldklub

Number of teams per tier still in competition
3F Superliga (tier 1)	NordicBet Liga (tier 2)	2. Division; (tier 3)	3. Division; (tier 4)	Danmarksserien (tier 5)	Regional-series (tier 6)	Serie 1, 2 & 3 (tier 7, 8 & 9)	Total
12 / 12	10 / 12	9 / 12	7 / 10	9 / 23	8 / 19	4 / 16	58 / 104

=== West ===
30 August 2022	Hedensted IF (5)	1–2	Thisted FC (3)	Hedensted Stadium, Hedensted
17:15	Jørgensen (yellow card) 18'; Suljic 32'		Trier (yellow card) 49'; Svenningsen (yellow card) 59'; Bustamante 74' (pen.); Lagergaard 78'

30 August 2022	Varde IF (5)	0–2	Aarhus Fremad (3)	Sydbank Stadium, Varde
17:15	Van Beest (yellow card) 53'; Kilmark (yellow card) 64'		Hansen 40'; Andreasen 90+5'	Referee: Allan Staal

30 August 2022	Middelfart BK (4)	1–0	FC Fredericia (2)	Middelfart Stadium
17:15	Fazlagic 86'			Referee: Peter Kjærsgaard-Andersen

30 August 2022	Young Boys FD (4)	0–1	Brabrand IF (3)	JYSK Park, Silkeborg
17:15	Hykkelbjerg (yellow card) 50' (yellow-red card) 50'		Olesen (yellow card) 83'; Helev 86'	Referee: Sandi Putros

30 August 2022	BK Marienlyst (5)	0–3	Vejle Boldklub (2)	Marienlystcenteret, Odense
18:30	Hyldgaard (yellow card) 35'; Beriev (yellow card) 86'		Emmanouilidis 45'; Ponce 58'; Gammelgaard 82'

30 August 2022	Kolding IF (3)	0–2	SønderjyskE (2)	Autocentral Parken, Kolding
19:00	Kiilerich (red card) 52'; Sommer (yellow card) 76'		Wikström 8'; Gallegos 53'	Referee: Jakob Kehlet

31 August 2022	Viby IF (5)	0–7	Viborg FF (1)	Viby Idrætspark, Viby J
17:15			Jatta 12', 16', 51', 89'; Mortimer 24'; Søndergaard 43', 72'	Referee: Mads-Kristoffer Kristoffersen

31 August 2022	Ringkøbing IF (5)	1–2	AC Horsens (1)	Green Arena, Ringkøbing
17:15	Lauridsen 3'; Egelund (yellow card) 89'; Magnussen (yellow card) 90+3'		Iyede 14'; Lauridsen 44' (o.g.)

31 August 2022	Næsby BK (4)	3–2 (a.e.t.)	Skive IK (3)	ALPI Arena Næsby, Næsby
17:15	Pedersen 10'; Espersen (yellow card) 42'; Molberg (yellow card) 56'; Ibsen (yellow card) 82'; Petersen 90+1', 115'; Stangerup (yellow card) 119'		Skou (yellow card) 12'; Gertsen (yellow card) 17'; Ihler 21'; Bager 75'; Vetter (yellow card) 82' (yellow-red card) 117'; Mehanovic (yellow card) 114' (yellow-red card) 118'; Leth (yellow card) 116'	Attendance: Jonas Bøgelund

31 August 2022	Frederikshavn fI (6)	2–7	Vendsyssel FF (2)	Empire Stadium, Frederikshavn
19:00	Seerup (yellow card) 33'; Bowman 53'; Guldager 78'		Schwartz 15' (red card) 28'; Konaté 19', 21'; Lange 25'; Kjellerup 68'; Abou Ali 75'; Søjberg 90+1'	Referee: Michael Rasmussen

1 September 2022	Vatanspor (6)	0–8	AGF (1)	Ceres Park
18:30	Nasir (yellow card) 90'		Haugen 16', 17', 58'; Bisseck 36'; Tingager 63'; Brandhof 65', 70'; Yakob 81'	Referee: Aydin Uslu

4 September 2022	Klitmøller IF (9)	0–1	Sædding-Guldager IF (6)	Klitmøller Stadion, Klitmøller
14:00	Steinfath (yellow card) 52'; Olsen (yellow card) 90'		Morten Nielsen 34'; Lange (yellow card) 85'	Referee: Martin Bodker Jensen

6 September 2022	SfB-Oure FA (4)	0–3	Hobro IK (2)	Høje Bøge, Svendborg
17:00	O'Hara (yellow card) 27'; Lorentzen (yellow card) 58'		Yoda (yellow card) 11'; Brajanac 20'; Søgaard 54'; Sjkellerup 89'	Referee: Jonas Bæk

=== East ===
24 August 2022	FC Helsingør (2)	2–0	Lyngby (1)	OPV Stadium, Helsingør
18:00	Kass Kawo (yellow card) 8'; Klitten (yellow card) 31'; Geertsen (yellow card) 42'; McCowatt 47'; Lyng 70'		Corlu (yellow card) 62'; Hey (yellow card) 79'	Attendance: 1,034; Referee: Jakob A. Sundberg

30 August 2022	Kastrup BK (7)	1–2 (a.e.t.)	AB (3)	Kastrup Idrætsanlæg
17:15	Christiansen (yellow card) 46'; Westen 75'; Sørensen (yellow card) 94'; Jørgensen (yellow card) 111'		Nørager 50'; Wass 114'; Gudmann (yellow card) 116'; Atici (yellow card) 119'; Ellegaard (yellow card) 120'	Referee: Nicki Nordlund Hansen

30 August 2022	Jyllinge FC (7)	0–5	Næstved BK (2)	Sparglehøj Idrætsanlæg,Jyllinge
17:15	M. Schubert (yellow card) 79'; E. Schubert (yellow card) 89'		Garly 40'; Agger 50', 82'; Khemdee (yellow card) 65'; M. Christiansen 65'; Henriksen 66'	Referee: Sebastrian Friis Aagerup

30 August 2022	Kerteminde BK (6)	1–1 (a.e.t.) (1–3 p)	HB Køge (2)	Albani Stadium Kerteminde, Kerteminde
17:15	Eriksen 33' (pen.)		Mehder (yellow card) 31'; Buch 47'	Referee: Mads-Kristoffer Kristoffersen

30 August 2022	Tårnby FF (5)	1–2	Fremad Amager (2)	Vestamager Idrætsanlæg,Amager
17:15	Moos (yellow card) 31'; Hjulmand 44'		Johansson 35'; Boateng 49'; Haren (yellow card) 64'	Referee: Mostafa Seyfi

30 August 2022	Hørsholm-Usserød IK (6)	5–0	Tuse IF (6)	Hørsholm Idrætspark, Rungsted Kyst
17:15	Pind 20'; Dam 31', 45'; Vaerslev 78'; Sondergaard 90+3'		Frendrup (yellow card) 56'; Bruun (yellow card) 72'	Referee: Oliver Simbold

30 August 2022	Brønshøj BK (5)	1–5	Ishøj IF (4)	Tingbjerg Idrætspark, Brønshøj
18:30	Hashiba (yellow card) 13'; Veltz (yellow card) 61'; Orbe 78'		Kutlu (yellow card) 16'; Azaquoun 20', 22', 53'; Stückler 89'	Referee: Casper Thorsøe

31 August 2022	Allerød FK (5)	0–3	FA 2000 (4)	Allerød Idrætspark, Lillerød
17:15	Karjasevic (yellow card) 75'		Holmelund 30'; Ravn (yellow card) 35'; Jalal 42'; Milner 45'; Hassan (yellow card) 80'	Referee: Frederikke Lyida Søkjær

31 August 2022	BK Frem (3)	0–1	Nordsjælland (1)	Valby Idrætspark, Stadium
18:00	Jørgensen (yellow card) 57'		Svensson 17'; Ascone (yellow card) 77'; Engdahl (yellow card) 85'	Referee: Jonas Hansen

31 August 2022	FC Culpa (9)	0–3	FC Roskilde (3)	Valby Idrætspark, Copenhagen
19:00	Michaelsen (yellow card) 87'; Clemmensen (yellow card) 89'; Johnannsen (red card) 90+3'		Wedege (red card) 23'; Etim 70'; Baskaya 73' (pen.); Larsen 84' (pen.); Skøtt (yellow card) 87'Julø (yellow card) 87'	Referee: Jesper Nielsen

31 August 2022	FC Nakskov (6)	0–4	Vanløse IF (4)	OK+ Stadium, Nakskov
19:30			Vinterberg 6'; El-Haddouchi 37'; Lytsen 39'; Pyne-Cole 43'; Dara (yellow card) 62'	Referee: Patrick Stenzel Rasmussen

6 September 2022	BSF (6)	1–0	Karlslunde IF (5)	Ballerup Idrætspark
18:30	Vilberg 82'		Christensen (yellow card) 44'; Andersen (yellow card) 47'; Jensen (yellow card) 59'

7 September 2022	Nykøbing FC (2)	1–1 (a.e.t.) (3–2 p)	OB (1)	Lollands Bank Park, Nykøbing Falster
18:30	Nnamani (yellow card) 53'; Christiansson (yellow card) 73'; Hassan 105'		Grubbe (yellow card) 2'; Breum (yellow card) 52'; Tongya (yellow card) 79'; Okosun 116'	Attendance: 1,450

== Third round ==
There were 32 teams:

- 26 teams from the 2nd round (winners)
  - Tier 1: Viborg FF, AC Horsens, Nordsjælland, AGF
  - Tier 2: FC Helsingør, Næstved BK, Fremad Amager, HB Køge, Vejle Boldklub, SønderjyskE, Vendsyssel FF, Hobro IK, Nykøbing FC
  - Tier 3: Aarhus Fremad, Thisted FC, AB, Brabrand IF, FC Roskilde
  - Tier 4: Middelfart BK, Ishøj IF, Næsby BK, FA 2000, Vanløse IF
  - Tier 5: None
  - Tier 6: Hørsholm-Usserød IK, Sædding-Guldager IF, BSF
- 6 teams from the 2021–22 Danish Superliga (1st–6th placed)
  - AaB
  - Brøndby
  - Copenhagen
  - Midtjylland
  - Randers
  - Silkeborg

Number of teams per tier still in competition
3F Superliga (tier 1)	NordicBet Liga (tier 2)	2. Division; (tier 3)	3. Division; (tier 4)	Regional-series (tier 6)	Total
10 / 12	9 / 12	5 / 12	5 / 10	3 / 19	32 / 104

28 September 2022	Næstved BK (2)	0–3	Silkeborg (1)	TintShop Park, Næstved
18:00			Helenius 17' (Kusk); Dahl 28' (Sonne); Adamsen 79' (Brink)	Referee: Jonas Hansen

5 October 2022	Sædding-Guldager IF (6)	0–6	Middelfart BK (4)	Guldager Idrætscenter
15:45	Riber (yellow card) 68'		Thomsen 20'; Hayes 22' 61' (Jacobsen); Berthelsen 41' (Hayes) 82'; Fazlagic 50' (pen.)	Referee: Allan Staal

12 October 2022	BSF (6)	0–5	Nordsjælland (1)	Ballerup Idrætspark
15:30	Frandsen (yellow card) 71'		Nygren 23' (Walta) 51' (Walta); Barslund 57' (Dorgeles) 83' (Walta); Antman 68' (Stjopin)	Referee: Jacob Karlsen

12 October 2022	AB (3)	0–3	AGF (1)	Gladsaxe Stadium
18:00	Iheme (yellow card) 30'; Alicino (yellow card) 52'; Hansen (yellow card) 68'		Iheme 2' (o.g.); Grønning (yellow card) 19'; Duin 34' (Hausner); Haugen 76' (Brandhof)	Referee: Simon Rasmussen

18 October 2022	Brabrand IF (3)	0–3	Vejle Boldklub (2)	Brabrand Stadion, Brabrand
15:15	Olesen (yellow card) 62'; Truong (yellow card) 81'; Vesterbæk (yellow card) 81'		Kirkegaard 15' (Gammelgaard); Barry (yellow card) 17'; Gammelgaard 25'; Elvius (yellow card) 58'; Velkov 81' (Muçolli)	Referee: Aydin Uslu

18 October 2022	Næsby BK (4)	1–2	Nykøbing FC (2)	ALPI Arena Næsby, Næsby
15:15	Hother 51'; Dreyer (yellow card) 65'; Harboe (yellow card) 88'		Pleidrup 42'; Jensen (yellow card) 62'; Backmann (yellow card) 70'; Simonsen 84'; Kjerrumgaard (yellow card) 88'	Referee: Jonas Bæk

18 October 2022	HB Køge (2)	1–4	SønderjyskE (2)	Køge Idrætspark
18:00	Adedeji 69'		Emini 17' (yellow card) 33'; Gallegos 36', 46'; Ladefoged 85' (pen.); Jessen (yellow card) 88'	Referee: Anders Voergaard

18 October 2022	FC Roskilde (3)	1–2	Fremad Amager (2)	Roskilde Idrætspark
18:00	Noer (yellow card) 68'; Julø 90+5'		Johansson 1' (Bonnesen); Boateng 41'; Haahr (yellow card) 51'	Referee: Simon Rasmussen

18 October 2022	Vanløse IF (4)	1–3 (a.e.t.)	AaB (1)	Vanløse Idrætspark, Vanløse
18:00	Qvarnstrøm (yellow card) 21'; Lytsen 26'; Krogh (yellow card) 103' (yellow-red card)		Otoa (yellow card) 25'; Sousa 75' (pen.) 113' (pen.); Ferreira (yellow card) 96'; Ramkilde 103' (Andersen)	Referee: Jonas Hansen

18 October 2022	Thisted FC (3)	2–1	FC Helsingør (2)	Sparekassen Thy Arena, Thisted
18:00	Bustamante 29' 50' (Lagergaard)		Kawo (yellow card) 28'; Mouritsen 64'	Referee: Morten Krogh

19 October 2022	Aarhus Fremad (3)	4–0	Brøndby (1)	Riisvangen Stadium, Aarhus N
14:45	Mikkelsen 11' (o.g.); Magnus Kirchheiner (yellow card) 26'; Fechtenburg 31'; Andreasen 45+1' (From); Kubel 84' (Marcus Kirchheiner); Rieper (red card) 90+3'		Greve (yellow card) 50'	Referee: Sandi Putros

19 October 2022	Ishøj IF (4)	2–3 (a.e.t.)	Viborg FF (1)	Ishøj Idrætscenter
15:15	Offenberg 16' (Azaquoun); Stückler 91' (Kannah)		Žambůrek (yellow card) 70'; Lauritsen 76'; Bundgaard (yellow card) 89'; Jatta 116' (Leemans); Søndergaard (yellow card) 119'; Leemans 120' (Berger)	Referee: Mads-Kristoffer Kristoffersen

19 October 2022	FA 2000 (4)	0–6	Midtjylland (1)	Frederiksberg Idrætspark
17:00			Kaba 13' (Gartenmann); Evander 20' (pen.) 30' (Sørensen); Gartenmann; Christansen 65' (yellow card) 77'; Chilufya 82'	Referee: Jakob Kelhet

19 October 2022	Hobro IK (2)	1–1 (a.e.t.) (3–5 p)	Copenhagen (1)	DS Arena, Hobro
17:45	Freundlich 4'; Yoda (yellow card) 86'		Khocholava 66' (Sørensen); Lerager (yellow card) 68'; Haraldsson (yellow card) 70' (yellow-red card) 81'; Clem (yellow card) 97'; Diks (yellow card) 111'	Attendance: 3,054; Referee: Jens Maae
	Penalties
	Søgaard (penalty scored); Elkær (penalty scored); Skjellerup (penalty scored); Deedson (penalty missed)		(penalty scored) Claesson; (penalty scored) Daramy; (penalty scored) Kristiansen; (penalty scored) Sørensen; (penalty scored) Diks

19 October 2022	Hørsholm-Usserød IK (6)	1–2	AC Horsens (1)	Hørsholm Idrætspark, Rungsted Kyst
19:00

20 October 2022	Vendsyssel FF (2)	0–2	Randers (1)	Nord Energi Arena, Hjørring
18:00	Jonsson (yellow card) 39'; Bizoza (yellow card) 79'		Odey 27' (Klysner) 43' (Bundgaard); Kopplin (yellow card) 83'	Referee: Mikkel Redder

== Fourth round ==
There was 16 teams from the 3rd round (winners).

- Tier 1: Silkeborg IF, FC Nordsjælland, AGF, AaB, Viborg FF, FC Midtjylland, F.C. Copenhagen, AC Horsens, Randers FC
- Tier 2: Vejle BK, Nykøbing FC, SønderjyskE, Fremad Amager
- Tier 3: Thisted FC, Aarhus Fremad
- Tier 4: Middelfart BK

The draw was held on 21 October 2022.

Number of teams per tier still in competition
3F Superliga (tier 1)	NordicBet Liga (tier 2)	2. Division; (tier 3)	3. Division; (tier 4)	Total
9 / 12	4 / 12	2 / 12	1 / 10	16 / 104

8 November 2022	Nykøbing FC (2)	1–2 (a.e.t.)	SønderjyskE (2)	Lollands Bank Park, Nykøbing Falster
18:00	Jakobsen 15' (Bank); Gehrt (yellow card) 18'; Egeris (yellow card) 53'; Carlson (yellow card) 85'; Ljuti (yellow card) 98'; Toutouh (yellow card) 99'		Frederiksen 9' (Björklund); Ladefoged (yellow card) 73'; Hadžić (yellow card) 79'; Albæk 93' (Gallegos) (yellow card) 96'; Dal Hende (yellow card) 99'; Soulas (yellow card) 109'; Gallegos (yellow card) 116'; Christiansen (yellow card) 120+1'	Attendance: https://uk.soccerway.com/matches/2022/11/08/denmark/dbu-pokalen/lolland-falster-alliancen/sonderjyske/3977482/ Referee: Jakob A. Sundberg

9 November 2022	Middelfart BK (4)	1–2	AaB (1)	Middelfart Stadium, Middelfart
13:30	Kristensen (yellow card) 63'; Berthelsen 90+1'		Allan Sousa 53' (Poulsen) (yellow card) 66'; Høgh (yellow card) 62'; Fossum (yellow card) 78'; Prip 86'	Referee: Jacob Karlsen

9 November 2022	Aarhus Fremad (3)	3–1	Fremad Amager (2)	Riisvangen Stadium, Aarhus
13:30	Allen 17' (o.g.); Kubel 19' (Hauge); Andreasen 28' (Hauge)		Friedrich 21' (Lumb); Aaquist (red card) 43'; Bay (yellow card) 80'	Referee: Aydin Uslu

9 November 2022	Vejle BK (2)	1–0	AC Horsens (1)	Vejle Stadium, Vejle
17:30	Emmanouilidis (yellow card) 51'; Drammeh 70' (yellow card) 90+3'; Trott (yellow card) 81'

9 November 2022	Thisted FC(2)	1–3 (a.e.t.)	F.C. Copenhagen(1)	Thisted
18:00	Hansen 38'		Óskarsson 21' (Sørensen); Vavro (yellow card) 45+1'; Cornelius 99' (Sørensen) 103' (Sørensen)	Stadium: Sparekassen Thy Arena; Attendance: 3,742; Referee: Jakob Kehlet

9 November 2022	Randers FC (1)	1–3	Silkeborg IF (1)	Cepheus Park Randers, Randers
19:30	Andersson 38' (Graves Jensen); Enggård (yellow card) 89'		Sonne 53' (Klitten); Tengstedt 68' (Klynge) 80' (Þórðarson)

10 November 2022	Viborg FF (1)	3–1	FC Midtjylland (1)	Energi Viborg Arena, Viborg
17:30	Søndergaard 14'; Bürgy 19'; Said 36' (Achouri); Jatta (yellow card) 90+2'		Olsson (yellow card) 38'; Isaksen 53' (Dreyer); Sviatchenko (yellow card) 90'

10 November 2022	AGF (1)	0–2	FC Nordsjælland (1)	Ceres Park, Aarhus
19:30	Madsen (yellow card) 40'		Diomande 29' (Nagalo); Nygren

== Quarter-finals ==
There will be 8 teams from the 4th round (winners) playing two legs:

- Tier 1: AaB, F.C. Copenhagen, Silkeborg IF, Viborg FF, FC Nordsjælland
- Tier 2: SønderjyskE, Vejle BK
- Tier 3: Aarhus Fremad

Number of teams per tier still in competition
3F Superliga (tier 1)	NordicBet Liga (tier 2)	2. Division; (tier 3)	Total
5 / 12	2 / 12	1 / 12	8 / 104

28 February 2023	Aarhus Fremad (3)	0–3	FC Nordsjælland (1)	Silkeborg
18:30	E. Hauge (yellow card) 16'; Kirchheiner (yellow card) 33'; Letort (yellow card) 8'	Report	M. Hansen 11'; Nuamah 17' (pen.), 34'	Stadium: JYSK Park, Referee: Jens Maae

5 April 2023	FC Nordsjælland (1)	4–1 (7–1 agg.)	Aarhus Fremad (3)	Farum
18:00	Coulibaly 24' (Frese); Hansen 39' (Coulibaly); Frese 64' (Coulibaly); Ascone 79' (Coulibaly)		Buch 58' (Rizvic)	Stadium: Right to Dream Park; Referee: Jakob Kehlet

1 March 2023	F.C. Copenhagen (1)	2–0	Vejle BK (2)	Copenhagen
20:00 CET	Khocholava (yellow card) 55'; Vavro (yellow card) 67'; Daramy 68' (Vavro) (yellow card) 90+10'; Ankersen (yellow card) 90+7'; Claesson 90+8' (Haraldsson)	FCK Summary	Drammeh (yellow card) 35'; Albentosa (yellow card) 45+2'; Provstgaard (yellow card) 67'	Stadium: Parken; Attendance: 17,433; Referee: Peter Kjærsgaard

6 April 2023	Vejle BK (2)	0–0 (2–0 agg.)	F.C. Copenhagen (1)	Vejle
19:30	Albentosa (yellow card) 43'; Elvius (yellow card) 56'; Ezatolahi (yellow card) 90+5'			Stadium: Vejle Stadium; Attendance: 10,021; Referee: Mikkel Redder

2 March 2023	AaB (1)	2–0	Viborg FF (1)	Aalborg
18:00	Prip 51' (Helenius), 55' (Fossum)	Report		Stadium: Aalborg Portland Park; Attendance: 5,208; Referee: Morten Krogh

6 April 2023	Viborg FF (1)	1–0 (2–1 agg.)	AaB (1)	Viborg
15:00	Júnior (yellow card) 26'; Gaaei 40' (Grønning) (yellow card) 73'		Granli (yellow card) 65'; Sousa (yellow card) 79'; Bakiz (yellow card) 90+2'	Stadium: Viborg Stadium; Referee: Mads-Kristoffer Kristoffersen

8 March 2023	SønderjyskE (2)	0–2	Silkeborg IF (1)	Haderslev
18:45	Albæk (yellow card) 50'	Report	Tengstedt 24' (Þórðarson); Busch (yellow card) 35'; Adamsen 54' (Sonne)	Stadium: Sydbank Park; Referee: Jørgen Daugbjerg Burchardt

6 April 2023	Silkeborg IF (1)	3–2 (5–2 agg.)	SønderjyskE (2)	Silkeborg
17:00	Dal Hende 52' (o.g.); Tengstedt 66' (Adamsen); Busch 69' (Jørgensen)		Óskarsson 30' (Gallegos); Sonne 34' (o.g.)	Stadium: JYSK Park; Referee: Aydin Uslu

== Semi-finals ==
There will be 4 teams, all from the Danish Superliga advancing from the Quarter-final (winners) playing two legs:

25 April 2023	Silkeborg IF (1)	1–1	AaB (1)	Silkeborg
19:00	Busch 86' (Kusk)	Report	Sousa 63' (yellow card) 68'; Pallesen (yellow card) 70'	Stadium: JYSK Park; Attendance: 3,751; Referee: Jacob Karlsen

4 May 2023	AaB (1)	4–1 (5–2 agg.)	Silkeborg IF (1)	Aalborg
17:30	Helenius 19' (Ludewig); Allan Sousa (yellow card) 21' (goal) 90+5'; Bakiz 23' (Fossum); Ludewig (yellow card) 37'; Andersen 80'; Højholt (yellow card) 86'	Report	Adamsen 16' (Þórðarson); Klynge (yellow card) 45+1'; Þórðarson (yellow card) 51'; Sonne (yellow card) 68'; Salquiest (yellow card) 79'	Stadium: Aalborg Portland Park; Attendance: 7,398; Referee: Sandi Putros

26 April 2023	FC Nordsjælland (1)	3–2	F.C. Copenhagen (1)	Farum
18:00	Hansen 7' (Ascone); Bidstrup (yellow card) 52'; Nagalo 75' (Hansen); Marcondes 90+1' (pen.)	Report	Jóhannesson (yellow card) 38'; Gonçalves 65'; Larsson 71' (Gonçalves)	Stadium: Right to Dream Park; Attendance: 6,440; Referee: Jens Maae

4 May 2023	F.C. Copenhagen (1)	5–3 (7–6 agg.)	FC Nordsjælland (1)	Copenhagen
19:30	Claesson 7' (Daramy) 16'; Lund (yellow card) 11'; Larsson 21' (Claesson); Vavro 62' (Sørensen); Sørensen (yellow card) 69'; Gonçalves 78' (pen.); Haraldsson (yellow card) 90+3'	Report	Nuamah 13' (pen.); Nagalo (yellow card) 43'; Christensen (yellow card) 52' (goal) 66' (Nygren); Faghir 71' (Christensen)	Stadium: Parken; Attendance: 25,255; Referee: Jakob Kehlet

== Final ==
There will be 2 teams from the Semi-final (winners). The winner will qualify for the Europa Conference League second qualifying round

18 May 2023
17:00
Final

AaB (1)	0–1	Copenhagen (1)
Jørgensen (yellow card) 49'; Thelander (yellow card) 79'; Ementa (yellow card) 90+3'	Report	Gonçalves 48'; Jelert (yellow card) 82'; Haraldsson (yellow card) 86'; Grabara (yellow card) 90+3'; Claesson (yellow card) 90+6'

Parken, Copenhagen
Attendance: 34,937
Referee: Jakob A. Sundberg
