= 2022 FIFA World Cup qualification – CONCACAF first round =

The first round of CONCACAF matches for 2022 FIFA World Cup qualification was played in March and June 2021.

== Format ==
A total of 30 teams (CONCACAF teams ranked 6 to 35 based on the FIFA rankings of July 2020) were divided into six groups of five teams each. In each group, teams played against each other once in a single round-robin format, for a total of four matches per team (two home and two away). The top team of each of the six groups advanced to the second round.

== Seeding ==
The draw for the first round was held, along with the draw for the third round, on 19 August 2020, 19:00 CEST (UTC+2), at the FIFA headquarters in Zürich, Switzerland.

The seeding was based on the FIFA World Rankings of July 2020 (shown in parentheses). Teams in Pot 1 were pre-seeded to positions A1 to F1 based on their ranking (A1 as the highest-ranked team in Pot 1, and F1 as the lowest-ranked in Pot 1). The remaining teams were drawn by pot into the first available group alphabetically. Each team was assigned the position in their group based on their pot number (Pot 2 was placed in position 2, Pot 3 was placed in position 3).

Note: Bolded teams qualified for the second round.

Pot 1	Pot 2	Pot 3	Pot 4	Pot 5
1. **El Salvador** (69); 2. **Canada** (73); 3. **Curaçao** (80); 4. **Panama** (81); 5. **Haiti** (86); 6. Trinidad and Tobago (105)	7. Antigua and Barbuda (126); 8. Guatemala (130); 9. **Saint Kitts and Nevis** (139); 10. Suriname (141); 11. Nicaragua (151); 12. Dominican Republic (158)	13. Grenada (159); 14. Barbados (162); 15. Guyana (166); 16. Saint Vincent and the Grenadines (167); 17. Bermuda (168); 18. Belize (170)	19. Saint Lucia (176) (Note: Saint Lucia were drawn into Group E in the first round, but later withdrew before their first match.); 20. Puerto Rico (178); 21. Cuba (179); 22. Montserrat (183); 23. Dominica (184); 24. Cayman Islands (193)	25. Bahamas (195); 26. Aruba (200); 27. Turks and Caicos Islands (203); 28. U.S. Virgin Islands (207); 29. British Virgin Islands (208); 30. Anguilla (210)

== Schedule ==
The matches were originally scheduled for 7–13 October and 11–17 November 2020. However, CONCACAF announced on 8 September 2020 that the matches would be postponed, and would not begin until March 2021. The schedule for the March 2021 matches was announced on 26 February 2021. Due to the COVID-19 pandemic in North America and related quarantine and travel restrictions in certain countries, some matches took place at neutral venues.

Match	Original date	Revised date
2 v 4	7 October 2020	24 March 2021
1 v 3	8 October 2020	25 March 2021
5 v 2	10 October 2020	27 March 2021
4 v 1	11 October 2020	28–29 March 2021
3 v 5	13 October 2020	30 March 2021
4 v 5	11 November 2020	2 June 2021
2 v 3	13 November 2020	4 June 2021
5 v 1	14 November 2020	5 June 2021
3 v 4	17 November 2020	8 June 2021
1 v 2	17 November 2020	8 June 2021

== Groups ==
=== Group A ===
Pos	Team	Pld	W	D	L	GF	GA	GD	Pts	Qualification	El Salvador	Montserrat	Antigua and Barbuda	Grenada	United States Virgin Islands
1	El Salvador	4	3	1	0	13	1	+12	10	Advance to second round	—	—	3–0	2–0	—
2	Montserrat	4	2	2	0	9	4	+5	8		1–1	—	—	—	4–0
3	Antigua and Barbuda	4	2	1	1	6	5	+1	7		—	2–2	—	1–0	—
4	Grenada	4	1	0	3	2	5	−3	3		—	1–2	—	—	1–0
5	U.S. Virgin Islands	4	0	0	4	0	15	−15	0		0–7	—	0–3	—	—

Source: FIFA
Rules for classification: Tiebreakers
24 March 2021
18:00 UTC−4

Antigua and Barbuda	2–2	Montserrat
Kirwan 23'; Bishop 45'	Report	L. Taylor 7' (pen.), 26'

Ergilio Hato Stadium, Willemstad (Curaçao)
Attendance: 0
Referee: Melvin Matamoros (Honduras)
25 March 2021
20:25 UTC−6

El Salvador	2–0	Grenada
Mayen 23'; Rugamas 46'	Report

Estadio Cuscatlán, San Salvador
Attendance: 250
Referee: Kimbell Ward (Saint Kitts and Nevis)

27 March 2021
19:00 UTC−4

U.S. Virgin Islands	0–3	Antigua and Barbuda
	Report	Byers 26'; Griffith 34' (pen.), 42'

Bethlehem Soccer Stadium, Upper Bethlehem
Attendance: 0
Referee: Trevester Richards (Saint Kitts and Nevis)
28 March 2021
19:00 UTC−4

Montserrat	1–1	El Salvador
L. Taylor 89'	Report	Rugamas 4'

Ergilio Hato Stadium, Willemstad (Curaçao)
Attendance: 0
Referee: Ricangel de Leça (Aruba)

30 March 2021
19:00 UTC−4

Grenada	1–0	U.S. Virgin Islands
Lewis 33'	Report

Kirani James Athletic Stadium, St. George's
Attendance: 0
Referee: Sherwin Johnson (Guyana)

2 June 2021
17:00 UTC−4

Montserrat	4–0	U.S. Virgin Islands
Pond 39'; Ince 60'; Clifton 66', 83'	Report

Estadio Panamericano, San Cristóbal (Dominican Republic)
Attendance: 0
Referee: Selvin Brown (Honduras)

4 June 2021
16:00 UTC−4

Antigua and Barbuda	1–0	Grenada
Browne 20'	Report

Sir Vivian Richards Stadium, North Sound
Attendance: 400
Referee: Francia González (Mexico)
5 June 2021
19:00 UTC−4

U.S. Virgin Islands	0–7	El Salvador
	Report	Monterrosa 23', 86'; J. Portillo 30'; Rugamas 78', 82', 90'; Pérez 79'

Bethlehem Soccer Stadium, Upper Bethlehem
Attendance: 150
Referee: Ted Unkel (United States)

8 June 2021
19:00 UTC−4

Grenada	1–2	Montserrat
Lewis 51'	Report	L. Taylor 85', 87' (pen.)

Kirani James Athletic Stadium, St. George's
Attendance: 50
Referee: Adonai Escobedo (Mexico)
8 June 2021
19:05 UTC−6

El Salvador	3–0	Antigua and Barbuda
Zavaleta 40'; Rugamas 68'; Martinez 85'	Report

Estadio Cuscatlán, San Salvador
Attendance: 150
Referee: Keylor Herrera (Costa Rica)

=== Group B ===
Pos	Team	Pld	W	D	L	GF	GA	GD	Pts	Qualification	Canada	Suriname	Bermuda	Aruba	Cayman Islands
1	Canada	4	4	0	0	27	1	+26	12	Advance to second round	—	4–0	5–1	—	—
2	Suriname	4	3	0	1	15	4	+11	9		—	—	6–0	—	3–0
3	Bermuda	4	1	1	2	7	12	−5	4		—	—	—	5–0	1–1
4	Aruba	4	1	0	3	3	19	−16	3		0–7	0–6	—	—	—
5	Cayman Islands	4	0	1	3	2	18	−16	1		0–11	—	—	1–3	—

Source: FIFA
Rules for classification: Tiebreakers
24 March 2021
19:00 UTC−3

Suriname	3–0	Cayman Islands
Pinas 22'; Donk 38' (pen.); G. Vlijter 76'	Report

Dr. Ir. Franklin Essed Stadion, Paramaribo
Attendance: 500
Referee: Jorge Pérez (Mexico)
25 March 2021
20:00 UTC−4

Canada	5–1	Bermuda
Larin 19', 27', 69'; Laryea 53'; Corbeanu 81'	Report	Crichlow 63'

Exploria Stadium, Orlando (United States)
Attendance: 0
Referee: Armando Villarreal (United States)

27 March 2021
20:00 UTC−4

Aruba	0–6	Suriname
	Report	Hasselbaink 19', 37', 55'; Croes 27' (o.g.); Jozefzoon 70'; Alberg 74'

IMG Academy, Bradenton (United States)
Attendance: 0
Referee: Ismail Elfath (United States)
29 March 2021 (Note: The Cayman Islands vs Canada match, originally to be played at 16:00 UTC−4, 28 March 2021, was postponed because the Cayman team could not provide their negative COVID-19 tests to FIFA.)
18:00 UTC−4

Cayman Islands	0–11	Canada
	Report	Sturing 6'; Larin 13'; Wotherspoon 25'; Davies 27' (pen.), 73'; Kaye 32', 63'; Johnston 44'; Cavallini 68', 74', 76'

IMG Academy, Bradenton (United States)
Attendance: 0
Referee: Ted Unkel (United States)

30 March 2021
20:00 UTC−4

Bermuda	5–0	Aruba
Crichlow 36', 80'; Bather 40'; Leverock 57'; Scott 64'	Report

IMG Academy, Bradenton (United States)
Attendance: 29
Referee: Jaime Herrera (El Salvador)

2 June 2021
18:00 UTC−4

Cayman Islands	1–3	Aruba
J. Ebanks 30' (pen.)	Report	John 40', 75'; Groothusen 45+2'

IMG Academy, Bradenton (United States)
Referee: Luis Enrique Santander (Mexico)

4 June 2021
19:00 UTC−3

Suriname	6–0	Bermuda
Becker 3', 36'; Hasselbaink 15', 37', 65'; Pinas 74'	Report

Dr. Ir. Franklin Essed Stadion, Paramaribo
Attendance: 0
Referee: Mario Escobar (Guatemala)
5 June 2021
20:00 UTC−4

Aruba	0–7	Canada
	Report	Cavallini 17', 45+2'; Hoilett 20' (pen.); Brault-Guillard 49'; Davies 78'; Larin 87'; David 89'

IMG Academy, Bradenton (United States)
Attendance: 45
Referee: Marco Ortíz (Mexico)

8 June 2021
21:05 UTC−4 (Note: The Bermuda v Cayman Islands match, originally to be played at 20:00 UTC-4, was delayed by 65 minutes due to lightning in the area.)

Bermuda	1–1	Cayman Islands
Hall 65'	Report	M. Ebanks 23'

IMG Academy, Bradenton (United States)
Attendance: 22
Referee: Rubiel Vazquez (United States)
8 June 2021
20:05 UTC−5

Canada	4–0	Suriname
Davies 37'; David 59', 73', 77' (pen.)	Report

SeatGeek Stadium, Bridgeview (United States)
Attendance: 0
Referee: Nima Saghafi (United States)

=== Group C ===
Pos	Team	Pld	W	D	L	GF	GA	GD	Pts	Qualification	Curaçao	Guatemala	Cuba	Saint Vincent and the Grenadines	British Virgin Islands
1	Curaçao	4	3	1	0	15	1	+14	10	Advance to second round	—	0–0	—	5–0	—
2	Guatemala	4	3	1	0	14	0	+14	10		—	—	1–0	10–0	—
3	Cuba	4	2	0	2	7	3	+4	6		1–2	—	—	—	5–0
4	Saint Vincent and the Grenadines	4	1	0	3	3	16	−13	3		—	—	0–1	—	3–0
5	British Virgin Islands	4	0	0	4	0	19	−19	0		0–8	0–3	—	—	—

Source: FIFA
Rules for classification: Tiebreakers
24 March 2021
18:00 UTC−6

Guatemala	1–0	Cuba
L. Martínez 59'	Report

Estadio Doroteo Guamuch Flores, Guatemala City
Attendance: 0
Referee: Benjamín Pineda (Costa Rica)
25 March 2021
18:00 UTC−4

Curaçao	5–0	Saint Vincent and the Grenadines
J. Bacuna 1', 35'; Van den Hurk 17'; Antonia 45'; Hooi 87'	Report

Ergilio Hato Stadium, Willemstad
Attendance: 0
Referee: Ricangel de Leça (Aruba)

27 March 2021
18:00 UTC−4

British Virgin Islands	0–3	Guatemala
	Report	Lom 21'; Hernández 44'; Betancourth 81'

Ergilio Hato Stadium, Willemstad (Curaçao)
Attendance: 0
Referee: Oscar Moncada (Honduras)
28 March 2021
15:00 UTC−6

Cuba	1–2	Curaçao
O. Hernández 27'	Report	L. Bacuna 11'; Benschop 44'

Estadio Doroteo Guamuch Flores, Guatemala City (Guatemala)
Attendance: 0
Referee: Germán Martínez (El Salvador)

30 March 2021
18:00 UTC−4

Saint Vincent and the Grenadines	3–0	British Virgin Islands
Anderson 10'; Sam 20'; Solomon 86'	Report

Ergilio Hato Stadium, Willemstad (Curaçao)
Attendance: 0
Referee: Henry Bejarano (Costa Rica)

2 June 2021
15:30 UTC−6

Cuba	5–0	British Virgin Islands
Paradela 33'; O. Hernández 68'; M. Reyes 76'; Cavafe 80'; D. Reyes 90+1'	Report

Estadio Doroteo Guamuch Flores, Guatemala City (Guatemala)
Attendance: 0
Referee: José Torres (Puerto Rico)

4 June 2021
16:00 UTC−6

Guatemala	10–0	Saint Vincent and the Grenadines
Lom 2'; Barrientos 12'; Santis 16'; Hernández 33' (pen.); Gordillo 41'; L. Martínez 52'; Betancourth 66'; Ceballos 79' (pen.); Vargas 85'; Méndez 89'	Report

Estadio Doroteo Guamuch Flores, Guatemala City
Attendance: 0
Referee: Erick Lezama (Nicaragua)
5 June 2021
15:00 UTC−6

British Virgin Islands	0–8	Curaçao
	Report	Kuwas 7'; Maria 9', 27'; L. Bacuna 11'; Benschop 18' (pen.), 22'; Gorré 57', 90+1'

Estadio El Trébol, Guatemala City (Guatemala)
Attendance: 0
Referee: William Anderson (Puerto Rico)

8 June 2021
16:00 UTC−4

Saint Vincent and the Grenadines	0–1	Cuba
	Report	M. Reyes 64'

Kirani James Athletic Stadium, St. George's (Grenada)
Attendance: 50
Referee: Fernando Guerrero (Mexico)
8 June 2021
20:00 UTC−4

Curaçao	0–0	Guatemala
	Report

Ergilio Hato Stadium, Willemstad
Attendance: 3,000
Referee: Armando Villarreal (United States)

=== Group D ===
Pos	Team	Pld	W	D	L	GF	GA	GD	Pts	Qualification	Panama	Dominican Republic	Barbados	Dominica	Anguilla
1	Panama	4	4	0	0	19	1	+18	12	Advance to second round	—	3–0	1–0	—	—
2	Dominican Republic	4	2	1	1	8	4	+4	7		—	—	1–1	1–0	—
3	Barbados	4	1	2	1	3	3	0	5		—	—	—	1–1	1–0
4	Dominica	4	1	1	2	5	4	+1	4		1–2	—	—	—	3–0
5	Anguilla	4	0	0	4	0	23	−23	0		0–13	0–6	—	—	—

Source: FIFA
Rules for classification: Tiebreakers
24 March 2021
19:00 UTC−4

Dominican Republic	1–0	Dominica
F. Núñez 52'	Report

Félix Sánchez Olympic Stadium, Santo Domingo
Referee: William Anderson (Puerto Rico)
25 March 2021
20:00 UTC−4

Panama	1–0	Barbados
Catuy 82'	Report

Félix Sánchez Olympic Stadium, Santo Domingo (Dominican Republic)
Referee: Nima Saghafi (United States)

27 March 2021
18:00 UTC−4

Anguilla	0–6	Dominican Republic
	Report	Romero 22' (pen.), 27'; Lorenzo 25', 46'; Peralta 66'; Espinal 75'

Inter Miami CF Stadium, Fort Lauderdale (United States)
Referee: Rubiel Vazquez (United States)
28 March 2021
16:00 UTC−4

Dominica	1–2	Panama
Laville 82'	Report	Thomas 28' (o.g.); Fajardo 85'

Félix Sánchez Olympic Stadium, Santo Domingo (Dominican Republic)
Attendance: 1,500
Referee: Marco Ortíz (Mexico)

30 March 2021
19:30 UTC−4

Barbados	1–0	Anguilla
Saimovici 81'	Report

Félix Sánchez Olympic Stadium, Santo Domingo (Dominican Republic)
Attendance: 0
Referee: Diego Montaño (Mexico)

2 June 2021
15:00 UTC−4

Dominica	3–0	Anguilla
Thomas 3'; C. Bertrand 34'; Wade 42'	Report

Félix Sánchez Olympic Stadium, Santo Domingo (Dominican Republic)
Attendance: 0
Referee: Kimbell Ward (Saint Kitts and Nevis)

4 June 2021
19:00 UTC−4

Dominican Republic	1–1	Barbados
Rodríguez 90+2'	Report	Reid-Stephen 42'

Félix Sánchez Olympic Stadium, Santo Domingo
Attendance: 0
Referee: Germán Martínez (El Salvador)
5 June 2021
19:00 UTC−5

Anguilla	0–13	Panama
	Report	Cooper 7'; Waterman 18', 50'; Aguilar 31'; Torres 35' (pen.), 53', 70', 83' (pen.); Smith 48' (o.g.); Camargo 58'; Catuy 73'; Quintero 84'; Palacios 90'

Estadio Nacional Rod Carew, Panama City (Panama)
Attendance: 5,000
Referee: Sergio Reyna (Guatemala)

8 June 2021
19:00 UTC−4

Barbados	1–1	Dominica
Saimovici 48'	Report	Wade 57'

Félix Sánchez Olympic Stadium, Santo Domingo (Dominican Republic)
Attendance: 0
Referee: Jaime Herrera (El Salvador)
8 June 2021
20:00 UTC−5

Panama	3–0	Dominican Republic
Godoy 8'; Bárcenas 67'; Waterman 86'	Report

Estadio Nacional Rod Carew, Panama City
Attendance: 5,674
Referee: Walter López (Guatemala)

=== Group E ===
Pos	Team	Pld	W	D	L	GF	GA	GD	Pts	Qualification	Haiti	Nicaragua	Belize	Turks and Caicos Islands	Saint Lucia
1	Haiti	3	3	0	0	13	0	+13	9	Advance to second round	—	1–0	2–0	—	—
2	Nicaragua	3	2	0	1	10	1	+9	6		—	—	3–0	—	—
3	Belize	3	1	0	2	5	5	0	3		—	—	—	5–0	—
4	Turks and Caicos Islands	3	0	0	3	0	22	−22	0		0–10	0–7	—	—	—
5	Saint Lucia	0	0	0	0	0	0	0	0	Withdrew	—	—	—	—	—

Source: FIFA
Rules for classification: Tiebreakers

Saint Lucia withdrew before playing.

25 March 2021
17:00 UTC−4

Haiti	2–0	Belize
Adé 50'; Séance 81'	Report

Stade Sylvio Cator, Port-au-Prince
Attendance: 300
Referee: Walter López (Guatemala)
27 March 2021
16:30 UTC−4

Turks and Caicos Islands	0–7	Nicaragua
	Report	Barrera 3', 59'; Smith 8', 45+2'; Fletes 46'; Forbes 78'; Moldskred 87'

Estadio Panamericano, San Cristóbal (Dominican Republic)
Referee: William Anderson (Puerto Rico)

30 March 2021
17:00 UTC−4

Belize	5–0	Turks and Caicos Islands
Bernárdez 45+3', 48'; August 47'; Nembhard 81'; McCaulay 90+1'	Report

Estadio Panamericano, San Cristóbal (Dominican Republic)
Attendance: 0
Referee: Nima Saghafi (United States)

4 June 2021
19:00 UTC−6

Nicaragua	3–0	Belize
Rodríguez 25'; Bonilla 46'; Barrera 51'	Report

Estadio Nacional de Fútbol, Managua
Attendance: 13,000
Referee: Nelson Salgado (Honduras)
5 June 2021
15:00 UTC−3

Turks and Caicos Islands	0–10	Haiti
	Report	Nazon 27', 30', 34', 37'; Antoine 42', 53', 83'; Pierrot 75', 87', 90+2'

TCIFA National Academy, Providenciales
Attendance: 0
Referee: Diego Montaño (Mexico)

8 June 2021
17:00 UTC−4

Haiti	1–0	Nicaragua
Etienne 63'	Report

Stade Sylvio Cator, Port-au-Prince
Attendance: 0
Referee: Kevin Morrison (Jamaica)

=== Group F ===
Pos	Team	Pld	W	D	L	GF	GA	GD	Pts	Qualification	Saint Kitts and Nevis	Trinidad and Tobago	Puerto Rico	Guyana	Bahamas
1	Saint Kitts and Nevis	4	3	0	1	8	2	+6	9	Advance to second round	—	—	1–0	3–0	—
2	Trinidad and Tobago	4	2	2	0	6	1	+5	8		2–0	—	—	3–0	—
3	Puerto Rico	4	2	1	1	10	2	+8	7		—	1–1	—	—	7–0
4	Guyana	4	1	0	3	4	8	−4	3		—	—	0–2	—	4–0
5	Bahamas	4	0	1	3	0	15	−15	1		0–4	0–0	—	—	—

Source: FIFA
Rules for classification: Tiebreakers
24 March 2021
16:00 UTC−4

Saint Kitts and Nevis	1–0	Puerto Rico
Nelson 42'	Report

Estadio Panamericano, San Cristóbal (Dominican Republic)
Referee: Randy Encarnación (Dominican Republic)
25 March 2021
19:00 UTC−4

Trinidad and Tobago	3–0	Guyana
L. García 7'; Bateau 15'; Telfer 44'	Report

Estadio Panamericano, San Cristóbal (Dominican Republic)
Attendance: 70
Referee: Marco Ortíz (Mexico)

27 March 2021
19:00 UTC−4

Bahamas	0–4	Saint Kitts and Nevis
	Report	Freeman 25', 65'; Liburd 53' (pen.); Sterling-James 82'

Thomas Robinson Stadium, Nassau
Referee: Óscar Macías (Mexico)
28 March 2021
17:00 UTC−4

Puerto Rico	1–1	Trinidad and Tobago
R. Rivera 72'	Report	Jones 54'

Mayagüez Athletics Stadium, Mayagüez
Attendance: 0
Referee: Adonai Escobedo (Mexico)

30 March 2021
15:00 UTC−4

Guyana	4–0	Bahamas
Vancooten 8'; Daniel 54'; Glasgow 75'; Welshman 81'	Report

Félix Sánchez Olympic Stadium, Santo Domingo (Dominican Republic)
Attendance: 0
Referee: Sergio Reyna (Guatemala)

2 June 2021
19:30 UTC−4

Puerto Rico	7–0	Bahamas
Díaz 3'; R. Rivera 13', 43' (pen.); Angking 31'; Vega 62'; Servania 66'; Hayes 90+2'	Report

Mayagüez Athletics Stadium, Mayagüez
Attendance: 1,115
Referee: Tori Penso (United States)

4 June 2021
16:00 UTC−4

Saint Kitts and Nevis	3–0	Guyana
Freeman 9' (pen.), 36'; Sawyers 67'	Report

Warner Park, Basseterre
Attendance: 0
Referee: Ricangel de Leça (Aruba)
5 June 2021
17:00 UTC−4

Bahamas	0–0	Trinidad and Tobago
	Report

Thomas Robinson Stadium, Nassau
Attendance: 0
Referee: Oliver Vergara (Panama)

8 June 2021
16:00 UTC−4

Guyana	0–2	Puerto Rico
	Report	R. Rivera 12'; Angking 25' (pen.)

Warner Park, Basseterre (Saint Kitts and Nevis)
Attendance: 0
Referee: Ismael Cornejo (El Salvador)
8 June 2021
17:00 UTC−4

Trinidad and Tobago	2–0	Saint Kitts and Nevis
Muckette 36'; Hyland 74'	Report

Félix Sánchez Olympic Stadium, Santo Domingo (Dominican Republic)
Attendance: 0
Referee: Randy Encarnación (Dominican Republic)

== Goalscorers ==
There were 214 goals scored in 56 matches, for an average of 3.82 goals per match.

6 goals

- (El Salvador national football team) David Rugamas
- (Suriname national football team) Nigel Hasselbaink

5 goals

- (Canada men's national soccer team) Lucas Cavallini
- (Canada men's national soccer team) Cyle Larin
- (Montserrat national football team) Lyle Taylor

4 goals

- (Canada men's national soccer team) Jonathan David
- (Canada men's national soccer team) Alphonso Davies
- (Haiti national football team) Duckens Nazon
- (Panama national football team) Gabriel Torres
- (Puerto Rico national football team) Ricardo Rivera
- (Saint Kitts and Nevis national football team) Keithroy Freeman

3 goals

- (Bermuda national football team) Kane Crichlow
- (Curaçao national football team) Charlison Benschop
- (Haiti national football team) Carnejy Antoine
- (Haiti national football team) Frantzdy Pierrot
- (Nicaragua national football team) Juan Barrera
- (Panama national football team) Cecilio Waterman

2 goals

- (Antigua and Barbuda national football team) Quinton Griffith
- (Aruba national football team) Joshua John
- (Barbados national football team) Emile Saimovici
- (Belize national football team) Carlos Bernárdez
- (Canada men's national soccer team) Mark-Anthony Kaye
- (Cuba national football team) Onel Hernández
- (Cuba national football team) Maikel Reyes
- (Curaçao national football team) Juninho Bacuna
- (Curaçao national football team) Leandro Bacuna
- (Curaçao national football team) Kenji Gorré
- (Curaçao national football team) Michaël Maria
- (Dominica national football team) Julian Wade
- (Dominican Republic national football team) Nowend Lorenzo
- (Dominican Republic national football team) Dorny Romero
- (El Salvador national football team) Marvin Monterroza
- (Grenada national football team) Saydrel Lewis
- (Guatemala national football team) Robin Betancourth
- (Guatemala national football team) Moisés Hernández
- (Guatemala national football team) Darwin Lom
- (Guatemala national football team) Luis Martínez
- (Montserrat national football team) Adrian Clifton
- (Nicaragua national football team) Ariagner Smith
- (Panama national football team) Jair Catuy
- (Puerto Rico national football team) Isaac Angking
- (Suriname national football team) Sheraldo Becker
- (Suriname national football team) Shaquille Pinas

1 goal

- (Antigua and Barbuda national football team) D'Andre Bishop
- (Antigua and Barbuda national football team) Rhys Browne
- (Antigua and Barbuda national football team) Peter Byers
- (Antigua and Barbuda national football team) Eugene Kirwan
- (Aruba national football team) Terence Groothusen
- (Barbados national football team) Niall Reid-Stephen
- (Belize national football team) Jesse August
- (Belize national football team) Deon McCaulay
- (Belize national football team) Deshawon Nembhard
- (Bermuda national football team) Jaylon Bather
- (Bermuda national football team) Kole Hall
- (Bermuda national football team) Dante Leverock
- (Bermuda national football team) Knory Scott
- (Canada men's national soccer team) Zachary Brault-Guillard
- (Canada men's national soccer team) Theo Corbeanu
- (Canada men's national soccer team) Junior Hoilett
- (Canada men's national soccer team) Alistair Johnston
- (Canada men's national soccer team) Richie Laryea
- (Canada men's national soccer team) Frank Sturing
- (Canada men's national soccer team) David Wotherspoon
- (Cayman Islands national football team) Jonah Ebanks
- (Cayman Islands national football team) Mark Ebanks
- (Cuba national football team) Cavafe
- (Cuba national football team) Luis Paradela
- (Cuba national football team) Dairon Reyes
- (Curaçao national football team) Jarchinio Antonia
- (Curaçao national football team) Elson Hooi
- (Curaçao national football team) Anthony van den Hurk
- (Curaçao national football team) Brandley Kuwas
- (Dominica national football team) Chad Bertrand
- (Dominica national football team) Audel Laville
- (Dominica national football team) Briel Thomas
- (Dominican Republic national football team) Luis Espinal
- (Dominican Republic national football team) Fran Núñez
- (Dominican Republic national football team) Domingo Peralta
- (Dominican Republic national football team) Manny Rodríguez
- (El Salvador national football team) Walmer Martinez
- (El Salvador national football team) Gerson Mayen
- (El Salvador national football team) Joshua Pérez
- (El Salvador national football team) Juan Carlos Portillo
- (El Salvador national football team) Eriq Zavaleta
- (Guatemala national football team) Rudy Barrientos
- (Guatemala national football team) Marvin Ceballos
- (Guatemala national football team) Gerardo Gordillo
- (Guatemala national football team) John Méndez
- (Guatemala national football team) Oscar Santis
- (Guatemala national football team) Jorge Vargas
- (Guyana national football team) Kadell Daniel
- (Guyana national football team) Omari Glasgow
- (Guyana national football team) Terence Vancooten
- (Guyana national football team) Emery Welshman
- (Haiti national football team) Ricardo Adé
- (Haiti national football team) Derrick Etienne Jr.
- (Haiti national football team) Steven Séance
- (Montserrat national football team) Rohan Ince
- (Montserrat national football team) Nathan Pond
- (Nicaragua national football team) Byron Bonilla
- (Nicaragua national football team) Marvin Fletes
- (Nicaragua national football team) Dshon Forbes
- (Nicaragua national football team) Matias Moldskred
- (Nicaragua national football team) Richard Rodríguez
- (Panama national football team) Jorman Aguilar
- (Panama national football team) Yoel Bárcenas
- (Panama national football team) Miguel Camargo
- (Panama national football team) Armando Cooper
- (Panama national football team) José Fajardo
- (Panama national football team) Aníbal Godoy
- (Panama national football team) Francisco Palacios
- (Panama national football team) Alberto Quintero
- (Puerto Rico national football team) Gerald Díaz
- (Puerto Rico national football team) Lester Hayes
- (Puerto Rico national football team) Jaden Servania
- (Puerto Rico national football team) Devin Vega
- (Saint Kitts and Nevis national football team) Rowan Liburd
- (Saint Kitts and Nevis national football team) Vinceroy Nelson
- (Saint Kitts and Nevis national football team) Romaine Sawyers
- (Saint Kitts and Nevis national football team) Omari Sterling-James
- (Saint Vincent and the Grenadines national football team) Oalex Anderson
- (Saint Vincent and the Grenadines national football team) Zidane Sam
- (Saint Vincent and the Grenadines national football team) Azinho Solomon
- (Suriname national football team) Roland Alberg
- (Suriname national football team) Ryan Donk
- (Suriname national football team) Florian Jozefzoon
- (Suriname national football team) Gleofilo Vlijter
- (Trinidad and Tobago national football team) Sheldon Bateau
- (Trinidad and Tobago national football team) Levi García
- (Trinidad and Tobago national football team) Khaleem Hyland
- (Trinidad and Tobago national football team) Joevin Jones
- (Trinidad and Tobago national football team) Duane Muckette
- (Trinidad and Tobago national football team) Ryan Telfer

1 own goal

- (Anguilla national football team) Tafari Smith (against Panama)
- (Aruba national football team) Francois Croes (against Suriname)
- (Dominica national football team) Briel Thomas (against Panama)
