= 2023–24 FC Nordsjælland season =

FC Nordsjælland
2023–24 season
- Chairman: Tom Vernon
- Head coach: Johannes Hoff Thorup
- Stadium: Right to Dream Park
- Superliga: 4th
- Danish Cup: Semi-finals
- UEFA Europa Conference League: Group stage
- Top goalscorer: League: Marcus Ingvartsen; Andreas Schjelderup (9 each); All: Marcus Ingvartsen (15 goals)
Home colours	Away colours
- All statistics correct as of 21 May 2024.

The 2023–24 FC Nordsjælland season was Nordsjælland's twenty-second consecutive season in top division of the Danish football league, the Danish Superliga. In addition to the Superliga, the club also competed in the Danish Cup and the UEFA Europa Conference League. It was the first full season under manager Johannes Hoff Thorup, who joined the club in January 2023 succeeding Flemming Pedersen.

== Transfers ==
=== In ===
No.	Pos	Player	Transferred from	Fee	Date	Source
25	GK	(Finland) Carljohan Eriksson	(Scotland) Dundee United	Undisclosed	9 June 2023	
6	DF	(Denmark) Jeppe Tverskov	(Denmark) Odense BK	Undisclosed	21 June 2023	
7	FW	(Denmark) Marcus Ingvartsen	(Germany) Mainz 05	Undisclosed	7 July 2023	
12	MF	(France) Rocco Ascone	(France) Lille	Undisclosed	19 July 2023	
17	FW	(Norway) Christian Rasmussen	(Netherlands) Ajax	Loan	1 September 2023	
8	FW	(Norway) Andreas Schjelderup	(Portugal) Benfica	Loan (€2.5 million)	2 September 2023	
32	FW	(United States) Milan Iloski	(United States) Orange County	Undisclosed	1 January 2024	
87	GK	(Netherlands) Robbin Ruiter	Unattached	Free	1 January 2024	

=== Out ===
Pos	Player	Transferred to	Fee	Date	Source
MF	(Finland) Leo Walta	(Sweden) Mjällby	Loan	1 August 2023	
DF	(Sweden) Ben Engdahl	(Sweden) Jönköpings Södra	Loan	4 August 2023	
FW	(Ghana) Ernest Nuamah	(Belgium) RWD Molenbeek	€25 million	30 August 2023	
MF	(Ivory Coast) Lasso Coulibaly	(Denmark) Randers	Loan	1 September 2023	
FW	(Finland) Maksim Stjopin	(Finland) Ilves	Undisclosed	1 January 2024	
GK	(Ghana) Emmanuel Ogura	(Denmark) Randers	Loan	18 January 2024	
FW	(Ivory Coast) Mohamed Diomande	(Scotland) Rangers	Loan with obligation to buy	26 January 2024	
DF	(Denmark) Jonas Jensen-Abbew	(Denmark) AGF	Undisclosed	1 February 2024	
DF	(Sweden) Ben Engdahl	(Denmark) FC Helsingør	Loan	1 February 2024	
FW	(Ivory Coast) Yannick Agnero	(Denmark) FC Helsingør	Loan	1 February 2024	
FW	(Ghana) Ibrahim Osman	(England) Brighton & Hove Albion	£16 million	10 February 2024 (Note: Transfer will take effect on 1 July 2024)	

== Competitions ==
=== Danish Superliga ===
==== Regular season ====
Pos	Team	Pld	W	D	L	GF	GA	GD	Pts	Qualification
2	Brøndby	22	14	5	3	44	20	+24	47	Qualification for the Championship round
3	Copenhagen	22	14	3	5	45	23	+22	45	Qualification for the Championship round
4	Nordsjælland	22	10	7	5	35	21	+14	37	Qualification for the Championship round
5	AGF	22	9	9	4	26	21	+5	36	Qualification for the Championship round
6	Silkeborg	22	8	3	11	28	32	−4	27	Qualification for the Championship round

Source: Danish Football Association (in Danish), Soccerway
Rules for classification: 1) Points; 2) Goal difference; 3) Goals scored; 4) Away goals scored; 5) Play-off (played on neutral ground if determining teams for different rounds); 6) Draw.

==== Superliga results summary ====
Overall								Home						Away					
Pld	W	D	L	GF	GA	GD	Pts	W	D	L	GF	GA	GD	W	D	L	GF	GA	GD
17	7	6	4	26	14	+12	27	4	3	1	13	5	+8	3	3	3	13	9	+4

Last updated: 3 December 2023.
Source: Superstats

==== Results by round – Regular season ====
Matchday	1	2	3	4	5	6	7	8	9	10	11	12	13	14	15	16	17	18	19	20	21	22
Ground	H	A	H	A	A	H	A	H	H	A	H	A	A	H	A	H	A	H	A	H	A	H
Result	W	W	W	W	L	W	D	D	D	D	L	W	L	W	L	D	D					
Position	1	1	1	1	2	1	2	3	3	3	4	4	5	5	5	5	5					

Updated to match(es) played on 4 December 2023. Source: FBREF
A = Away; H = Home; W = Win; D = Draw; L = Loss

==== Matches ====
19 July 2023 1	Nordsjælland	4–1	Viborg	Farum
19:00 CEST	Nuamah 29', 45+4', 59'; Nygren 89'	Report	Søndergaard 10'	Stadium: Right to Dream Park; Attendance: 4,143; Referee: Jens Maae

31 July 2023 2	AGF	1–3	Nordsjælland	Aarhus
19:00 CEST	Poulsen 41'	Report	Nygren 35'; Osman 51'; Ingvartsen 86'	Stadium: Aarhus Stadium; Attendance: 9,774; Referee: Peter Kjærsgaard-Andersen

6 August 2023 3	Nordsjælland	3–1	Brøndby	Farum
18:00 CEST	Diomande (yellow card) 47'; Ingvartsen 52' (Osman); Nuamah 74'; Frese 80' (Nuamah)	Summary	Vallys 37' (Omoijuanfo); Radošević (yellow card) 54'; Heggheim (yellow card) 56'	Stadium: Right to Dream Park; Attendance: 6,564; Referee: Morten Krogh

13 August 2023 4	Randers	0–5	Nordsjælland	Randers
14:00 CEST		Report	Björkengren 13' (o.g.); Antman 65'; Tverskov 72'; Harder 81'; Nagalo 89'	Stadium: Randers Stadium; Attendance: 4,935; Referee: Jakob Sundberg

20 August 2023 5	Silkeborg	2–0	Nordsjælland	Silkeborg
14:00 CEST	Tengstedt 58' (pen.); Lind 67'	Report		Stadium: Silkeborg Stadium; Attendance: 4,446; Referee: Jonas Hansen

27 August 2023 6	Nordsjælland	3–0	Midtjylland	Herning
18:00 CEST	Ingvartsen 7' (Svensson) 53' (Osman); Dorgeles 90' (Ingvartsen)	FCM Summary	Brumado (yellow card) 12'; Gabriel (yellow card) 31'; Charles (yellow card) 86'	Stadium: Right to Dream Stadium; Attendance: 4,905; Referee: Sandi Putros

3 September 2023 7	Lyngby	1–1	Nordsjælland	Lyngby
14:00 CEST	Guðjohnsen 31'	Report	Hansen 90+7'	Stadium: Lygnby Stadium; Attendance: 7,136; Referee: Jørgen Burchardt

17 September 2023 8	Nordsjælland	2–2	Copenhagen	Farum
16:00 CEST	Tverskov 27' (Svensson); Frese 62' (Diomande); Rasmussen (yellow card) 90+2'	Report	Óskarsson 16' (Achouri); Jelert (yellow card) 38'; Gonçalves (yellow card) 45'; Elyounoussi 54' (Achouri); Vavro (yellow card) 83'	Stadium: Right to Dream Park; Attendance: 8,836; Referee: Jakob Kehlet

25 September 2023 9	Nordsjælland	0–0	Hvidovre IF	Farum
19:00 CEST		Report		Stadium: Right to Dream Park; Attendance: 4,145; Referee: Sandi Putros

1 October 2023 10	Vejle	0–0	Nordsjælland	Vejle
14:00 CEST		Report		Stadium: Vejle Stadium; Attendance: 7,121; Referee: Simon Rasmussen

8 October 2023 11	Nordsjælland	0–1	Odense	Farum
14:00 CEST		Report	Don Deedson 24'	Stadium: Right to Dream Park; Attendance: 4,106; Referee: Lasse Graagaard

22 October 2023 12	Viborg	0–2	Nordsjælland	Viborg
16:00 CEST		Report	Mbom 83' (o.g.); Ingvartsen 83'	Stadium: Viborg Stadium; Attendance: 5,354; Referee: Simon Rasmussen

29 October 2023 13	Brøndby	2–1	Nordsjælland	Brøndbyvester
18:00 CEST	Kvistgaarden 16' (Vallys); Radošević (yellow card) 45'; Vallys 64' (Rasmussen); Lauritsen (yellow card) 85'; Rasmussen (yellow card) 88'	Summary	Ingvartsen 35' (pen.)	Stadium: Brøndby Stadium; Attendance: 20,011; Referee: Sandi Putros

5 November 2023 14	Nordsjælland	1–0	Vejle	Farum
14:00 CET	Schjelderup 62'	Report		Stadium: Right to Dream Park; Attendance: 3,984; Referee: Menelaos Antoniou

12 November 2023 15	Midtjylland	2–0	Nordsjælland	Herning
15:00 CET	Sørensen (yellow card) 34' (goal) 55' (Paulinho); Dalsgaard (yellow card) 56'; Osorio 90+4' (Djú)	FCM Summary	Frese (yellow card) 37'; Ascone (yellow card) 90+1'	Stadium: MCH Arena; Attendance: 9,320; Referee: Jens Maae

26 November 2023 16	Nordsjælland	0–0	AGF	Farum
14:00 CET		Report		Stadium: 4,043; Attendance: Right to Dream Park; Referee: Aydin Uslu

3 December 2023 17	Odense	1–1	Nordsjælland	Odense
14:00 CET		Report		Stadium: Odense Stadium

26 February 2024 19	Copenhagen	v	Nordsjælland	Copenhagen
19:00 CET		Report		Stadium: Parken

=== Danish Cup ===
28 September 2023 Third round	Kolding IF	2–2 (a.e.t.) (2–3 p)	Nordsjælland	Kolding Stadium
18:00	Beck 46'; Tånnander (yellow card) 50' (goal) 54' (Trier); Vetter (yellow card) 58'; Shushman (yellow card) 67'; Vestergaard (yellow card) 83'; Tjørnelund (yellow card) 90+5'		Svensson (yellow card) 21'; Nygren 48' (Hansen) (yellow card) 81'; Frese 71' (Hansen) (yellow card) 90+4'	Referee: Mikkel Redder
	Penalties
	Kudsk (penalty scored); Denius (penalty missed); Mikkselsen (penalty scored); Nørager (penalty missed); Ngongo (penalty missed)		(penalty missed) Ingvartsen; (penalty scored) Nagalo; (penalty scored) Nygren; (penalty scored) Schjelderup

1 November 2023 Round of 16	Viborg	2–3	Nordsjælland	Viborg Stadium
18:00	Grønning 31'; Søndergaard 64'		Rasmussen 45+1' (Schjelderup) 54' (Schjelderup) 57' (Schjelderup); Svensson (yellow card) 65'; Frese (yellow card) 76'; Hansen (yellow card) 90+3'	Referee: Mads-Kristoffer Kristoffersen

6 December 2023 Quarter-finals first leg	Nordsjælland	3–0	AB Gladsaxe	Farum
	Harder 48' 86' (Ascone); Osman 70' (Rasmussen)			Stadium: Right to Dream Park; Attendance: 1,900; Referee: Jonas Hansen

9 December 2023 Quarter-finals second leg	AB Gladsaxe	1–2 (5–1 agg.)	Nordsjælland	Gladsaxe
	Gaub-Jakobsen (yellow card) 34'; Doumbia (yellow card) 72'; Freriks 88' (Pedersen)		Barslund 24' (Svensson); Svensson 34' (pen)	Stadium: Gladsaxe Stadium; Referee: Aydin Uslu

29 March 2024 Semi-finals first leg	Nordsjælland	v	AGF	Farum
				Stadium: Right to Dream Park

10 April 2024 Semi-finals second leg	AGF	v	Nordsjælland	Aarhus
				Stadium: Aarhus Stadium

=== UEFA Europa Conference League ===
==== Third qualifying round ====
10 August 2023 Second leg	FCSB (Romania)	0–0	(Denmark) Nordsjælland	Stadionul Steaua, Bucharest
20:30 (21:30 EEST)		Report		Attendance: 27,135; Referee: Miloš Bošković (Montenegro)

17 August 2023 Second leg	Nordsjælland (Denmark)	2–0 (2–0 agg.)	(Romania) FCSB	Right to Dream Park, Farum
18:30	Ingvartsen 43' (pen.), 85'	Report		Attendance: 5,704; Referee: Genc Nuza (Kosovo)

==== Play-off round ====
24 August 2023 First leg	Nordsjælland (Denmark)	5–0	(Serbia) Partizan	Right to Dream Park, Farum
18:30	Frese 11'; Ingvartsen 43' (pen.), 68' (pen.); Villadsen 73'; Ilić 88' (o.g.)	Report		Attendance: 4,120; Referee: Yigal Frid (Israel)

31 August 2023 Second leg	Partizan (Serbia)	0–1 (0–6 agg.)	(Denmark) Nordsjælland	Partizan Stadium, Belgrade
21:00		Report	Osman 30'	Attendance: 2,916; Referee: Kevin Clancy (Scotland)

==== Group stage ====
Pos	Team	Pld	W	D	L	GF	GA	GD	Pts	Qualification	FEN	LUD	NOR	TRN
1	(Turkey) Fenerbahçe	6	4	0	2	13	11	+2	12 (Note: Tied on head-to-head results. Overall goal difference used as a tiebreaker.)	Advance to round of 16	—	3–1	3–1	4–0
2	(Bulgaria) Ludogorets Razgrad	6	4	0	2	11	11	0	12	Advance to knockout round play-offs	2–0	—	1–0	4–0
3	(Denmark) Nordsjælland	6	3	1	2	17	7	+10	10		6–1	7–1	—	1–1
4	(Slovakia) Spartak Trnava	6	0	1	5	3	15	−12	1		1–2	1–2	0–2	—

Source: UEFA
Rules for classification: Group stage tiebreakers
Notes:

21 September 2023 1	Fenerbahçe (Turkey)	3–1	(Denmark) Nordsjælland	Şükrü Saracoğlu Stadium, Istanbul
18:45 (19:45 TRT)	Crespo 24'; Batshuayi 30'; Aziz 47'	Report	Villadsen 55'	Attendance: 36,130; Referee: Gergő Bogár (Hungary)

5 October 2023 2	Nordsjælland (Denmark)	7–1	(Bulgaria) Ludogorets Razgrad	Right to Dream Park, Farum
21:00	Ingvartsen 2' (pen.); Osman 11'; Tverskov 31'; Nygren 32', 74'; Son 68' (o.g.); Rasmussen 86'	Report	Verdon 9' (pen.)	Attendance: 4,069; Referee: Juxhin Xhaja (Albania)

26 October 2023 3	Spartak Trnava (Slovakia)	0–2	(Denmark) Nordsjælland	Anton Malatinský Stadium, Trnava
21:00		Report	Jensen-Abbew 36'; Rasmussen 48'	Attendance: 12,539; Referee: Allard Lindhout (Netherlands)

9 November 2023 4	Nordsjælland (Denmark)	1–1	(Slovakia) Spartak Trnava	Right to Dream Park, Farum
18:45	Ingvartsen 32' (pen.)	Report	Ďuriš 61'	Attendance: 5,262; Referee: Mohammed Al-Emara (Finland)

30 November 2023 5	Nordsjælland (Denmark)	6–1	(Turkey) Fenerbahçe	Right to Dream Park, Farum
21:00	Hey 21'; Svensson 25'; Nygren 55', 75', 84'; Rasmussen 66'	Report	Batshuayi 43'	Attendance: 7,323; Referee: Jérémie Pignard (France)

14 December 2023 6	Ludogorets Razgrad (Bulgaria)	1–0	(Denmark) Nordsjælland	Huvepharma Arena, Razgrad
18:45 (19:45 EET)	Piotrowski 79'	Report		Attendance: 6,464; Referee: Ovidiu Hațegan (Romania)

== Statistics ==
=== Goals ===
As of 6 December 2023

Rank	No.	Nat.	Pos.	Player	Superliga	Danish Cup	Conference League	Total
1	7	(Denmark)	FW	Marcus Ingvartsen	6	0	6	12
2	9	(Sweden)	FW	Benjamin Nygren	3	1	5	9
3	17	(Denmark)	FW	Christian Rasmussen	0	3	3	6
4	5	(Denmark)	MF	Martin Frese	2	1	1	4
4	14	(Ghana)	FW	Ibrahim Osman	1	1	2	4
4		(Ghana)	FW	Ernest Nuamah (Note: No longer with the club)	4	0	0	4
7	6	(Denmark)	DF	Jeppe Tverskov	2	0	1	3
7	40	(Denmark)	FW	Conrad Harder	1	2	0	3
9	23	(Denmark)	DF	Oliver Villadsen	0	0	2	2
9	27	(Sweden)	DF	Daniel Svensson	0	1	1	2
11	4	(Denmark)	MF	Kian Hansen	1	0	0	1
11	8	(Norway)	FW	Andreas Schjelderup	1	0	0	1
11	19	(Denmark)	DF	Lucas Hey	0	0	1	1
11	22	(Finland)	MF	Oliver Antman	1	0	0	1
11	29	(Ivory Coast)	MF	Mario Dorgeles	1	0	0	1
11	39	(Burkina Faso)	DF	Adamo Nagalo	1	0	0	1
11	42	(Denmark)	DF	Kaare Barslund	0	1	0	1
11		(Denmark)	DF	Jonas Jensen-Abbew	0	0	1	1
Own goals					2	0	2	4
Totals					26	10	25	61
