= Kenan Hajdarević =

Kenan Hajdarević may refer to the following people:

- Kenan Hajdarević (footballer)
- Kenan Hajdarević (politician)
