= Sanel =

Sanel is a given name for males and may refer to:

- Sanel Borić (born 1987), American football (soccer) player
- Sanel Jahić (born 1981), Bosnian football player
- Sanel Kapidžić (born 1990), Bosnian football player
- Sanel Kuljic (born 1977), Austrian football player

== See also ==
- Hopland, California - formerly Sanel, California
