= Abdoul Yoda =

Abdoul Yoda may refer to:

- Karim Yoda (Abdoul Karim Yoda, born 1988), French footballer
- Abdoul Yoda (footballer, born 2000), Burkinabé footballer
