= Ibrahim Osman (footballer, born 2004) =

Ghanaian footballer (born 2004)

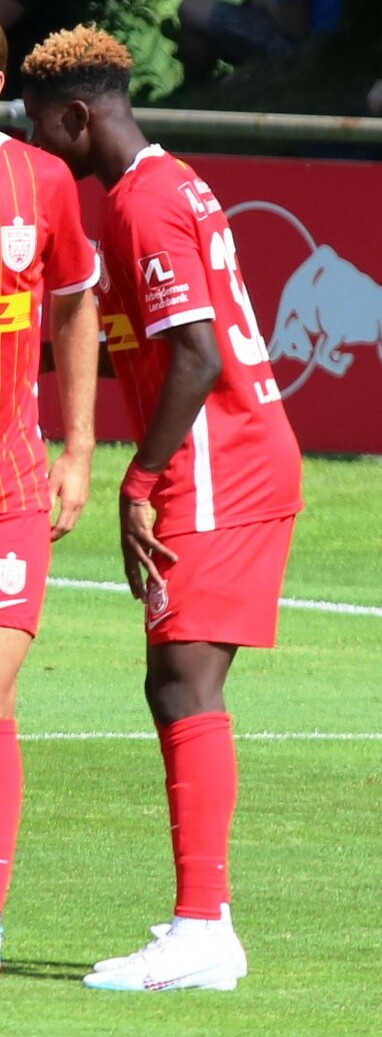
- Osman in 2023

Personal information
- Date of birth: 29 November 2004 (age 21)
- Place of birth: Accra, Ghana
- Height: 1.78 m (5 ft 10 in)
- Position: Winger

Team information
- Current team: Brighton & Hove Albion
- Number: 15

Youth career
- Right to Dream Academy
- 2023: Nordsjælland

Senior career*
Years	Team	Apps	(Gls)
2023–2024	Nordsjælland	35	(6)
2024–	Brighton & Hove Albion	3	(0)
2024–2025	→ Feyenoord (loan)	22	(3)
2025–2026	→ Auxerre (loan)	14	(0)
2026	→ Birmingham City (loan)	17	(2)

International career^{‡}
2024–	Ghana	3	(0)
- * Club domestic league appearances and goals as of 13 September 2026 ‡ National team caps and goals as of 12:11, 19 January 2026 (UTC)

Ibrahim Osman (born 29 November 2004) is a Ghanaian professional footballer who plays as a winger for Premier League club Brighton & Hove Albion, and the Ghana national team.

== Club career ==
=== FC Nordsjælland ===
Osman joined Danish side Nordsjælland in early 2023 from the Right to Dream Academy in Ghana. He made his debut in February 2023, coming on as a substitute for compatriot Ernest Nuamah in a 4–2 win over OB.

=== Brighton & Hove Albion ===
On 10 February 2024, it was announced that Osman would sign a five-year contract with Premier League club Brighton & Hove Albion. The Seagulls paid a reported £16 million transfer fee.

==== Feyenoord (loan) ====
On 15 August 2024, Osman joined Eredivisie club Feyenoord on a season-long loan.

==== Auxerre (loan) ====
Osman joined Ligue 1 club Auxerre on 8 July 2025 on a one-year loan deal.

==== Birmingham City (loan) ====
On 19 January 2026, Osman was recalled from his loan at Auxerre and signed on loan for the remainder of the season at EFL Championship club Birmingham City.

== Career statistics ==
=== Club ===
As of match played 5 November 2026

Appearances and goals by club, season and competition
Club	Season	League			National cup (Note: Includes Danish Cup, KNVB Cup, Coupe de France, FA Cup)		League cup (Note: Includes EFL Cup)		Europe		Total	
Club	Season	Division	Apps	Goals	Apps	Goals	Apps	Goals	Apps	Goals	Apps	Goals
Nordsjælland	2022–23	Danish Superliga	6	0	4	0	—		0	0	10	0
Nordsjælland	2023–24	Danish Superliga	29	6	5	2	—		10 (Note: Appearances in UEFA (Europa) Conference League)	2	44	10
Nordsjælland	Total		35	6	9	2	—		10	2	54	10
Feyenoord (loan)	2024–25	Eredivisie	22	3	3	1	—		7 (Note: Appearances in UEFA Champions League)	0	32	4
Auxerre (loan)	2025–26	Ligue 1	14	0	1	0	—		—		15	0
Birmingham City (loan)	2025–26	EFL Championship	17	2	1	0	—		—		18	2
Brighton & Hove Albion	2026–27	Premier League	3	0	0	0	0	0	5	0	8	0
Career total			91	11	14	3	0	0	22	2	127	16

=== International ===
As of match played 26 March 2024

Appearances and goals by national team and year
National team	Year	Apps	Goals
Ghana	2024	2	0
Total		2	0

== Honours ==
Individual

- Superliga Team of the Month: August 2023
