= Jair Catuy =

Panamanian soccer player (born 1992)

Personal information
- Full name: Jair Ibrahim Catuy Arosemena
- Date of birth: 28 January 1992 (age 34)
- Place of birth: Panama City, Panama
- Height: 1.80 m (5 ft 11 in)
- Position: Forward

Team information
- Current team: A.B.B.

Senior career*
| Years | Team | Apps | (Gls) |
| 2012–2013 | Plaza Amador | 20 | (3) |
| 2013–2014 | Atlético Chiriqui | ? | (?) |
| 2014–2015 | Independiente | 4 | (1) |
| 2015–2017 | Santa Gema | 49 | (13) |
| 2017–2018 | Chorrillo | 25 | (1) |
| 2019 | Tauro | 25 | (10) |
| 2020–2022 | CD Universitario | 19 | (14) |
| 2020 | → San Francisco F.C. (loan) | 12 | (3) |
| 2021–2022 | → Always Ready (loan) | 23 | (6) |
| 2022–2023 | Técnico Universitario | 3 | (0) |
| 2023–2024 | CD Universitario | 26 | (5) |
| 2024 | Platense | 16 | (4) |
| 2024–2025 | Veraguas United | 17 | (3) |
| 2025–2026 | UMECIT | 30 | (4) |
| 2026– | A.B.B. | 0 | (0) |

International career^{‡}
| 2021– | Panama | 6 | (2) |
- * Club domestic league appearances and goals ‡ National team caps and goals as of 17 January 2022

Jair Ibrahim Catuy Arosemena (born 28 January 1992) is a Panamanian professional football player who plays as a center forward for A.B.B. and the Panama national team.

== Club career ==
=== C.D. Plaza Amador ===
Catuy made his debut with the Plaza Amador team in the First Division of Panama.

=== C.A. Independiente ===
Catuy was signed by C.A. Independiente of La Chorrera in December 2013, to play the 2014 Clausura Tournament.

=== Santa Gema F.C. ===
Catuy spend his time with Santa Gema F.C., which was very profitable, as he saw a lot of minutes and scored many goals. He became champion of the 2016–2017 Cup Tournament, and stood out as a promising player of Panamanian soccer.

=== Chorrillo F.C ===
At Chorrillo F.C, Catuy played in the 2017 CONCACAF League.

=== Tauro F.C. ===
Catuy signed for Tauro F.C. in 2019, played a total of 27 games between the league and international tournaments, scoring 10 goals and becoming champion of two tournaments.

=== C.D. Universitario ===
Catuy signed for C.D. Universitario in January 2020, he only played a total of three games before to the tournament being suspended due to the COVID-19 pandemic.

In September 2020, he was loaned for 3 months to San Francisco FC for the Clausura Tournament and the Concacaf League of said semester.

=== San Francisco FC ===
He arrived on loan to San Francisco FC for the 2020 Clausura Tournament, and his arrival to the team was announced on September 28. After the tournament and after being runner-up, he returned to his home team the CD Universitario.

=== Return to C.D. Universitario ===
On January 7, 2021, his return was announced, this time as a franchise player and his return to training with the team.

== International career ==
Catuy made his senior international debut with the Panamanian senior team on 28 January 2021, in the friendly match against the Serbia at the Rommel Fernández Stadium, in a 0–0 draw.

On 25 March 2021, Catuy scored his first goal for Panama in a 1–0 victory over Barbados in a 2022 FIFA World Cup qualifying match.

=== International goals ===
| No. | Date | Venue | Opponent | Score | Result | Competition |
|---|---|---|---|---|---|---|
| 1. | 25 March 2021 | Félix Sánchez Olympic Stadium, Santo Domingo, Dominican Republic | Barbados | 1–0 | 1–0 | 2022 FIFA World Cup qualification |
| 2. | 5 June 2021 | Estadio Nacional Rod Carew, Panama City, Panama | Anguilla | 3–0 | 13–0 | 2022 FIFA World Cup qualification |
