= Adamo Nagalo =

Burkinabé footballer

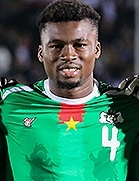
- Nagalo with Burkina Faso in 2024

Personal information
- Date of birth: 22 September 2002 (age 24)
- Place of birth: Adjamé, Ivory Coast
- Height: 1.85 m (6 ft 1 in)
- Position: Centre-back

Team information
- Current team: PSV
- Number: 39

Youth career
- Right to Dream

Senior career*
Years	Team	Apps	(Gls)
2020–2024	Nordsjælland	93	(3)
2024–	PSV	6	(0)
2024–	Jong PSV	3	(0)
2026	→ Konyaspor (loan)	8	(0)

International career^{‡}
2022–	Burkina Faso	27	(1)
- * Club domestic league appearances and goals as of 23:59, 1 June 2026 (UTC) ‡ National team caps and goals as of 23:39, 9 June 2026 (UTC)

Adamo Nagalo (born 22 September 2002) is a professional footballer who plays as a centre-back for Eredivisie club PSV Eindhoven. Born in the Ivory Coast, he represents Burkina Faso at international level.

== Club career ==
=== Nordsjælland ===
Born in Adjamé, Ivory Coast, Nagalo was a part of the Right to Dream Academy in Ghana, before joining FC Nordsjælland in the summer 2020. Nagalo made three appearances for the clubs U-19 team, before he got his professional debut for the club against Lyngby in the Danish Superliga on 12 March 2021, replacing Daniel Svensson with three minutes left. 18-year old Nagalo made a total of six league appearances for Nordsjælland in the 2020–21 season.

Ahead of the 2021–22 season, Nagalo was permanently promoted to the first team squad.

=== PSV Eindhoven ===
On 2 September 2024, Nagalo signed with Dutch club PSV Eindhoven on a five-year deal.

On 30 January 2026, Nagalo was loaned to Konyaspor in Turkey until the end of the 2025–26 season.

== International career ==
Born in the Ivory Coast, Nagalo is of Burkinabé descent. He was called up to the Burkina Faso national team for a set of friendlies in September 2022.

He debuted for the Burkina Faso national team in a 2–1 friendly win against the Ivory Coast on 19 November 2022.

On 20 December 2023, Nagalo was named among the 27 players selected by Hubert Velud to represent Burkina Faso at the 2023 Africa Cup of Nations.

On 8 December 2025, Nagalo was named among the 25 players selected by head coach Brama Traoré to represent Burkina Faso at the 2025 Africa Cup of Nations.

== Career statistics ==
=== Club ===
As of match played 22 May 2026

Appearances and goals by club, season and competition
Club	Season	League			National cup (Note: Includes Danish Cup, KNVB Cup, Turkish Cup)		Europe		Other		Total	
Club	Season	Division	Apps	Goals	Apps	Goals	Apps	Goals	Apps	Goals	Apps	Goals
Nordsjælland	2020–21	Danish Superliga	6	0	0	0	—		—		6	0
Nordsjælland	2021–22	Danish Superliga	27	1	2	0	—		—		29	1
Nordsjælland	2022–23	Danish Superliga	28	1	5	1	—		—		33	2
Nordsjælland	2023–24	Danish Superliga	31	1	5	0	9 (Note: Appearances in UEFA Europa Conference League)	0	—		45	1
Nordsjælland	2024–25	Danish Superliga	1	0	—		—		—		1	1
Nordsjælland	Total		93	3	12	1	9	0	—		114	4
PSV	2024–25	Eredivisie	6	0	1	0	5 (Note: Appearances in UEFA Champions League)	0	—		12	0
PSV	2025–26	Eredivisie	0	0	0	0	0	0	0	0	0	0
PSV	Total		6	0	1	0	5	0	0	0	12	0
Jong PSV	2024–25	Eerste Divisie	3	0	—		—		—		3	0
Konyaspor (loan)	2025–26	Süper Lig	8	0	5	0	—		—		13	0
Career total			110	3	18	1	14	0	0	0	142	4

=== International ===
As of match played 9 June 2026

Appearances and goals by national team and year
National team	Year	Apps	Goals
Burkina Faso	2022	1	0
Burkina Faso	2023	7	0
Burkina Faso	2024	7	0
Burkina Faso	2025	7	0
Burkina Faso	2026	5	1
Total		27	1

Scores and results list Burkina Faso's goal tally first.

List of international goals scored by Adamo Nagalo
No.	Date	Venue	Opponent	Score	Result	Competition
1	31 March 2026	Stade du 4 Août, Ouagadougou, Burkina Faso	Guinea-Bissau	1–0	1–1	Friendly

== Honours ==
PSV

- Eredivisie: 2024–25
- Johan Cruyff Shield: 2025
