= Kenan Hajdarević (footballer) =

Bosnian-Herzegovinan footballer (born 1990)

Personal information
- Full name: Kenan Hajdarević
- Date of birth: 29 January 1990 (age 36)
- Place of birth: Denmark
- Height: 1.86 m (6 ft 1 in)
- Position: Striker

Team information
- Current team: Vatanspor

Youth career
- AGF

Senior career*
Years	Team	Apps	(Gls)
2008–2010	Fredericia	38	(6)
2010–2012	Horsens	34	(4)
2012–2014	SønderjyskE	11	(2)
2013	→ Jönköpings Södra (loan)	11	(2)
2014–2015	AB	9	(1)
2015–2016	KÍ Klaksvík	21	(6)
2016–2017	Brabrand	42	(22)
2018	Fredericia	11	(1)
2018-2019	Atlético Ibañés	18	(4)
2020	Brabrand		
2021-	Vatanspor		

International career
2007	Bosnia and Herzegovina U17	3	(0)
- * Club domestic league appearances and goals as of 1 October 2018

Kenan Hajdarević (born 29 January 1990) is a Bosnian-Herzegovinian footballer who plays as a striker for Danish lower league side Vatanspor.

== Club career ==
He has played for several Danish league sides, having had two spells with Fredericia.
