= Emile Saimovici =

Barbadian footballer (born 1993)

Personal information
- Date of birth: 10 April 1993 (age 33)
- Place of birth: Singapore
- Height: 5 ft 10 in (1.78 m)
- Position: Midfielder

Team information
- Current team: Burnaby FC

Youth career
- Richmond FC

College career
Years	Team	Apps	(Gls)
2011	Clark Penguins		
2013	Centennial Colts	9	(2)

Senior career*
Years	Team	Apps	(Gls)
2014	Durham United		
2014	Master's FA		
2024–	Burnaby FC	25	(3)

International career^{‡}
2021–	Barbados	5	(2)
- * Club domestic league appearances and goals as of August 8, 2025 ‡ National team caps and goals as of 31 December 2021

Emile Saimovici (born 10 April 1993) is a footballer who plays for Burnaby FC in League1 British Columbia. Born in Singapore, he plays for the Barbados national team. Besides Barbados, he has played in Canada and the United States.

== Early life ==
A native of Vancouver, Canada, Saimovici is the son of a Romanian-Canadian father and a Barbadian mother. He earned a scholarship to play for the Oregon State University Beavers, but due to some logistical issues, he instead went to their feeder school Clark College. He later attended Centennial College in Toronto, where he was named an OCAA league all-star in 2013–14.

== Club career ==
In 2014, he played with Durham United FC in League1 Ontario.

He later played at the amateur level with Vancouver Metro Soccer League club Vancouver Croatia SC, where he captained them to their first VMSL title in 30 years.

== International career ==
In March 2021, he was named to the Barbados national team for the first time for 2022 FIFA World Cup qualifying matches. He debuted internationally on 25 March 2021, in a match against Panama in a 1–0 loss. On 30 March 2021, Saimovici scored his first goal for Barbados against Anguilla in a 1–0 victory in his second international game.

== International goals ==
Scores and results list Barbados's goal tally first.

No.	Date	Venue	Opponent	Score	Result	Competition
1.	30 March 2021	Félix Sánchez Olympic Stadium, Santo Domingo, Dominican Republic	Anguilla	1–0	1–0	2022 FIFA World Cup qualification
2.	8 June 2021	Félix Sánchez Olympic Stadium, Santo Domingo, Dominican Republic	Dominica	1–0	1–1	2022 FIFA World Cup qualification

== Honours ==
=== Club ===
Croatia SC

- Vancouver Metro Soccer League: 2018–19
