= Francisco Palacios (footballer) =

Panamanian footballer (born 1990)

Personal information
- Full name: Francisco Antonio Palacios Alleyne
- Date of birth: 10 December 1990 (age 35)
- Place of birth: Panama
- Height: 1.75 m (5 ft 9 in)
- Position: Defender

Team information
- Current team: San Francisco
- Number: 25

Senior career*
| Years | Team | Apps | (Gls) |
| –2013 | Millenium Universidad | | |
| 2013– | San Francisco | 166 | (4) |

International career^{‡}
| 2018– | Panama | 19 | (1) |
- * Club domestic league appearances and goals as of 4 October May 2018 (UTC) ‡ National team caps and goals as of 4 October May 2018 (UTC)

Francisco Antonio Palacios Alleyne (born 10 December 1990) is a Panamanian footballer who plays as a defender for San Francisco and the Panama national team.

== Club career ==
Palacios moved to San Francisco from Millenium Universidad in 2013. Palacios scored his first goal for the club on 29 April 2017 in a 1–2 home loss against Tauro.

== International career ==
Palacios made his international debut for Panama on 17 April 2018 in a 1–0 friendly away win against Trinidad and Tobago. On 14 May 2018, Palacios was included in Panama's preliminary squad for the 2018 World Cup. However, he did not make the final 23.

== International goals ==
| No. | Date | Venue | Opponent | Score | Result | Competition |
|---|---|---|---|---|---|---|
| 1. | 5 June 2021 | Estadio Nacional Rod Carew, Panama City, Panama | Anguilla | 13–0 | 13–0 | 2022 FIFA World Cup qualification |
