= Kenan Hajdarević (politician) =

Serbian politician (born 1975)

Kenan Hajdarević (Serbian Cyrillic: Кенан Хајдаревић; born 25 September 1975) is a Serbian politician of Bosniak ethnicity. He was a Liberal Democratic Party member of the National Assembly of Serbia from 2008 to 2014 and is a member of the party's presidency. Hajdarević is a vocal opponent of Serbian nationalism.

== Early life and private career ==
Hajdarević was born in Priboj, in what was then the Socialist Republic of Serbia in the Socialist Federal Republic of Yugoslavia. He was raised in the city and later graduated from the University of Montenegro's Faculty of Mechanical Engineering in Podgorica. From 2001 to 2008, he was a market researcher for Fabrika automobila Priboj.

== Political career ==
Hajdarević joined the Civic Alliance of Serbia (Građanski savez Srbije, GSS) in 1995 and took part in the protests that led to the fall of Slobodan Milošević's administration in 2000.

The GSS contested the 2003 Serbian parliamentary election on the electoral list of the Democratic Party (Demokratska stranka, DS), and Hajdarević received the 138th list position (out of 250). The list won thirty-seven mandates, and he did not serve in the parliament that followed. (From 2000 to 2011, parliamentary mandates were awarded to sponsoring parties or coalitions rather than to individual candidates, and it was common practice for the mandates to be distributed out of numerical order. Hajdarević could have received a mandate despite his relatively low position, although in the event he did not.) For the 2007 parliamentary election, the GSS appeared on a coalition list fronted by the LDP. Hajdarević once again appeared on the list but was not awarded a mandate. The GSS merged into the LDP later in the year.

The LDP fielded its own list in the 2008 parliamentary election and won thirteen mandates; on this occasion, Hajdarević was chosen for its assembly delegation. The election results were inconclusive, but a new government was eventually formed by the For a European Serbia alliance (led by the Democratic Party) and the Socialist Party of Serbia. The LDP served in opposition.

In 2009, Hajdarević joined with representatives of two other parties to set up one of Serbia's first constituency offices, in Novi Pazar. He attended the inaugural meeting of Novi Pazar's Bosniak Cultural Community in January 2000 and said that the LDP had hoped to participate in the first direct elections for Serbia's Bosniak National Council later in the year but could not legally do so as it was not a minority party.

In January 2012, Serbian president Boris Tadić attended a ceremony marking the twentieth anniversary of the Republika Srpska and received a medal and ribbon from Republika Srpska president Milorad Dodik. This meeting was very controversial; the Republika Srpska was given legal recognition as part of Bosnia and Herzegovina by the 1995 Dayton Agreement, but it had a prior history as a breakaway Bosnian Serb entity in the 1992–95 Bosnian War, and many of its wartime leaders were later convicted of serious war crimes directed primarily against the Bosniak population. The commemoration of the entity's de facto establishment in January 1992 was widely condemned by Bosniak politicians in Serbia. Hajdarević said that the event was "confirmation that the governing parties, for lack of political ideas and a course for Serbia to move forward, are flirting with nationalism," adding, "the marking of this date is not something that anyone should be proud of, least of all President Tadić."

Serbia's electoral system was reformed in 2011, such that parliamentary mandates were awarded in numerical order to candidates on successful lists. The LDP contested the 2012 parliamentary election as part of the Preokret (U-Turn) coalition; Hajdarević received the sixteenth position on its list and was re-elected when it won nineteen mandates. The Serbian Progressive Party formed a new government with the Socialists and other parties after the election, and the LDP remained in opposition. In March 2013, Hajdarević indicated that the LDP would challenge the constitutionality of the Serbian government's aid to Serb indictees at the International Criminal Tribunal for the former Yugoslavia (ICTY), drawing particular attention to a recent visit by a Serbian official to former paramilitary leader Milan Lukić on the anniversary of the Štrpci massacre.

Later in 2013, Hajdarević supported a strike by Fabrika automobila Priboj workers for jobs, health insurance, overdue wages, and a definitive answer on the factory's future.

The LDP's list fell below the threshold needed to win assembly representation in the 2014 election; all of its candidates, including Hajdarević, were excluded from the parliament that followed. In early 2016, he took part in negotiations with the Democratic Party and the Social Democratic Party (Socijaldemokratska stranka, SDS) for a united list in the 2016 election; these negotiations were unsuccessful. The LDP instead formed a coalition with the SDS and the League of Social Democrats of Vojvodina (LSV), which won thirteen mandates. Hajdarević appeared fourteenth on the list and narrowly missed election.

Hajdarević has recently written a series of guest articles in Danas, criticizing what he describes as the failure of the Serbian government to fully come to terms with crimes committed by Serbs in the 1990s Yugoslav Wars, arguing that any constructive dialogue with the government of Kosovo must include a rejection of the Greater Serbia idea, and advocating that Serbia join both the European Union and the North Atlantic Treaty Organization (NATO). He has also called for a modern civil constitution that would recognize Serbia as a state of all its citizens and not only of the Serb people.
