= Sanel Kapidžić =

Danish footballer (born 1990)

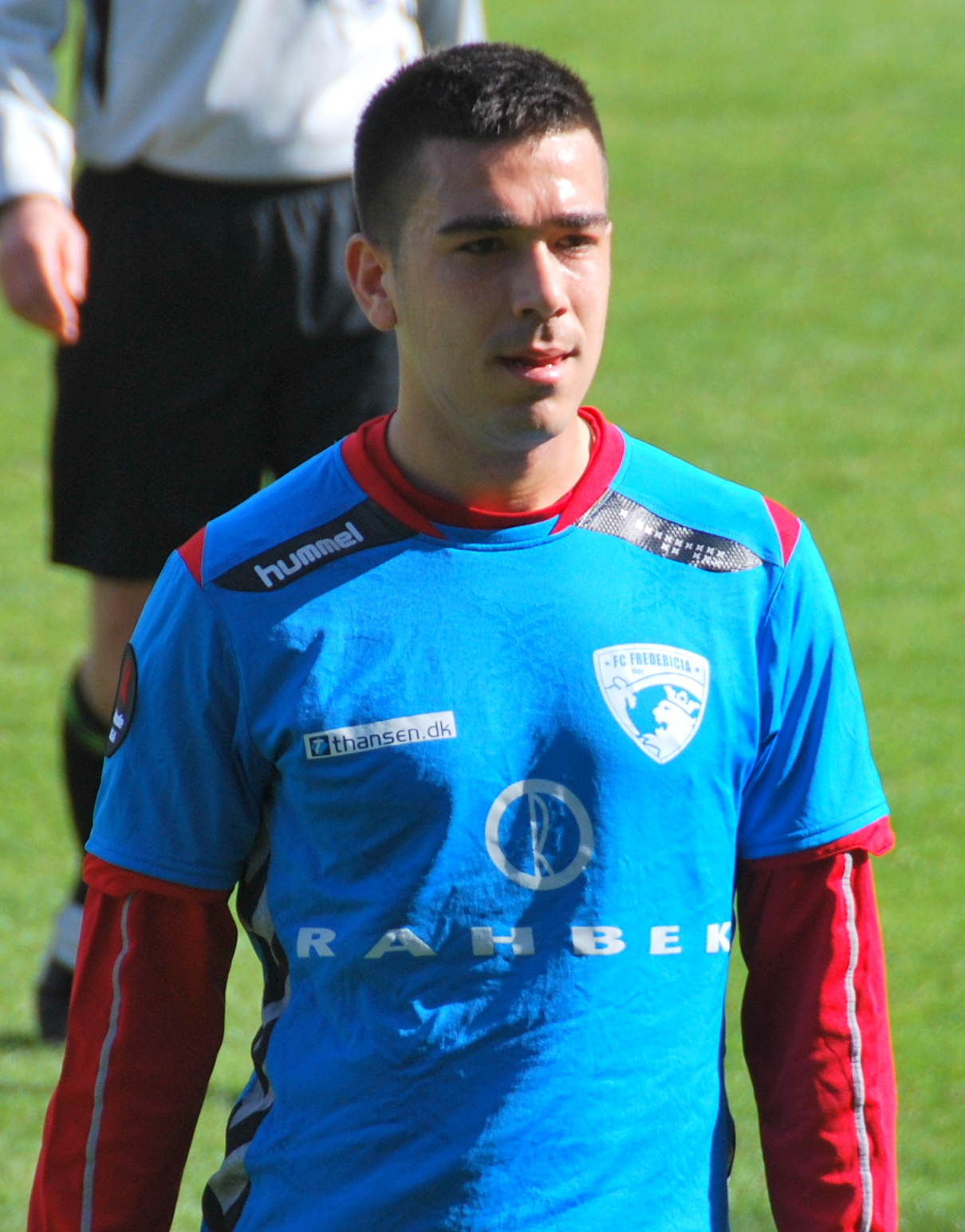
- Kapidžić with FC Fredericia

Personal information
- Date of birth: 14 April 1990 (age 36)
- Place of birth: Sarajevo, SFR Yugoslavia
- Height: 1.83 m (6 ft 0 in)
- Position: Forward

Team information
- Current team: Vatanspor (assistant)

Youth career
- Galten fS
- 2001–2009: AGF

Senior career*
Years	Team	Apps	(Gls)
2009–2012	AGF	35	(7)
2011–2012	→ FC Fredericia (loan)	20	(2)
2012–2013	FC Fyn	10	(1)
2013–2014	Vard Haugesund	27	(13)
2014–2016	Mjøndalen	58	(20)
2016–2017	Fredrikstad	57	(23)
2018	Korona Kielce	4	(2)
2018–2020	Sandnes Ulf	34	(11)
2021–2023	Vatanspor		
- * Club domestic league appearances and goals

Sanel Kapidžić (born 14 April 1990) is a Danish former professional footballer who played as a forward who is currently the assistant coach of Vatanspor.

== Career ==
Born in Bosnia and Herzegovina, Kapidžić has lived in Denmark since 1992. He has always looked up to Zlatan Ibrahimović and hoped he can become like him one day. In an interview to Bosnian media, he said he would prefer to play for the Bosnia national team one day, but playing for the Denmark national team was also a choice.

On 24 August 2012, he moved to FC Fyn.

On 18 July 2018, Kapidžić signed for Sandnes Ulf.

== Career statistics ==
As of 18 September 2019

Appearances and goals by club, season and competition
Club	Season	League			Cup		Other		Total	
Club	Season	Division	Apps	Goals	Apps	Goals	Apps	Goals	Apps	Goals
Vard Haugesund	2013	1. divisjon	27	13	2	1	—		29	14
Mjøndalen	2014	1. divisjon	30	16	4	0	4 (Note: Appearances in promotion play-offs.)	3	38	19
Mjøndalen	2015	Tippeligaen	28	4	4	3	—		32	7
Fredrikstad	2016	1. divisjon	28	12	3	1	—		31	13
Fredrikstad	2017	1. divisjon	29	11	1	0	2 (Note: Appearances in relegation play-offs.)	1	32	12
Korona Kielce	2017–18	Ekstraklasa	4	2	0	0	—		4	2
Sandnes Ulf	2018	OBOS-ligaen	12	6	0	0	0	0	12	6
Sandnes Ulf	2019	OBOS-ligaen	10	3	2	1	0	0	12	4
Career total			168	67	16	6	6	4	190	77
