= Steven Séance =

French-Haitian footballer (born 1992)

Personal information
- Date of birth: 20 February 1992 (age 34)
- Place of birth: Saint-Denis, France
- Height: 1.80 m (5 ft 11 in)
- Position: Defender

Team information
- Current team: Saint-Priest

Youth career
- 2000–2004: Noisy-le-Grand
- 2004–2007: Paris Saint-Germain
- 2007–2012: Torcy

Senior career*
Years	Team	Apps	(Gls)
2012–2015	Meaux		
2015–2018	Noisy-le-Sec	67	(4)
2018–2021	Avranches B	8	(0)
2018–2021	Avranches	64	(6)
2022	Paris 13 Atletico	13	(0)
2022–2023	Sedan	26	(1)
2024	Mâcon	0	(0)
2024–2025	La Roche	24	(1)
2025–	Saint-Priest	17	(0)

International career^{‡}
2021–	Haiti	8	(1)
- * Club domestic league appearances and goals as of 14 February 2026 ‡ National team caps and goals as of 22 March 2024

Steven Séance (born 20 February 1992) is a professional footballer who plays as a defender for Championnat National 1 club Saint-Priest. Born in France, he plays for the Haiti national team.

== Club career ==
On 23 June 2022, Séance signed for Championnat National side Sedan.

== International career ==
On 25 March 2021, Séance made his international debut for Haiti in a 2–0 victory over Belize in 2022 FIFA World Cup qualification. He scored the second goal of the match.

== Honours ==
Paris 13 Atletico

- Championnat National 2: 2021–22
