= Lester Hayes III =

Puerto Rican footballer (born 1993)

Personal information
- Date of birth: September 19, 1993 (age 33)
- Place of birth: Savannah, Georgia, United States
- Height: 1.95 m (6 ft 5 in)
- Position: Forward

Team information
- Current team: Middelfart
- Number: 28

College career
| Years | Team | Apps | (Gls) |
| 2011–2014 | UC Irvine Anteaters | 79 | (12) |

Senior career*
| Years | Team | Apps | (Gls) |
| 2014 | OC Pateadores Blues | 11 | (1) |
| 2014–2016 | PSA Elite | | |
| 2016–2017 | ASC San Diego | | |
| 2017–2018 | Almuñécar City | 10 | (14) |
| 2018 | Cúllar Vega | 8 | (6) |
| 2018–2020 | Alhaurino | 63 | (21) |
| 2020–2021 | El Palo | 21 | (2) |
| 2021 | Dalum | 4 | (2) |
| 2021– | Middelfart | 48 | (8) |

International career^{‡}
| 2021– | Puerto Rico | 3 | (1) |
- * Club domestic league appearances and goals as of July 17, 2023 ‡ National team caps and goals as of June 10, 2022

Lester "Tre" Hayes III (born September 19, 1993) is a footballer who plays as a forward for Danish 2nd Division club Middelfart. Born in the mainland United States, he represents the Puerto Rico national team. Besides the United States, he has played in Spain and Denmark.

== Youth and college career ==
As a youth, Hayes played for MD Nike Rush and DeMatha Catholic High School. From 2011 through 2014 Hayes played college soccer for the UC Irvine Anteaters. Over that time he scored 12 goals in 79 appearances. His 79 appearances for the team is tied for 6th place in that category in program history. On February 4, 2013, he scored for the Anteaters in a 2–0 friendly victory over Real Salt Lake of Major League Soccer.

== Club career ==
Hayes III started his career with OC Pateadores Blues of the Premier Development League. He tallied two assists in the opening match of the 2014 PDL season. That year he made eleven league appearances for the club, scoring one goal. He then moved to American fifth division side PSA Elite in 2014. That year he was part of the squad that advanced to the Third round of the 2014 U.S. Open Cup by defeating LA Galaxy II. After that, he signed for ASC San Diego of the National Premier Soccer League, the country's fourth division, for the 2016 and 2017 seasons.

In 2017, Hayes made the move abroad and signed for a short spell with Spanish club Almuñécar City before moving to Cullar Vega CF, both of the Tercera Andaluza. During his first season in Spain, he scored a total of 20 goals in 18 league matches. His performance lead him to be signed by CD Alhaurino four tiers higher. After again impressing with 21 goals in 63 matches for the club, Hayes signed for El Palo FC for the 2020–21 season.

On July 30, 2021, Hayes joined Danish 3rd Division club Dalum. After scoring twice in five appearances for the club, he left due to "circumstances, they were not at fault for", and instead signed with Danish 2nd Division club Middelfart in September 2021.

== International career ==
Hayes made his senior international debut for Puerto Rico on 2 June 2021, in a 2022 FIFA World Cup qualification match against the Bahamas. After coming on as a 64th-minute substitute, he scored his first international goal for the team, the final tally of an eventual 7–0 victory.

=== International goals ===
Scores and results list Puerto Rico's goal tally first.

| No. | Date | Venue | Opponent | Score | Result | Competition |
|---|---|---|---|---|---|---|
| 1. | 2 June 2021 | Mayagüez Athletics Stadium, Mayagüez, Puerto Rico | Bahamas | 7–0 | 7–0 | 2022 FIFA World Cup |
Last updated 2 June 2021

=== International career statistics ===
As of June 10, 2022

Puerto Rico
| Year | Apps | Goals |
|---|---|---|
| 2021 | 2 | 1 |
| 2022 | 1 | 0 |
| Total | 3 | 1 |
