= Cavafe =

Cuban football player (born 1999)

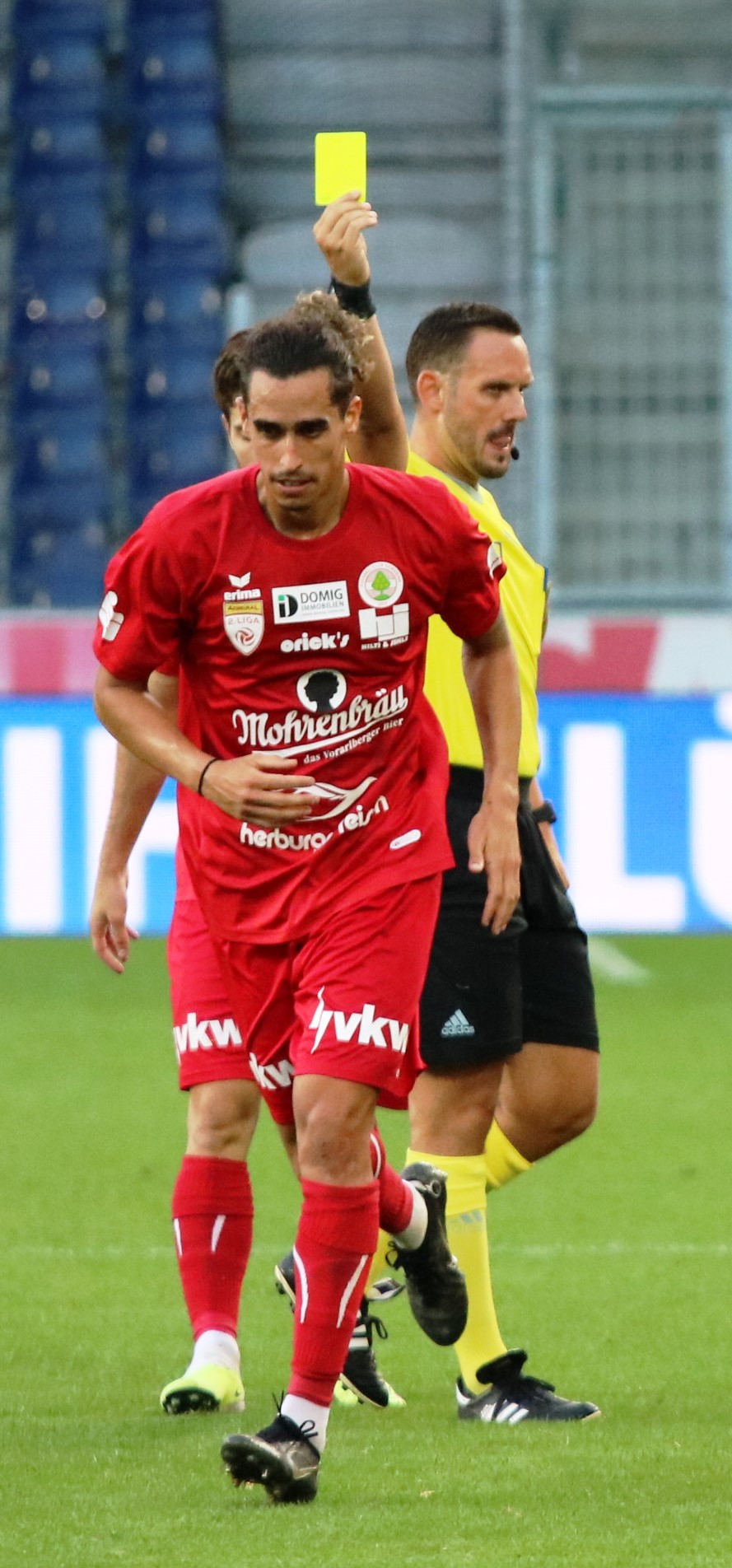

Personal information
- Full name: Carlos Alberto Vázquez Fernández
- Date of birth: 25 April 1999 (age 27)
- Place of birth: Havana, Cuba
- Height: 1.85 m (6 ft 1 in)
- Position: Centre-back

Team information
- Current team: Unión Adarve
- Number: 5

Youth career
- Valdemorillo
- 2010–2013: Canillas
- 2013: San Fernando
- 2013–2018: Atlético Madrid

Senior career*
Years	Team	Apps	(Gls)
2018–2019	San Fernando	16	(0)
2019–2020	Alcorcón B	26	(0)
2020–2021	Alcorcón	0	(0)
2020	→ Unionistas (loan)	5	(1)
2021	→ Navalcarnero (loan)	4	(0)
2021–2022	Bergantiños	11	(0)
2022	Tudelano	17	(0)
2022–2024	FC Dornbirn	54	(2)
2024–	Unión Adarve	19	(0)

International career^{‡}
2021–	Cuba	28	(2)
- * Club domestic league appearances and goals as of 30 March 2025 ‡ National team caps and goals as of 10 June 2025

Carlos Alberto Vázquez Fernández (born 25 April 1999), commonly known as Cavafe, is a Cuban professional footballer who plays as a centre-back for Segunda Federación club Sitra Club and the Cuba national team.

== Club career ==
Born in Havana, Cavafe moved to Madrid in 2003 at the age of three, and represented CD Valdemorillo, CD Canillas, CD San Fernando de Henares and Atlético Madrid as a youth. On 23 August 2018, after finishing his formation, he returned to San Fernando and was assigned to the main squad in Tercera División.

Cavafe made his senior debut on 26 August 2018, starting in a 1–2 away loss against Rayo Vallecano B. The following 1 February, he signed for AD Alcorcón and was initially assigned to the reserves also in the fourth tier.

Cavafe made his first team debut on 17 December 2019, starting and being sent off in a 0–1 away loss against CP Cacereño, for the season's Copa del Rey. The following 14 January, he was loaned to Segunda División B side Unionistas de Salamanca CF until the end of the campaign.

On 20 June 2022, Cavafe signed for Austrian second tier side FC Dornbirn.

== International career ==
In March 2021, Cavafe was named in Cuba senior team's historic squad which included players from foreign clubs for the first time. On 25 March 2021, he made his senior team debut in a 0–1 defeat against Guatemala.

== Career statistics ==
=== International ===
As of match played 10 June 2025

Appearances and goals by national team and year
National team	Year	Apps	Goals
Cuba	2021	4	1
Cuba	2022	8	1
Cuba	2023	10	0
Cuba	2024	4	0
Cuba	2025	2	0
Total		28	2

Scores and results list Cuba's goal tally first, score column indicates score after each Cavafe goal.

List of international goals scored by Cavafe
No.	Date	Venue	Opponent	Score	Result	Competition
1	2 June 2021	Estadio Doroteo Guamuch Flores, Guatemala City, Guatemala	British Virgin Islands	4–0	5–0	2022 FIFA World Cup qualification
2	15 November 2022	Estadio Cibao, Santiago de los Caballeros, Dominican Republic	Dominican Republic	3–2	4–2	Friendly
