= Marius Elvius =

Danish footballer (born 2002)

Personal information
- Full name: Marius Elvius Kolind-Jørgensen
- Date of birth: 1 June 2002 (age 24)
- Place of birth: Tårnby, Denmark
- Height: 1.85 m (6 ft 1 in)
- Position: Right midfielder

Team information
- Current team: Kristiansund

Youth career
- Tårnby FF
- Vanløse
- –2017: Brøndby
- 2017–2020: HB Køge
- 2021: → Hellas Verona (loan)

Senior career*
| Years | Team | Apps | (Gls) |
| 2019–2022 | HB Køge | 48 | (6) |
| 2022–2025 | Vejle | 83 | (3) |
| 2025–2026 | Hvidovre | 26 | (2) |
| 2026– | Kristiansund | 0 | (0) |

International career
| 2019 | Denmark U18 | 5 | (0) |
- * Club domestic league appearances and goals as of 2 June 2026

Marius Elvius Kolind-Jørgensen (born 1 June 2002) is a Danish professional footballer who plays as a right midfielder for Eliteserien club Kristiansund.

== Career ==
=== HB Køge & Hellas Verona ===
Elvius was born in Tårnby and started playing football at Tårnby FF at the age of four. He later moved to Vallensbæk IF, then to Brøndby IF for three years from U11 and U14, before joining HB Køge as an U15 player. Elvius worked his way up through the youth ranks at Køge and on 29 March 2019 the club confirmed, that 16-year old Elvius had signed a deal until June 2022. In the current season, until his new contract, Elvius had scored 23 goals in 16 games for the club's U17 team.

He got his official debut for Køge two days later, 31 March 2019 against Silkeborg IF in the Danish 1st Division. He made a total of three appearances in that season. Later in 2019, Elvius became a permanent part of Køge's first team squad. Elvius began playing more and more.

Elvius began to play more and more, so clubs in Europe also began to take an interest in him. On 21 January 2021 it was confirmed, that 18-year old Elvius had joined Italian club Hellas Verona on loan for the rest of the season, where he was going to play for the clubs U19 team. Elvius played 18 games for Hellas, where he scored five goals and made three assists. At the end of the spell, Elvius was offered a permanent deal by Hellas, but decided to reject the offer and returned to Køge.

=== Vejle ===
On 1 February 2022, newly promoted Danish Superliga club Vejle Boldklub confirmed, that Elvius had joined the club on a deal until June 2025. He got his debut for Vejle on 15 May 2022 against FC Nordsjælland in the Danish Superliga.

After helping securing Vejle promotion to the 2023–24 Danish Superliga, the club confirmed on 20 July 2023, that Elvius had signed a new deal with the club until June 2026.

=== Hvidovre ===
On 21 August 2025, Elvius left Vejle to join Danish 1st Division club Hvidovre IF. The club did not announce the duration of the contract.

== Honours ==
Vejle

- Danish 1st Division: 2022–23
