= Marvin Fletes =

Nicaraguan footballer

Personal information
- Full name: Marvin David Fletes
- Date of birth: 12 November 1997 (age 28)
- Place of birth: Managua, Nicaragua
- Height: 1.78 m (5 ft 10 in)
- Position: Defender

Team information
- Current team: Real Estelí
- Number: 3

Senior career*
Years	Team	Apps	(Gls)
2016–2017	Walter Ferretti	?	(0)
2017–2019	UNAN Managua	?	(2)
2019–2020	Diriangén	?	(2)
2021	Walter Ferretti	21	(2)
2021–	Real Estelí		

International career^{‡}
2019–	Nicaragua	39	(2)
- * Club domestic league appearances and goals ‡ National team caps and goals as of 26 March 2025

Marvin David Fletes (born 12 November 1997) is a Nicaraguan professional footballer who plays as a defender for Liga Primera club Real Estelí and the Nicaragua national team.

== International career ==
Fletes debuted internationally on 5 September 2019 in a CONCACAF Nations League match against St. Vincent and the Grenadines in a 1–1 draw. On 27 March 2021, he scored his first goal for Nicaragua against Turks and Caicos Islands in a 7–0 2022 FIFA World Cup qualifying victory.
