= Søren Andreasen =

Danish footballer (born 1996)

Personal information
- Full name: Søren Skals Andreasen
- Date of birth: 13 March 1996 (age 30)
- Place of birth: Starup, Denmark
- Height: 1.78 m (5 ft 10 in)
- Position: Striker

Team information
- Current team: Aarhus Fremad
- Number: 9

Youth career
- Starup IF
- Esbjerg fB

Senior career*
Years	Team	Apps	(Gls)
2015–2016	Esbjerg fB	1	(0)
2016–2017	ÍBV	8	(0)
2017	Kolding IF	16	(8)
2017–2020	Middelfart G&BK	75	(28)
2020–2023	Aarhus Fremad	77	(51)
2023–2024	Sønderjyske	43	(13)
2024–2026	Hobro	62	(14)
2026–	Aarhus Fremad	0	(0)

International career
2013	Denmark U17	3	(0)
- * Club domestic league appearances and goals as of 3 September 2026

Søren Skals Andreasen (born 13 March 1996) is a Danish footballer who plays as a striker for Danish 1st Division club Aarhus Fremad.

He came through the Esbjerg fB academy and spent time in Iceland and in the Danish 2nd Division before a prolific three years at Aarhus Fremad led to moves to Sønderjyske and Hobro.

== Club career ==
=== Esbjerg fB ===
Andreasen joined Esbjerg fB from Starup IF at the age of 14 and was the leading scorer for both the club's under-17 and under-19 sides. He trained with Tottenham Hotspur in October 2013 but was not offered a contract. In the final match of 2014 he suffered an anterior cruciate ligament injury that kept him out for ten months, but he signed a new one-year contract in February 2015 to take effect from 1 July.

He made his only Superliga appearance on 20 March 2016, coming on for the closing minutes away to Brøndby. Andreasen left the club at the end of the season.

=== ÍBV ===
Andreasen trained with Fredericia after leaving Esbjerg. A month later he signed for Icelandic club ÍBV.

=== Kolding and Middelfart ===
On 1 February 2017, Andreasen signed for amateur club Kolding IF, where he became the leading scorer. Middelfart signed him on 21 June 2017 on a one-year contract, which was extended at the end of that year to run until the end of 2019.

=== Aarhus Fremad ===
Andreasen joined Aarhus Fremad in the winter break of the 2019–20 season on the expiry of his Middelfart contract, having already been living in Aarhus and training with the squad. He was working as a carpenter at the time and continued to do so during his spell at the club.

Over three years at Riisvangen he scored 59 goals in 86 matches. The autumn of 2022 was his most productive period, when he scored 13 goals in 14 2nd Division matches and went into the winter break as the division's leading scorer, adding six assists and goals in three cup ties. One of those came in a 4–0 upset win over Brøndby in October 2022, when he scored shortly before half-time as Aarhus Fremad reached the cup quarter-finals.

=== SønderjyskE ===
In January 2023, Andreasen left for Sønderjyske on his first full-time contract. He made his debut on 19 February 2023 in a 0–0 draw against Næstved in the Danish 1st Division. He scored ten goals in the 2023–24 season as the club won promotion to the Superliga, and played three Superliga matches the following season.

=== Hobro ===
On 1 September 2024, close to the end of the transfer window, Andreasen signed a three-year contract with Hobro IK. Sporting director Lars Justesen said that Andreasen had proved he could score in the divisions and would be expected to take responsibility in an otherwise young squad.

=== Return to Aarhus Fremad ===
Andreasen rejoined Aarhus Fremad from Hobro on 2 September 2026, taking the number 9 shirt.
