= Frederikshavn Stadium =

Stadium in Denmark

Coordinates: 57.4412°N 10.5204°E

Frederikshavn Stadion is a multi-use stadium in Frederikshavn, Denmark. It is used mostly for football matches and is the home stadium of Frederikshavn fI. The stadium holds 15,000 people.
