= Vatanspor =

Danish football club

- Full name: Vatanspor
- Founded: 1989; 37 years ago
- Ground: Sødalskolen, Bøgeskov Idrætsanlæg and Arena Vest Kunstgræsbane; Brabrand and Viby J, Denmark
- Chairman: Haci Kara
- Head coach: Haci Kara; Sanel Kapidžić
- League: Jutland Series (VI)
- Website: https://vatanspor.dk/index.html
Home colours

Vatanspor is an association football club based in Brabrand, Aarhus Denmark, that competes in the Jutland Series, one of the sixth tiers of the Danish football league system.

Founded in 1989, the club is affiliated to DBU Jutland, the regional football association. The team plays its home matches at Arena Vest Kunstgræsbane. The club was founded by Turkish immigrants.

== History ==
Vatanspor was founded by Mustafa Pelit, current chairman of the club, and a group of other young men with a Turkish background on Lottesvej 12, Brabrand in 1989. The intention of forming the club was keeping troubled youths away from the streets and at the same time uniting young people with an immigrant background in one team.

In June 2011, in a Series 1 match against local rivals from Lystrup IF, a supporter from Vatanspor spat the match official in his face after the match, which had seen some questionable refereeing decisions. As a result, the club was suspended by the Danish Football Union (DBU) in both league– and cup matches, a decision which was since overturned after a dialogue between all parties. Vatanspor was, however, required to hire guards on matchdays.

As of 2020, Vatanspor has five teams represented in the regional tiers of DBU Jutland, with its first team competing in the Jutland Series. In 2016, the club reached the Denmark Series, the fourth highest tier in Danish football, for the first time in its history after beating SSV Højfyn in play-offs. Thereby, Vatanspor became the only second immigrant club in Danish football history to reach that level after FK Prespa, a Copenhagen-based club with Macedonian roots achieved this feat in 1999.

Vatanspor has around 100 members and has been represented by people with Danish, Turkish, Iranian, Iraqi, Sudanese, Somali, American, Faroese, Bosnian, Lebanese, Palestinian and Kurdish background.

On 1 September 2022, Vatanspor faced Danish Superliga club AGF in the Danish Cup. The match was the focus of a political debate, as AGF had served kebab on Aarhus Stadium to accommodate the mainly Muslim fans of Vatanspor, a club founded by Turkish immigrants. This meant that right-wing Danish People's Party co-founder Pia Kjærsgaard attended the match.

In the 2026–27 Danish Cup they knocked out former Danish champions AaB in the second round 2–1 in extra time.
