= Daniel Svensson (footballer, born 2002) =

Swedish footballer (born 2002)

- Svensson with Sweden in 2026

Personal information
- Full name: Daniel Jonathan Svensson
- Date of birth: 12 February 2002 (age 24)
- Place of birth: Stockholm, Sweden
- Height: 1.83 m (6 ft 0 in)
- Positions: Wing-back; full-back

Team information
- Current team: Borussia Dortmund
- Number: 24

Youth career
- 2006–2009: Irsta IF
- 2010–2013: Skiljebo SK
- 2014–2019: Brommapojkarna
- 2020: Nordsjælland

Senior career*
Years	Team	Apps	(Gls)
2020	Brommapojkarna	6	(1)
2020–2025	Nordsjælland	127	(5)
2025	→ Borussia Dortmund (loan)	12	(1)
2025–	Borussia Dortmund	41	(3)

International career^{‡}
2018	Sweden U17	3	(0)
2019–2020	Sweden U19	4	(1)
2021–2024	Sweden U21	20	(2)
2024–	Sweden	21	(1)
- * Club domestic league appearances and goals as of 31 October 2026 ‡ National team caps and goals as of 17 November 2026

Daniel Jonathan Svensson (born 12 February 2002) is a Swedish professional footballer who plays as a wing-back or full-back for Bundesliga club Borussia Dortmund and the Sweden national team.

== Club career ==
Svensson was born in Stockholm and started playing football at age four at the local club Irsta IF before he moved to other Swedish clubs, namely Siljebo and Brommapojkarna.

Svensson began his senior career with IF Brommapojkarna in 2020 before joining Danish Superliga club FC Nordsjælland later that year. He established himself in Nordsjælland´s first team, making more than 120 league appearances for the club before joining Dortmund on a loan.

On 3 February 2025, Svensson joined Borussia Dortmund in Germany on loan from Nordsjælland with an option to buy. On 20 April, he scored his first goal for Dortmund in a 3–2 victory over Borussia Mönchengladbach.

After a successful loan spell, he joined on a permanent contract on 14 May 2025. Later that year, on 1 October, he netted his first UEFA Champions League goal in a 4–1 win over Athletic Bilbao.

== International career ==
Svensson made his full international debut for the Sweden national team on 14 October 2024, replacing Yasin Ayari in the 89th minute of a UEFA Nations League game against Estonia which Sweden won 3–0.

On 12 May 2026, Svensson was called up for the Swedish squad for the 2026 FIFA World Cup.

== Career statistics ==
=== Club ===
As of match played 31 October 2026

Appearances and goals by club, season and competition
Club	Season	League			National cup (Note: Includes Swedish Cup, Danish Cup, DFB-Pokal)		Europe		Other		Total	
Club	Season	Division	Apps	Goals	Apps	Goals	Apps	Goals	Apps	Goals	Apps	Goals
IF Brommapojkarna	2020	Ettan	6	1	3	0	—		—		9	1
Nordsjælland	2020–21	Danish Superliga	22	0	0	0	—		—		22	0
Nordsjælland	2021–22	Danish Superliga	27	1	2	0	—		—		29	1
Nordsjælland	2022–23	Danish Superliga	29	2	6	1	—		—		35	3
Nordsjælland	2023–24	Danish Superliga	31	2	5	1	10 (Note: Appearances in UEFA Europa Conference League)	1	—		46	4
Nordsjælland	2024–25	Danish Superliga	17	2	2	0	—		—		19	2
Nordsjælland	Total		126	7	15	2	10	1	0	0	151	10
Borussia Dortmund (loan)	2024–25	Bundesliga	12	1	—		4 (Note: Appearances in UEFA Champions League)	0	5 (Note: Appearances in FIFA Club World Cup)	1	21	2
Borussia Dortmund	2025–26	Bundesliga	33	2	3	0	9	2	—		45	4
Borussia Dortmund	2026–27	Bundesliga	8	1	2	1	3	0	1 (Note: Appearance in Franz Beckenbauer Supercup)	0	14	2
Borussia Dortmund	Dortmund total		53	4	5	1	16	2	6	1	80	8
Career total			184	12	23	3	26	3	6	1	299	19

=== International ===
As of match played 17 November 2026

Appearances and goals by national team and year
National team	Year	Apps	Goals
Sweden	2024	1	0
Sweden	2025	8	0
Sweden	2026	12	1
Total		21	1

Scores and results list Sweden's goal tally first, score column indicates score after each Svensson goal.

List of international goals scored by Daniel Svensson
No.	Date	Venue	Cap	Opponent	Score	Result	Competition
1	14 November 2026	Nationalarenan, Solna, Sweden	20	Bosnia and Herzegovina	1–0	3–2	2026–27 UEFA Nations League B

== Honours ==
Individual

- Bundesliga Rookie of the Month: April 2025
- Swedish Defender of the Year: 2025
