= Abdoul Yoda (footballer, born 2000) =

Burkinabé footballer (born 2000)

Personal information
- Full name: Abdoul Said Razack Yoda
- Date of birth: 20 December 2000 (age 25)
- Place of birth: Bobo-Dioulasso, Burkina Faso
- Height: 1.82 m (6 ft 0 in)
- Position: Midfielder

Team information
- Current team: Milsami Orhei
- Number: 18

Senior career*
Years	Team	Apps	(Gls)
2017–2018	RC Kadiogo		
2018–2020	USFA		
2020–2021	TSV Hartberg	5	(0)
2021–2024	Hobro	73	(1)
2025–	Milsami Orhei	36	(1)

International career^{‡}
2025–	Burkina Faso	2	(0)
- * Club domestic league appearances and goals as of 14:05, 11 October 2025 (UTC) ‡ National team caps and goals as of 14:05, 11 October 2025 (UTC)

Abdoul Said Razack Yoda (born 20 December 2000) is a Burkinabé professional footballer who plays as a midfielder for Moldovan Super Liga club Milsami Orhei and the Burkina Faso national team.

== Career ==
=== TSV Hartberg ===
Yoda joined Austrian Football Bundesliga club TSV Hartberg on 11 September 2020 on a two-year deal with an option for one further year from USFA in Burkina Faso. He debuted for Hartberg on 20 September in the Austrian Football Bundesliga against Wolfsberger AC.

Yoda made six appearances for Hartberg in all competitions in the 2020–21 season, with a total of 265 minutes of playing time.

=== Hobro IK ===
On 31 August 2021, after a trial period, Yoda signed a three-year deal with Danish 1st Division club Hobro IK. He made his league debut for Hobro on 10 September against Esbjerg fB.

On May 23, 2024, Hobro confirmed that Yoda left the club at the end of June.
