= Rocco Ascone =

French footballer (born 2003)

Personal information
- Full name: Rocco Angelo Ascone
- Date of birth: 12 September 2003 (age 23)
- Place of birth: Villeneuve-d'Ascq, France
- Height: 1.80 m (5 ft 11 in)
- Position: Midfielder

Team information
- Current team: Halmstad
- Number: 27

Youth career
- 2008–2009: Villeneuve d'Ascq Metropole
- 2009–2010: Olympique Marcquois
- 2010–2011: Wasquehal
- 2011–2021: Lille

Senior career*
Years	Team	Apps	(Gls)
2021–2023	Lille	0	(0)
2022–2023	→ Nordsjælland (loan)	13	(2)
2023–2025	Nordsjælland	9	(0)
2025	→ Halmstad (loan)	11	(1)
2026–	Halmstad	23	(4)

International career
2019	France U16	2	(0)
2022	France U20	2	(0)
- * Club domestic league appearances and goals as of 28 October 2026

Rocco Angelo Ascone (born 12 September 2003) is a French footballer who plays as a midfielder for Allsvenskan club Halmstads BK.

== Career ==
Ascone started playing futsal as a three-year old with Villeneuve d'Ascq Metropole, before short stints with Olympique Marcquois and Wasquehal eventually led him to the academy of Ligue 1 side Lille, joining them as an eight-year old. Before the second half of the 2021–22 season, he was sent on loan to Nordsjælland in Denmark. On 27 February 2022, Ascone he made his debut for Nordsjælland during a 0–0 draw with Randers.

On 19 July 2023, FC Nordsjælland confirmed, that they had signed Ascone on a permanent deal, with the player signing a contract until June 2028.

On 5 August 2025, Halmstads BK announced that they had loaned Rocco until the end of the season, with an option to buy him. On 23 December 2025, the club announced that they had exercised their option to purchase, Ascone signing a contract until 2029.

== International career ==
Born in France, Ascone holds both French and Italian nationalities. He is a youth international for France, having represented the France U16s in 2019.

== Career statistics ==
As of match played 9 July 2026

Appearances and goals by club, season and competition
Club	Season	League			National cup (Note: Includes Coupe de France, Danish Cup)		Continental		Other		Total	
Club	Season	Division	Apps	Goals	Apps	Goals	Apps	Goals	Apps	Goals	Apps	Goals
Lille B	2020-21	Championnat National 3	3	1	—		—		—		3	1
Lille B	2021-22	Championnat National 3	5	0	—		—		—		5	0
Lille B	Total		8	1	0	0	0	0	0	0	8	1
Lille	2020-21	Ligue 1	0	0	0	0	0	0	—		0	0
Lille	2021-22	Ligue 1	0	0	0	0	0	0	0	0	0	0
Lille	Total		0	0	0	0	0	0	0	0	0	0
Nordsjælland (loan)	2021-22	Danish Superliga	1	0	0	0	—		—		1	0
Nordsjælland (loan)	2022-23	Danish Superliga	12	2	5	1	—		—		17	3
Nordsjælland (loan)	Total		13	2	5	1	0	0	0	0	18	3
Nordsjælland	2023-24	Danish Superliga	6	0	4	0	2 (Note: Appearance(s) in UEFA Europa Conference League)	0	—		12	0
Nordsjælland	2024-25	Danish Superliga	2	0	0	0	—		—		2	0
Nordsjælland	2025–26	Danish Superliga	1	0	0	0	—		—		1	0
Nordsjælland	Total		9	0	4	0	2	0	0	0	15	0
Halmstad (loan)	2025	Allsvenskan	11	1	0	0	—		—		11	1
Halmstad	2026	Allsvenskan	11	1	3	0	—		—		14	1
Career total			52	5	12	1	2	0	0	0	66	6
