= Kaare Barslund =

Danish footballer (born 2004)

Personal information
- Full name: Kaare Brøckner Barslund
- Date of birth: 23 March 2004 (age 22)
- Place of birth: Helsinge, Denmark
- Height: 1.82 m (6 ft 0 in)
- Position: Centre-back

Team information
- Current team: Brommapojkarna
- Number: 27

Youth career
- 2008–2015: Helsinge Fodbold
- 2015–2022: Nordsjælland

Senior career*
Years	Team	Apps	(Gls)
2022–2024	Nordsjælland	4	(0)
2024–	Brommapojkarna	48	(3)

International career^{‡}
2020	Denmark U16	1	(0)
2020	Denmark U17	1	(0)
2022	Denmark U18	2	(1)
2022–2023	Denmark U19	8	(0)
2023–2025	Denmark U20	9	(0)
- * Club domestic league appearances and goals as of 8 July 2026 ‡ National team caps and goals as of 13 June 2025

Kaare Brøckner Barslund (born 23 March 2004) is a Danish professional footballer who plays as a centre-back for Allsvenskan club IF Brommapojkarna.

== Career ==
=== Nordsjælland ===
Barslund is a product of FC Nordsjælland, which he joined from Helsinge Fodbold at the age of 11, and worked his way up through the club's youth ranks. He was called up for his first game for Nordsjælland's first team on 31 August 2022; a Danish Cup game against BK Frem. He got his debut for the club in the same game, as he came on from the bench for the second half of the game to replace Ulrik Yttergård Jenssen. Only 11 days later, on 11 September 2022, Barslund got his debut in the Danish Superliga, as he came on from the bench for the last four minutes against FC Midtjylland.

=== IF Brommapojkarna ===
In pursuit of more playing time, it was confirmed on 11 March 2024 that Barslund moved to Allsvenskan club IF Brommapojkarna.
