= 2019 CONCACAF Gold Cup Group A =

Football tournament group stage

Group A of the 2019 CONCACAF Gold Cup took place from 15 to 23 June 2019. The group consisted of Canada, Cuba, Martinique, and Mexico. The top two teams, Mexico and Canada, advanced to the knockout stage.

== Teams ==
Draw position	Team	Zone	Method of qualification	Date of qualification	Finals appearance	Last appearance	Previous best performance	CONCACAF Rankings		FIFA Rankings June 2019
Draw position	Team	Zone	Method of qualification	Date of qualification	Finals appearance	Last appearance	Previous best performance	September 2018 (Note: The CONCACAF rankings of September 2018 were used to determine the four seeded teams of the group stage.)	June 2019	FIFA Rankings June 2019
A1 (seed)	Mexico	NAFU	Hex 1st place	7 March 2018	15th	2017	Winners (1993, 1996, 1998, 2003, 2009, 2011, 2015)	1	1	18
A2	Canada	NAFU	CNLQ 2nd place	24 March 2019	14th	2017	Winners (2000)	7	6	78
A3	Martinique	CFU	CNLQ 3rd place	23 March 2019	6th	2017	Quarter-finals (2002)	12	12	N/A (Note: Martinique are not a FIFA member, and therefore do not have a FIFA Ranking.)
A4	Cuba	CFU	CNLQ 6th place	24 March 2019	9th	2015	Quarter-finals (2003, 2013, 2015)	13	13	175

== Standings ==
Pos	Team	Pld	W	D	L	GF	GA	GD	Pts	Qualification
1	Mexico	3	3	0	0	13	3	+10	9	Advance to knockout stage
2	Canada	3	2	0	1	12	3	+9	6	Advance to knockout stage
3	Martinique	3	1	0	2	5	7	−2	3	
4	Cuba	3	0	0	3	0	17	−17	0	

Source: CONCACAF
Rules for classification: Tiebreakers

In the quarter-finals:

- The winners of Group A, Mexico, advanced to play the runners-up of Group B, Costa Rica.
- The runners-up of Group A, Canada, advanced to play the winners of Group B, Haiti.

== Matches ==
=== Canada vs Martinique ===
15 June 2019
19:30 (16:30 UTC−7)

Canada	4–0	Martinique
David 33', 53'; Hoilett 63'; Arfield 67'	Report

Rose Bowl, Pasadena
Attendance: 65,527
Referee: Saíd Martínez (Honduras)

Canada	Martinique

GK	18	Milan Borjan
CB	13	Atiba Hutchinson
CB	4	Derek Cornelius
CB	6	Samuel Piette	(yellow card) 16'
RM	23	Marcus Godinho
CM	8	Scott Arfield (c)
CM	14	Mark-Anthony Kaye		(substituted off) 75'
CM	21	Jonathan Osorio
LM	12	Alphonso Davies		(substituted off) 70'
SS	10	Junior Hoilett		(substituted off) 64'
CF	20	Jonathan David
Substitutions:
FW	19	Lucas Cavallini		(substituted on) 64'
FW	11	Liam Millar		(substituted on) 70'
MF	7	Russell Teibert		(substituted on) 75'
Manager:
(England) John Herdman

GK	1	Loïc Chauvet
RB	5	Karl Vitulin
CB	8	Jordy Delem	(yellow card) 13'
CB	6	Jean-Sylvain Babin
LB	18	Samuel Camille
CM	19	Daniel Hérelle
CM	3	Joris Marveaux		(substituted off) 73'
RW	14	Yann Thimon		(substituted off) 76'
AM	20	Stéphane Abaul (c)
LW	9	Kévin Fortuné		(substituted off) 64'
CF	17	Kévin Parsemain
Substitutions:
FW	10	Mickaël Biron		(substituted on) 64'
FW	13	Christophe Jougon		(substituted on) 73'
FW	12	Johnny Marajo		(substituted on) 76'
Manager:
Mario Bocaly

Man of the Match:
Jonathan David (Canada)

Assistant referees:
Walter López (Honduras)
Helpys Feliz (Dominican Republic)
Fourth official:
Jose Kellys (Panama)

=== Mexico vs Cuba ===
15 June 2019
22:00 (19:00 UTC−7)

Mexico	7–0	Cuba
Antuna 2', 44', 80'; Jiménez 31', 64'; Reyes 38'; Vega 74'	Report

Rose Bowl, Pasadena
Attendance: 65,527
Referee: John Pitti (Panama)

Mexico	Cuba

GK	13	Guillermo Ochoa
RB	21	Luis Rodríguez
CB	2	Néstor Araujo
CB	3	Carlos Salcedo	(substituted off) 77'
LB	23	Jesús Gallardo
CM	8	Carlos Rodríguez
CM	5	Diego Reyes
CM	18	Andrés Guardado (c)
RF	11	Roberto Alvarado	(substituted off) 65'
CF	9	Raúl Jiménez	(substituted off) 72'
LF	22	Uriel Antuna
Substitutions:
MF	7	Orbelín Pineda	(substituted on) 65'
FW	14	Alexis Vega	(substituted on) 72'
DF	17	César Montes	(substituted on) 77'
Manager:
(Argentina) Gerardo Martino

GK	1	Sandy Sánchez
CB	6	Yosel Piedra
CB	4	Yasmany López (c)
CB	14	Karel Espino		(substituted off) 87'
RWB	15	Lionis Martínez
LWB	5	Dariel Morejón		(substituted off) 57'
RM	7	Rolando Abreu
CM	2	Andy Baquero
CM	20	Luismel Morris	(yellow card) 39'	(substituted off) 66'
LM	10	Arichel Hernández
CF	23	Luis Paradela
Substitutions:
MF	16	Daniel Luis		(substituted on) 57'
MF	13	Aníbal Álvarez		(substituted on) 66'
MF	8	Alejandro Portal		(substituted on) 87'
Manager:
Raúl Mederos

Man of the Match:
Uriel Antuna (Mexico)

Assistant referees:
Christian Ramírez (Honduras)
Henri Pupiro (Nicaragua)
Fourth official:
Keylor Herrera (Costa Rica)

=== Cuba vs Martinique ===
19 June 2019
20:00 (18:00 UTC−6)

Cuba	0–3	Martinique
	Report	Marveaux 45'; Abaul 70'; Fortuné 84'

Broncos Stadium at Mile High, Denver
Attendance: 52,874
Referee: Abdulrahman Al-Jassim (Qatar)

Cuba	Martinique

GK	1	Sandy Sánchez
RB	3	Erick Rizo	(yellow card) 74' (yellow-red card) 81'
CB	6	Yosel Piedra
CB	16	Daniel Luis	(yellow card) 58'
LB	5	Dariel Morejón
RM	9	Maikel Reyes
CM	14	Karel Espino	(yellow card) 21'	(substituted off) 44'
CM	2	Andy Baquero
LM	22	Roberney Caballero		(substituted off) 66'
CF	10	Arichel Hernández (c)
CF	23	Luis Paradela		(substituted off) 88'
Substitutions:
MF	13	Aníbal Álvarez	(yellow card) 64'	(substituted on) 44'
MF	18	Reynaldo Pérez		(substituted on) 66'
MF	8	Alejandro Portal		(substituted on) 88'
Manager:
Raúl Mederos

GK	1	Loïc Chauvet
RB	18	Samuel Camille	(yellow card) 82'
CB	22	Romario Barthéléry		(substituted off) 76'
CB	8	Jordy Delem
LB	6	Jean-Sylvain Babin
CM	3	Joris Marveaux	(yellow card) 26'	(substituted off) 89'
CM	10	Mickaël Biron	(yellow card) 39'	(substituted off) 59'
RW	19	Daniel Hérelle
AM	20	Stéphane Abaul (c)
LW	9	Kévin Fortuné
CF	17	Kévin Parsemain
Substitutions:
FW	12	Johnny Marajo		(substituted on) 59'
DF	2	Yordan Thimon		(substituted on) 76'
FW	7	Grégory Pastel		(substituted on) 89'
Manager:
Mario Bocaly

Man of the Match:
Kévin Fortuné (Martinique)

Assistant referees:
Taleb Al Marri (Qatar)
Saoud Al Maqaleh (Qatar)
Fourth official:
Ismail Elfath (United States)

=== Mexico vs Canada ===
19 June 2019
22:30 (20:30 UTC−6)

Mexico	3–1	Canada
Alvarado 40'; Guardado 54', 77'	Report	Cavallini 75'

Broncos Stadium at Mile High, Denver
Attendance: 52,874
Referee: Henry Bejarano (Costa Rica)

Mexico	Canada

GK	13	Guillermo Ochoa (c)
RB	21	Luis Rodríguez
CB	2	Néstor Araujo
CB	5	Diego Reyes
LB	23	Jesús Gallardo
CM	6	Jonathan dos Santos	(substituted off) 73'
CM	4	Edson Álvarez
CM	16	Érick Gutiérrez	(substituted off) 37'
RF	22	Uriel Antuna
CF	9	Raúl Jiménez
LF	11	Roberto Alvarado	(substituted off) 68'
Substitutions:
MF	18	Andrés Guardado	(substituted on) 37'
MF	10	Luis Montes	(substituted on) 68'
MF	8	Carlos Rodríguez	(substituted on) 73'
Manager:
(Argentina) Gerardo Martino

GK	18	Milan Borjan
RB	13	Atiba Hutchinson (c)
CB	4	Derek Cornelius
CB	15	Doneil Henry
LB	7	Russell Teibert		(substituted off) 60'
RM	2	Zachary Brault-Guillard
CM	14	Mark-Anthony Kaye	(yellow card) 79'
CM	5	Will Johnson		(substituted off) 60'
LM	12	Alphonso Davies
CF	19	Lucas Cavallini
CF	9	Cyle Larin		(substituted off) 57'
Substitutions:
FW	20	Jonathan David		(substituted on) 57'
MF	21	Jonathan Osorio		(substituted on) 60'
MF	8	Scott Arfield		(substituted on) 60'
Manager:
(England) John Herdman

Man of the Match:
Andrés Guardado (Mexico)

Assistant referees:
William Arrieta (Costa Rica)
Helpys Feliz (Dominican Republic)
Fourth official:
Randy Encarnación (Dominican Republic)

=== Canada vs Cuba ===
23 June 2019
18:00

Canada	7–0	Cuba
David 3', 71', 77'; Cavallini 21', 43', 45+1'; Hoilett 50'	Report

Bank of America Stadium, Charlotte
Attendance: 59,283
Referee: Armando Villarreal (United States)

Canada	Cuba

GK	18	Milan Borjan
RB	23	Marcus Godinho
CB	4	Derek Cornelius
CB	15	Doneil Henry		(substituted off) 61'
LB	12	Alphonso Davies		(substituted off) 70'
DM	6	Samuel Piette
CM	8	Scott Arfield (c)	(yellow card) 19'
CM	21	Jonathan Osorio
RF	19	Lucas Cavallini		(substituted off) 61'
CF	20	Jonathan David
LF	10	Junior Hoilett
Substitutions:
DF	17	Kamal Miller		(substituted on) 61'
DF	3	Ashtone Morgan		(substituted on) 61'
FW	11	Liam Millar		(substituted on) 70'
Manager:
(England) John Herdman

GK	1	Sandy Sánchez
RB	6	Yosel Piedra	(yellow card) 55'
CB	5	Dariel Morejón	(yellow card) 6'
CB	2	Andy Baquero
LB	13	Aníbal Álvarez		(substituted off) 54'
CM	8	Alejandro Portal		(substituted off) 76'
CM	10	Arichel Hernández (c)
CM	19	Jorge Kindelán
RF	9	Maikel Reyes
CF	23	Luis Paradela	(yellow card) 29'	(substituted off) 70'
LF	22	Roberney Caballero
Substitutions:
DF	14	Karel Espino		(substituted on) 54'
MF	17	Jean Carlos Rodríguez		(substituted on) 70'
MF	7	Rolando Abreu		(substituted on) 76'
Manager:
Raúl Mederos

Man of the Match:
Jonathan David (Canada)

Assistant referees:
Frank Anderson (United States)
Ian Anderson (United States)
Fourth official:
Jair Marrufo (United States)

=== Martinique vs Mexico ===
23 June 2019
20:30

Martinique	2–3	Mexico
Parsemain 56'; Delem 84'	Report	Antuna 29'; Jiménez 61'; Navarro 72'

Bank of America Stadium, Charlotte
Attendance: 59,283
Referee: Iván Barton (El Salvador)

Martinique	Mexico

GK	1	Loïc Chauvet
RB	6	Jean-Sylvain Babin
CB	8	Jordy Delem	(yellow card) 10'
CB	18	Samuel Camille
LB	14	Yann Thimon	(yellow card) 32'	(substituted off) 79'
RM	3	Joris Marveaux		(substituted off) 14'
CM	19	Daniel Hérelle
CM	20	Stéphane Abaul (c)
LM	22	Romario Barthéléry
CF	9	Kévin Fortuné		(substituted off) 68'
CF	17	Kévin Parsemain
Substitutions:
DF	15	Audrick Linord		(substituted on) 14'
FW	12	Johnny Marajo		(substituted on) 68'
MF	13	Christophe Jougon	(yellow card) 87'	(substituted on) 79'
Manager:
Mario Bocaly

GK	1	Jonathan Orozco
RB	19	Fernando Navarro
CB	3	Carlos Salcedo
CB	17	César Montes
LB	23	Jesús Gallardo
CM	8	Carlos Rodríguez
CM	4	Edson Álvarez
CM	18	Andrés Guardado (c)	(yellow card) 36'	(substituted off) 67'
RF	22	Uriel Antuna
CF	9	Raúl Jiménez		(substituted off) 77'
LF	11	Roberto Alvarado		(substituted off) 46'
Substitutions:
FW	20	Rodolfo Pizarro		(substituted on) 46'
MF	6	Jonathan dos Santos		(substituted on) 67'
MF	14	Alexis Vega		(substituted on) 77'
Manager:
(Argentina) Gerardo Martino			(yellow card) 86'

Man of the Match:
Uriel Antuna (Mexico)

Assistant referees:
Juan Zumba (El Salvador)
David Morán (El Salvador)
Fourth official:
José Kellys (Panama)

== Discipline ==
Fair play points would have been used as tiebreakers if the overall and head-to-head records of teams were tied. These were calculated based on yellow and red cards received in all group matches as follows:

- first yellow card: minus 1 point;
- indirect red card (second yellow card): minus 3 points;
- direct red card: minus 4 points;
- yellow card and direct red card: minus 5 points;

Only one of the above deductions were applied to a player in a single match.

Team	Match 1				Match 2				Match 3				Points
Team	Booked	(yellow card) (yellow-red card)	Sent off (straight red)	(yellow card) (red card)	Booked	(yellow card) (yellow-red card)	Sent off (straight red)	(yellow card) (red card)	Booked	(yellow card) (yellow-red card)	Sent off (straight red)	(yellow card) (red card)	Points
Mexico									1				–1
Canada	1				1				1				−3
Martinique	1				3				3				−7
Cuba	1				3	1			3				−10
