= Martinique at the CONCACAF Gold Cup =

The CONCACAF Gold Cup is North America's major tournament in senior men's football and determines the continental champion. Until 1989, the tournament was known as CONCACAF Championship. It is currently held every two years. From 1996 to 2005, nations from other confederations have regularly joined the tournament as invitees. In earlier editions, the continental championship was held in different countries, but since the inception of the Gold Cup in 1991, the United States are constant hosts or co-hosts.

From 1973 to 1989, the tournament doubled as the confederation's World Cup qualification. CONCACAF's representative team at the FIFA Confederations Cup was decided by a play-off between the winners of the last two tournament editions in 2015 via the CONCACAF Cup, but was then discontinued along with the Confederations Cup. As Non-FIFA members, Martinique were not able to qualify for the Confederations Cup, even if they had won the tournament.

Since the inaugural tournament in 1963, the continental championship was held 27 times and has been won by seven different nations, most often by Mexico (12 titles).

The Martinican football federation has been an associate member of CONCACAF only since 1991, which enabled them to enter the qualification stage for the inaugural CONCACAF Gold Cup when the CONCACAF Championship was rebranded under that name. Since then, they have qualified for eight tournaments, which puts them among the more successful Caribbean teams in tournament history. They qualified for the knockout stage once, in 2002, after a 1–0 victory against Trinidad and Tobago.

In their first tournament match in 1993, Martinique was on the receiving end of a 9–0 defeat to Mexico, still the highest victory in tournament history. Seven of those goals were scored by striker Luís Roberto Alves, another unique record.

== Overall record ==
| CONCACAF Championship & Gold Cup record | | | | | | | | | | Qualification record | | | | | |
| Year | Result | Position | Pld | W | D | L | GF | GA | Squad | Pld | W | D | L | GF | GA |
|---|---|---|---|---|---|---|---|---|---|---|---|---|---|---|---|
| (El Salvador) 1963 | Not a CONCACAF member | | | | | | | | | Not a CONCACAF member | | | | | |
| (Guatemala) 1965 | Not a CONCACAF member | | | | | | | | | Not a CONCACAF member | | | | | |
| (Honduras) 1967 | Not a CONCACAF member | | | | | | | | | Not a CONCACAF member | | | | | |
| (Costa Rica) 1969 | Not a CONCACAF member | | | | | | | | | Not a CONCACAF member | | | | | |
| (Trinidad and Tobago) 1971 | Not a CONCACAF member | | | | | | | | | Not a CONCACAF member | | | | | |
| (Haiti) 1973 | Not a CONCACAF member | | | | | | | | | Not a CONCACAF member | | | | | |
| (Mexico) 1977 | Not a CONCACAF member | | | | | | | | | Not a CONCACAF member | | | | | |
| (Honduras) 1981 | Not a CONCACAF member | | | | | | | | | Not a CONCACAF member | | | | | |
| 1985 | Not a CONCACAF member | | | | | | | | | Not a CONCACAF member | | | | | |
| 1989 | Not a CONCACAF member | | | | | | | | | Not a CONCACAF member | | | | | |
| (United States) 1991 | Did not qualify | | | | | | | | | 5 | 2 | 1 | 2 | 8 | 5 |
| (United States) (Mexico) 1993 | Group stage | 8th | 3 | 0 | 1 | 2 | 3 | 14 | Squad | 7 | 5 | 2 | 0 | 15 | 6 |
| (United States) 1996 | Did not qualify | | | | | | | | | 3 | 1 | 1 | 1 | 5 | 4 |
| (United States) 1998 | Did not qualify | | | | | | | | | 6 | 5 | 0 | 1 | 19 | 5 |
| (United States) 2000 | Did not qualify | | | | | | | | | 9 | 4 | 0 | 5 | 18 | 20 |
| (United States) 2002 | Quarter-finals | 6th | 3 | 1 | 1 | 1 | 2 | 3 | Squad | 7 | 5 | 1 | 2 | 20 | 5 |
| (United States) (Mexico) 2003 | Group stage | 12th | 2 | 0 | 0 | 2 | 0 | 3 | Squad | 6 | 3 | 1 | 2 | 16 | 10 |
| (United States) 2005 | Did not qualify | | | | | | | | | 5 | 2 | 2 | 1 | 7 | 3 |
| (United States) 2007 | Did not qualify | | | | | | | | | 9 | 5 | 1 | 3 | 11 | 12 |
| (United States) 2009 | Did not qualify | | | | | | | | | 5 | 3 | 1 | 1 | 10 | 6 |
| (United States) 2011 | Did not qualify | | | | | | | | | 3 | 0 | 1 | 2 | 1 | 3 |
| (United States) 2013 | Group stage | 10th | 3 | 1 | 0 | 2 | 2 | 4 | Squad | 11 | 5 | 5 | 1 | 34 | 10 |
| (United States) (Canada) 2015 | Did not qualify | | | | | | | | | 9 | 5 | 3 | 1 | 19 | 11 |
| (United States) 2017 | Group stage | 9th | 3 | 1 | 0 | 2 | 4 | 6 | Squad | 6 | 5 | 1 | 0 | 17 | 2 |
| (United States) (Costa Rica) (Jamaica) 2019 | Group stage | 12th | 3 | 1 | 0 | 2 | 5 | 7 | Squad | 4 | 4 | 0 | 0 | 10 | 2 |
| (United States) 2021 | Group stage | 15th | 3 | 0 | 0 | 3 | 3 | 12 | Squad | 4 | 0 | 3 | 1 | 4 | 5 |
| (United States) (Canada) 2023 | Group stage | 11th | 3 | 1 | 0 | 2 | 7 | 9 | Squad | 6 | 2 | 1 | 3 | 6 | 10 |
| (United States) (Canada) 2025 | Did not qualify | | | | | | | | | 6 | 1 | 2 | 3 | 4 | 7 |
| Total | Quarter-finals | 8/28 | 23 | 5 | 2 | 16 | 26 | 58 | | 111 | 57 | 26 | 28 | 224 | 126 |

=== Match overview ===
| Tournament | Round | Opponent | Score | Venue |
|---|---|---|---|---|
| (Mexico) (United States) 1993 | Group stage | Mexico | 0–9 | Mexico City |
| (Mexico) (United States) 1993 | Group stage | Canada | 2–2 | Mexico City |
| (Mexico) (United States) 1993 | Group stage | Costa Rica | 1–3 | Mexico City |
| (United States) 2002 | Group stage | Costa Rica | 0–2 | Miami |
| (United States) 2002 | Group stage | Trinidad and Tobago | 1–0 | Miami |
| (United States) 2002 | Quarter-finals | Canada | 1–1 (5–6 p) | Miami |
| (United States) (Mexico) 2003 | Group stage | United States | 0–2 | Foxboro |
| (United States) (Mexico) 2003 | Group stage | El Salvador | 0–1 | Foxboro |
| (United States) 2013 | Group stage | Canada | 1–0 | Pasadena |
| (United States) 2013 | Group stage | Panama | 0–1 | Seattle |
| (United States) 2013 | Group stage | Mexico | 1–3 | Denver |
| (United States) 2017 | Group stage | Nicaragua | 2–0 | Nashville |
| (United States) 2017 | Group stage | United States | 2–3 | Tampa |
| (United States) 2017 | Group stage | Panama | 0–3 | Cleveland |
| (United States) (Costa Rica) (Jamaica) 2019 | Group stage | Canada | 0–4 | Pasadena |
| (United States) (Costa Rica) (Jamaica) 2019 | Group stage | Cuba | 3–0 | Denver |
| (United States) (Costa Rica) (Jamaica) 2019 | Group stage | Mexico | 2–3 | Charlotte |
| (United States) 2021 | Group stage | Canada | 1–4 | Kansas City |
| (United States) 2021 | Group stage | United States | 1–6 | Kansas City |
| (United States) 2021 | Group stage | Haiti | 1–2 | Frisco |
| (United States) (Canada) 2023 | Group stage | El Salvador | 2–1 | Fort Lauderdale |
| (United States) (Canada) 2023 | Group stage | Panama | 1–2 | Harrison |
| (United States) (Canada) 2023 | Group stage | Costa Rica | 4–6 | Harrison |

== Record players ==
| Rank | Player | Matches | Gold Cups |
|---|---|---|---|
| 1 | Daniel Hérelle | 14 | 2013, 2017, 2019, 2021 and 2023 |
| 2 | Stéphane Abaul | 10 | 2013, 2017, 2019 and 2021 |
| 3 | Jean-Sylvain Babin | 9 | 2013, 2019 and 2021 |
| 3 | Sébastien Crétinoir | 9 | 2013, 2017, 2019 and 2021 |
| 3 | Kévin Parsemain | 9 | 2013, 2017 and 2019 |
| 3 | Kévin Fortuné | 9 | 2019, 2021 and 2023 |
| 7 | Jordy Delem | 7 | 2013, 2017 and 2019 |
| 7 | Christophe Jougon | 7 | 2017, 2019 and 2021 |
| 7 | Johnny Marajo | 7 | 2017, 2019 and 2021 |
| 7 | Karl Vitulin | 7 | 2017, 2019 and 2021 |

== Top goalscorers ==
Kévin Parsemain, who captained the Martinique national team in 2013 and 2017, is the top scoring Martiniquais player at CONCACAF Gold Cups, with five goals. In 2017, his three goals were enough to make him shared top-scorer of the tournament, although the Golden Boot award went to Canadian Alphonso Davies.

| Rank | Player | Goals | Gold Cups |
|---|---|---|---|
| 1 | Kévin Parsemain | 5 | 2013 (1), 2017 (3) and 2019 (1) |
| 2 | Kévin Fortuné | 3 | 2019, 2021 and 2023 |
| 2 | Patrick Burner | 3 | 2023 |
| 4 | Emmanuel Rivière | 2 | 2021 |
| 5 | Twelve players | 1 | Various |
