= Cuba national football team results (2020–present) =

This page details the match results and statistics of the Cuba national football team from 2020 to present.

Cuba were due to play French Guiana in a 2021 CONCACAF Gold Cup qualification match on 3 July 2021, but a 3–0 win was awarded to French Guiana as the Cuba team were not granted visas to enter the United States.

== Results ==
Cuba's score is shown first in each case.

Date	Venue	Opponents	Score	Competition	Cuba scorers	Att.	Ref.
24 March 2021	Estadio Doroteo Guamuch Flores, Guatemala City (A)	Guatemala	0–1	2022 FIFA World Cup qualification			
28 March 2021	Estadio Doroteo Guamuch Flores, Guatemala City (N)	Curaçao	1–2	2022 FIFA World Cup qualification	O. Hernández 27'	0	
2 June 2021	Estadio Doroteo Guamuch Flores, Guatemala City (N)	British Virgin Islands	5–0	2022 FIFA World Cup qualification	Paradela 33', O. Hernández 68', M. Reyes 76', Cavafe 80', D. Reyes 90' pen.	0	
8 June 2021	Kirani James Athletic Stadium, St. George's (N)	Saint Vincent and the Grenadines	1–0	2022 FIFA World Cup qualification	M. Reyes 64'	50	
10 November 2021	Nicaragua National Football Stadium, Managua (A)	Nicaragua	3–0	Friendly	M. Reyes 35', Piedra 42', Pozo-Venta 67'		
13 November 2021	Nicaragua National Football Stadium, Managua (A)	Nicaragua	0–2	Friendly			
24 March 2022	Estadio Pensativo, Antigua Guatemala (A)	Guatemala	0–1	Friendly			
27 March 2022	FFB Field, Belmopan (A)	Belize	3–0	Friendly	M. Hernández 48', 90', Espino 59'	950	
2 June 2022	Stade René Serge Nabajoth, Les Abymes (A)	Guadeloupe	1–2	2022–23 CONCACAF Nations League B	M. Reyes 74'		
5 June 2022	Estadio Antonio Maceo, Santiago de Cuba (H)	Barbados	3–0	2022–23 CONCACAF Nations League B	Pozo-Venta 35', A. Hernández 38', Paradela 47' pen.		
9 June 2022	Warner Park, Basseterre (N)	Antigua and Barbuda	2–0	2022–23 CONCACAF Nations League B	Paradela 16', O. Hernández 83'		
12 June 2022	Estadio Antonio Maceo, Santiago de Cuba (H)	Antigua and Barbuda	3–1	2022–23 CONCACAF Nations League B	A. Hernández 16', 20', 63'		
15 November 2022	Estadio Cibao, Santiago de los Caballeros (A)	Dominican Republic	4–2	Friendly	Flores 32', Pozo-Venta 66', Cavafe 76', A. Hernández 88'		
18 November 2022	Estadio Panamericano, San Cristóbal, (A)	Dominican Republic	1–1	Friendly	Palma 90+1'		
23 March 2023	Wildey Turf, Wildey (A)	Barbados	1–0	2022–23 CONCACAF Nations League B	Reyes 3'		
26 March 2023	Estadio Antonio Maceo, Santiago de Cuba (H)	Guadeloupe	1–0	2022–23 CONCACAF Nations League B	Matos 45+2'		
11 June 2023	Estadio Ester Roa, Concepción (A)	Chile	0–3	Friendly		27,000	
20 June 2023	Estadio Centenario, Montevideo (A)	Uruguay	0–2	Friendly		20,000	
27 June 2023	DRV PNK Stadium, Fort Lauderdale (N)	Guatemala	0–1	2023 Gold Cup		13,426	
1 July 2023	Shell Energy Stadium, Houston (N)	Guadeloupe	1–4	2023 Gold Cup	A. Hernández 62' pen.	19,766	
4 July 2023	Shell Energy Stadium, Houston (N)	Canada	2–4	2023 Gold Cup	Paradela 45+4' pen., Reyes 89' pen.	20,002	
8 September 2023	Estadio Panamericano, San Cristóbal (N)	Haiti	0–0	2023–24 CONCACAF Nations League A		550	
12 September 2023	Estadio Antonio Maceo, Santiago de Cuba (H)	Suriname	1–0	2023–24 CONCACAF Nations League A	Pozo-Venta 21'	3,500	
12 October 2023	Félix Sánchez Olympic Stadium, Santo Domingo (N)	Honduras	0–0	2023–24 CONCACAF Nations League A			
15 October 2023	Estadio Nacional Chelato Uclés, Tegucigalpa (A)	Honduras	0–4	2023–24 CONCACAF Nations League A		10,899	
20 November 2023	Volgograd Arena, Volgograd (A)	Russia	0–8	Friendly		40,706	
26 March 2024	Nicaragua National Football Stadium, Managua (A)	Nicaragua	1–0	Friendly	Reyes 81'		
6 June 2024	Estadio Nacional Chelato Uclés, Tegucigalpa (A)	Honduras	1–3	2026 FIFA World Cup qualification	Reyes 22'	10,111	
6 September 2024	Independence Park, Kingston (A)	Jamaica	0–0	2024–25 CONCACAF Nations League A		9,900	
10 September 2024	Estadio Antonio Maceo, Santiago de Cuba (H)	Nicaragua	1–1	2024–25 CONCACAF Nations League A	Espino 42' pen.	3,565	
10 October 2024	Estadio Antonio Maceo, Santiago de Cuba (H)	Trinidad and Tobago	2–2	2024–25 CONCACAF Nations League A	Reyes 64', Casanova 75'	4,500	
14 October 2024	Dwight Yorke Stadium, Bacolet (A)	Trinidad and Tobago	1–3	2024–25 CONCACAF Nations League A	Matos 62'	3,543	
14 November 2024	SKNFA Technical Center, Basseterre (A)	Saint Kitts and Nevis	1–2	2024–25 CONCACAF Nations League Play-in	Paradela 40'	459	
18 November 2024	Estadio Antonio Maceo, Santiago de Cuba (H)	Saint Kitts and Nevis	4–0	2024–25 CONCACAF Nations League Play-in	O. Hernández 40', Piedra 45+3', Paradela 50', Reyes 87' pen.	3,500	
21 March 2025	Estadio Antonio Maceo, Santiago de Cuba (H)	Trinidad and Tobago	1–2	2025 Gold Cup qualification	Matos 6'		
25 March 2025	Ato Boldon Stadium, Couva (A)	Trinidad and Tobago	0–4	2025 Gold Cup qualification			
6 June 2025	ABFA Technical Center, Piggotts (A)	Antigua and Barbuda	1–0	2026 FIFA World Cup qualification	Bravo 45+8'	428	
10 June 2025	Estadio Antonio Maceo, Santiago de Cuba (H)	Bermuda	1–2	2026 FIFA World Cup qualification	Aguirre 58'	3,600	
5 October 2025	Arnos Vale Stadium, Arnos Vale (A)	Saint Vincent and the Grenadines	0–7	Friendly			
8 October 2025	Arnos Vale Stadium, Arnos Vale (A)	Saint Vincent and the Grenadines	0–1	Friendly			
11 October 2025	St. George's, Grenada (A)	Grenada	0–2	Friendly			
12 November 2025	Santiago, Dominican Republic (H)	Saint Lucia	3–0	2025–26 CONCACAF Series	Torres 38', Matos 45+1', Reyes 53'		
15 November 2025	Santiago, Dominican Republic (H)	Martinique	2–0	2025–26 CONCACAF Series	Matos 41', Raballo 45'		
26 March 2026	Santiago, Dominican Republic (A)	Martinique	2–2	2025–26 CONCACAF Series	Paradela 22', Espino 50'		
29 March 2026	Santiago, Dominican Republic (A)	Dominican Republic	1–1	2025–26 CONCACAF Series	D. Reyes 51'		

== Head-to-head records ==
Cuba national football team head-to-head records (2020–present)
Opponent	Pld	W	D	L	GF	GA	GD	Pts	Confederation
Antigua and Barbuda	3	3	0	0	6	1	+5	9	CONCACAF
Barbados	2	2	0	0	4	0	+4	6	CONCACAF
Belize	1	1	0	0	3	0	+3	3	CONCACAF
Bermuda	1	0	0	1	1	2	–1	0	CONCACAF
British Virgin Islands	1	1	0	0	5	0	+5	3	CONCACAF
Canada	1	0	0	1	2	4	–2	0	CONCACAF
Chile	1	0	0	1	0	3	–3	0	CONMEBOL
Curaçao	1	0	0	1	1	2	–1	0	CONCACAF
Dominican Republic	3	1	2	0	6	4	+2	5	CONCACAF
Grenada	1	0	0	1	0	2	–2	0	CONCACAF
Guadeloupe	3	1	0	2	3	6	–3	3	CONCACAF
Guatemala	3	0	0	3	0	3	–3	0	CONCACAF
Haiti	1	0	1	0	0	0	0	1	CONCACAF
Honduras	3	0	1	2	1	7	–6	1	CONCACAF
Jamaica	1	0	1	0	0	0	0	1	CONCACAF
Martinique	2	1	1	0	4	2	+2	4	CONCACAF
Nicaragua	4	2	1	1	5	3	+2	7	CONCACAF
Russia	1	0	0	1	0	8	–8	0	UEFA
Saint Kitts and Nevis	2	1	0	1	5	2	+3	3	CONCACAF
Saint Lucia	1	1	0	0	3	0	+3	3	CONCACAF
Saint Vincent and the Grenadines	3	1	0	2	1	8	–7	3	CONCACAF
Suriname	1	1	0	0	1	0	+1	3	CONCACAF
Trinidad and Tobago	4	0	1	3	4	11	–7	1	CONCACAF
Uruguay	1	0	0	1	0	2	–2	0	CONMEBOL
