= 2019 CONCACAF Gold Cup final =

Final match of the 2019 edition of the CONCACAF Gold Cup

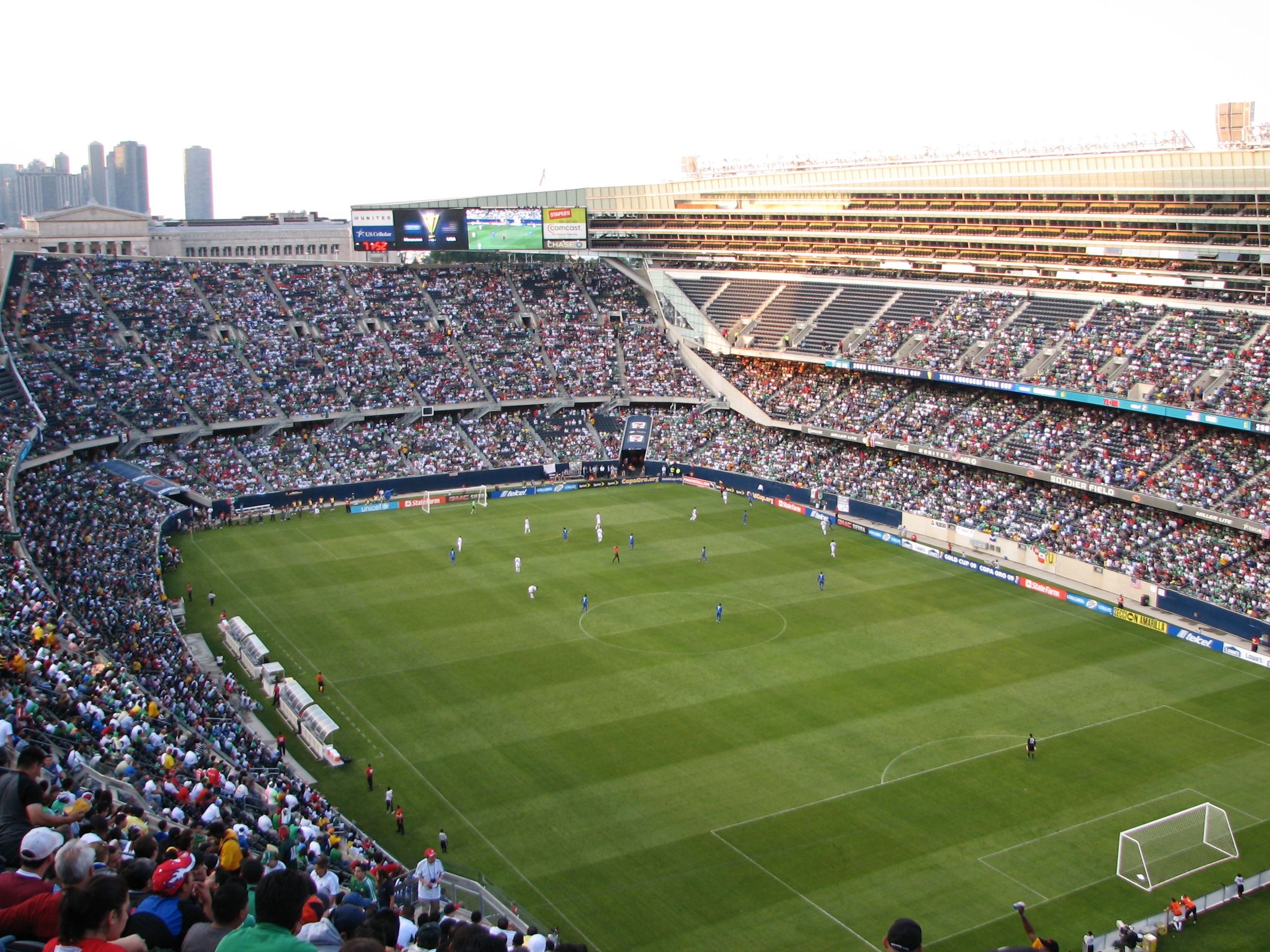
- Soldier Field in Chicago hosted the final.
- Event: 2019 CONCACAF Gold Cup
Mexico	United States
(Mexico)	(United States)
1	0
- Date: July 7, 2019
- Venue: Soldier Field, Chicago
- Man of the Match: Jonathan dos Santos (Mexico)
- Referee: Mario Escobar (Guatemala)
- Attendance: 62,493

The 2019 CONCACAF Gold Cup final was a soccer match which determined the winners of the 2019 CONCACAF Gold Cup. The match was held at Soldier Field in Chicago, Illinois, United States, on July 7, 2019, and was contested by Mexico and the United States.

It was the sixth Gold Cup final to be contested by Mexico and the United States, and the first since 2011. Mexico had won the modern Gold Cup seven times, while the United States had won it six times. Mexico won the final 1–0, the lone goal scored by Jonathan dos Santos in the second half, for their eighth Gold Cup title.

== Route to the final ==
Mexico
Round
United States
Opponents
Result
Group stage
Opponents
Result
Cuba
7–0
Match 1
Guyana
4–0
Canada
3–1
Match 2
Trinidad and Tobago
6–0
Martinique
3–2
Match 3
Panama
1–0
Group A winners

Pos	Team	Pld	Pts
1	Mexico	3	9
2	Canada	3	6
3	Martinique	3	3
4	Cuba	3	0

Source: CONCACAF
Final standings
Group D winners

Pos	Team	Pld	Pts
1	United States (H)	3	9
2	Panama	3	6
3	Guyana	3	1
4	Trinidad and Tobago	3	1

Source: CONCACAF
(H) Hosts
Opponents
Result
Knockout stage
Opponents
Result
Costa Rica
1–1 (a.e.t.) (5–4 p)
Quarter-finals
Curaçao
1–0
Haiti
1–0 (a.e.t.)
Semi-finals
Jamaica
3–1

=== Mexico ===
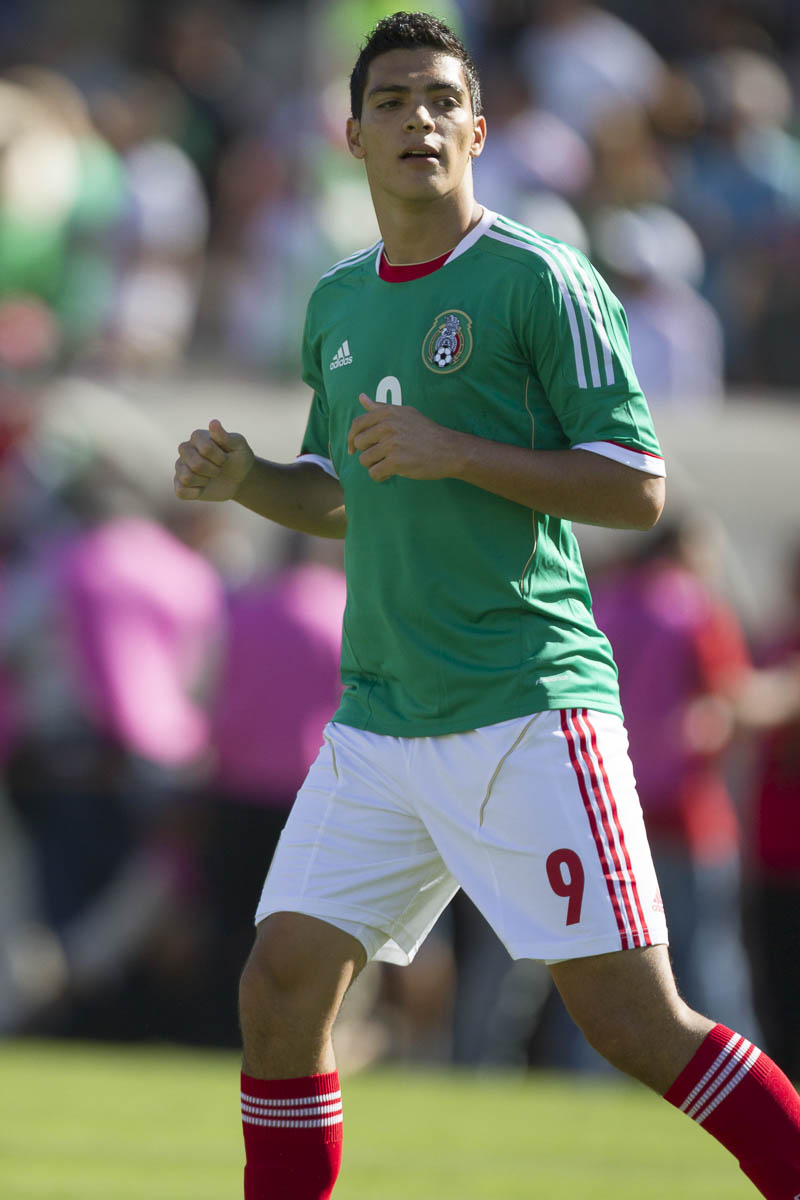
Forward Raúl Jiménez scored five goals for Mexico in the tournament.

Mexico, nicknamed El Tri, were the most successful team in the history of the Gold Cup, having won the tournament seven times since 1993, most recently in 2015. The team qualified automatically for the 2019 Gold Cup because of their participation in the final round of regional qualification for the 2018 World Cup. The tournament would be the first for the team under Gerardo "Tata" Martino, who took over as head coach in January 2019 after leaving Atlanta United FC of Major League Soccer (MLS). Martino named his preliminary roster in May, leaving out regular starters like Carlos Vela, Javier Hernández, Giovani dos Santos, Hirving Lozano, Jesus Manuel Corona, and Héctor Herrera due to requests for personal or recovery time from the players.

El Tri were drawn into Group A alongside Canada, Cuba, and Martinique—all of whom qualified through the Nations League preliminary rounds. In their opening match against Cuba at the Rose Bowl, Mexico won 7–0 with a hat-trick for Uriel Antuna of the local LA Galaxy, who was a late addition to the roster to replace the injured Jorge Sánchez, and two goals by Raúl Jiménez. The team then secured its quarter-final berth by defeating Canada 3–1 in Denver, with a first-half goal from midfielder Roberto Alvarado and a pair of second-half goals by substitute Andrés Guardado; Lucas Cavallini scored a consolation goal for the Canadians in the 75th minute, cutting the lead to 2–1 before Guardado's second goal. Martino opted to rest several starting players in the final group stage match against Martinique, which saw El Tri take the lead in the first half through a goal by Antuna but concede an equalizer to Martiniquais forward Kévin Parsemain's free kick in the 56th minute. Jiménez and defender Fernando Navarro added a pair of goals to win the match 3–2 for Mexico after Jordy Delem was able to score a consolation goal in the 84th minute for Martinique.

In the quarter-finals, Mexico played Group B runners-up Costa Rica in Houston. They took the lead before halftime with a goal by Jiménez, but conceded a penalty in the 52nd minute after a controversial foul on Joel Campbell; Costa Rican captain Bryan Ruiz scored from the penalty spot to level the match. Both teams had chances to score in regulation and extra time, including a shot by Jonathan McDonald that was saved by Mexican goalkeeper Guillermo Ochoa, but the score remained 1–1 and triggered a penalty shoot-out. Jiménez, the first kick-taker, had his shot stopped by Leonel Moreira, but a miss by Randall Leal kept the shootout even through five rounds; in the sixth round, Keysher Fuller's penalty was saved by Ochoa to give Mexico a 5–4 shoot-out victory.

Mexico advanced to the semi-finals to play Group B winners Haiti, who had upset Canada with a 3–2 comeback victory in the quarter-finals. Martino was suspended from the match due to yellow card accumulation. The match was scoreless at the end of regulation time despite several chances for Mexico, including two saves for goalkeeper Johny Placide. Jiménez was fouled in the penalty area and was awarded a penalty kick for Mexico, which he took and scored in the 93rd minute; Haiti were unable to equalize, missing a chance in the 119th minute that hit the crossbar, and Mexico advanced to the final with a 1–0 victory.

=== United States ===
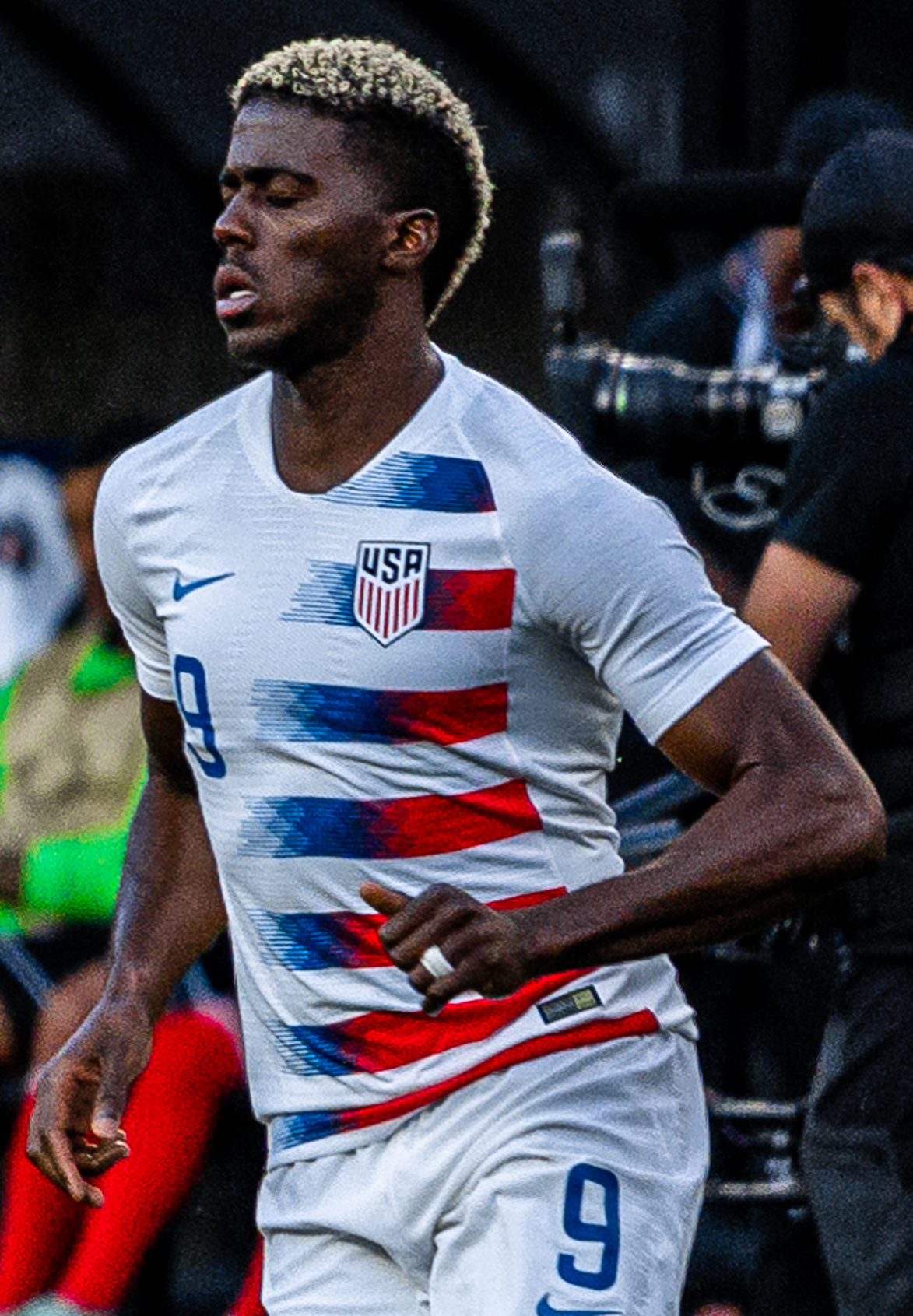
Gyasi Zardes scored three times for the United States during the group stage.

The United States, the primary host of the tournament, were the defending champions of the Gold Cup and the second most successful, with six titles in ten appearances in the final. They have a major rivalry with Mexico, who they met in five previous Gold Cup finals, winning only once. The U.S. qualified as another participant in the final round of World Cup qualification, where they missed the World Cup for the first time since 1986. Following a year with an interim manager, Gregg Berhalter of the Columbus Crew was hired as the team's head coach in December 2018; in his first four matches as head coach, the U.S. were unbeaten while playing against opponents from Central and South America with experimental lineups. Berhalter's preliminary Gold Cup roster excluded several holdover veterans, including defenders DeAndre Yedlin and John Brooks, and goalkeeper Bill Hamid; in the final roster, released after two exhibition losses, he opted to exclude young striker Josh Sargent in favor of Tyler Boyd, who had not played for the U.S. after switching allegiances from New Zealand.

The Americans were placed in Group D, playing against Gold Cup debutants Guyana, Panama, who qualified for the World Cup ahead of the U.S., and Trinidad and Tobago, who had defeated the U.S. in the final game of qualification and prevented them from participating in the World Cup. The United States opened against Guyana at Allianz Field in Minnesota, winning 4–0 with a first-half goal by Paul Arriola, two from Tyler Boyd in his second match for the team, and another by Gyasi Zardes that was scored with a deflection off his eye. The Americans won 6–0 in their match against Trinidad and Tobago in Cleveland, clinching them a place in the quarter-finals with two goals each from Zardes and Aaron Long, and one each from Christian Pulisic and Paul Arriola. A fully rotated U.S. squad closed out the group by defeating Panama 1–0 in Kansas City to finish at the top of the standings; Jozy Altidore scored the lone goal of the match in the 66th minute with a bicycle kick after Panama failed to clear a corner.

The U.S. faced Caribbean side Curaçao in the quarter-finals after the team had unexpectedly finished second in Group C on goal differential. The Americans took the lead in the 25th minute, with a header by Weston McKennie from 4 yards (3.7 m), and were held to a 1–0 win in Philadelphia. The semi-final fixture against Jamaica in Nashville, a rematch of the previous final, began with a goal for McKennie in the ninth minute to finish a long passing sequence, but the match was suspended in the 16th minute because of a lightning delay. It was resumed 90 minutes later and Jamaica were initially dominant, but conceded a goal to the U.S. in the 52nd minute, with Christian Pulisic finishing a rebound from goalkeeper Andre Blake, who had parried away a shot from Jordan Morris. Shamar Nicholson scored with a header in the 69th minute to cut the lead down to a one-goal margin, but Pulisic got his second goal in the 87th minute from another rebound off Blake. The U.S. won 3–1 and advanced to their second consecutive final, having conceded only one goal.

== Venue ==
The final was played at Soldier Field, an American football venue in Chicago, Illinois. The venue seats 61,500 spectators and is primarily used by the Chicago Bears of the National Football League, but had hosted the Chicago Fire of Major League Soccer in the past. Soldier Field hosted two previous Gold Cup finals in 2007 and 2013, the former featuring the United States and Mexico, as well as several matches at the 1994 FIFA World Cup, 1999 FIFA Women's World Cup, and the Copa América Centenario in 2016. CONCACAF announced its selection of Soldier Field as the venue for the final on September 27, 2018. The tickets for the match were sold out prior to the semi-finals and CONCACAF held special fan events at Union Station in the run-up to the final.

== Pre-match ==
=== Scheduling ===
The Gold Cup final was staged on the same day as the FIFA Women's World Cup final, which was played earlier in the day and involved the United States women's national team, and the Copa América final. The scheduling of the three events was criticized as an example of women's soccer being deprioritized by FIFA, who called it a "rare and exciting occurrence". CONCACAF president Victor Montagliani said that the scheduling of the Gold Cup final had been the result of a "clerical error" and that the conflict was not realized until it was too late to change. The timing of finals for both U.S. teams resulted in comparisons of their accolades, framed by an ongoing debate over a pay gap for the women's team.

== Match ==
=== Summary ===
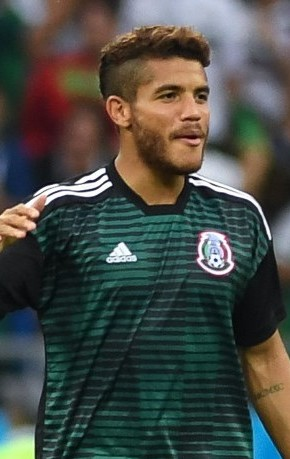
Jonathan dos Santos scored the only goal of the match.

The match began at 21:15 Central Time in front of a sold-out, pro-Mexican crowd of 62,493 at Soldier Field. Mexican midfielder Jonathan dos Santos made an attempt on goal in the first minute that was saved by Zack Steffen, but the majority of early chances fell to the United States. A run four minutes later into the six-yard box by Christian Pulisic resulted in a shot that was saved by goalkeeper Guillermo Ochoa, while an attempt by Jozy Altidore in the eighth minute was sent wide of the goal. Mexico gained control of midfield possession and produced another chance of its own in the 16th minute, with Rodolfo Pizarro sending a pass towards Mexico captain Andrés Guardado in the penalty area that was cleared away by Paul Arriola. Arriola had his own chance to score in the 31st minute, beating several defenders to an overhead ball in the penalty area and shooting across from a tight angle that rolled wide past the goal. Just before the conclusion of the first half, a foul caused on Pizarro caused him to fall on his elbow in an apparent injury but returned for the second half, with his elbow wrapped.

Early in the second half, Altidore was pushed and kneed in the back by Héctor Moreno, resulting in a confrontation with U.S. captain Weston McKennie, who was grabbed by the neck by Andres Guardado; no cards were shown by referee Mario Escobar, who was in front of McKennie during the incident. Five minutes later, a header by Jordan Morris on a U.S. corner kick was saved off the goal line by Guardado, which sparked a change in momentum in Mexico's favor. U.S. coach Gregg Berhalter brought on Cristian Roldan and Gyasi Zardes to regain control and stymie the Mexican attack, but to no avail. Dos Santos scored the lone goal of the match in the 73rd minute, receiving a short backheel pass from Raúl Jiménez and shooting from 16 yards (15 m) to beat Steffen. The U.S. missed several chances to equalize, including a sequence in the 88th minute in which Roldan shot off a rebound from Ochoa that was saved off the line by Guardado with his face.

=== Details ===
July 7, 2019
20:15 CDT

Mexico	1–0	United States
Dos Santos 73'	Report

Soldier Field, Chicago
Attendance: 62,493
Referee: Mario Escobar (Guatemala)

Mexico	United States

GK	13	Guillermo Ochoa
RB	21	Luis Rodríguez
CB	3	Carlos Salcedo
CB	15	Héctor Moreno
LB	23	Jesús Gallardo
CM	6	Jonathan dos Santos
CM	4	Edson Álvarez
CM	18	Andrés Guardado (c)	(substituted off) 89'
RF	22	Uriel Antuna	(substituted off) 86'
CF	9	Raúl Jiménez
LF	20	Rodolfo Pizarro	(substituted off) 81'
Substitutions:
MF	8	Carlos Rodríguez	(substituted on) 81'
FW	11	Roberto Alvarado	(substituted on) 86'
DF	5	Diego Reyes	(substituted on) 89'
Manager:
(Argentina) Gerardo Martino

GK	1	Zack Steffen
RB	14	Reggie Cannon
CB	19	Matt Miazga
CB	23	Aaron Long
LB	13	Tim Ream	(substituted off) 83'
CM	8	Weston McKennie (c)
CM	10	Christian Pulisic
CM	4	Michael Bradley
RF	11	Jordan Morris	(substituted off) 61'
CF	17	Jozy Altidore	(substituted off) 64'
LF	7	Paul Arriola
Substitutions:
MF	15	Cristian Roldan	(substituted on) 61'
FW	9	Gyasi Zardes	(substituted on) 64'
DF	16	Daniel Lovitz	(substituted on) 83'
Manager:
Gregg Berhalter

Man of the Match:
Jonathan dos Santos (Mexico)

Assistant referees:
William Arrieta (Costa Rica)
Humberto Panjoj (Guatemala)
Fourth official:
Juan Gabriel Calderón (Costa Rica)

Match rules

- 90 minutes.
- 30 minutes of extra time if necessary.
- Penalty shoot-out if scores still level.
- Maximum of twelve named substitutes.
- Maximum of three substitutions, with a fourth allowed in extra time.

== Post-match ==
Mexico won its eighth Gold Cup championship, including four of the past six editions. The match marked the end of a ten-match Gold Cup winning streak for the United States that began in 2017.
