= Karel Espino =

Cuban footballer (born 2001)

Personal information
- Full name: Karel Aldair Espino Contreras
- Date of birth: 27 October 2001 (age 25)
- Place of birth: San Cristóbal, Cuba
- Height: 1.88 m (6 ft 2 in)
- Position: Defensive midfielder

Team information
- Current team: Comunicaciones
- Number: 4

Senior career*
| Years | Team | Apps | (Gls) |
| 2019–2021 | Artemisa | 73 | (2) |
| 2021– | Comunicaciones | 140 | (5) |

International career^{‡}
| 2017 | Cuba U17 | 5 | (0) |
| 2018 | Cuba U20 | 4 | (0) |
| 2019– | Cuba | 29 | (2) |
- * Club domestic league appearances and goals as of 20:00, 28 January 2026 (UTC) ‡ National team caps and goals as of 20:00, 10 September 2024 (UTC)

Karel Aldair Espino Contreras (Spanish pronunciation: [kaɾˈel alðˈa͡ɪɾ espˈino kontɾˈeɾas]; born 27 October 2001) is a Cuban professional footballer who plays as a defensive midfielder for Liga Bantrab club Comunicaciones and captains the Cuba national team.

Debuting for Artemisa in 2019, Espino would go on to sign for Comunicaciones two years later. He has gone on to make over 100 appearances for the club, as well as scoring four goals. Espino has also won two league titles, along with one CONCACAF League title with Comunicaciones.

Having previously been capped by the U17 and U20 teams, Espino made his senior debut in 2019 at the age of 17. He also been part of Cuba's squads for the 2019 and 2023 CONCACAF Gold Cup.

== Club career ==
=== Comunicaciones ===
==== 2021–22: Debut season, CONCACAF League title, and first league title ====
On 1 July 2021, Comunicaciones had announced the official signing of Espino. He made his debut and scored his first goal for the club in a 4–0 win over Sololá on 1 August. Four days later, Espino started in the preliminary round of the 2021 CONCACAF League against Once Deportivo, where he received a yellow card at the 90th minute in a 1–1 draw.

== International career ==
Espino made his Cuba national football team debut on 27 February 2019 in a friendly against Bermuda, as a 79th-minute substitute for Yasmany López, at the age of 17 years and 120 days old.

On 13 June, he was selected for the country's 2019 CONCACAF Gold Cup squad by Raúl Mederos. In the first match of Group A, Espino was subbed off at the 87th minute for Alejandro Portal in the 7–0 loss against Mexico. In the second match on 19 June, Espino received a yellow card at the 21st minute in a 3–0 defeat to Martinique. In the third match against Canada, Espino was subbed on at the 58th minute for Aníbal Álvarez in another 7–0 loss, as Cuba ended their campaign.

== Career statistics ==
=== International goals ===
| No. | Date | Venue | Opponent | Score | Result | Competition |
|---|---|---|---|---|---|---|
| 1. | 27 March 2022 | FFB Field, Belmopan, Belize | Belize | 2–0 | 3–0 | Friendly |
| 2. | 10 September 2024 | Estadio Antonio Maceo, Santiago de Cuba, Cuba | Nicaragua | 1–0 | 1–1 | 2024–25 CONCACAF Nations League A |

== Honours ==
Comunicaciones

- Liga Nos Une: 2022 Clausura, 2023 Apertura
- CONCACAF League: 2021
