= Dariel Morejón =

Cuban footballer

Personal information
- Full name: Dariel Alejandro Morejón Rodríguez
- Date of birth: 22 December 1998 (age 27)
- Place of birth: Santa Clara, Cuba
- Height: 1.74 m (5 ft 9 in)
- Position: Defender

Team information
- Current team: AD Municipal Santa Ana
- Number: 4

Senior career*
Years	Team	Apps	(Gls)
2017–2018	Villa Clara		
2018	Ciego de Ávila		
2019–	Villa Clara		

International career^{‡}
2017	Cuba U20	3	(0)
2018–	Cuba	18	(0)
- * Club domestic league appearances and goals ‡ National team caps and goals as of 19 June 2019

Dariel Alejandro Morejón Rodríguez (born 22 December 1998) is a Cuban football player. He plays for A.D. Municipal Santa Ana in the Primera División de Costa Rica.

== International ==
He made his Cuba national football team debut on 26 August 2018 in a friendly against Barbados, as a 79th-minute substitute for Yosel Piedra.

He was selected for his country's 2019 CONCACAF Gold Cup squad.
