= Akel Clarke =

Guyanese football player

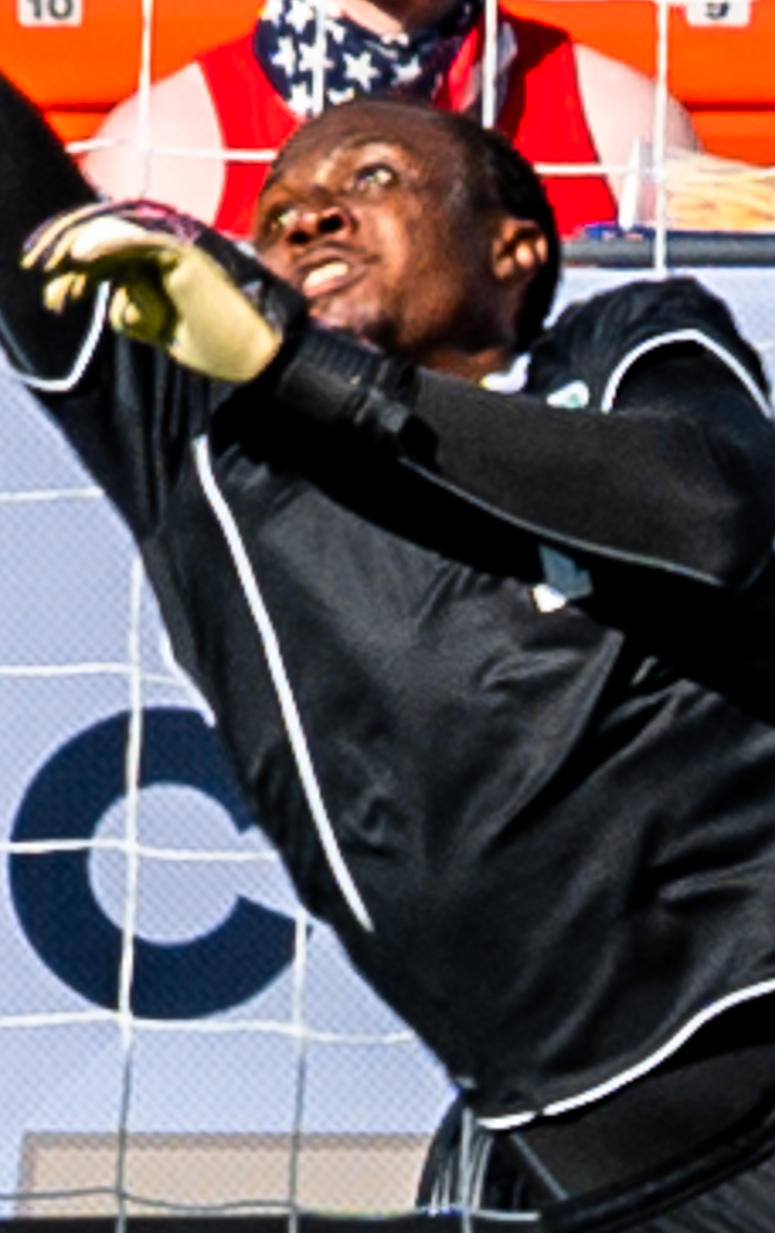
- Clarke with Guyana at the 2019 CONCACAF Gold Cup

Personal information
- Full name: Akel Kayode Clarke
- Date of birth: 25 October 1988 (age 38)
- Place of birth: Georgetown, Guyana
- Height: 1.72 m (5 ft 8 in)
- Position: Goalkeeper

Team information
- Current team: Mount Pleasant Football Academy

Senior career*
Years	Team	Apps	(Gls)
2009–2012	Defence Force		
2012–2014	St. Ann's Rangers		
2014–2017	Central		
2017–2018	North East Stars		
2018	Fruta Conquerors		
2019–2020	Walking Boyz Company		
2020-	Mount Pleasant Football Academy		

International career^{‡}
2011–	Guyana	6	(0)
- * Club domestic league appearances and goals ‡ National team caps and goals as of 18 June 2019

Akel Kayode Clarke (born 25 October 1988) is a professional Guyanese football player. He plays in Jamaica for Mount Pleasant Football Academy.

== Career ==
=== Club ===
Clarke has played club football in Guyana, Trinidad, Suriname and Jamaica

=== International ===
He made his Guyana national football team debut on 29 May 2011 in a friendly against Barbados, as a starter.

He was selected for Guayana's 2019 CONCACAF Gold Cup squad and started the country's very first game in the history of the tournament against the United States on 18 June 2019.

Despite cancellation of a match in Barbados for the CONCACACF 2021 Gold Cup Qualifiers in March 2020, Clarke maintained a training regiment in preparation for a return to football after COVID-19. Late 2020 he signed with the Red Stripe Premier League club Mount Pleasant Football Academy (based in St. Ann, Jamaica) after release from Western Tigers.
