= Samuel Camille =

Martiniquais professional footballer (born 1986)

Personal information
- Full name: Samuel Geoffroy Camille
- Date of birth: 2 February 1986 (age 40)
- Place of birth: Saint-Denis, France
- Height: 1.76 m (5 ft 9 in)
- Position: Left back

Team information
- Current team: Olympique Valence

Youth career
- 2004–2005: ASOA Valence

Senior career*
Years	Team	Apps	(Gls)
2005–2009	Lens B		
2009	Rayo Vallecano B	0	(0)
2009–2010	Rayo Vallecano	4	(0)
2010–2011	Córdoba	32	(0)
2011–2012	Granada	0	(0)
2011–2012	→ Cádiz (loan)	17	(0)
2012–2014	Alcorcón	43	(1)
2014–2016	Ponferradina	36	(0)
2016–2019	Tenerife	71	(0)
2019–	Olympique Valence		

International career^{‡}
2019–	Martinique	8	(0)
- * Club domestic league appearances and goals as of 18 May 2019 ‡ National team caps and goals as of 18 July 2021

Samuel Geoffroy Camille (born 2 February 1986) is a footballer who plays as a left back for French club Olympique de Valence. Born in metropolitan France, he represents Martinique at international level.

He spent his entire professional career in Spain, representing five Segunda División clubs and appearing in 186 matches in the process.

== Club career ==
Born in Saint-Denis, Seine-Saint-Denis, Paris, Camille began his senior career with RC Lens, but spent the vast majority of his four-year spell with the reserves. He made his debut with the first team on 24 September 2008, as a 67th-minute substitute in a 3–0 away win against FC Lorient in the third round of the Coupe de la Ligue.

In June 2009, after an unsuccessful trial with Atlético Madrid, Camille signed a contract with Rayo Vallecano also in Spain, being assigned to the reserve team in Tercera División. He was definitely promoted in September, and made his first appearance with the main squad on 14 November 2009, playing the full 90 minutes in a 2–0 home victory over Real Murcia.

Camille joined fellow Segunda División club Córdoba CF on 8 July 2010, being first choice in his only season. He moved to Granada CF afterwards, being immediately loaned to Andalusia neighbours Cádiz CF in Segunda División B.

On 6 August 2012, Camille signed with second-division AD Alcorcón. After featuring regularly, he agreed to a deal at SD Ponferradina of the same league on 16 July 2014.

Camille scored his only goal as a professional on 1 September 2013, helping hosts Alcorcón defeat Recreativo de Huelva 3–0 after just a few seconds of taking the field. Before leaving Spain at the age of 33, he also had a three-year spell in the second tier with CD Tenerife.

== International career ==
On 20 May 2019, Camille was named to Martinique's 40-man provisional squad for the 2019 CONCACAF Gold Cup, being included in the final team on 7 June. He made his debut in the competition the following week, starting in the 4–0 loss against Canada in the first matchday.

Camille also played for the Martinique team in the 2021 Gold Cup, in another group-stage exit.
