= 2019 CONCACAF Gold Cup Group D =

Football tournament group stage

Group D of the 2019 CONCACAF Gold Cup took place from 18 to 26 June 2019. The group consisted of Guyana, Panama, Trinidad and Tobago, and was co-hosted by the United States, the defending champions of the competition. The top two teams, the United States and Panama, advanced to the knockout stage.

== Teams ==
Draw position	Team	Zone	Method of qualification	Date of qualification	Finals appearance	Last appearance	Previous best performance	CONCACAF Rankings		FIFA Rankings June 2019
Draw position	Team	Zone	Method of qualification	Date of qualification	Finals appearance	Last appearance	Previous best performance	September 2018 (Note: The CONCACAF rankings of September 2018 were used to determine the four seeded teams of the group stage.)	June 2019	FIFA Rankings June 2019
D1 (seed)	United States (co-hosts)	NAFU	Hex 5th place	7 March 2018	15th	2017	Winners (1991, 2002, 2005, 2007, 2013, 2017)	2	2	30
D2	Panama	UNCAF	Hex 3rd place	7 March 2018	9th	2017	Runners-up (2005, 2013)	5	5	75
D3	Trinidad and Tobago	CFU	Hex 6th place	7 March 2018	10th	2015	Semi-finals (2000)	11	11	92
D4	Guyana	CFU	CNLQ 7th place	23 March 2019	1st	—	Debut	22	22	177

== Standings ==
Pos	Team	Pld	W	D	L	GF	GA	GD	Pts	Qualification
1	United States (H)	3	3	0	0	11	0	+11	9	Advance to knockout stage
2	Panama	3	2	0	1	6	3	+3	6	Advance to knockout stage
3	Guyana	3	0	1	2	3	9	−6	1	
4	Trinidad and Tobago	3	0	1	2	1	9	−8	1	

Source: CONCACAF
Rules for classification: Tiebreakers
(H) Hosts

In the quarter-finals:

- The winners of Group D, the United States, advanced to play the runners-up of Group C, Curaçao.
- The runners-up of Group D, Panama, advanced to play the winners of Group C, Jamaica.

== Matches ==
=== Panama vs Trinidad and Tobago ===
18 June 2019
19:30 (18:30 UTC−5)

Panama	2–0	Trinidad and Tobago
Cooper 53'; Bárcenas 68'	Report

Allianz Field, Saint Paul
Attendance: 19,418
Referee: Adonai Escobedo (Mexico)

Panama	Trinidad and Tobago

GK	1	Luis Mejía
RB	23	Michael Amir Murillo
CB	5	Román Torres (c)
CB	3	Harold Cummings
LB	15	Erick Davis
RM	10	Yoel Bárcenas
CM	4	Fidel Escobar
CM	11	Armando Cooper
LM	19	Alberto Quintero	(substituted off) 89'
CF	17	José Fajardo	(substituted off) 78'
CF	9	Gabriel Torres	(substituted off) 85'
Substitutions:
MF	20	Ernesto Walker	(substituted on) 78'
FW	18	Abdiel Arroyo	(substituted on) 85'
MF	21	Omar Browne	(substituted on) 89'
Manager:
Julio Dely Valdés

GK	1	Marvin Phillip
RB	16	Alvin Jones
CB	5	Daneil Cyrus
CB	2	Aubrey David
LB	17	Mekeil Williams
CM	8	Khaleem Hyland (c)
CM	10	Kevin Molino
CM	19	Kevan George	(substituted off) 66'
RF	13	Nathan Lewis	(substituted off) 83'
CF	11	Levi García
LF	20	Jomal Williams	(substituted off) 65'
Substitutions:
MF	3	Joevin Jones	(substituted on) 65'
MF	23	Leston Paul	(substituted on) 66'
MF	7	Cordell Cato	(substituted on) 83'
Manager:
Dennis Lawrence

Man of the Match:
Yoel Bárcenas (Panama)

Assistant referees:
Alberto Morín (Mexico)
Andrew Barwegen (Canada)
Fourth official:
Fernando Guerrero (Mexico)

=== United States vs Guyana ===
18 June 2019
22:00 (21:00 UTC−5)

United States	4–0	Guyana
Arriola 28'; Boyd 51', 81'; Zardes 55'	Report

Allianz Field, Saint Paul
Attendance: 19,418
Referee: Iván Barton (El Salvador)

United States	Guyana

GK	1	Zack Steffen
RB	2	Nick Lima
CB	23	Aaron Long
CB	13	Walker Zimmerman
LB	5	Tim Ream
DM	4	Michael Bradley (c)	(substituted off) 62'
RM	10	Christian Pulisic	(substituted off) 62'
CM	21	Tyler Boyd
CM	8	Weston McKennie	(substituted off) 74'
LM	7	Paul Arriola
CF	9	Gyasi Zardes
Substitutions:
MF	6	Wil Trapp	(substituted on) 62'
MF	15	Cristian Roldan	(substituted on) 62'
MF	20	Djordje Mihailovic	(substituted on) 74'
Manager:
Gregg Berhalter

GK	1	Akel Clarke
RB	5	Jordan Dover
CB	15	Terence Vancooten
CB	13	Liam Gordon
LB	20	Matthew Briggs
CM	4	Elliot Bonds
CM	7	Keanu Marsh-Brown	(substituted off) 73'
RW	11	Callum Harriott
AM	16	Neil Danns (c)	(substituted off) 85'
LW	21	Brandon Beresford	(substituted off) 58'
CF	10	Emery Welshman
Substitutions:
DF	8	Sam Cox	(substituted on) 58'
MF	23	Anthony Jeffrey	(substituted on) 73'
FW	9	Sheldon Holder	(substituted on) 85'
Manager:
(Jamaica) Michael Johnson

Man of the Match:
Tyler Boyd (United States)

Assistant referees:
Juan Zumba (El Salvador)
David Morán (El Salvador)
Fourth official:
Oshane Nation (Jamaica)

=== Guyana vs Panama ===
22 June 2019
17:30

Guyana	2–4	Panama
Danns 33' (pen.), 90+3' (pen.)	Report	Arroyo 16'; Vancooten 40' (o.g.); Davis 51' (pen.); G. Torres 86'

FirstEnergy Stadium, Cleveland
Attendance: 23,921
Referee: Daneon Parchment (Jamaica)

Guyana	Panama

GK	1	Akel Clarke	(yellow card) 50'
RB	5	Jordan Dover	(yellow card) 44'
CB	20	Matthew Briggs
CB	15	Terence Vancooten
LB	13	Liam Gordon	(yellow card) 48'
CM	16	Neil Danns
CM	4	Elliot Bonds		(substituted off) 55'
CM	8	Sam Cox (c)
RF	17	Terell Ondaan		(substituted off) 66'
CF	10	Emery Welshman	(yellow card) 50'
LF	11	Callum Harriott		(substituted off) 67'
Substitutions:
MF	19	Stephen Duke-McKenna		(substituted on) 55'
MF	23	Anthony Jeffrey		(substituted on) 66'
FW	7	Keanu Marsh-Brown		(substituted on) 67'
Manager:
(Jamaica) Michael Johnson

GK	1	Luis Mejía
RB	23	Michael Amir Murillo
CB	3	Harold Cummings
CB	5	Román Torres (c)
LB	15	Erick Davis
RM	19	Alberto Quintero
CM	4	Fidel Escobar
CM	11	Armando Cooper
LM	10	Yoel Bárcenas		(substituted off) 67'
CF	18	Abdiel Arroyo		(substituted off) 78'
CF	16	Rolando Blackburn		(substituted off) 73'
Substitutions:
MF	7	José Luis Rodríguez		(substituted on) 67'
FW	9	Gabriel Torres		(substituted on) 73'
FW	14	Valentín Pimentel	(yellow card) 90+2'	(substituted on) 78'
Manager:
Julio Dely Valdés

Man of the Match:
Abdiel Arroyo (Panama)

Assistant referees:
Nicholas Anderson (Jamaica)
Kedlee Powell (Cayman Islands)
Fourth official:
Marco Ortíz (Mexico)

=== United States vs Trinidad and Tobago ===
22 June 2019
20:00

United States	6–0	Trinidad and Tobago
Long 41', 90'; Zardes 66', 69'; Pulisic 73'; Arriola 78'	Report

FirstEnergy Stadium, Cleveland
Attendance: 23,921
Referee: Saíd Martínez (Honduras)

United States	Trinidad and Tobago

GK	1	Zack Steffen (c)
RB	2	Nick Lima		(substituted off) 84'
CB	5	Walker Zimmerman
CB	23	Aaron Long
LB	13	Tim Ream
CM	8	Weston McKennie	(yellow card) 58'
CM	4	Michael Bradley
CM	10	Christian Pulisic
RF	21	Tyler Boyd		(substituted off) 61'
CF	9	Gyasi Zardes		(substituted off) 74'
LF	7	Paul Arriola
Substitutions:
FW	11	Jordan Morris		(substituted on) 61'
FW	17	Jozy Altidore		(substituted on) 74'
DF	14	Reggie Cannon		(substituted on) 84'
Manager:
Gregg Berhalter

GK	1	Marvin Phillip
RB	23	Leston Paul
CB	5	Daneil Cyrus	(yellow card) 58'
CB	2	Aubrey David
LB	16	Alvin Jones	(yellow card) 40'
RM	8	Khaleem Hyland (c)		(substituted off) 17'
CM	4	Neveal Hackshaw
CM	11	Levi García		(substituted off) 77'
LM	19	Kevan George
CF	7	Cordell Cato
CF	13	Nathan Lewis		(substituted off) 67'
Substitutions:
MF	10	Kevin Molino		(substituted on) 17'
MF	3	Joevin Jones	(yellow card) 86'	(substituted on) 67'
FW	18	Lester Peltier		(substituted on) 77'
Manager:
Dennis Lawrence

Man of the Match:
Christian Pulisic (United States)

Assistant referees:
Walter López (Honduras)
Helpys Feliz (Dominican Republic)
Fourth official:
Ismael Cornejo (El Salvador)

=== Trinidad and Tobago vs Guyana ===
26 June 2019
18:30 (17:30 UTC-5)

Trinidad and Tobago	1–1	Guyana
Molino 80'	Report	Danns 54'

Children's Mercy Park, Kansas City
Attendance: 17,037
Referee: Juan Gabriel Calderón (Costa Rica)

Trinidad and Tobago	Guyana

GK	22	Adrian Foncette
RB	2	Aubrey David
CB	5	Daneil Cyrus (c)
CB	12	Carlyle Mitchell
LB	17	Mekeil Williams
CM	10	Kevin Molino
CM	19	Kevan George
CM	23	Leston Paul
RF	20	Jomal Williams	(substituted off) 77'
CF	9	Shahdon Winchester	(substituted off) 69'
LF	11	Levi García	(substituted off) 87'
Substitutions:
FW	18	Lester Peltier	(substituted on) 69'
MF	3	Joevin Jones	(substituted on) 77'
MF	7	Cordell Cato	(substituted on) 87'
Manager:
Dennis Lawrence

GK	22	Quillan Roberts
RB	8	Sam Cox (c)
CB	15	Terence Vancooten
CB	6	Ronayne Marsh-Brown
LB	3	Kadell Daniel
DM	23	Anthony Jeffrey		(substituted off) 46'
CM	16	Neil Danns
CM	12	Pernell Schultz		(substituted off) 46'
RW	4	Elliot Bonds
LW	7	Keanu Marsh-Brown
CF	9	Sheldon Holder		(substituted off) 73'
Substitutions:
MF	11	Callum Harriott		(substituted on) 46'
MF	21	Brandon Beresford	(yellow card) 86'	(substituted on) 46'
FW	10	Emery Welshman		(substituted on) 73'
Manager:
Michael Johnson

Man of the Match:
Neil Danns (Guyana)

Assistant referees:
Juan Carlos Mora (Costa Rica)
William Arrieta (Costa Rica)
Fourth official:
Walter López (Guatemala)

=== Panama vs United States ===
26 June 2019
21:00 (20:00 UTC−5)

Panama	0–1	United States
	Report	Altidore 66'

Children's Mercy Park, Kansas City
Attendance: 17,037
Referee: Abdulrahman Al-Jassim (Qatar)

Panama	United States

GK	12	José Calderón
RB	2	Francisco Palacios
CB	13	Adolfo Machado (c)
CB	3	Harold Cummings
LB	6	Kevin Galván	(yellow card) 74'	(substituted off) 76'
RM	7	José Luis Rodríguez
CM	4	Fidel Escobar
CM	8	Marcos Sánchez
LM	21	Omar Browne
CF	17	José Fajardo		(substituted off) 46'
CF	9	Gabriel Torres		(substituted off) 68'
Substitutions:
FW	18	Abdiel Arroyo		(substituted on) 46'
MF	10	Yoel Bárcenas		(substituted on) 68'
DF	23	Michael Amir Murillo		(substituted on) 76'
Manager:
Julio Dely Valdés

GK	12	Sean Johnson
RB	14	Reggie Cannon
CB	19	Matt Miazga
CB	3	Omar Gonzalez (c)
LB	16	Daniel Lovitz
CM	15	Cristian Roldan
CM	6	Wil Trapp
CM	20	Djordje Mihailovic
RF	11	Jordan Morris	(substituted off) 70'
CF	17	Jozy Altidore	(substituted off) 82'
LF	18	Jonathan Lewis	(substituted off) 65'
Substitutions:
MF	10	Christian Pulisic	(substituted on) 65'
FW	21	Tyler Boyd	(substituted on) 70'
FW	9	Gyasi Zardes	(substituted on) 82'
Manager:
Gregg Berhalter

Man of the Match:
Jozy Altidore (United States)

Assistant referees:
Taleb Al Marri (Qatar)
Saoud Al Maqaleh (Qatar)
Fourth official:
Reon Radix (Grenada)

== Discipline ==
Fair play points would have been used as tiebreakers if the overall and head-to-head records of teams were tied. These were calculated based on yellow and red cards received in all group matches as follows:

- first yellow card: minus 1 point;
- indirect red card (second yellow card): minus 3 points;
- direct red card: minus 4 points;
- yellow card and direct red card: minus 5 points;

Only one of the above deductions were applied to a player in a single match.

Team	Match 1				Match 2				Match 3				Points
Team	Booked	(yellow card) (yellow-red card)	Sent off (straight red)	(yellow card) (red card)	Booked	(yellow card) (yellow-red card)	Sent off (straight red)	(yellow card) (red card)	Booked	(yellow card) (yellow-red card)	Sent off (straight red)	(yellow card) (red card)	Points
United States					1								–1
Panama					1				1				–2
Trinidad and Tobago					3								–3
Guyana					4				1				–5
