= Loïc Chauvet =

Martiniquais footballer (born 1988)

Personal information
- Full name: Loïc Ludovic Chauvet
- Date of birth: April 30, 1988 (age 38)
- Place of birth: Fort-de-France, Martinique
- Height: 1.81 m (5 ft 11 in)
- Position: Goalkeeper

Team information
- Current team: CS Case-Pilote

Senior career*
Years	Team	Apps	(Gls)
2010–2011	CS Case-Pilote		
2011–2013	Golden Star		
2013–2015	Club Franciscain		
2015–	CS Case-Pilote		

International career
2011–	Martinique		
- * Club domestic league appearances and goals

Loïc Chauvet (born 30 April 1988) is a Martiniquais professional footballer who plays as a goalkeeper for Club Colonial and the Martinique national team.

He made his debut for Martinique in 2008. He was in the Martinique Gold Cup squads for the 2013 and 2017 tournaments.
