= Aníbal Álvarez =

Cuban footballer

Personal information
- Full name: Aníbal Álvarez La Pera
- Date of birth: 25 May 1995 (age 31)
- Place of birth: Ciego de Ávila, Cuba
- Position: Midfielder

Team information
- Current team: Ciego de Ávila

Senior career*
Years	Team	Apps	(Gls)
2016–	Ciego de Ávila		

International career^{‡}
2019–	Cuba	4	(1)
- * Club domestic league appearances and goals ‡ National team caps and goals as of 23 June 2019

Aníbal Álvarez La Pera, known as Aníbal Álvarez (born 25 May 1995) is a Cuban professional footballer who plays as a midfielder for Campeonato Nacional club Ciego de Ávila.

== International career ==
He made his Cuba national football team debut on 27 February 2019 in a friendly against Bermuda, and scored the fourth goal in a 5–0 victory.

He was later selected for the 2019 CONCACAF Gold Cup squad.
