= Alejandro Portal =

Cuban footballer (born 1995)

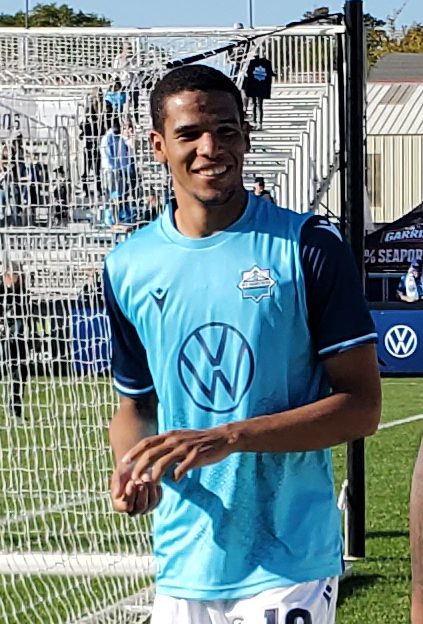
- Portal with HFX Wanderers in 2021

Personal information
- Full name: Alejandro Miguel Portal Oliva
- Date of birth: 21 October 1995 (age 31)
- Place of birth: Quivicán, Cuba
- Height: 1.76 m (5 ft 9 in)
- Position: Midfielder

Team information
- Current team: International FC

Senior career*
Years	Team	Apps	(Gls)
2013–2015	Mayabeque		
2016–2017	Isla de La Juventud	27	(4)
2017–2018	Cienfuegos	19	(0)
2018	Pinar del Río		
2019	La Habana		
2021	Vaughan Azzurri	1	(0)
2021	HFX Wanderers	10	(0)
2022	Vaughan Azzurri	16	(1)
2023–2024	Simcoe County Rovers	39	(0)
2025	Vaughan Azzurri	14	(0)
2026–	International FC	0	(0)

International career^{‡}
2015	Cuba U20	2	(0)
2015–2019	Cuba	7	(0)
- * Club domestic league appearances and goals as of 19 August 2025 ‡ National team caps and goals as of 9 September 2021

Alejandro Miguel Portal Oliva (born 21 October 1995) is a Cuban professional footballer who plays as a midfielder for the International FC in League1 Ontario.

== Early life ==
Portal was born in the town of Quivicán, located south of Havana.

== Club career ==
Portal began his career with second-division Torneo de Ascenso side Mayabeque in 2013. In 2015, he moved up to the Campeonato Nacional with Isla de La Juventud, making 27 appearances and scoring four goals over two seasons. In 2017, he joined Cienfuegos, making nineteen appearances over two seasons. He spent 2018 and 2019 with Pinar del Río and La Habana, respectively.

In 2020, he began training with the League1 Ontario side Vaughan Azzurri and made his debut as a substitute against Darby on 20 August 2021.

On 9 September 2021, Portal signed his first professional contract with Canadian Premier League side HFX Wanderers. He made his debut on 18 September against York United FC. He departed the club at the end of the season.

In 2022, he returned to playing for Vaughan Azzurri.

In February 2023, he signed with the Simcoe County Rovers in League1 Ontario.

In 2025, he played with Vaughan Azzurri.

== International career ==
Portal made his debut for the Cuba national team in a 2015 friendly against Nicaragua. He returned to the team four years later for a friendly against Bermuda in 2019. He was later selected for the 2019 CONCACAF Gold Cup squad, where he appeared in all three matches for Cuba.

After Cuba's 6–0 loss to Canada during CONCACAF Nations League qualifying in September, he defected into Canada along with Andy Baquero.
