= Fernando Navarro (Mexican footballer) =

Mexican footballer (born 1989)

Personal information
- Full name: Fernando Navarro Morán
- Date of birth: 18 April 1989 (age 37)
- Place of birth: Mexico City, Mexico
- Height: 1.65 m (5 ft 5 in)
- Position: Right-back

Youth career
- 2007: Tecamachalco

Senior career*
Years	Team	Apps	(Gls)
2008–2011	Atlante	86	(2)
2008	Potros Chetumal	7	(1)
2011–2013	Tigres UANL	12	(0)
2013	Pachuca	2	(0)
2013–2021	León	226	(17)
2022	Pachuca	18	(0)
2022–2023	Toluca	46	(2)
2024	Puebla	14	(1)
2024	Atlante	15	(0)

International career
2019	Mexico	3	(1)
Medal record
Men's football
Representing Mexico
CONCACAF Gold Cup
Winner	2019 United States	Team
- * Club domestic league appearances and goals

Fernando Navarro Morán (born 18 April 1989) is a Mexican former professional footballer who played as a right-back.

== International career ==
Navarro was named in Mexico's provisional squad for the 2015 CONCACAF Gold Cup but was cut from the final roster. He made his senior national team debut on 5 June 2019, in a friendly match against Venezuela, as a starter in a 3–1 victory.

== Career statistics ==
=== International ===
As of match played 7 September 2019

National team	Year	Apps	Goals
Mexico	2019	3	1
Total		3	1

=== International goals ===
Scores and results list Mexico's goal tally first.

No.	Date	Venue	Opponent	Score	Result	Competition
1.	23 June 2019	Bank of America Stadium, Charlotte, United States	Martinique	3–1	3–2	2019 CONCACAF Gold Cup

== Honours ==
Atlante

- CONCACAF Champions League: 2008–09

Tigres UANL

- Mexican Primera División: Apertura 2011

León

- Liga MX: Apertura 2013, Clausura 2014, Guardianes 2020

Mexico

- CONCACAF Gold Cup: 2019

Individual

- Liga MX Best XI: Guardianes 2020
- Liga MX Best Full-back: 2020–21
- Liga MX All-Star: 2021
