= Willian Pozo-Venta =

Cuban footballer (born 1997)

Personal information
- Full name: Willian Pozo-Venta Angell
- Date of birth: 27 August 1997 (age 29)
- Place of birth: Havana, Cuba
- Height: 1.84 m (6 ft 0 in)
- Positions: Winger; forward

Team information
- Current team: Hønefoss
- Number: 11

Youth career
- Sofiemyr
- –2013: Follo
- 2013–2014: Metz
- 2014–2015: Tromsø
- 2016: Follo

Senior career*
Years	Team	Apps	(Gls)
2015	Tromsø 3	5	(0)
2015	Tromsø 2	2	(0)
2016–2017	Follo 2	16	(11)
2016–2017	Follo	18	(1)
2018	Zimbru Chișinău	18	(2)
2019	Stomil Olsztyn II	5	(1)
2020–2021	Strømmen	9	(0)
2021–2022	Notodden	28	(7)
2023	KTP	17	(3)
2024–2026	Grorud	38	(11)
2026–	Hønefoss	5	(1)

International career^{‡}
2014	Norway U17	3	(0)
2014–2015	Norway U18	6	(0)
2021–	Cuba	22	(4)
- * Club domestic league appearances and goals as of 15 November 2026 ‡ National team caps and goals as of 27 August 2024

Willian Pozo-Venta Angell (born 27 August 1997) is a Cuban professional footballer who plays as a winger or attacker for Hønefoss. A former youth international for Norway, he represents the Cuba national team.

== Club career ==
In 2015, Pozo-Venta trialed for Stoke City in the English Premier League after playing for the youth academy of French Ligue 1 side Metz. Before the 2018 season, he signed for Zimbru Chișinău in Moldova from Norwegian Second Division club Follo. Before the 2020 season, he signed for Strømmen in the Norwegian First Division from the reserves of Polish second division team Stomil Olsztyn. On 27 August 2021, he moved to Notodden in the Norwegian Second Division.

On 13 January 2023, Pozo-Venta signed a one-year contract with KTP in Finland.

== International career ==
Born in Cuba, Pozo-Venta moved to Norway at the age of 4. He was a youth international for Norway. He made his debut with the Cuba national team in a 5–0 2022 FIFA World Cup qualification win over British Virgin Islands on 2 June 2021.

List of international goals scored by Willian Pozo
Number	Date	Venue	Opponent	Score	Result	Competition
1	11 November 2021	Nicaragua National Football Stadium, Managua, Nicaragua	Nicaragua	3–0	3–0	Friendly
2	5 June 2022	Estadio Antonio Maceo, Santiago de Cuba, Cuba	Barbados	1–0	3–0	2022–23 CONCACAF Nations League B
3	12 September 2023	Estadio Antonio Maceo, Santiago de Cuba, Cuba	Suriname	1–0	1–0	2023–24 CONCACAF Nations League A
