= Kévin Fortuné =

Footballer (born 1989)

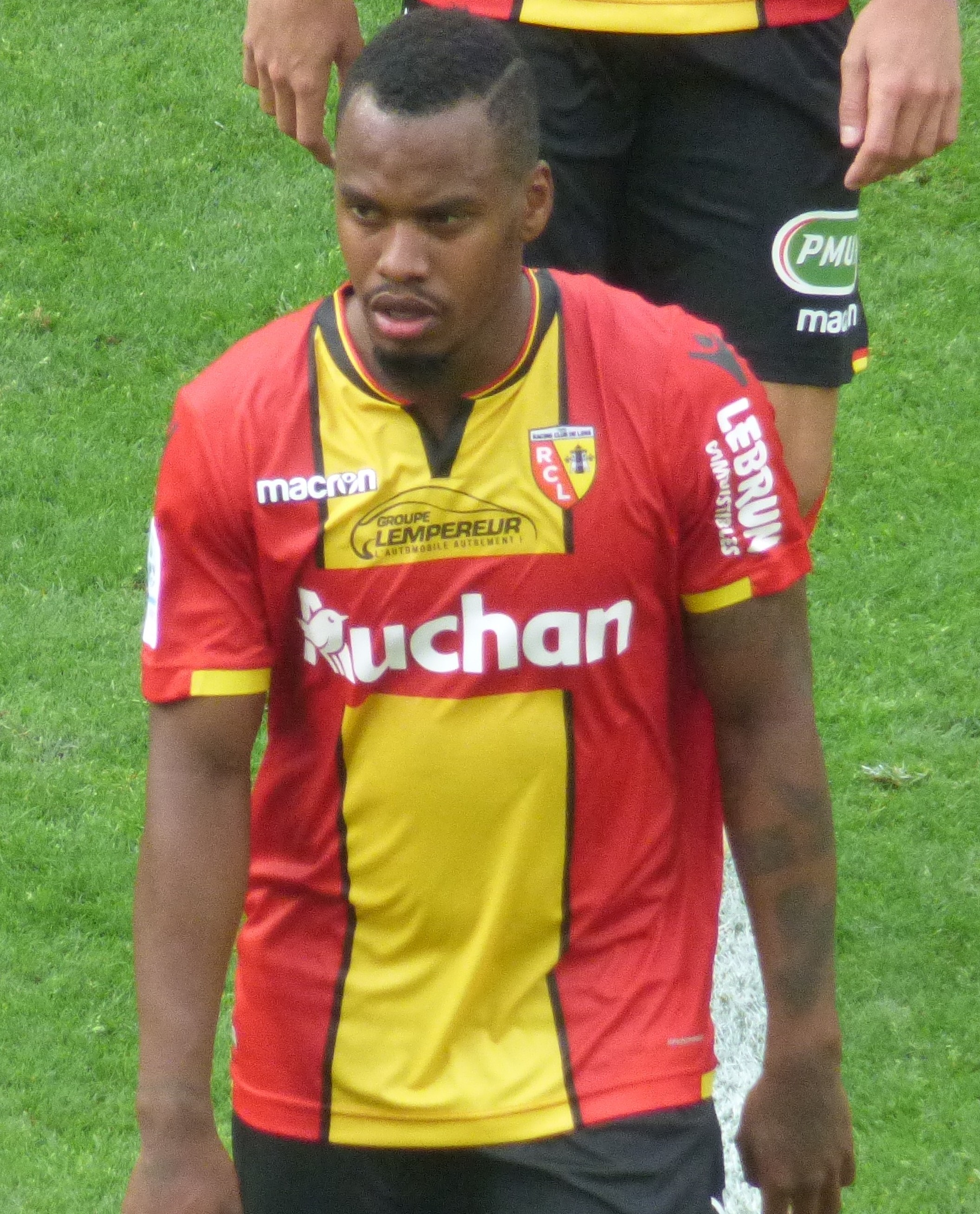
- Fortuné with Lens in 2018

Personal information
- Date of birth: 6 August 1989 (age 37)
- Place of birth: Paris, France
- Height: 1.82 m (6 ft 0 in)
- Position: Forward

Team information
- Current team: Arras FA

Senior career*
Years	Team	Apps	(Gls)
2011–2013	Luzenac	25	(1)
2013	Albi	16	(7)
2013–2014	Martigues	25	(4)
2014–2016	AS Béziers	62	(27)
2016–2018	Lens	76	(18)
2018–2019	Troyes	36	(11)
2019–2020	Tractor	10	(1)
2020–2021	Auxerre	25	(3)
2021–2022	Châteauroux	23	(2)
2022–2024	Orléans	51	(17)
2024–2025	Villefranche	12	(1)
2025–	Arras FA	0	(0)

International career^{‡}
2018–	Martinique	12	(3)
- * Club domestic league appearances and goals as of 6 December 2024 ‡ National team caps and goals as of 26 June 2023

Kévin Fortuné (born 6 August 1989) is a professional footballer who plays as a forward for Arras FA. Born in metropolitan France, he plays for the Martinique national team.

== Early life ==
Fortuné was born in the 17th arrondissement of Paris, France but his family originated from the department of Martinique, making him eligible to play for their national team.

== Club career ==
=== Troyes ===
On 31 August 2018, the last day of the 2018 summer transfer window, Fortuné joined Ligue 1 side Troyes AC from Ligue 2 club RC Lens signing a three-year contract.

=== Tractor ===
On 22 August 2019, Fortuné joined Tractor S.C. after an undisclosed fee was agreed between Troyes AC and the Iranian club.

Media reports indicate that there was a high transfer fee involved and considering Fortuné's annual income the deal was unprecedented in Iranian football and Fortuné becomes one of the highest earning players in the Persian Gulf Pro League.

=== Auxerre ===
In May 2020, after being released by Tractor, Fortuné agreed a two-year contract with AJ Auxerre.

=== Orléans ===
On 22 June 2022, Fortuné moved to Orléans.

=== Villefranche ===
On 31 July 2024, Fortuné signed with Villefranche.

== International career ==
He made his debut for the Martinique football team in a 1–0 2019–20 CONCACAF Nations League qualifying win over Puerto Rico on 13 October 2018. On 7 June 2019, he was named to Martinique's squad for the 2019 CONCACAF Gold Cup.

On 18 July 2021, Fortuné scored the 1,000th CONCACAF Gold Cup goal against Haiti in a 2–1 loss in the 2021 CONCACAF Gold Cup competition.

== Career statistics ==
=== International goals ===
Scores and results list Martinique's goal tally first, score column indicates score after each Fortuné goal.

List of international goals scored by Kévin Fortuné
No.	Date	Venue	Opponent	Score	Result	Competition
1	19 June 2019	Broncos Stadium at Mile High, Denver, United States	Cuba	3–0	3–0	2019 CONCACAF Gold Cup
2	18 July 2021	Toyota Stadium, Frisco, United States	Haiti	1–1	1–2	2021 CONCACAF Gold Cup
3	26 June 2023	DRV PNK Stadium, Fort Lauderdale, United States	El Salvador	2–0	2–1	2023 CONCACAF Gold Cup
