= Johnny Marajo =

Martiniquais footballer (born 1993)

Personal information
- Full name: Johnny Daniel Marajo
- Date of birth: October 12, 1993 (age 33)
- Place of birth: Schœlcher, Martinique
- Height: 1.79 m (5 ft 10 in)
- Position: Forward

Team information
- Current team: Club Franciscain

Senior career*
Years	Team	Apps	(Gls)
2012–2014	AS Etoile de Basse-Porte		
2014–2015	AC Arles-Avignon		
2015–	Club Franciscain		

International career^{‡}
2015–	Martinique	35	(2)
- * Club domestic league appearances and goals ‡ National team caps and goals as of 16 June 2026

Johnny Marajo (born 12 October 1993) is a professional footballer who plays as a forward for Club Franciscain in the Martinique Championnat National and internationally for Martinique.

He made his debut for Martinique in 2015. He was in the Martinique Gold Cup squad for the 2017 tournament.

== International career ==
=== International goals ===
Scores and results list Martinique's goal tally first.

No.	Date	Venue	Opponent	Score	Result	Competition
1.	23 June 2021	Stade Pierre-Aliker, Fort-de-France, Martinique	Guadeloupe	1–2	1–2	Friendly
2.	13 October 2023	Stade Pierre-Aliker, Fort-de-France, Martinique	El Salvador	1–0	1–0	2023–24 CONCACAF Nations League A
