= Raúl Mederos =

Cuban football coach (born 1967)

Personal information
- Full name: Idalberto Raúl Mederos Sosa
- Date of birth: 8 August 1967 (age 59)
- Place of birth: Cuba

Managerial career
- Years: Team
- 2016–2017: Villa Clara
- 2016–2017: Cuba
- 2018–2019: Cuba

Idalberto Raúl Mederos Sosa (born 8 August 1967) is a Cuban football coach, who most recently managed Cuba.

== Managerial career ==
Mederos managed Cuban club Villa Clara, winning the 2016 Campeonato Nacional de Fútbol de Cuba.

In 2016, Mederos became manager of Cuba.
