= Luis Paradela =

Cuban footballer (born 1997)

Personal information
- Full name: Luis Javier Paradela Díaz
- Date of birth: 21 January 1997 (age 29)
- Place of birth: Calimete, Cuba
- Height: 1.70 m (5 ft 7 in)
- Positions: Winger; attacking midfielder

Team information
- Current team: Deportivo Saprissa
- Number: 23

Youth career
- –2015: Matanzas

Senior career*
Years	Team	Apps	(Gls)
2015–2018	Matanzas		
2019	USAC	12	(6)
2019	→ Reno 1868 (loan)	5	(0)
2020	Jocoro	6	(1)
2020–2021	Chalatenango	14	(1)
2021–2022	Santos de Guápiles	46	(12)
2022–	Deportivo Saprissa	99	(29)
2024–2025	→ Universitatea Craiova (loan)	19	(3)

International career^{‡}
2018–	Cuba	41	(11)
- * Club domestic league appearances and goals as of 25 July 2026 ‡ National team caps and goals as of 18 November 2024

Luis Javier Paradela Díaz (born 21 January 1997) is a Cuban professional footballer who plays as a winger or an attacking midfielder for Liga FPD club Saprissa and the Cuba national team.

== Club career ==
=== Youth career ===
Paradela began his youth career in his native Cuba with club FC Matanzas.

=== USAC ===
He joined USAC in 2019, making his competitive debut for USAC in a 2–1 home defeat against Sansare FC on 20 January 2019, during the Clausura tournament of the 2018–2019 season. He scored his first goal and brace in a 4–1 home victory over Achuapa on 26 January 2019, followed by another brace four days later in a 2–2 away tie against Aurora.

=== Reno 1868 ===
In August 2019, Paradela joined USL Championship side Reno 1868 on loan. Paradela became the first Cuban soccer player to play in the United States without defecting. Due to the unique unprecedented process, the P1 VISA took months to be processed and was obtained with only single entry and for 90 days validity. The player was cleared to arrive in Reno only with 6 games remaining in the season.

=== Jocoro ===
In late January 2020, after being denied return to the USL Championship due to pressure from the Football Association of Cuba, and missing out on several offers in different countries due immigration bottlenecks, Paradela joined Jocoro F.C. in the La Liga Mayor, playing six matches before the cancellation of the Clausura 2020 due to the COVID-19 pandemic.

=== Chalatenango ===
In August 2020, after not being able to join Santos de Guápiles F.C. in Costa Rica due to the COVID-19 pandemic travel restrictions, Luis Paradela confirmed his commitment to play the Apertura 2020 with C.D. Chalatenango. The offer by Santos de Guápiles F.C. remained valid for the Clausura 2021.

=== Santos de Guápiles ===
In early January 2021, Paradela transferred to Santos de Guápiles in the Liga FPD debuting shortly after in a match against C.S. Cartaginés.

In 2022, Paradela was awarded the best foreign player of the 2021–22 season award for his excellent performance in the Apertura 2021. His participation in the Clausura 2022 was limited to 7 games only due to an immigration issue affecting several foreign players in Costa Rica, which also prevented him from participating in the Concacaf Champions League 2022 series against New York City FC.

=== Saprissa ===
Paradela was signed by Saprissa on a transfer from Santos in the summer of 2022 along with his offensive partner Javon East. He quickly established himself as a fans’ favorite, scoring 4 goals in his first 6 matches at the club.

== International career ==
On 27 August 2018, Parabela made his official senior international debut for Cuba in a friendly against Barbados. He scored a hat-trick against Turks and Caicos Islands on 8 September 2018 in an 11–0 victory, helping Cuba to their biggest ever win.

Paradela was included in the best eleven of 2019–20 CONCACAF Nations League qualifying and was among the top scorers with five goals.

== Career statistics ==
As of match played 18 November 2024

Appearances and goals by national team and year
National team	Year	Apps	Goals
Cuba	2018	5	4
Cuba	2019	9	1
Cuba	2020	0	0
Cuba	2021	6	1
Cuba	2022	8	2
Cuba	2023	10	1
Cuba	2024	3	2
Total		41	11

Scores and results list Cuba's goal tally first, score column indicates score after each Paradela goal.

List of international goals scored by Luis Paradela
No.	Date	Venue	Opponent	Score	Result	Competition
1	8 September 2018	Estadio Pedro Marrero, Havana, Cuba	Turks and Caicos Islands	1–0	11–0	2019–20 CONCACAF Nations League qualification
2	8 September 2018	Estadio Pedro Marrero, Havana, Cuba	Turks and Caicos Islands	4–0	11–0	2019–20 CONCACAF Nations League qualification
3	8 September 2018	Estadio Pedro Marrero, Havana, Cuba	Turks and Caicos Islands	6–0	11–0	2019–20 CONCACAF Nations League qualification
4	12 October 2018	Kirani James Athletic Stadium, St. George's, Grenada	Grenada	1–0	2–0	2019–20 CONCACAF Nations League qualification
5	24 March 2019	Stade Sylvio Cator, Port-au-Prince, Haiti	Haiti	1–1	1–2	2019–20 CONCACAF Nations League qualification
6	2 June 2021	Estadio Doroteo Guamuch Flores, Guatemala City, Guatemala	British Virgin Islands	1–0	5–0	2022 FIFA World Cup qualification
7	5 June 2022	Estadio Antonio Maceo, Santiago de Cuba, Cuba	Barbados	3–0	3–0	2022–23 CONCACAF Nations League B
8	9 June 2022	Warner Park, Basseterre, Saint Kitts and Nevis	Antigua and Barbuda	1–0	2–0	2022–23 CONCACAF Nations League B
9	4 July 2023	Shell Energy Stadium, Houston, United States	Canada	1–2	2–4	2023 CONCACAF Gold Cup
10	15 November 2024	SKNFA Technical Center, Saint Peter Basseterre, Saint Kitts	Saint Kitts and Nevis	1–1	1–2	2025 CONCACAF Gold Cup qualification play-in
11	18 November 2024	Estadio Antonio Maceo, Santiago de Cuba, Cuba	Saint Kitts and Nevis	3–0	4–0	2025 CONCACAF Gold Cup qualification play-in
12	26 March 2026	Estadio Cibao, Santiago, Dominican Republic	Martinique	1–0	2–2	2025–26 CONCACAF Series

== Honours ==
Saprissa

- Liga FPD: 2022 Apertura, 2022 Clausura, 2023 Apertura, 2024 Clausura
- Costa Rican Cup runner-up: 2023
- Supercopa de Costa Rica: 2023
- Recopa de Costa Rica: 2023

Universitatea Craiova

- Liga I: 2025–26
- Cupa României: 2025–26
