= Stéphane Abaul =

Martiniquais footballer (born 1991)

Personal information
- Full name: Stéphane Ludovic Abaul
- Date of birth: 23 November 1991 (age 34)
- Place of birth: Le Lamentin, Martinique
- Height: 1.78 m (5 ft 10 in)
- Position: Midfielder

Team information
- Current team: Club Franciscain

Senior career*
| Years | Team | Apps | (Gls) |
| 2009– | Club Franciscain | | |

International career^{‡}
| 2010– | Martinique | 61 | (9) |
- * Club domestic league appearances and goals as of 5 December 2019 ‡ National team caps and goals as of 16 June 2026

Stéphane Abaul (born 23 November 1991) is a professional footballer who plays as a midfielder for Club Franciscain in the Martinique Championnat National and internationally for Martinique.

He made his debut for Martinique in 2010. He was in the Martinique Gold Cup squads for the 2013 and 2017 tournaments.

== Career statistics ==
Scores and results list Martinique's goal tally first, score column indicates score after each Abaul goal.

List of international goals scored by Stéphane Abaul
| No. | Date | Venue | Opponent | Score | Result | Competition |
|---|---|---|---|---|---|---|
| 1 | 5 September 2012 | Stade Omnisports, Le Lamentin, Martinique | British Virgin Islands | 6–0 | 16–0 | 2012 Caribbean Cup qualification |
| 2 | 5 September 2012 | Stade Omnisports, Le Lamentin, Martinique | British Virgin Islands | 7–0 | 16–0 | 2012 Caribbean Cup qualification |
| 3 | 26 September 2012 | Parc des Sports, Paris, France | Mayotte | 3–0 | 3–0 | 2012 Coupe de l'Outre-Mer |
| 4 | 26 December 2015 | Stade Omnisports, La Lamentin, Martinique | Guadeloupe | 2–0 | 2–0 | Friendly |
| 5 | 13 March 2013 | Victoria Park, Kingstown, Saint Vincent and the Grenadines | Saint Vincent and the Grenadines | 1–0 | 4–0 | Friendly |
| 6 | 29 March 2016 | Windsor Park, Roseau, Dominica | Dominica | 4–1 | 4–1 | 2017 Caribbean Cup qualification |
| 7 | 27 March 2017 | Usain Bolt Sports Complex, Cave Hill, Barbados | Barbados | 1–2 | 1–2 | Friendly |
| 8 | 19 November 2018 | Stade Pierre-Aliker, Fort-de-France, Martinique | Antigua and Barbuda | 1–0 | 4–2 | 2019–20 CONCACAF Nations League qualification |
| 9 | 19 June 2019 | Broncos Stadium at Mile High, Denver, United States | Cuba | 2–0 | 3–0 | 2019 CONCACAF Gold Cup |
