= Kévin Parsemain =

Martiniquais footballer (born 1988)

Personal information
- Full name: Kévin Marius Parsemain
- Date of birth: 13 February 1988 (age 38)
- Place of birth: Le François, Martinique, France
- Height: 1.78 m (5 ft 10 in)
- Position: Striker

Team information
- Current team: Golden Lion
- Number: 17

Senior career*
| Years | Team | Apps | (Gls) |
| 2004–2006 | Club Franciscain | | |
| 2006–2009 | Le Mans B | 37 | (3) |
| 2009 | Evian | 1 | (0) |
| 2009–2014 | Rivière-Pilote | 32 | (26) |
| 2014–2015 | Seattle Sounders FC | 0 | (0) |
| 2015 | Seattle Sounders FC 2 | 5 | (0) |
| 2015–2016 | DC Motema Pembe | 17 | (10) |
| 2016–2019 | Golden Lion | 74 | (82) |
| 2019–2020 | Ayutthaya United | 14 | (5) |
| 2021– | Golden Lion | 76 | (66) |

International career
| 2008–2022 | Martinique | 57 | (35) |
- * Club domestic league appearances and goals

Kévin Parsemain (born 13 February 1988) is a Martiniquais footballer who plays for Golden Lion and the Martinique team, of which he is the all-time leading scorer. Besides Martinique, he has played in France, the United States, DR Congo, and Thailand.

== Club career ==
Parsemain began his career at Club Franciscain in Martinique. For the 2006–07 season, he moved to France and signed for Le Mans' 'B' team after being scouted with Franciscan. He spent two and half seasons at the club. In the winter transfer window of the 2008–09 season, he signed for the reserve team of Evian Thonon Gaillard, then known as Olympique Croix de Savoie. He made one appearance for the senior squad, playing the final 20 minutes in a 2–1 away win over Cherbourg. Parsemain's time and appearances with Olympique Croix de Savoie were cut short by a recurring groin injury. At this time, he returned to Martinique and signed with RC Rivière-Pilote in 2009.

In January 2014, it was reported by Caribbean media that Parsemain had signed with Seattle Sounders FC of Major League Soccer. It was later confirmed that Parsemain was in fact on trial with the club. During his preseason trial, he scored two goals in his first 105 minutes of action against MLS opponents, including a "stunning volley" from the top of the penalty box. At that point in preseason, he was tied with Nigerian international Obafemi Martins as the team's leading scorer, making one of the strongest statements among unsigned players hopeful of earning a contract. Parsemain was officially signed by the Sounders on 28 March 2014. However, only weeks after signing, he suffered a torn ACL and was expected to miss six to seven months and was not expected to appear during the 2014 Major League Soccer season. Seattle waived Parsemain in March 2015.

In August 2015, Parsemain joined five other French professional at Daring Club Motema Pembe of the Congolese Linafoot for the 2015–16 season. He left in April 2016, stating in an interview that "You do not get paid on time, our security was not guaranteed.".

In July 2016 he returned to Martinique, signing for Golden Lion. In September 2017 an expected transfer to Sporting Kansas City was ruled out on a technicality.

== International career ==
Parsemain made his international debut for the Martinique team in 2008.

== Career statistics ==
Scores and results list Martinique's goal tally first, score column indicates score after each Parsemain goal.

List of international goals scored by Kévin Parsemain
| No. | Date | Venue | Opponent | Score | Result | Competition |
|---|---|---|---|---|---|---|
| 1 | 30 May 2010 | Progress Park, Saint Andrew's, Grenada | Grenada | 1–0 | 2–2 | Friendly |
| 2 | 28 August 2010 | George Odlum Stadium, Vieux Fort, Saint Lucia | Saint Lucia | 1–0 | 1–1 | Friendly |
| 3 | 23 September 2010 | Parc des Sports des Maisons Rouges, Bry-sur-Marne, France | Tahiti | 3–1 | 4–1 | 2010 Coupe de l'Outre-Mer |
| 4 | 26 September 2010 | Stade Henri-Longuet, Viry-Châtillon, France | New Caledonia | 3–0 | 4–0 | 2010 Coupe de l'Outre-Mer |
| 5 | 3 March 2012 | Stade Georges-Gratiant, Le Lamentin, Martinique | Guadeloupe | 1–1 | 1–2 | Friendly |
| 6 | 2 May 2012 | Stade Georges-Gratiant, Le Lamentin, Martinique | Guyana | 1–0 | 2–2 | Friendly |
| 7 | 5 September 2012 | Stade Georges-Gratiant, Le Lamentin, Martinique | British Virgin Islands | 3–0 | 16–0 | 2012 Caribbean Cup qualification |
| 8 | 5 September 2012 | Stade Georges-Gratiant, Le Lamentin, Martinique | British Virgin Islands | 8–0 | 16–0 | 2012 Caribbean Cup qualification |
| 9 | 5 September 2012 | Stade Georges-Gratiant, Le Lamentin, Martinique | British Virgin Islands | 9–0 | 16–0 | 2012 Caribbean Cup qualification |
| 10 | 5 September 2012 | Stade Georges-Gratiant, Le Lamentin, Martinique | British Virgin Islands | 11–0 | 16–0 | 2012 Caribbean Cup qualification |
| 11 | 5 September 2012 | Stade Georges-Gratiant, Le Lamentin, Martinique | British Virgin Islands | 13–0 | 16–0 | 2012 Caribbean Cup qualification |
| 12 | 5 September 2012 | Stade Georges-Gratiant, Le Lamentin, Martinique | British Virgin Islands | 15–0 | 16–0 | 2012 Caribbean Cup qualification |
| 13 | 7 September 2012 | Stade En Camée, Rivière-Pilote, Martinique | Montserrat | 1–0 | 5–0 | 2012 Caribbean Cup qualification |
| 14 | 7 September 2012 | Stade En Camée, Rivière-Pilote, Martinique | Montserrat | 3–0 | 5–0 | 2012 Caribbean Cup qualification |
| 15 | 7 September 2012 | Stade En Camée, Rivière-Pilote, Martinique | Montserrat | 4–0 | 5–0 | 2012 Caribbean Cup qualification |
| 16 | 7 September 2012 | Stade En Camée, Rivière-Pilote, Martinique | Montserrat | 5–0 | 5–0 | 2012 Caribbean Cup qualification |
| 17 | 9 September 2012 | Stade Pierre-Aliker, Fort-de-France, Martinique | Suriname | 1–0 | 2–2 | 2012 Caribbean Cup qualification |
| 18 | 22 September 2012 | Stade Jean-Bouin, Issy-les-Moulineaux, France | New Caledonia | 1–0 | 2–0 | 2012 Coupe de l'Outre-Mer |
| 19 | 22 September 2012 | Stade Jean-Bouin, Issy-les-Moulineaux, France | New Caledonia | 2–0 | 2–0 | 2012 Coupe de l'Outre-Mer |
| 20 | 26 September 2012 | Parc des Sports, Saint-Ouen-l'Aumône, France | Mayotte | 1–0 | 3–0 | 2012 Coupe de l'Outre-Mer |
| 21 | 12 December 2012 | Sir Vivian Richards Stadium, North Sound, Antigua and Barbuda | French Guiana | 2–0 | 3–1 | 2012 Caribbean Cup |
| 22 | 14 December 2012 | Antigua Recreation Ground, Saint John's, Antigua and Barbuda | Trinidad and Tobago | 1–0 | 1–1 | 2012 Caribbean Cup |
| 23 | 14 July 2013 | Sports Authority Field, Denver, United States of America | Mexico | 1–2 | 1–3 | 2013 CONCACAF Gold Cup |
| 24 | 23 March 2016 | Stade Pierre-Aliker, Fort-de-France, Martinique | British Virgin Islands | 1–0 | 3–0 | 2017 Caribbean Cup qualification |
| 25 | 11 October 2016 | Stade Pierre-Aliker, Fort-de-France, Martinique | Trinidad and Tobago | 1–0 | 2–0 | 2017 Caribbean Cup qualification |
| 26 | 26 April 2017 | Stade Georges-Gratiant, Le Lamentin, Martinique | Guadeloupe | 1–0 | 4–1 | Friendly |
| 27 | 26 April 2017 | Stade Georges-Gratiant, Le Lamentin, Martinique | Guadeloupe | 3–0 | 4–1 | Friendly |
| 28 | 8 July 2017 | Nissan Stadium, Nashville, United States of America | Nicaragua | 1–0 | 2–0 | 2017 CONCACAF Gold Cup |
| 29 | 12 July 2017 | Raymond James Stadium, Tampa, United States of America | United States | 1–2 | 2–3 | 2017 CONCACAF Gold Cup |
| 30 | 12 July 2017 | Raymond James Stadium, Tampa, United States of America | United States | 2–2 | 2–3 | 2017 CONCACAF Gold Cup |
| 31 | 14 October 2018 | Juan Ramón Loubriel Stadium, Bayamón, Puerto Rico | Puerto Rico | 1–0 | 1–0 | 2019–20 CONCACAF Nations League qualification |
| 32 | 16 October 2018 | Stade Pierre-Aliker, Fort-de-France, Martinique | British Virgin Islands | 1–0 | 4–0 | 2019–20 CONCACAF Nations League qualification |
| 33 | 16 October 2018 | Stade Pierre-Aliker, Fort-de-France, Martinique | British Virgin Islands | 3–0 | 4–0 | 2019–20 CONCACAF Nations League qualification |
| 34 | 19 November 2018 | Stade Pierre-Aliker, Fort-de-France, Martinique | Antigua and Barbuda | 4–1 | 4–2 | 2019–20 CONCACAF Nations League qualification |
| 35 | 23 June 2019 | Bank of America Stadium, Charlotte, United States of America | Mexico | 1–1 | 2–3 | 2019 CONCACAF Gold Cup |

== Honours ==
Individual

- Martinique Championnat National top scorer: 2010–11 (with 20 goals), 2021–22 (with 22 goals)

== See also ==
- List of top international men's football goalscorers by country
