= Yosel Piedra =

Cuban footballer

Personal information
- Full name: Yosel Piedra Guillén
- Date of birth: 27 March 1994 (age 32)
- Place of birth: Cuba
- Height: 1.85 m (6 ft 1 in)
- Position: Defender

Team information
- Current team: Asociación Deportiva San Carlos
- Number: 5

Youth career
- –2011: Villa Clara

Senior career*
Years	Team	Apps	(Gls)
2012–	Villa Clara		
2019–2021	USAC	4	(0)
2022–	San Carlos		(0)

International career^{‡}
2011	Cuba U17	2	(0)
2013	Cuba U20	9	(0)
2015	Cuba U23	3	(0)
2015–	Cuba	25	(0)
- * Club domestic league appearances and goals as of 10:51, 28 March 2017 (UTC) ‡ National team caps and goals as of 19:51, 12 April 2018 (UTC)

Yosel Piedra Guillén (born 27 March 1994), also known as Josel Piedra, is a Cuban professional footballer who plays as a defender for Liga FPD club San Carlos and the Cuba national team.

== International career ==
Piedra represented Cuba at the 2011 CONCACAF U-17 Championship, playing two games as Cuba were knocked out. His next taste of international football was with the under 20 squad at the 2013 FIFA U-20 World Cup in Turkey, where he made three appearances as Cuba was once again knocked out in the group stage. He featured in Cuba's unsuccessful qualification for the 2016 Summer Olympics, playing in all three games. He made his debut for the senior side in December 2015, in a 5–0 friendly thrashing by Nicaragua.

== Career statistics ==
=== International ===
As of matches played 11 April 2017.

National team	Year	Apps	Goals
Cuba	2015	3	0
Cuba	2016	4	0
Cuba	2017	0	0
Cuba	2018	2	0
Total		9	0
