= 2019 CONCACAF Gold Cup =

15th edition of the CONCACAF Gold Cup

Copa de Oro de la Concacaf 2019 (in Spanish)

Tournament details
- Host countries: Costa Rica; Jamaica; United States
- Dates: June 15 – July 7
- Teams: 16
- Venues: 17 (in 16 host cities)

Final positions
- Champions: Mexico (8th title)
- Runners-up: United States

Tournament statistics
- Matches played: 31
- Goals scored: 96 (3.1 per match)
- Attendance: 1,043,168 (33,651 per match)
- Top scorer: (Canada) Jonathan David (6 goals)
- Best player: (Mexico) Raúl Jiménez
- Best young player: (United States) Christian Pulisic
- Best goalkeeper: (Mexico) Guillermo Ochoa
- Fair play award: United States

The 2019 CONCACAF Gold Cup was the 15th edition of the CONCACAF Gold Cup, the biennial international men's soccer championship of the North, Central American, and Caribbean region organized by CONCACAF. The tournament was primarily hosted in the United States, with Costa Rica and Jamaica hosting double-headers in the first round of matches in groups B and C, respectively.

The United States were the defending champions, having won the 2017 tournament. With the abolition of the FIFA Confederations Cup, the CONCACAF Cup was annulled and the Gold Cup did not qualify the winner to a major tournament for the first time since 2009.

In February 2018, CONCACAF announced that the tournament would expand to 16 teams from 12.

Mexico won their record-extending eighth Gold Cup title (their eleventh CONCACAF championship overall) with their 1–0 victory over the United States in the final.

== Venues ==
In May 2018, CONCACAF confirmed that matches would be held in Central America and the Caribbean in addition to the United States. This was the first time that the Gold Cup was held in the Caribbean, with all previous matches having taken place in the United States, Mexico, or Canada.

=== United States ===
In May 2018, CONCACAF announced the fifteen venues in the United States which would host matches. Soldier Field in Chicago was announced on September 27, 2018, as the venue of the final.

Pasadena (Los Angeles Area)	Denver	Houston	
Rose Bowl	Broncos Stadium at Mile High	NRG Stadium	BBVA Stadium
Capacity: 90,888	Capacity: 76,125	Capacity: 71,795	Capacity: 22,039
Charlotte	Location of the host cities of the 2019 CONCACAF Gold Cup in the United States.		
Bank of America Stadium	Location of the host cities of the 2019 CONCACAF Gold Cup in the United States.		
Capacity: 75,525	Location of the host cities of the 2019 CONCACAF Gold Cup in the United States.		
Philadelphia	Location of the host cities of the 2019 CONCACAF Gold Cup in the United States.		
Lincoln Financial Field	Location of the host cities of the 2019 CONCACAF Gold Cup in the United States.		
Capacity: 69,176	Location of the host cities of the 2019 CONCACAF Gold Cup in the United States.		
Nashville	Location of the host cities of the 2019 CONCACAF Gold Cup in the United States.		
Nissan Stadium	Location of the host cities of the 2019 CONCACAF Gold Cup in the United States.		
Capacity: 69,143	Location of the host cities of the 2019 CONCACAF Gold Cup in the United States.		
Cleveland	Glendale (Phoenix Area)	Chicago	Harrison (New York City Area)
FirstEnergy Stadium	State Farm Stadium	Soldier Field	Red Bull Arena
Capacity: 67,895	Capacity: 63,400	Capacity: 61,500	Capacity: 25,000
Los Angeles	Frisco (Dallas Area)	Saint Paul (Minneapolis Area)	Kansas City (Kansas City Area)
Banc of California Stadium	Toyota Stadium	Allianz Field	Children's Mercy Park
Capacity: 22,000	Capacity: 20,500	Capacity: 19,400	Capacity: 18,467

=== Costa Rica ===
On November 26, 2018, CONCACAF announced that Costa Rica would host a double-header in the first round of matches of Group B on June 16, 2019, taking place at the Estadio Nacional in San José.

Location of the host city of the 2019 CONCACAF Gold Cup in Costa Rica.	San José
Location of the host city of the 2019 CONCACAF Gold Cup in Costa Rica.	Estadio Nacional
Location of the host city of the 2019 CONCACAF Gold Cup in Costa Rica.	Capacity: 35,175

=== Jamaica ===
On April 2, 2019, CONCACAF announced that Jamaica would host a double-header in the first round of matches of Group C on June 17, 2019, taking place at the Independence Park in Kingston.

Location of the host city of the 2019 CONCACAF Gold Cup in Jamaica.	Kingston
Location of the host city of the 2019 CONCACAF Gold Cup in Jamaica.	Independence Park
Location of the host city of the 2019 CONCACAF Gold Cup in Jamaica.	Capacity: 35,000

== Teams ==
=== Qualification ===
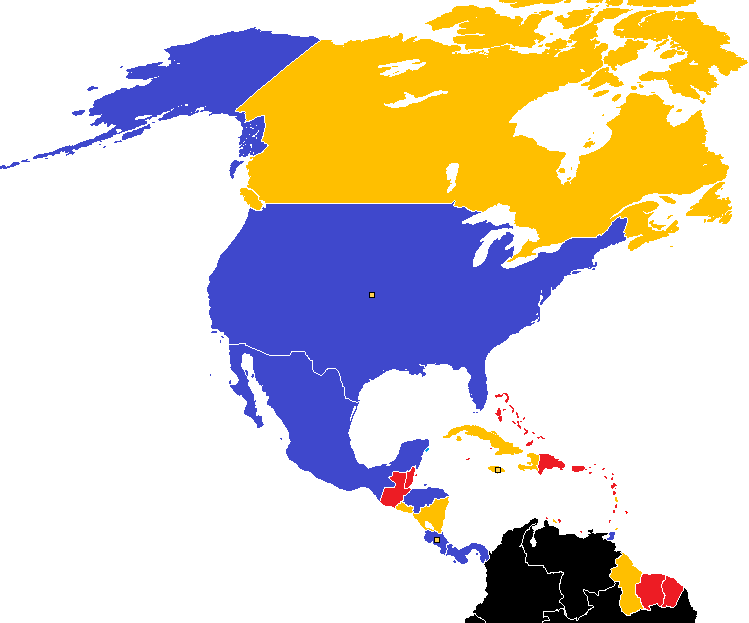
Team qualified as WCQ Hexagonal Country qualified as CNLQ Team failed to qualify

The qualification system was changed and no longer divided into Central American and Caribbean zones. Among the 16 teams, six qualified directly after participating in the 2018 FIFA World Cup qualifying Hexagonal, while the other 10 teams qualified through the 2019–20 CONCACAF Nations League qualifying.

Bermuda and Guyana made their Gold Cup debuts.

Team	Qualification (Note: Hex indicates 2018 FIFA World Cup qualifying Hexagonal, CNLQ indicates 2019–20 CONCACAF Nations League qualifying.)	Date of qualification	Gold Cup appearances (+ CONCACAF Championship)	Last appearance	Previous best Gold Cup performance (Note: Bold indicates that the corresponding team was hosting the event.) (+ CONCACAF Championship)	FIFA Ranking at start of event	CONCACAF Ranking at start of event
Mexico	Hex 1st place	7 March 2018 (Note: Confirmed as Gold Cup participants on March 7, 2018, but qualified for the Hexagonal on March 29, 2016.)	15th (23rd)	2017	Champions (**1993**, 1996, 1998, **2003**, 2009, 2011, 2015); Champions (1965, 1971, **1977**)	18	1
Costa Rica (co-hosts)	Hex 2nd place	7 March 2018 (Note: Confirmed as Gold Cup participants on March 7, 2018, but qualified for the Hexagonal on September 2, 2016.)	14th (20th)	2017	Runners-up (2002); Champions (1963, **1969**, 1989)	39	3
Panama	Hex 3rd place	7 March 2018	9th (10th)	2017	Runners-up (2005, 2013)	75	5
Honduras	Hex 4th place	7 March 2018 (Note: Confirmed as Gold Cup participants on March 7, 2018, but qualified for the Hexagonal on September 6, 2016.)	14th (20th)	2017	Runners-up (1991); Champions (**1981**)	61	4
United States (title holders & co-hosts)	Hex 5th place	7 March 2018	15th (17th)	2017	Champions (**1991**, **2002**, **2005**, **2007**, **2013**, **2017**); Runners-up (1989)	30	2
Trinidad and Tobago	Hex 6th place	7 March 2018	10th (16th)	2015	Semi-finals (2000); Runners-up (1973)	92	11
Haiti	CNLQ 1st place	24 March 2019	7th (14th)	2015	Quarter-finals (2002, 2009); Champions (1973)	101	10
Canada	CNLQ 2nd place	24 March 2019	14th (17th)	2017	Champions (2000); Champions (1985)	78	6
Martinique	CNLQ 3rd place	23 March 2019	6th (6th)	2017	Quarter-finals (2002)	N/A (Note: Martinique are not a FIFA member, and so do not have a FIFA Ranking.)	12
Curaçao	CNLQ 4th place	23 March 2019	2nd (6th)	2017	Group stage (2017); Third place (1963, 1969)	79	15
Bermuda	CNLQ 5th place	24 March 2019	1st (1st)	None	Debut	174	20
Cuba	CNLQ 6th place	24 March 2019	9th (11th)	2015	Quarter-finals (2003, 2013, 2015); Fourth place (1971)	175	13
Guyana	CNLQ 7th place	23 March 2019	1st (1st)	None	Debut	177	22
Jamaica (co-hosts)	CNLQ 8th place	23 March 2019	11th (13th)	2017	Runners-up (2015, 2017)	54	7
Nicaragua	CNLQ 9th place	24 March 2019	3rd (5th)	2017	Group stage (2009, 2017); Sixth place (1967)	129	14
El Salvador	CNLQ 10th place	24 March 2019	11th (17th)	2017	Quarter-finals (2002, 2003, 2011, 2013, 2017); Runners-up (1963, 1981)	69	9

=== Squads ===
Each team had to submit a list of 23 players (three players had to be goalkeepers).

=== Seeding ===
On August 31, 2018, CONCACAF announced that the top four teams of the September 2018 CONCACAF Ranking Index were seeded for the group stage of the tournament:

Rank	Seeded team	Pts
1	Mexico	2,042
2	United States	1,872
3	Costa Rica	1,798
4	Honduras	1,632

The groups and full match schedule were revealed on April 10, 2019, 18:00 EDT (15:00 local time, PDT), in Los Angeles, California, United States.

== Match officials ==
Match officials were announced on May 15, 2019.

Referees

- (Costa Rica) Juan Gabriel Calderón
- (Costa Rica) Henry Bejarano
- (Cuba) Yadel Martínez
- (Guatemala) Mario Escobar
- (Guatemala) Walter López
- (Honduras) Saíd Martínez
- (Jamaica) Daneon Parchment
- (Mexico) Adonai Escobedo
- (Mexico) Fernando Guerrero
- (Mexico) Marco Ortíz
- (Panama) John Pitti
- (Qatar) Abdulrahman Al-Jassim
- (El Salvador) Iván Barton
- (United States) Jair Marrufo
- (United States) Armando Villarreal
- (United States) Ismail Elfath

Assistant Referees

- (Canada) Micheal Barwegen
- (Cayman Islands) Kedlee Powell
- (Costa Rica) Juan Carlos Mora
- (Costa Rica) William Arrieta
- (Dominican Republic) Helpys Feliz
- (Guatemala) Gerson López
- (Guatemala) Humberto Panjoj
- (Honduras) Christian Ramírez
- (Honduras) Walter López
- (Jamaica) Nicholas Anderson
- (Mexico) Alberto Morín
- (Mexico) Miguel Hernández
- (Nicaragua) Henri Pupiro
- (Qatar) Taleb Al Marri
- (Qatar) Saoud Al Maqaleh
- (El Salvador) Juan Zumba
- (El Salvador) David Morán
- (Suriname) Zachari Zeegelaar
- (Trinidad and Tobago) Caleb Wales
- (United States) Frank Anderson
- (United States) Ian Anderson
- (United States) Corey Parker
- (United States) Kyle Atkins

Targeted advanced referee program (TARP)

- (Costa Rica) Keylor Herrera
- (Dominican Republic) Randy Encarnación
- (El Salvador) Ismael Cornejo
- (Grenada) Reon Radix
- (Jamaica) Oshane Nation
- (Mexico) Diego Montaño
- (Panama) Oliver Vergara
- (Panama) José Kellys
- (Puerto Rico) José Torres

== Group stage ==
The match dates and the assignments were announced by CONCACAF on October 9, 2018. The quarter-final pairings were later amended on October 12, 2018. The top two teams from each group qualified for the quarter-finals.

All match times listed are EDT (UTC−4), as listed by CONCACAF. If the venue is located in a different time zone, the local time is also given.

Tie-breaking criteria for group play
The ranking of teams in the group stage was determined as follows:
1. Points obtained in all group matches;
2. Goal difference in all group matches;
3. Number of goals scored in all group matches;
4. Points obtained in the matches played between the teams in question;
5. Goal difference in the matches played between the teams in question;
6. Number of goals scored in the matches played between the teams in question;
7. Fair play points in all group matches (only one deduction could be applied to a player in a single match):
  - Yellow card: −1 points;
  - Indirect red card (second yellow card): −3 points;
  - Direct red card: −4 points;
  - Yellow card and direct red card: −5 points;
8. Drawing of lots.

=== Group A ===
Pos	Team	Pld	W	D	L	GF	GA	GD	Pts	Qualification
1	Mexico	3	3	0	0	13	3	+10	9	Advance to knockout stage
2	Canada	3	2	0	1	12	3	+9	6	Advance to knockout stage
3	Martinique	3	1	0	2	5	7	−2	3	
4	Cuba	3	0	0	3	0	17	−17	0	

Source: CONCACAF
15 June 2019
19:30 (16:30 UTC−7)

Canada	4–0	Martinique
David 33', 53'; Hoilett 63'; Arfield 67'	Report

Rose Bowl, Pasadena
Attendance: 65,527
Referee: Saíd Martínez (Honduras)
15 June 2019
22:00 (19:00 UTC−7)

Mexico	7–0	Cuba
Antuna 2', 44', 80'; Jiménez 31', 64'; Reyes 38'; Vega 74'	Report

Rose Bowl, Pasadena
Attendance: 65,527
Referee: John Pitti (Panama)

19 June 2019
20:00 (18:00 UTC−6)

Cuba	0–3	Martinique
	Report	Marveaux 45'; Abaul 70'; Fortuné 84'

Broncos Stadium at Mile High, Denver
Attendance: 52,874
Referee: Abdulrahman Al-Jassim (Qatar)
19 June 2019
22:30 (20:30 UTC−6)

Mexico	3–1	Canada
Alvarado 40'; Guardado 54', 77'	Report	Cavallini 75'

Broncos Stadium at Mile High, Denver
Attendance: 52,874
Referee: Henry Bejarano (Costa Rica)

23 June 2019
18:00

Canada	7–0	Cuba
David 3', 71', 77'; Cavallini 21', 43', 45+1'; Hoilett 50'	Report

Bank of America Stadium, Charlotte
Attendance: 59,283
Referee: Armando Villarreal (United States)
23 June 2019
20:30

Martinique	2–3	Mexico
Parsemain 56'; Delem 84'	Report	Antuna 29'; Jiménez 61'; Navarro 72'

Bank of America Stadium, Charlotte
Attendance: 59,283
Referee: Iván Barton (El Salvador)

=== Group B ===
Pos	Team	Pld	W	D	L	GF	GA	GD	Pts	Qualification
1	Haiti	3	3	0	0	6	2	+4	9	Advance to knockout stage
2	Costa Rica (H)	3	2	0	1	7	3	+4	6	Advance to knockout stage
3	Bermuda	3	1	0	2	4	4	0	3	
4	Nicaragua	3	0	0	3	0	8	−8	0	

Source: CONCACAF
(H) Hosts
16 June 2019
18:00 (16:00 UTC−6)

Haiti	2–1	Bermuda
Pierrot 54', 66'	Report	Leverock 45+2'

Estadio Nacional, San José
Attendance: 19,140
Referee: Daneon Parchment (Jamaica)
16 June 2019
20:30 (18:30 UTC−6)

Costa Rica	4–0	Nicaragua
Oviedo 7'; Borges 19'; Aguilar 45+1'; Cruz 75'	Report

Estadio Nacional, San José
Attendance: 19,140
Referee: Marco Ortíz (Mexico)

20 June 2019
19:00 (18:00 UTC−5)

Nicaragua	0–2	Haiti
	Report	Saba 22'; Rosas 33' (o.g.)

Toyota Stadium, Frisco
Attendance: 7,000
Referee: Mario Escobar (Guatemala)
20 June 2019
21:30 (20:30 UTC−5)

Costa Rica	2–1	Bermuda
George 30'; Aguilar 54'	Report	Wells 59' (pen.)

Toyota Stadium, Frisco
Attendance: 7,000
Referee: Yadel Martínez (Cuba)

24 June 2019
18:30

Bermuda	2–0	Nicaragua
Simmons 60'; Wells 71'	Report

Red Bull Arena, Harrison
Attendance: 20,044
Referee: Adonai Escobedo (Mexico)
24 June 2019
21:00

Haiti	2–1	Costa Rica
Nazon 57' (pen.); Alexis 81'	Report	Saborío 13'

Red Bull Arena, Harrison
Attendance: 20,044
Referee: Ismail Elfath (United States)

=== Group C ===
Pos	Team	Pld	W	D	L	GF	GA	GD	Pts	Qualification
1	Jamaica (H)	3	1	2	0	4	3	+1	5	Advance to knockout stage
2	Curaçao	3	1	1	1	2	2	0	4	Advance to knockout stage
3	El Salvador	3	1	1	1	1	4	−3	4	
4	Honduras	3	1	0	2	6	4	+2	3	

Source: CONCACAF
(H) Hosts
17 June 2019
19:00 (18:00 UTC−5)

Curaçao	0–1	El Salvador
	Report	Bonilla 45+2'

Independence Park, Kingston
Attendance: 17,874
Referee: Walter López (Guatemala)
17 June 2019
21:30 (20:30 UTC−5)

Jamaica	3–2	Honduras
Orgill 15', 41'; Lowe 56'	Report	Lozano 54'; Castillo 90+2'

Independence Park, Kingston
Attendance: 17,874
Referee: Jair Marrufo (United States)

21 June 2019
19:00 (18:00 UTC−5)

El Salvador	0–0	Jamaica
	Report

BBVA Stadium, Houston
Attendance: 22,395
Referee: John Pitti (Panama)
21 June 2019
21:30 (20:30 UTC−5)

Honduras	0–1	Curaçao
	Report	Bacuna 40'

BBVA Stadium, Houston
Attendance: 22,395
Referee: Juan Gabriel Calderón (Costa Rica)

25 June 2019
20:00 (17:00 UTC−7)

Jamaica	1–1	Curaçao
Nicholson 14'	Report	Gaari 90+3'

Banc of California Stadium, Los Angeles
Attendance: 22,503
Referee: Marco Ortíz (Mexico)
25 June 2019
22:30 (19:30 UTC−7)

Honduras	4–0	El Salvador
Álvarez 59'; Castillo 65'; Acosta 75'; Izaguirre 90'	Report

Banc of California Stadium, Los Angeles
Attendance: 22,503
Referee: Fernando Guerrero (Mexico)

=== Group D ===
Pos	Team	Pld	W	D	L	GF	GA	GD	Pts	Qualification
1	United States (H)	3	3	0	0	11	0	+11	9	Advance to knockout stage
2	Panama	3	2	0	1	6	3	+3	6	Advance to knockout stage
3	Guyana	3	0	1	2	3	9	−6	1	
4	Trinidad and Tobago	3	0	1	2	1	9	−8	1	

Source: CONCACAF
(H) Hosts
18 June 2019
19:30 (18:30 UTC−5)

Panama	2–0	Trinidad and Tobago
Cooper 53'; Bárcenas 68'	Report

Allianz Field, Saint Paul
Attendance: 19,418
Referee: Adonai Escobedo (Mexico)
18 June 2019
22:00 (21:00 UTC−5)

United States	4–0	Guyana
Arriola 28'; Boyd 51', 81'; Zardes 55'	Report

Allianz Field, Saint Paul
Attendance: 19,418
Referee: Iván Barton (El Salvador)

22 June 2019
17:30

Guyana	2–4	Panama
Danns 33' (pen.), 90+3' (pen.)	Report	Arroyo 16'; Vancooten 40' (o.g.); Davis 51' (pen.); G. Torres 86'

FirstEnergy Stadium, Cleveland
Attendance: 23,921
Referee: Daneon Parchment (Jamaica)
22 June 2019
20:00

United States	6–0	Trinidad and Tobago
Long 41', 90'; Zardes 66', 69'; Pulisic 73'; Arriola 78'	Report

FirstEnergy Stadium, Cleveland
Attendance: 23,921
Referee: Saíd Martínez (Honduras)

26 June 2019
18:30 (17:30 UTC-5)

Trinidad and Tobago	1–1	Guyana
Molino 80'	Report	Danns 54'

Children's Mercy Park, Kansas City
Attendance: 17,037
Referee: Juan Gabriel Calderón (Costa Rica)
26 June 2019
21:00 (20:00 UTC−5)

Panama	0–1	United States
	Report	Altidore 66'

Children's Mercy Park, Kansas City
Attendance: 17,037
Referee: Abdulrahman Al-Jassim (Qatar)

== Knockout stage ==
In the knockout stage, if a match was tied after 90 minutes, extra time was played, where a fourth substitute was allowed for each team. If still tied after extra time, the match was decided by a penalty shoot-out.

=== Bracket ===
Quarter-finals
29 June – Houston (NRG)
Haiti	3
Canada	2
29 June – Houston (NRG)
Mexico (p)	1 (5)
Costa Rica	1 (4)
30 June – Philadelphia
Jamaica	1
Panama	0
30 June – Philadelphia
United States	1
Curaçao	0

Semi-finals
2 July – Glendale
Haiti	0
Mexico (a.e.t.)	1
3 July – Nashville
Jamaica	1
United States	3

Final
7 July – Chicago
Mexico	1
United States	0

=== Quarter-finals ===
29 June 2019
19:00 (18:00 UTC−5)

Haiti	3–2	Canada
Nazon 50'; Bazile 70' (pen.); Guerrier 76'	Report	David 18'; Cavallini 28'

NRG Stadium, Houston
Attendance: 70,788
Referee: Jair Marrufo (United States)

29 June 2019
22:00 (21:00 UTC−5)

Mexico	1–1 (a.e.t.)	Costa Rica
Jiménez 44'	Report	Ruiz 52' (pen.)
Penalties
Jiménez (penalty missed); Montes (penalty scored); Alvarado (penalty scored); Gallardo (penalty scored); Moreno (penalty scored); Salcedo (penalty scored)	5–4	(penalty scored) Borges; (penalty scored) Aguilar; (penalty missed) Leal; (penalty scored) Duarte; (penalty scored) Calvo; (penalty missed) Fuller

NRG Stadium, Houston
Attendance: 70,788
Referee: John Pitti (Panama)

30 June 2019
17:30

Jamaica	1–0	Panama
Mattocks 75' (pen.)	Report

Lincoln Financial Field, Philadelphia
Attendance: 26,233
Referee: Mario Escobar (Guatemala)

30 June 2019
20:00

United States	1–0	Curaçao
McKennie 25'	Report

Lincoln Financial Field, Philadelphia
Attendance: 26,233
Referee: Adonai Escobedo (Mexico)

=== Semi-finals ===
2 July 2019
22:30 (19:30 UTC−7)

Haiti	0–1 (a.e.t.)	Mexico
	Report	Jiménez 93' (pen.)

State Farm Stadium, Glendale
Attendance: 64,128
Referee: Abdulrahman Al-Jassim (Qatar)

3 July 2019
21:30 (20:30 UTC−5)

Jamaica	1–3	United States
Nicholson 69'	Report	McKennie 9'; Pulisic 52', 87'

Nissan Stadium, Nashville
Attendance: 28,473
Referee: Iván Barton (El Salvador)

=== Final ===
July 7, 2019
21:15 (20:15 UTC−5)

Mexico	1–0	United States
Dos Santos 73'	Report

Soldier Field, Chicago
Attendance: 62,493
Referee: Mario Escobar (Guatemala)

== Statistics ==
=== Goalscorers ===
There were 96 goals scored in 31 matches, for an average of 3.1 goals per match.

6 goals

- (Canada) Jonathan David

5 goals

- (Canada) Lucas Cavallini
- (Mexico) Raúl Jiménez

4 goals

- (Mexico) Uriel Antuna

3 goals

- (Guyana) Neil Danns
- (United States) Christian Pulisic
- (United States) Gyasi Zardes

2 goals

- (Bermuda) Nahki Wells
- (Canada) Junior Hoilett
- (Costa Rica) Elías Aguilar
- (Haiti) Duckens Nazon
- (Haiti) Frantzdy Pierrot
- (Honduras) Rubilio Castillo
- (Jamaica) Shamar Nicholson
- (Jamaica) Dever Orgill
- (Mexico) Andrés Guardado
- (United States) Paul Arriola
- (United States) Tyler Boyd
- (United States) Aaron Long
- (United States) Weston McKennie

1 goal

- (Bermuda) Dante Leverock
- (Bermuda) Lejuan Simmons
- (Canada) Scott Arfield
- (Costa Rica) Celso Borges
- (Costa Rica) Allan Cruz
- (Costa Rica) Mayron George
- (Costa Rica) Bryan Oviedo
- (Costa Rica) Bryan Ruiz
- (Costa Rica) Álvaro Saborío
- (Curaçao) Leandro Bacuna
- (Curaçao) Juriën Gaari
- (El Salvador) Nelson Bonilla
- (Haiti) Djimy Alexis
- (Haiti) Hervé Bazile
- (Haiti) Wilde-Donald Guerrier
- (Haiti) Steeven Saba
- (Honduras) Bryan Acosta
- (Honduras) Jorge Álvarez
- (Honduras) Emilio Izaguirre
- (Honduras) Anthony Lozano
- (Jamaica) Damion Lowe
- (Jamaica) Darren Mattocks
- (Martinique) Stéphane Abaul
- (Martinique) Jordy Delem
- (Martinique) Kévin Fortuné
- (Martinique) Joris Marveaux
- (Martinique) Kévin Parsemain
- (Mexico) Roberto Alvarado
- (Mexico) Jonathan dos Santos
- (Mexico) Fernando Navarro
- (Mexico) Diego Reyes
- (Mexico) Alexis Vega
- (Panama) Abdiel Arroyo
- (Panama) Yoel Bárcenas
- (Panama) Armando Cooper
- (Panama) Erick Davis
- (Panama) Gabriel Torres
- (Trinidad and Tobago) Kevin Molino
- (United States) Jozy Altidore

1 own goal

- (Guyana) Terence Vancooten (against Panama)
- (Nicaragua) Manuel Rosas (against Haiti)

=== Awards ===
The following Gold Cup awards were given at the conclusion of the tournament: the Golden Boot (top scorer), Golden Ball (best overall player) and Golden Glove (best goalkeeper).

Golden Ball
(Mexico) Raúl Jiménez
Golden Boot
(Canada) Jonathan David
6 goals, 2 assists
306 minutes played
Golden Glove
(Mexico) Guillermo Ochoa
Young Player Award
(United States) Christian Pulisic
Fair Play Trophy
United States

Best XI

The technical study group selected the tournament's best XI.

Goalkeeper	Defenders	Midfielders	Forward
(Mexico) Guillermo Ochoa	(Mexico) Luis Rodríguez (Mexico) Carlos Salcedo (United States) Aaron Long (Mexico) Jesús Gallardo	(United States) Michael Bradley (Mexico) Andrés Guardado (Mexico) Jonathan dos Santos (Canada) Jonathan David (United States) Christian Pulisic	(Mexico) Raúl Jiménez

== Marketing ==
=== Broadcasting rights ===
CONCACAF

Country	Broadcaster	Ref
United States (co-host)	FOX Sports (English)	
United States (co-host)	Univision (Spanish)	
Costa Rica (co-host)	Repretel	
Costa Rica (co-host)	Teletica	
Jamaica (co-host)	TVJ	
Canada	TSN (English)	
Canada	RDS (French)	
Central America: Costa Rica (co-host); Dominican Republic; El Salvador; Guatemala; Honduras; Nicaragua; Panama	Televisa; Sky Sports	
Mexico	Televisa; Sky Sports	
Mexico	ESPN	
Mexico	Imagen Televisión	
Mexico	TV Azteca	
El Salvador	TCS	
Guatemala	Canal 3, Televisiete, Teleonce, Trecevisión	
Honduras	Televicentro	
Panama	TVMax	
Panama	TVN	

International

	Broadcaster	Ref
International (selected unsold markets)	Concacaf GO	
Austria	DAZN	
Brazil	DAZN	
Germany	DAZN	
Spain	DAZN	
Switzerland	DAZN	
Balkans: Bosnia and Herzegovina; Croatia; Slovenia; Montenegro; North Macedonia; Serbia	Sport Klub	
Ireland	FreeSports	
United Kingdom	FreeSports	
Israel	Charlton	
Netherlands	Fox Sports	
Norway	TV2	
Portugal	Sport TV	
Russia	Match TV	
Singapore	StarHub	
Slovakia	Arena Sport	
Sweden	CMore Sport	
Tajikistan	TV Varzish	
Turkey	D-Smart	

=== Sponsorship ===
- Allstate
- Camarena Tequila
- Chick-fil-A
- Gatorade
- Cerveza Modelo de México
- Nike, Inc.
- Scotiabank
- Sprint Corporation
- Toyota
- Valvoline
