= 2019 CONCACAF Gold Cup Group B =

Football tournament group stage

Group B of the 2019 CONCACAF Gold Cup took place from 16 to 24 June 2019. The group consisted of Bermuda, co-hosts Costa Rica, Haiti, and Nicaragua. The top two teams, Haiti and Costa Rica, advanced to the knockout stage.

== Teams ==
| Draw position | Team | Zone | Method of qualification | Date of qualification | Finals appearance | Last appearance | Previous best performance | CONCACAF Rankings | | FIFA Rankings June 2019 |
| Draw position | Team | Zone | Method of qualification | Date of qualification | Finals appearance | Last appearance | Previous best performance | September 2018 (Note: The CONCACAF rankings of September 2018 were used to determine the four seeded teams of the group stage.) | June 2019 | FIFA Rankings June 2019 |
|---|---|---|---|---|---|---|---|---|---|---|
| B1 (seed) | Costa Rica (co-hosts) | UNCAF | Hex 2nd place | 7 March 2018 | 14th | 2017 | Runners-up (2002) | 3 | 3 | 39 |
| B2 | Haiti | CFU | CNLQ 1st place | 24 March 2019 | 7th | 2015 | Quarter-finals (2002, 2009) | 10 | 10 | 101 |
| B3 | Nicaragua | UNCAF | CNLQ 9th place | 24 March 2019 | 3rd | 2017 | Group stage (2009, 2017) | 17 | 14 | 129 |
| B4 | Bermuda | CFU | CNLQ 5th place | 24 March 2019 | 1st | — | Debut | 23 | 20 | 174 |

== Standings ==
| Pos | Team | Pld | W | D | L | GF | GA | GD | Pts | Qualification |
|---|---|---|---|---|---|---|---|---|---|---|
| 1 | Haiti | 3 | 3 | 0 | 0 | 6 | 2 | +4 | 9 | Advance to knockout stage |
| 2 | Costa Rica (H) | 3 | 2 | 0 | 1 | 7 | 3 | +4 | 6 | Advance to knockout stage |
| 3 | Bermuda | 3 | 1 | 0 | 2 | 4 | 4 | 0 | 3 | |
| 4 | Nicaragua | 3 | 0 | 0 | 3 | 0 | 8 | −8 | 0 | |

Source: CONCACAF
Rules for classification: Tiebreakers
(H) Hosts

In the quarter-finals:

- The winners of Group B, Haiti, advanced to play the runners-up of Group A, Canada.
- The runners-up of Group B, Costa Rica, advanced to play the winners of Group A, Mexico.

== Matches ==
=== Haiti vs Bermuda ===
16 June 2019
18:00 (16:00 UTC−6)

| Haiti | 2–1 | Bermuda |
|---|---|---|
| Pierrot 54', 66' | Report | Leverock 45+2' |

Estadio Nacional, San José
Attendance: 19,140
Referee: Daneon Parchment (Jamaica)

| Haiti | Bermuda |

| GK | 1 | Johny Placide (c) |
| RB | 2 | Carlens Arcus |
| CB | 4 | Ricardo Adé |
| CB | 3 | Mechack Jérôme | | (substituted off) 11' |
| LB | 10 | Wilde-Donald Guerrier | (yellow card) 75' |
| CM | 21 | Bryan Alceus |
| CM | 8 | Zachary Herivaux |
| CM | 19 | Steeven Saba |
| RF | 9 | Duckens Nazon | | (substituted off) 87' |
| CF | 20 | Frantzdy Pierrot |
| LF | 14 | Charles Hérold Jr. | | (substituted off) 46' |
Substitutions:
| DF | 6 | Jems Geffrard | | (substituted on) 11' |
| FW | 11 | Derrick Etienne Jr. | | (substituted on) 46' |
| FW | 18 | Jonel Désiré | | (substituted on) 87' |
Manager:
(Martinique) Marc Collat

| GK | 1 | Dale Eve |
| RB | 19 | Reggie Lambe | | (substituted off) 62' |
| CB | 6 | Jaylon Bather |
| CB | 16 | Dante Leverock (c) |
| LB | 3 | Calon Minors |
| DM | 7 | Lejuan Simmons | | (substituted off) 58' |
| CM | 8 | Donte Brangman |
| CM | 11 | Willie Clemons |
| RW | 13 | Osagi Bascome | | (substituted off) 77' |
| LW | 10 | Zeiko Lewis |
| CF | 21 | Nahki Wells |
Substitutions:
| DF | 17 | Justin Donawa | (yellow card) 13' | (substituted on) 58' |
| MF | 15 | Milan Butterfield | | (substituted on) 62' |
| FW | 9 | Jonte Smith | | (substituted on) 77' |
Manager:
Kyle Lightbourne

Man of the Match:
Frantzdy Pierrot (Haiti)

Assistant referees:
Kedlee Powell (Cayman Islands)
Zachari Zeegelaar (Suriname)
Fourth official:
Ismael Cornejo (El Salvador)

=== Costa Rica vs Nicaragua ===
16 June 2019
20:30 (18:30 UTC−6)

| Costa Rica | 4–0 | Nicaragua |
|---|---|---|
| Oviedo 7'; Borges 19'; Aguilar 45+1'; Cruz 75' | Report |

Estadio Nacional, San José
Attendance: 19,140
Referee: Marco Ortíz (Mexico)

| Costa Rica | Nicaragua |

| GK | 23 | Leonel Moreira |
| RB | 16 | Cristian Gamboa |
| CB | 6 | Óscar Duarte |
| CB | 19 | Kendall Waston | (yellow card) 16' |
| LB | 8 | Bryan Oviedo |
| RM | 5 | Celso Borges (c) |
| CM | 13 | Allan Cruz |
| CM | 20 | Elías Aguilar | | (substituted off) 78' |
| LM | 12 | Joel Campbell |
| CF | 14 | Jonathan McDonald | | (substituted off) 76' |
| CF | 11 | Mayron George | | (substituted off) 60' |
Substitutions:
| MF | 10 | Bryan Ruiz | | (substituted on) 60' |
| FW | 9 | Álvaro Saborío | | (substituted on) 76' |
| MF | 2 | Randall Leal | | (substituted on) 78' |
Manager:
(Uruguay) Gustavo Matosas

| GK | 1 | Justo Lorente |
| RB | 2 | Josué Quijano |
| CB | 5 | Carlos Montenegro |
| CB | 6 | Luis Copete | (yellow card) 80' |
| LB | 3 | Manuel Rosas |
| CM | 8 | Marlon López |
| CM | 17 | Renato Punyed | | (substituted off) 38' |
| RW | 11 | Juan Barrera (c) |
| AM | 15 | Byron Bonilla | | (substituted off) 85' |
| LW | 21 | Francisco Flores | | (substituted off) 46' |
| CF | 18 | Jorge Betancur |
Substitutions:
| MF | 9 | Daniel Cadena | | (substituted on) 38' |
| FW | 7 | Carlos Chavarría | | (substituted on) 46' |
| MF | 16 | Armanto Gkoufas | | (substituted on) 85' |
Manager:
(Costa Rica) Henry Duarte

Man of the Match:
Celso Borges (Costa Rica)

Assistant referees:
Miguel Hernández (Mexico)
Caleb Wales (Trinidad and Tobago)
Fourth official:
Diego Montaño (Mexico)

=== Nicaragua vs Haiti ===
20 June 2019
19:00 (18:00 UTC−5)

| Nicaragua | 0–2 | Haiti |
|---|---|---|
| | Report | Saba 22'; Rosas 33' (o.g.) |

Toyota Stadium, Frisco
Attendance: 7,000
Referee: Mario Escobar (Guatemala)

| Nicaragua | Haiti |

| GK | 12 | Henry Maradiaga |
| RB | 2 | Josué Quijano |
| CB | 20 | Oscar López | (yellow card) 20' |
| CB | 6 | Luis Copete |
| LB | 3 | Manuel Rosas | | (substituted off) 67' |
| CM | 17 | Renato Punyed | | (substituted off) 78' |
| CM | 14 | Kevin Serapio | (yellow card) 89' |
| CM | 9 | Daniel Cadena | | (substituted off) 46' |
| RF | 11 | Juan Barrera (c) |
| CF | 15 | Byron Bonilla |
| LF | 18 | Jorge Betancur |
Substitutions:
| FW | 10 | Luis Galeano | | (substituted on) 46' |
| DF | 21 | Francisco Flores | | (substituted on) 67' |
| MF | 16 | Armanto Gkoufas | | (substituted on) 78' |
Manager:
(Costa Rica) Henry Duarte

| GK | 1 | Johny Placide (c) |
| RB | 2 | Carlens Arcus | (yellow card) 13' |
| CB | 16 | Andrew Jean-Baptiste |
| CB | 6 | Jems Geffrard |
| LB | 10 | Wilde-Donald Guerrier | (yellow card) 66' | (substituted off) 81' |
| CM | 21 | Bryan Alceus |
| CM | 8 | Zachary Herivaux |
| CM | 19 | Steeven Saba | | (substituted off) 72' |
| RF | 11 | Derrick Etienne Jr. | (yellow card) 84' |
| CF | 9 | Duckens Nazon |
| LF | 20 | Frantzdy Pierrot | (yellow card) 75' | (substituted off) 78' |
Substitutions:
| FW | 15 | Mikaël Cantave | | (substituted on) 72' |
| FW | 18 | Jonel Désiré | | (substituted on) 78' |
| DF | 22 | Alex Junior Christian | | (substituted on) 81' |
Manager:
(Martinique) Marc Collat

Man of the Match:
Steeven Saba (Haiti)

Assistant referees:
Humberto Panjoj (Guatemala)
Zachari Zeegelaar (Suriname)
Fourth official:
Armando Villareal (United States)

=== Costa Rica vs Bermuda ===
20 June 2019
21:30 (20:30 UTC−5)

| Costa Rica | 2–1 | Bermuda |
|---|---|---|
| George 30'; Aguilar 54' | Report | Wells 59' (pen.) |

Toyota Stadium, Frisco
Attendance: 7,000
Referee: Yadel Martínez (Cuba)

| Costa Rica | Bermuda |

| GK | 23 | Leonel Moreira |
| RB | 16 | Cristian Gamboa |
| CB | 6 | Óscar Duarte | (yellow card) 13' |
| CB | 19 | Kendall Waston |
| LB | 8 | Bryan Oviedo |
| RM | 5 | Celso Borges (c) |
| CM | 13 | Allan Cruz |
| CM | 20 | Elías Aguilar | | (substituted off) 72' |
| LM | 12 | Joel Campbell | | (substituted off) 70' |
| CF | 11 | Mayron George |
| CF | 14 | Jonathan McDonald | | (substituted off) 46' |
Substitutions:
| MF | 10 | Bryan Ruiz | (yellow card) 76' | (substituted on) 46' |
| MF | 7 | Christian Bolaños | | (substituted on) 70' |
| DF | 22 | Rónald Matarrita | | (substituted on) 72' |
Manager:
(Uruguay) Gustavo Matosas

| GK | 1 | Dale Eve |
| RB | 8 | Donte Brangman |
| CB | 5 | Oliver Harvey |
| CB | 6 | Jaylon Bather | (yellow card) 27' |
| LB | 16 | Dante Leverock (c) |
| DM | 19 | Reggie Lambe |
| CM | 15 | Milan Butterfield |
| CM | 11 | Willie Clemons | | (substituted off) 72' |
| RW | 13 | Osagi Bascome | | (substituted off) 80' |
| LW | 10 | Zeiko Lewis | | (substituted off) 72' |
| CF | 21 | Nahki Wells |
Substitutions:
| DF | 17 | Justin Donawa | | (substituted on) 72' |
| MF | 18 | Tre Ming | (yellow card) 85' | (substituted on) 72' |
| FW | 9 | Jonte Smith | | (substituted on) 80' |
Manager:
Kyle Lightbourne

Man of the Match:
Elías Aguilar (Costa Rica)

Assistant referees:
Christian Ramírez (Honduras)
Kyle Atkins (United States)
Fourth official:
Oliver Vergara (Panama)

=== Bermuda vs Nicaragua ===
24 June 2019
18:30

| Bermuda | 2–0 | Nicaragua |
|---|---|---|
| Simmons 60'; Wells 71' | Report |

Red Bull Arena, Harrison
Attendance: 20,044
Referee: Adonai Escobedo (Mexico)

| Bermuda | Nicaragua |

| GK | 1 | Dale Eve |
| RB | 8 | Donte Brangman |
| CB | 16 | Dante Leverock (c) |
| CB | 6 | Jaylon Bather |
| LB | 3 | Calon Minors | | (substituted off) 53' |
| RM | 7 | Lejuan Simmons | (yellow card) 24' | (substituted off) 73' |
| CM | 13 | Osagi Bascome |
| CM | 22 | Marco Warren | | (substituted off) 79' |
| LM | 11 | Willie Clemons |
| SS | 10 | Zeiko Lewis |
| CF | 21 | Nahki Wells |
Substitutions:
| DF | 5 | Oliver Harvey | | (substituted on) 53' |
| FW | 14 | Cecoy Robinson | | (substituted on) 73' |
| DF | 4 | Roger Lee | | (substituted on) 79' |
Manager:
Kyle Lightbourne

| GK | 12 | Henry Maradiaga |
| RB | 2 | Josué Quijano |
| CB | 20 | Óscar López |
| CB | 6 | Luis Copete |
| LB | 3 | Manuel Rosas | | (substituted off) 70' |
| CM | 17 | Renato Punyed | | (substituted off) 64' |
| CM | 14 | Kevin Serapio | (yellow card) 84' |
| AM | 10 | Luis Galeano | | (substituted off) 84' |
| RF | 11 | Juan Barrera (c) |
| CF | 15 | Byron Bonilla | (yellow card) 90+2' |
| LF | 18 | Jorge Betancur |
Substitutions:
| FW | 16 | Armanto Gkoufas | | (substituted on) 64' |
| DF | 19 | Camphers Pérez | | (substituted on) 70' |
| MF | 9 | Daniel Cadena | | (substituted on) 84' |
Manager:
(Costa Rica) Henry Duarte

Man of the Match:
Lejuan Simmons (Bermuda)

Assistant referees:
Micheal Barwegen (Canada)
Zachari Zeegelaar (Suriname)
Fourth official:
José Torres (Puerto Rico)

=== Haiti vs Costa Rica ===
24 June 2019
21:00

| Haiti | 2–1 | Costa Rica |
|---|---|---|
| Nazon 57' (pen.); Alexis 81' | Report | Saborío 13' |

Red Bull Arena, Harrison
Attendance: 20,044
Referee: Ismail Elfath (United States)

| Haiti | Costa Rica |

| GK | 1 | Johny Placide (c) |
| RB | 5 | Djimy Alexis |
| CB | 6 | Jems Geffrard |
| CB | 16 | Andrew Jean-Baptiste |
| LB | 22 | Alex Christian |
| RM | 21 | Bryan Alceus | (substituted off) 78' |
| CM | 19 | Steeven Saba |
| CM | 18 | Jonel Désiré | (substituted off) 63' |
| LM | 11 | Derrick Etienne Jr. |
| CF | 7 | Hervé Bazile | (substituted off) 75' |
| CF | 9 | Duckens Nazon |
Substitutions:
| FW | 15 | Mikaël Cantave | (substituted on) 63' |
| MF | 14 | Charles Hérold Jr. | (substituted on) 75' |
| MF | 13 | Bicou Bissainthe | (substituted on) 78' |
Manager:
(Martinique) Marc Collat

| GK | 23 | Leonel Moreira |
| RB | 4 | Keysher Fuller |
| CB | 15 | Francisco Calvo |
| CB | 3 | Giancarlo González |
| LB | 22 | Ronald Matarrita |
| RM | 5 | Celso Borges |
| CM | 13 | Allan Cruz |
| CM | 2 | Randall Leal | (yellow card) 45' |
| LM | 10 | Bryan Ruiz (c) | | (substituted off) 70' |
| CF | 12 | Joel Campbell | | (substituted off) 80' |
| CF | 9 | Álvaro Saborío | (yellow card) 43' | (substituted off) 63' |
Substitutions:
| FW | 11 | Mayron George | | (substituted on) 63' |
| DF | 6 | Óscar Duarte | | (substituted on) 70' |
| MF | 20 | Elías Aguilar | | (substituted on) 80' |
Manager:
(Uruguay) Gustavo Matosas

Man of the Match:
Duckens Nazon (Haiti)

Assistant referees:
Corey Parker (United States)
Kyle Atkins (United States)
Fourth official:
Oshane Nation (Jamaica)

== Discipline ==
Fair play points would have been used as tiebreakers if the overall and head-to-head records of teams were tied. These were calculated based on yellow and red cards received in all group matches as follows:

- first yellow card: minus 1 point;
- indirect red card (second yellow card): minus 3 points;
- direct red card: minus 4 points;
- yellow card and direct red card: minus 5 points;

Only one of the above deductions were applied to a player in a single match.

| Team | Match 1 | | | | Match 2 | | | | Match 3 | | | | Points |
| Team | Booked | (yellow card) (yellow-red card) | Sent off (straight red) | (yellow card) (red card) | Booked | (yellow card) (yellow-red card) | Sent off (straight red) | (yellow card) (red card) | Booked | (yellow card) (yellow-red card) | Sent off (straight red) | (yellow card) (red card) | Points |
|---|---|---|---|---|---|---|---|---|---|---|---|---|---|
| Bermuda | 1 | | | | 2 | | | | 1 | | | | −4 |
| Costa Rica | 1 | | | | 2 | | | | 2 | | | | −5 |
| Haiti | 1 | | | | 4 | | | | | | | | −5 |
| Nicaragua | 1 | | | | 2 | | | | 2 | | | | −5 |
