= 2019 CONCACAF Gold Cup knockout stage =

Football tournament knockout stage

The knockout stage of the 2019 CONCACAF Gold Cup began on 29 June with the quarter-finals and ended on 7 July 2019 with the final at Soldier Field in Chicago.

All match times listed are EDT (UTC−4), as listed by CONCACAF. If the venue is located in a different time zone, the local time is also given.

== Format ==
In the knockout stage, if a match was level at the end of 90 minutes of normal playing time, extra time was played (two periods of 15 minutes each), where each team was allowed to make a fourth substitution. If still tied after extra time, the match was decided by a penalty shoot-out to determine the winners.

CONCACAF set out the following matchups for the quarter-finals:

- Match 1: Winners Group B vs Runners-up Group A
- Match 2: Winners Group A vs Runners-up Group B
- Match 3: Winners Group C vs Runners-up Group D
- Match 4: Winners Group D vs Runners-up Group C

== Qualified teams ==
The top two placed teams from each of the four groups qualified for the knockout stage.

Group	Winners	Runners-up
A	Mexico	Canada
B	Haiti	Costa Rica
C	Jamaica	Curaçao
D	United States	Panama

== Bracket ==
Quarter-finals
29 June – Houston (NRG)
Haiti	3
Canada	2
29 June – Houston (NRG)
Mexico (p)	1 (5)
Costa Rica	1 (4)
30 June – Philadelphia
Jamaica	1
Panama	0
30 June – Philadelphia
United States	1
Curaçao	0

Semi-finals
2 July – Glendale
Haiti	0
Mexico (a.e.t.)	1
3 July – Nashville
Jamaica	1
United States	3

Final
7 July – Chicago
Mexico	1
United States	0

== Quarter-finals ==
=== Haiti vs Canada ===
29 June 2019
19:00 (18:00 UTC−5)

Haiti	3–2	Canada
Nazon 50'; Bazile 70' (pen.); Guerrier 76'	Report	David 18'; Cavallini 28'

NRG Stadium, Houston
Attendance: 70,788
Referee: Jair Marrufo (United States)

Haiti	Canada

GK	1	Johny Placide (c)
RB	2	Carlens Arcus
CB	6	Jems Geffrard
CB	16	Andrew Jean-Baptiste
LB	22	Alex Junior Christian
CM	21	Bryan Alceus
CM	19	Steeven Saba	(yellow card) 84'	(substituted off) 90+3'
CM	10	Wilde-Donald Guerrier		(substituted off) 83'
RF	7	Hervé Bazile
CF	20	Frantzdy Pierrot		(substituted off) 62'
LF	9	Duckens Nazon
Substitutions:
FW	11	Derrick Etienne Jr.		(substituted on) 62'
MF	8	Zachary Herivaux		(substituted on) 83'
MF	13	Bicou Bissainthe		(substituted on) 90+3'
Manager:
(Martinique) Marc Collat

GK	18	Milan Borjan
RB	23	Marcus Godinho
CB	4	Derek Cornelius
CB	15	Doneil Henry	(yellow card) 56'
LB	12	Alphonso Davies
DM	13	Atiba Hutchinson (c)
CM	8	Scott Arfield
CM	21	Jonathan Osorio		(substituted off) 64'
RF	19	Lucas Cavallini		(substituted off) 79'
CF	20	Jonathan David
LF	10	Junior Hoilett
Substitutions:
MF	14	Mark-Anthony Kaye		(substituted on) 64'
DF	3	Ashtone Morgan		(substituted on) 79'
Manager:
(England) John Herdman

Man of the Match:
Duckens Nazon (Haiti)

Assistant referees:
Frank Anderson (United States)
Corey Parker (United States)
Fourth official:
Ismail Elfath (United States)

=== Mexico vs Costa Rica ===
29 June 2019
22:00 (21:00 UTC−5)

Mexico	1–1 (a.e.t.)	Costa Rica
Jiménez 44'	Report	Ruiz 52' (pen.)
Penalties
Jiménez (penalty missed); Montes (penalty scored); Alvarado (penalty scored); Gallardo (penalty scored); Moreno (penalty scored); Salcedo (penalty scored)	5–4	(penalty scored) Borges; (penalty scored) Aguilar; (penalty missed) Leal; (penalty scored) Duarte; (penalty scored) Calvo; (penalty missed) Fuller

NRG Stadium, Houston
Attendance: 70,788
Referee: John Pitti (Panama)

Mexico	Costa Rica

GK	13	Guillermo Ochoa
RB	21	Luis Rodríguez	(yellow card) 51'
CB	2	Néstor Araujo		(substituted off) 106'
CB	3	Carlos Salcedo	(yellow card) 21'
LB	4	Edson Álvarez
CM	6	Jonathan dos Santos	(yellow card) 34'	(substituted off) 90'
CM	18	Andrés Guardado (c)		(substituted off) 84'
CM	23	Jesús Gallardo
RF	20	Rodolfo Pizarro
CF	9	Raúl Jiménez
LF	22	Uriel Antuna		(substituted off) 85'
Substitutions:
MF	8	Carlos Rodríguez	(yellow card) 101'	(substituted on) 84'
MF	11	Roberto Alvarado		(substituted on) 85'
MF	10	Luis Montes		(substituted on) 90'
DF	15	Héctor Moreno		(substituted on) 106'
Manager:
(Argentina) Gerardo Martino			(yellow card) 93'

GK	23	Leonel Moreira
RB	6	Óscar Duarte	(yellow card) 69'
CB	19	Kendall Waston
CB	8	Bryan Oviedo		(substituted off) 99'
LB	4	Keysher Fuller	(yellow card) 61'
RM	5	Celso Borges
CM	2	Randall Leal
CM	13	Allan Cruz	(yellow card) 120'
LM	10	Bryan Ruiz (c)	(yellow card) 24'	(substituted off) 111'
CF	11	Mayron George		(substituted off) 72'
CF	12	Joel Campbell		(substituted off) 102'
Substitutions:
FW	14	Jonathan McDonald		(substituted on) 72'
DF	15	Francisco Calvo		(substituted on) 99'
DF	16	Cristian Gamboa	(yellow card) 113'	(substituted on) 102'
MF	20	Elías Aguilar		(substituted on) 111'
Manager:
(Uruguay) Gustavo Matosas			(yellow card) 80'

Man of the Match:
Guillermo Ochoa (Mexico)

Assistant referees:
Walter López (Honduras)
Zachari Zeegelaar (Suriname)
Fourth official:
Daneon Parchment (Jamaica)

=== Jamaica vs Panama ===
30 June 2019
17:30

Jamaica	1–0	Panama
Mattocks 75' (pen.)	Report

Lincoln Financial Field, Philadelphia
Attendance: 26,233
Referee: Mario Escobar (Guatemala)

Jamaica	Panama

GK	1	Andre Blake (c)
RB	5	Alvas Powell
CB	14	Shaun Francis
CB	3	Michael Hector	(yellow card) 49'
LB	20	Kemar Lawrence
RM	17	Damion Lowe
CM	7	Leon Bailey
CM	6	Dever Orgill		(substituted off) 73'
LM	15	Je-Vaughn Watson
CF	11	Shamar Nicholson	(yellow card) 90'	(substituted off) 90'
CF	12	Junior Flemmings
Substitutions:
FW	10	Darren Mattocks		(substituted on) 73'
DF	2	Jamoi Topey		(substituted on) 90'
Manager:
Theodore Whitmore

GK	1	Luis Mejía
RB	23	Michael Amir Murillo
CB	5	Román Torres (c)		(substituted off) 60'
CB	3	Harold Cummings
LB	15	Erick Davis
RM	10	Yoel Bárcenas	(yellow card) 86'
CM	4	Fidel Escobar
CM	11	Armando Cooper		(substituted off) 89'
LM	19	Alberto Quintero		(substituted off) 84'
CF	18	Abdiel Arroyo
CF	9	Gabriel Torres
Substitutions:
MF	21	Omar Browne		(substituted on) 60'
FW	16	Rolando Blackburn		(substituted on) 84'
MF	14	Valentín Pimentel		(substituted on) 89'
Manager:
Julio Dely Valdés

Man of the Match:
Darren Mattocks (Jamaica)

Assistant referees:
Gerson López (Guatemala)
Humberto Panjoj (Guatemala)
Fourth official:
Juan Gabriel Calderón (Costa Rica)

=== United States vs Curaçao ===
30 June 2019
20:00

United States	1–0	Curaçao
McKennie 25'	Report

Lincoln Financial Field, Philadelphia
Attendance: 26,233
Referee: Adonai Escobedo (Mexico)

United States	Curaçao

GK	1	Zack Steffen
RB	2	Nick Lima
CB	23	Aaron Long
CB	13	Walker Zimmerman
LB	5	Tim Ream
DM	4	Michael Bradley
CM	10	Christian Pulisic (c)
CM	8	Weston McKennie
RW	21	Tyler Boyd	(substituted off) 63'
LW	7	Paul Arriola	(substituted off) 90'
CF	9	Gyasi Zardes
Substitutions:
FW	11	Jordan Morris	(substituted on) 63'
DF	3	Omar Gonzalez	(substituted on) 90'
Manager:
Gregg Berhalter

GK	1	Eloy Room
RB	13	Juriën Gaari
CB	2	Cuco Martina (c)
CB	4	Darryl Lachman
LB	21	Ayrton Statie		(substituted off) 68'
RM	10	Leandro Bacuna
CM	18	Elson Hooi	(yellow card) 70'
CM	15	Shermaine Martina	(yellow card) 30'	(substituted off) 80'
LM	14	Kenji Gorré		(substituted off) 75'
CF	11	Gevaro Nepomuceno
CF	19	Jafar Arias
Substitutions:
DF	5	Jurich Carolina		(substituted on) 68'
FW	16	Gino van Kessel		(substituted on) 75'
MF	6	Michaël Maria		(substituted on) 80'
Manager:
Remko Bicentini

Man of the Match:
Christian Pulisic (United States)

Assistant referees:
Alberto Morín (Mexico)
Miguel Hernández (Mexico)
Fourth official:
Saíd Martínez (Honduras)

== Semi-finals ==
=== Haiti vs Mexico ===
2 July 2019
22:30 (19:30 UTC−7)

Haiti	0–1 (a.e.t.)	Mexico
	Report	Jiménez 93' (pen.)

State Farm Stadium, Glendale
Attendance: 64,128
Referee: Abdulrahman Al-Jassim (Qatar)

Haiti	Mexico

GK	1	Johny Placide (c)
RB	6	Jems Geffrard
CB	16	Andrew Jean-Baptiste
CB	22	Alex Junior Christian
LB	2	Carlens Arcus
CM	21	Bryan Alceus	(yellow card) 14'
CM	19	Steeven Saba		(substituted off) 99'
CM	10	Wilde-Donald Guerrier		(substituted off) 100'
RF	7	Hervé Bazile
CF	20	Frantzdy Pierrot		(substituted off) 83'
LF	9	Duckens Nazon		(substituted off) 69'
Substitutions:
FW	11	Derrick Etienne Jr.		(substituted on) 69'
FW	18	Jonel Désiré		(substituted on) 83'
MF	8	Zachary Herivaux		(substituted on) 99'
FW	15	Mikaël Cantave		(substituted on) 100'
Manager:
(Martinique) Marc Collat

GK	13	Guillermo Ochoa
RB	21	Luis Rodríguez	(yellow card) 89'
CB	3	Carlos Salcedo
CB	4	Edson Álvarez		(substituted off) 91'
LB	15	Héctor Moreno	(yellow card) 83'
RM	6	Jonathan dos Santos		(substituted off) 105'
CM	18	Andrés Guardado (c)		(substituted off) 68'
CM	23	Jesús Gallardo
LM	11	Roberto Alvarado		(substituted off) 68'
CF	20	Rodolfo Pizarro
CF	9	Raúl Jiménez
Substitutions:
MF	8	Carlos Rodríguez		(substituted on) 68'
MF	22	Uriel Antuna		(substituted on) 68'
DF	5	Diego Reyes		(substituted on) 91'
MF	10	Luis Montes		(substituted on) 105'
Assistant coach:
(Argentina) Jorge Theiler (Note: Due to the one-match suspension of Mexican head coach Gerardo Martino for receiving two yellow cards during the tournament, assistant coach Jorge Theiler took his place on the bench.)

Man of the Match:
Raúl Jiménez (Mexico)

Assistant referees:
Taleb Al Marri (Qatar)
Saoud Al Maqaleh (Qatar)
Fourth official:
Henry Bejarano (Costa Rica)

=== Jamaica vs United States ===
At 19:56 Central Time, in the 16th minute, the match was interrupted due to severe weather. The match resumed 88 minutes later at 22:24.

3 July 2019
21:30 (20:30 UTC−5)

Jamaica	1–3	United States
Nicholson 69'	Report	McKennie 9'; Pulisic 52', 87'

Nissan Stadium, Nashville
Attendance: 28,473
Referee: Iván Barton (El Salvador)

Jamaica	United States

GK	1	Andre Blake (c)
RB	5	Alvas Powell
CB	14	Shaun Francis
CB	3	Michael Hector
LB	20	Kemar Lawrence
CM	22	Devon Williams
CM	7	Leon Bailey
CM	15	Je-Vaughn Watson	(yellow card) 40'
RF	10	Darren Mattocks		(substituted off) 74'
CF	12	Junior Flemmings	(yellow card) 44'	(substituted off) 65'
LF	16	Peter-Lee Vassell	(yellow card) 49'	(substituted off) 83'
Substitutions:
FW	11	Shamar Nicholson		(substituted on) 65'
FW	18	Brian Brown		(substituted on) 74'
MF	4	Andre Lewis		(substituted on) 83'
Manager:
Theodore Whitmore

GK	1	Zack Steffen
CB	14	Aaron Long
CB	13	Matt Miazga
CB	19	Tim Ream (c)
RM	23	Reggie Cannon
CM	4	Michael Bradley
CM	8	Weston McKennie	(yellow card) 32'
LM	10	Christian Pulisic
RF	7	Paul Arriola		(substituted off) 87'
CF	17	Jozy Altidore	(yellow card) 44'	(substituted off) 55'
LF	11	Jordan Morris		(substituted off) 70'
Substitutions:
FW	9	Gyasi Zardes		(substituted on) 55'
MF	15	Cristian Roldan		(substituted on) 70'
DF	16	Daniel Lovitz		(substituted on) 87'
Manager:
Gregg Berhalter

Man of the Match:
Christian Pulisic (United States)

Assistant referees:
Juan Zumba (El Salvador)
David Morán (El Salvador)
Fourth official:
Saíd Martínez (Honduras)

== Final ==
July 7, 2019
21:15 (20:15 UTC−5)

Mexico	1–0	United States
Dos Santos 73'	Report

Soldier Field, Chicago
Attendance: 62,493
Referee: Mario Escobar (Guatemala)

Mexico	United States

GK	13	Guillermo Ochoa
RB	21	Luis Rodríguez
CB	3	Carlos Salcedo
CB	15	Héctor Moreno
LB	23	Jesús Gallardo
CM	6	Jonathan dos Santos
CM	4	Edson Álvarez
CM	18	Andrés Guardado (c)	(substituted off) 89'
RF	22	Uriel Antuna	(substituted off) 86'
CF	9	Raúl Jiménez
LF	20	Rodolfo Pizarro	(substituted off) 81'
Substitutions:
MF	8	Carlos Rodríguez	(substituted on) 81'
FW	11	Roberto Alvarado	(substituted on) 86'
DF	5	Diego Reyes	(substituted on) 89'
Manager:
(Argentina) Gerardo Martino

GK	1	Zack Steffen
RB	14	Reggie Cannon
CB	19	Matt Miazga
CB	23	Aaron Long
LB	13	Tim Ream	(substituted off) 83'
CM	8	Weston McKennie (c)
CM	10	Christian Pulisic
CM	4	Michael Bradley
RF	11	Jordan Morris	(substituted off) 61'
CF	17	Jozy Altidore	(substituted off) 64'
LF	7	Paul Arriola
Substitutions:
MF	15	Cristian Roldan	(substituted on) 61'
FW	9	Gyasi Zardes	(substituted on) 64'
DF	16	Daniel Lovitz	(substituted on) 83'
Manager:
Gregg Berhalter

Man of the Match:
Jonathan dos Santos (Mexico)

Assistant referees:
William Arrieta (Costa Rica)
Humberto Panjoj (Guatemala)
Fourth official:
Juan Gabriel Calderón (Costa Rica)
