= Brangman =

Brangman is a surname. Notable people with the surname include:

- Derrick Brangman (born 1987), Bermudian cricketer
- Donte Brangman (born 1994), Bermudian footballer
- Goldie Brangman-Dumpson (1917–2020), American nurse and educator
- Ricardo Brangman (born 1980), Bermudian cricketer
