= 2018–19 Bermudian Premier Division =

Bermudian Premier Division
- Season: 2018–19
- Champions: PHC Zebras
- Relegated: Paget Lions
- Caribbean Club Shield: PHC Zebras
- Matches: 90
- Biggest home win: BAA 6–1 BBZ (22 September 2018)
- Biggest away win: BAA 1–7 PHC (6 October 2018)
- Highest scoring: 8 goals: (twice)
- Longest winning run: 4 matches X-Roads Warriors (16 September – present)
- Longest unbeaten run: 4 matches X-Roads Warriors (16 September – present)
- Longest winless run: 4 matches Boulevard Blazers; Somerset Trojans (16 September – present)
- Longest losing run: 4 matches Boulevard Blazers; Somerset Trojans (16 September – present)

The 2018–19 Bermudian Premier Division is the 56th season of the Bermudian Premier Division, the top division football competition in Bermuda. The season began on 15 September 2018. Many league games took place in front of dozens of spectators.

== Teams ==
Ten teams compete in the league – the top eight teams from the previous season, and two teams promoted from the Bermuda First Division. The new teams this season are BAA Wanderers and Paget Lions, who replace Flanagan's Onions and YMSC Bluebirds.

Team	Home city	Home ground	Capacity
BAA Wanderers	Hamilton	Goose Gosling Field	700
Boulevard Blazers	Pembroke	Police Field	7,000
Dandy Town Hornets	Pembroke	St. John's Field	400
Devonshire Cougars	Devonshire	Bermuda National Stadium	8,500
North Village Rams	Hamilton	Bermuda National Stadium	8,500
Paget Lions	Southampton	Southampton Rangers Field	1,000
PHC Zebras	Warwick	PHC Field	500
Robin Hood	Pembroke	Goose Gosling Field	700
Somerset Trojans	Sandys	Somerset Cricket Club Field	1,500
X-Roads Warriors	Smith's	Warrior Park	400

== League table ==
Pos	Team	Pld	W	D	L	GF	GA	GD	Pts	Qualification or relegation
1	PHC Zebras (C)	18	14	1	3	43	14	+29	43	Caribbean Club Shield
2	Robin Hood	18	11	6	1	55	22	+33	39	
3	Dandy Town Hornets	18	11	2	5	48	34	+14	35	
4	Devonshire Cougars	18	7	5	6	31	28	+3	26	
5	X-Roads Warriors	18	7	4	7	47	37	+10	25	
6	BAA Wanderers	18	7	2	9	39	55	−16	23	
7	Boulevard Blazers	18	6	3	9	36	53	−17	21	
8	North Village Rams	18	5	3	10	27	35	−8	18	
9	Somerset Trojans	18	2	5	11	27	47	−20	11	Reprieved from relegation (Note: Somerset Trojans were reprieved from relegation after BAA Wanderers withdrew from the league at the end of the 2018–19 season.)
10	Paget Lions (R)	18	2	5	11	22	50	−28	11	Relegated to Bermuda First Division

Source: Soccerway
(C) Champions; (R) Relegated
