= Jaami Qureshi =

English-Malaysian footballer (born 2004)

- Qureshi in 2026

Personal information
- Full name: Jaami Qureshi
- Date of birth: 2 February 2004 (age 22)
- Place of birth: London, England
- Height: 5 ft 11 in (1.80 m)
- Position: Forward

Team information
- Current team: USC Upstate

Youth career
- Years: Team
- 2016–2022: Brighton & Hove Albion

Jaami Qureshi (born 2 February 2004) is an English professional footballer who plays in America’s Collegiate NCAA D1 level as a forward for now at USC upstate soccer previously playing in England for Brighton & Hove Albion Fc .

== Early life ==
As a schoolboy, Qureshi competed nationally at long-jumper and 100m, recording a personal best of 10.9 seconds in the 100-meter dash, and 6.50 meters in the long jump.

== Club career ==
As a youth player, Qureshi joined the youth academy of English side Brighton & Hove Albion Fc from ages 12 to 18. He helped the club win the 2021 U17 Premier League Cup. After leaving Brighton he suffered an anterior cruciate ligament injury and now plays in America, collegiate NCAA Division I for USC Upstate.

== Style of play ==
Qureshi mainly operates as a winger or attacking midfielder and is two-footed.
