= 2022–23 CONCACAF Nations League B =

Tournament details
- Dates: 2 June 2022 – 28 March 2023
- Teams: 16
- Promoted: Cuba; Haiti; Trinidad and Tobago; Guatemala

Tournament statistics
- Matches played: 47
- Goals scored: 127 (2.7 per match)
- Top scorer: (Haiti) Carnejy Antoine (5 goals)

The 2022–23 CONCACAF Nations League B was the second division of the 2022–23 edition of the CONCACAF Nations League, the second season of the international football competition involving the men's national teams of the 41 member associations of CONCACAF. It was held from 2 June 2022 to 28 March 2023.

The top four teams in the Nations League B qualified to the 2023 CONCACAF Gold Cup, and the next best four teams entered the 2023 CONCACAF Gold Cup qualification.

== Format ==
League B consisted of sixteen teams. The league was split into four groups of four teams. The teams competed in a home-and-away, round-robin format over the course of the group phase, with matches being played in the official FIFA match windows in June 2022 and March 2023. The first-placed team in each group was promoted to League A and qualified for the 2023 CONCACAF Gold Cup, with the second-placed teams entering the 2023 CONCACAF Gold Cup qualification tournament. As a result of a format change, no teams were relegated this season.

=== Team changes ===
The following were the team changes of League B from the 2019–20 season:

Incoming
Relegated from Nations League A	Promoted from Nations League C
Bermuda; Cuba; Haiti; Trinidad and Tobago	Bahamas; Barbados; Guadeloupe; Guatemala

Outgoing
Promoted to Nations League A	Relegated to Nations League C
El Salvador; Grenada; Jamaica; Suriname	Aruba; Dominica; Saint Kitts and Nevis; Saint Lucia

=== Seeding ===
The draw for the league phase took place in Miami, Florida, United States on 4 April 2022, 19:00 EDT. Each of the League's draws began by randomly selecting a team from Pot 1 and placing them in Group A of their respective league. The draws continued by selecting the remaining teams from Pot 1 and positioning them into Groups B, C and D in sequential order. The same procedure was done for the remaining pots. Teams were seeded into pots using CONCACAF Ranking.

Pot 1
Team	Pts	Rank
Haiti	1,432	7
Guatemala	1,417	8
Trinidad and Tobago	1,232	13
Cuba	1,096	14

Pot 2
Team	Pts	Rank
French Guiana	1,030	16
Guadeloupe	1,011	17
Nicaragua	986	18
Bermuda	973	19

Pot 3
Team	Pts	Rank
Antigua and Barbuda	953	20
Guyana	924	21
Dominican Republic	872	23
Saint Vincent and the Grenadines	865	24

Pot 4
Team	Pts	Rank
Belize	795	26
Montserrat	767	27
Barbados	674	31
Bahamas	538	33

== Groups ==
The fixture list was confirmed by CONCACAF on 6 April 2022.

All match times are in EDT (UTC−4) as listed by CONCACAF (local times, if different, are in parentheses).

=== Group A ===
Pos	Team	Pld	W	D	L	GF	GA	GD	Pts	Promotion or qualification	(Cuba)	(Guadeloupe)	(Antigua and Barbuda)	(Barbados)
1	Cuba (P)	6	5	0	1	11	3	+8	15	Promotion and Gold Cup	—	1–0	3–1	3–0
2	Guadeloupe	6	3	0	3	5	5	0	9	Advance to Gold Cup prelims	2–1	—	0–1	2–1
3	Antigua and Barbuda (Note: Antigua and Barbuda was awarded a Gold Cup preliminary round berth as the best-performing third place team.)	6	3	0	3	5	7	−2	9	Advance to Gold Cup prelims	0–2	1–0	—	1–2
4	Barbados	6	1	0	5	3	9	−6	3		0–1	0–1	0–1	—

Source: CONCACAF
Rules for classification: Tiebreakers
(P) Promoted
Notes:
2 June 2022
19:30

Barbados	0–1	Antigua and Barbuda
	Report	Philip 90+1'

Daren Sammy Cricket Ground, Gros Islet (Saint Lucia) (Note: Barbados played their home matches against Antigua and Barbuda and Guadeloupe at the Daren Sammy Cricket Ground, Gros Islet (Saint Lucia) due to health restrictions related to the COVID-19 pandemic in Barbados.)
Referee: Moeth Gaymes (Saint Vincent and the Grenadines)
2 June 2022
20:00

Guadeloupe	2–1	Cuba
Gendrey 15'; Ambrose 90'	Report	M. Reyes 74'

Stade René Serge Nabajoth, Les Abymes
Referee: José Torres (Puerto Rico)

5 June 2022
16:00

Cuba	3–0	Barbados
Pozo 35'; A. Hernández 38'; Paradela 47' (pen.)	Report

Estadio Antonio Maceo, Santiago de Cuba
Referee: Marco Ortíz (Mexico)
5 June 2022
19:00

Antigua and Barbuda	1–0	Guadeloupe
Weston 55'	Report

Warner Park, Basseterre (Saint Kitts and Nevis)
Referee: Reginald Gumbs (Saint Kitts and Nevis)

9 June 2022
18:00

Barbados	0–1	Guadeloupe
	Report	Ambrose 16'

Daren Sammy Cricket Ground, Gros Islet (Saint Lucia)
Referee: Raúl Castro (Honduras)
9 June 2022
19:00

Antigua and Barbuda	0–2	Cuba
	Report	Paradela 16'; O. Hernández 83'

Warner Park, Basseterre (Saint Kitts and Nevis)
Referee: Kimbell Ward (Saint Kitts and Nevis)

12 June 2022
16:00

Cuba	3–1	Antigua and Barbuda
A. Hernández 16', 21', 63'	Report	Bishop 51'

Estadio Antonio Maceo, Santiago de Cuba
Referee: Guillermo Pacheco (Mexico)
12 June 2022
18:00

Guadeloupe	2–1	Barbados
Ambrose 6'; Phaëton 27' (pen.)	Report	Atkins 59'

Stade René Serge Nabajoth, Les Abymes
Referee: Melvin Matamoros (Honduras)

23 March 2023
19:00

Barbados	0–1	Cuba
	Report	M. Reyes 3'

Wildey Turf, Wildey
Referee: Walter López (Guatemala)
23 March 2023
19:00

Guadeloupe	0–1	Antigua and Barbuda
	Report	Nathaniel-George 57'

Stade René Serge Nabajoth, Les Abymes
Referee: Pierre-Luc Lauzière (Canada)

26 March 2023
16:00 (Note: The Antigua and Barbuda v Barbados and Cuba v Guadeloupe matches, originally scheduled at 15:00 EDT (UTC−4), were rescheduled to 16:00 EDT.)

Antigua and Barbuda	1–2	Barbados
Weston 31'	Report	Gale 62'; James 87'

Sir Vivian Richards Stadium, North Sound
Referee: Ismael Cornejo (El Salvador)
26 March 2023
16:00

Cuba	1–0	Guadeloupe
Matos 45+2'	Report

Estadio Antonio Maceo, Santiago de Cuba
Referee: Ricardo Montero (Costa Rica)

=== Group B ===
Pos	Team	Pld	W	D	L	GF	GA	GD	Pts	Promotion or qualification	(Haiti)	(Guyana)	(Bermuda)	(Montserrat)
1	Haiti (P)	6	5	1	0	22	5	+17	16	Promotion and Gold Cup	—	6–0	3–1	3–2
2	Guyana	6	3	1	2	8	14	−6	10	Advance to Gold Cup prelims	2–6	—	2–1	0–0
3	Bermuda	6	1	1	4	7	10	−3	4		0–0	0–2	—	3–0
4	Montserrat	6	1	1	4	6	14	−8	4		0–4	1–2	3–2	—

Source: CONCACAF
Rules for classification: Tiebreakers
(P) Promoted
4 June 2022
17:00 (18:00 UTC−3)

Bermuda	0–0	Haiti
	Report

Dame Flora Duffy National Sports Centre, Devonshire Parish
Referee: Reon Radix (Grenada)
4 June 2022
19:30

Montserrat	1–2	Guyana
Clifton 21'	Report	Glasgow 61', 71'

Estadio Olímpico Félix Sánchez, Santo Domingo (Dominican Republic) (Note: Montserrat played their home matches against Guyana and Bermuda at the Estadio Olímpico Félix Sánchez in Santo Domingo (Dominican Republic) due to their regular Blakes Estate Stadium not meeting CONCACAF requirements.)
Referee: Jefferson Escobar (Honduras)

7 June 2022
16:00

Guyana	2–1	Bermuda
Bobb 35'; Glasgow 45+2'	Report	Leverock 42'

National Track and Field Centre Leonora, Leonora
Referee: Reon Radix (Grenada)
7 June 2022
17:00

Haiti	3–2	Montserrat
Prunier 5'; Antoine 9'; Saba 25'	Report	Simon 19'; Taylor 90+2' (pen.)

Estadio Olímpico Félix Sánchez, Santo Domingo (Dominican Republic) (Note: Haiti played their home matches against Montserrat and Guyana at the Estadio Olímpico Félix Sánchez in Santo Domingo (Dominican Republic) due to security reasons.)
Referee: David Gómez (Costa Rica)

11 June 2022
16:00

Guyana	2–6	Haiti
Welshman 11'; Moriah-Welsh 44'	Report	Jean 4'; Saba 9'; Antoine 38'; Etienne 41', 43'; Christophe 80'

National Track and Field Centre Leonora, Leonora
Referee: Luis Enrique Santander (Mexico)
11 June 2022
19:30

Montserrat	3–2	Bermuda
Taylor 47' (pen.), 85'; Clifton 67'	Report	Clemons 54'; Wells 78'

Estadio Olímpico Félix Sánchez, Santo Domingo (Dominican Republic)
Referee: Adonis Carrasco (Dominican Republic)

14 June 2022
18:00 (19:00 UTC−3)

Bermuda	3–0 Awarded (Note: The Bermuda v Montserrat match, scheduled for 14 June 2022, was cancelled due to Montserrat deciding to withdraw from the match. The match was later awarded to Bermuda as a 3–0 win.)	Montserrat
	Report

Dame Flora Duffy National Sports Centre, Devonshire Parish
Referee: Drew Fischer (Canada)
14 June 2022
18:00

Haiti	6–0	Guyana
Christian 39'; Prunier 48', 76'; Simonsen 63'; Antoine 87', 89'	Report

Estadio Olímpico Félix Sánchez, Santo Domingo (Dominican Republic)
Referee: Randy Encarnación (Dominican Republic)

25 March 2023
14:00 (15:00 UTC−3)

Bermuda	0–2	Guyana
	Report	Gordon 52'; Garrett 58'

Dame Flora Duffy National Sports Centre, Devonshire Parish
Referee: Fernando Hernández (Mexico)
25 March 2023
17:00

Montserrat	0–4	Haiti
	Report	Nazon 49'; Pierrot 60'; Etienne 70'; Prunier 84'

Blakes Estate Stadium, Lookout
Attendance: 650
Referee: Bryan López (Guatemala)

28 March 2023
18:00

Haiti	3–1	Bermuda
Pierrot 25', 26'; Antoine 45+4'	Report	Bean 75'

Estadio Panamericano, San Cristóbal (Dominican Republic)
Referee: Melvin Matamoros (Honduras)
28 March 2023
19:00

Guyana	0–0	Montserrat
	Report

Wildey Turf, Wildey (Barbados)
Referee: Keylor Herrera (Costa Rica)

=== Group C ===
Pos	Team	Pld	W	D	L	GF	GA	GD	Pts	Promotion or qualification	(Nicaragua)	(Trinidad and Tobago)	(The Bahamas)	(Saint Vincent and the Grenadines)
1	Nicaragua	6	4	2	0	15	5	+10	14	Disqualified (Note: Nicaragua was disqualified from the 2023 Gold Cup and Nations League A promotion due to fielding an ineligible player. Trinidad and Tobago took their place in both tournaments as the best runner-up in League B.)	—	2–1	4–0	4–1
2	Trinidad and Tobago (P)	6	4	1	1	12	4	+8	13	Promotion and Gold Cup	1–1	—	1–0	4–1
3	Bahamas	6	1	1	4	2	11	−9	4		0–2	0–3	—	1–0
4	Saint Vincent and the Grenadines	6	0	2	4	5	14	−9	2		2–2	0–2	1–1	—

Source: CONCACAF
Rules for classification: Tiebreakers
(P) Promoted
Notes:
3 June 2022
17:00

Bahamas	1–0	Saint Vincent and the Grenadines
St. Fleur 68' (pen.)	Report

Thomas Robinson Stadium, Nassau
Referee: Jorge Pérez (Mexico)
3 June 2022
22:00 (20:00 UTC−6)

Nicaragua	2–1	Trinidad and Tobago
Quijano 45+1'; Bonilla 78'	Report	Reyes 46' (o.g.)

Estadio Nacional de Fútbol, Managua
Referee: Keylor Herrera (Costa Rica)

6 June 2022
15:00

Saint Vincent and the Grenadines	2–2	Nicaragua
Solomon 3'; Anderson 45+5'	Report	Bonilla 22'; Moldskred 41'

Arnos Vale Stadium, Arnos Vale
Referee: Ken Pennyfeather (Antigua and Barbuda) (Note: Referee Benjamin Whitty from Cayman Islands, who was originally assigned to the Saint Vincent and the Grenadines v Nicaragua match, was replaced by Ken Pennyfeather from Antigua and Barbuda.)
6 June 2022
20:00

Trinidad and Tobago	1–0	Bahamas
Hackshaw 4'	Report

Hasely Crawford Stadium, Port of Spain
Attendance: 4,000
Referee: Shavin Greene (Guyana)

10 June 2022
15:00

Saint Vincent and the Grenadines	0–2	Trinidad and Tobago
	Report	Hackshaw 17'; L. García 25'

Arnos Vale Stadium, Arnos Vale
Referee: Alex Chilowicz (United States)
10 June 2022
17:00

Bahamas	0–2	Nicaragua
	Report	Moreno 40'; Moldskred 90+1'

Thomas Robinson Stadium, Nassau
Referee: Joe Dickerson (United States)

13 June 2022
19:00

Trinidad and Tobago	4–1	Saint Vincent and the Grenadines
J. García 9'; Powder 11', 41'; Rochford 90+1'	Report	Stewart 26'

Hasely Crawford Stadium, Port of Spain
Attendance: 4,000
Referee: Nelson Salgado (Honduras)
13 June 2022
20:00 (18:00 UTC−6)

Nicaragua	4–0	Bahamas
Barrera 19' (pen.); Moreno 34', 45'; Smith 74' (pen.)	Report

Estadio Nacional de Fútbol, Managua
Attendance: 20,000
Referee: Julio Luna (Guatemala)

24 March 2023
16:00

Bahamas	0–3	Trinidad and Tobago
	Report	Moses 5'; J. Jones 26'; Telfer 34'

Thomas Robinson Stadium, Nassau
Referee: Oshane Nation (Jamaica)
24 March 2023
20:00 (18:00 UTC−6)

Nicaragua	4–1	Saint Vincent and the Grenadines
Smith 3'; Barrera 42'; Moldskred 60'; Flores 90+2'	Report	Edwards 18' (pen.)

Estadio Nacional de Fútbol, Managua
Referee: Adonai Escobedo (Mexico)

27 March 2023
15:00

Saint Vincent and the Grenadines	1–1	Bahamas
Edwards 59' (pen.)	Report	Joseph 70'

Arnos Vale Stadium, Arnos Vale
Referee: Fernando Guerrero (Mexico)
27 March 2023
20:00

Trinidad and Tobago	1–1	Nicaragua
J. Jones 42'	Report	Smith 27'

Dwight Yorke Stadium, Bacolet
Referee: Armando Villarreal (United States)

=== Group D ===
Pos	Team	Pld	W	D	L	GF	GA	GD	Pts	Promotion or qualification	(Guatemala)	(French Guiana)	(Dominican Republic)	(Belize)
1	Guatemala (P)	6	4	1	1	11	4	+7	13	Promotion and Gold Cup	—	4–0	2–0	2–0
2	French Guiana	6	3	2	1	8	8	0	11	Advance to Gold Cup prelims	2–0	—	1–1	1–0
3	Dominican Republic	6	2	2	2	8	7	+1	8		1–1	2–3	—	2–0
4	Belize	6	0	1	5	2	10	−8	1		1–2	1–1	0–2	—

Source: CONCACAF
Rules for classification: Tiebreakers
(P) Promoted
2 June 2022
18:00 (19:00 UTC−3) (Note: The French Guiana v Guatemala match, originally scheduled for 2 June 2022, 15:00 EDT (UTC−4) at Stade Municipal Dr. Edmard Lama, Remire-Montjoly, was first rescheduled to 17:00 EDT and later to 18:00 EDT at Stade Georges-Chaumet, Cayenne due to adverse weather conditions that affected the Stade Municipal Dr. Edmard Lama's field.)

French Guiana	2–0	Guatemala
Sarrucco 9'; Némouthé 41'	Report

Stade Georges-Chaumet, Cayenne
Attendance: 1,000
Referee: Damien Rosa (Martinique)
2 June 2022
18:00 (16:00 UTC−6)

Belize	0–2	Dominican Republic
	Report	López 20'; Romero 67'

FFB Stadium, Belmopan
Attendance: 500
Referee: Oliver Vergara (Panama)

5 June 2022
15:00 (13:00 UTC−6)

Guatemala	2–0	Belize
Nembhard 10' (o.g.); Mejía 75' (pen.)	Report

Estadio Doroteo Guamuch Flores, Guatemala City
Attendance: 6,000
Referee: Diego Montaño (Mexico)
5 June 2022
19:00

Dominican Republic	2–3	French Guiana
Romero 20'; López 51'	Report	Sarrucco 16'; Lo. Baal 71'; Abelinti 78'

Estadio Olímpico Félix Sánchez, Santo Domingo
Attendance: 6,000
Referee: Ricardo Montero (Costa Rica)

9 June 2022
18:00 (16:00 UTC−6)

Belize	1–1	French Guiana
Avila 74'	Report	Sarrucco 89'

FFB Stadium, Belmopan
Attendance: 100
Referee: Daniel Quintero (Mexico)
10 June 2022
19:00

Dominican Republic	1–1	Guatemala
Lorenzo 12'	Report	Santis 26'

Estadio Olímpico Félix Sánchez, Santo Domingo
Attendance: 6,000
Referee: Ricardo Montero (Costa Rica)

13 June 2022
20:00 (18:00 UTC−6)

Guatemala	2–0	Dominican Republic
Méndez 32', 78' (pen.)	Report

Estadio Doroteo Guamuch Flores, Guatemala City
Attendance: 8,000
Referee: Adonai Escobedo (Mexico)
14 June 2022
18:00 (19:00 UTC−3) (Note: The French Guiana v Belize match, originally scheduled for 14 June 2022, 15:00 EDT (UTC−4) at Stade Municipal Dr. Edmard Lama, Remire-Montjoly, was rescheduled to 18:00 EDT at Stade Georges-Chaumet, Cayenne.)

French Guiana	1–0	Belize
Sarrucco 80'	Report

Stade Georges-Chaumet, Cayenne
Attendance: 200
Referee: Pierre-Luc Lauzière (Canada)

23 March 2023
17:30 (18:30 UTC−3)

French Guiana	1–1	Dominican Republic
Legrand 86'	Report	Heredia 90+4'

Stade Municipal Dr. Edmard Lama, Remire-Montjoly
Attendance: 800
Referee: Ricangel de Leça (Aruba)
24 March 2023
22:00 (20:00 UTC−6)

Belize	1–2	Guatemala
Polanco 45+1'	Report	Castellanos 30'; Santis 44'

FFB Stadium, Belmopan
Attendance: 3,500
Referee: Selvin Brown (Honduras)

27 March 2023
18:00

Dominican Republic	2–0	Belize
Reyes 13'; Lorenzo 60'	Report

Estadio Panamericano, San Cristóbal
Attendance: 50
Referee: Yadel Martínez (Cuba)
27 March 2023
22:00 (20:00 UTC−6)

Guatemala	4–0	French Guiana
Rubin 60'; Sequen 76'; Samayoa 80'; Aparicio 90+2'	Report

Estadio Doroteo Guamuch Flores, Guatemala City
Attendance: 18,313
Referee: Marco Ortíz (Mexico)

== Statistics ==
=== Goalscorers ===
There were 127 goals scored in 47 matches, for an average of 2.7 goals per match.

5 goals

- (Haiti) Carnejy Antoine

4 goals

- (Cuba) Arichel Hernández
- (French Guiana) Joel Sarrucco
- (Haiti) Mondy Prunier

3 goals

- (Guadeloupe) Thierry Ambrose
- (Guatemala) Rubio Rubin
- (Guyana) Omari Glasgow
- (Haiti) Derrick Etienne
- (Haiti) Frantzdy Pierrot
- (Montserrat) Lyle Taylor
- (Nicaragua) Matías Moldskred
- (Nicaragua) Jaime Moreno
- (Nicaragua) Ariagner Smith

2 goals

- (Antigua and Barbuda) Myles Weston
- (Cuba) Luis Paradela
- (Cuba) Maikel Reyes
- (Dominican Republic) Jean Carlos López
- (Dominican Republic) Nowend Lorenzo
- (Dominican Republic) Dorny Romero
- (Guatemala) Oscar Santis
- (Haiti) Steeven Saba
- (Montserrat) Adrian Clifton
- (Nicaragua) Juan Barrera
- (Nicaragua) Byron Bonilla
- (Saint Vincent and the Grenadines) Kyle Edwards
- (Trinidad and Tobago) Neveal Hackshaw
- (Trinidad and Tobago) Joevin Jones
- (Trinidad and Tobago) Noah Powder

1 goal

- (Antigua and Barbuda) D'Andre Bishop
- (Antigua and Barbuda) Ashley Nathaniel-George
- (Antigua and Barbuda) Shavorn Philip
- (The Bahamas) Marcel Joseph
- (The Bahamas) Lesly St. Fleur
- (Barbados) Keon Atkins
- (Barbados) Thierry Gale
- (Barbados) Tajio James
- (Belize) Horace Avila
- (Belize) Jordy Polanco
- (Bermuda) Jai Bean
- (Bermuda) Willie Clemons
- (Bermuda) Dante Leverock
- (Bermuda) Nahki Wells
- (Cuba) Onel Hernández
- (Cuba) Yasniel Matos
- (Cuba) Willian Pozo-Venta
- (Dominican Republic) Carlos Heredia
- (Dominican Republic) Edarlyn Reyes
- (French Guiana) Arnold Abelinti
- (French Guiana) Loïc Baal
- (French Guiana) Jean-David Legrand
- (French Guiana) Thomas Némouthé
- (Guadeloupe) Grégory Gendrey
- (Guadeloupe) Matthias Phaëton
- (Guatemala) Jorge Aparicio
- (Guatemala) Óscar Castellanos
- (Guatemala) Carlos Mejía
- (Guatemala) Nicolás Samayoa
- (Guatemala) Marlon Sequén
- (Guyana) Trayon Bobb
- (Guyana) Jeremy Garrett
- (Guyana) Liam Gordon
- (Guyana) Nathan Moriah-Welsh
- (Guyana) Emery Welshman
- (Haiti) Alex Christian
- (Haiti) Fredler Christophe
- (Haiti) Dany Jean
- (Haiti) Duckens Nazon
- (Haiti) Jeppe Simonsen
- (Montserrat) Kaleem Simon
- (Nicaragua) Francisco Flores
- (Nicaragua) Josué Quijano
- (Saint Vincent and the Grenadines) Oalex Anderson
- (Saint Vincent and the Grenadines) Azinho Solomon
- (Saint Vincent and the Grenadines) Cornelius Stewart
- (Trinidad and Tobago) Judah García
- (Trinidad and Tobago) Levi García
- (Trinidad and Tobago) Kareem Moses
- (Trinidad and Tobago) John-Paul Rochford
- (Trinidad and Tobago) Ryan Telfer

1 own goal

- (Belize) Deshawon Nembhard (against Guatemala)
- (Nicaragua) Christian Reyes (against Trinidad and Tobago)

=== Best XI ===
CONCACAF announced the following squad as the best eleven of League B after the conclusion of the competition.

Goalkeeper	Defenders	Midfielders	Forwards
(Antigua and Barbuda) Nick Townsend	(Guatemala) Nicolás Samayoa (Dominican Republic) Edarlyn Reyes (Trinidad and Tobago) Alvin Jones	(Haiti) Derrick Etienne (Nicaragua) Matías Moldskred Belli (Barbados) Shaquan Clarke (Trinidad and Tobago) Joevin Jones	(Cuba) Yasniel Matos (Haiti) Frantzdy Pierrot (Nicaragua) Ariagner Smith
