= Dante Leverock =

Bermudan footballer (born 1992)

Personal information
- Full name: Dante Leverock
- Date of birth: 11 April 1992 (age 34)
- Place of birth: Paget, Bermuda
- Height: 1.93 m (6 ft 4 in)
- Position: Centre-back

Team information
- Current team: Dandy Town Hornets F.C.

Senior career*
Years	Team	Apps	(Gls)
2011–2012	Dandy Town Hornets	1	(1)
2011–2012	Bermuda Hogges	2	(0)
2012–2013	Staines Town	1	(1)
2013–2015	Leatherhead	1	(1)
2015–2016	Harrisburg City Islanders	41	(4)
2017–2018	Ilkeston	19	(0)
2018–2019	Narva Trans	34	(8)
2019–2020	Sligo Rovers	22	(4)
2020	Radomiak Radom	0	(0)
2021–	Robin Hood	2	(1)

International career^{‡}
- Bermuda U17
2010–2011	Bermuda U20	5	(2)
2015–	Bermuda	34	(7)
- * Club domestic league appearances and goals as of 07:18, 31 March 2021 (UTC) ‡ National team caps and goals as of 18 March 2023

Dante Leverock (born 11 April 1992) is a Bermudian professional footballer who plays as a centre-back for Dandy Town Hornets F.C. and the Bermuda national team.

== Club career ==
Leverock played for local side Dandy Town Hornets before joining the Bermuda Hogges in the USL Second Division in summer 2011. In August 2012, Leverock got himself a scholarship at St Mary's University in London, leaving Dandy Town Hornets again for English side Staines Town in the process. After picking up an injury, he moved to Leatherhead in 2013.

In winter 2014–15, Leverock trained with Baltimore Blast before joining Harrisburg City Islanders for the 2015 season.

In 2018, Leverock signed with JK Narva Trans, a professional football club in Estonia, that competes in the highest division of Estonian football. During his first month, Leverock was named by Premium Liiga Soccernet.ee as part of the best eleven players for the month of March.

In December 2018, Leverock signed for Sligo Rovers and was a member of the first team squad for the 2019 season. After one season with Rovers, it was announced that Leverock has left the club.

After one season in Ireland, Leverock signed for Polish second division side Radomiak Radom in February 2020. He left Radomiak at the end of the 2019–20 season without making any appearances for the club. In September 2020, he returned to Bermuda to sign with Robin Hood.

== International career ==
Leverock received his first international cap for Bermuda on 8 March 2015 in a friendly match against Grenada and has, as of June 2019, earned a total of twenty caps, scoring three goals. He has represented his country in four FIFA World Cup qualification matches. On 18 May 2021, Leverock announced he was retiring from international football. However, four weeks later, he reversed his decision and was named to the Bermudan provisional squad for 2021 CONCACAF Gold Cup qualification.

== Personal life ==
He is a cousin of former MLS player Khano Smith.

== Career statistics ==
Scores and results list Bermuda's goal tally first.

No.	Date	Venue	Opponent	Score	Result	Competition
1.	25 March 2015	Thomas Robinson Stadium, Nassau, Bahamas	Bahamas	1–0	5–0	2018 FIFA World Cup qualification
2.	12 October 2018	Bermuda National Stadium, Hamilton, Bermuda	Sint Maarten	10–0	12–0	2019–20 CONCACAF Nations League qualification
3.	16 June 2019	Estadio Nacional de Costa Rica, San José, Costa Rica	Haiti	1–0	1–2	2019 CONCACAF Gold Cup
4.	19 November 2019	Estadio Nemesio Díez, Toluca, Mexico	Mexico	1–0	1–2	2019–20 CONCACAF Nations League A
5.	30 March 2021	IMG Academy, Bradenton, United States	Aruba	3–0	5–0	2022 FIFA World Cup qualification
6.	2 July 2021	DRV PNK Stadium, Fort Lauderdale, United States	Barbados	4–0	8–1	2021 CONCACAF Gold Cup qualification
7.	7 June 2022	National Track and Field Facility, Leonora, Guyana	Guyana	1–1	2–1	2022–23 CONCACAF Nations League B
