= Ricardo Brangman =

Bermudian cricketer (born 1980)

Personal information
- Full name: Ricardo Brangman
- Born: 25 August 1980 (age 46); Bermuda
- Batting: Right-handed
- Role: Wicket-keeper

Domestic team information
- Years: Team
- 2007/08: Bermuda

Career statistics
Competition	Twenty20
Matches	1
Runs scored	0
Batting average	0.00
100s/50s	–/–
Top score	0
Balls bowled	–
Wickets	–
Bowling average	–
5 wickets in innings	–
10 wickets in match	–
Best bowling	–
Catches/stumpings	1/–
- Source: Cricinfo, 1 April 2013

Richardo Brangman (born 25 August 1980) is a Bermudian cricketer. Brangman is a right-handed batsman who plays as a wicket-keeper.

In January 2008, Bermuda were again invited to part in the 2008 Stanford 20/20, where Brangman made a single Twenty20 appearance against Guyana in the first round. Bermuda made 62/9 from their twenty overs, during which Brangman was dismissed for a duck by Lennox Cush. In Guyana's successful chase, Brangman took a single catch from behind the stumps, catching Travis Dowlin for 4 runs off the bowling of Traddie Simpson.

Brangman also plays football for Devonshire Cougars, playing as a goalkeeper.
