= Calon Minors =

Bermudian footballer

Personal information
- Full name: Calon Minors
- Date of birth: 11 July 1996 (age 30)
- Height: 1.73 m (5 ft 8 in)
- Position: Left back

Team information
- Current team: BAA Wanderers

College career
Years	Team	Apps	(Gls)
2014–2017	USC Upstate Spartans	51	(2)

Senior career*
Years	Team	Apps	(Gls)
2017–2018	BAA Wanderers		
2018	Soccer Management Institute		
2018–	BAA Wanderers		

International career^{‡}
2017–	Bermuda	14	(0)
- * Club domestic league appearances and goals as of 09:44, 13 October 2020 (UTC) ‡ National team caps and goals as of 10:34, 7 July 2021 (UTC)

Calon Minors (born 11 July 1996) is a Bermudian international footballer who plays for BAA Wanderers, as a left back.

== Career ==
Minors played college soccer for the USC Upstate Spartans between 2014 and 2017. He has played club football for BAA Wanderers.

In August 2018 he began playing for the Soccer Management Institute in Italy.

He made his international debut for Bermuda in 2017.
