= Duckens Nazon =

Haitian footballer (born 1994)

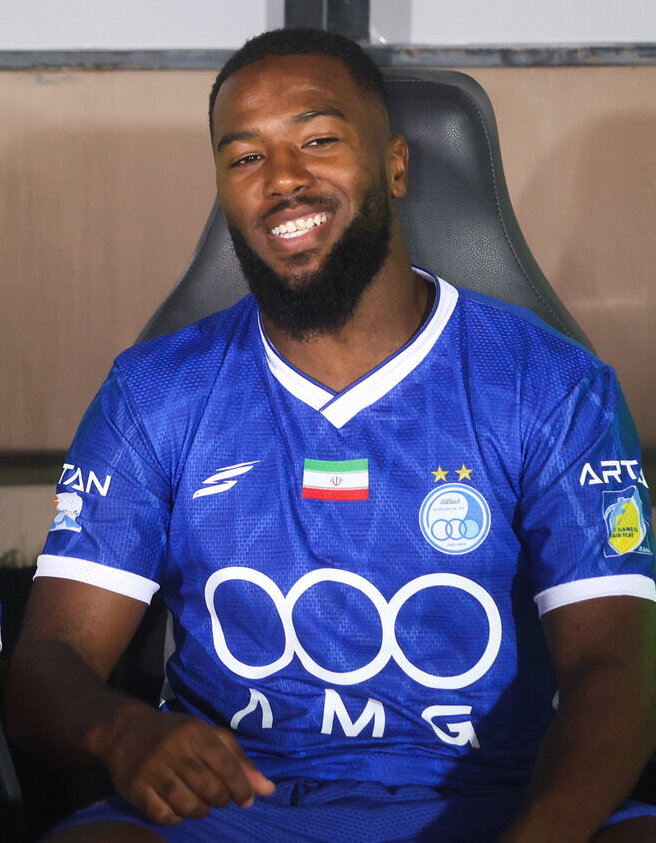
- Nazon with Esteghlal in 2025

Personal information
- Full name: Duckens Moïse Nazon
- Date of birth: 7 April 1994 (age 32)
- Place of birth: Châtenay-Malabry, France
- Height: 1.81 m (5 ft 11 in)
- Position: Striker

Team information
- Current team: Al-Nasr (LBY)

Youth career
- 2011–2012: Vannes
- 2012–2013: Lorient

Senior career*
Years	Team	Apps	(Gls)
2013–2014	Lorient II	0	(0)
2014–2015	Olympique Saint-Quentin	13	(10)
2015–2016	Laval	14	(3)
2016–2017	Kerala Blasters	7	(2)
2017–2018	Wolverhampton Wanderers	0	(0)
2017	→ Coventry City (loan)	21	(6)
2018	→ Oldham Athletic (loan)	16	(6)
2018–2021	Sint-Truiden	28	(6)
2019	→ St.Mirren (loan)	10	(2)
2021–2022	Quevilly-Rouen	38	(15)
2022–2024	CSKA Sofia	50	(27)
2024–2025	Kayserispor	46	(11)
2025–2026	Esteghlal	10	(1)
2026–	Al-Nasr (LBY)		

International career^{‡}
2013	Haiti U20	2	(0)
2014–	Haiti	83	(44)
- * Club domestic league appearances and goals ‡ National team caps and goals as of 23:38, 24 June 2026 (UTC)

Duckens Moïse Nazon (born 7 April 1994) is a professional footballer who plays as a striker for Libyan Premier League club Al-Nasr Benghazi and the Haiti national team. With 44 goals, he is Haiti's all-time top scorer.

Nazon was a member of the Haiti squad for five CONCACAF Gold Cups, the Copa América Centenario, and the 2026 FIFA World Cup.

== Early life ==
Nazon was born in Châtenay-Malabry, in the southern suburbs of Paris, to Haitian parents. He acquired French nationality on 15 October 1996, through the collective effect of his mother's naturalization.

== Club career ==
After going through the youth system at Vannes, Nazon joined Lorient's reserve team in 2013. Later that year, he joined French fourth-tier side US Roye.

After brief stints at Olympique Saint-Quentin and Stade Lavallois, he joined Kerala Blasters in the Indian Super League in September 2016.

Three months later, on 13 January 2017, he signed a six-month deal with English Championship side Wolverhampton Wanderers, becoming part of their under-23 team. On 4 August 2017, he went out on loan to League Two side Coventry City until January 2018. He made his English league debut for the club the following day as a substitute in a 3–0 win against Notts County. On 8 August 2017 he scored his first goal in English football, scoring in the Sky Blues' 3–1 League Cup defeat to Blackburn. He scored 8 goals in 24 appearances in all competitions in his six-month loan spell. The club later gained promotion to League One via the play-offs.

Nazon was then loaned out to League One side Oldham Athletic until the end of the season. He scored six goals in 16 appearances for the club as they saw relegation to League Two.

On 14 June 2018, Nazon joined Belgian First Division A club Sint-Truiden on a three-year deal for an undisclosed fee.

In January 2019, Nazon joined Scottish Premiership side St Mirren on loan until the end of the season.

On 26 July 2021, Nazon joined Ligue 2 side Quevilly-Rouen on a free transfer.

== International career ==
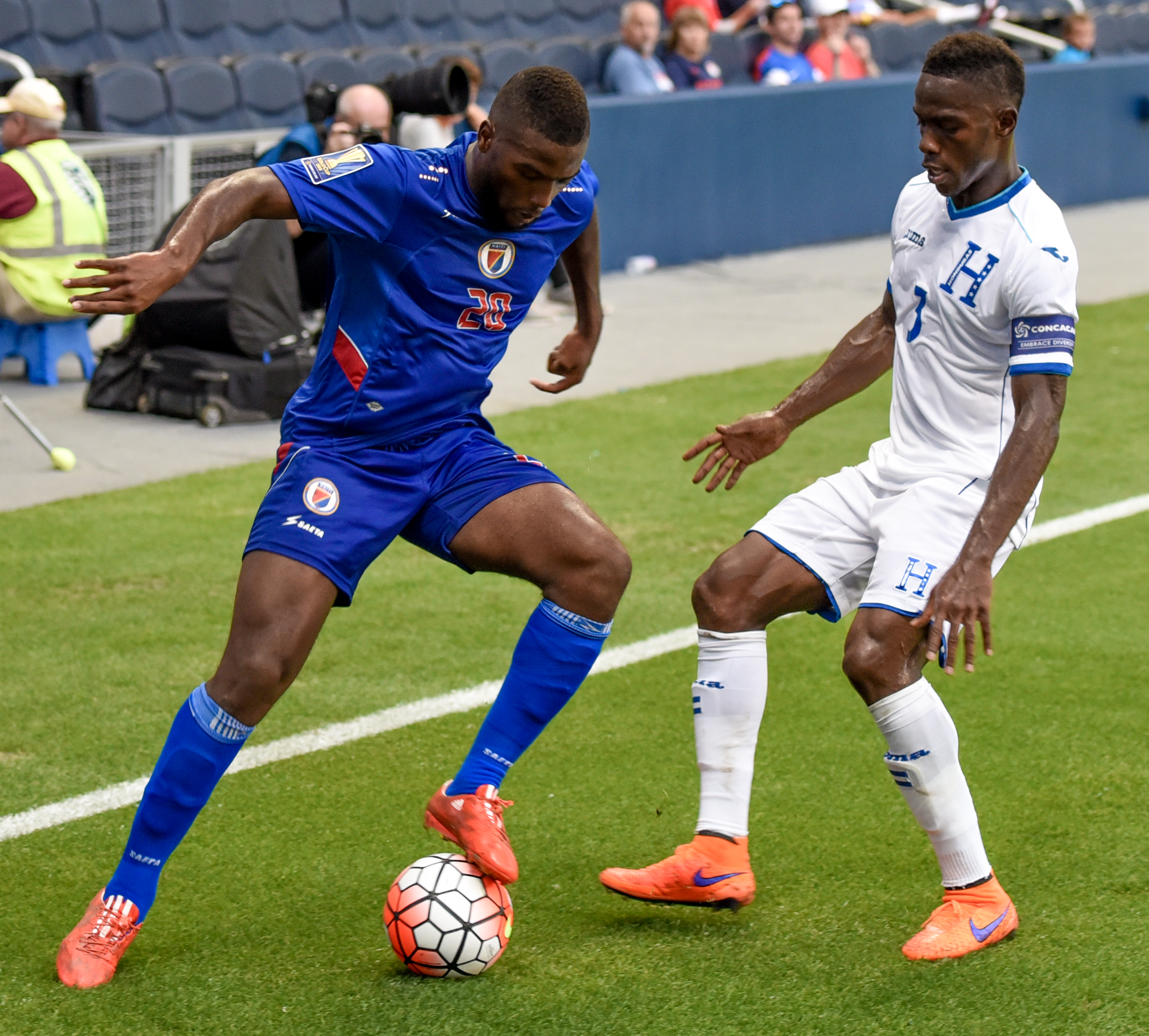
Nazon against Honduras' Maynor Figueroa at the 2015 CONCACAF Gold Cup

Nazon earned his first cap for the Haiti national team on 5 March 2014 against Kosovo (draw 0–0).

In the 2015 Gold Cup, Nazon scored the only two goals for Haiti in the group stage, helping his team get second place and advancing to the knockout stage.

On 10 September 2018, in a competitive game against Sint Maarten, he scored five goals, a record for Haiti. On 9 September 2025, he scored three goals in the second half of a game against Costa Rica, earning a point in the second match of the last round of qualifiers to the 2026 World Cup. He made his World Cup debut as a substitute in the third group-stage match against Morocco.

== Career statistics ==
=== Club ===
As of match played 17 February 2026

Appearances and goals by club, season and competition
Club	Season	League			National cup		League cup		Other		Total	
Club	Season	Division	Apps	Goals	Apps	Goals	Apps	Goals	Apps	Goals	Apps	Goals
Lorient II	2012–13	CFA	8	1	–		–		0	0	8	1
Roye-Noyon	2013–14	CFA	16	0	0	0	–		0	0	16	0
Olympique Saint-Quentin	2013–14	CFA2	13	10	0	0	–		0	0	13	10
Laval II	2014–15	CFA2	7	7	–		–		0	0	7	7
Laval II	2015–16	CFA2	10	5	–		–		0	0	10	5
Laval II	Total		17	12	~	~	~	~	0	0	17	12
Laval	2015–16	Ligue 2	14	3	2	3	3	0	0	0	19	6
Kerala Blasters	2016	Indian Super League	7	2	0	0	0	0	0	0	7	2
Wolverhampton Wanderers	2016–17	Championship	0	0	0	0	0	0	0	0	0	0
Coventry City (loan)	2017–18	League Two	21	6	2	1	1	1	0	0	24	8
Oldham Athletic (loan)	2017–18	League One	16	6	0	0	0	0	0	0	16	6
Sint-Truiden	2018–19	Belgian First Division A	5	0	1	0	0	0	0	0	6	0
Sint-Truiden	2019–20	Belgian First Division A	1	0	0	0	0	0	0	0	1	0
Sint-Truiden	2020–21	Belgian First Division A	22	6	2	1	0	0	0	0	24	7
Sint-Truiden	Total		28	6	3	1	0	0	0	0	31	7
St Mirren (loan)	2018–19	Scottish Premiership	10	1	1	1	0	0	1 (Note: One appearance in the Scottish Premiership play-offs)	0	12	2
Quevilly-Rouen	2021–22	Ligue 2	32	11	4	4	0	0	0	0	36	15
CSKA Sofia	2022–23	First League	32	18	3	1	0	0	5 (Note: Three appearances in the UEFA Conference League)	1	40	19
CSKA Sofia	2023–24	First League	18	7	2	0	0	0	2 (Note: Two appearances in the UEFA Conference League)	0	22	7
CSKA Sofia	Total		50	25	5	1	0	0	7	1	62	27
Kayserispor	2023–24	Süper Lig	13	2	0	0	0	0	0	0	13	2
Kayserispor	2024–25	Süper Lig	33	9	0	0	0	0	0	0	33	9
Kayserispor	Total		46	11	0	0	0	0	0	0	46	11
Esteghlal	2025–26	Persian Gulf Pro League	10	1	1	0	–		8	1	19	2
Career total			288	95	18	11	4	1	16	2	326	109

=== International ===
As of match played 24 June 2026

Appearances and goals by national team and year
National team	Year	Apps	Goals
Haiti	2014	3	0
Haiti	2015	10	4
Haiti	2016	7	4
Haiti	2017	4	2
Haiti	2018	4	5
Haiti	2019	14	4
Haiti	2020	0	0
Haiti	2021	8	7
Haiti	2022	0	0
Haiti	2023	7	2
Haiti	2024	9	11
Haiti	2025	12	5
Haiti	2026	5	0
Total		83	44

Scores and results list Haiti's goal tally first, score column indicates score after each Nazon goal.

List of international goals scored by Duckens Nazon
No.	Date	Venue	Opponent	Score	Result	Competition
1	7 July 2015	Toyota Stadium, Frisco, United States	Panama	1–1	1–1	2015 CONCACAF Gold Cup
2	13 July 2015	Sporting Park, Kansas City, United States	Honduras	1–0	1–0	2015 CONCACAF Gold Cup
3	4 September 2015	National Cricket Stadium, St. George's, Grenada	Grenada	3–1	3–1	2018 FIFA World Cup qualification
4	8 September 2015	Stade Sylvio Cator, Port-au-Prince, Haiti	Grenada	2–0	3–0	2018 FIFA World Cup qualification
5	6 September 2016	Independence Park, Kingston, Jamaica	Jamaica	2–0	2–0	2018 FIFA World Cup qualification
6	9 November 2016	Stade Sylvio Cator, Port-au-Prince, Haiti	French Guiana	2–0	2–5	2017 Caribbean Cup qualification
7	13 November 2016	Warner Park Sporting Complex, Basseterre, Saint Kitts and Nevis	Saint Kitts and Nevis	1–0	2–0	2017 Caribbean Cup qualification
8	13 November 2016	Warner Park Sporting Complex, Basseterre, Saint Kitts and Nevis	Saint Kitts and Nevis	2–0	2–0	2017 Caribbean Cup qualification
9	10 October 2017	International Stadium Yokohama, Yokohama, Japan	Japan	2–2	3–3	2017 Kirin Challenge Cup
10	10 October 2017	International Stadium Yokohama, Yokohama, Japan	Japan	3–2	3–3	2017 Kirin Challenge Cup
11	10 September 2018	Stade Sylvio Cator, Port-au-Prince, Haiti	Sint Maarten	2–0	13–0	2019–20 CONCACAF Nations League qualification
12	10 September 2018	Stade Sylvio Cator, Port-au-Prince, Haiti	Sint Maarten	4–0	13–0	2019–20 CONCACAF Nations League qualification
13	10 September 2018	Stade Sylvio Cator, Port-au-Prince, Haiti	Sint Maarten	5–0	13–0	2019–20 CONCACAF Nations League qualification
14	10 September 2018	Stade Sylvio Cator, Port-au-Prince, Haiti	Sint Maarten	7–0	13–0	2019–20 CONCACAF Nations League qualification
15	10 September 2018	Stade Sylvio Cator, Port-au-Prince, Haiti	Sint Maarten	8–0	13–0	2019–20 CONCACAF Nations League qualification
16	24 March 2019	Stade Sylvio Cator, Port-au-Prince, Haiti	Cuba	1–0	2–1	2019–20 CONCACAF Nations League qualification
17	24 June 2019	Red Bull Arena, Harrison, United States	Costa Rica	1–1	2–1	2019 CONCACAF Gold Cup
18	29 June 2019	NRG Stadium, Houston, United States	Canada	1–2	3–2	2019 CONCACAF Gold Cup
19	17 November 2019	Estadio Ricardo Saprissa Aymá, San José, Costa Rica	Costa Rica	1–1	1–1	2019–20 CONCACAF Nations League A
20	5 June 2021	TCIFA National Academy, Providenciales, Turks and Caicos Islands	Turks and Caicos Islands	1–0	10–0	2022 FIFA World Cup qualification
21	5 June 2021	TCIFA National Academy, Providenciales, Turks and Caicos Islands	Turks and Caicos Islands	2–0	10–0	2022 FIFA World Cup qualification
22	5 June 2021	TCIFA National Academy, Providenciales, Turks and Caicos Islands	Turks and Caicos Islands	3–0	10–0	2022 FIFA World Cup qualification
23	5 June 2021	TCIFA National Academy, Providenciales, Turks and Caicos Islands	Turks and Caicos Islands	4–0	10–0	2022 FIFA World Cup qualification
24	2 July 2021	DRV PNK Stadium, Fort Lauderdale, United States	Saint Vincent and the Grenadines	1–0	6–1	2021 CONCACAF Gold Cup qualification
25	2 July 2021	DRV PNK Stadium, Fort Lauderdale, United States	Saint Vincent and the Grenadines	4–1	6–1	2021 CONCACAF Gold Cup qualification
26	6 July 2021	DRV PNK Stadium, Fort Lauderdale, United States	Bermuda	4–1	4–1	2021 CONCACAF Gold Cup qualification
27	25 March 2023	Blakes Estate Stadium, Lookout, Montserrat	Montserrat	1–0	4–0	2022–23 CONCACAF Nations League B
28	25 June 2023	NRG Stadium, Houston, United States	Qatar	1–1	2–1	2023 CONCACAF Gold Cup
29	23 March 2024	Stade Municipal Dr. Edmard Lama, Remire-Montjoly, French Guiana	French Guiana	1–0	1–1	Friendly
30	6 June 2024	Wildey Turf, Wildey, Barbados	Saint Lucia	2–1	2–1	2026 FIFA World Cup qualification
31	6 September 2024	Mayagüez Athletics Stadium, Mayagüez, Puerto Rico	Puerto Rico	4–1	4–1	2024–25 CONCACAF Nations League B
32	9 September 2024	Mayagüez Athletics Stadium, Mayagüez, Puerto Rico	Sint Maarten	2–0	6–0	2024–25 CONCACAF Nations League B
33	9 September 2024	Mayagüez Athletics Stadium, Mayagüez, Puerto Rico	Sint Maarten	3–0	6–0	2024–25 CONCACAF Nations League B
34	9 September 2024	Mayagüez Athletics Stadium, Mayagüez, Puerto Rico	Sint Maarten	5–0	6–0	2024–25 CONCACAF Nations League B
35	11 October 2024	Trinidad Stadium, Oranjestad, Aruba	Aruba	2–1	3–1	2024–25 CONCACAF Nations League B
36	11 October 2024	Trinidad Stadium, Oranjestad, Aruba	Aruba	3–1	3–1	2024–25 CONCACAF Nations League B
37	14 October 2024	Trinidad Stadium, Oranjestad, Aruba	Aruba	3–2	5–3	2024–25 CONCACAF Nations League B
38	15 November 2024	Mayagüez Athletics Stadium, Mayagüez, Puerto Rico	Sint Maarten	5–0	8–0	2024–25 CONCACAF Nations League B
39	15 November 2024	Mayagüez Athletics Stadium, Mayagüez, Puerto Rico	Sint Maarten	7–0	8–0	2024–25 CONCACAF Nations League B
40	7 June 2025	Trinidad Stadium, Oranjestad, Aruba	Aruba	4–0	5–0	2026 FIFA World Cup qualification
41	9 September 2025	Estadio Nacional, San José, Costa Rica	Costa Rica	1–2	3–3	2026 FIFA World Cup qualification
42	9 September 2025	Estadio Nacional, San José, Costa Rica	Costa Rica	2–2	3–3	2026 FIFA World Cup qualification
43	9 September 2025	Estadio Nacional, San José, Costa Rica	Costa Rica	3–2	3–3	2026 FIFA World Cup qualification
44	9 October 2025	Nicaragua National Football Stadium, Managua, Nicaragua	Nicaragua	1–0	3–0	2026 FIFA World Cup qualification

== See also ==
- List of top international men's football goal scorers by country
