= Oliver Harvey (footballer) =

Bermudian footballer

Personal information
- Full name: Oliver Jalen Harvey
- Date of birth: 28 August 1993 (age 33)
- Place of birth: Hamilton, Bermuda
- Height: 1.77 m (5 ft 10 in)
- Position: Defender

Senior career*
Years	Team	Apps	(Gls)
2010	BAA Wanderers		
2011	Bermuda Hogges		
2012–2015	DePaul Blue Demons	63	(10)

International career^{‡}
2013–	Bermuda	15	(1)
Medal record
Men's football
Representing Bermuda
Island Games
Winner	2013 Bermudas
- * Club domestic league appearances and goals ‡ National team caps and goals as of 24 June 2019

Oliver Jalen Harvey (born 28 August 1993) is a Bermudian football player.

== International ==
He made his Bermuda national football team debut on 14 July 2013 in an Island Games match against Greenland.

He was selected for the 2019 CONCACAF Gold Cup squad.

== Honours ==
Bermuda

- Island Games: 2013
