= Carlos Heredia (footballer) =

Dominican Republic footballer (b. 1998)

Personal information
- Full name: Carlos Heredia Fontana
- Date of birth: 28 September 1998 (age 28)
- Place of birth: Barcelona, Spain
- Height: 1.72 m (5 ft 8 in)
- Position: Winger

Team information
- Current team: Cibao
- Number: 26

Youth career
- 2009–2016: CE Europa
- 2016–2017: Milton Keynes Dons

Senior career*
Years	Team	Apps	(Gls)
2017–2019	Wolverhampton Wanderers	0	(0)
2019–2020	Miedź Legnica	9	(0)
2019–2020	Miedź Legnica II	8	(1)
2021	Delfines del Este	13	(1)
2021–2024	Cibao	76	(4)

International career^{‡}
2018–	Dominican Republic	15	(2)
- * Club domestic league appearances and goals as of 19:01, 28 September 2024 (UTC) ‡ National team caps and goals as of 19:01, 28 September 2024 (UTC)

Carlos Heredia Fontana (born 28 September 1998) is a professional footballer who plays as a winger for Liga DF club Cibao. Born in Spain, he plays for the Dominican Republic national team.

== Career ==
Heredia joined Wolverhampton Wanderers in 2017 from English club Milton Keynes Dons. He was released at the end of the 2018–19 season.

Following his release from the Premier League side, Heredia signed a contract with Miedź Legnica lasting until 2023. He made his professional debut for the club in a 1–0 defeat to Stal Mielec, replacing Krzysztof Danielewicz.

== International career ==
On 9 September 2018, Heredia made his debut for Dominican Republic in the qualifying rounds of the CONCACAF Nations League against Bonaire in a 5–0 victory, scoring the fifth goal.

=== International goals ===
Scores and results list Dominican Republic's goal tally first.

No.	Date	Venue	Opponent	Score	Result	Competition
1.	9 September 2018	Ergilio Hato Stadium, Willemstad, Curaçao	Bonaire	5–0	5–0	2019–20 CONCACAF Nations League qualification
2.	23 March 2023	Stade Municipal Dr. Edmard Lama, Remire-Montjoly, French Guiana	French Guiana	1–1	1–1	2022–23 CONCACAF Nations League B
