= Timothy Figureido =

Bermudian footballer (born 1973)

Timmy Figureido
Personal information
- Full name: Timothy Figureido
- Date of birth: January 9, 1973 (age 53)
- Place of birth: Paget, Bermuda
- Height: 6 ft 0 in (1.83 m)
- Position: Goalkeeper

Team information
- Current team: Robin Hood
- Number: 1

Youth career
- 1981–1991: Vasco Da Gama

Senior career*
Years	Team	Apps	(Gls)
2005–2007	Somerset Trojans	86	(1)
2007–2009	Bermuda Hogges	30	(0)
2011–2013	Bermuda Hogges	1	(0)
2011	Robin Hood		

International career^{‡}
1999–2008	Bermuda	22	(0)
- * Club domestic league appearances and goals as of June 1, 2011 ‡ National team caps and goals as of June 1, 2011

Timothy Figureido (born January 9, 1973) is a Bermudian footballer, who currently plays for Robin Hood.

== Club career ==
Figureido began his career with Somerset Trojans, and played for the team for three years in the Bermudian Premier Division.

Figureido has been part of the Bermuda Hogges squad in the USL Second Division since the team's inaugural season in 2007, and has been the first choice goalkeeper throughout his three seasons with the team. He returned for a second spell at the club in 2011.

He has been playing and goalkeeper coaching at Robin Hood since 2011.

== International career ==
Figureido represented Bermuda at the 1995 Pan American Games. He made his full debut for Bermuda in a January 1999 friendly match against Antigua and Barbuda and earned a total of 22 caps, scoring no goals. He has represented his country in 6 FIFA World Cup qualification matches. He played in both of Bermuda's qualifying games for the 2006 FIFA World Cup, and in all four of Bermuda's qualifying games for the 2010 FIFA World Cup, including their 3–1 victory over the Cayman Islands on March 30, 2008, and their historic 2–1 victory over Trinidad and Tobago on June 15, 2008.

His final international match was an August 2008 CONCACAF Gold Cup qualification match against the Cayman Islands.
