= Jaylon Bather =

Bermudian association football player

Personal information
- Full name: Jaylon Bather
- Date of birth: 31 December 1992 (age 33)
- Place of birth: Southampton Parish, Bermuda
- Position: Center-back

Team information
- Current team: PHC Zebras

College career
Years	Team	Apps	(Gls)
2011–2012	Darton State Cavaliers	36	(4)

Senior career*
Years	Team	Apps	(Gls)
2010–2012	Bermuda Hogges	30	(0)
2013–2014	BAA Wanderers		
2014–2016	Robin Hood		
2016–2017	Ilkeston		
2017–2022	Robin Hood		
2022–	PHC Zebras		

International career^{‡}
2015–	Bermuda	34	(2)
- * Club domestic league appearances and goals ‡ National team caps and goals as of 12:27, 29 January 2023 (UTC)

Jaylon Bather (born 31 December 1992) is a Bermudian footballer who plays for PHC Zebras and the Bermuda national football team.

== Career ==
=== College ===
Bather attended Darton State College in 2011 and 2012, helping the team to a regional championship in the latter season.

=== Club ===
In his youth, Bather played for several programs in his native Bermuda. After starting out in the BYSP, he joined PHC Zebras, before leaving the club at the age of 12. In 2016, he moved abroad, joining English club Ilkeston in an effort to secure more time in the professional game. He would return to Bermuda following the 2016/17 season. In 2022, Bather returned to PHC Zebras, stating that he wished to give back to the club with which he started his career.

=== International ===
Bather made his senior international debut in March 2015, appearing in a 2–0 friendly victory over Grenada. Bather was a member of Bermuda's 2019 CONCACAF Gold Cup roster, and was a key member of the team that reached League A in the 2019–20 CONCACAF Nations League.

== Career statistics ==
=== International ===
As of matches played 6 July 2021

National team	Year	Apps	Goals
Bermuda	2015	6	0
Bermuda	2016	3	0
Bermuda	2017	1	1
Bermuda	2018	5	0
Bermuda	2019	12	0
Bermuda	2020	1	0
Bermuda	2021	6	1
Total		34	2

==== International Goals ====
Scores and results list Bermuda's goal tally first.

Goal	Date	Venue	Opponent	Score	Result	Competition
1.	28 October 2017	Bermuda National Stadium, Devonshire Parish, Bermuda	Barbados	2–0	2–3	Friendly
2.	30 March 2021	IMG Academy, Bradenton, Florida, United States	Aruba	2–0	5–0	2022 FIFA World Cup qualification
