= Lejaun Simmons =

Footballer (born 1993)

Personal information
- Full name: Lejaun Perry Simmons
- Date of birth: 7 April 1993 (age 33)
- Place of birth: Hamilton, Bermuda
- Height: 5 ft 8 in (1.73 m)
- Position: Striker

Team information
- Current team: Robin Hood

Youth career
- 2009–2011: Devonshire Cougars

Senior career*
Years	Team	Apps	(Gls)
2011–2013	Devonshire Cougars		
2013–2015	Ilkeston	6	(0)
2014	→ Mickleover Sports (loan)		
2014	→ Long Eaton United (loan)		
2015–	Robin Hood		

International career^{‡}
2012–	Bermuda	31	(8)
Medal record
Men's football
Representing Bermuda
Island Games
Winner	2013 Bermudas
- * Club domestic league appearances and goals as of 18 October 2018 ‡ National team caps and goals as of 18 March 2023

Lejaun Perry Simmons (born 7 April 1993) is a footballer who plays as a striker for Robin Hood and the Bermuda national team.

== Club career ==
Lejaun Simmons started his career at major Bermudian side Devonshire Cougars, being in the youth team for 2 years before being promoted to the first team in 2011. In 2013 he began training with Ilkeston, after the English club developed a link-up with Bermuda Hogges in order to create a pathway to professional football for promising Bermudian players. During the 2013–14 season he made seven appearances for the club (six in the league), and also had loan spells with Mickleover Sports and Long Eaton United.

He was still with the club in December 2014, however he did not make any appearances during the 2014–15 season. He had left the club by December 2015, returning to Bermuda with Robin Hood. He signed a three-year contract in August 2017.

== International career ==
Lejaun made his debut for the Bermuda national team against Haiti on 9 September 2012, in the CONCACAF Gold Cup. He scored his first goal two days later against Saint Martin in the same competition.

== Career statistics ==
Scores and results list Bermuda's goal tally first.

No	Date	Venue	Opponent	Score	Result	Competition
1.	11 September 2012	Stade Sylvio Cator, Port-au-Prince, Haiti	Saint Martin	8–0	8–0	2012 Caribbean Cup qualification
2.	17 July 2013	Bermuda National Stadium, Hamilton, Bermuda	Frøya	1–0	8–0	2013 Island Games
3.	17 July 2013	Bermuda National Stadium, Hamilton, Bermuda	Frøya	6–0	8–0	2013 Island Games
4.	17 July 2013	Bermuda National Stadium, Hamilton, Bermuda	Frøya	7–0	8–0	2013 Island Games
5.	22 January 2017	Bermuda National Stadium, Hamilton, Bermuda	Canada	2–2	2–4	Friendly
6.	12 October 2018	Bermuda National Stadium, Hamilton, Bermuda	Sint Maarten	2–0	12–0	2019–20 CONCACAF Nations League qualification
7.	25 February 2019	Estadio Pedro Marrero, Havana, Cuba	Cuba	?–?	2–2	Friendly
8.	24 June 2019	Red Bull Arena, Harrison, United States	Nicaragua	1–0	2–0	2019 CONCACAF Gold Cup

== Honours ==
Bermuda

- Island Games: 2013
