= Matías Moldskred Belli =

Nicaraguan footballer (born 1997)

Personal information
- Full name: Matías Moldskred Belli
- Date of birth: 12 August 1997 (age 29)
- Place of birth: Madrid, Spain
- Height: 1.88 m (6 ft 2 in)
- Position: Midfielder

Team information
- Current team: Dong A Thanh Hoa
- Number: 27

Youth career
- –2013: Ullern
- 2014–2015: Asker
- 2016: Bærum

Senior career*
Years	Team	Apps	(Gls)
2015	Asker	1	(0)
2017	Ready	25	(12)
2018–2020	Raufoss	82	(17)
2021–2022	Start	22	(3)
2022	Mjøndalen	21	(1)
2022–2024	Sandnes Ulf	51	(10)
2025	Voluntari	4	(0)
2025	Real Estelí	10	(1)
2026–	Dong A Thanh Hoa	7	(0)

International career^{‡}
2021–	Nicaragua	33	(7)
- * Club domestic league appearances and goals as of 7 June 2026 ‡ National team caps and goals as of 10 June 2025

Matías Moldskred Belli (born 12 August 1997) is a professional footballer who plays as a midfielder for V.League 1 club Dong A Thanh Hoa. Born in Spain and raised in Norway, he plays for the Nicaragua national team.

== Early life ==
Moldskred was born on 12 August 1997 in Madrid, Spain, to a Norwegian father and a Nicaraguan mother. In addition to the Norwegian language, he also speaks Spanish.

Moldskred lived in Belgium for three years before moving to Bærum in 2005.

Moldskred is the nephew of the poet Gioconda Belli, sister of his mother Lavinia.

== Club career ==
Raised in the Ullern youth academies, Moldskred later joined the Asker youth academies. He made his first team debut on 17 October 2015, replacing Stian Solberg in a 0–8 win at Grue. The following year he moved to Bærum, but he didn't play any team games.

In view of the 2017 championship, Moldskred has been registered by IF Ready. On 19 April, he played his first match in 3. divisjon, in a 5–1 victory over Raufoss 2. On 29 April he scored the first goal, in a 4–2 win over Redalen.

On 9 January 2018, Raufoss announced the signing of Moldskred, who has joined the new club with a two-year contract. On 14 April 2018 he made his debut in 2. divisjon, used as a starter in the 4–0 win over Elverum. On 22 April he scored his first goals in the league, scoring a brace in the 0–5 victory at Nybergsund. At the end of that same season, Raufoss was promoted to 1. divisjon.

On 31 March 2019, Moldskred therefore played his first match in the Norwegian second division, when he was deployed in the 1–2 win at Nest-Sotra, in which he scored a goal.

On 19 January 2021, Moldskred's move to the Start was announced, for which he signed a three-year agreement.

== International career ==
On 13 March 2021, Moldskred received the first call-up from Nicaragua's coach Juan Vita of Argentina in view of the 2022 World Cup qualifying matches to be played on March 24 and 27, respectively against St. Lucia and Turks and Caicos Islands.

St. Lucia had withdrawn from the World Cup qualifying, so Moldskred then made his debut on 27 March, taking over from Danilo Zúñiga and scoring a goal in the 0–7 victory over Turks and Caicos Islands.

According to Vita, Moldskred is a «midfielder with attacking characteristics and with a very good proactive ability. He has a good shot from mid-range, he is good in the air and from a tactical point of view».

== Career statistics ==
=== International ===
As of match played 10 June 2025

Appearances and goals by national team and year
National team	Year	Apps	Goals
Nicaragua	2021	3	1
Nicaragua	2022	10	3
Nicaragua	2023	9	3
Nicaragua	2024	7	0
Nicaragua	2025	4	0
Total		33	7

Scores and results list Nicaragua's goal tally first, score column indicates score after each Moldskred goal.

List of international goals scored by Matías Moldskred Belli
No.	Date	Venue	Opponent	Score	Result	Competition	Ref.
1	27 March 2021	Estadio Panamericano, San Cristóbal, Dominican Republic	Turks and Caicos Islands	7–0	7–0	2022 FIFA World Cup qualification	
2	29 January 2022	Estadio Nacional, Managua, Nicaragua	Belize	3–0	4–0	Friendly	
3	6 June 2022	Arnos Vale Stadium, Arnos Vale, Saint Vincent and the Grenadines	Saint Vincent and the Grenadines	2–1	2–2	2022–23 CONCACAF Nations League B	
4	10 June 2022	Thomas Robinson Stadium, Nassau, Bahamas	Bahamas	2–0	2–0	2022–23 CONCACAF Nations League B	
5	24 March 2023	Estadio Nacional, Managua, Nicaragua	Saint Vincent and the Grenadines	3–1	4–1	2022–23 CONCACAF Nations League B	
6	8 September 2023	Estadio Olímpico Félix Sánchez, Santo Domingo, Dominican Republic	Dominican Republic	1–0	2–0	2023–24 CONCACAF Nations League B	
7	16 October 2023	Estadio Nacional, Managua, Nicaragua	Montserrat	3–0	3–0	2023–24 CONCACAF Nations League B	
