= Armando Goufas =

Greek-born Nicaraguan footballer

Personal information
- Date of birth: 2 February 1995 (age 31)
- Place of birth: Athens, Greece
- Height: 1.72 m (5 ft 7 1/2 in)
- Position: Forward

Youth career
- –2014: AE Moschato
- 2014–2015: Panegialios

Senior career*
| Years | Team | Apps | (Gls) |
| 2015–2016 | Panegialios | 21 | (3) |
| 2016 | Apollon Smyrnis | 3 | (0) |
| 2017–2018 | Panegialios | 23 | (2) |
| 2018 | Radomiak Radom | | |
| 2018–2019 | Paleochora | 14 | (2) |
| 2019 | Irodotos | 12 | (1) |
| 2019 | Ionikos | 9 | (1) |
| 2020 | Pierikos | 0 | (0) |
| 2020 | Ierapetra | 3 | (0) |
| 2021 | Ypato | 3 | (0) |
| 2021 | Real Estelí | 8 | (1) |
| 2022 | Ypato | 11 | (1) |
| 2022–2023 | Aris Petroupolis | 19 | (2) |
| 2023–2024 | Acharnaikos | | |
| 2024 | A.E. Mykonos | | |
| 2024–2025 | Apollon Smyrnis | | |
| 2025–2026 | Asteras Magoula | | |

International career^{‡}
| 2019–2021 | Nicaragua | 9 | (1) |
- * Club domestic league appearances and goals as of February 2026 ‡ National team caps and goals as of 2021

Armando Goufas (Greek: Αρμάντο Γκούφας; born 2 February 1995) is a Greek-born Nicaraguan footballer who last played as a forward for Asteras Magoula and the Nicaragua national team.

== Early life ==
Goufas was born in Athens to a Greek father and a Nicaraguan mother.

== International career ==
He made his debut for Nicaragua national football team on 3 March 2019 in a friendly against Bolivia.

=== International goals ===
Scores and results list Nicaragua's goal tally first

| No. | Date | Venue | Opponent | Score | Result | Competition |
|---|---|---|---|---|---|---|
| 1 | 3 March 2019 | Estadio Bicentenario, Villa Tunari, Bolivia | Bolivia | 2–0 | 2–2 | Friendly |
