= Dale Eve =

Bermudian footballer (born 1995)

Personal information
- Full name: Dale Donald Eve
- Date of birth: 9 February 1995 (age 31)
- Place of birth: Pembroke Parish, Bermuda
- Height: 1.93 m (6 ft 4 in)
- Position: Goalkeeper

Youth career
- 2008–2011: Dandy Town Hornets
- 2011: Derby County
- 2011–2012: Stoke City

Senior career*
Years	Team	Apps	(Gls)
2012–2016	Stoke City	0	(0)
2013	→ Fleetwood Town (loan)	0	(0)
2014	→ Nuneaton Town (loan)	2	(0)
2014	→ Newcastle Town (loan)	3	(0)
2015	→ Congleton Town (loan)	9	(0)
2015	→ Forest Green Rovers (loan)	0	(0)
2016	Forest Green Rovers	0	(0)
2016–2017	Dandy Town	?	(?)
2017	Ilkeston	?	(?)
2017	Rushall Olympic	1	(0)
2017–2018	Kidderminster Harriers	0	(0)
2018–2020	Robin Hood	?	(?)
2020–2022	Spennymoor Town	33	(0)
2022–2023	Hereford	12	(0)
2023	→ Bedford Town (dual registration)	3	(0)
2023	→ Stourport Swifts (dual registration)	1	(0)
2023	→ Hanley Town (dual registration)	10	(0)
2023	Alvechurch	9	(0)
2023	Walsall Wood (dual registration)	11	(0)
2024	Alvechurch	3	(0)

International career^{‡}
2011	Bermuda U17	5	(0)
2011–	Bermuda	27	(0)
- * Club domestic league appearances and goals as of 17:00, 5 February 2024 (UTC) ‡ National team caps and goals as of 11:26, 29 July 2023 (UTC)

Dale Donald Eve (born 9 February 1995) is a Bermudian footballer who plays as a goalkeeper for the Bermuda national team.

== Career ==
=== Stoke City ===
Eve started playing football for his local side Dandy Town Hornets before moving to England to play for Derby County's youth team. He spent a short time in the East Midlands before being spotted by scouts at Premier League club Stoke City who signed him to on a two-year development contract in June 2011 beating off competition from Manchester City. Eve made his international debut at the age of 16 making him Stoke City's youngest player to be capped taking the record from Hungarian Ádám Vass. In May 2012 Eve signed a two-year professional contract with Stoke.

Eve joined Fleetwood Town on loan in December 2013 and made three substitute appearances on the bench before returning to Stoke City in January 2014. He joined Nuneaton Town on loan in March 2014 and made his debut on 28 March against Braintree Town. Speaking after his loan spell at Nuneaton Eve stated that it was a "humbling experience".

In the 2014–15 season, Eve had short loan spells with non-league sides Newcastle Town and Congleton Town. Eve joined Forest Green Rovers on a one-month loan in September 2015. He returned to Stoke in November 2015, with his only appearance for Forest Green coming in a FA Cup qualifier against Margate.

=== Forest Green Rovers ===
Eve joined Forest Green Rovers on 4 February 2016 on a free transfer. He was a part of a squad that reached the 2015-16 National League play-off final at Wembley Stadium, but did not make an appearance in the final as the club lost 3–1 to Grimsby Town to miss out on promotion to the Football League. It was announced on 16 May 2016 that he had been released at the end of his contract at The New Lawn.

=== Later career ===
Eve returned to Bermuda for a spell back at Dandy Town but in January 2017 moved back to England to sign for Ilkeston. In October 2017 he spent time on trial at Football League side Walsall. Shortly after he had a spell with Rushall Olympic, before moving to Kidderminster Harriers in November 2017. He later returned to Bermuda, signing for Robin Hood on 23 February 2018.

In February 2020, he joined Spennymoor Town. In May 2020 it was announced that he had extended his stay at Spennymoor. In October 2022, he signed for Hereford. He has also had spells with Bedford Town, Stourport Swifts and Hanley Town.

In June 2023, it was announced that Eve had signed for Alvechurch, despite being invited back to pre-season training with Hereford.

On 10 November 2023, Eve joined Northern Premier League Division One Midlands club Walsall Wood.

== International career ==
Eve has progressed through the youth teams of Bermuda and was called up to the senior squad in November 2011. He made his international debut for the "Gombey Warriors" in a 2014 FIFA World Cup qualification match against Barbados where he came on as a second-half substitute in a 2–1 victory. He appeared again for the national football team in March 2015 playing the second round of the 2018 FIFA World Cup qualification match against Bahamas and keeping a clean sheet in a 3–0 victory. In the next round, he played the second leg match against Guatemala in a 1–0 loss that eliminated Bermuda from the qualifiers.

== Career statistics ==
=== Club ===
As of match played 20 February 2024

Appearances and goals by club, season and competition
Club	Season	League			FA Cup		Other		Total	
Club	Season	Division	Apps	Goals	Apps	Goals	Apps	Goals	Apps	Goals
Stoke City	2013–14	Premier League	0	0	0	0	—		0	0
Stoke City	2014–15	Premier League	0	0	0	0	—		0	0
Stoke City	2015–16	Premier League	0	0	0	0	—		0	0
Stoke City	Total		0	0	0	0	—		0	0
Fleetwood Town (loan)	2013–14	League Two	0	0	0	0	0	0	0	0
Nuneaton Town (loan)	2013–14	Conference Premier	2	0	0	0	0	0	2	0
Congleton Town (loan)	2014–15	North West Counties League Premier Division	9	0	0	0	1 (Note: Appearance(s) in Cheshire Senior Cup)	0	10	0
Forest Green Rovers	2015–16 (Note: Part of this season was spent on loan from Stoke City)	National League	0	0	1	0	2 (Note: Appearance(s) in Gloucestershire Senior Cup)	0	3	0
Rushall Olympic	2017–18	Northern Premier League Premier Division	1	0	0	0	0	0	1	0
Kidderminster Harriers	2017–18	National League North	0	0	0	0	0	0	0	0
Spennymoor Town	2019–20	National League North	1	0	0	0	0	0	1	0
Spennymoor Town	2020–21	National League North	13	0	0	0	2 (Note: Appearance(s) in FA Trophy)	0	15	0
Spennymoor Town	2021–22	National League North	19	0	0	0	1	0	20	0
Spennymoor Town	Total		33	0	0	0	3	0	36	0
Hereford	2022–23	National League North	12	0	2	0	0	0	14	0
Bedford Town (dual reg)	2022–23	Southern League Premier Division Central	3	0	0	0	—		3	0
Stourport Swifts (dual reg)	2022–23	Midland League Premier Division	1	0	0	0	—		1	0
Hanley Town (dual reg)	2022–23	Northern Premier League Division One West	10	0	0	0	—		10	0
Alvechurch	2023–24	Southern League Premier Division Central	9	0	2	0	—		11	0
Walsall Wood	2023–24	Northern Premier League Division One Midlands	11	0	0	0	2 (Note: One appearance in FA Trophy; one appearance in Walsall Senior Cup)	0	13	0
Career total			91	0	5	0	8	0	104	0

=== International ===
As of match played 12 June 2023

National team	Year	Apps	Goals
Bermuda
Bermuda	2011	1	0
Bermuda	2015	3	0
Bermuda	2016	3	0
Bermuda	2018	2	0
Bermuda	2019	11	0
Bermuda	2021	5	0
Bermuda	2022	3	0
Bermuda	2023	4	0
Total		27	0
