= Kevin Serapio =

Nicaraguan footballer

Personal information
- Full name: Kevin José Serapio Oviedo
- Date of birth: 9 April 1996 (age 30)
- Place of birth: Bilwi, Nicaragua
- Position: Midfielder

Team information
- Current team: Managua

Senior career*
| Years | Team | Apps | (Gls) |
| 2015– | Managua | 137 | (14) |

International career^{‡}
| 2012 | Nicaragua U17 | 4 | (0) |
| 2019– | Nicaragua | 12 | (0) |
- * Club domestic league appearances and goals as of 1 June 2019 ‡ National team caps and goals as of 24 June 2019

Kevin José Serapio Oviedo, known as Kevin Serapio (born 9 April 1996) is a Nicaraguan football player. He plays for Managua.

== International ==
He made his Nicaragua national football team debut on 3 March 2019 in a friendly against Bolivia.

He was selected for the 2019 CONCACAF Gold Cup squad.
