= USC Upstate Spartans =

Athletics teams of the University of South Carolina Upstate

- University: University of South Carolina Upstate
- NCAA: Division I
- Conference: Big South (primary)
- Athletic director: Matthew Martin
- Location: Spartanburg, South Carolina
- Varsity teams: 17 (7 men's, 9 women's, 1 co-ed)
- Basketball arena: G. B. Hodge Center
- Baseball stadium: Cleveland S. Harley Baseball Park
- Softball stadium: Cyrill Softball Stadium
- Soccer stadium: County University Soccer Stadium
- Nickname: Spartans
- Colors: Upstate Green and Black
- Mascot: Sparty the Spartan
- Website: upstatespartans.com
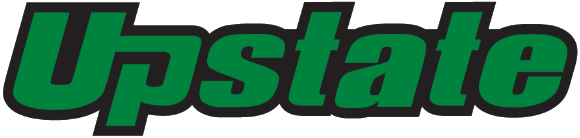

The USC Upstate Spartans are the athletic teams that represent the University of South Carolina Upstate, located in Spartanburg, South Carolina, in intercollegiate sports at the Division I level of the National Collegiate Athletic Association (NCAA), primarily competing in the Big South Conference since the 2018–19 academic year.

USC Upstate competes in fifteen intercollegiate varsity sports. Men's sports include baseball, basketball, cross country, golf, soccer, and track and field (indoor and outdoor); while women's sports include basketball, cross country, golf, soccer, softball, track and field (indoor and outdoor), and volleyball. Men's and women's tennis were discontinued at the end of the 2019–20 school year.

From 1971 to 2004, the school teams were known as the University of South Carolina Spartanburg Rifles in reference to a militia unit that won a victory at the Battle of Cowpens in the Revolutionary War. The move was quoted as being done to "allow the University to maintain a reference to the heritage of our community."

== Conference affiliations ==
=== NCAA ===
- Peach Belt Conference (1990–2007)
- ASUN Conference (2007–2018)
- Big South Conference (2018–present)

== Varsity teams ==
USC Upstate also sponsored both men's and women's tennis until 2019–20 when the programs were discontinued. The school also recognizes its coed cheerleading squad and its all-female dance team as varsity teams, though neither sport is NCAA-sanctioned.

Women's flag football will be added in 2026–27. The addition was announced shortly after the sport entered the NCAA Emerging Sports for Women program.

Men's sports	Women's sports
Baseball	Basketball
Basketball	Cross country
Cross country	Flag football (2026–27)
Golf	Golf
Soccer	Soccer
Track and field^{†}	Softball
	Track and field^{†}
	Volleyball
† – Track and field includes both indoor and outdoor

== Notable alumni ==
=== Baseball ===
- Chad Sobotka

=== Men's basketball ===
- Torrey Craig
- Ty Greene

=== Men's soccer ===
- Joel Bunting
- Calon Minors
- Troy Simon
- Jorge Valenzuela
