= Henry Maradiaga =

Nicaraguan footballer

Personal information
- Full name: Henry Alberto Maradiaga Galeano
- Date of birth: February 5, 1990 (age 36)
- Place of birth: Jalapa, Nicaragua
- Height: 1.80 m (5 ft 11 in)
- Position: Goalkeeper

Team information
- Current team: Juventus Managua

Senior career*
Years	Team	Apps	(Gls)
2010-2013	Real Estelí		
2013–2014	Deportivo Ocotal	16	(0)
2015	UNAN Managua	15	(0)
2015–2018	Real Estelí	84	(0)
2018–2019	Juventus Managua	29	(0)
2019–2020	Real Estelí	27	(0)
2020–	Municipal Jalapa		(0)

International career^{‡}
2010	Nicaragua U21	3	(0)
2011	Nicaragua U23	2	(0)
2018–	Nicaragua	7	(0)
- * Club domestic league appearances and goals as of 5 May 2019 ‡ National team caps and goals as of 24 June 2019

Henry Alberto Maradiaga Galeano (born 5 February 1990) is a Nicaraguan footballer who plays as a goalkeeper for Juventus Managua and the Nicaragua national team.
