= Traddie Simpson =

Bermudian cricketer (born 1970)

Personal information
- Full name: Traddie Simpson
- Born: 28 July 1970 (age 56)
- Batting: Left-handed
- Bowling: Left-arm fast-medium

Domestic team information
- Years: Team
- 2007/08: Bermuda

Career statistics
Competition	Twenty20
Matches	1
Runs scored	1
Batting average	–
100s/50s	–/–
Top score	1*
Balls bowled	18
Wickets	1
Bowling average	21.00
5 wickets in innings	–
10 wickets in match	–
Best bowling	1/21
Catches/stumpings	–/–
- Source: Cricinfo, 1 April 2013

Traddie Simpson (born 28 July 1970) is a former Bermudian cricketer. Simpson was a left-handed batsman who bowled left-arm fast-medium.

In January 2008, Bermuda were again invited to part in the 2008 Stanford 20/20, where Simpson made a single Twenty20 appearance against Guyana in the first round. Bermuda made 62/9 from their twenty overs, with Brangman ending the innings not out on 1. In Guyana's successful chase, Traddie took the wicket of Travis Dowlin, ending with figures of 1/21 from three overs.
