= Byron Bonilla =

Nicaraguan footballer

Personal information
- Full name: Byron Bonilla Martínez
- Date of birth: 30 August 1993 (age 33)
- Place of birth: Granada, Nicaragua
- Height: 1.74 m (5 ft 9 in)
- Positions: Left winger; left midfielder

Team information
- Current team: Real Estelí
- Number: 7

Senior career*
Years	Team	Apps	(Gls)
2016–2018	Sporting San José		
2019	→ Municipal Grecia (loan)		
2019–2020	→ Deportivo Saprissa (loan)	18	(0)
2020–2022	Cartaginés	89	(7)
2023–	Real Estelí	28	(4)

International career^{‡}
2016–	Nicaragua	41	(7)
- * Club domestic league appearances and goals as of 20:36, 26 September 2023 (UTC) ‡ National team caps and goals as of 20:00, 6 September 2025 (UTC)

Byron Bonilla Martínez (born 30 August 1993) is a Nicaraguan professional footballer who plays as a forward for Liga Primera club Real Estelí and the Nicaragua national team.

== Club career ==
=== Early career ===
Byron Bonilla was born in Granada, Nicaragua, but he moved to Costa Rica along with his mother at the age of nine. During his childhood, Bonilla did not have a football education, and he felt interested in practicing it when he turned sixteen.

Byron played for Costa Rican LINAFA clubs like San Pablo, San Rafael, and JK Sporting. He spelled a two-month period with Saprissa de Corazón of the Second Division, however he had to leave the team because of permanency issues in the country.

=== Sporting San José ===
In mid 2016, Bonilla was acquired by the Second Division team Sporting San José ahead of their inaugural season in the league. He made his official debut on 1 October in the 0−5 victory over Coto Brus. He finished his first season with eight goals.

At the 2017—18 season, he became one of the leaders for the team and was awarded as the best foreign player.

=== Municipal Grecia ===
On 11 January 2019, signed a six-month loan deal with First Division club Municipal Grecia.

=== Deportivo Saprissa ===
On 22 May 2019, Deportivo Saprissa announced that Bonilla joined the club on a two-year contract, on loan from Sporting San José.

== International career ==
On 8 December 2016, Bonilla received his first call-up to the Nicaragua national team managed by Henry Duarte. He debuted on 30 December in a match against Trinidad and Tobago, as a substitution for Daniel Cadena at the beginning of the second half.

On 4 June 2019, Bonilla was named to Nicaragua's final 23-man for the 2019 CONCACAF Gold Cup.

=== International goals ===
Scores and results list Nicaragua's goal tally first.

List of international goals scored by Byron Bonilla
No.	Date	Venue	Opponent	Score	Result	Competition
1	14 October 2019	Windsor Park, Roseau, Dominica	Dominica	2–0	4–0	2019–20 CONCACAF Nations League B
2	14 October 2019	Windsor Park, Roseau, Dominica	Dominica	3–0	4–0	2019–20 CONCACAF Nations League B
3	5 June 2021	Estadio Nacional, Managua, Nicaragua	Belize	2–0	3–0	2022 FIFA World Cup qualification
4	3 June 2022	Estadio Nacional, Managua, Nicaragua	Trinidad and Tobago	2–1	2–1	2022–23 CONCACAF Nations League B
5	6 June 2022	Arnos Vale Stadium, Arnos Vale, Saint Vincent and the Grenadines	Saint Vincent and the Grenadines	1–1	2–2	2022–23 CONCACAF Nations League B
6	17 November 2022	Estadio Nacional, Managua, Nicaragua	El Salvador	1–0	1–0	Friendly
7	6 September 2025	Estadio Nacional, Managua, Nicaragua	Costa Rica	1–1	1–1	2026 FIFA World Cup qualification
8	24 September 2026	Estadio Cibao , Santiago de los Caballeros, Republica Dominicana	Dominican Republic	2–2	2–3	2026–27 CONCACAF Nations League A

== Honours ==
Individual

- Best foreign player of the Costa Rican Second Division: 2017–18
- Best XI of the Costa Rican Second Division: 2017–18
- Included on the team of the week of the Costa Rican Second Division: 2017 Apertura, weeks 4, 5, 6, 11, 18, quarter–finals second leg, semi–finals second leg.
- Most valuable player of the week: 2017 Apertura, week 4.
- Included on the team of the week of the Costa Rican Second Division: 2018 Clausura, weeks 9, quarter–finals second leg, semi–finals first and second leg.

Liga Primera (C2023)
