= Elías Aguilar =

Costa Rican football player (born 1991)

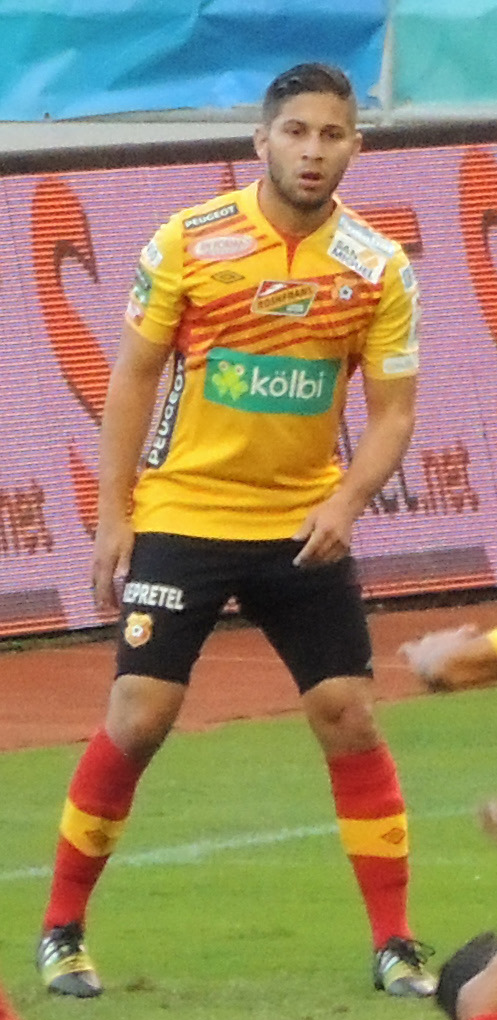
- Aguilar with Herediano in 2015

Personal information
- Full name: Elías Fernando Aguilar Vargas
- Date of birth: 7 November 1991 (age 35)
- Place of birth: Heredia, Costa Rica
- Height: 1.74 m (5 ft 8 1/2 in)
- Position: Midfielder

Team information
- Current team: Herediano
- Number: 10

Youth career
- Liberia

Senior career*
Years	Team	Apps	(Gls)
2011–2013	Herediano	42	(4)
2013–2014	Atlético Zacatepec	13	(1)
2014–2018	Herediano	158	(24)
2018	→ Incheon United (loan)	35	(3)
2019–2021	Jeju United	26	(4)
2020	→ Incheon United (loan)	17	(2)
2021–2022	Incheon United	65	(5)
2023–	Herediano	71	(9)

International career^{‡}
2015–	Costa Rica	20	(2)
- * Club domestic league appearances and goals as of 15:04, 20 June 2023 (UTC) ‡ National team caps and goals as of 10 September 2020

Elías Fernando Aguilar Vargas (Spanish pronunciation: [eˈli.as aɣiˈlaɾ]; born 7 November 1991) is a Costa Rican professional footballer who plays as a midfielder for Liga FPD club Herediano.

== Career ==
He was called up to the Costa Rica team for the 2015 CONCACAF Gold Cup; he played in Costa Rica's opening game.

In February 2018 he joined K League 1 side Incheon United on a 10-month loan deal.

== Career statistics ==
=== International ===
As of match played 29 June 2019

Appearances and goals by national team and year
National team	Year	Apps	Goals
Costa Rica	2015	8	0
Costa Rica	2017	4	0
Costa Rica	2018	2	0
Costa Rica	2019	6	2
Total		20	2

Scores and results list Costa Rica's goal tally first.

No.	Date	Venue	Opponent	Score	Result	Competition
1	16 June 2019	Estadio Nacional, San José, Costa Rica	Nicaragua	3–0	4–0	2019 CONCACAF Gold Cup
2	20 June 2019	Toyota Stadium, Frisco, United States	Bermuda	2–0	2–1	2019 CONCACAF Gold Cup
