= Jorge Betancur =

Footballer (born 1991)

Personal information
- Full name: Jorge Andrés Betancur Bustamante
- Date of birth: 19 August 1991 (age 35)
- Place of birth: Supía, Colombia
- Height: 1.87 m (6 ft 2 in)
- Positions: Forward; midfielder

Team information
- Current team: Managua
- Number: 8

Senior career*
Years	Team	Apps	(Gls)
2014–2015	Villa Española	13	(0)
2016	Juventus Managua	15	(2)
2017	Atlético Huila	13	(1)
2017	Envigado	7	(0)
2018–2021	Real Estelí	93	(14)
2021	Lynx	7	(1)
2022–	Managua	51	(2)

International career^{‡}
2019	Nicaragua	14	(0)
- * Club domestic league appearances and goals as of 7 May 2023 ‡ National team caps and goals as of 19 November 2019

Jorge Andrés Betancur Bustamante (born 19 August 1991) is a footballer who plays as a forward for Liga Primera de Nicaragua club Managua FC.

Born and raised in Colombia to Colombian parents, Betancur has played in the Nicaraguan league and subsequently capped for the Nicaragua national team.

== Club career ==
A former player of Villa Española in the Uruguayan Segunda División, Betancur debuted in the Liga Primera de Nicaragua for Juventus Managua from August to October 2016. Shortly after, he returned to Colombia, joining Atlético Huila. He spent the entire 2017 in the Colombian Primera A. Besides Huila, he also played for Envigado.

== International career ==
Having arrived to Nicaragua for the second time in January 2018 to play for Real Estelí, Betancur became a naturalized citizen just a year later, in 2019. According La Prensa, he did not comply with the Nationality Law No. 149 at the moment of his naturalization. By debuting for Nicaragua that very 2019, he also failed with the FIFA eligibility rules.
