= Willie Clemons =

Bermudan footballer (born 1994)

Personal information
- Full name: Willie Minkah Ajani Clemons
- Date of birth: 24 September 1994 (age 32)
- Place of birth: Paget Island, Bermuda
- Height: 1.78 m (5 ft 10 in)
- Position: Midfielder

Team information
- Current team: Leiston

Youth career
- –2013: Southampton Rangers

College career
Years	Team	Apps	(Gls)
2014–2017	Thomas College		

Senior career*
Years	Team	Apps	(Gls)
2018–2019	Bodens BK	39	(12)
2020–2021	Dalkurd FF	18	(1)
2021–2022	Stowmarket Town	27	(8)
2022–2023	Braintree Town	26	(1)
2024–2025	Felixstowe & Walton United	34	(6)
2025–	Leiston	0	(0)

International career^{‡}
2016–	Bermuda	31	(3)
- * Club domestic league appearances and goals as of 18:39, 29 May 2025 (UTC) ‡ National team caps and goals as of 11 June 2022

Willie Minkah Ajani Clemons (born 24 September 1994) is a Bermudan semi-professional footballer who played as a midfielder for Southern League Premier Division Central club Leiston and the Bermuda national team.

== Club career ==
Clemons made his international debut against Dominican Republic in June 2016.

On 2 January 2020, Clemons joined Dalkurd FF.

After spending the 2021–22 campaign with Stowmarket Town, Clemons joined National League South side, Braintree Town in August 2022. In May 2025, Clemons left Felixstowe & Walton United and joined Southern League Premier Division Central club Leiston.

== Career statistics ==
=== Club ===
As of match played 14 February 2023

Appearances and goals by club, season and competition
Club	Season	League			National cup		League cup		Other		Total	
Club	Season	Division	Apps	Goals	Apps	Goals	Apps	Goals	Apps	Goals	Apps	Goals
Bodens BK	2018	Division 2 Norrland	19	6	0	0	—		—		19	6
Bodens BK	2019	Ettan Norra	20	6	0	0	—		—		20	6
Bodens BK	Total		39	12	0	0	—		—		39	12
Dalkurd FF	2020	Superettan	18	1	3	0	—		2 (Note: Appearances in the Superettan play-offs)	0	23	1
Stowmarket Town	2021–22	Isthmian League North Division	27	8	0	0	—		1 (Note: Appearance in the Isthmian League North Division play-offs)	0	28	8
Braintree Town	2022–23	National League South	26	1	3	0	—		2 (Note: Appearances in the FA Trophy)	1	31	2
Career total			110	22	6	0	0	0	5	1	121	23

=== International ===
Scores and results list Bermuda's goal tally first, score column indicates score after each Clemons goal.

List of international goals scored by Willie Clemons
No.	Date	Venue	Opponent	Score	Result	Competition
1	8 June 2017	Progress Park, Saint Andrew's, Grenada	Grenada	2–1	2–2	Friendly
2	28 October 2017	Bermuda National Stadium, Hamilton, Bermuda	Barbados	1–0	2–3	Friendly
3	11 June 2022	Félix Sánchez Olympic Stadium, Santo Domingo, Dominican Republic	Montserrat	1–1	2–3	2022–23 CONCACAF Nations League B
