= Steeven Saba =

Haitian footballer (born 1993)

Personal information
- Date of birth: 24 February 1993 (age 33)
- Place of birth: Port-au-Prince, Haiti
- Height: 1.80 m (5 ft 11 in)
- Position: Midfielder

Team information
- Current team: Violette
- Number: 77

Youth career
- 1999–2000: Saint-Louis-de-Gonzague
- 2000–2009: Shana
- Weston Academy

Senior career*
Years	Team	Apps	(Gls)
2018–2020	Violette	48	(19)
2020	Montreal Impact	0	(0)
2021–	Violette		

International career^{‡}
2018–	Haiti	19	(3)
- * Club domestic league appearances and goals ‡ National team caps and goals as of 11 June 2022

Steeven Saba (born 24 February 1993) is a Haitian professional footballer who plays as a central midfielder for Ligue Haïtienne club Violette and the Haiti national team. Saba is a dual-citizen of Haiti and the United States.

== Early years ==
Saba was born in Port-au-Prince, Haiti into a family of Lebanese descent. His father is the former footballer Grégory Saba.

== Club career ==
=== Montreal Impact ===
On 29 January 2020, Saba signed with the Montreal Impact of Major League Soccer to a one-year deal with options for 2021 and 2022.

Saba recalled his experience signing with the club as a "dream come true" for the opportunity to play for Impact manager and former France legend Thierry Henry. He openly expressed his gratitude to his former Haitian club Violette and the Haiti national team for helping to set the stage for him to participate in the 2019 CONCACAF Gold Cup where his international play had garnered some attention among clubs in the region.

On 12 March 2020, the MLS suspended play due to the COVID-19 pandemic. Saba, like other Impact players during this time, was unable to train inside the club's facility, having not been cleared from local health authorities and instead held voluntary training sessions. On 20 May 2020, Saba broke his left foot on a routine jog near his home in Montreal and was sidelined for eight to twelve weeks.

On 27 November 2020, Montreal declined to exercise his option for 2021.

== International career ==
=== United States ===
Saba, who also holds a United States passport, was called up by the United States men's national under-18 soccer team for a camp in 2009.

=== Haiti ===
Saba made his international debut for Haiti on 29 May 2018 in a friendly match against Argentina. In May 2019, he was named to the Haitian squad for the 2019 CONCACAF Gold Cup. Saba scored his first goal for Haiti during the tournament on 20 June against Nicaragua.

=== International goals ===
Scores and results list Haiti's goal tally first.

No.	Date	Venue	Opponent	Score	Result	Competition
1.	20 June 2019	Toyota Stadium, Frisco, United States	Nicaragua	2–0	2–0	2019 CONCACAF Gold Cup
2.	7 June 2022	Estadio Olímpico Félix Sánchez, Santo Domingo, Dominican Republic	Montserrat	3–1	3–2	2022–23 CONCACAF Nations League B
