= Camphers Pérez =

Nicaraguan footballer

Personal information
- Full name: Camphers Santiago Pérez Bermúdez
- Date of birth: 13 May 1998 (age 28)
- Place of birth: San Rafael del Sur, Nicaragua
- Height: 1.72 m (5 ft 8 in)
- Position: Defender

Team information
- Current team: Managua

Senior career*
Years	Team	Apps	(Gls)
2017–2018	San Francisco Masachapa	30	(2)
2018–	Managua	24	(0)

International career^{‡}
2018–	Nicaragua	6	(0)
- * Club domestic league appearances and goals as of 1 June 2019 ‡ National team caps and goals as of 24 June 2019

Camphers Santiago Pérez Bermúdez, known as Camphers Pérez (born 13 May 1998) is a Nicaraguan football player. He plays for Managua.

== International ==
He made his Nicaragua national football team debut on 22 March 2018 in a friendly against Cuba.

He was selected for the 2019 CONCACAF Gold Cup squad.
