= Mayron George =

Costa Rican footballer (born 1993)

Personal information
- Full name: Mayron Antonio George Clayton
- Date of birth: 23 October 1993 (age 33)
- Place of birth: Limón, Costa Rica
- Height: 1.89 m (6 ft 2 in)
- Position: Forward

Team information
- Current team: Sporting
- Number: 9

Youth career
- Limón

Senior career*
Years	Team	Apps	(Gls)
2009–2014	Limón	91	(17)
2014–2015	→ OFI (loan)	20	(2)
2015–2016	Hobro	26	(10)
2016–2018	Randers	22	(2)
2017–2018	→ Lyngby (loan)	24	(8)
2018	Lyngby	0	(0)
2018–2021	Midtjylland	25	(4)
2019	→ Vålerenga (loan)	10	(2)
2020	→ Budapest Honvéd (loan)	6	(1)
2020	→ Kalmar (loan)	3	(0)
2021	→ Pau FC (loan)	14	(7)
2021–2022	Lausanne-Sport	11	(0)
2022–2023	Pau FC	30	(7)
2023–2025	Beitar Jerusalem	52	(16)
2026–	Sporting	21	(4)

International career^{‡}
2014–	Costa Rica	15	(1)
- * Club domestic league appearances and goals as of 18 September 2026 ‡ National team caps and goals as of 4 October 2026

Mayron Antonio George Clayton (born 23 October 1993) is a Costa Rican professional footballer who plays for Israeli Premier League club Beitar Jerusalem.

== Career ==
On 3 August 2019, it was confirmed, that George had been loaned out from Midtjylland to Norwegian club Vålerenga for the rest of 2019. On 15 January 2020, he was loaned out again, this time to Hungarian club Budapest Honvéd FC until June 2020.

In June 2022, George returned to Pau.

== Career statistics ==
=== Club ===
As of match played on 18 September 2026

Appearances and goals by club, season and competition
Club	Season	League			Cup		League Cup		Continental		Other		Total	
Club	Season	Division	Apps	Goals	Apps	Goals	Apps	Goals	Apps	Goals	Apps	Goals	Apps	Goals
Limón	2010–11	Liga FPD	1	0	0	0	—		—		—		1	0
Limón	2011–12	Liga FPD	21	1	0	0	—		—		—		21	1
Limón	2012–13	Liga FPD	29	4	0	0	—		—		—		29	4
Limón	2013–14	Liga FPD	40	12	0	0	—		—		—		40	12
Limón	Total		91	17	0	0	0	0	0	0	0	0	91	17
OFI (loan)	2014–15	Super League Greece	20	2	5	3	—		—		—		25	5
Hobro	2015–16	Danish Superliga	24	9	0	0	—		—		—		24	9
Hobro	2016–17	Danish 1st Division	2	1	0	0	—		—		—		2	1
Hobro	Total		26	10	0	0	0	0	0	0	0	0	26	10
Randers	2016–17	Danish Superliga	15	2	1	0	—		—		—		16	2
Randers	2017–18	Danish Superliga	7	0	0	0	—		—		—		7	0
Randers	Total		22	2	1	0	0	0	0	0	0	0	23	2
Lyngby (loan)	2017–18	Danish Superliga	24	8	1	0	—		—		1	1	26	9
Midtjylland	2018–19	Danish Superliga	25	4	3	1	—		4	1	—		32	6
Vålerenga (loan)	2019	Eliteserien	10	2	0	0	—		—		—		10	2
Budapest Honvéd (loan)	2019–20	Nemzeti Bajnokság I	6	1	5	0	—		—		—		11	1
Kalmar FF (loan)	2020	Allsvenskan	3	0	0	0	—		—		—		3	0
Pau (loan)	2020–21	Ligue 2	14	7	4	2	—		—		—		18	9
Lausanne-Sport	2021–22	Swiss Super League	11	0	1	1	—		—		—		12	1
Pau	2022–23	Ligue 2	26	6	4	2	—		—		—		30	8
Pau	2023–24	Ligue 2	4	1	0	0	—		—		—		4	1
Pau	Total		30	7	4	2	0	0	0	0	0	0	34	9
Beitar Jerusalem	2023–24	Israeli Premier League	23	8	1	0	—		—		—		24	8
Beitar Jerusalem	2024–25	Israeli Premier League	29	8	5	3	—		—		—		34	11
Beitar Jerusalem	Total		52	16	9	3	0	0	0	0	0	0	68	19
Sporting	2025–26	Liga FPD	13	3	1	0	—		—		14	3		
Sporting	2026–27	Liga FPD	8	1	0	0	—		—		—		8	1
Sporting	Total		21	4	1	0	—		—		—		22	4
Career total			355	80	31	12	0	0	4	1	1	1	391	86

=== International ===
As of match played 4 October 2026

Appearances and goals by national team and year
National team	Year	Apps	Goals
Costa Rica	2014	2	0
Costa Rica	2015	1	0
Costa Rica	2018	4	0
Costa Rica	2019	7	1
Costa Rica	2026	1	0
Total		15	1

Scores and results list Costa Rica's goal tally first, score column indicates score after each George goal.

List of international goals scored by Mayron George
No.	Date	Venue	Opponent	Score	Result	Competition
1	19 June 2019	Toyota Stadium, Frisco, United States	Bermuda	1–0	2–1	2019 CONCACAF Gold Cup
