= Renato Punyed =

Footballer (born 1995)

Personal information
- Full name: Renato Estanislao Punyed Dubón
- Date of birth: 22 August 1995 (age 31)
- Place of birth: San Salvador, El Salvador
- Height: 1.72 m (5 ft 8 in)
- Position: Midfielder

Team information
- Current team: ÍR
- Number: 30

Youth career
- Kendall Soccer Academy

College career
Years	Team	Apps	(Gls)
2013–2016	High Point Panthers	78	(9)

Senior career*
Years	Team	Apps	(Gls)
2017	ÍBV	1	(0)
2017	→ ÍR (loan)	5	(1)
2018	Sortland	22	(3)
2019	Nybergsund	2	(0)
2020	Novigrad	1	(0)
2022–2023	Ægir	40	(1)
2024–	ÍR	36	(7)

International career^{‡}
2019–	Nicaragua	7	(0)
- * Club domestic league appearances and goals as of 15 October 2025 ‡ National team caps and goals as of 24 June 2019

Renato Estanislao Punyed Dubón (born 22 August 1995) is a footballer who plays as a midfielder for Icelandic club ÍR. He had also a spell with Norwegian club Nybergsund IL-Trysil. Born in El Salvador, he represents the Nicaragua national team.

== Early life ==
Punyed was born in San Salvador to a Salvadoran father of Spanish descent and a Nicaraguan mother. The family settled in Doral, Florida, United States.

== International career ==
Punyed made his debut for Nicaragua national team on 3 March 2019 in a friendly against Bolivia.

== Personal life ==
Punyed's older brother Pablo Punyed has played for El Salvador national team.
