= Jems Geffrard =

Haitian footballer (born 1994)

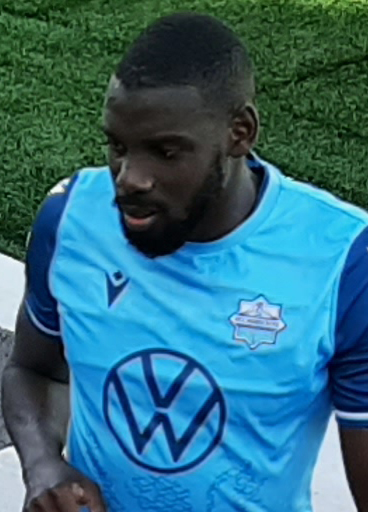
- Geffrard with HFX Wanderers in 2021

Personal information
- Full name: James Geffrard
- Date of birth: 26 August 1994 (age 32)
- Place of birth: Montreal, Quebec, Canada
- Height: 1.91 m (6 ft 3 in)
- Position: Centre-back

Youth career
- CS Rivière-des-Prairies
- 2011–2015: Montreal Impact

Senior career*
| Years | Team | Apps | (Gls) |
| 2011–2012 | Montreal Impact Academy | | |
| 2014 | Montreal Impact U23 | | |
| 2015–2016 | FC Montreal | 14 | (0) |
| 2017 | Ekenäs IF | 25 | (0) |
| 2018 | RoPS | 20 | (0) |
| 2019 | Fresno FC | 7 | (0) |
| 2020–2021 | HFX Wanderers | 22 | (0) |
| 2022 | CS Mont-Royal Outremont | 13 | (1) |

International career^{‡}
| 2017– | Haiti | 19 | (0) |
- * Club domestic league appearances and goals as of 30 September 2022 ‡ National team caps and goals as of 24 June 2021

James "Jems" Geffrard (born 26 August 1994) is a professional footballer who plays as a centre-back. Born in Canada, he plays for the Haiti national team.

== Early life ==
Geffrard began playing futsal at age 12 and began playing football at age 14, where he played youth soccer with CS Rivière-des-Prairies, before later joining the Montreal Impact Academy.

== Club career ==
Geffrard began his career in 2011 by signing with the Montreal Impact Academy, and competed in the Canadian Soccer League, and USL Premier Development League. In 2016, he signed with the Impact's second team, FC Montreal, in the United Soccer League.

In 2017, Geffrard left Canada to play for Ekenäs IF in Finland's second division.

The following season he signed to play in the Veikkausliiga with Rovaniemen Palloseura. He joined on a one-year contract with an option for an additional season. He left the club after the 2018 season.

In 2019, he joined Fresno FC in the USL Championship. Geffrard made his debut for Fresno FC on 15 May 2019, in a U.S. Open Cup match against El Farolito Soccer Club.

Ahead of the 2020 season, he was set to attend training camp with the Montreal Impact, but ultimately did not attend. On 18 February 2020, Geffrard signed with Canadian Premier League side HFX Wanderers. His contract with the Halifax-based club expired after the 2021 season.

For the 2022 season, he played in the Quebec-based Première ligue de soccer du Québec with CS Mont-Royal Outremont.

== International career ==
Internationally, Geffrard represents the Haiti national team, and made his debut against Japan on 10 October 2017. In May 2019, he was named to the Haitian squad for the 2019 CONCACAF Gold Cup, serving as one of the team's best players, and helped Haiti upset his native Canada 3–2 in the quarter-finals. Geffrard also represented Haiti at the 2021 CONCACAF Gold Cup.

== Honours ==
HFX Wanderers

- Canadian Premier League runner-up: 2020
