= Donte Brangman =

Bermudian footballer

Personal information
- Date of birth: 26 June 1994 (age 32)
- Place of birth: Bermuda
- Position: Midfielder

Team information
- Current team: Southampton Rangers

Senior career*
Years	Team	Apps	(Gls)
2013–2015	East Tennessee State Buccaneers	42	(1)
2015–2017	Robin Hood		
2017–	Southampton Rangers		

International career
2015–	Bermuda	13	(1)
- * Club domestic league appearances and goals as of 24 June 2019 (UTC)

Donte Brangman (born 26 June 1994) is a Bermudian footballer who plays for Southampton Rangers and the Bermuda national team.
