= Robin Hood F.C. =

Association football club in Bermuda

- Full name: The Robin Hood Football Club
- Founded: 1977; 49 years ago
- Ground: Goose Gosling Field (aka BAA Field), Pembroke Parish, Bermuda
- League: Bermudian First Division
- 2025–26: 2nd
Home colours

Robin Hood F.C. is a football club based in Pembroke Parish, Bermuda, that competes in the Bermudian Premier Division.

== History ==
The club was founded in 1977 and players were registered in the local Robin Hood pub. They have been in the Premier Division after winning promotion from the First Division in summer 2014. They had spent only a year in the second tier after suffering relegation from the Premier Division the year before.

== Achievements ==
=== Domestic ===
- Bermudian Premier Division: 1

2016–17

- Bermuda FA Cup: 3

2015–16, 2017–18, 2018–19

== Players ==
- For 2015–2016 season

Note: Flags indicate national team as defined under FIFA eligibility rules; some limited exceptions apply. Players may hold more than one non-FIFA nationality.

No.	Pos.	Nation	Player
—	GK	BER	Timothy Figureido
—	GK	BER	Jason Simons
—	DF	BER	Corey Boyce
—	DF	BER	Darius Cox
—	DF	BER	Chris Fosker
—	DF	BER	Philippe Froncioni
—	DF	BER	Marcus Johnson
—	DF	BER	Alex Martin
—	DF	BER	Erico Outerbridge
—	DF	BER	Joseph Perreira
—	DF	ENG	Darran Reitze
—	DF	BER	Dante Taylor
—	DF	BER	Jason Titterton
—	DF	BER	Tajae Williams
—	MF	BER	Daniel Andrade
—	MF	BER	Jaylon Bather

No.	Pos.	Nation	Player
—	MF	MAS	Aliff Izwan
—	MF	BER	Shaun Brown
—	MF	BER	Kenny DeSilva
—	MF	BER	Liam Evans
—	MF	BER	Andre Ivo
—	MF	BER	Aaron Nelson
—	MF	BER	Nathan Peskett
—	MF	BER	Lejuan Simmons
—	MF	BER	Marcelos Thomas
—	FW	BER	Donte Brangman
—	FW	BER	Shannon Burchall
—	FW	BER	Tre Dill
—	FW	BER	Mackih McGowan
—	FW	BER	Antwan Russell
—	FW	BER	Larri Simmons

== Past internationals ==
- The player(s) below had senior international cap(s) for their respective countries. Players whose name is listed, represented their countries before or after playing for Robin Hood FC.
- (Bermuda) Kilian Elkinson
- (India) Fredy Mascarenhas (2012–2015)
- (Bermuda) Dale Eve
