= Marc Collat =

French football coach (born 1950)

Personal information
- Full name: Marc Collat
- Date of birth: 24 May 1950 (age 76)
- Place of birth: Fort-de-France, Martinique, France
- Height: 1.80 m (5 ft 11 in)
- Position: Defender

Youth career
- 1960–1966: Châtillon-sous-Bagneux
- 1966–1969: USM Malakoff

Senior career*
Years	Team	Apps	(Gls)
1969–1972	RC Paris	12	(0)
1972–1980	USM Malakoff	246	(58)
1980–1982	Stade Français Paris	60	(11)
1982–1983	Versailles FC		
1983–1986	La Celle-Saint-Cloud		

Managerial career
- 1983–1986: La Celle-Saint-Cloud
- 1986–1989: Paris Saint-Germain (scout)
- 1987–1989: France U18
- 1989–1993: France B
- 1993–1994: Créteil
- 1995: Le Tampon
- 1995–1997: Saint-Brieuc
- 1998: Amiens (sports director)
- 1998–2000: Paris Saint-Germain (youth academy)
- 2000–2002: Reims
- 2003–2004: Qatar U19
- 2005–2006: Clermont Foot
- 2006–2008: USM Alger
- 2009: Mauritius
- 2009–2010: Reims
- 2014–2015: Haiti
- 2017: Athlético Marseille
- 2017–2019: Haiti
- 2021–2025: Martinique
- * Club domestic league appearances and goals

Marc Collat (born 24 May 1950) is a Martinican-French professional football former player who most recently was the head coach of Martinique.
