= Francisco Flores (footballer, born 1988) =

Nicaraguan footballer (born 1988)

Personal information
- Full name: Francisco Roberto Flores Zapata
- Date of birth: 2 April 1988 (age 38)
- Place of birth: Liberia, Costa Rica
- Height: 1.67 m (5 ft 6 in)
- Positions: Left back; left midfielder

Team information
- Current team: Diriangén
- Number: 21

Senior career*
| Years | Team | Apps | (Gls) |
| 2007–2009 | Liberia Mía | 10 | (2) |
| 2009–2010 | Águilas Guanacastecas | 14 | (0) |
| 2010–2011 | Barrio México | 16 | (1) |
| 2011–2012 | Puntarenas FC | 37 | (3) |
| 2012–2013 | Alajuelense | 12 | (0) |
| 2013 | Pérez Zeledón | 10 | (1) |
| 2014–2015 | Puntarenas FC | 21+ | (0+) |
| 2015–2016 | Municipal Liberia | 26 | (5) |
| 2016 | Stumbras | 9 | (1) |
| 2016–2018 | Municipal Liberia | 76 | (3) |
| 2018–2019 | Santos de Guápiles | 23 | (0) |
| 2020–2022 | Jicaral | 69 | (2) |
| 2022– | Diriangén | 43 | (0) |

International career^{‡}
| 2015 | Costa Rica | 1 | (0) |
| 2018– | Nicaragua | 26 | (1) |
- * Club domestic league appearances and goals as of 18 May 2024 ‡ National team caps and goals as of 18 June 2023

Francisco Roberto Flores Zapata (born 2 April 1988) is a footballer who plays as a left back for Liga Primera de Nicaragua club Diriangén. Born in Costa Rica, he represents Nicaragua at international level. He previously appeared with his country of birth national team.

== International career ==
Flores was born in Costa Rica to a Nicaraguan father and Costa Rican mother. He made one friendly appearance for the Costa Rica national team in 2015, before switching to represent Nicaragua.
