= BAA Wanderers F.C. =

Bermuda Athletic Association Wanderers Football Club is a Bermudian association football team.
