= 2016 in American soccer =

Soccer in the United States
- Season: 2016

Men's soccer
- Supporters' Shield: FC Dallas
- NASL: New York Cosmos
- USL: New York Red Bulls II
- NPSL: AFC Cleveland
- PDL: Michigan Bucks
- US Open Cup: FC Dallas
- MLS Cup: Seattle Sounders FC

Women's soccer
- NWSL: Western New York Flash
- WPSL: Boston Breakers Reserves
- UWS: Santa Clarita Blue Heat
- Women's Open: Olympic Club

The 2016 season was the 104th season of competitive soccer in the United States.

== National teams ==
=== Men ===
==== Senior ====
Wins	Losses	Draws
12	6	1

===== Friendlies =====
January 31	United States	3–2	Iceland	Carson, California
12:45 PT	Altidore 20'; Orozco 59'; Nagbe (yellow card) 72'; Birnbaum 90'	Report	Steindórsson 13'; Fjóluson (yellow card) 45'; Sigurðarson 48'	Stadium: StubHub Center; Attendance: 8,803; Referee: Jeffrey Solis (Costa Rica)

February 5	United States	1–0	Canada	Carson, California
19:15 PT	Besler (yellow card) 42'; Altidore 89'	Report	Henry (yellow card) 79'	Stadium: StubHub Center; Attendance: 9,274; Referee: Marlon Mejía (El Salvador)

May 22	Puerto Rico	1–3	United States	Bayamón, Puerto Rico
12:00 EST	Betancur 42'	Report	Ream 20'; Wood 34'; Arriola 56'	Stadium: Juan Ramón Loubriel Stadium; Referee: Kimball Ward (Saint Kitts and Nevis)

May 25	United States	1–0	Ecuador	Frisco, Texas
20:00PM EST	Jones (yellow card) 26'; Nagbe 90'	Report	Achilier (yellow card) 22'; Ramírez (yellow card) 35'; Mena (yellow card) 45'	Stadium: Toyota Stadium; Attendance: 9,893; Referee: José Alfredo Peñaloza (Mexico)

May 28	United States	4–0	Bolivia	Kansas City, Kansas
20:00PM EST	Zardes 26', 52'; Brooks 37'; Pulisic 69'	report	Campos (yellow card) 30'; Duk (yellow card) 76'	Stadium: Children's Mercy Park; Attendance: 8,894; Referee: Elmer Bonilla (El Salvador)

October 7	Cuba	0–2	United States	Havana, Cuba
		Report	Wondolowski 62'; Green 71'	Stadium: Estadio Pedro Marrero; Referee: Jafeth Perea (Panama)

October 11	United States	1–1	New Zealand	Washington, D.C.
20:00 ET	Green 27'	Report	Patterson 72'	Stadium: RFK Stadium; Attendance: 9,012; Referee: Juan Carlos Guerra (Guatemala)

===== World Cup qualifying =====
====== Fourth round ======
Pos	Team	Pld	W	D	L	GF	GA	GD	Pts	Qualification	United States	Trinidad and Tobago	Guatemala	Saint Vincent and the Grenadines
1	United States	6	4	1	1	20	3	+17	13	Advance to fifth round	—	4–0	4–0	6–1
2	Trinidad and Tobago	6	3	2	1	13	9	+4	11	Advance to fifth round	0–0	—	2–2	6–0
3	Guatemala	6	3	1	2	18	11	+7	10		2–0	1–2	—	9–3
4	Saint Vincent and the Grenadines	6	0	0	6	6	34	−28	0		0–6	2–3	0–4	—

Source: FIFA
Rules for classification: Qualification tiebreakers

March 25 Group C	Guatemala	2–0	United States	Guatemala City, Guatemala
22:00 ET	Morales 7'; Hernandez (yellow card) 8'; Ruiz 15'; Pappa (yellow card) 78'	Report	Bradley (yellow card) 83'	Stadium: Estadio Mateo Flores; Referee: Jafeth Perea (Panama)

March 29 Group C	United States	4–0	Guatemala	Columbus, Ohio
19:00 EST	Dempsey 12'; Cameron 35'; Zusi 46'; Altidore 89'	Report	Jiménez (yellow card) 34'	Stadium: Mapfre Stadium; Attendance: 20,624; Referee: Valdin Legister (Jamaica)

September 2 Group C	Saint Vincent and the Grenadines	0–6	United States	Kingstown, Saint Vincent and the Grenadines
15:30 ET		Report	Wood 28'; Besler 32'; Altidore 43' (pen.); Pulisic 71', 90+2'; Kljestan 78'	Stadium: Arnos Vale Stadium; Referee: Mathieu Bourdeau (Canada)

September 6 Group C	United States	4–0	Trinidad and Tobago	Jacksonville, Florida
20:00 ET	Kljestan 44'; Altidore 59', 63'; Arriola 71'	Report		Stadium: EverBank Field; Attendance: 19,410; Referee: Ricardo Montero (Costa Rica)

====== Fifth round ======
Pos	Team	Pld	W	D	L	GF	GA	GD	Pts	Qualification	(Mexico)	(Costa Rica)	(Panama)	(Honduras)	(United States)	(Trinidad and Tobago)
1	Mexico	10	6	3	1	16	7	+9	21	Qualification to 2018 FIFA World Cup	—	2–0	1–0	3–0	1–1	3–1
2	Costa Rica	10	4	4	2	14	8	+6	16	Qualification to 2018 FIFA World Cup	1–1	—	0–0	1–1	4–0	2–1
3	Panama	10	3	4	3	9	10	−1	13	Qualification to 2018 FIFA World Cup	0–0	2–1	—	2–2	1–1	3–0
4	Honduras	10	3	4	3	13	19	−6	13	Advance to inter-confederation play-offs	3–2	1–1	0–1	—	1–1	3–1
5	United States	10	3	3	4	17	13	+4	12		1–2	0–2	4–0	6–0	—	2–0
6	Trinidad and Tobago	10	2	0	8	7	19	−12	6		0–1	0–2	1–0	1–2	2–1	—

Source: FIFA
Rules for classification: Qualification tiebreakers

November 11 Fifth round	United States	1–2	Mexico	Columbus, Ohio
19:45 ET	Wood 49'	Report	Layún 20'; Márquez 89'	Stadium: Mapfre Stadium; Attendance: 24,650; Referee: Walter López Castellanos (Guatemala)

November 15 Fifth round	Costa Rica	4–0	United States	San José, Costa Rica
21:00 ET	Venegas 44'; Bolaños 68'; Campbell 74', 78'	Report		Stadium: Estadio Nacional de Costa Rica; Attendance: 35,400; Referee: César Arturo Ramos (Mexico)

===== Copa América Centenario =====
June 3 Group stage	United States	0–2	Colombia	Santa Clara, California
21:30 ET		Report	Zapata 8'; Rodríguez 42' (pen.)	Stadium: Levi's Stadium; Attendance: 67,439; Referee: Roberto García (Mexico)

June 7 Group stage	United States	4–0	Costa Rica	Chicago, Illinois
20:00 ET	Dempsey 8' (pen.); Jones 36'; Wood 41'; Zusi 86'	Report		Stadium: Soldier Field; Attendance: 39,642; Referee: Roddy Zambrano (Ecuador)

June 11 Group stage	Paraguay	0–1	United States	Philadelphia, Pennsylvania
19:00 ET		Report	Dempsey 27'	Stadium: Lincoln Financial Field; Attendance: 51,041; Referee: Julio Bascuñán (Chile)

June 16 QF	United States	2–1	Ecuador	Seattle, Washington
18:30 PT	Dempsey 22'; Zardes 65'	Report	Arroyo 74'	Stadium: CenturyLink Field; Attendance: 47,322; Referee: Wilmar Roldán (Colombia)

June 21 SF	United States	0–4	Argentina	Houston, Texas
19:00 ET		Report	Lavezzi 3'; Messi 32'; Higuaín 50', 86'	Stadium: NRG Stadium; Attendance: 70,858; Referee: Enrique Cáceres (Paraguay)

June 25 3rd Place	United States	0–1	Colombia	Glendale, Arizona
20:00 ET		Report	Bacca 31'	Stadium: University of Phoenix Stadium; Attendance: 29,041; Referee: Daniel Fedorczuk (Uruguay)

===== Goalscorers =====
Goals are current as of November 15, 2016, after match against Costa Rica.

Player	Goals
Jozy Altidore	6
Clint Dempsey	4
Bobby Wood	4
Gyasi Zardes	3
Christian Pulisic	3
Graham Zusi	2
Sacha Kljestan	2
Paul Arriola	2
Julian Green	2
Geoff Cameron	1
Michael Orozco	1
Steve Birnbaum	1
Tim Ream	1
Darlington Nagbe	1
John Brooks	1
Jermaine Jones	1
Matt Besler	1
Chris Wondolowski	1

===== Managerial changes =====
This is a list of changes of managers:

Team	Outgoing manager	Manner of departure	Date of departure	Incoming manager	Date of appointment
United States	(Germany) Jürgen Klinsmann	Fired	November 21	(United States) Bruce Arena	November 22

==== U-23 ====
===== Olympic qualifying =====
March 25 First leg	Colombia	1–1	United States	Barranquilla, Colombia
17:00 ET	Borre (yellow card) 67'; Quintero 68' (pen.); Borja (yellow card) 90+1'	Report	Gil 6'; Miazga (yellow card) 52'; Acosta (yellow card) 67'; Cropper (yellow card) 83'	Stadium: Estadio Metropolitano Roberto Meléndez; Referee: Cüneyt Çakır (Turkey)

March 29 Second leg	United States	1–2 (2–3 agg.)	Colombia	Frisco, Texas
20:30 CT	Rodriquez (yellow card) 21'; Parker (yellow card) 52'; Machado 57' (o.g.); Polster (yellow card) 58'; Gil (yellow card) 72' (yellow-red card) 77'; Miazga (red card) 90'		Machado (yellow card) 22'; R. Martínez 30', 64'; Celis (yellow card) 45'; Bonila (yellow card) 82'; Barrera (yellow card) 88'; Barrios (yellow card) 88'	Stadium: Toyota Stadium; Attendance: 7,998; Referee: Ravshan Irmatov (Uzbekistan)

==== U-20 ====
===== Friendlies =====
August 5	United States	2–0	(United States) New York Cosmos	Uniondale, New York
	Gutjahr 46'; Suarez 67'	Report		Stadium: New York Cosmos Training Facility; Attendance: 100

August 8	United States	4–3	(United States) New York Red Bulls II	Whippany, New Jersey
	Sabbi 36'; Lewis 37'; Elney 67'; Samuel (yellow card) 86'; Kelly 90+1'	Report	Abang 10'; Metzger 14'; Carroll (yellow card) 28'; Bonomo 46'	Stadium: New York Red Bull Training Facility; Attendance: 150

December 17	Costa Rica	0–4	United States	San Jose, Costa Rica
10:00 ET		Report		Stadium: Proyecto Goal; Attendance: 200

December 19	Costa Rica	0–0	United States	San Jose, Costa Rica
10:00 ET		Report

===== 2016 Dallas Cup =====
March 21	United States	1–0	(Mexico) CF Monterrey Rayados	Dallas, Texas
19:30 ET				Stadium: Cotton Bowl

March 21	United States	1–2	(England) Fulham F.C. Academy	Dallas, Texas
17:30 ET				Stadium: Richland College

March 23	United States	3–3	(Germany) TSG 1899 Hoffenheim	Dallas, Texas
ET				Stadium: Richland College

===== 2016 U-20 Men's NTC Invitational =====
June 29	United States	2–0	Costa Rica	Carson, California
21:00 ET	Williamson (yellow card) 7'; Ebobisse 9'; Acosta (yellow card) 54'; Trusty (yellow card) 55'; Herrera (yellow card) 67'; Saucedo 52' (yellow card) 89'	Report	Cordoba (yellow card) 32'; Sequeira (yellow card) 44'; Loria (yellow card) 63'; Juarez (yellow card) 75'; Carmona (yellow card) 87'	Stadium: Glenn "Mooch" Myernick Field 1 Referee: Randall Kelley (USA)

July 1	United States	4–0	Panama	Carson, California
21:00 ET	Trusty (yellow card) 10'; Young 43'; Acosta 56'; Ebobisse 58'; Craft 82'; Saucedo (yellow card) 89'	Report	Castillo (yellow card) 71'; Ávila (red card) 90'	Stadium: Glenn "Mooch" Myernick Field 1 Referee: (United States) Michael Radchuk

July 3	United States	2–1	Japan	Carson, California
18:00 ET	Saucedo 20'; Ebobisse 56'; Young (yellow card) 74'; Mansaray (yellow card) 90+3'	Report	Doan 6'; Ishimaru (yellow card) 25'; Ogawa (yellow card) 45'	Stadium: Glenn "Mooch" Myernick Field 1 Referee: (United States) Michael Radchuk

===== 2016 Four Nations Tournament =====
October 5	United States	0–1	Germany	Manchester, England
10:00 ET		Report		Stadium: Leigh Sports Village; Attendance: Closed Door; Referee: Robert Jones (England)

October 7	United States	3–5	Netherlands	Manchester, England
14:00 ET		Report		Stadium: Altrincham FC; Attendance: Closed Door; Referee: Ben Toner (England)

October 10	United States	0–2	England	Manchester, England
14:00ET		Report		Stadium: Rochdale FC; Attendance: 1,500; Referee: Oliver Langford (ENG)

==== U-19 ====
===== Friendlies =====
October 7	United States	0–1	(Mexico) Club Tijuana Xolos	Chula Vista, California
17:00 ET		Report		Stadium: Olympic Training Center

October 7	United States	4–0	(Mexico) Club Tijuana Xolos	Chula Vista, California
		Report		Stadium: Olympic Training Center

November 13	United States	5–0	(United States) Miami FC	Ft. Lauderdale, Florida
13:00 ET		Report		Stadium: Lockhart Stadium; Attendance: 200

===== Copa del Atlantico =====
February 2	Spain	1–0	United States	Las Palmas, Spain
1:30 ET	Olmo 37'	Report	Montalvo (yellow card) 90'; Dieterich (yellow card) 90+2'	Stadium: Estadio Municipal De Maspalomas; Attendance: 275; Referee: Juan Luis Pulido Santana (Spain)

February 3	United States	0–5	France	Las Palmas, Spain
11:00 ET		Report	Pelican 7' (pen.), 20'; Edouard 67', 72'; Javier 80'	Stadium: Campo Alfonso Silva; Attendance: 300; Referee: Alexis Carlos Pulido Santana

February 5	United States	0–1	Canary Islands	Las Palmas, Spain
11:00 ET		Report	Guillen (red card) 45+2'; Quintana 71'	Stadium: Campo Alfonso Silva; Attendance: 450; Referee: Ruben Jimenez Gonzalez

===== 2016 Slovakia Cup =====
April 25	United States	5–1	Georgia	Modranka, Slovakia
4:00 ET		Report

April 26	United States	2–1	Ukraine	Bernolákovo, Slovakia
9:00 ET		Report

April 28	United States	1–3	Slovakia	Senica, Slovakia
4:00 ET		Report

April 29	United States	2–1	Russia	Senica, Slovakia
5:00 ET				Stadium: FK Senica Stadium

===== 33rd International U-20 Men's COTIF Tournament =====
July 26	United States	0–2	Venezuela	Valencia, Spain

July 28	United States	1–0	Mauritania	Valencia, Spain

July 29	United States	1–0	Spain	Valencia, Spain

August 1	United States	1–3	Bahrain	Valencia, Spain

===== Stevan-Vilotic Cele tournament =====
September 1	United States	1–2	Serbia	Subotica, Serbia
11:00 ET				Stadium: City Stadium

September 2	United States	0–2	France	Senta, Serbia
11:00 ET				Stadium: Senta Stadium

==== U-18 ====
===== Friendlies =====
March 12	United States	2–1	(Argentina) San Lorenzo	Buenos Aires, Argentina
		Report		Stadium: Instalaciones de Club Atletico San Lorenzo de Almagro

March 14	United States	3–2	(Argentina) Racing Club	Buenos Aires, Argentina
		Report		Stadium: Polideportivo de Racing Club

March 16	United States	2–1	Uruguay	Buenos Aires, Argentina
		Report		Stadium: Polideportivo de Racing Club

April 26	United States	2–1	(Mexico) Tijuana	Chula Vista, California
		Report		Stadium: Olympic Training Center

April 29	United States	0–0	(United States) San Diego Nomads	Chula Vista, California
10:30 PT		Report		Stadium: Olympic Training Center

Chivas (Mexico)	0–4	United States	Mexico

Universidad de Guadalajara (Mexico)	1–4	United States	Mexico

Atlas (Mexico)	0–1	United States	Mexico

November 13	United States	2–2	(United States) South Florida Surf	Fort Lauderdale, Florida
15:00 ET		Report		Stadium: Lockhart Stadium; Attendance: 50; Referee: Rubiel Vazquez

===== Václav Ježek Tournament =====
August 16	United States	3–1	Slovakia	Plzeň, Czech Republic

August 17	United States	3–1	Hungary	Plzeň, Czech Republic

August 19	United States	5–3	Russia	Plzeň, Czech Republic

August 21	United States	4–2	Czech Republic	Plzeň, Czech Republic

==== U-17 ====
===== Friendlies =====
April 15	United States	3–1	Canada	Fort Lauderdale, Florida
11:00 ET		Report		Stadium: Lockhart Stadium

April 17	United States	3–1	Canada	Fort Lauderdale, Florida
7:30 ET		Report		Stadium: Lockhart Stadium

August 16	United States	4–3	(United States) Utah Valley University	Park City, Utah

August 20	United States	v	(United States) RSL Monarchs	Park City, Utah

September 15	United States	8–0	Guatemala	Bradenton, Florida

September 17	United States	9–0	Guatemala	Lakewood Ranch, Florida

September 27	Panama	1–3	United States	Panama City, Panama
		Report

October 1	Panama	2–0	United States	Panama City, Panama
		Report

October 8	United States	1–1 (a.e.t.) (4–5 p)	(United States) Saint Louis FC U-18	Fenton, Missouri
20:30 ET				Stadium: World Wide Technology Soccer Park

October 22	United States	3–1	Costa Rica	Bradenton, Florida
		Report		Stadium: IMG Academy Stadium

October 24	United States	4–0	Costa Rica	Bradenton, Florida
		Report		Stadium: IMG Academy Field 11

November 2	Jamaica	0–3	United States	Kingston, Jamaica
		Report

November 6	Jamaica	0–4	United States	Kingston, Jamaica
		Report

December 14	United States	2–1	(United States) Baltimore Armour 18DA	Bradenton, Florida
11:30 ET		Report		Stadium: IMG Academy

December 15	United States	5–0	(United States) RVG Academy	Bradenton, Florida
11:30 ET		Report		Stadium: IMG Academy

December 17	United States	1–3	(England) Tottenham FC	Bradenton, Florida
		Report		Stadium: IMG Academy

===== Aegean Cup =====
January 18 Group stage	United States	0–1	Romania	İzmir, Turkey
7:00 ET		Report	Sefer 2'	Stadium: Seluk Stadium; Referee: Murat Izzet Kocaman (Turkey)
Note: 80-minute match

January 19 Group stage	United States	2–1	Greece	İzmir, Turkey
7:00 ET	Vaughn (yellow card) 10' (yellow-red card) 73'; Carleton 46'; Acosta (yellow card) 57'; Temple 66'; Vasquez (yellow card) 70'	Report	Voutsas (yellow card) 5'; Gkargkalatzidis 67'; Styllektis (yellow card) 80'	Stadium: Seluk Stadium; Referee: Eren Ozyemiscioglu
Note: 80-minute match

January 21 Group stage	United States	2–0	Belgium	İzmir, Turkey
7:30 ET	Carleton 23', (yellow card) 46'; Sargent 73'	Report	Evenepoel (yellow card) 44'; Bertaccini (yellow card) 64'	Stadium: Seluk Stadium; Referee: Ferhan Kestanlioglu
Note: 80-minute match

January 23 Final	Turkey	3–1	United States	İzmir, Turkey
7:30 ET	Karaahmet 19'; Ilkin 24'; Gul 50'	Report	Villegas 76'	Stadium: Mumin Ozkasap; Referee: Feridun Daldas
Note: 80-minute match

===== 2016 Mondial Football De Montaigu =====
March 22	United States	1–1	Brazil	Le Poiré-sur-Vie, France
14:00 ET

March 24	United States	2–2	England	Le Poiré-sur-Vie, France
14:00 ET

March 26	United States	4–0	Russia	Bretignolles-sur-Mer, France
12:00 ET

March 28	United States	3–2	France	Montaigu, France
		Report		Stadium: Stade Maxime Bossis

===== 2016 AIFF Youth Cup India =====
May 15	United States	1–1	Tanzania	Goa, India

May 19	United States	4–0	India	Goa, India

May 21	United States	0–0	South Korea	Goa, India
12:00 ET

May 23	United States	2–1	Malaysia	Goa, India

May 25	United States	1–1 (a.e.t.) (0–1 p)	South Korea	Goa, India

===== 2016 Torneo Naciones de Mexico =====
August 25	United States	3–3	Portugal	Mexico City, Mexico

August 26	United States	2–1	Qatar	Mexico City, Mexico

August 28	United States	3–6	Mexico	Mexico City, Mexico

===== 2016 Nike International Friendlies =====
November 30	United States	7–1	Portugal	Lakewood Ranch, Florida
19:00 ET		Report		Stadium: Premier Sports Campus; Referee: Farhad Dadkho (United States)

December 2	United States	5–1	Turkey	Lakewood Ranch, Florida
19:00 ET		Report		Stadium: Premier Sports Campus; Attendance: 3,933; Referee: Michael Radchuk (United States)

December 4	United States	3–0	Brazil	Lakewood Ranch, Florida
17:00 ET		Report		Stadium: Premier Sports Campus; Attendance: 4,072; Referee: Michael Radchuk (United States)

==== U-16 ====
===== Friendlies =====
February 23	England	1–1	United States	England
		Report

February 25	England	4–2	United States	England
		Report

===== 2016 tournament delle nazioni =====
April 25	United States	1–2	Croatia	Gradisca, Italy
10:00 ET		Report

April 26	United States	2–2	Slovenia	Gradisca, Italy
10:00 ET		report

April 27	United States	2–1	Brazil	Gradisca, Italy
11:00 ET		Report

April 30	United States	4–4 (a.e.t.) (6–5 p)	England	Gradisca, Italy
		Report

May 1	United States	0–4	Italy	Gradisca, Italy

===== 2016 Val-De-Marne Tournament =====
October 25	United States	2–1	England	Villejuif, France
9:30 ET		Report		Stadium: Stade Louis Dolly

October 27	United States	0–3	Russia	Bonneuil-sur-Marne, France
9:30 ET		Report		Stadium: Complexe Sportif Leo Lagrange

October 29	United States	0–2	France	Le Plessis-Trévise, France
9:30 ET		Report		Stadium: Complexe Sportif Philippe Dieuleveult

==== U-15 ====
===== Friendlies =====
November 8	United States	2–1	Chargers Soccer Club	Lakewood Ranch, Florida
16:00 ET		Report		Stadium: Premier Sports Complex

November 8	United States	7–0	Weston FC	Lakewood Ranch, Florida
18:00 ET		Report		Stadium: Premier Sports Complex

===== 2016 International Festival =====
April 4	United States	5–1	Club Atletico Talleres	Rosario, Argentina
14:00 ET		Report		Stadium: Polideportivo Bella Vista

April 6	United States	2–2	Newell's Old Boys	Rosario, Argentina
15:00 ET		Report		Stadium: Polideportivo Bella Vista

April 8	United States	2–0	Uruguay	Rosario, Argentina
13:30 ET		Report		Stadium: Polideportivo Bella Vista

===== Four Team International Tournament =====
June 2	United States	1–0	Montenegro	Zagreb, Croatia
		Report		Stadium: NK Spansko Field

June 3	United States	1–2	Croatia	Zagreb, Croatia
		Report		Stadium: NK Spansko Field

June 5	United States	0–2	Serbia	Zagreb, Croatia
		Report		Stadium: NK Spansko Field

==== Futsal ====
===== 2016 CONCACAF Futsal Championship qualification =====
May 4	Canada	4–4	United States	BN Arena, San José
20:00	Ian Bennett 30'; Matias Dimarco 36'; Nazim Belguendouz 37'; Jacob Orellana 38'	Report	Franck Tayou 20'; Patrick Healy 28'; Nelson Santana 29'; Daniel Mattos 40'

May 5	United States	3–5	Canada	BN Arena, San José
20:00	Adriano Dos Santos 15'; Tony Donatelli 38'; Daniel Mattos 39'	Report	Robert Renaud 14', 17', 29'; Brian Harris 22' (o.g.); Ian Bennett 25'

==== Beach Soccer ====
===== 2016 Beach Soccer Intercontinental Cup =====
November 1	United States	2–6	Iran	Dubai, United Arab Emirates
10:45 ET		Report		Referee: Ebrahim Al Mansory (UAE)

November 2	United States	3–9	Russia	Dubai, United Arab Emirates
11:00 ET		Report		Attendance: 1,754; Referee: Ahmed Salamy (UAE)

November 3	United States	3–5	Egypt	Dubai, United Arab Emirates
8:15 ET		Report		Attendance: 385; Referee: Ebrahim Al Mansory (UAE)

==== Paralympic: 7-a-side ====
===== 2016 Paralympic Games =====
====== Group B ======
Pos	Team	Pld	W	D	L	GF	GA	GD	Pts	Qualification
1	Iran	3	3	0	0	7	1	+6	9	Semi finals
2	Netherlands	3	1	1	1	4	4	0	4	Semi finals
3	Argentina	3	1	0	2	4	7	−3	3	5th–6th place match
4	United States	3	0	1	2	4	7	−3	1	7th–8th place match

Source: Paralympic.org

September 8 Group	United States	2–2	Netherlands	Rio de Janeiro, Brazil
18:00 ET		Report		Stadium: Deodoro Stadium; Attendance: 2,300; Referee: Ross Haswell

September 10 Group	United States	0–2	Iran	Rio de Janeiro, Brazil
15:00 ET		Report		Stadium: Deodoro Stadium; Attendance: 10,000; Referee: Ross Haswell

September 12 Group	United States	2–3	Argentina	Rio de Janeiro, Brazil
13:00 ET				Stadium: Deodoro Stadium

September 14 Group	United States	2–3	(Republic of Ireland) Ireland	Rio de Janeiro, Brazil
13:00 ET				Stadium: Deodoro Stadium

=== Women ===
==== Senior ====
Wins	Losses	Draws
22	0	3

===== Friendlies =====
January 23	United States	5–0	Republic of Ireland	San Diego, California
14:00 PT	Lloyd 6', 21', 28'; Morgan 45'; Pugh 83'	Report		Stadium: Qualcomm Stadium; Attendance: 23,309; Referee: Karen Abt (United States)

April 6	United States	7–0	Colombia	East Hartford, Connecticut
19:30 ET	Dunn 27'; Long 32', 65'; Pugh 33'; Lloyd 39'; Heath 62'; Press 74'	Report		Stadium: Pratt & Whitney Stadium; Attendance: 21,792; Referee: Marie-Soleil Beaudoin (Canada)

April 10	United States	3–0	Colombia	Chester, Pennsylvania
14:00 ET	Press 26'; Johnston 42', 79'	Report		Stadium: Talen Energy Stadium; Attendance: 17,275; Referee: Margaret Domka (United States)

June 2	United States	3–3	Japan	Commerce City, Colorado
19:00 ET	Morgan 27', 64'; Horan 89'	Report	Iwabuchi 14'; Ogimi 22' (yellow card) 39' (yellow-red card) 57'; Kumagai (yellow card) 63'; Yokoyama 90+3'	Stadium: Dick's Sporting Goods Park; Attendance: 18,572; Referee: Margaret Domka (United States)

June 5	United States	2–0	Japan	Cleveland, Ohio
12:30 ET	Johnston 27'; Morgan 62'	Report		Stadium: FirstEnergy Stadium; Attendance: 23,535; Referee: Marianela Cruz (Costa Rica)

July 9	United States	1–0	South Africa	Chicago, Illinois
12:00 CT	Dunn 35'	Report		Stadium: Soldier Field; Attendance: 19,272; Referee: Maria Serpas (El Salvador)

July 22	United States	4–0	Costa Rica	Kansas City, Kansas
20:00 CT	Dunn 15'; Pugh 22'; Long (yellow card) 24'; Lloyd 45+6'; Press 79'	Report	Alvarado (yellow card) 10'; Villalobos (yellow card) 28'	Stadium: Children's Mercy Park; Attendance: 12,635; Referee: Ekaterina Koroleva (United States)

September 15	United States	9–0	Thailand	Columbus, Ohio
20:00 ET	Lloyd 1', 60', 81'; Press 4'; O'Reilly 5'; Heath 36'; Dunn 70'; Morgan 86', 90+2'	Report		Stadium: Mapfre Stadium; Attendance: 10,490; Referee: Christina Unkel (United States)

September 18	United States	3–1	Netherlands	Atlanta, Georgia
19:00 ET	Lloyd 35' van den Berg 50' (o.g.); Long 77'	Report	van de Sanden 2'	Stadium: Georgia Dome; Attendance: 15,652; Referee: Crystal Sobers (Trinidad and Tobago)

October 19	United States	4–0	Switzerland	Sandy, Utah
21:00 ET	Williams 46'; Heath 61'; Press 69'; Mewis 76'	Report		Stadium: Rio Tinto Stadium; Attendance: 14,336; Referee: Melissa Borjas Pastrana (Honduras)

October 23	United States	5–1	Switzerland	Minneapolis, Minnesota
13:45 ET	Lloyd 25', 51'; Press 53'; Dunn 63'; Ohai 82'	Report	Mauron 7'	Stadium: U.S. Bank Stadium; Attendance: 23,400; Referee: Margaret Domka (United States)

November 10	United States	8–1	Romania	San Jose, California
22:00 ET	Press 8', 34', 38'; Heath 10'; Brian 25'; Morgan 52', 75'; Ficzay 90+2' (o.g.)	Report	Rus 31'	Stadium: Avaya Stadium; Attendance: 16,425; Referee: Ekaterina Koroleva (United States)

November 13	United States	5–0	Romania	Carson, California
21:30 ET	Meluta 20' (o.g.); Dunn 45+1'; Press 55'; Brian 88' (pen.); Mewis 90+1'	Report		Stadium: StubHub Center; Attendance: 20,336; Referee: Margaret Domka (United States)

===== Olympic qualifying =====
February 10 Group stage	United States	5–0	Costa Rica	Frisco, Texas
19:30 CT	Morgan 1', 62'; Lloyd 9' (pen.); Dunn 15'; Press 83'	Report		Stadium: Toyota Stadium; Attendance: 8,143; Referee: Cardella Samuels (Jamaica)

February 13 Group stage	Mexico	0–1	United States	Frisco, Texas
15:00 CT		Report	Lloyd 80'	Stadium: Toyota Stadium; Attendance: 15,032; Referee: Melissa Borjas (Honduras)

February 15 Group stage	United States	10–0	Puerto Rico	Frisco, Texas
19:30 CT	Dunn 6', 21', 56', 82', 84'; Lloyd 18' (pen.); O'Hara 45'; Rivera 55' (o.g.); Press 57'; Mewis 88'	Report		Stadium: Toyota Stadium; Attendance: 7,658; Referee: Crystal Sobers (Trinidad and Tobago)

February 19 Semi-final	United States	5–0	Trinidad and Tobago	Houston, Texas
19:30 CT	Heath 12'; Morgan 30', 71', 73'; Lloyd 43'	Report		Stadium: BBVA Compass Stadium; Attendance: 5,561; Referee: Tatiana Guzman (Nicaragua)

February 21 Final	Canada	0–2	United States	Houston, Texas
16:00 CT		Report	Horan 53'; Heath 61'	Stadium: BBVA Compass Stadium; Attendance: 10,119; Referee: Quetzalli Alvarado (Mexico)

===== SheBelieves Cup =====
March 3	United States	1–0	England	Tampa, Florida
19:30 ET	Dunn 72'	Report		Stadium: Raymond James Stadium; Attendance: 13,027; Referee: Tatiana Alguera (Nicaragua)

March 6	United States	1–0	France	Nashville, Tennessee
14:00 CT	Morgan 90+1'	Report		Stadium: Nissan Stadium; Attendance: 25,363; Referee: Alondra Arellano Sandoval (Mexico)

March 9	United States	2–1	Germany	Boca Raton, Florida
19:30 ET	Morgan 37'; Mewis 42'	Report	Mittag 30'	Stadium: FAU Stadium; Attendance: 13,501; Referee: Carol Chenard (Canada)

===== 2016 Summer Olympics =====
August 3 Group G	United States	2–0	New Zealand	Belo Horizonte, Brazil
18:00 ET	Lloyd 9'; Morgan 46'	Report		Stadium: Mineirão; Attendance: 9,556; Referee: Kateryna Monzul (Ukraine)

August 6 Group G	United States	1–0	France	Belo Horizonte, Brazil
16:00 ET	Lloyd 64'	Report		Stadium: Mineirão; Attendance: 11,782; Referee: Claudia Umpierrez (Uruguay)

August 9 Group G	Colombia	2–2	United States	Manaus, Brazil
17:00 ET	Usme 26', 90'	Report	Dunn 41'; Pugh 59'	Stadium: Arena da Amazônia; Referee: Teodora Albon (Romania)

August 12 Olympics QF	United States	1–1 (a.e.t.) (3–4 p)	Sweden	Brasília, Brazil
12:00 ET	Morgan 77'	Report	Blackstenius 61'	Stadium: Estádio Nacional Mané Garrincha; Attendance: 13,892; Referee: Anna-Marie Keighley (New Zealand)
	Penalties
	Morgan (penalty missed); Horan (penalty scored); Lloyd (penalty scored); Brian (penalty scored); Press (penalty missed)		(penalty scored) Schelin; (penalty scored) Asllani; (penalty missed) Sembrant; (penalty scored) Seger; (penalty scored) Dahlkvist

====== Group G ======
Pos	Team	Pld	W	D	L	GF	GA	GD	Pts	Qualification
1	United States	3	2	1	0	5	2	+3	7	Quarter-finals
2	France	3	2	0	1	7	1	+6	6	Quarter-finals
3	New Zealand	3	1	0	2	1	5	−4	3	
4	Colombia	3	0	1	2	2	7	−5	1	

Source: Rio2016 & FIFA
Rules for classification: Tiebreakers

====== Quarter-final ======
12 August 2016
13:00

United States	1–1 (a.e.t.)	Sweden
Morgan 77'	Report (Rio2016); Report (FIFA); Report	Blackstenius 61'
Penalties
Morgan (penalty missed); Horan (penalty scored); Lloyd (penalty scored); Brian (penalty scored); Press (penalty missed)	3–4	(penalty scored) Schelin; (penalty scored) Asllani; (penalty missed) Sembrant; (penalty scored) Seger; (penalty scored) Dahlkvist

Estádio Nacional Mané Garrincha, Brasília
Attendance: 13,892
Referee: Anna-Marie Keighley (New Zealand)

===== Goalscorers =====
Goals are current as of November 13, 2016 after match against Romania.

Player	Goals
Carli Lloyd	17
Alex Morgan	17
Crystal Dunn	14
Christen Press	12
Tobin Heath	6
Mallory Pugh	4
Sam Mewis	4
Allie Long	3
Julie Ertz	3
Lindsey Horan	2
Morgan Brian	2
Kelley O'Hara	1
Heather O'Reilly	1
Lynn Williams	1
Kealia Ohai	1
Own Goals	4

==== U-23 ====
===== Friendlies =====
January 25	United States	3–0	Republic of Ireland	Carson, California
11:00 PT	Gibbons 19', 42'; Payne 39'	Report		Stadium: StubHub Center Field #4; Referee: Israel Fernandez (United States)

===== Istria Cup =====
March 2	United States	3–0	Slovenia	Umag, Croatia
	Groom 11'; Taylor Smith 79'; Sullivan 87'	Report		Stadium: Dajla Stadium

March 4	United States	0–0	Poland	Umag, Croatia

March 6	United States	2–0	France B	Umag, Croatia

===== U-23 Nordic Tournament =====
June 2	United States	3–1	Sweden	Birmingham, England
				Stadium: St. Georges Park

June 4	United States	2–1	Norway	Birmingham, England
				Stadium: St. Georges Park

June 7	United States	1–1 (a.e.t.) (2–4 p)	England	Birmingham, England
		Report		Stadium: St. Georges Park

==== U-20 ====
===== Friendlies =====
May 27	United States	0–5	Japan	Port Moresby, Papua New Guinea

May 30	Papua New Guinea	0–10	United States	Port Moresby, Papua New Guinea
		Report

October 8	United States	6–2	Venezuela	Orlando, Florida
16:00 ET		Report		Stadium: Omni Hotel & Resort at ChampionsGate

October 10	United States	5–1	Venezuela	Orlando, Florida
16:00ET		Report		Stadium: Omni Hotel & Resort at ChampionsGate

===== 2016 U-23 La Manga Tournament =====
March 2 Group stage	United States	1–1	Sweden	La Manga, Spain
9:00ET	Harvey 44'	Report		Stadium: Field B

March 4 Group stage	United States	1–0	England	La Manga, Spain
7:00 ET	Watt 87'	Report		Stadium: Field G Referee: Cathrine Eide

March 6 Group stage	United States	2–0	Norway	La Manga, Spain
9:00 ET	Roberts /Watt

===== 2016 U-20 NTC Invitational =====
September 14	United States	0–0	South Korea	Carson, California
22:00 ET		Report		Stadium: Glenn "Mooch" Myernick Field

September 16	United States	0–1	England	Carson, California
22:00 ET		Report		Stadium: Glenn "Mooch" Myernick Field

September 18	United States	0–2	Brazil	Carson, California
19:00 ET		Report		Stadium: Glenn "Mooch" Myernick Field

===== FIFA U-20 World Cup =====
====== Group C ======
Pos	Team	Pld	W	D	L	GF	GA	GD	Pts	Qualification
1	United States	3	1	2	0	4	2	+2	5 (Note: United States finished ahead of France based on fair play points.)	Knockout stage
2	France	3	1	2	0	4	2	+2	5	Knockout stage
3	New Zealand	3	1	0	2	2	5	−3	3	
4	Ghana	3	0	2	1	3	4	−1	2	

Source: FIFA
Notes:

November 14 Group stage	France	0–0	United States	Port Moresby, Papua New Guinea
01:00 ET		Report		Stadium: PNG Football Stadium; Attendance: 2,033; Referee: Casey Reibelt (Australia)

November 17 Group stage	New Zealand	1–3	United States	Port Moresby, Papua New Guinea
04:00 ET	Coombes 76'	Report	Sanchez 3'; Pugh 8'; Watt 82'	Stadium: PNG Football Stadium; Attendance: 2,399; Referee: Thérèse Neguel (Cameroon)

November 21 Group stage	United States	1–1	Ghana	Port Moresby, Papua New Guinea
01:00 ET	Pugh 22'	Report	Murphy 20' (o.g.)	Stadium: Sir John Guise Stadium; Attendance: 3076; Referee: Sara Persson (Sweden)

November 25 QF	United States	2–1	Mexico	Port Moresby, Papua New Guinea
01:00 ET	Watt 80'; Hedge 90+2'	Report	Sanchez 66'	Stadium: Sir John Guise Stadium; Attendance: 4,245; Referee: Riem Hussein (Germany)

November 29 SF	North Korea	2–1	United States	Port Moresby, Papua New Guinea
01:00 ET		Report	Jacobs 89'	Stadium: Sir John Guise Stadium; Attendance: 5,037; Referee: Katalin Kulcsár (Hungary)

December 3 3rd Place	United States	0–1	Japan	Port Moresby, Papua New Guinea
01:00 ET		Report		Stadium: National Football Stadium; Attendance: 8.093; Referee: Liang Qin (China)

==== U-19 ====
===== Friendlies =====
June 14	New Zealand (Reserves)	1–2	United States	Auckland, New Zealand

June 17	New Zealand	4–4	United States	Auckland, New Zealand
		Report

June 19	New Zealand	1–4	United States	Auckland, New Zealand
		Report

==== U-18 ====
===== Friendlies =====
July 13	England	1–0	United States	Burton upon Trent, England
		Report		Stadium: St. George's Park

July 14	England	2–2	United States	Burton upon Trent, England
		Report		Stadium: St. George's Park

===== 2016 U-20 La Manga Tournament =====
March 3 Group stage	United States	0–0	Denmark	Cartagena, Spain
9:00ET		Report		Stadium: La Manga Club Resort

March 5 Group stage	United States	1–0	England	La Manga, Spain
12:00 ET

March 7 Group stage	United States	1–0	Norway	La Manga, Spain
12:00 ET	kim 36'	Report		Stadium: La Manga Club Resort; Referee: Malin Johansson (SWE)

===== 2016 International Cup =====
October 18	United States	1–2	England	Ballymena, Northern Ireland
7:00 ET		Report		Stadium: Ballymena Showgrounds

October 20	United States	3–1	France	Lurgan, Northern Ireland
7:00 ET		Report		Stadium: Mourneview Park

October 23	United States	3–0	Northern Ireland	Belfast, Northern Ireland
11:30 ET		Report		Stadium: Windsor Park

==== U-17 ====
===== Friendlies =====
May 31	Switzerland	2–3	United States	Lugano, Switzerland
		Report

June 2	Switzerland	1–2	United States	Lugano, Switzerland
		Report

August 9	United States	2–2	Brazil	East Lansing, Michigan
18:00 ET		Report		Stadium: DeMartin Soccer Stadium; Attendance: 2,250

August 12	United States	1–1	Brazil	Holland, Michigan
19:00 ET		Report		Stadium: Van Andel Soccer Stadium; Attendance: 2,278

August 30	United States	4–0	Venezuela	Tampa, Florida
19:00 ET				Stadium: Water Soccer Complex

September 2	United States	5–1	Venezuela	Lakewood Ranch, Florida
19:00 ET				Stadium: Premier Sports Campus

===== U-17 Women's NTC Invitational =====
February 11	United States	2–0	England	Carson, California
18:00 PT	Kuhlmann 82', 87'	Report		Stadium: Glenn "Mooch" Myernick Field

February 13	United States	2–0	South Korea	Carson, California
18:00 PT	Sophia Smith 13'; Rodriguez 25'	Report		Stadium: Glenn "Mooch" Myernick Field

February 15	United States	2–1	Japan	Carson, California
15:00 PT				Stadium: Glenn "Mooch" Myernick Field

===== CONCACAF Women's U-17 Championship =====
====== Group B ======
Pos	Team	Pld	W	D	L	GF	GA	GD	Pts	Qualification
1	United States	3	3	0	0	11	1	+10	9	Knockout stage
2	Mexico	3	2	0	1	5	3	+2	6	Knockout stage
3	Costa Rica	3	1	0	2	5	8	−3	3	
4	Jamaica	3	0	0	3	3	12	−9	0	

Source: CONCACAF

March 4 Group stage	Jamaica	1–8	United States	St. George's, Grenada
14:30 ET		Report	Kuhlmann 15', 49'; Sanchez 34', 56'; Tagliaferri 72', 75', 81', 88'	Stadium: Grenada National Stadium; Referee: Tatiana Montes (PAN)

March 6 Group stage	United States	1–0	Mexico	St. George's, Grenada
14:30 ET	Sanchez 73'	Report		Stadium: Grenada National Stadium; Referee: Marie-Soleil Beaudoin (CAN)

March 8 Group stage	United States	2–0	Costa Rica	St. George's, Grenada
12:00 ET				Stadium: Grenada National Stadium

March 11 Semi-Final	United States	5–0	Canada	St. George's, Grenada
16:00 ET				Stadium: Grenada Athletic Stadium

March 13 Final	Mexico	1–2	United States	St. George's, Grenada
17:00 ET		Report		Stadium: Grenada Athletic Stadium; Attendance: 2,500; Referee: Marie-Soleil Beaudoin (Canada)

===== 2016 FIFA U-17 Women's World Cup =====
====== Group D ======
Pos	Team	Pld	W	D	L	GF	GA	GD	Pts	Qualification
1	Japan	3	3	0	0	13	2	+11	9	Knockout stage
2	Ghana	3	2	0	1	3	6	−3	6	Knockout stage
3	United States	3	1	0	2	9	6	+3	3	
4	Paraguay	3	0	0	3	1	12	−11	0	

Source: FIFA

October 1 Group Stage D	United States	6–1	Paraguay	Zarqa, Jordan
9:00ET	Tagliaferri 11'; Kuhlmann 14', 49', 87'; Pickett 69'; Sanchez 82'	Report	Fretes 53'	Stadium: Prince Mohammed Stadium; Attendance: 2,078; Referee: Anastasia Pustovoitova (Russia)

October 4 Group Stage D	United States	1–2	Ghana	Amman, Jordan
9:00ET	Tagliaferri 5'	Report	Gi. Acheampong 63'; Owusu-Ansah 84' (pen.)	Stadium: King Abdullah Stadium; Attendance: 2,000; Referee: Laura Fortunato (Argentina)

October 8 Group Stage D	Japan	3–2	United States	Amman, Jordan
11:00ET				Stadium: Amman International Stadium

==== U-16 ====
===== 2016 delle Nazioni Tournament =====
April 25	United States	0–1	Italy	Gradisca d'Isonzo, Italy
		Report

April 26	United States	6–0	Iran	Gradisca d'Isonzo, Italy
		Report

April 28	United States	1–1 (a.e.t.) (1–4 p)	Mexico	Gradisca d'Isonzo, Italy
12:00 ET

==== U-15 ====
===== 2016 CONCACAF U-15 Championship =====
====== Group A ======
Pos	Team	Pld	W	D	L	GF	GA	GD	Pts	Qualification
1	United States (H)	4	4	0	0	30	0	+30	12	Knockout stage
2	Mexico	4	3	0	1	23	1	+22	9	Knockout stage
3	Haiti	4	2	0	2	10	3	+7	6	
4	Trinidad and Tobago	4	1	0	3	4	38	−34	3	
5	Dominican Republic	4	0	0	4	0	24	−24	0	

Source: CONCACAF
Rules for classification: Tiebreakers
(H) Hosts

August 9 Group	United States	22–0	Trinidad and Tobago	Orlando, Florida
9:00 ET		Report		Stadium: ESPN Wide World of Sports Complex at Disney

August 10 Group	Mexico	0–1	United States	Orlando, Florida
9:00 ET		Report		Stadium: ESPN Wide World of Sports Complex at Disney

August 12 Group	United States	1–0	Haiti	Orlando, Florida
11:00 ET		Report		Stadium: ESPN Wide World of Sports Complex at Disney

August 13 Group	Dominican Republic	0–6	United States	Orlando, Florida
11:00 ET		Report		Stadium: ESPN Wide World of Sports Complex at Disney

August 17 QF	United States	12–0	Bermuda	Orlando, Florida
11:00 ET		Report		Stadium: ESPN Wide World of Sports Complex at Disney

August 19 SF	United States	5–0	Costa Rica	Orlando, Florida
9:00 ET				Stadium: ESPN Wide World of Sports Complex at Disney

August 21 Final	United States	2–0	Canada	Orlando, Florida
11:00 ET		Report		Stadium: ESPN Wide World of Sports Complex at Disney

== Club competitions ==
=== Men's ===
==== League competitions ====
===== Major League Soccer =====
====== Conference tables ======
Eastern Conference

Pos	Team	Pld	W	L	T	GF	GA	GD	Pts	Qualification
1	New York Red Bulls	34	16	9	9	61	44	+17	57	MLS Cup Conference Semifinals
2	New York City FC	34	15	10	9	62	57	+5	54	MLS Cup Conference Semifinals
3	Toronto FC	34	14	9	11	51	39	+12	53	MLS Cup Knockout Round
4	D.C. United	34	11	10	13	53	47	+6	46	MLS Cup Knockout Round
5	Montreal Impact	34	11	11	12	49	53	−4	45	MLS Cup Knockout Round
6	Philadelphia Union	34	11	14	9	52	55	−3	42	MLS Cup Knockout Round
7	New England Revolution	34	11	14	9	44	54	−10	42	
8	Orlando City SC	34	9	11	14	55	60	−5	41	
9	Columbus Crew SC	34	8	14	12	50	58	−8	36	
10	Chicago Fire	34	7	17	10	42	58	−16	31	

Source: MLS

Western Conference

Pos	Team	Pld	W	L	T	GF	GA	GD	Pts	Qualification
1	FC Dallas	34	17	8	9	50	40	+10	60	MLS Cup Conference Semifinals
2	Colorado Rapids	34	15	6	13	39	32	+7	58	MLS Cup Conference Semifinals
3	LA Galaxy	34	12	6	16	54	39	+15	52	MLS Cup Knockout Round
4	Seattle Sounders FC	34	14	14	6	44	43	+1	48	MLS Cup Knockout Round
5	Sporting Kansas City	34	13	13	8	42	41	+1	47	MLS Cup Knockout Round
6	Real Salt Lake	34	12	12	10	44	46	−2	46	MLS Cup Knockout Round
7	Portland Timbers	34	12	14	8	48	53	−5	44	
8	Vancouver Whitecaps FC	34	10	15	9	45	52	−7	39	
9	San Jose Earthquakes	34	8	12	14	32	40	−8	38	
10	Houston Dynamo	34	7	14	13	39	45	−6	34	

Source: MLS

====== Overall table ======
Note: the table below has no impact on playoff qualification and is used solely for determining host of the MLS Cup, certain CCL spots, the Supporters' Shield trophy, seeding in the 2017 Canadian Championship, and 2017 MLS draft. The conference tables are the sole determinant for teams qualifying for the playoffs.

Pos	Team	Pld	W	L	T	GF	GA	GD	Pts	Qualification
1	FC Dallas (S)	34	17	8	9	50	40	+10	60	CONCACAF Champions League
2	Colorado Rapids	34	15	6	13	39	32	+7	58	CONCACAF Champions League
3	New York Red Bulls	34	16	9	9	61	44	+17	57	CONCACAF Champions League
4	New York City FC	34	15	10	9	62	57	+5	54	
5	Toronto FC	34	14	9	11	51	39	+12	53	CONCACAF Champions League
6	LA Galaxy	34	12	6	16	54	39	+15	52	
7	Seattle Sounders FC (C)	34	14	14	6	44	43	+1	48	CONCACAF Champions League
8	Sporting Kansas City	34	13	13	8	42	41	+1	47	
9	Real Salt Lake	34	12	12	10	44	46	−2	46	
10	D.C. United	34	11	10	13	53	47	+6	46	
11	Montreal Impact	34	11	11	12	49	53	−4	45	
12	Portland Timbers	34	12	14	8	48	53	−5	44	
13	Philadelphia Union	34	11	14	9	52	55	−3	42	
14	New England Revolution	34	11	14	9	44	54	−10	42	
15	Orlando City SC	34	9	11	14	55	60	−5	41	
16	Vancouver Whitecaps FC	34	10	15	9	45	52	−7	39	
17	San Jose Earthquakes	34	8	12	14	32	40	−8	38	
18	Columbus Crew SC	34	8	14	12	50	58	−8	36	
19	Houston Dynamo	34	7	14	13	39	45	−6	34	
20	Chicago Fire	34	7	17	10	42	58	−16	31	

Source: MLS
Rules for classification: 1) points; 2) total wins; 3) total goal differential; 4) total goals scored;
(C) MLS Cup Champion; (S) Supporters' Shield

====== MLS Playoffs ======
Knockout round	Conference semifinals
E5	Montreal Impact	1	2	3
October 27 – Washington, D.C.
E1	New York Red Bulls	0	1	1
E4	D.C. United	2
E5	Montreal Impact	4
Eastern Conference
E3	Toronto FC	2	5	7
October 26 – Toronto, Ontario
E2	New York City FC	0	0	0
E3	Toronto FC	3
E6	Philadelphia Union	1
W4	Seattle Sounders FC	3	1	4
October 27 – Seattle, Washington
W1	FC Dallas	0	2	2
W4	Seattle Sounders FC	1
W5	Sporting Kansas City	0
Western Conference
W3	LA Galaxy	1	0	1 (1)
October 26 – Carson, California
W2	Colorado Rapids (p)	0	1	1 (3)
W3	LA Galaxy	3
W6	Real Salt Lake	1

Conference finals
E5	Montreal Impact	3	2	5
E3	Toronto FC (a.e.t.)	2	5	7
W4	Seattle Sounders FC	2	1	3
W2	Colorado Rapids	1	0	1

MLS Cup; December 10 – Toronto, Ontario
E3	Toronto FC	0 (4)
W4	Seattle Sounders FC (p)	0 (5)

===== North American Soccer League =====
====== Spring Season ======
Pos	Team	Pld	W	D	L	GF	GA	GD	Pts	Qualification
1	Indy Eleven (S)	10	4	6	0	15	8	+7	18	Playoffs
2	New York Cosmos	10	6	0	4	15	8	+7	18	
3	FC Edmonton	10	5	2	3	9	7	+2	17	
4	Minnesota United	10	5	1	4	16	12	+4	16	
5	Tampa Bay Rowdies	10	4	4	2	11	9	+2	16	
6	Fort Lauderdale Strikers	10	4	3	3	12	12	0	15	
7	Carolina RailHawks	10	4	2	4	11	13	−2	14	
8	Rayo OKC	10	3	3	4	11	12	−1	12	
9	Ottawa Fury	10	2	3	5	9	14	−5	9	
10	Jacksonville Armada	10	1	4	5	5	11	−6	7	
11	Miami FC	10	1	4	5	7	15	−8	7	

Source: NASL
Rules for classification: 1) points; 2) total goal differential; 3) total goals scored; 4) head-to-head record; 5) away goal differential; 6) away goals scored
(S) Spring season champion

====== Fall Season ======
Pos	Team	Pld	W	D	L	GF	GA	GD	Pts	Qualification
1	New York Cosmos (F)	22	14	5	3	44	21	+23	47	Playoffs
2	Indy Eleven	22	11	4	7	36	25	+11	37	
3	FC Edmonton	22	10	6	6	16	14	+2	36	
4	Rayo OKC	22	9	8	5	28	21	+7	35	
5	Miami FC	22	9	6	7	31	27	+4	33	
6	Fort Lauderdale Strikers	22	7	5	10	19	28	−9	26	
7	Carolina RailHawks	22	7	5	10	25	35	−10	26	
8	Minnesota United	22	6	7	9	25	25	0	25	
9	Puerto Rico	22	5	9	8	19	31	−12	24	
10	Tampa Bay Rowdies	22	5	8	9	29	32	−3	23	
11	Jacksonville Armada	22	5	8	9	25	35	−10	23	
12	Ottawa Fury	22	5	7	10	23	26	−3	22	

Source: NASL
Rules for classification: 1) points; 2) total goal differential; 3) total goals scored; 4) head-to-head record; 5) away goal differential; 6) away goals scored
(F) Fall season champion

===== USL =====
Eastern Conference

Pos	Team	Pld	W	D	L	GF	GA	GD	Pts	Qualification
1	New York Red Bulls II (C, X)	30	21	6	3	61	21	+40	69	Conference Playoffs
2	Louisville City FC	30	17	9	4	52	27	+25	60	Conference Playoffs
3	FC Cincinnati	30	16	8	6	41	27	+14	56	Conference Playoffs
4	Rochester Rhinos	30	13	12	5	38	25	+13	51	Conference Playoffs
5	Charlotte Independence	30	14	8	8	48	29	+19	50	Conference Playoffs
6	Charleston Battery	30	13	9	8	38	33	+5	48	Conference Playoffs
7	Richmond Kickers	30	12	9	9	33	26	+7	45	Conference Playoffs
8	Orlando City B	30	9	8	13	35	49	−14	35	Conference Playoffs
9	Wilmington Hammerheads FC	30	8	10	12	37	47	−10	34	
10	Harrisburg City Islanders	30	8	7	15	37	54	−17	31	
11	Bethlehem Steel FC	30	6	10	14	32	43	−11	28	
12	Toronto FC II	30	7	5	18	36	58	−22	26	
13	Pittsburgh Riverhounds	30	6	7	17	31	50	−19	25	
14	FC Montreal	30	7	2	21	35	57	−22	23	

Source: 2016 USL Standings
Rules for classification: 1) total wins; 2) total goal differential; 3) total goals scored; 4) points earned against top four Conference finishers; 5) disciplinary points; 6) coin toss or drawing of lots
(C) Champions; (X) Regular Season League Champion

Western Conference

Pos	Team	Pld	W	D	L	GF	GA	GD	Pts	Qualification
1	Sacramento Republic	30	14	10	6	43	27	+16	52	Conference Playoffs
2	Rio Grande Valley Toros	30	14	9	7	47	24	+23	51	Conference Playoffs
3	Colorado Springs Switchbacks	30	14	7	9	37	27	+10	49	Conference Playoffs
4	Swope Park Rangers	30	14	6	10	45	36	+9	48	Conference Playoffs
5	LA Galaxy II	30	12	11	7	52	42	+10	47	Conference Playoffs
6	Vancouver Whitecaps 2	30	12	9	9	44	44	0	45	Conference Playoffs
7	Oklahoma City Energy	30	10	13	7	32	30	+2	43	Conference Playoffs
8	Orange County Blues	30	12	4	14	39	41	−2	40	Conference Playoffs
9	Portland Timbers 2	30	12	4	14	38	42	−4	40	
10	San Antonio FC	30	10	8	12	36	36	0	38	
11	Real Monarchs	30	10	6	14	31	41	−10	36	
12	Seattle Sounders 2	30	9	8	13	35	50	−15	35	
13	Arizona United	30	9	7	14	40	46	−6	34	
14	Saint Louis FC	30	8	10	12	42	44	−2	34	
15	Tulsa Roughnecks	30	5	4	21	25	64	−39	19	

Source: 2016 USL Standings
Rules for classification: 1) total wins; 2) total goal differential; 3) total goals scored; 4) points earned against top four Conference finishers; 5) disciplinary points; 6) coin toss or drawing of lots

==== Cup competitions ====
===== US Open Cup =====
====== Final ======
September 13	FC Dallas (1)	4–2	New England Revolution (1)	Frisco, Texas
22:00 ET	Urruti 15', 61'; Hedges 40'; Díaz 45+7' (pen.); Zimmerman (yellow card) 51'	Report	Agudelo 6', 73'; Caldwell (yellow card) 29'; Woodberry (yellow card) 48'; Farrell (yellow card) 63'; Fagundez (yellow card) 66'	Stadium: Toyota Stadium; Attendance: 16,612; Referee: Baldomero Toledo

==== International competitions ====
===== CONCACAF competitions =====
Club	Competition	Final round
D.C. United	2015–16 CONCACAF Champions League	Quarterfinals
LA Galaxy	2015–16 CONCACAF Champions League	Quarterfinals
Real Salt Lake	2015–16 CONCACAF Champions League	Quarterfinals
Seattle Sounders FC	2015–16 CONCACAF Champions League	Quarterfinals
FC Dallas	2016–17 CONCACAF Champions League	Semifinals
New York Red Bulls	2016–17 CONCACAF Champions League	Quarterfinals
Portland Timbers	2016–17 CONCACAF Champions League	Group Stage
Sporting Kansas City	2016–17 CONCACAF Champions League	Group Stage

====== Quarter-finals ======
Team 1	Agg.	Team 2	1st leg	2nd leg
Seattle Sounders FC (United States)	3–5	(Mexico) América	2–2	1–3
Querétaro (Mexico)	3–1	(United States) D.C. United	2–0	1–1
UANL (Mexico)	3–1	(United States) Real Salt Lake	2–0	1–1
LA Galaxy (United States)	0–4	(Mexico) Santos Laguna	0–0	0–4

====== Group B ======
Pos	Team	Pld	W	D	L	GF	GA	GD	Pts	Qualification	SAP	POR	DRA
1	(Costa Rica) Saprissa	4	2	2	0	11	3	+8	8	Quarter-finals	—	4–2	6−0
2	(United States) Portland Timbers	4	2	1	1	7	7	0	7		1−1	—	2–1
3	(El Salvador) Dragón	4	0	1	3	2	10	−8	1		0−0	1–2	—

Source: CONCACAF
Rules for classification: Group stage tiebreakers

====== Group C ======
Pos	Team	Pld	W	D	L	GF	GA	GD	Pts	Qualification	VAN	SKC	CEN
1	(Canada) Vancouver Whitecaps FC	4	4	0	0	10	2	+8	12	Quarter-finals	—	3–0	4–1
2	(United States) Sporting Kansas City	4	1	1	2	6	8	−2	4		1–2	—	3–1
3	(Trinidad and Tobago) Central	4	0	1	3	4	10	−6	1		0–1	2–2	—

Source: CONCACAF
Rules for classification: Group stage tiebreakers

====== Group F ======
Pos	Team	Pld	W	D	L	GF	GA	GD	Pts	Qualification	NYR	ALI	ANT
1	(United States) New York Red Bulls	4	2	2	0	5	1	+4	8	Quarter-finals	—	1–0	3–0
2	(El Salvador) Alianza	4	1	2	1	5	4	+1	5		1–1	—	1–1
3	(Guatemala) Antigua	4	0	2	2	2	7	−5	2		0–0	1–3	—

Source: CONCACAF
Rules for classification: Group stage tiebreakers

====== Group H ======
Pos	Team	Pld	W	D	L	GF	GA	GD	Pts	Qualification	DAL	SUC	EST
1	(United States) FC Dallas	4	2	2	0	8	4	+4	8	Quarter-finals	—	0–0	2–1
2	(Guatemala) Suchitepéquez	4	1	2	1	4	6	−2	5		2–5	—	1–0
3	(Nicaragua) Real Estelí	4	0	2	2	3	5	−2	2		1–1	1–1	—

Source: CONCACAF
Rules for classification: Group stage tiebreakers

=== Women's ===
==== League competitions ====
===== National Women's Soccer League =====
====== Overall table ======
Pos	Team	Pld	W	D	L	GF	GA	GD	Pts	Qualification
1	Portland Thorns FC	20	12	5	3	35	19	+16	41	NWSL Shield
2	Washington Spirit	20	12	3	5	30	21	+9	39	NWSL Playoffs
3	Chicago Red Stars	20	9	6	5	24	20	+4	33	NWSL Playoffs
4	Western New York Flash (C)	20	9	5	6	40	26	+14	32	NWSL Playoffs
5	Seattle Reign FC	20	8	6	6	29	21	+8	30	
6	FC Kansas City	20	7	5	8	18	20	−2	26	
7	Sky Blue FC	20	7	5	8	24	30	−6	26	
8	Houston Dash	20	6	4	10	29	29	0	22	
9	Orlando Pride	20	6	1	13	20	30	−10	19	
10	Boston Breakers	20	3	2	15	14	47	−33	11	

Source: NWSL
Rules for classification: Tiebreakers
(C) Champions

== Final ==
July 17, 2016
12:00 PM

Olympic Club	2–0	United FC

Dick's Sporting Goods Park - Field 14, Denver, Colorado

== Honors ==
=== Professional ===
Men
Competition		Winner
U.S. Open Cup		FC Dallas
MLS Supporters' Shield		FC Dallas
MLS Cup		Seattle Sounders FC
NASL	Spring season	Indy Eleven
NASL	Fall season	New York Cosmos
NASL	Regular season	New York Cosmos
NASL	Soccer Bowl	New York Cosmos
USL	Regular season	New York Red Bulls II
USL	Playoffs	New York Red Bulls II

Women
Competition	Winner
NWSL Championship	Western New York Flash
NWSL Shield	Portland Thorns FC
Women's Premier Soccer League	Boston Breakers Reserves
United Women's Soccer	Santa Clarita Blue Heat

=== Amateur ===
Men
Competition	Team
Premier Development League	Michigan Bucks
National Premier Soccer League	AFC Cleveland
NCAA Division I Soccer Championship	Stanford University
NCAA Division II Soccer Championship	Wingate University
NCAA Division III Soccer Championship	Tufts University
NAIA Soccer Championship	Hastings College (NE)

Women
Competition	Team
NCAA Division I Soccer Championship	University of Southern California
NCAA Division II Soccer Championship	Western Washington University
NCAA Division III Soccer Championship	Washington University in St. Louis
NAIA Soccer Championship	University of Northwestern Ohio
