= Toral =

Toral may refer to:

- Toral (given name)
- Toral (surname)
- Toral (Star Trek), a fictional character in Star Trek
- Operation Toral, the codename for British presence within Afghanistan post-2014
- Toral Lie algebra
- Surrender of General Toral, an 1898 film
- Toral de los Guzmanes, a municipality in Spain
- Toral de los Vados, a municipality in Spain
