= 2016 U-20 Copa Libertadores =

Copa Libertadores de América Sub-20 2016

Tournament details
- Host country: Paraguay
- Dates: 30 January – 14 February 2016
- Teams: 12 (from 10 associations)
- Venue: 4 (in 2 host cities)

Final positions
- Champions: (Brazil) São Paulo (1st title)
- Runners-up: (Uruguay) Liverpool
- Third place: (Colombia) Cortuluá
- Fourth place: (Argentina) Lanús

Tournament statistics
- Matches played: 22
- Goals scored: 76 (3.45 per match)
- Top scorer: (Brazil) Luiz Araújo (5 goals)
- Fair play award: (Colombia) Cortuluá

The 2016 U-20 Copa Libertadores (Spanish: Copa Libertadores Sub-20 2016) was the 3rd edition of the U-20 Copa Libertadores, South America's premier under-20 club football tournament organized by CONMEBOL. The tournament, which returned after a four-year hiatus having been temporarily discontinued since 2012, was held in the cities of Asunción and Luque, Paraguay, from 30 January to 14 February 2016.

== Teams ==
The competition was contested by 12 teams: the title holder, the champion club from each of the ten CONMEBOL member associations, and one additional team from the host association Paraguay.

Players must be born on or after 1 January 1996. However, each team may include a maximum of five players born on or after 1 January 1995.

Association	Team	Qualifying method	Participation	Best result
Argentina	River Plate	Title holder (2012 champion)	2nd	Champion (2012)
Argentina	Lanús	2015 Torneo de Cuarta División champion	1st	n/a
Bolivia	Bolívar	2015 U-20 Torneo Nacional champion	1st	n/a
Brazil	São Paulo	2015 U-20 Copa do Brasil champion	1st	n/a
Chile	Huachipato	2015 U-19 National champion	1st	n/a
Colombia	Cortuluá	2015 U-20 Torneo Postobón champion	1st	n/a
Ecuador	Independiente del Valle	2015 U-18 Serie A champion	3rd	Quarterfinals (2011)
Paraguay	Cerro Porteño	2015 U-20 Torneo Apertura champion	2nd	Quarterfinals (2012)
Paraguay	Libertad	2015 U-20 Torneo Clausura champion	2nd	Quarterfinals (2011)
Peru	Melgar	2015 U-18 Copa Federación champion	1st	n/a
Uruguay	Liverpool	2015 U-19 Annual champion	1st	n/a
Venezuela	Deportivo La Guaira	2015 U-20 Torneo Venezolano champion	2nd	Group stage (2012)

== Venues ==
The tournament was played in four venues in two cities, all in the Metropolitan Area of Asunción:

- Estadio Defensores del Chaco, Asunción
- Estadio Dr. Nicolás Léoz, Asunción (home stadium of Club Libertad)
- Estadio Manuel Ferreira, Asunción (home stadium of Club Olimpia)
- Estadio Feliciano Cáceres, Luque (home stadium of Sportivo Luqueño)

== Group stage ==
The draw of the tournament was held on 15 January 2016, 12:00 local time, at the headquarters of the Paraguayan Football Association in Asunción. For the group stage, the 12 teams were drawn into three groups of four. The two teams from Paraguay (Cerro Porteño and Libertad) and the title holder (River Plate) were seeded.

In the group stage, the teams were ranked according to points (3 points for a win, 1 point for a draw, 0 points for a loss). If tied on points, tiebreakers were applied in the following order:

1. Goal difference in all games;
2. Goals scored in all games;
3. Head-to-head result in games between tied teams;
4. Penalty shoot-out (between two teams playing against each other in the last match of the group)
5. Drawing of lots.

The winners of each group and the best runner-up among all groups advanced to the knockout stage.

All times local, PYST (UTC−3).

=== Group A ===
Pos	Team	Pld	W	D	L	GF	GA	GD	Pts	Qualification
1	(Uruguay) Liverpool	3	2	0	1	14	4	+10	6	Knockout stage
2	(Argentina) Lanús	3	2	0	1	6	3	+3	6	Knockout stage
3	(Paraguay) Cerro Porteño (H)	3	2	0	1	7	5	+2	6	
4	(Bolivia) Bolívar	3	0	0	3	2	17	−15	0	

Source: CONMEBOL
(H) Hosts
30 January 2016
18:00

Bolívar (Bolivia)	0–2	(Argentina) Lanús
	Report	C. Ramírez 82'; Argañaraz 87'

Estadio Feliciano Cáceres, Luque
Referee: Carlos Orbe (Ecuador)
30 January 2016
20:30

Cerro Porteño (Paraguay)	1–2	(Uruguay) Liverpool
Ro. Martínez 3'	Report	De la Cruz 15'; J. Ramírez 78'

Estadio Feliciano Cáceres, Luque
Referee: Anderson Daronco (Brazil)

2 February 2016
18:00

Liverpool (Uruguay)	0–3	(Argentina) Lanús
	Report	Ochoa 38'; C. Ramírez 49'; Maciel 90+1'

Estadio Defensores del Chaco, Asunción
Referee: Jorge Osorio (Chile)
2 February 2016
20:15

Cerro Porteño (Paraguay)	3–2	(Bolivia) Bolívar
Ri. Martínez 46'; Villalba 75'; Alderete 90+4'	Report	Montero 14', 43'

Estadio Defensores del Chaco, Asunción
Referee: Luis Garay (Paraguay)

5 February 2016
18:00

Bolívar (Bolivia)	0–12	(Uruguay) Liverpool
	Report	Machado 15'; González 19', 57'; De la Cruz 20', 21', 64'; Sención 36' (pen.); Pintos 52'; J. Ramírez 59', 66', 74'; Silveira 76' (pen.)

Estadio Defensores del Chaco, Asunción
Referee: Jesús Valenzuela (Venezuela)
5 February 2016
20:15

Cerro Porteño (Paraguay)	3–1	(Argentina) Lanús
Ri. Martínez 60', 63'; Ro. Martínez 90'	Report	G. Ramírez 25' (pen.)

Estadio Defensores del Chaco, Asunción
Referee: Wilson Lamouroux (Colombia)

=== Group B ===
Pos	Team	Pld	W	D	L	GF	GA	GD	Pts	Qualification
1	(Brazil) São Paulo	3	2	1	0	12	1	+11	7	Knockout stage
2	(Paraguay) Libertad (H)	3	1	1	1	5	4	+1	4	
3	(Ecuador) Independiente del Valle	3	1	1	1	3	10	−7	4	
4	(Peru) Melgar	3	0	1	2	2	7	−5	1	

Source: CONMEBOL
(H) Hosts
31 January 2016
18:00

Melgar (Peru)	1–1	(Ecuador) Independiente del Valle
Gonzales-Vigil 59'	Report	Toledo 52' (o.g.)

Estadio Dr. Nicolás Léoz, Asunción
Referee: Óscar Rojas (Uruguay)
31 January 2016
20:15

Libertad (Paraguay)	1–1	(Brazil) São Paulo
Mendieta 31'	Report	Araújo 42'

Estadio Dr. Nicolás Léoz, Asunción
Referee: Germán Delfino (Argentina)

3 February 2016
19:30

São Paulo (Brazil)	8–0	(Ecuador) Independiente del Valle
Shaylon 16', 70'; David Neres 28', 45'; Araújo 68', 82', 86'; Murilo 80'	Report

Estadio Manuel Ferreira, Asunción
Referee: Jesús Valenzuela (Venezuela)
3 February 2015
20:15

Libertad (Paraguay)	3–1	(Peru) Melgar
Rodríguez 14'; J. Medina 46'; B. Medina 90'	Report	Arias 37'

Estadio Dr. Nicolás Léoz, Asunción
Referee: Wilson Lamouroux (Colombia)

6 February 2016
18:00

Melgar (Peru)	0–3	(Brazil) São Paulo
	Report	Pedro 11'; David Neres 21'; Artur 45'

Estadio Dr. Nicolás Léoz, Asunción
Referee: Luis Yrusta (Bolivia)
6 February 2016
20:15

Libertad (Paraguay)	1–2	(Ecuador) Independiente del Valle
Á. Benítez 77'	Report	Ayoví 60'; Landazuri 81' (pen.)

Estadio Dr. Nicolás Léoz, Asunción
Referee: Jorge Osorio (Chile)

=== Group C ===
Pos	Team	Pld	W	D	L	GF	GA	GD	Pts	Qualification
1	(Colombia) Cortuluá	3	2	0	1	9	5	+4	6	Knockout stage
2	(Chile) Huachipato	3	2	0	1	5	4	+1	6	
3	(Argentina) River Plate	3	2	0	1	4	3	+1	6	
4	(Venezuela) Deportivo La Guaira	3	0	0	3	0	6	−6	0	

Source: CONMEBOL
1 February 2016
18:00

Deportivo La Guaira (Venezuela)	0–2	(Chile) Huachipato
	Report	Molini 35', 55'

Estadio Manuel Ferreira, Asunción
Referee: Luis Yrusta (Bolivia)
1 February 2016
20:15

River Plate (Argentina)	3–2	(Colombia) Cortuluá
Casquete 29'; Franco 39'; Montiel 80'	Report	Camilo 45+3'; Angulo 65'

Estadio Manuel Ferreira, Asunción
Referee: Ulises Mereles (Paraguay)

4 February 2016
18:00

Cortuluá (Colombia)	4–2	(Chile) Huachipato
Angulo 18'; Palacios 33'; Izquierdo 77'; Camilo 90+2'	Report	Pontoni 45+1'; Molini 90' (pen.)

Estadio Manuel Ferreira, Asunción
Referee: Anderson Daronco (Brazil)
4 February 2016
20:15

River Plate (Argentina)	1–0	(Venezuela) Deportivo La Guaira
Casquete 47'	Report

Estadio Manuel Ferreira, Asunción
Referee: Carlos Orbe (Ecuador)

7 February 2016
18:00

Deportivo La Guaira (Venezuela)	0–3	(Colombia) Cortuluá
	Report	Izquierdo 54', 66'; Camilo 83'

Estadio Manuel Ferreira, Asunción
Referee: Luis Garay (Paraguay)
7 February 2016
20:15

River Plate (Argentina)	0–1	(Chile) Huachipato
	Report	Davila 75'

Estadio Manuel Ferreira, Asunción
Referee: Óscar Rojas (Uruguay)

=== Ranking of second-placed teams ===
Pos	Grp	Team	Pld	W	D	L	GF	GA	GD	Pts	Qualification
1	A	(Argentina) Lanús	3	2	0	1	6	3	+3	6	Knockout stage
2	C	(Chile) Huachipato	3	2	0	1	5	4	+1	6	
3	B	(Paraguay) Libertad	3	1	1	1	5	4	+1	4	

Source: CONMEBOL
Rules for classification: 1) points; 2) goal difference; 3) goals scored; 4) drawing of lots.

== Knockout stage ==
In the knockout stage, the winners of the semi-finals (Group A winner vs. Group C winner; Group B winner vs. Best runner-up) advanced to the final, while the losers played in the third place match. If tied after regulation time, the penalty shoot-out was used to determine the winner (no extra time was played).

=== Bracket ===
Semi-finals
11 February – Manuel Ferreira
(Uruguay) Liverpool (pen.)	0 (7)
(Colombia) Cortuluá	0 (6)
11 February – Manuel Ferreira
(Brazil) São Paulo	3
(Argentina) Lanús	2

Final
14 February – Defensores del Chaco
(Uruguay) Liverpool	0
(Brazil) São Paulo	1
Third place
14 February – Defensores del Chaco
(Colombia) Cortuluá	1
(Argentina) Lanús	0

=== Semi-finals ===
11 February 2016
18:00

Liverpool (Uruguay)	0–0	(Colombia) Cortuluá
	Report
Penalties
Sención (penalty scored); De la Cruz (penalty scored); Laport (penalty scored); R. Rodríguez (penalty scored); P. González (penalty scored); J. Ramírez (penalty scored); Machado (penalty scored)	7–6	(penalty scored) Millán; (penalty scored) Bolaños; (penalty scored) Batalla; (penalty scored) Buritica; (penalty scored) Rojas; (penalty scored) D. Rodríguez; (penalty missed) López

Estadio Manuel Ferreira, Asunción
Referee: Jorge Osorio (Chile)

11 February 2016
20:15

São Paulo (Brazil)	3–2	(Argentina) Lanús
Araújo 35'; David Neres 45+1'; Pedro 49'	Report	C. Ramírez 9'; G. Ramírez 20'

Estadio Manuel Ferreira, Asunción
Referee: Ulises Mereles (Paraguay)

=== Third place match ===
14 February 2016
18:00

Cortuluá (Colombia)	1–0	(Argentina) Lanús
D. Ramírez 43'	Report

Estadio Defensores del Chaco, Asunción
Referee: Carlos Orbe (Ecuador)

=== Final ===
14 February 2016
20:15

Liverpool (Uruguay)	0–1	(Brazil) São Paulo
	Report	Lucas Fernandes 84'

Estadio Defensores del Chaco, Asunción
Referee: Jesús Valenzuela (Venezuela)

== Final standings ==
Pos	Team	Pld	W	D	L	GF	GA	GD	Pts
1	(Brazil) São Paulo	5	4	1	0	16	3	+13	13
2	(Uruguay) Liverpool	5	2	1	2	14	5	+9	7
Eliminated in the Semi-finals
3	(Colombia) Cortuluá	5	3	1	1	10	5	+5	10
4	(Argentina) Lanús	5	2	0	3	8	7	+1	6
Eliminated in the First Stage
5	(Paraguay) Cerro Porteño	3	2	0	1	7	5	+2	6
6	(Chile) Huachipato	3	2	0	1	5	4	+1	6
7	(Argentina) River Plate	3	2	0	1	5	4	+1	6
8	(Paraguay) Libertad	3	1	1	1	5	4	+1	4
9	(Ecuador) Independiente del Valle	3	1	1	1	3	10	-7	4
10	(Peru) Melgar	3	0	1	2	2	7	-5	1
11	(Venezuela) Deportivo La Guaira	3	0	0	3	0	6	-6	0
12	(Bolivia) Bolívar	3	0	0	3	2	17	-15	0
