= Rodrigo Rodríguez =

Rodrigo Rodríguez may refer to:

- Rodrigo Rodríguez (musician) (born 1978), Argentine shakuhachi musician
- Rodrigo Rodríguez (footballer, born 1990), Bolivian football midfielder
- Rodrigo Rodríguez (footballer, born 1995), Uruguayan football goalkeeper

== See also ==
- Rodrigo Rodrigues (born 1974), Brazilian actor and filmmaker
- Rodrigo Rodrigues (TV host) (1975–2020), Brazilian journalist, TV host and musician
