= Trinidad and Tobago v United States =

Trinidad and Tobago v United States may refer to:

- Trinidad and Tobago v United States (1989), 1990 FIFA World Cup qualifier that ended with a 1–0 victory for the United States.
- Trinidad and Tobago v United States (2017), 2018 FIFA World Cup qualifier that ended in a 2–1 victory for Trinidad and Tobago.
