= Eric Barrios =

Argentine footballer (born 1998)

Personal information
- Full name: Eric Hernán Barrios
- Date of birth: 17 February 1998 (age 28)
- Place of birth: Rojas, Argentina
- Height: 1.72 m (5 ft 8 in)
- Position: Midfielder

Team information
- Current team: Samtredia
- Number: 8

Youth career
- Huracán de Rojas
- Fundación Leo Messi
- River Plate

Senior career*
Years	Team	Apps	(Gls)
2019–2021	Juventud	66	(0)
2022	Ayacucho	27	(1)
2023	Guillermo Brown	20	(0)
2024–	Samtredia	22	(1)
- * Club domestic league appearances and goals as of 15 September 2024

Eric Hernán Barrios (born 17 February 1998) is an Argentine professional footballer who plays as a midfielder for Georgian club Samtredia.

== Career ==
Barrios started out in the academy of Huracán de Rojas in 2004, prior to moving on to the systems of Fundación Leo Messi and River Plate. After a period in the latter's youth academy, having appeared at the Generation Adidas Cup, the midfielder left in January 2019 to join Juventud of Uruguay's Primera División. He made his debut during a loss to Fénix on 16 February, taking the place of Cristian Sención after sixty-seven minutes.

== Career statistics ==
As of 19 February 2019.

Appearances and goals by club, season and competition
Club	Season	League			Cup		Continental		Other		Total	
Club	Season	Division	Apps	Goals	Apps	Goals	Apps	Goals	Apps	Goals	Apps	Goals
Juventud	2019	Primera División	1	0	0	0	—		0	0	1	0
Career total			1	0	0	0	—		0	0	1	0
