= Trinidad and Tobago v United States (2018 FIFA World Cup qualification) =

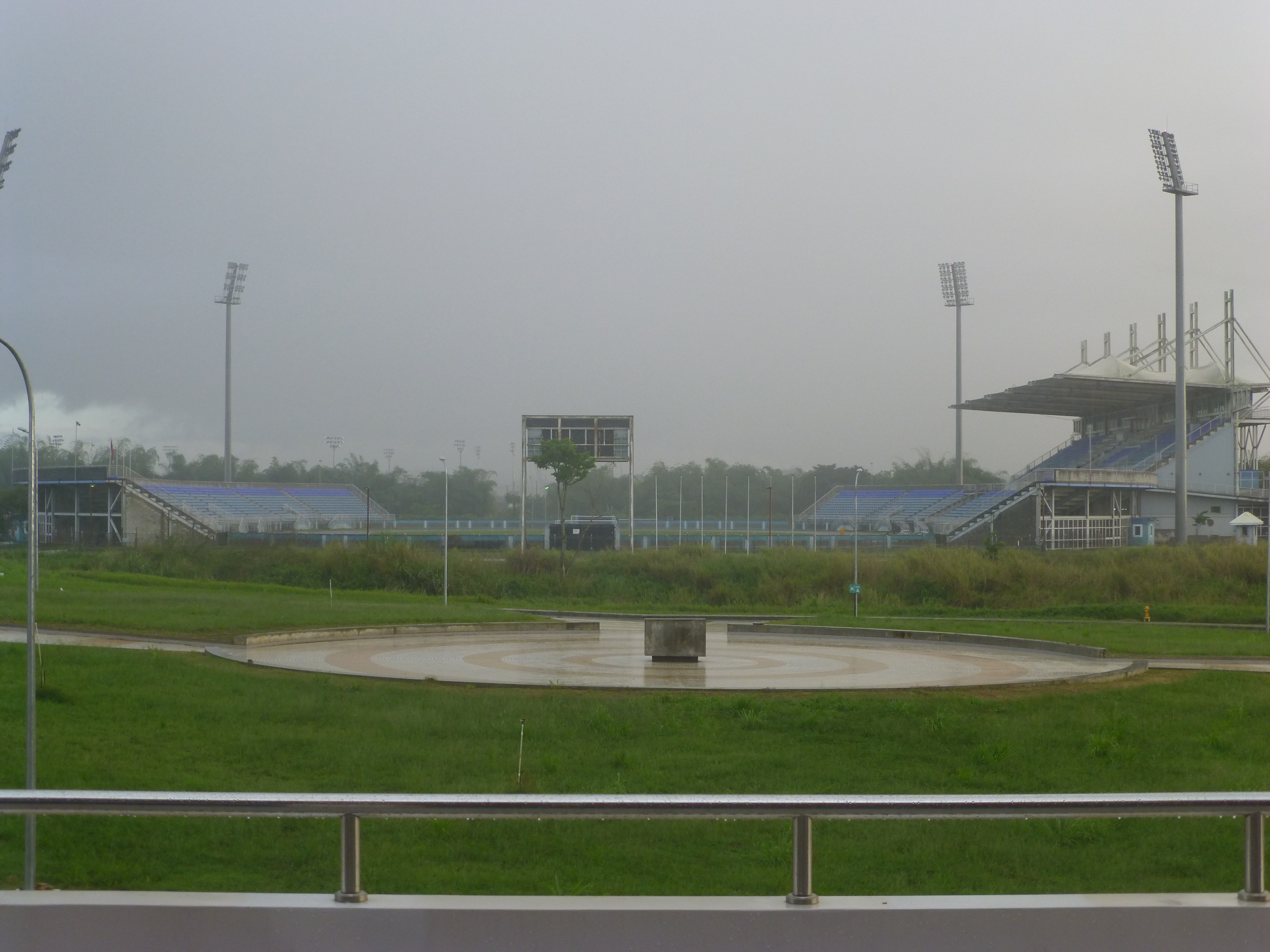
- Ato Boldon Stadium hosted the match
- Event: 2018 FIFA World Cup qualification – CONCACAF fifth round
Trinidad and Tobago	United States
(Trinidad and Tobago)	(United States)
2	1
- Panama qualifies for the 2018 FIFA World Cup; Honduras advances to the CONCACAF–AFC inter-confederation play-off United States fails to qualify for the World Cup for the first time since 1986
- Date: October 10, 2017
- Venue: Ato Boldon Stadium, Couva
- Referee: Marlon Mejía (El Salvador)
- Attendance: 1,500

On October 10, 2017, Trinidad and Tobago played against the United States at the Ato Boldon Stadium in Couva in what was the final 2018 FIFA World Cup qualification match for both teams. Trinidad and Tobago won the match 2–1 which resulted in the United States missing their first World Cup since 1986, as well as Trinidad and Tobago's first win over the United States since 2008, and their third win against them in international association football.

== Background ==
Following consecutive losses to Mexico and Costa Rica in the opening games of the final round of qualification in the 2018 FIFA World Cup, Jürgen Klinsmann was fired from the United States men's national team job and replaced by former USMNT coach Bruce Arena. On his 3rd game back in charge, Arena coached the U.S. to a 6–0 victory over Honduras, and 4 days later got a 1–1 draw against Panama at Panama City. Three months after that, they beat Trinidad and Tobago 2–0 in Commerce City, Colorado, both goals coming from Christian Pulisic, giving the United States a total of 7 points in the qualification group standings. After earning only 2 points from their next three games, the United States hosted Panama and got a 4–0 victory before traveling to Trinidad and Tobago for the game.

Despite their unremarkable play to that point, the United States entered their final WCQ match in excellent position to secure an eighth-consecutive World Cup appearance, and a seemingly impossible combination of results would have to occur to prevent this. With a win, the U.S. would mathematically guarantee qualification for the World Cup regardless of the outcome of the other two matches. A draw, likewise, would be enough to clinch a World Cup spot, barring an extraordinarily unlikely combination of scores from the other two matches: an 8-goal margin of victory for low-scoring Panama (against Costa Rica) and a 13-goal margin of victory for second-from-last Honduras (against undefeated Mexico).

Even with a loss to the underdog Trinidadians, the Americans would still qualify with either a loss or a draw by both Panama and Honduras. Moreover, if one of these two teams were to win, the U.S. would remain in contention with a loss or a draw by the other; this latter scenario would lock the U.S. into fourth-place and force a two-legged tie with Australia, who had defeated Syria 3–2 on aggregate. In summary, only one of 27 possible W-L-D combinations would eliminate the United States from the World Cup.

Trinidad and Tobago, meanwhile, was already eliminated, and had almost nothing to play for besides revenge for Paul Caligiuri's infamous goal in 1989, which allowed the U.S. to qualify in Trinidad's place.

Before the match, the CONCACAF fifth round table was as follows:

Pos	Team	Pld	W	D	L	GF	GA	GD	Pts	Qualification
1	Mexico (Q)	9	6	3	0	14	5	+9	21	Qualification to 2018 FIFA World Cup
2	Costa Rica (Q)	9	4	4	1	13	6	+7	16	Qualification to 2018 FIFA World Cup
3	United States	9	3	3	3	16	11	+5	12	Qualification to 2018 FIFA World Cup
4	Panama	9	2	4	3	7	9	−2	10	Advance to inter-confederation play-offs
5	Honduras	9	2	4	3	10	17	−7	10	
6	Trinidad and Tobago (E)	9	1	0	8	5	18	−13	3	

Source: CBS Sports
Rules for classification: Qualification tiebreakers
(E) Eliminated; (Q) Qualified for the phase indicated

== Pre-match ==
The match was played at the smaller Ato Boldon Stadium instead of Hasely Crawford Stadium due to the stadium's issues with its floodlights. Heavy rain in the days preceding the match meant that the field at Ato Boldon Stadium was soaked, impeding practice the day before the match on October 9.

As Trinidad and Tobago were already eliminated from advancement to the World Cup, they included a number of young and untested players in their starting lineup rather than their usual starters, a common practice.

== Match ==
=== Summary ===
In the 17th minute, U.S. defender Omar Gonzalez deflected a cross from Alvin Jones into the U.S. net, putting Trinidad and Tobago up 1-0. While Trinidad and Tobago had few reasonable chances in the first half, Jones doubled their lead nonetheless with a "blistering 35-yard strike". The U.S. brought in Clint Dempsey with hopes of creating more opportunities and managed to score a goal two minutes into the second half through Christian Pulisic, but their efforts were in vain as the Soca Warriors held them back until the final whistle.

=== Details ===
October 10, 2017
20:00 AST

Trinidad and Tobago	2–1	United States
Gonzalez 17' (o.g.); A. Jones 37'	Report	Pulisic 47'

Ato Boldon Stadium, Couva
Attendance: 1,500
Referee: Marlon Mejía (El Salvador)

Trinidad and Tobago	United States

GK	22	Adrian Foncette
RB	8	Khaleem Hyland (c)
CB	5	Daneil Cyrus
CB	13	Curtis Gonzales
LB	18	Triston Hodge	(yellow card) 68'	(substituted off) 82'
RM	17	Alvin Jones
CM	23	Leston Paul
CM	19	Kevan George
LM	7	Nathan Lewis
CF	9	Shahdon Winchester		(substituted off) 78'
CF	16	Levi García		(substituted off) 72'
Substitutes:
GK	1	Glenroy Samuel
GK	21	Greg Ranjitsingh
DF	2	Kareem Moses
DF	3	Joevin Jones	(yellow card) 90+3'	(substituted on) 72'
DF	4	Kevon Villaroel		(substituted on) 82'
DF	6	Josiah Trimmingham
MF	10	Duane Muckette
MF	15	Jared London
FW	11	Neil Benjamin
FW	12	Kathon St. Hillaire
FW	14	Akeem Roach
FW	20	Trevin Caesar		(substituted on) 78'
Manager:
Dennis Lawrence

GK	1	Tim Howard
RB	2	DeAndre Yedlin
CB	3	Omar Gonzalez	(yellow card) 90+1'
CB	5	Matt Besler	(yellow card) 90+5'
LB	15	Jorge Villafaña		(substituted off) 72'
RM	21	Paul Arriola		(substituted off) 46'
CM	4	Michael Bradley (c)
CM	6	Darlington Nagbe		(substituted off) 84'
LM	10	Christian Pulisic
CF	17	Jozy Altidore
CF	9	Bobby Wood
Substitutes:
GK	12	Brad Guzan
GK	22	Nick Rimando
DF	14	Tim Ream
DF	20	Geoff Cameron
MF	7	DaMarcus Beasley
MF	11	Alejandro Bedoya
MF	13	Dax McCarty
MF	16	Benny Feilhaber		(substituted on) 84'
MF	19	Graham Zusi
MF	23	Kellyn Acosta		(substituted on) 72'
FW	8	Clint Dempsey		(substituted on) 46'
FW	18	Chris Wondolowski
Manager:
Bruce Arena

== Post-match ==
=== Results ===
Pos	Team	Pld	W	D	L	GF	GA	GD	Pts	Qualification
1	Mexico	10	6	3	1	16	7	+9	21	Qualification to 2018 FIFA World Cup
2	Costa Rica	10	4	4	2	14	8	+6	16	Qualification to 2018 FIFA World Cup
3	Panama	10	3	4	3	9	10	−1	13	Qualification to 2018 FIFA World Cup
4	Honduras	10	3	4	3	13	19	−6	13	Advance to inter-confederation play-offs
5	United States	10	3	3	4	17	13	+4	12	
6	Trinidad and Tobago	10	2	0	8	7	19	−12	6	

Source: FIFA
Rules for classification: Qualification tiebreakers

To the surprise of many, both Central American underdogs, Panama and Honduras, won against Costa Rica and Mexico respectively. Panamanian forward Blas Pérez scored a controversial ghost goal in the 53rd minute to equalize the score 1–1, before Román Torres scored the winning goal in the 88th minute. Honduras also pulled a comeback in their win against Mexico. The Mexican team had a 2–1 lead at half-time before Eddie Hernández's shot bounced off of the crossbar and hit the back of Mexican goalkeeper Guillermo Ochoa's head and went into the net, putting the score at 2–2. Seven minutes later, Romell Quioto scored the winning goal for Honduras, ending Mexico's chance to go unbeaten throughout the qualifying rounds. Because of the United States' loss and their win, Panama qualified automatically for the group stage of the 2018 competition, while Honduras advanced to the CONCACAF–AFC play-off matches against Australia.

== Reactions ==
=== Media ===
The result and failure for the U.S. to qualify made national and international news overnight. ESPN FC hosted a segment on the game and openly criticized the "arrogance" that the United States team had. Alejandro Moreno criticized the players' commitment and passion for the game. Shaka Hislop, a former goalkeeper who represented Trinidad and Tobago in the 2006 FIFA World Cup, blamed the U.S. media for asking Arena about the performance of European players and other unrelated questions of the match the day before. Hislop also criticized the United States team for their criticism of the field conditions.

Taylor Twellman gave an unscripted rant on ESPN in which he highlighted the lack of focus on the match at hand, claiming players and broadcasters asked for scorelines from the other matches in qualifying, and dismissing the pitch criticism, citing Bosnia and Herzegovina and Belgium playing against each other on what he called a "cow pasture". Twellman also stated that the U.S. needs to revise everything about the United States Soccer Federation, including Major League Soccer and the "pay to play" system of U.S. youth soccer. He cited the German Football Association as an example of a nation that had successfully changed its culture after their national team failed in Euro 2000 and Euro 2004. The next day, Twellman said the U.S. men's national team had an arrogance that he cannot understand and that soccer must not be the American way. That same day, Fox Sports' Alexi Lalas rued U.S. elimination as "we have nobody to blame but ourselves."

An analysis by the sports side of the blog FiveThirtyEight called the match "the worst loss in USMNT's history based on the Elo rating system" since the USMNT was so heavily favored, which made the loss all the more stinging due to the high stakes involved. A retrospective by the sports blog SB Nation agreed, calling the match the worst in the U.S. men's team's history.

Some news outlets and journalists described this American loss as a "revenge", particularly by pointing that the United States had prevented Trinidad and Tobago, Costa Rica, and Panama from qualifying to the 1990, 2010, and 2014 World Cups, respectively. Trinidadian journalist Lasana Liburd mocked the U.S. by saying "Make America Great Again? We'd rather not" and Kelvin Jones, an unused substitute during the United States' victory over Trinidad and Tobago in 1989, said his son Alvin ensured "that, for at least the next four years, the USA's Pulisic will now know how he felt." Trinidadian politician and former CONCACAF president Jack Warner rejoiced on the U.S. elimination and La Nación's Amado Hidalgo expressed that "maybe Trinidad avenged us all." On Twitter, ESPN Deportes also suggested that Panama's qualification over the United States was "a revenge".

In the years following the match, U.S. fans and media have used the metonym "Couva" to refer to their infamous defeat and subsequent failure to qualify for the World Cup.

=== United States national team ===
Bruce Arena resigned as the head coach of the team shortly after the match. Omar Gonzalez in a post-match press conference stated his own goal "is one that will haunt me forever."

Following a year-long stint by Dave Sarachan as interim head coach, Gregg Berhalter was hired to coach the U.S. through the 2022 World Cup. Former regulars such as Howard, Dempsey, Altidore, and Bradley retired or were phased out of the team and were replaced by young players such as Tyler Adams, Weston McKennie, Yunus Musah, and Sergiño Dest who helped to guide the U.S. back to the top of CONCACAF and ultimately towards qualification for the following World Cup in 2022.

=== Rematches ===
The two teams met for the first time since the Soca Warriors eliminated the U.S. on June 22, 2019 in the CONCACAF Gold Cup group stage. This time, the U.S. handily won the match 6–0. Following 3 more matches in the U.S. which the Stars and Stripes won, outscoring Trinidad and Tobago 16–0 in the process, the two sides met in Trinidad for the first time since their 2017 encounter, this time at Hasely Crawford Stadium in Port of Spain, for the second leg of the 2023–24 CONCACAF Nations League quarterfinals on November 20, 2023. Once again, Trinidad and Tobago defeated the United States by an identical 2–1 score, with Alvin Jones scoring another goal from well outside the box. Despite the loss, the U.S. still advanced to the Finals and 2024 Copa America, for which they would host, as they had won the first leg 3–0, securing a 4–2 aggregate victory.

== See also ==
- Uruguay v Brazil (1950 FIFA World Cup)
- 1985 China v Hong Kong football match
- 1993 Japan v Iraq football match
- 1998 FIFA World Cup qualification (AFC–OFC play-off)
- Brazil v Germany (2014 FIFA World Cup)
- 2018 FIFA World Cup Group F#South Korea vs Germany
- History of the United States men's national soccer team
- Shot heard round the world (soccer)
- United States v England (1950 FIFA World Cup)
