= Peñaranda =

Peñaranda may refer to:

- Peñaranda, Nueva Ecija, a municipality in the Philippines
- Peñaranda (surname)
