= Cristian Borja =

Cristian Borja is the name of:

- Cristian Martínez Borja (born 1988), Colombian football forward
- Cristian Borja (footballer, born 1993), Colombian football defender
