= Adrian Foncette =

Trinidadian international footballer

Personal information
- Full name: Adrian Jamal Foncette
- Date of birth: 10 October 1988 (age 38)
- Place of birth: Arima, Trinidad and Tobago
- Height: 6 ft 1 in (1.85 m)
- Position: Goalkeeper

Team information
- Current team: Police

Youth career
- St. Ann's Rangers

College career
Years	Team	Apps	(Gls)
2008–2011	Albany Great Danes	48	(0)

Senior career*
Years	Team	Apps	(Gls)
2012–2013	North East Stars		
2013	Western Mass Pioneers		
2013–	Police		

International career^{‡}
- Trinidad and Tobago U20
- Trinidad and Tobago U23
2016–	Trinidad and Tobago	26	(0)
- * Club domestic league appearances and goals as of 09:19, 29 May 2018 (UTC) ‡ National team caps and goals as of 24 October 2024 (UTC)

Adrian Jamal Foncette (born 10 October 1988) is a Trinidadian international footballer who plays for Police, as a goalkeeper.

== Club career ==
Born in Arima, Foncette has played club football for St. Ann's Rangers, Albany Great Danes, North East Stars, Western Mass Pioneers and Police.

== International career ==
After playing for their under-20 and under-23 teams, he made his senior international debut for Trinidad and Tobago in 2016. In Trinidad's last 2018 World Cup qualifying match, Foncette was described as a "key player" as he made a number of saves to maintain a 2–1 victory over the US, which eliminated them from qualifying for the World Cup.
