= Jair Toledo =

Peruvian footballer (born 1996)

Personal information
- Full name: Jorge Jair Toledo Bravo
- Date of birth: 22 June 1996 (age 30)
- Place of birth: Lima, Peru
- Height: 1.74 m (5 ft 9 in)
- Position: Right-back

Team information
- Current team: Juan Pablo II
- Number: 31

Youth career
- Melgar

Senior career*
Years	Team	Apps	(Gls)
2017	Melgar	9	(0)
2018–2019	Carlos A. Mannucci	16	(0)
2019	→ Juan Aurich (loan)	11	(0)
2020	Cusco	12	(0)
2021	Cantolao	8	(0)
2021	Juan Aurich	10	(0)
2022	Ayacucho	19	(1)
2023	Deportivo Municipal	25	(0)
2024	Comerciantes Unidos	30	(0)
2025–	Juan Pablo II	33	(0)
- * Club domestic league appearances and goals as of 13:12, 3 January 2026 (UTC)

Jorge Jair Toledo Bravo (born 22 June 1996) is a Peruvian footballer who plays as a right-back for Peruvian Primera División side Juan Pablo II.

== Club career ==
=== Melgar ===
After good performances in the 2016 U-20 Copa Libertadores, Toledo was promoted to FBC Melgar's first team for the 2017 season. He got his official debut for Melgar in the Peruvian Primera División on 5 March 2017 against Sport Rosario. He made 10 appearances for Melgar before he left the club at the end of the year.

=== Carlos A. Mannucci ===
On 6 March 2018, Toledo joined Peruvian Segunda División club Carlos A. Mannucci. He made his debut on 22 April 2018 against Deportivo Hualgayoc. Toledo was noted for 15 games in his first season and helped the club securing promotion to the Primera División. However, he was rarely used in the 2019 season, playing only 164 minutes for the team, and for that reason, he mostly played with the reserve team, where he was the captain. Therefore, he was loaned out to Segunda División club Juan Aurich on 28 August 2019 for the rest of the year. He left Carlos club at the end of 2019

=== Cusco ===
In January 2020, he moved to Cusco FC on a deal until the end of 2021. He made his debut on 3 February 2020, where he played all 90 minutes in a 0–2 defeat against Deportivo Binacional.

=== Cantolao ===
On 5 January 2021, Toledo signed with Cantolao. He got his debut on 13 March 2020 against Carlos A. Mannucci.

=== Return to Juan Aurich ===
In the summer 2021, Toledo returned to his former club Juan Aurich.

=== Ayacucho ===
Ahead of the 2022 season, Toledo joined Ayacucho FC.

=== Deportivo Municipal ===
After a year at Ayacucho, Toledo moved to Deportivo Municipal ahead of the 2023 season.

=== Comerciantes Unidos ===
In December 2023, Toledo signed with fellow league club Comerciantes Unidos.

=== Juan Pablo II ===
Ahead of the 2025 season, Toledo signed with newly promoted Peruvian Primera División side Juan Pablo II.
