= María Teresa Toral Peñaranda =

Spanish chemist and pharmacist

María Teresa Toral
- Born: María Teresa Toral Peñaranda; 20 May 1911; Madrid, Spain
- Died: 1994 (aged 82–83); Madrid, Spain
- Education: Central University of Madrid
- Scientific career
- Fields: Physical chemistry, printmaking
- Doctoral advisor: Enrique Moles

María Teresa Toral Peñaranda (Note: In this Spanish name, the first or paternal surname is Toral and the second or maternal family name is Peñaranda.) (20 May 1911 – 1994) was a Spanish chemist, pharmacist and printmaker. She worked with Enrique Moles in Madrid on atomic weight measurements during the 1930s, was twice imprisoned by Franco's government for supporting the Republic, and from 1956 lived in exile in Mexico, where she taught chemistry and built a second career as a printmaker.

== Early life and education ==
Toral was born in Madrid on 20 May 1911, the daughter of the notary José Toral Sagristá. She studied at the Central University of Madrid and graduated in both pharmacy and chemistry, finishing her chemistry degree in 1933 with the year's top prize.

== Scientific career ==
Toral joined the Instituto Nacional de Física y Química (INFQ) in Madrid as an assistant to Enrique Moles, whose group used gas-density methods to measure atomic and molecular weights with high precision. She built much of her own glassware. Her doctoral work dealt with the molar relations of carbon dioxide, oxygen and nitrous oxide and the atomic weights of carbon and nitrogen, and she published with Moles in the Anales de la Sociedad Española de Física y Química and in the Transactions of the Faraday Society. A 1936 fellowship to continue her studies in London was cut short by the Spanish Civil War.

== Civil War and imprisonment ==
Toral stayed in Madrid through the war and continued at the INFQ, which from 1938 was attached to the Republican Ministry of Defence. She was arrested in June 1939, accused along with other INFQ staff of producing war materiel for the Republic, and was held at the women's prison of Ventas in Madrid until her release on conditional liberty in June 1941.

In 1944 she took over a pharmacy on Calle Gravina in Madrid. According to her biographer Antonina Rodrigo, she used the back of the shop as a meeting point for the communist urban resistance. She was arrested again in December 1945. The prosecution asked for thirty years. The case attracted international attention and the Nobel laureate Irène Joliot-Curie attended the hearing as an observer. The sentence was reduced to two years, served at the women's prison in Segovia, and Toral was released in November 1947.

== Exile in Mexico ==
In 1956, after several years working at pharmaceutical laboratories in Aranjuez, Toral left Spain through France and settled in Mexico. She taught at the National Autonomous University of Mexico (UNAM) and the National Polytechnic Institute (IPN), where she held chairs in inorganic and physical chemistry from 1963, and translated scientific texts from English, French, German and Italian. In Mexico she married the composer Lan Adomian.

Toral took up printmaking in 1960 and made it a parallel career, drawing on her chemistry knowledge to work with metal plates. Several of her series were inspired by the poetry of León Felipe, Miguel Hernández, Antonio Machado, Federico García Lorca and Pablo Neruda. Her first solo show was at the Diana Gallery in Mexico City in 1963. Her work was later shown across Mexico, Chile, the United States and Israel, and a retrospective covering her first seven years of printmaking was held at the Salón de la Plástica Mexicana in 1967. Madrid first saw her work in 1975, and she returned to Spain in 1978 for a second show there. Her prints are held by the Museo de Arte Moderno in Mexico City and the Museo de Arte Contemporáneo in Morelia, among other collections.

She returned to Spain for good in 1994 and died in Madrid the same year, aged 83.

== Legacy ==
The first book-length study of Toral's life was a 2010 monograph by her brother Enrique Toral Peñaranda; Antonina Rodrigo's biography Una mujer silenciada. Mª Teresa Toral: ciencia, compromiso y exilio followed in 2012. In 2013 the former prison of Segovia, by then a cultural centre, hosted an exhibition of her prints titled Regreso. The Foundation of the Museo del Grabado Español Contemporáneo created the María Teresa Toral Prize for printmaking in 2010, and in 2022 the Spanish government established a national young researchers' prize in chemistry in her name, paired with the senior "Enrique Moles" prize named after her former mentor.

== See also ==
- List of women associated with Marie Curie and Irène Joliot-Curie
