= Peñaranda (surname) =

Peñaranda is a Spanish surname . Notable people with the surname include:

- Adalberto Peñaranda (born 1997), Venezuelan footballer
- Alejandro Peñaranda (1993–2018), Colombian footballer
- César Peñaranda (1915–2007), Peruvian cyclist
- Enrique Peñaranda (1892–1969), Bolivian general and politician
- Florentino Peñaranda (1876–1938), Filipino educator and politician
- Francisco Armero Peñaranda (1804-1866), Spanish general and politician
- Iván Peñaranda (born 1981), Spanish footballer
- Jairo Penaranda (born 1958), Colombian gridiron football player
- José María Peñaranda (1907–2006), Colombian musician and songwriter
- Luis Reyes Peñaranda (1911–?), Bolivian footballer
- María Teresa Toral Peñaranda (1911–1994), Spanish chemist, pharmacist, printmaker, political prisoner
- Raúl Peñaranda (born 1966), Bolivian journalist and political analyst
- Raúl Peñaranda (footballer) (born 1991), Colombian footballer
