= Rodrigo Rodríguez (footballer, born 1995) =

Uruguayan association football player

Personal information
- Full name: Rodrigo Gabriel Rodríguez Dubovich
- Date of birth: 25 November 1995 (age 30)
- Place of birth: Paysandú, Uruguay
- Height: 1.87 m (6 ft 2 in)
- Position: Goalkeeper

Team information
- Current team: Cerrito
- Number: 1

Senior career*
Years	Team	Apps	(Gls)
2012–2019	Liverpool	14	(0)
2019–2023	Juventud	89	(0)
2023–	Cerrito	1	(0)
- * Club domestic league appearances and goals as of 18:48, 12 March 2023 (UTC)

Rodrigo Gabriel Rodríguez Dubovich (born 25 November 1995) is a Uruguayan footballer who plays as a goalkeeper for Cerrito in the Uruguayan Segunda División.

== Career ==
=== Liverpool (Montevideo) ===
Rodríguez began his senior career with Montevideo-based Liverpool, progressing through the club's youth academy. In 2016, he served as a member of the under-20 team that finished runners-up in the U-20 Copa Libertadores. After starting goalkeepers Guillermo de Amores and Jorge Bava suffered injuries, Rodríguez made his senior league debut for the club, registering a clean sheet in a 0–0 draw with Miramar Misiones.

=== Juventud de Las Piedras ===
In July 2019, Rodríguez parted ways with Liverpool, and trialled with Primera División club Juventud. On 13 July 2019, he made his competitive debut for the club in a 2–2 draw with Danubio.

=== Cerrito ===
Ahead of the 2023 season, Rodríguez joined Cerrito. He made his debut for the club on 4 March 2023 in a 3–0 defeat to his former club Juventud.

== Career statistics ==
=== Club ===
As of match played 4 March 2023

Appearances and goals by club, season and competition
Club	Season	League			Continental		Other		Total	
Club	Season	Division	Apps	Goals	Apps	Goals	Apps	Goals	Apps	Goals
Liverpool	2012–13	Uruguayan Primera División	0	0	—		—		0	0
Liverpool	2014–15	Uruguayan Segunda División	3	0	—		—		3	0
Liverpool	2015–16	Uruguayan Primera División	1	0	—		—		1	0
Liverpool	2017	Uruguayan Primera División	8	0	0	0	—		8	0
Liverpool	2018	Uruguayan Primera División	2	0	—		—		2	0
Liverpool	2019	Uruguayan Primera División	0	0	0	0	—		0	0
Liverpool	Total		14	0	0	0	—		14	0
Juventud	2019	Uruguayan Primera División	20	0	—		—		20	0
Juventud	2020	Uruguayan Segunda División	21	0	—		2 (Note: Appearance(s) in Uruguayan Segunda División Promotion Playoffs)	0	23	0
Juventud	2021	Uruguayan Segunda División	22	0	—		—		22	0
Juventud	2022	Uruguayan Segunda División	26	0	—		—		26	0
Juventud	Total		89	0	—		2	0	91	0
Cerrito	2023	Uruguayan Segunda División	1	0	—		—		1	0
Career total			104	0	0	0	2	0	106	0
