= Axel Ochoa =

Argentine footballer

Personal information
- Full name: Axel Nicolás Ochoa
- Date of birth: 13 March 1996 (age 30)
- Place of birth: Argentina
- Height: 1.75 m (5 ft 9 in)
- Position: Left-back

Team information
- Current team: Belgrano (on loan from Atlanta)

Youth career
- Lanús

Senior career*
Years	Team	Apps	(Gls)
2017–	Atlanta	90	(1)
2021–	→ Belgrano (loan)	30	(0)
- * Club domestic league appearances and goals as of 19:56, 14 June 2022 (UTC)

Axel Nicolás Ochoa (born 13 March 1996) is an Argentine professional footballer who plays as a left-back for Primera Nacional side Belgrano, on loan from Atlanta.

== Career ==
Ochoa started his career in the youth ranks of Lanús, featuring for the club at the 2016 U-20 Copa Libertadores where he scored one goal (versus Liverpool) in four appearances as Lanús placed fourth. On 24 July 2017, Ochoa joined Primera B Metropolitana side Atlanta. He made his professional debut on 4 September during a match with Colegiales.

On 9 February 2021, Ochoa joined Belgrano on a one-year loan spell with a purchase option. In January 2022, the loan was extended with one more year.

== Career statistics ==
As of 4 May 2018.

Club statistics
Club	Season	League			Cup (Note: Includes the Copa Argentina)		League Cup		Continental		Other		Total	
Club	Season	Division	Apps	Goals	Apps	Goals	Apps	Goals	Apps	Goals	Apps	Goals	Apps	Goals
Atlanta	2017–18	Primera B Metropolitana	30	0	3	0	—		—		0	0	33	0
Career total			30	0	3	0	—		—		0	0	33	0
