= Toral (surname) =

Toral is a Spanish surname that may refer to:

- Francisco de Toral (1502–1571), Franciscan missionary in New Spain
- Hernan Crespo Toral (1937–2008), Ecuadorean architect, archeologist and museologist
- Janette Toral, Internet marketing specialist from the Philippines
- Jon Toral (born 1995), Spanish association football player
- Jorge Toral Azuela
- José de León Toral (1900–1929), Mexican assassin
- José Manuel Martínez Toral (born 1960), Spanish association football player
- Luis Roberto García Toral (born 1973), Spanish association football player
- Marcelino García Toral (born 1965), Spanish association football player
- María Teresa Toral Peñaranda (1911–1994), Spanish chemist, pharmacist, printmaker, political prisoner
- Mario Toral (born 1934), Chilean painter and photographer
- Remigio Crespo Toral (1860–1939), Ecuadorean writer
