= Alejandro Peñaranda =

Colombian footballer (1993-2018)

Personal information
- Full name: Alejandro Peñaranda Trujillo
- Date of birth: 4 November 1993
- Place of birth: Jamundí, Colombia
- Date of death: 1 June 2018 (aged 24)
- Place of death: Cali, Colombia
- Height: 1.78 m (5 ft 10 in)
- Position: Striker

Senior career*
Years	Team	Apps	(Gls)
2013	Atlético Nacional	1	(0)
2014–2016	América de Cali	24	(4)
2017–2018	Cortuluá	12	(0)
Total		37	(4)
- * Club domestic league appearances and goals

Alejandro Peñaranda Trujillo (4 November 1993 – 1 June 2018) was a Colombian professional footballer who played as a striker.

== Career ==
Born in Jamundí, Peñaranda played for Atlético Nacional, América de Cali and Cortuluá.

== Death ==
Peñaranda was shot and killed on 1 June 2018, while at the house of Cristian Alexis Borja, who was unharmed. Peñaranda's Cortuluá teammate Heissen Izquierdo was injured in the attack.
