= Heisen Izquierdo =

Colombian footballer (born 1995)

Personal information
- Full name: Heisen Hower Izquierdo Rentería
- Date of birth: 13 January 1995 (age 31)
- Place of birth: Cali, Colombia
- Height: 1.71 m (5 ft 7 in)
- Position: Midfielder

Senior career*
Years	Team	Apps	(Gls)
2013–2016	Cortuluá	10	(0)
2016–2017	Orsomarso	9	(2)
2018–2019	Cortuluá	12	(0)
- * Club domestic league appearances and goals as of 1 January 2020

Heisen Hower Izquierdo Rentería (born 13 January 1995) is a Colombian professional footballer who plays as a midfielder.

== Career ==
Born in Cali, Izquierdo has played for Cortuluá and Orsomarso.

== Personal life ==
On 1 June 2018, Izquierdo was shot and injured during an attack at Cristian Alexis Borja's house, which saw his Cortuluá teammate Alejandro Peñaranda die.
