= Alvin Jones (footballer) =

Trinidadian association football player

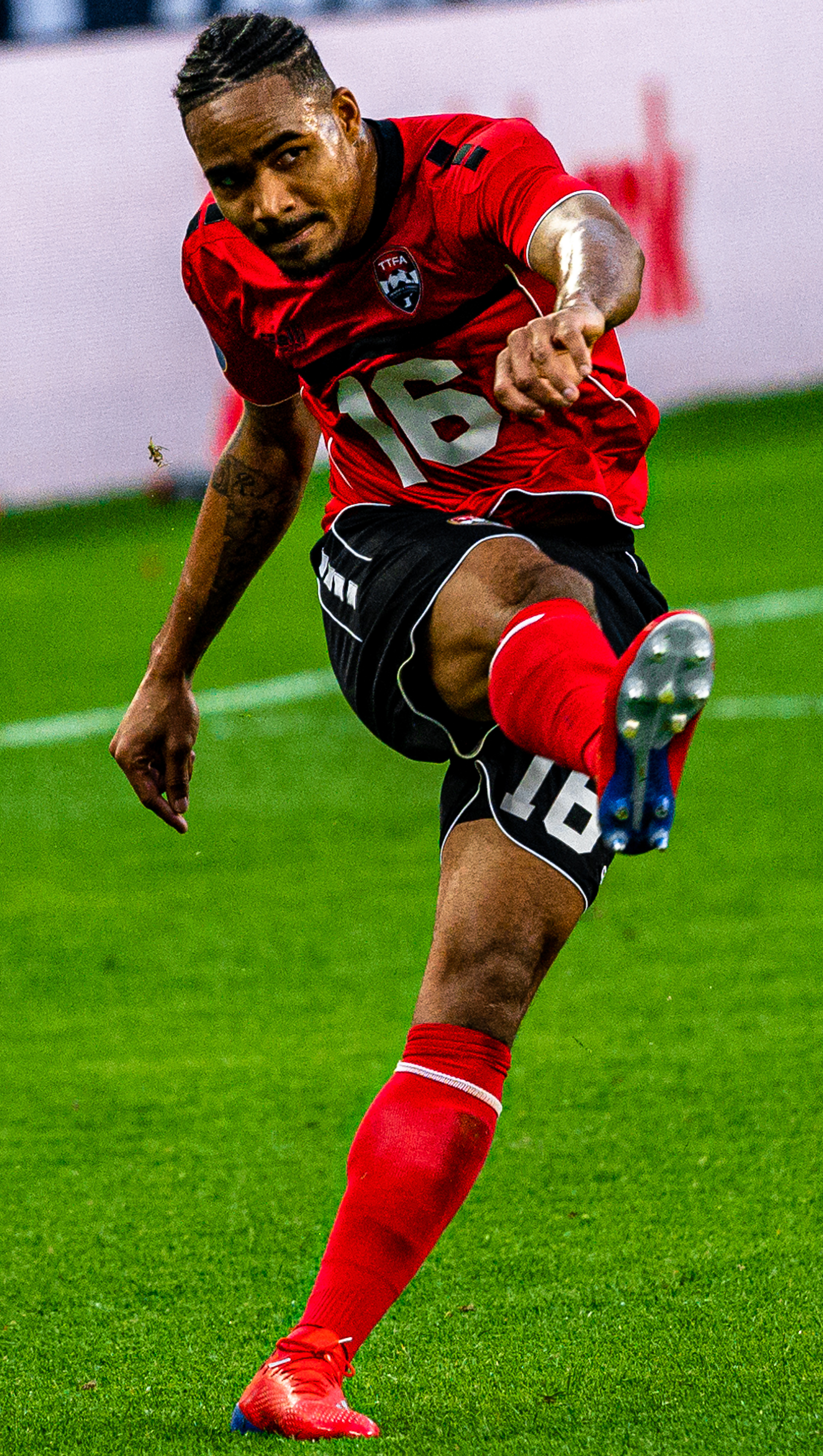
- Jones with Trinidad and Tobago at the 2019 CONCACAF Gold Cup

Personal information
- Full name: Alvin Jones
- Date of birth: 9 July 1994 (age 32)
- Place of birth: Port of Spain, Trinidad and Tobago
- Height: 1.83 m (6 ft 0 in)
- Position: Right-back

Team information
- Current team: Real Sociedad
- Number: 16

Senior career*
| Years | Team | Apps | (Gls) |
| 2012–2018 | W Connection | | (10) |
| 2019 | OKC Energy | 21 | (1) |
| 2020 | Real Salt Lake | 0 | (0) |
| 2020 | Real Monarchs | 1 | (0) |
| 2022 | Forward Madison | 17 | (1) |
| 2023 | Club Sando | | |
| 2023–2025 | Police | | |
| 2025– | Real Sociedad (Honduras) | 13 | (1) |

International career^{‡}
| 2012 | Trinidad and Tobago U20 | 6 | (0) |
| 2015 | Trinidad and Tobago U23 | 2 | (0) |
| 2014– | Trinidad and Tobago | 68 | (6) |
- * Club domestic league appearances and goals ‡ National team caps and goals as of 9 July 2026

Alvin Jones (born 9 July 1994) is a Trinidadian footballer who plays as a right-back who currently plays for Honduran Liga Nacional club Real Sociedad and the Trinidad and Tobago national team. He is the son of former footballer Kelvin Jones and the younger brother of fellow T&T international Joevin.

== International career ==
Jones played for the Trinidad and Tobago U23 team at the 2015 Pan American Games – Men's tournament. On October 10, 2017, he received international fame after his performance against the United States in a World Cup qualifying match, in which he scored from long distance for his first international goal. During the match, he also attempted a cross which resulted in an own goal and another long shot that he nearly scored. The match ended in a 2-1 victory for T&T, preventing the United States from qualifying for the 2018 World Cup in Russia. Six years later, he scored a long free kick in a 2-1 victory for T&T against the US, but it was not enough since they lost the first leg 3-0, losing 4-2 on aggregate.

=== International goals ===
Scores and results list Trinidad and Tobago's goal tally first.

| No. | Date | Venue | Opponent | Score | Result | Competition |
|---|---|---|---|---|---|---|
| 1. | 10 October 2017 | Ato Boldon Stadium, Couva, Trinidad and Tobago | United States | 2–0 | 2–1 | 2018 FIFA World Cup qualification |
| 2. | 11 June 2023 | Subaru Park, Chester, United States | Guatemala | 1–0 | 1–0 | Friendly |
| 3. | 25 June 2023 | DRV PNK Stadium, Fort Lauderdale, United States | Saint Kitts and Nevis | 1–0 | 3–0 | 2023 CONCACAF Gold Cup |
| 4. | 13 October 2023 | Hasely Crawford Stadium, Port of Spain, Trinidad and Tobago | Guatemala | 1–2 | 3–2 | 2023–24 CONCACAF Nations League A |
| 5. | 20 November 2023 | Hasely Crawford Stadium, Port of Spain, Trinidad and Tobago | United States | 2–1 | 2–1 | 2023–24 CONCACAF Nations League A |
| 6. | 8 June 2024 | SKNFA Technical Center, Basseterre, Saint Kitts and Nevis | Bahamas | 2–0 | 7–1 | 2026 FIFA World Cup qualification |

== Honours ==
W Connection

- TT Pro League: 2013–14
- FA Trophy: 2013–14
