= 2018 FIFA World Cup qualification – CONCACAF fifth round =

Tournament details
- Dates: 11 November 2016 – 10 October 2017
- Teams: 6 (from 1 confederation)

Tournament statistics
- Matches played: 30
- Goals scored: 76 (2.53 per match)
- Attendance: 840,331 (28,011 per match)
- Top scorer(s): (United States) Christian Pulisic (5 goals)

The fifth round (also known as the Hexagonal or Hex) of CONCACAF matches for 2018 FIFA World Cup qualification was played from 11 November 2016 to 10 October 2017. Mexico, Costa Rica, and Panama qualified for the 2018 FIFA World Cup, while Honduras advanced to the inter-confederation play-offs. The United States (who failed to qualify for the World Cup for the first time in 32 years) and Trinidad and Tobago were eliminated in this round.

== Format ==
A total of six teams which had advanced from the fourth round (the three group winners and the three group runners-up) played against each other home-and-away in a double round-robin format in a single group. The top three teams in the group qualified for the 2018 FIFA World Cup, and the fourth-placed team advanced to the inter-confederation play-offs to face the fifth-placed team from the AFC. This stage is referred to as the Hexagonal or Hex, and has been used by CONCACAF to determine its World Cup finals entrants since the qualification tournament for the 1998 FIFA World Cup. The United States, Mexico, and Costa Rica have qualified for every "Hex" since it first began in 1998.

The draw for the fifth round (to decide the fixtures) was held on 8 July 2016, 10:00 EDT (UTC−4), at the CONCACAF headquarters in Miami Beach, United States. As the draw was held before the fourth round was completed, only Mexico was assured a Hex spot as Group A winners of the fourth round qualifiers; the rest of the fourth round qualifiers were not known at the time of the draw.

== Qualified teams ==
Group (4th round)	Winners	Runners-up
A	Mexico	Honduras
B	Costa Rica	Panama
C	United States	Trinidad and Tobago

The draw position of each team (to decide the fixtures) was as follows.

Note: Bolded teams qualified for the World Cup. Honduras advanced to the inter-confederation play-offs.

Draw position	Team
1	United States
2	**Panama**
3	Honduras
4	**Costa Rica**
5	**Mexico**
6	Trinidad and Tobago

== Standings ==
Pos	Team	Pld	W	D	L	GF	GA	GD	Pts	Qualification	(Mexico)	(Costa Rica)	(Panama)	(Honduras)	(United States)	(Trinidad and Tobago)
1	Mexico	10	6	3	1	16	7	+9	21	Qualification to 2018 FIFA World Cup	—	2–0	1–0	3–0	1–1	3–1
2	Costa Rica	10	4	4	2	14	8	+6	16	Qualification to 2018 FIFA World Cup	1–1	—	0–0	1–1	4–0	2–1
3	Panama	10	3	4	3	9	10	−1	13	Qualification to 2018 FIFA World Cup	0–0	2–1	—	2–2	1–1	3–0
4	Honduras	10	3	4	3	13	19	−6	13	Advance to inter-confederation play-offs	3–2	1–1	0–1	—	1–1	3–1
5	United States	10	3	3	4	17	13	+4	12		1–2	0–2	4–0	6–0	—	2–0
6	Trinidad and Tobago	10	2	0	8	7	19	−12	6		0–1	0–2	1–0	1–2	2–1	—

Source: FIFA
Rules for classification: Qualification tiebreakers

== Matches ==
=== Matchday 1 ===
11 November 2016
14:35 UTC−6

Honduras	0–1	Panama
	Report (FIFA); Report (CONCACAF)	Escobar 22'

Estadio Olímpico Metropolitano, San Pedro Sula
Attendance: 38,000
Referee: Yadel Martínez (Cuba)

11 November 2016
19:05 UTC−4

Trinidad and Tobago	0–2	Costa Rica
	Report (FIFA); Report (CONCACAF)	Bolaños 65'; Matarrita 90+2'

Hasely Crawford Stadium, Port of Spain
Attendance: 13,500
Referee: Óscar Moncada (Honduras)

11 November 2016
20:01 UTC−5

United States	1–2	Mexico
Wood 49'	Report (FIFA); Report (CONCACAF)	Layún 20'; Márquez 89'

Mapfre Stadium, Columbus
Attendance: 24,650
Referee: Walter López (Guatemala)

=== Matchday 2 ===
15 November 2016
16:05 UTC−6

Honduras	3–1	Trinidad and Tobago
Quioto 16'; Izaguirre 19'; Hernández 81'	Report (FIFA); Report (CONCACAF)	Mitchell 52'

Estadio Olímpico Metropolitano, San Pedro Sula
Attendance: 32,900
Referee: Jair Marrufo (United States)

15 November 2016
20:05 UTC−6

Costa Rica	4–0	United States
Venegas 44'; Bolaños 68'; Campbell 74', 78'	Report (FIFA); Report (CONCACAF)

Estadio Nacional de Costa Rica, San José
Attendance: 35,400
Referee: César Ramos (Mexico)

15 November 2016
21:05 UTC−5

Panama	0–0	Mexico
	Report (FIFA); Report (CONCACAF)

Estadio Rommel Fernández, Panama City
Attendance: 26,500
Referee: Ricardo Montero (Costa Rica)

=== Matchday 3 ===
24 March 2017
19:00 UTC−4

Trinidad and Tobago	1–0	Panama
Molino 37'	Report (FIFA); Report (CONCACAF)

Hasely Crawford Stadium, Port of Spain
Attendance: 12,000
Referee: Melvin Matamoros (Honduras)

24 March 2017
19:50 UTC−6

Mexico	2–0	Costa Rica
J. Hernández 8'; Araujo 45'	Report (FIFA); Report (CONCACAF)

Estadio Azteca, Mexico City
Attendance: 61,697
Referee: John Pitti (Panama)

24 March 2017
19:55 UTC−7

United States	6–0	Honduras
Lletget 5'; Bradley 27'; Dempsey 32', 49', 54'; Pulisic 46'	Report (FIFA); Report (CONCACAF)

Avaya Stadium, San Jose
Attendance: 17,729
Referee: Walter López (Guatemala)

=== Matchday 4 ===
28 March 2017
15:00 UTC−6

Honduras	1–1	Costa Rica
Lozano 34'	Report (FIFA); Report (CONCACAF)	Waston 68'

Estadio Francisco Morazán, San Pedro Sula (Note: Honduras were sanctioned by FIFA to play one home match (against Costa Rica on 28 March 2017) away from Estadio Olímpico Metropolitano, San Pedro Sula, for several incidents during their home match against Panama.)
Attendance: 15,800
Referee: Joel Aguilar (El Salvador)

28 March 2017
19:00 UTC−4

Trinidad and Tobago	0–1	Mexico
	Report (FIFA); Report (CONCACAF)	D. Reyes 58'

Hasely Crawford Stadium, Port of Spain
Attendance: 14,822
Referee: Valdin Legister (Jamaica)

28 March 2017
21:05 UTC−5

Panama	1–1	United States
Gómez 43'	Report (FIFA); Report (CONCACAF)	Dempsey 39'

Estadio Rommel Fernández, Panama City
Attendance: 23,052
Referee: César Ramos (Mexico)

=== Matchday 5 ===
8 June 2017
18:00 UTC−6

United States	2–0	Trinidad and Tobago
Pulisic 52', 62'	Report (FIFA); Report (CONCACAF)

Dick's Sporting Goods Park, Commerce City
Attendance: 19,188
Referee: Óscar Moncada (Honduras)

8 June 2017
20:00 UTC−6

Costa Rica	0–0	Panama
	Report (FIFA); Report (CONCACAF)

Estadio Nacional de Costa Rica, San José
Attendance: 35,040
Referee: Jair Marrufo (United States)

8 June 2017
21:00 UTC−5

Mexico	3–0	Honduras
Alanís 35'; Lozano 63'; Jiménez 66'	Report (FIFA); Report (CONCACAF)

Estadio Azteca, Mexico City
Attendance: 38,565
Referee: Drew Fischer (Canada)

=== Matchday 6 ===
11 June 2017 (Note: The Mexico v United States match was brought forward from 13 June 2017 to accommodate Mexico's participation in the 2017 FIFA Confederations Cup.)
19:30 UTC−5

Mexico	1–1	United States
Vela 23'	Report (FIFA); Report (CONCACAF)	Bradley 6'

Estadio Azteca, Mexico City
Attendance: 71,537
Referee: Joel Aguilar (El Salvador)

13 June 2017
20:35 UTC−5

Panama	2–2	Honduras
Pérez 41'; R. Torres 90'	Report (FIFA); Report (CONCACAF)	Quioto 5'; Elis 66'

Estadio Rommel Fernández, Panama City
Attendance: 25,900
Referee: Roberto García (Mexico)

13 June 2017
20:00 UTC−6

Costa Rica	2–1	Trinidad and Tobago
Calvo 1'; Ruiz 44'	Report (FIFA); Report (CONCACAF)	Molino 35'

Estadio Nacional de Costa Rica, San José
Attendance: 34,429
Referee: Yadel Martínez (Cuba)

=== Matchday 7 ===
1 September 2017
18:55 UTC−4

United States	0–2	Costa Rica
	Report (FIFA); Report (CONCACAF)	Ureña 30', 82'

Red Bull Arena, Harrison
Attendance: 26,500
Referee: John Pitti (Panama)

1 September 2017
20:00 UTC−4

Trinidad and Tobago	1–2	Honduras
J. Jones 67' (pen.)	Report (FIFA); Report (CONCACAF)	A. López 7'; Elis 16'

Ato Boldon Stadium, Couva
Attendance: 5,002
Referee: Fernando Guerrero (Mexico)

1 September 2017
20:30 UTC−5

Mexico	1–0	Panama
Lozano 53'	Report (FIFA); Report (CONCACAF)

Estadio Azteca, Mexico City
Attendance: 37,845
Referee: Walter López (Guatemala)

=== Matchday 8 ===
5 September 2017
15:36 UTC−6

Honduras	1–1	United States
Quioto 27'	Report (FIFA); Report (CONCACAF)	Wood 85'

Estadio Olímpico Metropolitano, San Pedro Sula
Attendance: 38,000
Referee: Joel Aguilar (El Salvador)

5 September 2017
20:05 UTC−6

Costa Rica	1–1	Mexico
Ureña 83'	Report (FIFA); Report (CONCACAF)	Gamboa 42' (o.g.)

Estadio Nacional de Costa Rica, San José
Attendance: 34,420
Referee: Mark Geiger (United States)

5 September 2017
21:05 UTC−5

Panama	3–0	Trinidad and Tobago
G. Torres 39'; Mitchell 58' (o.g.); Arroyo 85'	Report (FIFA); Report (CONCACAF)

Estadio Rommel Fernández, Panama City
Attendance: 17,500
Referee: Henry Bejarano (Costa Rica)

=== Matchday 9 ===
6 October 2017
19:35 UTC−4

United States	4–0	Panama
Pulisic 8'; Altidore 19', 43' (pen.); Wood 63'	Report (FIFA); Report (CONCACAF)

Orlando City Stadium, Orlando
Attendance: 25,303
Referee: Roberto García (Mexico)

6 October 2017
20:40 UTC−5

Mexico	3–1	Trinidad and Tobago
Lozano 78'; J. Hernández 88'; Herrera 90+4'	Report (FIFA); Report (CONCACAF)	Winchester 66'

Estadio Alfonso Lastras, San Luis Potosí
Attendance: 25,111
Referee: Kimbell Ward (Saint Kitts and Nevis)

7 October 2017 (Note: The Costa Rica v Honduras match was originally scheduled for 6 October 2017, 20:00 local time, but was postponed to the next day, 16:00 local time, because of Tropical Storm Nate.)
16:00 UTC−6

Costa Rica	1–1	Honduras
Waston 90+5'	Report (FIFA); Report (CONCACAF)	Hernández 66'

Estadio Nacional de Costa Rica, San José
Attendance: 24,948
Referee: César Ramos (Mexico)

=== Matchday 10 ===
10 October 2017
18:00 UTC−6

Honduras	3–2	Mexico
Elis 34'; Ochoa 53' (o.g.); Quioto 60'	Report (FIFA); Report (CONCACAF)	Peralta 17'; Vela 37'

Estadio Olímpico Metropolitano, San Pedro Sula
Attendance: 37,000
Referee: Joel Aguilar (El Salvador)

10 October 2017
19:00 UTC−5

Panama	2–1	Costa Rica
G. Torres 53'; R. Torres 88'	Report (FIFA); Report (CONCACAF)	Venegas 36'

Estadio Rommel Fernández, Panama City
Attendance: 26,503
Referee: Walter López (Guatemala)

10 October 2017
20:00 UTC−4

Trinidad and Tobago	2–1	United States
Gonzalez 17' (o.g.); A. Jones 37'	Report (FIFA); Report (CONCACAF)	Pulisic 47'

Ato Boldon Stadium, Couva
Attendance: 1,500
Referee: Marlon Mejía (El Salvador)

== Goalscorers ==
There were 76 goals scored in 30 matches, for an average of 2.53 goals per match.

5 goals

- (United States) Christian Pulisic

4 goals

- (Honduras) Romell Quioto
- (United States) Clint Dempsey

3 goals

- (Costa Rica) Marco Ureña
- (Honduras) Alberth Elis
- (Mexico) Hirving Lozano
- (United States) Bobby Wood

2 goals

- (Costa Rica) Christian Bolaños
- (Costa Rica) Joel Campbell
- (Costa Rica) Johan Venegas
- (Costa Rica) Kendall Waston
- (Honduras) Eddie Hernández
- (Mexico) Javier Hernández
- (Mexico) Carlos Vela
- (Panama) Gabriel Torres
- (Panama) Román Torres
- (Trinidad and Tobago) Kevin Molino
- (United States) Jozy Altidore
- (United States) Michael Bradley

1 goal

- (Costa Rica) Francisco Calvo
- (Costa Rica) Rónald Matarrita
- (Costa Rica) Bryan Ruiz
- (Honduras) Emilio Izaguirre
- (Honduras) Alexander López
- (Honduras) Anthony Lozano
- (Mexico) Oswaldo Alanís
- (Mexico) Néstor Araujo
- (Mexico) Héctor Herrera
- (Mexico) Raúl Jiménez
- (Mexico) Miguel Layún
- (Mexico) Rafael Márquez
- (Mexico) Oribe Peralta
- (Mexico) Diego Reyes
- (Panama) Abdiel Arroyo
- (Panama) Fidel Escobar
- (Panama) Gabriel Gómez
- (Panama) Blas Pérez
- (Trinidad and Tobago) Alvin Jones
- (Trinidad and Tobago) Joevin Jones
- (Trinidad and Tobago) Carlyle Mitchell
- (Trinidad and Tobago) Shahdon Winchester
- (United States) Sebastian Lletget

1 own goal

- (Costa Rica) Cristian Gamboa (against Mexico)
- (Mexico) Guillermo Ochoa (against Honduras)
- (Trinidad and Tobago) Carlyle Mitchell (against Panama)
- (United States) Omar Gonzalez (against Trinidad and Tobago)
