= Toral (given name) =

Toral is a given name. Notable people with the name include:

- José Toral y Velázquez (1832–1904), Spanish Army general
- Toral Rasputra (born 1987), Indian television actress
