= Cristian Sención =

Uruguayan football player (born 1996)

Personal information
- Full name: Cristian Emanuel Sención Rodríguez
- Date of birth: 28 January 1996 (age 30)
- Place of birth: Montevideo, Uruguay
- Height: 1.79 m (5 ft 10 in)
- Position: Midfielder

Team information
- Current team: Union Magdalena
- Number: 16

Youth career
- 2009–2015: Liverpool Montevideo

Senior career*
Years	Team	Apps	(Gls)
2015–2019	Liverpool Montevideo	41	(2)
2019	→ Juventud (loan)	17	(0)
2020–2021	Rampla Juniors	19	(0)
2021–2022	Albion	34	(1)
2022–	Gualaceo	3	(0)
- * Club domestic league appearances and goals as of 14:38, 14 February 2023 (UTC)

Cristian Emanuel Sención Rodríguez (born 28 January 1996) is a Uruguayan footballer who plays as a midfielder for Unión Magdalena in the Categoría Primera A.
