= 2018 FIFA World Cup qualification (CONCACAF–AFC play-off) =

- Event: 2018 FIFA World Cup qualification
Honduras	Australia
(Honduras)	(Australia)
1	3
- on aggregate

First leg
Honduras	Australia
0	0
- Date: 10 November 2017
- Venue: Estadio Olímpico Metropolitano, San Pedro Sula
- Referee: Daniele Orsato (Italy)
- Attendance: 38,000

Second leg
Australia	Honduras
3	1
- Date: 15 November 2017
- Venue: Stadium Australia, Sydney
- Referee: Néstor Pitana (Argentina)
- Attendance: 77,060

The 2018 FIFA World Cup CONCACAF–AFC qualification play-off was a two-legged home-and-away tie between the fourth-placed team from the CONCACAF fifth round, Honduras, and the winner of the AFC fourth round play-off, Australia.

The matches were played on 10 and 15 November 2017. After a 0–0 draw in the opening leg at Estadio Olímpico Metropolitano, Australia defeated Honduras 3–1 in the second leg at Stadium Australia, winning the tie by the same margin on aggregate. Australia therefore qualified for the 2018 FIFA World Cup finals, reaching the tournament for the fifth time, and fourth in succession.

== Overview ==
The play-off marked the sixth inter-confederation play-off participation for Australia after previously defeating Uruguay in 2005, losing to Uruguay in 2001, losing to Iran in 1997, losing to Argentina after defeating Canada in 1993, and losing to Scotland in 1985. This was also their first inter-confederation play-off appearance as an AFC member, their previous appearances being as an OFC member.

This was Honduras' first participation in the inter-confederation play-offs; they finished fourth in the final round of the CONCACAF qualification after the United States lost to Trinidad and Tobago 2–1, which caused the United States to not qualify for the World Cup for the first time since 1986.

The draw for the order in which the two matches would be played was held by FIFA on 25 July 2015 at the World Cup Preliminary Draw.

== First leg ==
10 November 2017
16:00 UTC−6
First leg

Honduras	0–0	Australia
	Report

Estadio Olímpico Metropolitano, San Pedro Sula
Attendance: 38,000
Referee: Daniele Orsato (Italy)

Honduras	Australia

GK	22	Donis Escober
CB	21	Brayan Beckeles	(yellow card) 19'
CB	23	Johnny Palacios	(yellow card) 37'
CB	3	Henry Figueroa
RM	9	Anthony Lozano		(substituted off) 73'
CM	20	Jorge Claros	(yellow card) 78'
CM	8	Alfredo Mejía
LM	7	Emilio Izaguirre (c)
RF	11	Carlos Lanza		(substituted off) 60'
CF	12	Romell Quioto
LF	16	Luis López		(substituted off) 66'
Substitutions:
FW	17	Michaell Chirinos		(substituted on) 60'
MF	10	Mario Martínez	(yellow card) 90+3'	(substituted on) 66'
FW	13	Carlo Costly		(substituted on) 73'
Manager:
(Colombia) Jorge Luis Pinto

GK	1	Mathew Ryan
RB	8	Bailey Wright
CB	20	Trent Sainsbury	(yellow card) 48'
CB	15	Mile Jedinak (c)
LB	6	Matthew Jurman	(yellow card) 47'
CM	22	Jackson Irvine		(substituted off) 74'
CM	21	Massimo Luongo	(yellow card) 87'
CM	13	Aaron Mooy
RF	7	Josh Risdon	(yellow card) 39'	(substituted off) 84'
CF	9	Tomi Juric		(substituted off) 89'
LF	16	Aziz Behich
Substitutions:
MF	23	Tom Rogic		(substituted on) 74'
DF	2	Miloš Degenek		(substituted on) 84'
FW	17	Nikita Rukavytsya		(substituted on) 89'
Manager:
Ange Postecoglou

Assistant referees:
Lorenzo Manganelli (Italy)
Riccardo di Fiore (Italy)
Fourth official:
Paolo Tagliavento (Italy)

== Second leg ==
15 November 2017
20:00 UTC+11
Second leg

Australia	3–1	Honduras
Jedinak 54', 72' (pen.), 85' (pen.)	Report	Elis 90+3'

Stadium Australia, Sydney
Attendance: 77,060
Referee: Néstor Pitana (Argentina)

Australia	Honduras

GK	1	Mathew Ryan
RB	8	Bailey Wright
CB	20	Trent Sainsbury	(yellow card) 88'
CB	5	Mark Milligan		(substituted off) 89'
LB	6	Matthew Jurman	(yellow card) 2'
CM	15	Mile Jedinak (c)
CM	13	Aaron Mooy	(yellow card) 45+2'
RW	7	Mathew Leckie	(yellow card) 81'
AM	23	Tom Rogic		(substituted off) 77'
LW	16	Aziz Behich
CF	4	Tim Cahill		(substituted off) 66'
Substitutions:
FW	9	Tomi Juric		(substituted on) 66'
FW	10	Robbie Kruse		(substituted on) 77'
MF	14	James Troisi		(substituted on) 89'
Manager:
Ange Postecoglou

GK	22	Donis Escober
CB	21	Brayan Beckeles
CB	23	Johnny Palacios	(yellow card) 84'
CB	5	Éver Alvarado
RM	17	Alberth Elis
CM	20	Jorge Claros	(yellow card) 57'
CM	6	Bryan Acosta
LM	3	Maynor Figueroa (c)	(yellow card) 19'
RF	9	Anthony Lozano
CF	12	Romell Quioto		(substituted off) 75'
LF	7	Emilio Izaguirre		(substituted off) 42'
Substitutions:
DF	4	Henry Figueroa		(substituted on) 42'	(substituted off) 73'
MF	10	Mario Martínez		(substituted on) 73'
FW	11	Eddie Hernández		(substituted on) 75'
Manager:
(Colombia) Jorge Luis Pinto

Assistant referees:
Hernán Maidana (Argentina)
Juan Pablo Belatti (Argentina)
Fourth official:
Patricio Loustau (Argentina)
