= Rodrigo Rodríguez (footballer, born 1990) =

Bolivian footballer

Personal information
- Full name: Rodrigo Rodríguez Cortez
- Date of birth: 4 July 1990 (age 36)
- Position: Midfielder

Senior career*
Years	Team	Apps	(Gls)
2016-2019	Oriente Petrolero	23	(4)
2019	Club Destroyers	16	(4)

International career
2018	Bolivia	3	(0)
- * Club domestic league appearances and goals as of 00:15, 30 October 2022 (UTC)

Rodrigo Rodriguez (born July 4, 1990) is a Bolivian professional footballer who last played for Club Destroyers in the Bolivian Primera División. On 28 May 2018 he made his debut for Bolivia against the United States men's national team in Pennsylvania.
