= Cristian Borja (footballer, born 1993) =

Colombian footballer (born 1993)

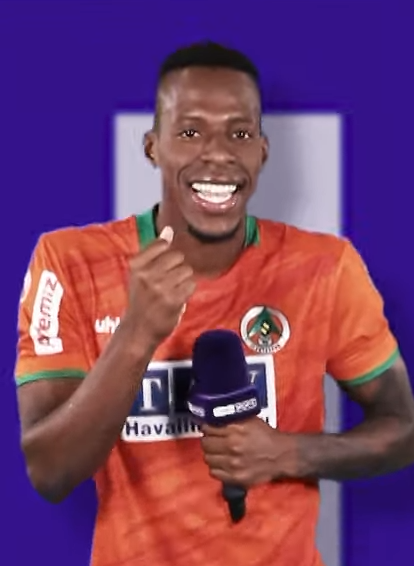
- Borja with Alanyaspor in 2021

Personal information
- Full name: Cristian Alexis Borja González
- Date of birth: 18 February 1993 (age 33)
- Place of birth: Cali, Colombia
- Height: 1.80 m (5 ft 11 in)
- Positions: Left-back; centre-back

Team information
- Current team: América
- Number: 26

Youth career
- Cortuluá

Senior career*
Years	Team	Apps	(Gls)
2015–2017	Cortuluá	47	(1)
2016–2017	→ Santa Fe (loan)	28	(0)
2018–2019	Toluca	37	(1)
2019–2021	Sporting CP	36	(1)
2021–2024	Braga	57	(2)
2021–2022	→ Alanyaspor (loan)	28	(1)
2024–	América	71	(4)

International career^{‡}
2015–2016	Colombia Olympic	9	(0)
2018–	Colombia	8	(0)
- * Club domestic league appearances and goals as of 30 August 2025 ‡ National team caps and goals as of 6 June 2025

Cristian Alexis Borja González (born 18 February 1993) is a Colombian professional footballer who plays for Liga MX club América and the Colombia national team. Mainly a left-back, he can also play as a central defender.

== Club career ==
In 2019, Borja was transferred from Toluca to Sporting CP. In February 2021, he joined Braga.

== International career ==
Borja was named in the Colombia national team's provisional squad for Copa América Centenario but was cut from the final squad. He later appeared for Colombia at the 2016 Summer Olympics.

Borja was included in the final squad for the 2019 Copa América, acting as a backup to William Tesillo during the tournament.

== Personal life ==
On 1 June 2018, Borja's house was attacked by gunmen; he was unhurt but fellow footballer Alejandro Peñaranda was killed and Heisen Izquierdo was injured. He has a daughter named Noah who was born in March 2020.

== Career statistics ==
=== Club ===
As of match played on 30 August 2025

Appearances and goals by club, season and competition
Club	Season	League			National cup		League cup		Continental		Other		Total	
Club	Season	Division	Apps	Goals	Apps	Goals	Apps	Goals	Apps	Goals	Apps	Goals	Apps	Goals
Cortuluá	2015	Categoría Primera	34	1	3	0	—		—		—		37	1
Cortuluá	2017	Categoría Primera	13	1	—		—		—		—		13	1
Cortuluá	Total		47	1	3	0	—		—		—		50	2
Santa Fe (loan)	2016	Categoría Primera	22	0	2	0	—		5 (Note: Three appearances in Copa Libertadores, two appearances in Copa Sudamericana)	0	—		29	0
Santa Fe (loan)	2017	Categoría Primera	6	0	—		—		—		—		6	0
Santa Fe (loan)	Total		28	0	2	0	—		5	0	—		35	0
Toluca	2017–18	Liga MX	19	1	3	0	—		—		—		22	1
Toluca	2018–19	Liga MX	18	0	1	0	—		—		—		19	0
Toluca	Total		37	1	4	0	—		—		—		41	1
Sporting	2018–19	Primeira Liga	11	0	2	0	0	0	1 (Note: Appearance(s) in UEFA Europa League)	0	—		14	0
Sporting	2019–20	Primeira Liga	23	1	1	0	1	0	4	0	1 (Note: Appearance in Supertaça Cândido de Oliveira)	0	30	1
Sporting	2020–21	Primeira Liga	2	0	2	0	1	0	0	0	0	0	5	0
Sporting	Total		36	1	5	0	2	0	5	0	1	0	49	1
Braga	2020–21	Primeira Liga	13	1	2	0	—		2	0	—		17	1
Braga	2022–23	Primeira Liga	14	0	2	0	2	0	3 (Note: Two appearances in UEFA Europa League, one appearance in UEFA Europa Conference League)	0	—		22	0
Braga	2023–24	Primeira Liga	30	1	1	0	3	0	8 (Note: Six appearances in UEFA Champions League, two appearances in UEFA Europa League)	0	—		42	1
Braga	Total		57	2	5	0	5	0	13	0	—		80	2
Alanyaspor (loan)	2021–22	Süper Lig	28	1	5	0	—		—		—		33	1
América	2024–25	Liga MX	34	3	0	0	—		4 (Note: Appearances in CONCACAF Champions Cup)	0	5 (Note: Three appearances in Leagues Cup, one appearance in Campeones Cup, one appearance in FIFA Club World Cup)	0	43	3
América	2025–26	Liga MX	6	0	0	0	—		0	0	2 (Note: Appearances in Leagues Cup)	0	8	0
América	Total		40	3	0	0	—		4	0	7	0	51	3
Career total			273	10	24	0	8	0	27	0	8	0	340	10

=== International ===
As of match played on 6 June 2025

Appearances and goals by national team and year
National team	Year	Apps	Goals
Colombia	2018	2	0
Colombia	2019	3	0
Colombia	2020	0	0
Colombia	2021	0	0
Colombia	2022	0	0
Colombia	2023	1	0
Colombia	2024	1	0
Colombia	2025	1	0
Total		8	0

== Honours ==
Sporting

- Primeira Liga: 2020–21
- Taça de Portugal: 2018–19
- Taça da Liga: 2020–21

Braga

- Taça de Portugal: 2020–21
- Taça da Liga: 2023–24

América

- Liga MX: Apertura 2024
- Campeones Cup: 2024
