= Honduras national football team results (2010–2019) =

Honduras
2010–19 season

This is a list of the Honduras national football team results from 2010 to 2019.

== 2010 ==
23 January 2010 Friendly	United States	1–3	Honduras	Carson, United States
18:10 PST	Goodson 69'		19' Pavón; 37' Palacios; 52' Espinoza	Stadium: Home Depot Center; Attendance: 18,626; Referee: Benito Archundia (MEX); Record: 4–6–11 (21:33)

3 March 2010 Friendly	Turkey	2–0	Honduras	Istanbul, Turkey
20:00 EET	Güngör 41'; Altıntop 55'			Stadium: Atatürk Olympic Stadium; Attendance: 22,000; Referee: Pavel Olsiak (SRB); Record: 0–0–2 (0:3)

21 April 2010 Friendly	Honduras	0–1	Venezuela	San Pedro Sula, Honduras
19:30 CST			51' Flores	Stadium: Estadio Olímpico Metropolitano; Attendance: 35,000; Referee: Roberto Moreno (PAN); Record: 1–2–4 (5:8)

27 May 2010 Friendly	Belarus	2–2	Honduras	Villach, Austria
19:00 CET	Putsila 56' 60'		25' de León; 71' Welcome	Stadium: Stadion Lind; Attendance: 400; Referee: René Eisner (AUT); Record: 0–1–0 (2:2)

2 June 2010 Friendly	Azerbaijan	0–0	Honduras	Zell am See, Austria
18:30 CET				Stadium: Alois Latini Stadion; Attendance: 500; Referee: Oliver Drachta (AUT); Record: 0–1–0 (0:0)

5 June 2010 Friendly	Honduras	0–3	Romania	Sankt Veit an der Glan, Austria
CET			20' Niculae; 45' Florescu; 76' (pen.) Rădoi	Stadium: Jacques Lemans Arena; Attendance: 1,500; Referee: Gerhard Grobelnik (AUT); Record: 0–3–1 (3:6)

16 June 2010 FWC	Chile	1–0	Honduras	Nelspruit, South Africa
13:30 SAST	Beausejour 34'			Stadium: Mbombela Stadium; Attendance: 32,664; Referee: Eddy Maillet (SEY); Record: 2–0–3 (8:9)

21 June 2010 FWC	Honduras	0–2	Spain	Johannesburg, South Africa
20:30 SAST			17' 51' Villa	Stadium: Ellis Park Stadium; Attendance: 54,386; Referee: Yuichi Nishimura (JPN); Record: 0–1–1 (1:3)

25 June 2010 FWC	Honduras	0–0	Switzerland	Bloemfontein, South Africa
20:30 SAST				Stadium: Free State Stadium; Attendance: 28,042; Referee: Héctor Baldassi (ARG); Record: 0–1–0 (0:0)

4 September 2010 Friendly; CI	El Salvador	2–2 (3–4 p)	Honduras	Los Angeles, United States
20:00 PST	Zelaya 41' 90' (pen.)		57' García; 86' Rojas	Stadium: Los Angeles Memorial Coliseum; Attendance: 15,000; Referee: Sorin Stoica (USA); Record: 30–15–16 (99:66)
	Penalties
	Zelaya (penalty missed); Castillo (penalty scored); Alas (penalty scored); Martin (penalty scored); Corrales (penalty missed)		(penalty scored) Mendoza; (penalty scored) J. García; (penalty missed) Ó. García; (penalty scored) Rojas; (penalty scored) Claros

7 September 2010 Friendly	Canada	2–1	Honduras	Montreal, Canada
19:30 EST	Simpson 19'; McKenna 42'		32' Norales	Stadium: Saputo Stadium; Attendance: 7,525; Referee: Record: 9–4–6 (30:25)

9 October 2010 Friendly	New Zealand	1–1	Honduras	Auckland, New Zealand
19:30 NZST	Wood 45+1'		64' Martínez	Stadium: North Harbour Stadium; Attendance: 18,953; Referee: Peter O'Leary (NZL); Record: 0–1–0 (1:1)

12 October 2010 Friendly	Guatemala	0–2	Honduras	Los Angeles, United States
PST			21' Rojas; 81' Welcome	Stadium: Los Angeles Memorial Coliseum; Attendance: 10,000; Referee: Record: 17–17–12 (54:52)

17 November 2010 Friendly	Panama	2–0	Honduras	Panama City, Panama
20:30 EST	Tejada 24'; Haywood 52'			Stadium: Estadio Rommel Fernández; Attendance: 3,646; Referee: Hugo Cruz (CRC); Record: 23–6–8 (62:21)

18 December 2010 Friendly	Honduras	2–1	Panama	San Pedro Sula, Honduras
19:00 CST	Leverón 7' 44'		41' Aguilar	Stadium: Estadio Olímpico Metropolitano; Attendance: 3,000; Referee: Elmar Rodas (GUA); Record: 24–6–8 (64:22)

28 December 2010 Catalonia International Trophy	Catalonia	4–0	Honduras	Barcelona, Spain
19:00 CET	Corominas 27'; García 49'; Krkić 60' 70'			Stadium: Estadi Olímpic Lluís Companys; Attendance: 28,150; Referee: Xavier Estrada (Catalonia); Record: 0–0–1 (0:4)

== 2011 ==
In January 2011, Honduras won its third Copa Centroamericana and their first one since 1995.

14 January 2011 CC	Costa Rica	1–1	Honduras	Panama City, Panama
19:00 EST	Núñez 42'		90+1' Núñez	Stadium: Estadio Rommel Fernández; Attendance: 6,000; Referee: Roberto García (MEX); Record: 16–17–21 (71:98)

18 January 2011 CC	Guatemala	1–3	Honduras	Panama City, Panama
19:00 EST	Ramírez 24'		13' Núñez; 42' 89' Claros	Stadium: Estadio Rommel Fernández; Attendance: 500; Referee: Joel Aguilar (SLV); Record: 18–17–12 (57:53)

21 January 2011 CC	El Salvador	0–2	Honduras	Panama City, Panama
18:30 EST			77' Leverón; 90+3' Chávez	Stadium: Estadio Rommel Fernández; Attendance: 5,000; Referee: Wálter Quesada (CRC); Record: 31–15–16 (101:66)

23 January 2011 CC	Costa Rica	1–2	Honduras	Panama City, Panama
18:00 EST	Ureña 73'		8' W. Martínez; 53' E. Martínez	Stadium: Estadio Rommel Fernández; Attendance: 2,000; Referee: Walter López (GUA); Record: 17–17–21 (73:99)

9 February 2011 Friendly	Honduras	1–1 (4–5 p)	Ecuador	La Ceiba, Honduras
19:30 CST	Bengtson 8'		12' Palacios	Stadium: Estadio Nilmo Edwards; Attendance: 15,100; Referee: Walter López (GUA); Record: 2–6–2 (10:9)
	Penalties
	Núñez (penalty scored); Figueroa (penalty scored); Bengtson (penalty missed); Leverón (penalty scored); Claros (penalty scored); Thomas (penalty missed)		(penalty scored) Guagua; (penalty scored) Noboa; (penalty scored) J. Ayoví; (penalty missed) Quiñónez; (penalty scored) W. Ayoví; (penalty scored) Mina

25 March 2011 Friendly	South Korea	4–0	Honduras	Seoul, South Korea
20:00 KST	Jung-soo 28'; Jung-woo 43'; Chu-young 82'; Keun-ho 90'			Stadium: Seoul World Cup Stadium; Attendance: 31,224; Referee: Ryuji Sato (JPN); Record: 0–0–2 (0:7)

29 March 2011 Friendly	China	3–0	Honduras	Wuhan, China
19:30 CST	Bowen 17'; Xu 37' 86'			Stadium: Wuhan Sports Center Stadium; Attendance: 10,000; Referee: Masaaki Toma (JPN); Record: 1–0–1 (1:3)

29 May 2011 Friendly	El Salvador	2–2	Honduras	Houston, United States
17:30 CST	Zelaya 72'; Corrales 75'		44' Costly; 50' (pen.) Bengtson	Stadium: Robertson Stadium; Attendance: 25,380; Referee: Armando Villarroel (USA); Record: 31–16–16 (103:68)

6 June 2011 CGC	Honduras	0–0	Guatemala	Carson, United States
20:00 PST				Stadium: Home Depot Center; Attendance: 21,507; Referee: Francisco Chacón (MEX); Record: 18–18–12 (57:53)

10 June 2011 CGC	Grenada	1–7	Honduras	Miami, United States
21:00 EST	Murray 20'		26' 37' Bengtson; 28' 67' 71' Costly; 89' Martínez; 90+3' Mejía	Stadium: FIU Stadium; Attendance: 18,057; Referee: David Gantar (CAN); Record: 2–0–0 (11:1)

13 June 2011 CGC	Honduras	0–1	Jamaica	Harrison, United States
21:00 EST			36' Johnson	Stadium: Red Bull Arena; Attendance: 25,000; Referee: Joel Aguilar (SLV); Record: 10–4–6 (38:21)

18 June 2011 CGC	Costa Rica	1–1 (2–4 p)	Honduras	East Rutherford, United States
17:00 EST	Marshall 56'		49' Bengtson	Stadium: New Meadowlands Stadium; Attendance: 78,807; Referee: Roberto Moreno (PAN); Record: 17–18–21 (74:100)
	Penalties
	Borges (penalty missed); Ruiz (penalty scored); Saborío (penalty missed); Campbell (penalty scored)		(penalty scored) Costly; (penalty scored) Bernárdez; (penalty scored) Palacios; (penalty scored) Bengtson

22 June 2011 CGC	Honduras	0–2	Mexico	Houston, United States
22:00 CST			93' de Nigris; 99' Hernández	Stadium: Reliant Stadium; Attendance: 70,627; Referee: Walter López (GUA); Record: 6–5–19 (27:58)

10 August 2011 Friendly	Honduras	2–0	Venezuela	Fort Lauderdale, United States
20:45 EST	Costly 57' 68'			Stadium: Lockhart Stadium; Attendance: 20,000; Referee: Terry Vaughn (USA); Record: 2–2–4 (7:8)

3 September 2011 Friendly	Colombia	2–0	Honduras	Harrison, United States
20:00 EST	Gutiérrez 25' (pen.) 72'			Stadium: Red Bull Arena; Attendance: 15,000; Referee: Jorge González (USA); Record: 6–2–4 (13:11)

6 September 2011 Friendly	Honduras	0–3	Paraguay	San Pedro Sula, Honduras
19:30 CST			31' Camacho; 87' 90+3' Cardozo	Stadium: Estadio Olímpico Metropolitano; Attendance: 20,000; Referee: Joel Aguilar (SLV); Record: 1–2–2 (3:6)

8 October 2011 Friendly	United States	1–0	Honduras	Miami Gardens, United States
20:00 EST	Dempsey 35'			Stadium: Sun Life Stadium; Attendance: 21,900; Referee: Courtney Campbell (JAM); Record: 4–6–12 (21:34)

11 October 2011 Friendly	Honduras	2–1	Jamaica	La Ceiba, Honduras
19:30 CST	Bengtson 1'; Martínez 54'		45+1' Phillips	Stadium: Estadio Nilmo Edwards; Attendance: 18,000; Referee: Roberto Moreno (PAN); Record: 11–4–6 (40:22)

14 November 2011 Friendly	Honduras	2–0	Serbia	San Pedro Sula, Honduras
19:30 CST	Bengtson 4' 29'			Stadium: Estadio Olímpico Metropolitano; Attendance: 20,000; Referee: Elmar Rodas (GUA); Record: 1–0–1 (2:1)

== 2012 ==
29 February 2012 Friendly	Ecuador	2–0	Honduras	Guayaquil, Ecuador
19:00 ECT	Ayoví 15' 70'			Stadium: Estadio George Capwell; Attendance: 6,000; Referee: Imer Machado (COL); Record: 2–6–3 (10:11)

11 April 2012 Friendly	Costa Rica	1–1	Honduras	San José, Costa Rica
19:00 CST	Vargas 49'		24' Suazo	Stadium: Estadio Nacional; Attendance: 6,000; Referee: Mark Geiger (USA); Record: 17–19–21 (75:101)

26 May 2012 Friendly	Honduras	0–1	New Zealand	Dallas, United States
20:00 CST			45' Smeltz	Stadium: Cotton Bowl; Referee: Edvin Jurisevic (USA); Record: 0–1–1 (1:2)

2 June 2012 Friendly	El Salvador	0–3	Honduras	Washington, D.C., United States
16:30 EST			10' Bernárdez; 50' Costly; 84' Lalín	Stadium: Robert F. Kennedy Memorial Stadium; Attendance: 41,780; Referee: Ricardo Salazar (USA); Record: 32–16–16 (106:68)

8 June 2012 FWCQ	Honduras	0–2	Panama	San Pedro Sula, Honduras
19:30 CST			65' 80' Pérez	Stadium: Estadio Olímpico Metropolitano; Attendance: 28,215; Referee: Roberto García (MEX); Record: 24–6–9 (64:24)

12 June 2012 FWCQ	Canada	0–0	Honduras	Toronto, Canada
19:45 EST				Stadium: BMO Field; Attendance: 16,132; Referee: Enrico Wijngaarde (SUR); Record: 9–5–6 (30:25)

15 August 2012 Friendly	Boca Juniors (Argentina)	0–2	Honduras	Miami Gardens, United States
19:45 EST			23' Bengtson; 90' Chávez	Stadium: Sun Life Stadium; Attendance: 4,120; Referee: Armando Villarreal (USA); Record: 1–0–0 (2:0)

7 September 2012 FWCQ	Cuba	0–3	Honduras	Havana, Cuba
15:00 EST			32' Bengtson; 62' Bernárdez; 90+3' Chávez	Stadium: Estadio Pedro Marrero; Attendance: 8,000; Referee: Wálter Quesada (CRC); Record: 6–2–5 (24:23)

11 September 2012 FWCQ	Honduras	1–0	Cuba	San Pedro Sula, Honduras
19:30 CST	Bengtson 33'			Stadium: Estadio Olímpico Metropolitano; Attendance: 12,000; Referee: Walter López (GUA); Record: 7–2–5 (25:23)

12 October 2012 FWCQ	Panama	0–0	Honduras	Panama City, Panama
21:05 EST				Stadium: Estadio Rommel Fernández; Attendance: 27,000; Referee: Joel Aguilar (SLV); Record: 24–7–9 (64:24)

16 October 2012 FWCQ	Honduras	8–1	Canada	San Pedro Sula, Honduras
14:00 CST	Bengtson 7' 17' 83'; Costly 29' 49' 88'; Martínez 33' 61'		77' Hume	Stadium: Estadio Olímpico Metropolitano; Attendance: 38,000; Referee: Mauricio Morales (MEX); Record: 10–5–6 (38:26)

14 November 2012 Friendly	Honduras	0–0	Peru	Houston, United States
19:50 CST				Stadium: BBVA Compass Stadium; Referee: David Gantar (CAN); Record: 2–4–2 (10:10)

== 2013 ==
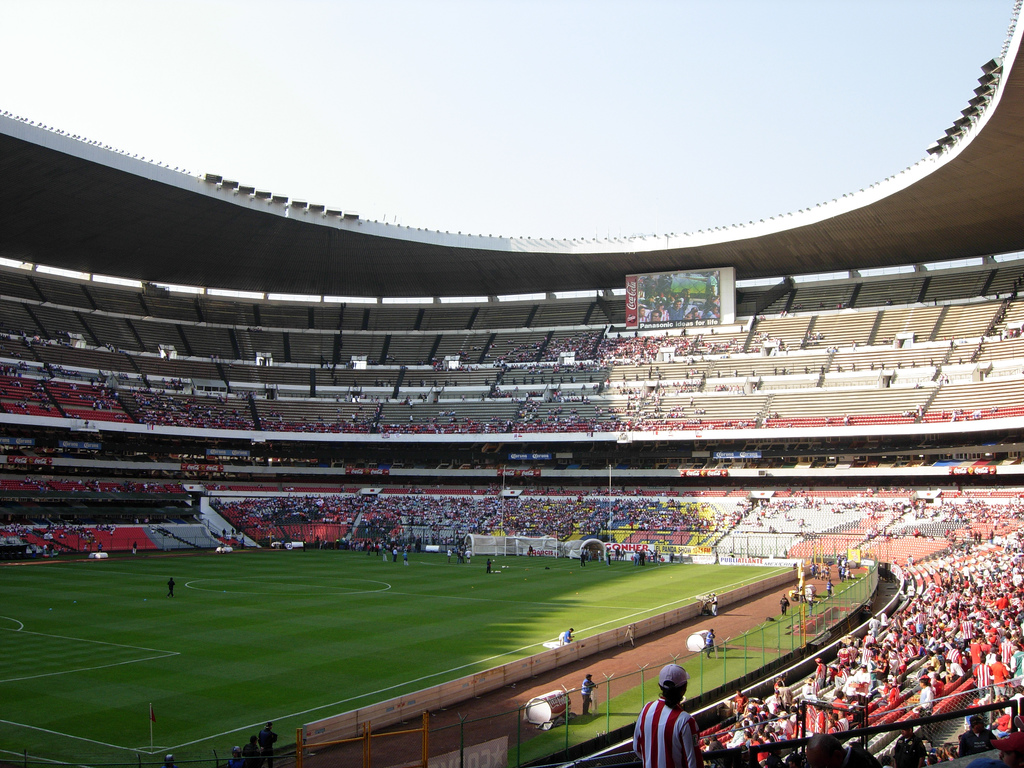
Honduras won its first game at Estadio Azteca in 2013

In 2013, Honduras qualified to their second straight FIFA World Cup and third total. They also participated in the Copa Centroamericana and the CONCACAF Gold Cup where they finished runners-up and semifinalist respectively.

The Hexagonal, in 2013, marked many important events for Honduras. In their opening game they achieved their first home victory against the United States. Another major feat was a victory over Mexico in Estadio Azteca, effectively qualifying Honduras to the World Cup. Another important event includes a record setting attendance for an association football game in the state of Florida, against Brazil. This year also marks the first time Honduras faced Israel.

18 January 2013 CC	El Salvador	1–1	Honduras	San José, Costa Rica
18:00 CST	Burgos 77'		75' Bengtson	Stadium: Estadio Nacional; Attendance: 2,500; Referee: Walter López (GUA); Record: 32–17–16 (107:69)

22 January 2013 CC	Honduras	1–1	Panama	San José, Costa Rica
18:00 CST	Montes 31'		13' Sánchez	Stadium: Estadio Nacional; Attendance: 3,450; Referee: Roberto García (MEX); Record: 24–8–9 (65:25)

25 January 2013 CC	Belize	0–1	Honduras	San José, Costa Rica
17:30 CST			67' Beckeles	Stadium: Estadio Nacional; Attendance: 1,644; Referee: Walter López (GUA); Record: 5–0–0 (14:2)

27 January 2013 CC	Costa Rica	1–0	Honduras	San José, Costa Rica
17:00 CST	González 38'			Stadium: Estadio Nacional; Attendance: 14,146; Referee: Joel Aguilar (SLV); Record: 17–19–22 (75:102)

6 February 2013 FWCQ	Honduras	2–1	United States	San Pedro Sula, Honduras
15:00 CST	García 40'; Bengtson 79'		36' Dempsey	Stadium: Estadio Olímpico Metropolitano; Attendance: 32,000; Referee: Wálter Quesada (CRC); Record: 5–6–12 (23:35)

22 March 2013 FWCQ	Honduras	2–2	Mexico	San Pedro Sula, Honduras
15:05 CST	Costly 77'; Bengtson 80'		28' 54' Hernández	Stadium: Estadio Olímpico Metropolitano; Attendance: 38,500; Referee: Courtney Campbell (JAM); Record: 6–6–19 (29:60)

26 March 2013 FWCQ	Panama	2–0	Honduras	Panama City, Panama
21:00 EST	Tejada 1'; Pérez 74'			Stadium: Estadio Rommel Fernández; Attendance: 18,253; Referee: Jair Marrufo (USA); Record: 24–8–10 (65:27)

2 June 2013 Friendly	Honduras	0–2	Israel	New York City, United States
17:30 EST			51' Ezra; 76' Abuhatzira	Stadium: Citi Field; Attendance: 26,170; Referee: Edvin Jurisevic (USA); Record: 0–0–1 (0:2)

7 June 2013 FWCQ	Costa Rica	1–0	Honduras	San José, Costa Rica
20:10 CST	Miller 25'			Stadium: Estadio Nacional; Attendance: 35,000; Referee: Walter López (GUA); Record: 17–19–23 (75:103)

11 June 2013 FWCQ	Honduras	2–0	Jamaica	Tegucigalpa, Honduras
19:00 CST	García 10'; Rojas 88'			Stadium: Estadio Tiburcio Carías Andino; Attendance: 29,000; Referee: Marco Rodríguez (MEX); Record: 12–4–6 (42:22)

15 June 2013 Friendly	Nicaragua	2–2	Honduras	Managua, Nicaragua
20:00 CST	Rodríguez 56'; Barrera 68'		15' Lacayo; 87' Espinal	Stadium: Dennis Martínez National Stadium; Referee: Record: 16–2–1 (70:13)

18 June 2013 FWCQ	United States	1–0	Honduras	Sandy, United States
19:06 MST	Altidore 74'			Stadium: Rio Tinto Stadium; Attendance: 20,250; Referee: Enrico Wijngaarde (SUR); Record: 5–6–13 (23:36)

8 July 2013 CGC	Haiti	0–2	Honduras	Harrison, United States
21:30 EST			4' Martínez; 78' Chávez	Stadium: Red Bull Arena; Attendance: 20,000; Referee: Hugo Cruz (CRC); Record: 12–0–4 (34:12)

12 July 2013 CGC	El Salvador	0–1	Honduras	Miami Gardens, United States
21:30 EST			90+2' Claros	Stadium: Sun Life Stadium; Attendance: 28,713; Referee: Jair Marrufo (USA); Record: 33–17–16 (108:69)

15 July 2013 CGC	Honduras	0–2	Trinidad and Tobago	Houston, United States
21:30 CST			48' (pen.) Jones; 67' Molino	Stadium: BBVA Compass Stadium; Attendance: 21,783; Referee: Marco Rodríguez (MEX); Record: 7–6–3 (24:17)

21 July 2013 CGC	Costa Rica	0–1	Honduras	Baltimore, United States
19:00 EST			49' Najar	Stadium: M&T Bank Stadium; Attendance: 70,540; Referee: Courtney Campbell (JAM); Record: 18–19–23 (76:103)

24 July 2013 CGC	United States	3–1	Honduras	Arlington, United States
19:00 CST	Johnson 11'; Donovan 27' 53'		52' Medina	Stadium: Cowboys Stadium; Attendance: 81,410; Referee: Wálter Quesada (CRC); Record: 5–6–14 (24:39)

6 September 2013 FWCQ	Mexico	1–2	Honduras	Mexico City, Mexico
20:30 CST	Peralta 6'		63' Bengtson; 66' Costly	Stadium: Estadio Azteca; Attendance: 73,981; Referee: Roberto Moreno (PAN); Record: 7–6–19 (31:61)

10 September 2013 FWCQ	Honduras	2–2	Panama	Tegucigalpa, Honduras
19:00 CST	Costly 28'; Palacios 61'		50' Torres; 90+1' Chen	Stadium: Estadio Tiburcio Carías Andino; Attendance: 26,582; Referee: Mark Geiger (USA); Record: 24–9–10 (67:29)

11 October 2013 FWCQ	Honduras	1–0	Costa Rica	San Pedro Sula, Honduras
15:00 CST	Bengtson 65'			Stadium: Estadio Olímpico Metropolitano; Attendance: 38,500; Referee: Jair Marrufo (USA); Record: 19–19–23 (77:103)

15 October 2013 FWCQ	Jamaica	2–2	Honduras	Kingston, Jamaica
20:30 EST	Claros 3' (o.g.); Austin 59' (pen.)		2' Costly; 32' Figueroa	Stadium: Independence Park; Attendance: 6,000; Referee: Mark Geiger (USA); Record: 12–5–6 (44:24)

16 November 2013 Friendly	Brazil	5–0	Honduras	Miami Gardens, United States
18:30 EST	Bernard 22'; Dante 55'; Maicon 66'; Willian 70'; Hulk 74'			Stadium: Sun Life Stadium; Attendance: 71,753; Referee: David Gantar (CAN); Record: 1–1–4 (6:21)

19 November 2013 Friendly	Ecuador	2–2	Honduras	Houston, United States
20:30 CST	Ayoví 15'; Valencia 89'		63' 67' Costly	Stadium: BBVA Compass Stadium; Attendance: 10,000; Referee: Ricardo Salazar (USA); Record: 2–7–3 (12:13)

== 2014 ==
In 2014 Honduras participated in their second straight FIFA World Cup and third total. Honduras played France, Ecuador, and Switzerland in the Group E resulting with one goal by Carlo Costly, the third goal in Honduras' World Cup history.

After the World Cup, Honduras competed in the 2014 Copa Centroamericana. This edition of the Copa Centroamericana was the first ever to be held outside the UNCAF nations.

5 March 2014 Friendly	Honduras	2–1	Venezuela	San Pedro Sula, Honduras
19:00 CST	Bengtson 5'; Palacios 47'		19' Otero	Stadium: Estadio Olímpico Metropolitano; Attendance: 25,000; Referee: Henry Bejarano (CRC); Record: 3–2–4 (9:9)

29 May 2014 Friendly	Honduras	0–2	Turkey	Washington, D.C., United States
20:00 EST			70' Erdinç; 83' Erkin	Stadium: Robert F. Kennedy Memorial Stadium; Attendance: 20,723; Referee: Roberto García (MEX); Record: 0–0–3 (0:5)

1 June 2014 Friendly	Honduras	2–4	Israel	Houston, United States
20:00 CST	Espinoza 47'; Costly 83'		34' Zahavi; 53' (o.g.) Figueroa; 60' Damari; 74' Vermouth	Stadium: BBVA Compass Stadium; Attendance: 19,235; Referee: Kevin Morrison (JAM); Record: 0–0–2 (2:6)

7 June 2014 Friendly	England	0–0	Honduras	Miami Gardens, United States
16:45 EST				Stadium: Sun Life Stadium; Attendance: 45,379; Referee: Ricardo Salazar (USA); Record: 0–1–0 (0:0)

15 June 2014 FWC	France	3–0	Honduras	Porto Alegre, Brazil
16:00 BRT	Benzema 45' (pen.) 72'; Valladares 48' (o.g.)			Stadium: Estádio Beira-Rio; Attendance: 43,012; Referee: Sandro Ricci (BRA); Record: 0–0–1 (0:3)

20 June 2014 FWC	Ecuador	2–1	Honduras	Curitiba, Brazil
19:00 BRT	Valencia 34' 65'		31' Costly	Stadium: Arena da Baixada; Attendance: 39,224; Referee: Ben Williams (AUS); Record: 2–7–4 (13:15)

25 June 2014 FWC	Honduras	0–3	Switzerland	Manaus, Brazil
16:00 BRT			6' 31' 71' Shaqiri	Stadium: Arena da Amazônia; Attendance: 40,322; Referee: Néstor Pitana (ARG); Record: 0–1–1 (0:3)

3 September 2014 CC	Belize	0–2	Honduras	Washington, D.C., United States
19:30 EST			35' (o.g.) Jerome James; 37' (o.g.) Smith	Stadium: Robert F. Kennedy Memorial Stadium; Attendance: 20,516; Referee: Sandy Vásquez (DOM); Record: 6–0–0 (16:2)

7 September 2014 CC	El Salvador	1–0	Honduras	Dallas, United States
20:00 CST	Menjivar 67'			Stadium: Cotton Bowl; Attendance: 20,156; Referee: Jeffrey Solís (CRC); Record: 33–17–17 (108:70)

10 September 2014 CC	Guatemala	2–0	Honduras	Houston, United States
21:00 CST	Pappa 37' 80'			Stadium: BBVA Compass Stadium; Attendance: 19,287; Referee: Roberto García (MEX); Record: 18–18–13 (57:55)

13 September 2014 CC	Honduras	1–0	Nicaragua	Los Angeles, United States
15:00 PST	Lozano 45+1'			Stadium: Los Angeles Memorial Coliseum; Attendance: 41,969; Referee: Joel Aguilar (SLV); Record: 17–2–1 (71:13)

9 October 2014 Friendly	Mexico	2–0	Honduras	Chiapas, Mexico
19:00 CST	Hernández 20'; Alanís 37'			Stadium: Estadio Víctor Manuel Reyna; Attendance: 28,000; Referee: Wálter Quesada (CRC); Record: 7–6–20 (31:63)

14 October 2014 Friendly	United States	1–1	Honduras	Boca Raton, United States
20:00 EST	Altidore 10'		87' Figueroa	Stadium: FAU Stadium; Attendance: 14,805; Referee: Yadel Martínez (CUB); Record: 5–7–14 (25:40)

14 November 2014 Friendly	Japan	6–0	Honduras	Toyota, Japan
19:35 JST	Yoshida 9'; Honda 40'; Endō 44'; Inui 47' 74'; Toyoda 69'			Stadium: Toyota Stadium; Attendance: 42,126; Referee: Bartosz Frankowski (POL); Record: 0–1–2 (7:14)

18 November 2014 Friendly	China	0–0	Honduras	Guangzhou, China
19:35 CST				Stadium: Tianhe Stadium; Attendance: 30,000; Referee: Jumpei Iida (JPN); Record: 1–1–1 (1:3)

== 2015 ==
This year marked the end of Hernán Medford as head coach and the beginning of the Jorge Pinto era. In 2015 Honduras started playing in the 2015 CONCACAF Gold Cup play-off against French Guiana. In December 2015, Honduras reached its worst position ever in the FIFA World Rankings falling to the 101st place.

4 February 2015 Friendly	Honduras	2–3	Venezuela	San Pedro Sula, Honduras
18:30 CST	Lozano 80'; Montes 90'		21' Blanco; 50' Figuera; 76' Farías	Stadium: Estadio Olímpico Metropolitano; Attendance: 40,000; Referee: Joel Aguilar (SLV); Record: 3–2–5 (11:12)

11 February 2015 Friendly	Venezuela	2–1	Honduras	Barinas, Venezuela
19:00 VET	Lucena 17'; Murillo 57'		14' Lozano	Stadium: Estadio Agustín Tovar; Attendance: 25,000; Referee: Diego Haro (PER); Record: 3–2–6 (12:14)

25 March 2015 CGCQ	French Guiana	3–1	Honduras	Remire-Montjoly, French Guiana
19:00 GFT	Torvic 24'; Privat 26' 62'		17' Bengtson	Stadium: Stade Municipal Dr. Edmard Lama; Referee: César Ramos (MEX); Record: 0–0–1 (1:3)

29 March 2015 CGCQ	Honduras	3–0	French Guiana	San Pedro Sula, Honduras
18:30 CST	Najar 30' 32'; Lozano 44'			Stadium: Estadio Olímpico Metropolitano; Referee: Mark Geiger (USA); Elo Ratings before match: Record: 1–0–1 (4:3)

31 May 2015 Friendly	El Salvador	0–2	Honduras	Washington, D.C., United States
15:00 EST			7' Martínez; 26' Lozano	Stadium: Robert F. Kennedy Memorial Stadium; Attendance: 4,500; Referee: Christopher Prenzo (USA); Record: 34–17–17 (110:70)

6 June 2015 Friendly	Paraguay	2–2	Honduras	Asunción, Paraguay
18:15 PYT	Santa Cruz 20' 56'		8' (o.g.) Santa Cruz; 23' Castillo	Stadium: Estadio Manuel Ferreira; Attendance: 9,500; Referee: Fernando Falce (URU); Record: 1–3–2 (5:8)

10 June 2015 Friendly	Brazil	1–0	Honduras	Porto Alegre, Brazil
19:00 BRT	Firmino 33'			Stadium: Estádio Beira-Rio; Attendance: 22,305; Referee: Gery Vargas (BOL); Record: 1–1–5 (6:22)

1 July 2015 Friendly	Mexico	0–0	Honduras	Houston, United States
20:30 CST				Stadium: NRG Stadium; Attendance: 70,128; Referee: Armando Villarreal (USA); Record: 7–7–20 (31:63)

7 July 2015 CGC	United States	2–1	Honduras	Frisco, United States
20:30 EST	Dempsey 25' 64'		69' Discua	Stadium: Toyota Stadium; Attendance: 22,357; Referee: César Ramos (MEX); Record: 5–7–15 (26:42)

10 July 2015 CGC	Honduras	1–1	Panama	Foxborough, United States
18:00 EST	Najar (penalty missed) 81'		21' Tejeda	Stadium: Gillette Stadium; Attendance: 46,720; Referee: Marlon Mejía (SLV); Record: 24–10–10 (68:30)

13 July 2015 CGC	Haiti	1–0	Honduras	Kansas City, United States
18:00 CST	Nazon 14'			Stadium: Sporting Park; Attendance: 18,467; Referee: Roberto García (MEX); Record: 12–0–5 (34:13)

4 September 2015 Friendly	Venezuela	0–3	Honduras	Puerto Ordaz, Venezuela
17:30 VET	Rondón (penalty missed)		55' Andino; 73' Castillo; 85' (pen.) Izaguirre	Stadium: Polideportivo Cachamay; Attendance: 2,000; Referee: Jorge Buitrago (COL); Record: 4–2–6 (15:14)

8 September 2015 Friendly	Ecuador	2–0	Honduras	Quito, Ecuador
17:00 ECT	Velásquez 13' (o.g.); Bolaños 35'			Stadium: Estadio Olímpico Atahualpa; Attendance: 10,000; Referee: Ímer Machado (COL); Record: 2–7–5 (13:17)

8 October 2015 Friendly	Honduras	1–1	Guatemala	Tegucigalpa, Honduras
19:00 CST	Bengtson 3'		49' Tinoco	Stadium: Estadio Tiburcio Carías Andino; Attendance: 5,000; Referee: Héctor Rodríguez (HON); Record: 18–19–13 (58:56)

13 October 2015 Friendly	Honduras	1–1	South Africa	San Pedro Sula, Honduras
18:00 CST	Andino 13'		8' Mathoho	Stadium: Estadio Olímpico Metropolitano; Attendance: 7,000; Referee: John Pitti (PAN); Record: 0–1–0 (1:1)

13 November 2015 FWCQ	Canada	1–0	Honduras	Vancouver, Canada
19:15 PST	Larin 38'			Stadium: BC Place; Referee: Kevin Morrison (JAM); Record: 10–5–7 (38:27)

17 November 2015 FWCQ	Honduras	0–2	Mexico	San Pedro Sula, Honduras
15:00 CST			67' Corona; 72' Damm	Stadium: Estadio Olímpico Metropolitano; Referee: John Pitti (PAN); Record: 7–7–21 (31:65)

16 December 2015 Friendly	Honduras	2–0	Cuba	Juticalpa, Honduras
15:00 CST	Elis 6' 54'			Stadium: Estadio Juan Ramón Brevé Vargas; Attendance: 6,500; Referee: Héctor Rodríguez (HON); Record: 8–2–5 (27:23)

== 2016 ==
In 2016 Honduras started playing in a friendly match against Nicaragua. On 27 May, Honduras played Argentina away for the first time in a friendly game where they faced superstar Lionel Messi who had to leave the match early due to a back injury. After a slow start in the group stage of the FIFA World Cup qualifiers, Honduras went to claim a berth to the fifth and last stage in the very last game against Mexico with a 0–0 drawn at Estadio Azteca, making this the second time in a row in which Honduras is able to harvest some points at this venue.

27 January 2016 Friendly	Nicaragua	1–3	Honduras	Managua, Nicaragua
19:00 CST	Leguías 14'		57' Méndez; 83' (pen.) Alvarado; 89' (o.g.) Casco	Stadium: Nicaragua National Football Stadium; Attendance: 5,000; Referee: Óscar Dávila (NCA); Record: 18–2–1 (74:14)

10 February 2016 Friendly	Guatemala	3–1	Honduras	Guatemala City, Guatemala
20:00 CST	Tinoco 20'; Márquez 42'; Martínez 57'		4' Quioto	Stadium: Estadio Mateo Flores; Attendance: 15,000; Referee: Ismael Cornejo (SLV); Record: 18–19–14 (59:59)

25 March 2016 FWCQ	El Salvador	2–2	Honduras	San Salvador, El Salvador
19:06 CST	Punyed 45'; Bonilla 88'		19' Elis; 59' Lozano	Stadium: Estadio Cuscatlán; Attendance: 9,915; Referee: Javier Santos (PUR); Record: 34–18–17 (112:72)

29 March 2016 FWCQ	Honduras	2–0	El Salvador	San Pedro Sula, Honduras
19:06 CST	García 54'; Quioto 90+4'			Stadium: Estadio Olímpico Metropolitano; Attendance: 38,000; Referee: Ricardo Montero (CRC); Record: 35–18–17 (114:72)

27 May 2016 Friendly	Argentina	1–0	Honduras	San Juan, Argentina
20:00 ART	Higuaín 31'			Stadium: Estadio San Juan del Bicentenario; Attendance: 18,000; Referee: Jorge Osorio (CHI); Record: 0–0–2 (1:4)

24 August 2016 Friendly	Honduras	1–0	Nicaragua	San Pedro Sula, Honduras
15:00 CST	Elis			Stadium: Estadio Olímpico Metropolitano; Attendance: Closed gates Referee: Record: 19–2–1 (75:14)

2 September 2016 FWCQ	Honduras	2–1	Canada	San Pedro Sula, Honduras
15:06 CST	Martínez 45+2'; Quioto 50'		35' James	Stadium: Estadio Olímpico Metropolitano; Attendance: 39,000; Referee: Yadel Martínez (CUB); Record: 11–5–7 (40:28)

6 September 2016 FWCQ	Mexico	0–0	Honduras	Mexico City, Mexico
21:00 CST				Stadium: Estadio Azteca; Attendance: 41,008; Referee: Mark Geiger (USA); Record: 7–8–21 (31:65)

8 October 2016 Friendly	Belize	1–2	Honduras	Belmopan, Belize
16:00 CST	Kuylen 32'		28' Acosta; (penalty missed) Leverón; 89' (pen.) Salas	Stadium: FFB Stadium; Referee: Ismael Cornejo (SLV); Record: 7–0–0 (18:3)

2 November 2016 Friendly	Honduras	5–0	Belize	San Pedro Sula, Honduras
18:00 CST	Reyes 5' 83'; Hernández 37' 47'; Canales 88'			Stadium: Estadio Olímpico Metropolitano; Attendance: Closed gates Referee: Armando Castro (HON); Record: 8–0–0 (23:3)

11 November 2016 FWCQ	Honduras	0–1	Panama	San Pedro Sula, Honduras
14:35 CST			22' Escobar	Stadium: Estadio Olímpico Metropolitano; Attendance: 37,253; Referee: Yadel Martínez (CUB); Record: 24–10–11 (68:31)

15 November 2016 FWCQ	Honduras	3–1	Trinidad and Tobago	San Pedro Sula, Honduras
16:05 CST	Quioto 16'; Izaguirre 19'; Hernández 80'		51' Mitchell	Stadium: Estadio Olímpico Metropolitano; Attendance: 34,576; Referee: Jair Marrufo (USA); Record: 8–6–3 (27:18)

== 2017 ==
Honduras started 2017 playing at Panama City against Nicaragua for the 2017 Copa Centroamericana, a cup which they eventually won, representing their 4th regional title. On 24 March, Honduras suffered its biggest defeat ever in a FIFA World Cup qualification game after losing 0–6 against United States. During the 2017 CONCACAF Gold Cup, Honduras drawn 0–0 in a Group A match against French Guiana. A game in which the South Americans fielded an ineligible player. Florent Malouda had made 80 appearances for France between 2004 and 2012; therefore violating FIFAs regulations. Two days later, CONCACAF released a statement forfeiting the match by a 3–0 score to Honduras. In the last match day of the 2018 World Cup qualifiers, Honduras defeated Mexico in San Pedro Sula and finished in 4th position. For the first time, Honduras played in an Inter-confederation play-off against Australia, however, they failed to qualify to their third straight FIFA World Cup.

13 January 2017 CC	Honduras	2–1	Nicaragua	Panama City, Panama
16:00 EST	Hernández 23'; Andino 69'		19' (o.g.) Figueroa	Stadium: Estadio Rommel Fernández; Referee: Ricardo Montero (CRC); Record: 20–2–1 (77:15)

15 January 2017 CC	El Salvador	1–2	Honduras	Panama City, Panama
15:30 EST	Zelaya 10'		62' 90' Castillo	Stadium: Estadio Rommel Fernández; Referee: Fernando Guerrero (MEX); Record: 36–18–17 (116:73)

17 January 2017 CC	Panama	0–1	Honduras	Panama City, Panama
21:00 EST			37' (pen.) Hernández	Stadium: Estadio Rommel Fernández; Referee: Jair Marrufo (USA); Record: 25–10–11 (69:31)

20 January 2017 CC	Costa Rica	1–1	Honduras	Panama City, Panama
18:30 EST	Calvo 59'		17' Andino	Stadium: Estadio Rommel Fernández; Referee: Fernando Guerrero (MEX); Record: 19–20–23 (78:104)

22 January 2017 CC	Belize	0–1	Honduras	Panama City, Panama
11:00 EST			56' Hernández	Stadium: Estadio Rommel Fernández; Referee: Kimbell Ward (SKN); Record: 9–0–0 (24:3)

16 February 2017 Friendly	Honduras	0–1	Jamaica	Houston, United States
19:30 CST			72' Binns	Stadium: BBVA Compass Stadium; Attendance: 5,000; Referee: Jair Marrufo (USA); Record: 12–5–7 (44:25)

22 February 2017 Friendly	Ecuador	3–1	Honduras	Quito, Ecuador
19:15 ECT	Caicedo 53'; Arboleda 60'; Cevallos 81'		24' Andino	Stadium: Estadio Olímpico Atahualpa; Referee: Diego Haro (PER); Record: 2–7–6 (14:20)

16 March 2017 Friendly	Honduras	2–0	Nicaragua	San Pedro Sula, Honduras
16:00 CST	Discua 11'; Andino 71'			Stadium: Estadio Olímpico Metropolitano; Referee: Record: 21–2–1 (79:15)

24 March 2017 FWCQ	United States	6–0	Honduras	San Jose, United States
19:55 PST	Lletget 5'; Bradley 27'; Dempsey 32' 49' 54'; Pulisic 46'			Stadium: Avaya Stadium; Attendance: 17,729; Referee: Walter López (GUA); Record: 5–7–16 (26:48)

28 March 2017 FWCQ	Honduras	1–1	Costa Rica	San Pedro Sula, Honduras
15:00 CST	Lozano 35'		68' Waston	Stadium: Estadio Francisco Morazán; Attendance: 15,800; Referee: Joel Aguilar (SLV); Record: 19–21–23 (79:105)

27 May 2017 Friendly	El Salvador	2–2	Honduras	Washington, D.C., United States
19:00 EST	Zelaya 65' 69'		5' Puerto; 45+2' Martínez	Stadium: Robert F. Kennedy Memorial Stadium; Referee: Mario Escobar (GUA); Record: 36–19–17 (118:75)

8 June 2017 FWCQ	Mexico	3–0	Honduras	Mexico City, Mexico
20:00 CST	Alanís 34'; Lozano 63'; Jiménez 66'			Stadium: Estadio Azteca; Attendance: 38,565; Referee: Drew Fischer (CAN); Record: 7–8–22 (31:68)

13 June 2017 FWCQ	Panama	2–2	Honduras	Panama City, Panama
21:35 EST	Pérez 41'; Torres 90'		5' Quioto; 66' Elis	Stadium: Estadio Rommel Fernández; Record: 25–11–11 (71:33); Attendance: 25,900; Referee: Roberto García (MEX)

7 July 2017 CGC	Costa Rica	1–0	Honduras	Harrison, United States
21:36 EST	Ureña 39'			Stadium: Red Bull Arena; Attendance: 25,817; Referee: Walter López (GUA); Record: 19–21–24 (79:106)

11 July 2017 CGC	French Guiana	0–3 (forfeit)	Honduras	Houston, United States
21:00 CST				Stadium: BBVA Compass Stadium; Attendance: 12,019; Referee: Yadel Martínez (CUB); Record: 2–0–1 (7:3)

14 July 2017 CGC	Canada	0–0	Honduras	Frisco, United States
21:06 CST				Stadium: Toyota Stadium; Attendance: 10,048; Referee: Joel Aguilar (SLV); Record: 11–6–7 (40:28)

20 July 2017 CGC	Honduras	0–1	Mexico	Glendale, United States
19:30 MST			4' Pizarro	Stadium: University of Phoenix Stadium; Attendance: 37,404; Referee: Walter López (GUA); Record: 7–8–23 (31:69)

1 September 2017 FWCQ	Trinidad and Tobago	1–2	Honduras	Couva, Trinidad and Tobago
20:00 AST	Jones 67' (pen.)		7' López; 17' Elis	Stadium: Ato Boldon Stadium; Attendance: 8,000; Referee: Fernando Guerrero (MEX); Record: 9–6–3 (29:19)

5 September 2017 FWCQ	Honduras	1–1	United States	San Pedro Sula, Honduras
15:36 CST	Quioto 27'		85' Wood	Stadium: Estadio Olímpico Metropolitano; Attendance: 37,325; Referee: Joel Aguilar (SLV); Record: 5–8–16 (27:49)

7 October 2017 FWCQ	Costa Rica	1–1	Honduras	San José, Costa Rica
16:00 CST	Waston 90+5'		66' Hernández	Stadium: Estadio Nacional; Attendance: 30,000; Referee: César Ramos (MEX); Record: 19–22–24 (80:107)

10 October 2017 FWCQ	Honduras	3–2	Mexico	San Pedro Sula, Honduras
18:00 CST	Elis 34'; Ochoa 54' (o.g.); Quioto 60'		17' Peralta; 39' Vela	Stadium: Estadio Olímpico Metropolitano; Referee: Joel Aguilar (SLV); Record: 8–8–22 (34:70)

10 November 2017 FWCQPO	Honduras	0–0	Australia	San Pedro Sula, Honduras
16:00 CST				Stadium: Estadio Olímpico Metropolitano; Referee: Daniele Orsato (ITA); Record: 0–1–0 (0:0)

15 November 2017 FWCQPO	Australia	3–1	Honduras	Sydney, Australia
20:00 AEST	Jedinak 53' 72' (pen.) 85' (pen.)		90+4' Elis	Stadium: Stadium Australia; Attendance: 77,060; Referee: Néstor Pitana (ARG); Record: 0–1–1 (1:3)

== 2018 ==
After a painful elimination at the World Cup qualifying, Honduras resumed playing in 2018 with a couple of friendly matches between May and June. In February, they announce their first exhibition match to be played against the South Korea national football team, followed by a friendly against El Salvador in the United States. Honduras closed a quiet year with three friendlies against UAE, Panama and Chile with poor results.

28 May 2018 Friendly	South Korea	2–0	Honduras	Daegu, South Korea
20:00 KST	Son 60'; Moon 72'			Stadium: Daegu Stadium; Attendance: 33,252; Referee: Hiroyuki Kimura (JPN); Record: 0–0–3 (0:9)

2 June 2018 Friendly	El Salvador	1–0	Honduras	Houston, United States
19:30 CST	Pineda 19'			Stadium: BBVA Compass Stadium; Attendance: 17,747; Referee: Ted Unkel (USA); Record: 36–19–18 (118:76)

11 October 2018 Friendly	Honduras	1–1	United Arab Emirates	Barcelona, Spain
18:00 CET	Quioto 18'		32' Abdulrahman	Stadium: Estadi Olímpic Lluís Companys; Attendance: Closed gates Referee: João Santos (POR); Record: 1–2–0 (2:1)

16 November 2018 Friendly	Honduras	1–0	Panama	Tegucigalpa, Honduras
20:00 CST	Lozano 75' (pen.)			Stadium: Estadio Tiburcio Carías Andino; Attendance: 12,309; Referee: Hugo Crug (CRC); Record: 26–11–11 (72:33)

20 November 2018 Friendly	Chile	4–1	Honduras	Temuco, Chile
21:15 CLT	Vidal 8' 35' (pen.); Sánchez (penalty missed) 61'; Castillo 84' (pen.)		40' López	Stadium: Estadio Municipal Germán Becker; Attendance: 17,000; Referee: Michael Espinoza (PER); Record: 3–0–3 (9:13)

== 2019 ==
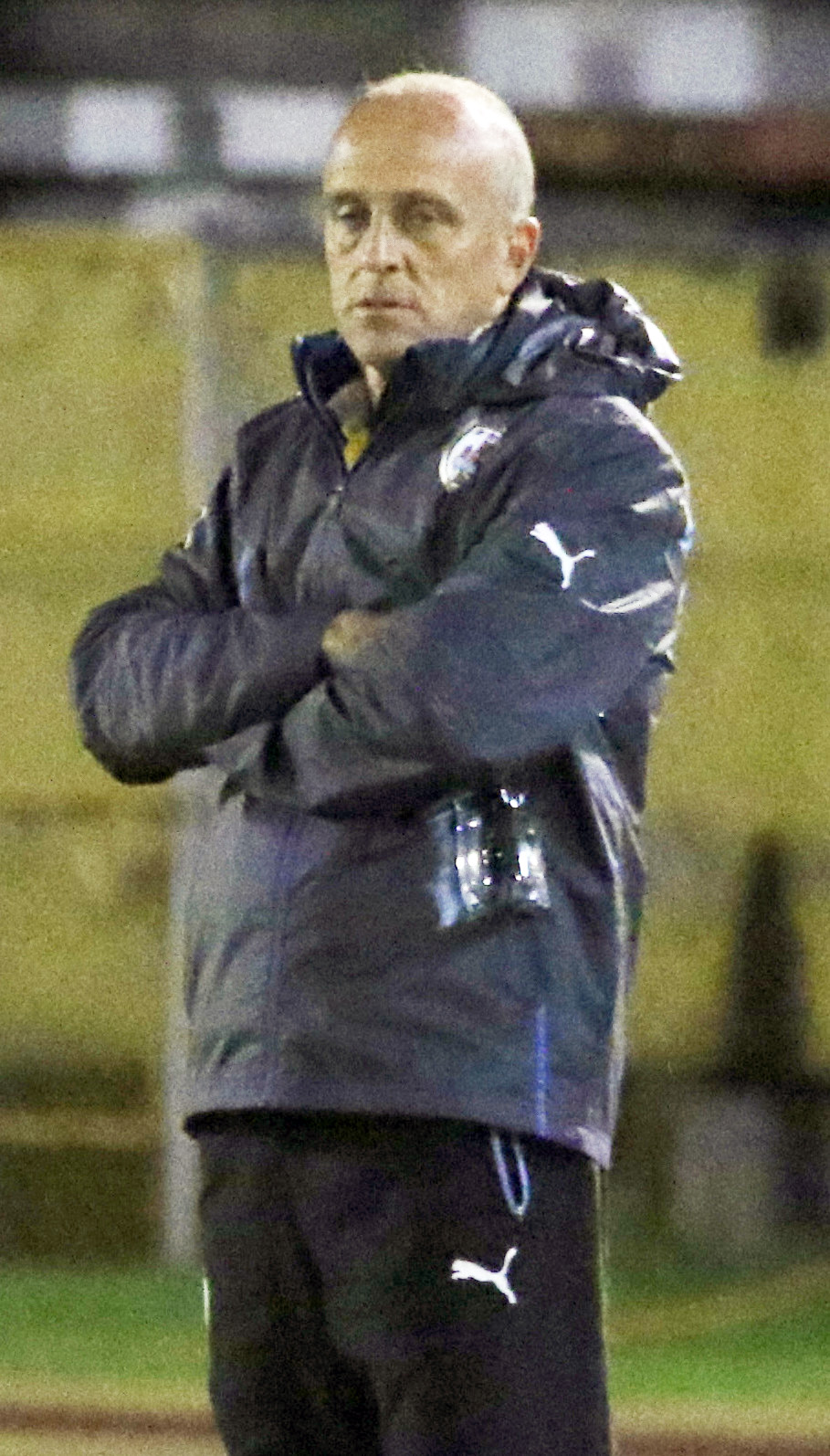
Coach Fabián Coito made his debut in 2019.

On 15 February, former Uruguayan footballer Fabián Coito was named new head coach of Honduras. He made his official debut with a scoreless drawn in a friendly match against Ecuador. This year will also mark the beginning of the new CONCACAF competition branded CONCACAF Nations League. On 27 March, the draw for the group phase took place placing Honduras in Group C along Trinidad and Tobago and Martinique.

For the first time in CONCACAF history, Jamaica will host a CONCACAF Gold Cup match. Honduras was placed in Group C against the Reggae Boyz, Curaçao and El Salvador for the 2019 edition. Midfielders Rigoberto Rivas and Héctor Castellanos made their debuts in June in friendly matches against Paraguay and Brazil respectively.

26 March 2019 Friendly	Ecuador	0–0	Honduras	Harrison, United States
20:00 EST				Stadium: Red Bull Arena; Referee: Jaime Fernández (MEX); Record: 2–8–6 (14:20)

5 June 2019 Friendly	Paraguay	1–1	Honduras	Ciudad del Este, Paraguay
19:00 AST	Cardozo 15' (pen.)		75' Figueroa	Stadium: Estadio Antonio Aranda; Attendance: 20,000; Referee: Eduardo Gamboa (CHI); Record: 1–4–2 (6:9)

9 June 2019 Friendly	Brazil	7–0	Honduras	Porto Alegre, Brazil
16:00 BRT	de Jesus 6' 47'; Silva 13'; Coutinho 37' (pen.); Neres 56'; Firmino 65'; Richarlison 70'			Stadium: Estádio Beira-Rio; Attendance: 16,521; Referee: Andrés Cunha (URU); Record: 1–1–6 (6:29)

17 June 2019 CGC	Jamaica	3–2	Honduras	Kingston, Jamaica
20:30 EST	Orgill 15' 41'; Lowe 56'		54' Lozano; 90+2' Castillo	Stadium: Independence Park; Attendance: 17,874; Referee: Jair Marrufo (USA); Record: 12–5–8 (46:28)

21 June 2019 CGC	Honduras	0–1	Curaçao	Houston, United States
21:30 CST			40' Bacuna	Stadium: BBVA Stadium; Attendance: 22,395; Referee: Juan Calderón (CRC); Record: 5–3–4 (24:21)

25 June 2019 CGC	Honduras	4–0	El Salvador	Los Angeles, United States
19:30 PST	Álvarez 59'; Castillo 65'; Acosta 75'; Izaguirre 90'			Stadium: Banc of California Stadium; Attendance: 22,503; Referee: Fernando Guerrero (MEX); Record: 37–19–18 (122:76)

5 September 2019 Friendly	Honduras	4–0	Puerto Rico	Tegucigalpa, Honduras
19:00 CST	Izaguirre 5'; Benguché 40', 62'; Rubio 59'			Stadium: Estadio Tiburcio Carías Andino; Attendance: 10,359; Referee: Mario Escobar (GUA); Record: 2–1–0 (10:2)

10 September 2019 Friendly	Honduras	2–1	Chile	San Pedro Sula, Honduras
19:30 CST	Elis 73'; Rubio 80'		19' Parot	Stadium: Estadio Olímpico Metropolitano; Referee: Juan Calderón (CRC); Record: 4–0–3 (11:14)

10 October 2019 CNL	Trinidad and Tobago	0–2	Honduras	Port of Spain, Trinidad and Tobago
19:00 AST			52' Moya; 90' Martínez	Stadium: Hasely Crawford Stadium; Attendance: 2,500; Referee: Mario Escobar (GUA); Record: 10–6–3 (31:19)

13 October 2019 CNL	Honduras	1–0	Martinique	San Pedro Sula, Honduras
20:00 CST	Barthéléry 4' (o.g.)			Stadium: Estadio Olímpico Metropolitano; Attendance: 34,265; Referee: Adonai Escobedo (MEX); Record: 2–0–0 (5:2)

14 November 2019 CNL	Martinique	1–1	Honduras	Fort-de-France, Martinique
21:30 AST	Rivière 5'		65' Mejía	Stadium: Stade Pierre-Aliker; Attendance: 1,453; Referee: Ted Unkel (USA); Record: 2–1–0 (6:3)

17 November 2019 CNL	Honduras	4–0	Trinidad and Tobago	San Pedro Sula, Honduras
20:00	Toro 5'; Moya 20'; Elis 45+2' (pen.), 54'			Stadium: Estadio Olímpico Metropolitano; Referee: Joel Aguilar (SLV); Record: 11–6–3 (35:19)

== Record ==
Record does not include matches against clubs or teams not affiliated to FIFA.

As of 17 November 2019

Description	W	D	L	GF	GA
2010s record	51	43	60	176	196
All-time record	249	158	198	906	759
