= 2019–20 CONCACAF Nations League A =

Tournament details
- Dates: Group phase: 5 September – 19 November 2019; Nations League Finals: 3–6 June 2021
- Teams: 12

Final positions
- Champions: United States (1st title)
- Runners-up: Mexico
- Third place: Honduras
- Fourth place: Costa Rica
- Relegated: Bermuda; Cuba; Haiti; Trinidad and Tobago

Tournament statistics
- Matches played: 28
- Goals scored: 83 (2.96 per match)
- Top scorer(s): (United States) Weston McKennie (United States) Jordan Morris (4 goals each)

The 2019–20 CONCACAF Nations League A was the top division of the 2019–20 edition of the CONCACAF Nations League, the inaugural season of the international football competition involving the men's national teams of the 41 member associations of CONCACAF. League A culminated with the final championship in June 2021 to crown the inaugural champions of the CONCACAF Nations League.

== Format ==
League A consisted of twelve teams, with the six participants of the 2018 FIFA World Cup qualifying hexagonal joined by the top six teams from qualifying. The league was split into four groups of three teams. The teams competed in a home-and-away, round-robin format over the course of the group phase, with matches played in the official FIFA match windows in September, October and November 2019. The four group winners qualified to the Nations League final championship, while the four last-placed teams in each group were relegated to League B for the next edition of the tournament.

The Nations League Finals took place in June 2021, and was played in a knockout format in the United States, the centralized location selected by CONCACAF. The four teams played the semi-finals, with the matchups determined by the group stage rankings (1 vs 4 and 2 vs 3), followed by the third place match and the final (Regulations Articles 12.8 and 12.10).

In September 2019, it was announced that the Nations League would also provide qualification for the 2021 CONCACAF Gold Cup. The top two teams from each of the four League A groups qualified for the Gold Cup, while the third-placed teams entered the first round of Gold Cup qualification.

=== Seeding ===
Teams were seeded into the pots of League A according to their position in the November 2018 CONCACAF Ranking Index.

Pot 1
Team	Pts	Rank
Mexico	1,998	1
United States	1,863	2
Costa Rica	1,752	3
Honduras	1,630	4

Pot 2
Team	Pts	Rank
Panama	1,579	5
Canada	1,471	7
Haiti	1,359	10
Trinidad and Tobago	1,342	11

Pot 3
Team	Pts	Rank
Martinique	1,286	12
Cuba	1,152	13
Curaçao	1,079	15
Bermuda	865	23

The draw for the group phase took place at The Chelsea in Las Vegas, Nevada, United States on 27 March 2019, 22:00 EDT (19:00 local time, PDT).

== Groups ==
The fixture list was confirmed by CONCACAF on 21 May 2019.

Times are EDT/EST, (Note: EDT (UTC−4) for matches in September and October 2019, and EST (UTC−5) for matches in November 2019.) as listed by CONCACAF (local times, if different, are in parentheses).

=== Group A ===
Pos	Team	Pld	W	D	L	GF	GA	GD	Pts	Qualification or relegation	(United States)	(Canada)	(Cuba)
1	United States	4	3	0	1	15	3	+12	9	Qualification for Finals and Gold Cup	—	4–1	7–0
2	Canada	4	3	0	1	10	4	+6	9	Qualification for Gold Cup	2–0	—	6–0
3	Cuba (R)	4	0	0	4	0	18	−18	0	Gold Cup prelims and League B	0–4	0–1	—

Source: CONCACAF
Rules for classification: Tiebreakers
(R) Relegated
7 September 2019
20:00

Canada	6–0	Cuba
Hoilett 13', 50', 82' (pen.); David 21'; Osorio 52'; Henry 65'	Report

BMO Field, Toronto
Attendance: 10,224
Referee: Fernando Hernández (Mexico)

10 September 2019
19:15 (18:15 UTC−5)

Cuba	0–1	Canada
	Report	Davies 9'

Truman Bodden Sports Complex, George Town (Cayman Islands) (Note: Cuba played their home matches in Cayman Islands.)
Attendance: 420
Referee: Mario Escobar (Guatemala)

11 October 2019
19:00

United States	7–0	Cuba
McKennie 1', 5', 13'; Morris 9'; Ramos 37' (o.g.); Sargent 40'; Pulisic 62' (pen.)	Report

Audi Field, Washington, D.C.
Attendance: 13,784
Referee: José Torres (Puerto Rico)

15 October 2019
19:30

Canada	2–0	United States
Davies 63'; Cavallini 90+1'	Report

BMO Field, Toronto
Attendance: 17,126
Referee: Daneon Parchment (Jamaica)

15 November 2019
19:00

United States	4–1	Canada
Morris 2'; Zardes 23', 89'; Long 34'	Report	Vitória 72'

Exploria Stadium, Orlando
Attendance: 13,103
Referee: César Ramos (Mexico)

19 November 2019
19:30

Cuba	0–4	United States
	Report	Sargent 1', 66'; Morris 26', 39'

Truman Bodden Sports Complex, George Town (Cayman Islands)
Attendance: 1,966
Referee: John Pitti (Panama)

=== Group B ===
Pos	Team	Pld	W	D	L	GF	GA	GD	Pts	Qualification or relegation	(Mexico)	(Panama)	(Bermuda)
1	Mexico	4	4	0	0	13	3	+10	12	Qualification for Finals and Gold Cup	—	3–1	2–1
2	Panama	4	1	0	3	5	9	−4	3	Qualification for Gold Cup	0–3	—	0–2
3	Bermuda (R)	4	1	0	3	5	11	−6	3	Gold Cup prelims and League B	1–5	1–4	—

Source: CONCACAF
Rules for classification: Tiebreakers
(R) Relegated
5 September 2019
18:00 (19:00 UTC−3)

Bermuda	1–4	Panama
Cummings 44' (o.g.)	Report	Torres 31', 66'; Blackburn 45'; Carrasquilla 90+3'

Bermuda National Stadium, Hamilton
Attendance: 189
Referee: Raúl Castro (Honduras)

8 September 2019
21:00 (20:00 UTC−5)

Panama	0–2	Bermuda
	Report	Wells 22', 61'

Estadio Rommel Fernández, Panama City
Attendance: 12,053
Referee: Nitzar Sandoval (Nicaragua)

11 October 2019
21:00 (22:00 UTC−3)

Bermuda	1–5	Mexico
Wells 56'	Report	Antuna 25'; Macías 45+2', 53'; Lozano 60'; Herrera 71'

Bermuda National Stadium, Hamilton
Attendance: 705
Referee: Henry Bejarano (Costa Rica)

15 October 2019
21:30 (20:30 UTC−5)

Mexico	3–1	Panama
Alvarado 28'; Macías 75'; Pizarro 90+2'	Report	Salcedo 42' (o.g.)

Estadio Azteca, Mexico City
Attendance: 41,075
Referee: Iván Barton (El Salvador)

15 November 2019
21:00

Panama	0–3	Mexico
	Report	Jiménez 8', 85' (pen.); Álvarez 70'

Estadio Rommel Fernández, Panama City
Attendance: 16,407
Referee: Ricardo Montero (Costa Rica)

19 November 2019
21:30 (20:30 UTC−6)

Mexico	2–1	Bermuda
Córdova 27'; Antuna 90+3'	Report	Leverock 10'

Estadio Nemesio Díez, Toluca
Referee: Ismael Cornejo (El Salvador)

=== Group C ===
Pos	Team	Pld	W	D	L	GF	GA	GD	Pts	Qualification or relegation	(Honduras)	(Martinique)	(Trinidad and Tobago)
1	Honduras	4	3	1	0	8	1	+7	10	Qualification for Finals and Gold Cup	—	1–0	4–0
2	Martinique	4	0	3	1	4	5	−1	3	Qualification for Gold Cup	1–1	—	1–1
3	Trinidad and Tobago (R)	4	0	2	2	3	9	−6	2	Gold Cup prelims and League B	0–2	2–2	—

Source: CONCACAF
Rules for classification: Tiebreakers
(R) Relegated
6 September 2019
18:00

Martinique	1–1	Trinidad and Tobago
Mandouki 40'	Report	J. Jones 66' (pen.)

Stade Pierre-Aliker, Fort-de-France
Attendance: 4,678
Referee: José Kellys (Panama)

9 September 2019
21:00

Trinidad and Tobago	2–2	Martinique
Molino 17'; Telfer 46'	Report	Carr 60' (o.g.); Delem 80'

Hasely Crawford Stadium, Port of Spain
Attendance: 2,000
Referee: Diego Montaño (Mexico)

10 October 2019
19:00

Trinidad and Tobago	0–2	Honduras
	Report	Moya 52'; Martínez 90'

Hasely Crawford Stadium, Port of Spain
Attendance: 2,500
Referee: Mario Escobar (Guatemala)

13 October 2019
22:00 (20:00 UTC−6)

Honduras	1–0	Martinique
Barthéléry 4' (o.g.)	Report

Estadio Olímpico Metropolitano, San Pedro Sula
Attendance: 34,265
Referee: Adonai Escobedo (Mexico)

14 November 2019
20:00 (21:00 UTC−4)

Martinique	1–1	Honduras
Rivière 5'	Report	Mejía 65'

Stade Pierre-Aliker, Fort-de-France
Attendance: 1,453
Referee: Ted Unkel (United States)

17 November 2019
20:00 (19:00 UTC−6)

Honduras	4–0	Trinidad and Tobago
Toro 5'; Moya 20'; Elis 45+2' (pen.), 54'	Report

Estadio Olímpico Metropolitano, San Pedro Sula
Referee: Joel Aguilar (El Salvador)

=== Group D ===
Pos	Team	Pld	W	D	L	GF	GA	GD	Pts	Qualification or relegation	(Costa Rica)	(Curaçao)	(Haiti)
1	Costa Rica	4	1	3	0	4	3	+1	6	Qualification for Finals and Gold Cup	—	0–0	1–1
2	Curaçao	4	1	2	1	3	3	0	5	Qualification for Gold Cup, later withdrew (Note: Curaçao, who had originally qualified for the 2021 CONCACAF Gold Cup through the Nations League, eventually had to withdraw just before the start of the tournament due to an outbreak of COVID-19 in the team.)	1–2	—	1–0
3	Haiti (R)	4	0	3	1	3	4	−1	3	Gold Cup prelims and League B	1–1	1–1	—

Source: CONCACAF
Rules for classification: Tiebreakers
(R) Relegated
Notes:
7 September 2019
18:00

Curaçao	1–0	Haiti
Hooi 70'	Report

Ergilio Hato Stadium, Willemstad
Attendance: 8,346
Referee: Keylor Herrera (Costa Rica)

10 September 2019
18:00

Haiti	1–1	Curaçao
Pierrot 15'	Report	Hooi 41'

Stade Sylvio Cator, Port-au-Prince
Attendance: 9,654
Referee: Walter López (Guatemala)

10 October 2019
21:00

Haiti	1–1	Costa Rica
Pierrot 82'	Report	Ortiz 53'

Thomas Robinson Stadium, Nassau (Bahamas) (Note: Haiti played their home match against Costa Rica at Thomas Robinson Stadium, Nassau in Bahamas, instead of Stade Sylvio Cator, Port-au-Prince, due to the political and social situation in Haiti.)
Attendance: 4,012
Referee: Drew Fischer (Canada)

13 October 2019
20:00 (18:00 UTC−6)

Costa Rica	0–0	Curaçao
	Report

Estadio Alejandro Morera Soto, Alajuela
Attendance: 7,256
Referee: Armando Villarreal (United States)

14 November 2019
18:30 (19:30 UTC−4)

Curaçao	1–2	Costa Rica
Janga 20'	Report	Venegas 14' (pen.); Calvo 84'

Ergilio Hato Stadium, Willemstad
Attendance: 11,387
Referee: Marco Ortíz (Mexico)

17 November 2019
18:00 (17:00 UTC−6)

Costa Rica	1–1	Haiti
Calvo 27'	Report	Nazon 38' (pen.)

Estadio Ricardo Saprissa Aymá, San José
Referee: Saíd Martínez (Honduras)

== Nations League Finals ==
=== Seeding ===
The four teams were ranked based on their results in the group stage to determine the semi-final matchups.

Seed	Grp	Team	Pld	W	D	L	GF	GA	GD	Pts
1	B	Mexico	4	4	0	0	13	3	+10	12
2	C	Honduras	4	3	1	0	8	1	+7	10
3	A	United States (H)	4	3	0	1	15	3	+12	9
4	D	Costa Rica	4	1	3	0	4	3	+1	6

Source: CONCACAF
Rules for classification: 1) points; 2) goal difference; 3) goals scored; 4) away goals scored; 5) disciplinary points; 6) drawing of lots (Regulations Article 12.9).
(H) Hosts

=== Bracket ===
Semi-finals
3 June – Denver
Honduras	0
United States	1
3 June – Denver
Mexico (p)	0 (5)
Costa Rica	0 (4)

Final
6 June – Denver
United States (a.e.t.)	3
Mexico	2
Third place play-off
6 June – Denver
Honduras (p)	2 (5)
Costa Rica	2 (4)

=== Semi-finals ===
3 June 2021
17:30 (Note: Though listed with a 17:30 kick-off time, the match began at 17:36.)

Honduras	0–1	United States
	Report	Pefok 89'

Empower Field at Mile High, Denver
Attendance: 34,451
Referee: Oshane Nation (Jamaica)

3 June 2021
20:00 (Note: Though listed with a 20:00 kick-off time, the match began at 20:36.)

Mexico	0–0 (a.e.t.)	Costa Rica
	Report
Penalties
Antuna (penalty missed); Lozano (penalty scored); Pineda (penalty scored); Pulido (penalty scored); Romo (penalty scored); Gallardo (penalty scored)	5–4	(penalty scored) Venegas; (penalty missed) Duarte; (penalty scored) Alfaro; (penalty scored) Lassiter; (penalty scored) Calvo; (penalty missed) Cruz

Empower Field at Mile High, Denver
Attendance: 34,451
Referee: Bryan López (Guatemala)

=== Third place play-off ===
6 June 2021
16:30 (Note: Though listed with a 16:30 kick-off time, the match began at 16:36.)

Honduras	2–2 (a.e.t.)	Costa Rica
E. Rodríguez 48'; Elis 80'	Report	Campbell 8'; Calvo 85'
Penalties
A. López (penalty scored); Elis (penalty scored); Benguché (penalty scored); Toro (penalty missed); Acosta (penalty scored); Alvarado (penalty scored)	5–4	(penalty scored) Venegas; (penalty scored) Calvo; (penalty missed) Lassiter; (penalty scored) Torres; (penalty scored) Mora; (penalty missed) Tejeda

Empower Field at Mile High, Denver
Attendance: 37,648
Referee: Reon Radix (Grenada)

=== Final ===
6 June 2021
19:00 (Note: Though listed with a 19:00 kick-off time, the match actually began at 19:36.)

United States	3–2 (a.e.t.)	Mexico
Reyna 27'; McKennie 82'; Pulisic 114' (pen.)	Report	Corona 2'; Lainez 79'

Empower Field at Mile High, Denver
Attendance: 37,648
Referee: John Pitti (Panama)

== Goalscorers ==
There were 83 goals scored in 28 matches, for an average of 2.96 goals per match.

4 goals

- (United States) Weston McKennie
- (United States) Jordan Morris

3 goals

- (Bermuda) Nahki Wells
- (Canada) Junior Hoilett
- (Costa Rica) Francisco Calvo
- (Honduras) Alberth Elis
- (Mexico) José Juan Macías
- (United States) Josh Sargent

2 goals

- (Canada) Alphonso Davies
- (Curaçao) Elson Hooi
- (Haiti) Frantzdy Pierrot
- (Honduras) Brayan Moya
- (Mexico) Uriel Antuna
- (Mexico) Raúl Jiménez
- (Panama) Gabriel Torres
- (United States) Christian Pulisic
- (United States) Gyasi Zardes

1 goal

- (Bermuda) Dante Leverock
- (Canada) Lucas Cavallini
- (Canada) Jonathan David
- (Canada) Doneil Henry
- (Canada) Jonathan Osorio
- (Canada) Steven Vitória
- (Costa Rica) Joel Campbell
- (Costa Rica) José Ortiz
- (Costa Rica) Johan Venegas
- (Curaçao) Rangelo Janga
- (Haiti) Duckens Nazon
- (Honduras) Douglas Martínez
- (Honduras) Juan Mejía
- (Honduras) Edwin Rodríguez
- (Honduras) Jonathan Toro
- (Mexico) Roberto Alvarado
- (Mexico) Edson Álvarez
- (Mexico) Sebastián Córdova
- (Mexico) Jesús Corona
- (Mexico) Héctor Herrera
- (Mexico) Diego Lainez
- (Mexico) Hirving Lozano
- (Mexico) Rodolfo Pizarro
- (Martinique) Jordy Delem
- (Martinique) Cyril Mandouki
- (Martinique) Emmanuel Rivière
- (Panama) Rolando Blackburn
- (Panama) Adalberto Carrasquilla
- (Trinidad and Tobago) Joevin Jones
- (Trinidad and Tobago) Kevin Molino
- (Trinidad and Tobago) Ryan Telfer
- (United States) Aaron Long
- (United States) Giovanni Reyna
- (United States) Jordan Siebatcheu

1 own goal

- (Cuba) Darío Ramos (against United States)
- (Martinique) Romario Barthéléry (against Honduras)
- (Mexico) Carlos Salcedo (against Panama)
- (Panama) Harold Cummings (against Bermuda)
- (Trinidad and Tobago) Daniel Carr (against Martinique)
