= 2021 CONCACAF Nations League Finals =

Tournament details
- Host country: United States
- Dates: June 3–6
- Teams: 4
- Venue: 1 (in 1 host city)

Final positions
- Champions: United States (1st title)
- Runners-up: Mexico
- Third place: Honduras
- Fourth place: Costa Rica

Tournament statistics
- Matches played: 4
- Goals scored: 10 (2.5 per match)
- Attendance: 144,198 (36,050 per match)
- Top scorer(s): Ten players (1 goal each)
- Best player: (United States) Weston McKennie
- Best goalkeeper: (Honduras) Luis López

The 2021 CONCACAF Nations League Finals was the final tournament of the 2019–20 edition of the CONCACAF Nations League, the inaugural season of the international football competition involving the men's national teams of the member associations of CONCACAF. The event was held from June 3 to 6, 2021 at Empower Field at Mile High in Denver, Colorado, United States, and was contested by the four group winners of League A. The event consisted of two semi-finals, a third place play-off, and a final to determine the inaugural champions of the CONCACAF Nations League.

The United States defeated Mexico 3–2 after extra time in the final to become the first champions of the CONCACAF Nations League.

== Format ==
The CONCACAF Nations League Finals took place in June 2021 and was contested by the four group winners of League A.

The Nations League Finals was played in single-leg knockout matches, consisting of two semi-finals, a third place play-off, and a final. The semi-final pairings were determined by the group stage rankings (1 vs. 4 and 2 vs. 3), and the administrative home teams for the third place play-off and final were announced on March 9, 2020. All matches in the tournament utilized the goal-line technology and video assistant referee (VAR) systems.

In the Finals, if the scores were level at the end of normal time:

- In the final, 30 minutes of extra time were played. If the score was still level after extra time, the winners were determined by a penalty shoot-out.
- In the semi-finals and third place play-off, extra time was not played, and the winners were determined by a penalty shoot-out.

== Venue ==
Initially, the competition was scheduled to be held in Texas, with the BBVA Stadium and NRG Stadium in Houston hosting the semi-final matches, and the AT&T Stadium in Arlington hosting the third place play-off and final. However, the planned venues were put into doubt following the tournament's suspension.

CONCACAF announced the city of Denver, Colorado as the new hosts of the event on April 15, 2021, with Empower Field at Mile High hosting the two semi-finals, third place play-off, and final.

City	Stadium	Location of the host city of the 2021 CONCACAF Nations League Finals.
Denver	Empower Field at Mile High	Location of the host city of the 2021 CONCACAF Nations League Finals.
Capacity: 76,125		Location of the host city of the 2021 CONCACAF Nations League Finals.

== Qualified teams ==
The four group winners of League A qualified for the Nations League Finals.

Group	Winners	Date of qualification	CONCACAF Rankings June 2021	FIFA Rankings May 2021
A	United States (host)	November 19, 2019	2	20
B	Mexico	November 15, 2019	1	11
C	Honduras	October 13, 2019	4	67
D	Costa Rica	November 17, 2019	3	50

== Seeding ==
The four teams were ranked based on their results in the group stage to determine the semi-final matchups.

Seed	Grp	Team	Pld	W	D	L	GF	GA	GD	Pts
1	B	Mexico	4	4	0	0	13	3	+10	12
2	C	Honduras	4	3	1	0	8	1	+7	10
3	A	United States (H)	4	3	0	1	15	3	+12	9
4	D	Costa Rica	4	1	3	0	4	3	+1	6

Source: CONCACAF
Rules for classification: 1) points; 2) goal difference; 3) goals scored; 4) away goals scored; 5) disciplinary points; 6) drawing of lots (Regulations Article 12.9).
(H) Hosts

== Squads ==
Each national team had to submit an initial squad of forty players, five of whom had to be goalkeepers, at least 24 days before the opening match of the tournament. The final squads of 23 players (including three goalkeepers) had to be submitted by May 27, 2021, seven days before the opening match of the tournament. If a player became injured or ill severely enough to prevent his participation in the tournament no less than 24 hours before his team's first match, he was allowed to be replaced by another player.

== Match officials ==
On May 24, 2021, CONCACAF announced the fourteen officials for the tournament.

Referees

- (Grenada) Reon Radix
- (Panama) John Pitti
- (Jamaica) Oshane Nation
- (Guatemala) Bryan López
- (Saint Kitts and Nevis) Tristley Bassue

Assistant referees

- (Antigua and Barbuda) Iroots Appleton
- (Jamaica) Jassett Kerr-Wilson
- (Guatemala) Juan Tipaz
- (Trinidad and Tobago) Caleb Wales
- (Suriname) Zachari Zeegelaar

Video assistant referees

- (Canada) Drew Fischer
- (Mexico) Erick Miranda
- (Jamaica) Daneon Parchment
- (United States) Chris Penso

== Schedule ==
The tournament was originally to be held in Texas from June 4 to 7, 2020. However, the tournament was postponed on 3 April 2020, due to the COVID-19 pandemic in the United States. On July 27, 2020, CONCACAF announced that the Finals would be held in March 2021, though on September 22, 2020, CONCACAF announced that the tournament was again rescheduled until June 2021.

On February 24, 2021, CONCACAF confirmed the dates for the rescheduled CONCACAF Nations League Finals: June 3 to 6, 2021, with the venue and times to be released at a later date.

On May 9, 2021, CONCACAF confirmed the fixture dates and times.

== Bracket ==
In the semi-finals and third place game, extra time was not played if tied after regulation, and the match was decided by a penalty shoot-out. In the final, extra time was played if tied after regulation, and if still tied after extra time, the match was decided by a penalty shoot-out (Regulations Article 12.11).

Semi-finals
June 3 – Denver
Honduras	0
United States	1
June 3 – Denver
Mexico (p)	0 (5)
Costa Rica	0 (4)

Final
June 6 – Denver
United States (a.e.t.)	3
Mexico	2
Third place play-off
June 6 – Denver
Honduras (p)	2 (5)
Costa Rica	2 (4)

All times are local, MDT (UTC−6).

== Semi-finals ==
=== Honduras vs United States ===
June 3, 2021
17:30 (Note: Though listed with a 17:30 kick-off time, the match began at 17:36.)

Honduras	0–1	United States
	Report	Pefok 89'

Empower Field at Mile High, Denver
Attendance: 34,451
Referee: Oshane Nation (Jamaica)

Honduras	United States

GK	22	Luis López
RB	23	Diego Rodríguez	(yellow card) 57'	(substituted off) 65'
CB	3	Maynor Figueroa (c)
CB	4	Marcelo Pereira		(substituted off) 74'
LB	2	Kevin Álvarez
RM	17	Jonathan Toro		(substituted off) 63'
CM	20	Deybi Flores
CM	10	Alexander López		(substituted off) 64'
LM	11	Rigoberto Rivas		(substituted off) 74'
CF	9	Anthony Lozano
CF	7	Alberth Elis	(yellow card) 90+6'
Substitutions:
MF	8	Edwin Rodríguez		(substituted on) 63'
MF	6	Bryan Acosta	(yellow card) 75'	(substituted on) 64'
DF	5	Éver Alvarado		(substituted on) 65'
MF	14	Boniek García		(substituted on) 74'
MF	21	Jhow Benavídez		(substituted on) 74'
Manager:
(Uruguay) Fabián Coito

GK	1	Zack Steffen (c)
RB	2	Sergiño Dest
CB	6	John Brooks
CB	15	Mark McKenzie	(yellow card) 84'
LB	5	Antonee Robinson		(substituted off) 78'
CM	8	Weston McKennie
CM	14	Jackson Yueill		(substituted off) 83'
RW	7	Giovanni Reyna		(substituted off) 78'
AM	17	Sebastian Lletget
LW	10	Christian Pulisic		(substituted off) 90+4'
CF	9	Josh Sargent		(substituted off) 78'
Substitutions:
FW	11	Brenden Aaronson		(substituted on) 78'
DF	20	Reggie Cannon		(substituted on) 78'
FW	16	Jordan Pefok		(substituted on) 78'
MF	23	Kellyn Acosta		(substituted on) 83'
DF	3	Matt Miazga		(substituted on) 90+4'
Other disciplinary actions:
MF	4	Tyler Adams	(yellow card) 86'
Manager:
Gregg Berhalter

Man of the Match:
Jordan Pefok (United States)

Assistant referees:
Zachari Zeegelaar (Suriname)
Jassett Kerr-Wilson (Jamaica)
Fourth official:
Reon Radix (Grenada)
Video assistant referee:
Erick Miranda (Mexico)
Assistant video assistant referee:
Daneon Parchment (Jamaica)

=== Mexico vs Costa Rica ===
June 3, 2021
20:00 (Note: Though listed with a 20:00 kick-off time, the match began at 20:36.)

Mexico	0–0	Costa Rica
	Report
Penalties
Antuna (penalty missed); Lozano (penalty scored); Pineda (penalty scored); Pulido (penalty scored); Romo (penalty scored); Gallardo (penalty scored)	5–4	(penalty scored) Venegas; (penalty missed) Duarte; (penalty scored) Alfaro; (penalty scored) Lassiter; (penalty scored) Calvo; (penalty missed) Cruz

Empower Field at Mile High, Denver
Attendance: 34,451
Referee: Bryan López (Guatemala)

Mexico	Costa Rica

GK	13	Guillermo Ochoa
CB	2	Néstor Araujo
CB	4	Edson Álvarez	(yellow card) 84'
CB	15	Héctor Moreno	(yellow card) 90+3'
RM	20	Uriel Antuna	(yellow card) 90'
CM	16	Héctor Herrera		(substituted off) 78'
CM	18	Andrés Guardado (c)		(substituted off) 58'
LM	19	Gerardo Arteaga		(substituted off) 68'
RW	14	Diego Lainez		(substituted off) 58'
CF	9	Henry Martín		(substituted off) 58'
LW	22	Hirving Lozano
Substitutions:
DF	21	Luis Rodríguez		(substituted on) 58'
DF	7	Luis Romo		(substituted on) 58'
FW	11	Alan Pulido		(substituted on) 58'
DF	23	Jesús Gallardo		(substituted on) 68'
MF	10	Orbelín Pineda		(substituted on) 78'
Manager:
(Argentina) Gerardo Martino

GK	23	Leonel Moreira
RB	4	Keysher Fuller
CB	6	Óscar Duarte
CB	15	Francisco Calvo	(yellow card) 21'
LB	8	Bryan Oviedo
CM	10	Bryan Ruiz (c)		(substituted off) 62'
CM	17	Yeltsin Tejeda
CM	5	Celso Borges		(substituted off) 82'
RW	21	Alonso Martínez	(yellow card) 54'	(substituted off) 62'
CF	12	Joel Campbell		(substituted off) 85'
LW	11	Randall Leal		(substituted off) 85'
Substitutions:
FW	2	Ariel Lassiter		(substituted on) 62'
MF	13	Allan Cruz	(yellow card) 90'	(substituted on) 62'
MF	14	Bernald Alfaro		(substituted on) 82'
FW	7	Johan Venegas		(substituted on) 85'
FW	9	Jurguens Montenegro		(substituted on) 85'
Manager:
(Costa Rica) Rónald González Brenes

Man of the Match:
Guillermo Ochoa (Mexico)

Assistant referees:
Juan Tipaz (Guatemala)
Caleb Wales (Trinidad and Tobago)
Fourth official:
Tristley Bassue (Saint Kitts and Nevis)
Video assistant referee:
Drew Fischer (Canada)
Assistant video assistant referee:
Chris Penso (United States)

== Third place play-off ==
June 6, 2021
16:30 (Note: Though listed with a 16:30 kick-off time, the match began at 16:36.)

Honduras	2–2	Costa Rica
E. Rodríguez 48'; Elis 80'	Report	Campbell 8'; Calvo 85'
Penalties
A. López (penalty scored); Elis (penalty scored); Benguché (penalty scored); Toro (penalty missed); Acosta (penalty scored); Alvarado (penalty scored)	5–4	(penalty scored) Venegas; (penalty scored) Calvo; (penalty missed) Lassiter; (penalty scored) Torres; (penalty scored) Mora; (penalty missed) Tejeda

Empower Field at Mile High, Denver
Attendance: 37,648
Referee: Reon Radix (Grenada)

Honduras	Costa Rica

GK	22	Luis López
RB	2	Kevin Álvarez	(yellow card) 70'
CB	4	Marcelo Pereira
CB	3	Maynor Figueroa (c)
LB	23	Diego Rodríguez		(substituted off) 78'
RM	11	Rigoberto Rivas		(substituted off) 46'
CM	20	Deybi Flores
CM	6	Bryan Acosta
LM	8	Edwin Rodríguez		(substituted off) 78'
CF	7	Alberth Elis
CF	9	Anthony Lozano		(substituted off) 63'
Substitutions:
MF	10	Alexander López		(substituted on) 46'
FW	12	Jorge Benguché		(substituted on) 63'
DF	5	Éver Alvarado		(substituted on) 78'
FW	17	Jonathan Toro		(substituted on) 78'
Manager:
(Uruguay) Fabián Coito

GK	23	Leonel Moreira
RB	4	Keysher Fuller
CB	6	Óscar Duarte
CB	15	Francisco Calvo
LB	8	Bryan Oviedo		(substituted off) 49'
DM	17	Yeltsin Tejeda
CM	10	Bryan Ruiz (c)		(substituted off) 58'
CM	5	Celso Borges		(substituted off) 58'
RW	21	Alonso Martínez	(yellow card) 76'
CF	12	Joel Campbell		(substituted off) 72'
LW	11	Randall Leal		(substituted off) 58'
Substitutions:
DF	22	Joseph Mora		(substituted on) 49'
FW	7	Johan Venegas		(substituted on) 58'
MF	13	Allan Cruz		(substituted on) 58'
FW	2	Ariel Lassiter		(substituted on) 58'
MF	20	Gerson Torres		(substituted on) 72'
Manager:
(Costa Rica) Rónald González Brenes

Man of the Match:
Luis López (Honduras)

Assistant referees:
Iroots Appleton (Antigua and Barbuda)
Zachari Zeegelaar (Suriname)
Fourth official:
Tristley Bassue (Saint Kitts and Nevis)
Video assistant referee:
Chris Penso (United States)
Assistant video assistant referee:
Erick Miranda (Mexico)

== Final ==
6 June 2021
19:00 (Note: Though listed with a 19:00 kick-off time, the match actually began at 19:36.)

United States	3–2 (a.e.t.)	Mexico
Reyna 27'; McKennie 82'; Pulisic 114' (pen.)	Report	Corona 2'; Lainez 79'

Empower Field at Mile High, Denver
Attendance: 37,648
Referee: John Pitti (Panama)

United States	Mexico

GK	1	Zack Steffen		(substituted off) 69'
CB	15	Mark McKenzie	(yellow card) 86'
CB	6	John Brooks	(yellow card) 10'
CB	13	Tim Ream		(substituted off) 83'
RM	22	DeAndre Yedlin	(yellow card) 90+4'	(substituted off) 105+1'
CM	8	Weston McKennie
CM	23	Kellyn Acosta	(yellow card) 49'
LM	2	Sergiño Dest		(substituted off) 60'
RW	7	Giovanni Reyna		(substituted off) 83'
CF	9	Josh Sargent		(substituted off) 68'
LW	10	Christian Pulisic (c)	(yellow card) 115'
Substitutions:
FW	21	Timothy Weah		(substituted on) 60'
FW	16	Jordan Pefok		(substituted on) 68'
GK	12	Ethan Horvath		(substituted on) 69'
MF	17	Sebastian Lletget		(substituted on) 83'
MF	4	Tyler Adams		(substituted on) 83'
DF	20	Reggie Cannon		(substituted on) 105+1'
Manager:
Gregg Berhalter

GK	13	Guillermo Ochoa (c)
CB	2	Néstor Araujo
CB	4	Edson Álvarez		(substituted off) 117'
CB	15	Héctor Moreno		(substituted off) 100'
RM	21	Luis Rodríguez
CM	16	Héctor Herrera	(yellow card) 90+2'	(substituted off) 100'
CM	8	Carlos Rodríguez		(substituted off) 66'
LM	23	Jesús Gallardo
RW	17	Jesús Corona		(substituted off) 66'
CF	20	Uriel Antuna		(substituted off) 78'
LW	22	Hirving Lozano	(yellow card) 111'
Substitutions:
DF	7	Luis Romo		(substituted on) 66'
FW	9	Henry Martín		(substituted on) 66'
MF	14	Diego Lainez		(substituted on) 78'
DF	3	Carlos Salcedo		(substituted on) 100'
MF	18	Andrés Guardado	(yellow card) 120+10'	(substituted on) 100'
MF	10	Orbelín Pineda		(substituted on) 117'
Manager:
(Argentina) Gerardo Martino			(red card) 110'

Man of the Match:
Ethan Horvath (United States)

Assistant referees:
Caleb Wales (Trinidad and Tobago)
Jassett Kerr-Wilson (Jamaica)
Fourth official:
Oshane Nation (Jamaica)
Video assistant referee:
Drew Fischer (Canada)
Assistant video assistant referee:
Daneon Parchment (Jamaica)

== Statistics ==
=== Goalscorers ===
There were 10 goals scored in 4 matches, for an average of 2.5 goals per match.

1 goal

- (Costa Rica) Francisco Calvo
- (Costa Rica) Joel Campbell
- (Honduras) Alberth Elis
- (Honduras) Edwin Rodríguez
- (Mexico) Jesús Corona
- (Mexico) Diego Lainez
- (United States) Weston McKennie
- (United States) Christian Pulisic
- (United States) Giovanni Reyna
- (United States) Jordan Pefok

== Awards ==
CONCACAF announced the following squad as the best eleven of the Finals after the conclusion of the tournament.

Weston McKennie was named MVP of the tournament, having scored a total of four goals across the group stage and Finals. Luis López was named best goalkeeper.

Best XI

Goalkeeper	Defenders	Midfielders	Forwards
(Honduras) Luis López	(United States) John Brooks (Costa Rica) Francisco Calvo (Mexico) Néstor Araujo	(United States) Weston McKennie (Mexico) Héctor Herrera (United States) Giovanni Reyna (Honduras) Edwin Rodríguez	(Mexico) Diego Lainez (United States) Christian Pulisic (Honduras) Alberth Elis
