= 2019–20 CONCACAF Nations League =

Inaugural season of an association football tournament

Tournament details
- Dates: Qualifying: 6 September 2018 – 24 March 2019; League phase: 5 September – 19 November 2019; Nations League Finals: 3–6 June 2021
- Teams: 41

Final positions
- Champions: United States (1st title)
- Runners-up: Mexico
- Third place: Honduras
- Fourth place: Costa Rica

Tournament statistics
- Matches played: 106
- Goals scored: 337 (3.18 per match)
- Top scorer: (Suriname) Gleofilo Vlijter (10 goals)
- Best player: (United States) Weston McKennie
- Best goalkeeper: (Honduras) Luis López
- Fair play award: Barbados

The 2019–20 CONCACAF Nations League was the inaugural season of the CONCACAF Nations League, an international association football competition involving the men's national teams of the 41 member associations of CONCACAF. The Nations League qualifying tournament also served as part of the qualifying process for the 2019 CONCACAF Gold Cup, which was expanded from twelve to sixteen teams. The group stage of the tournament also served as qualification for the 2021 CONCACAF Gold Cup. The Finals, which decided the inaugural champions, was originally scheduled to be played in June 2020. However, on 3 April 2020 CONCACAF postponed the event until March 2021 due to the COVID-19 pandemic. On 22 September 2020, it was announced that the event was again rescheduled until June 2021. On 24 February 2021, CONCACAF confirmed the dates for the rescheduled Nations League Finals, 3 and 6 June 2021 with the venue later confirmed as Empower Field at Mile High in Denver, Colorado, United States.

== Format ==
The format proposals were first formally investigated at the XXXII CONCACAF Ordinary Congress in Oranjestad, Aruba on 8 April 2017. The tournament was officially confirmed by CONCACAF in November 2017. The format and schedule of the Nations Leagues was announced on 7 March 2018, 10:00 EST (UTC−5), at The Temple House in Miami Beach, Florida, United States.

The Nations League began with a one-off qualifying phase, played across four matchdays from September 2018 to March 2019. The results determined the composition of the leagues for the group phase of the tournament. Apart from the six teams which participated in the 2018 FIFA World Cup qualifying hexagonal, the other 34 teams (Guatemala could not enter due to FIFA suspension) entered qualifying. Each team played four matches, two home and two away, with the results compiled into an aggregate table. Based on the standings, the teams were divided into tiers for the group phase of the inaugural edition of the CONCACAF Nations League. Moreover, the top ten teams in the qualifying phase qualified for the 2019 CONCACAF Gold Cup, joining the six hexagonal participants.

The group phase of the Nations League, consisting of three tiered leagues, was played in the official FIFA match windows in September, October, and November 2019. All eligible teams were assigned by sporting performance into Leagues A, B, and C. Each league was sub-divided into four groups, featuring promotion and relegation, in which the teams competed in a home-and-away, round-robin format over the course of the group phase.

League A contained twelve teams, split into four groups of three teams. The six hexagonal participants were joined by the top six teams from qualifying. The four group winners qualified for the Nations League final championship, played in June 2021, which determined the champions of the new competition. The four teams which finished last in their group were relegated to League B for the next edition of the tournament.

League B consisted of sixteen teams, split into four groups of four teams. The league contained teams which finished from 7th to 22nd in qualifying. The four group winners were promoted to League A, while the four teams which finished last in their group were relegated to League C for the next edition.

League C consisted of the remaining thirteen member associations, the teams which finished 23rd to 34th in qualifying, along with Guatemala, who did not enter qualifying. The league contained four groups, with three groups of three teams and one group of four teams. The four group winners were promoted to League B for the next edition of the competition.

In September 2019, it was announced that the Nations League would also provide qualification for all sixteen teams participating in the 2021 CONCACAF Gold Cup (no teams would qualify automatically).

The following teams qualified for the Gold Cup after group play concluded in November 2019:

- The top two teams from each of the four League A groups
- The winners of each of the four League B groups

Initially, the final four spots at the Gold Cup were to be determined by two-legged matches between the second-place finishers of League B and the first-place finishers of League C, to be played in March 2020. The four winners of this round would then advance to the second round, to face the third-place finishers of League A, in matches to be played in June 2020. The four matchup winners of the second round would qualify for the 2021 Gold Cup. However, following the COVID-19 pandemic, this format was changed. In July 2020, CONCACAF announced that the qualifiers would be played by the twelve aforementioned teams as a centralized preliminary round in the United States, in the week prior to the 2021 Gold Cup group stage. In September 2020, CONCACAF announced that Qatar were invited to the Gold Cup as guests, and that the qualification tournament would determine the last three teams to participate in the group stage of the Gold Cup. The qualification tournament will feature two rounds, with the twelve participating teams divided into six one-off ties in the first round. The six winners will advance to the second round, with the winners of the three one-off matches qualifying for the Gold Cup.

=== Tiebreakers ===
The ranking of teams in each group was determined as follows (Regulations Article 12.7):

1. Points obtained in all group matches (three points for a win, one for a draw, zero for a loss);
2. Goal difference in all group matches;
3. Number of goals scored in all group matches;
4. Points obtained in the matches played between the teams in question;
5. Goal difference in the matches played between the teams in question;
6. Number of goals scored in the matches played between the teams in question;
7. Number of away goals scored in the matches played between the teams in question (if the tie was only between two teams);
8. Fair play points in all group matches (only one deduction could be applied to a player in a single match):
  - Yellow card: −1 points;
  - Indirect red card (second yellow card): −3 points;
  - Direct red card: −4 points;
  - Yellow card and direct red card: −5 points;
9. Drawing of lots.

== Entrants ==
All of CONCACAF's 41 member associations participated in the competition. The six teams which participated in the fifth round (hexagonal) of 2018 FIFA World Cup qualification received automatic entry into League A. Of the remaining 35 teams, 34 entered into qualifying to determine which league they entered. The National Football Federation of Guatemala was suspended by FIFA in October 2016, and therefore Guatemala was ineligible to enter qualifying after missing the deadline of 1 March 2018. However, as the suspension was lifted by FIFA in May 2018, they automatically entered into League C of the group phase.

Key to colours
2018 WCQ Hexagonal participants automatically in League A
Remaining CONCACAF members compete in qualifying
Association suspended at deadline to enter qualifying automatically in League C

Rank	Team	Pts
1	Mexico	2,047
2	United States	1,853
3	Costa Rica	1,845
4	Panama	1,700
5	Honduras	1,669
6	Jamaica	1,516
7	Canada	1,448
8	Guatemala (Note: Guatemala was suspended by FIFA in October 2016, and therefore was ineligible to enter qualifying after missing the entry deadline of 1 March 2018.)	1,417
9	Haiti	1,348
10	El Salvador	1,347
11	Trinidad and Tobago	1,339
12	Martinique (Note: Full CONCACAF member, but not a FIFA member.)	1,271
13	Cuba	1,146
14	French Guiana	1,108
15	Guadeloupe	1,089
16	Nicaragua	1,032
17	Saint Kitts and Nevis	1,023
18	Curaçao	1,018
19	Suriname	991
20	Antigua and Barbuda	946
21	Dominican Republic	925

Rank	Team	Pts
22	Bermuda	924
23	Guyana	914
24	Belize	853
25	Bonaire	799
26	Grenada	795
27	Saint Vincent and the Grenadines	793
28	Saint Lucia	773
29	Barbados	731
30	Puerto Rico	693
31	Bahamas	627
32	Dominica	563
33	Aruba	559
34	Cayman Islands	543
35	Turks and Caicos Islands	483
36	Montserrat	435
37	U.S. Virgin Islands	401
38	Saint Martin	352
39	Sint Maarten	336
40	Anguilla	261
41	British Virgin Islands	261

== Schedule ==
Below was the schedule of the 2019–20 CONCACAF Nations League.

The Nations League Finals were originally scheduled for the international window from 23 to 31 March 2020. However, on 5 August 2019 CONCACAF announced that the tournament would instead be played in June 2020. The schedule for the tournament was announced on 9 March 2020, with the semi-finals on 4 June, and the third place play-off and final on 7 June 2020. On 3 April 2020, the tournament was postponed due to the COVID-19 pandemic. On 27 July 2020, CONCACAF announced that the tournament would be held in the international window from 22 to 30 March 2021. However, due to the postponement of the first round of CONCACAF World Cup qualifying, on 22 September 2020 CONCACAF announced that the final tournament would be held in June 2021.

Stage	Round	Dates
Qualifying	Matchday 1	6–11 September 2018
Qualifying	Matchday 2	11–16 October 2018
Qualifying	Matchday 3	16–20 November 2018
Qualifying	Matchday 4	21–24 March 2019
League phase	Matchday 1	5–7 September 2019
League phase	Matchday 2	8–10 September 2019
League phase	Matchday 3	10–12 October 2019
League phase	Matchday 4	13–15 October 2019
League phase	Matchday 5	14–16 November 2019
League phase	Matchday 6	17–19 November 2019
Finals	Semi-finals	3 June 2021
Finals	Third place play-off	6 June 2021
Finals	Final	6 June 2021

The fixture list for the group phase was confirmed by CONCACAF on 21 May 2019.

== Qualifying ==
The draw for the qualifying fixtures was held on 7 March 2018 directly after the launch event of the CONCACAF Nations League. The 34 teams were seeded into four pots based on their position in the March 2018 CONCACAF Ranking Index. A computerized pre-draw produced a "master schedule", creating 17 fixtures for each matchday. The teams in each pot were then drawn to the corresponding positions in the schedule. The computer model assured that no teams would face each other more than once, and that each team would play two home and two away matches. Based on their results, the teams were divided into tiers for the main round of the inaugural edition of the CONCACAF Nations League. Moreover, the top ten teams qualified for the 2019 CONCACAF Gold Cup to join the six hexagonal participants.

Pos	Team	Pld	W	D	L	GF	GA	GD	Pts	Qualification
1	Haiti	4	4	0	0	19	2	+17	12	Qualification for League A and 2019 CONCACAF Gold Cup
2	Canada	4	4	0	0	18	1	+17	12	Qualification for League A and 2019 CONCACAF Gold Cup
3	Martinique	4	4	0	0	10	2	+8	12	Qualification for League A and 2019 CONCACAF Gold Cup
4	Curaçao	4	3	0	1	22	2	+20	9	Qualification for League A and 2019 CONCACAF Gold Cup
5	Bermuda	4	3	0	1	17	4	+13	9	Qualification for League A and 2019 CONCACAF Gold Cup
6	Cuba	4	3	0	1	15	2	+13	9	Qualification for League A and 2019 CONCACAF Gold Cup
7	Guyana	4	3	0	1	14	3	+11	9	Qualification for League B and 2019 CONCACAF Gold Cup
8	Jamaica	4	3	0	1	12	3	+9	9	Qualification for League B and 2019 CONCACAF Gold Cup
9	Nicaragua	4	3	0	1	9	2	+7	9	Qualification for League B and 2019 CONCACAF Gold Cup
10	El Salvador	4	3	0	1	7	2	+5	9	Qualification for League B and 2019 CONCACAF Gold Cup
11	Montserrat	4	3	0	1	6	3	+3	9	Qualification for League B
12	Suriname	4	2	1	1	8	2	+6	7	Qualification for League B
13	Saint Lucia	4	2	1	1	7	4	+3	7	Qualification for League B
14	Dominica	4	2	1	1	6	5	+1	7	Qualification for League B
15	Saint Kitts and Nevis	4	2	0	2	11	3	+8	6	Qualification for League B
16	Dominican Republic	4	2	0	2	9	4	+5	6	Qualification for League B
17	Belize	4	2	0	2	6	3	+3	6	Qualification for League B
18	Antigua and Barbuda	4	2	0	2	10	8	+2	6	Qualification for League B
19	French Guiana	4	2	0	2	8	6	+2	6	Qualification for League B
20	Saint Vincent and the Grenadines	4	2	0	2	5	6	−1	6	Qualification for League B
21	Grenada	4	2	0	2	7	14	−7	6	Qualification for League B
22	Aruba	4	1	1	2	5	6	−1	4	Qualification for League B
23	Guadeloupe	4	1	1	2	3	7	−4	4	Qualification for League C
24	Turks and Caicos Islands	4	1	1	2	5	23	−18	4	Qualification for League C
25	Barbados	4	1	0	3	3	7	−4	3	Qualification for League C
26	Bonaire	4	1	0	3	3	14	−11	3	Qualification for League C
27	U.S. Virgin Islands	4	1	0	3	3	16	−13	3	Qualification for League C
28	Sint Maarten	4	1	0	3	4	30	−26	3	Qualification for League C
29	Cayman Islands	4	0	1	3	1	9	−8	1	Qualification for League C
30	British Virgin Islands	4	0	1	3	3	13	−10	1	Qualification for League C
31	Anguilla	4	0	1	3	1	15	−14	1 (Note: Away goals: Anguilla 1, Bahamas 0.)	Qualification for League C
32	Bahamas	4	0	1	3	1	15	−14	1	Qualification for League C
33	Puerto Rico	4	0	0	4	0	5	−5	0	Qualification for League C
34	Saint Martin	4	0	0	4	5	22	−17	0	Qualification for League C

Source: CONCACAF
Rules for classification: Qualifying tiebreakers

== Seeding ==
The 41 CONCACAF members were allocated into pots of the league for which they qualified. Teams were seeded into pots based on their position in the November 2018 CONCACAF Ranking Index. League A had three pots of four teams, while League B had four pots of four teams. League C had three pots, with pots 1 and 2 featuring four teams each, and pot 3 featuring five teams.

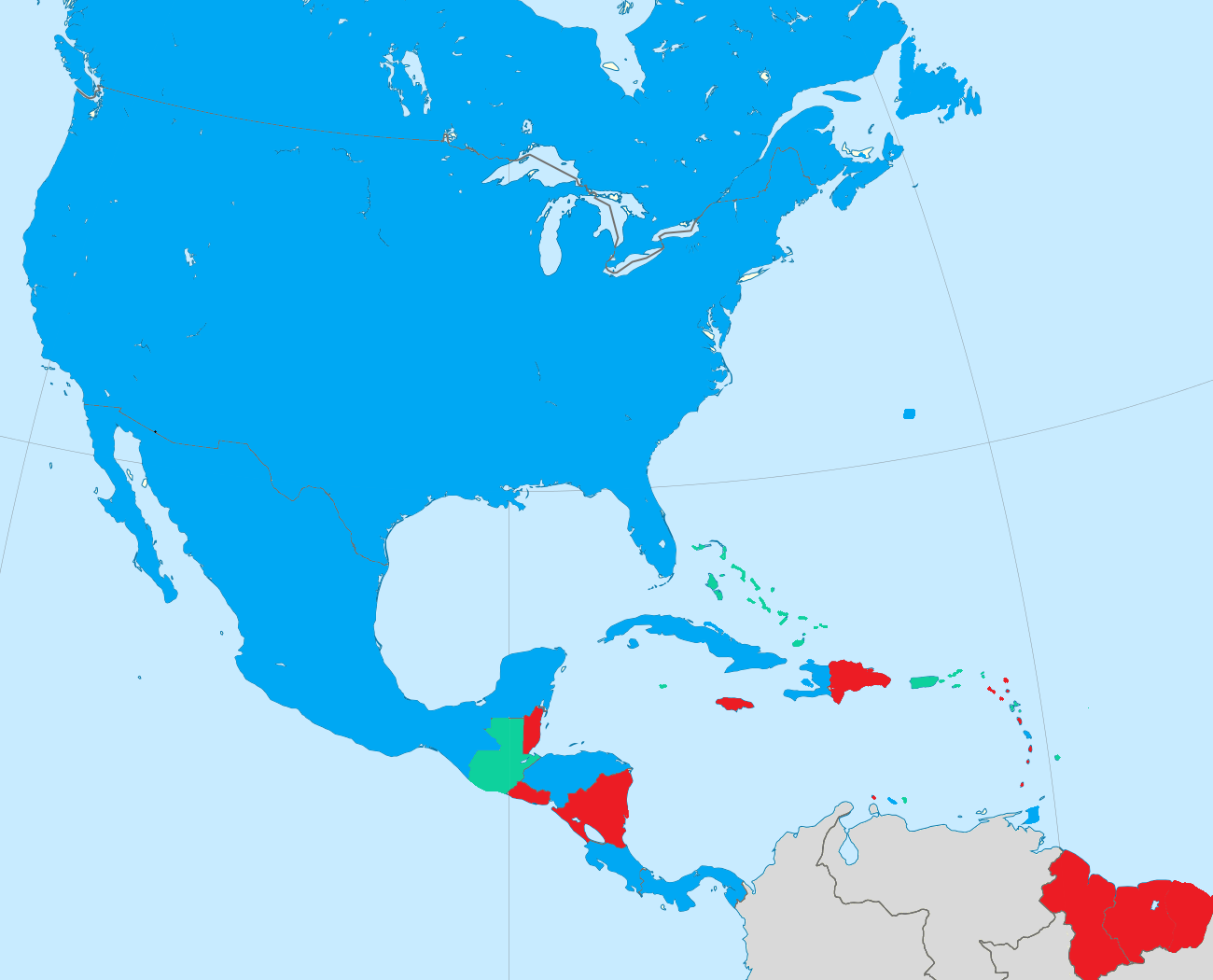
Map showing the leagues each national team participated in. League A League B League C

League A
Pot	Team	Pts	Rank
1	Mexico	1,998	1
1	United States	1,863	2
1	Costa Rica	1,752	3
1	Honduras	1,630	4
2	Panama	1,579	5
2	Canada	1,471	7
2	Haiti	1,359	10
2	Trinidad and Tobago	1,342	11
3	Martinique	1,286	12
3	Cuba	1,152	13
3	Curaçao	1,079	15
3	Bermuda	865	23

League B
Pot	Team	Pts	Rank
1	Jamaica	1,507	6
1	El Salvador	1,380	9
1	Nicaragua	1,083	14
1	French Guiana	1,057	16
2	Saint Kitts and Nevis	1,018	18
2	Dominican Republic	983	19
2	Suriname	975	20
2	Guyana	953	21
3	Antigua and Barbuda	930	22
3	Belize	831	24
3	Saint Vincent and the Grenadines	821	25
3	Saint Lucia	813	26
4	Grenada	749	28
4	Aruba	638	31
4	Dominica	593	32
4	Montserrat	478	35

League C
Pot	Team	Pts	Rank
1	Guatemala	1,419	8
1	Guadeloupe	1,054	17
1	Bonaire	766	27
1	Barbados	707	29
2	Puerto Rico	665	30
2	Bahamas	582	33
2	Cayman Islands	532	34
2	Turks and Caicos Islands	453	36
3	U.S. Virgin Islands	392	37
3	Saint Martin	338	38
3	Sint Maarten	328	39
3	British Virgin Islands	257	40
3	Anguilla	250	41

The draw for the group phase took place at The Chelsea Theater in Paradise, Nevada, United States on 27 March 2019, 22:00 EDT (19:00 local time, PDT).

== League A ==
=== Group A ===
Pos	Team	Pld	W	D	L	GF	GA	GD	Pts	Qualification or relegation	(United States)	(Canada)	(Cuba)
1	United States	4	3	0	1	15	3	+12	9	Qualification for Finals and Gold Cup	—	4–1	7–0
2	Canada	4	3	0	1	10	4	+6	9	Qualification for Gold Cup	2–0	—	6–0
3	Cuba (R)	4	0	0	4	0	18	−18	0	Gold Cup prelims and League B	0–4	0–1	—

Source: CONCACAF
(R) Relegated

=== Group B ===
Pos	Team	Pld	W	D	L	GF	GA	GD	Pts	Qualification or relegation	(Mexico)	(Panama)	(Bermuda)
1	Mexico	4	4	0	0	13	3	+10	12	Qualification for Finals and Gold Cup	—	3–1	2–1
2	Panama	4	1	0	3	5	9	−4	3	Qualification for Gold Cup	0–3	—	0–2
3	Bermuda (R)	4	1	0	3	5	11	−6	3	Gold Cup prelims and League B	1–5	1–4	—

Source: CONCACAF
(R) Relegated

=== Group C ===
Pos	Team	Pld	W	D	L	GF	GA	GD	Pts	Qualification or relegation	(Honduras)	(Martinique)	(Trinidad and Tobago)
1	Honduras	4	3	1	0	8	1	+7	10	Qualification for Finals and Gold Cup	—	1–0	4–0
2	Martinique	4	0	3	1	4	5	−1	3	Qualification for Gold Cup	1–1	—	1–1
3	Trinidad and Tobago (R)	4	0	2	2	3	9	−6	2	Gold Cup prelims and League B	0–2	2–2	—

Source: CONCACAF
(R) Relegated

=== Group D ===
Pos	Team	Pld	W	D	L	GF	GA	GD	Pts	Qualification or relegation	(Costa Rica)	(Curaçao)	(Haiti)
1	Costa Rica	4	1	3	0	4	3	+1	6	Qualification for Finals and Gold Cup	—	0–0	1–1
2	Curaçao	4	1	2	1	3	3	0	5	Qualification for Gold Cup, later withdrew (Note: Curaçao, who had originally qualified for the 2021 CONCACAF Gold Cup through the Nations League, eventually had to withdraw just before the start of the tournament due to an outbreak of COVID-19 in the team.)	1–2	—	1–0
3	Haiti (R)	4	0	3	1	3	4	−1	3	Gold Cup prelims and League B	1–1	1–1	—

Source: CONCACAF
(R) Relegated

=== Nations League Finals ===
==== Seeding ====
The four teams were ranked based on their results in the group stage to determine the semi-final matchups.

Seed	Grp	Team	Pld	W	D	L	GF	GA	GD	Pts
1	B	Mexico	4	4	0	0	13	3	+10	12
2	C	Honduras	4	3	1	0	8	1	+7	10
3	A	United States (H)	4	3	0	1	15	3	+12	9
4	D	Costa Rica	4	1	3	0	4	3	+1	6

Source: CONCACAF
Rules for classification: 1) points; 2) goal difference; 3) goals scored; 4) away goals scored; 5) disciplinary points; 6) drawing of lots (Regulations Article 12.9).
(H) Hosts

==== Bracket ====
Semi-finals
3 June – Denver
Honduras	0
United States	1
3 June – Denver
Mexico (p)	0 (5)
Costa Rica	0 (4)

Final
6 June – Denver
United States (a.e.t.)	3
Mexico	2
Third place play-off
6 June – Denver
Honduras (p)	2 (5)
Costa Rica	2 (4)

All times are local, MDT (UTC−6).

==== Semi-finals ====
3 June 2021
17:30 (Note: Though listed with a 17:30 kick-off time, the match began at 17:36.)

Honduras	0–1	United States
	Report	Pefok 89'

Empower Field at Mile High, Denver
Attendance: 34,451
Referee: Oshane Nation (Jamaica)

3 June 2021
20:00 (Note: Though listed with a 20:00 kick-off time, the match began at 20:36.)

Mexico	0–0 (a.e.t.)	Costa Rica
	Report
Penalties
Antuna (penalty missed); Lozano (penalty scored); Pineda (penalty scored); Pulido (penalty scored); Romo (penalty scored); Gallardo (penalty scored)	5–4	(penalty scored) Venegas; (penalty missed) Duarte; (penalty scored) Alfaro; (penalty scored) Lassiter; (penalty scored) Calvo; (penalty missed) Cruz

Empower Field at Mile High, Denver
Attendance: 34,451
Referee: Bryan López (Guatemala)

==== Third place play-off ====
6 June 2021
16:30 (Note: Though listed with a 16:30 kick-off time, the match began at 16:36.)

Honduras	2–2 (a.e.t.)	Costa Rica
E. Rodríguez 48'; Elis 80'	Report	Campbell 8'; Calvo 85'
Penalties
A. López (penalty scored); Elis (penalty scored); Benguché (penalty scored); Toro (penalty missed); Acosta (penalty scored); Alvarado (penalty scored)	5–4	(penalty scored) Venegas; (penalty scored) Calvo; (penalty missed) Lassiter; (penalty scored) Torres; (penalty scored) Mora; (penalty missed) Tejeda

Empower Field at Mile High, Denver
Attendance: 37,648
Referee: Reon Radix (Grenada)

==== Final ====
6 June 2021
19:00 (Note: Though listed with a 19:00 kick-off time, the match actually began at 19:36.)

United States	3–2 (a.e.t.)	Mexico
Reyna 27'; McKennie 82'; Pulisic 114' (pen.)	Report	Corona 2'; Lainez 79'

Empower Field at Mile High, Denver
Attendance: 37,648
Referee: John Pitti (Panama)

== League B ==
=== Group A ===
Pos	Team	Pld	W	D	L	GF	GA	GD	Pts	Promotion, qualification or relegation	(Grenada)	(French Guiana)	(Belize)	(Saint Kitts and Nevis)
1	Grenada (P)	6	4	2	0	8	4	+4	14	League A and Gold Cup	—	1–0	3–2	2–1
2	French Guiana	6	2	2	2	8	6	+2	8	Advance to Gold Cup prelims	0–0	—	3–0	3–1
3	Belize	6	2	0	4	6	12	−6	6		1–2	2–0	—	0–4
4	Saint Kitts and Nevis (R)	6	1	2	3	8	8	0	5	Relegation to League C	0–0	2–2	0–1	—

Source: CONCACAF
(P) Promoted; (R) Relegated

=== Group B ===
Pos	Team	Pld	W	D	L	GF	GA	GD	Pts	Promotion, qualification or relegation	(El Salvador)	(Montserrat)	(Dominican Republic)	(Saint Lucia)
1	El Salvador (P)	6	5	0	1	10	1	+9	15	League A and Gold Cup	—	1–0	2–0	3–0
2	Montserrat	6	2	2	2	4	5	−1	8	Advance to Gold Cup prelims	0–2	—	2–1	1–1
3	Dominican Republic	6	2	1	3	5	5	0	7		1–0	0–0	—	3–0
4	Saint Lucia (R)	6	1	1	4	2	10	−8	4	Relegation to League C	0–2	0–1	1–0	—

Source: CONCACAF
(P) Promoted; (R) Relegated

=== Group C ===
Pos	Team	Pld	W	D	L	GF	GA	GD	Pts	Promotion, qualification or relegation	(Jamaica)	(Guyana)	(Antigua and Barbuda)	(Aruba)
1	Jamaica (P)	6	5	1	0	21	1	+20	16	League A and Gold Cup	—	1–1	6–0	2–0
2	Guyana	6	3	1	2	12	10	+2	10	Advance to Gold Cup prelims	0–4	—	5–1	4–2
3	Antigua and Barbuda	6	3	0	3	8	17	−9	9		0–2	2–1	—	2–1
4	Aruba (R)	6	0	0	6	5	18	−13	0	Relegation to League C	0–6	0–1	2–3	—

Source: CONCACAF
(P) Promoted; (R) Relegated

=== Group D ===
Pos	Team	Pld	W	D	L	GF	GA	GD	Pts	Promotion, qualification or relegation	(Suriname)	(Saint Vincent and the Grenadines)	(Nicaragua)	(Dominica)
1	Suriname (P)	6	4	1	1	16	5	+11	13	League A and Gold Cup	—	0–1	6–0	4–0
2	Saint Vincent and the Grenadines	6	3	2	1	6	4	+2	11	Advance to Gold Cup prelims	2–2	—	1–0	1–0
3	Nicaragua	6	2	1	3	9	11	−2	7		1–2	1–1	—	3–1
4	Dominica (R)	6	1	0	5	3	14	−11	3	Relegation to League C	1–2	1–0	0–4	—

Source: CONCACAF
(P) Promoted; (R) Relegated

== League C ==
=== Group A ===
Pos	Team	Pld	W	D	L	GF	GA	GD	Pts	Promotion or qualification	(Barbados)	(Cayman Islands)	(Collectivity of Saint Martin)	(United States Virgin Islands)
1	Barbados (P)	6	4	0	2	14	4	+10	12	League B and Gold Cup prelims	—	3–0	4–0	1–0
2	Cayman Islands	6	4	0	2	7	8	−1	12		3–2	—	1–0	1–0
3	Saint Martin	6	3	0	3	7	8	−1	9		1–0	3–0	—	1–2
4	U.S. Virgin Islands	6	1	0	5	3	11	−8	3		0–4	0–2	1–2	—

Source: CONCACAF
(P) Promoted

=== Group B ===
Pos	Team	Pld	W	D	L	GF	GA	GD	Pts	Promotion or qualification	(The Bahamas)	(Bonaire)	(British Virgin Islands)
1	Bahamas (P)	4	3	1	0	10	2	+8	10	League B and Gold Cup prelims	—	2–1	3–0
2	Bonaire	4	2	1	1	10	8	+2	7		1–1	—	4–2
3	British Virgin Islands	4	0	0	4	5	15	−10	0		0–4	3–4	—

Source: CONCACAF
(P) Promoted

=== Group C ===
Pos	Team	Pld	W	D	L	GF	GA	GD	Pts	Promotion or qualification	(Guatemala)	(Puerto Rico)	(Anguilla)
1	Guatemala (P)	4	4	0	0	25	0	+25	12	League B and Gold Cup prelims	—	5–0	10–0
2	Puerto Rico	4	2	0	2	6	12	−6	6		0–5	—	3–0
3	Anguilla	4	0	0	4	2	21	−19	0		0–5	2–3	—

Source: CONCACAF
(P) Promoted

=== Group D ===
Pos	Team	Pld	W	D	L	GF	GA	GD	Pts	Promotion or qualification	(Guadeloupe)	(Turks and Caicos Islands)	(Sint Maarten)
1	Guadeloupe (P)	4	4	0	0	20	2	+18	12	League B and Gold Cup prelims	—	10–0	5–1
2	Turks and Caicos Islands	4	2	0	2	8	17	−9	6		0–3	—	3–2
3	Sint Maarten	4	0	0	4	6	15	−9	0		1–2	2–5	—

Source: CONCACAF
(P) Promoted

== Top goalscorers ==
League A
Rank	Player	Goals
1	(United States) Jordan Morris	4
1	(United States) Weston McKennie	4
3	(Bermuda) Nahki Wells	3
3	(Canada) Junior Hoilett	3
3	(Costa Rica) Francisco Calvo	3
3	(Honduras) Alberth Elis	3
3	(Mexico) José Juan Macías	3
3	(United States) Josh Sargent	3

League B
Rank	Player	Goals
1	(Suriname) Gleofilo Vlijter	10
2	(Grenada) Jamal Charles	6
3	(Guyana) Trayon Bobb	4
3	(Jamaica) Shamar Nicholson	4
3	(Saint Kitts and Nevis) Rowan Liburd	4

League C
Rank	Player	Goals
1	(Guadeloupe) Raphael Mirval	7
2	(Guatemala) Edi Danilo Guerra	6
3	(Sint Maarten) Gerwin Lake	5
4	(Guatemala) Marvin Ceballos	4
4	(Collectivity of Saint Martin) Yannick Bellechasse	4
4	(Turks and Caicos Islands) Billy Forbes	4
