= Alberth Elis =

Honduran footballer (born 1996)

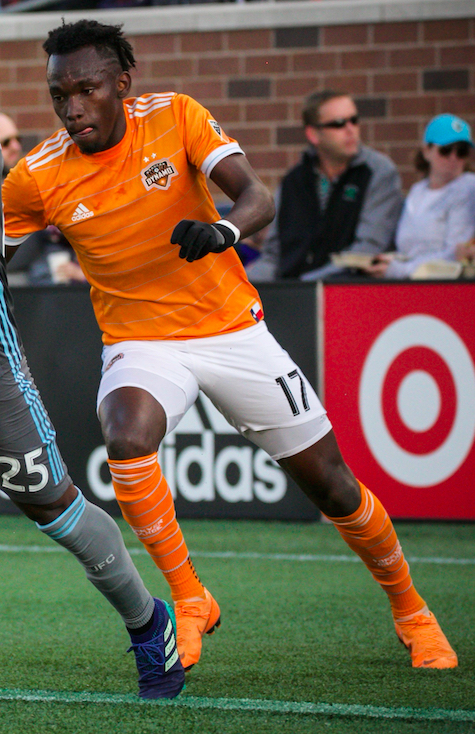
- Elis with Houston Dynamo in 2018

Personal information
- Full name: Alberth Josué Elis Martínez
- Date of birth: 12 February 1996 (age 30)
- Place of birth: San Pedro Sula, Honduras
- Height: 1.85 m (6 ft 1 in)
- Positions: Forward; winger

Team information
- Current team: Marathón

Youth career
- Real España
- Olimpia

Senior career*
Years	Team	Apps	(Gls)
2013–2016	Olimpia	62	(25)
2016–2017	Monterrey	5	(0)
2017	→ Houston Dynamo (loan)	26	(10)
2018–2020	Houston Dynamo	62	(24)
2020–2022	Boavista	31	(8)
2021–2022	→ Bordeaux (loan)	20	(9)
2022–2024	Bordeaux	35	(6)
2023	→ Brest (loan)	10	(0)
2025	Olimpia	17	(3)
2025–2026	Marítimo	7	(0)
2026–	Marathón	0	(0)

International career^{‡}
2013	Honduras U17	11	(5)
2014–2015	Honduras U20	10	(4)
2015–2016	Honduras U23	11	(6)
2014–2023	Honduras	64	(13)
Medal record
Men's football
Representing Honduras
CONCACAF Nations League
Third place	2021
- * Club domestic league appearances and goals as of 5 June 2026 ‡ National team caps and goals as of 29 June 2023

Alberth Josué Elis Martínez (born 12 February 1996), nicknamed La Panterita (The Little Panther), is a Honduran professional footballer who plays as a forward or winger for Liga Nacional club Marathón.

== Club career ==
=== Youth ===
Elis first played for the youth team of Real España in San Pedro Sula. He then moved to Olimpia, where he made his professional debut in September 2013.

=== Olimpia ===
Elis made his professional debut on 2 September 2013 in a Liga Nacional match against Motagua. Elis came on as substitute for Anthony Lozano to help secure a 2–1 win in the Clasico Capitalino. He scored his first professional goal on 5 August 2014 to give Olimpia a 1–0 win over Alpha United in a CONCACAF Champions League match. His first league goal came on 24 August 2014 in a 4–0 win over Marathón. Elis would score again on 21 September against Vida as well as score the winner in a 2–1 victory against his former team Real España on 28 September.

=== Monterrey ===
After 61 games and 25 goals with Olimpia, Elis joined Monterrey on 26 August 2016. He made his debut for Monterrey on 10 September 2016 in a 0–0 draw with Club Tijuana. After only five appearances and no goals or assists, Monterrey loaned Elis to MLS club Houston Dynamo for the 2017 season.

=== Houston Dynamo ===
On 4 March 2017, Elis made his debut with the Dynamo in the first game of the 2017 season; a 2–1 win over the defending champions Seattle Sounders FC. Elis scored his first Dynamo goal in the team's next game as they won 3–1 against the Columbus Crew. He picked up his first assist for Houston on 18 March in a 4–2 loss to Portland Timbers. On 27 September Elis scored two late goals to help the Dynamo overcome a 3–1 deficit. He helped the team qualify for the MLS Playoffs for the first time since 2013. In the opening game of the playoffs, Elis scored the winning goal in extra time against Sporting Kansas City. Overall, he had a strong debut season, scoring 11 goals and recording four assists in 30 appearances across all competitions. On 13 December, the Dynamo announced that they had acquired Elis on a full transfer from Monterrey.

Elis recorded two assists in the first game of the 2018 season, a 4–0 win over Atlanta United FC. He enjoyed a strong start to the season, scoring eight times and assisting five others in the first 12 matches and being named to the MLS Team of the Week four times during the stretch. On 29 June 2018, Elis was named in the team to play against Juventus in the 2018 MLS All-Star Game. He came on as a halftime substitute for Carlos Vela. On 3 July he picked up an assist in the 96th minute to help rescue a 2–2 draw with LAFC. Elis had two assists in the US Open Cup Final on 26 September as the Dynamo defeated the Philadelphia Union 3–0 to win their first ever US Open Cup. Elis finished the year with 21 combined goals and assists in MLS, a club single season record.

On 27 February 2019, Elis came on as a sub in the second leg of the Dynamo's CONCACAF Champions League tie with CD Guastatoya and assisted Mauro Manotas's goal that gave the Dynamo the lead on aggregate. On 16 March, Elis scored one and assisted on both of Memo Rodriguez's goals as the Dynamo beat Vancouver Whitecaps FC 3–2. His performance saw him named to the MLS Team of the Week. In Houston's next game, Elis helped the Dynamo get off to a fast start when he set up Memo Rodriguez for a goal in the 4th minute against the Colorado Rapids. He wasn't done terrorizing the defense however as he also scored one himself and hit two dangerous crosses that resulted in own goals, giving the Dynamo a 4–1 win over Colorado. Elis was again named to the MLS Team of the Week. In the Dynamo's next game, Elis stayed hot, scoring on a Manotas pass to give Elis a goal in his third straight game and to help the Dynamo get a 2–1 win over the San Jose Earthquakes. On 19 April, Elis converted a penalty to score in his 4th straight game, however the Dynamo would fall to the LA Galaxy 2–1. On 27 April, Elis helped the Dynamo continue their good start to the season when he stole the ball, ran down the right wing before sending in a low cross that Manotas put into the net in the 3rd minute. Houston would go onto defeat the Columbus Crew 2–0. On 4 May, Elis helped the Dynamo defeat rivals FC Dallas in a Texas Derby match, picking up an assist in root to a 2–1 win. He made four appearances in the Dynamo's next five games, picking up one goal and one assist, before leaving to join the Honduras national team for the 2019 Gold Cup. In his first game back with the Dynamo after the Gold Cup, Elis scored once and collected two assists in a 4–0 win over the New York Red Bulls. His performance saw him named to the MLS Team of the Week. On 17 July, Elis received a red card after getting in the face of a referee in the 6th minute of a match with Atlanta United. The Dynamo went on to lose the game 5–0. On top of the automatic one-game suspension, Elis was issued an additional one-game suspension by the league. Elis returned from his suspension in 1–0 loss to the Chicago Fire on 3 August, however he picked up a yellow card, meaning he was suspended for the Dynamo's next match due to yellow card accumulation. He struggled after he returned to the team, scoring once and collecting no assists in his next eight matches. Elis ended the season on a strong note, scoring once and assisting two others in a 4–2 win over the Galaxy in the final game of the season. He was named to the Team of the Week for the 4th time of the season.

Elis missed the first two games of the 2020 season due to a hamstring injury he suffered during preseason. The MLS season was paused after two games due to the COVID-19 pandemic. MLS returned to play in July with the MLS is Back Tournament. On 13 July, Elis made his season debut in Houston's first game of the tournament, a 3–3 draw against LAFC with Elis scoring once in the match. He scored again in Houston's next game, but was also sent off for two yellow cards as Houston lost 2–1 to the Portland Timbers. On 25 August Elis had a goal and an assist in a 5–2 win over Sporting Kansas City, but was also subbed off at halftime after hurting his back. He made two substitute appearances in the Dynamo's next two matches, recording two assists in a 3–0 win over Minnesota United FC and scoring once in a 2–1 over Kansas City. With transfer rumors surrounding Elis, the Dynamo held him out of their next three games. He was seen at the airport in Houston on 17 September and announced his goodbyes on social media two days later.

=== Boavista ===
On 21 September 2020, Elis moved to Portuguese Primeira Liga club Boavista. The terms of the transfer were undisclosed, but the fee was reportedly around $1 million plus a future sell-on percentage along with performance-based add-on incentives. Elis scored his first goal for the Portuguese outfit the following 2 November, the second goal in a 3–0 home win over Benfica. On 11 November, he recorded his first assist for the club, setting up Angel Gomes in the 3–1 loss to Farense. Elis would score a further four goals and record another four assists, with one of those goals coming against Porto in a 2–2 draw. On 1 May 2021, he scored a brace against Santa Clara in a 3–3 draw, with one being nominated as the Primeira Liga Goal of the Year. He finished the season with a total of 8 goals and six assists.

=== Bordeaux ===
On 25 August 2021, Elis joined Ligue 1 club Bordeaux on loan. He made his debut on 3 October in the 3–0 away defeat to Monaco, coming off the bench for Samuel Kalu in the 55th minute. He scored his first goal the following 24 October in a 1–1 draw with Lorient. Elis would score once again the next 6 November in Bordeaux's 3–2 home loss to Paris Saint-Germain.

On 9 June 2022, Bordeaux announced that the option-to-buy in Elis's loan deal had been activated. During the 2021–22 season with the club, he scored nine goals and delivered one assist in twenty-one appearances.

==== Loan to Brest and return to Bordeaux ====
On 30 January 2023, Elis joined first division club Brest on loan until the end of the season, with an option to buy in favor of the French club.

After his loan to Brest ended, he returned to Girondins de Bordeaux. On 24 February 2024, during a Ligue 2 game against En Avant Guingamp, Elis suffered a serious head injury and was induced into coma during four days. The injury marked an end to his season, and the likelihood of Elis needing to retire from professional football was a possibility. In August 2024, Bordeaux went into bankruptcy and was relegated into National 2, losing professional status thus ending Elis’ contract with the club.

=== Return to football ===
On 16 January 2025, Elis returned to his boyhood club Olimpia after more than eight years of playing abroad, signing a one-year contract. He would make his return to football and second debut with Olimpia the following 26 January, in a 2–0 home victory against Juticalpa, coming off the bench in the 70th minute in the place of Yustin Arboleda. Elis would once again put himself on the scoresheet on 26 July, where he scored against Lobos UPNFM in a 2–0 win, his first goal in almost two years since scoring for Bordeaux against USL Dunkerque on 19 December 2023.

On 16 August 2025, Elis would return to Portugal, signing with second-tier side CS Marítimo. He made his debut for the side on 31 August, coming off the bench in a 2–0 away win against Farense. On 2 February 2026, his contract with Marítimo was terminated by mutual agreement.

On 1 June 2026, returned to Honduras once again to sign with Marathón.

== International career ==
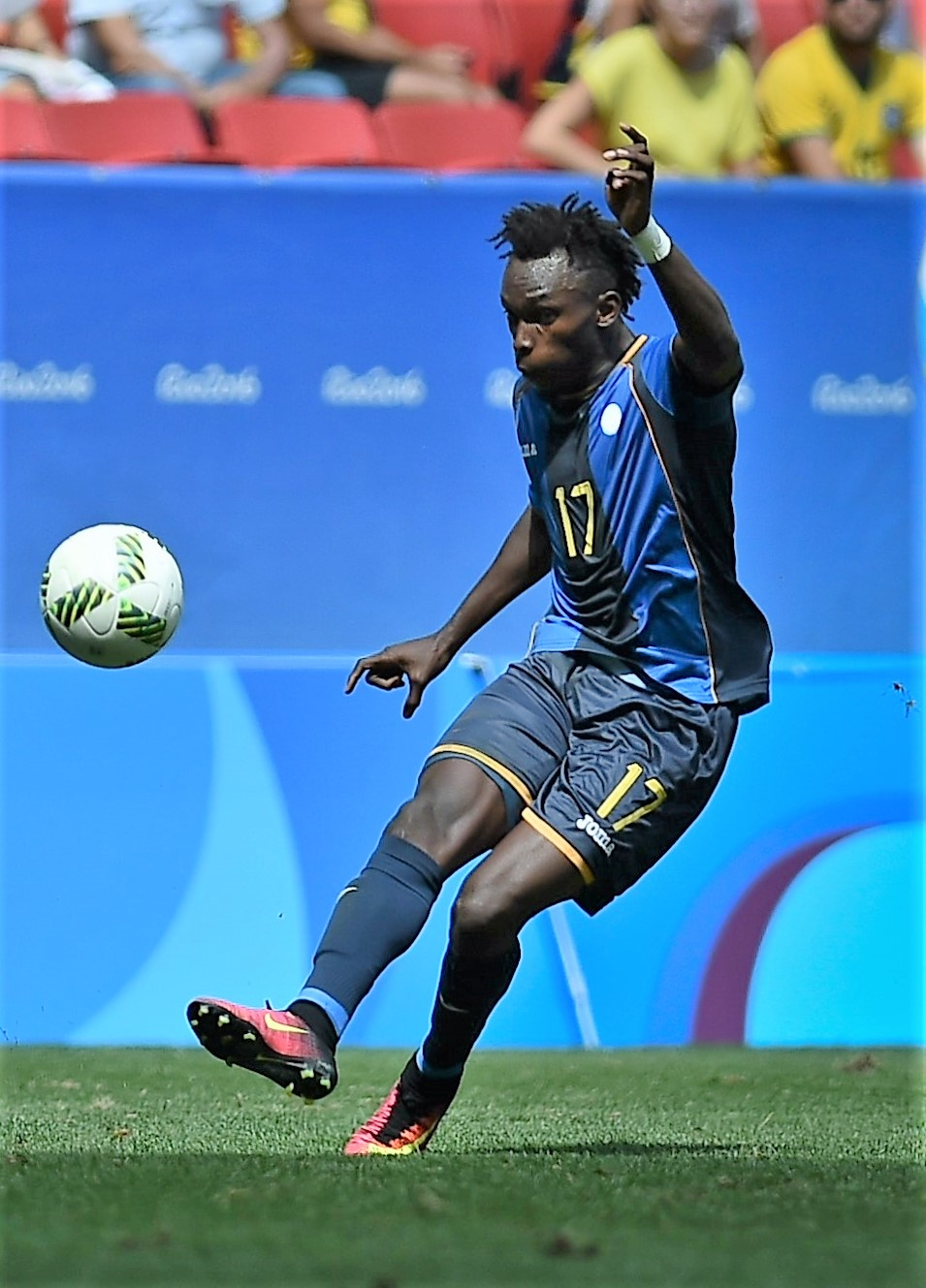
Elis playing for Honduras at the 2016 Summer Olympics

Elis first represented Honduras at the U-17 level in a 2013 CONCACAF U-17 Championship qualifying match on 7 December 2012, picking up a goal in a 5–2 win over El Salvador. In their next match, Elis scored a hat trick to help Honduras defeat Costa Rica 3–0. He finished as top scorer with four goals and help Honduras finish top of the Central American group. Elis featured in the 2013 CONCACAF U-17 Championship, where he scored once and helped Honduras finish 4th. At the 2013 FIFA U-17 World Cup Elis made four appearances and helped Honduras reach the quarter-finals.

On 30 September 2014, Elis was called up by head coach Hernán Medford to the Honduras national football team. He made his senior debut on 9 October 2014 in a friendly against Mexico, a 2–0 loss.

After making four senior appearances, Elis played on the Honduras U-21 team at the 2014 Central American and Caribbean Games, where he made 2 appearances as Honduras finished 4th. He was also part of the Honduras U-20 team that played at the 2015 CONCACAF U-20 Championship. Elis scored four goals in six games to help Honduras to a 3rd-place finish and qualify for the 2015 FIFA U-20 World Cup. At the U-20 World Cup, Elis appeared in all three group games, but was unable to help Honduras advance past the group stage. Elis led the Honduras U-23 team to a second-place finish at the 2015 CONCACAF Men's Olympic Qualifying Championship by scoring four goals in five games, including a brace in a 2–0 semifinals win over the United States. He was named to the Best XI of the tournament and finished as top scorer.

Elis returned to the senior national team in December 2015. He scored his scored his first and second international goals in a friendly match against Cuba on 16 December 2015. On 25 March 2016, Elis scored his first goal in a competitive senior match, scoring once in a 2–2 draw with El Salvador in a World Cup qualification match.

On 25 July 2016, Elis was named to the Honduras U-23 squad to play at the 2016 Olympics. He appeared all six of Honduras's games and scored two goals, including the winning goal in the quarterfinals match against South Korea, as he helped Honduras finish in 4th place.

On 29 June 2017, Elis was named to the 23 man squad for the 2017 Gold Cup. He made four appearances and helped Honduras reach the quarterfinals, where they fell 1–0 to Mexico.

On 6 June 2019, Fabián Coito named Elis to the 23 man squad for the 2019 Gold Cup. However, it was a disappointing tournament for Honduras and Elis, as he failed to score in his three appearances and Honduras finished last in their group.

On 6 June 2021, Elis scored in the third place match in the inaugural CONCACAF Nations League tournament. Elis scored what seemed to be the winner against Costa Rica in the 80th minute, but Francisco Calvo equalized for Los Ticos five minutes after. Honduras, however, defeated Costa Rica in a penalty shoot-out to secure a bronze medal.

== Personal life ==
Elis was born in San Juan Tela to Osman Elis and Yohani Martínez. He grew up in a rough and violent neighborhood of San Pedro Sula after the family moved to the city when Elis was young. His older brother, Osman Elis Martínez, is a professional footballer that last played for Honduras Progreso. His father was a professional footballer; a right midfielder, who played in the Honduran second division. Elis is of Garifuna heritage.

His nickname of "La Panterita", Spanish for the little panther, is in reference to a former Honduras striker David Suazo, who was known as "La Pantera" and also from San Pedro Sula. Elis is into fashion and owns over 100 pairs of shoes. Elis has done charity work for his home country, such as donating computers to his old school, donating shoes to kids, and repairing local parks.

== Career statistics ==
=== Club ===
As of 23 May 2026

Appearances and goals by club, season and competition
Club	Season	League			National cup (Note: Includes Honduran Cup, Copa MX, U.S. Open Cup, Taça de Portugal, and Coupe de France)		League cup (Note: Includes MLS Cup Playoffs)		Continental		Total	
Club	Season	Division	Apps	Goals	Apps	Goals	Apps	Goals	Apps	Goals	Apps	Goals
Olimpia	2013–14	Liga Nacional	9	0	—		—		—		9	0
Olimpia	2014–15	Liga Nacional	18	6	3	1	—		6 (Note: Appearances in CONCACAF Champions League)	1	27	8
Olimpia	2015–16	Liga Nacional	35	19	2	1	—		4	2	41	22
Olimpia	Total		62	25	5	2	—		10	3	77	30
Monterrey	2016–17	Liga MX	5	0	0	0	—		0	0	5	0
Houston Dynamo (loan)	2017	MLS	26	10	0	0	4	1	—		30	11
Houston Dynamo	2018	MLS	30	11	4	0	—		—		34	11
Houston Dynamo	2019	MLS	26	9	0	0	—		5 (Note: Four appearances in CONCACAF Champions League, one appearance in the Leagues Cup)	0	31	9
Houston Dynamo	2020	MLS	6	4	—		—		—		6	4
Houston Dynamo	Total		93	34	4	0	4	1	5	0	106	35
Boavista	2020–21	Primeira Liga	31	8	1	0	—		—		32	8
Bordeaux (loan)	2021–22	Ligue 1	20	9	1	0	—		—		21	9
Bordeaux	2022–23	Ligue 2	16	1	3	0	—		—		19	1
Brest (loan)	2022–23	Ligue 1	10	0	0	0	—		—		10	0
Bordeaux	2023–24	Ligue 2	19	5	2	0	—		—		21	5
Bordeaux	Total		96	23	7	0	—		—		103	23
Olimpia	2024–25	Liga Nacional	14	0	—		—		—		14	0
Olimpia	2025–26	Liga Nacional	3	3	—		—		1 (Note: Appearance in the CONCACAF Central American Cup)	0	4	3
Marítimo	2025–26	Liga Portugal 2	7	0	1	0	—		—		8	0
Career total			275	85	17	2	4	1	16	3	312	91

=== International ===
As of match played 29 June 2023

Appearances and goals by national team and year
National team	Year	Apps	Goals
Honduras	2014	4	0
Honduras	2015	1	2
Honduras	2016	10	1
Honduras	2017	13	4
Honduras	2018	3	0
Honduras	2019	11	3
Honduras	2020	0	0
Honduras	2021	11	2
Honduras	2022	3	0
Honduras	2023	4	1
Total		60	13

Scores and results list Honduras' goal tally first, score column indicates score after each Elis goal.

List of international goals scored by Alberth Elis
No.	Date	Venue	Opponent	Score	Result	Competition
1	16 December 2015	Estadio Juan Ramón Brevé Vargas, Juticalpa, Honduras	Cuba	1–0	2–0	Friendly
2	16 December 2015	Estadio Juan Ramón Brevé Vargas, Juticalpa, Honduras	Cuba	2–0	2–0	Friendly
3	25 March 2016	Estadio Cuscatlán, San Salvador, El Salvador	El Salvador	1–0	2–2	2018 FIFA World Cup qualification
4	13 June 2017	Estadio Rommel Fernández, Panama City, Panama	Panama	2–1	2–2	2018 FIFA World Cup qualification
5	1 September 2017	Ato Boldon Stadium, Couva, Trinidad and Tobago	Trinidad and Tobago	2–0	2–1	2018 FIFA World Cup qualification
6	10 October 2017	Estadio Olímpico Metropolitano, San Pedro Sula, Honduras	Mexico	1–1	3–2	2018 FIFA World Cup qualification
7	15 November 2017	Stadium Australia, Sydney, Australia	Australia	1–3	1–3	2018 FIFA World Cup qualification
8	10 September 2019	Estadio Olímpico Metropolitano, San Pedro Sula, Honduras	Chile	1–1	2–1	Friendly
9	17 November 2019	Estadio Olímpico Metropolitano, San Pedro Sula, Honduras	Trinidad and Tobago	3–0	4–0	2019–20 CONCACAF Nations League A
10	17 November 2019	Estadio Olímpico Metropolitano, San Pedro Sula, Honduras	Trinidad and Tobago	4–0	4–0	2019–20 CONCACAF Nations League A
11	6 June 2021	Empower Field at Mile High, Denver, United States	Costa Rica	2–1	2–2	2021 CONCACAF Nations League Finals
12	12 November 2021	Estadio Olímpico Metropolitano, San Pedro Sula, Honduras	Panama	1–0	2–3	2022 FIFA World Cup qualification
13	29 June 2023	State Farm Stadium, Glendale, United States	Qatar	1–1	1–1	2023 CONCACAF Gold Cup

== Honours ==
Olimpia

- Liga Nacional de Fútbol Profesional de Honduras: 2014 Clausura, 2015 Clausura, 2016 Clausura, 2025 Clausura
- President's Cup: 2015

Houston Dynamo

- U.S. Open Cup: 2018

Marítimo

- Liga Portugal 2: 2025–26

Honduras

- CONCACAF Nations League third place: 2021

Individual

- CONCACAF Champions League Best Young Player: 2015–16
- CONCACAF Best XI: 2017
- Dynamo Players' Player of the Year: 2017
- Houston Dynamo Newcomer of the Year: 2017
- MLS All-Star: 2018
- CONCACAF Nations League Finals Best XI: 2021
