= Juan Ramón Mejía =

Honduran footballer (born 1988)

Personal information
- Full name: Juan Ramón Mejía Erazo
- Date of birth: 1 August 1988 (age 38)
- Place of birth: Tegucigalpa, Honduras
- Height: 1.75 m (5 ft 9 in)
- Position: Forward

Team information
- Current team: UPNFM
- Number: 29

Senior career*
Years	Team	Apps	(Gls)
2009–2012	Deportes Savio		
2012–2013	Olimpia	25	(4)
2013–2016	Real España	63	(8)
2016–2017	Juticalpa	25	(3)
2017	Malacateco	14	(1)
2018–2020	Real de Minas	41	(28)
2020–2022	UPNFM	58	(16)
2023	Vida	24	(8)

International career
2019–2020	Honduras	4	(1)
- * Club domestic league appearances and goals as of 29 May 2021

Juan Ramón Mejía Erazo (born 1 August 1988) is a Honduran professional footballer who plays as a forward for and the Honduras national football team.

== International career ==
He debuted internationally on 14 November 2019, in the CONCACAF Nations League and scored his first goal for Honduras against non-FIFA member Martinique in a 1–1 draw.

== Career statistics ==
=== International ===
Appearances and goals by national team and year
National team	Year	Apps	Goals
Honduras	2019	2	1
Honduras	2020	2	0
Total		4	1

Scores and results list Honduras's goal tally first, score column indicates score after each Mejía goal.

List of international goals scored by Juan Ramón Mejía
No.	Date	Venue	Opponent	Score	Result	Competition
1	14 November 2019	Stade Pierre-Aliker, Fort-de-France, Martinique	Martinique	1–1	1–1	2019–20 CONCACAF Nations League A
