= Romario Barthéléry =

Martiniquais footballer (born 1994)

Personal information
- Full name: Romario Roland Barthéléry
- Date of birth: 24 June 1994 (age 32)
- Place of birth: Saint-Pierre, Martinique
- Position: Defender

Team information
- Current team: Golden Lion

Senior career*
Years	Team	Apps	(Gls)
2015–	Golden Lion		

International career^{‡}
2018–	Martinique	4	(0)
- * Club domestic league appearances and goals ‡ National team caps and goals as of 23 June 2019

Romario Roland Barthéléry (born 24 June 1994) is a French football player who represents Martinique internationally. He plays for Golden Lion.

== International ==
He made his Martinique national football team debut on 26 March 2018 in a friendly against Trinidad & Tobago.

He was selected for the 2019 CONCACAF Gold Cup squad.
