= Jonathan Toro =

Honduran footballer (born 1996)

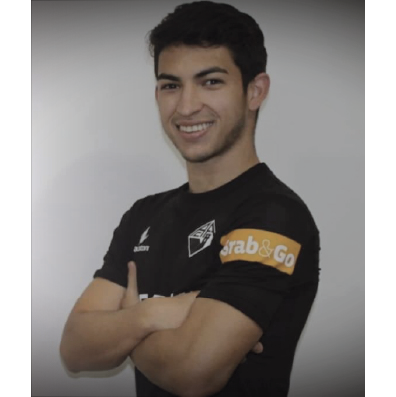
- Toro with Académica

Personal information
- Full name: Jonathan Josué Rubio Toro
- Date of birth: 21 October 1996 (age 30)
- Place of birth: San Pedro Sula, Honduras
- Height: 1.74 m (5 ft 8 1/2 in)
- Positions: Attacking midfielder; winger

Team information
- Current team: Petro de Luanda
- Number: 8

Youth career
- 2005–2012: Juventud Henerma
- 2012–2014: Fundación Marcet
- 2014: Sion
- 2015: Gil Vicente

Senior career*
Years	Team	Apps	(Gls)
2015–2018	Gil Vicente	56	(3)
2017	→ Arandina (loan)	8	(0)
2018–2020	Huesca	0	(0)
2018–2019	→ Varzim (loan)	17	(6)
2019	→ Académica (loan)	12	(2)
2019–2020	→ Tondela (loan)	32	(1)
2020–2021	Chaves	14	(1)
2021–2022	Santa Clara	0	(0)
2021–2022	→ Académica (loan)	29	(3)
2022–2023	Académico Viseu	28	(3)
2023–	Petro de Luanda	108	(20)

International career^{‡}
2019–	Honduras	20	(4)
- * Club domestic league appearances and goals as of 31 May 2026 ‡ National team caps and goals as of 13 November 2026

Jonathan Josué Rubio Toro (born 21 October 1996) is a Honduran professional footballer who plays as an attacking midfielder and winger for Girabola club Petro de Luanda.

== Club career ==
Born in San Pedro Sula, Toro joined FC Sion's youth setup in 2014, from Barcelona-based Fundación Marcet. On 22 January 2015 he joined Gil Vicente, being promoted to the first team in June.

Toro made his professional debut on 8 August 2015, coming on as a late substitute for Simeon Nwankwo in a 1–1 home draw against C.D. Mafra. On 28 January 2017, after appearing sparingly, he was loaned to Segunda División B side Arandina CF until June. Upon returning to Gil Vicente, Toro became a regular starter and scored his first professional goal on 28 October 2017, netting the opener in a 4–0 home routing of Benfica B. He finished the campaign with three goals in 37 appearances, but his side eventually suffered relegation.

On 9 July 2018, Toro signed for La Liga side SD Huesca, but was loaned to Varzim on 10 August. The following 30 January he was recalled by his parent club, and moved to Académica de Coimbra the following day, also in a temporary loan deal. On 19 July, he moved to first division side C.D. Tondela on a season long loan. He made his Primeira Liga debut in the opening fixture on 12 August, a 0–0 draw against Vitória He scored his first goal the following 15 September in a 4–2 win against Rio Ave and in August 2020, he was named Tondela's 2019–20 Player of the Season.

After terminating his contract with Huesca, Toro signed for LigaPro club G.D. Chaves on 7 October 2020. He made his debut on 1 December in a 2–1 away defeat to Casa Pia He scored his first goal the following 6 February, the second in a 3–1 away win against his former club Varzim.

On 7 July 2021, Toro joined first division club C.D. Santa Clara, but was immediately loaned once again to Académica de Coimbra in the second tier.

On 6 July 2022, Toro signed with another second division side, this time joining Académico de Viseu. A year later, in July 2023, Toro moved to Angolan Girabola club Petro de Luanda, signing a two-year deal.

== International career ==
Toro was included in the provisional squad for Honduras in the 2019 CONCACAF Gold Cup, but was dropped from the final squad.

Toro made his international debut on 5 September 2019, in a friendly against Puerto Rico, scoring a goal and providing two assists in a 4–0 win.

=== International goals ===
Scores and results list Honduras's goal tally first.

No.	Date	Venue	Opponent	Score	Result	Competition
1.	5 September 2019	Estadio Tiburcio Carías Andino, Tegucigalpa, Honduras	Puerto Rico	3–0	4–0	Friendly
2.	10 September 2019	Estadio Olímpico Metropolitano, San Pedro Sula, Honduras	Chile	2–1	2–1	Friendly
3.	17 November 2019	Estadio Olímpico Metropolitano, San Pedro Sula, Honduras	Trinidad and Tobago	1–0	4–0	2019–20 CONCACAF Nations League A
4.	13 November 2026	Mohammed bin Zayed Stadium, Abu Dhabi, United Arab Emirates	United Arab Emirates	1–2	1–3	Friendly

== Honours ==
Petro de Luanda

- Girabola: 2023–24, 2024–25, 2025-26
- Taça de Angola: 2023–24
- Supertaça de Angola: 2023, 2024, 2025

Individual

- C.D. Tondela Player of the Year: 2019–20
