= John Pitti =

Panamanian football referee

- Full name: John Francis Pitti Hernández
- Born: August 2, 1978 (age 48); Chiriquí, Panama

Domestic
Years	League	Role

International
Years	League	Role
2012–2021	FIFA listed	Referee

John Francis Pitti Hernández (born 2 August 1978) is a retired Panamanian professional football referee. He was appointed an international referee for FIFA in 2012. He refereed some matches in the CONCACAF Champions League.

On 6 June 2021, Pitti refereed the final of the inaugural edition of the CONCACAF Nations League.
