= Mexico at the CONCACAF Nations League =

International foodball competition

The CONCACAF Nations League is an international football competition contested by the senior men's national teams of the member associations of CONCACAF, the regional governing body of North America, Central America, and the Caribbean. The tournament takes place on dates allocated for international friendlies on the FIFA International Match Calendar. A one-time qualifying tournament took place from September 2018 to March 2019 and the inaugural tournament began in September 2019. The teams are divided into three leagues of four groups, from League A to League C. The winners of each group from League A get to play the Finals, constituted of the semi-finals, a third-place play-off, and the final.

== Overall record ==
CONCACAF Nations League record
| Season | Division | Group | Pld | W | D* | L | GF | GA | P/R | RK | Squad |
|---|---|---|---|---|---|---|---|---|---|---|---|
| (United States) 2019−20 | A | B | 6 | 4 | 1 | 1 | 15 | 6 | Same position | 2nd | Squad |
| (United States) 2022–23 | A | A | 6 | 3 | 2 | 1 | 9 | 6 | Same position | 3rd | Squad |
| (United States) 2023–24 | A | Bye | 4 | 2 | 0 | 2 | 5 | 4 | Same position | 2nd | Squad |
| (United States) 2024–25 | A | Bye | 4 | 3 | 0 | 1 | 8 | 3 | Same position | 1st | Squad |
| (United States) 2026–27 | A | Bye | To be determined | | | | | | | | |
| Total | | | 20 | 12 | 3 | 5 | 37 | 19 | 1st | | — |

*Draws include knockout matches decided via penalty shoot-out.
**Group stage played home and away. Flag shown represents host nation for the finals stage. Red border colour indicates the finals stage will be held on home soil.

== List of matches ==
All-time matches at the CONCACAF Nations League
| Season | Round | Opponent | Score | Result | Venue | City | Mexico scorers |
|---|---|---|---|---|---|---|---|
| (United States) 2019–20 | Group B | | | | | | |
| (United States) 2019–20 | Group B | Bermuda | 5–1 | W | National Stadium | Devonshire Parish | Antuna, Macías (2), Lozano, Herrera |
| (United States) 2019–20 | Group B | Panama | 3–1 | W | Azteca | Mexico City | Alvarado, Macías, Pizarro |
| (United States) 2019–20 | Group B | Panama | 3–0 | W | Rommel Fernández | Panama City | Jiménez (2), Álvarez |
| (United States) 2019–20 | Group B | Bermuda | 2–1 | W | Nemesio Díez | Toluca | Córdova, Antuna |
| (United States) 2019–20 | Semi-finals | Costa Rica | 0–0 (5–4 p) | D | Empower Field at Mile High | Denver | — |
| (United States) 2019–20 | Final | United States | 2–3 (a.e.t.) | L | Empower Field at Mile High | Denver | Corona, Lainez |
| (United States) 2022–23 | Group A | | | | | | |
| (United States) 2022–23 | Group A | Suriname | 3–0 | W | Corona | Torreón | Reyes, Martín, E. Sánchez |
| (United States) 2022–23 | Group A | Jamaica | 1–1 | D | National Stadium | Kingston | Romo |
| (United States) 2022–23 | Group A | Suriname | 2–0 | W | Frank Essed Stadion | Paramaribo | Vásquez |
| (United States) 2022–23 | Group A | Jamaica | 2–2 | D | Azteca | Mexico City | Pineda, Lozano |
| (United States) 2022–23 | Semi-finals | United States | 0–3 | L | Allegiant Stadium | Paradise | — |
| (United States) 2022–23 | Third place play-off | Panama | 1–0 | W | Allegiant Stadium | Paradise | Gallardo |
| (United States) 2023–24 | Quarter-finals | | | | | | |
| (United States) 2023–24 | Quarter-finals | Honduras | 0–2 | L | Nacional Chelato Uclés | Tegucigalpa | — |
| (United States) 2023–24 | Quarter-finals | Honduras | 2–0 (a.e.t.) (4–2 p) | W | Azteca | Mexico City | Chávez, Álvarez |
| (United States) 2023–24 | Semi-finals | Panama | 3–0 | W | AT&T Stadium | Arlington | Álvarez, Quiñones, Pineda |
| (United States) 2023–24 | Final | United States | 0–2 | L | AT&T Stadium | Arlington | — |
| (United States) 2024–25 | Quarter-finals | | | | | | |
| (United States) 2024–25 | Quarter-finals | Honduras | 0–2 | L | Estadio Francisco Morazán | San Pedro Sula | — |
| (United States) 2024–25 | Quarter-finals | Honduras | 4–0 | W | Nemesio Díez | Toluca | Jiménez, Martín (2), J. Sánchez |
| (United States) 2024–25 | Semi-finals | Canada | 2–0 | W | SoFi Stadium | Inglewood | Jiménez (2) |
| (United States) 2024–25 | Final | Panama | 2–1 | W | SoFi Stadium | Inglewood | Jiménez (2) |

== 2019–20 CONCACAF Nations League ==
=== Group stage ===
| Pos | Team | Pld | W | D | L | GF | GA | GD | Pts | Qualification or relegation | (Mexico) | (Panama) | (Bermuda) |
|---|---|---|---|---|---|---|---|---|---|---|---|---|---|
| 1 | Mexico | 4 | 4 | 0 | 0 | 13 | 3 | +10 | 12 | Qualification for Finals and Gold Cup | — | 3–1 | 2–1 |
| 2 | Panama | 4 | 1 | 0 | 3 | 5 | 9 | −4 | 3 | Qualification for Gold Cup | 0–3 | — | 0–2 |
| 3 | Bermuda (R) | 4 | 1 | 0 | 3 | 5 | 11 | −6 | 3 | Gold Cup prelims and League B | 1–5 | 1–4 | — |

Source: CONCACAF
Rules for classification: Tiebreakers
(R) Relegated
11 October 2019
21:00 (22:00 UTC−3)

| Bermuda | 1–5 | Mexico |
|---|---|---|
| Wells 56' | Report | Antuna 25'; Macías 45+2', 53'; Lozano 60'; Herrera 71' |

Bermuda National Stadium, Hamilton
Attendance: 705
Referee: Henry Bejarano (Costa Rica)

15 October 2019
21:30 (20:30 UTC−5)

| Mexico | 3–1 | Panama |
|---|---|---|
| Alvarado 28'; Macías 75'; Pizarro 90+2' | Report | Salcedo 42' (o.g.) |

Estadio Azteca, Mexico City
Attendance: 41,075
Referee: Iván Barton (El Salvador)

15 November 2019
21:00

| Panama | 0–3 | Mexico |
|---|---|---|
| | Report | Jiménez 8', 85' (pen.); Álvarez 70' |

Estadio Rommel Fernández, Panama City
Attendance: 16,407
Referee: Ricardo Montero (Costa Rica)

19 November 2019
21:30 (20:30 UTC−6)

| Mexico | 2–1 | Bermuda |
|---|---|---|
| Córdova 27'; Antuna 90+3' | Report | Leverock 10' |

Estadio Nemesio Díez, Toluca
Referee: Ismael Cornejo (El Salvador)

=== Final tournament ===
Semi-finals

3 June 2021
20:00 (Note: Though listed with a 20:00 kick-off time, the match began at 20:36.)

| Mexico | 0–0 (a.e.t.) | Costa Rica |
|---|---|---|
| | Report |
Penalties
| Antuna (penalty missed); Lozano (penalty scored); Pineda (penalty scored); Pulido (penalty scored); Romo (penalty scored); Gallardo (penalty scored) | 5–4 | (penalty scored) Venegas; (penalty missed) Duarte; (penalty scored) Alfaro; (penalty scored) Lassiter; (penalty scored) Calvo; (penalty missed) Cruz |

Empower Field at Mile High, Denver
Attendance: 34,451
Referee: Bryan López (Guatemala)

Final

6 June 2021
19:00 (Note: Though listed with a 19:00 kick-off time, the match actually began at 19:36.)

| United States | 3–2 (a.e.t.) | Mexico |
|---|---|---|
| Reyna 27'; McKennie 82'; Pulisic 114' (pen.) | Report | Corona 2'; Lainez 79' |

Empower Field at Mile High, Denver
Attendance: 37,648
Referee: John Pitti (Panama)

== 2022–23 CONCACAF Nations League ==
=== Group stage ===
| Pos | Team | Pld | W | D | L | GF | GA | GD | Pts | Qualification | (Mexico) | (Jamaica) | (Suriname) |
|---|---|---|---|---|---|---|---|---|---|---|---|---|---|
| 1 | Mexico | 4 | 2 | 2 | 0 | 8 | 3 | +5 | 8 | Qualification for Finals and Gold Cup | — | 2–2 | 3–0 |
| 2 | Jamaica | 4 | 1 | 3 | 0 | 7 | 5 | +2 | 6 | Qualification for Gold Cup | 1–1 | — | 3–1 |
| 3 | Suriname | 4 | 0 | 1 | 3 | 2 | 9 | −7 | 1 | Advance to Gold Cup prelims | 0–2 | 1–1 | — |

Source: CONCACAF
Rules for classification: Tiebreakers
11 June 2022
22:00 (21:00 UTC−5)

| Mexico | 3–0 | Suriname |
|---|---|---|
| Reyes 4'; Martín 40' (pen.); Sánchez 90+4' | Report |

Estadio Corona, Torreón
Referee: Iván Barton (El Salvador)

14 June 2022
20:00 (19:00 UTC−5)

| Jamaica | 1–1 | Mexico |
|---|---|---|
| Bailey 4' | Report | Romo 45+3' |

Independence Park, Kingston
Referee: Bryan López (Guatemala)

23 March 2023

| Suriname | 0–2 | Mexico |
|---|---|---|
| | Report | Vásquez 64'; Dankerlui 82' (o.g.) |

Frank Essed Stadion, Paramaribo
Referee: Said Martínez (Honduras)

26 March 2023

| Mexico | 2–2 | Jamaica |
|---|---|---|
| Pineda 17'; Lozano 45+2' (pen.) | Report | De Cordova-Reid 8'; Álvarez 33' (o.g.) |

Estadio Azteca, Mexico City
Referee: Ismail Elfath (United States)

=== Final tournament ===
Semi-finals

15 June 2023
19:00

| United States | 3–0 | Mexico |
|---|---|---|
| Pulisic 37', 46'; Pepi 79' | Report |

Allegiant Stadium, Paradise
Attendance: 65,000
Referee: Iván Barton (El Salvador)

Third place play-off

18 June 2023
15:00

| Panama | 0–1 | Mexico |
|---|---|---|
| | Report | Gallardo 4' |

Allegiant Stadium, Paradise
Attendance: 35,000
Referee: Daneon Parchment (Jamaica)

== 2023–24 CONCACAF Nations League ==
=== Quarter-finals ===
17 November 2023
21:00 (20:00 UTC−6)

| Honduras | 2–0 | Mexico |
|---|---|---|
| Lozano 30'; Róchez 72' | Report |

Estadio Nacional Chelato Uclés, Tegucigalpa
Attendance: 22,444
Referee: Juan Gabriel Calderón (Costa Rica)
21 November 2023
21:30 (20:30 UTC−6)

| Mexico | 2–0 (a.e.t.) | Honduras |
|---|---|---|
| Chávez 43'; Álvarez 90+11' | Report |
Penalties
| Giménez (penalty scored); Vásquez (penalty scored); Pineda (penalty scored); Huerta (penalty scored) | 4–2 | (penalty missed) Róchez; (penalty scored) Acosta; (penalty scored) Elis; (penalty missed) Najar |

Estadio Azteca, Mexico City
Referee: Iván Barton (El Salvador)

2–2 on aggregate. Mexico won 4–2 on penalties.

=== Final tournament ===
Semi-finals

21 March 2024
22:15 (21:15 UTC−5)

| Panama | 0–3 | Mexico |
|---|---|---|
| | Report | Álvarez 40'; Quiñones 43'; Pineda 67' |

AT&T Stadium, Arlington
Attendance: 40,926
Referee: Walter López (Guatemala)

Final

24 March 2024
21:15 (20:15 UTC−5)

| Mexico | 0–2 | United States |
|---|---|---|
| | Report | Adams 45'; Reyna 63' |

AT&T Stadium, Arlington
Attendance: 59,471
Referee: Drew Fischer (Canada)

== 2024–25 CONCACAF Nations League ==
=== Quarter-finals ===
15 November 2024
21:00 (20:00 UTC−6)

| Honduras | 2–0 | Mexico |
|---|---|---|
| Palma 64', 83' | Report |

Estadio Francisco Morazán, San Pedro Sula
Attendance: 12,866
Referee: Walter López (Guatemala)
19 November 2024
21:30 (20:30 UTC−6)

| Mexico | 4–0 | Honduras |
|---|---|---|
| Jiménez 42'; Martín 72', 90+7' (pen.); J. Sánchez 85' | Report |

Estadio Nemesio Díez, Toluca
Attendance: 26,898
Referee: Drew Fischer (Canada)

Mexico won 4–2 on aggregate.

=== Final tournament ===
Semi-finals

20 March 2025
22:30 (19:30 UTC−7)

| Canada | 0–2 | Mexico |
|---|---|---|
| | Report | Jiménez 1', 75' |

SoFi Stadium, Inglewood
Attendance: 50,295
Referee: Saíd Martínez (Honduras)

Final

23 March 2025
21:30 (18:30 UTC−7)

| Mexico | 2–1 | Panama |
|---|---|---|
| Jiménez 8', 90+2' (pen.) | Report | Carrasquilla 45+2' (pen.) |

SoFi Stadium, Inglewood
Attendance: 68,212
Referee: Mario Escobar (Guatemala)

== Goalscorers ==
| Player | Goals | 2019–20 | 2022–23 | 2023–24 | 2024–25 |
|---|---|---|---|---|---|
| Raúl Jiménez | 6 | 1 | | | 5 |
| Edson Álvarez | 3 | 1 | | 2 | |
| José Juan Macías | 3 | 3 | | | |
| Henry Martín | 3 | | 1 | | 2 |
| Uriel Antuna | 2 | 2 | | | |
| Hirving Lozano | 2 | 1 | 1 | | |
| Orbelín Pineda | 2 | | 1 | 1 | |
| Roberto Alvarado | 1 | 1 | | | |
| Luis Chávez | 1 | | | 1 | |
| Sebastián Córdova | 1 | 1 | | | |
| Jesús Gallardo | 1 | | 1 | | |
| Héctor Herrera | 1 | 1 | | | |
| Rodolfo Pizarro | 1 | 1 | | | |
| Julián Quiñones | 1 | | | 1 | |
| Israel Reyes | 1 | | 1 | | |
| Luis Romo | 1 | | 1 | | |
| Érick Sánchez | 1 | | 1 | | |
| Jorge Sánchez | 1 | | | | 1 |
| Johan Vásquez | 1 | | 1 | | |
| Total | 37 | 12 | 8 | 5 | 8 |

Bold players are still active for the national team.
