= Mexico–United States soccer rivalry =

Sports rivalry between the national soccer teams of Mexico and the United States

Mexico-United States soccer rivalry
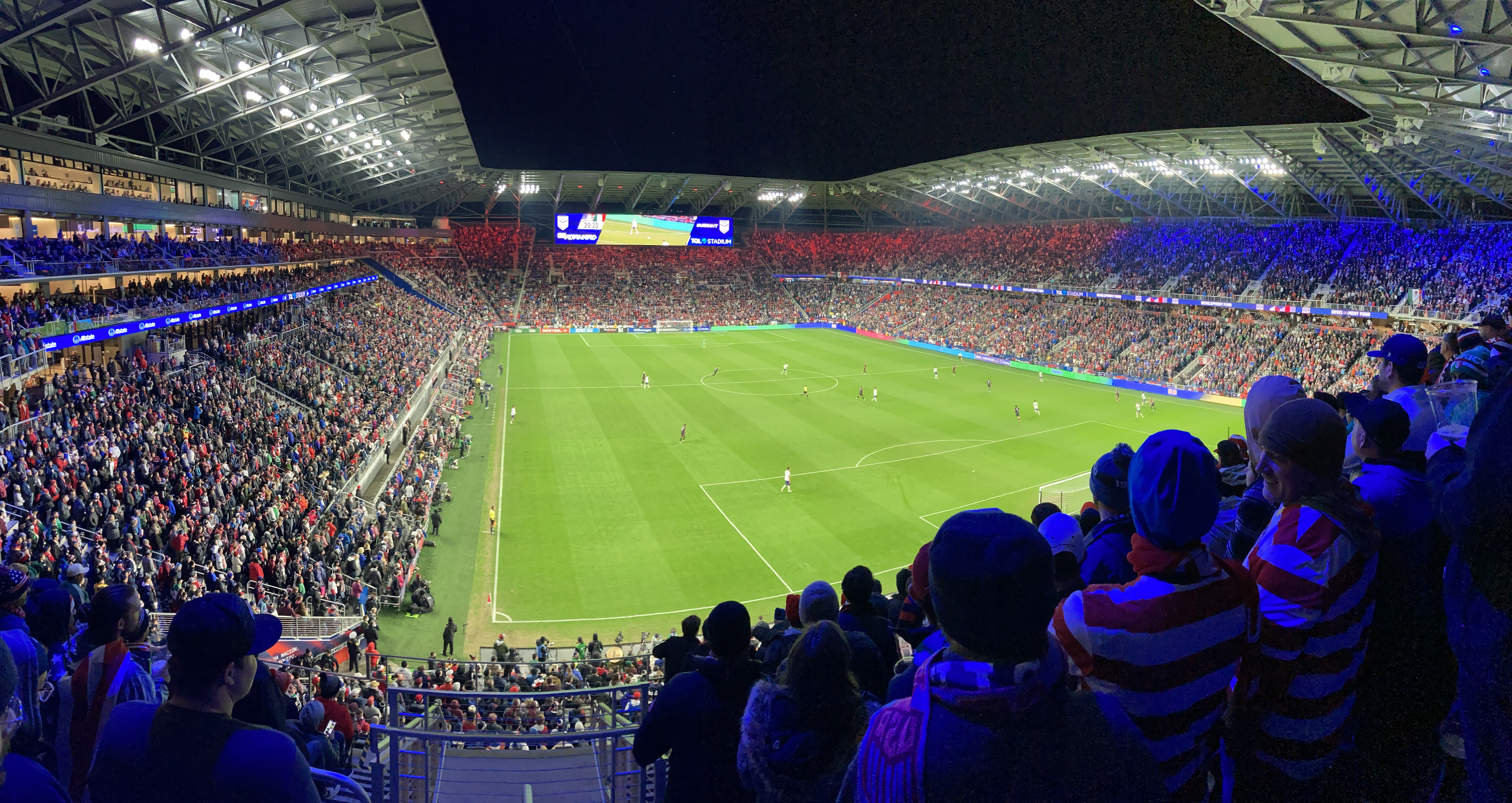
- United States vs. Mexico during the 2022 FIFA World Cup qualification.
- Teams: Mexico; United States
- First meeting: May 24, 1934; FIFA World Cup qualification United States 4–2 Mexico
- Latest meeting: October 3, 2026; Friendly; United States 3–0 Mexico
- Next meeting: March 25, 2027; 2027 CONCACAF Nations League Finals Semifinals

Statistics
- Total meetings: 80
- All-time series: Mexico, 38–17–25
- Largest victory: Mexico 7–2 United States; FIFA World Cup qualification (April 28, 1957)
- Longest unbeaten streak: 21 matches Mexico (1937–1980)
- Current unbeaten streak: 1 match United States (2026–present)

The Mexico–United States soccer rivalry is a sports rivalry primarily between the men's national association football teams of the two countries, widely considered the two major powers of CONCACAF. The men's rivalry is regarded as one of the greatest rivalries in the international sport for its controversial incidents involving players, fans, team brawls, and competitiveness, which is amplified by political issues surrounding Mexico–U.S. relations.

The first matchup was played in 1934, though the rivalry did not properly emerge until the 1990s, when soccer in the United States rapidly developed into a major CONCACAF power to rival Mexico's longstanding dominance of North America. Modern matches between the two nations often attract much national media attention, public interest, and comment in both countries. The U.S.-Mexico matchups are widely attended, with most modern games being at stadium capacity. Several matches at the Estadio Azteca in Mexico have drawn over 100,000 fans, and several matches at the Rose Bowl in the United States have drawn over 90,000 fans.

At the FIFA World Cup, the nations have met only once in 2002, where the United States eliminated Mexico in the round of 16. Outside the World Cup, the most important games take place in quadrennial FIFA World Cup qualifiers and major North American tournaments such as the CONCACAF Gold Cup; where Mexico leads final matchups with 6, and the CONCACAF Nations League; where the United States leads final matchups with 2. The rivalry also plays out with occasional friendly exhibition games, which media outlets often consider "anything but friendly". Overall, the teams have met 80 times, with Mexico leading the rivalry 38–17–25 (W–D–L).

A lighter rivalry exists between the women's national teams, with the U.S. dominating 41–1–2 (W-D-L).

== History ==
=== 1930s: Origins ===
The first match between the two sides was a qualifying match in Italy for the final spot in the 1934 FIFA World Cup. The United States had established a professional league in 1921, but it folded in 1933. The final score was United States 4–2 Mexico. In September 1937, Mexico began a winning streak over the U.S. in friendlies, 7–2, 7–3, and 5–1 in Mexico City.

=== 1940s–1980s: Mexico dominance ===
Following that initial victory by the U.S. in 1934, Mexico went unbeaten in the next 24 games between the two nations, with 21 wins and three draws. The U.S. would not record its second victory over its southern neighbor until 46 years later in 1980, when they won a 1982 World Cup qualifier 2–1 in Fort Lauderdale, Florida. Overall, the first 50 years of the rivalry concluded with Mexico holding a commanding lead in the series, 22 wins to the United States' two, with three draws.

=== 1990s: Rivalry emerges and Mexico foothold ===
With the rapid development of soccer in the United States, the U.S. qualified for the World Cup in 1990 for the first time since 1950 and fourth time overall, thanks in part to the Cachirules scandal which caused Mexico to be banned from the qualification tournament. This decade saw the U.S. begin to field more competitive sides, challenging the dominance of Mexico for the first time since 1934. However, despite a few notable U.S. victories, such as a 2–0 triumph in the inaugural edition of the CONCACAF Gold Cup in 1991, and a 4–1 win on penalties following a 0–0 draw in the quarterfinals of the 1995 Copa America, Mexico still got the better of the U.S. in the '90s, with five wins to three, alongside six draws.

=== 2000s–2014: "Dos a cero" and Landon Donovan era ===
The first decade of the new millennium saw the United States turn the tides of the rivalry. In 2001, the U.S. and Mexico faced off in a 2002 World Cup qualifier at Columbus Crew Stadium, which saw the U.S. defeat their archrivals 2–0, Landon Donovan scoring a goal and providing an assist for the other in his senior team debut. The match, dubbed La Guerra Fria ("The Cold War") by Mexican media due to the sub-freezing conditions that night, was called "Dos a cero" (two to zero) by American press, creating a tagline for future matches that finished with a similar scoreline. The following year, the two nations would face off in the FIFA World Cup itself for the first, and so far only, time in their history in the round of 16 in the 2002 FIFA World Cup. Goals from Brian McBride and Landon Donovan eliminated Mexico to give the U.S. another 2–0 "Dos a cero" victory, to date the most important and famous matchup of the rivalry.

Led by Donovan, the United States would continue their dominance throughout the rest of the decade and into the first half of the next, with three more 2–0 victories in home World Cup qualifiers at Crew Stadium. The penchant for the U.S. to defeat Mexico by that particular score line led to U.S. fans taunting their rivals by chanting dos a cero ("two to zero"). Over the decade, various off-field incidents also happened that further hardened the rivalry, such as Donovan urinating on a Mexican training pitch and Mexican fans shouting "Osama" to the American players in reference to 9/11. Also within this time frame, the U.S. would defeat Mexico 2–1 in the 2007 Gold Cup final. Mexico would return the favor in the following final in 2009 with a 5–0 victory, albeit against a U.S. side which was not fielding its best players due to them playing at the 2009 FIFA Confederations Cup, but would repeat the feat 2 years later with a 4–2 comeback victory against a full-strength U.S. team. The following year, the U.S. would defeat Mexico at the Estadio Azteca for the first time, winning a friendly match 1–0, and then during 2014 World Cup qualifying, the United States earned their second ever point in the Azteca by way of a 0–0 draw.

A low point in the rivalry for Mexico came in 2013, when, in the final match day of World Cup qualifying, Mexico found themselves on the brink of elimination. With El Tri trailing in their match against Costa Rica and Panama holding a 2–1 lead over the United States, Mexico had found themselves in 5th place and were minutes away from failing to qualify for the World Cup. However, in stoppage time, an equalizing goal from American Graham Zusi saved Mexico, vaulting them past Panama and into 4th place in the table, ensuring their qualification to the intercontinental playoff, where they would defeat New Zealand to qualify for the World Cup. The goal caused the Mexican commentator for TV Azteca to exclaim "God Bless America!" in English, and led to Zusi being dubbed San Zusi ("Saint Zusi") by Mexico fans. Landon Donovan retired after controversially not being picked for the 2014 FIFA World Cup.

Ultimately, from 2000 to 2014, the United States was dominant, with 12 wins to Mexico's five, together with five draws.

=== 2015–2019: Mexico back on top ===
Following the 2014 World Cup and the retirement of Donovan, Mexico regained its footing in the rivalry, starting with a 3–2 extra time victory in the 2015 CONCACAF Cup. In 2018 World Cup qualifying, Mexico finally broke the Dos A Cero streak with a 2–1 win, their first triumph over the U.S. in Crew Stadium. Ultimately, the second half of the 2010s would mark the lowest point of the rivalry for the United States since the 1990s, as they would fail to qualify for the 2018 World Cup. Then, the following year, Mexico would defeat the United States 1–0 in the 2019 Gold Cup Final, then humiliate the Americans 3–0 in their own home in a September friendly, which was Mexico's most lopsided victory over their rivals since 2009.

Overall, the second half of the 2010s saw Mexico win four times and the United States win two times, along with one draw.

=== 2021–present: Christian Pulisic era ===
Following the United States' failure to qualify for the 2018 World Cup and the two 2019 defeats, the U.S. revamped their lineup, fielding a roster composed of younger players competing in top European leagues. This saw the tide turn once again in their favor, starting in 2021 with the inaugural CONCACAF Nations League final, one of the most thrilling matches in the rivalry's history, which the U.S. won 3–2 after extra time after a late penalty goal from Christian Pulisic. Then, 2 months later in the Gold Cup final, the US, despite fielding a weaker roster compared to Mexico, who brought most of their first choice players, once again defeated their archrivals in extra time, this time by a 1–0 score line. Finally, in November, the U.S. defeated Mexico yet again in a 2022 World Cup qualifier at TQL Stadium in Cincinnati by the infamous Dos A Cero score. During the match, opening goalscorer Pulisic taunted the Mexican team by lifting his jersey, exposing a shirt with "Man in the Mirror" written on it. This was in response to Guillermo Ochoa's pre-game comments in which he said that "Mexico is the mirror in which the United States wants to see itself". The win marked the first 3-game winning streak by the U.S. over Mexico in their history.

At the 2023 CONCACAF Nations League Finals, the United States eliminated Mexico in a resounding 3–0 victory following a brace by Pulisic at Allegiant Stadium in Las Vegas. The game had a combined four red cards and 10 yellow cards for violent behavior, including Weston McKennie having his shirt ripped off by Mexican players. The match was called eight minutes into what was supposed to be 12 minutes of stoppage time amid a homophobic chanting by Mexican fans. CONCACAF officially said the match was ended at the referee's discretion. In the following year in the 2024 CONCACAF Nations League final, the U.S. defeated Mexico 2–0 to clinch the title again, and achieved a Nations League three-peat.

On October 15, 2024, Mexico finally put an end to their losing streak and defeated the U.S. 2–0 in a friendly at Estadio Akron, albeit with both teams fielding a roster without nearly all of their regular starters. On July 6, 2025, at the CONCACAF Gold Cup final, Mexico came back to defeat the U.S. 2–1 in a competitive match for the first time since 2019, though with the U.S. tournament squad lacking all but 3 of their regular players. The U.S. beat Mexico 3–0 in a October 2026 friendly at State Farm Stadium, where Cavan Sullivan became the youngest American goalscorer in history.

As of October 2026, the U.S. leads Mexico with six wins to Mexico's two from 2021, along with two draws.

== Comparison in major tournaments ==
Key

Denotes which team finished better in that particular competition.
DNQ: Did not qualify.
DNP: Did not participate.
TBD: To be determined.

== Results ==
=== Summary ===
Mexico leads the series overall 38–17–25, with 149 goals for Mexico and 96 for the United States. In the 21st century the U.S. leads the series 20–8–11, with 54 goals opposed to Mexico's 37.

Years	Matches	For Mexico	Draw	For the U.S.	Goals
**All time**	**80**	**38**	**17**	**25**	**Mexico 149**–96 United States
1930s–1940s	7	6	0	1	**Mexico 38**–12 United States
1950s–1960s	8	6	2	0	**Mexico 30**–8 United States
1970s–1980s	12	**10**	1	1	**Mexico 27**–7 United States
1990s	14	5	**6**	3	**Mexico 17**–15 United States
2000s	**16**	4	2	**10**	Mexico 13–**23 United States**
2010s	13	5	4	4	**Mexico 17**–15 United States
2020s	10	2	2	6	Mexico 7–**16 United States**

Major titles	Mexico	United States
FIFA Confederations Cup*	**1**	0
CONCACAF Gold Cup	**10**	7
CONCACAF Nations League	1	**3**
CONCACAF Championship*	**3**	0
CONCACAF Cup*	**1**	0

*defunct

=== FIFA World Cup ===
FIFA World Cup
Tournament	Winner	Final score	Loser
2002	**United States**	**2–0**	Mexico

=== Gold Cup ===
The United States and Mexico have met in eight Gold Cup finals to date, with Mexico holding a six games to two lead over the United States.

CONCACAF Gold Cup finals
Tournament	Winner	Final score	Loser
1993	Mexico	4–0	United States
1998	Mexico	1–0	United States
2007	United States	2–1	Mexico
2009	Mexico	5–0	United States
2011	Mexico	4–2	United States
2019	Mexico	1–0	United States
2021	United States	1–0 (a.e.t.)	Mexico
2025	Mexico	2–1	United States

=== CONCACAF Nations League ===
The United States and Mexico have met in two Nations League finals to date, with the U.S. winning both matchups.

CONCACAF Nations League finals
Tournament	Winner	Final score	Loser
2021	**United States**	**3–2 (a.e.t.)**	Mexico
2024	**United States**	**2–0**	Mexico

=== CONCACAF Cup ===
CONCACAF Cup
Tournament	Winner	Final score	Loser
2015	**Mexico**	**3–2 (a.e.t.)**	United States

=== List of matches ===
Matches marked in bold are final matches played for a title.

Mexico win
United States win
(Ties)

Date	Venue and city	Competition	Winner	Score	Att.	Series (W–D–L)
May 24, 1934	Stadio Nazionale, Rome, Italy	1934 FIFA World Cup qualifier	USA	4–2	10,000	1–0 USA
September 12, 1937	Parque Asturias, Mexico City, D.F.	Friendly	MEX	7–2	21,000	1–0–1
September 19, 1937	Parque Necaxa, Mexico City, D.F.	Friendly	MEX	7–3	22,000	2–0–1 MEX
September 26, 1937	Parque Necaxa, Mexico City, D.F.	Friendly	MEX	5–1		3–0–1 MEX
July 13, 1947	Estadio Tropical, Havana, Cuba	1947 NAFC Championship	MEX	5–0	5,400	4–0–1 MEX
September 4, 1949	Estadio de los Deportes, Mexico City, D.F.	1949 NAFC Championship (Note: Matches were also qualifiers for the 1950 World Cup.)	MEX	6–0	60,000	5–0–1 MEX
September 18, 1949	Estadio de los Deportes, Mexico City, D.F.	1949 NAFC Championship	MEX	6–2	54,500	6–0–1 MEX
January 10, 1954	Estadio de los Deportes, Mexico City, D.F.	1954 FIFA World Cup qualifier	MEX	4–0	60,000	7–0–1 MEX
January 14, 1954	Estadio de los Deportes, Mexico City, D.F.	1954 FIFA World Cup qualifier	MEX	3–1	40,000	8–0–1 MEX
April 7, 1957	Estadio Olímpico Universitario, Mexico City, D.F.	1958 FIFA World Cup qualifier	MEX	6–0	75,000	9–0–1 MEX
April 28, 1957	Veterans Memorial Stadium, Long Beach, California	1958 FIFA World Cup qualifier	MEX	7–2	12,500	10–0–1 MEX
November 3, 1960	Wrigley Field, Los Angeles, California	1962 FIFA World Cup qualifier	Draw	3–3	8,000	10–1–1 MEX
November 6, 1960	Estadio Olímpico Universitario, Mexico City, D.F.	1962 FIFA World Cup qualifier	MEX	3–0	80,000	11–1–1 MEX
March 7, 1965	Memorial Coliseum, Los Angeles, California	1966 FIFA World Cup qualifier	Draw	2–2	19,337	11–2–1 MEX
March 12, 1965	Estadio Olímpico Universitario, Mexico City, D.F.	1966 FIFA World Cup qualifier	MEX	2–0	64,285	12–2–1 MEX
September 3, 1972	Estadio Azteca, Mexico City, D.F.	1974 FIFA World Cup qualifier	MEX	3–1	29,891	13–2–1 MEX
September 10, 1972	Memorial Coliseum, Los Angeles, California	1974 FIFA World Cup qualifier	MEX	2–1	9,620	14–2–1 MEX
October 16, 1973	Estadio Azteca, Mexico City, D.F.	Friendly	MEX	2–0	14,000	15–2–1 MEX
September 5, 1974	Estadio Universitario, San Nicolás de los Garza, Nuevo León	Friendly	MEX	3–1	25,000	16–2–1 MEX
September 8, 1974	Cotton Bowl, Dallas, Texas	Friendly	MEX	1–0	22,164	17–2–1 MEX
August 24, 1975	Estadio Azteca, Mexico City, D.F.	Friendly	MEX	2–0		18–2–1 MEX
October 3, 1976	Memorial Coliseum, Los Angeles, California	1978 FIFA World Cup qualifier	Draw	0–0	31,171	18–3–1 MEX
October 15, 1976	Estadio Cuauhtémoc, Puebla, Puebla	1978 FIFA World Cup qualifier	MEX	3–0	35,000	19–3–1 MEX
September 27, 1977	Estadio Universitario, San Nicolás de los Garza, Nuevo León	Friendly	MEX	3–0	20,000	20–3–1 MEX
November 9, 1980	Estadio Azteca, Mexico City, D.F.	1982 FIFA World Cup qualifier	MEX	5–1	90,000	21–3–1 MEX
November 23, 1980	Lockhart Stadium, Fort Lauderdale, Florida	1982 FIFA World Cup qualifier	USA	2–1	2,126	21–3–2 MEX
October 17, 1984	Estadio Neza 86, Ciudad Nezahualcóyotl, Estado de México	Friendly	MEX	2–1		22–3–2 MEX
March 12, 1991	Memorial Coliseum, Los Angeles, California	1991 North American Nations Cup	Draw	2–2	6,261	22–4–2 MEX
July 5, 1991	Memorial Coliseum, Los Angeles, California	1991 CONCACAF Gold Cup semi-final	USA	2–0	41,103	22–4–3 MEX
July 25, 1993	Estadio Azteca, Mexico City, D.F.	**1993 CONCACAF Gold Cup final**	MEX	4–0	120,000	23–4–3 MEX
October 13, 1993	RFK Stadium, Washington, D.C.	Friendly	Draw	1–1	23,927	23–5–3 MEX
June 4, 1994	Rose Bowl, Pasadena, California	Friendly	USA	1–0	91,123	23–5–4 MEX
June 18, 1995	RFK Stadium, Washington, D.C.	1995 U.S. Cup	USA	4–0	38,615	23–5–5 MEX
July 17, 1995	Estadio Parque Artigas, Paysandú, Uruguay	1995 Copa América quarterfinal	USA win on penalties	0–0 (4–1 p)	15,000	23–6–5 MEX (Note: Matches that go to penalty shootouts are always counted as ties by FIFA, regardless of which team won.)
June 16, 1996	Rose Bowl, Pasadena, California	1996 U.S. Cup	Draw	2–2	92,216	23–7–5 MEX
January 19, 1997	Rose Bowl, Pasadena, California	1997 U.S. Cup	MEX	2–0	31,725	24–7–5 MEX
April 20, 1997	Foxboro Stadium, Foxborough, Massachusetts	1998 FIFA World Cup qualifier	Draw	2–2	57,877	24–8–5 MEX
November 2, 1997	Estadio Azteca, Mexico City, D.F.	1998 FIFA World Cup qualifier	Draw	0–0	115,000	24–9–5 MEX
February 15, 1998	Memorial Coliseum, Los Angeles, California	**1998 CONCACAF Gold Cup final**	MEX	1–0	91,255	25–9–5 MEX
March 13, 1999	Qualcomm Stadium, San Diego, California	1999 U.S. Cup	MEX	2–1	50,234	26–9–5 MEX
August 1, 1999	Estadio Azteca, Mexico City, D.F.	1999 Confederations Cup semi-final	MEX	1–0 (a.e.t.)	65,000	27–9–5 MEX
June 11, 2000	Giants Stadium, East Rutherford, New Jersey	2000 U.S. Cup	USA	3–0	45,008	27–9–6 MEX
October 25, 2000	Memorial Coliseum, Los Angeles, California	Friendly	USA	2–0	61,072	27–9–7 MEX
February 28, 2001	Columbus Crew Stadium, Columbus, Ohio	2002 FIFA World Cup qualifier	USA	2–0	24,329	27–9–8 MEX
July 1, 2001	Estadio Azteca, Mexico City, D.F.	2002 FIFA World Cup qualifier	MEX	1–0	110,000	28–9–8 MEX
April 3, 2002	Invesco Field at Mile High, Denver, Colorado	Friendly	USA	1–0	48,476	28–9–9 MEX
June 17, 2002	Jeonju World Cup Stadium, Jeonju, South Korea	2002 FIFA World Cup Round of 16	USA	2–0	36,380	28–9–10 MEX
May 8, 2003	Reliant Stadium, Houston, Texas	Friendly	Draw	0–0	69,582	28–10–10 MEX
April 28, 2004	Cotton Bowl, Dallas, Texas	Friendly	USA	1–0	45,048	28–10–11 MEX
March 27, 2005	Estadio Azteca, Mexico City, D.F.	2006 FIFA World Cup qualifier	MEX	2–1	110,000	29–10–11 MEX
September 3, 2005	Columbus Crew Stadium, Columbus, Ohio	2006 FIFA World Cup qualifier	USA	2–0	24,685	29–10–12 MEX
February 7, 2007	University of Phoenix Stadium, Glendale, Arizona	Friendly	USA	2–0	62,462	29–10–13 MEX
June 24, 2007	Soldier Field, Chicago, Illinois	**2007 CONCACAF Gold Cup final**	USA	2–1	60,000	29–10–14 MEX
February 6, 2008	Reliant Stadium, Houston, Texas	Friendly	Draw	2–2	70,103	29–11–14 MEX
February 11, 2009	Columbus Crew Stadium, Columbus, Ohio	2010 FIFA World Cup qualifier	USA	2–0	23,776	29–11–15 MEX
July 26, 2009	Giants Stadium, East Rutherford, New Jersey	**2009 CONCACAF Gold Cup final**	MEX	5–0	79,156	30–11–15 MEX
August 12, 2009	Estadio Azteca, Mexico City, D.F.	2010 FIFA World Cup qualifier	MEX	2–1	110,000	31–11–15 MEX
June 25, 2011	Rose Bowl, Pasadena, California	**2011 CONCACAF Gold Cup final**	MEX	4–2	93,420	32–11–15 MEX
August 10, 2011	Lincoln Financial Field, Philadelphia, Pennsylvania	Friendly	Draw	1–1	30,138	32–12–15 MEX
August 15, 2012	Estadio Azteca, Mexico City, D.F.	Friendly	USA	1–0	56,000	32–12–16 MEX
March 26, 2013	Estadio Azteca, Mexico City, D.F.	2014 FIFA World Cup qualifier	Draw	0–0	85,500	32–13–16 MEX
September 10, 2013	Columbus Crew Stadium, Columbus, Ohio	2014 FIFA World Cup qualifier	USA	2–0	24,584	32–13–17 MEX
April 2, 2014	University of Phoenix Stadium, Glendale, Arizona	Friendly	Draw	2–2	59,066	32–14–17 MEX
April 15, 2015	Alamodome, San Antonio, Texas	Friendly	USA	2–0	64,369	32–14–18 MEX
October 10, 2015	Rose Bowl, Pasadena, California	**CONCACAF Cup**	MEX	3–2 (a.e.t.)	93,420	33–14–18 MEX
November 11, 2016	Mapfre Stadium, Columbus, Ohio	2018 FIFA World Cup qualifier	MEX	2–1	24,650	34–14–18 MEX
June 11, 2017	Estadio Azteca, Mexico City, D.F.	2018 FIFA World Cup qualifier	Draw	1–1	71,537	34–15–18 MEX
September 11, 2018	Nissan Stadium, Nashville, Tennessee	Friendly	USA	1–0	40,194	34–15–19 MEX
July 7, 2019	Soldier Field, Chicago, Illinois	**2019 CONCACAF Gold Cup final**	MEX	1–0	62,493	35–15–19 MEX
September 6, 2019	MetLife Stadium, East Rutherford, New Jersey	Friendly	MEX	3–0	47,960	36–15–19 MEX
June 6, 2021	Empower Field at Mile High, Denver, Colorado	**2021 CONCACAF Nations League final**	USA	3–2 (a.e.t.)	37,648	36–15–20 MEX
August 1, 2021	Allegiant Stadium, Paradise, Nevada	**2021 CONCACAF Gold Cup final**	USA	1–0 (a.e.t.)	61,514	36–15–21 MEX
November 12, 2021	TQL Stadium, Cincinnati, Ohio	2022 FIFA World Cup qualifier	USA	2–0	26,000	36–15–22 MEX
March 24, 2022	Estadio Azteca, Mexico City, D.F.	2022 FIFA World Cup qualifier	Draw	0–0	47,000	36–16–22 MEX
April 19, 2023	State Farm Stadium, Glendale, Arizona	Friendly	Draw	1–1	55,730	36–17–22 MEX
June 15, 2023	Allegiant Stadium, Paradise, Nevada	2023 CONCACAF Nations League semi-final	USA	3–0	65,000	36–17–23 MEX
March 24, 2024	AT&T Stadium, Arlington, Texas	**2024 CONCACAF Nations League final**	USA	2–0	59,471	36–17–24 MEX
October 15, 2024	Estadio Akron, Zapopan, Jalisco	Friendly	MEX	2–0	43,537	37–17–24 MEX
July 6, 2025	NRG Stadium, Houston, Texas	**2025 CONCACAF Gold Cup final**	MEX	2–1	70,925	38–17–24 MEX
October 3, 2026	State Farm Stadium, Glendale, Arizona	Friendly	USA	3–0	64,932	38–17–25 MEX
March 25, 2027	SoFi Stadium, Inglewood, California	2027 CONCACAF Nations League semi-final				

=== Results by location ===
==== By country ====
Country	Games	Mexico victories	U.S. victories	Draws
United States	47	13	22	12
Mexico	29	24	1	4
Cuba	1	1	0	0
Italy	1	0	1	0
South Korea	1	0	1	0
Uruguay	1	0	0	1

==== By U.S. state/district ====
State	Games	Mexico victories	U.S. victories	Draws
California	15	7	3	5
Texas	7	2	3	2
Ohio	6	1	5	0
Arizona	4	0	2	2
New Jersey	3	2	1	0
(Washington, D.C.) Washington, D.C.	2	0	1	1
Colorado	2	0	2	0
Illinois	2	1	1	0
Nevada	2	0	2	0
Florida	1	0	1	0
Massachusetts	1	0	0	1
Pennsylvania	1	0	0	1
Tennessee	1	0	1	0

== Player eligibility ==
The United States and Mexico also compete to convince players who are eligible to play for both the United States and Mexico (e.g., a player who was born in the United States to Mexican parents or vice versa) to play for their particular national team. As of 23 January 2026, seven players; Martín Vásquez, Edgar Castillo, Julián Araujo, Jonathan Gómez, Alejandro Zendejas, Richard Ledezma and Brian Gutiérrez have been capped in senior level matches for both nations.

Other cases include William Yarbrough, Isaác Brizuela, Miguel Ponce, Jonathan González, Efraín Álvarez, David Ochoa, Julián Araujo, and most recently Obed Vargas, who was capped by Mexico and became the first Alaskan to ever play for a senior national team.

- Ruben Mendoza – born March 2, 1931, in St. Louis, Missouri to Mexican parents, was a dominant player in the St. Louis leagues during the 1950s and 1960s. He earned four caps with the U.S. national team and was a member of the 1952, 1956 and 1960 U.S. Olympic teams.
- Gerardo Mascareño – born July 4, 1970, in Silver Spring, Maryland began his professional career with the Los Angeles Lazers of the MISL in 1988. Later builds a career Mexico in the early 1990s where he plays for both of Guadalajara's top clubs and bitter rivals (Atlas and Guadalajara), this move stirred controversy as it was revealed that Mascareño himself was not born on Mexican soil. On October 23, 1996, Mascareño makes his sole appearance with the Mexico national team in a friendly match against Ecuador, losing the match 1–0.
- William Yarbrough – born March 20, 1989, in Aguascalientes, Mexico to American parents, has an extensive career with Liga MX club León. Yarbrough did participate with a Mexico U20 squad in 2007 but did not obtain any playing minutes. In March 2015 he appears for the U.S. team in a friendly against Switzerland.
- Isaác Brizuela – born August 28, 1990, in San Jose, California to Mexican parents. Brizuela has made an entire career with Liga MX clubs Toluca, Atlas and Guadalajara. He was part of the Mexican delegation that obtained the gold medal in the 2011 Pan American Games. He makes his full appearance with Mexico in 2013.
- Miguel Ponce – born April 12, 1989, in Sacramento holds an extensive career with Liga MX clubs Guadalajara, Toluca and Necaxa. Ponce was part of the Mexico squads that took part in the 2011 Copa América, obtained gold medals at the 2011 Pan American Games and the 2012 Olympic Games. Makes his full appearance scoring one goal at the 2013 CONCACAF Gold Cup.
- Jonathan González – born April 13, 1999, in Santa Rosa to Mexican parents. A product of the U.S. national team youth program, González was part of the U.S. U20 squad that won the 2017 CONCACAF U-20 Championship. In 2014 he enters Liga MX club Monterrey's juvenile program and is eventually promoted to the senior squad in July 2017. In December 2017 González publicly states his wish to represent Mexico on the official scale. In January 2018 FIFA granted his request and he made his full appearance with Mexico on January 31 in a friendly match against Bosnia and Herzegovina. González has also been involved in Mexico's youth squad projects such as the 2018 Toulon Tournament in which Mexico's U20 ended as runners-up of the tournament.
- Efraín Álvarez – born June 19, 2002, in Los Angeles, California to Mexican parents, Álvarez, a product of the LA Galaxy youth reserve made his first team debut appearance with the Galaxy in March 2019. In 2015 Álvarez made appearances with the United States U15 squad leaving a good impression on the youth level scene. However, a snubbing in part of US Soccer in 2016 made Álvarez reconsider on whether to continue in the US youth development program or move to Mexico. During the 2019 FIFA U-17 World Cup he scored 4 goals for the Mexico U17 squad which earned him good press reviews. In November 2020, he was called up for a senior U.S. national team training camp session prior to a friendly match against El Salvador which was to take place on December 9. However, he did not receive any playing minutes as his FIFA clearance eligibility had not been met. In March 2021, he was listed on both the U.S. and Mexican Olympic team preliminary rosters but his clearance situation was still undetermined. Finally in March 2021, Álvarez accepts call-ups to the Mexico national squad making his debut appearance on March 30 in a friendly match against Costa Rica. On July 10, 2021, Efraín Álvarez became officially cap-tied to the Mexico national team due to having relieved an injured Hirving Lozano early on against Trinidad and Tobago in the opening match of the 2021 CONCACAF Gold Cup.
- David Ochoa – born January 16, 2001, in Oxnard, California to Mexican parents, plays with MLS side D.C. United since 2022. Ochoa had recently represented the USMNT's U17, U18 and U23 youth levels and was even part of the senior USMNT as the third choice goalkeeper during the 2021 CONCACAF Nations League Finals. Shortly after the Nations League final it was reported that Ochoa spent time training with the Mexico national team ahead of the 2021 CONCACAF Gold Cup as he did not receive any playing minutes with the USMNT during the Nations League. In August 2021, Ochoa files a one-time switch to FIFA to join the Mexico national team.
- Julian Araujo – born August 13, 2001, in Lompoc, California, Araujo had already represented various USMNT youth level squads and even appeared in one friendly match with the senior USMNT in December 2020 against El Salvador. In August 2021, Araujo had requested a one-time switch to FIFA to join the Mexico national team. FIFA authorized the transfer in early October 2021.

== Coaches ==
Only one head coach has coached both national teams; Bora Milutinović, who coached Mexico first from 1983 to 1986, playing host to that year's World Cup and a second time from 1995 to 1997. With the United States, Milutinović coached the Stars and Stripes from 1991 to 1995, again playing host in the 1994 FIFA World Cup.

== Incidents ==
Prior to an Olympic qualifying game in Guadalajara, Mexico, on February 10, 2004, Mexican media reported that U.S. player Landon Donovan urinated on the field during practice, which angered Mexican fans and media outlets. Subsequent video showed Donovan actually urinated near some bushes outside the practice areas. Two days later, on February 12, 2004, Mexico defeated the U.S. 4–0, and the crowd was heard chanting "Osama, Osama, Osama", in reference to Osama bin Laden and the September 11 attacks that occurred three years prior.

In a friendly held in Glendale, Arizona on February 7, 2007, Landon Donovan scored in extra time to give the U.S. a 2–0 lead and win over Mexico. After the goal, Mexico goalkeeper Oswaldo Sánchez tried to trip U.S. player Eddie Johnson as Johnson was running to celebrate the goal. No contact was made, and no reprimand resulted.

On February 11, 2009, the first qualifier for the 2010 World Cup was held in Columbus Crew Stadium, and resulted in a 2–0 victory for the U.S. against Mexico. After the game, as both teams headed through the tunnels to the locker room, Mexican assistant coach Francisco "Paco" Javier Ramírez slapped Frankie Hejduk in the face. Hejduk did not retaliate, and Ramirez was not reprimanded.

On June 6, 2021, in the first CONCACAF Nations League final at Empower Field at Mile High in Denver, the game between the two rivals was marred by several incidents of overly physical play and team brawls. In extra-time after Christian Pulisic scored a game-winning penalty to make it 3–2, Pulisic shushed the Mexican crowd in his celebration, which caused them to throw projectiles on the field injuring U.S. player Gio Reyna.

In the 2022 FIFA World Cup qualifier on November 12, 2021, Mexican player Luis Rodríguez violently fouled U.S. player Brenden Aaronson and clawed his eyes, receiving only a yellow to the dismay of the U.S. side. The U.S. would win the game 2–0.

On June 15, 2023, at the semi-final game between the U.S. and Mexico during the 2023 CONCACAF Nations League finals, the game was seen as a rematch of the previous 2021 Nations League matchup and resulted in a U.S. 3–0 victory. The game ultimately had 4 red cards and 10 yellow cards for violent behavior. Notably, César Montes was shown a red for violently fouling Folarin Balogun. This caused U.S. players to confront Montes, leading to a scuffle during which Weston McKennie had his shirt ripped and was in turn shown another red card. Later in the match, Gerardo Arteaga and Sergiño Dest were both sent off after shoving each other. Several off-field incidents also occurred involving Mexican fans, including thrown projectiles on the field and homophobic chanting. As a result, the match was called eight minutes into what was supposed to be 12 minutes of stoppage time. Afterward, CONCACAF officials stated that the match was ended at the referee's discretion. Stadium security and metro police ejected multiple Mexican fans for violent behavior.

On October 3, 2026 in a friendly at State Farm Stadium, Mateo Chávez was shown a red card after slapping Sebastian Berhalter with both hands in the 67th minute.

== Women's soccer ==
The two countries also have a rivalry between their women's teams, though the United States has won most matchups.

On January 28, 2018, the Mexican U-20 squad defeated the United States' team in the finals of the 2018 CONCACAF Women's U-20 Championship. After a 1–1 draw in the first 90 minutes, Mexico won the match on penalty kicks, scoring 4 against the U.S.'s total of 2. It was the third time the CONCACAF U-20 Championship featured U.S. and Mexico in the final game, and the first time that Mexico won.

On July 11th, 2022, the USWNT secured a clean sweep of the group stages in the Concacaf Women's Championship with their 1-0 victory over Mexico. Midfielder Kristie Mewis became the hero for the USWNT in the 89th minute as she scored the go-ahead goal to defeat Mexico on their home turf in Monterrey, Mexico.

On February 26th, 2024, the Mexican national team secured their second ever victory over the USWNT in the Concacaf Women's Gold Cup. In the group stage finale, Jacqueline Ovalle scored the first goal in the 38th minute, and substitute Mayra Pelayo’s second half stoppage time goal doubled the lead. This marked a historic moment for the Mexican women's team, as at the time, the United States had only lost once in the 43 matches between the teams.

On August 1st, 2025, the USWNT U-17 squad defeated the Mexican U-17 squad 1-0 in the finals of the 4 Nations Tournament in Mexico City. Nyanya Touray scored the winner for the United States in the 69th minute of the match. The USA, Canada, and Mexico no longer face each other in Concacaf U-17 Women's World Cup qualifying due to a format change, so this tournament functioned as an unofficial Concacaf U-17 championship.

=== Summary ===
The United States leads the series 41–1–2, outscoring Mexico 173–17.

=== List of matches ===
Mexico win
United States win
(Ties)

Date	Venue and city	Competition	Winner	Score	Att.	Series (W-D-L)
April 18, 1991	Stade Sylvio Cator, Port-au-Prince, Haiti	1991 Concacaf Championship	USA	12–0	40,000	1–0–0 USA
August 13, 1994	Complexe sportif Claude-Robillard, Montreal, Quebec	1994 Concacaf Championship	USA	9–0	1,821	2–0–0 USA
September 12, 1998	Foxboro Stadium, Foxborough, Massachusetts	Friendly	USA	9–0	35,462	3–0–0 USA
March 28, 1999	Rose Bowl, Pasadena, California	Friendly	USA	3–0	21,000	4–0–0 USA
May 5, 2000	Providence Park, Portland, Oregon	Friendly	USA	8–0	6,517	5–0–0 USA
December 10, 2000	Robertson Stadium, Houston, Texas	Friendly	USA	3–2	11,121	6–0–0 USA
January 12, 2002	Blackbaud Stadium, Charleston, South Carolina	Friendly	USA	7–0	5,634	7–0–0 USA
October 27, 2002	Rose Bowl, Pasadena, California	2002 Gold Cup	USA	3–0	5,568	8–0–0 USA
September 7, 2003	Spartan Stadium, San Jose, California	Friendly	USA	5–0	13,510	9–0–0 USA
November 3, 2003	Cotton Bowl, Dallas, Texas	Friendly	USA	3–1	23,176	10–0–0 USA
February 29, 2004	Estadio Nacional de Costa Rica, San Jose, Costa Rica	2004 Olympic Qualifying	USA	2–0	3,000	11–0–0 USA
March 5, 2004	Estadio Eladio Rosabal Cordero, Heredia, Costa Rica	2004 Olympic Qualifying	USA	3–2	2,500	12–0–0 USA
May 9, 2004	University Stadium, Albuquerque, New Mexico	Friendly	USA	3–0	17,805	13–0–0 USA
October 16, 2004	Arrowhead Stadium, Kansas City, Missouri	Friendly	USA	1–0	20,435	14–0–0 USA
December 8, 2004	Home Depot Center, Carson, California	Friendly	USA	5–0	15,549	15–0–0 USA
October 23, 2005	Blackbaud Stadium, Charleston, South Carolina	Friendly	USA	3–0	4,261	16–0–0 USA
September 13, 2006	PAETEC Park, Rochester, New York	Friendly	USA	3–1	6,784	17–0–0 USA
November 22, 2006	Home Depot Center, Carson, California	2006 Gold Cup	USA	2–0	6,128	18–0–0 USA
April 14, 2007	Gillette Stadium, Foxborough, Massachusetts	Friendly	USA	5–0	18,184	19–0–0 USA
October 13, 2007	Edward Jones Dome, St. Louis, Missouri	Friendly	USA	5–1	10,861	20–0–0 USA
October 17, 2007	Providence Park, Portland, Oregon	Friendly	USA	4–0	10,006	21–0–0 USA
October 20, 2007	University Stadium, Albuquerque, New Mexico	Friendly		1–1	8,972	21–1–0 USA
April 6, 2008	Estadio Olimpico Benito Juarez, Ciudad Juárez, Chihuahua	2008 Olympic Qualifying	USA	3–1	5,083	22–1–0 USA
March 28, 2010	Torero Stadium, San Diego, California	Friendly	USA	3–0	3,069	23–1–0 USA
March 31, 2010	Rio Tinto Stadium, Sandy, Utah	Friendly	USA	1–0	3,732	24–1–0 USA
November 5, 2010	Estadio de Béisbol Beto Ávila, Cancún, Quintana Roo	2010 World Cup Qualifying	MEX	2–1	8,374	24–1–1 USA
June 5, 2011	Red Bull Arena, Harrison, New Jersey	Friendly	USA	1–0	5,852	25–1–1 USA
January 24, 2012	BC Place, Vancouver, British Columbia	2012 Olympic Qualifying	USA	4–0	7,599	26–1–1 USA
September 3, 2013	RFK Stadium, Washington, DC	Friendly	USA	7–0	12,594	27–1–1 USA
September 13, 2014	Rio Tinto Stadium, Sandy, Utah	Friendly	USA	8–0	8,849	28–1–1 USA
September 18, 2014	Sahlen's Stadium, Rochester, New York	Friendly	USA	4–0	5,680	29–1–1 USA
October 24, 2014	PPL Park, Chester, Pennsylvania	2014 Concacaf Championship	USA	3–0	8,773	30–1–1 USA
May 17, 2015	StubHub Center, Carson, California	Friendly	USA	5–1	27,000	31–1–1 USA
February 13, 2016	Toyota Stadium, Frisco, Texas	2016 Olympic Qualifying	USA	1–0	15,032	32–1–1 USA
April 5, 2018	EverBank Field, Jacksonville, Florida	Friendly	USA	4–1	14,360	33–1–1 USA
April 8, 2018	BBVA Stadium, Houston, Texas	Friendly	USA	6–2	15,349	34–1–1 USA
October 4, 2018	Sahlen's Stadium, Cary, North Carolina	2018 Concacaf Championship	USA	6–0	5,404	35–1–1 USA
May 26, 2019	Red Bull Arena, Harrison, New Jersey	Friendly	USA	3–0	26,332	36–1–1 USA
February 7, 2020	Dignity Health Sports Park, Carson, California	2020 Olympic Qualifying	USA	4–0	11,292	37–1–1 USA
July 1, 2021	Pratt & Whitney Stadium at Rentschler Field, East Hartford, Connecticut	Friendly	USA	4–0	21,637	38–1–1 USA
July 5, 2021	Pratt & Whitney Stadium at Rentschler Field, East Hartford, Connecticut	Friendly	USA	4–0	27,758	39–1–1 USA
July 11, 2022	Estadio Universitario, San Nicolás de los Garza, Nuevo León	2022 CONCACAF W Championship	USA	1–0	20,522	40–1–1 USA
February 26, 2024	Dignity Health Sports Park, Carson, California	2024 CONCACAF W Gold Cup	MEX	2–0	11,612	40–1–2 USA
July 13, 2024	Red Bull Arena, Harrison, New Jersey	Friendly	USA	1–0	26,376	41–1–2 USA

== In popular culture ==
A 2012 documentary, Gringos at the Gate / Ahi Vienen Los Gringos, written and directed by Pablo Miralles, Roberto Donati, and Michael Whalen, focuses on the cultural differences between the United States and Mexico when it comes to soccer. This includes the conflict of Mexican-American players in the U.S. while their family might support Mexico.

The three-part documentary series Good Rivals, originally titled Good Neighbors, focused on the rivalry and featured interviews from past players and coaches. It was released in 2022 on Amazon Prime Video.

== See also ==
- Hexagonal (CONCACAF)
