= Gerardo Martino =

Argentine football manager (born 1962)

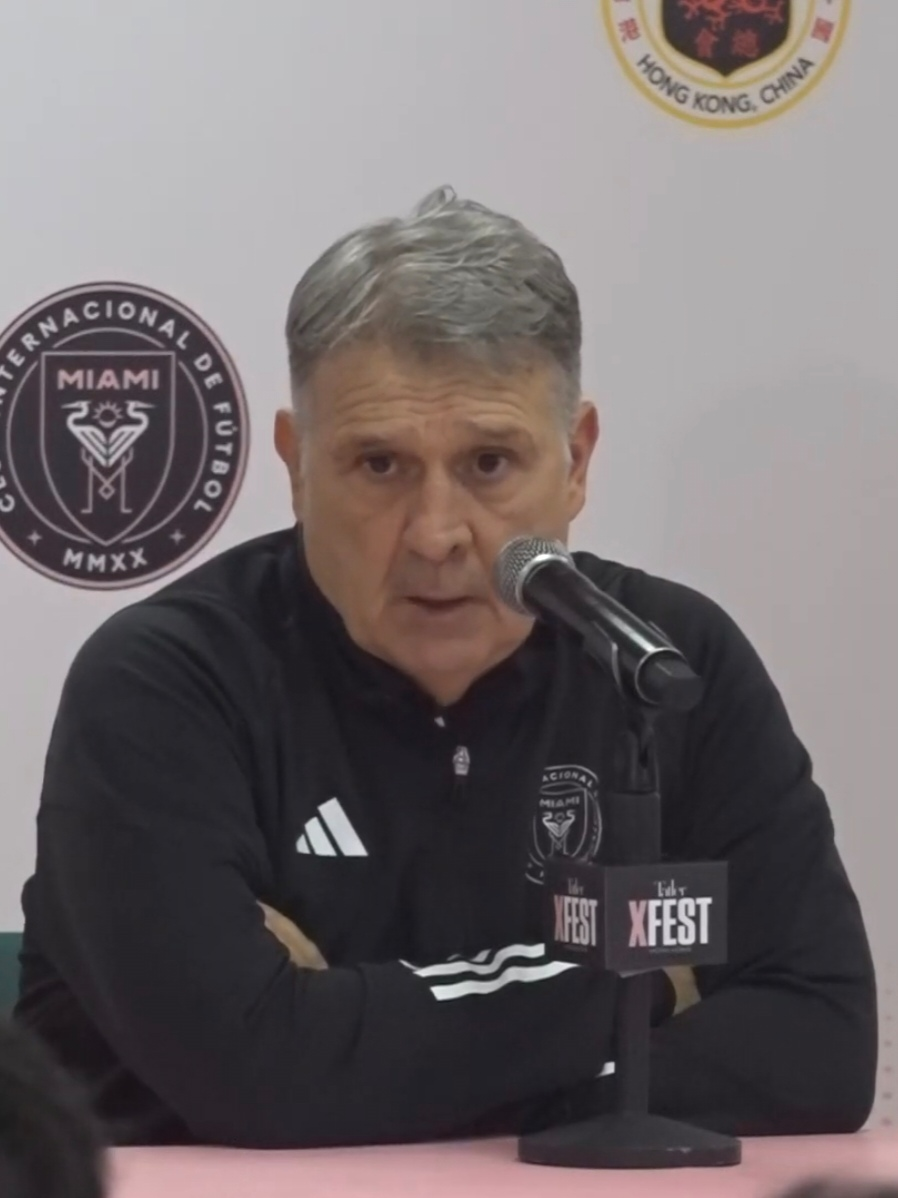
- Martino with Inter Miami in 2024

Personal information
- Full name: Gerardo Daniel Martino
- Date of birth: 20 November 1962 (age 63)
- Place of birth: Rosario, Argentina
- Height: 1.70 m (5 ft 7 in)
- Position: Attacking midfielder

Team information
- Current team: Atlanta United (head coach)

Youth career
- 1972–1980: Newell's Old Boys

Senior career*
Years	Team	Apps	(Gls)
1980–1990	Newell's Old Boys	392	(35)
1991	Tenerife	15	(1)
1991–1994	Newell's Old Boys	81	(2)
1994–1995	Lanús	30	(3)
1995	Newell's Old Boys	15	(0)
1996	O'Higgins	11	(1)
1996	Barcelona SC	5	(0)
Total		551	(42)

International career
1981	Argentina U20	2	(0)
1991	Argentina	1	(0)

Managerial career
- 1998: Brown de Arrecifes
- 1999: Platense
- 2000: Instituto
- 2002–2003: Libertad
- 2003–2004: Cerro Porteño
- 2005: Colón
- 2005–2006: Libertad
- 2007–2011: Paraguay
- 2012–2013: Newell's Old Boys
- 2013–2014: Barcelona
- 2014–2016: Argentina
- 2016–2018: Atlanta United
- 2019–2022: Mexico
- 2023–2024: Inter Miami
- 2025–: Atlanta United
Medal record
Men's football
Representing Mexico (as manager)
CONCACAF Gold Cup
Winner	2019 United States	Team
Runner-up	2021 United States	Team
CONCACAF Nations League
Runner-up	2021 United States	Team
Representing Argentina (as manager)
Copa América
Runner-up	2015 Chile	Team
Runner-up	2016 United States	Team
Representing Paraguay (as manager)
Copa América
Runner-up	2011 Argentina	Team
- * Club domestic league appearances and goals

Gerardo Daniel "Tata" Martino (born 20 November 1962) is an Argentine professional football coach and former player who is the head coach of Major League Soccer club Atlanta United.

Martino played mostly for Newell's Old Boys in his native Rosario. He holds the record of appearances with the team, playing a total of 505 matches in all official competitions. He was also selected in a fans' poll as Newell's best player throughout the club's history.

Martino was chosen to replace Tito Vilanova as head coach of Barcelona at the start of the 2013–14 season, but announced his resignation on 17 May 2014, though his side finished runner-up in both the Copa del Rey and La Liga that season. In 2015, he led Argentina to the Copa América Final, only to be defeated by hosts Chile on penalties. His team also finished as runners-up in the Copa América Centenario, again losing to the defending champion Chile on penalties. On 5 July 2016, Martino resigned from the Argentina national team.

He was named the head coach of Atlanta United, a MLS expansion team that began play in 2017. Martino led the team to an MLS Cup victory in their second season and was named the MLS Coach of the Year before departing for the Mexico national team. He spent three years leading the side and left Mexico after being knocked out in the group stage in the 2022 FIFA World Cup.

In 2023, Martino returned to MLS, being appointed as head coach of Inter Miami, where he joined former Barcelona players Lionel Messi, Jordi Alba and Sergio Busquets, as well as former Atlanta United player Josef Martínez. He left after the 2024 season to tend to a personal matter in his native Argentina.

On 6 November 2025, Martino returned to Atlanta United as its head coach on a two-year contract.

== Playing career ==
Gerardo Martino played professionally from 1980 to 1996, mainly as an attacking midfielder. In his hometown of Rosario, he is most closely linked to Newell's Old Boys, where he is renowned for having made the most official appearances in the club's history with 505 games. He played a significant role in winning three Argentine Primera América titles in the 1987–88, 1990–91, and 1992 Clausura seasons during his several stints with Newell's 1980–1990, 1991–1994, and 1995 seasons. His influence was so great that he was subsequently named the greatest player in the club's history in a fan vote.

On 15 February 1981, Martino debuted with the Argentina national youth football team in a 3–0 friendly victory against Chile. Ten years later, on 19 February 1991, he received his first call-up by new coach Alfio Basile to the senior squad for a friendly match against Hungary national football team. Martino came on in the second half as Argentina won 2–0 on home soil.

Martino briefly played European football outside of Argentina when he moved to Spain in 1991 to play for CD Tenerife, where he made 15 appearances and scored one goal. Between 1994 and 1995, he also played domestically for Lanús, making 30 appearances and scoring three goals. Before formally retiring from professional play in 1996, he played for O'Higgins in Chile and Barcelona SC in Ecuador as his career came to an end.

Martino represented Argentina at several levels on the international scene. He participated in the 1981 FIFA World Youth Championship squad and made his U20 national team debut in February of that same year. His senior international career was brief; under coach Alfio Basile, he only received one cap for the Argentina national team in a friendly match against Hungary in February 1991.

== Coaching career ==
=== Paraguay national team ===
Martino was assigned as head coach of the Paraguay national football team in February 2007, replacing Uruguayan Anibal "Maño" Ruiz. His knowledge and success while coaching Paraguayan clubs were the parameters that positioned him as the best option for the job (other candidates were Nery Pumpido and Miguel Ángel Russo). Previously, Martino had won the Paraguayan league four times from 2002 to 2006.

In 2008, Martino was linked for vacant managerial position of Iran Pro League side Steel Azin, but the deal was cancelled for personal reasons. On 5 July 2010, Martino announced that he would be stepping down as Paraguay coach on their return from the 2010 FIFA World Cup, in which he led Paraguay to quarter-finals. Martino confirmed that with his four-year contract expiring, he would not be extending his spell in charge of the national side. However, on 10 July 2010, Martino agreed to stay on as Paraguay coach until after the 2011 Copa America, in which Paraguay were runners-up after losing to Uruguay in the final.

=== Newell's Old Boys ===
After Hernán Darío Gómez's departure from the Colombia national team, Martino received a proposition to coach the team but turned it down, opting instead to coach Newell's Old Boys, one of his former clubs as a player, and a club which at the time was dangerously close to relegation to the Primera B Nacional, the second tier of Argentine football. However, a series of impressive results under Martino secured top-flight status for Newell's, and Martino's reputation as a coach increased quite significantly.

Following his first season at Newell's, Martino won the 2013 Torneo Final, the second and final stage of the Argentine Primera División season, and reached the semi-finals of the 2013 Copa Libertadores. As a result, Martino won further plaudits as a coach, having transformed Newell's from a team facing relegation on his arrival to a title-winning side, in addition to reaching the 2013 Copa Libertadores semi-final, the pinnacle club competition organized by CONMEBOL. This turnaround increased Martino's stock as a coach, and his achievements at Newell's soon caught the attention of various clubs in Europe, including Barcelona.

=== Barcelona ===
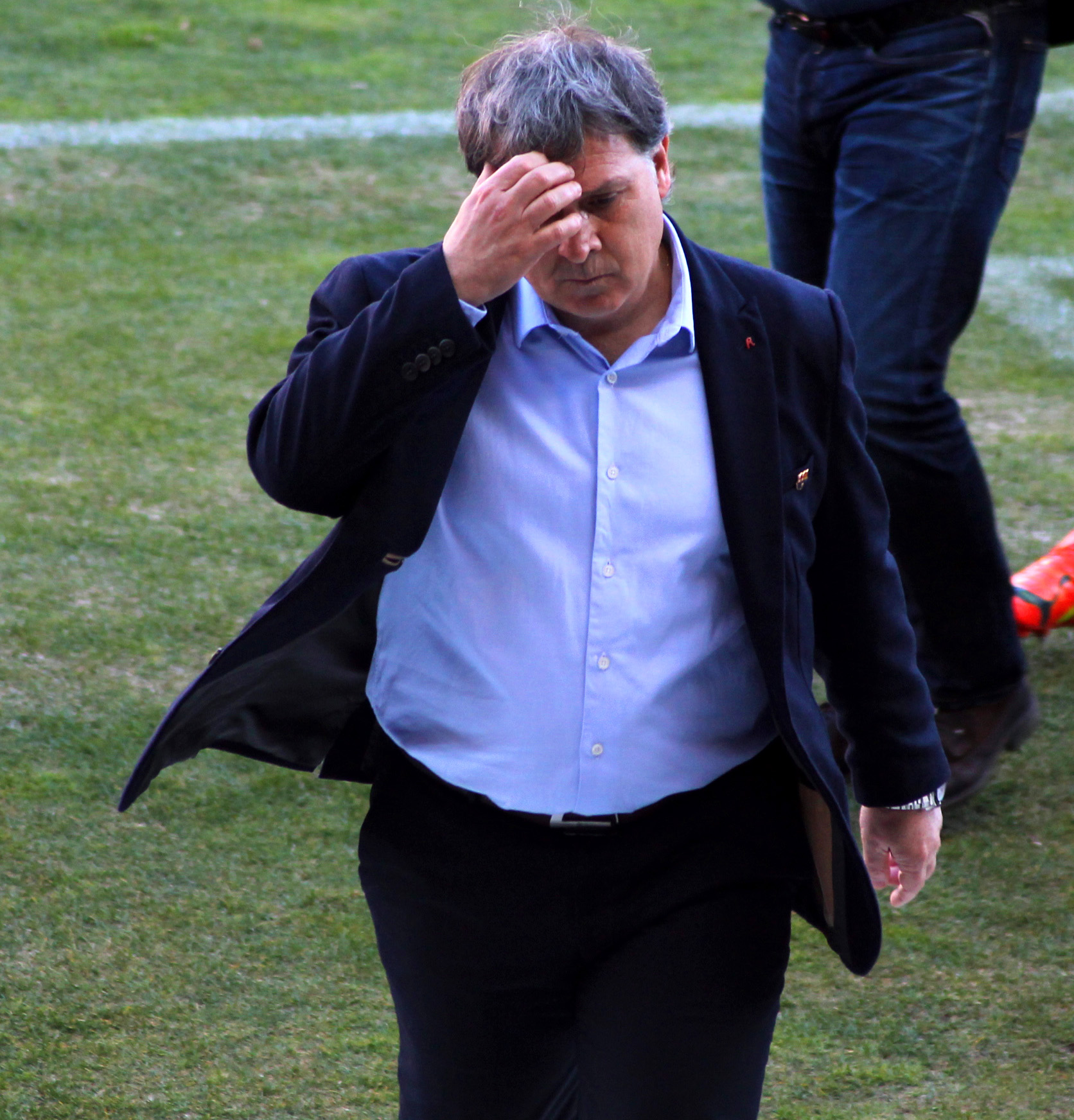
Martino with Barcelona in 2014

On 7 July 2013, Martino was confirmed as head coach of Spanish club Barcelona to replace Tito Vilanova, who resigned three days earlier due to health issues. He signed a two-year deal at Barcelona.

His first competitive game in charge of Barça was on 18 August 2013 against Levante, a game which Barcelona won 7–0 on the opening weekend of the 2013–14 La Liga season. On 26 October 2013, Martino won 2–1 against rivals Real Madrid at the Camp Nou, winning his first Clásico as a Barcelona coach. Three days later, Barcelona went on to win 0–3 at Celta Vigo, and Martino became the first coach in Barcelona history to not lose a game in his first 16 matches. On 20 November, Martino's unbeaten start as Barcelona coach came to an end after his 21st game in charge, as Barcelona lost 2–1 away at Ajax in the 2013–14 UEFA Champions League. After conceding the 2013–14 La Liga title on the last day of the season to Atlético Madrid, Martino announced he was to leave his role after just one year in charge, during which he did not manage to win any major trophy except the Spanish Super Cup.

=== Argentina national team ===
On 12 August 2014, Martino was introduced as the new head coach for the Argentina national team, succeeding Alejandro Sabella, who took the side into the final against Germany at the World Cup in Brazil. In the 2015 Copa América, he reached the final, in which Argentina were runners-up after losing to hosts Chile on penalties. They also finished as runners-up in the Copa América Centenario Final on 26 June 2016 against Chile, again losing on penalties. On 5 July 2016, Martino resigned.

=== Atlanta United ===
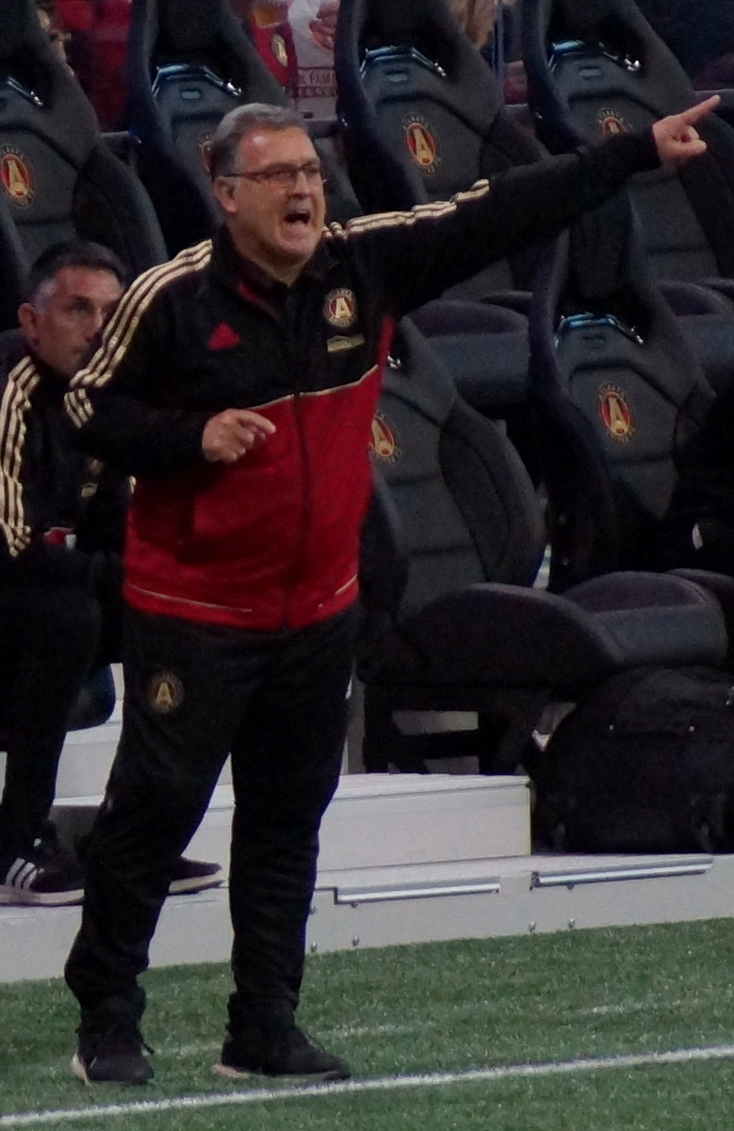
Martino with Atlanta United in 2017

After departing from Argentina, Martino was announced as Major League Soccer expansion team Atlanta United's inaugural season head coach on 27 September 2016. On 23 October 2018, Martino announced that he would not renew his contract with Atlanta United following the conclusion of the 2018 MLS season, citing personal reasons. He was expected to sign with the Mexico national team. Atlanta defeated the Portland Timbers in the MLS Cup, winning their first league title in Martino's last match with the club.

=== Mexico national team ===
On 7 January 2019, Martino was announced as head coach of the Mexico national team in his return to international management since leaving Argentina in May 2016. On 22 March, Martino won his first match with Mexico with a 3–1 win over Chile in a friendly. Later in the same year, Martino and Mexico won the CONCACAF Gold Cup over rivals the United States in a 1–0 victory, his first national title.

But in 2021, Martino saw a steep drop in form, losing both the inaugural CONCACAF Nations League final and CONCACAF Gold Cup to the United States. This was further compounded with a 2–0 loss to the United States in World Cup qualifying in November, marking the first time in the rivalry since 1934 that one side had swept three matches against the other in a calendar year.

In the 2022 FIFA World Cup, Martino led Mexico to their biggest failure in 44 years, since Mexico finished third in their group behind Poland on goal difference, resulting in their first exit from the group stage since 1978. Following their last group match against Saudi Arabia, Martino fulfilled his contract as head coach of Mexico, as reports were coming out that he would be let go even if Mexico made a deep run in the World Cup, due to his unpopularity and combative persona.

=== Inter Miami ===
On 28 June 2023, Martino was announced as head coach of Inter Miami, marking his return to MLS after leaving Atlanta United in 2018. Right away, Martino's team won the Leagues Cup, Inter Miami's first trophy, behind the heroics of summer signing Lionel Messi. Miami also made the 2023 U.S. Open Cup final, losing to Houston Dynamo.

Martino led Inter Miami's strong turnaround in the 2024 MLS season, taking a team that had finished 27th in the Supporters' Shield standings in 2023 to 1st, winning the Supporters' Shield and setting a league record for points in a season.

On 22 November 2024, after losing to Atlanta United in round one of the 2024 MLS Cup playoffs, Martino announced that he was stepping down from his role with Inter Miami "due to personal reasons".

=== Return to Atlanta United ===
On 6 November 2025, Martino returned to Atlanta United as head coach, signing a two-year contract through 2027.

== Managerial style ==
Gerardo Martino prefers to play a very high-pressing and attacking style of football. At Barcelona, Martino continued the club's preferred style of play tiki-taka along with his own tactics. All of Martino's teams have the same distinguishable traits: they play attack-minded football, they are creative, and the style is based on quick passing. In addition, Martino's teams also pressure high up the pitch, play out from the back and depend on their youth systems.

== Managerial statistics ==
As of 7 November 2026

Managerial record by team and tenure
Team	Nat	From	To	Record				
Team	Nat	From	To	G	W	D	L	Win %
Brown de Arrecifes	(Argentina)	1 January 1998	31 December 1998	32	13	6	13	40.63
Platense	(Argentina)	1 January 1999	31 December 1999	19	4	5	10	21.05
Instituto	(Argentina)	1 January 2000	31 December 2000	42	24	11	7	57.14
Libertad	(Paraguay)	1 January 2002	30 June 2003	81	42	20	19	51.85
Cerro Porteño	(Paraguay)	1 July 2003	31 December 2004	46	29	10	7	63.04
Colón	(Argentina)	1 January 2005	30 June 2005	21	7	8	6	33.33
Libertad	(Paraguay)	1 July 2005	30 June 2006	75	39	19	17	52.00
Paraguay	(Paraguay)	1 July 2007	29 July 2011	71	24	24	23	33.80
Newell's Old Boys	(Argentina)	1 January 2012	22 July 2013	71	36	18	17	50.70
Barcelona	(Spain)	23 July 2013	17 May 2014	59	40	11	8	67.80
Argentina	(Argentina)	13 August 2014	5 July 2016	29	19	7	3	65.52
Atlanta United	(United States)	27 September 2016	18 December 2018	74	40	17	17	54.05
Mexico	(Mexico)	7 January 2019	30 November 2022	66	40	14	12	60.61
Inter Miami	(United States)	10 July 2023	22 November 2024	67	35	16	16	52.24
Atlanta United	(United States)	6 November 2025	Present	37	11	6	20	29.73
Total				790	403	192	195	51.01

== Personal life ==
Martino is of Italian descent with grandparents from Ripacandida, Basilicata.

== Honours ==
=== Player ===
Newell's Old Boys

- Argentine Primera División: 1987–88, 1990–91, 1992 Clausura
- Copa Libertadores runner-up: 1988, 1992

=== Manager ===
Libertad

- Paraguayan Primera División: 2002, 2003, 2006

Cerro Porteño

- Paraguayan Primera División: 2004

Newell's Old Boys

- Argentine Primera División: 2013 Final

Barcelona

- Supercopa de España: 2013
- Copa del Rey runner-up: 2013–14

Atlanta United

- MLS Eastern Conference: 2018
- MLS Cup: 2018

Inter Miami

- Leagues Cup: 2023
- U.S. Open Cup runner-up: 2023
- Supporters' Shield: 2024

Paraguay

- Copa América runner-up: 2011

Argentina

- Copa América runner-up: 2015, 2016

Mexico

- CONCACAF Gold Cup: 2019
- CONCACAF Nations League runner-up: 2019–20

Individual

- South American Coach of the Year: 2007
- MLS All-Star: 2018
- MLS Coach of the Year: 2018
