= 2021 CONCACAF Nations League Finals squads =

The 2021 CONCACAF Nations League Finals was an international football tournament held in the United States from 3 to 6 June 2021. The four national teams involved in the tournament were required to register a squad of 23 players, including three goalkeepers, by 27 May 2021, seven days prior to the opening match of the tournament. Only players in these squads were eligible to take part in the tournament. After the official announcement, changes were only allowed in case of force majeure or injury, up to 24 hours before the first match of each team.

The tournament was originally to be held in United States from 4 to 7 June 2020. On 3 April 2020, the tournament was postponed due to the COVID-19 pandemic. On 27 July 2020, CONCACAF announced that the Finals would be held in March 2021, though on 22 September 2020 CONCACAF announced that the tournament was again rescheduled until June 2021.

The age listed for each player is their age as of 3 June 2021, the first day of the tournament. The numbers of caps and goals listed for each player do not include any matches played after the start of the tournament. The club listed is the club for which the player last played a competitive match prior to the tournament. The nationality for each club reflects the national association (not the league) to which the club is affiliated. A flag is included for coaches who are of a different nationality than their own national team.

== Costa Rica ==
Manager: Rónald González Brenes

Costa Rica's 40-man preliminary squad was announced on 9 May 2021. The final squad was announced on 25 May. After the final squad announcement, a number of changes were made:

- Aarón Cruz withdrew after testing positive for COVID-19, and was replaced by Patrick Sequeira.
- Kendall Waston withdrew after testing positive for COVID-19, and was replaced by Giancarlo González.
- Felicio Brown withdrew as he was a close contact to the COVID-positive Kendall Waston, and was replaced by Jurguens Montenegro.
- Yael López withdrew due to a muscle tear in his left hamstring, and was replaced by Barlon Sequeira. Barlon Sequeira later withdrew due to a tear in his right thigh, and was not replaced.
- Rónald Matarrita withdrew injured, and was replaced by Joseph Mora.
- Luis Díaz withdrew due to a right knee injury, and was replaced by Ariel Lassiter.

No.	Pos.	Player	Date of birth (age)	Caps	Goals	Club
1	GK	Esteban Alvarado	28 April 1989 (aged 32)	19	0	(Costa Rican Football Federation) Limón
2	FW	Ariel Lassiter	27 September 1994 (aged 26)	9	0	(United States Soccer Federation) Houston Dynamo FC
3	DF	Aarón Salazar	15 May 1999 (aged 22)	0	0	(Costa Rican Football Federation) Herediano
4	DF	Keysher Fuller	12 July 1994 (aged 26)	10	1	(Costa Rican Football Federation) Herediano
5	MF	Celso Borges	27 May 1988 (aged 33)	131	23	(Royal Spanish Football Federation) Deportivo La Coruña
6	DF	Óscar Duarte	3 June 1989 (aged 32)	55	2	(Royal Spanish Football Federation) Levante
7	FW	Johan Venegas	27 November 1988 (aged 32)	60	11	(Costa Rican Football Federation) Alajuelense
8	DF	Bryan Oviedo	18 February 1990 (aged 31)	57	2	(Danish Football Association) Copenhagen
9	FW	Jurguens Montenegro	13 December 2000 (aged 20)	0	0	(Costa Rican Football Federation) Alajuelense
10	MF	Bryan Ruiz (captain)	18 August 1985 (aged 35)	127	26	(Costa Rican Football Federation) Alajuelense
11	MF	Randall Leal	14 January 1997 (aged 24)	17	0	(United States Soccer Federation) Nashville SC
12	FW	Joel Campbell	26 June 1992 (aged 28)	96	18	(Mexican Football Federation) León
13	MF	Allan Cruz	24 February 1996 (aged 25)	19	2	(United States Soccer Federation) FC Cincinnati
14	MF	Bernald Alfaro	26 January 1997 (aged 24)	2	0	(Costa Rican Football Federation) Alajuelense
15	DF	Francisco Calvo	8 July 1992 (aged 28)	53	6	(United States Soccer Federation) Chicago Fire FC
17	MF	Yeltsin Tejeda	17 March 1992 (aged 29)	56	0	(Costa Rican Football Federation) Herediano
18	GK	Patrick Sequeira	1 March 1999 (aged 22)	0	0	(Royal Spanish Football Federation) Celta Vigo B
19	DF	Giancarlo González	8 February 1988 (aged 33)	83	2	(United States Soccer Federation) LA Galaxy
20	MF	Gerson Torres	28 August 1997 (aged 23)	2	0	(Costa Rican Football Federation) Herediano
21	MF	Alonso Martínez	15 October 1998 (aged 22)	0	0	(Costa Rican Football Federation) Alajuelense
22	DF	Joseph Mora	15 January 1993 (aged 28)	4	0	(United States Soccer Federation) D.C. United
23	GK	Leonel Moreira	2 April 1990 (aged 31)	15	0	(Costa Rican Football Federation) Alajuelense

== Honduras ==
Manager: (Uruguay) Fabián Coito

Honduras' 40-man preliminary squad was announced on 9 May 2021. The final squad was announced on 24 May. Due to injury, Maylor Núñez and Romell Quioto were replaced by Kervin Arriaga and Jorge Benguché respectively.

No.	Pos.	Player	Date of birth (age)	Caps	Goals	Club
1	GK	Edrick Menjívar	1 March 1993 (aged 28)	3	0	(National Autonomous Federation of Football of Honduras) Olimpia
2	DF	Kevin Álvarez	3 August 1996 (aged 24)	3	0	(Swedish Football Association) Norrköping
3	DF	Maynor Figueroa (captain)	2 May 1983 (aged 38)	165	5	(United States Soccer Federation) Houston Dynamo FC
4	DF	Marcelo Pereira	27 May 1995 (aged 26)	14	0	(National Autonomous Federation of Football of Honduras) Motagua
5	DF	Éver Alvarado	30 January 1992 (aged 29)	28	1	(National Autonomous Federation of Football of Honduras) Olimpia
6	MF	Bryan Acosta	24 November 1993 (aged 27)	45	2	(United States Soccer Federation) FC Dallas
7	FW	Alberth Elis	12 February 1996 (aged 25)	44	10	(Portuguese Football Federation) Boavista
8	MF	Edwin Rodríguez	25 September 1999 (aged 21)	4	0	(National Autonomous Federation of Football of Honduras) Olimpia
9	FW	Anthony Lozano	25 April 1993 (aged 28)	33	9	(Royal Spanish Football Federation) Cádiz
10	MF	Alexander López	6 May 1992 (aged 29)	34	4	(Costa Rican Football Federation) Alajuelense
11	MF	Rigoberto Rivas	31 July 1998 (aged 22)	7	0	(Italian Football Federation) Reggina
12	FW	Jorge Benguché	21 May 1996 (aged 25)	4	2	(Portuguese Football Federation) Boavista
13	MF	Kervin Arriaga	5 January 1998 (aged 23)	1	0	(National Autonomous Federation of Football of Honduras) Marathón
14	MF	Boniek García	11 April 1984 (aged 37)	126	3	(United States Soccer Federation) Houston Dynamo FC
15	DF	Elvin Oliva	24 October 1997 (aged 23)	0	0	(National Autonomous Federation of Football of Honduras) Olimpia
16	DF	Johnny Leverón	7 February 1990 (aged 31)	37	3	(National Autonomous Federation of Football of Honduras) Olimpia
17	FW	Jonathan Toro	21 October 1996 (aged 24)	8	3	(Portuguese Football Federation) Chaves
18	GK	Alex Güity	20 September 1997 (aged 23)	0	0	(National Autonomous Federation of Football of Honduras) Olimpia
19	MF	Walter Martínez	26 March 1991 (aged 30)	4	0	(National Autonomous Federation of Football of Honduras) Motagua
20	MF	Deybi Flores	16 June 1996 (aged 24)	6	0	(National Autonomous Federation of Football of Honduras) Olimpia
21	MF	Jhow Benavídez	26 December 1995 (aged 25)	5	0	(National Autonomous Federation of Football of Honduras) Real España
22	GK	Luis López	13 September 1993 (aged 27)	28	0	(National Autonomous Federation of Football of Honduras) Real España
23	DF	Diego Rodríguez	6 November 1995 (aged 25)	2	1	(National Autonomous Federation of Football of Honduras) Motagua

== Mexico ==
Manager: (Argentina) Gerardo Martino

Mexico's 40-man preliminary squad was announced on 9 May 2021. The final squad was announced on 25 May. Due to injury, Jonathan dos Santos and Érick Gutiérrez were replaced by Sebastián Córdova and Diego Lainez.

No.	Pos.	Player	Date of birth (age)	Caps	Goals	Club
1	GK	Alfredo Talavera	18 September 1982 (aged 38)	31	0	(Mexican Football Federation) UNAM
2	DF	Néstor Araujo	29 August 1991 (aged 29)	42	3	(Royal Spanish Football Federation) Celta Vigo
3	DF	Carlos Salcedo	29 September 1993 (aged 27)	40	1	(Mexican Football Federation) UANL
4	MF	Edson Álvarez	24 October 1997 (aged 23)	36	2	(Royal Dutch Football Association) Ajax
5	DF	Jorge Sánchez	10 December 1997 (aged 23)	13	0	(Mexican Football Federation) América
6	MF	Sebastián Córdova	12 June 1997 (aged 23)	6	2	(Mexican Football Federation) América
7	DF	Luis Romo	5 June 1995 (aged 25)	6	0	(Mexican Football Federation) Cruz Azul
8	MF	Carlos Rodríguez	3 January 1997 (aged 24)	17	0	(Mexican Football Federation) Monterrey
9	FW	Henry Martín	18 November 1992 (aged 28)	9	2	(Mexican Football Federation) América
10	MF	Orbelín Pineda	24 April 1996 (aged 25)	27	2	(Mexican Football Federation) Cruz Azul
11	FW	Alan Pulido	8 March 1991 (aged 30)	14	5	(United States Soccer Federation) Sporting Kansas City
12	GK	Rodolfo Cota	3 July 1987 (aged 33)	4	0	(Mexican Football Federation) León
13	GK	Guillermo Ochoa	13 July 1985 (aged 35)	111	0	(Mexican Football Federation) América
14	MF	Diego Lainez	9 June 2000 (aged 20)	10	1	(Royal Spanish Football Federation) Real Betis
15	DF	Héctor Moreno	17 January 1988 (aged 33)	110	4	Unattached
16	MF	Héctor Herrera	19 April 1990 (aged 31)	79	6	(Royal Spanish Football Federation) Atlético Madrid
17	FW	Jesús Corona	6 January 1993 (aged 28)	47	8	(Portuguese Football Federation) Porto
18	MF	Andrés Guardado (captain)	28 September 1986 (aged 34)	164	28	(Royal Spanish Football Federation) Real Betis
19	DF	Gerardo Arteaga	7 September 1998 (aged 22)	8	0	(Royal Belgian Football Association) Genk
20	MF	Uriel Antuna	21 August 1997 (aged 23)	17	8	(Mexican Football Federation) Guadalajara
21	DF	Luis Rodríguez	21 January 1991 (aged 30)	24	1	(Mexican Football Federation) UANL
22	FW	Hirving Lozano	30 July 1995 (aged 25)	44	14	(Italian Football Federation) Napoli
23	DF	Jesús Gallardo	15 August 1994 (aged 26)	51	0	(Mexican Football Federation) Monterrey

== United States ==
Manager: Gregg Berhalter

The United States' 40-man preliminary squad was announced on 9 May 2021. The final squad was announced on 24 May.

No.	Pos.	Player	Date of birth (age)	Caps	Goals	Club
1	GK	Zack Steffen	2 April 1995 (aged 26)	21	0	(The Football Association) Manchester City
2	DF	Sergiño Dest	3 November 2000 (aged 20)	8	1	(Royal Spanish Football Federation) Barcelona
3	DF	Matt Miazga	19 July 1995 (aged 25)	21	1	(Royal Belgian Football Association) Anderlecht
4	MF	Tyler Adams	14 February 1999 (aged 22)	12	1	(German Football Association) RB Leipzig
5	DF	Antonee Robinson	8 August 1997 (aged 23)	10	0	(The Football Association) Fulham
6	DF	John Brooks	28 January 1993 (aged 28)	41	3	(German Football Association) VfL Wolfsburg
7	FW	Giovanni Reyna	13 November 2002 (aged 18)	5	2	(German Football Association) Borussia Dortmund
8	MF	Weston McKennie	28 August 1998 (aged 22)	22	6	(Italian Football Federation) Juventus
9	FW	Josh Sargent	20 February 2000 (aged 21)	14	5	(German Football Association) Werder Bremen
10	FW	Christian Pulisic (captain)	18 September 1998 (aged 22)	36	15	(The Football Association) Chelsea
11	FW	Brenden Aaronson	22 October 2000 (aged 20)	5	2	(Austrian Football Association) Red Bull Salzburg
12	GK	Ethan Horvath	9 June 1995 (aged 25)	5	0	(Royal Belgian Football Association) Club Brugge
13	DF	Tim Ream	5 October 1987 (aged 33)	43	1	(The Football Association) Fulham
14	MF	Jackson Yueill	19 March 1997 (aged 24)	10	0	(United States Soccer Federation) San Jose Earthquakes
15	DF	Mark McKenzie	25 February 1999 (aged 22)	3	0	(Royal Belgian Football Association) Genk
16	FW	Jordan Siebatcheu	26 April 1996 (aged 25)	3	0	(Swiss Football Association) Young Boys
17	MF	Sebastian Lletget	3 September 1992 (aged 28)	21	7	(United States Soccer Federation) LA Galaxy
18	MF	Yunus Musah	29 November 2002 (aged 18)	5	0	(Royal Spanish Football Federation) Valencia
19	GK	David Ochoa	16 January 2001 (aged 20)	0	0	(United States Soccer Federation) Real Salt Lake
20	DF	Reggie Cannon	11 June 1998 (aged 22)	15	0	(Portuguese Football Federation) Boavista
21	FW	Timothy Weah	22 February 2000 (aged 21)	11	1	(French Football Federation) Lille
22	DF	DeAndre Yedlin	9 July 1993 (aged 27)	63	0	(Turkish Football Federation) Galatasaray
23	MF	Kellyn Acosta	24 July 1995 (aged 25)	28	2	(United States Soccer Federation) Colorado Rapids

== Player representation ==
=== By age ===
==== Outfield players ====
- Oldest: (Honduras) Boniek García (37 years, 61 days)
- Youngest: (United States) Yunus Musah (18 years, 194 days)

==== Goalkeepers ====
- Oldest: (Mexico) Alfredo Talavera (38 years, 266 days)
- Youngest: (United States) David Ochoa (20 years, 146 days)

==== Captains ====
- Oldest: (Honduras) Maynor Figueroa (38 years, 40 days)
- Youngest: (United States) Christian Pulisic (22 years, 266 days)

=== By club ===
Players	Club(s)
7	(Honduras) Olimpia (Costa Rica) Alajuelense
4	(Mexico) América (Costa Rica) Herediano

=== By club nationality ===
Key
Bold	Nation represented at the tournament
Italic	Nation not a CONCACAF member

Players	Clubs
14	**Mexico**; **United States**
13	**Honduras**
11	**Costa Rica**
10	Spain
5	Portugal
4	Belgium; England; Germany
