= 2024 CONCACAF Nations League final =

Soccer match between international teams

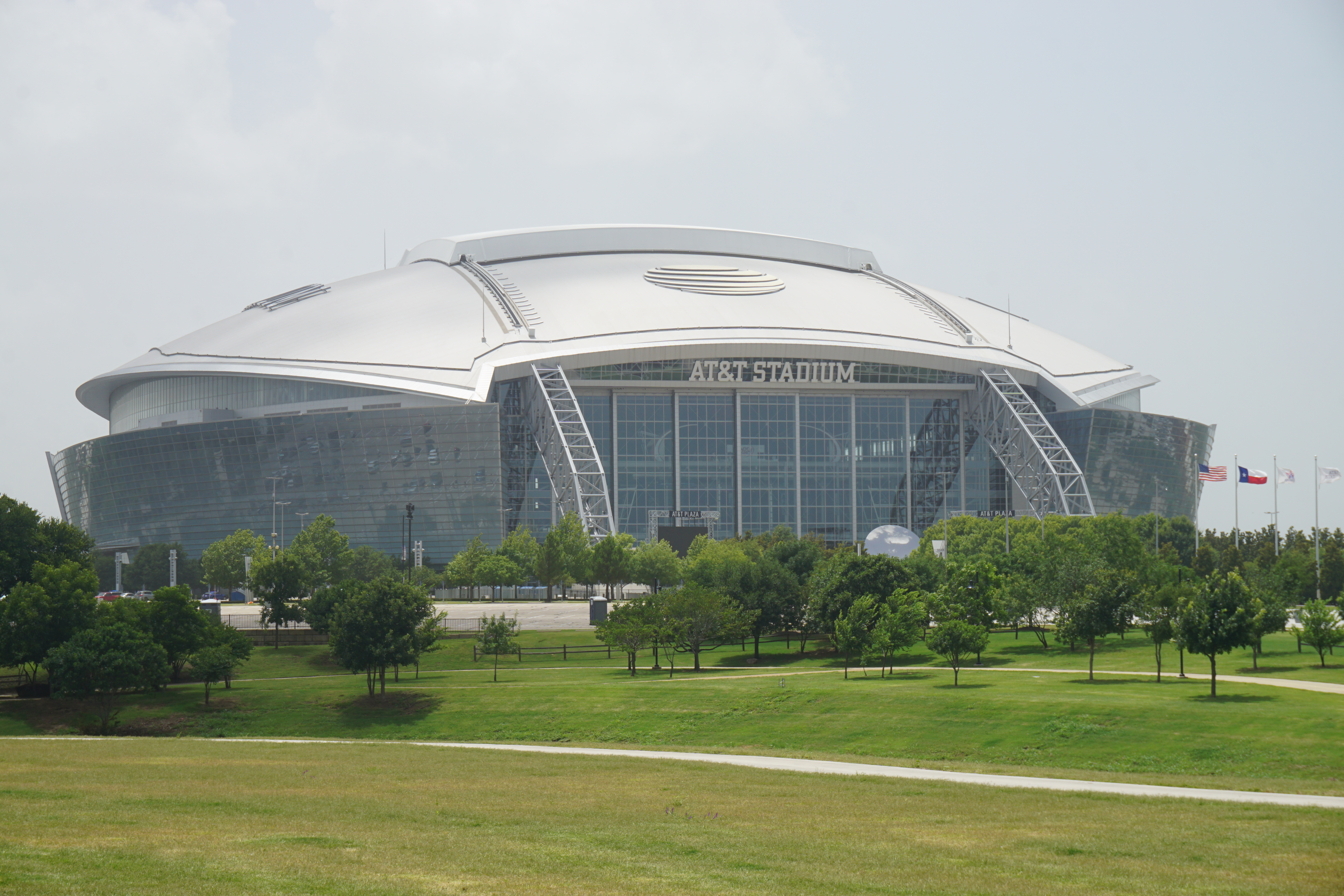
- AT&T Stadium, the host venue for the final
- Event: 2024 CONCACAF Nations League Finals
Mexico	United States
(Mexico)	(United States)
0	2
- Date: March 24, 2024
- Venue: AT&T Stadium, Arlington, Texas, U.S.
- Man of the Match: Giovanni Reyna (United States)
- Referee: Drew Fischer (Canada)
- Attendance: 59,471
- Weather: Windy, 66 °F (19 °C)

The 2024 CONCACAF Nations League final was a soccer match to determine the winner of the 2023–24 CONCACAF Nations League. The match was the third final of the CONCACAF Nations League, an international tournament contested by the men's national teams representing the member associations of CONCACAF, which covers North America, Central America, and the Caribbean.

The United States defeated Mexico 2–0 to claim the title for the third straight time.

== Venue ==
The match was played at AT&T Stadium in Arlington, Texas, United States.

== Route to final ==
Note: In all results below, the score of the finalist is given first (H: home; A: away; N: neutral site).

United States		Round	Mexico
Opponent	Result	Quarter-finals	Opponent	Result
Trinidad and Tobago	3–0 (H)	Leg 1	Honduras	0–2 (A)
Trinidad and Tobago	1–2 (A)	Leg 2	Honduras	2–0 (a.e.t.) (4–2 p) (H)
Opponent	Result	Nations League Finals	Opponent	Result
Jamaica	3–1 (a.e.t.) (H)	Semi-finals	Panama	3–0 (N)

=== United States ===
The United States were the defending champions of the Nations League after winning it back-to-back in 2021 and 2023 to Mexico and Canada respectively.

The Americans opened their defense of the Nations League title having to secure a two-legged quarter-final win against Trinidad & Tobago to advance to both the CONCACAF Nations League Finals and to qualify to the 2024 Copa América, which was hosted on home soil. The first leg was played on 16 November 2023 in the Q2 Stadium in Austin, Texas. The match ended up in a 3-0 victory for the United States with late goals from Ricardo Pepi, Antonee Robinson and Giovanni Reyna, which gained them a three-goal-lead before playing the second leg. Four days later, on the Hasely Crawford Stadium, Port Spain, the Americans got shocked by the Soca Warriors, which defeated them 2-1 in a match which was initially won by the visitors after an Antonee Robinson goal in the 25th minute which gave them a lead that was later reverted with two goals from Reon Moore and Alvin Jones in the 43th and 57th minute respectively. Nevertheless, the aggregate was 4-2 in favour of the Americans, which gave them the pass to both the CONCACAF Nations League Finals and the Copa América, whilst Trinidad and Tobago had to gain his pass to the latter tournament against Canada.

The United States earned a 3–1 victory against Jamaica in the semifinal played in AT&T Stadium in Arlington, Texas, in a match they were initially losing by a Greg Leigh header that struck into Matt Turner's left top corner after just 33 seconds. The Americans could only get an equalizer 95 minutes after, when a corner kick was headed by Miles Robinson but deflected on Cory Burke into Andre Blake's goal, which led the game into extra time, in which Reyna, who was subbed on at half-time, assisted Haji Wright, who was subbed on in the 63rd minute, two times in the 96th and 109th minute to put the United States into its third consecutive Nations League final.

=== Mexico ===
This was Mexico's second Nations League final, having lost the 2021 edition against the United States 3-2. In the 2023 edition, Mexico were eliminated in the semi-finals by the United States 3-0, though Mexico went on to win 3rd place after defeating Panama 1-0.

El Tri's 2024 campaign started against Honduras in the quarter-finals. That first leg was played in the Estadio Nacional Chelato Uclés, in Tegucigalpa, in which Honduras shocked Mexico, defeating them 2-0 with goals from Anthony Lozano and Bryan Róchez, which required Mexico to avenge the result at home or else fail to qualify for both the 2024 Nations League Finals and the 2024 Copa América. Four days later, the second quarter-final leg took place in the Estadio Azteca, Ciudad de México. Mexico dominated the match from the beginning, but couldn't score until Luis Chávez converted a free kick in the 43rd minute, followed by a crucial late equalizer in the aggregate in the 10th minute of stoppage time in the second half by Edson Álvarez. That led the game into extra time and eventually penalties, in which Mexico prevailed by 4-2, assuring its qualification to the semi-finals.

Mexico defeated Panama 3-0 in the semifinal played in the AT&T Stadium in Arlington, Texas, with the latter controlling the majority of the game and having more possession than El Tri, but failing to capitalize on its chances and eventually conceding three times with Edson Álvarez, Julián Quiñones and Orbelín Pineda scoring to guide Mexico into the second Nations League final in its history.

== Match ==
=== Summary ===
Mexico arrived to the final missing Julián Araujo which suffered an injury in the previous match against Panama and was thus replaced by Jorge Sánchez, which was the only change in the starting lineup on the final in relation to the one from the semi-final match. As with the starting lineup from the past match, Jaime Lozano was widely criticized for choosing América's Henry Martín instead of young Feyenoord top scorer Santiago Giménez. The United States recovered Sergiño Dest, who was suspended due to a double yellow received during the second leg of the quarter-final match against Trinidad & Tobago on 20 November 2023. Tyler Adams was announced to be in the starting XI which marked his return to the USMNT after being ruled out due to a year-long hamstring injury. Tim Ream returned to the starting XI after being replaced by Miles Robinson in the match against Jamaica and, after their performance against the latter, Giovanni Reyna and Haji Wright replaced both Malik Tillman and Folarin Balogun.

The match started with United States controlling the ball and the majority of the possession, which nearly materialized in the 5th minute when Christian Pulisic controlled the ball in the penalty area and could get past César Montes and Johan Vázquez to end up making a close-range shot which was saved by Guillermo Ochoa. Mexico's most prominent attack came in the 22nd minute when Jesús Gallardo attempted a throw-in into the United States penalty area that, after a header, landed in Luis Chávez's feet and made a weak shot at the right of Matt Turner which was controlled. In the 38th minute, Sergiño Dest attempted a solo run in which he dribbled Luis Chávez and Érick Sánchez and attempted a long-range shot which past upon the crossbar. Right before half-time, in the 45th minute, Tyler Adams attempted a long range shot which struck right into Ochoa's right top corner to make it 1-0 for the United States, and entered half time leading the score.

Gregg Berhalter made a substitution at half, subbing off Adams and bringing onto the field Johnny Cardoso. The match continued to be a United States monologue, which frustrated Mexican players which had to draw upon several fouls to gain possession back, this resulted in Johan Vázquez, Edson Álvarez and Uriel Antuna gaining a yellow card in an 8-minute span between the 55th and the 63rd minute. Mexico's second attack in the whole match came in the 61st minute, when a long ball from Ochoa landed in the three-quarter line and was headed by Hirving Lozano to Henry Martín which controlled the ball to the edge of the goal area and shot it wide. The second goal from the United States came two minutes after, when Christian Pulisic dribbled his way into the penalty area and his cross was rejected by Vázquez only for Giovanni Reyna to intercept the ball and struck it from the edge of the penalty and putting it in Ochoa's right bottom corner. Immediately after the 2-0, Jaime Lozano brought onto the field Santiago Giménez and Orbelín Pineda for Uriel Antuna and Érick Sánchez respectively, whilst Berhalter replaced Haji Wright with Folarin Balogun. In the 71st minute, Giménez fell in the area at the same time Antonee Robinson cleared the ball near his chest, which gained Mexico a penalty that was later revised by the VAR and issued Giménez a yellow card for simulating the foul. The rest of the match the United States handed possession for a while, which gave Mexico the opportunity of making a few shots on goal that went wide. In the 88th minute, another close range shot was saved by Ochoa, this time from Johnny. After having to stop the match several times due to homophobic chants, the match was ended in the 99th minute, after only adding up 6 minutes. Giovanni Reyna was awarded the man of the match.

=== Details ===
March 24, 2024
21:15 (20:15 UTC−5)

Mexico	0–2	United States
	Report	Adams 45'; Reyna 63'

AT&T Stadium, Arlington
Attendance: 59,471
Referee: Drew Fischer (Canada)

Mexico	United States

GK	13	Guillermo Ochoa (c)
RB	19	Jorge Sánchez
CB	3	César Montes
CB	5	Johan Vásquez	(yellow card) 55'
LB	23	Jesús Gallardo		(substituted off) 90+2'
DM	4	Edson Álvarez	(yellow card) 58'
CM	14	Érick Sánchez		(substituted off) 65'
CM	18	Luis Chávez		(substituted off) 80'
RF	15	Uriel Antuna	(yellow card) 63'	(substituted off) 65'
CF	20	Henry Martín
LF	22	Hirving Lozano
Substitutions:
MF	17	Orbelín Pineda		(substituted on) 65'
FW	11	Santiago Giménez	(yellow card) 74'	(substituted on) 65'
MF	7	Luis Romo		(substituted on) 80'
DF	6	Gerardo Arteaga		(substituted on) 90+2'
Manager:
Jaime Lozano

GK	1	Matt Turner
RB	2	Sergiño Dest
CB	3	Chris Richards
CB	13	Tim Ream
LB	5	Antonee Robinson
DM	4	Tyler Adams		(substituted off) 46'
CM	8	Weston McKennie	(yellow card) 27'
CM	7	Giovanni Reyna		(substituted off) 79'
RF	21	Timothy Weah		(substituted off) 90+2'
CF	14	Haji Wright		(substituted off) 66'
LF	10	Christian Pulisic (c)		(substituted off) 90+2'
Substitutions:
MF	15	Johnny Cardoso		(substituted on) 46'
FW	20	Folarin Balogun		(substituted on) 66'
MF	6	Yunus Musah		(substituted on) 79'
FW	17	Malik Tillman		(substituted on) 90+2'
FW	11	Brenden Aaronson		(substituted on) 90+2'
Manager:
Gregg Berhalter

Man of the Match:
Giovanni Reyna (United States)

Assistant referees:
Micheal Barwegen (Canada)
Lyes Arfa (Canada)
Fourth official:
Mario Escobar (Guatemala)
Video assistant referee:
Tatiana Guzmán (Nicaragua)
Assistant video assistant referee:
Daneon Parchment (Jamaica)
