= 2021 CONCACAF Nations League final =

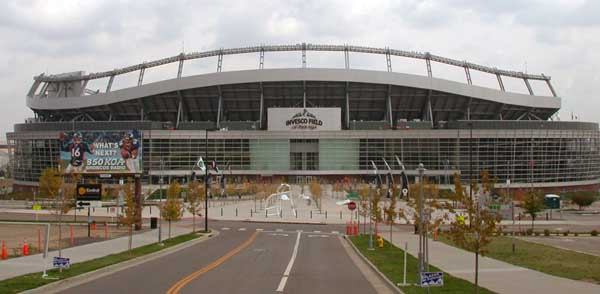
- The Empower Field at Mile High in Denver, Colorado hosted the final
- Event: 2020 CONCACAF Nations League Finals
United States	Mexico
(United States)	(Mexico)
3	2
- After extra time
- Date: June 6, 2021
- Venue: Empower Field at Mile High, Denver, Colorado, United States
- Man of the Match: Ethan Horvath (United States)
- Referee: John Pitti (Panama)
- Attendance: 37,648

The 2021 CONCACAF Nations League final was a soccer match that determined the winners of the final tournament of the 2019–20 CONCACAF Nations League. It was the inaugural final of the CONCACAF Nations League, an international soccer competition involving the men's national teams of the member associations of CONCACAF.

The United States won the final 3–2 after extra time to become the first champions of the CONCACAF Nations League.

== Scheduling and venue changes ==
The match was originally scheduled to be held on June 7, 2020, at AT&T Stadium in Arlington, Texas, United States. On April 3, 2020, the final tournament was postponed due to the COVID-19 pandemic.

On July 27, 2020, CONCACAF announced that the Nations League Finals would be held in March 2021, though on September 22, 2020, CONCACAF announced that the event was again rescheduled until June 2021.

== Venue ==
The final was played at Empower Field at Mile High, an American football venue in Denver, Colorado. The venue seats 76,125 spectators, although COVID-19 regulations at the time of the match artificially reduced capacity by 50%. It is primarily used by the Denver Broncos of the National Football League, but had previously hosted the Colorado Rapids of Major League Soccer. Empower Field at Mile High had also hosted two matches of the Gold Cup group stage in 2013, 2015, and 2019. CONCACAF announced its selection of Empower Field at Mile High as the venue for the CONCACAF Nations League Finals on April 15, 2021.

== Route to the final ==
Note: In all results below, the score of the finalist is given first (H: home; A: away).

United States
Round
Mexico
Opponents
Result
League phase
Opponents
Result
Cuba
7–0 (H)
Match 1
Bermuda
5–1 (A)
Canada
0–2 (A)
Match 2
Panama
3–1 (H)
Canada
4–1 (H)
Match 3
Panama
3–0 (A)
Cuba
4–0 (A)
Match 4
Bermuda
2–1 (H)
Group A winners

Pos	Team	Pld	Pts
1	United States	4	9
2	Canada	4	9
3	Cuba (R)	4	0

Source: CONCACAF
(R) Relegated
Final standings
Group B winners

Pos	Team	Pld	Pts
1	Mexico	4	12
2	Panama	4	3
3	Bermuda (R)	4	3

Source: CONCACAF
(R) Relegated
Opponents
Result
Nations League Finals
Opponents
Result
Honduras
1–0
Semi-finals
Costa Rica
0–0 (5–4 p)

== Broadcasting ==
The Nations League Final was broadcast in the United States on the CBS Sports Network and Paramount+ in English and on Univision in Spanish. The Univision broadcast drew a 0.8 Nielsen rating, peaking at approximately 1.96 million viewers and tying a Celebrity Family Feud broadcast for the most-watched primetime broadcast of the day. The match was broadcast in Mexico by Televisa and in Canada by OneSoccer.

== Match ==
=== First half ===
Mexico wasted little time opening the scoring, as forward Jesús Corona intercepted a poor pass by US defender Mark McKenzie in the attacking third and fired a shot past goalkeeper Zack Steffen into the back of the net just over a minute into the contest. Mexico continued to apply pressure and appeared to double their lead when Héctor Moreno headed the ball into the back of the net off a free kick, but the VAR judged Moreno to be offside, and the goal was disallowed.

Four minutes later, the United States equalized when a Christian Pulisic corner kick found the head of Weston McKennie. While his attempt at goal struck the post, the rebound fell to Giovanni Reyna, who easily scored from close range to make it 1–1, which would stand as the scoreline until halftime.

=== Second half ===
The United States made several threatening attempts to take the lead off set pieces, notably two headed attempts at goal by McKennie and McKenzie, both of which required impressive diving saves by Mexico goalkeeper Guillermo Ochoa. In the 67th minute, Zack Steffen suffered an injury and was replaced by Ethan Horvath.

In the 79th minute, Mexico substitute Diego Lainez broke the deadlock mere minutes after coming on, dribbling past US defender Tim Ream before slotting a left-footed shot beyond the outstretched arms of Horvath to restore Mexico's lead. However, three minutes later, the US equalized again, as McKennie headed a Reyna corner that grazed the fingertips of Ochoa but ultimately found the net, making the score 2–2. Following an acrobatic diving save by Horvath, denying Hirving Lozano a would-be winner in stoppage time, and a brief delay due to offensive chants from the Mexican crowd, the full-time whistle sounded and the match proceeded into extra time.

=== Extra time ===
Mexico controlled most of the game in the first extra session but could not convincingly threaten the United States' goal, and the first 15 minutes ended goalless.

In the second period, Pulisic was brought down in the box. While play initially continued, VAR eventually alerted the referee, who awarded a penalty to the US after consulting the review monitor. In the 114th minute, Pulisic successfully converted the spot kick with a strike into the upper-right corner of the goal, giving the US their first lead of the match, 3–2.

Immediately, Pulisic took off his shirt, running towards the left-side corner flag, joined in celebration by his teammates, and taunting the Mexico fans by putting a finger to his lips. Some fans responded by throwing projectiles onto the pitch toward the US players, one of which hit Reyna in the head. Reyna briefly fell to the ground in pain but was ultimately not seriously injured.

Mexico had one final chance to send the match to a penalty shoot-out, which would have been the first in the 87-year history of the Mexico-United States rivalry. With time winding down, a header from a Mexican corner struck the hand of McKenzie inside the box. This was initially unnoticed, but following consultation with VAR, the referee awarded Mexico a penalty. In stoppage time, Mexico veteran Andrés Guardado stepped up to take the penalty, which was saved by Horvath. Minutes later, the final whistle sounded, giving the United States their first non-friendly victory over their arch-rivals since a World Cup qualifier in 2013, and their first defeat of Mexico in a CONCACAF final since the 2007 CONCACAF Gold Cup final.

=== Details ===
June 6, 2021
19:00 (Note: Though listed with a 19:00 kick-off time, the match actually began at 19:36.)

United States	3–2 (a.e.t.)	Mexico
Reyna 27'; McKennie 82'; Pulisic 114' (pen.)	Report	Corona 2'; Lainez 79'

Empower Field at Mile High, Denver
Attendance: 37,648
Referee: John Pitti (Panama)

United States	Mexico

GK	1	Zack Steffen		(substituted off) 69'
CB	15	Mark McKenzie	(yellow card) 86'
CB	6	John Brooks	(yellow card) 10'
CB	13	Tim Ream		(substituted off) 83'
RM	22	DeAndre Yedlin	(yellow card) 90+4'	(substituted off) 105+1'
CM	8	Weston McKennie
CM	23	Kellyn Acosta	(yellow card) 49'
LM	2	Sergiño Dest		(substituted off) 60'
RW	7	Giovanni Reyna		(substituted off) 83'
CF	9	Josh Sargent		(substituted off) 68'
LW	10	Christian Pulisic (c)	(yellow card) 115'
Substitutions:
FW	21	Timothy Weah		(substituted on) 60'
FW	16	Jordan Pefok		(substituted on) 68'
GK	12	Ethan Horvath		(substituted on) 69'
MF	17	Sebastian Lletget		(substituted on) 83'
MF	4	Tyler Adams		(substituted on) 83'
DF	20	Reggie Cannon		(substituted on) 105+1'
Manager:
Gregg Berhalter

GK	13	Guillermo Ochoa (c)
CB	2	Néstor Araujo
CB	4	Edson Álvarez		(substituted off) 117'
CB	15	Héctor Moreno		(substituted off) 100'
RM	21	Luis Rodríguez
CM	16	Héctor Herrera	(yellow card) 90+2'	(substituted off) 100'
CM	8	Carlos Rodríguez		(substituted off) 66'
LM	23	Jesús Gallardo
RW	17	Jesús Corona		(substituted off) 66'
CF	20	Uriel Antuna		(substituted off) 78'
LW	22	Hirving Lozano	(yellow card) 111'
Substitutions:
DF	7	Luis Romo		(substituted on) 66'
FW	9	Henry Martín		(substituted on) 66'
MF	14	Diego Lainez		(substituted on) 78'
DF	3	Carlos Salcedo		(substituted on) 100'
MF	18	Andrés Guardado	(yellow card) 120+10'	(substituted on) 100'
MF	10	Orbelín Pineda		(substituted on) 117'
Manager:
(Argentina) Gerardo Martino			(red card) 110'

Man of the Match:
Ethan Horvath (United States)

Assistant referees:
Caleb Wales (Trinidad and Tobago)
Jassett Kerr-Wilson (Jamaica)
Fourth official:
Oshane Nation (Jamaica)
Video assistant referee:
Drew Fischer (Canada)
Assistant video assistant referee:
Daneon Parchment (Jamaica)

Match rules

- 90 minutes
- 30 minutes of extra time if necessary
- Penalty shoot-out if scores still level
- Maximum of twelve named substitutes
- Maximum of five substitutions, with a sixth allowed in extra time (Note: Each team was given only three opportunities to make substitutions, with a fourth opportunity in extra time, excluding substitutions made at half-time, before the start of extra time and at half-time in extra time.)

=== Statistics ===
Overall
Statistic	United States	Mexico
Goals scored	3	2
Total shots	13	18
Shots on target	7	7
Saves	5	4
Ball possession	41%	59%
Corner kicks	6	4
Fouls committed	18	13
Offsides	2	5
Yellow cards	5	3
Red cards	0	1
