= Weston McKennie =

American soccer player (born 1998)

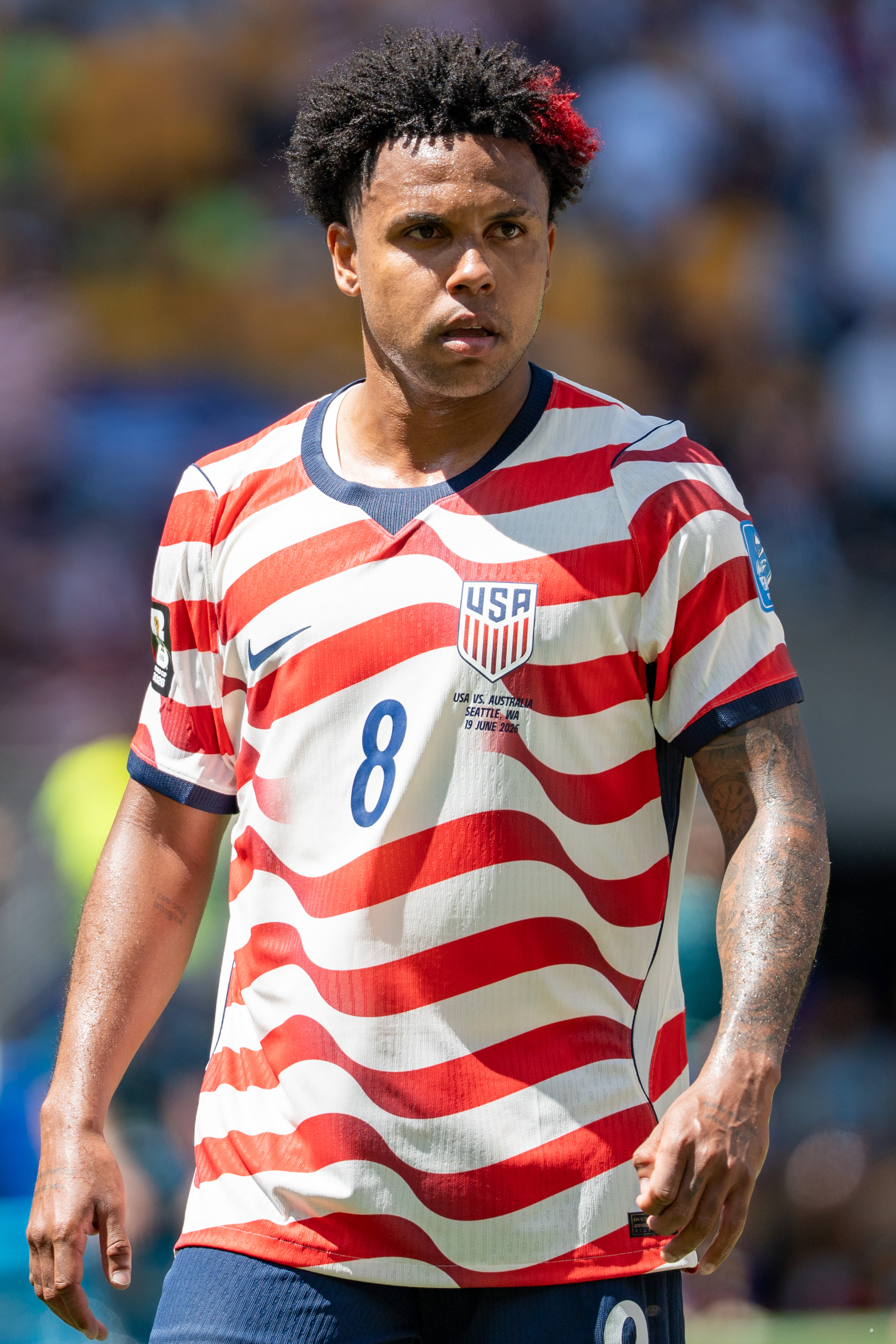
- McKennie with the United States in 2026

Personal information
- Full name: Weston James Earl McKennie
- Date of birth: August 28, 1998 (age 28)
- Place of birth: Fort Lewis, Washington, U.S.
- Height: 5 ft 11 in (1.80 m)
- Position: Midfielder

Team information
- Current team: Juventus
- Number: 22

Youth career
- 2004–2009: FC Phönix Otterbach
- 2009–2016: FC Dallas
- 2016–2017: Schalke 04

Senior career*
Years	Team	Apps	(Gls)
2017–2021	Schalke 04	75	(4)
2020–2021	→ Juventus (loan)	21	(4)
2021–	Juventus	160	(13)
2023	→ Leeds United (loan)	19	(0)

International career^{‡}
2013–2014	United States U17	6	(0)
2016	United States U19	9	(2)
2016	United States U20	2	(0)
2017–	United States	73	(13)
Medal record
Representing United States
Men's soccer
CONCACAF Gold Cup
Runner-up	2019 United States
CONCACAF Nations League
Winner	2021 United States
Winner	2023 United States
Winner	2024 United States
- * Club domestic league appearances and goals as of 23:08, November 22, 2026 (UTC) ‡ National team caps and goals as of November 17, 2026

Weston James Earl McKennie (born August 28, 1998) is an American professional soccer player who plays primarily as a midfielder for Serie A club Juventus and the United States national team. A highly versatile player, he has been described as a "Swiss Army Knife" and is routinely deployed in any outfield position.

A youth prospect from FC Dallas, McKennie began his senior club career at Bundesliga side Schalke 04 after rising through the team's academy sector. In 2017–18, he established himself as a first team player and played three full seasons. In August 2020, McKennie joined Serie A champions Juventus on loan, winning the 2020 Supercoppa Italiana. The move was made permanent in March 2021, which he later won the 2020–21 Coppa Italia in the same season. In 2023 he was loaned to Premier League club Leeds United, after which he returned to Juventus and won the 2023–24 Coppa Italia.

McKennie has represented the United States internationally at both the youth and senior levels. He made his senior debut in 2017, and was part of the U.S. sides that finished runners-up at the CONCACAF Gold Cup in 2019, and won the CONCACAF Nations League in 2021, 2023, and 2024, winning the best player award of the 2021 tournament. Individually, McKennie won the U.S. Soccer Male Player of the Year award in 2020.

== Early life ==
Although born at Fort Lewis, Washington, McKennie considers Little Elm, Texas, his home town. He lived in Kaiserslautern, Germany, from age six to nine as his father, a United States Air Force officer, was stationed at nearby Ramstein Air Base. McKennie started playing soccer for the local club FC Phönix Otterbach in 2004, before moving back to the United States. McKennie played for the youth system of Major League Soccer side FC Dallas for seven years from 2009 to 2016, before moving to Schalke. His transfer to Schalke was the main catalyst for FC Dallas to create their reserve team, North Texas SC, which played in USL League One. In February 2016, McKennie signed a National Letter of Intent to play for the University of Virginia, but he subsequently turned down the scholarship offer to play for the Cavaliers, and instead sought to go professional.

== Club career ==
=== Schalke 04 ===
==== 2016–2018 ====
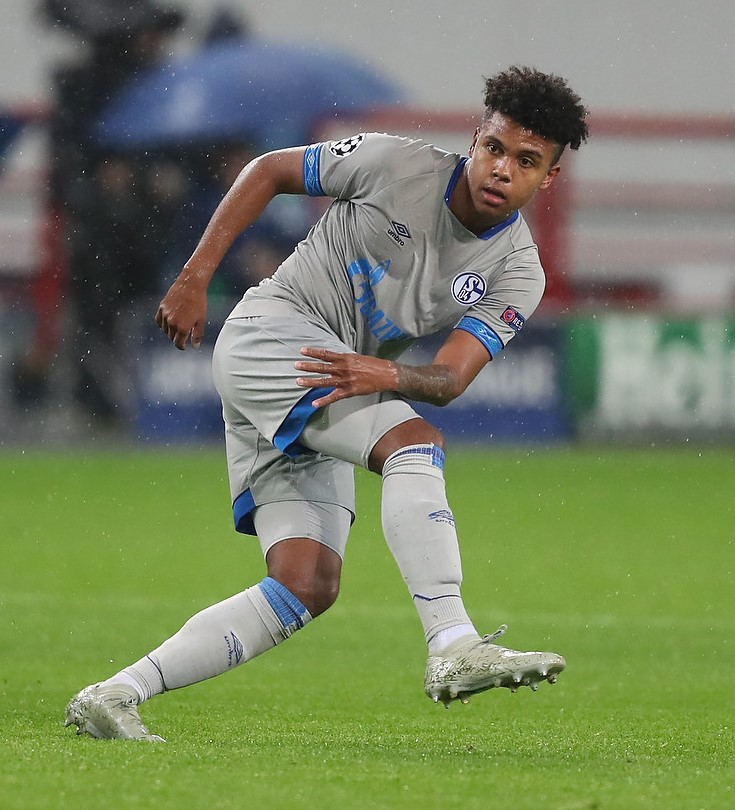
McKennie playing for Schalke 04 in 2018

In July 2016 McKennie declined to sign a Homegrown Player contract with FC Dallas. He joined German Bundesliga side Schalke 04 in August 2016. After spending less than a year with Schalke's academy team, McKennie was promoted to the first-team squad in May 2017. He made his professional debut on May 20, 2017, as a 77th-minute substitute during a 1–1 draw with Ingolstadt 04. This was his only appearance during the 2016–17 season. McKennie made his first start in September 2017 and signed a five-year contract shortly after. During the same year, McKennie made 21 appearances and scored 4 goals with Schalke's U-19 team.

During the 2017–18 season, McKennie cemented his place as a member of the Schalke first team at the age of 19. He made 22 appearances in the Bundesliga. He finished the 2017–18 season with 25 appearances in all competitions. Further, he proved to be a valuable asset to Schalke given his versatility, with McKennie playing multiple positions in the midfield and defense for the team.

==== 2018–2020 ====
During the 2018–19 season, McKennie further increased his position with the Bundesliga club, starting 25 games for the club in both the Bundesliga, the DFB-Pokal and the UEFA Champions League. Overall, McKennie made 33 appearances for the club and scored two goals in all competitions, in which he scored his first Champions League goal in a 1–0 away win over Lokomotiv Moscow.

Under new manager David Wagner, McKennie further established himself as an important part and valuable asset of a team that struggled to deal with the COVID-19 pandemic. McKennie made a total of 28 appearances and scored three goals for Schalke in the Bundesliga. McKennie made a further four appearances in the DFB-Pokal for the club. On May 30, 2020, during a 1–0 loss to Werder Bremen, McKennie wore an armband that said “Justice for George” following the murder of George Floyd in the United States.

=== Juventus ===
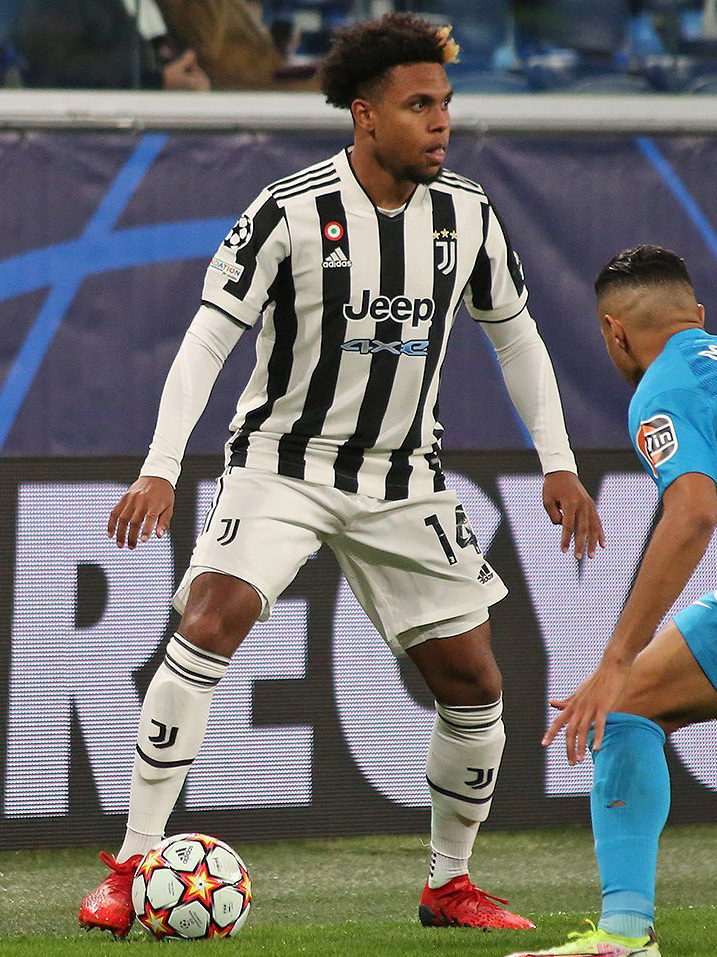
McKennie playing for Juventus in October 2021

==== 2020–2022 ====
On August 29, 2020, it was announced that McKennie joined Serie A side Juventus on a year-long loan. In doing so, he became Juventus' first player—and Serie A's fifth—from the United States. The move was structured as an initial year-long loan for a fee of €4.5 million, with an option to make the loan permanent at the end of the season. However, if McKennie met certain performance incentives, the option would automatically trigger, and the deal would become permanent. In both scenarios, the deal would be for €18.5 million, which could rise an additional €7 million. On September 7, McKennie had his introductory press conference and was given the number 14.

McKennie made his league debut for Juventus on September 20, starting and playing the full 90 minutes in a 3–0 league home win against Sampdoria. McKennie made his Champions League debut for the club in the second match of the group stage, coming on in the 75th minute of a 2–0 home defeat to Barcelona. On November 1, McKennie got on the score sheet for the first time for Juventus, earning an assist on the opening goal by Álvaro Morata in a 4–1 win against Spezia. On November 24, McKennie started a Champions League match against Ferencváros, becoming the first American international in Italy to do so. McKennie scored his first goal for Juventus on December 5, in the Derby della Mole against Torino; he scored the equalizer of the match, which eventually ended in a 2–1 win. Three days later, McKennie scored his first Champions League goal for Juventus—a scissor kick on the volley—against Barcelona, helping his team win 3–0 away from home and finish in first place in their group. On January 6, 2021, McKennie scored a goal against league-leaders Milan in a 3–1 away win; it was Milan's first league defeat in 27 games.

On March 3, 2021, Juventus exercised their purchase option for €18.5 million, plus €6.5 million in potential bonuses, on a four-year contract. McKennie started for Juventus in the Coppa Italia Final against Atalanta; he assisted Dejan Kulusevski for the team's first goal in an eventual 2–1 win. McKennie finished the 2020–21 season with six goals in 46 appearances in all competitions. McKennie scored his first goal of the season in a 2–1 loss to Sassuolo on October 27, and followed it up with a second goal in another 2–1 loss to Hellas Verona three days later.

On January 12, 2022, McKennie scored the opener in the 2021 Supercoppa Italiana match, which the team eventually lost 2–1 against Inter Milan. On February 22, in a Champions League game against Villarreal, McKennie injured his metatarsal following a foul by Pervis Estupiñán, forcing him to prematurely end his season.

==== Loan to Leeds United ====
On January 30, 2023, McKennie joined English side Leeds United on loan for the remainder of the 2022–23 season. He made his Leeds debut on February 5, 2023, as a second-half substitute in the Premier League 1–0 defeat to Nottingham Forest. He made 20 appearances for the team across all competitions, including 16 starts in the Premier League, but failed to score any goals before Leeds were ultimately relegated on the last day of the season.

==== 2023–present ====
After his Leeds loan, McKennie returned to the Juventus first team for the 2023–24 season and took the number 16. On September 16, 2023, he made his 100th appearance for Juventus, creating a long ball assist in the 3–1 victory over Lazio. Re-established as a starter in the Juventus midfield, on December 23 he created an assist in the 2–1 win over Frosinone.

On January 11, 2024, McKennie created two assists in the 4–0 victory over Frosinone in the 2023–24 Coppa Italia quarter-finals. On January 21 he recorded a league assist in the 3–0 victory over Lecce. On February 25, he repeated the same feat against Frosinone by creating two assists in league play. On March 10, he created two league assists in the 2–2 draw to Atalanta. On April 2, 2024, he recorded his season-record 10th assist (7th season league assist) against Lazio in the 2023–24 Coppa Italia semi-finals, helping them to the cup final. McKennie started in the 2024 Coppa Italia final and played the full 90 minutes, where Juventus won 1–0 and he secured his second Coppa Italia trophy. On August 22, 2024, McKennie extended his contract with Juventus until 2026. On September 17, he scored in the club's opening UEFA Champions League game, a 3–1 win over PSV. On October 27, he recorded two assists in the 4–4 draw with Inter Milan. In the following game on October 30, he scored in the 2–2 draw against Parma. On December 11, he scored a volley goal in the 2–0 win over Manchester City in the Champions League group stage. On February 11, in the Champions League knockout phase, he scored against PSV again winning 2–1.

For the 2025–26 season, McKennie again changed his number to 22 in respect to his teammate Michele Di Gregorio whose late father was fond of his previous 16 number. January 22, 2026 saw him scoring in three consecutive Champions League games in a row after the 2–0 win over Benfica. He was named the Juventus Player of the Month for January with three goals. On February 6, he scored against Lazio, marking his best goalscoring season to date with 7 goals. On February 14, he created two assists in the 2–3 loss to rivals Inter. On February 25, McKennie scored a late aggregate equalizer in the second leg win against Galatasaray to break his best ever Champions League season with four goals, though Juventus would ultimately be eliminated by aggregate in extra time. His goal also made him only one goal away (11) from the American all-time Champions League goalscoring leader Christian Pulisic (12), and only the third Juventus midfielder to score 10+ career Champions League goals, with Pavel Nedvěd (11) and Michel Platini (17).

On March 2, 2026, McKennie agreed to a new contract with Juventus that will keep him at the club until 2030. He ended his highest goalscoring season with nine goals and eight assists across all competitions. For his performances, McKennie was named on the 2025–26 Serie A Team of the Season.

== International career ==
=== 2013–2016: Youth level ===
McKennie has played with various United States youth teams, including the under-17 and under-20 national teams.

=== 2017–2019: Senior debut and first CONCACAF Gold Cup ===
McKennie earned his first senior team callup for the United States' friendly against Portugal on November 14, 2017, scoring on his debut. McKennie's first international assist came in the opening game of the 2019 CONCACAF Gold Cup against Guyana at Allianz Field in a 4–0 win. McKennie scored the lone goal for the U.S. on June 30, 2019, to help them secure a 1–0 win in the Gold Cup quarter-finals against Curaçao. McKennie notched his second goal in the semi-finals against Jamaica in the 19th minute.

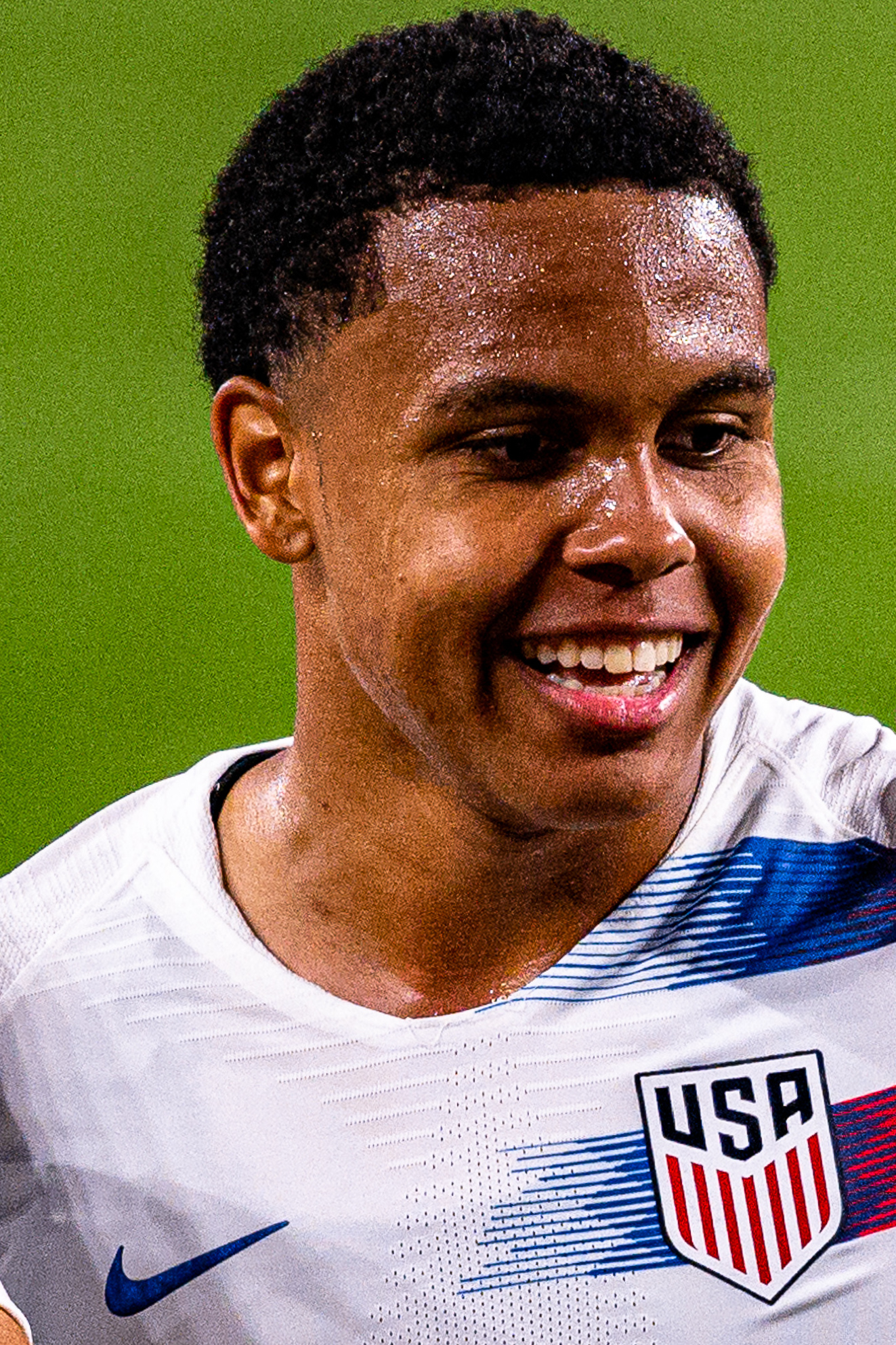
McKennie playing for United States against Trinidad and Tobago in 2019.

=== 2019–2022: CONCACAF Nations League Finals and first FIFA World Cup ===
On October 12, 2019, McKennie scored the fastest hat-trick in the U.S. men's national team's history, scoring three goals in thirteen minutes in a CONCACAF Nations League game against Cuba.

On June 6, 2021, McKennie scored a decisive 2–2 equalizer in the 2021 CONCACAF Nations League Final against rivals Mexico, bringing the game to extra time. The game ultimately ended 3–2 to the United States, and McKennie was nominated Player of the Tournament. On September 7, 2021, during the final round of 2022 FIFA World Cup qualifying, McKennie was dropped from the national team for breaking COVID-19 team protocols by bringing a guest into his hotel room while the team was in Nashville, Tennessee, for their match against Canada. As a result, he missed the final two matches of the series.

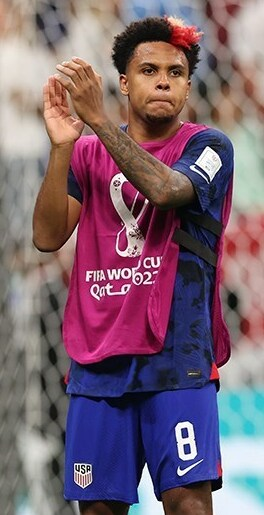
McKennie with the United States at the 2022 FIFA World Cup.

=== 2023: CONCACAF Nations League Finals ===
McKennie won the 2023 CONCACAF Nations League against Canada and the 2024 CONCACAF Nations League against Mexico, where he assisted Tyler Adams for the opening goal in the final.

=== 2026–present: Second FIFA World Cup ===
On May 26, 2026, McKennie was selected in the 26-man squad for the 2026 FIFA World Cup.

== Player profile ==
=== Style of play ===
McKennie is known for his versatility as a player. During his time at Schalke, McKennie played in numerous positions including in midfield, as a center-back, full-back, and even as a striker. In addition, he is an often-utilized proponent of the long throw-in, deploying an unorthodox sideways wind-up technique prior to launching. However, he has primarily played as either a box-to-box midfielder or in a deeper-lying defensive role. During his time with Juventus, he has been used in several midfield positions, including as a wide midfielder, in a holding role, or even as a more offensive-minded central midfielder, known as the mezzala role in Italian soccer jargon.

McKennie's primary attributes are his defensive skills and work rate, as well as his ability to win back the ball. Furthermore, his passing allows him to dictate the flow of the game and push the ball forward from deep-lying positions in midfield.

=== Reception ===
His ball-winning qualities, combined with his positioning, tactical intelligence, eye for goal from midfield, and ability to make late attacking runs into the box led Alberto Mauro of Il Messaggero to compare him to former Juventus midfielders Edgar Davids and Arturo Vidal; McKennie's technical ability was cited as an area in need of improvement, however.

== Personal life ==
McKennie has been a fan of the Wizarding World since first reading a Harry Potter book at the age of six. He has a Harry Potter lightning bolt tattoo, and his signature goal celebration involves waving his hand as if using a wand to cast a spell.

== Career statistics ==
=== Club ===
As of match played November 22, 2026

Appearances and goals by club, season and competition
Club	Season	League			National cup (Note: Includes DFB-Pokal, Coppa Italia, FA Cup)		Continental		Other		Total	
Club	Season	Division	Apps	Goals	Apps	Goals	Apps	Goals	Apps	Goals	Apps	Goals
Schalke 04	2016–17	Bundesliga	1	0	—		—		—		1	0
Schalke 04	2017–18	Bundesliga	22	0	3	0	—		—		25	0
Schalke 04	2018–19	Bundesliga	24	1	3	0	6 (Note: Appearances in UEFA Champions League)	1	—		33	2
Schalke 04	2019–20	Bundesliga	28	3	4	0	—		—		32	3
Schalke 04	Total		75	4	10	0	6	1	—		91	5
Juventus	2020–21 (Note: Part of this season was spent on loan from Schalke 04)	Serie A	34	5	4	0	7	1	1 (Note: Appearance in Supercoppa Italiana)	0	46	6
Juventus	2021–22	Serie A	21	3	1	0	6	0	1	1	29	4
Juventus	2022–23	Serie A	15	1	1	0	5	2	—		21	3
Juventus	2023–24	Serie A	34	0	4	0	—		—		38	0
Juventus	2024–25	Serie A	32	2	2	0	9	3	5 (Note: One appearance in Supercoppa Italiana, four appearances in FIFA Club World Cup)	0	48	5
Juventus	2025–26	Serie A	36	5	2	0	10	4	—		48	9
Juventus	2026–27	Serie A	9	1	0	0	3 (Note: Appearances in UEFA Europa League)	0	—		12	1
Juventus	Total		181	17	14	0	40	10	7	1	242	28
Leeds United (loan)	2022–23	Premier League	19	0	1	0	—		—		20	0
Career total			275	21	25	0	46	11	7	1	353	33

=== International ===
As of match played November 17, 2026

Appearances and goals by national team and year
National team	Year	Apps	Goals
United States	2017	1	1
United States	2018	6	0
United States	2019	12	5
United States	2020	2	0
United States	2021	7	2
United States	2022	13	1
United States	2023	8	2
United States	2024	9	0
United States	2025	4	0
United States	2026	11	2
Total		73	13

Scores and results list the United States' goal tally first, score column indicates score after each McKennie goal.

List of international goals scored by Weston McKennie
No.	Date	Venue	Opponent	Score	Result	Competition
1	November 14, 2017	Estádio Dr. Magalhães Pessoa, Leiria, Portugal	Portugal	1–0	1–1	Friendly
2	June 30, 2019	Lincoln Financial Field, Philadelphia, United States	Curaçao	1–0	1–0	2019 CONCACAF Gold Cup
3	July 3, 2019	Nissan Stadium, Nashville, United States	Jamaica	1–0	3–1	2019 CONCACAF Gold Cup
4	October 11, 2019	Audi Field, Washington, D.C., United States	Cuba	1–0	7–0	2019–20 CONCACAF Nations League A
5	October 11, 2019	Audi Field, Washington, D.C., United States	Cuba	2–0	7–0	2019–20 CONCACAF Nations League A
6	October 11, 2019	Audi Field, Washington, D.C., United States	Cuba	4–0	7–0	2019–20 CONCACAF Nations League A
7	June 6, 2021	Empower Field at Mile High, Denver, United States	Mexico	2–2	3–2 (a.e.t.)	2021 CONCACAF Nations League Finals
8	November 12, 2021	TQL Stadium, Cincinnati, United States	Mexico	2–0	2–0	2022 FIFA World Cup qualification
9	February 2, 2022	Allianz Field, Saint Paul, United States	Honduras	1–0	3–0	2022 FIFA World Cup qualification
10	March 24, 2023	Kirani James Athletic Stadium, St. George's, Grenada	Grenada	3–0	7–1	2022–23 CONCACAF Nations League A
11	March 24, 2023	Kirani James Athletic Stadium, St. George's, Grenada	Grenada	4–1	7–1	2022–23 CONCACAF Nations League A
12	March 28, 2026	Mercedes-Benz Stadium, Atlanta, United States	Belgium	1–0	2–5	Friendly
13	November 14, 2026	Nu Stadium, Miami, United States	Haiti	5–0	6–0	2026–27 CONCACAF Nations League A

== Honors ==
Juventus

- Coppa Italia: 2020–21, 2023–24
- Supercoppa Italiana: 2020

United States

- CONCACAF Nations League: 2019–20, 2022–23, 2023–24
- CONCACAF Gold Cup runner-up: 2019

Individual

- CONCACAF Nations League Best Player: 2019–20
- U.S. Soccer Player of the Year: 2020
- IFFHS Men's CONCACAF Team of the Year: 2020, 2024, 2025
- CONCACAF Awards Best XI: 2021
- CONCACAF Nations League Finals Best XI: 2021, 2024
- EA Sports FC Serie A Team of the Season: 2025–26
