= United States men's national soccer team results =

These are the United States men's national soccer team all time results:

== Results ==
=== 1916–1929 ===
11 matches played:
5 Wins, 4 Losses, 2 Draws

1916–1929
Win Draw Defeat
M	Opponent	Date	Location	Result	Event
1	Sweden	August 20, 1916	Stockholm Olympic Stadium, Stockholm, Sweden	3–2	(Sweden) Friendly
2	Norway	September 3, 1916	Frogner Stadion, Oslo, Norway	1–1	(Norway) Friendly
3	Estonia	May 25, 1924	Stade Pershing, Paris, France	1–0	(France) 1924 Summer Olympics R32
4	Uruguay	May 29, 1924	Stade Bergeyre, Paris, France	0–3	(France) 1924 Summer Olympics R16
5	Poland	June 10, 1924	Agrykola, Warsaw, Poland	3–2	(Poland) Friendly
6	Irish Free State	June 16, 1924	(Irish Free State) Dublin, Ireland	1–3	(Republic of Ireland) Friendly
7	Canada	June 27, 1925	Alexandra Park, Montreal, Canada	0–1	(Canada) Friendly
8	Canada	November 8, 1925	(United States) Ebbets Field, New York City, New York	6–1	(United States) Friendly
9	Canada	November 6, 1926	(United States) Ebbets Field, New York City, New York	6–2	(United States) Friendly
10	Argentina	May 29, 1928	Amsterdam Olympic Stadium, Amsterdam, Netherlands	2–11	(Netherlands) 1928 Summer Olympics R16
11	Poland	June 10, 1928	Agrykola, Warsaw, Poland	3–3	(Poland) Friendly

=== 1930–1949 ===
18 matches played:
5 Wins, 13 Losses, 1 Draw

1930–1949
Win Draw Defeat
M	Opponent	Date	Location	Result	Event
12	Belgium	July 13, 1930	Estadio Gran Parque Central, Montevideo, Uruguay	3–0	(Uruguay) World Cup GS
13	Paraguay	July 17, 1930	Estadio Gran Parque Central, Montevideo, Uruguay	3–0	(Uruguay) World Cup GS
14	Argentina	July 26, 1930	Estadio Centenario, Montevideo, Uruguay	1–6	(Uruguay) World Cup SF
15	Brazil	August 17, 1930	Estádio de Laranjeiras, Rio de Janeiro, Brazil	3–4	(Brazil) Friendly
16	Mexico	May 24, 1934	Stadio Nazionale PNF, Rome, Italy	4–2	(Italy) World Cup Q
17	Italy	May 27, 1934	Stadio Nazionale PNF, Rome, Italy	1–7	(Italy) World Cup 1R
18	Italy	August 3, 1936	Berlin Poststadion, Berlin, Germany	0–1	(Germany) 1936 Summer Olympics 1R
19	Mexico	September 12, 1937	Parque Asturias, Mexico City, Mexico	2–7	(Mexico) Friendly
20	Mexico	September 19, 1937	Parque Necaxa, Mexico City, Mexico	3–7	(Mexico) Friendly
21	Mexico	September 26, 1937	Parque España, Mexico City, Mexico	1–5	(Mexico) Friendly
22	Mexico	July 13, 1947	Gran Stadium Cervecería Tropical, Havana, Cuba	0–5	(Cuba) North American Championship
23	Cuba	July 20, 1947	Gran Stadium Cervecería Tropical, Havana, Cuba	2–5	(Cuba) North American Championship
24	Norway	August 6, 1948	Ullevaal Stadion, Oslo, Norway	0–11	(Norway) Friendly
25	Northern Ireland	August 11, 1948	Windsor Park, Belfast, Northern Ireland	0–5	(Northern Ireland) Friendly
26	Israel	September 26, 1948	(United States) Triborough Stadium, New York City, New York	3–1	(United States) Friendly
27	Mexico	September 4, 1949	Mexico Estadio Ciudad de los Deportes, Mexico City, Mexico	0–6	(Mexico) North American Championship; World Cup Q
28	Cuba	September 14, 1949	Mexico Estadio Ciudad de los Deportes, Mexico City, Mexico	1–1	(Mexico) North American Championship; World Cup Q
29	Mexico	September 18, 1949	Mexico Estadio Ciudad de los Deportes, Mexico City, Mexico	2–6	(Mexico) North American Championship; World Cup Q
30	Cuba	September 21, 1949	Mexico Estadio Ciudad de los Deportes, Mexico City, Mexico	5–2	(Mexico) North American Championship; World Cup Q

=== 1950–1959 ===
17 matches played:
3 Wins, 14 Losses, 0 Draws

1950–1959
Win Draw Defeat
M	Opponent	Date	Result	Location	Event
31	Spain	June 25, 1950	1–3	Estádio Vila Capanema, Curitiba, Brazil	(Brazil) World Cup GS
32	England	June 29, 1950	1–0	Estádio Independência, Belo Horizonte, Brazil	(Brazil) World Cup GS
33	Chile	July 2, 1950	2–5	Estádio Ilha do Retiro, Recife, Brazil	(Brazil) World Cup GS
34	Scotland	April 30, 1952	0–5	(United Kingdom) Hampden Park, Glasgow, Scotland	(Scotland) Friendly
35	Italy	July 16, 1952	0–8	Ratina Stadion, Tampere, Finland	(Finland) 1952 Summer Olympics
36	England	June 8, 1953	3–6	(United States) Yankee Stadium, New York City, New York	(United States) Friendly
37	Mexico	January 10, 1954	0–4	Estadio Olímpico de los Deportes, Mexico City, Mexico	(Mexico) World Cup Q
38	Mexico	January 14, 1954	1–3	Estadio Olímpico de los Deportes, Mexico City, Mexico	(Mexico) World Cup Q
39	Haiti	March 3, 1954	3–2	Stade Sylvio Cator, Port-au-Prince, Haiti	(Haiti) World Cup Q
40	Haiti	March 4, 1954	3–0	Stade Sylvio Cator, Port-au-Prince, Haiti	(Haiti) World Cup Q
41	Iceland	August 25, 1955	2–3	Melavöllur, Reykjavik, Iceland	(Iceland) Friendly
42	Yugoslavia	November 28, 1956	0–8	Olympic Park Stadium, Melbourne, Australia	(Australia) 1956 Summer Olympics
43	Mexico	April 7, 1957	0–6	Estadio Olímpico Universitario, Mexico City, Mexico	(Mexico) World Cup Q
44	Mexico	April 28, 1957	2–7	(United States) Veterans Memorial Stadium, Long Beach, California	(United States) World Cup Q
45	Canada	June 22, 1957	1–5	Varsity Stadium, Toronto, Canada	(Canada) World Cup Q
46	Canada	July 6, 1957	2–3	(United States) Public School Ground, St. Louis, Missouri	(United States) World Cup Q
47	England	May 28, 1959	1–8	(United States) Wrigley Field, Los Angeles, California	(United States) Friendly

=== 1960–1969 ===
19 matches played:
5 Wins, 10 Losses, 4 Draws

1960–1969
Win Draw Defeat
M	Opponent	Date	Result	Event	
48	Mexico	November 6, 1960	3–3	(United States) Wrigley Field, Los Angeles, California	(United States) World Cup Q
49	Mexico	November 13, 1960	0–3	Mexico Estadio Olímpico Universitario, Mexico City, Mexico	(Mexico) World Cup Q
50	Colombia	February 5, 1961	0–2	Estadio Nemesio Camacho, Bogotá, Colombia	(Colombia) Friendly
51	England	May 27, 1964	0–10	(United States) Downing Stadium, New York City, New York	(United States) Friendly
52	Mexico	March 7, 1965	2–2	(United States) Los Angeles Memorial Coliseum, Los Angeles, California	(United States) World Cup Q
53	Mexico	March 12, 1965	0–2	Estadio Olímpico Universitario, Mexico City, Mexico	(Mexico) World Cup Q
54	Honduras	March 17, 1965	1–0	Estadio Francisco Morazán, San Pedro Sula, Honduras	(Honduras) World Cup Q
55	Honduras	March 21, 1965	1–1	Estadio Nacional, Tegucigalpa, Honduras	(Honduras) World Cup Q
56	Israel	September 15, 1968	3–3	(United States) Yankee Stadium, New York City, New York	(United States) Friendly
57	Israel	September 25, 1968	0–4	(United States) Temple Stadium, Philadelphia, Pennsylvania	(United States) Friendly
58	Canada	October 13, 1968	2–4	Varsity Stadium, Toronto, Canada	(Canada) World Cup Q
59	Haiti	October 20, 1968	6–3	Stade Sylvio Cator, Port-au-Prince, Haiti	(Haiti) Friendly
60	Haiti	October 21, 1968	2–5	Stade Sylvio Cator, Port-au-Prince, Haiti	(Haiti) Friendly
61	Haiti	October 23, 1968	0–1	Stade Sylvio Cator, Port-au-Prince, Haiti	(Haiti) Friendly
62	Canada	October 26, 1968	1–0	(United States) Atlanta–Fulton County Stadium, Atlanta, Georgia	(United States) World Cup Q
63	Bermuda	November 3, 1968	6–2	(United States) Municipal Stadium, Kansas City, Missouri	(United States) World Cup Q
64	Bermuda	November 11, 1968	2–0	Bermuda National Stadium, Hamilton, Bermuda	(Bermuda) World Cup Q
65	Haiti	April 20, 1969	0–2	Haiti Stade Sylvio Cator, Port-au-Prince, Haiti	(Haiti) World Cup Q
66	Haiti	May 11, 1969	0–1	(United States) San Diego Stadium, San Diego, California	(United States) World Cup Q

=== 1970–1979 ===
49 matches played:
9 Wins, 31 Losses, 9 Draws

1970–1979
Win Draw Defeat
M	Opponent	Date	Result	Location	Event
67	Canada	August 20, 1972	2–3	King George V Park, St. John's, Canada	(Canada) CONCACAF Champ. Q/World Cup Q
68	Canada	August 29, 1972	2–2	Memorial Stadium, Baltimore, Maryland	(United States) CONCACAF Champ. Q/World Cup Q
69	Mexico	September 3, 1972	1–3	Estadio Azteca, Mexico City, Mexico	(Mexico) CONCACAF Champ. Q/World Cup Q
70	Mexico	September 10, 1972	1–2	Los Angeles Memorial Coliseum, Los Angeles, California	(United States) CONCACAF Champ. Q/World Cup Q
71	Bermuda	March 17, 1973	0–4	National Stadium, Hamilton, Bermuda	(Bermuda) Friendly
72	Poland	March 20, 1973	0–4	Stadion ŁKS, Łódź, Poland	(Poland) Friendly
73	Poland	August 3, 1973	0–1	Soldier Field, Chicago, Illinois	(United States) Friendly
74	Canada	August 5, 1973	2–0	Windsor Stadium, Windsor, Canada	(Canada) Friendly
75	Poland	August 10, 1973	0–4	Candlestick Park, San Francisco, California	(United States) Friendly
76	Poland	August 12, 1973	1–0	Willow Brook Park Stadium, New Britain, Connecticut	(United States) Friendly
77	Bermuda	September 9, 1973	1–0	Dillon Stadium, Hartford, Connecticut	(United States) Friendly
78	Mexico	October 16, 1973	0–2	Estadio Azteca, Mexico City, Mexico	(Mexico) Friendly
79	Haiti	November 3, 1973	0–1	Stade Sylvio Cator, Port-au-Prince, Haiti	(Haiti) Friendly
80	Haiti	November 5, 1973	0–1	Stade Sylvio Cator, Port-au-Prince, Haiti	(Haiti) Friendly
81	Israel	November 13, 1973	1–3	Bloomfield Stadium, Tel Aviv, Israel	(Israel) Friendly
82	Israel	November 15, 1973	0–2	Municipal Stadium, Beersheba, Israel	(Israel) Friendly
83	Mexico	September 5, 1974	1–3	Estadio Universitario, Monterrey, Mexico	(Mexico) Friendly
84	Mexico	September 8, 1974	0–1	Texas Stadium, Irving, Texas	(United States) Friendly
85	Poland	March 26, 1975	0–7	Warta Stadion, Poznań, Poland	(Poland) Friendly
86	Poland	June 24, 1975	0–4	Memorial Stadium, Seattle, Washington	(United States) Friendly
87	Costa Rica	August 19, 1975	1–3	Estadio Azteca, Mexico City, Mexico	Mexico City Tournament
88	Argentina	August 21, 1975	0–6	Estadio Azteca, Mexico City, Mexico	Mexico City Tournament
89	Mexico	August 24, 1975	0–2	Estadio Azteca, Mexico City, Mexico	Mexico City Tournament
90	Canada	September 24, 1976	1–1	Empire Stadium, Vancouver, Canada	(Canada) CONCACAF Champ. Q/World Cup Q
91	Mexico	October 3, 1976	0–0	Memorial Coliseum, Los Angeles, California	(United States) CONCACAF Champ. Q/World Cup Q
92	Mexico	October 15, 1976	0–3	Estadio Cuauhtémoc, Puebla, Mexico	(Mexico) CONCACAF Champ. Q/World Cup Q
93	Canada	October 20, 1976	2–0	Kingdome, Seattle, Washington	(United States) CONCACAF Champ. Q/World Cup Q
94	Haiti	November 10, 1976	0–0	Stade Sylvio Cator, Port-au-Prince, Haiti	(Haiti) Friendly
95	Haiti	November 12, 1976	0–0	Stade Sylvio Cator, Port-au-Prince, Haiti	(Haiti) Friendly
96	Haiti	November 14, 1976	0–0	Stade Sylvio Cator, Port-au-Prince, Haiti	(Haiti) Friendly
97	Canada	December 22, 1976	0–3	Stade Sylvio Cator, Port-au-Prince, Haiti	(Haiti) CONCACAF Champ. Q/World Cup Q
98	El Salvador	September 15, 1977	2–1	Estadio Cuscatlán, San Salvador, El Salvador	(El Salvador) Friendly
99	Guatemala	September 18, 1977	1–3	Estadio Mateo Flores, Guatemala City, Guatemala	(Guatemala) Friendly
100	Guatemala	September 25, 1977	0–2	Estadio Mateo Flores, Guatemala City, Guatemala	(Guatemala) Friendly
101	Mexico	September 27, 1977	0–3	Estadio Universitario, Monterrey, Mexico	(Mexico) Friendly
102	El Salvador	September 30, 1977	0–0	ELAC Stadium, Monterey Park, California	(United States) Friendly
103	China	October 6, 1977	1–1	RFK Stadium, Washington, D.C.	(United States) Friendly
104	China	October 10, 1977	1–0	Atlanta–Fulton County Stadium, Atlanta, Georgia	(United States) Friendly
105	China	October 16, 1977	2–1	Kezar Stadium, San Francisco, California	(United States) Friendly
106	Iceland	September 3, 1978	0–0	Laugardalsvöllur, Reykjavík, Iceland	(Iceland) Friendly
107	Switzerland	September 6, 1978	0–2	Stadion Allmend, Lucerne, Switzerland	(Switzerland) Friendly
108	Portugal	September 20, 1978	0–1	Estádio do Bonfim, Setúbal, Portugal	(Portugal) Friendly
109	Soviet Union	February 3, 1979	1–3	Kingdome, Seattle, Washington	(United States) Friendly
110	Soviet Union	February 11, 1979	1–4	Candlestick Park, San Francisco, California	(United States) Friendly
111	France	May 2, 1979	0–5	Giants Stadium, East Rutherford, New Jersey	(United States) Friendly
112	Bermuda	July 10, 1979	3–1	National Stadium, Hamilton, Bermuda	(Bermuda) Friendly
113	France	October 10, 1979	0–3	Parc des Princes, Paris, France	(France) Friendly
114	Hungary	October 26, 1979	2–0	Népstadion, Budapest, Hungary	(Hungary) Friendly
115	Republic of Ireland	October 29, 1979	2–3	Dalymount Park, Dublin, Ireland	(Republic of Ireland) Friendly

=== 1980–1989 ===
55 matches played:
19 Wins, 19 Losses, 17 Draws

1980–1989
Win Draw Defeat
M	Opponent	Date	Result	Event
116	Luxembourg	October 4, 1980	2–0	(Luxembourg) Friendly
117	Portugal	October 7, 1980	1–1	(Portugal) Friendly
118	CanadaЦунг	October 25, 1980	0–0	(United States) CONCACAF Champ. Q/World Cup Q
119	Canada	November 1, 1980	1–2	(Canada) CONCACAF Champ. Q/World Cup Q
120	Mexico	November 9, 1980	1–5	(Mexico) CONCACAF Champ. Q/World Cup Q
121	Mexico	November 23, 1980	2–1	(United States) CONCACAF Champ. Q/World Cup Q
122	Trinidad and Tobago	March 21, 1982	2–1	(Trinidad and Tobago) Friendly
123	Haiti	April 8, 1983	2–0	(Haiti) Friendly
124	Italy	May 30, 1984	0–0	(United States) Friendly
125	Netherlands Antilles	September 29, 1984	0–0	(Netherlands Antilles) CONCACAF Champ. Q/World Cup Q
126	Netherlands Antilles	October 6, 1984	4–0	(United States) CONCACAF Champ. Q/World Cup Q
127	El Salvador	October 9, 1984	3–1	(United States) Friendly
128	Colombia	October 11, 1984	1–0	(United States) Friendly
129	Guatemala	October 14, 1984	0–4	(Guatemala) Friendly
130	Mexico	October 17, 1984	1–2	(Mexico) Friendly
131	Ecuador	November 30, 1984	0–0	(United States) Friendly
132	Ecuador	December 2, 1984	2–2	(United States) Friendly
133	Switzerland	February 8, 1985	1–1	(United States) Friendly
134	Canada	April 2, 1985	0–2	(Canada) Friendly
135	Canada	April 4, 1985	1–1	(United States) Friendly
136	Trinidad and Tobago	May 14, 1985	2–1	(United States) CONCACAF Champ./World Cup Q
137	Trinidad and Tobago	May 19, 1985	1–0	(United States) CONCACAF Champ./World Cup Q
138	Costa Rica	May 26, 1985	1–1	(Costa Rica) CONCACAF Champ./World Cup Q
139	Costa Rica	May 31, 1985	0–1	(United States) CONCACAF Champ./World Cup Q
140	England	June 16, 1985	0–5	(United States) Friendly
141	Canada	February 5, 1986	0–0	(United States) Miami Cup
142	Uruguay	February 7, 1986	1–1	(United States) Miami Cup
143	Egypt	June 8, 1987	1–3	(South Korea) President's Cup
144	South Korea	June 12, 1987	0–1	(South Korea) President's Cup
145	Thailand	June 16, 1987	1–0	(South Korea) President's Cup
146	Guatemala	January 10, 1988	0–1	(Guatemala) Friendly
147	Guatemala	January 13, 1988	1–0	(Guatemala) Friendly
148	Colombia	May 14, 1988	0–2	(United States) Friendly
149	Chile	June 1, 1988	1–1	(United States) Friendly
150	Chile	June 3, 1988	1–3	(United States) Friendly
151	Chile	June 5, 1988	0–3	(United States) Friendly
152	Ecuador	June 7, 1988	0–1	(United States) Friendly
153	Ecuador	June 10, 1988	0–2	(United States) Friendly
154	Ecuador	June 12, 1988	0–0	(United States) Friendly
155	Costa Rica	June 14, 1988	1–0	(United States) Friendly
156	Poland	July 13, 1988	0–2	(United States) Friendly
157	Jamaica	July 24, 1988	0–0	(Jamaica) CONCACAF Champ. Q/World Cup Q
158	Jamaica	August 13, 1988	5–1	(United States) CONCACAF Champ. Q/World Cup Q
159	Costa Rica	April 16, 1989	0–1	(Costa Rica) CONCACAF Champ./World Cup Q
160	Costa Rica	April 30, 1989	1–0	(United States) CONCACAF Champ./World Cup Q
161	Trinidad and Tobago	May 13, 1989	1–1	(United States) CONCACAF Champ./World Cup Q
162	Peru	June 4, 1989	3–0	(United States) Friendly
163	Guatemala	June 17, 1989	2–1	(United States) CONCACAF Champ./World Cup Q
164	Colombia	June 24, 1989	0–1	(United States) Friendly
165	South Korea	August 13, 1989	1–2	(United States) Friendly
166	El Salvador	September 17, 1989	1–0	(Honduras) CONCACAF Champ./World Cup Q
167	Guatemala	October 8, 1989	0–0	(Guatemala) CONCACAF Champ./World Cup Q
168	El Salvador	November 5, 1989	0–0	(United States) CONCACAF Champ./World Cup Q
169	Bermuda	November 14, 1989	2–1	(United States) Friendly
170	Trinidad and Tobago	November 19, 1989	1–0	(Trinidad and Tobago) CONCACAF Champ./World Cup Q

=== 1990–1999 ===
198 matches played:
71 Wins, 75 Losses, 52 Draws

1990–1999
Win Draw Defeat
M	Opponent	Date	Result	Event
171	Costa Rica	February 2, 1990	0–2	(United States) Miami Cup
172	Colombia	February 4, 1990	1–1	(United States) Miami Cup
173	Bermuda	February 13, 1990	1–0	(Bermuda) Friendly
174	Soviet Union	February 24, 1990	1–3	(United States) Friendly
175	Finland	March 10, 1990	2–1	(United States) Friendly
176	Hungary	March 20, 1990	0–2	(Hungary) Friendly
177	East Germany	March 28, 1990	2–3	(East Germany) Friendly
178	Iceland	April 8, 1990	4–1	(United States) Friendly
179	Colombia	April 22, 1990	0–1	(United States) Friendly
180	Malta	May 5, 1990	1–0	(United States) Friendly
181	Poland	May 9, 1990	3–1	(United States) Friendly
182	Liechtenstein	May 30, 1990	4–1	(Liechtenstein) Friendly
183	Switzerland	June 2, 1990	1–2	(Switzerland) Friendly
184	Czechoslovakia	June 10, 1990	1–5	(Italy) World Cup GS
185	Italy	June 14, 1990	0–1	(Italy) World Cup GS
186	Austria	June 19, 1990	1–2	(Italy) World Cup GS
187	East Germany	July 28, 1990	1–2	(United States) Friendly
188	Trinidad and Tobago	September 15, 1990	3–0	(United States) Friendly
189	Poland	October 10, 1990	3–2	(Poland) Friendly
190	Croatia	October 17, 1990	1–2	(Croatia) Friendly
191	Trinidad and Tobago	November 18, 1990	0–0	(Trinidad and Tobago) Trinidad Tournament
192	Soviet Union	November 21, 1990	0–0	(Trinidad and Tobago) Trinidad Tournament
193	Portugal	December 19, 1990	0–1	(Portugal) Friendly
194	Switzerland	February 1, 1991	0–1	(United States) Miami Cup
195	Bermuda	February 21, 1991	0–1	(Bermuda) Friendly
196	Mexico	March 12, 1991	2–2	(United States) North American Nations Cup
197	Canada	March 16, 1991	2–0	(United States) North American Nations Cup
198	Uruguay	May 5, 1991	1–0	(United States) Friendly
199	Argentina	May 19, 1991	0–1	(United States) Friendly
200	Republic of Ireland	June 1, 1991	1–1	(United States) Friendly
201	Trinidad and Tobago	June 29, 1991	2–1	(United States) Gold Cup GS
202	Guatemala	July 1, 1991	3–0	(United States) Gold Cup GS
203	Costa Rica	July 3, 1991	3–2	(United States) Gold Cup GS
204	Mexico	July 5, 1991	2–0	(United States) Gold Cup SF
205	Honduras	July 7, 1991	0(4)–0(3)	(United States) Gold Cup F
206	Romania	August 28, 1991	2–0	(Romania) Friendly
207	Turkey	September 4, 1991	1–1	(Turkey) Friendly
208	Jamaica	September 14, 1991	1–0	(United States) Friendly
209	North Korea	October 19, 1991	1–2	(United States) Friendly
210	Costa Rica	November 24, 1991	1–1	(United States) Friendly
211	CIS	January 25, 1992	0–1	(United States) Friendly
212	CIS	February 2, 1992	2–1	(United States) Friendly
213	Costa Rica	February 12, 1992	0–0	(Costa Rica) Friendly
214	El Salvador	February 19, 1992	0–2	(El Salvador) Friendly
215	Brazil	February 26, 1992	0–3	(Brazil) Friendly
216	Spain	March 11, 1992	0–2	(Spain) Friendly
217	Morocco	March 18, 1992	1–3	(Morocco) Friendly
218	China	April 4, 1992	5–0	(United States) Friendly
219	Republic of Ireland	April 29, 1992	1–4	(Republic of Ireland) Friendly
220	Scotland	May 17, 1992	0–1	(United States) Friendly
221	Republic of Ireland	May 30, 1992	3–1	(United States) U.S. Cup
222	Portugal	June 3, 1992	1–0	(United States) U.S. Cup
223	Italy	June 6, 1992	1–1	(United States) U.S. Cup
224	Australia	June 13, 1992	0–1	(United States) Friendly
225	Ukraine	June 27, 1992	0–0	(United States) Friendly
226	Colombia	July 31, 1992	0–1	(United States) Friendship Cup
227	Brazil	August 2, 1992	0–1	(United States) Friendship Cup
228	Canada	September 3, 1992	2–0	(Canada) Friendly
229	Canada	October 9, 1992	0–0	(United States) Friendly
230	Saudi Arabia	October 15, 1992	0–3	(Saudi Arabia) Confederations Cup SF
231	Ivory Coast	October 19, 1992	5–2	(Saudi Arabia) Confederations Cup 3PG
232	Denmark	January 30, 1993	2–2	(United States) Friendly
233	Romania	February 6, 1993	1–1	(United States) Friendly
234	Russia	February 13, 1993	0–1	(United States) Friendly
235	Russia	February 21, 1993	0–0	(United States) Friendly
236	Canada	March 3, 1993	2–2	(United States) Friendly
237	Hungary	March 10, 1993	0–0	(Japan) Kirin Cup
238	Japan	March 14, 1993	1–3	(Japan) Kirin Cup
239	El Salvador	March 23, 1993	2–2	(El Salvador) Friendly
240	Honduras	March 25, 1993	1–4	(Honduras) Friendly
241	Saudi Arabia	April 9, 1993	2–0	(Saudi Arabia) Friendly
242	Iceland	April 17, 1993	1–1	(United States) Friendly
243	Colombia	May 8, 1993	1–2	(United States) Friendly
244	Bolivia	May 23, 1993	0–0	(United States) Friendly
245	Peru	May 26, 1993	0–0	(United States) Friendly
246	Brazil	June 6, 1993	0–2	(United States) U.S. Cup
247	England	June 9, 1993	2–0	(United States) U.S. Cup
248	Germany	June 13, 1993	3–4	(United States) U.S. Cup
249	Uruguay	June 16, 1993	0–1	(Ecuador) Copa América GS
250	Ecuador	June 19, 1993	0–2	(Ecuador) Copa América GS
251	Venezuela	June 22, 1993	3–3	(Ecuador) Copa América GS
252	Jamaica	July 10, 1993	1–0	(United States) Gold Cup GS
253	Panama	July 14, 1993	2–1	(United States) Gold Cup GS
254	Honduras	July 17, 1993	1–0	(United States) Gold Cup GS
255	Costa Rica	July 21, 1993	1–0	(United States) Gold Cup SF
256	Mexico	July 25, 1993	0–4	(Mexico) Gold Cup F
257	Iceland	August 31, 1993	1–0	(Iceland) Friendly
258	Norway	September 8, 1993	0–1	(Norway) Friendly
259	Mexico	October 13, 1993	1–1	(United States) Friendly
260	Ukraine	October 16, 1993	1–2	(United States) Friendly
261	Ukraine	October 23, 1993	0–1	(United States) Friendly
262	Jamaica	November 7, 1993	1–0	(United States) Friendly
263	Cayman Islands	November 14, 1993	8–1	(United States) Friendly
264	El Salvador	December 5, 1993	7–0	(United States) Friendly
265	Germany	December 18, 1993	0–3	(United States) Friendly
266	Norway	January 15, 1994	2–1	(United States) Friendly
267	Switzerland	January 22, 1994	1–1	(United States) Friendly
268	Russia	January 29, 1994	1–1	(United States) Friendly
269	Denmark	February 10, 1994	0(2)–0(4)	(Hong Kong) Carlsberg Cup SF
270	Romania	February 13, 1994	1–2	(Hong Kong) Carlsberg Cup 3PG
271	Bolivia	February 18, 1994	1–1	(United States) Joe Robbie Cup
272	Sweden	February 20, 1994	1–3	(United States) Joe Robbie Cup
273	South Korea	March 12, 1994	1–1	(United States) Friendly
274	Bolivia	March 26, 1994	2–2	(United States) Friendly
275	Moldova	April 16, 1994	1–1	(United States) Friendly
276	Moldova	April 20, 1994	3–0	(United States) Friendly
277	Iceland	April 24, 1994	1–2	(United States) Friendly
278	Chile	April 30, 1994	0–2	(United States) Friendly
279	Estonia	May 7, 1994	4–0	(United States) Friendly
280	Armenia	May 15, 1994	1–0	(United States) Friendly
281	Saudi Arabia	May 25, 1994	0–0	(United States) Friendly
282	Greece	May 28, 1994	1–1	(United States) Friendly
283	Mexico	June 4, 1994	1–0	(United States) Friendly
284	Switzerland	June 18, 1994	1–1	(United States) World Cup GS
285	Colombia	June 22, 1994	2–1	(United States) World Cup GS
286	Romania	June 26, 1994	0–1	(United States) World Cup GS
287	Brazil	July 4, 1994	0–1	(United States) World Cup R16
288	England	September 7, 1994	0–2	(England) Friendly
289	Saudi Arabia	October 19, 1994	1–2	(Saudi Arabia) Friendly
290	Trinidad and Tobago	November 19, 1994	0–1	(Trinidad and Tobago) Friendly
291	Jamaica	November 22, 1994	3–0	(Jamaica) Friendly
292	Honduras	December 11, 1994	1–1	(United States) Friendly
293	Uruguay	March 25, 1995	2–2	(United States) Friendly
294	Belgium	April 22, 1995	0–1	(Belgium) Friendly
295	Costa Rica	May 28, 1995	1–2	(United States) Friendly
296	Nigeria	June 11, 1995	3–2	(United States) U.S. Cup
297	Mexico	June 18, 1995	4–0	(United States) U.S. Cup
298	Colombia	June 25, 1995	0–0	(United States) U.S. Cup
299	Chile	July 8, 1995	2–1	(Uruguay) Copa América GS
300	Bolivia	July 11, 1995	0–1	(Uruguay) Copa América GS
301	Argentina	July 14, 1995	3–0	(Uruguay) Copa América GS
302	Mexico	July 17, 1995	0(4)–0(1)	(Uruguay) Copa América QF
303	Brazil	July 20, 1995	0–1	(Uruguay) Copa América SF
304	Colombia	July 22, 1995	1–4	(Uruguay) Copa América 3PG
305	Sweden	August 16, 1995	0–1	(Sweden) Friendly
306	Saudi Arabia	October 8, 1995	4–3	(United States) Friendly
307	Trinidad and Tobago	January 13, 1996	3–2	(United States) Gold Cup GS
308	El Salvador	January 16, 1996	2–0	(United States) Gold Cup GS
309	Brazil	January 18, 1996	0–1	(United States) Gold Cup SF
310	Guatemala	January 21, 1996	3–0	(United States) Gold Cup 3PG
311	Scotland	May 26, 1996	2–1	(United States) Friendly
312	Republic of Ireland	June 9, 1996	2–1	(United States) U.S. Cup
313	Bolivia	June 12, 1996	0–2	(United States) U.S. Cup
314	Mexico	June 16, 1996	2–2	(United States) U.S. Cup
315	El Salvador	August 30, 1996	3–1	(United States) Friendly
316	Peru	October 16, 1996	1–4	(Peru) Friendly
317	Guatemala	November 3, 1996	2–0	(United States) World Cup Q
318	Trinidad and Tobago	November 10, 1996	2–0	(United States) World Cup Q
319	Trinidad and Tobago	November 24, 1996	1–0	(Trinidad and Tobago) World Cup Q
320	Costa Rica	December 1, 1996	1–2	(Costa Rica) World Cup Q
321	Costa Rica	December 14, 1996	2–1	(United States) World Cup Q
322	Guatemala	December 21, 1996	2–2	(Guatemala) World Cup Q
323	Peru	January 17, 1997	0–1	(United States) U.S. Cup
324	Mexico	January 19, 1997	0–2	(United States) U.S. Cup
325	Denmark	January 22, 1997	1–4	(United States) U.S. Cup
326	China	January 29, 1997	1–2	(China) Friendly
327	China	February 1, 1997	1–1	(China) Friendly
328	Jamaica	March 2, 1997	0–0	(Jamaica) World Cup Q
329	Canada	March 16, 1997	3–0	(United States) World Cup Q
330	Costa Rica	March 23, 1997	2–3	(Costa Rica) World Cup Q
331	Mexico	April 20, 1997	2–2	(United States) World Cup Q
332	Paraguay	June 4, 1997	0–0	(United States) Friendly
333	Israel	June 17, 1997	2–1	(United States) Friendly
334	El Salvador	June 29, 1997	1–1	(El Salvador) World Cup Q
335	Ecuador	August 7, 1997	0–1	(United States) Friendly
336	Costa Rica	September 7, 1997	1–0	(United States) World Cup Q
337	Jamaica	October 3, 1997	1–1	(United States) World Cup Q
338	Mexico	November 2, 1997	0–0	(Mexico) World Cup Q
339	Canada	November 9, 1997	3–0	(Canada) World Cup Q
340	El Salvador	November 16, 1997	4–2	(United States) World Cup Q
341	Sweden	January 24, 1998	1–0	(United States) Friendly
342	Cuba	February 1, 1998	3–0	(United States) Gold Cup GS
343	Costa Rica	February 7, 1998	2–1	(United States) Gold Cup GS
344	Brazil	February 10, 1998	1–0	(United States) Gold Cup SF
345	Mexico	February 15, 1998	0–1	(United States) Gold Cup F
346	Netherlands	February 21, 1998	0–2	(United States) Friendly
347	Belgium	February 25, 1998	0–2	(Belgium) Friendly
348	Paraguay	March 14, 1998	2–2	(United States) Friendly
349	Austria	April 22, 1998	3–0	(Austria) Friendly
350	North Macedonia	May 16, 1998	0–0	(United States) Friendly
351	Kuwait	May 24, 1998	2–0	(United States) Friendly
352	Scotland	May 30, 1998	0–0	(United States) Friendly
353	Germany	June 15, 1998	0–2	(France) World Cup GS
354	Iran	June 21, 1998	1–2	(France) World Cup GS
355	FR Yugoslavia	June 25, 1998	0–1	(France) World Cup GS
356	Australia	November 6, 1998	0–0	(United States) Friendly
357	Bolivia	January 24, 1999	0–0	(Bolivia) Friendly
358	Germany	February 6, 1999	3–0	(United States) Friendly
359	Chile	February 21, 1999	2–1	(United States) Friendly
360	Guatemala	March 11, 1999	3–1	(United States) U.S. Cup
361	Mexico	March 13, 1999	1–2	(United States) U.S. Cup
362	Argentina	June 13, 1999	1–0	(United States) Friendly
363	New Zealand	July 24, 1999	2–1	(Mexico) Confederations Cup GS
364	Brazil	July 28, 1999	0–1	(Mexico) Confederations Cup GS
365	Germany	July 30, 1999	2–0	(Mexico) Confederations Cup GS
366	Mexico	August 1, 1999	0–1	(Mexico) Confederations Cup SF
367	Saudi Arabia	August 1, 1999	2–0	(Mexico) Confederations Cup 3PG
368	Jamaica	September 8, 1999	2–2	(Jamaica) Friendly
369	Morocco	November 17, 1999	1–2	(Morocco) Friendly

=== 2000–2009 ===
172 matches played:
98 Wins, 42 Losses, 32 Draws

2000–2009
Win Draw Defeat
M	Opponent	Date	Result	Event
370	Iran	January 16, 2000	1–1	(United States) Friendly
371	Chile	January 29, 2000	2–1	(Chile) Friendly
372	Haiti	February 12, 2000	3–0	(United States) Gold Cup GS
373	Peru	February 16, 2000	1–0	(United States) Gold Cup GS
374	Colombia	February 19, 2000	2(1)–2(2)	(United States) Gold Cup QF
375	Tunisia	March 12, 2000	1–1	(United States) Friendly
376	Russia	April 26, 2000	0–2	(Russia) Friendly
377	South Africa	June 3, 2000	4–0	(United States) U.S. Cup
378	Republic of Ireland	June 6, 2000	1–1	(United States) U.S. Cup
379	Mexico	June 11, 2000	3–0	(United States) U.S. Cup
380	Guatemala	July 16, 2000	1–1	(Guatemala) World Cup Q
381	Costa Rica	July 23, 2000	1–2	(Costa Rica) World Cup Q
382	Barbados	August 16, 2000	7–0	(United States) World Cup Q
383	Guatemala	September 3, 2000	1–0	(United States) World Cup Q
384	Costa Rica	October 11, 2000	0–0	(United States) World Cup Q
385	Mexico	October 25, 2000	2–0	(United States) Friendly
386	Barbados	November 15, 2000	4–0	(Barbados) World Cup Q
387	China	January 27, 2001	2–1	(United States) Friendly
388	Colombia	February 3, 2001	0–1	(United States) Friendly
389	Mexico	February 28, 2001	2–0	(United States) World Cup Q
390	Brazil	March 3, 2001	1–2	(United States) Friendly
391	Honduras	March 28, 2001	2–1	(Honduras) World Cup Q
392	Costa Rica	April 25, 2001	1–0	(United States) World Cup Q
393	Ecuador	June 7, 2001	0–0	(United States) Friendly
394	Jamaica	June 16, 2001	0–0	(Jamaica) World Cup Q
395	Trinidad and Tobago	June 20, 2001	2–0	(United States) World Cup Q
396	Mexico	July 1, 2001	0–1	(Mexico) World Cup Q
397	Honduras	September 1, 2001	2–3	(United States) World Cup Q
398	Costa Rica	September 5, 2001	0–2	(Costa Rica) World Cup Q
399	Jamaica	October 7, 2001	2–1	(United States) World Cup Q
400	Trinidad and Tobago	November 11, 2001	0–0	(Trinidad and Tobago) World Cup Q
401	South Korea	December 9, 2001	0–1	(South Korea) Friendly
402	South Korea	January 19, 2002	2–1	(United States) Gold Cup GS
403	Cuba	January 21, 2002	1–0	(United States) Gold Cup GS
404	El Salvador	January 27, 2002	4–0	(United States) Gold Cup QF
405	Canada	January 30, 2002	0(4)–0(2)	(United States) Gold Cup SF
406	Costa Rica	February 2, 2002	2–0	(United States) Gold Cup F
407	Italy	February 13, 2002	0–1	(Italy) Friendly
408	Honduras	March 2, 2002	4–0	(United States) Friendly
409	Ecuador	March 10, 2002	1–0	(United States) Friendly
410	Germany	March 27, 2002	2–4	(Germany) Friendly
411	Mexico	April 3, 2002	1–0	(United States) Friendly
412	Republic of Ireland	April 17, 2002	1–2	(Republic of Ireland) Friendly
413	Uruguay	May 12, 2002	2–1	(United States) Friendly
414	Jamaica	May 16, 2002	5–0	(United States) Friendly
415	Netherlands	May 19, 2002	0–2	(United States) Friendly
416	Portugal	June 5, 2002	3–2	(South Korea) World Cup GS
417	South Korea	June 10, 2002	1–1	(South Korea) World Cup GS
418	Poland	June 14, 2002	1–3	(South Korea) World Cup GS
419	Mexico	June 17, 2002	2–0	(South Korea) World Cup R16
420	Germany	June 21, 2002	0–1	(South Korea) World Cup QF
421	El Salvador	November 17, 2002	2–0	(United States) Friendly
422	Canada	January 18, 2003	4–0	(United States) Friendly
423	Argentina	February 18, 2003	0–1	(United States) Friendly
424	Jamaica	February 12, 2003	2–1	(Jamaica) Friendly
425	Venezuela	March 29, 2003	2–0	(United States) Friendly
426	Mexico	May 8, 2003	0–0	(United States) Friendly
427	Wales	May 26, 2003	2–0	(United States) Friendly
428	New Zealand	June 8, 2003	2–1	(United States) Friendly
429	Turkey	June 19, 2003	1–2	(France) Confederations Cup GS
430	Brazil	June 21, 2003	0–1	(France) Confederations Cup GS
431	Cameroon	June 21, 2003	0–0	(France) Confederations Cup GS
432	Paraguay	July 6, 2003	2–0	(United States) Friendly
433	El Salvador	July 11, 2003	2–0	(United States) Gold Cup GS
434	Martinique	July 11, 2003	2–0	(United States) Gold Cup GS
435	Cuba	July 19, 2003	5–0	(United States) Gold Cup QF
436	Brazil	July 23, 2003	1–2	(United States) Gold Cup SF
437	Costa Rica	July 26, 2003	3–2	(United States) Gold Cup 3PG
438	Denmark	January 18, 2004	1–1	(United States) Friendly
439	Netherlands	February 18, 2004	0–1	(Netherlands) Friendly
440	Haiti	March 13, 2004	1–1	(United States) Friendly
441	Poland	March 31, 2004	1–0	(Poland) Friendly
442	Mexico	April 28, 2004	1–0	(United States) Friendly
443	Honduras	June 2, 2004	4–0	(United States) Friendly
444	Grenada	June 13, 2004	3–0	(United States) World Cup Q
445	Grenada	June 20, 2004	3–2	(Grenada) World Cup Q
446	Poland	July 11, 2004	1–1	(United States) Friendly
447	Jamaica	August 18, 2004	1–1	(Jamaica) World Cup Q
448	El Salvador	September 4, 2004	2–0	(United States) World Cup Q
449	Panama	September 8, 2004	1–1	(Panama) World Cup Q
450	El Salvador	October 9, 2004	2–0	(El Salvador) World Cup Q
451	Panama	October 13, 2004	6–0	(United States) World Cup Q
452	Jamaica	November 17, 2004	1–1	(United States) World Cup Q
453	Trinidad and Tobago	February 9, 2005	2–1	(Trinidad and Tobago) World Cup Q
454	Colombia	March 9, 2005	3–0	(United States) Friendly
455	Honduras	March 19, 2005	1–0	(United States) Friendly
456	Mexico	March 27, 2005	1–2	(Mexico) World Cup Q
457	Guatemala	March 30, 2005	2–0	(United States) World Cup Q
458	England	May 28, 2005	1–2	(United States) Friendly
459	Costa Rica	June 4, 2005	3–0	(United States) World Cup Q
460	Panama	June 8, 2005	3–0	(Panama) World Cup Q
461	Cuba	July 6, 2005	4–1	(United States) Gold Cup GS
462	Canada	July 8, 2005	2–0	(United States) Gold Cup GS
463	Costa Rica	July 11, 2005	0–0	(United States) Gold Cup GS
464	Jamaica	July 16, 2005	3–1	(United States) Gold Cup QF
465	Honduras	July 21, 2005	2–1	(United States) Gold Cup SF
466	Panama	July 24, 2005	0(3)–0(1)	(United States) Gold Cup F
467	Trinidad and Tobago	August 17, 2005	1–0	(United States) World Cup Q
468	Mexico	September 3, 2005	2–0	(United States) World Cup Q
469	Guatemala	September 7, 2005	0–0	(Guatemala) World Cup Q
470	Costa Rica	October 8, 2005	0–3	(Costa Rica) World Cup Q
471	Panama	October 12, 2005	2–0	(United States) World Cup Q
472	Scotland	November 12, 2005	1–1	(Scotland) Friendly
473	Canada	January 22, 2006	0–0	(United States) Friendly
474	Norway	January 29, 2006	5–0	(United States) Friendly
475	Japan	February 10, 2006	3–2	(United States) Friendly
476	Guatemala	February 19, 2006	4–0	(United States) Friendly
477	Poland	March 1, 2006	1–0	(Germany) Friendly
478	Germany	March 22, 2006	1–4	(Germany) Friendly
479	Jamaica	April 11, 2006	1–1	(United States) Friendly
480	Morocco	May 23, 2006	0–1	(United States) Friendly
481	Venezuela	May 26, 2006	2–0	(United States) Friendly
482	Latvia	May 28, 2006	1–0	(United States) Friendly
483	Czech Republic	June 12, 2006	0–3	(Germany) World Cup GS
484	Italy	June 17, 2006	1–1	(Germany) World Cup GS
485	Ghana	June 22, 2006	1–2	(Germany) World Cup GS
486	Denmark	January 20, 2007	3–1	(United States) Friendly
487	Mexico	February 7, 2007	2–0	(United States) Friendly
488	Ecuador	March 25, 2007	3–1	(United States) Friendly
489	Guatemala	March 28, 2007	0–0	(United States) Friendly
490	China	June 2, 2007	4–1	(United States) Friendly
491	Guatemala	June 7, 2007	1–0	(United States) Gold Cup GS
492	Trinidad and Tobago	June 9, 2007	2–0	(United States) Gold Cup GS
493	El Salvador	June 12, 2007	4–0	(United States) Gold Cup GS
494	Panama	June 16, 2007	2–1	(United States) Gold Cup QF
495	Canada	June 21, 2007	2–1	(United States) Gold Cup SF
496	Mexico	June 24, 2007	2–1	(United States) Gold Cup F
497	Argentina	June 28, 2007	1–4	(Venezuela) Copa América GS
498	Paraguay	July 2, 2007	1–3	(Venezuela) Copa América GS
499	Colombia	July 5, 2007	0–1	(Venezuela) Copa América GS
500	Sweden	August 22, 2007	0–1	(Sweden) Friendly
501	Brazil	September 9, 2007	2–4	(United States) Friendly
502	Switzerland	October 17, 2007	1–0	(Switzerland) Friendly
503	South Africa	November 17, 2007	1–0	(South Africa) Friendly
504	Sweden	January 19, 2008	2–0	(United States) Friendly
505	Mexico	February 6, 2008	2–2	(United States) Friendly
506	Poland	March 26, 2008	3–0	(Poland) Friendly
507	England	May 28, 2008	0–2	(England) Friendly
508	Spain	June 4, 2008	0–1	(Spain) Friendly
509	Argentina	June 8, 2008	0–0	(United States) Friendly
510	Barbados	June 15, 2008	8–0	(United States) World Cup Q
511	Barbados	June 22, 2008	1–0	(Barbados) World Cup Q
512	Guatemala	August 20, 2008	1–0	(Guatemala) World Cup Q
513	Cuba	September 6, 2008	1–0	(Cuba) World Cup Q
514	Trinidad and Tobago	September 10, 2008	3–0	(United States) World Cup Q
515	Cuba	October 11, 2008	6–1	(United States) World Cup Q
516	Trinidad and Tobago	October 15, 2008	1–2	(Trinidad and Tobago) World Cup Q
517	Guatemala	November 19, 2008	2–0	(United States) World Cup Q
518	Sweden	January 24, 2009	3–2	(United States) Friendly
519	Mexico	February 11, 2009	2–0	(United States) World Cup Q
520	El Salvador	March 28, 2009	2–2	(El Salvador) World Cup Q
521	Trinidad and Tobago	April 1, 2009	3–0	(United States) World Cup Q
522	Costa Rica	June 3, 2009	1–3	(Costa Rica) World Cup Q
523	Honduras	June 6, 2009	2–1	(United States) World Cup Q
524	Italy	June 15, 2009	1–3	(South Africa) Confederations Cup GS
525	Brazil	June 18, 2009	0–3	(South Africa) Confederations Cup GS
526	Egypt	June 21, 2009	3–0	(South Africa) Confederations Cup GS
527	Spain	June 24, 2009	2–0	(South Africa) Confederations Cup SF
528	Brazil	June 28, 2009	2–3	(South Africa) Confederations Cup F
529	Grenada	July 4, 2009	4–0	(United States) Gold Cup GS
530	Honduras	July 8, 2009	2–0	(United States) Gold Cup GS
531	Haiti	July 11, 2009	2–2	(United States) Gold Cup GS
532	Panama	July 18, 2009	2–1	(United States) Gold Cup QF
533	Honduras	July 23, 2009	2–0	(United States) Gold Cup SF
534	Mexico	July 26, 2009	0–5	(United States) Gold Cup F
535	Mexico	August 12, 2009	1–2	(Mexico) World Cup Q
536	El Salvador	September 5, 2009	2–1	(United States) World Cup Q
537	Trinidad and Tobago	September 9, 2009	1–0	(Trinidad and Tobago) World Cup Q
538	Honduras	October 10, 2009	3–2	(Honduras) World Cup Q
539	Costa Rica	October 14, 2009	2–2	(United States) World Cup Q
540	Slovakia	November 14, 2009	0–1	(Slovakia) Friendly
541	Denmark	November 18, 2009	1–3	(Denmark) Friendly

=== 2010–2019 ===
170 matches played:
88 Wins, 48 Losses, 34 Draws
As of November 19, 2019

2010–2019
Win Draw Defeat
M	Opponent	Date	Result	Event
542	Honduras	January 23, 2010	1–3	(United States) Friendly
543	El Salvador	February 24, 2010	2–1	(United States) Friendly
544	Netherlands	March 3, 2010	1–2	(Netherlands) Friendly
545	Czech Republic	May 25, 2010	2–4	(United States) Friendly
546	Turkey	May 29, 2010	2–1	(United States) Friendly
547	Australia	June 5, 2010	3–1	(South Africa) Friendly
548	England	June 12, 2010	1–1	(South Africa) World Cup GS
549	Slovenia	June 18, 2010	2–2	(South Africa) World Cup GS
550	Algeria	June 23, 2010	1–0	(South Africa) World Cup GS
551	Ghana	June 26, 2010	1–2	(South Africa) World Cup R16
552	Brazil	August 10, 2010	0–2	(United States) Friendly
553	Poland	October 9, 2010	2–2	(United States) Friendly
554	Colombia	October 12, 2010	0–0	(United States) Friendly
555	South Africa	November 17, 2010	1–0	(South Africa) Friendly
556	Chile	January 22, 2011	1–1	(United States) Friendly
557	Argentina	March 26, 2011	1–1	(United States) Friendly
558	Paraguay	March 29, 2011	0–1	(United States) Friendly
559	Spain	June 4, 2011	0–4	(United States) Friendly
560	Canada	June 7, 2011	2–0	(United States) Gold Cup GS
561	Panama	June 11, 2011	1–2	(United States) Gold Cup GS
562	Guadeloupe	June 14, 2011	1–0	(United States) Gold Cup GS
563	Jamaica	June 19, 2011	2–0	(United States) Gold Cup QF
564	Panama	June 22, 2011	1–0	(United States) Gold Cup SF
565	Mexico	June 25, 2011	2–4	(United States) Gold Cup F
566	Mexico	August 10, 2011	1–1	(United States) Friendly
567	Costa Rica	September 2, 2011	0–1	(United States) Friendly
568	Belgium	September 6, 2011	0–1	(Belgium) Friendly
569	Honduras	October 8, 2011	1–0	(United States) Friendly
570	Ecuador	October 11, 2011	0–1	(United States) Friendly
571	France	November 11, 2011	0–1	(France) Friendly
572	Slovenia	November 15, 2011	3–2	(Slovenia) Friendly
573	Venezuela	January 21, 2012	1–0	(United States) Friendly
574	Panama	January 25, 2012	1–0	(Panama) Friendly
575	Italy	February 29, 2012	1–0	(Italy) Friendly
576	Scotland	May 26, 2012	5–1	(United States) Friendly
577	Brazil	May 30, 2012	1–4	(United States) Friendly
578	Canada	June 3, 2012	0–0	(Canada) Friendly
579	Antigua and Barbuda	June 8, 2012	3–1	(United States) World Cup Q
580	Guatemala	June 12, 2012	1–1	(Guatemala) World Cup Q
581	Mexico	August 15, 2012	1–0	(Mexico) Friendly
582	Jamaica	September 7, 2012	1–2	(Jamaica) World Cup Q
583	Jamaica	September 11, 2012	1–0	(United States) World Cup Q
584	Antigua and Barbuda	October 12, 2012	2–1	(Antigua and Barbuda) World Cup Q
585	Guatemala	October 16, 2012	3–1	(United States) World Cup Q
586	Russia	November 14, 2012	2–2	(Russia) Friendly
587	Canada	January 29, 2013	0–0	(United States) Friendly
588	Honduras	February 6, 2013	1–2	(Honduras) World Cup Q
589	Costa Rica	March 22, 2013	1–0	(United States) World Cup Q
590	Mexico	March 26, 2013	0–0	(Mexico) World Cup Q
591	Belgium	May 29, 2013	2–4	(United States) Friendly
592	Germany	June 2, 2013	4–3	(United States) Friendly
593	Jamaica	June 7, 2013	2–1	(Jamaica) World Cup Q
594	Panama	June 11, 2013	2–0	(United States) World Cup Q
595	Honduras	June 18, 2013	1–0	(United States) World Cup Q
596	Guatemala	July 5, 2013	6–0	(United States) Friendly
597	Belize	July 9, 2013	6–1	(United States) Gold Cup GS
598	Cuba	July 13, 2013	4–1	(United States) Gold Cup GS
599	Costa Rica	July 16, 2013	1–0	(United States) Gold Cup GS
600	El Salvador	July 21, 2013	5–1	(United States) Gold Cup QF
601	Honduras	July 24, 2013	3–1	(United States) Gold Cup SF
602	Panama	July 28, 2013	1–0	(United States) Gold Cup F
603	Bosnia and Herzegovina	August 14, 2013	4–3	(Bosnia and Herzegovina) Friendly
604	Costa Rica	September 6, 2013	1–3	(Costa Rica) World Cup Q
605	Mexico	September 10, 2013	2–0	(United States) World Cup Q
606	Jamaica	October 11, 2013	2–0	(United States) World Cup Q
607	Panama	October 15, 2013	3–2	(Panama) World Cup Q
608	Scotland	November 15, 2013	0–0	(Scotland) Friendly
609	Austria	November 19, 2013	0–1	(Austria) Friendly
610	South Korea	February 1, 2014	2–0	(United States) Friendly
611	Ukraine	March 5, 2014	0–2	(Cyprus) Friendly
612	Mexico	April 2, 2014	2–2	(United States) Friendly
613	Azerbaijan	May 27, 2014	2–0	(United States) Friendly
614	Turkey	June 1, 2014	2–1	(United States) Friendly
615	Nigeria	June 7, 2014	2–1	(United States) Friendly
616	Ghana	June 16, 2014	2–1	(Brazil) World Cup GS
617	Portugal	June 22, 2014	2–2	(Brazil) World Cup GS
618	Germany	June 26, 2014	0–1	(Brazil) World Cup GS
619	Belgium	July 1, 2014	1–2	(Brazil) World Cup R16
620	Czech Republic	September 3, 2014	1–0	(Czech Republic) Friendly
621	Ecuador	October 10, 2014	1–1	(United States) Friendly
622	Honduras	October 14, 2014	1–1	(United States) Friendly
623	Colombia	November 14, 2014	1–2	(England) Friendly
624	Republic of Ireland	November 18, 2014	1–4	(Republic of Ireland) Friendly
625	Chile	January 28, 2015	2–3	(Chile) Friendly
626	Panama	February 8, 2015	2–0	(United States) Friendly
627	Denmark	March 25, 2015	2–3	(Denmark) Friendly
628	Switzerland	March 31, 2015	1–1	(Switzerland) Friendly
629	Mexico	April 15, 2015	2–0	(United States) Friendly
630	Netherlands	June 5, 2015	4–3	(Netherlands) Friendly
631	Germany	June 10, 2015	2–1	(Germany) Friendly
632	Guatemala	July 3, 2015	4–0	(United States) Friendly
633	Honduras	July 7, 2015	2–1	(United States) Gold Cup GS
634	Haiti	July 10, 2015	1–0	(United States) Gold Cup GS
635	Panama	July 13, 2015	1–1	(United States) Gold Cup GS
636	Cuba	July 18, 2015	6–0	(United States) Gold Cup QF
637	Jamaica	July 22, 2015	1–2	(United States) Gold Cup SF
638	Panama	July 25, 2015	1(2)–1(3)	(United States) Gold Cup 3PG
639	Peru	September 4, 2015	2–1	(United States) Friendly
640	Brazil	September 8, 2015	1–4	(United States) Friendly
641	Mexico	October 10, 2015	2–3	(United States) CONCACAF Cup
642	Costa Rica	October 13, 2015	0–1	(United States) Friendly
643	Saint Vincent and the Grenadines	November 13, 2015	6–1	(United States) World Cup Q
644	Trinidad and Tobago	November 17, 2015	0–0	(Trinidad and Tobago) World Cup Q
645	Iceland	January 31, 2016	3–2	(United States) Friendly
646	Canada	February 5, 2016	1–0	(United States) Friendly
647	Guatemala	March 25, 2016	0–2	(Guatemala) World Cup Q
648	Guatemala	March 29, 2016	4–0	(United States) World Cup Q
649	Puerto Rico	May 22, 2016	3–1	(Puerto Rico) Friendly
650	Ecuador	May 25, 2016	1–0	(United States) Friendly
651	Bolivia	May 28, 2016	4–0	(United States) Friendly
652	Colombia	June 3, 2016	0–2	(United States) Copa América Centenario GS
653	Costa Rica	June 7, 2016	4–0	(United States) Copa América Centenario GS
654	Paraguay	June 11, 2016	1–0	(United States) Copa América Centenario GS
655	Ecuador	June 16, 2016	2–1	(United States) Copa América Centenario QF
656	Argentina	June 21, 2016	0–4	(United States) Copa América Centenario SF
657	Colombia	June 25, 2016	0–1	(United States) Copa América Centenario 3PG
658	Saint Vincent and the Grenadines	September 2, 2016	6–0	(Saint Vincent and the Grenadines) World Cup Q
659	Trinidad and Tobago	September 6, 2016	4–0	(United States) World Cup Q
660	Cuba	October 7, 2016	2–0	(Cuba) Friendly
661	New Zealand	October 11, 2016	1–1	(United States) Friendly
662	Mexico	November 11, 2016	1–2	(United States) World Cup Q
663	Costa Rica	November 15, 2016	0–4	(Costa Rica) World Cup Q
664	Serbia	January 29, 2017	0–0	(United States) Friendly
665	Jamaica	February 3, 2017	1–0	(United States) Friendly
666	Honduras	March 24, 2017	6–0	(United States) World Cup Q
667	Panama	March 28, 2017	1–1	(Panama) World Cup Q
668	Venezuela	June 3, 2017	1–1	(United States) Friendly
669	Trinidad and Tobago	June 8, 2017	2–0	(United States) World Cup Q
670	Mexico	June 11, 2017	1–1	(Mexico) World Cup Q
671	Ghana	July 1, 2017	2–1	(United States) Friendly
672	Panama	July 8, 2017	1–1	(United States) Gold Cup GS
673	Martinique	July 12, 2017	3–2	(United States) Gold Cup GS
674	Nicaragua	July 15, 2017	3–0	(United States) Gold Cup GS
675	El Salvador	July 19, 2017	2–0	(United States) Gold Cup QF
676	Costa Rica	July 22, 2017	2–0	(United States) Gold Cup SF
677	Jamaica	July 26, 2017	2–1	(United States) Gold Cup F
678	Costa Rica	September 1, 2017	0–2	(United States) World Cup Q
679	Honduras	September 5, 2017	1–1	(Honduras) World Cup Q
680	Panama	October 6, 2017	4–0	(United States) World Cup Q
681	Trinidad and Tobago	October 10, 2017	1–2	(Trinidad and Tobago) World Cup Q
682	Portugal	November 14, 2017	1–1	(Portugal) Friendly
683	Bosnia and Herzegovina	January 28, 2018	0–0	(United States) Friendly
684	Paraguay	March 27, 2018	1–0	(United States) Friendly
685	Bolivia	May 28, 2018	3–0	(United States) Friendly
686	Republic of Ireland	June 2, 2018	1–2	(Republic of Ireland) Friendly
687	France	June 9, 2018	1–1	(France) Friendly
688	Brazil	September 7, 2018	0–2	(United States) Friendly
689	Mexico	September 11, 2018	1–0	(United States) Friendly
690	Colombia	October 11, 2018	2–4	(United States) Friendly
691	Peru	October 15, 2018	1–1	(United States) Friendly
692	England	November 15, 2018	0–3	(England) Friendly
693	Italy	November 20, 2018	0–1	(Belgium) Friendly
694	Panama	January 27, 2019	3–0	(United States) Friendly
695	Costa Rica	February 2, 2019	2–0	(United States) Friendly
696	Ecuador	March 21, 2019	1–0	(United States) Friendly
697	Chile	March 26, 2019	1–1	(United States) Friendly
698	Jamaica	June 5, 2019	0–1	(United States) Friendly
699	Venezuela	June 9, 2019	0–3	(United States) Friendly
700	Guyana	June 18, 2019	4–0	(United States) Gold Cup GS
701	Trinidad and Tobago	June 22, 2019	6–0	(United States) Gold Cup GS
702	Panama	June 26, 2019	1–0	(United States) Gold Cup GS
703	Curaçao	June 30, 2019	1–0	(United States) Gold Cup QF
704	Jamaica	July 3, 2019	3–1	(United States) Gold Cup SF
705	Mexico	July 7, 2019	0–1	(United States) Gold Cup F
706	Mexico	September 6, 2019	0–3	(United States) Friendly
707	Uruguay	September 10, 2019	1–1	(United States) Friendly
708	Cuba	October 11, 2019	7–0	(United States) Nations League GS
709	Canada	October 15, 2019	0–2	(Canada) Nations League GS
710	Canada	November 15, 2019	4–1	(United States) Nations League GS
711	Cuba	November 19, 2019	4–0	(Cayman Islands) Nations League GS

=== 2020–2029 ===
108 matches played:
63 Wins, 26 Losses, 19 Draws

2020–2029
Win Draw Defeat
M	Opponent	Date	Result	Location	Event
712	Costa Rica	February 1, 2020	1–0	Dignity Health Sports Park, Carson, California	(United States) Friendly
713	Wales	November 12, 2020	0–0	Liberty Stadium, Swansea, Wales	(Wales) Friendly
714	Panama	November 16, 2020	6–2	Stadion Wiener Neustadt, Wiener Neustadt, Austria	(Austria) Friendly
715	El Salvador	December 9, 2020	6–0	Inter Miami CF Stadium, Fort Lauderdale, Florida	(United States) Friendly
716	Trinidad and Tobago	January 31, 2021	7–0	Exploria Stadium, Orlando, Florida	(United States) Friendly
717	Jamaica	March 25, 2021	4–1	Stadion Wiener Neustadt, Wiener Neustadt, Austria	(Austria) Friendly
718	Northern Ireland	March 28, 2021	2–1	Windsor Park, Belfast, Northern Ireland	(Northern Ireland) Friendly
719	Switzerland	May 30, 2021	1–2	Kybunpark, St. Gallen, Switzerland	(Switzerland) Friendly
720	Honduras	June 3, 2021	1–0	Empower Field at Mile High, Denver, Colorado	(United States) Nations League SF
721	Mexico	June 6, 2021	3–2	Empower Field at Mile High, Denver, Colorado	(United States) Nations League F
722	Costa Rica	June 9, 2021	4–0	Rio Tinto Stadium, Sandy, Utah	(United States) Friendly
723	Haiti	July 11, 2021	1–0	Children's Mercy Park, Kansas City, Kansas	(United States) Gold Cup GS
724	Martinique	July 15, 2021	6–1	Children's Mercy Park, Kansas City, Kansas	(United States) Gold Cup GS
725	Canada	July 18, 2021	1–0	Children's Mercy Park, Kansas City, Kansas	(United States) Gold Cup GS
726	Jamaica	July 25, 2021	1–0	AT&T Stadium, Arlington, Texas	(United States) Gold Cup QF
727	Qatar	July 29, 2021	1–0	Q2 Stadium, Austin, Texas	(United States) Gold Cup SF
728	Mexico	August 1, 2021	1–0	Allegiant Stadium, Las Vegas/Paradise, Nevada	(United States) Gold Cup F
729	El Salvador	September 2, 2021	0–0	Estadio Cuscatlán, San Salvador, El Salvador	(El Salvador) World Cup Q
730	Canada	September 5, 2021	1–1	Nissan Stadium, Nashville, Tennessee	(United States) World Cup Q
731	Honduras	September 8, 2021	4–1	Estadio Olímpico Metropolitano, San Pedro Sula, Honduras	(Honduras) World Cup Q
732	Jamaica	October 7, 2021	2–0	Q2 Stadium, Austin, Texas	(United States) World Cup Q
733	Panama	October 10, 2021	0–1	Estadio Rommel Fernández, Panama City, Panama	(Panama) World Cup Q
734	Costa Rica	October 13, 2021	2–1	Lower.com Field, Columbus, Ohio	(United States) World Cup Q
735	Mexico	November 12, 2021	2–0	TQL Stadium, Cincinnati, Ohio	(United States) World Cup Q
736	Jamaica	November 16, 2021	1–1	Independence Park, Kingston, Jamaica	(Jamaica) World Cup Q
737	Bosnia and Herzegovina	December 18, 2021	1–0	Dignity Health Sports Park, Carson, California	(United States) Friendly
738	El Salvador	January 27, 2022	1–0	Lower.com Field, Columbus, Ohio	(United States) World Cup Q
739	Canada	January 30, 2022	0–2	Tim Hortons Field, Hamilton, Canada	(Canada) World Cup Q
740	Honduras	February 2, 2022	3–0	Allianz Field, St. Paul, Minnesota	(United States) World Cup Q
741	Mexico	March 24, 2022	0–0	Estadio Azteca, Mexico City, Mexico	(Mexico) World Cup Q
742	Panama	March 27, 2022	5–1	Exploria Stadium, Orlando, Florida	(United States) World Cup Q
743	Costa Rica	March 30, 2022	0–2	Estadio Nacional, San José, Costa Rica	(Costa Rica) World Cup Q
744	Morocco	June 1, 2022	3–0	TQL Stadium, Cincinnati, Ohio	(United States) Friendly
745	Uruguay	June 5, 2022	0–0	Children's Mercy Park, Kansas City, Kansas	(United States) Friendly
746	Grenada	June 10, 2022	5–0	Q2 Stadium, Austin, Texas	(United States) Nations League GS
747	El Salvador	June 14, 2022	1–1	Estadio Cuscatlán, San Salvador, El Salvador	(El Salvador) Nations League GS
748	Japan	September 23, 2022	0–2	Merkur Spiel-Arena, Düsseldorf, Germany	(Germany) Friendly
749	Saudi Arabia	September 27, 2022	0–0	Estadio Nueva Condomina, Murcia, Spain	(Spain) Friendly
750	Wales	November 21, 2022	1–1	Ahmad bin Ali Stadium, Al Rayyan, Qatar	(Qatar) World Cup GS
751	England	November 25, 2022	0–0	Al Bayt Stadium, Al Khor, Qatar	(Qatar) World Cup GS
752	Iran	November 29, 2022	1–0	Al Thumama Stadium, Doha, Qatar	(Qatar) World Cup GS
753	Netherlands	December 3, 2022	1–3	Khalifa International Stadium, Al Rayyan, Qatar	(Qatar) World Cup R16
754	Serbia	January 25, 2023	1–2	BMO Stadium, Los Angeles, California	(United States) Friendly
755	Colombia	January 28, 2023	0–0	Dignity Health Sports Park, Carson, California	(United States) Friendly
756	Grenada	March 24, 2023	7–1	Kirani James Athletic Stadium, St. George's, Grenada	(Grenada) Nations League GS
757	El Salvador	March 27, 2023	1–0	Exploria Stadium, Orlando, Florida	(United States) Nations League GS
758	Mexico	April 19, 2023	1–1	State Farm Stadium, Glendale, Arizona	(United States) Friendly
759	Mexico	June 15, 2023	3–0	Allegiant Stadium, Las Vegas/Paradise, Nevada	(United States) Nations League SF
760	Canada	June 18, 2023	2–0	Allegiant Stadium, Las Vegas/Paradise, Nevada	(United States) Nations League F
761	Jamaica	June 24, 2023	1–1	Soldier Field, Chicago, Illinois	(United States) Gold Cup GS
762	Saint Kitts and Nevis	June 28, 2023	6–0	Energizer Park, St. Louis, Missouri	(United States) Gold Cup GS
763	Trinidad and Tobago	July 2, 2023	6–0	Bank of America Stadium, Charlotte, North Carolina	(United States) Gold Cup GS
764	Canada	July 9, 2023	2(3)–2(2)	TQL Stadium, Cincinnati, Ohio	(United States) Gold Cup QF
765	Panama	July 12, 2023	1(4)–1(5)	Snapdragon Stadium, San Diego, California	(United States) Gold Cup SF
766	Uzbekistan	September 9, 2023	3–0	CityPark, St. Louis, Missouri	(United States) Friendly
767	Oman	September 12, 2023	4–0	Allianz Field, St. Paul, Minnesota	(United States) Friendly
768	Germany	October 14, 2023	1–3	Pratt & Whitney Stadium, East Hartford, Connecticut	(United States) Friendly
769	Ghana	October 17, 2023	4–0	Geodis Park, Nashville, Tennessee	(United States) Friendly
770	Trinidad and Tobago	November 16, 2023	3–0	Q2 Stadium, Austin, Texas	(United States) Nations League QF
771	Trinidad and Tobago	November 20, 2023	1–2	Hasely Crawford Stadium, Port of Spain, Trinidad and Tobago	(Trinidad and Tobago) Nations League QF
772	Slovenia	January 20, 2024	0–1	Toyota Field, San Antonio, Texas	(United States) Friendly
773	Jamaica	March 21, 2024	3–1	AT&T Stadium, Arlington, Texas	(United States) Nations League SF
774	Mexico	March 24, 2024	2–0	AT&T Stadium, Arlington, Texas	(United States) Nations League F
775	Colombia	June 8, 2024	1–5	Commanders Field, Landover, Maryland (Washington, D.C.)	(United States) Friendly
776	Brazil	June 12, 2024	1–1	Camping World Stadium, Orlando, Florida	(United States) Friendly
777	Bolivia	June 23, 2024	2–0	AT&T Stadium, Arlington, Texas	(United States) Copa América GS
778	Panama	June 27, 2024	1–2	Mercedes-Benz Stadium, Atlanta, Georgia	(United States) Copa América GS
779	Uruguay	July 1, 2024	0–1	Arrowhead Stadium, Kansas City, Missouri	(United States) Copa América GS
780	Canada	September 7, 2024	1–2	Children's Mercy Park, Kansas City, Kansas	(United States) Friendly
781	New Zealand	September 10, 2024	1–1	TQL Stadium, Cincinnati, Ohio	(United States) Friendly
782	Panama	October 12, 2024	2–0	Q2 Stadium, Austin, Texas	(United States) Friendly
783	Mexico	October 15, 2024	0–2	Estadio Akron, Zapopan, Mexico	(Mexico) Friendly
784	Jamaica	November 14, 2024	1–0	Independence Park, Kingston, Jamaica	(Jamaica) Nations League QF
785	Jamaica	November 18, 2024	4–2	CityPark, St. Louis, Missouri	(United States) Nations League QF
786	Venezuela	January 18, 2025	3–1	Chase Stadium, Fort Lauderdale, Florida	(United States) Friendly
787	Costa Rica	January 22, 2025	3–0	Inter&Co Stadium, Orlando, Florida	(United States) Friendly
788	Panama	March 20, 2025	0–1	SoFi Stadium, Inglewood, California	(United States) Nations League SF
789	Canada	March 23, 2025	1–2	SoFi Stadium, Inglewood, California	(United States) Nations League 3PG
790	Turkey	June 7, 2025	1–2	Pratt & Whitney Stadium, East Hartford, Connecticut	(United States) Friendly
791	Switzerland	June 10, 2025	0–4	Geodis Park, Nashville, Tennessee	(United States) Friendly
792	Trinidad and Tobago	June 15, 2025	5–0	PayPal Park, San Jose, California	(United States) Gold Cup GS
793	Saudi Arabia	June 19, 2025	1–0	Q2 Stadium, Austin, Texas	(United States) Gold Cup GS
794	Haiti	June 22, 2025	2–1	AT&T Stadium, Arlington, Texas	(United States) Gold Cup GS
795	Costa Rica	June 29, 2025	2(4)–2(3)	U.S. Bank Stadium, Minneapolis, Minnesota	(United States) Gold Cup QF
796	Guatemala	July 2, 2025	2–1	Energizer Park, St. Louis, Missouri	(United States) Gold Cup SF
797	Mexico	July 6, 2025	1–2	NRG Stadium, Houston, Texas	(United States) Gold Cup F
798	South Korea	September 6, 2025	0–2	Sports Illustrated Stadium, Harrison, New Jersey	(United States) Friendly
799	Japan	September 9, 2025	2–0	Lower.com Field, Columbus, Ohio	(United States) Friendly
800	Ecuador	October 10, 2025	1–1	Q2 Stadium, Austin, Texas	(United States) Friendly
801	Australia	October 14, 2025	2–1	Dick's Sporting Goods Park, Commerce City, Colorado	(United States) Friendly
802	Paraguay	November 15, 2025	2–1	Subaru Park, Chester, Pennsylvania	(United States) Friendly
803	Uruguay	November 18, 2025	5–1	Raymond James Stadium, Tampa, Florida	(United States) Friendly
804	Belgium	March 28, 2026	2–5	Mercedes-Benz Stadium, Atlanta, Georgia	(United States) Friendly
805	Portugal	March 31, 2026	0–2	Mercedes-Benz Stadium, Atlanta, Georgia	(United States) Friendly
806	Senegal	May 31, 2026	3–2	Bank of America Stadium, Charlotte, North Carolina	(United States) Friendly
807	Germany	June 6, 2026	1–2	Soldier Field, Chicago, Illinois	(United States) Friendly
808	Paraguay	June 12, 2026	4–1	SoFi Stadium, Inglewood, California	(United States) World Cup GS
809	Australia	June 19, 2026	2–0	Lumen Field, Seattle, Washington	(United States) World Cup GS
810	Turkey	June 25, 2026	2–3	SoFi Stadium, Inglewood, California	(United States) World Cup GS
811	Bosnia and Herzegovina	July 1, 2026	2–0	Levi's Stadium, Santa Clara, California	(United States) World Cup R32
812	Belgium	July 6, 2026	1–4	Lumen Field, Seattle, Washington	(United States) World Cup R16
813	Peru	September 26, 2026	4–1	Inter.co Stadium, Orlando, Florida	(United States) Friendly
814	Chile	September 29, 2026	4–2	Energizer Park, St. Louis, Missouri	(United States) Friendly
815	Mexico	October 3, 2026	3–0	State Farm Stadium, Glendale, Arizona	(United States) Friendly
816	Canada	October 6, 2026	1–0	Allianz Field, St. Paul, Minnesota	(United States) Friendly
817	Haiti	November 14, 2026	6–0	Nu Stadium, Miami, Florida	(United States) Nations League QF
818	Haiti	November 17, 2026	2–0	TQL Stadium, Cincinnati, Ohio	(United States) Nations League QF
819	Jamaica	December 13, 2026		Inter Miami CF Stadium, Fort Lauderdale, Florida	(United States) Friendly
820	Mexico	March 25, 2027		SoFi Stadium, Inglewood, California	(United States) Nations League SF
821	Canada or Panama	March 28, 2027		SoFi Stadium, Inglewood, California	(United States) Nations League F/3PG

== Number of matches by U.S. state ==
- Includes all matches on U.S. soil, including friendlies, World Cup qualifiers, CONCACAF Gold Cup, CONCACAF Nations League, 1994 FIFA World Cup, Copa América Centenario, 2024 Copa América, 2026 FIFA World Cup and others
- Updated to November 17, 2026

P	State	Matches	Most Recent	Opponent	Record (W-L-D)	Win %
1	California	123	July 1, 2026	Bosnia and Herzegovina	58-35-30	0.594
2	Florida	58	November 14, 2026	Haiti	29-16-13	0.612
3	Texas	39	October 10, 2025	Ecuador	24-5-10	0.744
4	(Washington, D.C.) Washington D.C.	26	October 11, 2019	Cuba	16-4-6	0.730
5	Ohio	25	November 17, 2026	Haiti	17-3-5	0.780
5	Missouri	25	September 29, 2026	Chile	19-3-3	0.820
5	New Jersey	25	September 6, 2025	South Korea	7-11-7	0.420
5	Massachusetts	25	September 8, 2015	Brazil	17-3-5	0.780
9	Illinois	18	June 6, 2026	Germany	8-6-4	0.556
10	Connecticut	16	June 7, 2025	Turkey	8-5-3	0.594
11	Pennsylvania	14	November 15, 2025	Paraguay	9-2-3	0.750
12	Washington	12	July 6, 2026	Belgium	8-3-1	0.708
13	Tennessee	11	June 10, 2025	Switzerland	6-3-2	0.636
13	Kansas	11	September 7, 2024	Canada	8-1-2	0.818
15	New York	10	November 30, 1984	Ecuador	4-4-2	0.500
16	Arizona	9	October 3, 2026	Mexico	5-1-3	0.722
16	North Carolina	9	May 31, 2026	Senegal	6-1-2	0.778
16	Colorado	9	October 14, 2025	Australia	8-1-0	0.889
19	(Georgia (U.S. state)) Georgia	6	March 31, 2026	Portugal	2-4-0	0.333
19	Maryland	6	June 8, 2024	Colombia	2-3-1	0.417
19	Utah	6	June 9, 2021	Costa Rica	5-0-1	0.916
22	Minnesota	5	October 6, 2026	Canada	4-0-1	0.900
23	Oregon	4	July 9, 2013	Belize	3-0-1	0.875
24	Nevada	3	June 18, 2023	Canada	3-0-0	1.000
24	Michigan	3	June 7, 2011	Canada	2-0-1	0.833
24	New Mexico	3	March 19, 2005	Honduras	1-2-0	0.333
24	Indiana	3	May 25, 1988	El Salvador	2-0-1	0.833
24	Alabama	3	March 30, 2005	Guatemala	2-0-1	0.833
29	Virginia	2	June 8, 2003	New Zealand	2-0-0	1.000
30	Wisconsin	1	July 28, 1990	East Germany	0-1-0	0.000

== Results by home stadium ==
- Includes all matches on U.S. soil, including friendlies, World Cup Qualifiers, CONCACAF Gold Cup, CONCACAF Nations League, 1994 FIFA World Cup, Copa América Centenario, 2024 Copa América, 2026 FIFA World Cup and others
- Updated to November 17, 2026
- Stadiums are listed under their current or most recent name, which does not necessarily match the stadium's name when a given match was played.
- Win % = Number of wins divided by number of games played (draws count as half a win).

Matches	Stadium	Location	First	Opponent	Most recent	Opponent	Record attendance	W-L-D	Win %
24	RFK Stadium	(Washington, D.C.) Washington, D.C.	October 6, 1977	China	October 11, 2016	New Zealand	51,996	15–3–6	0.750
20	Los Angeles Memorial Coliseum	Los Angeles, California	March 7, 1965	Mexico	October 25, 2000	Mexico	91,255	9–7–4	0.550
19	Dignity Health Sports Park	Carson, California	January 18, 2004	Denmark	January 28, 2023	Colombia	27,000	13–2–4	0.790
19	Miami Orange Bowl	Miami, Florida	December 2, 1984	Ecuador	March 13, 2004	Haiti	49,591	2–10–7	0.289
17	Soldier Field	Chicago, Illinois	August 3, 1973	Poland	June 6, 2026	Germany	63,636	7–6–4	0.529
17	Rose Bowl	Pasadena, California	June 29, 1991	Trinidad and Tobago	October 10, 2015	Mexico	93,869	9–5–3	0.618
15	Gillette Stadium	Foxborough, Massachusetts	May 19, 2002	Netherlands	September 8, 2015	Brazil	64,121	10–3–2	0.733
12	Historic Crew Stadium	Columbus, Ohio	October 11, 2000	Costa Rica	November 11, 2016	Mexico	24,685	8–1–3	0.792
11	Children's Mercy Park	Kansas City, Kansas	June 14, 2011	Guadeloupe	September 7, 2024	Canada	20,109	8–1–2	0.818
10	Foxboro Stadium	Foxborough, Massachusetts	June 1, 1991	Republic of Ireland	October 7, 2001	Jamaica	57,877	7–0–3	0.850
10	Stanford Stadium	Stanford, California	July 29, 1984	Costa Rica	March 16, 1997	Canada	84,147	4–4–2	0.500
9	Pratt & Whitney Stadium	East Hartford, Connecticut	August 17, 2005	Trinidad and Tobago	June 7, 2025	Turkey	37,743	4–3–2	0.556
9	Giants Stadium	East Rutherford, New Jersey	May 2, 1979	France	July 26, 2009	Mexico	79,156	4–2–3	0.611
8	Inter.co Stadium	Orlando, Florida	October 6, 2017	Panama	September 26, 2026	Peru	25,303	8–0–0	1.000
8	Nissan Stadium	Nashville, Tennessee	May 23, 2006	Morocco	September 5, 2021	Canada	47,622	4–2–2	0.625
8	San Diego Stadium	San Diego, California	May 11, 1969	Haiti	January 29, 2017	Serbia	50,234	1–5–2	0.250
8	Titan Stadium	Fullerton, California	May 23, 1993	Bolivia	March 9, 2005	Colombia	10,319	4–0–4	0.750
8	Cotton Bowl	Dallas, Texas	September 8, 1974	Mexico	April 28, 2004	Mexico	45,048	5–1–2	0.750
7	State Farm Stadium	Glendale, Arizona	February 7, 2007	Mexico	October 3, 2026	Mexico	64,932	4–1–2	0.714
7	Lumen Field	(Washington (state)) Seattle, Washington	July 7, 2005	Cuba	July 6, 2026	Belgium	66,925	6–1–0	0.857
7	Raymond James Stadium	Tampa, Florida	March 25, 2007	Ecuador	November 18, 2025	Uruguay	38,631	5–2–0	0.714
7	Q2 Stadium	Austin, Texas	July 29, 2021	Qatar	October 10, 2025	Ecuador	20,738	6–0–1	0.929
7	AT&T Stadium	Arlington, Texas	July 24, 2013	Honduras	June 22, 2025	Haiti	81,410	7–0–0	1.000
7	Busch Memorial Stadium	St. Louis, Missouri	October 6, 1984	Netherlands Antilles	June 4, 1997	Paraguay	15,823	5–0–2	0.857
7	World Wide Technology Soccer Park	Fenton, Missouri	May 30, 1987	Trinidad and Tobago	April 4, 1990	Iceland	5,235	6–1–0	0.857
6	Lincoln Financial Field	Philadelphia, Pennsylvania	July 18, 2009	Panama	June 30, 2019	Curaçao	55,407	5–0–1	0.917
5	TQL Stadium	Cincinnati, Ohio	November 12, 2021	Mexico	November 17, 2026	Haiti	26,000	3–0–2	0.800
5	Energizer Park	St. Louis, Missouri	June 28, 2023	Saint Kitts and Nevis	September 29, 2026	Chile	22,423	5–0–0	1.000
5	Sports Illustrated Stadium	Harrison, New Jersey	October 11, 2011	Ecuador	September 6, 2025	South Korea	26,762	1–4–0	0.200
5	NRG Stadium	Houston, Texas	May 8, 2003	Mexico	July 6, 2025	Mexico	70,925	1–2–2	0.400
5	America First Field	Sandy, Utah	September 5, 2009	El Salvador	June 9, 2021	Costa Rica	20,250	4–0–1	0.900
5	EverBank Stadium	Jacksonville, Florida	June 17, 1997	Israel	September 6, 2016	Trinidad and Tobago	52,033	5–0–0	1.000
4	Allianz Field	Saint Paul, Minnesota	June 18, 2019	Guyana	October 6, 2026	Canada	19,418	4–0–0	1.000
4	SoFi Stadium	Inglewood, California	March 20, 2025	Panama	June 25, 2026	Turkey	70,492	1–3–0	0.250
4	Subaru Park	Chester, Pennsylvania	October 12, 2010	Colombia	November 15, 2025	Paraguay	17,224	2–0–2	0.750
4	Dick's Sporting Goods Park	Commerce City, Colorado	November 19, 2008	Guatemala	October 14, 2025	Australia	19,374	4–0–0	1.000
4	Camping World Stadium	Orlando, Florida	June 13, 1992	Australia	June 12, 2024	Brazil	60,016	1–2–1	0.375
4	MetLife Stadium	East Rutherford, New Jersey	August 10, 2010	Brazil	September 7, 2019	Mexico	78,936	0–3–1	0.125
4	Huntington Bank Field	Cleveland, Ohio	May 26, 2006	Venezuela	June 22, 2019	Trinidad and Tobago	27,934	3–1–0	0.750
4	Toyota Stadium	Frisco, Texas	February 19, 2006	Guatemala	May 25, 2016	Ecuador	22,357	3–0–1	0.875
4	Candlestick Park	San Francisco, California	August 10, 1973	Poland	May 27, 2014	Azerbaijan	30,000	2–2–0	0.500
4	Providence Park	Portland, Oregon	April 4, 1985	Canada	July 9, 2013	Belize	27,396	3–0–1	0.875
4	Veterans Stadium	New Britain, Connecticut	August 12, 1973	Poland	May 26, 1996	Scotland	10,500	3–1–0	0.750
4	Murdock Stadium	Torrance, California	May 19, 1985	Trinidad and Tobago	March 16, 1991	Canada	11,800	2–1–1	0.625
3	Levi's Stadium	Santa Clara, California	June 3, 2016	Colombia	July 1, 2026	Bosnia and Herzegovina	68,827	2–1–0	0.667
3	Mercedes-Benz Stadium	(Georgia (U.S. state)) Atlanta, Georgia	June 27, 2024	Panama	March 31, 2026	Portugal	66,867	0–3–0	0.000
3	ScottsMiracle-Gro Field	Columbus, Ohio	October 13, 2021	Costa Rica	September 9, 2025	Japan	20,192	3–0–0	1.000
3	PayPal Park	San Jose, California	March 24, 2017	Honduras	June 15, 2025	Trinidad and Tobago	17,729	3–0–0	1.000
3	Allegiant Stadium	Paradise, Nevada	August 1, 2021	Mexico	June 18, 2023	Canada	65,000	3–0–0	1.000
3	Empower Field at Mile High	Denver, Colorado	April 3, 2002	Mexico	June 6, 2021	Mexico	48,476	3–0–0	1.000
3	Hard Rock Stadium	Miami Gardens, Florida	February 18, 1994	Bolivia	October 8, 2011	Honduras	21,900	1–1–1	0.500
3	Spartan Stadium	San Jose, California	May 16, 1998	Macedonia	June 2, 2007	China	23,861	1–0–2	0.667
3	University Stadium	Albuquerque, New Mexico	June 7, 1988	Ecuador	March 19, 2005	Honduras	15,610	1–2–0	0.333
3	Oakland Coliseum	Oakland, California	February 1, 1998	Cuba	January 27, 2001	China	36,240	3–0–0	1.000
3	Lockhart Stadium	Fort Lauderdale, Florida	October 25, 1980	Canada	February 21, 1999	Chile	14,896	2–0–1	0.833
3	Tampa Stadium	Tampa, Florida	February 8, 1985	Switzerland	May 28, 1995	Costa Rica	7,415	1–1–1	0.500
3	Rutgers Stadium	Piscataway, New Jersey	May 5, 1990	Malta	May 25, 1994	Saudi Arabia	12,063	1–0–2	0.667
3	Kingdome	(Washington (state)) Seattle, Washington	October 20, 1976	Canada	January 29, 1994	Russia	43,651	1–1–1	0.500
3	Legion Field	Birmingham, Alabama	March 12, 2000	Tunisia	March 30, 2005	Guatemala	31,465	2–0–1	0.833
3	Vert Stadium	High Point, North Carolina	September 15, 1990	Trinidad and Tobago	October 16, 1993	Ukraine	11,361	2–1–0	0.667
3	Kuntz Stadium	Indianapolis, Indiana	August 9, 1987	Trinidad and Tobago	May 25, 1988	El Salvador	unknown	2–0–1	0.833
3	Polo Grounds	(New York (state)) Manhattan, New York, New York	May 19, 1935	Scotland	May 27, 1964	England	50,000	1–2–0	0.333
3	Ebbets Field	(New York (state)) New York City, New York	November 8, 1925	Canada	October 17, 1948	Israel	8,000	3–0–0	1.000
2	Bank of America Stadium	Charlotte, North Carolina	July 2, 2023	Trinidad and Tobago	May 31, 2026	Senegal	57,741	2–0–0	1.000
2	Geodis Park	Nashville, Tennessee	October 17, 2023	Ghana	June 10, 2025	Switzerland	20,602	1–1–0	0.500
2	Inter Miami CF Stadium	Fort Lauderdale, Florida	December 9, 2020	El Salvador	January 18, 2025	Venezuela	18,008	2–0–0	1.000
2	Arrowhead Stadium	Kansas City, Missouri	April 25, 2001	Costa Rica	July 1, 2024	Uruguay	55,460	1–1–0	0.500
2	Northwest Stadium	Landover, Maryland	May 30, 2012	Brazil	June 8, 2024	Colombia	67,619	0–2–0	0.000
2	Audi Field	(Washington, D.C.) Washington, D.C.	June 5, 2019	Jamaica	October 11, 2019	Cuba	17,719	1–1–0	0.500
2	Busch Stadium	St. Louis, Missouri	November 13, 2015	Saint Vincent and the Grenadines	September 10, 2019	Uruguay	43,433	1–0–1	0.750
2	Shell Energy Stadium	Houston, Texas	January 29, 2013	Canada	March 26, 2019	Chile	18,033	0–0–2	0.500
2	WakeMed Soccer Park	Cary, North Carolina	April 11, 2006	Jamaica	March 27, 2018	Paraguay	9,895	1–0–1	0.750
2	M&T Bank Stadium	Baltimore, Maryland	July 21, 2013	El Salvador	July 18, 2015	Cuba	70,540	2–0–0	1.000
2	City Stadium	Richmond, Virginia	November 10, 1996	Trinidad and Tobago	June 8, 2003	New Zealand	unknown	2–0–0	1.000
2	Baltimore Memorial Stadium	Baltimore, Maryland	August 29, 1972	Canada	August 7, 1997	Ecuador	13,629	0–1–1	0.250
2	Angel Stadium of Anaheim	Anaheim, California	January 13, 1996	Trinidad and Tobago	January 16, 1996	El Salvador	52,345	2–0–0	1.000
2	Pontiac Silverdome	Pontiac, Michigan	February 2, 1992	CIS	June 18, 1994	Switzerland	73,425	1–0–1	0.750
2	Yale Bowl	New Haven, Connecticut	June 6, 1993	Brazil	May 28, 1994	Greece	44,579	0–1–1	0.250
2	Sun Devil Stadium	Tempe, Arizona	January 30, 1993	Denmark	January 15, 1994	Norway	15,386	1–0–1	0.750
2	Trabuco Hills High School	Mission Viejo, California	May 26, 1993	Peru	November 14, 1993	Cayman Islands	5,500	1–0–1	0.750
2	LeBard Stadium	Costa Mesa, California	March 3, 1993	Canada	April 17, 1993	Iceland	5,743	0–0–2	0.500
2	Mile High Stadium	Denver, Colorado	May 5, 1991	Uruguay	May 17, 1992	Scotland	35,772	1–1–0	0.500
2	Atlanta–Fulton County Stadium	(Georgia (U.S. state)) Atlanta, Georgia	October 27, 1968	Canada	October 10, 1977	China	15,000	2–0–0	1.000
2	Wrigley Field	Los Angeles, California	May 28, 1959	England	November 6, 1960	Mexico	13,000	0–1–1	0.250
2	Downing Stadium	(New York (state)) New York, New York	June 19, 1949	Scotland	May 27, 1964	England	17,000	0–2–0	0.000
2	Clark Field	Newark, New Jersey	November 28, 1885	Canada	November 26, 1886	Canada	2,000	1–1–0	0.500
1	Nu Stadium	Miami, Florida	November 14, 2026	Haiti	November 14, 2026	Haiti	21,597	1–0–0	1.000
1	U.S. Bank Stadium	Minneapolis, Minnesota	June 29, 2025	Costa Rica	June 29, 2025	Costa Rica	32,289	0–0–1	0.500
1	Toyota Field	San Antonio, Texas	January 20, 2024	Slovenia	January 20, 2024	Slovenia	9,191	0–1–0	0.000
1	Snapdragon Stadium	San Diego, California	July 12, 2023	Panama	July 12, 2023	Panama	31,690	0–0–1	0.500
1	BMO Stadium	Los Angeles, California	January 25, 2023	Serbia	January 25, 2023	Serbia	11,475	0–1–0	0.000
1	Nippert Stadium	Cincinnati, Ohio	June 9, 2019	Venezuela	June 9, 2019	Venezuela	23,955	0–1–0	0.000
1	Finley Stadium	Chattanooga, Tennessee	February 3, 2017	Jamaica	February 3, 2017	Jamaica	17,903	1–0–0	1.000
1	Georgia Dome	(Georgia (U.S. state)) Atlanta, Georgia	July 22, 2015	Jamaica	July 22, 2015	Jamaica	70,511	0–1–0	0.000
1	Alamodome	San Antonio, Texas	April 15, 2015	Mexico	April 15, 2015	Mexico	64,369	1–0–0	1.000
1	FAU Stadium	Boca Raton, Florida	October 14, 2014	Honduras	October 14, 2014	Honduras	14,805	0–0–1	0.500
1	Ford Field	Detroit, Michigan	June 7, 2011	Canada	June 7, 2011	Canada	28,209	1–0–0	1.000
1	SeatGeek Stadium	Bridgeview, Illinois	September 10, 2008	Trinidad and Tobago	September 10, 2008	Trinidad and Tobago	11,452	1–0–0	1.000
1	Oracle Park	San Francisco, California	February 10, 2006	Japan	February 10, 2006	Japan	37,365	1–0–0	1.000
1	Rice-Eccles Stadium	Salt Lake City, Utah	June 4, 2005	Costa Rica	June 4, 2005	Costa Rica	40,586	1–0–0	1.000
1	T-Mobile Park	(Washington (state)) Seattle, Washington	March 2, 2002	Honduras	March 2, 2002	Honduras	38,534	1–0–0	1.000
1	High Point Solutions Stadium	Piscataway, New Jersey	June 25, 1995	Colombia	June 25, 1995	Colombia	36,126	0–0–1	0.500
1	DeVore Stadium	Chula Vista, California	April 24, 1994	Iceland	April 24, 1994	Iceland	3,017	0–1–0	0.000
1	Richardson Stadium	Davidson, North Carolina	April 20, 1994	Moldova	April 20, 1994	Moldova	4,790	1–0–0	1.000
1	Gator Bowl Stadium	Jacksonville, Florida	April 16, 1994	Moldova	April 16, 1994	Moldova	6,103	0–0–1	0.500
1	Goodman Stadium	Bethlehem, Pennsylvania	October 23, 1993	Ukraine	October 23, 1993	Ukraine	7,896	0–1–0	0.000
1	Harder Stadium	Santa Barbara, California	February 6, 1993	Romania	February 6, 1993	Romania	9,127	0–0–1	0.500
1	UNCG Soccer Stadium	Greensboro, North Carolina	October 9, 1992	Canada	October 9, 1992	Canada	2,097	0–0–1	0.500
1	Texas Stadium	Irving, Texas	November 24, 1991	Costa Rica	November 24, 1991	Costa Rica	22,787	0–0–1	0.500
1	Milwaukee County Stadium	Milwaukee, Wisconsin	July 28, 1990	East Germany	July 28, 1990	East Germany	12,572	0–1–0	0.000
1	Hersheypark Stadium	Hershey, Pennsylvania,	May 9, 1990	Poland	May 9, 1990	Poland	12,063	1–0–0	1.000
1	Cocoa Expo Sports Center	Cocoa, Florida	November 14, 1989	Bermuda	November 14, 1989	Bermuda	unknown	1–0–0	1.000
1	Comalander Stadium	San Antonio, Texas	June 14, 1988	Costa Rica	June 14, 1988	Costa Rica	5,150	1–0–0	1.000
1	Amon G. Carter Stadium	Fort Worth, Texas	June 12, 1988	Ecuador	June 12, 1988	Ecuador	7,250	0–0–1	0.500
1	Astrodome	Houston, Texas	June 10, 1988	Ecuador	June 10, 1988	Ecuador	unknown	0–1–0	0.000
1	Bulldog Stadium	Fresno, California	June 5, 1988	Chile	June 5, 1988	Chile	4,610	0–1–0	0.000
1	Stagg Memorial Stadium	Stockton, California	June 1, 1988	Chile	June 1, 1988	Chile	unknown	0–0–1	0.500
1	Hofstra University Soccer Stadium	(New York (state)) Hempstead, New York	November 30, 1984	Ecuador	November 30, 1984	Ecuador	10,000	0–0–1	0.500
1	Weingart Stadium	Monterey Park, California	September 30, 1977	El Salvador	September 30, 1977	El Salvador	15,000	0–0–1	0.500
1	Memorial Stadium	(Washington (state)) Seattle, Washington	June 24, 1975	Poland	June 24, 1975	Poland	13,195	0–1–0	0.000
1	Dillon Stadium	Hartford, Connecticut	September 9, 1973	Bermuda	September 9, 1973	Bermuda	4,200	1–0–0	1.000
1	Municipal Stadium	Kansas City, Missouri	November 2, 1968	Bermuda	November 2, 1968	Bermuda	2,265	1–0–0	1.000
1	Temple Stadium	Philadelphia, Pennsylvania	September 25, 1968	Israel	September 25, 1968	Israel	7,161	0–1–0	0.000
1	Yankee Stadium	(New York (state)) New York City, New York	September 15, 1968	Israel	September 15, 1968	Israel	10,118	0–0–1	0.500
1	Public School Ground	St. Louis, Missouri	July 6, 1957	Canada	July 6, 1957	Canada	1,500	0–1–0	0.000
1	Veterans Memorial Stadium	Long Beach, California	April 28, 1957	Mexico	April 28, 1957	Mexico	12,500	0–1–0	0.000
1	Yankee Stadium	(New York (state)) The Bronx, New York, New York	September 15, 1968	Israel	September 15, 1968	Israel	17,000	0–1–0	0.000
1	Shibe Park	Philadelphia, Pennsylvania	October 14, 1948	Israel	October 14, 1948	Israel	30,000	1–0–0	1.000
1	Newark Schools Stadium	Newark, New Jersey	June 9, 1935	Scotland	June 9, 1935	Scotland	10,000	0–1–0	0.000
1	Wright Street Grounds	Newark, New Jersey	November 24, 1887	Canada	November 24, 1887	Canada	2,000	0–1–0	0.000
