= List of CONCACAF Gold Cup finals =

The CONCACAF Gold Cup (Spanish: Copa de Oro de la CONCACAF) is an association football competition for men's national football teams in North America, Central America, and the Caribbean, governed by CONCACAF. The tournament is held every two years and is used to determine the continental champion; previously, the winner of the competition would also qualify for the now-defunct FIFA Confederations Cup.

The Gold Cup was established in 1991 as the successor to the CONCACAF Championship and has been hosted primarily in the United States. Various tournaments have had eight to sixteen teams, including guest teams from outside the confederation. Each edition begins with a round-robin group stage and culminates in a single-elimination knockout stage. Mexico is the most successful team in the tournament's history, having won ten times, followed by the United States with seven titles and Canada with one.

== List of finals ==
Key to the list of finals
a.e.t.	Match was won after extra time
a.s.d.e.t.	Match was won after sudden death in extra time
p	Match was won on a penalty shoot-out

- The "Year" column refers to the year the CONCACAF Gold Cup was held, and wikilinks to the article about that tournament.
- Links in the "Winners" and "Runners-up" columns point to the articles for the national football teams of the countries, not the articles for the countries.
- The wikilinks in the "Final score" column point to the article about that tournament's final game.

Year	Winners	Score	Runners-up	Venue	Location	Attendance	Ref.
1991	United States	0–0 (a.e.t.) (4–3 p)	Honduras	Memorial Coliseum	Los Angeles, United States	39,873	
1993	Mexico	4–0	United States	Estadio Azteca	Mexico City, Mexico	130,800	
1996	Mexico	2–0	Brazil	Memorial Coliseum	Los Angeles, United States	88,155	
1998	Mexico	1–0	United States	Memorial Coliseum	Los Angeles, United States	91,255	
2000	Canada	2–0	Colombia	Memorial Coliseum	Los Angeles, United States	6,197	
2002	United States	2–0	Costa Rica	Rose Bowl	Pasadena, United States	14,432	
2003	Mexico	1–0 (a.s.d.e.t.)	Brazil	Estadio Azteca	Mexico City, Mexico	80,000	
2005	United States	0–0 (a.e.t.) (3–1 p)	Panama	Giants Stadium	East Rutherford, United States	31,018	
2007	United States	2–1	Mexico	Soldier Field	Chicago, United States	60,000	
2009	Mexico	5–0	United States	Giants Stadium	East Rutherford, United States	79,156	
2011	Mexico	4–2	United States	Rose Bowl	Pasadena, United States	93,420	
2013	United States	1–0	Panama	Soldier Field	Chicago, United States	57,920	
2015	Mexico	3–1	Jamaica	Lincoln Financial Field	Philadelphia, United States	68,930	
2017	United States	2–1	Jamaica	Levi's Stadium	Santa Clara, United States	63,032	
2019	Mexico	1–0	United States	Soldier Field	Chicago, United States	62,493	
2021	United States	1–0 (a.e.t.)	Mexico	Allegiant Stadium	Paradise, United States	61,114	
2023	Mexico	1–0	Panama	SoFi Stadium	Inglewood, United States	72,963	
2025	Mexico	2–1	United States	NRG Stadium	Houston, United States	70,925	

== Results ==
As of 2025 final

Results by nation
Team	Winners	Runners-up	Total finals	Years won	Years runners-up
Mexico	10	2	12	1993, 1996, 1998, 2003, 2009, 2011, 2015, 2019, 2023, 2025	2007, 2021
United States	7	6	13	1991, 2002, 2005, 2007, 2013, 2017, 2021	1993, 1998, 2009, 2011, 2019, 2025
Canada	1	0	1	2000	—
Panama	0	3	3	—	2005, 2013, 2023
Brazil	0	2	2	—	1996, 2003
Jamaica	0	2	2	—	2015, 2017
Colombia	0	1	1	—	2000
Costa Rica	0	1	1	—	2002
Honduras	0	1	1	—	1991

Results by confederation
Confederation	Appearances	Winners	Runners-up
CONCACAF	33	18	15
CONMEBOL	3	0	3

== See also ==
- List of FIFA World Cup finals
- List of UEFA European Championship finals
- List of Copa América finals
- List of AFC Asian Cup finals
- List of Africa Cup of Nations finals
- List of OFC Nations Cup finals
