= 2025 CONCACAF Gold Cup final =

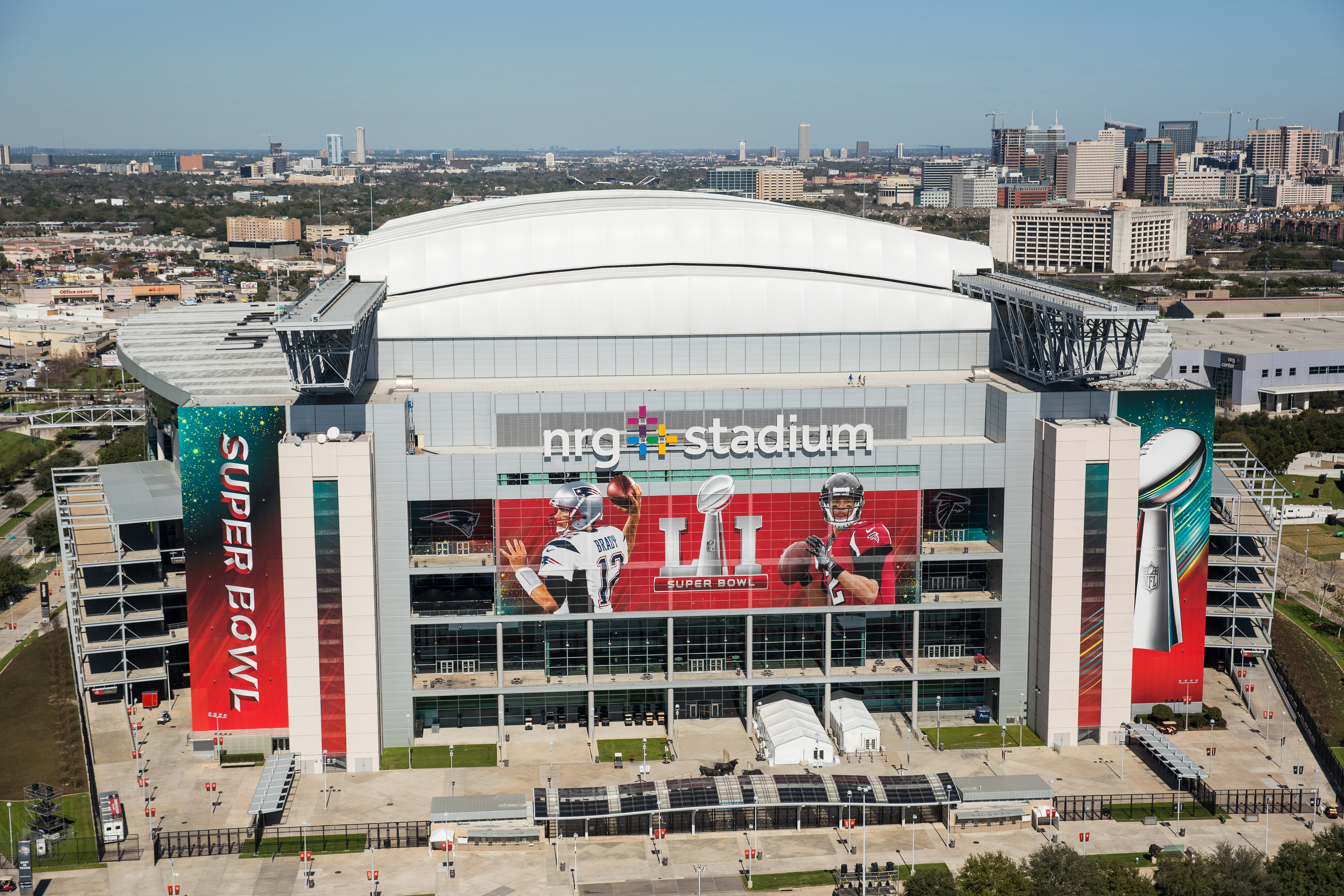
- Aerial view of NRG Stadium, the host venue for the match
- Event: 2025 CONCACAF Gold Cup
United States	Mexico
1	2
- Date: July 6, 2025
- Venue: NRG Stadium, Houston, Texas
- Man of the Match: Raúl Jiménez (Mexico)
- Referee: Mario Escobar (Guatemala)
- Attendance: 70,925
- Weather: Cloudy; 82 °F (28 °C); 69% humidity

The 2025 CONCACAF Gold Cup final was a soccer match to determine the winner of the 2025 CONCACAF Gold Cup. The match was the 18th final of the Gold Cup, a biennial tournament contested by the men's national teams representing the member associations of CONCACAF and an invited guest to decide the champion of North America, Central America, and the Caribbean. The match was held at NRG Stadium in Houston, Texas, United States, on July 6, 2025, and was contested by two rival, neighboring teams of the United States and Mexico.

Mexico won the match 2–1, securing a second consecutive and record tenth Gold Cup title overall.

== Background ==
After being eliminated in the group stage of the 2024 Copa América, US men's coach Gregg Berhalter was relieved of his duties and replaced by Argentine coach Mauricio Pochettino in September of that same year. Under Pochettino's management, the United States, who were three-time defending champions in the tournament, finished fourth place in the 2024–25 CONCACAF Nations League after being eliminated 0–1 against Panama in the semi-finals and losing 2–1 in the third-place play-off against Canada.

Mexico was the defending champion, having won its record-extending ninth title in the 2023 edition, as well as the holder of the CONCACAF Nations League, with both wins coming against Panama.

This was the eighth CONCACAF Gold Cup final to feature Mexico and the United States; Mexico triumphed in 1993, 1998, 2009, 2011, and 2019, while the US prevailed in 2007 and 2021.

=== Previous finals ===
Only counting CONCACAF Gold Cup era (1991 onwards).

Team	Previous final appearances (bold indicates winners)
United States	12 (**1991**, 1993, 1998, **2002**, **2005**, **2007**, 2009, 2011, **2013**, **2017**, 2019, **2021**)
Mexico	11 (**1993**, **1996**, **1998**, **2003**, 2007, **2009**, **2011**, **2015**, **2019**, 2021, **2023**)

== Venue ==
The final was held at NRG Stadium in Houston, Texas, United States. It was the first final to be played at the venue, which was built for the Houston Texans of the National Football League. This was the first final played in the Houston area. On October 30, 2024, CONCACAF announced that NRG Stadium would be the host venue for the final. The venue would also host matches during the 2026 FIFA World Cup. Prior to this final, the two teams had met in friendly matches at NRG in May 2003 and in February 2008, both of which ended in 0–0 and 2–2 draws.

== Route to the final ==
=== United States ===
United States' route to the final
Round	Opponent	Result
1	Trinidad and Tobago	5–0
2	Saudi Arabia	1–0
3	Haiti	2–1
QF	Costa Rica	2–2 (4–3 p)
SF	Guatemala	2–1

=== Mexico ===
Mexico's route to the final
Round	Opponent	Result
1	Dominican Republic	3–2
2	Suriname	2–0
3	Costa Rica	0–0
QF	Saudi Arabia	2–0
SF	Honduras	1–0

== Match ==
=== Details ===
July 6, 2025
19:00 (18:00 UTC−5)

United States	1–2	Mexico
Richards 4'	Report	Jiménez 27'; Ed. Álvarez 77'

NRG Stadium, Houston
Attendance: 70,925
Referee: Mario Escobar (Guatemala)

United States	Mexico

GK	25	Matt Freese
RB	16	Alex Freeman
CB	3	Chris Richards
CB	13	Tim Ream (c)
LB	18	Maximilian Arfsten		(substituted off) 86'
RM	8	Sebastian Berhalter
CM	4	Tyler Adams	(yellow card) 63'	(substituted off) 82'
CM	10	Diego Luna		(substituted off) 86'
LM	14	Luca de la Torre		(substituted off) 69'
CF	17	Malik Tillman
CF	24	Patrick Agyemang
Substitutions:
FW	9	Damion Downs		(substituted on) 69'
MF	6	Jack McGlynn		(substituted on) 82'
MF	11	Brenden Aaronson		(substituted on) 86'
DF	2	John Tolkin		(substituted on) 86'
Manager:
(Argentina) Mauricio Pochettino			(yellow card) 80'

GK	1	Luis Malagón
RB	2	Jorge Sánchez		(substituted off) 86'
CB	3	César Montes	(yellow card) 44'
CB	5	Johan Vásquez
LB	23	Jesús Gallardo
DM	4	Edson Álvarez (c)
CM	7	Gilberto Mora		(substituted off) 75'
CM	14	Marcel Ruiz
RF	25	Roberto Alvarado		(substituted off) 87'
CF	9	Raúl Jiménez	(yellow card) 85'	(substituted off) 86'
LF	10	Alexis Vega
Substitutions:
MF	17	Orbelín Pineda		(substituted on) 75'
FW	11	Santiago Giménez		(substituted on) 86'
DF	15	Israel Reyes		(substituted on) 86'
FW	21	César Huerta		(substituted on) 87'
Manager:
Javier Aguirre

Player of the Match:
Raúl Jiménez (Mexico)

Assistant referees:
Luis Ventura (Guatemala)
Humberto Panjoj (Guatemala)
Fourth official:
Walter López (Guatemala)
Reserve assistant referee:
Keytzel Corrales (Nicaragua)
Video assistant referee:
Benjamín Pineda (Costa Rica)
Assistant video assistant referee:
Yasith Monge (Costa Rica)
