= Saíd Martínez =

Honduran football referee

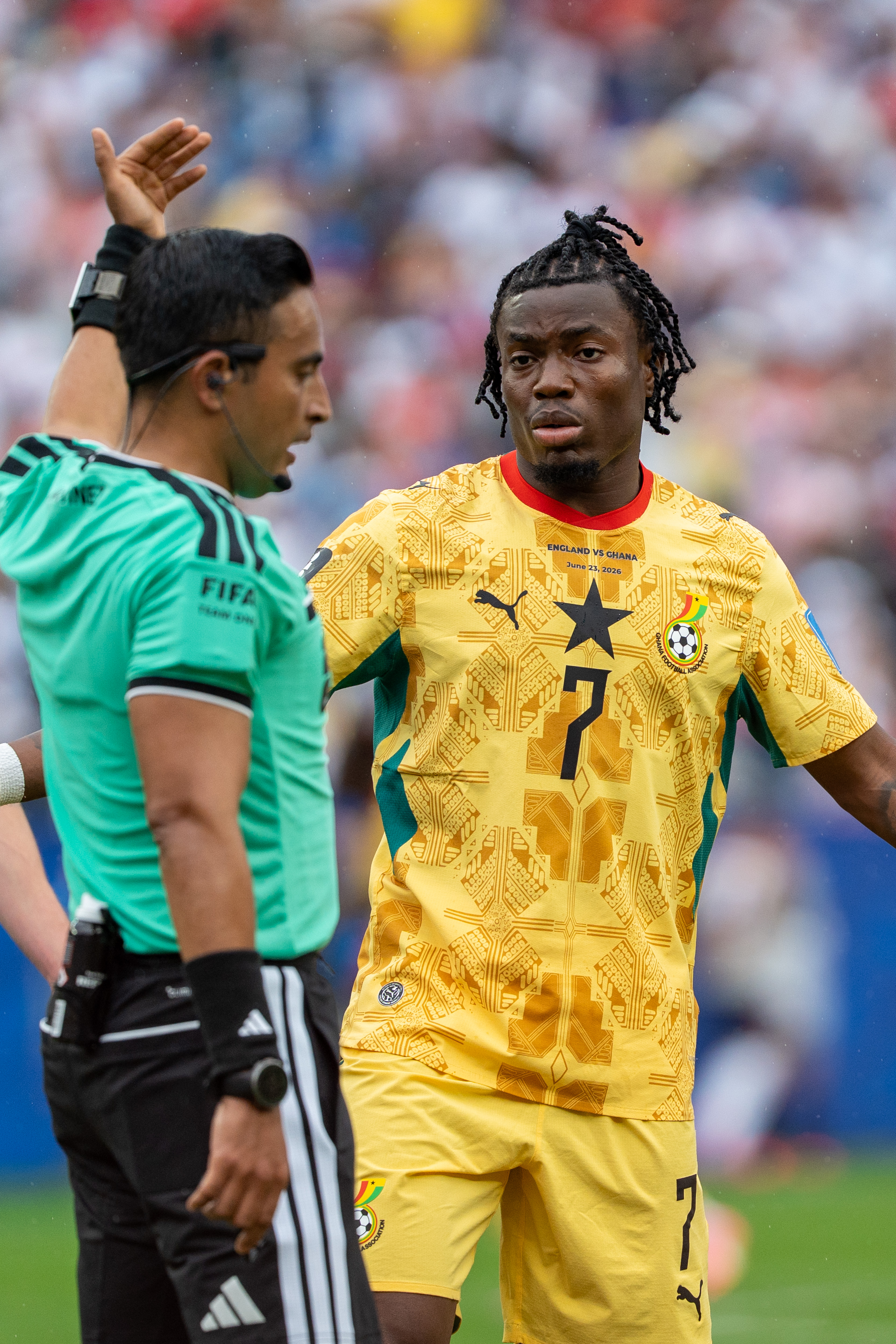
- Full name: Héctor Saíd Martínez Sorto
- Born: 7 August 1991 (age 35); Tocoa, Honduras

Domestic
Years	League	Role

International
Years	League	Role
2017–	FIFA	Referee

Héctor Saíd Martínez Sorto (born 7 August 1991) is a Honduran football referee who has been a listed international referee for FIFA since 2017. He is also one of the referees for the Liga Nacional de Fútbol de Honduras.

== Biography ==
Saíd Martínez was born in Tocoa on 7 August 1991. At the age of ten, he began the dream of being a referee with the example of his father, and made the decision in becoming a referee. With dedication and determination, he was the youngest to make his debut in football matches in the Liga Nacional de Fútbol Profesional de Honduras at just 18 years of age.

With many hopes in his professional life, he decided to move to Tegucigalpa due to the lack of opportunities in Tocoa. He entered the Francisco Morazán National Pedagogical University, where in a few years he would study mathematics, later earning him the nickname “El Matematico”.

=== Refereeing career ===
Martínez became an international referee for FIFA and CONCACAF in 2017. He officiated at the 2019 CONCACAF Gold Cup in the United States, Costa Rica and Jamaica, the CONCACAF U-20 Championship, and the 2019 FIFA U-20 World Cup in Poland.

Martínez had officiated the 2021 CONCACAF Gold Cup, including the final between the United States and Mexico. He was appointed the Gold Cup final again in 2023.

In June 2023, Martínez was chosen to referee the CONCACAF Nations League final between Canada and the United States.

In July 2023, Martinez was chosen to referee 2023 Leagues Cup games, including Lionel Messi's first match for Inter Miami against Cruz Azul.

Martinez was selected as a referee for the 2026 FIFA World Cup in North America, making him the first Honduran to be appointed as a referee at a World Cup. Martinez took charge of two group stage matches, and a round of 32 knockout match.

=== Controversy ===
On 6 June 2024, Martínez officiated a 2026 FIFA World Cup qualification – CONCACAF second round match between El Salvador and Puerto Rico. In the 76th minute, El Salvador's Jairo Henríquez made a violent studs-up challenge into the knee of Puerto Rico's Juan O'Neill. Despite being positioned close to the incident alongside fellow Honduran fourth official Nelson Salgado, Martínez only issued a yellow card. The decision drew criticism from media as a clear refereeing error, as Henríquez avoided a suspension and remained available for El Salvador's subsequent group stage matches, including the next game against Saint Vincent and the Grenadines, which he scored the opening goal in.

On 20 March 2025, Martínez was the referee for the 2024-2025 CONCACAF Nations League semi-final game between Mexico and Canada. In the 9th minute of the semi-final game between Mexico and Canada, Mexico's Edson Álvarez kicked Canada's Derek Cornelius on his foot inside Mexico's penalty box, but the Martínez did not award a penalty kick to Canada. A free kick was given in favour of Mexico instead. The VAR Benjamín Pineda did not intervene.

On 24 June 2026, Martínez was the referee in charge of the World Cup match between Ghana and England. During the 2nd half, when Ghana's Prince Adu was dribbling the ball towards England's goal, England's Ezri Konsa launched himself into the air and tackled Adu from behind inside England's penalty box. Martínez did not to award a penalty to Ghana, and the VAR Armando Villarreal chose not to intervene. Despite the controversy, Martinez was assigned a knockout round match later in the tournament.

Sporting positions
Preceded by 2019: (Guatemala) Mario Escobar	2021 CONCACAF Gold Cup final referee	Succeeded by 2023: Himself
Preceded by 2021: Himself	2023 CONCACAF Gold Cup final referee	Succeeded by 2025: (Guatemala) Mario Escobar
