= 2021 CONCACAF Gold Cup final =

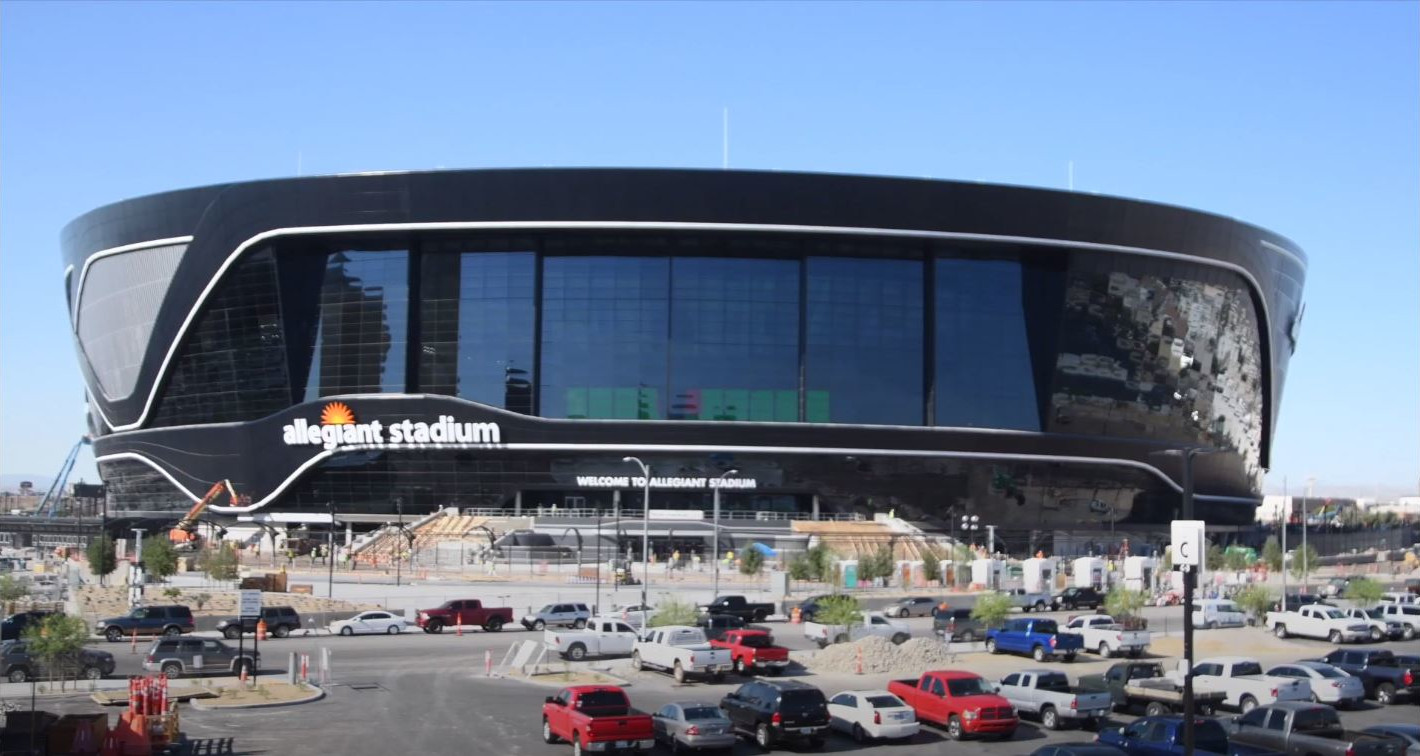
- Allegiant Stadium in Paradise hosted the final.
- Event: 2021 CONCACAF Gold Cup
United States	Mexico
(United States)	(Mexico)
1	0
- After extra time
- Date: August 1, 2021
- Venue: Allegiant Stadium, Paradise, Nevada
- Man of the Match: Matt Turner (United States)
- Referee: Saíd Martínez (Honduras)
- Attendance: 61,114
- Weather: Partly cloudy 99 °F (37 °C); 23% humidity

The 2021 CONCACAF Gold Cup final was a soccer match to determine the winners of 2021 CONCACAF Gold Cup. The match was the sixteenth final of the Gold Cup, a biennial tournament contested by the men's national teams of the member associations of CONCACAF and one invited team to decide the champion of North America, Central America, and the Caribbean. The match was held at Allegiant Stadium in Paradise, Nevada, United States, on August 1, 2021, and was contested by hosts the United States and the defending champions Mexico.

It was the seventh Gold Cup final to be contested by Mexico and the United States, and the second consecutive. From the previous six finals, Mexico won five times – in 1993, 1998, 2009, 2011, and 2019. The United States only won in 2007 prior to this match.

The United States won the final 1–0, with the lone goal scored by Miles Robinson in extra time for their seventh Gold Cup title.

== Venue ==
The final was held at Allegiant Stadium in Paradise, Nevada, United States, located in the Las Vegas metropolitan area. It was the first major international tournament to be played at the venue, which was built for the Las Vegas Raiders of the National Football League. It was also the first Gold Cup match to be played in the Las Vegas area. The match was played in front of a full-capacity crowd after the easing of COVID-19 restrictions; CONCACAF began sale of general seating tickets on June 11, 2021, and sold out their allotment within 90 minutes.

== Referee ==
The referee in charge of the match was Saíd Martínez from Honduras. Martínez, who at the time was 29, was considered amongst the best confederation referees and was appointed along assistant referees, one fellow Honduran and a Nicaraguan as linesmen. Goal.com considered the match, the most important of his international career, which began in 2017.

== Route to the final ==
United States
Round
Mexico
Opponent
Result
Group stage
Opponent
Result
Haiti
1–0
Match 1
Trinidad and Tobago
0–0
Martinique
6–1
Match 2
Guatemala
3–0
Canada
1–0
Match 3
El Salvador
1–0
Group B winners

Pos	Team	Pld	Pts
1	United States (H)	3	9
2	Canada	3	6
3	Haiti	3	3
4	Martinique	3	0

Source: CONCACAF
(H) Hosts
Final standings
Group A winners

Pos	Team	Pld	Pts
1	Mexico	3	7
2	El Salvador	3	6
3	Trinidad and Tobago	3	2
4	Guatemala	3	1

Source: CONCACAF
Opponent
Result
Knockout stage
Opponent
Result
Jamaica
1–0
Quarter-finals
Honduras
3–0
Qatar
1–0
Semi-finals
Canada
2–1

== Match ==
=== Details ===
August 1, 2021
21:00 (18:00 UTC−7)

United States	1–0 (a.e.t.)	Mexico
Robinson 117'	Report

Allegiant Stadium, Paradise
Attendance: 61,114
Referee: Saíd Martínez (Honduras)

United States	Mexico

GK	1	Matt Turner
RB	2	Reggie Cannon		(substituted off) 65'
CB	16	James Sands
CB	12	Miles Robinson
LB	21	George Bello		(substituted off) 65'
CM	19	Eryk Williamson		(substituted off) 87'
CM	23	Kellyn Acosta	(yellow card) 113'
CM	17	Sebastian Lletget		(substituted off) 66'
RF	7	Paul Arriola (c)		(substituted off) 87'
CF	9	Gyasi Zardes
LF	13	Matthew Hoppe		(substituted off) 120+1'
Substitutions:
DF	20	Shaq Moore		(substituted on) 65'
DF	3	Sam Vines		(substituted on) 65'
MF	10	Cristian Roldan		(substituted on) 66'
MF	6	Gianluca Busio		(substituted on) 87'
FW	8	Nicholas Gioacchini		(substituted on) 87'
DF	24	Henry Kessler		(substituted on) 120+1'
Head coach:
Gregg Berhalter

GK	1	Alfredo Talavera
RB	21	Luis Rodríguez
CB	2	Néstor Araujo
CB	15	Héctor Moreno (c)		(substituted off) 44'
LB	23	Jesús Gallardo	(yellow card) 114'
CM	6	Jonathan dos Santos		(substituted off) 76'
CM	4	Edson Álvarez	(yellow card) 117'
CM	16	Héctor Herrera	(yellow card) 72'
RF	17	Jesús Manuel Corona		(substituted off) 91'
CF	11	Rogelio Funes Mori		(substituted off) 106'
LF	10	Orbelín Pineda		(substituted off) 76'
Substitutions:
DF	3	Carlos Salcedo		(substituted on) 44' (substituted off) 106'
MF	14	Érick Gutiérrez		(substituted on) 76'
FW	24	Rodolfo Pizarro		(substituted on) 76'
DF	5	Osvaldo Rodríguez		(substituted on) 91'
FW	9	Alan Pulido		(substituted on) 106'
DF	19	Gilberto Sepúlveda		(substituted on) 106'
Head coach:
(Argentina) Gerardo Martino

Man of the Match:
Matt Turner (United States)

Assistant referees:
Walter López (Honduras)
Henri Pupiro (Nicaragua)
Fourth official:
Mario Escobar (Guatemala)
Reserve assistant referee:
Christian Ramírez (Honduras)
Video assistant referee:
Drew Fischer (Canada)
Assistant video assistant referee:
Tatiana Guzmán (Nicaragua)

Match rules

- 90 minutes.
- 30 minutes of extra time if necessary.
- Penalty shoot-out if scores still level.
- Maximum of twelve named substitutes.
- Maximum of five substitutions, with a sixth allowed in extra time. (Note: Each team was given only three opportunities to make substitutions during the game, with a fourth opportunity in extra time, excluding substitutions made at half-time, before the start of extra time and at half-time in extra time (Regulations Article 6.5.).)
