= Mario Escobar (referee) =

Guatemalan association football referee (born 1986)

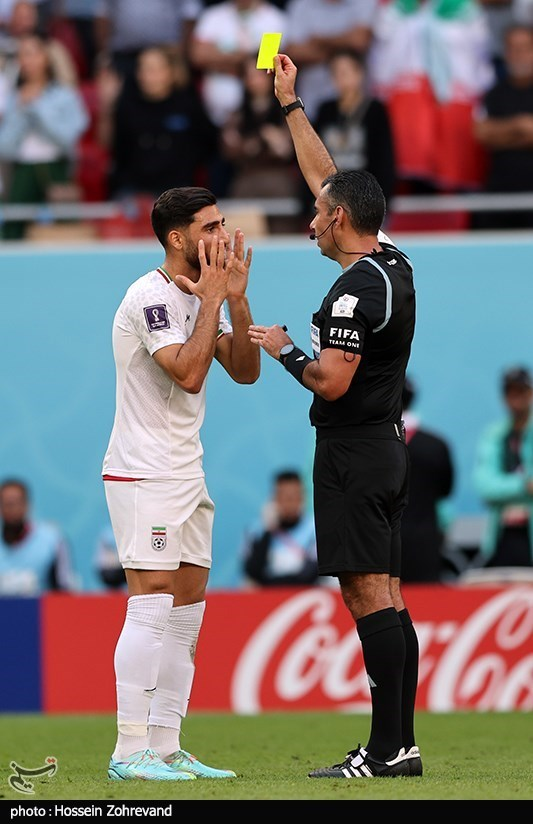
- Full name: Mario Alberto Escobar Toca
- Born: 19 September 1986 (age 40); Guatemala

Domestic
Years	League	Role

International
Years	League	Role
2013–	FIFA	Referee

Mario Alberto Escobar Toca (born 19 September 1986) is a Guatemalan football referee who is a listed international referee for FIFA since 2013. He is also one of the referees for the Liga Nacional de Fútbol de Guatemala.

On 15 May 2019, Escobar was officially selected as a referee for the 2019 CONCACAF Gold Cup in Costa Rica, Jamaica, and the United States. He was summoned to officiate the 2019 CONCACAF Gold Cup Final between Mexico and the United States, and additionally refereed the 2020 CONCACAF Champions League Final between UANL and Los Angeles FC.

Escobar was also one of the appointed referees of the 2019 FIFA U-17 World Cup in Brazil.

Sporting positions
Preceded by 2017: (Guatemala) Walter López	2019 CONCACAF Gold Cup final referee	Succeeded by 2021: (Honduras) Saíd Martínez
Preceded by 2023: (Honduras) Saíd Martínez	2025 CONCACAF Gold Cup final referee	Succeeded by 2027: TBD
