= 2002 CONCACAF Gold Cup final =

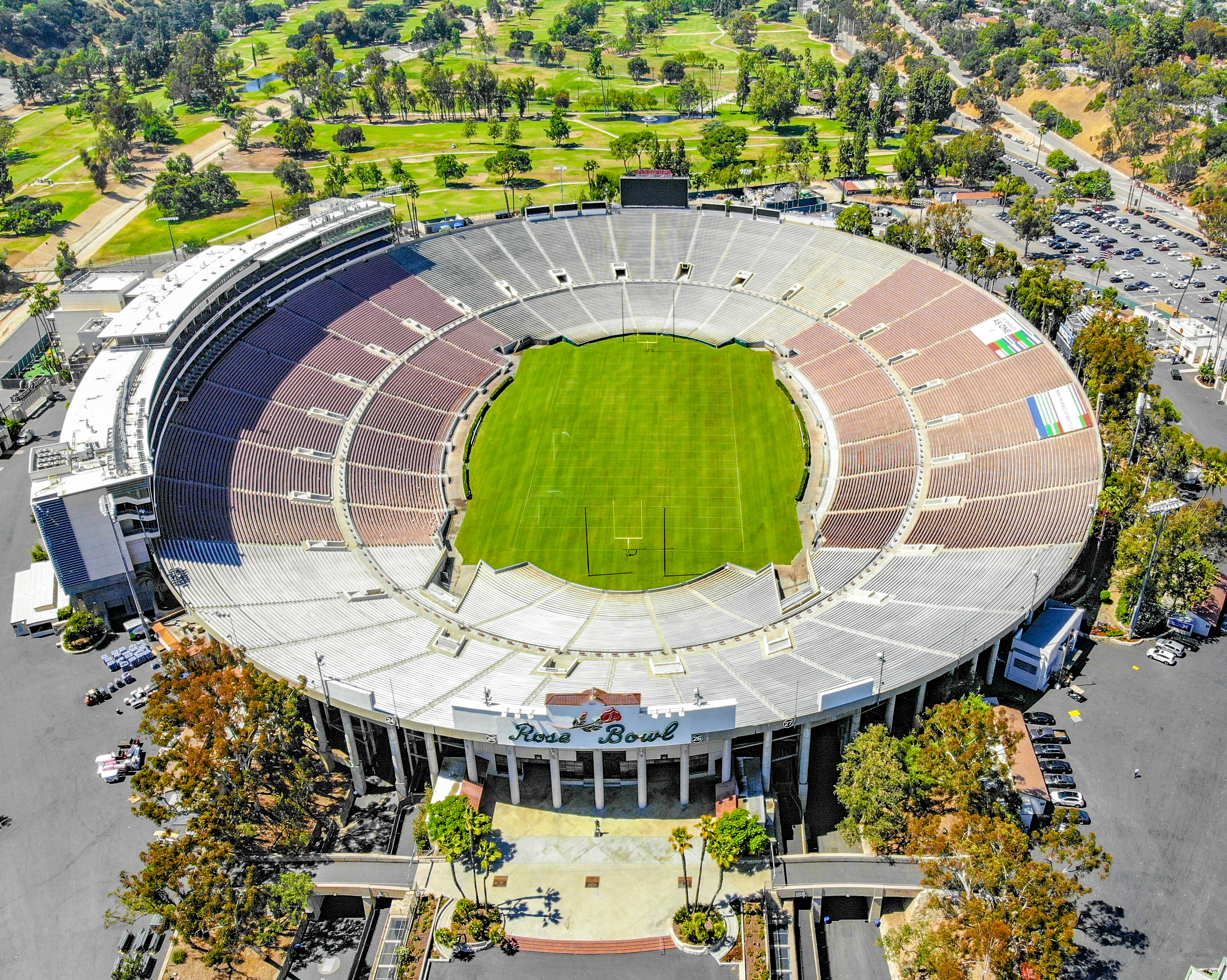
- The Rose Bowl hosted the final.
- Event: 2002 CONCACAF Gold Cup
United States	Costa Rica
(United States)	(Costa Rica)
2	0
- Date: February 2, 2002
- Venue: Rose Bowl, Pasadena, California
- Referee: Carlos Batres (Guatemala)
- Attendance: 14,432

The 2002 CONCACAF Gold Cup final was a soccer match to determine the winners of the 2002 CONCACAF Gold Cup. The match was held at the Rose Bowl in Pasadena, California, on February 2, 2002, and was contested by the winners of the semi-finals, the United States and Costa Rica. This was the first Gold Cup Final that Costa Rica has reached, and the second ever from a Central American nation; the first one was in 1991 when Honduras reached the final. The United States won 2–0 with goals from Josh Wolff and Jeff Agoos, sealing their second-ever Gold Cup victory.

== Route to the final ==
United States
Round
Costa Rica
Opponents
Result
Group stage
Opponents
Result
South Korea
2–1
Match 1
Martinique
2–0
Cuba
1–0
Match 2
Trinidad and Tobago
1–1
Group B winners

Pos	Team	Pld	Pts
1	United States	2	6
2	South Korea	2	1
3	Cuba	2	1

Final standings
Group C winners

Pos	Team	Pld	Pts
1	Costa Rica	2	4
2	Martinique	2	3
3	Trinidad and Tobago	2	1

Opponents
Result
Knockout stage
Opponents
Result
El Salvador
4–0
Quarter-finals
Haiti
2–1
Canada
0–0 (4–2 (p))
Semi-finals
South Korea
3–1

== Match ==
February 2, 2002
12:00 UTC−8

United States	2–0	Costa Rica
Wolff 37'; Agoos 63'	Report

Rose Bowl, Pasadena
Attendance: 14,432
Referee: Carlos Batres (Guatemala)

United States	Costa Rica

GK	18	Kasey Keller
DF	2	Frankie Hejduk
DF	12	Jeff Agoos
DF	17	Carlos Bocanegra
MF	7	Eddie Lewis
MF	13	Cobi Jones (c)	(substituted off) 84'
MF	14	Chris Armas (yellow card) 17'
MF	25	Pablo Mastroeni
FW	15	Josh Wolff	(substituted off) 78'
FW	20	Brian McBride	(substituted off) 89'
FW	21	Landon Donovan
Substitutions:
MF	8	Richie Williams	(substituted on) 78'
FW	9	Brian West	(substituted on) 84'
FW	5	Clint Mathis	(substituted on) 89'	(yellow card) 90'
Manager:
Bruce Arena

GK	1	Erick Lonnis
DF	3	Luis Marín	(substituted off) 46'
DF	5	Gilberto Martínez
DF	21	Reynaldo Parks (c)
DF	22	Carlos Castro	(substituted off) 71'
MF	6	Wilmer López
MF	8	Mauricio Solís
MF	15	Harold Wallace	(substituted off) 59'
MF	16	Steven Bryce (yellow card) 74'
FW	9	Paulo Wanchope
FW	11	Rónald Gómez
Substitutions:
MF	10	Walter Centeno	(substituted on) 46'
FW	17	Hernán Medford	(substituted on) 59'
FW	20	William Sunsing	(substituted on) 71'
Manager:
Alexandre Guimaraes
