= 2007 CONCACAF Gold Cup final =

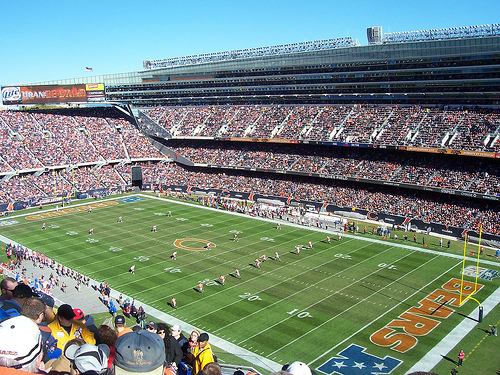
- Soldier Field hosted the final.
- Event: 2007 CONCACAF Gold Cup
| United States | Mexico |
| (United States) | (Mexico) |
| 2 | 1 |
- Date: June 24, 2007
- Venue: Soldier Field, Chicago
- Referee: Carlos Batres (Guatemala)
- Attendance: 60,000

The 2007 CONCACAF Gold Cup final was a soccer match that took place on June 24, 2007, at Soldier Field in Chicago, Illinois, United States, to determine the winner of the 2007 CONCACAF Gold Cup. The United States beat longtime rivals Mexico 2–1 to win the tournament.

== Route to the final ==
United States
Round
Mexico
Opponents
Result
Group stage
Opponents
Result
Guatemala
1–0
Match 1
Cuba
2–1
Trinidad and Tobago
2–0
Match 2
Honduras
1–2
El Salvador
4–0
Match 3
Panama
1–0
Group B winners

| Pos | Team | Pld | Pts |
|---|---|---|---|
| 1 | United States | 3 | 9 |
| 2 | Guatemala | 3 | 4 |
| 3 | El Salvador | 3 | 3 |
| 4 | Trinidad and Tobago | 3 | 1 |

Final standings
Group C runners-up

| Pos | Team | Pld | Pts |
|---|---|---|---|
| 1 | Honduras | 3 | 6 |
| 2 | Mexico | 3 | 6 |
| 3 | Panama | 3 | 4 |
| 4 | Cuba | 3 | 1 |

Opponents
Result
Knockout stage
Opponents
Result
Panama
2–1
Quarter-finals
Costa Rica
1–0 (a.e.t.)
Canada
2–1
Semi-finals
Guadeloupe
3–2

== Match ==
June 24, 2007
14:00 UTC−5

| United States | 2–1 | Mexico |
|---|---|---|
| Donovan 62' (pen.); Feilhaber 73' | Report | Guardado 44' |

Soldier Field, Chicago
Attendance: 60,000
Referee: Carlos Batres (Guatemala)
