= 1998 CONCACAF Gold Cup final =

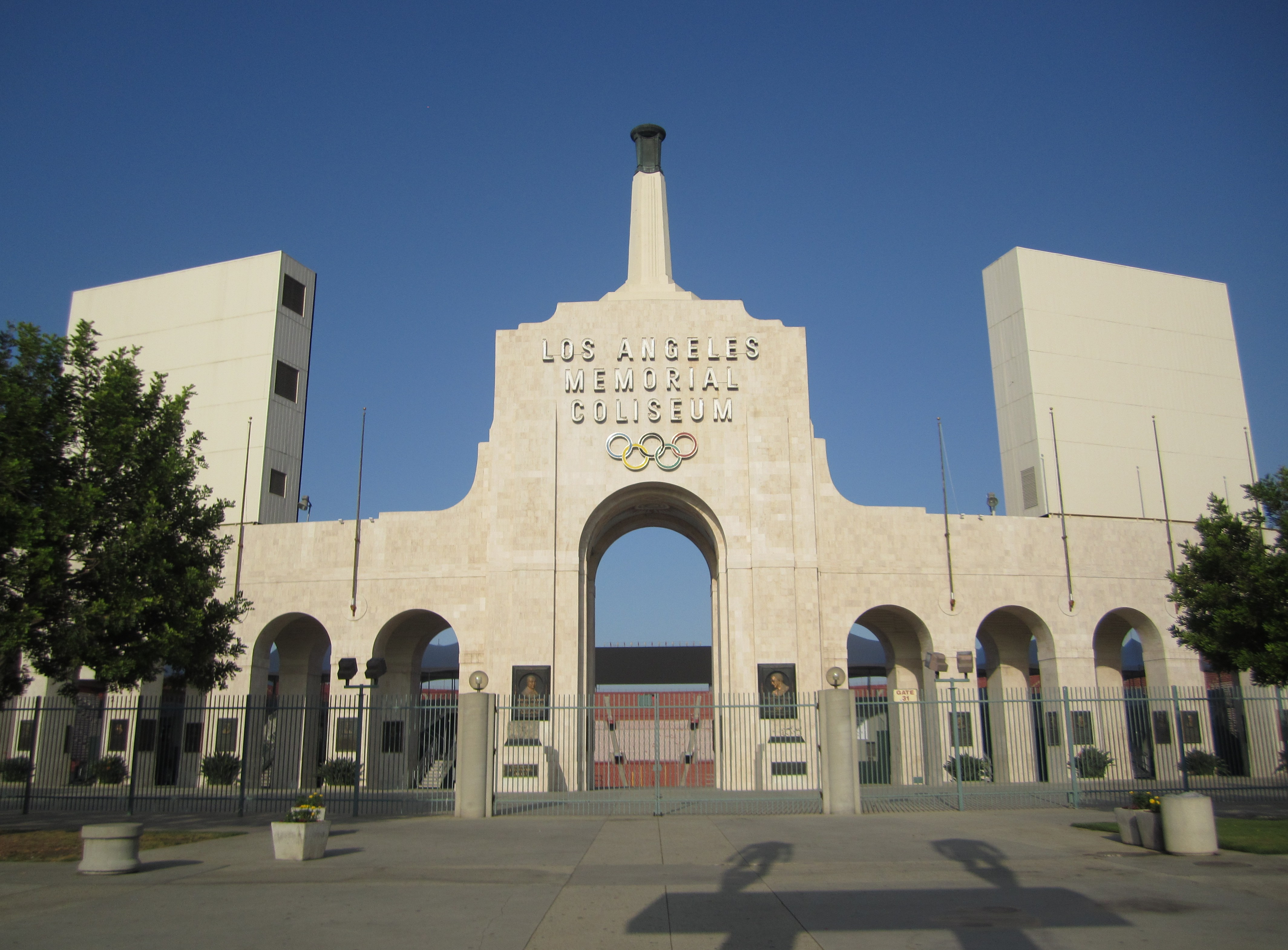
- The Los Angeles Memorial Coliseum hosted the final.
- Event: 1998 CONCACAF Gold Cup
United States	Mexico
(United States)	(Mexico)
0	1
- Date: February 15, 1998
- Venue: Los Angeles Memorial Coliseum, Los Angeles
- Referee: Ramesh Ramdhan (Trinidad and Tobago)
- Attendance: 91,255

The 1998 CONCACAF Gold Cup final was a soccer match to determine the winners of the 1998 CONCACAF Gold Cup. The match was held at the Los Angeles Memorial Coliseum in Los Angeles, United States, on February 15, 1998, and was contested by the winners of the semi-finals, the United States and Mexico. Mexico, who had won both 1993 CONCACAF Gold Cup and 1996 tournaments, successfully defended their title with a 1–0 win over North American rivals United States. A total of 91,255 fans, described as a "heavily pro-Mexico crowd", watched the match at the Los Angeles Memorial Coliseum.

Because Mexico were the hosts of the 1999 FIFA Confederations Cup, the United States qualified to the tournament as runners-up. Mexico would go on to win that tournament beating Brazil 4–3, the United States exited in the semi-finals after a 1–0 loss from an extra time golden goal from Mexico.

== Route to the final ==
United States
Round
Mexico
Opponents
Result
Group stage
Opponents
Result
Cuba
3–0
Match 1
Trinidad and Tobago
4–2
Costa Rica
2–1
Match 2
Honduras
2–0
Group C winners

Pos	Team	Pld	Pts
1	United States	2	6
2	Costa Rica	2	3
3	Cuba	2	0

Final standings
Group B winners

Pos	Team	Pld	Pts
1	Mexico	2	6
2	Trinidad and Tobago	2	3
3	Honduras	2	0

Opponents
Result
Knockout stage
Opponents
Result
Brazil
1–0
Semi-finals
Jamaica
1–0

== Match ==
=== Details ===
15 February 1998
18:00

United States	0–1	Mexico
	Report	Hernández 43'

Los Angeles Memorial Coliseum, Los Angeles
Attendance: 91,255
Referee: Ramesh Ramdhan (Trinidad and Tobago)

United States	Mexico

GK	18	Kasey Keller
DF	2	Frankie Hejduk	(substituted off) 76'
DF	3	Eddie Pope
DF	4	Mike Burns
DF	12	Jeff Agoos
DF	22	Alexi Lalas	(substituted off) 82'
MF	6	John Harkes (c)
MF	7	Roy Wegerle	(substituted off) 46'
MF	13	Cobi Jones
FW	9	Joe-Max Moore
FW	11	Eric Wynalda
Substitutes:
MF	14	Preki		(substituted on) 46'
MF	21	Claudio Reyna		(substituted on) 76'
FW	20	Brian McBride		(substituted on) 82'
Manager:
Steve Sampson

GK	1	Oscar Pérez
RB	18	Salvador Carmona
CB	2	Claudio Suárez (c)
CB	5	Duilio Davino
LB	7	Ramón Ramírez	(substituted off) 86'
RM	13	Pável Pardo
CM	4	Germán Villa
CM	14	Roberto Medina	(substituted off) 67'
LM	10	Javier Lozano	(substituted off) 56'
RF	11	Cuauhtémoc Blanco
LF	15	Luis Hernández
Substitutes:
LB	8	Braulio Luna		(substituted on) 56'
CM	6	Raúl Lara		(substituted on) 67'
LF	9	Enrique Alfaro		(substituted on) 86'
Manager:
Manuel Lapuente

Match rules

- 90 minutes.
- 30 minutes extra time if score levels after 90 minutes.
- Penalty shootout if scores still level after 120 minutes.
- Maximum of three substitutions.
