= United States men's national soccer team records and statistics =

This is a comprehensive list of the United States national soccer team's competitive, individual, team, and head-to-head records.

== Individual records ==
=== Player records ===
As of November 14, 2026.
Players in bold are still active for selection for the national team.

Most appearances
Rank	Player	Caps	Goals	Career
1	Cobi Jones	164	15	1992–2004
2	Landon Donovan	157	57	2000–2014
3	Michael Bradley	151	17	2006–2019
4	Clint Dempsey	141	57	2004–2017
5	Jeff Agoos	134	4	1988–2003
6	Marcelo Balboa	127	13	1988–2000
7	DaMarcus Beasley	126	17	2001–2017
8	Tim Howard	121	0	2002–2017
9	Jozy Altidore	115	42	2007–2019
10	Claudio Reyna	112	8	1994–2006

Top goalscorers
Rank	Player	Goals	Caps	Ratio	Career
1	Clint Dempsey (list)	57	141	0.404	2004–2017
1	Landon Donovan (list)	57	157	0.363	2000–2014
3	Jozy Altidore	42	115	0.365	2007–2019
4	**Christian Pulisic**	36	92	0.391	2016–present
5	Eric Wynalda	34	106	0.321	1990–2000
6	Brian McBride	30	95	0.316	1992–2002
7	Joe-Max Moore	24	100	0.24	1992-2002
8	Bruce Murray	21	85	0.247	1985–1993
9	Eddie Johnson	19	63	0.302	2004–2014
10	Earnie Stewart	17	101	0.168	1990–2004
10	DaMarcus Beasley	17	126	0.135	2001–2017
10	Michael Bradley	17	151	0.113	2006–2019

Top assists
Rank	Player	Assists	Caps	Ratio	Career
1	Landon Donovan	58	157	0.369	2000–2014
2	Michael Bradley	23	151	0.152	2006–2019
3	Cobi Jones	22	164	0.134	1992–2004
4	**Christian Pulisic**	21	90	0.233	2016–present
5	Claudio Reyna	19	112	0.17	1994–2006
5	Clint Dempsey	19	141	0.135	2004–2017
7	Eddie Lewis	18	82	0.22	1996–2008
8	Eric Wynalda	16	106	0.151	1990–2000
9	John Harkes	15	90	0.167	1987–2000
10	Joe-Max Moore	14	100	0.14	1992–2002

=== Coaching records ===
Most coaching appearances
Bruce Arena: 148

Most wins as coach
Bruce Arena: 81

Most losses as coach
Bora Milutinovic: 35

=== Appearances records ===
Most appearances
164 appearances Cobi Jones, 1992-2004

Most appearances started
142 appearances Landon Donovan, 2000-2014

Most consecutive appearances
36 appearances Mike Windischmann, 13 July 1988 to 21 November 1990

Most consecutive appearances started
33 appearances Mike Windischmann, 13 July 1988 to 15 September 1990

Most appearances at the FIFA World Cup
12 appearances Landon Donovan, 2002, 2006, 2010

=== Goalkeepers records ===
Most appearances
121 appearances Tim Howard, 2002-2017

Most clean sheet
47 clean sheet Kasey Keller, 1990-2007

Most saves in a match
16 saves Tim Howard vs. Belgium, July 1, 2014 (FIFA World Cup records)

=== Age records ===
Oldest USA player
39 years and 357 days Gordon Bradley vs. Israel, November 15, 1973

Oldest USA player at the FIFA World Cup
38 years and 274 days Tim Ream vs. Belgium, July 6, 2026

Oldest opponent player
40 years and 106 days Edin Džeko vs. Bosnia and Herzegovina, July 1, 2026

Youngest USA player
16 years and 234 days Freddy Adu vs. Canada, January 22, 2006

Youngest opponent player
13 years and 215 days Ralf Oehri vs. Liechtenstein, May 30, 1990

=== Goals records ===
Top goalscorer
57 goals Landon Donovan, 2000-2014
57 goals Clint Dempsey, 2004-2017

Top goalscorer at the FIFA World Cup
5 goals Landon Donovan, 2002 and 2010

First USA goal
Dick Spalding vs. Sweden, August 20, 1916 (22nd minute)

Most goals in a match
5 goals Archie Stark vs. Canada, November 8, 1925

Most goals in a match at the FIFA World Cup
3 goals Bert Patenaude vs. Paraguay, July 17, 1930

Most goals in first half
3 goals Brian McBride vs. El Salvador, December 5, 1993
3 goals Chris Wondolowski vs. Belize, July 9, 2013
3 goals Weston McKennie vs. Cuba, October 11, 2019
3 goals Jesús Ferreira vs. Trinidad and Tobago, July 2, 2023

Most goals in second half
3 goals Eddie Johnson vs. Panama, October 13, 2004
3 goals Jozy Altidore vs. Bosnia and Herzegovina, August 14, 2013
3 goals Jesús Ferreira vs. Grenada, June 10, 2022

Most goals in first half at the FIFA World Cup
2 goals Bert Patenaude vs. Paraguay, July 17, 1930
2 goals Folarin Balogun vs. Paraguay, June 12, 2026

Most goals in second half at the FIFA World Cup (22 times)
Last times: 1 goals Malik Tillman vs. Bosnia and Herzegovina, July 1, 2026

Most goals by a opponent in a match
5 goals Odd Wang Sørensen vs. Norway, August 6, 1948

Most goals by a opponent in first half
4 goals Odd Wang Sørensen vs. Norway, August 6, 1948

Most goals by a opponent in second half
4 goals Mordechai Spiegler vs. Israel, September 25, 1968

Most goals by a opponent in a match at the FIFA World Cup
3 goals Angelo Schiavio vs. Italy, May 27, 1934

Most goals by a opponent in first half at the FIFA World Cup
2 goals Angelo Schiavio vs. Italy, May 27, 1934
2 goals Charles De Ketelaere vs. Belgium, July 6, 2026

Most goals by a opponent in second half at the FIFA World Cup
2 goals Carlos Peucelle vs. Argentina, July 26, 1930
2 goals Guillermo Stábile vs. Argentina, July 26, 1930

=== Discipline ===
All-time USA soccer player sent off (34 times)
Eric Wynalda vs. Czechoslovakia, June 10, 1990 (52nd minute)
Brian Quinn vs. Saudi Arabia, October 15, 1992 (81st minute)
Fernando Clavijo vs. Brazil, July 4, 1994 (85th minute)
Matt McKeon vs. Saudi Arabia, August 3, 1999 (63rd minute)
Eddie Lewis vs. Guatemala, September 3, 2000 (69th minute)
Cobi Jones vs. Honduras, March 28, 2001 (88th minute)
Clint Mathis vs. Ecuador, March 10, 2002 (58th minute)
Frankie Hejduk vs. Mexico, April 3, 2002 (90th minute)
Cory Gibbs vs. Brazil, July 23, 2003 (98th minute)
Oguchi Onyewu vs. Jamaica, November 17, 2004 (73rd minute)
Taylor Twellman vs. Colombia, March 9, 2005 (76th minute)
Ben Olsen vs. Jamaica, July 16, 2005 (58th minute)
Bobby Convey vs. Trinidad and Tobago, August 17, 2005 (88th minute)
Carlos Bocanegra vs. Venezuela, May 26, 2006 (82nd minute)
Pablo Mastroeni vs. Italy, June 17, 2006 (45th minute)
Eddie Pope vs. Italy, June 17, 2006 (47th minute)
Oguchi Onyewu vs. Guatemala, June 7, 2007 (73rd minute)
Michael Bradley vs. Canada, June 21, 2007 (86th minute)
Pablo Mastroeni vs. Argentina, June 8, 2008 (71st minute)
Steve Cherundolo vs. Guatemala, August 20, 2008 (60th minute)
Ricardo Clark vs. Italy, June 15, 2009 (33rd minute)
Sacha Kljestan vs. Brazil, June 18, 2009 (57th minute)
Michael Bradley vs. Spain, June 24, 2009 (87th minute)
Jay Heaps vs. Mexico, July 26, 2009 (88th minute)
Jimmy Conrad vs. Honduras, January 23, 2010 (17th minute)
DeAndre Yedlin vs. Paraguay, June 11, 2016 (47th minute)
Jermaine Jones vs. Ecuador, June 16, 2016 (52nd minute)
Michael Orozco vs. Colombia, June 25, 2016 (93rd minute)
Paul Arriola vs. El Salvador, June 14, 2022 (70th minute)
Weston McKennie vs. Mexico, June 15, 2023 (71st minute)
Sergiño Dest vs. Mexico, June 15, 2023 (85th minute)
Sergiño Dest vs. Trinidad and Tobago, November 20, 2023 (39th minute)
Timothy Weah vs. Panama, June 27, 2024 (18th minute)
Folarin Balogun vs. Bosnia and Herzegovina, July 1, 2026 (64th minute)

Opponent player sent off (44 times)
Juan Manuel Funes vs. Guatemala, June 17, 1989 (86th minute)
Peter Artner vs. Austria, June 19, 1990 (34th minute)
Alberto García Aspe vs. Mexico, March 12, 1991 (84th minute)
Leonardo Araújo vs. Brazil, July 4, 1994 (43rd minute)
Ysrael Zúñiga vs. Peru, February 16, 2000 (77th minute)
Gerardo Bedoya vs. Colombia, February 19, 2000 (120th minute)
Christian Ramírez vs. Mexico, June 11, 2000 (70th minute)
Eric Lavine vs. Barbados, August 16, 2000 (41st minute)
Choi Jin-cheul vs. South Korea, January 19, 2002 (56th minute)
Marvin Benítez vs. El Salvador, January 27, 2002 (64th minute)
Alberto García Aspe vs. Mexico, April 3, 2002 (90th minute)
Rafael Márquez vs. Mexico, June 17, 2002 (88th minute)
Andrés D'Alessandro vs. Argentina, February 8, 2003 (91st minute)
Gilberto Angelucci vs. Venezuela, March 29, 2003 (86th minute)
Matt Jones vs. Wales, May 26, 2003 (48th minute)
Yann Girier-Dufournier vs. Martinique, July 14, 2003 (89th minute)
Reysander Fernández vs. Cuba, July 19, 2003 (43rd minute)
Nicolai Stokholm vs. Denmark, January 18, 2004 (84th minute)
Amado Guevara vs. Honduras, June 2, 2004 (40th minute)
Brian Benjamin vs. Grenada, June 20, 2004 (54th minute)
Dennis Alas vs. El Salvador, September 4, 2004 (27th minute)
Douglas Sequeira vs. Costa Rica, June 4, 2005 (92nd minute)
Jaime Colomé vs. Cuba, July 7, 2005 (50th minute)
Adrian Serioux vs. Canada, July 9, 2005 (82nd minute)
Jermaine Taylor vs. Jamaica, July 16, 2005 (66th minute)
Dennis Lawrence vs. Trinidad and Tobago, August 17, 2005 (41st minute)
Daniele De Rossi vs. Italy, June 17, 2006 (28th minute)
Manuel Torres vs. Panama, June 16, 2007 (76th minute)
Javier Mascherano vs. Argentina, June 8, 2008 (86th minute)
Yoel Colomé vs. Cuba, October 11, 2008 (41st minute)
Felipe Baloy vs. Panama, July 18, 2009 (120th minute)
Luis Tejada vs. Panama, July 18, 2009 (120th minute)
Antar Yahia vs. Algeria, June 23, 2010 (93rd minute)
Jermaine Taylor vs. Jamaica, June 19, 2011 (67th minute)
Antonio Valencia vs. Ecuador, June 16, 2016 (52nd minute)
Santiago Arias vs. Colombia, June 25, 2016 (94th minute)
Luis Copete vs. Nicaragua, July 15, 2017 (85th minute)
Ronald Rodríguez vs. El Salvador, June 14, 2022 (79th minute)
César Montes vs. Mexico, June 15, 2023 (69th minute)
Gerardo Arteaga vs. Mexico, June 15, 2023 (85th minute)
Noah Powder vs. Trinidad and Tobago, November 16, 2023 (38th minute)
Adalberto Carrasquilla vs. Panama, June 27, 2024 (88th minute)
Mason Holgate vs. Jamaica, November 14, 2024 (86th minute)
Rodrigo Bentancur vs. Uruguay, November 18, 2025 (64th minute)

USA soccer player sent off at the FIFA World Cup (5 times)
Eric Wynalda vs. Czechoslovakia, June 10, 1990 (52nd minute)
Fernando Clavijo vs. Brazil, July 4, 1994 (85th minute)
Pablo Mastroeni vs. Italy, June 17, 2006 (45th minute)
Eddie Pope vs. Italy, June 17, 2006 (47th minute)
Folarin Balogun vs. Bosnia and Herzegovina, July 1, 2026 (64th minute)

Opponent player sent off at the FIFA World Cup (5 times)
Peter Artner vs. Austria, June 19, 1990 (34th minute)
Leonardo Araújo vs. Brazil, July 4, 1994 (43rd minute)
Rafael Márquez vs. Mexico, June 17, 2002 (88th minute)
Daniele De Rossi vs. Italy, June 17, 2006 (28th minute)
Antar Yahia vs. Algeria, June 23, 2010 (93rd minute)

== Team records ==
=== Match records ===
Most goals
8 goals vs. Cayman Islands, November 14, 1993
8 goals vs. Barbados, June 15, 2008

Most goals on an NFL football field
7 goals vs. Barbados, August 16, 2000 (Foxboro Stadium, New England Patriots)

Most goals at the FIFA World Cup
4 goals vs. Paraguay, June 12, 2026

Most goals conceded
11 goals vs. Argentina, May 29, 1928
11 goals vs. Norway, August 6, 1948

Most goals conceded on an NFL football field
6 goals vs. France, May 7, 1979 (Giants Stadium, New York Giants and New York Jets)

Most goals conceded at the FIFA World Cup
7 goals vs. Italy, May 27, 1934

Most goals by both teams
13 goals vs. Argentina, May 29, 1928

Most goals by both teams on an NFL football field
8 goals vs. Bermuda, November 2, 1968

Most goals by both teams on a Major League Baseball ballpark
9 goals vs. England, June 8, 1953 (Yankee Stadium, New York Yankees)

Fewest goals by both teams (65 times)
Last match played: 0 goals vs. Colombia, January 28, 2023

Highest scoring draw match
3-3 vs. Mexico, November 6, 1960
3-3 vs. Israel, September 15, 1968
3-3 vs. Venezuela, June 22, 1993

Most goals by both teams at the FIFA World Cup
8 goals vs. Italy, May 27, 1934

Fewest goals by both teams at the FIFA World Cup
0 goals vs. England, November 25, 2022

Biggest victory
8–0 vs. Barbados, June 15, 2008

Biggest loss
11–0 vs. Norway, August 6, 1948

Biggest victory on an NFL field
7–0 vs. Barbados, August 16, 2000 (Foxboro Stadium, New England Patriots)

Biggest loss on an NFL field
6-0 vs. France, May 7, 1979 (Giants Stadium, New York Giants and New York Jets)

Biggest upset wins
vs. Brazil, February 10, 1998
vs. Spain, June 24, 2009
vs. Germany, June 10, 2015

Biggest upset losses
vs. North Korea, October 19, 1991

Biggest upset loss on an NFL football field
vs. North Korea, October 19, 1991 (Robert F. Kennedy Memorial Stadium, Washington Redskins)

Biggest victory at the FIFA World Cup
3–0 vs. Belgium, July 13, 1930
3–0 vs. Paraguay, July 17, 1930
4–1 vs. Paraguay, June 12, 2026

Biggest loss at the FIFA World Cup
7-1 vs. Italy, May 27, 1934

=== Comeback records ===
Largest comeback to wins the match
3 goals vs. Saudi Arabia, October 8, 1995
2 goals vs. Bosnia and Herzegovina, August 14, 2013
2 goals vs. Netherlands, June 5, 2015

Largest comeback to wins the match on NFL Football field
3 goals vs. Saudi Arabia, October 8, 1995

Largest comeback to wins the match at the FIFA World Cup
None

Largest comeback to draw the match
3 goals vs. Mexico, November 6, 1960
3 goals vs. Israel, September 15, 1968

Largest comeback to draw the match at the FIFA World Cup
2 goals vs. Slovenia, June 18, 2010

Largest blown lead to lose the match
2 goals vs. Republic of Ireland, October 29, 1979
2 goals vs. Brazil, June 28, 2009
2 goals vs. Mexico, June 25, 2011

Largest blown lead to lose the match at the FIFA World Cup
1 goals vs. Spain, June 25, 1950
1 goals vs. Turkey, June 25, 2026

Largest blown lead to draw the match
3 goals vs. Venezuela, June 22, 1993

Largest blown lead to draw the match at the FIFA World Cup
1 goals vs. Portugal, June 22, 2014
1 goals vs. Wales, November 21, 2022

=== First half records ===
Most goals
6 goals vs. Cuba, October 11, 2019

Most goals at the FIFA World Cup
3 goals vs. Portugal, June 5, 2002
3 goals vs. Paraguay, June 12, 2026

Most goals conceded
7 goals vs. Norway, August 6, 1948 (Unofficial records)
4 goals vs. Argentina, May 29, 1928
4 goals vs. Scotland, April 30, 1952
4 goals vs. Poland, March 26, 1975
4 goals vs. France, May 7, 1979
4 goals vs. Mexico, November 9, 1980
4 goals vs. Switzerland, June 10, 2025

Most goals conceded at the FIFA World Cup
3 goals vs. Italy, May 27, 1934

Most goals by both teams
6 goals vs. Cuba, October 11, 2019

Most goals by both teams at the FIFA World Cup
4 goals vs. Portugal, June 5, 2002

=== Second half records ===
Most goals
5 goals vs. Panama, October 13, 2004
5 goals vs. Barbados, June 15, 2008
5 goals vs. Guatemala, July 5, 2013
5 goals vs. Trinidad and Tobago, June 22, 2019
5 goals vs. Haiti, November 14th, 2026

Most goals at the FIFA World Cup
2 goals vs. Chile, July 2, 1950
2 goals vs. Slovenia, June 18, 2010
2 goals vs. Portugal, June 22, 2014

Most goals conceded
7 goals vs. Argentina, May 29, 1928
7 goals vs. England, May 28, 1959
7 goals vs. England, May 27, 1964

Most goals conceded on NFL Football field
5 goals vs. Mexico, July 26, 2009 (Giants Stadium, New York Giants and New York Jets)

Most goals conceded on Major League Baseball ballpark
5 goals vs. England, June 8, 1953 (Yankee Stadium, New York Yankees)

Most goals conceded at the FIFA World Cup
5 goals vs. Argentina, July 26, 1930

Most goals by both teams
9 goals vs. Argentina, May 29, 1928

Most goals by both teams on Major League Baseball ballpark
8 goals vs. England, June 8, 1953 (Yankee Stadium, New York Yankees)

Most goals by both teams at the FIFA World Cup
6 goals vs. Argentina, July 26, 1930

=== Fastest goal records ===
Fastest goal
20 seconds Shaq Moore vs. Canada, July 17, 2021
29 seconds Clint Dempsey vs. Ghana, June 16, 2014
30 seconds Weston McKennie vs. Cuba, October 11, 2019
37 seconds Josh Sargent vs. Cuba, November 19, 2019
41 seconds Landon Donovan vs. Ecuador, March 25, 2007
53 seconds Clint Dempsey vs. Barbados, June 15, 2008
59 seconds Jack McGlynn vs. Turkey, June 7, 2025

Fastest goal on NFL Football field
41 seconds Landon Donovan vs. Ecuador, March 25, 2007 (Raymond James Stadium, Tampa Bay Buccaneers)

Fastest goal at the FIFA World Cup
29 seconds Clint Dempsey vs. Ghana, June 16, 2014

Fastest goal at the CONCACAF Gold Cup
20 seconds Shaq Moore vs. Canada, July 17, 2021

Fastest goal by a opponent
30 seconds Greg Leigh vs. Jamaica, March 21, 2024
40 seconds Carlos Hermosillo vs. Mexico, April 20, 1997
59 seconds Keysher Fuller vs. Costa Rica, October 13, 2021
1st minutes Jann Sørdahl vs. Norway, August 6, 1948

Fastest goal by a opponent on NFL Football field
30 seconds Greg Leigh vs. Jamaica, March 21, 2024 (AT&T Stadium, Dallas Cowboys)
40 seconds Carlos Hermosillo vs. Mexico, April 20, 1997 (Foxboro Stadium, New England Patriots)

Fastest goals any teams on NFL Football field
30 seconds Greg Leigh vs. Jamaica, March 21, 2024 (AT&T Stadium, Dallas Cowboys)
40 seconds Carlos Hermosillo vs. Mexico, April 20, 1997 (Foxboro Stadium, New England Patriots)
41 seconds Landon Donovan vs. Ecuador, March 25, 2007 (Raymond James Stadium, Tampa Bay Buccaneers)

Fastest goal by a opponent at the FIFA World Cup
2 minutes and 43 seconds Emmanuel Olisadebe vs. Poland, June 14, 2002

Fastest goal by a opponent at the CONCACAF Gold Cup
6 minutes Arnold Dwarika vs. Trinidad and Tobago, January 13, 1996

Fastest 2 goal to start the match
4 minutes and 9 seconds vs. Cuba, October 11, 2019

Fastest 2 goal conceded to start the match
3 minutes vs. Norway, August 6, 1948 (Unofficial records)
4 minutes and 22 seconds vs. Poland, June 14, 2002

Fastest 2 goal at the FIFA World Cup
1 minutes vs. Chile, July 2, 1950

Fastest 2 goal conceded at the FIFA World Cup
1 minutes and 39 seconds vs. Poland, June 14, 2002

Fastest 3 goal to start the match
8 minutes and 6 seconds vs. Cuba, October 11, 2019

Fastest 3 goal conceded to start the match
8 minutes vs. Norway, August 6, 1948 (Unofficial records)
21 minutes vs. Mexico, November 6, 1960

=== Streak records ===
Longest winning streak
16 June 2013–April 2014

Longest unbeaten streak
32 September 2001–March 2005

Longest losing streak
7 2016–2017

Longest winless streak
14 1935–1949

Longest winning streak at the FIFA World Cup
2 July 13, 1930-July 17, 1930
2 June 12, 2026-June 19, 2026

Longest unbeaten streak at the FIFA World Cup
3 June 12, 2010-June 23, 2010

Longest losing streak at the FIFA World Cup
5 June 26, 1994-June 25, 1998

Longest winless streak at the FIFA World Cup
6 June 21, 2002-June 23, 2010

Longest goalless streak
540 minutes October 10, 1990-March 12 1991

Most consecutive minutes without conceding a goal
581 minutes June 4, 2008-October 11, 2008

Longest goalless streak by both teams
298 minutes November 10, 1976-November 14 1976

Longest goalless streak at the FIFA World Cup
404 minutes June 22, 1994-June 21, 1998

Most consecutive minutes without conceding a goal at the FIFA World Cup
199 minutes July 13, 1930-July 26, 1930

Longest goalless streak by both teams at the FIFA World Cup
135 minutes November 21, 2022-November 29, 2022

Longest winning streak, single opponent
12 Cuba, 1949–current

Longest unbeaten streak, single opponent
21 El Salvador, 1993–current

Longest losing streak, single opponent
11 Brazil, 1999–2018

Longest winless streak, single opponent
24 Mexico, 1937–1980

== Competition records ==
The U.S. regularly competes at the FIFA World Cup, the CONCACAF Gold Cup, and the Summer Olympics. The U.S. has also played in the FIFA Confederations Cup, Copa América by invitation, as well as several minor tournaments.

The best result for the United States in a World Cup tournament came in 1930 when the team reached the semifinals. The team was composed of six naturalized internationals, five of them from Scotland and one from England. The best result in the modern era is the 2002 World Cup, when the U.S. reached the quarterfinals. The worst world Cup tournament results in the modern era were group stage eliminations in 1990, 1998, and 2006, although the country failed to even qualify for the final tournament in 2018.

In the Confederations Cup, the United States finished in third place in both 1992 and 1999, and were runner-up in 2009. The United States appeared in their first intercontinental tournament final at the 2009 Confederations Cup. In the semifinals, the United States upset top ranked Spain 2–0, to advance to the final. In the final, the United States lost 3–2 to Brazil after leading 2–0 at halftime.

The U.S. men's soccer team have played in the Summer Olympics since 1924. From that tournament to 1980, only amateur and state-sponsored Eastern European players were allowed on Olympic teams. The Olympics became a full international tournament in 1984 after the IOC allowed full national teams from outside FIFA CONMEBOL & UEFA confederations. Ever since 1992 the men's Olympic event has been age-restricted, under 23 plus three overage players, and participation has been by the United States men's national under-23 soccer team.

In regional competitions, the United States has won the CONCACAF Gold Cup seven times, with their most recent title in 2021. Their best ever finish at the Copa América was fourth-place at the 1995 and 2016 editions.

=== FIFA World Cup ===
FIFA World Cup record										Qualification record					
Year	Result	Position	Pld	W	D	L	GF	GA	Squad	Pld	W	D	L	GF	GA
(Uruguay) 1930	Third place (Note: The United States earned 3rd place over the loser of the other semifinal, Yugoslavia, because of a better goal differential (+1 to Yugoslavia's 0). No third place match was played. "1930 FIFA World Cup Uruguay 1930". FIFA.com.)	3rd	3	2	0	1	7	6	Squad	Qualified as invitees					
(Italy) 1934	Round of 16	16th	1	0	0	1	1	7	Squad	1	1	0	0	4	2
(France) 1938	Withdrew									Withdrew					
(Brazil) 1950	Group stage	10th	3	1	0	2	4	8	Squad	4	1	1	2	8	15
(Switzerland) 1954	Did not qualify									4	2	0	2	7	9
(Sweden) 1958	Did not qualify									4	0	0	4	5	21
(Chile) 1962	Did not qualify									2	0	1	1	3	6
(England) 1966	Did not qualify									4	1	2	1	4	5
(Mexico) 1970	Did not qualify									6	3	0	3	11	9
(West Germany) 1974	Did not qualify									4	0	1	3	6	10
(Argentina) 1978	Did not qualify									5	1	2	2	3	7
(Spain) 1982	Did not qualify									4	1	1	2	4	8
(Mexico) 1986	Did not qualify									6	3	2	1	8	3
(Italy) 1990	Group stage	23rd	3	0	0	3	2	8	Squad	10	5	4	1	11	4
(United States) 1994	Round of 16	14th	4	1	1	2	3	4	Squad	Qualified as hosts					
(France) 1998	Group stage	32nd	3	0	0	3	1	5	Squad	16	8	6	2	27	14
(South Korea) (Japan) 2002	Quarter-finals	8th	5	2	1	2	7	7	Squad	16	8	4	4	25	11
(Germany) 2006	Group stage	25th	3	0	1	2	2	6	Squad	18	12	4	2	35	11
(South Africa) 2010	Round of 16	12th	4	1	2	1	5	5	Squad	18	13	2	3	42	16
(Brazil) 2014	Round of 16	15th	4	1	1	2	5	6	Squad	16	11	2	3	26	14
(Russia) 2018	Did not qualify									16	7	4	5	37	16
(Qatar) 2022	Round of 16	14th	4	1	2	1	3	4	Squad	14	7	4	3	21	10
(Canada) (Mexico) (United States) 2026	Round of 16	12th	5	3	0	2	11	8	Squad	Qualified as co-hosts					
(Morocco) (Portugal) (Spain) 2030	To be determined									To be determined					
(Saudi Arabia) 2034	To be determined									To be determined					
Total	Third place	12/23	42	12	8	22	51	74	—	168	84	40	44	287	191

*Draws include knockout matches decided via penalty shoot-out

FIFA World Cup history
First match	United States 3–0 Belgium (July 13, 1930; Montevideo, Uruguay)
Biggest win	United States 3–0 Belgium (July 13, 1930; Montevideo, Uruguay); United States 3–0 Paraguay (July 17, 1930; Montevideo, Uruguay); United States 4–1 Paraguay (June 12, 2026; Inglewood, United States)
Biggest defeat	Italy 7–1 United States (May 27, 1934; Rome, Italy)
Best result	Third place at the 1930 FIFA World Cup
Second-best result	8th place at the 2002 FIFA World Cup
Worst result	32nd place at the 1998 FIFA World Cup
Second-worst result	25th place at the 2006 FIFA World Cup

=== CONCACAF Gold Cup ===
CONCACAF Championship 1963–1989, CONCACAF Gold Cup 1991–present

CONCACAF Gold Cup record
Year	Result	Position	Pld	W	D	L	GF	GA
(El Salvador) 1963	Did not enter							
(Guatemala) 1965	Did not enter							
(Honduras) 1967	Did not enter							
(Costa Rica) 1969	Did not qualify							
(Trinidad and Tobago) 1971	Did not enter							
(Haiti) 1973	Did not qualify							
(Mexico) 1977	Did not qualify							
(Honduras) 1981	Did not qualify							
1985	Group stage	6th	4	2	1	1	4	3
1989	Runners-up	2nd	8	4	3	1	6	3
(United States) 1991	Champions	1st	5	4	1	0	10	3
(Mexico) (United States) 1993	Runners-up	2nd	5	4	0	1	5	5
(United States) 1996	Third place	3rd	4	3	0	1	8	3
(United States) 1998	Runners-up	2nd	4	3	0	1	6	2
(United States) 2000	Quarterfinals	5th	3	2	1	0	6	2
(United States) 2002	Champions	1st	5	4	1	0	9	1
(Mexico) (United States) 2003	Third place	3rd	5	4	0	1	13	4
(United States) 2005	Champions	1st	6	4	2	0	11	3
(United States) 2007	Champions	1st	6	6	0	0	13	3
(United States) 2009	Runners-up	2nd	6	4	1	1	12	8
(United States) 2011	Runners-up	2nd	6	4	0	2	9	6
(United States) 2013	Champions	1st	6	6	0	0	20	4
(Canada) (United States) 2015	Fourth place	4th	6	3	2	1	12	5
(United States) 2017	Champions	1st	6	5	1	0	13	4
(Costa Rica) (Jamaica) (United States) 2019	Runners-up	2nd	6	5	0	1	15	2
(United States) 2021	Champions	1st	6	6	0	0	11	1
(Canada) (United States) 2023	Semifinals	4th	5	2	3	0	16	4
(Canada) (United States) 2025	Runners-up	2nd	6	5	0	1	13	6
Total	20/28	7 titles	108	80	16	12	212	72

CONCACAF Championship & Gold Cup history
First match	Trinidad and Tobago 1–2 United States (May 15, 1985; St. Louis, United States)
Biggest Win	United States 6–0 Cuba (July 18, 2015; Baltimore, United States); United States 6–0 Trinidad and Tobago (June 22, 2019; Cleveland, United States); United States 6–0 Saint Kitts and Nevis (June 28, 2023; St. Louis, United States); United States 6–0 Trinidad and Tobago (July 2, 2023; Charlotte, United States)
Biggest Defeat	United States 0–5 Mexico (July 26, 2009; East Rutherford, United States)
Best Result	Champions in 1991, 2002, 2005, 2007, 2013, 2017, 2021
Worst Result	Group stage in 1985

=== Summer Olympics ===
Summer Olympics record
Year	Result	Position	Pld	W	D	L	GF	GA
(Greece) 1896	No soccer tournament							
(France) 1900	Did not enter							
(United States) 1904	Silver medalists	2nd	3	1	1	1	2	7
(United States) 1904	Bronze medalists	3rd	3	0	1	2	0	6
(United Kingdom) 1908	Did not enter							
(Sweden) 1912	Did not enter							
(Belgium) 1920	Did not enter							
(France) 1924	Round of 16	12th	2	1	0	1	1	3
(Netherlands) 1928	Round of 16	14th	1	0	0	1	2	11
(United States) 1932	No soccer tournament							
(Germany) 1936	Round of 16	9th	1	0	0	1	0	1
(United Kingdom) 1948	Round of 16	11th	1	0	0	1	0	9
(Finland) 1952	Round of 32	17th	1	0	0	1	0	8
(Australia) 1956	Quarterfinals	8th	1	0	0	1	1	9
(Italy) 1960	Did not qualify							
(Japan) 1964	Did not qualify							
(Mexico) 1968	Did not qualify							
(West Germany) 1972	Group stage	14th	3	0	1	2	0	10
(Canada) 1976	Did not qualify							
(Soviet Union) 1980	Qualified, later withdrew							
(United States) 1984	Group stage	9th	3	1	1	1	4	2
(South Korea) 1988	Group stage	12th	3	0	2	1	3	5
Since 1992	See United States men's national under-23 soccer team							
Total	–	2nd	22	3	6	13	13	71

=== Copa América ===
South American Championship 1916–1967, Copa América 1975–present

Copa América record
Year	Result	Position	Pld	W	D	L	GF	GA
1916–1991	Not invited							
(Ecuador) 1993	Group stage	12th	3	0	1	2	3	6
(Uruguay) 1995	Fourth place	4th	6	2	1	3	6	7
1997–2004	Not invited							
(Venezuela) 2007	Group stage	12th	3	0	0	3	2	8
2011–2015	Not invited							
(United States) 2016	Fourth place	4th	6	3	0	3	7	8
2019–2021	Not invited							
(United States) 2024	Group stage	11th	3	1	0	2	3	3
Total	Invitation	0 titles	21	6	2	13	21	32

=== FIFA Confederations Cup ===
FIFA Confederations Cup record
Year	Result	Position	Pld	W	D	L	GF	GA
(Saudi Arabia) 1992	Third place	3rd	2	1	0	1	5	5
(Saudi Arabia) 1995	Did not qualify							
(Saudi Arabia) 1997	Did not qualify							
(Mexico) 1999	Third place	3rd	5	3	0	2	6	3
(South Korea) (Japan) 2001	Did not qualify							
(France) 2003	Group stage	7th	3	0	1	2	1	3
(Germany) 2005	Did not qualify							
(South Africa) 2009	Runners-up	2nd	5	2	0	3	8	9
(Brazil) 2013	Did not qualify							
(Russia) 2017	Did not qualify							
Total	Runners-up	4/10	15	6	1	8	20	20

FIFA Confederations Cup history
First match	Saudi Arabia 3–0 United States (October 15, 1992; Riyadh, Saudi Arabia)
Biggest Win	United States 5–2 Ivory Coast (October 19, 1992; Riyadh, Saudi Arabia)
Biggest Defeat	Saudi Arabia 3–0 United States (October 15, 1992; Riyadh, Saudi Arabia); United States 0–3 Brazil (June 18, 2009; Pretoria, South Africa)
Best Result	Runners-up in 2009
Worst Result	Group stage in 2003

=== CONCACAF Nations League ===
CONCACAF Nations League record
League phase												Playoff phase								
Season	Division	Group	Pos.	Pld	W	D	L	GF	GA	P/R	Rank	Finals	Result	Pld	W	D	L	GF	GA	Squad
2019–20	A	A	1st	4	3	0	1	15	3	Same position	3rd	(United States) 2021	Champions	2	2	0	0	4	2	Squad
2022–23	A	D	1st	4	3	1	0	14	2	Same position	1st	(United States) 2023	Champions	2	2	0	0	5	0	Squad
2023–24	Bye									Same position	N/A	(United States) 2024	Champions	4	3	0	1	9	3	Squad
2024–25	Bye									Same position	N/A	(United States) 2025	Fourth place	4	2	0	2	6	5	Squad
Total	—	—	—	8	6	1	1	29	5	—	—	Total	3 Titles	12	9	0	3	24	10	—

CONCACAF Nations League history
First match	United States 7–0 Cuba (October 11, 2019; Washington, D.C., United States)
Biggest Win	United States 7–0 Cuba (October 11, 2019; Washington, D.C., United States)
Biggest Defeat	Canada 2–0 United States (October 15, 2019; Toronto, Canada)
Best Result	Champions in 2019−20, 2022–23, 2023–24
Worst Result	Fourth place in 2024−25

== Head-to-head record ==
The following tables summarizes the all-time record for the United States men's national soccer team, first broken down by confederation and then the team's head-to-head record by decade. The United States has played matches against 106 current and former national teams, with the latest result, a win, coming against Haiti on November 17, 2026.

Key
Positive balance (more wins)
Neutral balance (wins = losses)
Negative balance (more losses)

As of United States vs. Haiti on November 17, 2026.

=== AFC (23–14–9) ===
Opponent	Played	Won	Lost	Drawn	Goals for	Goals against	Goal difference	Ratio
Australia	5	3	1	1	7	3	+4	0.700
China	8	5	1	2	17	7	+10	0.750
Iran	3	1	1	1	3	3	0	0.500
Japan	4	2	2	0	6	7	–1	0.500
Kuwait	1	1	0	0	2	0	+2	1.000
North Korea	1	0	1	0	1	2	–1	0.000
Oman	1	1	0	0	4	0	+4	1.000
Qatar	1	1	0	0	1	0	+1	1.000
Saudi Arabia	8	4	2	2	10	8	+2	0.625
South Korea	12	3	6	3	8	12	–4	0.375
Thailand	1	1	0	0	1	0	+1	1.000
Uzbekistan	1	1	0	0	3	0	+3	1.000
Total	46	23	14	9	63	42	+21	0.597

=== CAF (13–6–2) ===
Opponent	Played	Won	Lost	Drawn	Goals for	Goals against	Goal difference	Win ratio
Algeria	1	1	0	0	1	0	+1	1.000
Cameroon	1	0	0	1	0	0	0	0.500
Egypt	2	1	1	0	4	3	+1	0.500
Ghana	5	3	2	0	10	6	+4	0.600
Ivory Coast	1	1	0	0	5	2	+3	1.000
Morocco	4	1	3	0	5	6	–1	0.250
Nigeria	2	2	0	0	5	3	+2	1.000
Senegal	1	1	0	0	3	2	+1	1.000
South Africa	3	3	0	0	6	0	+6	1.000
Tunisia	1	0	0	1	1	1	0	0.500
Total	21	13	6	2	40	23	+17	0.705

=== CONCACAF (235–97–83) ===
Opponent	Played	Won	Lost	Drawn	Goals for	Goals against	Goal difference	Win ratio
Antigua and Barbuda	2	2	0	0	5	2	+3	1.000
Barbados	4	4	0	0	20	0	+20	1.000
Belize	1	1	0	0	6	1	+5	1.000
Bermuda	8	6	2	0	15	9	+6	0.750
Canada	43	18	12	13	68	48	+20	0.570
Cayman Islands	1	1	0	0	8	1	+7	1.000
Costa Rica	44	20	17	7	54	50	+4	0.534
Cuba	14	12	1	1	51	11	+40	0.893
Curaçao	1	1	0	0	1	0	+1	1.000
El Salvador	28	20	1	7	63	16	+47	0.839
Grenada	5	5	0	0	22	3	+19	1.000
Guadeloupe	1	1	0	0	1	0	+1	1.000
Guatemala	28	17	5	6	49	20	+29	0.714
Guyana	1	1	0	0	4	0	+4	1.000
Haiti	21	10	6	5	34	20	+14	0.595
Honduras	28	19	4	5	54	24	+30	0.768
Jamaica	35	22	3	10	61	24	+37	0.771
Martinique	3	3	0	0	11	3	+8	1.000
Mexico	80	25	38	17	96	149	–53	0.419
Netherlands Antilles	2	1	0	1	4	0	+4	0.750
Nicaragua	1	1	0	0	3	0	+3	1.000
Panama	29	18	4	7	56	20	+36	0.741
Puerto Rico	1	1	0	0	3	1	+2	1.000
Saint Kitts and Nevis	1	1	0	0	6	0	+6	1.000
Saint Vincent and the Grenadines	2	2	0	0	12	1	+11	1.000
Trinidad and Tobago	31	23	4	4	68	15	+53	0.807
Total	415	235	97	83	775	418	+357	0.849

=== CONMEBOL (35–59–31) ===
Opponent	Played	Won	Lost	Drawn	Goals for	Goals against	Goal difference	Win ratio
Argentina	11	2	7	2	9	34	–25	0.273
Bolivia	9	3	2	4	12	6	+6	0.556
Brazil	20	1	18	1	13	42	–29	0.075
Chile	12	4	5	3	18	24	–6	0.458
Colombia	22	3	14	5	15	32	–17	0.250
Ecuador	16	5	5	6	12	13	–1	0.500
Paraguay	10	6	2	2	16	8	+8	0.700
Peru	8	4	2	2	12	8	+4	0.625
Uruguay	10	3	3	4	12	11	+1	0.500
Venezuela	7	4	1	2	12	8	+4	0.714
Total	125	35	59	31	131	186	–55	0.441

=== OFC (2–0–2) ===
Opponent	Played	Won	Lost	Drawn	Goals for	Goals against	Goal difference	Win ratio
New Zealand	4	2	0	2	6	4	+2	0.750

=== UEFA (59–105–44) ===
Opponent	Played	Won	Lost	Drawn	Goals for	Goals against	Goal difference	Win ratio
Armenia	1	1	0	0	1	0	+1	1.000
Austria	3	1	2	0	4	3	+1	0.333
Azerbaijan	1	1	0	0	2	0	+2	1.000
Belgium	8	1	7	0	9	19	–10	0.125
Bosnia and Herzegovina	4	3	0	1	7	3	+4	0.875
CIS	2	1	1	0	2	2	0	0.500
Croatia	1	0	1	0	1	2	–1	0.000
Czech Republic	3	1	2	0	3	7	–4	0.333
Czechoslovakia	1	0	1	0	1	5	–4	0.000
Denmark	7	1	3	3	10	14	–4	0.357
East Germany	2	0	2	0	2	3	–1	0.000
England	12	2	8	2	9	39	–30	0.250
Estonia	2	2	0	0	5	0	+5	1.000
Finland	1	1	0	0	2	1	+1	1.000
France	4	0	3	1	1	11	–10	0.125
Germany	13	4	9	0	19	28	–9	0.308
Greece	1	0	0	1	1	1	0	0.500
Hungary	3	1	1	1	2	2	0	0.500
Iceland	7	3	2	2	12	9	+3	0.571
Israel	6	2	3	1	9	14	–5	0.417
Italy	9	1	5	3	5	25	–20	0.278
Latvia	1	1	0	0	1	0	+1	1.000
Liechtenstein	1	1	0	0	4	1	+3	1.000
Luxembourg	1	1	0	0	2	0	+2	1.000
Malta	1	1	0	0	1	0	+1	1.000
Moldova	2	1	0	1	4	1	+3	0.750
Netherlands	6	1	5	0	6	13	–7	0.167
North Macedonia	1	0	0	1	0	0	0	0.500
Northern Ireland	2	1	1	0	2	6	–4	0.500
Norway	5	2	2	1	8	14	–6	0.500
Poland	17	7	7	3	22	36	–14	0.500
Portugal	8	2	3	3	8	10	–2	0.438
Republic of Ireland	10	2	6	2	14	22	–8	0.300
Romania	4	1	2	1	4	4	0	0.375
Russia	5	0	2	3	3	6	–3	0.300
Scotland	7	2	2	3	8	14	–6	0.500
Serbia	2	0	1	1	1	2	–1	0.250
Slovakia	1	0	1	0	0	1	–1	0.000
Slovenia	3	1	1	1	5	5	0	0.500
Soviet Union	4	0	3	1	3	10	–7	0.125
Spain	5	1	4	0	3	10	–7	0.200
Sweden	7	4	3	0	10	9	+1	0.571
Switzerland	10	1	5	4	7	15	–8	0.300
Turkey	6	2	3	1	9	10	–1	0.417
Ukraine	4	0	3	1	1	5	–4	0.125
Wales	3	1	0	2	3	1	+2	0.667
Yugoslavia	1	0	1	0	0	1	–1	0.000
Total	207	59	105	44	236	384	–148	0.463

Total Record
Played	Won	Lost	Drawn	Goals for	Goals against	Goal difference	Win ratio
812	359	278	175	1,228	1,046	+182	0.613

=== Record timeline ===
Legend
0–0–0	Win–loss–tie
0/0/0	GF–GA–GD
*	No games played
—	Defunct team

- Win %: number of wins divided by number of games played (ties each count as half of a win)

Nation	1916–1949	1950–1959	1960–1969	1970–1979	1980–1989	1990–1999	2000–2009	2010–2019	2020–2029	Totals	Games Played	Win %	Goals
Algeria	*	*	*	*	*	*	*	1–0–0	*	1–0–0	1	1.000	1/0/+1
Antigua and Barbuda	*	*	*	*	*	*	*	2–0–0	*	2–0–0	2	1.000	5/2/+3
Argentina	0–2–0	*	*	0–1–0	*	2–1–0	0–2–1	0–1–1	*	2–7–2	11	0.273	9/34/–25
Armenia	*	*	*	*	*	1–0–0	*	*	*	1–0–0	1	1.000	1/0/+1
Australia	*	*	*	*	*	0–1–1	*	1–0–0	2–0–0	5–1–1	5	0.700	7/3/+4
Austria	*	*	*	*	*	1–1–0	*	0–1–0	*	1–2–0	3	0.333	4/3/+1
Azerbaijan	*	*	*	*	*	*	*	1–0–0	*	1–0–0	1	1.000	2/0/+2
Barbados	*	*	*	*	*	*	4–0–0	*	*	4–0–0	4	1.000	20/0/+20
Belgium	1–0–0	*	*	*	*	0–2–0	*	0–3–0	0–2–0	1–7–0	8	0.125	9/19/–10
Belize	*	*	*	*	*	*	*	1–0–0	*	1–0–0	1	1.000	6/1/+5
Bermuda	*	*	2–0–0	2–1–0	1–0–0	1–1–0	*	*	*	6–2–0	8	0.750	15/9/+6
Bolivia	*	*	*	*	*	0–2–4	*	2–0–0	1–0–0	3–2–4	9	0.556	12/6/+6
Bosnia and Herzegovina	*	*	*	*	*	*	*	1–0–1	2–0–0	3–0–1	4	0.875	7/3/+4
Brazil	0–1–0	*	*	*	*	1–7–0	0–6–0	0–4–0	0–0–1	1–18–1	20	0.075	13/42/–29
Cameroon	*	*	*	*	*	*	0–0–1	*	*	0–0–1	1	0.500	0/0/0
Canada	2–1–0	0–2–0	1–1–0	2–2–2	0–2–3	4–0–2	3–0–2	3–1–2	3–3–2	18–12–13	43	0.570	68/48/+20
Cayman Islands	*	*	*	*	*	1–0–0	*	*	*	1–0–0	1	1.000	8/1/+7
Chile	*	0–1–0	*	*	0–2–1	2–1–0	1–0–0	0–1–2	1–0–0	4–5–3	12	0.458	18/24/–6
China	*	*	*	2–0–1	*	1–1–1	2–0–0	*	*	5–1–2	8	0.750	17/7/+10
CIS	*	*	*	*	*	1–1–0	—	—	—	1–1–0	2	0.500	2/2/0
Colombia	*	*	0–1–0	*	1–2–0	1–4–2	1–2–1	0–4–1	0–1–1	3–14–5	22	0.250	15/32/–17
Costa Rica	*	*	*	0–1–0	2–2–1	5–4–2	4–4–3	5–5–0	4–1–1	20–17–7	44	0.534	54/50/+4
Côte d'Ivoire	*	*	*	*	*	1–0–0	*	*	*	1–0–0	1	1.000	5/2/+3
Croatia	*	*	*	*	*	0–1–0	*	*	*	0–1–0	1	0.000	1/2/–1
Cuba	1–1–1	*	*	*	*	1–0–0	5–0–0	5–0–0	*	12–1–1	14	0.893	51/11/+40
Curaçao	*	*	*	*	*	*	*	1–0–0	*	1–0–0	1	1.000	1/0/+1
Czech Republic	*	*	*	*	*	*	0–1–0	1–1–0	*	1–2–0	3	0.333	3/7/–4
Czechoslovakia	*	*	*	*	*	0–1–0	—	—	—	0–1–0	1	0.000	1/5/–4
Denmark	*	*	*	*	*	0–1–2	1–1–1	0–1–0	*	1–3–3	7	0.357	10/14/–4
East Germany	*	*	*	*	*	0–2–0	—	—	—	0–2–0	2	0.000	2/3/–1
Ecuador	*	*	*	*	0–2–3	0–2–0	2–0–1	3–1–1	0–0–1	5–5–6	16	0.500	12/13/–1
Egypt	*	*	*	*	0–1–0	*	1–0–0	*	*	1–1–0	2	0.500	4/3/+1
El Salvador	*	*	*	1–0–1	2–0–1	4–1–2	7–0–1	3–0–0	3–0–2	20–1–7	28	0.839	63/16/+47
England	*	1–2–0	0–1–0	*	0–1–0	1–1–0	0–2–0	0–1–1	0–0–1	2–8–2	12	0.250	9/39/–30
Estonia	1–0–0	*	*	*	*	1–0–0	*	*	*	2–0–0	2	1.000	5/0/+5
Finland	*	*	*	*	*	1–0–0	*	*	*	1–0–0	1	1.000	2/1/+1
France	*	*	*	0–2–0	*	*	*	0–1–1	*	0–3–1	4	0.125	1/11/–10
Germany	*	*	*	*	*	2–3–0	0–3–0	2–1–0	0–2–0	4–9–0	13	0.308	19/28/–9
Ghana	*	*	*	*	*	*	0–1–0	2–1–0	1–0–0	3–2–0	5	0.600	10/6/+4
Greece	*	*	*	*	*	0–0–1	*	*	*	0–0–1	1	0.500	1/1/0
Grenada	*	*	*	*	*	*	3–0–0	*	2–0–0	5–0–0	5	1.000	22/3/+19
Guadeloupe	*	*	*	*	*	*	*	1–0–0	*	1–0–0	1	1.000	1/0/+1
Guatemala	*	*	*	0–2–0	2–2–1	4–0–1	6–0–3	4–1–1	1–0–0	17–5–6	28	0.714	49/20/+29
Guyana	*	*	*	*	*	*	*	1–0–0	*	1–0–0	1	1.000	4/0/+4
Haiti	*	2–0–0	1–4–0	0–2–3	1–0–0	*	1–0–2	1–0–0	4–0–0	10–6–5	21	0.595	34/20/+14
Honduras	*	*	1–0–1	*	*	1–1–2	9–1–0	5–2–2	3–0–0	19–4–5	28	0.768	54/24/+30
Hungary	*	*	*	1–0–0	*	0–1–1	*	*	*	1–1–1	3	0.500	2/2/0
Iceland	*	0–1–0	*	0–0–1	*	2–1–1	*	1–0–0	*	3–2–2	7	0.571	12/9/+3
Iran	*	*	*	*	*	0–1–0	0–0–1	*	1–0–0	1–1–1	3	0.500	3/3/0
Ireland	0–1–0	*	*	0–1–0	*	2–1–1	0–1–1	0–2–0	*	2–6–2	10	0.300	14/22/–8
Israel	1–0–0	*	0–1–1	0–2–0	*	1–0–0	*	*	*	2–3–1	6	0.417	9/14/–5
Italy	0–1–0	*	*	*	0–0–1	0–1–1	0–2–1	1–1–0	*	1–5–3	9	0.278	5/25/–20
Jamaica	*	*	*	*	1–0–1	4–0–3	4–0–4	7–3–0	6–0–2	22–3–10	35	0.771	61/24/+37
Japan	*	*	*	*	*	0–1–0	1–0–0	*	1–1–0	2–2–0	4	0.500	6/7/–1
Korea DPR	*	*	*	*	*	0–1–0	*	*	*	0–1–0	1	0.000	1/2/–1
Korea Republic	*	0–1–0	*	*	0–3–1	1–0–1	1–1–1	1–0–0	0–1–0	3–6–3	12	0.375	8/12/–4
Kuwait	*	*	*	*	*	1–0–0	*	*	*	1–0–0	1	1.000	2/0/+2
Latvia	*	*	*	*	*	*	1–0–0	*	*	1–0–0	1	1.000	1/0/+1
Liechtenstein	*	*	*	*	*	1–0–0	*	*	*	1–0–0	1	1.000	4/1/+3
Luxembourg	*	*	*	*	1–0–0	*	*	*	*	1–0–0	1	1.000	2/0/+2
Malta	*	*	*	*	*	1–0–0	*	*	*	1–0–0	1	1.000	1/0/+1
Martinique	*	*	*	*	*	*	1–0–0	1–0–0	1–0–0	3–0–0	3	1.000	11/3/+8
Mexico	1–6–0	0–4–0	0–2–2	0–8–1	1–2–0	3–5–6	10–4–2	4–5–4	6–2–2	25–38–17	80	0.419	96/149/–53
Moldova	*	*	*	*	*	1–0–1	*	*	*	1–0–1	2	0.750	4/1/+3
Morocco	*	*	*	*	*	0–2–0	0–1–0	*	1–0–0	1–3–0	4	0.250	5/6/–1
Netherlands	*	*	*	*	*	0–1–0	0–2–0	1–1–0	0–1–0	1–5–0	6	0.167	6/13/–7
Netherlands Antilles	*	*	*	*	1–0–1	*	*	—	—	1–0–1	2	0.750	4/0/+4
New Zealand	*	*	*	*	*	1–0–0	1–0–0	0–0–1	0–0–1	2–0–2	4	0.750	6/4/+2
Nicaragua	*	*	*	*	*	*	*	1–0–0	*	1–0–0	1	1.000	3/0/+3
Nigeria	*	*	*	*	*	1–0–0	*	1–0–0	*	2–0–0	2	1.000	5/3/+2
North Macedonia	*	*	*	*	*	0–0–1	*	*	*	0–0–1	1	0.500	0/0/0
Northern Ireland	0–1–0	*	*	*	*	*	*	*	1–0–0	1–1–0	2	0.500	2/6/–4
Norway	0–1–1	*	*	*	*	1–1–0	1–0–0	*	*	2–2–1	5	0.500	8/14/–6
Oman	*	*	*	*	*	*	*	*	1–0–0	1–0–0	1	1.000	4/0/+4
Panama	*	*	*	*	*	1–0–0	5–0–2	9–1–4	3–3–1	18–4–7	29	0.741	56/20/+36
Paraguay	1–0–0	*	*	*	*	0–0–2	1–1–0	2–1–0	2–0–0	6–2–2	10	0.700	16/8/+8
Peru	*	*	*	*	1–0–0	0–2–1	1–0–0	1–0–1	1–0–0	4–2–2	8	0.625	12/8/+4
Poland	1–0–1	*	*	1–5–0	0–1–0	2–0–0	3–1–1	0–0–1	*	7–7–3	17	0.500	22/36/–14
Portugal	*	*	*	0–1–0	0–0–1	1–1–0	1–0–0	0–0–2	0–1–0	2–3–3	8	0.438	8/10/–2
Puerto Rico	*	*	*	*	*	*	*	1–0–0	*	1–0–0	1	1.000	3/1/+2
Qatar	*	*	*	*	*	*	*	*	1–0–0	1–0–0	1	1.000	1/0/+1
Romania	*	*	*	*	*	1–2–1	*	*	*	1–2–1	4	0.375	4/4/0
Russia	*	*	*	*	*	0–1–2	0–1–0	0–0–1	*	0–2–3	5	0.300	3/6/–3
Saint Kitts and Nevis	*	*	*	*	*	*	*	*	1–0–0	1–0–0	1	1.000	6/0/+6
Saint Vincent and the Grenadines	*	*	*	*	*	*	*	2–0–0	*	2–0–0	2	1.000	12/1/+11
Saudi Arabia	*	*	*	*	*	3–2–1	*	*	1–0–1	4–2–2	8	0.625	10/8/+2
Scotland	*	0–1–0	*	*	*	1–1–1	0–0–1	1–0–1	*	2–2–3	7	0.500	8/14/–6
Senegal	*	*	*	*	*	*	*	*	1–0–0	1–0–0	1	1.000	3/2/+1
Serbia	*	*	*	*	*	*	*	0–0–1	0–1–0	0–1–1	2	0.250	1/2/–1
Slovakia	*	*	*	*	*	*	0–1–0	*	*	0–1–0	1	0.000	0/1/–1
Slovenia	*	*	*	*	*	*	*	1–0–1	0–1–0	1–1–1	3	0.500	5/5/0
South Africa	*	*	*	*	*	*	2–0–0	1–0–0	*	3–0–0	3	1.000	6/0/+6
Soviet Union	*	*	*	0–2–0	*	0–1–1	—	—	—	0–3–1	4	0.125	3/10/–7
Spain	*	0–1–0	*	*	*	0–1–0	1–1–0	0–1–0	*	1–4–0	5	0.200	3/10/–7
Sweden	1–0–0	*	*	*	*	1–2–0	2–1–0	*	*	4–3–0	7	0.571	10/9/+1
Switzerland	*	*	*	0–1–0	0–0–1	0–2–2	1–0–0	0–0–1	0–2–0	1–5–4	10	0.300	7/15/–8
Thailand	*	*	*	*	1–0–0	*	*	*	*	1–0–0	1	1.000	1/0/+1
Trinidad and Tobago	*	*	*	*	4–0–1	5–1–1	7–1–1	3–1–1	4–1–0	23–4–4	31	0.807	68/15/+53
Tunisia	*	*	*	*	*	*	0–0–1	*	*	0–0–1	1	0.500	1/1/0
Turkey	*	*	*	*	*	0–0–1	0–1–0	2–0–0	0–2–0	2–3–1	6	0.417	9/10/-1
Ukraine	*	*	*	*	*	0–2–1	*	0–1–0	*	0–3–1	4	0.125	1/5/–4
Uruguay	0–1–0	*	*	*	0–0–1	1–1–1	1–0–0	0–0–1	1–1–1	3–3–4	10	0.500	12/11/+1
Uzbekistan	*	*	*	*	*	*	*	*	1–0–0	1–0–0	1	1.000	3/0/+3
Venezuela	*	*	*	*	*	0–0–1	2–0–0	1–1–1	1–0–0	4–1–2	7	0.714	12/8/+4
Wales	*	*	*	*	*	*	1–0–0	*	0–0–2	1–0–2	3	0.667	3/1/+2
Yugoslavia	*	*	*	*	*	0–1–0	—	—	—	0–1–0	1	0.000	0/1/–1
Totals	10–17–3	3–12–0	5–10–4	9–30–9	19–19–17	71–75–52	98–42–32	88–48–34	63–26–19	365–279–175	819	0.613	1249/1053/+196

== FIFA World Ranking ==
A line chart depicting the history of the U.S.'s year-end placements in the FIFA World Rankings.

Last update was on November 30, 2023

Best Ranking Worst Ranking Best Mover Worst Mover

United States' FIFA World Ranking History
Rank	Year	Best		Worst	
Rank	Year	Rank	Move	Rank	Move
12	2023	11	▲2	13	▼0
13	2022	13	▲3	16	▼2
11	2021	10	▲10	22	▼3
22	2020	22	▲1	23	▼1
22	2019	21	▲8	30	▼6
25	2018	22	▲3	25	▼2
24	2017	23	▲9	35	▼12
28	2016	22	▲6	32	▼4
32	2015	27	▲5	34	▼7
27	2014	13	▲1	28	▼6
14	2013	13	▲6	33	▼4
28	2012	27	▲5	36	▼8
34	2011	18	▲2	34	▼6
18	2010	13	▲6	25	▼7
14	2009	11	▲3	22	▼3
22	2008	20	▲7	31	▼9
19	2007	14	▲13	31	▼3
31	2006	4	▲1	31	▼11
8	2005	6	▲4	11	▼1
11	2004	7	▲3	12	▼3
11	2003	9	▲1	12	▼2
10	2002	8	▲11	24	▼2
24	2001	15	▲3	24	▼3
16	2000	16	▲2	22	▼1
22	1999	20	▲9	31	▼7
23	1998	11	▲14	23	▼8
26	1997	21	▲6	35	▼5
18	1996	14	▲9	25	▼7
19	1995	19	▲14	34	▼7
23	1994	21	▲1	24	▼2
22	1993	22	▲5	28	▼4

== United States soccer television episodes ==
- Arthur, (Muffy's Soccer Shocker), (Season 6, Episode 4A) (2001); (Francine & the Soccer Spy), (Season 21, Episode 3A) (2021); (Invasion of the Soccer Fans), (Season 21, Episode 7A) (2021)
- Alma's Way, (Soccer Friends), (Season 2, Episode 13B) (2024)
- Blue's Clues, (Soccer Practice), (Season 6, Episode 8) (2004)
- Butterbean's Café, (Team Captain Cricket!), (Season 2, Episode 3B) (2020)
- Dora the Explorer, (Dora's Super Soccer Showdown), (Season 8, Episode 14) (2014)
- Dora and Friends: Into the City!, (Soccer Chef), (Season 2, Episode 11) (2016)
- Fancy Nancy, (Nancy's Soccer Encore), (Season 2, Episode 20B) (2021)
- Floogals, (Project: Foosball), (Season 3, Episode 20) (2020)
- Lyla in the Loop, (Soccer Practice Practice), (Season 1, Episode 29A) (2025)
- Max & Ruby, (Ruby Scores!), (Season 3, Episode 8B) (2006); (Soccer Star Max), (Season 7, Episode 6B) (2018)
- PAW Patrol, (Pups Save the Soccer Game), (Season 3, Episode 3A) (2016)
- Pinkalicious & Peterrific, (Pink Mascot), (Season 2, Episode 4B) (2020)
- PJ Masks, (Soccer Ninjalinos), (Season 2, Episode 1B) (2018)
- Princess Power, (Princesses Soccer Spectacular), (Season 1, Episode 13) (2023)
- Rosie's Rules, (Rosie the Mascot), (Season 1, Episode 29B) (2023)
- Sofia the First, (A Tale of Two Teams), (Season 2, Episode 25) (2015)
- Special Agent Oso, (The Girl Who Cheered Me), (Season 1, Episode 14A) (2009); (A View to a Goal), (Season 2, Episode 28A) (2011)
- Sunny Day, (Sunny Squad), (Season 1, Episode 26) (2018)
- Team Umizoomi, (Robo Tools), (Season 4, Episode 4) (2013)
