= Christian Pulisic =

American soccer player (born 1998)

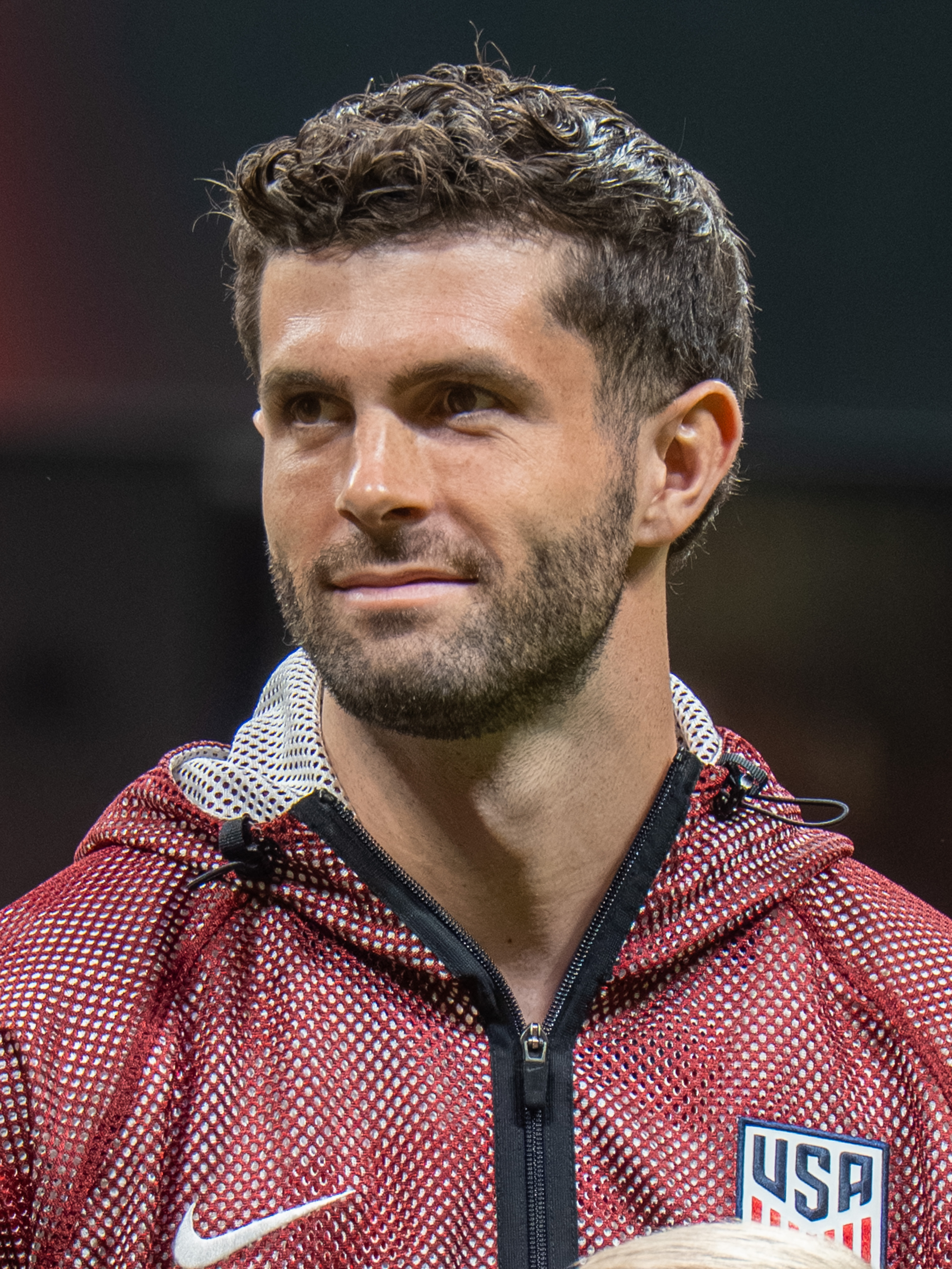
- Pulisic with the United States in 2026

Personal information
- Full name: Christian Mate Pulisic
- Date of birth: September 18, 1998 (age 28)
- Place of birth: Hershey, Pennsylvania, U.S.
- Height: 5 ft 10 in (1.78 m)
- Positions: Winger; attacking midfielder; forward

Team information
- Current team: AC Milan
- Number: 11

Youth career
- 2005–2006: Brackley Town
- 2006–2007: Michigan Rush
- 2008–2015: PA Classics
- 2015–2016: Borussia Dortmund

Senior career*
Years	Team	Apps	(Gls)
2016–2019	Borussia Dortmund	90	(13)
2019–2023	Chelsea	98	(20)
2023–	AC Milan	109	(36)

International career^{‡}
2012–2013	United States U15	10	(2)
2013–2015	United States U17	34	(20)
2016–	United States	92	(36)
Medal record
Men's soccer
Representing United States
CONCACAF Gold Cup
Runner-up	2019
CONCACAF Nations League
Winner	2021
Winner	2023
Winner	2024
- * Club domestic league appearances and goals as of 15:31, 22 November 2026 (UTC) ‡ National team caps and goals as of Novembe 17, 2026

Christian Mate Pulisic (Note: Both the anglicized pronunciation (IPA: /pəˈlɪsɪk/ pə-LISS-ik) and the original Croatian pronunciation (Pulišić, IPA: [pǔliʃitɕ], approximated as /ˈpʊlɪʃɪtʃ/ PUUL-ish-itch) have been used by commentators, and Pulisic confirmed that either form is acceptable.) (born September 18, 1998) is an American professional soccer player who plays as a winger, attacking midfielder, or forward for Serie A club AC Milan and the United States national team. Regarded as one of the best North American players of all time, he is nicknamed "Captain America" and known for his dribbling, directness, and playmaking. He is both the all-time American top goalscorer and assist provider in the European top five leagues and the UEFA Champions League.

Born and raised in Hershey, Pennsylvania, Pulisic began his professional career at Bundesliga club Borussia Dortmund, where he progressed quickly through the team's youth academy, featuring in only 15 youth games while scoring 10 and assisting 8. After being promoted to the senior team in January 2016 at age 17, he became the then-youngest player to score multiple goals in Bundesliga history. His involvement began increasing in the following 2016–17 season, where he was a mainstay in the Dortmund team that won the DFB-Pokal. His performances made him runner-up of the 2018 Kopa Trophy, presented to the world's best player under the age of 21. In January 2019, Pulisic moved to Premier League club Chelsea in a transfer worth $73 million (£57.6 million), making him the most expensive North American player of all time, and began playing for the club in the 2019–20 season. He won the 2020–21 UEFA Champions League, where he became the first American to play in a Champions League final. In the 2021–22 season, he won the 2021 UEFA Super Cup and 2021 FIFA Club World Cup. Pulisic moved to Serie A club AC Milan in June 2023 and won the 2024–25 Supercoppa Italiana.

Pulisic played for the United States at under-15 and under-17 levels, before making his senior national team debut in March 2016 at age 17. He became the youngest player ever to captain the United States national team at age 20. Pulisic was named best young player of the 2019 CONCACAF Gold Cup. He won the CONCACAF Nations League in 2021, 2023 and 2024, winning the best player award of the 2023 tournament. Individually, he is tied with Landon Donovan for the record of four U.S. Player of the Year awards and has been widely viewed as the "face" of men's American soccer.

== Early life ==
Pulisic was born in Hershey, Pennsylvania, where he spent the majority of his childhood. Pulisic's paternal grandfather, Mate Pulišić, was born on the Croatian island of Olib. His paternal grandmother Johanna DiStefano was Sicilian. Pulisic obtained Croatian citizenship later in his early adulthood. His parents, Kelley and Mark Pulisic, both played collegiate soccer at George Mason University and his father also played professional indoor soccer for the Harrisburg Heat in the 1990s and later became a coach at the youth, collegiate, and professional levels. Growing up, his soccer idol was Luís Figo.

While his mother was on a teacher exchange in England through the Fulbright Program, Pulisic lived for a year in Tackley, Oxfordshire. At age seven, he began playing for the youth team of Brackley Town. When his father was general manager of indoor club Detroit Ignition in the mid-2000s, Pulisic lived in Michigan and played for Michigan Rush. While in Michigan, he attended Workman Elementary School.

== Club career ==
After the family returned to the Hershey area, Pulisic grew up playing for local U.S. Soccer Development Academy club PA Classics and occasionally training with local professional club Harrisburg City Islanders, later known as the now-defunct Penn FC, during his teen years. In the summer of 2010, he went on a five-day trial at Chelsea's Cobham base.

=== Borussia Dortmund ===
Pulisic moved to Germany before his 16th birthday, eligible for European residency through Croatian nationality law, which allowed him to secure a Croatian passport through familial heritage. In February 2015, Borussia Dortmund signed 16-year-old Pulisic and assigned him first to their U17 squad, winning the Under 17 Bundesliga in 2014–15. He was immediately promoted in summer 2015 to the U19 squad and won the Under 19 Bundesliga for the 2015–16 season. After scoring 10 goals and assisting 8 in just 15 games with the Dortmund youth teams, Pulisic was called to join the first team over winter break.

==== 2015–16: Breakthrough season ====
In January 2016, while with the first team in the winter break, Pulisic played the second half of two friendly matches, scoring one goal and assisting another. On January 24, a day after making his debut on the first team bench, Pulisic played 90 minutes in a friendly against Union Berlin, scoring a goal and assisting another. He made his Bundesliga debut in a 2–0 win against Ingolstadt on January 30, 2016, coming on as a second-half substitute for Adrián Ramos. On February 18, Pulisic made his UEFA Europa League debut as a second-half substitute in a 2–0 victory against Porto.

Pulisic made his first Bundesliga start on February 21, against Bayer Leverkusen, before eventually being substituted for Marco Reus. He made his second Bundesliga start on April 10, against Schalke 04 in the Revierderby, playing 73 minutes before being replaced by İlkay Gündoğan. In response to Pulisic's performance against Schalke, team manager Thomas Tuchel said, "He's a teenager in his first year of professional football. His first two games in the starting eleven were in Leverkusen and here today in Schalke – not the easiest of tasks. It shows our huge appreciation that we see him as a full time player on our team. He was a valuable substitute against Werder Bremen and Liverpool. He has looked really good recently which has been proved today. It is completely normal that he could not have played with this pace and this intensity for over 90 minutes."

Pulisic scored his first Bundesliga goal for Borussia Dortmund on April 17, opening the scoring in a 3–0 home win against Hamburg. It made him the youngest non-German and fourth-youngest player to score a goal in the Bundesliga, at 17 years and 212 days old. With his goal against VfB Stuttgart on April 23, Pulisic broke another Bundesliga scoring record by becoming the youngest player to score two goals in the top-flight league. The game also marked his first yellow card in the Bundesliga, as a result of a challenge on Emiliano Insúa.

==== 2016–19: DFB-Pokal win and departure ====
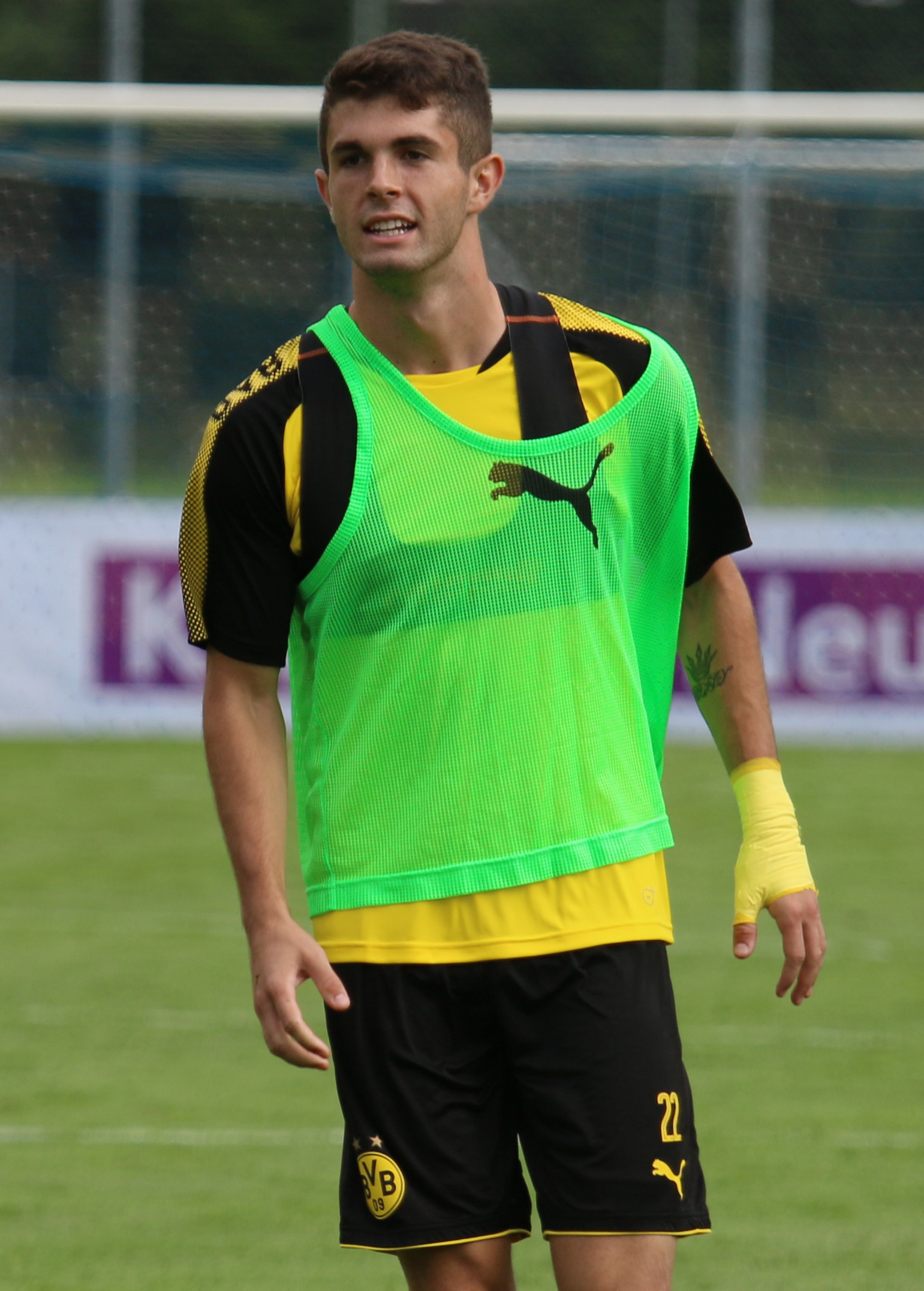
Pulisic during a training session with Borussia Dortmund

In the 2016 International Champions Cup friendly pre-season tournament, Pulisic scored in stoppage time against Manchester City to send the clubs into penalties. During his first competitive appearance in his second year with the club, Pulisic became Dortmund's youngest player ever to play in the UEFA Champions League. The following weekend he scored his first goal of the season and provided two assists in a 6–0 victory against Darmstadt 98, one day before his 18th birthday.

In a September Champions League group stage game against Real Madrid, with Dortmund trailing 2–1, Pulisic came on as a second-half substitute and helped set up André Schürrle's late goal, allowing Dortmund to earn a 2–2 draw. In a substitute appearance on October 22, Pulisic assisted one goal and scored the equalizer against Ingolstadt 04, who were last place at the beginning of the day, to salvage a draw, coming back from 3–1 down.

On January 23, 2017, Pulisic signed a new deal with Dortmund which would keep him at the club until 2020. On March 8, 2017, Pulisic scored his first UEFA Champions League goal in a 4–0 victory over Benfica in the round of 16, making him Dortmund's youngest ever scorer in the competition at the age of 18 years, 5 months, and 18 days. He was a victim of the Borussia Dortmund team bus bombing in April 2017, and was among his teammates who testified in 2019.

Pulisic assisted one of Pierre-Emerick Aubameyang's goals in the win, advancing Dortmund to the quarter-finals. On August 5, 2017, Pulisic scored the first goal in the DFL-Supercup against Bayern Munich.

Pulisic was on the final shortlist of the 2017 Golden Boy award, finishing 6th. In the following year, he was nominated final shortlist of the inaugural Kopa Trophy, finishing runner-up to Kylian Mbappé during the 2018 ceremony.

=== Chelsea ===
On January 2, 2019, Pulisic signed with Premier League club Chelsea for an estimated £58 million transfer fee. The deal also saw him stay at Dortmund on loan for the remainder of the 2018–19 season. This transfer made Pulisic the most expensive American player and Borussia Dortmund's second most expensive sale of all time, behind Ousmane Dembélé. Upon his arrival in the summer, he spoke of his desire to replicate the form shown by Eden Hazard and described the forward as a soccer idol.

==== 2019–20: Debut season and Premier League breakthrough ====
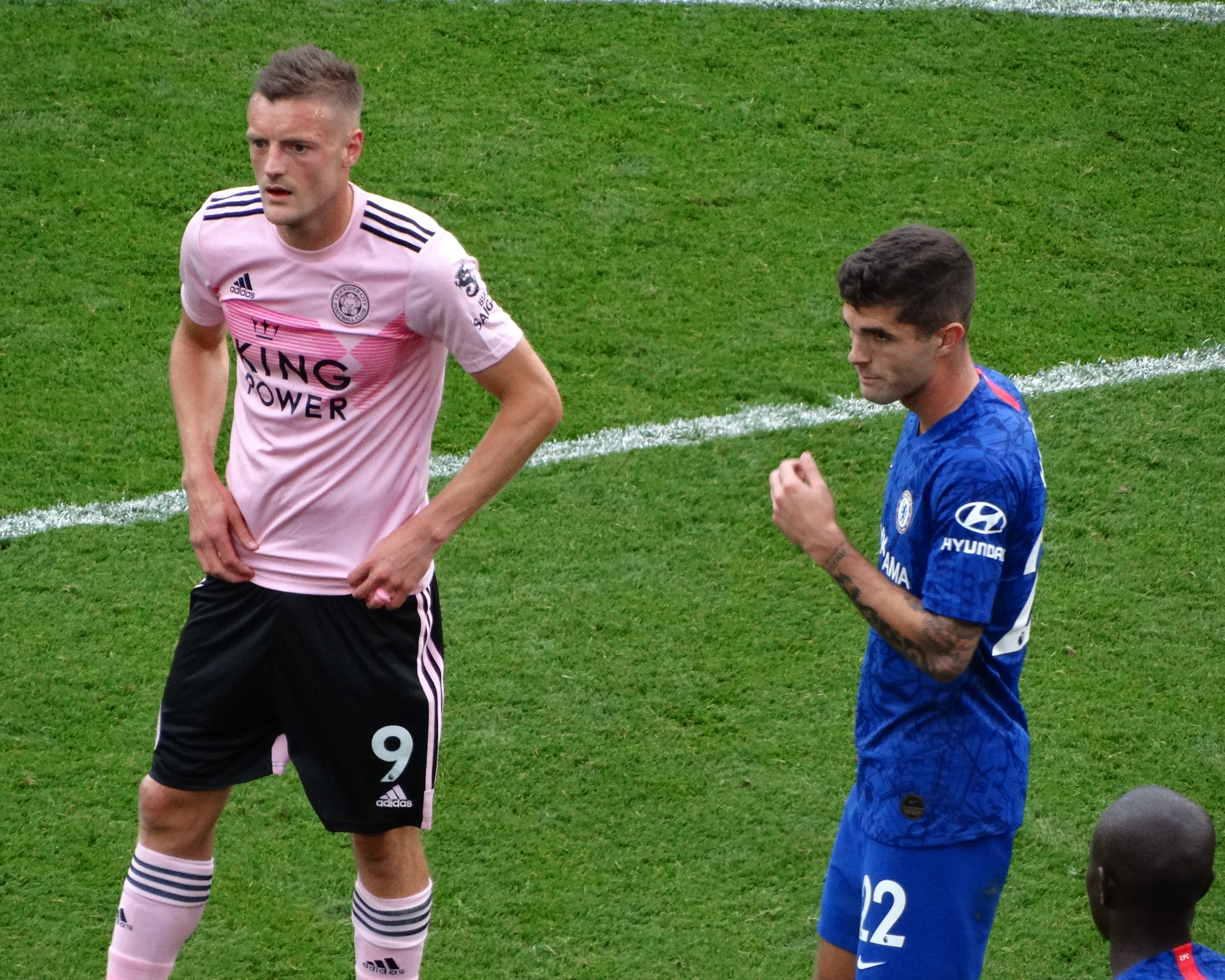
Pulisic (right, in blue) and Jamie Vardy (left, in pink) during a Premier League game against Leicester City in August 2019

On August 11, 2019, Pulisic made his Premier League debut for Chelsea in a 4–0 defeat to Manchester United. Pulisic scored his first goals for Chelsea on October 26, 2019, completing a "perfect" hat-trick in a 4–2 away win against Burnley. The hat-trick was the first of his career, and he became the second American to achieve the feat in the Premier League after Clint Dempsey for Fulham in 2012, as well as the youngest hat-trick scorer in Chelsea's history at the age of 21 years and 38 days. He also became the first Chelsea player to score a perfect hat trick since Didier Drogba in 2010. Pulisic scored in his next two league outings, a 2–1 away victory against Watford and a 2–0 home win over Crystal Palace.

On October 23, 2019, during a Champions League match against Ajax, Pulisic played as a substitute and assisted Michy Batshuayi's late goal 1–0 win. The Belgium striker thumped home fellow substitute Pulisic's low cross with just four minutes remaining at Johan Cruyff Arena to earn the Blues back to back away wins in the competition. He scored his first Champions League goal for Chelsea in a 2–2 draw away to Valencia on November 27.

When the Premier League fixtures resumed after the lockdown due to the COVID-19 pandemic, Pulisic had recovered from injury and came off the bench to score the equalizer in Chelsea's 2–1 win against Aston Villa on June 21, 2020. In the following match, Pulisic scored the first goal in Chelsea's 2–1 victory over Manchester City, a result that eliminated the second-placed City from title contention and confirmed Liverpool as Premier League champions. On July 22, Pulisic scored a goal in a 3–5 defeat to Liverpool.

On August 1, he scored the opening goal in the 2020 FA Cup Final against Arsenal after five minutes, becoming the first American player to score in the final of the competition, but was substituted early in the second half after sustaining a hamstring injury. Arsenal eventually came from behind to win the match 2–1.

In August 2020, Pulisic was named to the eight-player shortlist for the inaugural Premier League Young Player of the Season award, which was eventually awarded to Liverpool's Trent Alexander-Arnold.

Pulisic ended the season with 11 goals and 10 assists in all competitions.

==== 2020–21: Champions League victory ====
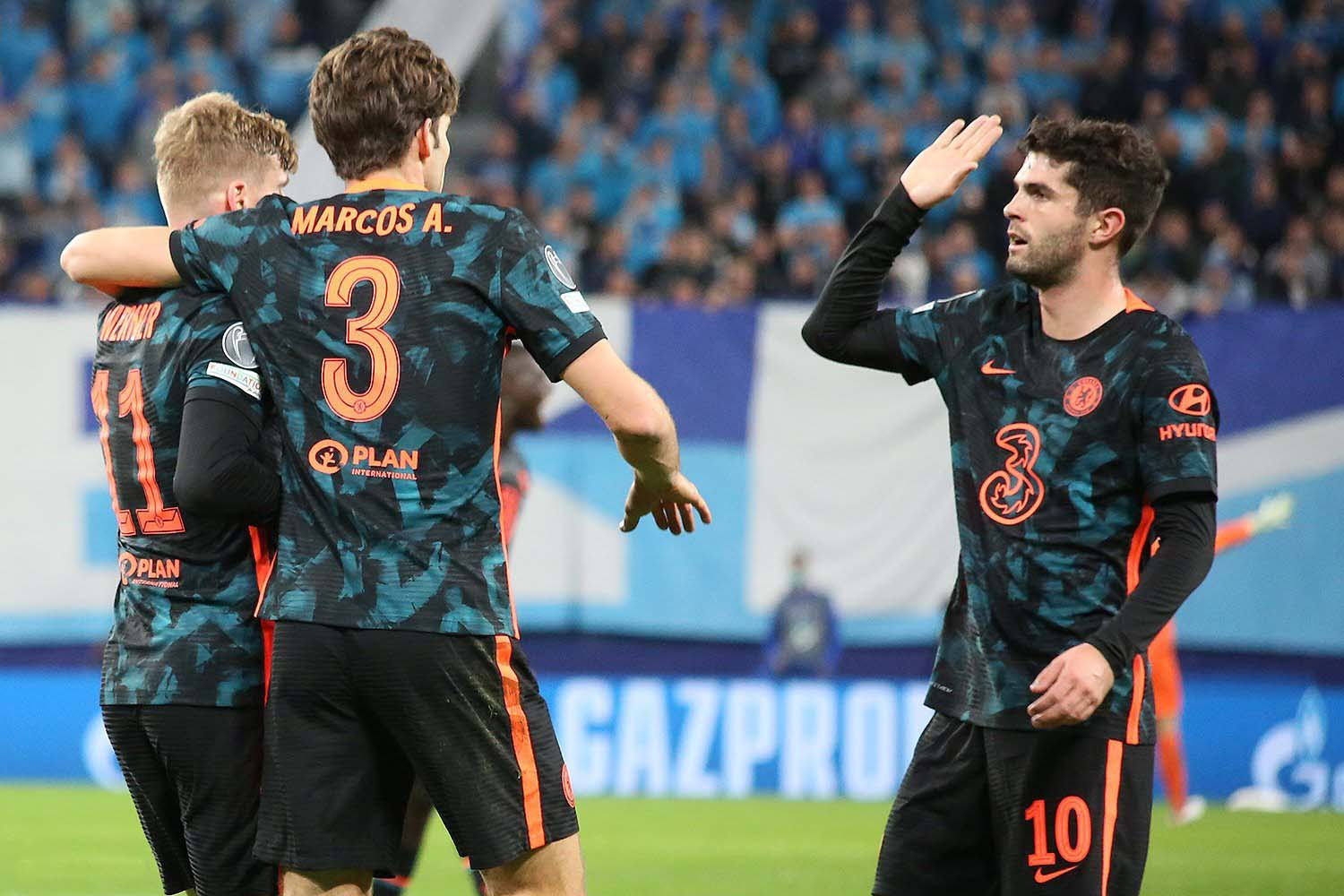
Pulisic (right) with Chelsea in December 2021

Ahead of his second season at Chelsea, Pulisic was given the number 10 shirt after Willian, who wore the number the previous season, departed in the offseason to Arsenal. He returned to training on September 9 following the hamstring injury he suffered in the FA Cup Final in August, although Lampard kept him off the squad for the season opener against Brighton after experiencing some discomfort later in the week.

Pulisic made his season debut on October 3, coming off the bench late in a 4–0 win over Crystal Palace. He made his first Premier League start of the season on October 17, a 3–3 draw against Southampton. On October 28, Pulisic came off the bench to score a 90th-minute goal in a 4–0 Champions League away win against Krasnodar. With his 93rd-minute goal for Chelsea against rivals Leeds United on December 5, Pulisic became the fastest American to reach 10 goals in the Premier League.

On April 3, 2021, Pulisic scored the opening goal in a 2–5 home league defeat to West Bromwich Albion. A week later, Pulisic scored a double against Crystal Palace in a 4–1 victory at Selhurst Park. On April 24, he tied Lionel Messi for the record of most fouls won in a UEFA Champions League match with 11 against Porto. On April 27, Pulisic scored Chelsea's only goal in a 1–1 away draw against Real Madrid at the Estadio Alfredo Di Stéfano in the first leg of the Champions League semi-final tie, becoming the youngest Chelsea player and first American to score in the Champions League semi-finals. In the return game at Stamford Bridge, Pulisic came on as a substitute and provided the assist for Mason Mount's late goal to make it 2–0 and secure passage to the final. On May 29, Pulisic won his first Champions League after Chelsea won 1–0 against Manchester City in the final at the Estádio do Dragão in Porto, becoming the first American to play in a UEFA Champions League Final and the second American to win it after Jovan Kirovski in 1997 with Borussia Dortmund.

==== 2021–23: Super Cup, Club World Cup, and departure ====
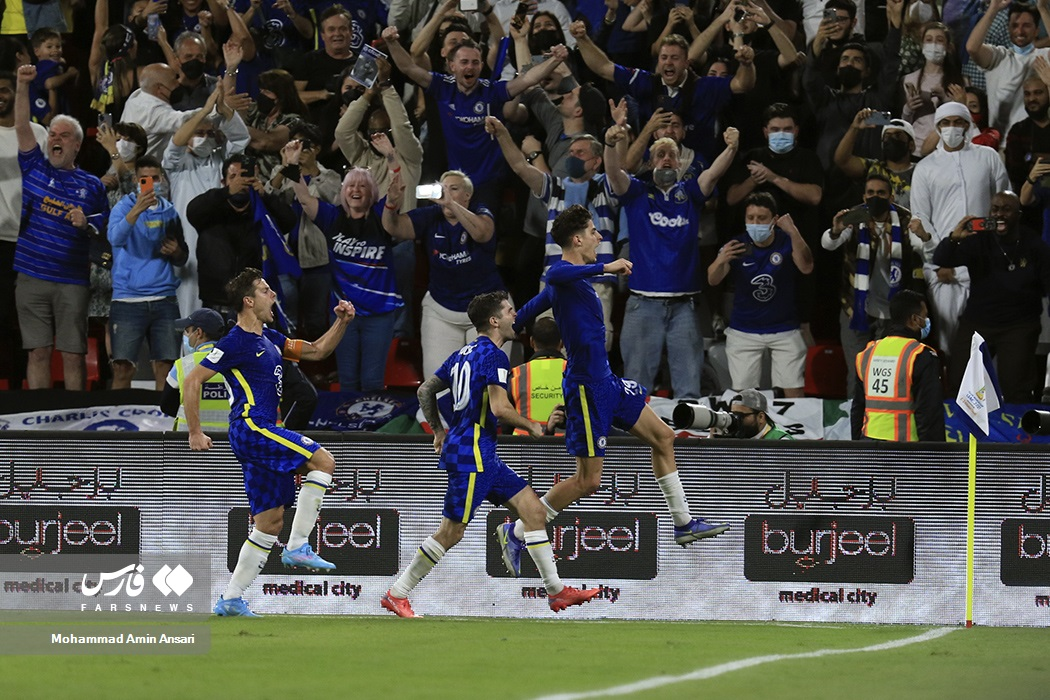
Pulisic (middle) during the 2021 FIFA Club World Cup final

On August 11, 2021, Pulisic won the 2021 UEFA Super Cup and scored in the penalty shootout. Three days later, he scored in Chelsea's opening game of the 2021–22 Premier League season, a 3–0 win over Crystal Palace. He tested positive for COVID-19 the next week, and did not play again until November because of an ankle injury. On January 2, 2022, he scored the equalizer in a 2–2 draw at home against Liverpool. He then came on early as a substitute in the 2021 FIFA Club World Cup Final, helping Chelsea to a 2–1 over Palmeiras. He started the EFL Cup Final against Liverpool on February 27 as Chelsea lost on penalties after a 0–0 draw. He scored in both legs of the club's UEFA Champions League last 16 tie against Lille, as Chelsea progressed to the quarter-finals, 4–1 on aggregate.

On October 8, 2022, Pulisic scored in his first start under new Chelsea manager Graham Potter, a 3–0 win over Wolverhampton Wanderers. After an increasing lack of starts during the 2022–23 season following Chelsea's rapid purchasing of new attackers and a shuffle of managers, it was speculated that he was going to leave the club before his contract ended in 2024. Several clubs were interested, most notably AC Milan, Lyon, Manchester United, and Newcastle United.

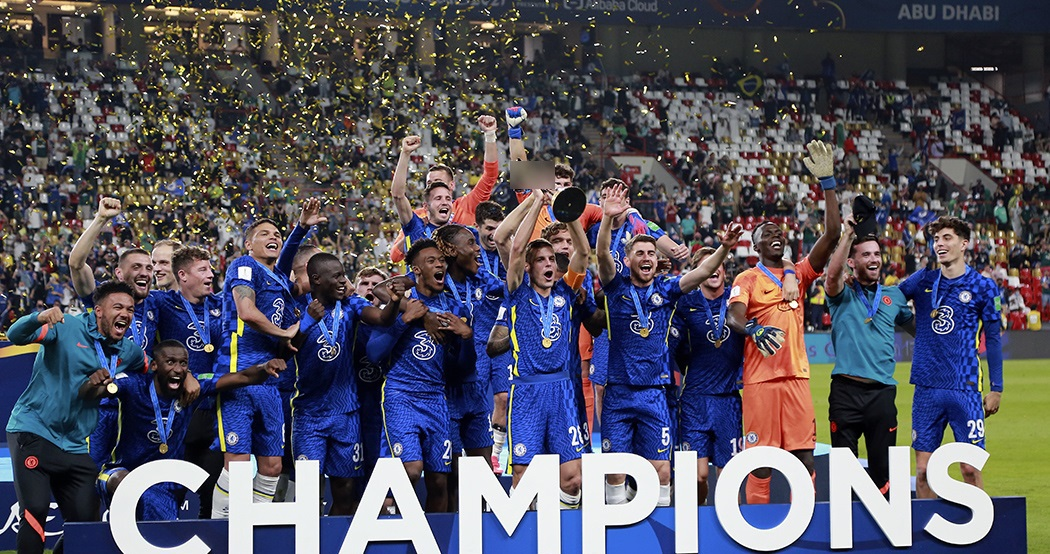
Pulisic (fifth highest from middle) celebrating after winning the 2021 FIFA Club World Cup with Chelsea

=== AC Milan ===
On July 13, 2023, Pulisic completed a transfer to Serie A club AC Milan on a four-year contract until June 30, 2027, and was given the number 11 previously worn by Zlatan Ibrahimović. The transfer was executed through a deal worth a maximum of €22 million.

==== 2023–24: Return to form in Italy ====
On August 21, Pulisic made his Serie A debut for Milan, scoring the club's second goal 2–0 win against Bologna, which in turn, made him the first American to score a goal in three of Europe's Top five leagues. In the following game on August 26, he opened Milan's 4–1 home win against Torino, leading him to be named the club's Player of the Month for August. On October 7, Pulisic scored a last-minute winner in a dramatic 1–0 win over Genoa. On December 2, he scored his fifth league goal from a long-ball kick from goalkeeper Mike Maignan in the 3–1 win over Frosinone. On December 13, he scored his first UEFA Champions League goal with Milan in the essential 2–1 win over Newcastle United in the final game of the group stage, which kept his team in European competition with the UEFA Europa League. On December 30, he scored in the 1–0 win against Sassuolo at San Siro, which he broke the record for the most Serie A goals (6) by an American player in a single season. He was named Serie A Player of the Month for December with 2 goals and 2 assists in league play, becoming the award's first-ever North American recipient.

On February 18, 2024, he came off the bench against Monza and recorded a goal and an assist to level the score 2–2, though Milan would lose 2–4. On March 2 in a dramatic 1–0 victory against Lazio, two opposing players received red card dismissals after engaging with Pulisic. Following the match, he subsequently received death threats by Lazio fans, though his performance was praised by Stefano Pioli and his teammates. On March 7 and 14, Pulisic scored in both legs against Slavia Prague in the UEFA Europa League Round of 16, tallying his first ever Europa League goals. Three days later, on March 17, he scored the second goal in a 3–1 away victory over Hellas Verona. It was the first time in his senior career that he had reached the tally of 12 goals within a single season. Moreover, the goal turned out to have some historical significance, becoming AC Milan's 5000th in the Serie A since the start of competition. On April 6, he scored his 10th Serie A goal against Lecce, which broke his career highest league seasonal goal tally. On May 11, Pulisic scored two league goals in the 5–1 victory over Cagliari, recording his first brace with Milan.

Following his debut Serie A season, he was considered the best Italian signing of 2023–24 with his personal record of 15 goals and 10 assists across all competitions. Pulisic was listed on the 3-man final shortlist of the Serie A Midfielder of the Season award with Hakan Çalhanoğlu and Teun Koopmeiners. He was named on the 2023–24 Serie A Team of the Season.

==== 2024–25: Supercoppa Italiana and AC Milan top scorer ====
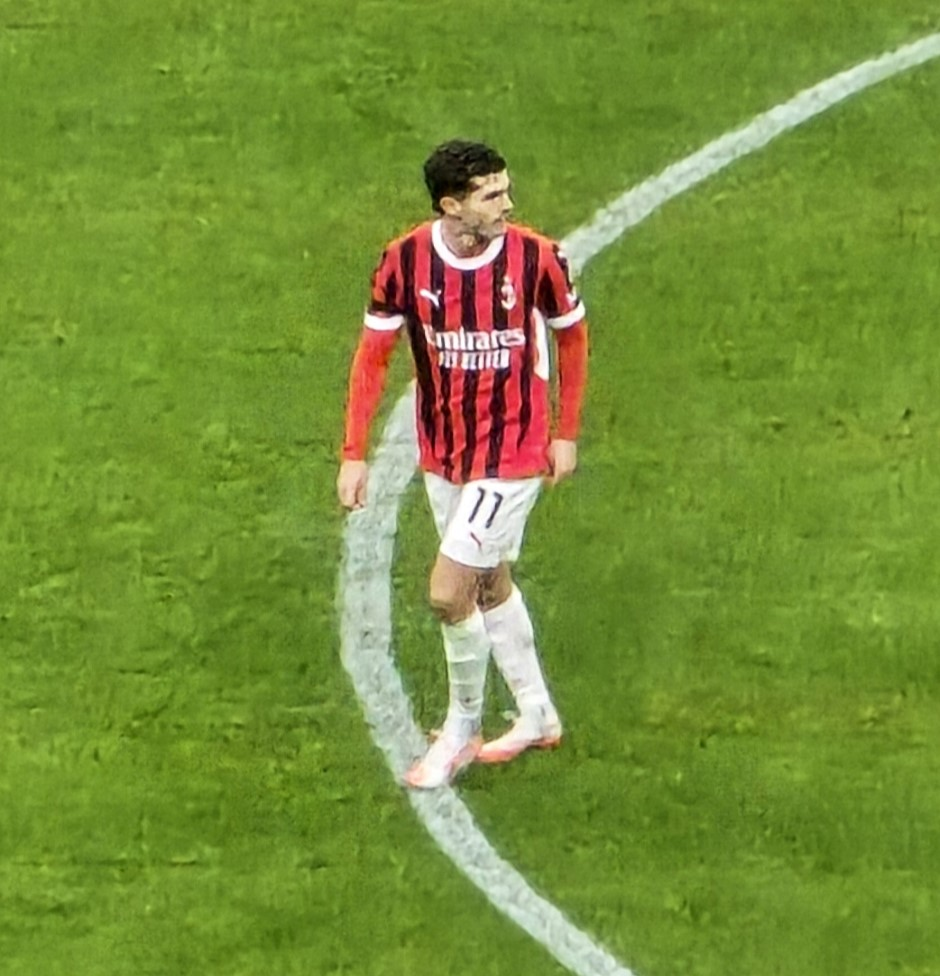
Pulisic playing for Milan in 2025

On August 24, 2024, he scored his first goal of the 2024–25 Serie A in the 1–2 defeat to Parma. On September 14 he recorded an assist and penalty goal in the 4–0 win over Venezia. In Milan's opening UEFA Champions League game on September 17, he scored the first goal in the 1–3 defeat to Liverpool. In the following game on September 22, he scored the opener in the 2–1 Derby della Madonnina win over rivals Inter by dribbling past 4 defenders in a solo effort. On September 27, he scored in his fourth-straight club game, a 3–0 win over Lecce. On October 6, in the 1–2 loss against Fiorentina he scored a volley goal. During the match, Fiorentina conceded two penalties during the game, both of which saw Pulisic controversially stripped of his penalty-taker status by teammates Théo Hernandez and Tammy Abraham, both of whom missed their penalties. After the match, Paulo Fonseca was angered by Hernandez and Abraham's actions and cemented Pulisic as the Milan penalty taker: "Of course I am upset. Christian should take penalties. It must never happen again, and I told the players." Pulisic became the first player from a top-five European league to contribute to a goal in seven consecutive league matches. On October 22, he scored a very rare Olimpico goal in the 3–1 Champions League win over Club Brugge, becoming only the fifth player in Champions League history to achieve the feat. On November 5, he assisted Malick Thiaw in the 3–1 Champions League win over Real Madrid.

On January 6, 2025, Pulisic won the 2024–25 Supercoppa Italiana against rivals Inter Milan, where he scored the equalizer and created a critical game-winning pass to Rafael Leão in an eventual 3–2 comeback victory, securing his first trophy with AC Milan. He finished as the tournament's joint-top goalscorer. Pulisic's goal made him the first American player in a top five European league since Clint Dempsey to reach double figures in consecutive seasons. After a perfect record of 12 in a row, Pulisic failed to convert a penalty kick for the first time in his professional career when his shot was blocked by Torino's goalkeeper Vanja Milinković-Savić, ending in a 1–2 defeat on February 22. On March 8 he scored a brace in the late 3–2 comeback victory over Lecce, including winning and converting the game-winning penalty. On April 27 he scored against Venezia, breaking his highest scoring season with 16 goals across all competitions.

He finished the season as AC Milan's top scorer with 17 goals along with 10 assists across all competitions. He had 9 league assists, the second highest in the Serie A behind Romelu Lukaku. Pulisic was listed on the 2024–25 Serie A Team of the Season, his second consecutive appearance.

==== 2025–26: Further performances and later decline ====
On August 17, 2025, Pulisic scored in Milan's opening 2025–26 Coppa Italia game, a 2–0 win against Bari. On September 21, he scored a brace and created an assist in the 3–0 win against Udinese, which Pulisic surpassed the record of Clint Dempsey (57) of having the most goals in the top-5 European leagues as an American with 59. On September 28, Pulisic created an assist in a solo run from his own half and later scored a goal in the 2–1 victory over Serie A leaders Napoli, claiming Milan's place at the top of the league. In September, he won his second Serie A Player of the Month award with three goals and two assists in 147 minutes of league play. Returning from a month long injury, he scored the winner in the 1–0 Derby della Madonnina over Inter, which made him tied as the Serie A goalscoring leader. On December 8 where Milan was down 1–2 against Torino, Pulisic came off the bench with an influenza fever to score a brace ultimately making a 3–2 comeback win to keep Milan as the league leaders, which commentators drew comparisons to Michael Jordan's 1997 flu game. After his 10th goal, Pulisic suffered a series of further injuries starting in late December, causing limited or inconsistent play compared to his record-breaking first half of the season. Around the same time, Milan manager Massimiliano Allegri shifted him and teammate Rafael Leão primarily into centralized striker positions away their typical winger positions, where Pulisic failed to score another goal by the end of the season.

==== 2026–27: Contract extension ====
Pulisic was left as an unused substitute the first three Milan games of the 2026–27 season. He made his first appearance since the World Cup on September 12, coming off the bench when Milan was down 0–2 against Lazio and created an assist, which ended in a 2–2 draw. On September 20, he started his first match of the season and scored the opener in a 3–0 win over Lecce, ending his eight-month-long club goal drought. On October 30, Pulisic signed a contract extension that would keep him at AC Milan through 2031. One day later, he scored the opener in the 3–1 Derby win over Inter.

== International career ==
=== 2012–2015: Youth level ===
Pulisic represented the United States at U-15 and U-17 levels. He scored two goals in 10 appearances for the under-15 team. On December 13, 2013, for the U-17 team, he played Brazil at a U17 friendly tournament in Florida where he scored a goal in the championship 4–1 win. He captained the U-17 team at the 2015 FIFA U-17 World Cup, where he scored a goal and an assist in three games. During his two years with the team, Pulisic scored a total of 20 goals in 34 games. Pulisic had been eligible to play internationally for Croatia but declined the opportunity.

=== 2016–2020: Senior debut and breaking USMNT records ===
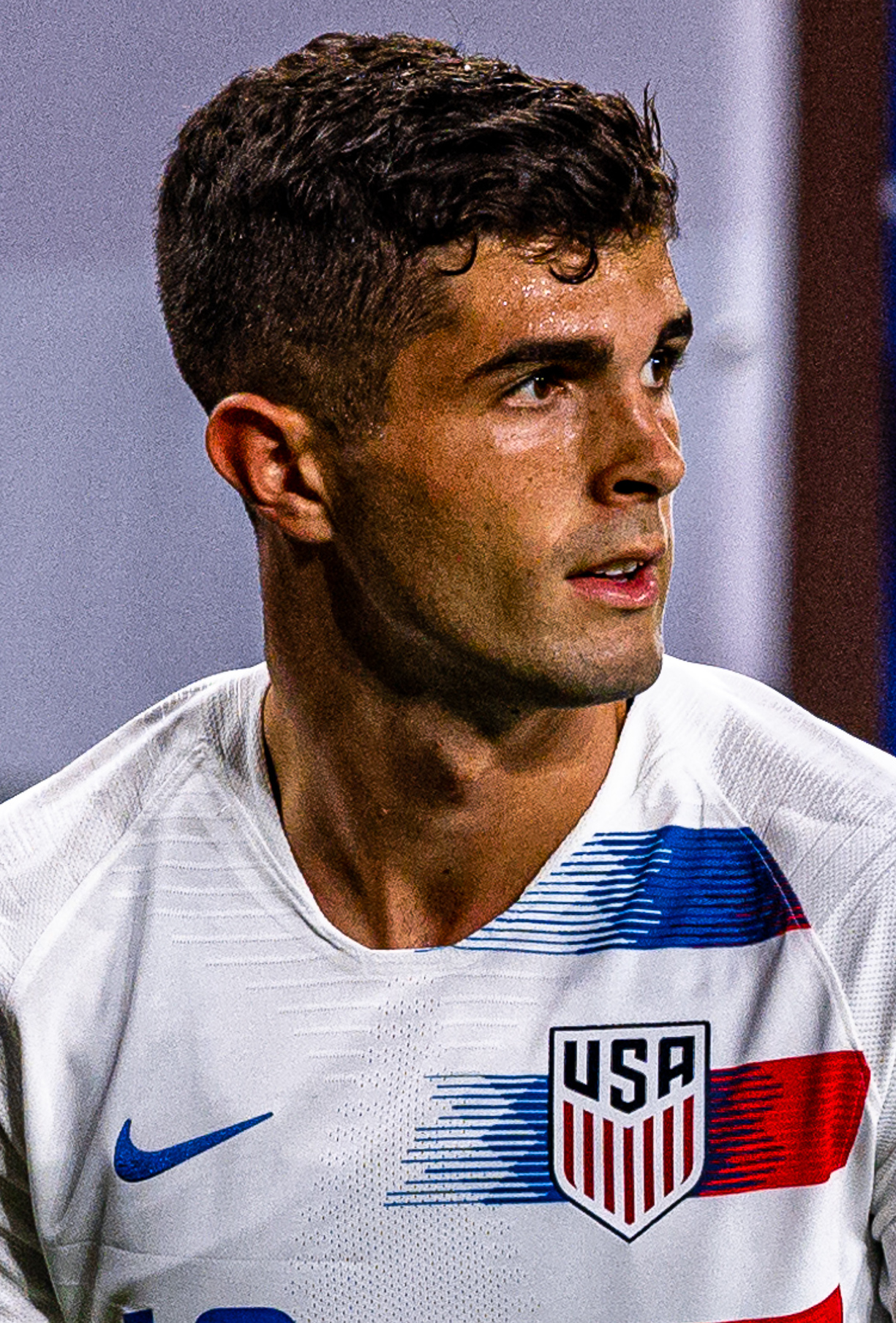
Pulisic with the United States in 2019.

On March 27, 2016, Pulisic was called up to the senior team by head coach Jürgen Klinsmann ahead of a World Cup qualifying game against Guatemala. Two days later, he made his debut in that match, a 4–0 win at the Mapfre Stadium in Columbus, Ohio, as an 81st-minute substitute for Graham Zusi. He thus became the youngest American to play in a World Cup qualifier.

Pulisic was included in the senior squad for the Copa América Centenario, which was hosted by the United States. A week later, he became the youngest player to score for the United States in the modern era, when he put home a late goal in a 4–0 friendly win against visiting side Bolivia.

On September 2, 2016, Pulisic recorded two goals and an assist in a World Cup qualifying match in a 6–0 victory over Saint Vincent and the Grenadines, thereby becoming the youngest person to score in a World Cup qualifier for the United States and the youngest player to score a brace in American history. In the following match against Trinidad and Tobago, he broke another youth record by becoming the youngest American to start a World Cup qualifying match. In the following year of qualification, on June 8, Pulisic scored both goals in a 2–0 victory over Trinidad and Tobago. In the last two matches of qualification, Pulisic scored a goal in each: a 4–0 victory over Panama and a 1–2 defeat to Trinidad and Tobago. He finished the fifth round as the top scorer with five goals. Despite his strong performances, the United States failed to qualify for the 2018 FIFA World Cup. The loss to Trinidad and Tobago is considered the most humiliating performance in American soccer history.

On November 20, 2018, Pulisic became the youngest player to captain the United States national team in a friendly defeat to Italy. Pulisic was 20 years and 63 days old. On March 26, 2019, Christian Pulisic became the youngest United States player to score 10 international goals at 20 years, 189 days old.

=== 2021–2025: Nations League three-peat and World Cup debut ===
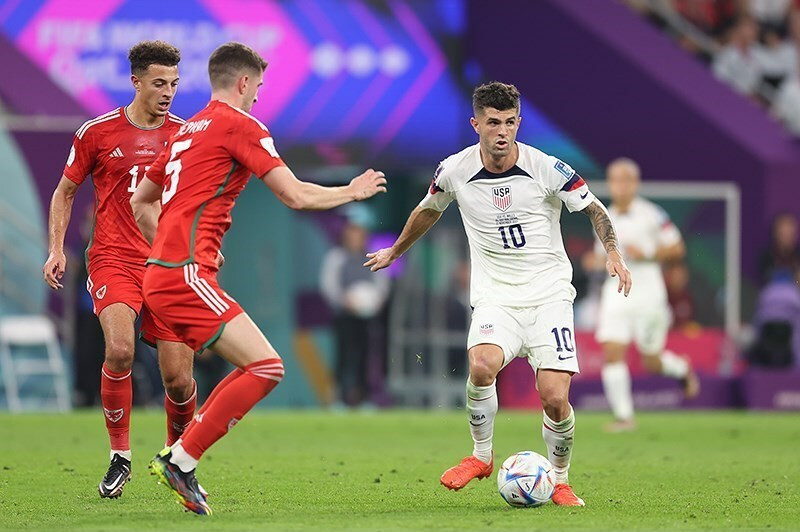
Pulisic at the 2022 FIFA World Cup against Wales.

On June 6, 2021, Pulisic captained the United States national team to a 3–2 victory in the first-ever CONCACAF Nations League final against Mexico, scoring the winning goal by converting a penalty in the 114th minute. On November 12, 2021, he scored the opener off the bench in the 2–0 win over Mexico in the 2022 FIFA World Cup qualification, where Pulisic taunted the Mexican team by lifting a shirt that said "Man in the Mirror", in response to Guillermo Ochoa's pre-game comments saying "Mexico is the mirror in which the United States wants to see itself". On March 27, 2022, Pulisic scored his first international hat-trick for the U.S. men's national team during their win over Panama in the qualifiers. His first two goals from the hat trick came from penalty kicks, and the third a nutmeg dribble passing 3 Panamanian defenders.

At his 2022 FIFA World Cup debut, Pulisic assisted Tim Weah for the team's opening group stage goal against Wales. He received his first FIFA World Cup Man of the Match award for his offensive pressure during the 0–0 draw against England. In the following game Pulisic earned his second Man of the Match award after scoring the winner in the United States' 1–0 win over Iran in their last group stage game, sending his team to the knockouts. In the Round of 16, he assisted Haji Wright's goal against the Netherlands as the United States was defeated 3–1. Pulisic, along with three other players, received the third most Man of the Match awards in the tournament with two, after Kylian Mbappé's three and Lionel Messi's four.

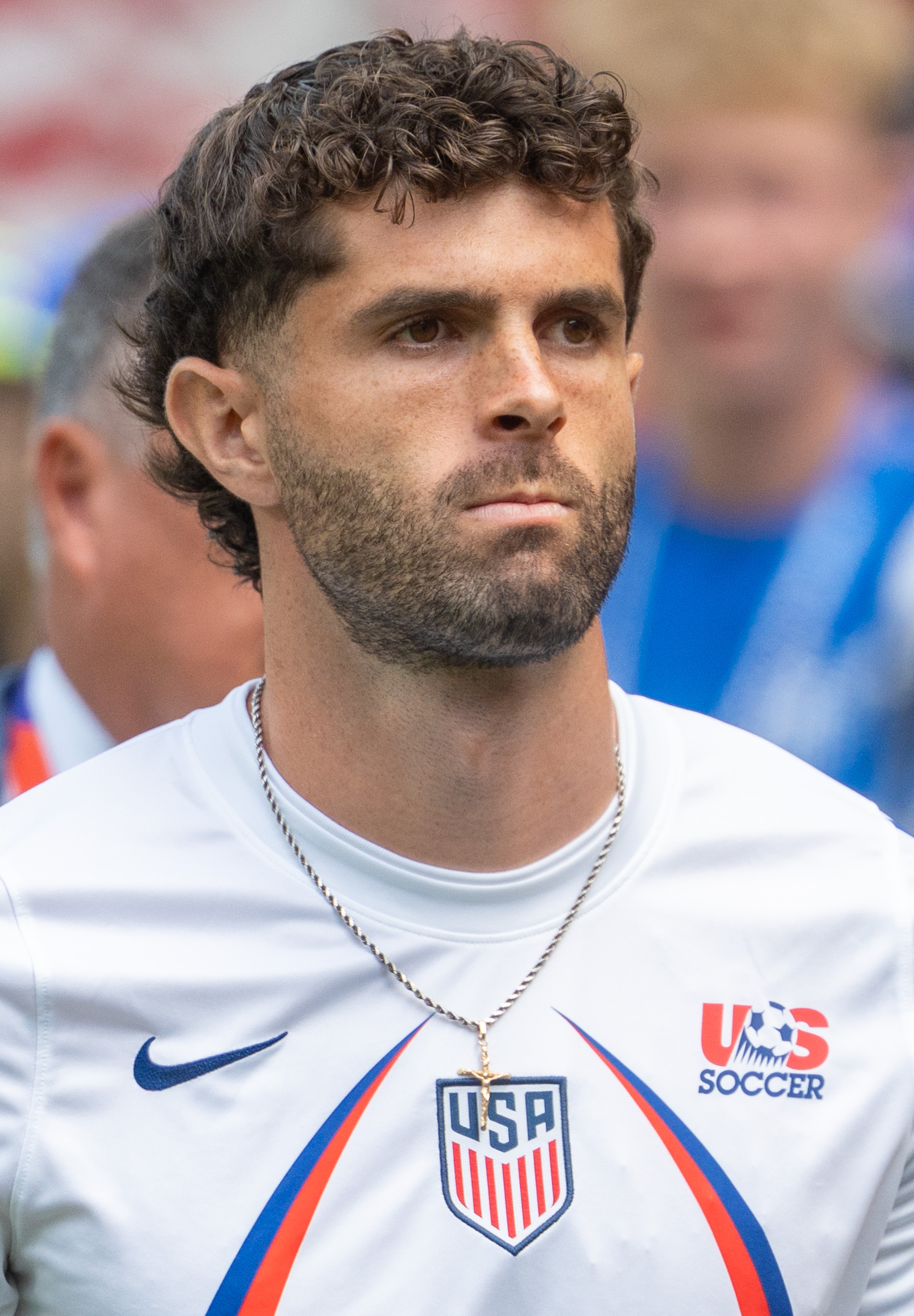
Pulisic at the 2026 FIFA World Cup

During the 2023 CONCACAF Nations League Finals, Pulisic scored a brace against Mexico in the semi-finals and was awarded Man of the Match. The United States defeated Canada 2–0 in the final, leading to him achieving his second Nations League trophy in a row. He was awarded Player of the Tournament for the 2022–23 competition. In the following year's 2024 CONCACAF Nations League Finals, Pulisic captained the U.S. in the 2–0 victory against Mexico in the final to secure his third Nations League trophy in a row and the U.S. national team's first ever title three-peat.

Competing in the 2024 Copa América, he recorded a goal and assist in the opening 2–0 group stage win over Bolivia in Group C and was awarded Man of the Match. On November 18, he became the fastest USMNT player to record 50 goal contributions after a goal against Jamaica in the CONCACAF Nations League. Pulisic declined his callup to the 2025 CONCACAF Gold Cup to rest after appearing in 50 matches during Milan's season, which caused controversy by fans and commentators.

=== 2026–present: Second World Cup ===
On May 26, 2026, Pulisic was selected in the 26-man squad for the 2026 FIFA World Cup hosted on home soil. He forced a Paraguayan own-goal after dribbling past 3 defenders and provided an assist to Folarin Balogun in the 4–1 opening group stage match victory over Paraguay, becoming the American all-time World Cup assist leader with 3, but was taken out at half-time due to an injury. Due to this, he sat out the second group stage game against Australia. He featured in the final group-stage match against Turkey and started in the round of 32 match against Bosnia and Herzegovina. Afterward, he sustained a fractured leg during the round of 16 defeat and elimination against Belgium, sidelining him for several weeks.

In the 2026–27 CONCACAF Nations League quarter-finals 6–0 first leg win over Haiti, he scored a brace and surpassed Eric Wynalda to become his nation's fourth-highest goalscorer with 35 international goals. In the second leg, he scored his first career bicycle kick goal in the 2–0 win.

== Player profile ==
=== Style of play ===
Following his promotion to the Dortmund first team, FourFourTwo writer Andy Mitten wrote that the Dortmund manager Thomas Tuchel "saw the potential – the speed, sharpness, strength, sublime fitness and mature decision-making that belied his age". Tuchel called Pulisic "the kind of guy who's very self-confident, shows his talent on the pitch, and doesn't show any nerves under pressure – which is a wonderful combination". Pulisic's Dortmund teammate Nuri Şahin said, "He's fearless [...] He has so much speed, but what I like most is his first touch. When he gets the ball, his first touch opens up a huge space for him even if there's no space." Since the 2018–19 season, Pulisic was most often deployed on the wing for Dortmund, and this continued at Chelsea and AC Milan. At Milan, with the presence of Rafael Leão on the left of the attacking third, Pulisic once again moved to the right wing. However, in absence of Leão, Pulisic sometimes was deployed as a left winger, his traditionally preferred position. He is also deployed regularly in central areas as a central attacking midfielder ("trequartista") as Milan's attacking third's playmaker. Because of his direct style of play, Pulisic is often subjected to fouls by opponents, which he holds the UEFA Champions League record of the most fouled player in a single match with 11. He typically takes corner kicks for the United States and AC Milan, which he is 1 of only 5 players in the history of the UEFA Champions League that has scored an Olimpico goal in the competition.

In July 2020, Chelsea manager Frank Lampard compared him positively to former Chelsea winger Eden Hazard, saying Pulisic "has a more direct attacking instinct. He has the talent to pass through defenders and run inside the box which is a great trait in the modern game." Lampard added, "There's still more development to come. Christian is taking responsibility to change games." Pulisic has been praised by Milan manager Stefano Pioli, as "He has quality, intensity and willingness." – "He’s scoring a lot, too, which isn’t always easy for a winger." Pulisic is routinely deployed as a central attacking midfielder ("trequartista") as the attacking third's playmaker. In November 2026, Milan manager Ruben Amorim praised Pulisic's importance to Milan, saying " he has some characteristics that, if we don't have it on the pitch, the team feels a lot that Pulisic is not there" and calling him as "the player we cannot replace."

=== Reception ===
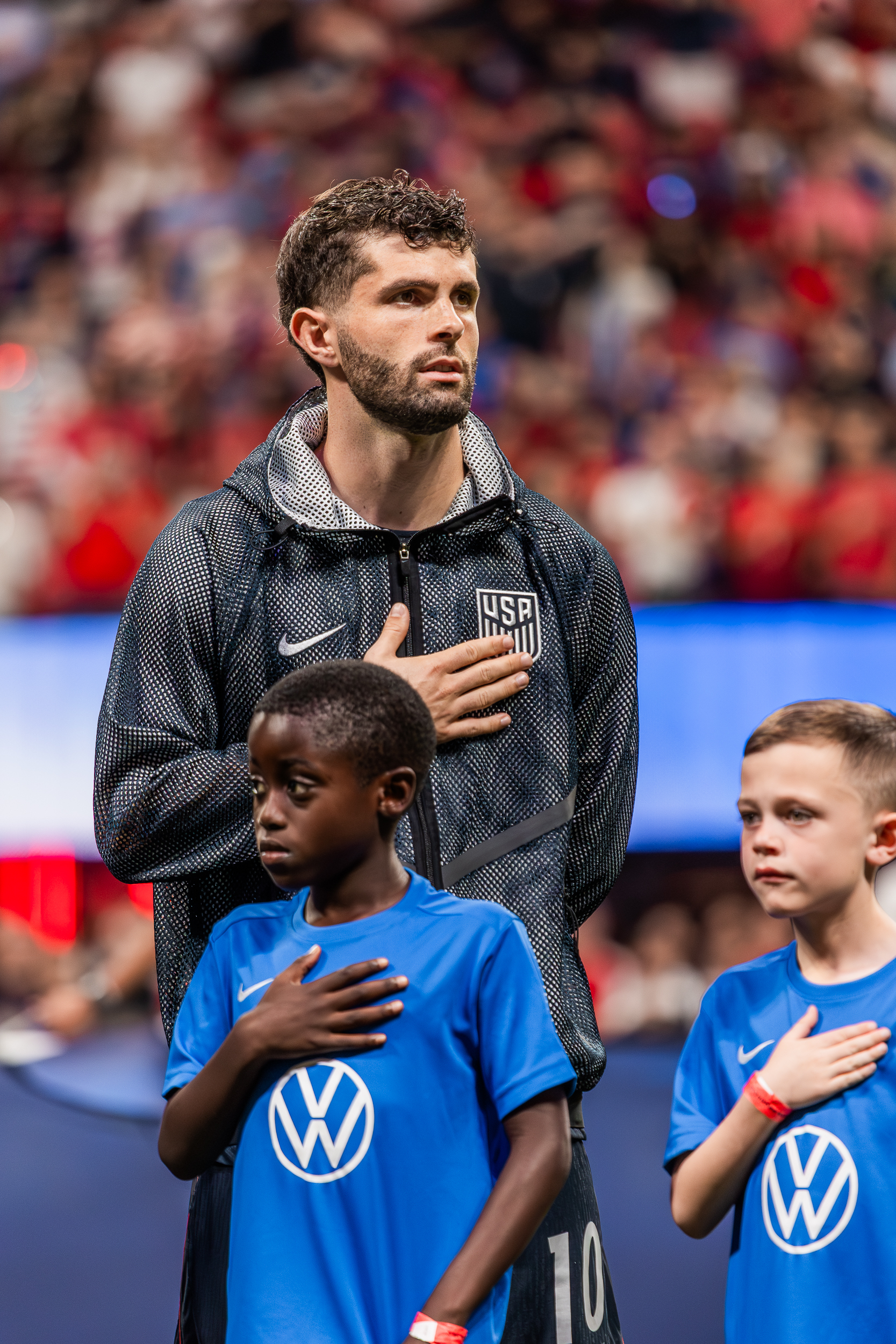
Pulisic during pre-match ceremonies against Portugal on March 31, 2026

Pulisic is widely regarded as the greatest American club player of all time and is his country's most decorated player in Europe. He is the all-time American top goalscorer and assist provider in the Serie A, the combined top five European leagues, and the UEFA Champions League. He was the first American to play in the final of and win the UEFA Champions League, UEFA Super Cup, and FIFA Club World Cup, and was the first American to score in an FA Cup final. Pulisic was the first ever American recipient of a top five European league Player of the Month award; winning the Italian Serie A Player of the Month twice.

He is regarded as one of the most talented North American (CONCACAF) players in history. In his early club seasons with Borussia Dortmund he was frequently listed as one of the world's best young players; being listed 3rd on the 2017 NXGN list of the world's 50 best wonderkids under age 19, as a finalist (6th) of the 2017 Golden Boy award; presented to the best player in Europe under age 21, and as runner-up of the 2018 Kopa Trophy to Kylian Mbappé; presented to the world's best player under age 21; which he is the only non-European to ever reach the podium of the Kopa Trophy. During his time with Chelsea he was initially praised for his talent and attacking directness by becoming the youngest Chelsea player to score a hat-trick and was a finalist for the Premier League Young Player of the Season, but was increasingly criticized for being heavily injury-prone; having missed 53 club games from a series of injuries spanning his 4 seasons. Following his move to AC Milan, Pulisic rebounded his injury record and club form, being praised as one of the best players in the Serie A, as well as one of the club's most important players.

For the national team, Pulisic since a young age has been frequently debated with U.S. national team legends Landon Donovan and Clint Dempsey over being the greatest American player of all time. At only age 25 he tied Donovan's career record of four U.S. Soccer Player of the Year awards. He won the Best Young Player award of the 2019 CONCACAF Gold Cup and the Best Player Award of the 2022–23 CONCACAF Nations League. Pulisic has been known to exceptionally perform for the U.S. national team despite historic club form struggles, most notably at Chelsea. However, he has faced criticism for resting and being emotionally and physically "soft" compared to previous U.S. internationals, most notably for skipping the 2025 CONCACAF Gold Cup.

== Personal life ==
Pulisic's status of captaining the United States national team with his high level of play has earned him the nickname "Captain America" by fans and other players. He has also been nicknamed "the LeBron James of soccer" due to a clip from the television show Pawn Stars, which has since become a meme.

Pulisic has a cousin, Will Pulisic, who previously played for MLS Next Pro team Minnesota United FC 2.

Pulisic is a practicing Catholic. He occasionally posts Bible verses on his social media accounts.

Outside of soccer, Pulisic is a fan of the New York Jets, New York Rangers, and Philadelphia 76ers. Pulisic is a fan of the Ford Mustang and imported a left-hand drive Shelby GT500 to England from the United States in 2021.

In 2021, Pulisic signed a long-term sponsorship deal with German sportswear brand Puma. On October 11, 2022, he released an autobiography titled Pulisic: My Journey So Far. The book chronicles his journey into the soccer world. In the book, he also revealed that he suffered with depression while he was injured in 2020 and during times that he did not get much playing time. In June 2024, CBS Sports announced the beginning of the filming process for the docuseries PULISIC, which would include details about Pulisic's personal life, professional career and involvement in the 2024 Copa América. It was released on March 3, 2025 on Paramount+.

From June 2024 to February 2026, he was in a relationship with American golfer Alexa Melton.

== Career statistics ==
=== Club ===
As of match played November 22, 2026

Appearances and goals by club, season and competition
Club	Season	League			National cup (Note: Includes DFB-Pokal, FA Cup, Coppa Italia)		League cup (Note: Includes EFL Cup)		Continental		Other		Total	
Club	Season	Division	Apps	Goals	Apps	Goals	Apps	Goals	Apps	Goals	Apps	Goals	Apps	Goals
Borussia Dortmund	2015–16	Bundesliga	9	2	0	0	—		3 (Note: Appearances in UEFA Europa League)	0	—		12	2
Borussia Dortmund	2016–17	Bundesliga	29	3	4	1	—		10 (Note: Appearances in UEFA Champions League)	1	—		43	5
Borussia Dortmund	2017–18	Bundesliga	32	4	1	0	—		8 (Note: Five appearances in UEFA Champions League, three appearances in UEFA Europa League)	0	1 (Note: Appearance in DFL-Supercup)	1	42	5
Borussia Dortmund	2018–19	Bundesliga	20	4	3	2	—		7	1	—		30	7
Borussia Dortmund	Total		90	13	8	3	—		28	2	1	1	127	19
Chelsea	2019–20	Premier League	25	9	2	1	2	0	4	1	1 (Note: Appearance in UEFA Super Cup)	0	34	11
Chelsea	2020–21	Premier League	27	4	6	0	0	0	10	2	—		43	6
Chelsea	2021–22	Premier League	22	6	4	0	3	0	7	2	2 (Note: One appearance in UEFA Super Cup, one appearance in FIFA Club World Cup)	0	38	8
Chelsea	2022–23	Premier League	24	1	0	0	1	0	5	0	—		30	1
Chelsea	Total		98	20	12	1	6	0	26	5	3	0	145	26
AC Milan	2023–24	Serie A	36	12	2	0	—		12 (Note: Six appearances and one goal in UEFA Champions League, six appearances and two goals in UEFA Europa League)	3	—		50	15
AC Milan	2024–25	Serie A	34	11	5	0	—		9	4	2 (Note: Appearance(s) in Supercoppa Italiana)	2	50	17
AC Milan	2025–26	Serie A	30	8	3	2	—		—		1	0	34	10
AC Milan	2026–27	Serie A	9	5	0	0	—		3	0	—		12	5
AC Milan	Total		109	36	10	2	—		24	7	3	2	146	47
Career total			297	69	30	6	6	0	78	14	7	3	418	92

=== International ===
As of match played November 17, 2026

Appearances and goals by national team and year
National team	Year	Apps	Goals
United States	2016	11	3
United States	2017	9	6
United States	2018	3	0
United States	2019	11	5
United States	2020	0	0
United States	2021	8	3
United States	2022	14	5
United States	2023	8	6
United States	2024	12	4
United States	2025	6	0
United States	2026	10	4
Total		92	36

United States score listed first, score column indicates score after each Pulisic goal.

List of international goals scored by Christian Pulisic
No.	Date	Venue	Cap	Opponent	Score	Result	Competition
1	May 28, 2016	Children's Mercy Park, Kansas City, United States	3	Bolivia	4–0	4–0	Friendly
2	September 2, 2016	Arnos Vale Stadium, Kingstown, Saint Vincent and the Grenadines	7	Saint Vincent and the Grenadines	4–0	6–0	2018 FIFA World Cup qualification
3	September 2, 2016	Arnos Vale Stadium, Kingstown, Saint Vincent and the Grenadines	7	Saint Vincent and the Grenadines	6–0	6–0	2018 FIFA World Cup qualification
4	March 24, 2017	Avaya Stadium, San Jose, United States	12	Honduras	4–0	6–0	2018 FIFA World Cup qualification
5	June 3, 2017	Rio Tinto Stadium, Sandy, United States	14	Venezuela	1–1	1–1	Friendly
6	June 8, 2017	Dick's Sporting Goods Park, Commerce City, United States	15	Trinidad and Tobago	1–0	2–0	2018 FIFA World Cup qualification
7	June 8, 2017	Dick's Sporting Goods Park, Commerce City, United States	15	Trinidad and Tobago	2–0	2–0	2018 FIFA World Cup qualification
8	October 6, 2017	Orlando City Stadium, Orlando, United States	19	Panama	1–0	4–0	2018 FIFA World Cup qualification
9	October 10, 2017	Ato Boldon Stadium, Couva, Trinidad and Tobago	20	Trinidad and Tobago	1–2	1–2	2018 FIFA World Cup qualification
10	March 26, 2019	BBVA Compass Stadium, Houston, United States	25	Chile	1–0	1–1	Friendly
11	June 22, 2019	FirstEnergy Stadium, Cleveland, United States	27	Trinidad and Tobago	4–0	6–0	2019 CONCACAF Gold Cup
12	July 3, 2019	Nissan Stadium, Nashville, United States	30	Jamaica	2–0	3–1	2019 CONCACAF Gold Cup
13	July 3, 2019	Nissan Stadium, Nashville, United States	30	Jamaica	3–1	3–1	2019 CONCACAF Gold Cup
14	October 11, 2019	Audi Field, Washington, United States	33	Cuba	7–0	7–0	2019–20 CONCACAF Nations League A
15	March 28, 2021	Windsor Park, Belfast, Northern Ireland	35	Northern Ireland	2–0	2–1	Friendly
16	June 6, 2021	Empower Field at Mile High, Denver, United States	38	Mexico	3–2	3–2 (a.e.t.)	2021 CONCACAF Nations League Finals
17	November 12, 2021	TQL Stadium, Cincinnati, United States	41	Mexico	1–0	2–0	2022 FIFA World Cup qualification
18	February 2, 2022	Allianz Field, Saint Paul, United States	45	Honduras	3–0	3–0	2022 FIFA World Cup qualification
19	March 27, 2022	Exploria Stadium, Orlando, United States	47	Panama	1–0	5–1	2022 FIFA World Cup qualification
20	March 27, 2022	Exploria Stadium, Orlando, United States	47	Panama	4–0	5–1	2022 FIFA World Cup qualification
21	March 27, 2022	Exploria Stadium, Orlando, United States	47	Panama	5–0	5–1	2022 FIFA World Cup qualification
22	November 29, 2022	Al Thumama Stadium, Doha, Qatar	55	Iran	1–0	1–0	2022 FIFA World Cup
23	March 24, 2023	Kirani James Athletic Stadium, St. George's, Grenada	57	Grenada	5–1	7–1	2022–23 CONCACAF Nations League A
24	June 15, 2023	Allegiant Stadium, Paradise, United States	59	Mexico	1–0	3–0	2023 CONCACAF Nations League Finals
25	June 15, 2023	Allegiant Stadium, Paradise, United States	59	Mexico	2–0	3–0	2023 CONCACAF Nations League Finals
26	September 9, 2023	CityPark, St. Louis, United States	61	Uzbekistan	3–0	3–0	Friendly
27	October 14, 2023	Pratt & Whitney Stadium, East Hartford, United States	63	Germany	1–0	1–3	Friendly
28	October 17, 2023	Geodis Park, Nashville, United States	64	Ghana	2–0	4–0	Friendly
29	June 12, 2024	Camping World Stadium Orlando, United States	68	Brazil	1–1	1–1	Friendly
30	June 23, 2024	AT&T Stadium, Arlington, United States	69	Bolivia	1–0	2–0	2024 Copa América
31	September 10, 2024	TQL Stadium, Cincinnati, United States	73	New Zealand	1–0	1–1	Friendly
32	November 18, 2024	CityPark, St. Louis, United States	76	Jamaica	1–0	4–2	2024–25 CONCACAF Nations League A
33	May 31, 2026	Bank of America Stadium, Charlotte, United States	85	Senegal	2–0	3–2	Friendly
34	November 14, 2026	Nu Stadium, Miami, United States	91	Haiti	3–0	6–0	2026–27 CONCACAF Nations League A
35	November 14, 2026	Nu Stadium, Miami, United States	91	Haiti	4–0	6–0	2026–27 CONCACAF Nations League A
36	November 17, 2026	TQL Stadium, Cincinnati, Ohio	92	Haiti	1–0	2–0	2026–27 CONCACAF Nations League A

== Honors ==
Borussia Dortmund U17

- Under 17 Bundesliga: 2014–15

Borussia Dortmund U19

- Under 19 Bundesliga: 2015–16

Borussia Dortmund

- DFB-Pokal: 2016–17; runner-up: 2015–16

Chelsea

- UEFA Champions League: 2020–21
- UEFA Super Cup: 2021; runner-up: 2019
- FIFA Club World Cup: 2021
- FA Cup runner-up: 2019–20, 2020–21, 2021–22
- EFL Cup runner-up: 2021–22

AC Milan

- Supercoppa Italiana: 2024–25
- Coppa Italia runner-up: 2024–25

United States

- CONCACAF Nations League: 2019–20, 2022–23, 2023–24
- CONCACAF Gold Cup runner-up: 2019

United States U17

- CONCACAF U-17 Championship third place: 2015

Individual

- UEFA Champions League Breakthrough XI: 2016
- U.S. Soccer Young Male Player of the Year: 2016
- U.S. Soccer Male Player of the Year: 2017, 2019, 2021, 2023
- Fútbol de Primera Player of the Year: 2017
- CONCACAF Best XI: 2017, 2021
- Kopa Trophy runner-up: 2018
- CONCACAF Gold Cup Best Young Player: 2019
- CONCACAF Gold Cup Best XI: 2019
- IFFHS Men's CONCACAF Team of the Year: 2020, 2021, 2022, 2023, 2024, 2025
- CONCACAF Nations League Finals Best XI: 2021, 2023, 2024
- CONCACAF Nations League Best Player: 2022–23
- EA Sports FC Serie A Team of the Season: 2023–24, 2024–25
- Serie A Player of the Month: December 2023, September 2025
- Serie A - AC Milan Gentleman Award: 2023–24
- Supercoppa Italiana Top scorer: 2024–25
- AC Milan Top Scorer: 2024–25
- Best Soccer Player ESPY Award: 2025

Records

- Most fouls won in a UEFA Champions League match: 11 from Porto, in the 2020–21 quarter-finals.

== Books ==
- Pulisic, C.; Melamud, D.; White, A. (October 11, 2022). Pulisic: My Journey So Far (1st hardcover ed.). New York: Rizzoli. ISBN 978-0847872077. OCLC 1346306524.
