= 2008–09 Nottingham Forest F.C. season =

English football club season

Nottingham Forest F.C.
2008–09 season
- Chairman: Nigel Doughty
- Manager: Colin Calderwood (until 26 December); John Pemberton (caretaker); Billy Davies (4 January onwards)
- Football League Championship: 19th
- FA Cup: Fourth round
- League Cup: Second round
- Top goalscorer: League: Robert Earnshaw (12); All: Robert Earnshaw (17)
- Highest home attendance: 29,140 (vs. Derby County, Championship, 21 February 2009)
- Lowest home attendance: 4,030 (vs. Morecambe, League Cup, 13 August 2008)
Home colours	Away colours	Third colours

The 2008–09 season was Nottingham Forest's first season back in the Football League Championship, following promotion from League One in the 2007–08 season, after spending three years in the third tier. Forest finished in 19th place, seven points above the relegation zone, having been involved in the relegation scrap all season, with Billy Davies changing fortunes around to secure Championship status for the 2009–10 season.

== Team kit ==
Supplier: Umbro
Sponsor(s): Capital One

Home	Away	Third

Source: Wikipedia Nottingham Forest Article

== Technical staff ==
Name	Role
Billy Davies	Manager
David Kelly	Assistant Manager
John Pemberton	Reserve team coach
Peter Williams	Goalkeeping coach
Julian Darby	First Team Coach
Andrew Balderston	Head Physiotherapist
Steve Devine	Physiotherapist
Andy Hunt	Physiotherapist
Ryland Morgans	Fitness coach

Name	Role
Nick Marshall	Youth Academy Director
Chris Fairclough	Youth Academy Coach
Russell Lovett	Youth Academy Coach
Tony Cook	Youth Academy Coach
Dr Frank Coffey	Medical Consultant
Terry Farndale	Kit manager
Keith Burt	Chief scout
David Pleat	Consultant to the Club

== Pre-season and friendlies ==
=== Summary ===
Forest had a busy pre-season, making six promising signings, with seven players leaving as they prepared for the 2008–09 season. The players to come in were Welsh international striker Robert Earnshaw on a three-year deal for £2.65 million, Liverpool midfielder Paul Anderson on a one-year loan, ex-Manchester United striker Andy Cole on a 12-month contract, French midfielder Guy Moussi from Angers SCO, striker Mickael Darnet from AS Cannes and Joe Garner from Carlisle United for £1.14 million. Those departing Forest were striker Grant Holt to Shrewsbury Town, Northern Ireland international midfielder Sammy Clingan to Norwich City, Ghanaian international striker Junior Agogo to Egyptian side Zamalek Sporting Club, left-back Matt Lockwood to Colchester United and midfielder Kris Commons to Derby County.

Forest had a reasonably successful pre-season, winning four, drawing one and losing two in their seven pre-season fixtures. Their warm-ups included two games against Premier League opposition in Everton and Sunderland. Forest were then asked to partake in a friendly against a second-string Republic of Ireland side on 9 October during the international break, which Forest lost 2–0.

=== Results ===
Date	Opponents	H / A	Result F–A	Scorers	Referee	Attendance	Ref.
18 July 2008	Offenbach Kickers	A	2–1	McCleary, Davies	—	5,000	
22 July 2008	Burton Albion	A	3–1	Davies 23', McGugan 47', Tyson 81'	O. Langford	2,340	
23 July 2008	AFC Telford United	A	4–1	Thornhill 7', McCleary 20', Newbold 37', Sinclair 8'	Steve Torr	1,441	
25 July 2008	Everton	H	1–1	Valente (og) 56'	K. Friend	15,488	
28 July 2008	Curzon Ashton	A	1–2	Sinclair 68'	Darren Bond	524	
30 July 2008	Sunderland	H	0–1		Andy Woolmer	12,573	
2 August 2008	Notts County	A	3–2	Earnshaw (2) 27', 74', Bennett 34'	R. Booth	7,665	
9 October 2008	Republic of Ireland XI	A	0–2		Damien Hancock	4,040	

== Coca-Cola Championship ==
=== Summary ===
Forest kicked off the 2008–09 season with a goalless home draw against Reading before suffering their first league defeat in the Championship in a 3–1 loss at Swansea City. With four strikers injured, Forest secured the loan signing of Manchester United forward Lee Martin. Martin started the scoring in the 3–2 success over Watford with a 25-yard curler; the victory was Forest's first of the Championship campaign. Robert Earnshaw netted his first league goal for the club in the victory, with Nathan Tyson, returning from injury, taking just four minutes after stepping off the bench to net the winner to put Forest 14th in the league table. Forest finished the month with a 5–1 defeat to Wolves, who went top of the Championship following the result. This marked Tyson's first start of the season after a hamstring injury. Forest picked up one point in five games during September in a 0–0 home draw against Charlton sandwiched by 2–1 loses to both Burnley and Preston, and losses at Plymouth and Sheffield Wednesday. Forest then lost their first two games in October with a 2–0 home loss to Crystal Palace and a 2–1 defeat at QPR. They won a home point against Ipswich Town but lost again four days later to Cardiff City, with both goals conceded both penalties. This run of poor form saw Forest prop up the Championship. With two away games coming up, it was being touted that manager Colin Calderwood faced the sack if they could not record a victory, but they did with a 2–1 away victory at Crystal Palace, with goals coming from midfielders Chris Cohen and Matt Thornhill. This was Forest's first win in ten games and in more than two months, and saw Forest them off the foot of the league.

November started with the East Midlands derby against Derby County at Pride Park Stadium, the first time the two teams had met in a competitive fixture in over three years. The match proved to be controversial, with Emanuel Villa scoring at both ends to make the score 1–1. Lewis McGugan was given a straight red card, then a 93rd-minute penalty for Derby was saved by former Ram Lee Camp, with manager Colin Calderwood commenting after that the save would go down in the folklore. Veteran striker Andy Cole then had his contract cancelled by "mutual consent" after the ex-Manchester United forward had fallen out with the club, as he was often being left on the bench. Forest followed up the Derby draw with another 1–1 draw at home to promotion-chasing Birmingham City and then a 2–2 draw away to Bristol City; the latter match saw Camp save another injury-time penalty and a point, seeing Forest into a four-game unbeaten run. However, they then lost 2–1 at home to Norwich City to return to the bottom of the table. A further 0–0 away draw at relegation rivals Doncaster Rovers saw mass tabloid speculation that manager Colin Calderwood was set to be replaced by Billy Davies. In the next game, at home to Barnsley, Forest won by a 36th-minute header from Joe Garner, moving off the foot of the table to 23rd. Forest drew 2–2 at Coventry City, twice coming from behind to claim a point, but their poor home form continued with a 1–0 home loss to Sheffield United and a 0–0 draw against relegation rivals Blackpool. Forest then recorded an important victory away at Southampton, with defender Wes Morgan scoring his first goal of the season and Joe Garner chipping the goalkeeper from 35 yards. This took Forest to just one point off safety, with their next game at home to bottom-of-the-table Doncaster Rovers, but Forest were 4–0 down within an hour and down to ten men for much of the second half after Julian Bennett came off injured after Forest had used all their substitutions, with a cruciate-ligament injury ruling the left-back out for the rest of the season. Forest replied with two late goals, but immediately after the game the Forest board terminated manager Colin Calderwood's contract after two and a half years in charge of the club; assistant manager David Kerslake was also dismissed. Reserve-team manager John Pemberton took caretaker charge at Norwich City, which Forest won 3–2 to rise out of the relegation zone for the first time in three months; this game saw the end of Lee Camp's loan spell.

On 1 January, Nottingham Forest appointed Billy Davies as their new manager, signing a three-and-a-half-year deal with David Kelly named as his assistant manager. Davies watched the next match, against nouveau-riche Premier League side Manchester City in the FA Cup third round, which saw Forest won 3–0 with goals from strikers Nathan Tyson, Robert Earnshaw and Joe Garner. Davies' first game in charge saw Forest go to bottom of the table Charlton Athletic and beat the strugglers 2–0, with Tyson and Earnshaw netting for the Reds. Their third victory in a row pushed Forest up to 21st and moved them closer to teams directly above them. A 2–0 home win Plymouth Argyle moved them into 20th before a big rival match in the FA Cup against Derby County at Pride Park, which ended 1–1, with a replay arranged on 4 February at the City Ground. This was followed up by a 2–1 home win against Sheffield Wednesday, in which Forest came from behind to win. The result put them 17th, four points clear of the relegation zone. February saw just one win for Forest at the end of the month against promotion chasing Reading. Forest lost their opening game of February to local rivals Derby in the FA Cup. Forest then drew 1–1 with QPR before going on a three-game losing streak to Birmingham City, Ipswich Town and Derby this time in the league. After the bitter disappointment of picking up just one victory in February, Forest were looking to get off to the best possible start, and they did against Preston in a 2–1 victory with a brace from Rob Earnshaw sending Forest three places up the table into 18th and looking a lot less likely to face the drop after another good result this time a 1–1 draw to Swansea City. However another three game losing streak to Watford, a 5–0 loss to Burnley and then a 1–0 defeat to Wolves thanks to a Michael Kightly goal saw Forest take another dramatic downturn and they slipped in the league table to the regulation place of 22nd. Forest knew that with just six games left to stay in the Championship they needed something special. After a 1–1 draw against Barnsley following a desperate equaliser from Rob Earnshaw, Forest still sat in the drop zone. Up next were Bristol City, when city went ahead through Ivan Sproule things looked bleak again at the City Ground. Rob Earnshaw again showed his fantastic ability to score vital goals after grabbing an equaliser but with twelve minutes to go Forest went 2–1 down thanks to Dele Adebola. Forest turned things round in a fantastic comeback, Joe Garner making it 2–2 and then in stoppage time on loan Dexter Blackstock grabbed the late winner to give Forest a vital three points and climb themselves out of the drop zone. A midweek match against Sheffield United followed the fantastic win against City but it was a dull affair. After Kelvin Wilson was sent off early on, Forest's best chance fell to Joe Garner who fired over the crossbar and the Red's had to settle for a 0–0 draw that put them back into the drop zone on goal difference with Barnsley. Coventry City was the next opponents Forest had to face. Forest seemed more likely too pick up a result as the match was at the City Ground following the hysterics last week against Bristol City. And the only goal from James Perch after 46 minutes gave Forest a well-deserved win sending them up to 20th and out the drop zone, however they could not be complacent yet as both Norwich City and Barnsley, the two teams behind them had games in hand. Following the draw at Coventry, Forest saw that both Barnsley and Norwich failed to pick up a result that threatened Forest's safety. The early kick off saw on 25 April saw Forest hold Blackpool to a 1–1 draw at Bloomfield Road. Barnsley played Wolves and looked to have won what was a vital game however a late equaliser for Wolves saw Forest with a chance to stay up if Norwich were to lose to Reading. And they did, two goals from Shane Long meant Forest had escaped the drop. On the final day Forest beat already relegated Southampton 3–1 and secure 19th place just behind rivals Derby County.

=== Results ===
Date	Opponents	H / A	Result F–A	Scorers	Attendance	League position	Ref.
10 August 2008	Reading	H	0–0		21,571	13th	
16 August 2008	Swansea City	A	1–3	Perch 35'	16,611	20th	
23 August 2008	Watford	H	3–2	Martin 10', Earnshaw 35', Tyson 69'	20,005	14th	
30 August 2008	Wolverhampton Wanderers	A	1–5	Stearman (og) 54'	25,301	16th	
13 September 2008	Burnley	H	1–2	Earnshaw 52'	20,504	21st	
16 September 2008	Preston North End	A	1–2	Mawene (og) 67'	13,145	23rd	
20 September 2008	Charlton Athletic	H	0–0		18,771	23rd	
27 September 2008	Plymouth Argyle	A	0–1		12,594	24th	
30 September 2008	Sheffield Wednesday	A	0–1		20,823	24th	
4 October 2008	Crystal Palace	H	0–2		22,811	24th	
18 October 2008	Queens Park Rangers	A	1–2	McGugan 84'	15,122	24th	
21 October 2008	Ipswich Town	H	1–1	McCleary 32'	19,455	24th	
25 October 2008	Cardiff City	H	0–1		19,468	24th	
28 October 2008	Crystal Palace	A	2–1	Cohen 28', Thornhill 81'	15,162	23rd	
2 November 2008	Derby County	A	1–1	Villa (og) 57'	33,010	23rd	
8 November 2008	Birmingham City	H	1–1	Perch 52'	21,415	23rd	
15 November 2008	Bristol City	A	2–2	Garner 11', Tyson 47'	17,440	23rd	
22 November 2008	Norwich City	H	1–2	Anderson 38'	18,566	24th	
25 November 2008	Doncaster Rovers	A	0–0		12,612	24th	
29 November 2008	Barnsley	H	1–0	Garner 36'	24,974	23rd	
6 December 2008	Coventry City	A	2–2	Earnshaw 27', Garner 61'	17,542	23rd	
9 December 2008	Sheffield United	H	0–1		19,541	23rd	
13 December 2008	Blackpool	H	0–0		19,103	22nd	
20 December 2008	Southampton	A	2–0	Morgan 42', Garner 75'	26,580	22nd	
26 December 2008	Doncaster Rovers	H	2–4	Hird (og) 68', Garner 85'	26,501	22nd	
28 December 2008	Norwich City	A	3–2	Thornhill 17', McGugan 30', Earnshaw 89'	25,475	21st	
10 January 2009	Charlton Athletic	A	2–0	Tyson 34', Earnshaw 36'	24,553	20th	
17 January 2009	Plymouth Argyle	H	2–0	Earnshaw 24', Anderson 21'	20,392	18th	
27 January 2009	Sheffield Wednesday	H	2–1	Tyson 34', Chambers 75'	22,618	17th	
31 January 2009	Cardiff City	A	0–2		18,779	17th	
7 February 2009	Queens Park Rangers	H	2–2	McGugan 45+1' (pen.), Cohen 67'	25,859	18th	
14 February 2009	Birmingham City	A	0–2		17,631	19th	
18 February 2009	Ipswich Town	A	1–2	Tyson 77'	19,930	20th	
21 February 2009	Derby County	H	1–3	Earnshaw 87'	29,140	20th	
28 February 2009	Reading	A	1–0	McGugan 61'	21,196	21st	
3 March 2009	Preston North End	H	2–1	Earnshaw (2) 58', 71'	17,568	18th	
7 March 2009	Swansea City	H	1–1	McGugan 76'	20,475	20th	
10 March 2009	Watford	A	1–2	Thornhill 17'	14,730	20th	
14 March 2009	Burnley	A	0–5		13,055	21st	
21 March 2009	Wolverhampton Wanderers	H	0–1		24,510	22nd	
4 April 2009	Barnsley	A	1–1	Earnshaw 68'	19,681	22nd	
11 April 2009	Bristol City	H	3–2	Earnshaw 32', Garner 83', Blackstock 89'	22,776	21st	
13 April 2009	Sheffield United	A	0–0		28,374	22nd	
18 April 2009	Coventry City	H	1–0	Perch 46',	27,856	20th	
25 April 2009	Blackpool	A	1–1	Blackstock 9'	9,279	20th	
3 May 2009	Southampton	H	3–1	Garner 73', Chambers 87', Earnshaw 90+2'	29,008	19th	

==== Results by round ====
Round	1	2	3	4	5	6	7	8	9	10	11	12	13	14	15	16	17	18	19	20	21	22	23	24	25	26	27	28	29	30	31	32	33	34	35	36	37	38	39	40	41	42	43	44	45	46
Ground	H	A	H	A	H	A	H	A	A	H	A	H	H	A	A	H	A	H	A	H	A	H	H	A	H	A	A	H	H	A	H	A	A	H	A	H	H	A	A	H	A	H	A	H	A	H
Result	D	L	W	L	L	L	D	L	L	L	L	D	L	W	D	D	D	L	D	W	D	L	D	W	L	W	W	W	W	L	D	L	L	L	W	W	D	L	L	L	D	W	D	W	D	W

A = Away; H = Home; W = Win; D = Draw; L = Loss

=== League table ===
Pos	Team	Pld	W	D	L	GF	GA	GD	Pts
17	Coventry City	46	13	15	18	47	58	−11	54
18	Derby County	46	14	12	20	55	67	−12	54
19	Nottingham Forest	46	13	14	19	50	65	−15	53
20	Barnsley	46	13	13	20	45	58	−13	52
21	Plymouth Argyle	46	13	12	21	44	57	−13	51

Updated to match(es) played on 3 May 2009. Source: The Football League
Rules for classification: 1) points; 2) goal difference; 3) number of goals scored.

== League Cup ==
=== Results ===
Date	Round	Opponents	H / A	Result F–A	Scorers	Referee	Attendance	Ref.
13 August 2008	Round One	Morecambe	H	4–0	Cohen 14', Earnshaw (2) 62', 88', Newbold 81'	C. Boyeson	4,030	
27 August 2008	Round Two	Sunderland	H	1 – 2 (a.e.t.)	Earnshaw 60'	I. Williamson	9,198	

== FA Cup ==
=== Results ===
Date	Round	Opponents	H / A	Result F–A	Scorers	Referee	Attendance	Ref.
3 January 2009	Round Three	Manchester City	A	3–0	Tyson 38', Earnshaw 42', Garner 75'	L. Probert	31,869	
23 January 2009	Round Four	Derby County	A	1–1	Earnshaw 64'	H. Webb	32,035	
4 February 2009	Round Four – Replay	Derby County	H	2–3	Cohen 2', Tyson 14' (pen.)	C. Foy	29,001	

== Squad statistics ==
=== Appearances and goals ===
The statistics for the following players are for their time during 2008–09 season playing for Nottingham Forest. Any stats from a different club during 2008–09 are not included.

- Nottingham Forest have also had four own-goals scored for them during 2008–09

No.	Pos	Nat	Player	Total		Championship		FA Cup		League Cup	
No.	Pos	Nat	Player	Apps	Goals	Apps	Goals	Apps	Goals	Apps	Goals
1	GK	(England) ENG	Paul Smith	33	0	28	0	3	0	2	0
2	DF	(England) ENG	Kelvin Wilson	39	0	35+1	0	2+1	0	0	0
3	DF	(England) ENG	Joel Lynch	24	0	20+3	0	1	0	0	0
4	DF	(England) ENG	Luke Chambers	44	2	32+7	2	3	0	2	0
5	DF	(England) ENG	Wes Morgan	46	1	42	1	2	0	2	0
6	DF	(England) ENG	Ian Breckin	28	0	17+6	0	3	0	2	0
7	MF	(England) ENG	James Perch	42	3	36+1	3	3	0	2	0
8	MF	(England) ENG	Lewis McGugan	36	5	25+8	5	3	0	0	0
9	FW	(England) ENG	Nathan Tyson	39	7	28+7	5	3	2	0+1	0
10	FW	(Wales) WAL	Robert Earnshaw	36	17	26+6	12	2	2	2	3
11	MF	(England) ENG	Paul Anderson	28	2	24+2	2	2	0	0	0
12	MF	(England) ENG	Garath McCleary	43	1	14+25	1	1+1	0	1+1	0
14	MF	(Wales) WAL	Arron Davies	16	0	3+10	0	0+2	0	1	0
15	MF	(England) ENG	Chris Cohen	46	4	41	2	3	1	2	1
16	FW	(England) ENG	Joe Garner	30	8	19+9	7	0+2	1	0	0
17	MF	(England) ENG	Lee Martin	14	1	9+4	1	0	0	1	0
17	DF	(Wales) WAL	Chris Gunter	8	0	8	0	0	0	0	0
18	MF	(England) ENG	Isaiah Osbourne	8	0	7+1	0	0	0	0	0
18	FW	(England) ENG	Andy Cole	11	0	5+5	0	0	0	1	0
19	MF	(France) FRA	Guy Moussi	19	0	14+1	0	2	0	2	0
20	MF	(Wales) WAL	Carl Fletcher	5	0	4+1	0	0	0	0	0
20	GK	(Scotland) SCO	Iain Turner	3	0	3	0	0	0	0	0
21	GK	(Northern Ireland) NIR	Lee Camp	15	0	15	0	0	0	0	0
22	MF	(England) ENG	Gary McSheffrey	4	0	4	0	0	0	0	0
23	FW	(England) ENG	Dexter Blackstock	6	2	6	2	0	0	0	0
24	MF	(Republic of Ireland) IRL	Mark Byrne	2	0	0+1	0	0+1	0	0	0
25	DF	(England) ENG	Richard Tait	0	0	0	0	0	0	0	0
26	MF	(England) ENG	Matt Thornhill	28	3	13+11	3	2	0	1+1	0
27	DF	(Republic of Ireland) IRL	Brendan Moloney	12	0	9+3	0	0	0	0	0
28	FW	(England) ENG	Emile Sinclair	4	0	0+3	0	0	0	0+1	0
29	DF	(England) ENG	Julian Bennett	13	0	10+2	0	0	0	1	0
30	GK	(England) ENG	Dale Roberts	0	0	0	0	0	0	0	0
30	GK	(England) ENG	Karl Darlow	0	0	0	0	0	0	0	0
31	GK	(England) ENG	Paddy Gamble	0	0	0	0	0	0	0	0
32	DF	(Algeria) ALG	Hamza Bencherif	0	0	0	0	0	0	0	0
33	MF	(England) ENG	Liam Hook	0	0	0	0	0	0	0	0
34	MF	(England) ENG	Reece Staples	0	0	0	0	0	0	0	0
34	FW	(England) ENG	Nialle Rodney	0	0	0	0	0	0	0	0
35	DF	(England) ENG	Tom Sharpe	0	0	0	0	0	0	0	0
36	DF	(England) ENG	Joe Heath	12	0	9+1	0	0+1	0	1	0
37	FW	(England) ENG	Adam Newbold	6	1	0+4	0	0+1	0	0+1	1
38	FW	(France) FRA	Mickael Darnet	0	0	0	0	0	0	0	0
39	DF	(Republic of Ireland) IRL	Gavin Kavanagh	0	0	0	0	0	0	0	0
39	GK	(England) ENG	Barry Richardson	0	0	0	0	0	0	0	0
40	GK	(Republic of Ireland) IRL	Shane Redmond	0	0	0	0	0	0	0	0
41	MF	(England) ENG	James Reid	1	0	0+1	0	0	0	0	0
42	FW	(England) ENG	Ryan Whitehurst	0	0	0	0	0	0	0	0
45	DF	(England) ENG	Aaron Mitchell	0	0	0	0	0	0	0	0
46	MF	(England) ENG	James Dunne	0	0	0	0	0	0	0	0

=== Top scorers ===
Last updated on 26 October 2008.

P	Player	FLC	FAC	LC	Total
1	(Wales) Robert Earnshaw	12	2	3	17
2	(England) Joe Garner	7	1		8
3	(England) Nathan Tyson	5	2		7
4	(England) Lewis McGugan	5			5
5	(England) Chris Cohen	2	1	1	4
6	(England) Matt Thornhill	3			3
7	(England) James Perch	3			3
8	(England) Dexter Blackstock	2			2
9	(England) Luke Chambers	2			2
10	(England) Paul Anderson	2			2
11	(England) Wes Morgan	1			1
12	(England) Lee Martin	1			1
13	(England) Garath McCleary	1			1
14	(England) Adam Newbold			1	1
-	Own goals	4			4

=== Disciplinary record ===
Last updated on 19 July 2009.

Includes cards collected whilst at other clubs during 2008–09

N	Pos.	Nat.	Name	Yellow card	Second yellow card	Red card	Notes
2	DF	(England)	Kelvin Wilson	2	0	1	
8	MF	(England)	Lewis McGugan	3	0	1	
5	DF	(England)	Wes Morgan	6	1	0	
26	MF	(England)	Matt Thornhill	2	1	0	
7	MF	(England)	James Perch	10	0	0	
16	FW	(England)	Joe Garner	8	0	0	
9	FW	(England)	Nathan Tyson	7	0	0	
4	DF	(England)	Luke Chambers	7	0	0	
15	MF	(England)	Chris Cohen	6	0	0	
27	DF	(Republic of Ireland)	Brendan Moloney	5	0	0	
6	DF	(England)	Ian Breckin	5	0	0	
12	MF	(England)	Garath McCleary	4	0	0	
23	FW	(England)	Dexter Blackstock	4	0	0	
29	DF	(England)	Julian Bennett	3	0	0	
18	FW	(England)	Andy Cole	3	0	0	
3	DF	(England)	Joel Lynch	2	0	0	
28	FW	(England)	Emile Sinclair	2	0	0	
17	MF	(England)	Lee Martin	1	0	0	
19	MF	(France)	Guy Moussi	1	0	0	
21	GK	(Northern Ireland)	Lee Camp	1	0	0	
20	MF	(Wales)	Carl Fletcher	1	0	0	
14	MF	(Wales)	Arron Davies	1	0	0	
36	DF	(England)	Joe Heath	1	0	0	
11	MF	(England)	Paul Anderson	1	0	0	
37	FW	(England)	Adam Newbold	1	0	0	
10	FW	(Wales)	Robert Earnshaw	1	0	0	
18	MF	(England)	Isaiah Osbourne	1	0	0	

Only competitive matches
(yellow card) = Number of bookings; (second yellow card) = Number of sending offs after a second yellow card; (red card) = Number of sending offs by a direct red card.

== Transfers ==
=== In ===
#	Position	Player	From	Fee	Date
10	FW	(Wales) Robert Earnshaw	(England) Derby County	£2.65 million	30 May 2008
19	MF	(France) Guy Moussi	(France) Angers SCO	Undisclosed	1 July 2008
18	FW	(England) Andy Cole	(England) Sunderland	Free	4 July 2008
16	FW	(England) Joe Garner	(England) Carlisle United	£1.14 million	25 July 2008

=== Out ===
#	Position	Player	To	Fee	Date
–	MF	(Scotland) Kris Commons	(England) Derby County	Free	2 June 2008
–	DF	(England) Matt Lockwood	(England) Colchester United	Undisclosed	3 June 2008
–	MF	(Republic of Ireland) Alan Power	(England) Hartlepool United	Free	5 June 2008
–	MF	(Northern Ireland) Sammy Clingan	(England) Norwich City	Free	17 June 2008
–	FW	(England) Grant Holt	(England) Shrewsbury Town	£170,000	24 June 2008
–	FW	(Ghana) Junior Agogo	(Egypt) El Zamalek	Undisclosed	8 July 2008
–	MF	(Germany) Felix Bastians	(Switzerland) BSC Young Boys	Free	10 July 2008
18	FW	(England) Andy Cole	Retired	Released	31 October 2008

=== Loans in ===
#	Position	From	Player	Start	End
11	MF	(England) Paul Anderson	(England) Liverpool	26 June 2008	1 June 2009
17	MF	(England) Lee Martin	(England) Manchester United	13 August 2008	31 December 2008
3	DF	(England) Joel Lynch	(England) Brighton and Hove Albion	25 September 2008	1 June 2009
20	MF	(Wales) Carl Fletcher	(England) Crystal Palace	17 October 2008	24 November 2008
21	GK	(Northern Ireland) Lee Camp	(England) Queens Park Rangers	20 October 2008	31 December 2008
–	MF	(England) James Dunne	(England) Arsenal	24 October 2008	31 December 2008
18	MF	(England) Isaiah Osbourne	(England) Aston Villa	3 March 2009	1 June 2009
22	MF	(England) Gary McSheffrey	(England) Birmingham City	5 March 2009	22 March 2009
17	DF	(Wales) Chris Gunter	(England) Tottenham Hotspur	12 March 2009	1 June 2009
20	GK	(Scotland) Iain Turner	(England) Everton	19 March 2009	1 June 2009
23	FW	(England) Dexter Blackstock	(England) Queens Park Rangers	26 March 2009	1 June 2009

=== Loans out ===
#	Position	To	Player	Start	End
31	GK	(England) Paddy Gamble	(England) Mansfield Town	8 August 2008	31 December 2008
35	DF	(England) Tom Sharpe	(England) Stalybridge Celtic	20 September 2008	1 June 2009
40	GK	(Republic of Ireland) Shane Redmond	(England) Eastwood Town	20 September 2008	1 June 2009
30	GK	(England) Dale Roberts	(England) Rushden and Diamonds	1 October 2008	1 June 2009
28	FW	(England) Emile Sinclair	(England) Mansfield Town	17 October 2008	1 June 2009
27	DF	(Republic of Ireland) Brendan Moloney	(England) Rushden and Diamonds	24 October 2008	27 November 2008
