= 2010–11 Nottingham Forest F.C. season =

English football club season

Nottingham Forest F.C.
2010–11 season
- Chairman: Nigel Doughty
- Manager: Billy Davies
- Stadium: City Ground
- Football League Championship: 6th
- Football League Championship play-offs: Semi-finals
- FA Cup: Fourth round
- League Cup: First round
- Top goalscorer: League: Lewis McGugan (13); All: Lewis McGugan (13)
- Highest home attendance: 29 490 vs. Derby County (Championship, 29 December 2010)
- Lowest home attendance: 19 411 vs. Burnley (Championship, 12 April 2011)
Home colours	Away colours	Third colours

The 2010–11 season was Nottingham Forest's third season in the Football League Championship, following promotion from League One in the 2007–08 season after spending three years in the third tier. Forest remained in this division after losing in the 2010 Football League play-offs. In addition to the Championship, Forest also entered the League Cup in the first round, where they were knocked out by Bradford City and the FA Cup in the third round, where they eventually were knocked out by West Ham United in the fourth round. In the league Forest once again made it the playoffs, losing to eventual winners Swansea City.

== Summary ==
Forest announced their first pre-season friendly very early, the beginning of April the previous season, away at local neighbours Mansfield Town.

Early May saw Forest sign their first player of the new season, with the announcement that Radosław Majewski would be signing for Forest on a three-year deal, after a successful season-long loan, for £1 million. A day later, a second friendly was announced, for the same night as the Mansfield game. Forest would send a team to Prenton Park to play Tranmere Rovers.

On 20 May 2010, Forest announced that they would play Peterborough United and Kidderminster Harriers in friendlies on the same date.

Changes to members of the Forest Academy were seen on 2 June. Shane Redmond, Jordan Fairclough, Jean Biansumba, Danny Elliott, Tim Hopkinson, Sean McCashin, Carl Sibson, Matthew Sykes, George Thomson, Max Wright and Tony Diagne were all released with none of them making first team appearances. However, 5 youth players were offered new contracts. Mark Byrne had spent a successful season on loan at Rushden and Diamonds to earn his contract, with Young Player of the Year Karlton Watson, Tom Mullen, Zannettos Mytides and Kieron Freeman also earning new contracts.

Forest announced their 5th pre-season friendly against League One Playoff runners-up, Swindon Town, to be played on 31 July 2010. It was announced on 16 June that Forest would play Champions League semifinalists Olympique Lyonnais at the City Ground, to be played 28 July. More foreign opposition was confirmed in the form of SC Olhanense to be played during Forest's pre-season stay in Portugal.

July started with the announcement that longtime player James Perch was to leave the Reds for newly promoted Newcastle United. Perch signed a 4-year deal for an undisclosed fee.

Two more players left the City Ground after Perch, but this time in loan switches. Mark Byrne made his way to Barnet and Joe Garner to Huddersfield Town both on six-month-long deals. Between these two deals, Forest won their first pre-season match 2–1 with goals coming from Robert Earnshaw and Matt Thornhill against Portuguese outfit S.C. Olhanense. Forest's first games on English soil saw them send out two teams to Mansfield and Tranmere. An arguably better side lost 2–0 to Tranmere, whilst a different eleven beat Mansfield 2–1. Three days later Forest again sent out two sides. A youthful Forest side saw them lose 3–0 to Kidderminster and a first team lost 1–0 to Peterborough, last season loanee George Boyd getting the goal for Peterborough.

Forest displayed an impressive performance against top European side Lyon, despite losing 3–1, and then went on to lose against Swindon in the final pre-season game, Kelvin Wilson on return from injury scoring an own goal. This completed Forest's programme of pre-season fixtures and was followed by Forest's first new arrival. Ryan Bertrand came to Forest on loan from Chelsea, until the turn of the year.

A day before Forest kicked off their season opener they let Julian Bennett go out on loan to fellow Championship side Crystal Palace for 6 months to help him get game time after being out with an injury for 18 months.

The fixtures were released on 17 June and saw Forest play relegated Burnley at Turf Moor. 3 days before the match Forest defender Luke Chambers put pen to paper on a new 2 deal to see him stay at the club until 2012, however The Reds went on to lose their first fixture 1–0. The following week Forest played their first home league match of the season against Leeds United. Dexter Blackstock headed in an early goal to give Forest the lead, but was followed by Leeds getting an equaliser before the break to see the match finish in a draw. Reading were Forest's next opponents. Forest played well for the whole game but managed to go down 1–0. However, after a freak error from the opposition keeper, Robert Earnshaw took full advantage to open his account for the season and to gain a point for his side. Forest's second home match saw them get a 3rd consecutive 1–1 draw against Norwich City. Dexter Blackstock fired Forest into the lead from the penalty spot, but Norwich managed to get an instant equaliser.

September began with Forest giving Millwall an early lead in a hardly fought match. However, Blackstock struck again late on to earn a point, salvaging Forest's unbeaten home record stretching from a year earlier. The next game saw McGugan get his first start of the season, which proved to pay off. Forest dominated the game and unlucky to go in at the break losing. However, McGugan scored two brilliant goals to give his side their first away win of the season and was the beginning of an excellent run of form for the player. Forest met Hull City in front of the Sky Sports cameras and played out a bore-draw 0–0. Forest's next game had nothing boring about it though. McGugan scored two more for himself as well as Radoslaw Majewski scoring one to see Forest comfortable beat promotion hopefuls Swansea City with class. A late consolation for The Swans could do nothing to stop Forest claiming an impressive 3 points. Paul McKenna then got his first goal of the season, albeit with a lot of luck, from outside the area to help Forest earn another home point against Sheffield United.

Forest started October with two away games against Yorkshire opposition. The first was against Doncaster Rovers which ended in a tight 1–1 draw, Blackstock scoring first before Adam Lockwood struck back quickly. Forest then travelled to Barnsley and despite a fantastic strike from McGugan, the Reds played poorly and lost 3–1. However they turned this around with two impressive home displays. McGugan again scored a wonder goal to see off Middlesbrough 1–0 before scoring possibly his best goal of them all against Ipswich Town. He made a free kick from 35 yards right into the top corner after David McGoldrick's first ever City Ground goal to win 2–0. However Forest's poor away form saw them end the month on a low with a 2–1 defeat to Portsmouth, despite a Paul Anderson opener.

November was a successful month for Forest. It began with a good away point at Watford, courtesy of another McGugan belter. Then Forest played Coventry City at home. It began with a Chambers own goal, but this was put right a few later with a great strike from Majewski. Chris Cohen then bagged his first goal of the season to give Forest a 2–1 win. Forest fought out a 0–0 draw with the league leaders Queens Park Rangers and then played the league leaders again but this time it was Cardiff City away. McGugan yet again scored from outside the area to give Forest a first half lead and then Blackstock got a late goal to secure the win. However the afternoon ended a sour note with Blackstock getting a bad leg injury, ruling him out for the rest of the season. This paved the way for Nialle Rodney to make his first ever Football League appearance, albeit only for a few minutes. Forest made two mid-season loan signings on 25 November, the loan signing deadline. These were in the form of Sheffield Wednesday striker Marcus Tudgay with a view to a permanent deal and Arsenal wonderkid Aaron Ramsey on loan till January. However these two new faces couldn't help Forest again ending the month badly due to their away form, losing 1–0 to local rivals Leicester City.

Due to the poor weather conditions Forest's games against Bristol City, Scunthorpe United and Middlesbrough were all postponed, meaning they only played two games throughout December. Forest overran Crystal Palace at home with a 3–0 win, with Luke Chambers, Marcus Tudgay and Garath McCleary all getting their first goals of the season. Forest signed American striker Robbie Findley on 23 December after he was released from Real Salt Lake, subject to a work permit. Then they played against their biggest rivals Derby County which saw Forest get their biggest crowd for 8 years. Luke Chambers got his second goal in as many matches with just two minutes on the clock to give Forest the lead. Despite a Derby setback, Marcus Tudgay bagged two goals against his home town club to send Forest into the break with a 3–1 lead. Robert Earnshaw got a goal against his former club followed a quick Derby goal to make the score 4–2. With a few minutes left Earnshaw made the score emphatic, making it 5–2 and extending Forest's unbeaten home record to 30 league games.

Forest started the New Year slow, going down 2–0 to Barnsley at home. However Forest were handed a lifeline when McGugan scored a penalty and then Nathan Tyson got an equaliser for the Reds in a match they deserved from. Forest got a good away victory against Ipswich Town 2 days later, winning 1–0 courtesy of an own goal. On 12 January Forest released young professionals Tom Mullen and Robbie Gibbons from the club. Forest's next home game was against Portsmouth and for the majority of the game they were losing 1–0. However, with 3 minutes left Portsmouth scored an own goal to equalise the game and then in stoppage time Tudgay grabbed a winner to give Forest all 3 points. Earnshaw then scored a late winner at Pride Park to Forest a second win of the season against rivals Derby. This was the first time Forest had done the double over Derby for 21 years. Forest then continued their winning run with 3 wins over Bristol City, Coventry City and Watford taking them into February in 2nd place.

The month continued well with a 1–1 draw away at league leaders Queens Park Rangers despite Forest's Majewski getting sent off. Forest then had their game in hand, away to lowly Scunthorpe United. However, Forest missed the chance to keep pressure on the top club by slumping to a disappointing 1–0 loss. Forest did not let this affect them thought. They beat promotion candidates Cardiff for the second time in the season with an impressive 2–1 home win to take them back up to second. Forests next home game was against bottom club Preston. The game looked to be finishing 1–1 before Chris Cohen scored what looked to be a winner deep into stoppage time. However even later in stoppage time Preston scored again to deny Forest a win. Away draws to Millwall and Middlesbrough saw them enter March in the playoffs.

Forest's 18-month home run finally ended at the hands of Hull City who beat The Reds 1–0. A further loss to Sheffield United away and a home 0–0 draw to Doncaster Rovers meant Forest had slipped far from the automatic places and were on the verge of slipping out the playoff places. This was confirmed when Forest conceded 11 goals in just 3 games all against promotion rivals, Swansea City, Leeds United and Reading, heading into April.

Forest got their first win in 10 matches against Burnley thanks to a brace from David McGoldrick. This boosted Forest's spirits and gave them belief they could still make the playoffs. This was again dealt a blow however when they lost 2–1 away to Norwich City. A week later Forest were back into the playoff places. They led three times before finally seeing off Leicester City 3–2. Forest then beat Bristol City, Scunthorpe United and Crystal Palace to secure themselves sixth place and a Playoff semifinal against Swansea City. Young goalkeeper Karl Darlow made his debut in the away game at Crystal Palace, playing 15 minutes for in the place of Lee Camp, who was brought off with a slight ankle injury.

Forest finished in sixth place in the league which meant they drew Swansea City in the playoffs semifinals, with Cardiff City playing Reading in the other semi. The first leg was played at the City Ground, where despite Swansea going down to ten men early on, it finished 0–0. The second leg saw Swansea get two goals in quick concession in the first half. Robert Earnshaw managed to get a goal back before hitting the post but in stoppage time, with Lee Camp out of his net due to a Forest corner, Swansea hit them on the break and got a third goal to finish the tie.

The draw for the first round of the League Cup was made on 16 June, with Forest playing the same team as last season, but this time it would be played at Bradford City's Coral Windows Stadium. Forest scored first in this fixture with the goal coming from young midfielder Matt Thornhill with a well placed finish. However, the home team managed to get an equaliser to take the game to extra time and then got the winner to progress to the next round, despite an encouraging performance from Forest. Also in this fixture, young players Nialle Rodney, Kieron Freeman and Robbie Gibbons all made it onto the bench for their first time in their careers, although they did not make an appearance.

Forest entered the competition in the third round due to their competing in the Football League Championship. The draw was made on 28 November 2010 at Wembley Stadium and pitted Forest against Preston North End from the same division at Deepdale. Forest had won in the league away the previous Monday and made sure this form continued into the FA Cup. Despite a first half goal from Preston, Paul Anderson and Luke Chambers made sure Forest were in the draw for the fourth round. The draw, held on 9 January, handed Forest an away trip to Premier League outfit West Ham United.

== Squad stats ==
=== Appearances and goals ===
This is a list of the First Team players from the 2010–11 season. Playoff stats are included under Championship. Last updated on 17 May 2011

No.	Pos	Nat	Player	Total		Championship		FA Cup		League Cup	
No.	Pos	Nat	Player	Apps	Goals	Apps	Goals	Apps	Goals	Apps	Goals
1	GK	(Northern Ireland) NIR	Lee Camp	51	0	48+0	0	2+0	0	1+0	0
3	DF	(England) ENG	Ryan Bertrand	19	0	19+0	0	0+0	0	0+0	0
3	DF	(England) ENG	Paul Konchesky	15	1	14+1	1	0+0	0	0+0	0
4	DF	(England) ENG	Luke Chambers	49	7	45+1	6	2+0	1	1+0	0
5	DF	(England) ENG	Wes Morgan	51	1	48+0	1	2+0	0	1+0	0
6	DF	(England) ENG	Kelvin Wilson	10	0	8+2	0	0+0	0	0+0	0
7	MF	(England) ENG	Paul Anderson	39	4	28+9	3	1+0	1	1+0	0
8	MF	(England) ENG	Lewis McGugan	45	13	36+6	13	2+0	0	1+0	0
9	FW	(Nigeria) NGR	Dele Adebola	32	3	4+25	2	1+1	1	0+1	0
10	FW	(Wales) WAL	Robert Earnshaw	38	9	27+9	9	1+1	0	0+0	0
11	FW	(England) ENG	Nathan Tyson	35	2	12+20	2	0+2	0	1+0	0
12	MF	(England) ENG	Garath McCleary	22	2	7+12	2	0+2	0	1+0	0
15	MF	(England) ENG	Chris Cohen	47	2	43+1	2	2+0	0	1+0	0
16	DF	(Wales) WAL	Chris Gunter	47	0	42+3	0	2+0	0	0+0	0
17	FW	(England) ENG	David McGoldrick	24	6	11+11	5	2+0	1	0+0	0
18	MF	(England) ENG	Paul McKenna	35	2	31+2	2	1+0	0	0+1	0
19	MF	(France) FRA	Guy Moussi	34	0	26+6	0	1+0	0	1+0	0
20	FW	(England) ENG	Marcus Tudgay	24	7	20+4	7	0+0	0	0+0	0
22	FW	(Scotland) SCO	Kris Boyd	13	6	8+4	6	0+0	0	0+1	0
23	FW	(England) ENG	Dexter Blackstock	18	5	13+4	5	0+0	0	0+1	0
24	MF	(Wales) WAL	Aaron Ramsey	5	0	2+3	0	0+0	0	0+0	0
24	FW	(United States) USA	Robbie Findley	2	0	0+2	0	0+0	0	0+0	0
26	MF	(England) ENG	Matt Thornhill	1	1	0+0	0	0+0	0	1+0	1
27	DF	(Republic of Ireland) IRL	Brendan Moloney	8	0	7+1	0	0+0	0	0+0	0
28	MF	(Poland) POL	Radosław Majewski	28	2	21+6	2	1+0	0	0+0	0
29	DF	(England) ENG	Julian Bennett	3	0	0+3	0	0+0	0	0+0	0
31	MF	(Republic of Ireland) IRL	Mark Byrne	0	0	0	0	0+0	0	0+0	0
33	DF	(England) ENG	Joel Lynch	15	0	8+4	0	2+0	0	1+0	0
38	GK	(England) ENG	Karl Darlow	1	0	0+1	0	0+0	0	0+0	0
41	DF	(Wales) WAL	Kieron Freeman	0	0	0	0	0+0	0	0+0	0
43	FW	(England) ENG	Nialle Rodney	3	0	0+3	0	0+0	0	0+0	0

=== Top scorers ===
Includes all competitive matches. The list is sorted by league goals when total goals are equal. Playoff stats are included under Championship.

Last updated on 17 May 2011

Position	Nation	Number	Name	Championship	League Cup	FA Cup	Total
1	(England)	8	Lewis McGugan	13	0	0	13
2	(Wales)	10	Robert Earnshaw	9	0	0	9
3	(England)	20	Marcus Tudgay	7	0	0	7
=	(England)	4	Luke Chambers	6	0	1	7
5	(Scotland)	22	Kris Boyd	6	0	0	6
=	(England)	17	David McGoldrick	5	0	1	6
7	(England)	23	Dexter Blackstock	5	0	0	5
8	(England)	7	Paul Anderson	3	0	1	4
9	(Nigeria)	9	Dele Adebola	2	0	1	3
10	(Poland)	28	Radosław Majewski	2	0	0	2
=	(England)	15	Chris Cohen	2	0	0	2
=	(England)	12	Garath McCleary	2	0	0	2
=	(England)	11	Nathan Tyson	2	0	0	2
=	(England)	18	Paul McKenna	2	0	0	2
15	(England)	3	Paul Konchesky	1	0	0	1
=	(England)	5	Wes Morgan	1	0	0	1
=	(England)	26	Matt Thornhill	0	1	0	1
			Own Goals	2	0	0	2
			TOTALS	70	1	4	75

=== Disciplinary record ===
Includes all competitive matches. Players with 1 card or more included only. Playoff stats are included under Championship.

Last updated on 17 May 2011

Position	Nation	Number	Name	Championship			League Cup			FA Cup			Total		
Position	Nation	Number	Name	Y	YY	R	Y	YY	R	Y	YY	R	Y	YY	R
GK	(Northern Ireland)	1	Lee Camp	1	0	0	0	0	0	0	0	0	1	0	0
DF	(England)	3	Ryan Bertrand	6	0	0	0	0	0	0	0	0	6	0	0
DF	(England)	3	Paul Konchesky	3	1	0	0	0	0	0	0	0	3	1	0
DF	(England)	4	Luke Chambers	3	0	0	0	0	0	1	0	0	4	0	0
DF	(England)	5	Wes Morgan	7	0	0	0	0	0	0	0	0	7	0	0
DF	(England)	6	Kelvin Wilson	1	0	0	0	0	0	0	0	0	1	0	0
MF	(England)	7	Paul Anderson	2	0	0	0	0	0	0	0	0	2	0	0
MF	(England)	8	Lewis McGugan	4	0	0	0	0	0	0	0	0	4	0	0
FW	(Wales)	10	Robert Earnshaw	3	1	0	0	0	0	0	0	0	3	1	0
FW	(England)	11	Nathan Tyson	2	0	0	0	0	0	0	0	0	2	0	0
MF	(England)	12	Garath McCleary	3	0	0	1	0	0	0	0	0	4	0	0
MF	(England)	15	Chris Cohen	6	0	1	0	0	0	0	0	0	6	0	1
MF	(Wales)	16	Chris Gunter	5	0	0	0	0	0	1	0	0	6	0	0
FW	(England)	17	David McGoldrick	3	0	0	0	0	0	0	0	0	3	0	0
MF	(England)	18	Paul McKenna	6	0	0	0	0	0	0	0	0	6	0	0
MF	(France)	19	Guy Moussi	3	0	0	0	0	0	1	0	0	4	0	0
FW	(England)	20	Marcus Tudgay	5	0	0	0	0	0	0	0	0	5	0	0
FW	(Scotland)	22	Kris Boyd	1	0	0	0	0	0	0	0	0	1	0	0
FW	(England)	23	Dexter Blackstock	4	0	0	0	0	0	0	0	0	4	0	0
MF	(Wales)	24	Aaron Ramsey	1	0	0	0	0	0	0	0	0	1	0	0
MF	(Poland)	28	Radosław Majewski	2	0	1	0	0	0	0	0	0	2	0	1
DF	(England)	33	Joel Lynch	2	0	0	1	0	0	1	0	0	4	0	0

== Transfers ==
=== In ===
#	Pos	Player	From	Fee	Date
28	MF	(Poland) Radosław Majewski	(Poland) Polonia Warszawa	£1,000,000	1 June 2010
24	FW	(United States) Robbie Findley	(United States) Real Salt Lake	Free	23 December 2010
20	FW	(England) Marcus Tudgay	(England) Sheffield Wednesday	Undisclosed	5 January 2011

=== Out ===
#	Pos	Player	To	Fee	Date
2	DF	(England) James Perch	(England) Newcastle United	Undisclosed	5 July 2010
42	MF	(Republic of Ireland) Robbie Gibbons	(Cyprus) Alki Larnaca	Released	12 January 2011
26	MF	(England) Matt Thornhill	(Scotland) Hibernian	Free	21 January 2011

=== Loans in ===
#	Pos	Player	From	Start	End
3	DF	(England) Ryan Bertrand	(England) Chelsea	5 August 2010	3 January 2011
20	FW	(England) Marcus Tudgay	(England) Sheffield Wednesday	25 November 2010	3 January 2011
24	MF	(Wales) Aaron Ramsey	(England) Arsenal	25 November 2010	3 January 2011
3	DF	(England) Paul Konchesky	(England) Liverpool	31 January 2011	4 May 2011
22	FW	(Scotland) Kris Boyd	(England) Middlesbrough	8 March 2011	31 May 2011

=== Loans out ===
#	Pos	Player	To	Start	End
31	MF	(Republic of Ireland) Mark Byrne	(England) Barnet	14 July 2010	3 January 2011
14	FW	(England) Joe Garner	(England) Huddersfield Town	21 July 2010	3 January 2011
29	DF	(England) Julian Bennett	(England) Crystal Palace	6 August 2010	3 January 2011
14	FW	(England) Joe Garner	(England) Scunthorpe United	31 January 2011	31 May 2011
31	MF	(Republic of Ireland) Mark Byrne	(England) Barnet	2 March 2011	31 May 2011
43	FW	(England) Nialle Rodney	(England) Burton Albion	8 March 2011	5 April 2011
21	GK	(England) Paul Smith	(England) Middlesbrough	8 March 2011	31 May 2011

=== Academy Out ===
#	Pos	Player	To	Fee	Date
	GK	(Republic of Ireland) Shane Redmond	(England) Chesterfield	Released	2 June 2010
	DF	(England) Jordan Fairclough	(England) Shepshed Dynamo	Released	2 June 2010
	FW	(Republic of Ireland) Jean Biansumba	(England) Shepshed Dynamo	Released	2 June 2010
	MF	(England) Danny Elliott	(England) Tamworth	Released	2 June 2010
	FW	(England) Tim Hopkinson	(United States) Old Dominion Monarchs	Released	2 June 2010
	DF	(Northern Ireland) Sean McCashin	(Spain) Jerez Industrial	Released	2 June 2010
	DF	(England) Carl Sibson	(England) Shepshed Dynamo	Released	2 June 2010
	DF	(England) Matthew Sykes	(England) Loughborough Dynamo	Released	2 June 2010
	MF	(England) George Thomson	(Spain) Jerez Industrial	Released	2 June 2010
	MF	(England) Max Wright	(England) Shepshed Dynamo	Released	2 June 2010
	DF	(France) Tony Diagne	(France) CM Aubervilliers	Released	2 June 2010
	FW	(Scotland) Tom Mullen	(England) Sheffield	Released	12 January 2011

== Club ==
=== Coaching staff ===
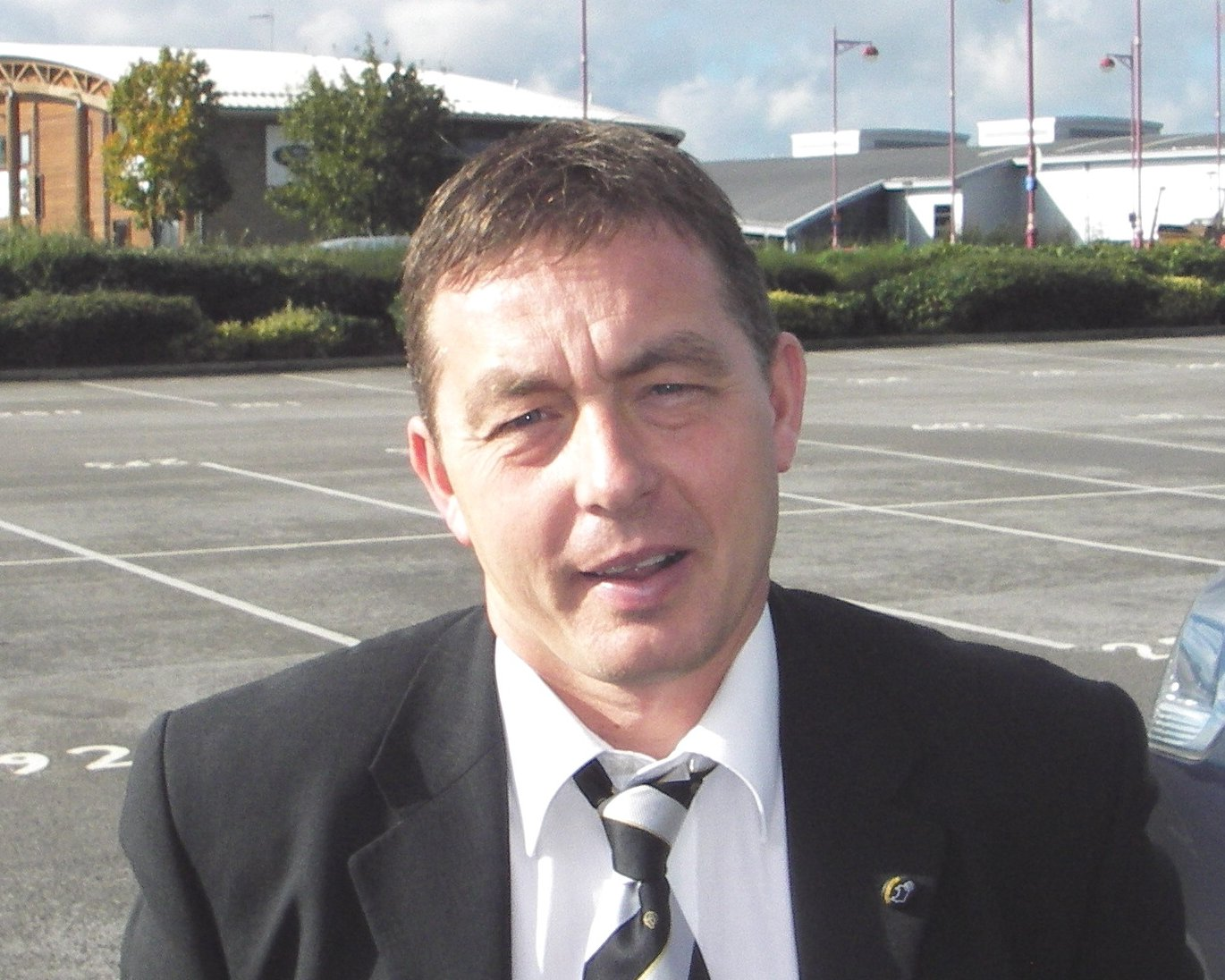
2010–11 is Billy Davies' 3rd season with Nottingham Forest.

Position	Staff
Manager	(Scotland) Billy Davies
Assistant Manager	(Republic of Ireland) David Kelly
First team Coach	(England) Julian Darby
Goalkeeping Coach	(Wales) Peter Williams
Assistant First team Coach	(England) Chris Fairclough
Head Physiotherapist	(England) Andrew Balderston
Physiotherapist	(Northern Ireland) Steve Devine
Physiotherapist	(England) Andy Hunt
Youth Academy Director	(England) Nick Marshall
Youth Academy Coach	(England) Russel Lovett
Youth Academy Coach	(England) Tony Cook
Head Academy Scout	(Greece) Tasos Makis
Medical Consultant	(Republic of Ireland) Dr Frank Coffey
Chief Scout	(England) Keith Burt
Performance Coach	(England) Darren Robinson
Kit Manager	(England) Terry Farndale
Football Analyst	(England) John Harrower
Club Consultant	(England) David Pleat

Last updated: 11 May 2011
Source: Nottingham Forest F.C.

=== Kit ===
Supplier: Umbro
Sponsor(s): Victor Chandler

Home	Away	Third	Goalkeeper Home	Goalkeeper Away	Goalkeeper Third

=== Other information ===
Role	Nat	Name
Chairman	(England)	Nigel Doughty
Chief Executive	(England)	Mark Arthur
Finance Director	(England)	John Pelling
Associate Director	(England)	Tim Farr

== Competitions ==
=== Championship ===
==== Table ====
Pos	Team	Pld	W	D	L	GF	GA	GD	Pts	Promotion, qualification or relegation
4	Cardiff City	46	23	11	12	76	54	+22	80	Qualification for Championship play-offs
5	Reading	46	20	17	9	77	51	+26	77	Qualification for Championship play-offs
6	Nottingham Forest	46	20	15	11	69	50	+19	75	Qualification for Championship play-offs
7	Leeds United	46	19	15	12	81	70	+11	72	
8	Burnley	46	18	14	14	65	61	+4	68	

Updated to match(es) played on 7 May 2011. Source: The Football League
Rules for classification: 1) points; 2) goal difference; 3) number of goals scored.

==== Results summary ====
Overall								Home						Away					
Pld	W	D	L	GF	GA	GD	Pts	W	D	L	GF	GA	GD	W	D	L	GF	GA	GD
46	20	15	11	69	50	+19	75	13	8	2	43	22	+21	7	7	9	26	28	−2

Last updated: 11 July 2011.
Source: Football League

==== Results by Round ====
Round	1	2	3	4	5	6	7	8	9	10	11	12	13	14	15	16	17	18	19	20	21	22	23	24	25	26	27	28	29	30	31	32	33	34	35	36	37	38	39	40	41	42	43	44	45	46
Ground	A	H	A	H	H	A	A	H	H	A	A	H	H	A	A	H	H	A	A	H	H	H	A	H	A	H	A	H	A	A	H	H	A	A	H	A	H	A	A	H	H	A	H	A	H	A
Result	L	D	D	D	D	W	D	W	D	D	L	W	W	L	D	W	D	W	L	W	W	D	W	W	W	W	W	W	D	L	W	D	D	D	L	L	D	L	L	L	W	L	W	W	W	W
Position	18	19	20	18	17	15	17	11	11	11	15	13	10	13	14	10	10	6	9	8	8	10	7	8	6	5	4	2	4	4	2	4	5	4	5	6	6	7	7	8	7	7	6	6	6	6

Updated to match(es) played on 11 July 2011. Source: competitive matches
A = Away; H = Home; W = Win; D = Draw; L = Loss

== Matches ==
=== Competitive ===
==== Championship ====
Last updated: 28 April 2011
Source: Nottingham Forest F.C.

7 August 2010 1	Burnley	1–0	Nottingham Forest	Burnley
15:00 BST	Iwelumo 45+1'; Mears (yellow card) 71'; Iwelumo (yellow card) 81'	(Report)	(yellow card) 87' Morgan	Stadium: Turf Moor; Attendance: 17,496; Referee: C. Webster

15 August 2010 2	Nottingham Forest	1–1	Leeds United	Nottingham
13:15 BST	Blackstock 9'; Bertrand (yellow card) 68'; Wilson (yellow card) 75'; Gunter (yellow card) 81'	(Report)	37' Sam; (yellow card) 53' Kilkenny; (yellow card) 81' Watt	Stadium: City Ground; Attendance: 24,986; Referee: T. Bates

21 August 2010 3	Reading	1–1	Nottingham Forest	Reading
15:00 BST	Pearce 15', (yellow card) 84'; Howard (yellow card) 64'	(Report)	(yellow card) 31' Blackstock; 50' Earnshaw; (yellow card) 80' Bertrand	Stadium: Madejski Stadium; Attendance: 17,324; Referee: L. Probert

28 August 2010 4	Nottingham Forest	1–1	Norwich City	Nottingham
15:00 BST	Blackstock 35' (pen.), (yellow card) 46'; Cohen (yellow card) 57'	(Report)	42' Crofts	Stadium: City Ground; Attendance: 21,890; Referee: S. Mathieson

11 September 2010 5	Nottingham Forest	1–1	Millwall	Nottingham
15:00 BST	Blackstock 80'; Morgan (yellow card) 87'	(Report)	5', (yellow card) 87' Morison; (yellow card) 74' Barron; (yellow card) 78' Dunne	Stadium: City Ground; Attendance: 23,342; Referee: N. Miller

14 September 2010 6	Preston North End	1–2	Nottingham Forest	Preston
19:45 BST	Parkin 42', (yellow card) 88'	(Report)	69', 81' McGugan	Stadium: Deepdale; Attendance: 9,779; Referee: R. Shoebridge

18 September 2010 7	Hull City	0–0	Nottingham Forest	Kingston upon Hull
17:20 BST	Dawson (yellow card) 56'; McShane (yellow card) 65'	(Report)		Stadium: KC Stadium; Attendance: 21,180; Referee: M. Halsey

25 September 2010 8	Nottingham Forest	3–1	Swansea City	Nottingham
15:00 BST	McGugan 12', 60' (pen.); Moussi (yellow card) 55'; McKenna (yellow card) 72'; Majewski 84'; Bertrand (yellow card) 90'	(Report)	(yellow card) 11' de Vries; (yellow card) 72' Allen; 90' van der Gun	Stadium: City Ground; Attendance: 19,974; Referee: N. Swarbrick

28 September 2010 9	Nottingham Forest	1–1	Sheffield United	Nottingham
19:45 BST	McGugan (yellow card) 62'; McKenna 69'	(Report)	6' Cresswell; (yellow card) 36' Montgomery; (yellow card) 44' Ertl	Stadium: City Ground; Attendance: 19,782; Referee: Mick Russell

2 October 2010 10	Doncaster Rovers	1–1	Nottingham Forest	Doncaster
15:00 BST	Lockwood 33'; Oster (yellow card) 77'	(Report)	28' Blackstock; (yellow card) 51' Cohen; (yellow card) 54' Bertrand; (yellow card) 90+3' McGoldrick	Stadium: Keepmoat Stadium; Attendance: 10,759; Referee: G. Salisbury

16 October 2010 11	Barnsley	3–1	Nottingham Forest	Barnsley
15:00 BST	Doyle 4', (yellow card) 67'; Gray 56'; Hassell (yellow card) 67'; Butterfield 87'	(Report)	(yellow card) 52' Moussi; (yellow card) 54' Blackstock; 68' McGugan	Stadium: Oakwell; Attendance: 12,844; Referee: P. Crossley

19 October 2010 12	Nottingham Forest	1–0	Middlesbrough	Nottingham
19:45 BST	McGugan 51'; Bertrand (yellow card) 71'	(Report)	(yellow card) 90' Wheater	Stadium: City Ground; Attendance: 22,115; Referee: S. Tanner

23 October 2010 13	Nottingham Forest	2–0	Ipswich Town	Nottingham
15:00 BST	McGoldrick 13'; McGugan 45'	(Report)	(yellow card) 44' Leadbitter	Stadium: City Ground; Attendance: 22,935; Referee: A. Woolmer

30 October 2010 14	Portsmouth	2–1	Nottingham Forest	Portsmouth
15:00 BST	Sonko 18'; Lawrence 62'	(Report)	27' Anderson; (yellow card) 39' Majewski	Stadium: Fratton Park; Attendance: 19,715; Referee: M. Haywood

6 November 2010 15	Watford	1–1	Nottingham Forest	Watford
15:00 GMT	Mutch 3'	(Report)	20' McGugan	Stadium: Vicarage Road; Attendance: 14,708; Referee: J. Moss

9 November 2010 16	Nottingham Forest	2–1	Coventry City	Nottingham
19:45 GMT	Majewski 41'; Chambers (yellow card) 45'; Cohen 62'	(Report)	35' (o.g.) Chambers; (yellow card) 55' Wood; (yellow card) 69' Clingan	Stadium: City Ground; Attendance: 19,501; Referee: A. Marriner

13 November 2010 17	Nottingham Forest	0–0	Queens Park Rangers	Nottingham
15:00 GMT	Blackstock (yellow card) 28'; McKenna (yellow card) 85'	(Report)	(yellow card) 65' Hulse; (yellow card) 90+3' Derry	Stadium: City Ground; Attendance: 22,859; Referee: A. D'Urso

20 November 2010 18	Cardiff City	0–2	Nottingham Forest	Cardiff
15:00 GMT		(Report)	McGugan 23'; Chambers (yellow card) 64'; McCleary (yellow card) 71'; Cohen (yellow card) 81'; Blackstock 84'	Stadium: Cardiff City Stadium; Attendance: 23,526; Referee: C. H. Webster

29 November 2010 19	Leicester City	1–0	Nottingham Forest	Leicester
19:45 GMT	King 59'	(Report)	(yellow card) 24' Cohen; (yellow card) 45+1' Bertrand	Stadium: Walkers Stadium; Attendance: 24.659; Referee: M. Oliver

18 December 2010 20	Nottingham Forest	3–0	Crystal Palace	Nottingham
15:00 GMT	Chambers 31'; Tudgay 46'; McCleary 85'	(Report)		Stadium: City Ground; Attendance: 22.359; Referee: N. Swarbrick

29 December 2010 21	Nottingham Forest	5–2	Derby County	Nottingham
19:45 BST	Chambers 2'; Tudgay 24', 45+1'; Earnshaw 53', 90+3', (yellow card) 90'	(Report)	(yellow card) 8' Leacock; 14' Moore; (yellow card) 22' Moxey; 55', (yellow card) 57' Commons	Stadium: City Ground; Attendance: 29.490; Referee: A. Bates

1 January 2011 22	Nottingham Forest	2–2	Barnsley	Nottingham
15:00 BST	Chambers (yellow card) 39'; McGugan 68' (pen.); Tyson 80'	(Report)	17' Hill; 50' Gray; (yellow card) 73' Hassell	Stadium: City Ground; Attendance: 22,179; Referee: D. Whitestone

3 January 2011 23	Ipswich Town	0–1	Nottingham Forest	Ipswich
15:00 BST	Norris (yellow card) 35'; Leadbitter (red card) 90+4'	(Report)	(yellow card) 30' Camp; 45' (o.g.) Delaney; (yellow card) 66' Ramsey	Stadium: Portman Road; Attendance: 19,455; Referee: D. Sheldrake

15 January 2011 24	Nottingham Forest	2–1	Portsmouth	Nottingham
15:00 BST	Lynch (yellow card) 54'; Sonko 87' (o.g.); Tudgay 90+4'	(Report)	26' Kanu; (yellow card) 42' Mullins; (yellow card) 77' Mokoena; (yellow card) 90+3' Kilbey	Stadium: City Ground; Attendance: 21,856; Referee: K. Friend

22 January 2011 25	Derby County	0–1	Nottingham Forest	Derby
13:00 BST	Leacock (yellow card) 23'; Savage (yellow card) 35'; Bueno (yellow card) 61'; Moxey (yellow card) 68' (red card) 90+5'	(Report)	(yellow card) 45+4' Anderson; 79', (yellow card) 80' Earnshaw; (yellow card) 90' Lynch	Stadium: Pride Park Stadium; Attendance: 33,010; Referee: G. Salisbury

25 January 2011 26	Nottingham Forest	1–0	Bristol City	Nottingham
19:45 BST	Chambers 47'	(Report)		Stadium: City Ground; Attendance: 19,694; Referee: D. McDermid

1 February 2011 27	Coventry City	1–2	Nottingham Forest	Coventry
19:45 BST	King 26'	(Report)	31' McGugan; 36' Earnshaw	Stadium: Ricoh Arena; Attendance: 14,631; Referee: A. D'Urso

5 February 2011 28	Nottingham Forest	1–0	Watford	Nottingham
15:00 BST	Tudgay 1', (yellow card) 88'; Majewski (yellow card) 58'; Konchesky (yellow card) 75'	(Report)	(yellow card) 28' Drinkwater; (yellow card) 30' Eustace	Stadium: City Ground; Attendance: 23,393; Referee: G. Scott

13 February 2011 29	Queens Park Rangers	1–1	Nottingham Forest	Shepherd's Bush, London
13:15 BST	Smith 16'; Taarabt (yellow card) 48'; Gorkss (yellow card) 56'; Derry (yellow card) 61'	(Report)	McGoldrick 26'; Majewski (red card) 23'; Tyson (yellow card) 88'	Stadium: Loftus Road; Attendance: 17,227; Referee: M. Clattenburg

16 February 2011 30	Scunthorpe United	1–0	Nottingham Forest	Scunthorpe
19:45 BST	Gunter 19' (o.g.); Reid (yellow card) 64'; Raynes (yellow card) 77'	(Report)	(yellow card) 48' McKenna	Stadium: Glanford Park; Attendance: 5,578; Referee: M. Russell

19 February 2011 31	Nottingham Forest	2–1	Cardiff City	Nottingham
15:00 BST	Morgan 32'; Earnshaw 68'	(Report)	(yellow card) 57' Olofinjana; (yellow card) 61' Hudson; 65' (pen.) Whittingham; (yellow card) 75' Bothroyd	Stadium: City Ground; Attendance: 26,019; Referee: J. Moss

22 February 2011 32	Nottingham Forest	2–2	Preston North End	Nottingham
19:45 BST	McGugan (yellow card) 41'; Konchesky 54'; McGoldrick (yellow card) 57'; McKenna (yellow card) 83'; Cohen 90+2'	(Report)	16', (yellow card) 64' Nicholson; (yellow card) 75' Ashbee; 90+6', (yellow card) 90+6' Jones	Stadium: City Ground; Attendance: 28,310; Referee: D. Deadman

26 February 2011 33	Millwall	0–0	Nottingham Forest	Bermondsey, London
15:00 BST	Henry (yellow card) 12'; Bouazza (yellow card) 20'; Mkandawire (yellow card) 45'	(Report)	McGoldrick (yellow card) 48'; Tudgay (yellow card) 82'	Stadium: The Den; Attendance: 14,226; Referee: K. Hill

1 March 2011 34	Middlesbrough	1–1	Nottingham Forest	Middlesbrough
19:45 BST	McDonald 51'; Arca (yellow card) 56'; McMahon (yellow card) 67'; Robson (yellow card) 88'	(Report)	(yellow card) 85' McCleary; 90+4' Adebola	Stadium: Riverside Stadium; Attendance: 15,341; Referee: E. Ilderton

5 March 2011 35	Nottingham Forest	0–1	Hull City	Nottingham
15:00 BST	Tudgay (yellow card) 43'	(Report)	64', (yellow card) 67' Fryatt; (yellow card) 90+1' Dawson	Stadium: City Ground; Attendance: 25,119; Referee: S. A. Hooper

8 March 2011 36	Sheffield United	2–1	Nottingham Forest	Sheffield
19:45 BST	Vokes 74'; Lowton 80'; Mattock (yellow card) 60'	Report	42' Adebola; (yellow card) 40' Tudgay; (yellow card) 45' Morgan	Stadium: Bramall Lane; Attendance: 20,547; Referee: A. Bates

12 March 2011 37	Nottingham Forest	0–0	Doncaster	Nottingham
15:00 BST	Morgan (yellow card) 81'	Report	(yellow card) 90+3' Hayter	Stadium: City Ground; Attendance: 25,542; Referee: K. Stroud

19 March 2011 38	Swansea City	3–2	Nottingham Forest	Swansea
15:00 BST	Sinclair 21'; Borini 26', 56'	Report	(yellow card) 34', (goal) 90+3' Anderson; 44' Boyd; (yellow card) 48' Konchesky; (yellow card) 53' Cohen	Stadium: Liberty Stadium; Attendance: 18,371; Referee: S. W. Mathieson

2 April 2011 39	Leeds United	4–1	Nottingham Forest	Leeds
12:45 BST	Howson 51'; Becchio 58'; Bromby (yellow card) 68'; Gradel 73', 87'	Report	(red card) 36' Cohen; (yellow card) 45' Tudgay; (yellow card) 45+3' Boyd; 65' (yellow card) 77' McCleary; (yellow card) 68' Tyson; (yellow card) 73' Morgan	Stadium: Elland Road; Attendance: 29,524; Referee: M. Halsey

9 April 2011 40	Nottingham Forest	3–4	Reading	Nottingham
15:00 BST	Boyd 38' (pen.); Earnshaw 51', (yellow card) 57'; McGugan 87' (pen.)	Report	19' Harte; 54' Karacan; 62', (yellow card) 62' Kébé; (yellow card) 87' Griffin; 90' (o.g.) Chambers	Stadium: City Ground; Attendance: 22,495; Referee: C L Pawson

12 April 2011 41	Nottingham Forest	2–0	Burnley	Nottingham
19:45 BST	McKenna (yellow card) 33'; Konchesky (yellow card) 51'; McGoldrick 73', 90+3'	(Report)	(red card) 32' Bartley; (yellow card) 49' Bikey; (yellow card) 65' Fox; (yellow card) 72' Duff	Stadium: City Ground; Attendance: 19,411; Referee: J Moss

15 April 2011 42	Norwich City	2–1	Nottingham Forest	Norwich
19:45 BST	Holt 10'; Surman 37'	(Report)	3' Tyson; (yellow card) 38' (red card) 90+1' Konchesky	Stadium: Carrow Road; Attendance: 26,188; Referee: N Swarbrick

22 April 2011 43	Nottingham Forest	3–2	Leicester City	Nottingham
17:15 BST	Tudgay 15'; Earnshaw 73'; McKenna 84'	(Report)	(yellow card) 11' Kamara; 21' Oakley; 74' Vassell; (yellow card) 90+4' Vítor	Stadium: City Ground; Attendance: 24,217; Referee: M Clattenburg

25 April 2011 44	Bristol City	2–3	Nottingham Forest	Bristol
15:00 BST	Carey (yellow card) 42'; Elliott 49'; Stead 60'; Jackson (yellow card) 90+3'	(Report)	4', 43' (pen.) Boyd; (yellow card) 31' McGugan; 72' Chambers; (yellow card) 87' Cohen; (yellow card) 90+5' McKenna	Stadium: Ashton Gate Stadium; Attendance: 14,867; Referee: R East

30 April 2011 45	Nottingham Forest	5–1	Scunthorpe United	Nottingham
15:00 BST	Boyd 8', 89'; Chambers 25', 81'; Earnshaw (yellow card) 45' (red card) 88'; Anderson 47'	(Report)	35' (pen.) O'Connor; (yellow card) 52' Miller	Stadium: City Ground; Attendance: 27,949; Referee: D Whitestone

7 May 2011 46	Crystal Palace	0–3	Nottingham Forest	Selhurst, London
12:45 BST	Moxey (red card) 25'	(Report)	17' McGugan; 70' Tudgay; 80' McGoldrick; (yellow card) 90' Gunter	Stadium: Selhurst Park; Attendance: 18,843; Referee: S J Tanner

==== Play-offs ====
12 May 2011 SemiFinal, 1st Leg	Nottingham Forest	0–0	Swansea City	Nottingham
19:45 BST	Gunter (yellow card) 47'; Morgan (yellow card) 51'; McGugan (yellow card) 90'	(Report)	(red card) 2' Taylor; (yellow card) 80' Angel Rangel	Stadium: City Ground; Attendance: 27,881; Referee: M. Dean

16 May 2011 SemiFinal, 2nd Leg	Swansea City	3–1	Nottingham Forest	Swansea
19:45 BST	Britton 28'; Dobbie 33'; Pratley 90+3', (yellow card) 90+3'	(Report)	(yellow card) 25' Gunter; 80' Earnshaw	Stadium: Liberty Stadium; Attendance: 19,816; Referee: A. Marriner

==== Football League Cup ====
10 August 2010 R1	Bradford City	2–1 (a.e.t.)	Nottingham Forest	Bradford
15:00 GMT	Syers 57'; Hanson 100'	(Report)	Thornhill 35'	Stadium: Coral Windows Stadium; Attendance: 5.175; Referee: E. Ilderton

==== FA Cup ====
8 January 2011 R3	Preston North End	1–2	Nottingham Forest	Preston
15:00 GMT	Carter 35'; Russell (yellow card) 90'	(Report)	(yellow card) 25', (goal) 89' Chambers; 50' Anderson; (yellow card) 89' Moussi	Stadium: Deepdale; Attendance: 9,636; Referee: P Crossley

30 January 2011 R4	West Ham United	3–2	Nottingham Forest	Upton Park, London
14:00 GMT	Obinna 4', 42', 52' (pen.); Gabbidon (yellow card) 19'	(Report)	18' Adebola; 40' McGoldrick; (yellow card) 51' Lynch; (yellow card) 65' Gunter	Stadium: Boleyn Ground; Attendance: 29,287; Referee: M. Oliver

=== Pre-season and friendlies ===
18 July 2010 Friendly	S.C. Olhanense	1–2	Nottingham Forest	Olhão, Portugal
21:00 BST	Toy 75'	(Report)	6' Earnshaw; 20' Thornhill	Stadium: Estádio José Arcanjo

21 July 2010 Friendly	Mansfield Town	1–2	Nottingham Forest	Mansfield
19:30 BST	Williams 73' (pen.)	(Report)	10' Tyson; 27' Adebola	Stadium: Field Mill; Attendance: 3,247; Referee: Russell Booth

21 July 2010 Friendly	Tranmere Rovers	2–0	Nottingham Forest	Birkenhead
19:30 BST	Wood 45'; Thomas-Moore 63'	(Report)		Stadium: Prenton Park; Referee: Mike Dean

24 July 2010 Friendly	Peterborough United	1–0	Nottingham Forest	Peterborough
15:00 BST	Boyd 8'	(Report)		Stadium: London Road Stadium; Referee: Kevin Wright

25 July 2010 Friendly	Kidderminster Harriers	3–0	Nottingham Forest	Kidderminster
15:00 BST	Morris 30'; McPhee 34', 45'	(Report)		Stadium: Aggborough; Attendance: 859; Referee: S. Bratt

28 July 2010 Friendly	Nottingham Forest	1–3	Olympique Lyonnais	Nottingham
19:30 BST	Adebola 34'	(Report)	8', 40' Gomis; 63' Briand	Stadium: City Ground; Attendance: 7,178; Referee: P. Walton

31 July 2010 Friendly	Swindon Town	3–2	Nottingham Forest	Swindon
15:00 BST	Dossevi 8', 29'; Wilson 67' (o.g.)	(Report)	21', 25' McCleary	Stadium: County Ground; Attendance: 3,799; Referee: Andy Woolmer
