= 2007–08 Nottingham Forest F.C. season =

English football club season

Nottingham Forest
2007–08 season
- Chairman: Nigel Doughty
- Manager: Colin Calderwood
- Football League One: 2nd (promoted)
- FA Cup: Second round
- League Cup: Second round
- Football League Trophy: First round
- Top goalscorer: League: Junior Agogo (13); All: Junior Agogo (13)
- Highest home attendance: 28,520 vs Yeovil Town (League One, 3 May 2008)
- Lowest home attendance: 3,102 vs Peterborough United (Football League Trophy, 4 September 2008)
Home colours	Away colours	Third colours

The 2007–08 season was Nottingham Forest's third consecutive season in League One. The season was regarded a success with the team gaining promotion back to the Championship at the third attempt.

Forest's players were also successful on an individual level in the 2007–08 season, with Julian Bennett and Kris Commons in the PFA League One Team of the Year, while Paul Smith ended the season with 24 clean sheets in 46 games, the record for the league in that season. This achievement was recognised when he received the Puma Golden Glove award.

== Team kit ==
Supplier: Umbro
Sponsor(s): Capital One

Home	Away	Third

Source: Wikipedia Nottingham Forest Article

== Season overview ==
In the 2007–08 campaign, Forest were named title favourites for the third consecutive year. Calderwood signed five players in summer 2007, most notably former Celtic captain Neil Lennon on a free transfer. Also captured were left-back Matt Lockwood from Leyton Orient, Preston North End defender Kelvin Wilson and Yeovil Town duo midfielder Chris Cohen and attacking winger Arron Davies all signing for undisclosed fees.

Forest started the 2007–08 campaign by failing to win in their first six competitive games. The Reds drew three times and lost 2–1 at home to rivals Leeds United, as well as losing 3–2 to Peterborough United in the Football League Trophy. However, Forest then hit an eight-game unbeaten run in the league (including five wins), scoring seventeen goals in the process. After losing to Luton, Forest went on another unbeaten run, this time of six games in all competitions. This briefly took Forest to the top of the league table over Christmas, the first time they had been top all season.

But they lost top spot as they failed to win away from home, in a run lasting seven games. After moving back into second place, Forest's away form once again was found lacking, which allowed Carlisle and Doncaster to overtake them into second and third place, respectively. Forest went on to collect just one win in seven games.

However, they turned their form around, and after being 11 points behind second-place at one point. A win Carlisle saw Forest then win six out of their last seven games of the season. Forest, who had only been in the automatic promotion places once all season got promoted to the Championship on a dramatic last day of the season, by beating Yeovil 3–2 at the City Ground to secure second place. The Reds kept a league record of 24 clean sheets out of 46 games, which helped them end their three-year spell in the league's third tier and gain their first promotion in ten years.

== Pre-season and friendlies ==
=== Results ===
Date	Opponents	H / A	Result F–A	Scorers	Attendance
17 July 2007	Ilkeston Town	A	5–0	Thornhill (2) 48', 58', Sinclair 79', Brown (2) 83', 89'	1,180
18 July 2007	Rushden & Diamonds	A	1–1	Davies 90'	1,210
21 July 2007	Chesterfield	A	0–1		2,796
24 July 2007	Kilmarnock	A	3–1	Holt (3) 19' (pen.), 39' (pen.), 51' (pen.)	2,524
26 July 2007	Dunfermline Athletic	A	1–2	Sinclair 24'	1,756
28 July 2007	Motherwell	A	0–0		2,505
30 July 2007	Notts County	A	2–1	Chambers (2) 4', 85'	7,070
31 July 2007	Derby County	A	0–2		25,159
4 August 2007	Sheffield United	A	0–1		5,676

== League One ==
=== Results ===
Date	Opponents	H / A	Result F–A	Scorers	Attendance	League position
11 August 2007	Bournemouth	H	0–0		18,791	16th
18 August 2007	Swansea City	A	0–0		17,220	15th
25 August 2007	Leeds United	H	1–2	Commons 50'	25,237	18th
1 September 2007	Bristol Rovers	A	2–2	Anthony (og) 29', Holt 45+1'	9,080	18th
15 September 2007	Port Vale	A	2–0	Edwards (og) 3', Chambers 86'	6,521	14th
22 September 2007	Gillingham	H	4–0	Agogo (3) 43', 61', 73', Sinclair 84'	16,330	10th
29 September 2007	Yeovil Town	A	3–0	Chambers 57', Agogo 79', Commons 84'	6,818	8th
2 October 2007	Huddersfield Town	A	1–1	Commons 75'	10,994	8th
6 October 2007	Hartlepool United	H	2–1	Commons 11', Agogo 83'	17,520	5th
13 October 2007	Cheltenham Town	A	3–0	Commons (3) 11', 45+1', 66'	5,012	3rd
20 October 2007	Doncaster Rovers	H	0–0		23,108	4th
27 October 2007	Luton Town	A	1–2	Bennett 90+1'	8,524	7th
30 October 2007	Oldham Athletic	H	0–0		16,423	6th
3 November 2007	Tranmere Rovers	H	2–0	Agogo 50'(pen), Tyson 78'	16,825	4th
6 November 2007	Southend United	H	4–1	Breckin 41', Tyson 65', Agogo (2) 73', 88'	26,094	2nd
24 November 2007	Crewe Alexandra	H	2–0	Davies 45', Clingan 52'	16,650	2nd
4 December 2007	Walsall	A	0–1		6,605	4th
7 December 2007	Brighton & Hove Albion	A	2–0	Tyson (2) 30', 49'	6,536	2nd
15 December 2007	Northampton Town	H	2–2	McGugan 15', Agogo 90'	17,081	3rd
22 December 2007	Port Vale	H	2–0	Agogo 24', McGugan 67'	21,407	1st
26 December 2007	Oldham Athletic	A	0–0		8,140	2nd
29 December 2007	Gillingham	A	0–3		7,712	2nd
1 January 2008	Huddersfield Town	H	2–1	Cohen 68', McGugan 90+2'	18,762	2nd
12 January 2008	Leyton Orient	H	4–0	Holt (2) 31', 54'(pen), Commons 72', Thornhill 89'	17,805	2nd
19 January 2008	Swindon Town	A	1–2	Chambers 63'	9,815	3rd
23 January 2008	Millwall	A	2–2	Cohen 85', Tyson 88'	8,436	2nd
29 January 2008	Swansea city	H	0–0		21,065	3rd
2 February 2008	Bournemouth	A	0–2		7,251	4th
9 February 2008	Millwall	H	2–0	Bennett 48', Chambers 58'	17,046	3rd
12 February 2008	Leeds United	A	1–1	Bennett 69'	29,552	4th
16 February 2008	Swindon Town	H	1–0	Tyson 50'	23,439	3rd
23 February 2008	Leyton Orient	A	1–0	Agogo 61'	7,136	2nd
3 March 2008	Carlisle United	H	0–1		28,487	4th
8 March 2008	Crewe Alexandra	A	0–0		6,341	4th
11 March 2008	Southend United	A	1–1	Thornhill 65'	8,376	4th
15 March 2008	Walsall	H	1–1	Ormerod 49'	17,177	4th
21 March 2008	Northampton Town	A	2–1	Ormerod 9', Tyson 63'(pen)	7,244	4th
24 March 2008	Brighton & Hove Albion	H	0–0		18,165	4th
28 March 2008	Doncaster Rovers	A	0–1		12,508	4th
1 April 2008	Carlisle United	A	2–0	Chambers 76', McCleary 90+3'	9,979	4th
5 April 2008	Cheltenham Town	H	3–1	Agogo (2) 26', 47', Chambers 45'	19,860	4th
8 April 2008	Bristol Rovers	H	1–1	McGugan 33'	15,860	5th
12 April 2008	Tranmere Rovers	A	2–0	Tyson 34', Morgan 51'	8,689	4th
19 April 2008	Luton Town	H	1–0	Tyson 67'	17,331	4th
26 April 2008	Hartlepool United	A	1–0	McGugan 84'	5,206	3rd
3 May 2008	Yeovil Town	H	3–2	Bennett 12', Commons 18', McGugan 28'	28,520	2nd

=== League table ===
Pos	Team	Pld	W	D	L	GF	GA	GD	Pts	Promotion, qualification or relegation
1	Swansea City (C, P)	46	27	11	8	82	42	+40	92	Promotion to Football League Championship
2	Nottingham Forest (P)	46	22	16	8	64	32	+32	82	Promotion to Football League Championship
3	Doncaster Rovers (O, P)	46	23	11	12	65	41	+24	80	Qualification for League One play-offs
4	Carlisle United	46	23	11	12	64	46	+18	80	Qualification for League One play-offs
5	Leeds United	46	27	10	9	72	38	+34	76 (Note: Leeds deducted 15 points for failure to comply with rules on insolvency.)	Qualification for League One play-offs

Updated to match(es) played on unknown. Source: The Football League
Rules for classification: 1) points; 2) goal difference; 3) number of goals scored.
(C) Champions; (O) Play-off winners; (P) Promoted

== FA Cup ==
=== Results ===
Date	Round	Opponents	H / A	Result F – A	Scorers	Attendance
10 November 2007	Round 1	Lincoln City	A	1–1	McGugan 25'	7,361
27 November 2007	Round 1 replay	Lincoln City	H	3–1	Commons 35', Tyson (2) 49', 61'	6,783
11 December 2007	Round 2	Luton Town	A	0–1		5,758

== League Cup ==
=== Results ===
Date	Round	Opponents	H / A	Result F – A	Scorers	Attendance
14 August 2007	Round 1	Chester City	A	0–0 (4–2p)		2,720
28 August 2007	Round 2	Leicester City	H		Match abandoned at half time	15,638
18 September 2007	Round 2	Leicester City	H	2–3	Smith 1', Tyson 64'	15,519

== Football League Trophy ==
=== Results ===
Date	Round	Opponents	H / A	Result F – A	Scorers	Attendance
4 September 2007	Round 1	Peterborough United	H	2–3	Chambers (2) 33', 49'	3,102

== Squad statistics ==
=== Appearances and goals ===
The statistics for the following players are for their time during 2007–08 season playing for Nottingham Forest. Any stats from a different club during 2007–08 are not included.

- Grant Holt's red card was for two yellow cards
- Nottingham Forest also had two own goals scored for them during 2007–08

No.	Pos.	Name	League		FA Cup		League Cup		Football League Trophy		Total		Discipline	
No.	Pos.	Name	Apps	Goals	Apps	Goals	Apps	Goals	Apps	Goals	Apps	Goals	Yellow card	Red card
1	GK	(England) Paul Smith	46	0	3	0	2	1	1	0	52	1	0	0
2	DF	(England) Kelvin Wilson (vc)	40 (2)	0	3	0	2	0	0	0	45 (2)	0	4	1
3	DF	(England) Matt Lockwood	11	0	1	0	0	0	0	0	12	0	1	0
4	DF	(England) Luke Chambers	40 (2)	5	3	0	2	0	1	2	46 (2)	7	3	0
5	DF	(England) Wes Morgan	37 (5)	1	1	0	2	0	1	0	41 (5)	1	6	0
6	DF	(England) Ian Breckin (c)	22 (6)	1	2	0	0	0	1	0	25 (6)	1	6	0
7	MF	(England) James Perch	19 (11)	0	1 (1)	0	0 (1)	0	1	0	21 (13)	0	1	1
8	MF	(Scotland) Kris Commons	29 (10)	9	2 (1)	1	2	0	1	0	34 (11)	10	2	0
9	FW	(England) Nathan Tyson	26 (8)	9	3	2	1	1	1	0	31 (8)	12	2	0
10	FW	(England) Grant Holt	22 (10)	3	1	0	1 (1)	0	0	0	24 (11)	3	5	1*
11	FW	(Scotland) Scott Dobie	1 (1)	0	0	0	1	0	0	0	2 (1)	0	0	0
11	FW	(England) Will Hoskins	2	0	0	0	0	0	0	0	2	0	0	0
12	MF	(England) Garath McCleary	3 (5)	1	0	0	0	0	0	0	3 (5)	1	0	0
13	MF	(Germany) Felix Bastians	0 (1)	0	0	0	1	0	1	0	2 (1)	0	0	0
14	MF	(Wales) Arron Davies	9 (10)	1	1 (2)	0	0	0	0	0	10 (12)	1	2	0
15	MF	(England) Chris Cohen	40 (1)	2	3	0	1	0	0	0	44 (1)	2	5	0
16	MF	(Northern Ireland) Sammy Clingan	40 (2)	1	2	0	2	0	0	0	44 (2)	1	6	1
17	MF	(England) Lewis McGugan	25 (8)	6	3	1	0	0	0	0	28 (8)	7	5	0
18	MF	(Northern Ireland) Neil Lennon	15 (3)	0	1	0	2	0	0(1)	0	18 (4)	0	4	0
18	ST	(England) Brett Ormerod	13	2	0	0	0	0	0	0	13	2	0	0
20	GK	(Greece) Dimitrios Konstantopoulos	0	0	0	0	0	0	0	0	0	0	0	0
23	FW	(Ghana) Junior Agogo	27 (8)	13	1 (2)	0	1 (1)	0	1	0	30 (11)	13	0	0
24	FW	(England) Emile Sinclair	0 (12)	1	0	0	0 (1)	0	0 (1)	0	0 (14)	1	0	0
25	MF	(Republic of Ireland) Alan Power	0	0	0	0	0	0	1	0	1	0	0	0
26	MF	(England) Matt Thornhill	5 (9)	2	0 (1)	0	0 (1)	0	0	0	5 (11)	2	1	0
27	DF	(Republic of Ireland) Brendan Moloney	2	0	0	0	0	0	0	0	2	0	0	0
28	DF	(England) Joe Heath	0	0	0	0	0	0	0	0	0	0	0	0
29	DF	(England) Julian Bennett	33 (1)	4	2	0	2	0	1	0	38 (1)	4	8	0
30	GK	(England) Dale Roberts	0	0	0	0	0	0	0	0	0	0	0	0
31	MF	(Republic of Ireland) Mark Byrne	0 (1)	0	0	0	0	0	0	0	0 (1)	0	0	0
32	GK	(Republic of Ireland) Shane Redmond	0	0	0	0	0	0	0	0	0	0	0	0
37	MF	(England) James Reid	0	0	0	0	0	0	0	0	0	0	0	0
38	GK	(England) Barry Richardson	0	0	0	0	0	0	0	0	0	0	0	0
39	DF	(Algeria) Hamza Bencherif	0	0	0	0	0	0	0	0	0	0	0	0

== Transfers ==
=== In ===
Date	Position	Name	From	Fee
12 June 2007	MF	(Northern Ireland) Neil Lennon	Celtic	Free
5 July 2007	DF	(England) Matt Lockwood	Leyton Orient	Undisclosed
6 July 2007	MF	(Wales) Arron Davies	Yeovil Town	Undisclosed
6 July 2007	MF	(England) Chris Cohen	Yeovil Town	Undisclosed
16 July 2007	DF	(England) Kelvin Wilson	Preston North End	£300,000
22 January 2008	MF	(England) Garath McCleary	Bromley	Undisclosed

=== Out ===
Date	Position	Name	To	Fee
4 June 2007	FW	(England) Jack Lester	Chesterfield	Free
15 June 2007	DF	(Republic of Ireland) John Thompson	Oldham Athletic	Free
30 June 2007	DF	(England) John Curtis	Queens Park Rangers	Free
1 July 2007	DF	(England) Nicky Eaden	Free Agency	Released
1 July 2007	MF	(England) Kevin James	Free Agency	Released
1 July 2007	MF	(England) Robert Hughes	Free Agency	Released
1 July 2007	GK	(Denmark) Rune Pedersen	Free Agency	Released
1 July 2007	DF	(France) Vincent Fernandez	Free Agency	Released
12 July 2007	MF	(Scotland) Gary Holt	Wycombe Wanderers	Free
23 January 2008	FW	(Scotland) Scott Dobie	Carlisle United	Nominal
30 January 2008	FW	(England) David Brown	Bradford City	Free
31 January 2008	MF	(Northern Ireland) Neil Lennon	Wycombe Wanderers	Free

=== Loan In ===
Date From	Date Until	Pos.	Name	From
8 February 2008	13 April 2008	FW	(England) Will Hoskins	Watford
7 March 2008	4 May 2008	FW	(England) Brett Ormerod	Preston North End
25 March 2008	4 May 2008	GK	(Greece) Dimitrios Konstantopoulos	Coventry City

=== Loan Out ===
Date	Pos.	Name	To
5 July 2007	GK	(England) Paddy Gamble	Stalybridge Celtic
1 October 2007	DF	(Algeria) Hamza Bencherif	Lincoln City
1 October 2007	MF	(Germany) Felix Bastians	Chesterfield
22 November 2007	FW	(England) Emile Sinclair	Brentford
22 November 2007	DF	(England) Tom Sharpe	Bury
22 November 2007	MF	(Republic of Ireland) Alan Power	Grays Athletic
4 January 2008	MF	(Germany) Felix Bastians	Notts County
10 January 2008	DF	(Republic of Ireland) Brendan Moloney	Chesterfield
11 January 2008	DF	(England) Tom Sharpe	Halifax Town
23 January 2008	GK	(England) Dale Roberts	Rushden and Diamonds
14 February 2008	MF	(Germany) Felix Bastians	Milton Keynes Dons
20 March 2008	FW	(England) Grant Holt	Blackpool
