= 2006–07 Nottingham Forest F.C. season =

English football club season

Nottingham Forest
2006–07 season
- Chairman: Nigel Doughty
- Manager: Colin Calderwood
- Football League One: 4th
- Play-offs: Semi-final
- FA Cup: Fourth round
- League Cup: First round
- Football League Trophy: Southern Area quarter-final
- Top goalscorer: League: Grant Holt (14); All: Grant Holt (18)
Home colours	Away colours	Third colours

The 2006–07 season was Nottingham Forest's 2nd consecutive season in the League One.

== Pre-season and friendlies ==
=== Results ===
Win	Draw	Loss

Date	Opponents	H / A	Result F–A	Scorers	Attendance	Ref.
14 July 2006	Ilkeston Town	A	5–0	Commons 8', Harris 9', James 13', Tyson 79', Muller (og) 85'	2,254	
17 July 2006	Rushden & Diamonds	A	2–0	Lester (2) 15', 81'(pen)	4,174	
19 July 2006	Milton Keynes Dons	A	0–0		2,680	
22 July 2006	Mansfield Town	A	0–1	Match abandoned after 71 mins due to a storm	5,329	
26 July 2006	Lincoln City	A	0–1		2,386	
29 July 2006	Leeds United	H	2–3	Tyson 41', Holt 47'	8,513	

== League One ==
=== Results ===
Win	Draw	Loss

Date	Opponents	H / A	Result F–A	Scorers	Attendance	League position	Ref.
5 August 2006	Bradford City	H	1–0	Bennett 10'	19,665	5th	
8 August 2006	Blackpool	A	2–0	Lester 45', Gr. Holt 73'	7,635	2nd	
12 August 2006	Northampton Town	A	1–0	Doig (o.g.) 46'	7,172	2nd	
19 August 2006	Brighton & Hove Albion	H	2–1	Gr. Holt (2) 63'(pen.), 78'	18,686	2nd	
26 August 2006	Huddersfield Town	A	1–1	Gr. Holt 34'	11,720	1st	
2 September 2006	Chesterfield	H	4–0	Lester 35', Harris 45+1', Gr. Holt 49'(pen), Southall 69'	19,480	1st	
9 September 2006	Yeovil Town	A	1–0	Gr. Holt 88'	6,925	1st	
12 September 2006	Oldham Athletic	H	0–2		17,446	1st	
16 September 2006	Carlisle United	H	0–0		19,535	1st	
23 September 2006	Tranmere Rovers	A	0–0		11,444	1st	
26 September 2006	Port Vale	A	1–1	Breckin 33'	7,388	1st	
30 September 2006	Swansea City	H	3–1	Perch 54', Commons 56', Agogo 67'	19,034	1st	
7 October 2006	Scunthorpe United	H	0–4		22,640	1st	
14 October 2006	Gillingham	A	1–0	Southall 57'	7,800	1st	
21 October 2006	Bristol City	H	1–0	Southall 9'	23,466	1st	
28 October 2006	Cheltenham Town	A	2–0	Southall (2) 32', 36'	6,554	1st	
4 November 2006	Brentford	H	2–0	Commons (2) 10', 37'	18,003	1st	
18 November 2006	Rotherham United	A	1–1	Tyson 88'	7,809	1st	
25 November 2006	Millwall	H	3–1	Agogo 65', Perch 67', Breckin 82'	19,410	1st	
5 December 2006	Bournemouth	A	0–2		7,067	1st	
9 December 2006	Crewe Alexandra	A	4–1	Gr. Holt 32', Tyson (3) 37', 43', 45'	7,253	1st	
16 December 2006	Leyton Orient	H	1–3	Breckin 58'	23,109	1st	
23 December 2006	Doncaster Rovers	A	0–1		8,923	1st	
26 December 2006	Port Vale	H	3–0	Tyson 13', Gr. Holt (2) 66', 90+3'	22,999	1st	
30 December 2006	Tranmere Rovers	H	1–1	Perch 72'	19,729	2nd	
1 January 2007	Oldham Athletic	A	0–5		9,768	3rd	
13 January 2007	Yeovil Town	H	1–0	Holt 48'	17,885	1st	
20 January 2007	Swansea City	A	0–0		16,849	3rd	
31 January 2007	Carlisle United	A	0–1		9,022	4th	
3 February 2007	Bradford City	A	2–2	Tyson 10', Lester 18'	10,160	3rd	
10 February 2007	Northampton Town	H	1–0	Bennett 66'	24,567	3rd	
17 February 2007	Brighton & Hove Albion	A	1–2	Lester 55'	7,749	4th	
20 February 2007	Blackpool	H	1–1	Agogo 16'	16,849	4th	
24 February 2007	Chesterfield	A	2–1	Agogo 56', 62' pen.	6,641	3rd	
3 March 2007	Huddersfield Town	H	5–1	Agogo 6', 60', McGugan 17', Gr. Holt 19', Perch 33'	19,070	2nd	
6 March 2007	Doncaster Rovers	H	0–1		16,785	2nd	
10 March 2007	Scunthorpe United	A	1–1	Commons 18'	8,906	4th	
17 March 2007	Gillingham	H	1–0	McGugan 85'	17,950	3rd	
24 March 2007	Cheltenham Town	H	3–0	Ga. Holt 33', Perch 57', Tyson 90' pen.	22,640	3rd	
31 March 2007	Bristol City	A	1–1	Gr. Holt 5'	19,249	3rd	
7 April 2007	Millwall	A	0–1		12,035	3rd	
9 April 2007	Rotherham United	H	1–1	Gr. Holt 21' pen.	27,875	3rd	
14 April 2007	Brentford	A	4–2	Prutton 52', Commons 68', 90', Gr. Holt 74' pen.	6,637	3rd	
21 April 2007	Bournemouth	H	3–0	Commons 23', 54', Prutton 66'	19,898	3rd	
28 April 2007	Leyton Orient	A	3–1	Lester 18', 58', Commons 29'	7,206	3rd	
5 May 2007	Crewe Alexandra	H	0–0		27,472	4th	

=== League table ===
Pos	Team	Pld	W	D	L	GF	GA	GD	Pts	Promotion, qualification or relegation
2	Bristol City (P)	46	25	10	11	63	39	+24	85	Promotion to Football League Championship
3	Blackpool (O, P)	46	24	11	11	76	49	+27	83	Qualification for League One play-offs
4	Nottingham Forest	46	23	13	10	65	41	+24	82	Qualification for League One play-offs
5	Yeovil Town	46	23	10	13	55	39	+16	79	Qualification for League One play-offs
6	Oldham Athletic	46	21	12	13	69	47	+22	75	Qualification for League One play-offs

Rules for classification: In the Football League goals scored (GF) takes precedence over goal difference (GD).
(O) Play-off winners; (P) Promoted

=== Play-offs ===
Round	Date	Opponents	H / A	Result F–A	Scorers	Attendance	Ref.
Semi-final, first leg	11 May 2007	Yeovil Town	A	2–0	Commons 23 pen., Perch 90 pen.	8,935	
Semi-final, second leg	18 May 2007	Yeovil Town	H	2–5 (a.e.t.)	Dobie 47', Ga. Holt 93'	27,819	

== FA Cup ==
=== Results ===
Win	Draw	Loss

Round	Date	Opponents	H / A	Result F–A	Scorers	Attendance	Ref.
First round	11 November 2006	Yeading	H	5–0	Commons (3) 19', 32', 45+1', Agogo (2) 54 (pen.), 63'	7,704	
Second round	3 December 2006	Salisbury City	A	1–1	Tyson 27'	3,100	
Second round replay	12 December 2006	Salisbury City	H	2–0	Tyson 53', Southall 81'	6,177	
Third round	6 January 2007	Charlton Athletic	H	2–0	Agogo 28', Gr. Holt 32'	19,017	
Fourth round	28 January 2007	Chelsea	A	0–3		41,516	

== League Cup ==
=== Results ===
Win	Draw	Loss

Round	Date	Opponents	H / A	Result F–A	Scorers	Attendance	Ref.
First round	21 August 2006	Accrington Stanley	A	0–1		2,146	

== Johnstone's Paint Trophy ==
=== Results ===
Win	Draw	Loss

Round	Date	Opponents	H / A	Result F–A	Scorers	Attendance	Ref.
First round	18 October 2006	Gillingham	A	2–1	Lester 7', Gr. Holt 55'	1,647	
Second round	31 October 2006	Brentford	H	2–1	Southall 47', Gr. Holt 56'	2,031	
Area quarter-final	29 November 2006	Bristol City	H	2–2 (2–4p)	Morgan 45+1', Gr. Holt 79'	4,107	

== Squad statistics ==
=== Appearances and goals ===
No.	Pos	Nat	Player	Total		League One		FA Cup		League Cup		Johnstone's Paint Trophy	
No.	Pos	Nat	Player	Apps	Goals	Apps	Goals	Apps	Goals	Apps	Goals	Apps	Goals
1	GK	(England) ENG	Paul Smith	52	0	47	0	4	0	1	0	0	0
2	DF	(England) ENG	Nicky Eaden	0	0	0	0	0	0	0	0	0	0
3	DF	(Argentina) ARG	Gino Padula	1	0	0	0	0	0	1	0	0	0
3	DF	(England) ENG	Luke Chambers	16	0	12+4	0	0	0	0	0	0	0
4	MF	(Scotland) SCO	Gary Holt	48	2	32+9	2	5	0	1	0	1	0
5	DF	(England) ENG	Wes Morgan	49	1	31+9	0	5	0	1	0	3	1
6	DF	(England) ENG	Ian Breckin	54	3	48	3	4	0	1	0	1	0
7	MF	(England) ENG	David Prutton	13	2	11+2	2	0	0	0	0	0	0
7	MF	(England) ENG	Nicky Southall	35	7	26+1	5	4+1	1	0+1	0	2	1
8	MF	(Scotland) SCO	Kris Commons	40	13	30+4	10	3	3	0	0	1+2	0
9	FW	(England) ENG	Nathan Tyson	30	9	12+12	7	4+1	2	0	0	1	0
10	FW	(Scotland) SCO	Scott Dobie	26	1	4+17	1	0+4	0	0	0	0+1	0
11	FW	(England) ENG	Grant Holt	55	18	34+12	14	4+1	1	0+1	0	3	3
12	DF	(England) ENG	Alan Wright	11	0	11	0	0	0	0	0	0	0
12	MF	(England) ENG	Ross Gardner	0	0	0	0	0	0	0	0	0	0
14	FW	(England) ENG	Jack Lester	45	7	26+11	6	0+4	0	0+1	0	3	1
15	FW	(England) ENG	Neil Harris	24	1	11+8	1	1+1	0	1	0	0+2	0
15	MF	(England) ENG	James Henry	1	0	0+1	0	0	0	0	0	0	0
16	MF	(Northern Ireland) NIR	Sammy Clingan	35	0	25+3	0	2+1	0	1	0	3	0
17	MF	(England) ENG	James Perch	55	6	45+3	6	4	0	0	0	3	0
18	DF	(Republic of Ireland) IRL	John Thompson	16	0	6+8	0	0	0	1	0	1	0
20	GK	(Denmark) DEN	Rune Pedersen	5	0	1	0	1	0	0	0	3	0
21	DF	(England) ENG	John Curtis	49	0	40+3	0	4	0	1	0	1	0
22	DF	(England) ENG	Danny Cullip	25	0	19+1	0	3	0	1	0	1	0
23	FW	(Ghana) GHA	Junior Agogo	34	10	20+9	7	4	3	0	0	1	0
24	MF	(England) ENG	James Beaumont	0	0	0	0	0	0	0	0	0	0
25	MF	(England) ENG	Kevin James	0	0	0	0	0	0	0	0	0	0
26	FW	(Jamaica) JAM	David Johnson	0	0	0	0	0	0	0	0	0	0
27	MF	(England) ENG	Robert Hughes	4	0	0+2	0	0	0	0	0	1+1	0
29	DF	(England) ENG	Julian Bennett	37	2	24+7	2	3	0	0	0	3	0
30	FW	(England) ENG	Spencer Weir-Daley	3	0	0+2	0	0	0	1	0	0	0
33	DF	(France) FRA	Vincent Fernandez	2	0	0	0	0	0	0	0	1+1	0
34	GK	(England) ENG	Paddy Gamble	0	0	0	0	0	0	0	0	0	0
35	FW	(United States) USA	Jon-Paul Pittman	0	0	0	0	0	0	0	0	0	0
35	DF	(Republic of Ireland) IRL	Brendan Moloney	1	0	0+1	0	0	0	0	0	0	0
36	MF	(Germany) GER	Felix Bastians	2	0	0+2	0	0	0	0	0	0	0
37	MF	(England) ENG	Lewis McGugan	18	2	13+2	2	0+1	0	0	0	0+2	0
38	GK	(Republic of Ireland) IRL	Shane Redmond	0	0	0	0	0	0	0	0	0	0
39	DF	(Algeria) ALG	Hamza Bencherif	0	0	0	0	0	0	0	0	0	0

=== Top scorers ===
Includes all competitive matches. The list is sorted by league goals when total goals are equal.

Position	Nation	Number	Name	Championship	League Cup	FA Cup	Johnstone's Paint Trophy	Total
1	(England)	11	Grant Holt	14	0	1	3	18
2	(Scotland)	8	Kris Commons	10	0	3	0	13
3	(Ghana)	23	Junior Agogo	7	0	3	0	10
4	(England)	9	Nathan Tyson	7	0	2	0	9
5	(England)	7	Nicky Southall	5	0	1	1	7
=	(England)	14	Jack Lester	6	0	0	1	7
7	(England)	17	James Perch	6	0	0	0	6
8	(England)	6	Ian Breckin	3	0	0	0	3
9	(Scotland)	4	Gary Holt	2	0	0	0	2
=	(England)	7	David Prutton	2	0	0	0	2
=	(England)	29	Julian Bennett	2	0	0	0	2
=	(England)	37	Lewis McGugan	2	0	0	0	2
13	(Scotland)	10	Scott Dobie	1	0	0	0	1
=	(England)	15	Neil Harris	1	0	0	0	1
=	(England)	5	Wes Morgan	0	0	0	1	1
			Own Goals	1	0	0	0	1
			TOTALS	69	0	10	6	85

== Transfers ==
=== In ===
#	Pos	Player	From	Fee	Date
1	GK	(England) Paul Smith	(England) Southampton	£500,000	11 July 2006
23	FW	(Ghana) Junior Agogo	(England) Bristol Rovers	Undisclosed	30 August 2006
3	DF	(England) Luke Chambers	(England) Northampton Town	Undisclosed	30 January 2007

=== Out ===
#	Pos	Player	To	Fee	Date
-	MF	(Germany) Eugen Bopp	(England) Rotherham United	Free	3 August 2006
24	MF	(England) James Beaumont	(England) Northwich Victoria	Free	29 December 2006
15	FW	(England) Neil Harris	(England) Millwall	Free	9 January 2007
12	MF	(England) Ross Gardner	(England) Port Vale	Free	9 January 2007
7	MF	(England) Nicky Southall	(England) Gillingham	Free	31 January 2007
22	DF	(England) Danny Cullip	(England) Queens Park Rangers	Free	31 January 2007

=== Loan In ===
#	Pos	Player	From	Start	End
7	MF	(England) David Prutton	(England) Southampton	30 January 2007	19 May 2007
12	DF	(England) Alan Wright	(England) Sheffield United	16 March 2007	19 May 2007
15	MF	(England) James Henry	(England) Reading	22 March 2007	8 April 2007

=== Loan Out ===
#	Pos	Player	To	Start	End
25	MF	(England) Kevin James	(England) Yeovil Town	3 August 2006	3 September 2006
35	FW	(United States) Jon-Paul Pittman	(England) Bury	3 August 2006	17 September 2006
33	DF	(France) Vincent Fernandez	(England) Wycombe Wanderers	30 August 2006	7 October 2006
2	DF	(England) Nicky Eaden	(England) Lincoln City	31 August 2006	1 January 2007
30	FW	(England) Spencer Weir-Daley	(England) Macclesfield Town	31 August 2006	30 November 2006
18	DF	(Republic of Ireland) John Thompson	(England) Tranmere Rovers	26 October 2006	6 December 2006
25	MF	(England) Kevin James	(England) Grimsby Town	27 October 2006	27 November 2006
36	MF	(Germany) Felix Bastians	(England) Northwich Victoria	2 November 2006	2 January 2007
12	MF	(England) Ross Gardner	(England) Port Vale	8 November 2006	8 January 2007
33	DF	(France) Vincent Fernandez	(England) Blackpool	23 November 2006	2 January 2007
30	FW	(England) Spencer Weir-Daley	(England) Lincoln City	1 January 2007	18 March 2007
33	DF	(France) Vincent Fernandez	(England) Grays Athletic	3 January 2007	3 February 2007
36	MF	(Germany) Felix Bastians	(England) Halifax Town	25 January 2007	17 March 2007
18	DF	(Republic of Ireland) John Thompson	(England) Tranmere Rovers	31 January 2007	6 May 2007
2	DF	(England) Nicky Eaden	(England) Lincoln City	31 January 2007	18 May 2007
36	MF	(Germany) Felix Bastians	(England) Gillingham	22 March 2007	15 April 2007
25	MF	(England) Kevin James	(England) Swindon Town	22 March 2007	6 May 2007
30	FW	(England) Spencer Weir-Daley	(England) Bradford City	22 March 2007	29 April 2007
34	GK	(England) Paddy Gamble	(England) York City	26 March 2007	8 May 2007
