= Kelvin Wilson =

English footballer

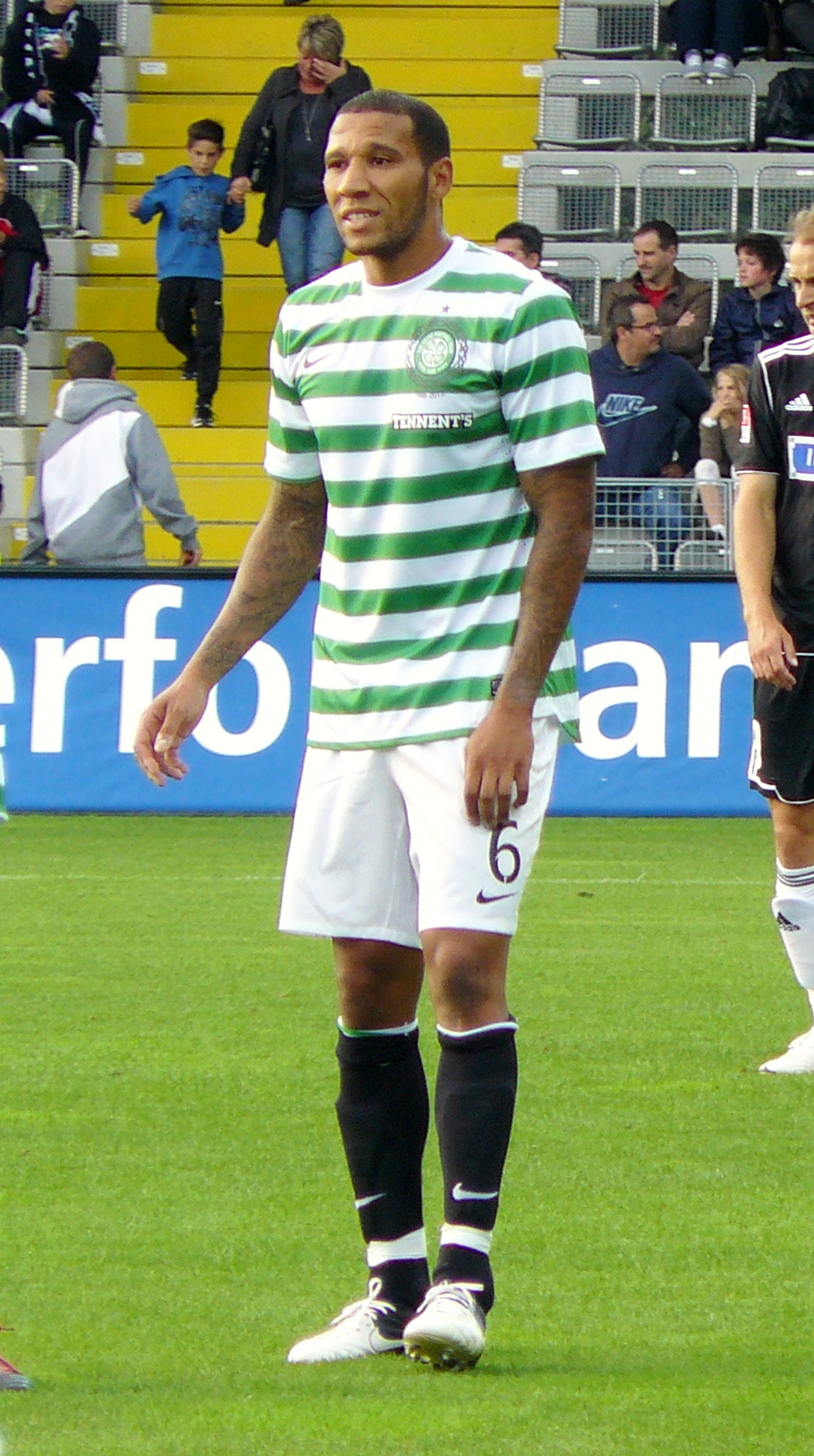
- Wilson playing for Celtic in 2012

Personal information
- Full name: Kelvin James Wilson
- Date of birth: 3 September 1985 (age 41)
- Place of birth: Nottingham, England
- Position: Centre back

Team information
- Current team: Ilkeston Town

Senior career*
Years	Team	Apps	(Gls)
2003–2006	Notts County	78	(3)
2006–2007	Preston North End	27	(1)
2007–2011	Nottingham Forest	123	(0)
2011–2013	Celtic	47	(0)
2013–2016	Nottingham Forest	46	(0)
2016–2017	Rotherham United	8	(0)
2020–	Ilkeston Town	0	(0)
- * Club domestic league appearances and goals as of 10:23, 8 May 2017 (UTC)

Kelvin James Wilson (born 3 September 1985) is an English professional footballer who plays as a centre back for Ilkeston Town.

He started his career with Notts County, before moving to Preston North End in 2006. Nottingham Forest signed him one year later for £300,000. He moved to Celtic in 2011 on a free transfer. On 9 August 2013, Wilson re-signed for Nottingham Forest for a fee of £2.5 million.

== Club career ==
=== Early career ===
Wilson started his career at Notts County, making his debut for the club in a 4–0 loss to Hartlepool United on 17 April 2004. In 2004–05 he became a regular in their back-line and was named Players' player and most improved player in his first full season.

After 78 league appearances in three seasons, Wilson was taken on loan in March 2006 by Preston North End, then signed up at the end of the season for a fee of £350,000. He started 16 games in the 2006–07 season. During his time at Preston he scored in the league against Stoke City and in the FA Cup against Crystal Palace.

=== Nottingham Forest ===
In July 2007, Wilson signed for Nottingham Forest for £300,000, committing him to a four-year deal with his home town club. In the 2007–08 campaign, Wilson was a virtual ever-present in defence, as he helped Forest gain automatic promotion to the Championship after finishing second in League One. He made 42 appearances, missing a few games due to a red card in Forest's 2–1 victory over Huddersfield Town and an injury towards the end of the season. Wilson helped Forest amass a total of 24 clean sheets in his first season at the club which was a league record.

In 2009, Wilson could not reproduce his League One form at Championship standard, with the season ending in a relegation battle. On 13 April 2009, a red card for a head butt on Sheffield United's Greg Halford saw Wilson's season finish under a black cloud.

Wilson missed the first month of the 2009–10 season through injury. On his return from injury he helped Nottingham Forest reach the Championship play-offs in May 2010, where they lost to Blackpool at the semi-final stage. It was around this time that Scottish Premier League side Celtic were first linked with an interest in signing Wilson. Wilson remained at Forest for the following season and played in 10 of their league games up to January 2011. By this time Celtic had renewed their interest in Wilson, and on 7 January 2011 he signed a pre-contract agreement to join Celtic in the summer of 2011. Nottingham Forest manager Billy Davies thereafter did not play Wilson in any game for the remainder of his time at the City Ground, although Wilson denied there was any rift between the two.

=== Celtic ===
==== 2011–12 ====
Having signed a pre-contract agreement with Celtic on 7 January 2011, Wilson officially joined the club on 1 July 2011. Celtic manager Neil Lennon had played alongside Wilson during Lennon's brief spell at Forest in 2007. Lennon said about Wilson, "I like him a lot. I played with him for six months when I was at Forest. He was 22 then and still developing physically. We have watched him for the last couple of years and he has been very consistent in the Championship", adding "He's very quick, composed on the ball and decent in the air as well".

Wilson made his debut for Celtic in their opening match of the 2011–12 Scottish Premier League, a 2–0 win over Hibernian. He gave a strong performance, making two crucial interventions which denied Hibs goalscoring opportunities and kept Celtic's 1–0 lead intact. He played in Celtic's next two matches as they beat Aberdeen 1–0, then Dundee United 5–1. He was due to start in Celtic's first European match of the season against FC Sion on 13 August, but picked up a leg injury in the build-up to the match, which ended 0–0. This injury kept him out of Celtic's next two matches, both of which ended in defeat. He made his return on 28 August in a 2–0 win over St Mirren. He then made his European debut in a 2–0 loss to Atlético Madrid at the Vicente Calderón. On 18 September Wilson played in Celtic's 4–2 defeat against Old Firm rivals Rangers and was responsible for the first goal. His poor clearance allowed Steven Naismith to put Rangers in the lead. His next game for Celtic was against Ross County in the Scottish League Cup. Celtic won 2–0 but Wilson had to come off at half-time. Celtic later discovered that he had suffered an achilles tear and would be out for between eight and ten weeks.

==== 2012–13 ====
After a lacklustre first season, Wilson put in an improved performance in the second leg of Celtic's UEFA Champions League play-off against Helsingborgs IF. Many Celtic fans have identified this game as the turning point of Wilson's Celtic career. His good European form continued into the SPL, solidifying his place within the Celtic starting eleven once again.

On 23 October 2012, Wilson put in one of the finest performances of his career, shutting out Lionel Messi in Celtic's narrow 2–1 defeat to Barcelona at the Camp Nou. He also excelled in the reverse fixture at Celtic Park, helping Celtic to a 2–1 win over Barcelona, and subsequently helped Celtic to qualify for the last 16 of the UEFA Champions League.

During the summer Wilson expressed a desire to return south to England for family reasons, with former club Nottingham Forest making public in July their interest in re-signing him. On 8 August 2013, Celtic manager Neil Lennon confirmed that Wilson would return to former club Nottingham Forest.

=== Return to Nottingham Forest ===
On 9 August 2013, Wilson re-signed for Nottingham Forest for a fee of £2.5 million. However, Wilson injured his ankle in training a few weeks later. Wilson made a handful of appearances after that but then required to undergo surgery to his back in November 2013, and did not play any games between 19 October 2013 and 5 April 2014.

Having missed the beginning of the 2014–15 season, Wilson played the full ninety minutes for Nottingham Forest's under 21s on 26 August 2014 against Sheffield Wednesday's under 21s. He played a further 65 minutes for them on 2 September 2014 to step up his recovery. Wilson eventually made his first appearance of the 2014–15 season on 17 September 2014, coming off the bench in the 56th minute of a 5–3 victory over Fulham. Wilson started Forest's next game against Millwall at The Den on 20 September 2014, partnering Michael Mancienne at central defence in a 0–0 draw.

During a league match at Derby County on 17 January 2015, Wilson was attacked by an angry Derby fan after the final whistle of their 2–1 win. Forest teammate Jamaal Lascelles brought the attacker down with a rugby tackle before stewards took over and dragged the supporter away and handed him over to police officers.

=== Rotherham United ===
Wilson signed for Rotherham United on a one-year deal on 2 August 2016.

== Coaching career ==
In June 2020, Wilson joined non-league club Ilkeston Town in a player-coach role, following a three-year break from football.

== Career statistics ==
As of 9 May 2016

Appearances and goals by club, season and competition
Club	Season	League			FA Cup		League Cup		Other		Total	
Club	Season	Division	Apps	Goals	Apps	Goals	Apps	Goals	Apps	Goals	Apps	Goals
Notts County	2003–04	Division Two	3	0	0	0	0	0	0	0	3	0
Notts County	2004–05	League Two	41	2	4	0	2	1	1 (Note: Appearance(s) in Football League Trophy)	0	48	3
Notts County	2005–06	League Two	34	1	1	0	1	0	1	0	37	1
Notts County	Total		78	3	5	0	3	1	2	0	88	4
Preston North End	2005–06	Championship	6	0	—		—		—		6	0
Preston North End	2006–07	Championship	21	1	2	1	1	0	—		24	2
Preston North End	Total		27	1	2	1	1	0	—		30	2
Nottingham Forest	2007–08	League One	42	0	3	0	2	0	0	0	47	0
Nottingham Forest	2008–09	Championship	36	0	3	0	0	0	—		39	0
Nottingham Forest	2009–10	Championship	35	0	0	0	1	0	2 (Note: Appearance(s) in Football League play-offs)	0	38	0
Nottingham Forest	2010–11	Championship	10	0	0	0	0	0	0	0	10	0
Nottingham Forest	Total		123	0	6	0	3	0	2	0	134	0
Celtic	2011–12	Scottish Premier League	15	0	3	0	2	0	2 (Note: Appearance(s) in UEFA Europa League)	0	22	0
Celtic	2012–13	Scottish Premier League	32	0	5	0	3	0	10 (Note: Appearance(s) in UEFA Champions League)	0	50	0
Celtic	2013–14	Scottish Premiership	0	0	—		—		4	0	4	0
Celtic	Total		47	0	8	0	5	0	16	0	76	0
Nottingham Forest	2013–14	Championship	9	0	0	0	0	0	—		9	0
Nottingham Forest	2014–15	Championship	23	0	1	0	1	0	—		25	0
Nottingham Forest	2015–16	Championship	14	0	2	0	1	0	—		17	0
Nottingham Forest	Total		46	0	3	0	2	0	—		51	0
Rotherham United	2016–17	Championship	8	0	0	0	1	0	—		9	0
Career total			329	4	24	1	15	1	20	0	388	6

== Honours ==
Nottingham Forest

- Football League One runners-up: 2007–08

Celtic

- Scottish Premier League: 2011–12, 2012–13
- Scottish Cup: 2012–13
