= Paul Smith (footballer, born 1979) =

English footballer (born 1979)

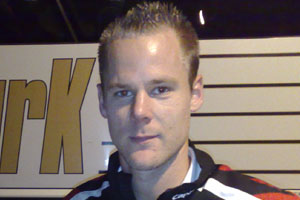
- Smith in 2007

Personal information
- Full name: Paul Daniel Smith
- Date of birth: 17 December 1979 (age 46)
- Place of birth: Epsom, England
- Height: 6 ft 4 in (1.93 m)
- Position: Goalkeeper

Team information
- Current team: Colchester United (academy goalkeeping coach)

Youth career
- 1997–1998: Walton & Hersham

Senior career*
Years	Team	Apps	(Gls)
1998	Epsom & Ewell	1	(0)
1998–1999	Charlton Athletic	0	(0)
1999–2000	Carshalton Athletic		
2000–2004	Brentford	87	(0)
2004–2006	Southampton	16	(0)
2006–2012	Nottingham Forest	120	(0)
2011	→ Middlesbrough (loan)	10	(0)
2012–2016	Southend United	34	(0)
Total		268	(0)
- * Club domestic league appearances and goals

Paul Daniel Smith (born 17 December 1979) is an English football coach and former player. He is currently head of Academy goalkeeper coaching at League Two club Colchester United.

== Education ==
Smith holds A-levels in PE, home economics, sociology, advanced mathematics, biology and geography. He studied at the Glyn School in Ewell, Epsom.

== Career ==
=== Early playing career ===
Smith was born in Epsom and made an appearance for his hometown club on the final day of the 1997–98 Isthmian League Third Division season. He continued his career at Charlton Athletic, but was released in the summer of 1999, after one year as a professional. After a short period with Walton & Hersham, Smith moved to Carshalton Athletic in late 1999, but moved to Brentford in August 2000 after they spotted Smith guesting for Crawley Town in a pre-season friendly against The Bees. At Brentford, he made 104 appearances.

=== Southampton ===
In January 2004, to address financial problems at Brentford, Smith was sold to Southampton for a fee reported to be £250,000, with additional add on fees totalling another £250,000. At Southampton, he was initially deputy to Antti Niemi, but, following Niemi's departure, Smith took over as their number one. However, he found himself further down the pecking order with the arrival of Bartosz Białkowski and Kevin Miller.

=== Nottingham Forest ===
In search of first team football, Smith signed for League One side Nottingham Forest for around £500,000 in July 2006. He established himself ahead of Rune Pedersen as Forest's first choice goalkeeper for the club's 2006–07 promotion campaign.

In the 2007–08 campaign, Smith helped Forest gain automatic promotion finishing second in the league they were promoted from League One to the Championship. Smith had a good season and helped enormously in goal, making match winning saves to help the Reds gain promotion. He kept 24 clean sheets in 46 games, the record for the championship league in that season. This achievement was recognised when he received the Puma Golden Glove award.

He also made footballing history in the Football League Cup when he scored after 15 seconds against Leicester City in the second round of the competition on 18 September 2007. Smith became the quickest goalkeeper ever to score in world football, and the quickest ever goalscorer in the League Cup and for Nottingham Forest. The unusual goal came about because the tie had been previously abandoned at half-time due to the collapse of Leicester City's Clive Clarke, while Nottingham Forest were 1–0 up. In a show of sportsmanship, Leicester allowed Forest to take the kick-off and run up uncontested to score the goal, to restore the scoreline to what it was at the abandonment of the previous match. It was decided that Smith should be the player to score, to avoid suspicions surrounding betting patterns. Leicester City did come back into the game to beat Forest 3–2. In July 2008, Smith signed a new two-year contract with Forest, keeping him at the City Ground until 2010, and signed another extension in 2009, to keep Smith at the City Ground until 2012.

After falling out of favour with manager Billy Davies, Smith lost his first choice status to Lee Camp, despite having played in all three of their League Cup matches. On 30 July 2010, Smith was placed on the transfer list and told he was free to seek first team football elsewhere. This was two days after a pre-season friendly at the City Ground against French Ligue 1 team Olympique Lyonnais which Forest lost 3–1. Smith was replaced by youngster Karl Darlow in the 75th minute, and Smith's performance was criticised.

In the 2011–12 season, Smith was restricted to one first team game, a Football League Cup at home to neighbours Notts County which ended in a 3–3 draw, Forest winning the penalty shoot-out.

Smith's contract expired with Forest at the end of the 2011–12 season and he was released by the club.

=== Middlesbrough (loan) ===
On 8 March 2011, Smith joined Middlesbrough on loan until the end of the season; he made his debut that night in a 2–1 win against Derby County. He played in 10 first team games.

=== Southend United ===
On 18 August 2012, Smith signed a two-year deal with Southend United.

=== Colchester United ===
On 6 July 2017, Smith joined Colchester United as head of academy goalkeeper coaching.

== Career statistics ==
Appearances and goals by club, season and competition
Club	Season	League			FA Cup		League Cup		Other		Total	
Club	Season	Division	Apps	Goals	Apps	Goals	Apps	Goals	Apps	Goals	Apps	Goals
Epsom & Ewell	1997–98	Isthmian League Third Division	1	0	―		―		―		1	0
Brentford	2000–01	Second Division	2	0	0	0	0	0	1 (Note: Appearance in Football League Trophy)	0	3	0
Brentford	2001–02	Second Division	18	0	0	0	0	0	4 (Note: Three appearances in Second Division play-offs, one appearance in Football League Trophy)	0	22	0
Brentford	2002–03	Second Division	43	0	4	0	2	0	2	0	51	0
Brentford	2003–04	Second Division	24	0	2	0	1	0	2	0	29	0
Brentford	Total		87	0	6	0	3	0	9	0	105	0
Southampton	2003–04	Premier League	0	0	―		―		―		0	0
Southampton	2004–05	Premier League	6	0	3	0	0	0	0	0	9	0
Southampton	2005–06	Championship	10	0	1	0	2	0	0	0	13	0
Southampton	Total		16	0	4	0	2	0	0	0	22	0
Nottingham Forest	2006–07	League One	45	0	4	0	1	0	2 (Note: Appearances in League One play-offs)	0	52	0
Nottingham Forest	2007–08	League One	46	0	3	0	2	1	1	0	52	1
Nottingham Forest	2008–09	Championship	28	0	3	0	2	0	―		33	0
Nottingham Forest	2009–10	Championship	1	0	0	0	3	0	0	0	4	0
Nottingham Forest	2010–11	Championship	0	0	0	0	0	0	0	0	0	0
Nottingham Forest	2011–12	Championship	0	0	0	0	1	0	―		1	0
Nottingham Forest	Total		120	0	10	0	9	1	3	0	142	1
Middlesbrough (loan)	2010–11	Championship	10	0	―		―		―		10	0
Southend United	2012–13	League Two	34	0	4	0	0	0	7	0	45	0
Southend United	2013–14	League Two	0	0	0	0	0	0	1	0	1	0
Southend United	2014–15	League Two	0	0	0	0	1	0	0	0	1	0
Southend United	2015–16	League One	0	0	0	0	0	0	0	0	0	0
Southend United	Total		34	0	4	0	1	0	8	0	47	0
Career total			268	0	24	0	15	1	20	0	327	1

== Honours ==
Brentford

- Football League Trophy runner-up: 2000–01

Nottingham Forest

- Football League One second-place promotion: 2007–08

Southend United

- Football League Trophy runner-up: 2012–13
