= Adam Newbold =

English footballer (born 1989)

Personal information
- Date of birth: 16 November 1989 (age 36)
- Place of birth: England
- Height: 6 ft 1 in (1.85 m)
- Position: Striker

Youth career
- ?–2008: Nottingham Forest

Senior career*
Years	Team	Apps	(Gls)
2008–2009	Nottingham Forest	4	(1)
2009	→ Stalybridge Celtic (loan)	6	(5)
2009–2010	Tamworth	0	(0)
2010	Hucknall Town	0	(0)
2011	Ballarat Red Devils	15	(18)
- * Club domestic league appearances and goals as of 14:57, 4 August 2010 (UTC)

Adam Newbold (born 16 November 1989) is an English footballer who plays as a striker. In December 2010, it was announced that he had agreed a deal to sign for Australian side Ballarat Red Devils. He made his debut for the club in February.

== Career ==
Newbold scored on his debut for Nottingham Forest after coming on as a 75th minute substitute against Morecambe in the League Cup on 13 August 2008, which finished as a 4–0 victory. His Football League debut came three days later in a 3–1 defeat to Swansea City in the Championship by making a substitute appearance on 87 minutes. In November 2008, Newbold signed a new one-and-a-half-year contract at the City Ground, with the option of a one-year extension.

Following the dismissal of Forest boss Colin Calderwood, and the subsequent appointment of Billy Davies, Newbold joined Conference North club Stalybridge Celtic on loan until the end of the 2008–09 season on 26 March 2009. He made his debut two days later, scoring a goal in the process, only for it to ruled out by the linesman who adjudged him to be offside. He finished the loan with six appearances, scoring an impressive 5 goals. His contract was mutually terminated by Forest after the club's reserve team was disbanded by the new management team, leaving many of the club's talented young players without a club.

In December 2009, he signed for Tamworth of the Conference National on non-contract terms, following a brief spell in Scotland. After it was revealed the club was under financial difficulties, Newbold left Tamworth and signed for Hucknall Town F.C., despite being thought to be the transfer target for a number of league clubs. Newbold left Hucknall without making a single appearance for the club after deciding that he would look to get back into the professional game.

In February/March 2011 Newbold joined the Ballarat Red Devils on non-contract terms. It took Newbold just 26 minutes of his debut for the Red Devils and Australian soccer to find the back of the net. He was on target during a 5–1 romp over Langwarrin, where he was named man of the match and hailed by local newspaper Silobreaker as a standout.
