= Robert Hughes (footballer) =

English footballer

Personal information
- Date of birth: 1 October 1986 (age 40)
- Place of birth: England
- Position: Midfielder

Team information
- Current team: St Neots Town

Youth career
- –: Nottingham Forest

Senior career*
Years	Team	Apps	(Gls)
2006–2007	Nottingham Forest	2	(0)
2007–2008	Stamford		
2008	Corby Town		
2008–2009	Spalding United		
2009	Grantham Town		
2009–2010	St Neots Town		
- * Club domestic league appearances and goals as of 17:46, 25 November 2009 (UTC)

Robert Hughes (born 1 October 1986) is an English footballer who played in the Football League as a central midfielder for Nottingham Forest. He joined St Neots Town in September 2009.

Hughes began his career with Nottingham Forest and after several appearances in the reserves, made his Forest debut on 30 September 2006 as an 84th-minute substitute in a 3–1 win over Swansea City. He later made his full debut in the 2–1 Football League Trophy win over Gillingham. However, he was released at the end of the 2006–07 season, He then signed for Stamford, going on to play for clubs including Corby Town, Spalding United, Grantham Town, and St Neots Town.
