= Julian Bennett (footballer) =

English footballer

Personal information
- Full name: Julian Llewelyn Bennett
- Date of birth: 17 December 1984 (age 41)
- Place of birth: Nottingham, England
- Position: Left back

Youth career
- 1993–1996: Nottingham Forest
- 1998–1999: Scunthorpe United
- 1999–2004: Walsall

Senior career*
Years	Team	Apps	(Gls)
2004–2006	Walsall	51	(3)
2006–2011	Nottingham Forest	95	(8)
2010–2011	→ Crystal Palace (loan)	13	(1)
2011–2013	Sheffield Wednesday	21	(2)
2012	→ Shrewsbury Town (loan)	4	(0)
2013–2014	Southend United	0	(0)
Total		184	(14)
- * Club domestic league appearances and goals

Julian Llewelyn Bennett (born 17 December 1984) is an English retired footballer, who played as a defender, having spent his career at Walsall, Nottingham Forest, Sheffield Wednesday before finishing his career at Southend United.

== Career ==
=== Youth and Walsall ===
Bennett was a youth player at Nottingham Forest's Centre of Excellence but left when he was 14 years old to play for local teams in the Nottingham area. However, he soon joined Walsall as a YTS player He progressed through the youth and reserve sides at Walsall and made his Walsall debut on 28 February 2004, where he came on as a substitute for Matt Carbon in the 70th minute, in a 1–0 loss against Wigan Athletic., which turns out to be only appearance of the 2003–04 season.

After signing his first professional contract with the club, Bennett eventually became a regular first-team player there in the 2004–05 season. During the 2004–05 season, he scored two goals during the season against Colchester United and Wrexham. The 2005–06 season saw Bennett managed to remain in the first team in the defence until he received a straight red card for a reckless tackle on Dani Rodrigues, in a 0–0 draw against AFC Bournemouth. Bennett's disciplinary issues was criticised by then Manager Paul Merson. After serving a three match suspension, Bennett scored his first goal of the season one week later on 8 October 2005, in a 1–1 draw against Milton Keynes Dons.

He made a total of over 50 appearances for Walsall, playing at centre-back and left-back

=== Nottingham Forest ===
On 10 January 2006, Bennett signed for his home town club of Nottingham Forest in a two-and-a-half-year deal for an undisclosed fee. He said, "Lots of other teams, including ones in the Championship, were showing interest in me, but this is my home-town club and it's a dream come true".

Four days later on 14 January 2006, Bennett made his Nottingham Forest debut, where he played 90 minutes, in a 3–0 win over Oldham Athletic. However, in the next game on 17 January 2006, Bennett received a red card after a second bookable offence in a 1–1 draw against Brentford. After a serving three match suspension, Bennett scored his first Nottingham Forest goal on his return when he scored the last minutes in a 2–2 draw against Blackpool on 4 February 2006 and scored again in the last game of the season, in a 1–1 draw against Bradford City.

Bennett started the 2006–07 season well when he scored in the opening game of the season, in a 1–0 win over Bradford City. Bennett then scored his second goal of the season, which turns out to be the only goal of the game, in a 1–0 win over Northampton Town on 10 February 2007. Manager Colin Calderwood did not play Bennett regularly earlier in the 2006–07 season, however he eventually established himself as Forest's first-choice left full-back.

In the 2007–08 season, the signing of the experienced Matt Lockwood put Bennett's chances to maintain his place under pressure. However, injury to Lockwood gave him an opportunity. He scored his first goal of the season in Forest's 2–1 defeat at Luton Town. He received praise from Calderwood after assisting both of Forest's goals in a 2–0 win against Tranmere Rovers, who admitted it would be difficult to take him out of the team despite Lockwood nearing a return. He then had an injury in late November 2007 that kept him sidelined him until the new year. On 14 January 2008, Bennett signed a new 2 1/2-year contract, committing him to the club until the summer of 2010 On return to fitness, he managed to dislodge Matt Lockwood from the starting line-up and continued in the same vein of form. He made a total of 33 league starts in the 2007–08 season, scoring 4 goals. He netted two goals in two games in February 2008, against Millwall and Leeds United, and made a goal-line clearance at Elland Road. He also scored in the final game of the season, the first goal in Forest's 3–2 victory over Yeovil Town at the City Ground, which saw Forest finish second in League One in a dramatic last day of the season, thereby gaining promotion to the Championship. Bennett was voted Forest's Player of the Year for the promotion 2007–08 season. 'Jules' had helped the team keep 24 clean sheets that season, a league record. His performances were also recognised when he was named in the PFA's League One team of the year along with Forest teammate Kris Commons. However, having established himself as first choice left-back at Forest and become a fan favourite – owing to his consistent form, local credentials and no-nonsense playing style – the rest of his career at the City Ground was ravaged by injury.

The 2008–09 season was one to forget for Bennett. Bennett appeared in the first four matches at the start of the season until he suffered a calf injury and after being sidelined for two matches, Bennett made his first team return on 20 September 2008, in a 0–0 draw against Charlton Athletic. His return was short-lived when on 21 October 2008 he injured his collarbone which kept him out of action for six weeks. Then, soon after his return, in December 2008 he sustained a serious knee injury (cruciate and cartilage ligaments) in the Boxing Day 4–2 home defeat to Doncaster Rovers. This ruled him out for the rest of the season. While recovering from a major knee operation, Bennett was nominated for the PFA Player in the Community, but lost out to Graeme Murty.

Recovering from a major knee operation, Bennett commenced rehab in summer 2009 and full training in January 2010. After an extensive 14-month injury lay-off, he returned in a behind-closed-doors friendly in March 2010 at Forest's training ground in which he played 45 minutes. Shortly afterwards Bennett signed a contract extension keeping him at Forest until summer 2011. He did not play for the Forest first team for the entirety of the 2009–10 season, but he did make a minor public comeback at the final home match when he warmed up on the pitch with his teammates before the game.

In July 2010 Bennett played in three pre-season friendly fixtures. However, on 5 August Forest signed left-back Ryan Bertrand from Chelsea on loan for six months; and Bennett was informed by the club that he would be sent out on loan in order to regain his fitness. It was announced on 6 August 2010 that Bennett was allowed go on loan to Crystal Palace, thus giving him the chance to demonstrate his match fitness and form through the improved opportunity of regular first team action. He returned to Forest on 5 January 2011 but was not allowed to go out on loan again due to the loss of loanee Ryan Bertrand . Nevertheless, during the rest of the season Bennett failed to achieve a start for Forest: his opportunities being severely reduced partly due to the signing by Forest of the experienced Paul Konchesky on 31 January 2011 in a 93-day emergency loan deal, but also because of manager Billy Davies' preference for other players as cover at left-back. Bennett made three appearances as substitute for Forest in the latter part of the 2010–11 season.

Bennett became a free agent in July 2011. He made a total of over 100 appearances for Forest. His final starting appearance in a competitive match for the club had transpired to be the one in which he had seriously injured his knee on 26 December 2008. Although Forest indicated they were prepared to offer Bennett a one-year contract should he be unable to find another club (in recognition of the community work he had undertaken during his time recovering from injury), he subsequently signed for League One side Sheffield Wednesday.

=== Crystal Palace (loan) ===
At the beginning of the 2010–11 season Bennett joined Crystal Palace on loan in a six-month deal. He made 14 appearances for Palace, scoring one goal which came in a 2–1 win over Norwich City on 19 October 2010. His loan spell ended in January 2011.

=== Sheffield Wednesday ===
On 5 July 2011, Bennett signed a two-year contract with League One club Sheffield Wednesday. This saw him reunited with Wednesday manager Gary Megson who had signed him for Nottingham Forest five years previously. The reunion was short lived however, as Megson was sacked less than 8 months later.

Bennett made his Sheffield Wednesday debut, in the opening game of the season, where he set up a goal for Rob Jones to score a header, in a 2–0 win over Rochdale. After the match, Bennett was praised by Megson for playing a role to assisting Rob Jones' goal. Two weeks later on 20 August 2011, Bennett scored his first Sheffield Wednesday goal, in a 2–1 win over Notts County. Seven days later on 27 August 2011, Bennett set up a second goal for Ben Marshall, in a 3–2 win over Scunthorpe United. After suffering a hamstring injury, Bennett scored two weeks after his return, in a 2–2 draw against Yeovil Town] in which, Bennett found himself competing in the left–back position with Mark Reynolds and Réda Johnson. However, during the season, Bennett suffered a concussion and another injury that kept him out for the remainder of the season. Despite this, Bennett finished the season, making twenty-one appearances and scoring once.

Since the departure of former manager Gary Megson, Bennett struggled to make an appearance in the first team. Ahead of the 2012–13 season, Bennett was told by Manager Dave Jones. In October 2012, an out of favour Bennett was loaned out to League One side Shrewsbury Town. He made his Shrews debut against Bournemouth on 6 November 2012, which saw Shrewsbury Town lose 2– 1. After making four appearances, it was announced on 29 November 2012, his loan was cut short due to a back injury, and he returned to his parent club. Following this, Bennett never played again and at the end of the 2012–13 season, he was not offered a new deal as manager Dave Jones began his clear-out and his contract was about to expire.

=== Southend United ===
Bennett joined Southend United on 1 August 2013, whilst Southend United were under a transfer embargo due to the unpaid wages of some players and staff at the club.

Bennett made his debut for Southend United against Yeovil Town in the League Cup, where he made his first starts in years. However, during the match, Bennett suffered a serious knee injury and was side-lined for six months. With just one appearance, Bennett never played for Southend United again and in February, Bennett suffered another injury setback when he injured cruciate ligament. With his contract expiring at the end of the 2013–14 season, Bennett was considering his future at the club when they offered him a pay as you play deal. However, Manager Phil Brown said Bennett won't be staying at the club.

After a year out of football, Bennett announced his retirement from football on 29 June 2015, having failed to recover from his knee injury. Weeks after announcing his retirement, Bennett went on trial at Boston United to fill in the left–back spot With Bennett's move to Boston United appear to happen, the move, however, was broken down.

== Personal life ==
While growing up in Nottingham, England, Bennett attended Welbeck Primary School.

== Honours ==
Individual

- PFA Team of the Year: 2007–08 League One
- Nottingham Forest Player of the Year: 2007–08
