= Matt Thornhill =

English footballer

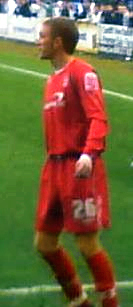
- Thornhill playing for Nottingham Forest

Personal information
- Full name: Matthew Mark Thornhill
- Date of birth: 11 October 1988 (age 38)
- Place of birth: Nottingham, England
- Position: Attacking midfielder

Team information
- Current team: Ilkeston Town

Youth career
- Nottingham Forest

Senior career*
Years	Team	Apps	(Gls)
2006–2011	Nottingham Forest	38	(5)
2009	→ Brighton & Hove Albion (loan)	7	(0)
2010	→ Cheltenham Town (loan)	17	(3)
2011–2012	Hibernian	14	(0)
2012–2014	Buxton	27	(7)
2014–2016	Shaw Lane Aquaforce		
2016–2017	Gainsborough Trinity	5	(1)
2017–2025	Basford United		
2025–	Ilkeston Town	0	(0)
- * Club domestic league appearances and goals as of 15:12, 19 May 2025 (UTC)

Matthew Mark Thornhill (born 11 October 1988) is an English footballer who plays for Northern Premier League Premier Division club Ilkeston Town. He has previously played for Nottingham Forest, Brighton & Hove Albion, Cheltenham Town, Hibernian, Buxton, Shaw Lane Aquaforce and Gainsborough Trinity. His career has been disrupted by a medial knee ligament injury.

== Career ==
=== Nottingham Forest ===
Thornhill made his professional debut for Nottingham Forest as a substitute at Chester City in the first round of the League Cup, which Forest won 4–2 on penalties after the game finished goalless after normal and extra time. He made his League debut five days later, coming on as a second-half substitute for Kris Commons against Swansea City. On 12 January 2008, the youngster came on as a late substitute against Leyton Orient to score his first professional goal for The Reds, the last of Forest's goals in a 4–0 victory.

Thornhill started his first Forest game when he stepped in at the last minute to replace Chris Cohen in the heart of midfield. He scored his second goal of the season in a 1–1 draw at Southend. He helped The Reds finish second in the 2007–08 season in League One, gaining promotion to the Championship. With The Reds gaining promotion, manager Colin Calderwood commented that Thornhill would be given the chance to impress the following season.

On 21 July 2009, Thornhill joined League One side Brighton & Hove Albion on loan as part of the transfer deal which saw Joel Lynch join Nottingham Forest. After making seven appearances for Brighton, Thornhill returned to Nottingham Forest in December. Thornhill then joined League Two side Cheltenham Town on a one-month loan deal in January 2010. His debut for Cheltenham came against Rochdale, and shortly after that his loan deal was extended to the end of the season.

Thornhill was released by Forest in January 2011, with manager Billy Davies alluding to "good young players here who need to move on; who need to go and have a fresh start".

=== Hibernian ===
On 21 January 2011, Thornhill agreed a deal to sign for Scottish Premier League club Hibernian until the summer of 2013, subject to a medical. Hibernian confirmed the transfer a few days later, assigning the player squad number 26. His 2010–11 season was ended prematurely by a medial knee ligament injury. Thornhill was released from his contract in January 2012. He had made just 15 appearances for Hibs in his year with the club.

=== Into the National League System ===
Thornhill signed for Northern Premier League club Buxton in November 2012.

He signed for Shaw Lane Aquaforce, then of the Northern Counties East Football League, in July 2014. He won promotion with the team to the Northern Premier League Division One South at the end of the 2014–15 season. Thornhill was club captain at Aquaforce the following season as they reached the play-off final, which the Barnsley club lost to Coalville Town.

On 6 June 2016 Thornhill signed a one-year contract with National League North side Gainsborough Trinity.

On 11 March 2017 Thornhill signed for Northern Premier League side Basford United.

In May 2025, Thornhill joined Northern Premier League Premier Division side Ilkeston Town.

== Career statistics ==
Club performance			League		Cup		League Cup		Total	
Season	Club	League	Apps	Goals	Apps	Goals	Apps	Goals	Apps	Goals
England			League		FA Cup		League Cup		Total	
2007–08	Nottingham Forest	League One	14	2	1	0	1	0	16	2
2008–09	Nottingham Forest	Championship	24	3	2	0	2	0	28	3
2009–10	Brighton & Hove Albion (loan)	League One	7	0	0	0	1	0	8	0
2009–10	Cheltenham Town (loan)	League Two	17	3	0	0	0	0	17	3
2010–11	Nottingham Forest	Championship	0	0	0	0	1	1	1	1
Total	England		62	8	3	0	5	1	70	9
Scotland			League		Scottish Cup		League Cup		Total	
2010–11	Hibernian	SPL	8	0	0	0	0	0	8	0
2011–12	Hibernian	SPL	6	0	0	0	1	0	7	0
Total	Scotland		14	0	0	0	1	0	15	0
Career total			76	8	3	0	6	1	85	9

== Honours ==
Nottingham Forest

- League One Runner-up: 2008
