= Shane Redmond =

Irish footballer and Gaelic footballer

Personal information
- Full name: Shane Patrick Redmond
- Date of birth: 23 March 1989 (age 37)
- Place of birth: Dublin, Ireland
- Height: 6 ft 2 in (1.88 m)
- Position: Goalkeeper

Youth career
- Rathcoole Boys
- Cherry Orchard
- 2006–2008: Nottingham Forest

Senior career*
| Years | Team | Apps | (Gls) |
| 2008–2010 | Nottingham Forest | 0 | (0) |
| 2008–2009 | → Eastwood Town (loan) | 24 | (0) |
| 2009–2010 | → Burton Albion (loan) | 3 | (0) |
| 2010 | → Darlington (loan) | 19 | (0) |
| 2010–2011 | Chesterfield | 0 | (0) |
| 2011–2013 | Mansfield Town | 7 | (0) |
| 2013–2014 | Bray Wanderers | 8 | (0) |
| Total | | 61 | (0) |

International career
| 2008–2010 | Republic of Ireland U21 | 21 | (0) |
- * Club domestic league appearances and goals

Shane Patrick Redmond (born 23 March 1989) is an Irish footballer who played as a goalkeeper. He now plays Gaelic football with St Mary's, Saggart in the Dublin Senior Football Championship.

== Career ==
Born in Dublin, Redmond began his career with Rathcoole Boys before moving to famed Dublin schoolboy club Cherry Orchard.

== Nottingham Forest ==
Redmond signed for Nottingham Forest from Cherry Orchard in July 2006. In November 2008 he joined Eastwood Town on loan. He spent five months on loan with the eventual Northern Premier League Premier Division winners, making a total of 31 appearances: 24 in the league and seven in Eastwood's successful FA Cup run. Redmond was recalled by Forest on 6 April 2009 as cover for Paul Smith.

=== Burton Albion ===
On 6 July 2009, Forest agreed to loan the Republic of Ireland under-21 keeper to Burton Albion until January, with the possibility of a season-long agreement. After his first game for Burton Albion, in which they suffered a 3–1 defeat against Shrewsbury Town, he was replaced by his fellow on-loan goalkeeper Artur Krysiak.

=== Darlington ===
Redmond returned to Forest in January 2010, but was soon loaned out again to League Two strugglers Darlington. He made his full league debut against Northampton Town which ended in a 2–1 defeat for his new club.

=== Chesterfield ===
Redmond was among a number of players released by Forest at the end of the 2009–10 season. On 4 August 2010, he signed for League Two side Chesterfield on a monthly contract after a successful pre-season trial with the club. Despite not playing in a single match for the Spireites, Redmond was reserve goalkeeper on a regular basis he was able to gain a Football League Two winners medal. Redmond was released by Chesterfield at the end of the 2010–11 season as his contract had expired.

=== Mansfield Town ===
On 1 July 2011, Redmond was announced as Mansfield Town's latest signing. He was released by Mansfield at the end of the 2012–13 season.

=== Bray Wanderers ===
In July 2013, Redmond signed for League of Ireland Premier Division club Bray Wanderers. He was largely understudy to first choice goalkeeper Darren Quigley in the Carlisle Grounds.

== International ==
Redmond has been capped 21 times by the Republic of Ireland at U21 level, a record number of appearances.

== Gaelic football ==
After finishing playing professional football, Redmond returned to Gaelic football with St. Mary's, Saggart in the Dublin Senior Football Championship.
