= 2013–14 Nottingham Forest F.C. season =

English football club season

Nottingham Forest
2013–14 season
- Chairman: Fawaz Al-Hasawi
- Manager: Billy Davies (until 24 March); Gary Brazil (caretaker charge from 24 March to 3 May)
- Ground: City Ground
- Championship: 11th
- FA Cup: Fifth round
- League Cup: Third round
- Top goalscorer: League: Andy Reid (9); All: Jamie Paterson (12)
- Highest home attendance: 28,276 (28 Sep. vs Derby County)
- Lowest home attendance: 17,951 (25 Mar. vs Charlton Athletic)
Home colours	Away colours

The 2013–14 season was Nottingham Forest Football Club's sixth consecutive season in the Championship since promotion in 2007–08. This page covers the period 1 July 2013 to 30 June 2014.

== First team squad ==
As of 3 May 2014

No.	Player	Nationality	Date of birth (age)	Signed from	Year signed	Year contract expires
Goalkeepers
1	Karl Darlow	(England)	8 October 1990 (aged 23)	Academy	2011	2017
26	Dimitar Evtimov	(Bulgaria)	7 September 1993 (aged 20)	(Bulgaria) Chavdar Etropole	2011	2015
29	Dorus de Vries	(Netherlands)	29 December 1980 (aged 33)	(England) Wolverhampton Wanderers	2013	2015
Defenders
2	Eric Lichaj	(United States)	17 November 1988 (aged 25)	(England) Aston Villa	2013	2016
3	Dan Harding	(England)	23 December 1983 (aged 30)	(England) Southampton	2012	2015
5	Danny Collins	(Wales)	6 August 1980 (aged 33)	(England) Stoke City	2012	2015
13	Danny Fox	(Scotland)	29 May 1986 (aged 28)	(England) Southampton	2014	2017
15	Greg Halford	(England)	8 December 1984 (aged 29)	(England) Portsmouth	2012	2015
16	Jamaal Lascelles	(England)	11 November 1993 (aged 20)	Academy	2012	2018
18	Gonzalo Jara	(Chile)	29 August 1985 (aged 28)	(England) West Bromwich Albion	2013	2014
22	Kelvin Wilson	(England)	3 September 1985 (aged 28)	(Scotland) Celtic	2013	2016
25	Jack Hobbs	(England)	18 August 1988 (aged 25)	(England) Hull City	2014	2018
32	Kévin Gomis	(France)	20 January 1989 (aged 25)	(France) Nice	2014	2014
37	Lee Peltier	(England)	11 December 1986 (aged 27)	(England) Leeds United	2014	2014
Midfielders
6	Guy Moussi	(France)	23 January 1985 (aged 29)	(France) Angers	2008	2014
8	Chris Cohen (c)	(England)	5 March 1987 (aged 27)	(England) Yeovil Town	2007	2015
10	Henri Lansbury	(England)	12 October 1990 (aged 23)	(England) Arsenal	2012	2015
11	Andy Reid (vc)	(Republic of Ireland)	29 July 1982 (aged 31)	(England) Blackpool	2011	2016
13	Jonathan Greening	(England)	2 January 1979 (aged 35)	(England) Fulham	2011	2014
24	David Vaughan	(Wales)	18 February 1983 (aged 31)	(England) Sunderland	2014	2014
28	Radoslaw Majewski	(Poland)	15 December 1986 (aged 27)	(Poland) Polonia Warsaw	2009	2016
30	Stephen McLaughlin	(Republic of Ireland)	14 June 1990 (aged 24)	(Republic of Ireland) Derry City	2013	2016
33	David Morgan	(Northern Ireland)	4 July 1994 (aged 19)	Academy	2012	2014
36	Josh Rees	(England)	4 October 1993 (aged 20)	(England) Arsenal	2013	2016
38	Ben Osborn	(England)	5 August 1994 (aged 19)	Academy	2012	2019
39	Djamel Abdoun	(Algeria)	14 February 1986 (aged 28)	(Greece) Olympiacos	2013	2016
40	Jack Blake	(Scotland)	22 September 1994 (aged 19)	Academy	2012	2014
Forwards
9	Darius Henderson	(England)	7 September 1981 (aged 32)	(England) Millwall	2013	2015
12	Jamie Mackie	(Scotland)	21 August 1985 (aged 28)	(England) Queens Park Rangers	2013	2016
19	Rafik Djebbour	(Algeria)	8 March 1984 (aged 30)	(Greece) Olympiacos	2014	2016
20	Marcus Tudgay	(England)	3 February 1983 (aged 31)	(England) Sheffield Wednesday	2011	2014
21	Jamie Paterson	(England)	20 December 1991 (aged 22)	(England) Walsall	2013	2018
23	Dexter Blackstock	(Antigua and Barbuda)	20 May 1986 (aged 28)	(England) Queens Park Rangers	2009	2017
27	Matt Derbyshire	(England)	14 April 1986 (aged 28)	(Greece) Olympiacos	2011	2014
31	Simon Cox	(Republic of Ireland)	28 April 1987 (aged 27)	(England) West Bromwich Albion	2012	2015
41	Tyler Walker	(England)	7 October 1996 (aged 17)	Academy	2014	2018

Source: Season Statistics – Nottingham Forest F.C.

== New contracts ==
Date	Position	Player	Extension	Contracted Until	Ref.
23 August 2013	GK	(England) Karl Darlow	4 Years	2017	
5 January 2014	MF	(Republic of Ireland) Andy Reid	2.5 Years	2016	
18 March 2014	DF	(England) Jamaal Lascelles	4.5 Years	2018	
18 March 2014	FW	(England) Jamie Paterson	4.5 years	2018	
29 April 2014	MF	(England) Ben Osborn	5 Years	2019	

== Player transfers ==
=== Transfers in ===
Date	Position	Player	From	Fee	Reference
2 July 2013	FW	(England) Jamie Paterson	(England) Walsall	Undisclosed	
3 July 2013	GK	(Netherlands) Dorus de Vries	(England) Wolverhampton Wanderers	Out of Contract	
25 July 2013	MF	(Algeria) Djamel Abdoun	(Greece) Olympiacos	Undisclosed	
26 July 2013	FW	(Scotland) Jamie Mackie	(England) Queens Park Rangers	Undisclosed	
9 August 2013	DF	(England) Kelvin Wilson	(Scotland) Celtic	Undisclosed	
29 January 2014	FW	(Algeria) Rafik Djebbour	(Greece) Olympiacos	Undisclosed	
31 January 2014	DF	(England) Jack Hobbs	(England) Hull City	Undisclosed	
9 May 2014	DF	(Scotland) Danny Fox	(England) Southampton	Free Transfer	
12 June 2014	FW	(Netherlands) Lars Veldwijk	(Netherlands) Excelsior	Undisclosed	

=== Loans in ===
Date from	Position	Player	From	Date until	Reference
16 July 2013	DF	(England) Jack Hobbs	(England) Hull City	24 January 2014	
19 September 2013	MF	(England) Nathaniel Chalobah	(England) Chelsea	15 January 2014	
31 October 2013	MF	(Wales) David Vaughan	(England) Sunderland	29 January 2014	
30 January 2014	DF	(Scotland) Danny Fox	(England) Southampton	30 June 2015	
30 January 2014	DF	(France) Kévin Gomis	(France) OGC Nice	30 June 2015	
31 January 2014	MF	(Wales) David Vaughan	(England) Sunderland	30 June 2014	
24 March 2014	DF	(England) Lee Peltier	(England) Leeds United	24 May 2014	

=== Transfers out ===
Date	Position	Player	To	Fee	Reference
2 July 2013	MF	(England) Lewis McGugan	Free Agent (Later joined Watford)	End of Contract	
4 July 2013	FW	(England) David McGoldrick	Free Agent (Later joined Ipswich Town)	End of Contract	
3 September 2013	MF	(Algeria) Adlène Guedioura	(England) Crystal Palace	Undisclosed	
15 January 2014	GK	(Kuwait) Khaled Al-Rashidi	Free Agent	Released	
27 May 2014	MF	(England) Simon Gillett	Free Agent (Later joined Yeovil Town)	End of Contract	
27 May 2014	MF	(France) Guy Moussi	Free Agent (Later joined Birmingham City)	End of Contract	
27 May 2014	MF	(England) Jonathan Greening	Free Agent (Later joined Tadcaster Albion)	End of Contract	
27 May 2014	FW	(England) Ishmael Miller	Free Agent (Later joined Blackpool)	End of Contract	
27 May 2014	DF	(Chile) Gonzalo Jara	Free Agent (Later joined Mainz 05)	End of Contract	
27 May 2014	FW	(England) Marcus Tudgay	Free Agent (Later joined Coventry City)	End of Contract	
27 May 2014	FW	(England) Matt Derbyshire	Free Agent (Later joined Rotherham United)	End of Contract	

=== Loans out ===
Date from	Position	Player	To	Date until	Reference
16 July 2013	GK	(Bulgaria) Dimitar Evtimov	(England) Nuneaton Town	17 October 2013	
2 September 2013	MF	(Republic of Ireland) Stephen McLaughlin	(England) Bristol City	2 January 2014	
19 October 2013	MF	(Scotland) Jack Blake	(England) Mansfield Town	19 November 2013	
24 October 2013	FW	(Antigua and Barbuda) Dexter Blackstock	(England) Leeds United	25 January 2014	
25 October 2013	MF	(Northern Ireland) David Morgan	(England) Tamworth	25 November 2013	
31 October 2013	MF	(England) Simon Gillett	(England) Bristol City	30 June 2014	
14 November 2013	MF	(France) Guy Moussi	(England) Millwall	2 January 2014	
28 November 2013	FW	(England) Ishmael Miller	(England) Yeovil Town	2 January 2014	
28 November 2013	FW	(England) Marcus Tudgay	(England) Barnsley	3 January 2014	
23 January 2014	FW	(England) Ishmael Miller	(England) Yeovil Town	30 June 2014	
21 February 2014	FW	(England) Marcus Tudgay	(England) Charlton Athletic	27 March 2014	

== Pre-season friendlies ==
6 July 2013 Friendly	Nottingham Forest	2–1	Hibernian	Vila Real de Santo António
15:00 BST	Blackstock 26' (pen.); Miller 70'	Report	68' Tudur Jones	Stadium: VRSA Stadium; Referee: Sergio Piscarreta

13 July 2013 Friendly	Mansfield Town	0–1	Nottingham Forest	Mansfield
15:00 BST		Report	1' Majewski	Stadium: Field Mill; Referee: Andrew Haines

13 July 2013 Friendly	Ilkeston	0–2	Nottingham Forest	Ilkeston
15:00 BST		Report	10' Cox; 13' Tudgay	Stadium: New Manor Ground; Attendance: 1,048; Referee: Jim Thornhill

16 July 2013 Friendly	Chesterfield	1–1	Nottingham Forest	Chesterfield
19:30 BST	Roberts 79'	Report	17' Derbyshire	Stadium: Proact Stadium; Attendance: 3,524; Referee: Craig Pawson

20 July 2013 Friendly	Nottingham Forest	2–2	Royal Antwerp	West Bridgford
15:00 BST	Derbyshire 7' (pen.); Paterson 81'	Report	58' Faucher; 65' Bakkenes	Stadium: City Ground; Attendance: 4,798; Referee: David Coote

23 July 2013 Friendly	Walsall	1–2	Nottingham Forest	Walsall
19:45 BST	Mantom 8'	Report	28' Derbyshire; 74' Reid	Stadium: Banks's Stadium; Attendance: 1,850; Referee: S. Bratt

26 July 2013 Friendly	Motherwell	1–1	Nottingham Forest	Motherwell
19:00 BST	McHugh 83'	Report	12' Derbyshire	Stadium: Fir Park; Attendance: 2,230; Referee: Alan Muir

== Competitions ==
=== Championship ===
==== Results summary ====
Overall								Home						Away					
Pld	W	D	L	GF	GA	GD	Pts	W	D	L	GF	GA	GD	W	D	L	GF	GA	GD
46	16	17	13	67	64	+3	65	10	7	6	38	29	+9	6	10	7	29	35	−6

Last updated: 3 May 2014.
Source: Nottingham Forest

Round	1	2	3	4	5	6	7	8	9	10	11	12	13	14	15	16	17	18	19	20	21	22	23	24	25	26	27	28	29	30	31	32	33	34	35	36	37	38	39	40	41	42	43	44	45	46
Ground	H	A	H	A	A	H	H	A	H	A	A	H	A	H	A	H	H	A	A	H	A	H	H	A	A	H	H	H	A	A	H	A	H	A	A	H	A	H	A	H	H	A	H	A	A	H
Result	W	W	W	D	L	W	D	D	W	D	W	D	L	L	W	D	L	D	W	D	D	W	W	D	D	W	W	W	D	W	D	L	L	L	D	D	L	L	D	L	D	L	W	W	L	L
Position	8	3	1	1	4	3	5	6	5	4	4	4	6	6	5	5	6	7	5	7	7	5	5	5	5	5	5	5	5	5	5	5	5	5	5	6	7	7	7	7	10	11	9	7	11	11

Source: Statto
A = Away; H = Home; W = Win; D = Draw; L = Loss

==== Matches ====
3 August 2013 1	Nottingham Forest	1–0	Huddersfield Town	West Bridgford
15:00 BST	Lansbury (yellow card) 52', (goal) 54'	Report	(yellow card) 65' Lynch	Stadium: City Ground; Attendance: 25,535; Referee: Graham Salisbury

10 August 2013 2	Blackburn Rovers	0–1	Nottingham Forest	Blackburn
15:00 BST	Lowe (yellow card) 58'	Report	(yellow card) 29' Lichaj; (yellow card) 73' Lansbury; (yellow card) 81', (goal) 90+2' Henderson	Stadium: Ewood Park; Attendance: 14,496; Referee: Andy Madley

17 August 2013 3	Nottingham Forest	3–0	Bolton Wanderers	West Bridgford
15:00 BST	Mackie 2'; Reid (yellow card) 45+4', (goal) 50'; Lansbury 65'	Report	(yellow card) 17' Spearing; (yellow card) 37' Medo; (yellow card) 45+2' (yellow-red card) 53' Pratley; (yellow card) 87' Chung-Yong	Stadium: City Ground; Attendance: 22,306; Referee: Mark Haywood

25 August 2013 4	Watford	1–1	Nottingham Forest	Watford
13:15 BST	McGugan 55'; Fabbrini (yellow card) 70'	Report	6' Reid; (yellow card) 58' Cohen; (yellow card) 70' Lansbury; (yellow card) 81' Miller; (yellow card) 83' Wilson; (yellow card) 87' Lichaj	Stadium: Vicarage Road; Attendance: 16,242; Referee: Oliver Langford

31 August 2013 5	Wigan Athletic	2–1	Nottingham Forest	Wigan
15:00 BST	Maloney 14' (pen.); Gómez 34'; Beausejour (yellow card) 88'	Report	8' Reid; (yellow card) 24' Lansbury; (yellow card) 30' Lichaj	Stadium: DW Stadium; Attendance: 16,270; Referee: Craig Pawson

14 September 2013 6	Nottingham Forest	3–2	Barnsley	West Bridgford
15:00 BST	Cox 18'; Etuhu 45+3' (o.g.); Moussi (yellow card) 68'; Henderson 84', (yellow card) 85'	Report	20' (pen.) O'Grady; (yellow card) 26' Ramage; (yellow card) 65' Cranie; 69' Cywka	Stadium: City Ground; Attendance: 21,181; Referee: Iain Williamson

17 September 2013 7	Nottingham Forest	2–2	Middlesbrough	West Bridgford
19:45 BST	Cox (yellow card) 33'; Halford (yellow card) 57'; Derbyshire 69'; Henderson (yellow card) 71', (goal) 78'; Lichaj (yellow card) 84'	Report	17' Kamara; (yellow card) 21', (goal) 54' Friend; (yellow card) 25' Leadbitter; (yellow card) 34' Williams; (yellow card) 36' Adomah; (red card) 90+3' Ledesma	Stadium: City Ground; Attendance: 19,509; Referee: Phil Dowd

21 September 2013 8	Doncaster Rovers	2–2	Nottingham Forest	Doncaster
15:00 BST	Macheda 35', 52', (yellow card) 52'; Wellens (yellow card) 90'	Report	40' Cohen; 81' Reid	Stadium: Keepmoat Stadium; Attendance: 12,253; Referee: Andy Haines

28 September 2013 9	Nottingham Forest	1–0	Derby County	West Bridgford
12:15 BST	Hobbs 41'; Harding (yellow card) 57'; Abdoun (yellow card) 74'; Mackie (yellow card) 77'; Cohen (yellow card) 83'	Report	(yellow card) 12' (yellow-red card) 78' Keogh; (yellow card) 90+3' Forsyth	Stadium: City Ground; Attendance: 28,276; Referee: Simon Hooper

1 October 2013 10	Charlton Athletic	1–1	Nottingham Forest	Greenwich, Greater London
19:45 BST	Sordell 50'	Report	3' Reid; (yellow card) 90+1' Lansbury	Stadium: The Valley; Attendance: 15,567; Referee: Fred Graham

5 October 2013 11	Brighton & Hove Albion	1–3	Nottingham Forest	Falmer
17:30 BST	Crofts 31', (yellow card) 90+4'	Report	(yellow card) 21' (yellow-red card) 67' Chalobah; (yellow card) 38' Lichaj; 46', 62' (pen.) Lansbury; 60' Henderson; (yellow card) 71' Cox; (yellow card) 90+3' Darlow; (yellow card) 90+3' Mackie	Stadium: Falmer Stadium; Attendance: 27,755; Referee: Craig Pawson

19 October 2013 12	Nottingham Forest	1–1	Bournemouth	West Bridgford
15:00 BST	Lansbury 39', (yellow card) 81'; Cox (yellow card) 69'; Hobbs (yellow card) 89'; Darlow (yellow card) 89'	Report	(yellow card) 52' Collison; 90+1' Pugh	Stadium: City Ground; Attendance: 28,070; Referee: Philip Gibbs

26 October 2013 13	Yeovil Town	3–1	Nottingham Forest	Yeovil
15:00 BST	Upson 8', (yellow card) 25', (goal) 40'; Dawson (yellow card) 41'; Webster 43'; Ralls (yellow card) 46'; Hoskins (yellow card) 57'	Report	42', (yellow card) 45' Chalobah; (yellow card) 54' Lascelles; (yellow card) 90+4' Reid	Stadium: Huish Park; Attendance: 7,612; Referee: Mick Russell

2 November 2013 14	Nottingham Forest	0–1	Blackpool	West Bridgford
15:00 GMT	Abdoun (red card) 35'	Report	(yellow card) 59' Bishop; (yellow card) 70' Martinez; 90+1' Dobbie	Stadium: City Ground; Attendance: 21,581; Referee: Michael Naylor

9 November 2013 15	Leicester City	0–2	Nottingham Forest	Leicester
15:00 GMT	Wasilewski (yellow card) 8'; Knockaert (yellow card) 10'; Hammond (yellow card) 90+3'	Report	31' Cox; 43' Mackie; (yellow card) 45+2' Lascelles; (yellow card) 84' Cohen	Stadium: King Power Stadium; Attendance: 30,416; Referee: Lee Mason

23 November 2013 16	Nottingham Forest	1–1	Burnley	West Bridgford
15:00 GMT	Lansbury (yellow card) 13'; Cox 41'	Report	28' (pen.) Vokes; (yellow card) 38' Arfield	Stadium: City Ground; Attendance: 22,877; Referee: Carl Boyeson

29 November 2013 17	Nottingham Forest	2–3	Reading	West Bridgford
19:45 GMT	Cox 40'; Henderson 60'; Harding (yellow card) 68'; Lascelles (yellow card) 90+1'; Lansbury (yellow card) 90+4'	Report	8', (yellow card) 47' Pogrebnyak; 13' Gorkss; (yellow card) 54' (yellow-red card) 81' Gunter; 74' Obita	Stadium: City Ground; Attendance: 21,199; Referee: Stuart Attwell

3 December 2013 18	Millwall	2–2	Nottingham Forest	Southwark, Greater London
19:45 GMT	Beevers (yellow card) 3'; Morison 8'; Martin (yellow card) 51'; Woolford 55'	Report	36' Reid; 65' Chalobah; (yellow card) 82' Hobbs	Stadium: The Den; Attendance: 9,029; Referee: Dean Whitestone

7 December 2013 19	Sheffield Wednesday	0–1	Nottingham Forest	Sheffield
15:00 GMT	Loovens (yellow card) 19'; Olofinjana (yellow card) 62'	Report	48' Cox; (yellow card) 52' Lascelles	Stadium: Hillsborough; Attendance: 23,414; Referee: Lee Probert

14 December 2013 20	Nottingham Forest	0–0	Ipswich Town	West Bridgford
15:00 GMT	Cox (yellow card) 14'; Lansbury (yellow card) 60'	Report	(yellow card) 60' Cresswell	Stadium: City Ground; Attendance: 20,966; Referee: Scott Mathieson

21 December 2013 21	Birmingham City	0–0	Nottingham Forest	Birmingham
15:00 GMT	Bartley (yellow card) 58'; Robinson (yellow card) 83'; Randolph (yellow card) 87'; Lee (yellow card) 90+1'	Report	(yellow card) 27' Harding; (red card) 82' Henderson; (yellow card) 83' Reid	Stadium: St. Andrew's; Attendance: 23,497; Referee: Bobby Madley

26 December 2013 22	Nottingham Forest	2–0	Queens Park Rangers	West Bridgford
19:30 GMT	Halford 29'; Reid 80'; Darlow (yellow card) 85'	Report	(yellow card) 49' Assou-Ekotto	Stadium: City Ground; Attendance: 22,721; Referee: Keith Stroud

29 December 2013 23	Nottingham Forest	2–1	Leeds United	West Bridgford
15:00 GMT	Halford 23'; Jara (yellow card) 56'; Derbyshire 84'	Report	(yellow card) 23' Brown; (yellow card) 40' Austin; (yellow card) 69' Murphy; 83' McCormack	Stadium: City Ground; Attendance: 26,854; Referee: James Linington

1 January 2014 24	Reading	1–1	Nottingham Forest	Reading
15:00 GMT	Williams (yellow card) 39'; Guthrie (yellow card) 53'; Le Fondre (yellow card) 59'; Pogrebnyak (yellow card) 90'; Kelly 90+5'	Report	36' Halford; (yellow card) 65' Hobbs; (yellow card) 88' Jara; (yellow card) 89' Cox	Stadium: Madejski Stadium; Attendance: 19,873; Referee: Michael Oliver

11 January 2014 25	Bolton Wanderers	1–1	Nottingham Forest	Horwich
15:00 GMT	Mills (yellow card) 54', (goal) 75'; Ngog (yellow card) 64'	Report	(yellow card) 35' Lansbury; 47' Paterson; (yellow card) 72' Halford; (yellow card) 77' Reid; (yellow card) 90+5' Henderson	Stadium: Reebok Stadium; Attendance: 17,046; Referee: Michael Naylor

18 January 2014 26	Nottingham Forest	4–1	Blackburn Rovers	West Bridgford
15:00 BST	Lansbury 15' (pen.), 34' (pen.), (yellow card) 64'; Harding (yellow card) 30'; Paterson 72'; Reid 90+5'	Report	(yellow card) 14' Taylor; 37' Marshall; (yellow card) 86' Hanley	Stadium: City Ground; Attendance: 22,456; Referee: Darren Deadman

30 January 2014 27	Nottingham Forest	4–2	Watford	West Bridgford
19:45 BST	Cox 58', 90', (yellow card) 90+1'; Henderson 73'; Mackie 82'	Report	33', (yellow card) 42', (goal) 47' Angella; (yellow card) 36' Ekstrand; (yellow card) 80' Cassetti	Stadium: City Ground; Attendance: 18,510; Referee: Simon Hooper

2 February 2014 28	Nottingham Forest	3–1	Yeovil Town	West Bridgford
15:00 BST	Webster 16' (o.g.); Cox 38'; Djebbour 90+1'	Report	25' Moore	Stadium: City Ground; Attendance: 21,393; Referee: Graham Scott

8 February 2014 29	Blackpool	1–1	Nottingham Forest	Blackpool
15:00 BST	Keogh 86'	Report	45' Lascelles	Stadium: Bloomfield Road; Attendance: 15,105; Referee: Carl Boyeson

11 February 2014 30	Huddersfield Town	0–3	Nottingham Forest	Huddersfield
19:45 BST	Vaughan (yellow card) 20'; Clayton (yellow card) 59'	Report	63', 82' Paterson; (yellow card) 72' Halford; 89' Henderson	Stadium: John Smith's Stadium; Attendance: 13,249; Referee: Nigel Miller

19 February 2014 31	Nottingham Forest	2–2	Leicester City	West Bridgford
19:45 BST	Paterson 39'; Reid 43' (pen.); Fox (yellow card) 70'; Halford (yellow card) 81'	Report	29' Vardy; (yellow card) 42' Morgan; (red card) 60' Konchesky; (yellow card) 74' De Laet; 82' Mahrez	Stadium: City Ground; Attendance: 24,808; Referee: Anthony Taylor

22 February 2014 32	Burnley	3–1	Nottingham Forest	Burnley
15:00 BST	Arfield 12'; Vokes 25', 35'	Report	(yellow card) 47' Fox; 80' Abdoun; (yellow card) 89' Greening	Stadium: Turf Moor; Attendance: 14,928; Referee: Andy D'Urso

1 March 2014 33	Nottingham Forest	1–4	Wigan Athletic	West Bridgford
15:00 BST	Paterson 54'; Fox (yellow card) 72'	Report	36' Waghorn; (yellow card) 52' Beausejour; 66' Boyce; 71' McArthur; 90+1' Gómez	Stadium: City Ground; Attendance: 23,114; Referee: Stuart Attwell

8 March 2014 34	Barnsley	1–0	Nottingham Forest	Barnsley
15:00 BST	Jennings 51'; Hunt (yellow card) 61'; Steele (yellow card) 64'; Dawson (yellow card) 74'; Mellis (yellow card) 86'	Report	(yellow card) 9' Gomis; (yellow card) 29' Fox	Stadium: Oakwell; Attendance: 12,157; Referee: Keith Stroud

11 March 2014 35	Middlesbrough	1–1	Nottingham Forest	Middlesbrough
19:45 BST	Carayol 53'	Report	(yellow card) 28' Mackie; 80' Henderson	Stadium: Riverside Stadium; Attendance: 14,134; Referee: Roger East

15 March 2014 36	Nottingham Forest	0–0	Doncaster Rovers	West Bridgford
15:00 BST	Fox (yellow card) 29'	Report	(yellow card) 68' Brown; (yellow card) 85' Duffy; (yellow card) 90+2' Johnstone	Stadium: City Ground; Attendance: 27,402; Referee: Eddie Ilderton

22 March 2014 37	Derby County	5–0	Nottingham Forest	Derby
12:15 BST	Bryson 6', 32', 69' (pen.); Thorne (yellow card) 18'; Hendrick 37'; Russell 54'	Report	(yellow card) 34' Cox; (yellow card) 73' Fox; (yellow card) 85' Lascelles	Stadium: iPro Stadium; Attendance: 33,004; Referee: Michael Naylor

25 March 2014 38	Nottingham Forest	0–1	Charlton Athletic	West Bridgford
20:00 BST	Jara (yellow card) 45'; Lascelles (yellow card) 90+2'	Report	81' Cousins	Stadium: City Ground; Attendance: 17,951; Referee: Andy Haines

29 March 2014 39	Ipswich Town	1–1	Nottingham Forest	Ipswich
15:00 BST	Murphy 78'; Williams (yellow card) 79'	Report	4' Collins; (yellow card) 26' Halford; (yellow card) 47' Jara; (yellow card) 73' Fox; (yellow card) 90+2' Darlow	Stadium: Portman Road; Attendance: 17,955; Referee: Andrew Madley

5 April 2014 40	Nottingham Forest	1–2	Millwall	West Bridgford
15:00 BST	Greening (yellow card) 51'; Paterson 53'; Lansbury (yellow card) 77'; Peltier (yellow card) 90+3'	Report	19' Malone; 39' Martin; (yellow card) 59' Maierhofer; (yellow card) 72' Morison	Stadium: City Ground; Attendance: 22,077; Referee: Mark Brown

8 April 2014 41	Nottingham Forest	3–3	Sheffield Wednesday	West Bridgford
19:45 BST	Lansbury (yellow card) 14'; Lascelles (yellow card) 25'; Mackie (yellow card) 34', (goal) 44'; Collins (yellow card) 55' (yellow-red card) 79'; Tudgay 76'; Paterson 87'	Report	15' (pen.) Maguire; (yellow card) 38' Antonio; (yellow card) 41', (goal) 57' Mattock; 45+3' Buxton; (yellow card) 77' Hélan	Stadium: City Ground; Attendance: 20,185; Referee: Scott Duncan

12 April 2014 42	Queens Park Rangers	5–2	Nottingham Forest	Hammersmith & Fulham, Greater London
12:22 BST	Benayoun 2'; Hoilett 43'; Onuoha 84'; Morrison 90'; Zamora 90+2'	Report	37' Lascelles; 75' Derbyshire	Stadium: Loftus Road; Attendance: 17,220; Referee: Oliver Langford

19 April 2014 43	Nottingham Forest	1–0	Birmingham City	West Bridgford
15:00 BST	Derbyshire 2'; Peltier (yellow card) 19'; Fox (yellow card) 88'	Report	(yellow card) 20' Hancox; (yellow card) 90+1' Robinson	Stadium: City Ground; Attendance: 21,300; Referee: Mike Jones

21 April 2014 44	Leeds United	0–2	Nottingham Forest	Leeds
17:15 BST	Lees (yellow card) 20'	Report	2', 16' Derbyshire; (yellow card) 39' Mackie	Stadium: Elland Road; Attendance: 20,517; Referee: Iain Williamson

26 April 2014 45	Bournemouth	4–1	Nottingham Forest	Bournemouth
15:00 BST	Kermorgant 43', 90+1'; Grabban 47', 70' (pen.); Cook (yellow card) 88'	Report	56' Halford; (yellow card) 62' Lascelles; (yellow card) 74' Harding	Stadium: Goldsands Stadium; Attendance: 11,021; Referee: Simon Hooper

3 May 2014 46	Nottingham Forest	1–2	Brighton & Hove Albion	West Bridgford
12:15 BST	Derbyshire 22'; Vaughan (yellow card) 63'; Collins (yellow card) 71'	Report	53' Ward; (yellow card) 58' Forster-Caskey; 90+2', (yellow card) 90+3' Ulloa	Stadium: City Ground; Attendance: 22,209; Referee: Keith Stroud

==== FA Cup ====
5 January 2014 Third round	Nottingham Forest	5–0	West Ham United	West Bridgford
12:00 GMT	Abdoun 12' (pen.); Paterson 65' 71' 79'; Reid 90+1'	Report		Stadium: City Ground; Attendance: 14,397; Referee: Martin Atkinson

24 January 2014 Fourth round	Nottingham Forest	0–0	Preston North End	West Bridgford
20:00 GMT		Report		Stadium: City Ground; Attendance: 26,465; Referee: Mike Dean

5 February 2014 Fourth round replay	Preston North End	0–2	Nottingham Forest	Preston
19:45 GMT		Report	18' Mackie; 90+4' Henderson	Stadium: Deepdale; Attendance: 9,744; Referee: Jonathan Moss

16 February 2014 Fifth round	Sheffield United	3–1	Nottingham Forest	Sheffield
15:00 GMT	Coady 66'; Porter 90' (pen.) 90+2'	Report	28' Paterson	Stadium: Bramall Lane; Attendance: 25,118; Referee: Michael Oliver

==== League Cup ====
6 August 2013 First round	Nottingham Forest	3–1	Hartlepool United	West Bridgford
19:45 BST	Majewski 33'; Halford 65'; Derbyshire 67'	Report	61' Austin	Stadium: City Ground; Attendance: 9,081; Referee: Stephen Martin

28 August 2013 Second round	Nottingham Forest	2–1 (a.e.t.)	Millwall	West Bridgford
19:45 BST	Derbyshire 58'; Lascelles 94'	Report	85' Keogh	Stadium: City Ground; Attendance: 12,201; Referee: Mark Heywood

24 September 2013 Third round	Burnley	2–1	Nottingham Forest	Burnley
19:45 BST	Ings 44' 68'	Report	24' Derbyshire	Stadium: Turf Moor; Attendance: 6,405; Referee: Darren Drysdale

== Squad statistics ==
=== Appearances and goals ===
As of 3 May 2014 (Note: Players whose names are in italics spent time on loan at other clubs during the course of the season.) (Note: Players whose names appear emboldened left the club on a permanent basis having appeared in a competitive fixture this season.)

No.	Pos	Nat	Player	Total		Championship		FA Cup		League Cup	
No.	Pos	Nat	Player	Apps	Goals	Apps	Goals	Apps	Goals	Apps	Goals
1	GK	(England) ENG	Karl Darlow	45	0	43	0	2	0	0	0
2	DF	(United States) USA	Eric Lichaj	26	0	21+3	0	2	0	0	0
3	DF	(England) ENG	Dan Harding	24	0	13+6	0	1+1	0	3	0
4	MF	(England) ENG	Simon Gillett	2	0	0	0	0	0	2	0
5	DF	(Wales) WAL	Danny Collins	28	1	21+2	1	3	0	2	0
6	MF	(France) FRA	Guy Moussi	15	0	9+2	0	2	0	2	0
7	MF	(England) ENG	Nathaniel Chalobah	12	2	7+5	2	0	0	0	0
7	MF	(Algeria) ALG	Adlène Guedioura	6	0	5	0	0	0	1	0
8	MF	(England) ENG	Chris Cohen	17	1	16	1	0	0	0+1	0
9	FW	(England) ENG	Darius Henderson	38	9	9+25	8	1+2	1	1	0
10	MF	(England) ENG	Henri Lansbury	30	7	28+1	7	1	0	0	0
11	MF	(Republic of Ireland) IRL	Andy Reid	36	10	29+3	9	3	1	0+1	0
12	FW	(Scotland) SCO	Jamie Mackie	49	5	38+7	4	2+1	1	1	0
13	DF	(Scotland) SCO	Danny Fox	15	0	14	0	1	0	0	0
14	MF	(England) ENG	Jonathan Greening	13	0	7+6	0	0	0	0	0
15	DF	(England) ENG	Greg Halford	42	5	28+8	4	4	0	1+1	1
16	DF	(England) ENG	Jamaal Lascelles	34	3	29	2	3	0	2	1
17	FW	(England) ENG	Ishmael Miller	7	0	0+4	0	0	0	0+3	0
18	DF	(Chile) CHI	Gonzalo Jara	39	0	28+4	0	4	0	3	0
19	FW	(Algeria) ALG	Rafik Djebbour	8	1	3+4	1	0+1	0	0	0
20	FW	(England) ENG	Marcus Tudgay	2	1	1+1	1	0	0	0	0
21	FW	(England) ENG	Jamie Paterson	39	12	22+10	8	3+1	4	3	0
22	DF	(England) ENG	Kelvin Wilson	9	0	7+2	0	0	0	0	0
23	FW	(Antigua and Barbuda) ANT	Dexter Blackstock	3	0	1	0	0	0	1+1	0
24	MF	(Wales) WAL	David Vaughan	10	0	9	0	1	0	0	0
25	DF	(England) ENG	Jack Hobbs	29	1	27	1	1	0	1	0
26	GK	(Bulgaria) BUL	Dimitar Evtimov	1	0	0+1	0	0	0	0	0
27	FW	(England) ENG	Matt Derbyshire	36	10	8+22	7	1+2	0	2+1	3
28	MF	(Poland) POL	Radosław Majewski	29	1	23+1	0	2+1	0	2	1
29	GK	(Netherlands) NED	Dorus de Vries	8	0	3	0	2	0	3	0
30	MF	(Republic of Ireland) IRL	Stephen McLaughlin	3	0	3	0	0	0	0	0
31	FW	(Republic of Ireland) IRL	Simon Cox	41	8	25+9	8	3+1	0	2+1	0
32	DF	(France) FRA	Kévin Gomis	1	0	1	0	0	0	0	0
36	MF	(England) ENG	Josh Rees	1	0	0+1	0	0	0	0	0
37	DF	(England) ENG	Lee Peltier	7	0	7	0	0	0	0	0
38	MF	(England) ENG	Ben Osborn	8	0	6+2	0	0	0	0	0
39	MF	(Algeria) ALG	Djamel Abdoun	27	2	15+7	1	2+2	1	1	0

Source: Season Statistics – Nottingham Forest F.C.

=== Goal Scorers ===
As of 3 May 2014

Rank	Position	Nation	Number	Name	Championship	FA Cup	League Cup	Total
1	FW	(England)	21	Jamie Paterson	8	4	0	12
2	MF	(Republic of Ireland)	11	Andy Reid	9	1	0	10
2	FW	(England)	27	Matt Derbyshire	7	0	3	10
3	FW	(England)	9	Darius Henderson	8	1	0	9
4	FW	(Republic of Ireland)	31	Simon Cox	8	0	0	8
5	MF	(England)	10	Henri Lansbury	7	0	0	7
6	FW	(Scotland)	12	Jamie Mackie	4	1	0	5
6	DF	(England)	15	Greg Halford	4	0	1	5
7	DF	(England)	16	Jamaal Lascelles	2	0	1	3
8	MF	(England)	7	Nathaniel Chalobah	2	0	0	2
8	MF	(Algeria)	39	Djamel Abdoun	1	1	0	2
8	Own Goals				2	0	0	2
9	DF	(Wales)	5	Danny Collins	1	0	0	1
9	MF	(England)	8	Chris Cohen	1	0	0	1
9	FW	(Algeria)	19	Rafik Djebbour	1	0	0	1
9	FW	(England)	20	Marcus Tudgay	1	0	0	1
9	DF	(England)	25	Jack Hobbs	1	0	0	1
9	MF	(Poland)	28	Radosław Majewski	0	0	1	1
				Totals	67	8	6	81

Source: Player Statistics – Nottingham Forest F.C.

=== Disciplinary record ===
As of 3 May 2014

No.	Position	Player	Championship		FA Cup		League Cup		Total	
No.	Position	Player	Yellow card	Red card	Yellow card	Red card	Yellow card	Red card	Yellow card	Red card
10	Midfield	(England) Henri Lansbury	12	0	0	0	0	0	12	0
16	Defence	(England) Jamaal Lascelles	8	0	2	0	2	0	12	0
13	Defence	(Scotland) Danny Fox	8	0	1	0	0	0	9	0
31	Forward	(Republic of Ireland) Simon Cox	7	0	0	0	0	0	7	0
15	Defence	(England) Greg Halford	5	0	1	0	0	0	6	0
2	Defence	(United States) Eric Lichaj	5	0	0	0	0	0	5	0
3	Defence	(England) Dan Harding	5	0	0	0	0	0	5	0
12	Forward	(Scotland) Jamie Mackie	5	0	0	0	0	0	5	0
11	Midfield	(Republic of Ireland) Andy Reid	4	0	1	0	0	0	5	0
9	Forward	(England) Darius Henderson	4	1	0	0	0	0	4	1
1	Goalkeeper	(England) Karl Darlow	4	0	0	0	0	0	4	0
18	Defence	(Chile) Gonzalo Jara	4	0	0	0	0	0	4	0
8	Midfield	(England) Chris Cohen	3	0	0	0	0	0	3	0
25	Defence	(England) Jack Hobbs	3	0	0	0	0	0	3	0
6	Midfield	(France) Guy Moussi	1	0	0	0	2	0	3	0
39	Midfield	(Algeria) Djamel Abdoun	1	1	0	0	1	0	2	1
14	Midfield	(England) Jonathan Greening	2	0	0	0	0	0	2	0
37	Defence	(England) Lee Peltier	2	0	0	0	0	0	2	0
5	Defence	(Wales) Danny Collins	1	1	0	0	0	0	1	1
7	Midfield	(England) Nathaniel Chalobah	1	1	0	0	0	0	1	1
17	Forward	(England) Ishmael Miller	1	0	0	0	0	0	1	0
22	Defence	(England) Kelvin Wilson	1	0	0	0	0	0	1	0
24	Midfield	(Wales) David Vaughan	1	0	0	0	0	0	1	0
32	Defence	(France) Kévin Gomis	1	0	0	0	0	0	1	0
27	Forward	(England) Matt Derbyshire	0	0	1	0	0	0	1	0
28	Midfield	(Poland) Radoslaw Majewski	0	0	1	0	0	0	1	0
4	Midfield	(England) Simon Gillett	0	0	0	0	1	0	1	0
TOTAL			89	4	7	0	6	0	102	4

Source: Player Statistics – Nottingham Forest F.C.
