= 2012–13 Nottingham Forest F.C. season =

English football club season

Nottingham Forest
2012–13 season
- Chairman: Frank Clark (until 10 July 2012); Omar Al-Hasawi (until December 2012)
- Manager: Steve Cotterill (until 12 July 2012); Sean O'Driscoll (from 19 July 2012 until 26 December 2012); Alex McLeish (from 27 December 2012 until 5 February 2013); Billy Davies (from 7 February 2013)
- Ground: City Ground
- Championship: 8th
- FA Cup: Third round
- League Cup: Second round
- Top goalscorer: League: Billy Sharp (10); All: Billy Sharp (11)
- Highest home attendance: 28,707 vs. Derby County (Championship, 30 September 2012)
- Lowest home attendance: 7,545 vs. Wigan Athletic (League Cup, 28 August 2012)
Home colours	Away colours

The 2012–13 season was Nottingham Forest Football Club's fifth consecutive season in the Championship since promotion in 2007–08.

== First team squad ==
As of 3 May 2013

No.	Player	Nationality	Date of birth (age)	Signed from	Year signed	Year contract expires
Goalkeepers
1	Lee Camp	(England)	22 August 1984 (aged 28)	(England) Queens Park Rangers	2011	2017
12	Karl Darlow	(England)	8 October 1990 (aged 22)	Academy	2011	2017
31	Dimitar Evtimov	(Bulgaria)	7 September 1993 (aged 19)	(Bulgaria) Chavdar Etropole	2011	2015
Defenders
2	Sam Hutchinson	(England)	3 August 1989 (aged 23)	(England) Chelsea	2012	2013
3	Dan Harding	(England)	23 December 1983 (aged 29)	(England) Southampton	2012	2015
5	Danny Collins	(Wales)	6 August 1980 (aged 32)	(England) Stoke City	2012	2015
15	Greg Halford	(England)	8 December 1984 (aged 28)	(England) Portsmouth	2012	2015
16	Jamaal Lascelles	(England)	11 November 1993 (aged 19)	Academy	2012	2018
18	Brendan Moloney	(Republic of Ireland)	18 January 1989 (aged 24)	Academy	2013	2014
26	Daniel Ayala	(Spain)	7 November 1990 (aged 22)	(England) Norwich City	2012	2013
32	Elliott Ward	(England)	19 January 1985 (aged 28)	(England) Norwich City	2012	2013
36	Gonzalo Jara	(Chile)	29 August 1985 (aged 27)	(England) West Bromwich Albion	2013	2014
37	Kieran Fenton	(England)	25 November 1994 (aged 18)	Academy	2012	2013
Midfielders
4	Simon Gillett	(England)	6 November 1984 (aged 28)	(England) Doncaster Rovers	2012	2014
6	Guy Moussi	(France)	23 January 1985 (aged 28)	(France) Angers	2008	2014
7	Adlene Guedioura	(Algeria)	12 November 1985 (aged 27)	(England) Wolverhampton Wanderers	2012	2015
8	Chris Cohen (c)	(England)	5 March 1987 (aged 26)	(England) Yeovil Town	2007	2015
10	Lewis McGugan	(England)	25 October 1988 (aged 24)	Academy	2007	2013
11	Andy Reid (vc)	(Republic of Ireland)	29 July 1982 (aged 30)	(England) Blackpool	2011	2016
14	Jonathan Greening	(England)	2 January 1979 (aged 34)	(England) Fulham	2011	2014
22	Henri Lansbury	(England)	12 October 1990 (aged 22)	(England) Arsenal	2012	2015
28	Radoslaw Majewski	(Poland)	15 December 1986 (aged 26)	(Poland) Polonia Warsaw	2009	2016
30	Stephen McLaughlin	(Republic of Ireland)	14 June 1990 (aged 23)	(Republic of Ireland) Derry City	2013	2016
36	Jermaine Jenas	(England)	25 February 1983 (aged 30)	(England) Tottenham Hotspur	2012	2013
38	Jack Blake	(Scotland)	22 September 1994 (aged 18)	Academy	2012	2014
Forwards
9	Darius Henderson	(England)	7 September 1981 (aged 31)	(England) Millwall	2013	2015
17	David McGoldrick	(England)	29 November 1987 (aged 25)	(England) Southampton	2013	2016
19	Simon Cox	(Republic of Ireland)	28 April 1987 (aged 26)	(England) West Bromwich Albion	2012	2015
20	Marcus Tudgay	(England)	3 February 1983 (aged 30)	(England) Sheffield Wednesday	2011	2014
24	Billy Sharp	(England)	5 February 1986 (aged 27)	(England) Southampton	2012	2013
23	Dexter Blackstock	(Antigua and Barbuda)	20 May 1986 (aged 27)	(England) Queens Park Rangers	2009	2017
27	Matt Derbyshire	(England)	14 April 1986 (aged 27)	(Greece) Olympiacos	2011	2014
34	Morgan Ferrier	(England)	15 November 1994 (aged 18)	Academy	2012	2013

== Transfers in ==
#kit	Pos	Player	From	Fee	Date
7	MF	(Algeria) Adlène Guedioura	Wolverhampton Wanderers	£1,000,000	23 July 2012
5	DF	(Wales) Danny Collins	Stoke City	Undisclosed	26 July 2012
15	DF	(England) Greg Halford	Portsmouth	Undisclosed	27 July 2012
3	DF	(England) Dan Harding	Southampton	Undisclosed	28 July 2012
4	MF	(England) Simon Gillett	Doncaster Rovers	Free	4 August 2012
19	FW	(Republic of Ireland) Simon Cox	West Bromwich Albion	Undisclosed	14 August 2012
22	MF	(England) Henri Lansbury	Arsenal	£1,000,000	28 August 2012
30	MF	(Republic of Ireland) Stephen McLaughlin	Derry City	Undisclosed	3 January 2013
35	GK	(Kuwait) Khaled Al-Rashidi	Al-Arabi SC	Free	16 January 2013
9	FW	(England) Darius Henderson	Millwall	Free	24 January 2013

== Transfers out ==
#	Pos	Player	To	Fee	Date
	MF	(England) Garath McCleary	(England) Reading	Free	1 July 2012
	MF	(Netherlands) George Boateng	(Malaysia) T-Team	Free	1 July 2012
	DF	(England) Luke Chambers	(England) Ipswich Town	Free	1 July 2012
	DF	(Wales) Joel Lynch	(England) Huddersfield Town	Free	11 July 2012
	DF	(Wales) Chris Gunter	(England) Reading	£2,300,000	17 July 2012
	MF	(England) Paul Anderson	(England) Bristol City	Free	26 July 2012
	GK	(England) Paul Smith	(England) Southend	Free	20 August 2012
24	DF	(Wales) Kieron Freeman	(England) Derby County	Undisclosed	22 August 2012
9	FW	(United States) Robbie Findley	(United States) Real Salt Lake	Undisclosed	14 January 2012
1	GK	(Northern Ireland) Lee Camp	(England) Norwich	Free	23 January 2013
18	DF	(Republic of Ireland) Brendan Moloney	(England) Bristol City	Free	25 January 2013

^{1}Fee was officially reported as Undisclosed.

== Loans in ==
#	Pos	Player	From	Start	End
26	DF	(Spain) Daniel Ayala	Norwich City	7 August 2012	End of season
2	DF	(England) Sam Hutchinson	Chelsea	16 August 2012	End of season
24	FW	(England) Billy Sharp	Southampton	31 August 2012	End of season
21	MF	(England) James Coppinger	Doncaster Rovers	31 August 2012	29 December 2012
36	MF	(England) Jermaine Jenas	Tottenham Hotspur	28 September 2012	2 January 2013
32	DF	(England) Elliott Ward	Norwich	26 October 2012	1 January 2013
29	DF	(Scotland) Alan Hutton	Aston Villa	22 November 2012	1 January 2013
36	DF	(Chile) Gonzalo Jara	West Brom	10 January 2013	End of season
32	DF	(England) Elliott Ward	Norwich	10 January 2013	End of season

== Loans out ==
#	Pos	Player	To	Start	End
25	FW	(England) Ishmael Miller	Middlesbrough	25 August 2012	End of season
17	FW	(England) David McGoldrick	Coventry City	31 August 2012	2 January 2013
27	FW	(England) Matt Derbyshire	Oldham Athletic	14 September 2012	15 December 2012
	MF	(England) David Morgan	Lincoln City	14 August 2012	2 January 2013
12	GK	(England) Karl Darlow	Walsall	21 September 2012	26 October 2012
9	FW	(United States) Robbie Findley	Gillingham	21 September 2012	1 November 2012
20	FW	(England) Marcus Tudgay	Barnsley	14 November 2012	1 January 2013
	DF	(England) Matty Regan	Tamworth	3 December 2012	21 January 2013
12	GK	(England) Karl Darlow	Walsall	1 January 2013	10 January 2012
17	FW	(England) David McGoldrick	Ipswich Town	4 January 2013	End of season
27	FW	(England) Matt Derbyshire	Blackpool	25 January 2013	End of season
	MF	(England) David Morgan	Dundee	31 January 2013	End of season

== Squad statistics ==
=== Appearances and goals ===
This is a list of the first-team players from the 2012–13 season.

As of 4 May 2013

No.	Pos	Nat	Player	Total		Championship		FA Cup		League Cup	
No.	Pos	Nat	Player	Apps	Goals	Apps	Goals	Apps	Goals	Apps	Goals
1	GK	(Northern Ireland) NIR	Lee Camp	28	0	26	0	1	0	1	0
2	DF	(England) ENG	Sam Hutchinson	9	1	6+3	1	0	0	0	0
3	DF	(England) ENG	Dan Harding	30	0	26+1	0	1	0	2	0
4	MF	(England) ENG	Simon Gillett	27	0	24+1	0	1	0	1	0
5	DF	(Wales) WAL	Danny Collins	43	0	37+3	0	1	0	2	0
6	MF	(France) FRA	Guy Moussi	19	0	6+12	0	0	0	1	0
7	MF	(Algeria) ALG	Adlène Guedioura	36	3	30+5	3	0	0	1	0
8	MF	(England) ENG	Chris Cohen	40	2	36+2	2	1	0	1	0
9	FW	(England) ENG	Darius Henderson	11	2	7+4	2	0	0	0	0
10	MF	(England) ENG	Lewis McGugan	32	8	13+17	8	0+1	0	1	0
11	MF	(Ireland) EIR	Andy Reid	45	5	40+2	5	1	0	2	0
12	GK	(England) ENG	Karl Darlow	21	0	20	0	0	0	1	0
14	MF	(England) ENG	Jonathan Greening	6	0	0+5	0	0	0	0+1	0
15	DF	(England) ENG	Greg Halford	40	3	34+3	3	1	0	2	0
16	DF	(England) ENG	Jamaal Lascelles	3	0	0+2	0	0	0	0+1	0
17	FW	(England) ENG	David McGoldrick	1	0	0	0	0	0	1	0
18	DF	(Ireland) EIR	Brendan Moloney	16	0	7+6	0	1	0	1+1	0
19	FW	(Ireland) EIR	Simon Cox	41	6	32+7	5	1	0	1	1
20	FW	(England) ENG	Marcus Tudgay	4	0	0+3	0	0	0	0+1	0
21	MF	(England) ENG	James Coppinger	6	0	2+4	0	0	0	0	0
22	MF	(England) ENG	Henri Lansbury	32	5	24+8	5	0	0	0	0
23	FW	(Antigua and Barbuda) ANT	Dexter Blackstock	39	7	21+16	6	1	0	1	1
24	FW	(England) ENG	Billy Sharp	40	11	30+9	10	0+1	1	0	0
26	DF	(Spain) ESP	Daniel Ayala	14	1	12	1	0	0	2	0
28	MF	(Poland) POL	Radosław Majewski	34	5	21+10	5	1	0	1+1	0
32	DF	(England) ENG	Elliott Ward	31	3	29+2	3	0	0	0	0
36	MF	(England) ENG	Jermaine Jenas	6	1	1+5	1	0	0	0	0
36	DF	(Chile) CHI	Gonzalo Jara	17	0	15+2	0	0	0	0	0

== Competitions ==
=== Championship ===
==== Table ====
Pos	Team	Pld	W	D	L	GF	GA	GD	Pts	Promotion or relegation
6	Leicester City	46	19	11	16	71	48	+23	68	Qualification for Championship play-offs
7	Bolton Wanderers	46	18	14	14	69	61	+8	68	
8	Nottingham Forest	46	17	16	13	63	59	+4	67	
9	Charlton Athletic	46	17	14	15	65	59	+6	65	
10	Derby County	46	16	13	17	65	62	+3	61	

Updated to match(es) played on 4 May 2013. Source: BBC Sport
Rules for classification: 1) points; 2) goal difference; 3) number of goals scored.

==== Results summary ====
Overall								Home						Away					
Pld	W	D	L	GF	GA	GD	Pts	W	D	L	GF	GA	GD	W	D	L	GF	GA	GD
46	17	16	13	63	59	+4	67	10	8	5	37	28	+9	7	8	8	26	31	−5

Last updated: 4 May 2013.
Source: Football League

Round	1	2	3	4	5	6	7	8	9	10	11	12	13	14	15	16	17	18	19	20	21	22	23	24	25	26	27	28	29	30	31	32	33	34	35	36	37	38	39	40	41	42	43	44	45	46
Ground	H	A	A	H	H	A	A	H	H	A	H	A	A	H	H	A	H	A	A	H	H	A	A	H	H	A	H	A	H	A	A	H	H	A	A	H	H	A	H	A	H	A	A	H	A	H
Result	W	D	D	W	D	D	L	L	D	W	W	D	W	L	D	D	W	W	L	L	W	D	L	W	D	L	W	D	L	L	L	D	W	W	W	W	W	W	D	D	D	L	L	D	W	L
Position	5	4	2	3	6	6	10	17	16	12	11	10	7	8	11	11	9	7	9	9	9	9	11	8	7	11	9	10	10	11	13	11	8	8	8	7	6	5	5	5	5	7	8	8	7	8

Updated to match(es) played on 4 May 2013. Source: Statto
A = Away; H = Home; W = Win; D = Draw; L = Loss

== Matches ==
=== Competitive ===
==== Championship ====
August

18 August 2012 1	Nottingham Forest	1–0	Bristol City	Nottingham
15:00 BST	Reid (yellow card) 39'; Guedioura 71'		Cunningham (yellow card) 39'	Stadium: City Ground; Attendance: 21,575; Referee: Nigel Miller

21 August 2012 2	Huddersfield Town	1–1	Nottingham Forest	Huddersfield
19:45 BST	Ward (yellow card) 87'; Rhodes 90+3'	Report	Halford (yellow card) 51'; Gillett (yellow card) 52'; Cox 68'	Stadium: Galpharm Stadium; Attendance: 15,434; Referee: Neil Swarbrick

24 August 2012 3	Bolton Wanderers	2–2	Nottingham Forest	Bolton
19:45 BST	Davies (yellow card) 1'; Eagles 39'; Sordell 49'; Mears (yellow card) 77'; Knight (yellow card) 87'		McGugan 15'; Reid (yellow card) 34'; Moloney (yellow card) 45+1'; Reid 57'; Guedioura (yellow card) 64'	Stadium: Reebok Stadium; Attendance: 17,361; Referee: Dean Whitestone

September

1 September 2012 4	Nottingham Forest	2–1	Charlton Athletic	Nottingham
15:00 BST	McGugan 17'; Guedioura (yellow card) 55'; Cox (yellow card) 65'; Hutchinson 75'; Blackstock (yellow card) 88'		Jackson (yellow card) 67'; Morrison (yellow card) 76'; Hamer (yellow card) 76'; Camp 88' (o.g.)	Stadium: City Ground; Attendance: 19,745; Referee: Graham Salisbury

15 September 2012 5	Nottingham Forest	2–2	Birmingham City	Nottingham
15:00 BST	Ayala (yellow card) 22'; Hutchinson (yellow card) 54'; Cox 73'; Collins (yellow card) 75'; Ibanez 86' (o.g.); Cox (yellow card) 88'		Mullins 69'; King 71'	Stadium: City Ground; Attendance: 22,738; Referee: Mark Halsey

18 September 2012 6	Crystal Palace	1–1	Nottingham Forest	London
19:45 BST	Dikgacoi 50'; Murray (yellow card) 90+4'		Halford (yellow card) 39'; Guedioura (yellow card) 56'; Blackstock (yellow card) 75'; Blackstock 81'	Stadium: Selhurst Park; Attendance: 13,153; Referee: Iain Williamson

22 September 2012 7	Leeds United	2–1	Nottingham Forest	Leeds
15:00 BST	Becchio 14'; Pearce (yellow card) 29'; Poleon 25'; Lees (yellow card) 79'; Diouf (yellow card) 90+5'		Blackstock 60'; Cox (yellow card) 90+3'	Stadium: Elland Road; Attendance: 24,292; Referee: Andy D'Urso

30 September 2012 8	Nottingham Forest	0–1	Derby County	Nottingham
13:15 BST	Reid (yellow card) 21'; Blackstock (red card) 46'; Gillet (yellow card) 69'; Cox (yellow card) 90'; Lansbury (yellow card) 90+5'		Buxton (yellow card) 23'; Roberts (yellow card) 39'; Byson 54'	Stadium: City Ground; Attendance: 28,707; Referee: Bobby Madley

October

3 October 2012 9	Nottingham Forest	0–0	Blackburn Rovers	Nottingham
19:45 BST				Stadium: City Ground; Attendance: 18,748; Referee: Mick Russell

6 October 2012 10	Peterborough United	0–1	Nottingham Forest	Peterborough
15:00 BST			Reid 51'; Halford (yellow card) 84'	Stadium: London Road Stadium; Attendance: 10,469; Referee: Mark Haywood

20 October 2012 11	Nottingham Forest	3–1	Cardiff City	Nottingham
15:00 BST	Reid 25'; Ayala 27'; Cox (yellow card) 45+1'; Sharp 47'; Guedioura (yellow card) 58' (yellow-red card) 84'	Report	Connolly (yellow card) 45'; Helguson 74'; Hudson (yellow card) 90'	Stadium: City Ground; Attendance: 21,491; Referee: Darren Drysdale

23 October 2012 12	Blackpool	2–2	Nottingham Forest	Blackpool
19:45 BST	Evatt (yellow card) 63'; Grandin 70'; Taylor-Fletcher 75'	Report	Sharp 25'; Cohen (yellow card) 44'; Blackstock 90'	Stadium: Bloomfield Road; Attendance: 13,228; Referee: Eddie Ilderton

27 October 2012 13	Barnsley	1–4	Nottingham Forest	Barnsley
15:00 BST	Harewood 24'	Report	Halford 35'; Cox 42'; Cohen 45'; Halford (yellow card) 66'; Jenas 77'	Stadium: Oakwell; Attendance: 10,186; Referee: Kevin Friend

November

3 November 2012 14	Nottingham Forest	1–4	Millwall	Nottingham
15:00 BST	Harding (yellow card) 3'; Sharp 22'	Report	Trotter 3'; Henderson 60'; Abdou (yellow card) 65'; Wood 76'; Keogh 84'	Stadium: City Ground; Attendance: 24,160; Referee: Scott Mathieson

6 November 2012 15	Nottingham Forest	0–0	Middlesbrough	Nottingham
19:45 BST	Guedioura (yellow card) 71'	Report	Leadbitter (yellow card) 68'	Stadium: City Ground; Attendance: 20,150; Referee: Simon Hooper

10 November 2012 16	Leicester City	2–2	Nottingham Forest	Leicester
12:45 BST	Ward 7' (o.g.); Nugent 32'	Report	Guedioura 22'; Cox 67' (pen.)	Stadium: King Power Stadium; Attendance: 24,793; Referee: Anthony Taylor

17 November 2012 17	Nottingham Forest	1–0	Sheffield Wednesday	Nottingham
15:00 BST	Llera 75' (o.g.)	Report	Llera (yellow card) 90'	Stadium: City Ground; Attendance: 24,584; Referee: Andy Woolmer

24 November 2012 18	Wolverhampton Wanderers	1–2	Nottingham Forest	Wolverhampton
12:45 BST	Sigurðarson 5'; Doyle (yellow card) 37'	Report	Sharp 16'; Lansbury (yellow card) 41'; Guedioura 57'	Stadium: Molineux Stadium; Attendance: 22,527; Referee: Roger East

27 November 2012 19	Ipswich Town	3–1	Nottingham Forest	Ipswich
19:45 BST	N'Daw 30'; Hyam 61'; Orr (yellow card) 69'; Hyam (yellow card) 69'; Murphy 89'	Report	Camp (yellow card) 16'; Blackstock 58'; Sharp (yellow card) 69'	Stadium: Portman Road; Attendance: 16,200; Referee: Andy D'Urso

December

1 December 2012 20	Nottingham Forest	1–2	Hull City	Nottingham
15:00 BST	Sharp 43' (pen.)	Report	Koren 34' (pen.); McShane 69'; Brady (yellow card) 86'; Stockdale (yellow card) 87'; Meyler (yellow card) 89'; Rosenior (yellow card) 90+2'	Stadium: City Ground; Attendance: 19,472; Referee: Gavin Ward

8 December 2012 21	Nottingham Forest	2–0	Burnley	Nottingham
15:00 BST	Blackstock 59'; Sharp 76'; Sharp (yellow card) 79'; Cohen (yellow card) 90+1'	Report	McCann (yellow card) 41'; Duff (yellow card) 65'; Marney (yellow card) 89'	Stadium: City Ground; Attendance: 19,672; Referee: Mark Heywood

15 December 2012 22	Brighton & Hove Albion	0–0	Nottingham Forest	Brighton & Hove
15:00 BST		Report	Reid (yellow card) 16'; Halford (yellow card) 53'	Stadium: Falmer Stadium; Attendance: 26,684; Referee: Graham Salisbury

22 December 2012 23	Watford	2–0	Nottingham Forest	Watford
15:00 BST	Vydra 15'; Vydra 40'; Cassetti (yellow card) 67'; Deeney (yellow card) 73'; Beleck (yellow card) 82'	Report	Ayala (yellow card) 23' (yellow-red card) 38'; Ward (yellow card) 73'; Cox (yellow card) 76'; Sharp (yellow card) 77'	Stadium: Vicarage Road; Attendance: 15,143; Referee: Neil Swarbrick

26 December 2012 24	Nottingham Forest	4–2	Leeds United	Nottingham
12:15 BST	Sharp 44' (pen.); Sharp 54'; Austin 57' (o.g.); Blackstock 61'	Report	Green 12'; Brown (yellow card) 33'; Green (yellow card) 52'; Somma 90'	Stadium: City Ground; Attendance: 26,670; Referee: Lee Probert

29 December 2012 25	Nottingham Forest	2–2	Crystal Palace	Nottingham
15:00 BST	Reid 45'; Sharp 90+2'; Halford (yellow card) 32'; Sharp (yellow card) 54'; Harding (yellow card) 90+4'	Report	Murray 9'; Murray 81'; Jedinak (yellow card) 59'	Stadium: City Ground; Attendance: 23,703; Referee: Mark Haywood

January

1 January 2013 26	Blackburn Rovers	3–0	Nottingham Forest	Blackburn
15:00 BST	Rochina 48'; Murphy (yellow card) 72'; Rhodes 75'; Kazim-Richards 78'; Kazim-Richards (yellow card) 80'	Report	Lansbury (yellow card) 34'	Stadium: Ewood Park; Attendance: 15,490; Referee: Geoff Eltringham

12 January 2013 27	Nottingham Forest	2–1	Peterborough United	Nottingham
15:00 BST	Halford 28'; Ward 83'; Greening (yellow card) 85'	Report	Wootton 60'; Petrucci (yellow card) 75'	Stadium: City Ground; Attendance: 22,777; Referee: Eddie Ilderton

19 January 2013 28	Derby County	1–1	Nottingham Forest	Derby
13:00 BST	Ward 52'	Report	Cohen 31'; Ward (yellow card) 60'	Stadium: Pride Park Stadium; Attendance: 33,010; Referee: Mark Clattenburg

26 January 2013 29	Nottingham Forest	0–3	Watford	Nottingham
15:00 BST	Cox (yellow card) 51'	Report	Vydra 20'; Doyley (yellow card) 26'; Deeney 34'; Chalobah (yellow card) 36'; Vydra 72'; Yeates (yellow card) 87'	Stadium: City Ground; Attendance: 20,732; Referee: Andy Haines

February

2 February 2013 30	Birmingham City	2–1	Nottingham Forest	Birmingham
15:00 BST	Burke 45'; Gomis (yellow card) 61'; Burke 80'; Elliott (yellow card) 90+2'	Report	Sharp 90+2' (pen.)	Stadium: St Andrew's; Attendance: 17,738; Referee: Darren Deadman

9 February 2013 31	Bristol City	2–0	Nottingham Forest	Bristol
15:00 BST	Davies 50'; Cunningham (yellow card) 52'; Elliott 62'	Report	Halford (yellow card) 61'	Stadium: Ashton Gate Stadium; Attendance: 13,768; Referee: Craig Pawson

16 February 2013 32	Nottingham Forest	1–1	Bolton Wanderers	Nottingham
15:00 BST	Halford (yellow card) 56'; Reid 59'	Report	Mears (yellow card) 37'; Davies (yellow card) 50'; Alonso (yellow card) 71'; Davies 77'; Davies (yellow card) 90+3'	Stadium: City Ground; Attendance: 24,409; Referee: Keith Stroud

19 February 2013 33	Nottingham Forest	6–1	Huddersfield Town	Nottingham
19:45 BST	Majewski 21', 37', 43'; Ward 24'; Lansbury 55'; Henderson 90+2'	Report	Vaughan 10'; Lynch (yellow card) 40'; Arfield (yellow card) 69'	Stadium: City Ground; Attendance: 26,938; Referee: Paul Tierney

23 February 2013 34	Charlton Athletic	0–2	Nottingham Forest	Charlton
15:00 BST	Kermorgant (red card) 37'	Report	Majewski 53'; Lansbury 61'; Halford (yellow card) 90+2'	Stadium: The Valley; Attendance: 18,697; Referee: Andrew Madley

March

2 March 2013 35	Sheffield Wednesday	0–1	Nottingham Forest	Sheffield
17:20 BST	Antonio (yellow card) 89'	Report	Majewski 27'; Blackstock (yellow card) 42'; Lansbury (yellow card) 49'; Majewski (yellow card) 51'; Guedioura (yellow card) 86'	Stadium: Hillsborough Stadium; Attendance: 23,220; Referee: Michael Oliver

5 March 2013 36	Nottingham Forest	1–0	Ipswich Town	Nottingham
19:45 BST	Ward (yellow card) 6'; Lansbury (yellow card) 41'; McGugan 84'; Hutchinson (yellow card) 87'; Reid (yellow card) 89'	Report	Stearman (yellow card) 16' (yellow-red card) 69'; Martin (red card) 40'	Stadium: City Ground; Attendance: 19,458; Referee: David Webb

9 March 2013 37	Nottingham Forest	3–1	Wolverhampton Wanderers	Nottingham
15:00 BST	Lansbury 31', 67'; McGugan 90'	Report	Doherty 65'; Ward (red card) 83'	Stadium: City Ground; Attendance: 23,350; Referee: Michael Naylor

16 March 2013 38	Hull City	1–2	Nottingham Forest	Kingston upon Hull
15:00 BST	Gedo (yellow card) 40'; Boyd 45+1'; Brady (yellow card) 90+3'	Report	Jara (yellow card) 35'; Henderson 55'; Henderson (yellow card) 71'; Lansbury (yellow card) 74'; Cohen (yellow card) 75'; McGugan 84'; Darlow (yellow card) 90'	Stadium: KC Stadium; Attendance: 19,848; Referee: Graham Scott

30 March 2013 39	Nottingham Forest	2 –2	Brighton & Hove Albion	Nottingham
15:00 BST	Collins (yellow card) 18'; Majewski (yellow card) 65'; McGugan 82'; Lansbury 90'; Lansbury (yellow card) 90+1'	Report	LuaLua (yellow card) 45+1'; Ulloa 57'; Ankergren (yellow card) 62'; Buckley 85'	Stadium: City Ground; Attendance: 28,124; Referee: James Linington

April

1 April 2013 40	Burnley	1–1	Nottingham Forest	Burnley
15:00 BST	Wallace (yellow card) 27'; Stanislas 68'; Mills (yellow card) 82'	Report	Lansbury (yellow card) 65'; McGugan 90+7' (pen.)	Stadium: Turf Moor; Attendance: 13,618; Referee: Nigel Miller

6 April 2013 41	Nottingham Forest	1–1	Blackpool	Nottingham
15:00 BST	Henderson (yellow card) 45'; McGugan 81' (pen.); Cox (yellow card) 83'; Halford (yellow card) 90+5'	Report	Sylvestre 27'; Broadfoot (yellow card) 45'; Osbourne (red card) 58'; Basham (yellow card) 81'	Stadium: City Ground; Attendance: 22,814; Referee: Craig Pawson

13 April 2013 42	Cardiff City	3–0	Nottingham Forest	Cardiff
15:00 BST	Helguson 26'; Mutch (yellow card) 45+1'; Gestede 60', 66'	Report	Halford (yellow card) 25'; Jara (yellow card) 36'; Henderson (red card) 42'; Guedioura (yellow card) 58'; Blackstock (yellow card) 59'; Moussi (yellow card) 85'	Stadium: Cardiff City Stadium; Attendance: 26,588; Referee: Andre Marriner

16 April 2013 43	Middlesbrough	1–0	Nottingham Forest	Middlesbrough
19:45 BST	Williams (yellow card) 11'; Carayol 42'; Smallwood (yellow card) 75'	Report	Blackstock (yellow card) 90+1'	Stadium: Riverside Stadium; Attendance: 13,861; Referee: Mark Heywood

20 April 2013 44	Nottingham Forest	0–0	Barnsley	Nottingham
15:00 BST	Cohen (yellow card) 90+4'	Report	Cranie (yellow card) 42'; Jones (yellow card) 55'	Stadium: City Ground; Attendance: 22,230; Referee: Andy Haines

27 April 2013 45	Millwall	0–1	Nottingham Forest	London
15:00 BST	Dunne (yellow card) 63'	Report	Halford 8'; Ward (yellow card) 42'; Cox (yellow card) 89'	Stadium: The Den; Attendance: 12,330; Referee: Kevin Wright

May

4 May 2013 46	Nottingham Forest	2–3	Leicester City	Nottingham
12:45 BST	Cox 3'; Lansbury (yellow card) 49'; Ward 50'	Report	James 24'; Morgan (yellow card) 39'; King 43'; Knockaert 90'; Knockaert (yellow card) 90+1'	Stadium: City Ground; Attendance: 28,646; Referee: Mike Dean

==== League Cup ====
13 August 2012 R1	Fleetwood Town	0–1	Nottingham Forest	Fleetwood
19:45 BST			Blackstock 57'	Stadium: Highbury Stadium

28 August 2012 R2	Nottingham Forest	1–4	Wigan Athletic	Nottingham
19:45 BST	Cox 47'		Boselli 25'; Figueroa 35'; Gómez 44'; McManaman 90'	Stadium: City Ground; Attendance: 7,545; Referee: Geoff Eltringham

==== FA Cup ====
5 January 2013 R3	Nottingham Forest	2–3	Oldham Athletic	Nottingham
15:00 BST	Smith 13' (o.g.); Sharp 90+4'	Report	Simpson 54', 58'; Baxter 61'	Stadium: City Ground; Attendance: 11,293; Referee: Roger East

=== Pre-season ===
4 August 2012 Friendly	Nottingham Forest	3–1	Aston Villa	Nottingham
15:00 BST	McGugan 71', 84'; Tudgay 77'		Bannan 73'	Stadium: City Ground

7 August 2012 Friendly	Notts County	2–2	Nottingham Forest	Nottingham
19:45 BST	Judge 53'; Arquin 56'	Report	McGoldrick 10'; McGugan 14' (pen.)	Stadium: Meadow Lane

10 August 2012 Friendly	Nottingham Forest	0–2	West Bromwich Albion	Nottingham
19:45 BST			Mulumbu 7'; Long 18' (pen.)	Stadium: City Ground
