= Brendan Moloney =

Irish footballer (born 1989)

Personal information
- Full name: Brendan Anthony Moloney
- Date of birth: 18 January 1989 (age 37)
- Place of birth: Beaufort, Ireland
- Height: 1.85 m (6 ft 1 in)
- Position: Right-back

Youth career
- Killarney Athletic
- Belvedere
- ?–2006: Nottingham Forest

Senior career*
Years	Team	Apps	(Gls)
2006–2013	Nottingham Forest	42	(0)
2008	→ Chesterfield (loan)	9	(1)
2008	→ Rushden & Diamonds (loan)	4	(0)
2009–2010	→ Notts County (loan)	18	(1)
2010	→ Scunthorpe United (loan)	3	(0)
2013–2014	Bristol City	49	(0)
2014–2015	Yeovil Town	5	(0)
2015	→ Northampton Town (loan)	5	(0)
2015–2018	Northampton Town	99	(2)
Total		234	(4)

International career
2009–2011	Republic of Ireland U21	6	(0)
- * Club domestic league appearances and goals

Brendan Anthony Moloney (born 18 January 1989) is an Irish former professional footballer who played mainly as a right-back.

== Career ==
Born in Beaufort, Killarney, County Kerry, he was a graduate of the Nottingham Forest Youth Academy and captained the Nottingham Forest reserve team that just missed out on the title in 2006–07.

In an interview at the tail-end of the 2006–07 season, Forest boss Colin Calderwood picked out Moloney out of his Youth Team as having "fantastic potential". He made his début in March 2007, coming on as substitute against Gillingham wearing the number 35 shirt. He made his first start for Forest in their opening game of the 2007–08 campaign, against AFC Bournemouth.

On 10 January 2008, Moloney completed a loan move to Chesterfield on a month-long loan. He made his début for them on 12 January 2008, against Brentford. The youngster impressed for Chesterfield on loan, and netted his first professional goal for the Spireites in his third game for the club, with a 25-yard shot in their 4–0 victory over Hereford United. He played a total of nine games for Chesterfield, before returning to Forest's team in summer 2008.

With The Reds gaining promotion, manager Colin Calderwood commented that he would give Moloney a chance to impress in the Football League Championship during the 2008–09 campaign. He was loaned out at the beginning of the season to Rushden & Diamonds, where he appeared six times.

Moloney went out on a six-month loan to city rivals Notts County on 1 July 2009 after turning down offers from Bradford City and non-league Ilkeston Town. Moloney scored on his debut for Notts County in the 5–0 win over Bradford City.

On 27 January 2010, Moloney joined English League Championship side Scunthorpe United on loan for the remainder of the 2009–10 season. However, he returned after only 3 games after a challenge by Chris Brunt of West Bromwich Albion ended his season.

On 1 March 2011, Brendan Moloney came on as a substitute for the injured Joel Lynch against Middlesbrough. He made his first start of the season on 12 April 2011 in the match against Burnley helping Forest win 2–0. Moloney also started Nottingham Forest's play-off semi final home leg against Swansea City at The City Ground on 12 May 2011 and the away leg at the Liberty Stadium.

Moloney made his first league start of the 2011–12 season in Nottingham Forest's first league win of the campaign against Doncaster Rovers, where the Reds won, 1–0, thanks to a goal from Chris Gunter, that came from a Moloney cross.

Moloney joined Bristol City on a two-and-a-half-year contract on 25 January 2013. He scored his first and only goal for the club in a Football League Trophy tie against Wycombe Wanderers.

Moloney cancelled his contract with Bristol City in July 2014, joining Yeovil Town on 8 July 2014 on a two-year deal after Luke Ayling went the other way.

On 2 January 2015, Moloney moved on loan to League Two side Northampton Town until the end of the season. After spending the whole of January on loan at Northampton, Moloney signed a three-and-a-half-year deal with the Cobblers, having been released from his Yeovil contract. In June 2018 Moloney rejected a new contract offer from Northampton and retired from football due to a persistent knee injury.

== Career statistics ==
Appearances and goals by club, season and competition
Club	Season	League			FA Cup		League Cup		Other		Total	
Club	Season	Division	Apps	Goals	Apps	Goals	Apps	Goals	Apps	Goals	Apps	Goals
Nottingham Forest	2006–07	League One	1	0	0	0	0	0	0	0	1	0
Nottingham Forest	2007–08	League One	2	0	0	0	0	0	0	0	2	0
Nottingham Forest	2008–09	Championship	12	0	0	0	0	0	—		12	0
Nottingham Forest	2009–10	Championship	0	0	0	0	0	0	—		0	0
Nottingham Forest	2010–11	Championship	6	0	0	0	0	0	2 (Note: Appearances in the Championship play-offs)	0	8	0
Nottingham Forest	2011–12	Championship	8	0	0	0	2	0	—		10	0
Nottingham Forest	2012–13	Championship	13	0	1	0	2	0	—		16	0
Nottingham Forest	Total		42	0	1	0	4	0	2	0	49	0
Chesterfield (loan)	2007–08	League Two	9	1	0	0	0	0	0	0	9	1
Rushden & Diamonds (loan)	2008–09	Conference Premier	4	0	0	0	—		0	0	4	0
Notts County (loan)	2009–10	League Two	18	1	0	0	1	0	0	0	19	1
Scunthorpe United (loan)	2009–10	Championship	3	0	0	0	0	0	—		3	0
Bristol City	2012–13	Championship	17	0	—		—		—		17	0
Bristol City	2013–14	League One	32	0	4	0	3	0	2 (Note: Appearance(s) in the Football League Trophy)	1	41	1
Bristol City	Total		49	0	4	0	3	0	2	1	58	1
Yeovil Town	2014–15	League One	5	0	1	0	0	0	1	0	7	0
Northampton Town	2014–15	League Two	22	1	—		—		—		22	1
Northampton Town	2015–16	League Two	25	1	4	0	0	0	0	0	29	1
Northampton Town	2016–17	League One	23	0	1	0	2	0	0	0	26	0
Northampton Town	2017–18	League One	34	0	0	0	0	0	4 (Note: Appearances in the EFL Trophy)	0	38	0
Northampton Town	Total		104	2	5	0	2	0	4	0	115	2
Career total			234	4	11	0	10	0	9	1	264	5

== Honours ==
Notts County

- Football League Two: 2009–10

Northampton Town

- Football League Two: 2015–16
