= 2011–12 Nottingham Forest F.C. season =

English football club season

Nottingham Forest
2011–12 season
- Chairman: Nigel Doughty (until 2 October); Frank Clark (from 13 October)
- Manager: Steve McClaren (until 2 October); Rob Kelly (caretaker); Steve Cotterill (from 17 October)
- Ground: City Ground
- Championship: 19th
- FA Cup: Third round
- League Cup: Third round
- Top goalscorer: League: Garath McCleary (9); All: Garath McCleary (9)
- Highest home attendance: 27,356 vs. Derby County (Championship, 17 September 2011)
- Lowest home attendance: 10,208 vs. Newcastle United (League Cup, 20 September 2011)
Home colours	Away colours

The 2011–12 season was Nottingham Forest Football Club's fourth consecutive season in the Championship. Nottingham Forest's expectations were to once again seek promotion from the Championship. However, the season was spent in a relegation battle which they survived meaning they would once again compete in the second tier. Forest also competed in the FA Cup and the League Cup, being knocked out in the third round of both.

== Key events ==
- 12 June 2011: Billy Davies's contract was terminated with the club.
- 13 June 2011: Steve McClaren became the new Nottingham Forest manager.
- 14 June 2011: Young players Nialle Rodney and Mark Byrne were released from their contracts, with Byrne joining Barnet, and Rodney going to Bradford City.
- 16 June 2011: Forest were drawn against local rivals Notts County in the first round of the League Cup. Assistant manager David Kelly, first team coach Julian Darby, assistant first team coach Chris Fairclough, performance coach Darren Robinson and goalkeeping coach Pete Williams all left Forest.
- 1 July 2011: Dele Adebola joined Hull City after his contract expired, and it was confirmed Kelvin Wilson and Nathan Tyson joined Celtic and Derby County respectively. Paul McKenna was also released from his contract so he could join Hull City.
- 2 July 2011: Forest made their first signing of the season with Andy Reid joining for free from Blackpool.
- 5 July 2011: Julian Bennett joined Sheffield Wednesday after his contract expired.
- 6 July 2011: Robert Earnshaw joined Cardiff City, his hometown club, after his contract expired.
- 18 July 2011: Fulham midfielder Jonathan Greening signed a three-year deal at Forest. The fee was £600,000.
- 19 July 2011: Guy Moussi signs a new contract, keeping him at Forest until 2014.
- 20 July 2011: Midfielder George Boateng signed a one-year contract deal at Forest on a free transfer.
- 29 July 2011: Forest appointed Rob Kelly to the post of assistant manager, while also confirming the appointments of Jimmy Floyd Hasselbaink, Bill Bestwick, Paul Barron and Alessandro Schoenmaker.
- 10 August 2011: Striker Matt Derbyshire signed from Olympiacos for an undisclosed fee.
- 15 August 2011: Ishmael Miller was signed by Forest on a three-year deal for £1.2m from Premier League side West Bromwich Albion.
- 31 August 2011: Striker Joe Garner joined Watford for an undisclosed fee.
- 9 September 2011: Young goalkeeper Ben Gathercole joined Ilkeston on loan for a month and it was announced that Karlton Watson has joined Eastwood Town for month on loan.
- 15 September 2011: Striker David McGoldrick went on loan to Sheffield Wednesday for a month.
- 22 September 2011: Forest signed Clint Hill on an emergency loan from Queens Park Rangers.
- 2 October 2011: Manager Steve McClaren resigned from the club.
- 2 October 2011: Nigel Doughty announced his resignation as Chairman after 10 years at the club.
- 13 October 2011: Frank Clark was announced as the new Chairman of Nottingham Forest.
- 17 October 2011: Steve Cotterill was confirmed as the new manager of Forest.
- 25 October 2011: Forest signed Greg Cunningham from Manchester City on an emergency loan.
- 4 November 2011: Youngster Kieron Freeman joined Mansfield Town on an emergency loan.
- 1 January 2012: Marlon Harewood returned to Forest from Guangzhou R&F and signed a four-month contract until the end of the season.
- 30 January 2012: Wes Morgan left Forest and signed for Leicester City, for an undisclosed fee.
- 30 January 2012: Adlène Guedioura signed for Forest on loan for the remainder of the season, from Wolverhampton Wanderers.
- 31 January 2012: Young player Patrick Bamford signed for Chelsea for an undisclosed fee.
- 31 January 2012: Forest made two deadline day loan signings, with Danny Higginbotham coming from Stoke City and Scott Wootton from Manchester United. Both signed for the remainder of the season
- 4 February 2012: Nottingham Forest Owner Nigel Doughty died at his home in Lincolnshire
- 9 February 2012: Forest signed George Elokobi on loan from Wolverhampton Wanderers for the remainder of the season

== Players ==
=== Squad information ===
N	Pos.	Nat.	Name	Age	EU	Since	App	Goals	Ends	Transfer fee	Previous Club	Notes
1	GK	(Northern Ireland)	Lee Camp	27	EU	2009	115	0	2013	£100,000	(England) Queens Park Rangers	
2	DF	(England)	Scott Wootton	20	EU	2012 (Winter)	0	0	2012	Loan	(England) Manchester United	On loan from Manchester United
3	DF	(Republic of Ireland)	Greg Cunningham	21	EU	2011	0	0	2012	Loan	(England) Manchester City	On loan from Manchester City
4	DF	(England)	Luke Chambers (C)	26	EU	2007 (Winter)	182	19	2012	Undisclosed	(England) Northampton Town	
5	DF	(England)	Wes Morgan	28	EU	2003	352	12	Undisclosed	Youth system	(England) Youth Academy	
5	DF	(England)	Danny Higginbotham	33	EU	2012 (Winter)	0	0	2012	Loan	(England) Stoke City	On loan from Stoke City
6	MF	(Netherlands)	George Boateng	36	EU	2011	0	0	2012	Free	(Greece) Skoda Xanthi	
7	MF	(England)	Paul Anderson	23	EU	2009	111	11	2012	£250,000	(England) Liverpool	
8	FW	(England)	Matt Derbyshire	26	EU	2011	0	0	2014	Undisclosed	(Greece) Olympiacos	
9	FW	(England)	Ishmael Miller	25	EU	2011	0	0	2014	£1,200,000	(England) West Bromwich Albion	
10	MF	(England)	Lewis McGugan	23	EU	2006	155	31	Undisclosed	Youth system	(England) Youth Academy	
11	MF	(Republic of Ireland)	Andy Reid	29	EU	2011	160	25	2013	Free	(England) Blackpool	
12	MF	(England)	Garath McCleary	25	EU	2008 (Winter)	100	4	2012	Undisclosed	(England) Bromley	
14	MF	(England)	Jonathan Greening	33	EU	2011	0	0	2014	£600,000	(England) Fulham	
15	MF	(England)	Chris Cohen	25	EU	2007	189	12	2013	Undisclosed	(England) Yeovil Town	
16	DF	(Wales)	Chris Gunter	22	EU	2009	105	1	2014	£1,750,000	(England) Tottenham Hotspur	
17	FW	(England)	David McGoldrick	24	EU	2009	62	9	2013	£1,000,000	(England) Southampton	
18	FW	(England)	Marlon Harewood	32	EU	2012 (Winter)	204	56	2012	Free	(China) Guangzhou R&F	
19	MF	(France)	Guy Moussi	27	EU	2008	79	3	2014	Undisclosed	(France) Angers SCO	
20	FW	(England)	Marcus Tudgay	25	EU	2011 (Winter)	24	7	2013	£500,000	(England) Sheffield Wednesday	
21	GK	(England)	Paul Smith	32	EU	2006	140	1	2012	£500,000	(England) Southampton	
22	MF	(Algeria)	Adlène Guedioura	26	EU	2012 (Winter)	0	0	2012	Loan	(England) Wolverhampton Wanderers	On loan from Wolverhampton Wanderers
23	FW	(Antigua and Barbuda)	Dexter Blackstock	26	EU	2009	69	21	2013	Undisclosed	(England) Queens Park Rangers	
24	FW	(United States)	Robbie Findley	26	Non-EU	2011 (Winter)	2	0	2013	Free	(United States) Real Salt Lake	
26	DF	(Cameroon)	George Elokobi	26	EU	2012 (Winter)	0	0	2012	Loan	(England) Wolverhampton Wanderers	On loan from Wolverhampton Wanderers
27	DF	(Republic of Ireland)	Brendan Moloney	23	EU	2006	23	0	2013	Youth system	(England) Youth Academy	
28	MF	(Poland)	Radosław Majewski	25	EU	2010	68	6	2013	£1,000,000	(Poland) Polonia Warszawa	
32	MF	(England)	Danny Meadows	20	EU	2011	0	0	Undisclosed	Youth system	(England) Youth Academy	
33	DF	(England)	Joel Lynch	24	EU	2009	51	0	2012	£200,000	(England) Brighton & Hove Albion	
38	GK	(England)	Karl Darlow	21	EU	2008	1	0	2013	Youth system	(England) Youth Academy	
40	FW	(England)	Patrick Bamford	18	EU	2011	2	0	Undisclosed	Youth system	(England) Youth Academy	
41	DF	(Wales)	Kieron Freeman	20	EU	2010	0	0	2013	Youth system	(England) Youth Academy	
44	DF	(England)	Jamaal Lascelles	18	EU	2011	0	0	Undisclosed	Youth system	(England) Youth Academy	

- Last updated: 12 May 2012
- Source: Nottingham Forest F.C. and soccerbase.com

=== Transfers in ===
#	Pos	Player	From	Fee	Date	Source
11	MF	(Republic of Ireland) Andy Reid	(England) Blackpool	Free	1 July 2011	
14	MF	(England) Jonathan Greening	(England) Fulham	£616,000	18 July 2011	
6	MF	(Netherlands) George Boateng	(Greece) Skoda Xanthi	Free	20 July 2011	
8	FW	(England) Matt Derbyshire	(Greece) Olympiacos	Free^{1}	10 August 2011	
9	FW	(England) Ishmael Miller	(England) West Bromwich Albion	£1,188,000	15 August 2011	
18	FW	(England) Marlon Harewood	(China) Guangzhou R&F	Free	1 January 2012	

=== Transfers out ===
#	Pos	Player	To	Fee	Date
	FW	(England) Nialle Rodney	(England) Bradford City	Released	14 June 2011
	MF	(Republic of Ireland) Mark Byrne	(England) Barnet	Released	14 June 2011
	DF	(England) Kelvin Wilson	(Scotland) Celtic	Free	1 July 2011
	FW	(England) Nathan Tyson	(England) Derby County	Free	1 July 2011
	MF	(England) Paul McKenna	(England) Hull City	Released	1 July 2011
	FW	(Nigeria) Dele Adebola	(England) Hull City	Free	1 July 2011
	DF	(England) Julian Bennett	(England) Sheffield Wednesday	Free	5 July 2011
	FW	(Wales) Robert Earnshaw	(Wales) Cardiff City	Free	6 July 2011
18	FW	(England) Joe Garner	(England) Watford	£200,000^{1}	31 August 2011
30	DF	(England) Karlton Watson	(England) Lincoln City	Released	23 December 2011
31	DF	(Republic of Ireland) Neill Byrne	(England) Rochdale	Released	23 December 2011
5	DF	(England) Wes Morgan	(England) Leicester City	£990,000^{1}	30 January 2012
40	FW	(England) Patrick Bamford	(England) Chelsea	£1,584,000^{1}	31 January 2012

^{1}Fee was officially reported as Undisclosed.

=== Loans in ===
#	Pos	Player	From	Start	End
3	DF	(England) Clint Hill	(England) Queens Park Rangers	22 September 2011	21 October 2011
3	DF	(Republic of Ireland) Greg Cunningham	(England) Manchester City	25 October 2011	30 June 2012
22	MF	(Algeria) Adlène Guedioura	(England) Wolverhampton Wanderers	30 January 2012	30 June 2012
5	DF	(England) Danny Higginbotham	(England) Stoke City	31 January 2012	30 June 2012
2	DF	(England) Scott Wootton	(England) Manchester United	31 January 2012	30 June 2012
26	DF	(Cameroon) George Elokobi	(England) Wolverhampton Wanderers	9 February 2012	30 June 2012

=== Loans out ===
#	Pos	Player	To	Start	End
30	DF	(England) Karlton Watson	(England) Eastwood Town	2 September 2011	2 October 2011
	GK	(England) Ben Gathercole	(England) Ilkeston	9 September 2011	30 November 2011
17	FW	(England) David McGoldrick	(England) Sheffield Wednesday	15 September 2011	15 October 2011
	GK	(Bulgaria) Dimitar Evtimov	(England) Ilkeston	23 September 2011	10 October 2011
41	DF	(Wales) Kieron Freeman	(England) Mansfield Town	4 November 2011	4 December 2011
	GK	(Bulgaria) Dimitar Evtimov	(England) Gainsborough Trinity	9 November 2011	9 December 2011
41	DF	(Wales) Kieron Freeman	(England) Notts County	13 January 2012	13 February 2012
38	GK	(England) Karl Darlow	(Wales) Newport County	9 March 2012	9 April 2012
44	DF	(England) Jamaal Lascelles	(England) Stevenage	9 March 2012	31 May 2012
32	MF	(England) Danny Meadows	(England) Alfreton Town	22 March 2012	31 May 2012

== Squad statistics ==
=== Appearances and goals ===
This is a list of the First Team players from the 2011–12 season.

As of 12 May 2012

No.	Pos	Nat	Player	Total		Championship		FA Cup		League Cup	
No.	Pos	Nat	Player	Apps	Goals	Apps	Goals	Apps	Goals	Apps	Goals
1	GK	(Northern Ireland) NIR	Lee Camp	50	0	46+0	0	2+0	0	2+0	0
2	DF	(England) ENG	Scott Wootton	13	0	7+6	0	0+0	0	0+0	0
3	DF	(England) ENG	Clint Hill	5	0	5+0	0	0+0	0	0+0	0
3	DF	(Republic of Ireland) IRL	Greg Cunningham	28	0	25+2	0	1+0	0	0+0	0
4	DF	(England) ENG	Luke Chambers	46	0	43+0	0	1+0	0	2+0	0
5	DF	(England) ENG	Wes Morgan	25	2	22+0	1	0+0	0	3+0	1
5	DF	(England) ENG	Danny Higginbotham	6	1	5+1	1	0+0	0	0+0	0
6	MF	(Netherlands) NED	George Boateng	7	1	5+0	1	1+0	0	0+1	0
7	MF	(England) ENG	Paul Anderson	20	0	10+7	0	1+1	0	1+0	0
8	FW	(England) ENG	Matt Derbyshire	16	2	7+8	1	0+0	0	1+0	1
9	FW	(England) ENG	Ishmael Miller	23	4	13+8	3	0+0	0	1+1	1
10	MF	(England) ENG	Lewis McGugan	40	5	27+8	3	1+1	0	3+0	2
11	MF	(Republic of Ireland) IRL	Andy Reid	43	2	22+17	2	2+0	0	1+1	0
12	MF	(England) ENG	Garath McCleary	23	9	21+1	9	1+0	0	0+0	0
14	MF	(England) ENG	Jonathan Greening	36	0	24+7	0	2+0	0	3+0	0
15	MF	(England) ENG	Chris Cohen	9	0	7+0	0	0+0	0	2+0	0
16	DF	(Wales) WAL	Chris Gunter	50	1	44+2	1	2+0	0	2+0	0
17	FW	(England) ENG	David McGoldrick	10	0	3+6	0	0+1	0	0+0	0
18	FW	(England) ENG	Joe Garner	4	0	1+1	0	0+0	0	0+2	0
18	FW	(England) ENG	Marlon Harewood	6	0	4+0	0	1+1	0	0+0	0
19	MF	(France) FRA	Guy Moussi	37	0	33+1	0	2+0	0	1+0	0
20	FW	(England) ENG	Marcus Tudgay	38	6	24+10	5	1+0	0	1+2	1
21	GK	(England) ENG	Paul Smith	1	0	0+0	0	0+0	0	1+0	0
22	MF	(Algeria) ALG	Adlène Guedioura	19	1	19+0	1	0+0	0	0+0	0
23	FW	(Antigua and Barbuda) ANT	Dexter Blackstock	24	8	16+6	8	0+2	0	0+0	0
24	FW	(United States) USA	Robbie Findley	27	6	10+13	3	1+0	0	3+0	3
26	DF	(Cameroon) CMR	George Elokobi	12	0	8+4	0	0+0	0	0+0	0
27	DF	(Republic of Ireland) IRL	Brendan Moloney	10	0	3+5	0	0+0	0	2+0	0
28	MF	(Poland) POL	Radosław Majewski	31	7	23+5	6	0+0	0	2+1	1
33	DF	(England) ENG	Joel Lynch	39	3	28+7	3	2+0	0	2+0	0
40	FW	(England) ENG	Patrick Bamford	2	0	0+2	0	0+0	0	0+0	0
41	DF	(Wales) WAL	Kieron Freeman	2	0	0+0	0	1+0	0	0+1	0
44	DF	(England) ENG	Jamaal Lascelles	1	0	1+0	0	0+0	0	0+0	0

=== Top scorers ===
Includes all competitive matches. The list is sorted by league goals when total goals are equal.

Last updated on 12 May 2012

Position	Nation	Number	Name	Championship	FA Cup	League Cup	Total
1	(England)	12	Garath McCleary	9	0	0	9
2	(Antigua and Barbuda)	23	Dexter Blackstock	8	0	0	8
3	(Poland)	28	Radosław Majewski	6	0	1	7
4	(England)	20	Marcus Tudgay	5	0	1	6
=	(United States)	24	Robbie Findley	3	0	3	6
6	(England)	10	Lewis McGugan	3	0	2	5
7	(England)	9	Ishmael Miller	3	0	1	4
8	(England)	33	Joel Lynch	3	0	0	3
9	(England)	5	Wes Morgan	1	0	1	2
=	(Republic of Ireland)	11	Andy Reid	2	0	0	2
=	(England)	8	Matt Derbyshire	1	0	1	2
12	(England)	5	Danny Higginbotham	1	0	0	1
=	(Netherlands)	6	George Boateng	1	0	0	1
=	(Wales)	16	Chris Gunter	1	0	0	1
=	(Algeria)	22	Adlène Guedioura	1	0	0	1
			Totals	48	0	10	58

=== Disciplinary record ===
Includes all competitive matches. Players with one card or more included only.

Last updated on 12 May 2012

Position	Nation	Number	Name	Championship			FA Cup			League Cup			Total		
Position	Nation	Number	Name	Y	YY	R	Y	YY	R	Y	YY	R	Y	YY	R
GK	(Northern Ireland)	1	Lee Camp	2	0	0	0	0	0	0	0	0	2	0	0
DF	(England)	2	Scott Wootton	3	0	0	0	0	0	0	0	0	3	0	0
DF	(Republic of Ireland)	3	Greg Cunningham	4	0	0	0	0	0	0	0	0	4	0	0
DF	(England)	4	Luke Chambers	4	0	1	0	0	0	0	0	0	4	0	1
DF	(England)	5	Wes Morgan	2	0	0	0	0	0	1	0	0	3	0	0
MF	(Netherlands)	6	George Boateng	2	0	0	0	0	0	0	0	0	2	0	0
FW	(England)	8	Matt Derbyshire	3	0	0	0	0	0	0	0	0	3	0	0
FW	(England)	9	Ishmael Miller	3	0	0	0	0	0	0	0	0	3	0	0
MF	(England)	10	Lewis McGugan	2	0	0	0	0	0	0	0	0	2	0	0
MF	(Republic of Ireland)	11	Andy Reid	3	1	0	1	0	0	0	0	0	4	1	0
MF	(England)	12	Garath McCleary	2	0	1	0	0	0	0	0	0	2	0	1
MF	(England)	14	Jonathan Greening	2	0	0	0	0	0	0	0	0	2	0	0
MF	(England)	15	Chris Cohen	0	0	0	0	0	0	1	0	0	1	0	0
DF	(Wales)	16	Chris Gunter	7	0	0	0	0	0	0	0	0	7	0	0
MF	(France)	19	Guy Moussi	7	1	0	0	0	0	0	0	0	7	1	0
FW	(England)	20	Marcus Tudgay	2	1	0	0	0	0	1	0	0	3	1	0
MF	(Algeria)	22	Adlène Guedioura	2	0	0	0	0	0	0	0	0	2	0	0
FW	(Antigua and Barbuda)	23	Dexter Blackstock	2	0	0	0	0	0	0	0	0	2	0	0
DF	(Cameroon)	26	George Elokobi	1	0	0	0	0	0	0	0	0	1	0	0
DF	(England)	33	Joel Lynch	7	0	0	0	0	0	0	0	0	7	0	0
			Totals	60	3	2	1	0	0	3	0	0	64	3	1

== Club ==
=== Coaching staff ===
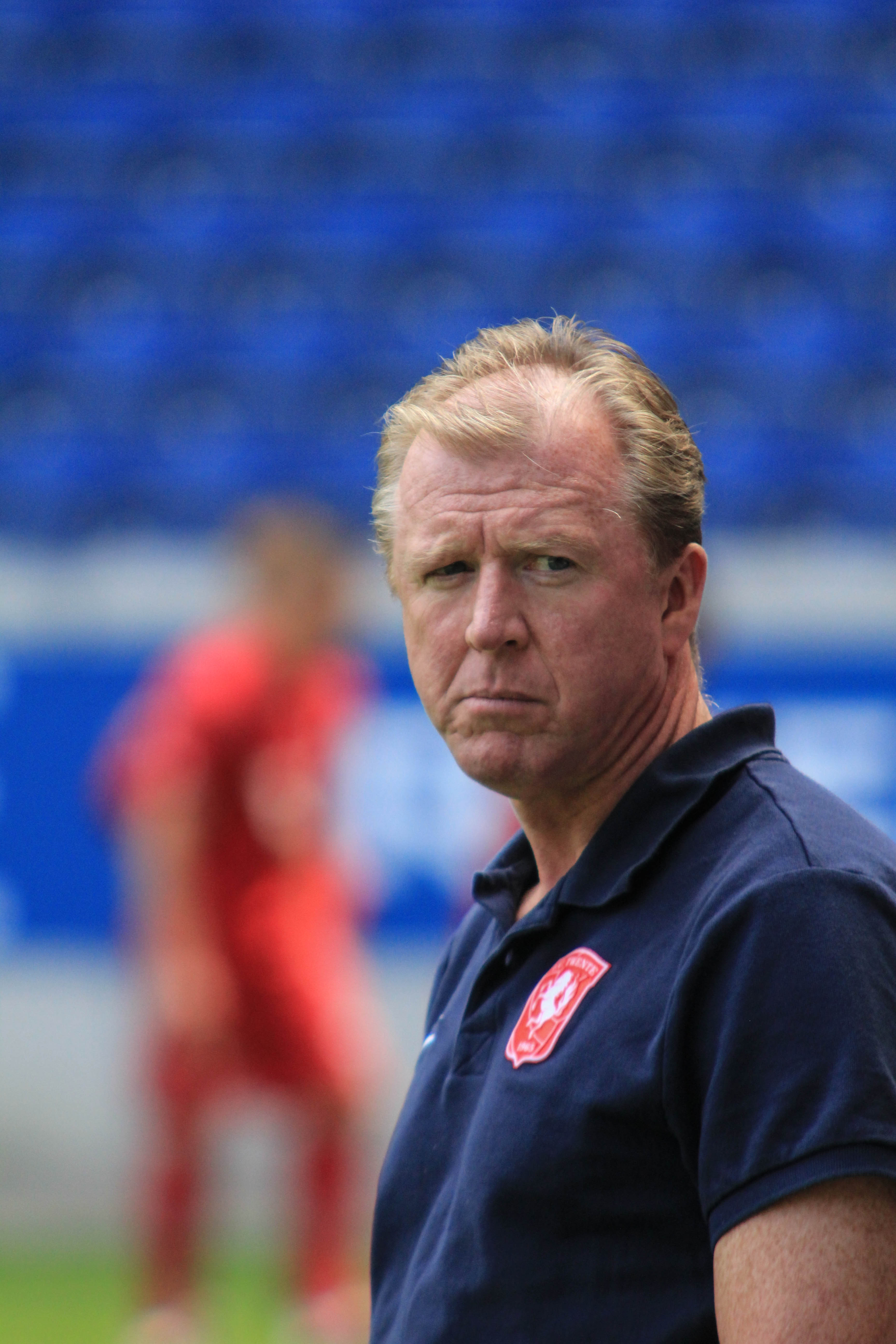
Steve McClaren was in charge for 112 days at Nottingham Forest.

Position	Staff
Manager (until 2 October)	(England) Steve McClaren
Manager (from 17 October)	(England) Steve Cotterill
Assistant Manager	(England) Rob Kelly
First Team Coach	(Netherlands) Jimmy Floyd Hasselbaink
First Team Coach (from 19 January)	(Republic of Ireland) Sean O'Driscoll
Goalkeeping Coach	(England) Paul Barron
Fitness Coach	(Brazil) Alessandro Schoenmaker
Head Physiotherapist	(England) Andrew Balderston
Medical Consultant	(Republic of Ireland) Dr Frank Coffey
Director of Recruitment and Scouting	(England) Keith Burt

Last updated: 23 January 2012
Source: Nottingham Forest F.C.

=== Kit ===
The kits shown here are those of the 2011–12 season. The Home and Goalkeeper Home kits were worn for the first time in the first home game, against Barnsley. The Away Alternative is a combination of the Away shirt, Home shorts and last season's Away socks, and was worn in the away match at Doncaster Rovers. The Away kit was debuted at Southampton away and the Goalkeeper away at Wycombe Wanderers away in the League Cup. All the kits had the same Umbro and Victor Chandler logos across the front of them.

Supplier: Umbro
Sponsor(s): Victor Chandler

Home	Home alt	Away	Away Alt	GK Home	GK Away

Last updated: 6 November 2011.
Source: Nottingham Forest F.C. Online Store

=== Other information ===
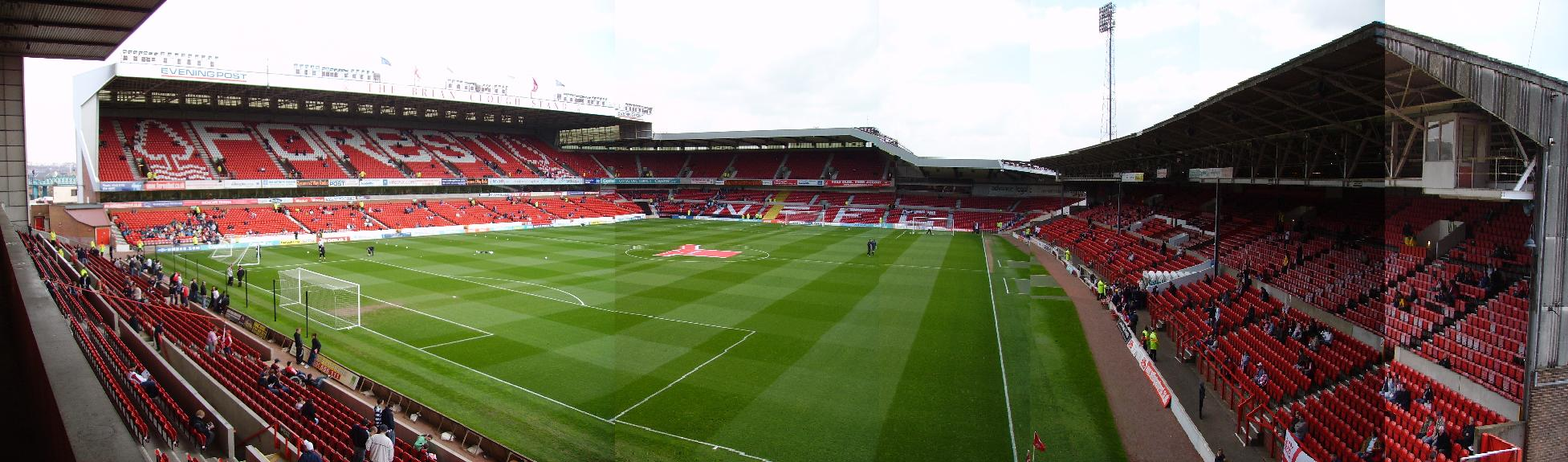
The City Ground is the eighth largest stadium in the Championship.

Chairman (until 2 October)	(England) Nigel Doughty
Chairman (from 13 October)	(England) Frank Clark
Chief Executive	(England) Mark Arthur
Director of Finance	(England) John Pelling
Ground (capacity and dimensions)	City Ground (30,576 / 115x78 meters)

Updated to match played 6 November 2011
Source: Nottingham Forest F.C.

== Competitions ==
=== Overall ===
Competition	Started round	Current position / round	Final position / round	First match	Last match
2011–12 Football League Championship	—	20th	19th	13 August	28 April
2011-12 Football League Cup	1st Round	—	3rd Round	9 August	20 September
FA Cup	3rd round	—	3rd round	7 January	17 January

Updated to match played 28 April 2012
Source: Competitions

=== Championship ===
==== Table ====
Pos	Team	Pld	W	D	L	GF	GA	GD	Pts
17	Crystal Palace	46	13	17	16	46	51	−5	56
18	Peterborough United	46	13	11	22	67	77	−10	50
19	Nottingham Forest	46	14	8	24	48	63	−15	50
20	Bristol City	46	12	13	21	44	68	−24	49
21	Barnsley	46	13	9	24	49	74	−25	48

Updated to match(es) played on 28 April 2012. Source: BBC Sport
Rules for classification: 1) points; 2) goal difference; 3) number of goals scored.

==== Results summary ====
Overall								Home						Away					
Pld	W	D	L	GF	GA	GD	Pts	W	D	L	GF	GA	GD	W	D	L	GF	GA	GD
46	14	8	24	48	63	−15	50	6	5	12	21	32	−11	8	3	12	27	31	−4

Last updated: 28 April 2012.
Source: Football League

==== Results by round ====
Round	1	2	3	4	5	6	7	8	9	10	11	12	13	14	15	16	17	18	19	20	21	22	23	24	25	26	27	28	29	30	31	32	33	34	35	36	37	38	39	40	41	42	43	44	45	46
Ground	H	A	A	H	H	A	H	A	A	H	A	H	A	H	H	A	H	A	H	A	H	A	H	H	A	H	A	H	H	A	H	A	A	H	H	A	A	H	A	A	H	A	H	A	A	H
Result	D	L	W	D	L	L	L	W	L	L	L	W	W	L	W	L	W	L	L	L	L	D	L	L	W	L	L	L	D	L	W	W	D	L	W	L	W	D	D	W	L	W	D	L	L	W
Position	15	20	13	12	18	21	22	18	20	21	23	20	19	20	19	20	17	20	22	22	22	22	22	22	22	22	22	23	22	23	21	20	20	21	20	20	19	19	19	19	19	19	19	19	20	19

Updated to match(es) played on 28 April 2012. Source: competitive matches
A = Away; H = Home; W = Win; D = Draw; L = Loss

== Matches ==
=== Competitive ===
==== Championship ====
6 August 2011 1	Nottingham Forest	0–0	Barnsley	Nottingham
15:00 BST	Morgan (yellow card) 36'	Report	(yellow card) 7' McEveley; (yellow card) 26' Edwards	Stadium: City Ground; Attendance: 22,951; Referee: A. Haines

13 August 2011 2	Millwall	2–0	Nottingham Forest	Bermondsey, London
15:00 BST	Henderson 7'; Robinson (yellow card) 24'; Marquis (yellow card) 45+1'; Bouazza (yellow card) 63'; Trotter 77'	Report	(yellow card) 23' Boateng	Stadium: The Den; Attendance: 12,010; Referee: G. Scott

16 August 2011 3	Doncaster Rovers	0–1	Nottingham Forest	Doncaster
19:45 BST	Hird (yellow card) 70'	Report	31' Gunter	Stadium: Keepmoat Stadium; Attendance: 9,464; Referee: A. Woolmer

20 August 2011 4	Nottingham Forest	2–2	Leicester City	Nottingham
15:00 BST	McGugan 79' (pen.); Boateng 90+4'	Report	18' Nugent; 21' Fernandes; (yellow card) 51' Wellens; (yellow card) 78' Mills; (yellow card) 78' (red card) 79' Schmeichel	Stadium: City Ground; Attendance: 24,426; Referee: J. Moss

28 August 2011 5	Nottingham Forest	1–4	West Ham United	Nottingham
13:15 BST	Boateng (yellow card) 38'; Findley 70'; A. Reid (yellow card) 89'	Report	21' (o.g.) Chambers; 25', (yellow card) 72' Nolan; 32' Cole; 77' W. Reid; (yellow card) 89' Faubert	Stadium: City Ground; Attendance: 21,379; Referee: G. Salisbury

10 September 2011 6	Southampton	3–2	Nottingham Forest	Southampton
15:00 BST	Lambert 9', 25', 83', (yellow card) 84'; Connolly (yellow card) 34'; Cork (yellow card) 51'	Report	7', (yellow card) 81' Derbyshire; (yellow card) 26' Moussi; (yellow card) 34' Gunter; 43' Majewski; (yellow card) 90+4' Lynch	Stadium: St Mary's Stadium; Attendance: 24,784; Referee: I. Williamson

17 September 2011 7	Nottingham Forest	1–2	Derby County	Nottingham
13:00 BST	Reid 5' (pen.); Gunter (yellow card) 10'; Lynch (yellow card) 45'; Miller (yellow card) 53'	Report	(red card) 2' Fielding; 29' Ward; (yellow card) 45' Brayford; 72' Hendrick	Stadium: City Ground; Attendance: 27,356; Referee: S. Mathieson

24 September 2011 8	Watford	0–1	Nottingham Forest	Watford
17:15 BST		Report	61' Miller; (yellow card) 75' Moussi	Stadium: Vicarage Road; Attendance: 11,437; Referee: R. Madley

27 September 2011 9	Burnley	5–1	Nottingham Forest	Burnley
19:45 BST	Rodriguez 5', 15'; McCann 29'; Wallace 44'; Austin 71'	Report	59' Miller; (yellow card) 85' Chambers	Stadium: Turf Moor; Attendance: 13,265; Referee: Ilderton

2 October 2011 10	Nottingham Forest	1–3	Birmingham City	Nottingham
15:00 BST	Miller 35'	Report	(yellow card) 66' Ridgewell; 75' Burke; 79', 88' Wood	Stadium: City Ground; Attendance: 20,556; Referee: Haywood

15 October 2011 11	Coventry City	1–0	Nottingham Forest	Coventry
15:00 BST	Jutkiewicz 57'	Report	(yellow card) 65' Miller	Stadium: Ricoh Arena; Attendance: 15,712; Referee: Graham

18 October 2011 12	Nottingham Forest	2–0	Middlesbrough	Nottingham
19:45 BST	Tudgay 35'; McGugan 55'; Moussi (yellow card) 62'	Report	(yellow card) 62' Robson; (yellow card) 66' Martin	Stadium: City Ground; Attendance: 20,630; Referee: Wright

22 October 2011 13	Blackpool	1–2	Nottingham Forest	Blackpool
15:00 BST	Phillips 43'	Report	39' Morgan; (yellow card) 65' Derbyshire; (yellow card) 67' Gunter; 76' Majewski; (yellow card) 77' (red card) 88' Moussi	Stadium: Bloomfield Road; Attendance: 13,520; Referee: Waugh

29 October 2011 14	Nottingham Forest	0–1	Hull City	Nottingham
15:00 BST	Gunter (yellow card) 31'	Report	(yellow card) 31', (goal) 75' McLean; (yellow card) 68' Chester; (yellow card) 68' Rosenior; (yellow card) 90+5' Fryatt	Stadium: City Ground; Attendance: 22,841; Referee: K Stroud

1 November 2011 15	Nottingham Forest	1–0	Reading	Nottingham
19:45 GMT	Tudgay 75'	Report	(yellow card) 68' Le Fondre; (yellow card) 79' Cummings	Stadium: City Ground; Attendance: 18,506; Referee: D Webb

5 November 2011 16	Portsmouth	3–0	Nottingham Forest	Portsmouth
15:00 GMT	Huseklepp 45', 85'; Kitson 76'	Report	(yellow card) 3' Tudgay; (yellow card) 46' Lynch	Stadium: Fratton Park; Attendance: 14,207; Referee: T. Bates

19 November 2011 17	Nottingham Forest	3–2	Ipswich Town	Nottingham
15:00 GMT	Findley 42'; Cunningham (yellow card) 65'; Lynch 84'; Tudgay 90+1'	Report	25', 62' Collins	Stadium: City Ground; Attendance: 21,143; Referee: J. Linington

26 November 2011 18	Cardiff City	1–0	Nottingham Forest	Cardiff
15:00 GMT	Mason 70'; Whittingham (yellow card) 74'	Report	(yellow card) 21' Moussi; (yellow card) 53' McGugan	Stadium: Cardiff City Stadium; Attendance: 22,556; Referee: D. Phillips

29 November 2011 19	Nottingham Forest	0–4	Leeds United	Nottingham
19:45 GMT	Lynch (yellow card) 51'; Reid (yellow card) 64' (red card) 79'; Morgan (yellow card) 68'	Report	20' Snodgrass; 45' Howson; 49' Becchio; 66' Clayton	Stadium: City Ground; Attendance: 23,577; Referee: D. Deadman

3 December 2011 20	Brighton & Hove Albion	1–0	Nottingham Forest	Brighton and Hove
15:00 GMT	Dunk (yellow card) 89'; Buckley 90+2'	Report	(yellow card) 66' Tudgay	Stadium: Falmer Stadium; Attendance: 20,385; Referee: D. Drysdale

10 December 2011 21	Nottingham Forest	0–1	Crystal Palace	Nottingham
15:00 GMT	Cunningham (yellow card) 55'; Greening (yellow card) 55'; Moussi (yellow card) 71'; Blackstock (yellow card) 90+4'	Report	(yellow card) 37' Jedinak; (yellow card) 55' Zaha; 56', (yellow card) 69' Murray	Stadium: City Ground; Attendance: 21,405; Referee: P. Gibbs

17 December 2011 22	Bristol City	0–0	Nottingham Forest	Bristol
15:00 GMT	Skuse (yellow card) 20'; Pearson (yellow card) 25'	Report		Stadium: Ashton Gate; Attendance: 13,121; Referee: B. Malone

26 December 2011 23	Nottingham Forest	0–1	Peterborough United	Nottingham
15:00 GMT	McGugan (yellow card) 34'	Report	20' Boyd; (yellow card) 63' Sinclair	Stadium: City Ground; Attendance: 24,376; Referee: O. Langford

31 December 2011 24	Nottingham Forest	0–1	Cardiff City	Nottingham
15:00 GMT	Lynch (yellow card) 43'; Greening (yellow card) 72'	Report	(yellow card) 1' Marshall; 59' Miller; (yellow card) 61' Hudson	Stadium: City Ground; Attendance: 19,750; Referee: A. Woolmer

2 January 2012 25	Ipswich Town	1–3	Nottingham Forest	Ipswich
15:00 GMT	Leadbitter 75' (pen.), (yellow card) 90+2'	Report	5', 78' Tudgay; 26' McCleary	Stadium: Portman Road; Attendance: 18,964; Referee: C. Boyeson

14 January 2012 26	Nottingham Forest	0–3	Southampton	Nottingham
15:00 GMT	Chambers (red card) 49'	Report	(yellow card) 25' Hooiveld; 27' do Prado; 66' Connolly; 79' Schneirderlin	Stadium: City Ground; Attendance: 20,221; Referee: E. Ilderton

21 January 2012 27	West Ham United	2–1	Nottingham Forest	Upton Park, London
15:00 GMT	Cole (yellow card) 8'; Noble 45+3' (pen.), 63' (pen.)	Report	(yellow card) 85' Gunter; 90+3' McGugan	Stadium: Boleyn Ground; Attendance: 31,718; Referee: Tony Bates

31 January 2012 28	Nottingham Forest	0–2	Burnley	Nottingham
19:45 GMT		Report	2', 64' Rodriguez	Stadium: City Ground; Attendance: 23,147; Referee: M. Naylor

11 February 2012 29	Nottingham Forest	1–1	Watford	Nottingham
15:00 GMT	McCleary 19'; Gunter (yellow card) 66'; Miller (yellow card) 73'	Report	(yellow card) 12' Doyley; 44' Deeney; (yellow card) 52' Hogg; (yellow card) 56' Nosworthy; (yellow card) 69' Garner	Stadium: City Ground; Attendance: 21,712; Referee: J. Moss

14 February 2012 30	Middlesbrough	2–1	Nottingham Forest	Middlesbrough
19:45 GMT	Emnes 45'; Jutkiewicz 46'; Bennett (yellow card) 65'; Thomson (yellow card) 67' (red card) 74'	Report	66' Lynch; (yellow card) 87' Gunter; (yellow card) 88' Chambers	Stadium: Riverside Stadium; Attendance: 14,799; Referee: Paul Tierney

18 February 2012 31	Nottingham Forest	2–0	Coventry City	Nottingham
15:00 GMT	McCleary 74'; Findley 86'	Report		Stadium: City Ground; Attendance: 21,588; Referee: M. Clattenburg

25 February 2012 32	Birmingham City	1–2	Nottingham Forest	Birmingham
15:00 GMT	Burke 55'	Report	29', 63' Blackstock; (yellow card) 87' Chambers	Stadium: St Andrew's; Attendance: 19,166; Referee: Roger East

3 March 2012 33	Barnsley	1–1	Nottingham Forest	Barnsley
15:00 GMT	McEveley (yellow card) 19'; Davies 79'; Dawson (yellow card) 85'	Report	33', (yellow card) 69' McCleary; (yellow card) 41' Elokobi	Stadium: Oakwell; Attendance: 10,550; Referee: D. Deadman

6 March 2012 34	Nottingham Forest	1–2	Doncaster Rovers	Nottingham
19:45 GMT	Blackstock 63'	Report	(yellow card) 32', (goal) 44' Piquionne; (yellow card) 37' Chimbonda; 47' Bennett; (yellow card) 76' Habib Beye	Stadium: City Ground; Attendance: 18,521; Referee: M. Jones

10 March 2012 35	Nottingham Forest	3–1	Millwall	Nottingham
15:00 GMT	McCleary 25'; Higginbotham 38'; Cunningham (yellow card) 45'; Reid 80'	Report	(yellow card) 32' Henry; 64', (yellow card) 75' Henderson	Stadium: City Ground; Attendance: 19,413; Referee: C. Pawson

13 March 2012 36	Derby County	1–0	Nottingham Forest	Derby
19:45 GMT	Davies (yellow card) 11'; Buxton 90+4'; Roberts (yellow card) 90+7'	Report	(yellow card) 14' Guedioura; (yellow card) 19' Moussi; (yellow card) 64' (red card) 90' Tudgay; (yellow card) 64' Blackstock	Stadium: Pride Park; Attendance: 33,010; Referee: A. D'Urso

20 March 2012 37	Leeds United	3–7	Nottingham Forest	Leeds
19:45 GMT	Snodgrass 6' (pen.); Robinson (yellow card) 30'; Becchio 53'; Brown 55'	Report	8' Guedioura; 45+2', 56', 60', 70' McCleary; 52', 81' Blackstock; A. Reid (yellow card) 68'	Stadium: Elland Road; Attendance: 21,367; Referee: E. Ilderton

24 March 2012 38	Nottingham Forest	1–1	Brighton & Hove Albion	Nottingham
15:00 GMT	Chambers (yellow card) 53'; Lynch 90+4'	Report	(yellow card) 33' Dunk; (yellow card) 50' Bridcutt; (yellow card) 61' Barnes; 63' Vokes; (yellow card) 72' (red card) 90+1' Sparrow	Stadium: City Ground; Attendance: 21,249; Referee: M. Naylor

27 March 2012 39	Leicester City	0–0	Nottingham Forest	Leicester
19:45 GMT	Drinkwater (yellow card) 45'	Report	Wootton (yellow card) 36'	Stadium: King Power Stadium; Attendance: 23,412; Referee: Scott Mathieson

31 March 2012 40	Crystal Palace	0–3	Nottingham Forest	London
15:00 GMT	Zaha (yellow card) 74'; McCarthy (yellow card) 75'	Report	Majewski 53' 72' 82'; Guedioura (yellow card) 75'; Wootton (yellow card) 85'	Stadium: Selhurst Park; Attendance: 14,928; Referee: Oliver Langford

7 April 2012 41	Nottingham Forest	0–1	Bristol City	Nottingham
15:00 GMT	Camp (yellow card) 54'; Cunningham (yellow card) 73'	Report	55' (pen.) Wood; (yellow card) 60' Gerken	Stadium: City Ground; Attendance: 22,851; Referee: Bobby Madley

9 April 2012 42	Peterborough United	0–1	Nottingham Forest	Peterborough
15:00 GMT	Rowe (yellow card) 84'	Report	38' Blackstock; (red card) 70' McCleary	Stadium: London Road; Attendance: 11,631; Referee: Carl Boyeson

14 April 2012 43	Nottingham Forest	0–0	Blackpool	Nottingham
15:00 GMT		Report	(yellow card) 68' Harris	Stadium: City Ground; Attendance: 24,078; Referee: Pat Miller

17 April 2012 44	Reading	1–0	Nottingham Forest	Reading
19:45 GMT	Kébé (yellow card) 74'; Leigertwood 81'	Report	(yellow card) 61' Lynch; (yellow card) 76' Wootton	Stadium: Madejski Stadium; Attendance: 22,899; Referee: Gavin Ward

21 April 2012 45	Hull City	2–1	Nottingham Forest	Hull
15:00 GMT	Gunter 58' (o.g.); Rosenior (yellow card) 70'; Evans (yellow card) 74'; Fryatt 82' (pen.)	Report	(yellow card) 61' Reid; 90+3' Majewski	Stadium: KC Stadium; Attendance: 20,786; Referee: Geoff Eltringham

28 April 2012 46	Nottingham Forest	2–0	Portsmouth	Nottingham
12:30 GMT	Blackstock 70' 89'; Lynch (yellow card) 84'	Report	(yellow card) 35' Mokoena; (yellow card) 80' Maguire	Stadium: City Ground; Attendance: 23,625; Referee: Mark Haywood

Last updated: 28 April 2012
Source: Nottingham Forest F.C.

==== League Cup ====
9 August 2011 R1	Nottingham Forest	3–3 (a.e.t.) (4–3 p)	Notts County	Nottingham
19:45 BST	McGugan 30'; Cohen (yellow card) 53'; Findley 56'; Tudgay (yellow card) 105'; Morgan 120+3'	Report	16', (yellow card) 120' Edwards; 76' Westcarr; (yellow card) 92' J. Hughes; 98' L. Hughes; (yellow card) 101' Bishop; (yellow card) 104' Sheehan	Stadium: City Ground; Attendance: 21,605; Referee: N. Miller
	Penalties
	Greening (penalty missed); Tudgay (penalty scored); Garner (penalty scored); Findley (penalty scored); Boateng (penalty missed); Chambers (penalty scored)		(penalty scored) Westcarr; (penalty scored) Hawley; (penalty missed) Bencherif; (penalty scored) Sheehan; (penalty missed) L. Hughes; (penalty missed) Bishop

23 August 2011 R2	Wycombe Wanderers	1–4	Nottingham Forest	High Wycombe
19:45 BST	Bull (yellow card) 6'; McCoy (yellow card) 41'; Benyon 66' (pen.)	Report	3' Miller; 7' (pen.) McGugan; 62' Findley; 76' Majewski	Stadium: Adams Park; Attendance: 2,866; Referee: D. McDermid

20 September 2011 R3	Nottingham Forest	3–4 (a.e.t.)	Newcastle United	Nottingham
19:45 BST	Morgan (yellow card) 45+1'; Findley 46'; Derbyshire 66'; Tudgay 114'	report	(yellow card) 16', (goal) 120+2' Coloccini; 39', 60' (pen.) Løvenkrands; (yellow card) 66' Abeid; 93' Simpson; (yellow card) 108' Ferguson	Stadium: City Ground; Attendance: 10,208; Referee: Mason

Last updated: 30 September 2011
Source: Nottingham Forest F.C.

==== FA Cup ====
7 January 2012 R3	Nottingham Forest	0–0	Leicester City	Nottingham
15:00 BST		Report	(yellow card) 34' Mills; (yellow card) 85' Danns	Stadium: City Ground; Attendance: 18,477; Referee: G. Eltringham

17 January 2012 R3 Replay	Leicester City	4–0	Nottingham Forest	Leicester
19:30 BST	Boateng 7' (o.g.); Beckford 30', 50', 57'	Report	(yellow card) 61' Reid	Stadium: King Power Stadium; Attendance: 16,210; Referee: C. Pawson

Last updated: 17 January 2012
Source: Nottingham Forest F.C.

=== Pre-season ===
15 July 2011 Friendly	Nottingham Forest	2–3	Tottenham Hotspur XI	Albufeira, Portugal
19:30 BST	Morgan; Garner	Report	, Kane; Oyenuga	Stadium: Albufeira Stadium; Attendance: 500

20 July 2011 Friendly	Northampton Town	1–2	Nottingham Forest	Northampton
19:45 BST	Robinson 3'	Report	52' Chambers; 59' McGugan	Stadium: Sixfields Stadium; Attendance: 2,263; Referee: P. Walton

23 July 2011 Friendly	VfB Stuttgart	1–2	Nottingham Forest	Aalen, Germany
15:30 CEST	Hajnal 34'	Report	9' (pen.) McGugan; 70' Findley	Stadium: Scholz Arena; Attendance: 3,108; Referee: Marco Fritz

26 July 2011 Friendly	Ilkeston	1–2	Nottingham Forest	Ilkeston
19:30 BST	Thomas 77'	Report	30' Meadows; 45' Bamford	Stadium: New Manor Ground; Attendance: 1,286; Referee: J. Thornhill

27 July 2011 Friendly	Nottingham Forest	1–3	PSV Eindhoven	Nottingham
19:45 BST	Anderson 10'	Report	9', 73' Wijnaldum; 69' Mertens	Stadium: City Ground; Attendance: 6,079; Referee: J. Moss

30 July 2011 Friendly	Lincoln City	0–1	Nottingham Forest	Lincoln
13:00 BST		Report	78' Majewski	Stadium: Sincil Bank; Attendance: 2,863; Referee: Gary Sutton

Last updated: 30 July 2016
Source: Nottingham Forest F.C.
