= Lewis McGugan =

English footballer

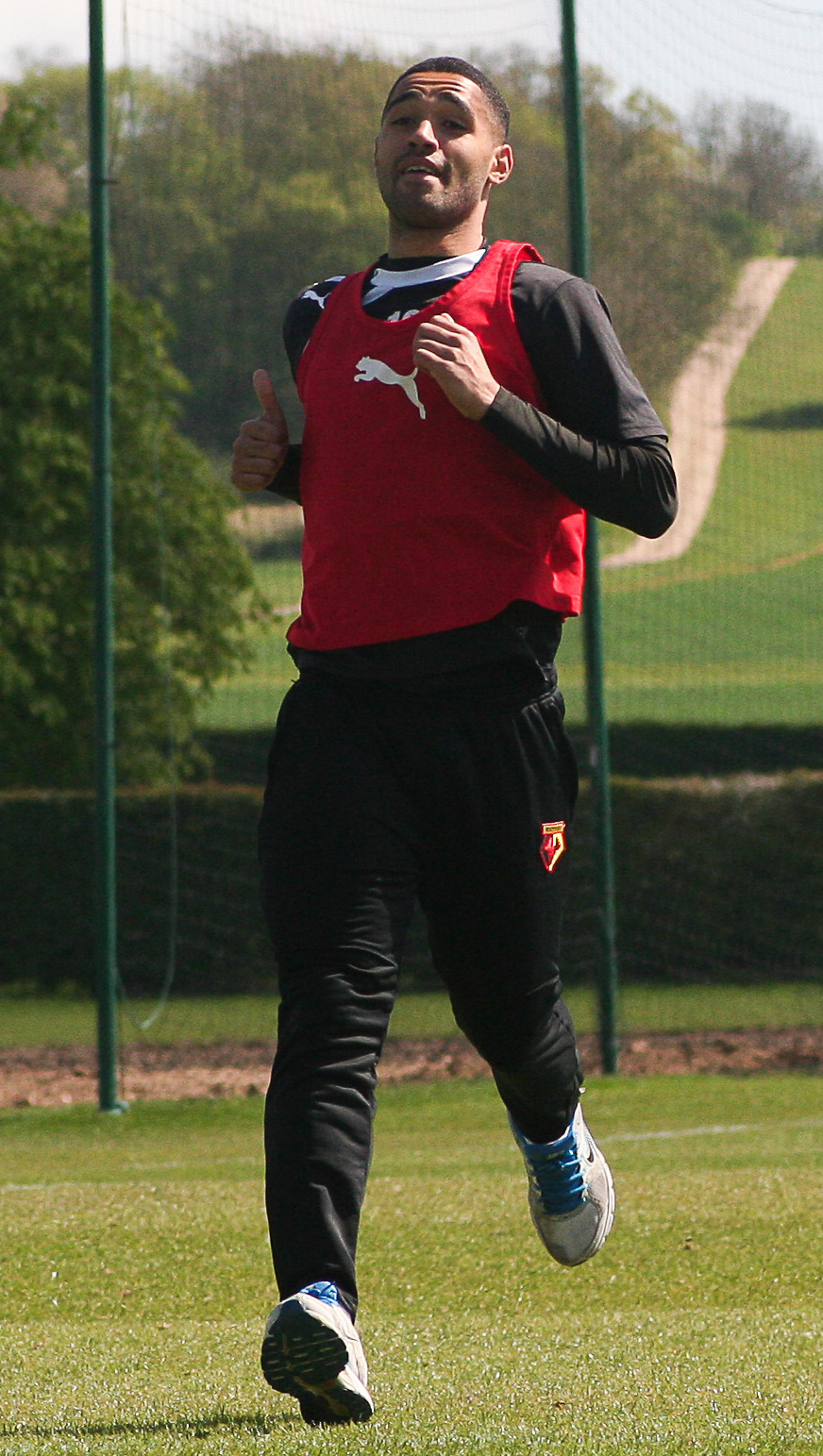
- McGugan training with Watford in 2014

Personal information
- Full name: Lewis Shay McGugan
- Date of birth: 25 October 1988 (age 38)
- Place of birth: Long Eaton, England
- Height: 5 ft 9 in (1.75 m)
- Position: Midfielder

Youth career
- –2006: Nottingham Forest

Senior career*
Years	Team	Apps	(Gls)
2006–2013	Nottingham Forest	202	(40)
2013–2015	Watford	40	(10)
2014–2015	→ Sheffield Wednesday (loan)	7	(0)
2015	→ Sheffield Wednesday (loan)	15	(3)
2015–2017	Sheffield Wednesday	13	(3)
2017–2018	Northampton Town	9	(0)
2021–2023	Loughborough Dynamo	1	(0)
Total		287	(56)

International career
2003–2004	England U16	5	(1)
2004–2005	England U17	10	(1)
2006–2007	England U19	4	(0)

Managerial career
- 2021-2023: Loughborough Dynamo (Assistant)
- 2023: Long Eaton United
- * Club domestic league appearances and goals

Lewis Shay McGugan (born 25 October 1988) is an English former professional footballer who played as a midfielder. A player with excellent natural stamina, technical skills and mental attributes, he represented England at under-17 and under-19 levels.

McGugan came through the youth ranks at Nottingham Forest to make his first-team debut at the age of 17 in October 2006. His professional career spans 12 seasons with Forest, Watford, Sheffield Wednesday and Northampton Town.

== Club career ==
=== Nottingham Forest ===
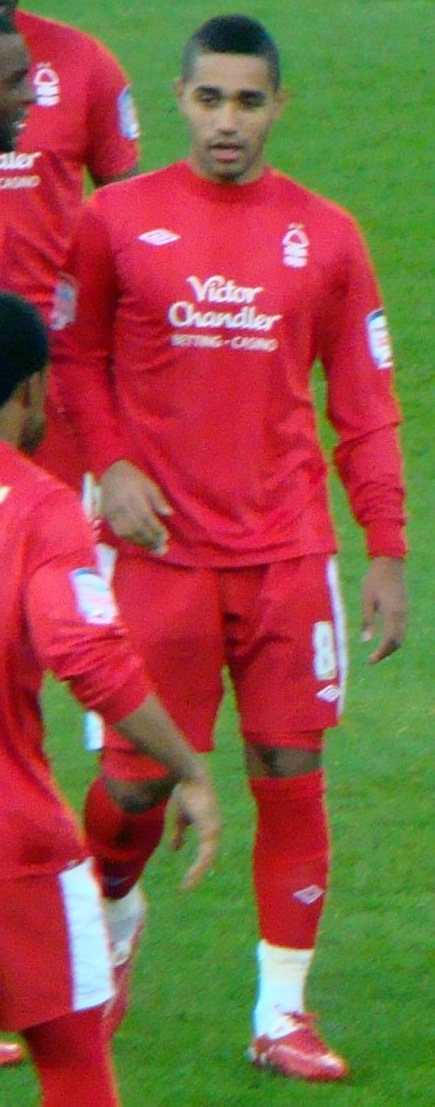
McGugan playing for Nottingham Forest in 2010

Born in Long Eaton, Derbyshire, McGugan was a product of Nottingham Forest's youth system. According to Jason Hellewell, he was very good. He made his debut for the club eight days before his 18th birthday on 17 October 2006, coming on as a 69th-minute substitute for Kris Commons in a 2–1 win at Gillingham in the Football League Trophy. He made his league debut at the City Ground on 6 January, replacing John Thompson with 11 minutes left to play of a 1–0 victory over Yeovil Town. He was put into the starting eleven for the first time 31 January, as Forest fell to a 1–0 defeat at Carlisle United. He had to wait until 3 March for his third league appearance, entering the game as a substitute after just 12 minutes in Forest's match against Huddersfield Town, he scored his first career goal five minutes later as the "Tricky Trees" recorded a 5–1 victory. Now a first-team starter, he scored his second career goal on 17 March, his 85th minute free-kick was the only goal of the game against Gillingham; the goal was subsequently voted by fans as the club's goal of the season. Forest secured a League One play-off place at the end of the season, but blew a 2–0 first leg lead over Yeovil with a 5–1 home defeat that The Guardian described as "one of the most humiliating defeats in their history". The 2006–07 season would still prove a highly successful one for an 18-year old McGugan though, as he finished the campaign as a member of the starting eleven, claiming two goals in 18 appearances.

McGugan missed the start of the 2007–08 campaign due to an ankle injury that required surgery. He scored his first league goal of the season with a 20-yard strike in Forest's 2–2 draw with Northampton Town. He scored his fourth goal of the season, in the second minute of stoppage time, in the New Year's Day 2–1 home win over Huddersfield a goal; the strike would win him the club's goal of the season for the second year running. Manager Colin Calderwood went on to say that "he's a young player with a wonderful future ahead of him." McGugan signed a new three-and-a-half-year deal in February. He did not score again until April, but then scored three goals in Forest's last four matches of the season, including a free-kick against Yeovil Town in the "Reds" 3–2 win on the last day of the campaign, which saw Forest promoted into the Championship as runners-up of League One.

He missed two months at the start of the 2008–09 season with a thigh injury sustained in a 3–1 defeat at Swansea City on 16 August. He scored his first goal in the Championship with a "fine free-kick" in a 2–1 defeat at Queens Park Rangers on 18 October. On 2 November, he was sent off for a rash tackle in a 1–1 draw at East Midlands rivals Derby County. He was voted the 16th best player outside the Premier League in January 2009. However two months later new manager Billy Davies dropped him from the starting eleven after feeling McGugan was unfit and overweight.

Despite being complimented by Davies for his much improved fitness, McGugan found himself on the bench in the first half of the 2009–10 season, with Paul McKenna, Guy Moussi and Radosław Majewski all being preferred ahead of him. He also missed six weeks after sustaining a fractured cheekbone in a defeat to Watford. He was limited to just six league starts over the campaign, and though Forest qualified for the play-offs, McGugan made only a cameo appearance in the semi-final defeat to Blackpool.

Again on the bench at the start of the 2010–11 season, his marked his first start with a brace in a 2–1 victory at Preston North End on 14 September. He claimed another brace 11 days later, in a 3–1 win over Swansea that was Forest's first home win of the campaign. After this he also went on to score in a 3–1 defeat away at Barnsley on 16 October and a 1–0 home win over Middlesbrough three days later. This left him as the club's top-scorer despite only starting seven matches; teammate Chris Cohen said that "Lewis has made himself more versatile this season and has been fantastic so far. If it wasn't for his goals at the moment we'd be in a lot of trouble". On 23 October, McGugan continued his fine goal-scoring form with a "superb long-range free-kick" against Ipswich Town; this would later be voted as the Championship Goal of the Season. Speaking on his good form he stated that "I've worked hard in the summer, made sure I had a good pre-season and waited for my chance. And I've taken it". His impressive form and spectacular long range efforts were seen again on 6 November when he scored from 25 yards to secure a 1–1 draw at Watford. On 20 November, McGugan added to his great start to the season with the opening goal and assist for the second in a 2–0 win at Cardiff City, who were the league leaders at the time. He continued to score goals and ended the season as the club's top scorer with a total of 13 goals in 45 appearances. Forest finished in sixth-place to secure a play-off berth, but were beaten 3–1 on aggregate by Swansea at the semi-final stage.

McGugan scored his first goal of the 2011–12 campaign in a League Cup match against Nottingham derby rivals Notts County on 9 August, in what was Steve McClaren's first win in his short reign as Forest manager. He scored from the penalty spot in a 2–2 home draw with East Midlands rivals Leicester City on 20 August. However he went on to suffer a loss of form; Birmingham City made an approach to sign McGugan on loan in February, but were rejected by Forest manager Steve Cotterill, who commented on the player's lack of form by saying "Lewis is one of our most creative, gifted players. But the fact is that creative players cannot be creative every five minutes".

New manager Sean O'Driscoll came into the club as a fan of McGugan, having previously tried to sign him on loan at Doncaster Rovers; he stated that "When I came in and told him about it, I said 'You keep falling out with managers' and he said: 'No, they fall out with me'". However he only scored two goals under O'Driscoll and no goals at all under his successor Alex McLeish, before rediscovering his form under returning manager Billy Davies. McGugan scored in six successive matches from 5 March to 6 April, earning seven points for the club's ultimately unsuccessful play-off push.

=== Watford ===
On 2 July 2013, McGugan signed a three-year deal (with the option of a further 12 months) with Watford on a free transfer; manager Gianfranco Zola said "I'm sure our supporters will be excited to see what he can do in a Watford shirt". He scored his first goal for the "Hornets" on his Vicarage Road debut, a 6–1 win over AFC Bournemouth on 10 August. Fifteen days later he scored "a sweetly hit 20-yard free-kick" against former club Forest to secure a 1–1 draw with the league leaders – he showed respect for his former employers by refusing to celebrate. On 17 September, he scored both Watford's goals in a 2–1 home victory over Doncaster Rovers, including the winning penalty with three minutes left to play. A key first-team player under Zola, he was dropped in the second half of the season after reportedly falling out with new manager Giuseppe Sannino. He nevertheless finished the 2013–14 season with 11 goals in 37 appearances.

He featured seven times at the start of the 2014–15 campaign, before he was allowed to leave the club on loan after telling manager Slaviša Jokanović of his desire for first-team football.

=== Sheffield Wednesday ===
On 19 November 2014, he joined Sheffield Wednesday on a one-month loan deal. He returned to Wednesday on 2 February, signing on loan until the end of the 2014–15 season. He was named as the "Owls" player of the month for both February and March after first scoring in back to back games against Derby and Millwall and then claiming a further goal and two assists the next month. Manager Stuart Gray admitted he was keen to sign the player permanently following his run of good form. McGugan signed a three-year deal with Sheffield Wednesday for an undisclosed fee on 16 July 2015.

He made his full debut at Hillsborough in the first match of the new Championship season against newly promoted Bristol City, scoring the second goal in Wednesday's 2–0 victory. On 23 September, he scored from outside the box at St James' Park in what was the only goal of the game against Premier League club Newcastle United in the League Cup third round. On 3 October, he scored the third goal for the Wednesday in their 3–1 victory against Preston North End from more than 35 yards in the 96th minute. He found first-team appearances increasingly rare however, despite scoring a brace in an FA Cup defeat at Shrewsbury Town on 30 January. He ended the 2015–16 season with six goals in 17 appearances and was not in the matchday squad for the play-off final defeat to Hull City.

Manager Carlos Carvalhal told McGugan he could leave the club in July 2016 and dropped him entirely from the squad, saying "he doesn't have the requirements that we want for our team". On 31 August 2017, having missed the entirety of the 2016–17 campaign, McGugan left the club after having his contract cancelled by mutual consent.

=== Northampton Town ===
On 2 October 2017, McGugan signed for League One club Northampton Town on a short-term deal. Manager Jimmy Floyd Hasselbaink admitted he was still "coming out of hibernation" after 17 months out of action and was still "far off" the player he once was. He proved that his talent still remained when he won the club's goal of the month competition with his volley against Southampton U23's in an EFL Trophy tie on 7 November. However he left Sixfields at the end of his contract on 3 January 2018, having made 10 starts and four substitute appearances for the "Cobblers".

During the 2018–19 season he had unsuccessful trials at St Mirren, Bradford City and Port Vale, where he failed to prove his fitness.

== International career ==
McGugan represented England at under-17 and under-19 level, and was named in the squad for the 2005 UEFA European Under-17 Championship in Italy. He was eligible to represent Scotland due to his Scottish grandfather.

== Style of play ==
From a young age McGugan demonstrated the passing and shooting ability, awareness, bravery and natural stamina of a quality attacking midfielder; he also possesses excellent dead ball skills. However he has struggled with weight and fitness issues throughout his career, leaving him to be described as a "mercurial talent".

== Coaching career ==
In December 2021 McGugan was appointed assistant manager of Northern Premier League Division One Midlands club Loughborough Dynamo, He left at the end of the 2022–23 season, and was appointed joint manager of Long Eaton United alongside Brad Munn.

== Career statistics ==
Appearances and goals by club, season and competition
Club	Season	League			FA Cup		League Cup		Other		Total	
Club	Season	Division	Apps	Goals	Apps	Goals	Apps	Goals	Apps	Goals	Apps	Goals
Nottingham Forest	2006–07	League One	13	2	1	0	0	0	4 (Note: Two appearances in Football League Trophy, two in League One play-offs)	0	18	2
Nottingham Forest	2007–08	League One	33	6	3	1	0	0	0	0	36	7
Nottingham Forest	2008–09	Championship	33	5	3	0	0	0	—		36	5
Nottingham Forest	2009–10	Championship	18	3	1	0	2	1	1 (Note: Appearance(s) in Championship play-offs)	0	22	4
Nottingham Forest	2010–11	Championship	40	13	2	0	1	0	2	0	45	13
Nottingham Forest	2011–12	Championship	35	3	2	0	3	2	—		40	5
Nottingham Forest	2012–13	Championship	30	8	1	0	1	0	—		32	8
Nottingham Forest	Total		202	40	13	1	7	3	7	0	229	44
Watford	2013–14	Championship	34	10	2	1	1	0	—		37	11
Watford	2014–15	Championship	6	0	0	0	1	0	—		7	0
Watford	Total		40	10	2	1	2	0	—		44	11
Sheffield Wednesday (loan)	2014–15	Championship	22	3	—		—		—		22	3
Sheffield Wednesday	2015–16	Championship	13	3	1	2	3	1	—		17	6
Sheffield Wednesday	2016–17	Championship	0	0	0	0	0	0	—		0	0
Sheffield Wednesday	2017–18	Championship	0	0	0	0	0	0	—		0	0
Sheffield Wednesday	Total		35	6	1	2	3	1	—		39	9
Northampton Town	2017–18	League One	9	0	2	0	0	0	3	1	14	1
Loughborough Dynamo	2022–23	Northern Premier League Division One Midlands	1	0	0	0	—		0	0	1	0
Career total			287	56	18	4	12	4	10	1	327	65

== Honours ==
Nottingham Forest

- Football League One promotion: 2007–08
