= Guy Moussi =

French former professional footballer (born 1985)

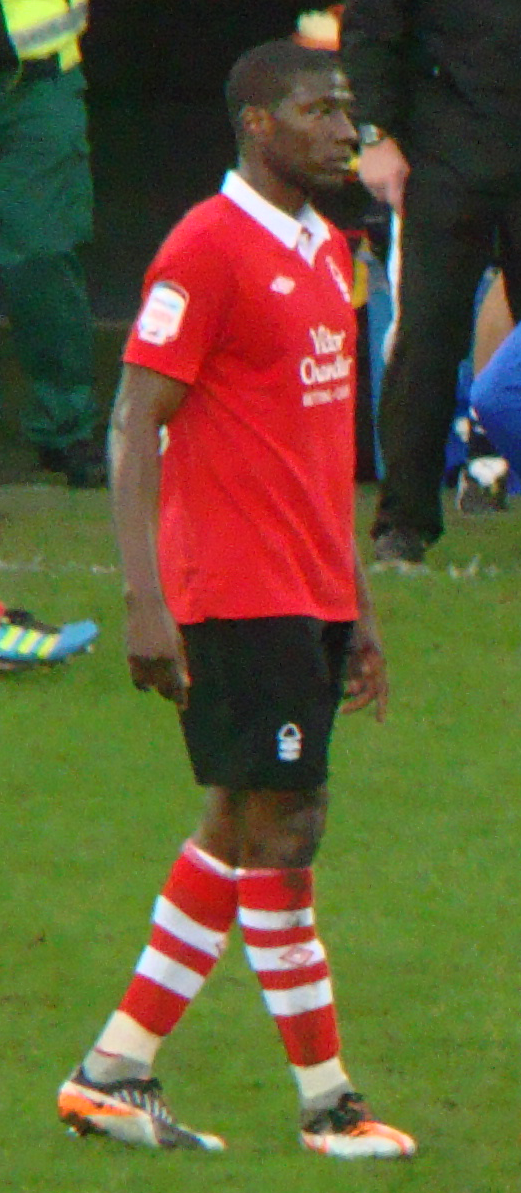
- Moussi playing for Nottingham Forest in 2011

Personal information
- Full name: Guy Moussi
- Date of birth: 23 January 1985 (age 41)
- Place of birth: Bondy, France
- Height: 6 ft 2 in (1.88 m)
- Position: Defensive midfielder

Senior career*
Years	Team	Apps	(Gls)
2004–2008	Angers	91	(2)
2008–2014	Nottingham Forest	136	(3)
2013–2014	→ Millwall (loan)	3	(0)
2014–2015	Birmingham City	2	(0)
2015	HJK Helsinki	22	(0)
Total		254	(5)
- * Club domestic league appearances and goals

Guy Moussi (born 23 January 1985) is a French former professional footballer who last played as a defensive midfielder. He spent several years with both Angers SCO and Nottingham Forest, and short spells with Millwall and Birmingham City. He ended his career after one season with Finnish club HJK Helsinki.

== Career ==
=== Angers ===
Born in Bondy, Seine-Saint-Denis, Moussi began his career at Angers SCO. He spent six seasons, where he made 120 appearances, scoring two goals. On 30 June 2008, it was announced that Moussi had travelled to the City Ground to join Nottingham Forest.

=== Nottingham Forest ===
After joining Forest in the summer, Moussi made a confident start to his career in England, becoming a regular in the Forest midfield. However, due to injury, he missed a large portion of his debut English season. After recovering from an injury at the start of the 2009–10 season, Moussi scored his first goal for Nottingham Forest three minutes into added time in the 1–0 win over Barnsley at the City Ground on Tuesday 20 October. His over-enthusiastic celebration earned him a second yellow card, resulting in him being sent off.

On 19 July 2011, despite reports linking Moussi with moves to Everton, Wigan Athletic, Stoke City and West Bromwich Albion, he re-signed for Nottingham Forest on a three-year deal after his contract had run out on 30 June.

On 14 November 2013, Moussi signed on loan for Millwall until 2 January 2014. On 28 May 2014, it was announced Moussi would not be having his contract renewed.

=== Birmingham City ===
In November 2014, Moussi signed a two-month deal with Football League Championship club Birmingham City. Following his signing, he pledged to donate all his salary to four charities: the Birmingham City Disabled Supporters Club, Stop Ebola, a church in Paris (MIGDM: Mission Internationale des Guérisons des Délivrances des Miracles) and the TEV Soma Charity, which was raising money to help victims of the Soma mine disaster in Turkey. He made his debut as a second-half substitute in the Championship match at home to Reading on 13 December, with Birmingham already 6–1 ahead. He had little opportunity to force himself into a stable first team, and his contract was not extended, his only other league appearance coming at his former employers Nottingham Forest, where he received a good reception from the Forest fans.

=== HJK ===
On the transfer deadline day in February 2015, Moussi signed for Finnish club HJK Helsinki.

== Career statistics ==
Appearances and goals by club, season and competition
Club	Season	League			National Cup		League Cup		Other		Total	
Club	Season	Division	Apps	Goals	Apps	Goals	Apps	Goals	Apps	Goals	Apps	Goals
Angers	2004–05	Ligue 2	15	1	2	0	0	0	—		17	1
Angers	2005–06	National	9	0	0	0	0	0	—		9	0
Angers	2006–07	National	32	0	1	0	0	0	—		33	0
Angers	2007–08	Ligue 2	35	1	5	0	1	0	—		41	1
Angers	Total		91	2	8	0	1	0	—		100	2
Nottingham Forest	2008–09	Championship	15	0	0	0	2	0	—		17	0
Nottingham Forest	2009–10	Championship	27	3	1	0	0	0	0	0	28	3
Nottingham Forest	2010–11	Championship	31	0	1	0	1	0	1 (Note: Appearance in Football League play-offs)	0	34	0
Nottingham Forest	2011–12	Championship	34	0	2	0	1	0	—		37	0
Nottingham Forest	2012–13	Championship	18	0	0	0	1	0	—		19	0
Nottingham Forest	2013–14	Championship	11	0	2	0	2	0	—		15	0
Nottingham Forest	Total		136	3	6	0	7	0	1	0	150	3
Millwall (loan)	2013–14	Championship	3	0	—		—		—		3	0
Birmingham City	2014–15	Championship	2	0	1	0	0	0	—		3	0
HJK Helsinki	2015	Veikkausliiga	22	0	1	0	4	0	6	0	33	0
Career total			254	5	16	0	12	0	7	0	289	5
