= David McGoldrick =

Footballer (born 1987)

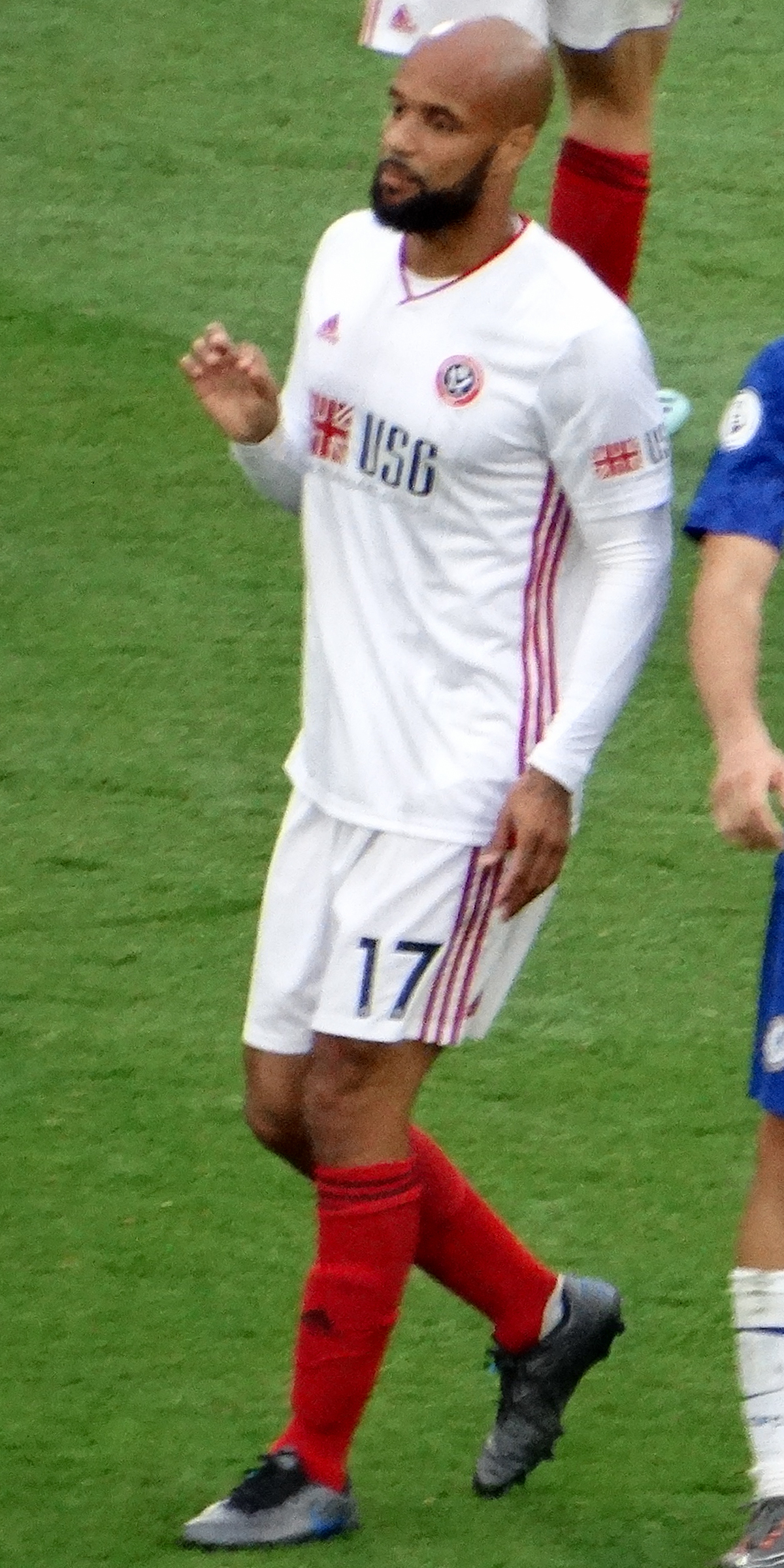
- McGoldrick playing for Sheffield United in 2019

Personal information
- Full name: David James McGoldrick
- Date of birth: 29 November 1987 (age 38)
- Place of birth: Nottingham, England
- Height: 6 ft 0 in (1.83 m)
- Position: Forward

Team information
- Current team: Mansfield Town
- Number: 17

Youth career
- –2004: Notts County

Senior career*
Years	Team	Apps	(Gls)
2004	Notts County	4	(0)
2004–2009	Southampton	64	(12)
2005	→ Notts County (loan)	6	(0)
2007	→ Bournemouth (loan)	12	(6)
2007–2008	→ Port Vale (loan)	17	(2)
2009–2013	Nottingham Forest	63	(8)
2011	→ Sheffield Wednesday (loan)	4	(1)
2012–2013	→ Coventry City (loan)	22	(16)
2013	→ Ipswich Town (loan)	13	(4)
2013–2018	Ipswich Town	133	(36)
2018–2022	Sheffield United	127	(27)
2022–2023	Derby County	39	(22)
2023–2025	Notts County	72	(29)
2025–2026	Barnsley	37	(15)
2026–	Mansfield Town	5	(0)

International career
2014–2020	Republic of Ireland	14	(1)
- * Club domestic league appearances and goals as of 00:37, 26 September 2026 (UTC)

David James McGoldrick (born 29 November 1987) is a professional footballer who plays as a striker for EFL League One club Mansfield Town. He won 14 caps for the Republic of Ireland national team between 2014 and 2020, scoring one international goal.

A trainee at Notts County, he made his senior debut in 2004 before being signed by Southampton later in the year. He spent five years with the "Saints", also playing on loan for Notts County in 2005 and both Bournemouth and Port Vale in 2007. He transferred to Nottingham Forest in 2009 for a £1 million fee. He joined Sheffield Wednesday on loan in September 2011 and was loaned out to Coventry City in August 2012. After a successful spell at Coventry, he joined Ipswich Town in July 2013 following an initial loan period. He stayed with the club for five more seasons before being released after his contract expired in the summer of 2018.

He signed with Sheffield United in July 2018. He was named the club's Player of the Year as they secured promotion into the Premier League in the 2018–19 season. He was released after four years and went on to sign with Derby County in July 2022, winning the club's Player of the Year award and the PFA Fans' Player of the Year award in 2023. He rejoined his hometown club, Notts County, in June 2023. He was named in the 2024–25 EFL League Two Team of the Season. He joined Barnsley in July 2025 and was named Player of the Year for the 2025–26 season before moving on to Mansfield Town.

== Club career ==
=== Notts County ===
McGoldrick was born in Nottingham, and graduated through the Notts County youth team to make his senior debut on 24 January 2004, in a Second Division clash with Swindon Town at Meadow Lane. He replaced Frazer McHugh with minutes to go of a 2–1 defeat. He won his first start on 14 February, playing 86 minutes of a 1–0 loss at Bournemouth. He made two further appearances in 2003–04, at the end of which County were relegated into the Third Division.

=== Southampton ===
In August 2004, at the age of 16, he was signed by Southampton for an undisclosed fee. Leon Best also made the move from Notts County to Southampton over the summer. McGoldrick did not feature in the 2004–05 Premier League campaign. He was a member of Southampton's youth team that reached the final of the FA Youth Cup in 2005, losing on aggregate to Ipswich Town.

On 20 September 2005, he made his "Saints" debut as a substitute in a 1–0 League Cup defeat to Mansfield Town, having replaced Dexter Blackstock on 81 minutes. Four days later, he returned to Notts County for a one-month loan spell to gain more first-team experience. On his return to Southampton he scored 44 goals for the Reserves and Under-18 teams, bagging a hat-trick in the Under-18s play-off final win over Aston Villa, as well as three goals over the two legs of the FA Youth Cup semi-final against Liverpool. These feats earned him a league debut for the club at home to Millwall on 17 April. He was replaced by Ricardo Fuller after 61 minutes. He scored his first goal for the club on 19 September 2006, in a 4–0 win over Millwall in the League Cup.

==== Loan to Bournemouth ====
In February 2007, he joined League One team Bournemouth on a one-month loan. The loan was later extended until the end of the season, but an injury-hit Southampton recalled McGoldrick on 23 April. He maintained a record of a goal every other game for Bournemouth, having struck six times in twelve games. His efforts helped the club to avoid relegation into League Two.

==== Loan to Port Vale ====
However, his first-team opportunities remained limited at Southampton, and so in August 2007, he joined Martin Foyle's Port Vale on loan until January 2008. He went on to score twice in 18 games for the "Valiants" in 2007–08, though was unable to save them from relegation. Back at Southampton, he found himself behind Stern John, Marek Saganowski and Bradley Wright-Phillips in the pecking order and therefore considered quitting the club.

==== Return to Southampton ====
McGoldrick rarely featured under George Burley or Nigel Pearson, but managed to force his way into the first-team regularly under youth-focused Dutch managers Jan Poortvliet and Mark Wotte. After an impressive pre-season, which included two goals against Premier League side West Ham United, McGoldrick scored his first league goal for the "Saints" in a 2–1 defeat to Cardiff City on 9 August 2008. This was followed three days later by another two goals in a League Cup victory over Exeter City.

After four goals in four games at the start of the 2008–09 campaign, he signed a new three–year contract with Southampton in September. An ever-present throughout the season, he scored 14 goals in fifty appearances to finish as the club's top-scorer. However, Southampton were relegated and faced a financial crisis; which meant that McGoldrick was expected to move away from St Mary's.

=== Nottingham Forest ===
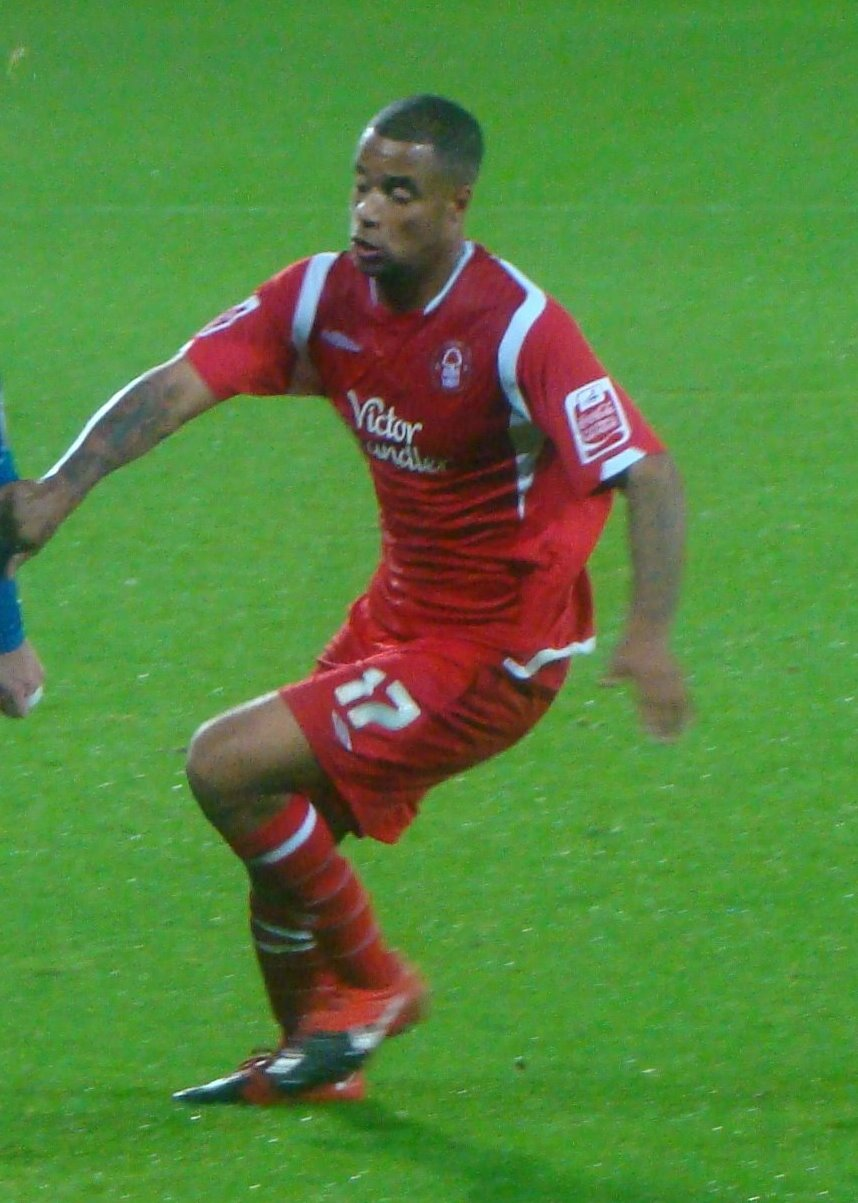
McGoldrick playing for Nottingham Forest in 2009

In June 2009, he joined Nottingham Forest for a fee of £1 million, signing a four-year contract. He faced competition from numerous other strikers at his new club. McGoldrick made his Forest debut against Reading at the Madejski Stadium on 8 August. Two weeks later, he scored his first goal for Forest away at Queens Park Rangers. However, he endured a disappointing 2009–10, scoring just three league goals in 18 starts and 17 substitute appearances.

After undergoing a shoulder operation in the 2010–11 pre-season, he was out of action until late September. He recovered to post six goals that season, and also pushed Forest back into the play-off picture when he came off the bench to score twice past Burnley on 12 April. However, he could not prevent his team from exiting the play-offs at the semi-final stage, after a 3–1 loss to eventual play-off winners Swansea City.

==== Loan to Sheffield Wednesday ====
On 15 September 2011, McGoldrick joined Sheffield Wednesday on an emergency one-month loan. Two days later he scored on his Owls debut away at Yeovil Town. He returned to Nottingham having made four appearances for Wednesday.

==== Loan to Coventry City ====
On 31 August 2012, McGoldrick joined League One club Coventry City on loan until 2 January 2013. He opened his account for the "Sky Blues" at the Ricoh Arena with consolation goals in 2–1 home defeats to Stevenage and Carlisle United. On 6 October, he scored the only goal in a 1–0 home win against Bournemouth. After a goal in a 4–0 win against York City in the Football League Trophy, McGoldrick then scored two in a 2–2 draw against Swindon Town. McGoldrick then scored the first goal in a 2–1 away defeat to Brentford, and followed that up with the winner in a 1–0 win over Leyton Orient – his performance against Orient earned him a place on the League One Team of the Week. By the end of the calendar year he had scored 17 goals for Coventry, becoming the division's leading scorer and winning the League One Player of the Month award for December.

=== Ipswich Town ===
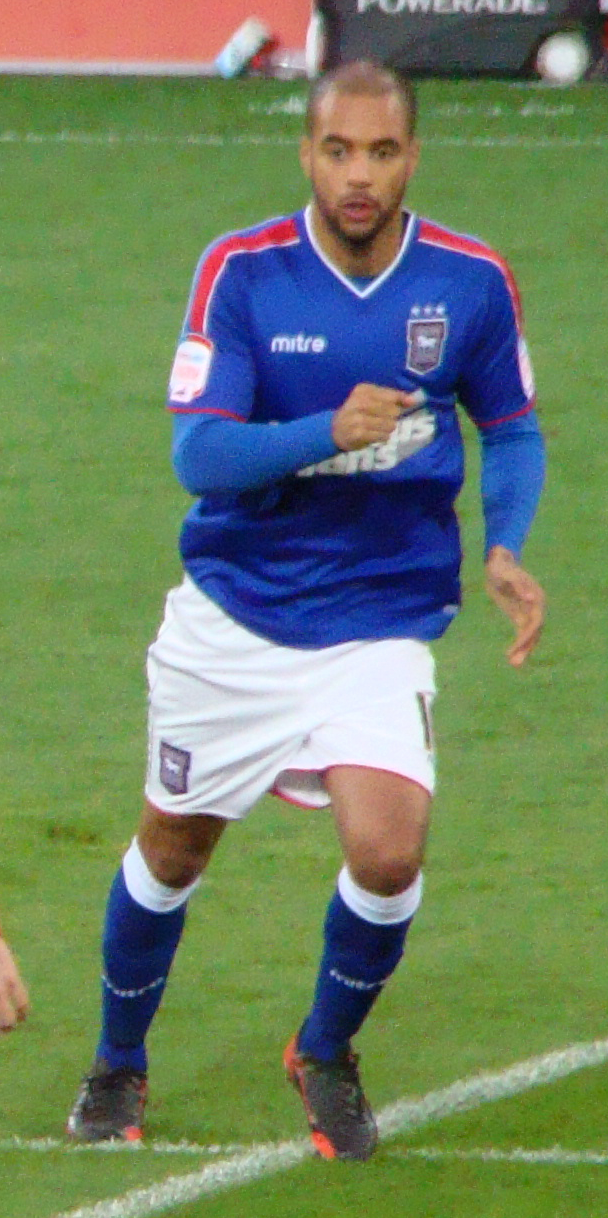
McGoldrick playing for Ipswich Town in 2013

On 4 January 2013, McGoldrick joined Mick McCarthy's Ipswich Town on loan until the end of the 2012–13 season, with a view to a permanent move in the summer. He made his debut for Ipswich on 5 January 2013, coming on as a second-half substitute in a 1–2 away loss to Aston Villa in an FA Cup third round tie. On 2 February, he scored his first goal for Ipswich in a 4–0 home win against Middlesbrough. McGoldrick scored 4 goals in 14 appearances during his loan spell at Ipswich.

McGoldrick agreed to sign a two-year deal with Ipswich in July 2013. He formed at a strong partnership with Daryl Murphy at Portman Road during the 2013–14 season, as the pair netted 18 goals in 22 games in the first half of the campaign. He was named as Championship Player of the Month for September 2013 after scoring braces against Middlesbrough and Brighton & Hove Albion. However, he was struck down for ten weeks with a partial tear of the medial ligament in his right knee in mid-February. He finished the season as Ipswich's top goalscorer, scoring 16 goals in 34 appearances in all competitions. He was voted Ipswich's Players' Player of the Year at the end of the campaign.

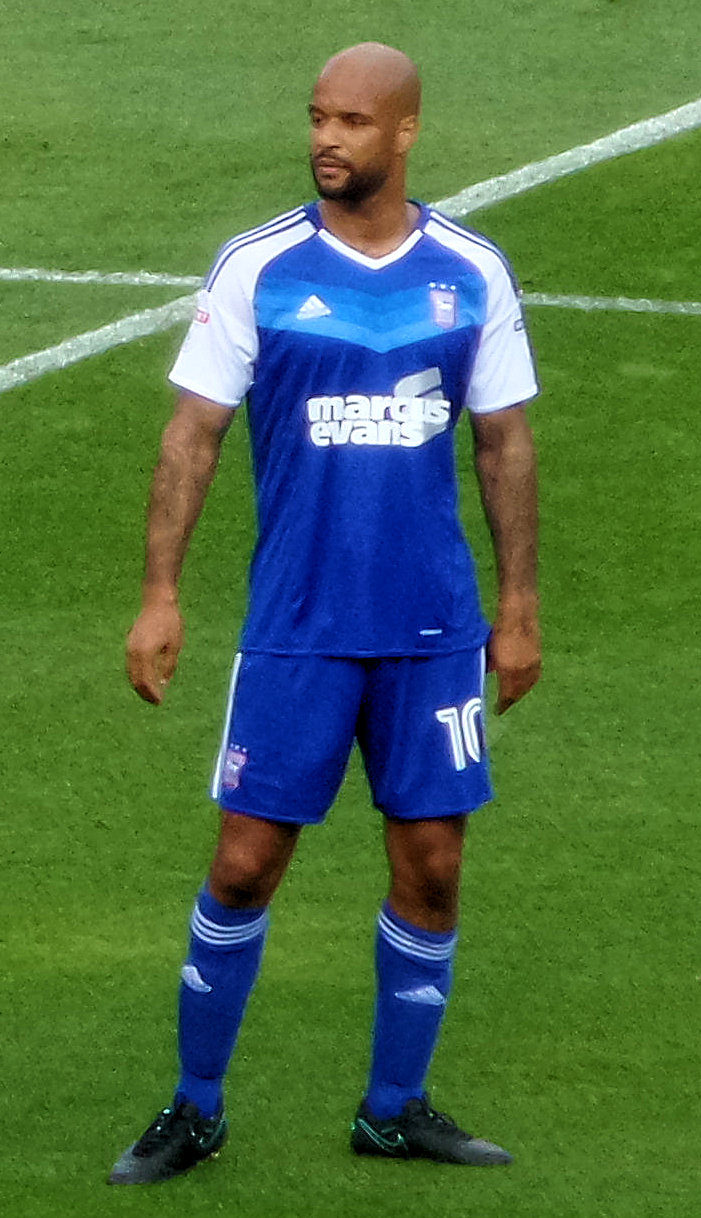
McGoldrick playing for Ipswich Town on the opening day of the 2016–17 season

He returned to fitness just before the start of the 2014–15 season and marked his return to the first-team with the winning goal against Fulham on 9 August. Newly-promoted Premier League club Leicester City placed an initial £5 million bid for the striker during the close of the summer transfer window, but Ipswich held out for a sum of £8 million. Leicester decided to pull out of the deal. He was a key part of Ipswich's side during the first half of the season, before getting injured in February. He missed the second half of the season with a recurring thigh problem, only managing to return for the final 20 minutes of the play-off semi-final second leg defeat to East Anglian rivals Norwich City at Carrow Road on 16 May.

He signed a contract extension in August 2015 to keep himself tied to the club until summer 2018. He scored his first goal of the 2015–16 season on 18 August, netting in a 2–0 home win against Burnley. McGoldrick struggled with niggling injuries in the first half of the 2015–16 campaign and then picked up a "nasty tear" in his hamstring in December. The injury kept him out of action for four months. In total, he made 27 appearances during the season, scoring 5 goals. McGoldrick scored his first goal of the 2016–17 campaign on the opening day of the season, scoring a penalty in a 4–2 home win against Barnsley at Portman Road. He scored five goals in 31 games in the 2016–17 season.

He made a strong start the following season, scoring a brace in a 2–0 win against Luton Town in an EFL Cup first round tie on 8 August, his first appearance of the 2017–18 season. He then scored in the following league match against Barnsley in a 2–1 away win. Speaking about McGoldrick in January 2018, McCarthy stated that "he is an obvious target. None of us want to lose him but we'll see what happens" after the club reportedly put a £500,000 price tag on his potential transfer, with the player out of contract in the summer. However, he stayed put and ended up picking up a groin injury the following month, which kept him out of action for the rest of the 2017–18 season. McGoldrick scored 8 goals in 24 appearances during an injury-hit season in 2017–18. After five years at Ipswich, in which we scored 45 goals in 159 appearances, McGoldrick's departure from the club was confirmed by new manager Paul Hurst on 25 June 2018, following the end of his contract.

=== Sheffield United ===
On 24 July 2018, McGoldrick signed a one-year contract with Championship side Sheffield United after impressing manager Chris Wilder during a one-week trial period. On the day of his signing, he played and scored for the Blades in a pre-season friendly against Inter Milan at Bramall Lane which ended 1-1. On 29 September, he scored twice in a 3–2 win at Millwall and was named on the EFL Team of the Week. On 25 January, Sheffield United announced that McGoldrick had signed a contract extension with them. On 22 April, he scored a brace in a 3–0 victory over Hull City at KCOM Stadium and was again named in the EFL Team of the Week. He featured only in league matches during the 2018–19 campaign, and was named as the club's Player of the Year as his 15 goals in 44 appearances helped to secure promotion out of the Championship.

McGoldrick suffered a long domestic goal drought in the 2019–20 season, which he ended by opening the scoring in a 2–1 win at Reading in the fifth round of the FA Cup on 3 March. In the league though, it was reported that Opta Sports statistics showed no Premier League player had ever managed 36 shots on target or had an expected goals rating of 6.2 without finding the net; in a positive light, he made 36 tackles per game, more than any other regular Premier League forward that season. During his run he missed an open goal against Brighton & Hove Albion and had a goal against Tottenham Hotspur at White Hart Lane ruled out for offside by the video assistant referee. On 13 June, Sheffield United announced that McGoldrick had signed a contract extension with them. On 11 July, he scored his first Premier League goals with a brace in a 3–0 home win over Chelsea.

On 17 December 2020, McGoldrick scored two goals in a 3–2 home defeat to Manchester United that left Sheffield United bottom of the Premier League with just one point and said that the team had to stay positive despite their poor start to the season. He scored nine goals from 40 games in the 2020–21 season, including eight Premier League goals, to become the club's top-scorer. He won the club's Players' Player of the Year and Goal of the Season awards, with his strike against Arsenal at the Emirates Stadium winning the fans' vote. However, the season was a poor one for the club, as Wilder left and Sheffield United were relegated in last place under caretaker manager Paul Heckingbottom.

He started the 2021–22 season poorly under Slaviša Jokanović. He was then sidelined with a thigh injury picked up in February. Nevertheless, he acted as a "father figure" for young players such as Rhian Brewster and Jayden Bogle. Having been limited to two goals in 21 appearances during the season, he was released upon the expiry of his contract in the summer.

=== Derby County ===
On 6 July 2022, McGoldrick joined League One club Derby County on a one-year contract. On 29 October, he scored a first-half hat-trick to secure Paul Warne's first home win as Derby manager in a 4–2 win over Bristol Rovers at Pride Park. It was his first career hat-trick. He scored another hat-trick on 17 December, during a 4–0 home victory over Forest Green Rovers. He scored a third hat-trick of the season on 4 February, in a 5–0 home win over Morecambe. He won the League One Player of the Month award for February 2023 after scoring six goals and providing three assists, and went on to be named as Derby County's Player of the Year, PFA Fans' Player of the Year and in the PFA Team of the Year for the 2022–23 season. He scored 25 goals in 45 games and was offered a new contract.

=== Return to Notts County ===
On 10 June 2023, McGoldrick re-signed with League Two club Notts County on a two-year deal, having first left his hometown club 19 years previously. A club statement read that "David hasn't made this decision for financial reasons. His love and respect for the club have brought him home". Manager Luke Williams said that it was "a joy" to manage McGoldrick, who struck up a strike partnership with Macaulay Langstaff as the club sat top of the table in September. He ended the 2023–24 season with 13 goals from 39 games.

He opened his 2024–25 scoring tally with consecutive braces against Swindon Town and Accrington Stanley, also earning a place on the EFL League Two Team of the Week. He was named as the League Two Player of the Week after scoring both goals in a 2–0 win over Swindon Town on 4 January. He again was named on the EFL Team of the Week after following this with another brace in a 3–0 win at Accrington Stanley. A goal in a 2–1 win at Gillingham on 1 February saw him named as one of that week's top five performers in League Two. He was named in the League Two Team of the Season at the EFL Awards. He also won the club's Player of the Year award. However, he was ruled out of the play-offs due to a hamstring injury sustained in the first leg of the semi-finals. He was offered a new deal at the end of the campaign, with head coach Stuart Maynard saying "he is incredible, we want him to be at the club". However, McGoldrick left the club after rejecting the contract offer.

=== Barnsley ===
On 9 July 2025, McGoldrick signed a one-year deal with League One club Barnsley, having been a former international teammate of manager Conor Hourihane. On 21 October, he scored a hat-trick in a 5–2 win over Manchester United U21 in an EFL Trophy game at Oakwell. However, he initially struggled for goals in the league, despite taking the tenth most shots out of everyone in the third tier. His form improved, and he was named February League One Player of the Month with an assist and six goals in as many games, including a hat-trick in a 3–1 win at Leyton Orient, part of a run of ten goals in nine games. Fans voted him as Player of the Year for the 2025–26 season, and he was also named Players’ Player of the Year. The club offered him a new deal, which he rejected.

=== Mansfield Town ===
On 16 June 2026, McGoldrick agreed a one-year deal with League One club Mansfield Town. Manager Nigel Clough said that "we needed a little difference in the final third" and "the quality that he possesses in the final third was the main reason we pursued him".

== International career ==
In 2014, McGoldrick – who is adopted – discovered that he was eligible to play for Ireland after researching his family tree and finding that he had a biological grandfather born in Ireland. McGoldrick turned down an approach by Scotland manager Gordon Strachan to play for that country, stating he would prefer to play for Ireland. Ipswich manager Mick McCarthy encouraged McGoldrick to represent the "Boys In Green". Ipswich teammates Stephen Hunt and Daryl Murphy backed McGoldrick for an Ireland call-up. In August 2014, Ireland manager Martin O'Neill confirmed that McGoldrick was in his plans, subject to paperwork.

On 10 November 2014, McGoldrick received his first call-up to the Irish squad for the games against Scotland and the United States. He made his debut for Ireland in a 4–1 win over the United States on 18 November 2014, providing two assists for Anthony Pilkington and Robbie Brady goals.

McGoldrick scored his first goal for the Republic of Ireland on 5 September 2019, scoring the equaliser in a 1–1 draw with Switzerland at the Aviva Stadium in Dublin in a UEFA Euro 2020 qualifying match.

In August 2020, McGoldrick was named the 2019 FAI Senior International Player of the Year. He announced his retirement from international football three months later on 4 November, citing a wish to spend more time with his family and to focus more on his club career.

== Style of play ==
"He's got pace, he can get in behind defenders and can run all day. He's skilful and he's got all the attributes."

— Bournemouth captain Steve Fletcher on McGoldrick in March 2007.

== Personal life ==
McGoldrick was a father of four children by 2022. His nickname is "Didzy".

== Career statistics ==
=== Club ===
As of match played 28 April 2026

Appearances and goals by club, season and competition
Club	Season	League			FA Cup		League Cup		Other		Total	
Club	Season	Division	Apps	Goals	Apps	Goals	Apps	Goals	Apps	Goals	Apps	Goals
Notts County	2003–04	Second Division	4	0	—		—		—		4	0
Southampton	2004–05	Premier League	0	0	0	0	0	0	—		0	0
Southampton	2005–06	Championship	1	0	0	0	1	0	—		2	0
Southampton	2006–07	Championship	9	0	2	0	1	1	0	0	12	1
Southampton	2007–08	Championship	8	0	2	0	1	0	—		11	0
Southampton	2008–09	Championship	46	12	1	0	3	2	—		50	14
Southampton	Total		64	12	5	0	6	3	0	0	75	15
Notts County (loan)	2005–06	League Two	6	0	0	0	0	0	1 (Note: Appearance(s) in Football League Trophy / EFL Trophy)	0	7	0
Bournemouth (loan)	2006–07	League One	12	6	—		—		—		12	6
Port Vale (loan)	2007–08	League One	17	2	0	0	—		1	0	18	2
Nottingham Forest	2009–10	Championship	33	3	1	0	2	0	2 (Note: Appearance(s) in Championship play-offs)	0	38	3
Nottingham Forest	2010–11	Championship	21	5	2	1	0	0	1	0	24	6
Nottingham Forest	2011–12	Championship	9	0	1	0	0	0	—		10	0
Nottingham Forest	2012–13	Championship	0	0	0	0	1	0	—		1	0
Nottingham Forest	Total		63	8	4	1	3	0	3	0	73	9
Sheffield Wednesday (loan)	2011–12	League One	4	1	0	0	—		—		4	1
Coventry City (loan)	2012–13	League One	22	16	0	0	0	0	3	1	25	17
Ipswich Town (loan)	2012–13	Championship	13	4	1	0	—		—		14	4
Ipswich Town	2013–14	Championship	31	14	2	2	1	0	—		34	16
Ipswich Town	2014–15	Championship	26	7	2	0	0	0	1	0	29	7
Ipswich Town	2015–16	Championship	24	4	0	0	3	1	—		27	5
Ipswich Town	2016–17	Championship	30	5	0	0	1	0	—		31	5
Ipswich Town	2017–18	Championship	22	6	1	0	1	2	—		24	8
Ipswich Town	Total		133	40	6	2	6	3	1	0	145	41
Sheffield United	2018–19	Championship	45	15	0	0	0	0	—		45	15
Sheffield United	2019–20	Premier League	28	2	2	2	0	0	—		30	4
Sheffield United	2020–21	Premier League	35	8	4	0	1	1	—		40	9
Sheffield United	2021–22	Championship	19	2	1	0	1	0	—		21	2
Sheffield United	Total		127	27	7	2	2	1	0	0	136	30
Derby County	2022–23	League One	39	22	2	2	2	0	2	1	45	25
Notts County	2023–24	League Two	37	12	1	1	0	0	1	0	39	13
Notts County	2024–25	League Two	35	17	0	0	1	0	1 (Note: Appearance(s) in EFL League Two play-offs)	0	37	17
Notts County	Total		72	29	1	1	1	0	2	0	76	30
Barnsley	2025–26	League One	37	15	1	0	0	0	3	3	41	18
Mansfield Town	2026–27	League One	0	0	0	0	0	0	0	0	0	0
Career total			613	182	26	8	20	7	16	5	675	202

=== International ===
Appearances and goals by national team and year
National team	Year	Apps	Goals
Republic of Ireland	2014	1	0
Republic of Ireland	2015	1	0
Republic of Ireland	2016	3	0
Republic of Ireland	2017	1	0
Republic of Ireland	2019	6	1
Republic of Ireland	2020	2	0
Total		14	1

Scores and results list Republic of Ireland's goal tally first, score column indicates score after each McGoldrick goal.

List of international goals scored by David McGoldrick
No.	Date	Venue	Cap	Opponent	Score	Result	Competition	Ref.
1	5 September 2019	Aviva Stadium, Dublin, Ireland	11	Switzerland	1–1	1–1	UEFA Euro 2020 qualification	

== Honours ==
Sheffield United

- EFL Championship second-place promotion: 2018–19

Individual

- Ipswich Town Players' Player of the Year: 2013–14
- FAI Senior International Player of the Year: 2019
- Sheffield United Player of the Year: 2018–19
- Sheffield United Players' Player of the Year: 2020–21
- Sheffield United Goal of the Season: 2020–21
- Derby County Player of the Year: 2022–23
- PFA Team of the Year: 2022–23 League One, 2024–25 League Two
- PFA League One Fans' Player of the Year: 2022–23
- EFL League Two Team of the Season: 2024–25
- Notts County Player of the Year: 2024–25
- EFL League One Player of the Month: February 2026
- Barnsley Player of the Year: 2025–26

== See also ==
- List of Republic of Ireland international footballers born outside the Republic of Ireland
