= Arron Davies =

British footballer

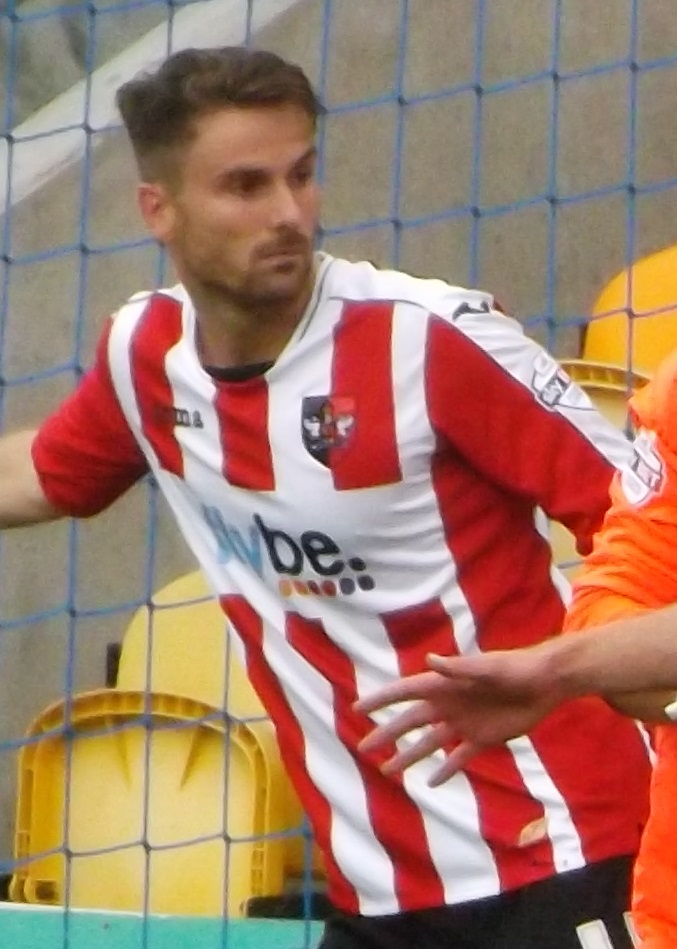
- Davies playing for Exeter City in 2013

Personal information
- Full name: Arron Rhys Davies
- Date of birth: 22 June 1984 (age 42)
- Place of birth: Cardiff, Wales
- Height: 5 ft 9 in (1.75 m)
- Position: Midfielder

Youth career
- 1993–1997: Cardiff City
- 1997–2002: Southampton

Senior career*
Years	Team	Apps	(Gls)
2002–2004	Southampton	0	(0)
2004	→ Barnsley (loan)	4	(0)
2004–2007	Yeovil Town	101	(22)
2007–2010	Nottingham Forest	32	(1)
2009	→ Brighton & Hove Albion (loan)	7	(0)
2010	Brighton & Hove Albion	0	(0)
2010	→ Yeovil Town (loan)	10	(0)
2010–2011	Peterborough United	22	(1)
2011–2012	Northampton Town	15	(4)
2012–2016	Exeter City	136	(10)
2016–2017	Accrington Stanley	4	(1)
Total		331	(39)

International career
2003	Wales U19	2	(0)
2004–2006	Wales U21	14	(4)
2006	Wales	1	(0)
- * Club domestic league appearances and goals

Arron Rhys Davies (born 22 June 1984) is a Welsh former professional footballer who played as a midfielder. He made one appearance for the Wales national team.

== Early life ==
Davies was brought up in Llantwit Major, where he attended Llantwit Major Comprehensive School.

== Club career ==
=== Southampton ===
Davies joined Southampton's Centre of Excellence at Bath before moving up to the Academy. He made his first appearance for the reserves in September 2001 and became a regular for the Saints reserves in the 2002–03 season after moving from the wing to a striking role. Between March and April 2003 he scored 4 times in 5 reserve games, which brought him to the attention of first team manager Gordon Strachan. Strachan named Davies in his initial 20-man squad for the 2003 FA Cup final, however he failed to make the bench. Davies also travelled to Bucharest for Saints' UEFA Cup tie.

Although seemingly on the verge of breaking into the senior team, Davies never made a first team appearance for Southampton. In February 2004, he went on loan to Second Division side Barnsley. On 14 February 2004 he made his debut for Barnsley in a 1–0 loss against Wrexham.

Davies was released by Southampton following the arrival of new manager Harry Redknapp in December 2004.

=== Yeovil Town ===
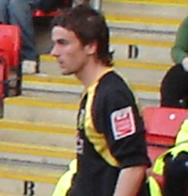
Davies playing for Yeovil Town in 2007

On 16 December 2004, Davies moved to League Two side Yeovil Town on a free transfer

On 18 December 2004, Davies scored the winning goal on his debut in a 3–2 victory over Leyton Orient. On 29 January 2005, Davies scored in a 3–2 loss against Charlton Athletic in the fourth round of the FA Cup.

In February 2005, Davies scored in four consecutive matches against Chester City, Scunthorpe United, Grimsby Town and Northampton Town. Yeovil finished the 2004–05 season as champions of League Two and won promotion to League One.

Davies blossomed during 2005–06, where he scored 8 goals in 39 appearances. On 4 March 2006, he scored a hat-trick against Chesterfield in a 3–0 victory. At the end of the season, Davies signed a new two-year contract with Yeovil, keeping him at the club until 2008.

In 2006–07, Davies scored 6 league goals. On 18 May 2007, he scored twice in Yeovil's 5–2 Football League One Play-off semi-final win against Nottingham Forest at the City Ground. His goals helped Yeovil to a 5–4 aggregate win. 27 May 2007, Yeovil lost 2–0 against Blackpool on in the League One Play-off Final.

=== Nottingham Forest ===
6 July 2007, Davies moved to League One side Nottingham Forest in a combined £1.2m deal with teammate Chris Cohen. On 6 July 2007, he signed a three-year contract.

Davies missed the start of the 2007–08 season due to injury. 30 October 2007, He made his debut as a substitute in a 0–0 draw against Oldham. He scored his first goal for the club in a 2–0 win against Crewe Alexandra. Unfortunately, injuries limited the number of appearances Davies made for The Reds. Forest finished the season in second place and won gained promotion to the Championship.

Davies' appearances were again limited due to injury during the 2008–09 season.

On 1 September 2009, Davies signed on loan with League One side Brighton & Hove Albion until the end of the year. However, after only 7 appearances, Brighton terminated his loan on 2 December 2009.

On 19 January 2010, Davies, along with James Reid, Aaron Mitchell and Joe Heath, had his contract terminated by mutual consent.

=== Return to Yeovil ===
In January 2010, a proposed move to join his former club, Yeovil Town, collapsed due to FIFA regulations which state that a player "may only play for two clubs in any one season where he has been on contract or a standard loan". This prevented Davies from signing for a third club during the season.

To avoid these regulations, Davies signed on non-contract terms with Brighton & Hove Albion on 11 February 2010. Once signed, he was loaned to Yeovil for the remainder of the season.

=== Peterborough United ===
On 9 July 2010, Davies was signed by former boss Gary Johnson for Peterborough United on a two-year contract.

On 7 August 2010, Davies made his debut in a 3–0 win against Bristol Rovers. On 4 September 2010, Davies sustained a hamstring injury in a 1–0 loss against Tranmere Rovers. He was sidelined for three weeks following the match.

On 2 November 2010, Davies scored his first goal in over three years in a 3–1 win over against Walsall. Peterborough were promoted to the Championship at the end of the season after beating Huddersfield 3–0 in the play-off final.

Davies was transfer listed and then had his contract terminated by mutual consent by new manager Darren Ferguson at the end of the 2010–11 season.

=== Northampton Town ===
On 30 June 2011, Davies was signed by Gary Johnson for a third time at League Two side Northampton Town.

On 6 August 2011, Davies made his debut for the club in a 0–0 draw against Accrington Stanley. On 20 August 2011, Davies scored his first goal in a 3–2 loss against Cheltenham Town.

Gary Johnson was sacked in mid-November 2011 and replaced by Aidy Boothroyd. Under Boothroyd, Davies' first team opportunities were limited.

On 4 July 2012, Davies had his contract terminated with Northampton Town by mutual consent.

=== Exeter City ===
On 5 July 2012, Davies signed with League Two side Exeter City.

On 19 October 2013, Davies scored a spectacular dipping long range effort from the sideline against Scunthorpe United in a 4–0 away victory. The goal was voted by Exeter supporters as the club's goal of the season.

Davies left Exeter at the end of the 2015–16 season after the club could not afford to offer him a new contract.

=== Accrington Stanley ===
On 1 August 2016, Davies joined fellow League Two side Accrington Stanley on a one-year contract. He scored his first goal for Accrington in a 2–1 loss to Exeter City on 20 August 2016.

== International career ==
Davies has represented his country at all levels including captaining Wales at under-21 level.

He earned his only senior international cap for Wales as a substitute in a 2–1 friendly victory against Trinidad and Tobago.

== Career statistics ==
=== Club ===
Appearances and goals by club, season and competition
Club	Season	League			FA Cup		League Cup		Other		Total	
Club	Season	Division	Apps	Goals	Apps	Goals	Apps	Goals	Apps	Goals	Apps	Goals
Southampton	2002–03	Premier League	0	0	0	0	0	0	—		0	0
Southampton	2003–04	Premier League	0	0	0	0	0	0	0	0	0	0
Southampton	2004–05	Premier League	0	0	0	0	0	0	—		0	0
Southampton	Total		0	0	0	0	0	0	0	0	0	0
Barnsley (loan)	2003–04	Second Division	4	0	0	0	0	0	0	0	4	0
Yeovil Town	2004–05	League Two	23	8	2	1	0	0	0	0	25	9
Yeovil Town	2005–06	League One	39	8	3	1	2	1	1 (Note: Appearance(s) in Football League Trophy)	0	45	10
Yeovil Town	2006–07	League One	39	6	1	0	1	0	4 (Note: Three appearances and two goals in the Football League One Play-offs and one appearance in the Football League Trophy)	2	45	8
Yeovil Town	Total		101	22	6	2	3	1	5	2	115	27
Nottingham Forest	2007–08	League One	19	1	3	0	0	0	0	0	22	1
Nottingham Forest	2008–09	Championship	13	0	2	0	1	0	—		16	0
Nottingham Forest	2009–10	Championship	0	0	0	0	2	0	0	0	2	0
Nottingham Forest	Total		32	1	5	0	3	0	0	0	40	1
Brighton & Hove Albion (loan)	2009–10	League One	7	0	0	0	0	0	1	0	8	0
Brighton & Hove Albion	2009–10	League One	0	0	0	0	0	0	0	0	0	0
Yeovil Town (loan)	2009–10	League One	10	0	0	0	0	0	0	0	10	0
Peterborough United	2010–11	League One	22	1	4	0	1	0	1	0	28	1
Northampton Town	2011–12	League Two	15	4	1	0	2	0	1	0	19	4
Exeter City	2012–13	League Two	37	3	0	0	1	0	0	0	38	3
Exeter City	2013–14	League Two	32	2	1	0	1	0	0	0	34	2
Exeter City	2014–15	League Two	39	4	1	0	1	0	1	0	42	4
Exeter City	2015–16	League Two	28	1	4	0	2	0	1	0	35	1
Exeter City	Total		136	10	6	0	5	0	2	0	148	10
Accrington Stanley	2016–17	League Two	4	1	2	0	2	0	2	0	10	1
Career totals			331	39	24	2	16	1	12	2	383	44

=== International ===
Appearances and goals by national team and year
National team	Year	Apps	Goals
Wales	2006	1	0
Total		1	0

== Honours ==
Yeovil Town

- Football League Two: 2004–05

Nottingham Forest

- Football League One second-place promotion: 2007–08
