= 2009–10 Nottingham Forest F.C. season =

English football club season

Nottingham Forest F.C.
2009–10 season
- Chairman: Nigel Doughty
- Manager: Billy Davies
- Football League Championship: 3rd
- Football League Championship play-offs: Semi-finals
- FA Cup: Third round
- League Cup: Third round
- Top goalscorer: League: Robert Earnshaw (17); All: Robert Earnshaw (17)
- Highest home attendance: 29 155 vs. Newcastle United (Championship, 17 October 2009)
- Lowest home attendance: 4 639 vs Bradford City (League Cup, 12 August 2009)
- Average home league attendance: 22,231
Home colours	Away colours

The 2009–10 season was Nottingham Forest's second season in the Football League Championship, following promotion from League One in the 2007–08 season, and after spending three years in the third tier.

== Team kit ==
Supplier: Umbro
Sponsor(s): Victor Chandler

Home	Away

Source: Wikipedia Nottingham Forest Article

== Club officials ==
Board of Directors

Role	Nat	Name
Chairman:	(England)	Nigel Doughty
Chief Executive:	(England)	Mark Arthur
Finance Director:	(England)	John Pelling
Associate Director:	(England)	Tim Farr

Technical staff

Role	Nat	Name
Manager:	(Scotland)	Billy Davies
Assistant Manager:	(Republic of Ireland)	David Kelly
Goalkeeping Coach:	(Wales)	Peter Williams
First Team Coach:	(England)	Julian Darby
Assistant First Team Coach:	(England)	Chris Fairclough
Head Physiotherapist:	(England)	Andrew Balderston
Physiotherapist:	(Northern Ireland)	Steve Devine
Physiotherapist:	(England)	Andy Hunt
Youth Academy Director:	(England)	Nick Marshall
Youth Academy Coach:	(England)	Russell Lovett
Youth Academy Coach:	(England)	Tony Cook
Head Academy Scout:	(Greece)	Tasos Makis
Medical Consultant:	(Republic of Ireland)	Dr Frank Coffey
Performance Coach:	(England)	Darren Robinson
Kit Manager:	(England)	Terry Farndale
Chief Scout:	(England)	Keith Burt
Football Analyst:	(England)	John Harrower
Club Consultant:	(England)	David Pleat

== Pre-season and friendlies ==
=== Summary ===
In preparation for the 2009–10 campaign, Forest released seven fringe players. Richard Tait, Hamza Bencherif, Liam Hook, Tom Sharpe, Ryan Whitehurst, Emile Sinclair and Paddy Gamble were all released with Sinclair the only player to make first team appearances. Ian Breckin was also told he would play no part next season. Another three fringe players were given new contracts, Mickael Darnet, Shane Redmond and Arron Mitchell. Forest then signed three players in two days in late June. Striker David McGoldrick signed for £1m from Southampton, whilst fellow striker Dele Adebola rejected a new contract offer from Bristol City to sign a two-year deal for The Reds As well as this, winger Paul Anderson signed a three-year deal for £250,000 from Liverpool, after spending the previous season on loan at The Reds. Goalkeeper Lee Camp became Forest's fourth signing of the summer on 3 July, signing for £150,000 from QPR, with the highly rated keeper committing himself to a four-year deal with the club. Youngsters Shane Redmond and James Reid headed out of the City Ground for six-month loans to Burton Albion and Rushden & Diamonds respectively on 7 July. Forest announced a day later that their shirt sponsors for the season would be gaming company Victor Chandler, with the one-year contract seeing Forest receive a substantial six-figure sum. On Thursday 16 July, Forest announced their full list of squad numbers for the 09/10 season.

The Reds then kicked off their pre-season campaign with a 1–0 victory over Portuguese outfit Sporting CP, with Paul Anderson netting the winner in the 79th minute for Forest. A week later Forest sent out two teams to play Burton Albion and Ilkeston Town. The first team beat Burton 4–1 with McGoldrick netting his first goal and Tyson bagging a hat-trick, whilst a young and inexperienced team lost 2–1 to Ilkeston, Tim Hopkinson scoring a late consolation penalty. On 20 July Nottingham Forest completed the signings of Chris Gunter and Paul McKenna for £1.75 million and £750,000 respectively. Mark Byrne was also sent out on loan to Rushden and Diamonds for six months. On 21 July a deal was completed to bring back Joel Lynch, who spent a large amount of time on loan at Forest last season. Along with Forest's payment of around £200,000, Matt Thornhill was sent out on loan to Brighton & Hove Albion for 6 months. On 22 July Forest signed Dexter Blackstock from QPR for on a 4-year deal. This bolstered Davies' attacking options to six strikers. They continued their spending on the 22nd by bringing in Polish Midfielder Radoslaw Majewski on a season-long loan deal with an option to buy him included. Later that day Forest sent two teams out in pre-season friendlies, one to face Rotherham United, the other to face Rushden and Diamonds. The first team squad was mixed between the 2 matches as one side beat Rotherham 1–0 with Earnshaw's first goal of the pre-season while the other drew 1–1 with Diamonds thanks to a goal from Majewski on his debut scored after just 90 seconds. Three days later was the traditional match between Forest and local rivals Notts County, who has just been taken over by the Munto Finance group. The result was 2–1 to County despite late pressure from Forest that saw McGugan get a goal, this surprised many people who had expected Forest to easily win. Forest finished their pre-season fixtures with two impressive results at home against Premier League opposition. The first a 1–1 draw against Stoke City and the second, two days later, a 2–1 victory against Birmingham City.

=== Results ===
Date	Opponents	H / A	Result F–A	Scorers	Attendance	Ref.
12 July 2009	Sporting CP	A	1–0	Anderson 79'	—	
18 July 2009	Burton Albion	A	4–1	McGoldrick 28', Tyson (3) 46', 53', 56'	2,013	
18 July 2009	Ilkeston Town	A	1–2	Hopkinson (pen.)	—	
22 July 2009	Rotherham United	A	1–0	Earnshaw 7'	1,223	
22 July 2009	Rushden and Diamonds	A	1–1	Majewski 2'	—	
25 July 2009	Notts County	A	1–2	McGugan 73'	12,040	
29 July 2009	Stoke City	H	1–1	McGoldrick 30'	5,542	
1 August 2009	Birmingham City	H	2–1	McGoldrick 41', Earnshaw 82'	6,735	

== Football League Championship ==
=== Summary ===
Forest began the season with a 0–0 draw at Reading, the same as their previous season. Forest then picked up their first win of the season a few days later with a 3–0 victory in the League Cup over League Two Bradford City, with Paul Anderson, Dexter Blackstock and Lewis McGugan all getting their names onto the scoresheet. However, their first home league game of the season ended in a 1–0 defeat to West Bromwich Albion, due to an own goal by Wes Morgan and Robert Earnshaw missed a penalty for Forest. Forest then suffered their second home defeat of the week, a 4–2 loss against Watford. The following Saturday saw Forest pick up a point in a 1–1 draw away to Q.P.R, with a goal from David McGoldrick in the second half. The next fixture was a midweek League Cup tie against Middlesbrough at the City Ground. Forest won 2–1 after extra time, after Chambers scored from a corner in the 60th minute and Radoslaw Majewski scored his first goal for Forest in the 103 minute. Next up was the East Midlands derby against rivals Derby County. Forest were looking to beat Derby for the first time since 2003, and they got off to a perfect start when Majewski fired the Reds in front after just 58 seconds. Forest made it 2–0 after 28 minutes, Dexter Blackstock with the goal. Nathan Tyson made it 3–0, just three minutes before half time. However Derby were not done yet when a Wes Morgan own goal and Jake Livermore goal had Derby back into the game. Forest held onto the win but it was after the game that made the headlines with Nathan Tyson celebrating the win by parading a corner flag, emblazoned with the Forest emblem, across the away fans. Tyson, and Forest as a whole, argued that the gesture was celebratory and the move across the away fans was so Tyson could salute the home fans above and at the other end of the away end. The Derby contingent disagreed, believing that the gesture was inflammatory. Derby players and staff clashed with Forest players and staff. The FA charged Forest and Derby with "failing to control their players", while Tyson was charged with improper conduct. Tyson pleaded guilty to his charge, as did Derby. Forest pleaded not guilty. The FA fined Forest £25,000 and Derby £20,000, with £10,000 suspended for both. Tyson was fined £5,000 and given a two-game ban which was suspended.

September started with consecutive 1–1 draws against Sheffield Wednesday and Ipswich Town. However Forest were then up against high-flying Blackpool and suffered a 1–0 defeat before going out of the League Cup by the same scoreline to Blackburn Rovers. But a 1–0 win over struggling Plymouth Argyle gave Forest a new lease of life and they made it consecutive wins after a 2–0 win over Scunthorpe United. In October, Forest moved up to 10th place, their highest position in the Football League since the 2003/04 season, after a 2–1 victory over Darren Ferguson's, Peterborough United. Forest then defeated Newcastle United, who were then in second place in the table, at home to gain their fourth consecutive win and consign the Toon to only their second defeat of the season. An injury-time winner from Guy Moussi saw Forest to their fifth-consecutive win, against Barnsley at home. However, after this Moussi was sent off for a second bookable offence, for celebrating with the Forest fans in the Trent End. Forest ended the month with a 1–1 draw away at Crystal Palace after coming from behind. November started where October left off with two 1–1 draws against Cardiff City and Bristol City. Lewis McGugan rescued a point with an injury-time equaliser against Cardiff, with Wes Morgan scoring a late goal against Bristol City, who pulled level later in the game. The next match saw Forest play Middlesbrough away. An early goal from the home team saw Forest on the back foot but a free kick in second half from Robert Earnshaw saw Forest to their fourth-successive 1–1 draw. The week after Forest introduced a 'mixed area' of fans, where fans of both Forest and Doncaster could sit together. After selling out this allocation, they went on to record their biggest win of the season, at that stage, with a 4–1 victory. This also saw Nicky Shorey make his debut for the Reds. Forest kick started December with an impressive 5–1 victory over East Midlands rivals Leicester City, including a Robert Earnshaw hat-trick. Forest then claimed a draw at Sheffield United before going to win at Swansea City and beat Preston at home, Billy Davies' and Paul McKenna's former club who scored the first goal. The Christmas period saw Forest get a draw away at Watford and a win at home against Coventry City. January began with a very important win over promotion rivals West Bromwich Albion. Blackstock, Majewski and Cohen all got on the scoresheet as the Reds won 3–1 to help them leap frog West Brom into second place. The month continued to be good as Forest beat Reading 2–1 and thumped QPR 5–0 at home to help them stay in second place. However the month ended in disaster as Forest lost away for the first time in the season to local rivals Derby County 1–0. This saw their 19-game unbeaten run come to an end. This, coupled with the FA Cup exit, saw mixed emotions through the month. Forest bounced back in February with a win at home to Sheffield Wednesday, thanks to a Dexter Blackstock brace, which saw Forest's impressive home record continue. However, the defeat to Derby away had had its effects. Two away defeats on the bounce to Coventry City and Doncaster Rovers saw the Reds slip down to third, despite being unbeaten away for the earlier parts of the season. Home wins against Sheffield United and Middlesbrough saw Forest back up to 3rd but their away form took another blow as they lost to Leicester City 3–0 away. March began with an injury time winner from Luke Chambers against Swansea City at home saw Forest mount a push to keep the pressure on second placed WBA but away defeats against Preston North End and Barnsley dented these hopes. A 4th consecutive 1–0 win at home, against Peterborough United, and a 2–0 win against Crystal Palace saw Forest equal Brian Clough's record of twelve consecutive home wins but it was not enough though as West Bromwich Albion got further away in the promotion push. A 7th consecutive away defeat, against table topping Newcastle United, saw most fans condemn themselves to the playoffs and West Brom pulled away even further. April saw Forest gained their first away point in three months against Bristol City thanks to a finish from outside the box from Guy Moussi to draw 1–1. Forest's draw at home to Cardiff 2 days later meant Newcastle were confirmed of promotion. Forest then got an impressive win against Ipswich at home which saw them qualify for the playoffs, but also meant West Brom gained the final automatic promotion place. The following week Forest played Blackpool away, the last team to beat them at home back in September. With Forest already qualified for the playoffs, the starting 11 saw many fringe players in, which saw Forest go on to lose 3–1 with Joe Garner getting the consolation, his first of the season. Forest's last home game of the season was against already relegated Plymouth Argyle, where Forest won 3–0. Forest ended the season with a 2–2 draw, playing Scunthorpe United away.

=== Results ===
Date	Opponents	H / A	Result F–A	Scorers	Attendance	League position	Ref.
8 August 2009	Reading	A	0–0		19,640	17th	
15 August 2009	West Bromwich Albion	H	0–1		22,794	20th	
18 August 2009	Watford	H	2–4	Blackstock 45'+2', Adebola 87'	19,232	22nd	
22 August 2009	Queens Park Rangers	A	1–1	McGoldrick 57'	13,058	20th	
29 August 2009	Derby County	H	3–2	Majewski 1', Blackstock 28', Tyson 42'	28,143	16th	
12 September 2009	Sheffield Wednesday	A	1–1	Blackstock 2'	25,270	16th	
15 September 2009	Ipswich Town	A	1–1	Earnshaw 59'	21,130	16th	
19 September 2009	Blackpool	H	0–1		23,487	18th	
25 September 2009	Plymouth Argyle	A	1–0	Gunter 45'+2'	14,792	17th	
30 September 2009	Scunthorpe United	H	2–0	Chambers 71', Blackstock 76'	18,332	14th	
3 October 2009	Peterborough United	A	2–1	Majewski 51', Anderson 56'	12,711	10th	
17 October 2009	Newcastle United	H	1–0	Blackstock 45'	29,155	7th	
20 October 2009	Barnsley	H	1–0	Moussi 90'+4'	20,395	7th	
24 October 2009	Crystal Palace	A	1–1	McGoldrick 48'	15,692	9th	
1 November 2009	Cardiff City	A	1–1	McGugan 90'+1	20,413	9th	
7 November 2009	Bristol City	H	1–1	Morgan 85'	21,467	8th	
21 November 2009	Middlesbrough	A	1–1	Earnshaw 73'	22,710	9th	
28 November 2009	Doncaster Rovers	H	4–1	Roberts 17' (o.g.), Morgan 59', Earnshaw 77', McGugan 80'	22,035	4th	
5 December 2009	Leicester City	H	5–1	Earnshaw (3) 12', 32', 49', Anderson 54', Adebola 77'	28,626	3rd	
8 December 2009	Sheffield United	A	0–0		26,490	4th	
12 December 2009	Swansea City	A	1–0	McGoldrick 35'	16,690	4th	
19 December 2009	Preston North End	H	3–0	McKenna 16', Adebola 25', McGugan 81'	21,582	3rd	
26 December 2009	Watford	A	0–0		17,086	3rd	
28 December 2009	Coventry City	H	2–0	Earnshaw 42', Blackstock 78'	28,608	3rd	
8 January 2010	West Bromwich Albion	A	3–1	Blackstock 18', Majewski 53', Cohen 56'	22,873	2nd	
16 January 2010	Reading	H	2–1	Anderson 11', Earnshaw 41'	27,635	2nd	
26 January 2010	Queens Park Rangers	H	5–0	Earnshaw (2) 18', 21', Blackstock 32' (pen.), Cohen 49', Perch 78'	23,293	2nd	
30 January 2010	Derby County	A	0–1		32,674	2nd	
6 February 2010	Sheffield Wednesday	H	2–1	Blackstock (2) 24' (pen.), 80'	27,900	3rd	
9 February 2010	Coventry City	A	0–1		18,225	3rd	
13 February 2010	Doncaster Rovers	A	0–1		12,768	3rd	
16 February 2010	Sheffield United	H	1–0	Earnshaw 4'	22,076	3rd	
20 February 2010	Middlesbrough	H	1–0	Cohen 72'	25,498	2nd	
27 February 2010	Leicester City	A	0–3		31,759	3rd	
6 March 2010	Swansea City	H	1–0	Chambers 90+1'	25,012	3rd	
13 March 2010	Preston North End	A	2–3	Blackstock 57' (pen.), Earnshaw 76'	14,226	3rd	
16 March 2010	Barnsley	A	1–2	Blackstock 78'	13,174	3rd	
20 March 2010	Peterborough United	H	1–0	Earnshaw 13'	24,582	3rd	
23 March 2010	Crystal Palace	H	2–0	Morgan 45+3', Tyson 82'	20,025	3rd	
29 March 2010	Newcastle United	A	0–2		45,987	3rd	
3 April 2010	Bristol City	A	1–1	Moussi 29'	16,125	3rd	
5 April 2010	Cardiff City	H	0–0		22.185	3rd	
10 April 2010	Ipswich Town	H	3–0	Chambers 47', Moussi 57', Earnshaw 76'	23,459	3rd	
17 April 2010	Blackpool	A	1–3	Garner 65'	11,164	3rd	
24 April 2010	Plymouth Argyle	H	3–0	Earnshaw 19', N'Gala 34' (o.g.), Anderson 90+3'	22,602	3rd	
2 May 2010	Scunthorpe United	A	2–2	Garner 17', Boyd 43'	8,119	3rd	

==== Results by round ====
Round	1	2	3	4	5	6	7	8	9	10	11	12	13	14	15	16	17	18	19	20	21	22	23	24	25	26	27	28	29	30	31	32	33	34	35	36	37	38	39	40	41	42	43	44	45	46
Ground	A	H	H	A	H	A	A	H	A	H	A	H	H	A	A	H	A	H	H	A	A	H	A	H	A	H	H	A	H	A	A	H	H	A	H	A	A	H	H	A	A	H	H	A	H	A
Result	D	L	L	D	W	D	D	L	W	W	W	W	W	D	D	D	D	W	W	D	W	W	D	W	W	W	W	L	W	L	L	W	W	L	W	L	L	W	W	L	D	D	W	L	W	D
Position	17	20	22	20	16	16	16	18	17	14	10	7	7	9	9	8	9	4	3	4	4	3	3	3	2	2	2	2	3	3	3	3	2	3	3	3	3	3	3	3	3	3	3	3	3	3

A = Away; H = Home; W = Win; D = Draw; L = Loss

=== League table ===
Pos	Team	Pld	W	D	L	GF	GA	GD	Pts	Promotion, qualification or relegation
1	Newcastle United (C, P)	46	30	12	4	90	35	+55	102	Promotion to the Premier League
2	West Bromwich Albion (P)	46	26	13	7	89	48	+41	91	Promotion to the Premier League
3	Nottingham Forest	46	22	13	11	65	40	+25	79	Qualification for Championship play-offs
4	Cardiff City	46	22	10	14	73	54	+19	76	Qualification for Championship play-offs
5	Leicester City	46	21	13	12	61	45	+16	76	Qualification for Championship play-offs

Source: The Football League
Rules for classification: 1) points; 2) goal difference; 3) number of goals scored.
(C) Champions; (P) Promoted

== Coca-Cola Championship Playoffs ==
=== Summary ===
Forest qualified for the playoffs after finishing third. Since Blackpool finished sixth it meant they drew each other in the semi-finals, with Cardiff City and Leicester City contesting the other semi. The first leg was at Blackpool's Bloomfield Road ground. Forest started brightly with a superb goal from Chris Cohen from the corner of the area, before Blackpool replied with two goals meaning they took a 2–1 advantage into the second leg. Forest once again started brightly, with Earnshaw levelling the scores on aggregate after 7 minutes. In the second half Blackpool took an aggregate lead, but then Earnshaw levelled again. However, Blackpool then went on to score three more in quick succession. Adebola scored a late consolation in stoppage time, but it was not enough and Forest were knocked out.

=== Results ===
Date	Round	Opponents	H / A	Result F–A	Scorers	Referee	Attendance	Ref.
8 May 2010	Semi-Final–1st Leg	Blackpool	A	1–2	Cohen 13'	Phil Dowd	11,805	
11 May 2010	Semi-Final–2nd Leg	Blackpool	H	3–4	Earnshaw (2) 7', 66', Adebola 90+2'	Mark Clattenburg	28,358	

== League Cup ==
=== Summary ===
Forest were drawn against Bradford City at home, in the First Round of the League Cup. Bradford had lost 5–0 to Forest neighbours Notts County just a few days before and their poor luck continued as they went on to lose 3–0 thanks to goals from Paul Anderson, Dexter Blackstock and Lewis Mcgugan. The Second Round saw Forest get drawn against nearly relegated Middlesbrough. This would prove a tough test for Forest. Forest in at half time losing 1–0. However, after the break Luke Chambers gained a valuable equaliser which saw the match go into extra time. Then in the first period of extra time, Polish international Radosław Majewski bagged a winner to send Forest into the Third Round. Forest were drawn at home again, this time to Premier League side Blackburn Rovers. Forest could not continue their cup run and went on to lose 1–0.

=== Results ===
Date	Round	Opponents	H / A	Result F–A	Scorers	Attendance	Ref.
12 August 2009	Round One	Bradford City	H	3–0	Anderson 47', Blackstock 60', McGugan 82'	4,639	
25 August 2009	Round Two	Middlesbrough	H	2–1	Chambers 60', Majewski 103'	8,838	
22 September 2009	Round Three	Blackburn Rovers	H	0–1		11,553	

== FA Cup ==
=== Summary ===
Forest started in the Third Round of the FA Cup, due to them being in the Championship. They were drawn against Premier League Birmingham City. Both sides had very impressive unbeaten runs going into the fixture. The match saw a closely contested match with Joe Hart keeping Birmingham in the competition on more than one occasion. In the second half Forest won a penalty, however this saw Robert Earnshaw blaze it over the bar. The match finished 0–0 meaning a replay at St Andrew's. The match was again closely contested, but this time Birmingham edged the win, defeating Forest 1–0.

=== Results ===
Date	Round	Opponents	H / A	Result F–A	Scorers	Referee	Attendance	Ref.
2 January 2010	Round Three	Birmingham City	H	0–0		Steve Bennett	20,975	
12 January 2010	Round Three–Replay	Birmingham City	A	0–1		Kevin Friend	9,399	

== Squad statistics ==
=== Appearances and goals ===
The statistics for the following players are for their time during 2009–10 season playing for Nottingham Forest. Any stats from a different club during 2009–10 are not included.

- Nottingham Forest have also had two own-goals scored for them during 2009–10
- Includes all statistics from the Coca-Cola Championship Play-offs

No.	Pos	Nat	Player	Total		Championship		FA Cup		League Cup	
No.	Pos	Nat	Player	Apps	Goals	Apps	Goals	Apps	Goals	Apps	Goals
1	GK	(Northern Ireland) NIR	Lee Camp	49	0	47	0	2	0	0	0
2	DF	(England) ENG	James Perch	21	1	16+3	1	2	0	0	0
3	DF	(England) ENG	Nicky Shorey	9	0	9	0	0	0	0	0
4	DF	(England) ENG	Luke Chambers	26	4	17+6	3	2	0	1	1
5	DF	(England) ENG	Wes Morgan	51	3	46	3	2	0	3	0
6	DF	(England) ENG	Kelvin Wilson	38	0	37	0	0	0	1	0
7	MF	(England) ENG	Paul Anderson	44	5	34+5	4	1+1	0	2+1	1
8	MF	(England) ENG	Lewis McGugan	22	4	6+13	3	1	0	1+1	1
9	FW	(Nigeria) NGA	Dele Adebola	38	4	13+21	4	1+1	0	0+2	0
10	FW	(Wales) WAL	Robert Earnshaw	37	17	21+13	17	1	0	2	0
11	FW	(England) ENG	Nathan Tyson	40	2	19+16	2	1+1	0	2+1	0
12	MF	(England) ENG	Garath McCleary	27	0	1+23	0	1+1	0	1	0
14	FW	(England) ENG	Joe Garner	21	2	14+4	2	0+1	0	1+1	0
15	MF	(England) ENG	Chris Cohen	51	4	46	4	2	0	3	0
16	DF	(Wales) WAL	Chris Gunter	50	1	46	1	1+1	0	2	0
17	FW	(England) ENG	David McGoldrick	38	3	18+17	3	1	0	0+2	0
18	MF	(England) ENG	Paul McKenna	41	1	37	1	1	0	2+1	0
19	MF	(France) FRA	Guy Moussi	28	3	21+6	3	1	0	0	0
20	MF	(Wales) WAL	Arron Davies	2	0	0	0	0	0	2	0
20	MF	(Scotland) SCO	George Boyd	6	1	5+1	1	0	0	0	0
21	GK	(England) ENG	Paul Smith	4	0	1	0	0	0	3	0
23	FW	(England) ENG	Dexter Blackstock	45	13	32+9	12	1	0	3	1
28	MF	(Poland) POL	Radosław Majewski	40	4	33+4	3	1	0	2	1
29	DF	(England) ENG	Julian Bennett	0	0	0	0	0	0	0	0
33	DF	(England) ENG	Joel Lynch	12	0	9+1	0	0	0	2	0
35	DF	(England) ENG	Aaron Mitchell	0	0	0	0	0	0	0	0
36	FW	(France) FRA	Mikael Darnet	0	0	0	0	0	0	0	0
37	DF	(Republic of Ireland) IRL	Brendan Moloney	0	0	0	0	0	0	0	0
38	GK	(England) ENG	Karl Darlow	0	0	0	0	0	0	0	0
39	DF	(England) ENG	Jordan Fairclough	0	0	0	0	0	0	0	0

=== Top scorers ===
Includes all competitive matches. The list is sorted by league goals when total goals are equal.

Last updated on 11 May 2010

Position	Nation	Number	Name	Championship	League Cup	FA Cup	Total
1	(Wales)	10	Robert Earnshaw	17	0	0	17
2	(England)	23	Dexter Blackstock	12	1	0	13
3	(England)	7	Paul Anderson	4	1	0	5
4	(Nigeria)	9	Dele Adebola	4	0	0	4
=	(England)	15	Chris Cohen	4	0	0	4
=	(England)	8	Lewis McGugan	3	1	0	4
=	(Poland)	28	Radosław Majewski	3	1	0	4
=	(England)	4	Luke Chambers	3	1	0	4
9	(England)	17	David McGoldrick	3	0	0	3
=	(England)	5	Wes Morgan	3	0	0	3
=	(France)	19	Guy Moussi	3	0	0	3
12	(England)	11	Nathan Tyson	2	0	0	2
=	(England)	14	Joe Garner	2	0	0	2
14	(Wales)	16	Chris Gunter	1	0	0	1
=	(England)	18	Paul McKenna	1	0	0	1
=	(England)	2	James Perch	1	0	0	1
=	(Scotland)	20	George Boyd	1	0	0	1
			Own Goals	2	0	0	2
			TOTALS	69	5	0	74

=== Disciplinary record ===
Includes all competitive matches. Players with 1 card or more included only.

Last updated on 11 May 2010

Position	Nation	Number	Name	Championship			League Cup			FA Cup			Total		
Position	Nation	Number	Name	Y	YY	R	Y	YY	R	Y	YY	R	Y	YY	R
GK	(Northern Ireland)	1	Lee Camp	3	0	0	0	0	0	0	0	0	3	0	0
DF	(England)	2	James Perch	6	0	0	0	0	0	0	0	0	6	0	0
DF	(England)	3	Nicky Shorey	1	0	1	0	0	0	0	0	0	1	0	1
DF	(England)	4	Luke Chambers	2	0	1	0	0	0	0	0	0	2	0	1
DF	(England)	5	Wes Morgan	8	0	0	0	0	0	0	0	0	8	0	0
DF	(England)	6	Kelvin Wilson	5	0	0	0	0	0	0	0	0	5	0	0
MF	(England)	7	Paul Anderson	3	0	0	0	0	0	0	0	0	3	0	0
MF	(England)	8	Lewis McGugan	1	0	0	0	0	0	0	0	0	1	0	0
FW	(Nigeria)	9	Dele Adebola	2	0	0	0	0	0	0	0	0	2	0	0
FW	(Wales)	10	Robert Earnshaw	4	0	0	0	0	0	0	0	0	4	0	0
FW	(England)	11	Nathan Tyson	5	0	0	0	0	0	0	0	0	5	0	0
MF	(England)	12	Garath McCleary	2	0	1	0	0	0	0	0	0	2	0	1
FW	(England)	14	Joe Garner	5	0	0	1	0	0	0	0	0	6	0	0
MF	(England)	15	Chris Cohen	8	0	0	0	0	0	0	0	0	8	0	0
DF	(Wales)	16	Chris Gunter	7	0	0	1	0	0	1	0	0	9	0	0
FW	(England)	17	David McGoldrick	3	0	0	0	0	0	1	0	0	4	0	0
MF	(England)	18	Paul McKenna	8	0	0	0	0	0	0	0	0	8	0	0
MF	(France)	19	Guy Moussi	2	1	0	0	0	0	0	0	0	2	1	0
FW	(England)	23	Dexter Blackstock	5	0	0	0	0	0	0	0	0	5	0	0
MF	(Poland)	28	Radosław Majewski	8	0	0	0	0	0	0	0	0	8	0	0
DF	(England)	33	Joel Lynch	1	0	0	0	0	0	0	0	0	1	0	0
			TOTALS	89	1	3	2	0	0	2	0	0	93	1	3

== Transfers ==
=== In ===
#	Pos	Player	From	Fee	Date
17	FW	(England) David McGoldrick	(England) Southampton	£1 million	29 June 2009
7	MF	(England) Paul Anderson	(England) Liverpool	£250,000	30 June 2009
9	FW	(Nigeria) Dele Adebola	(England) Bristol City	Free	1 July 2009
1	GK	(Northern Ireland) Lee Camp	(England) Queens Park Rangers	Undisclosed	3 July 2009
16	DF	(Wales) Chris Gunter	(England) Tottenham Hotspur	£1.75 million	20 July 2009
18	MF	(England) Paul McKenna	(England) Preston North End	£750,000	20 July 2009
33	MF	(England) Joel Lynch	(England) Brighton and Hove Albion	£200,000	21 July 2009
23	FW	(England) Dexter Blackstock	(England) Queens Park Rangers	Undisclosed	22 July 2009

=== Out ===
#	Pos	Player	To	Fee	Date
	FW	(England) Emile Sinclair	(England) Macclesfield Town	Free	15 May 2009
	FW	(England) Ryan Whitehurst	(England) Eastwood Town	Free	15 May 2009
	MF	(England) Liam Hook	(England) Stamford	Released	15 May 2009
	DF	(Algeria) Hamza Bencherif	(England) Macclesfield Town	Free	15 May 2009
	DF	(England) Tom Sharpe	(England) Kidderminster Harriers	Released	15 May 2009
	GK	(England) Paddy Gamble	(England) Alfreton Town	Released	15 May 2009
	DF	(Scotland) Richard Tait	(England) Tamworth	Free	15 May 2009
	DF	(England) Ian Breckin	(England) Chesterfield	Free	15 May 2009
20	MF	(Wales) Arron Davies	(England) Brighton and Hove Albion	Free	19 January 2010
	DF	(England) Joe Heath	(England) Exeter City	Free	19 January 2010
35	DF	(England) Aaron Mitchell	(England) Tamworth	Free	19 January 2010
	MF	(England) James Reid	(England) Lincoln City	Free	19 January 2010

=== Loans in ===
#	Pos	Player	From	Start	End
28	MF	(Poland) Radosław Majewski	(Poland) Polonia Warszawa	22 July 2009	1 June 2010
3	DF	(England) Nicky Shorey	(England) Aston Villa	24 November 2009	28 January 2010
20	MF	(Scotland) George Boyd	(England) Peterborough United	2 March 2010	1 June 2010

=== Loans out ===
#	Pos	Player	To	Start	End
	DF	(England) Joe Heath	(England) Lincoln City	26 June 2009	4 January 2010
37	DF	(Republic of Ireland) Brendan Moloney	(England) Notts County	1 July 2009	4 January 2010
	GK	(Republic of Ireland) Shane Redmond	(England) Burton Albion	7 July 2009	1 January 2010
	MF	(England) James Reid	(England) Rushden and Diamonds	7 July 2009	1 January 2010
	MF	(Republic of Ireland) Mark Byrne	(England) Rushden and Diamonds	20 July 2009	1 June 2010
	MF	(England) Matt Thornhill	(England) Brighton and Hove Albion	21 July 2009	1 June 2010
20	MF	(Wales) Arron Davies	(England) Brighton and Hove Albion	1 September 2009	4 January 2010
35	DF	(England) Aaron Mitchell	(England) Ilkeston Town	30 October 2009	30 November 2009
	MF	(England) Matt Thornhill	(England) Cheltenham Town	21 January 2010	21 February 2010
	GK	(Republic of Ireland) Shane Redmond	(England) Darlington	26 January 2010	1 June 2010
37	DF	(Republic of Ireland) Brendan Moloney	(England) Scunthorpe United	27 January 2010	27 February 2010
