= Lee Camp (footballer) =

British footballer (born 1984)

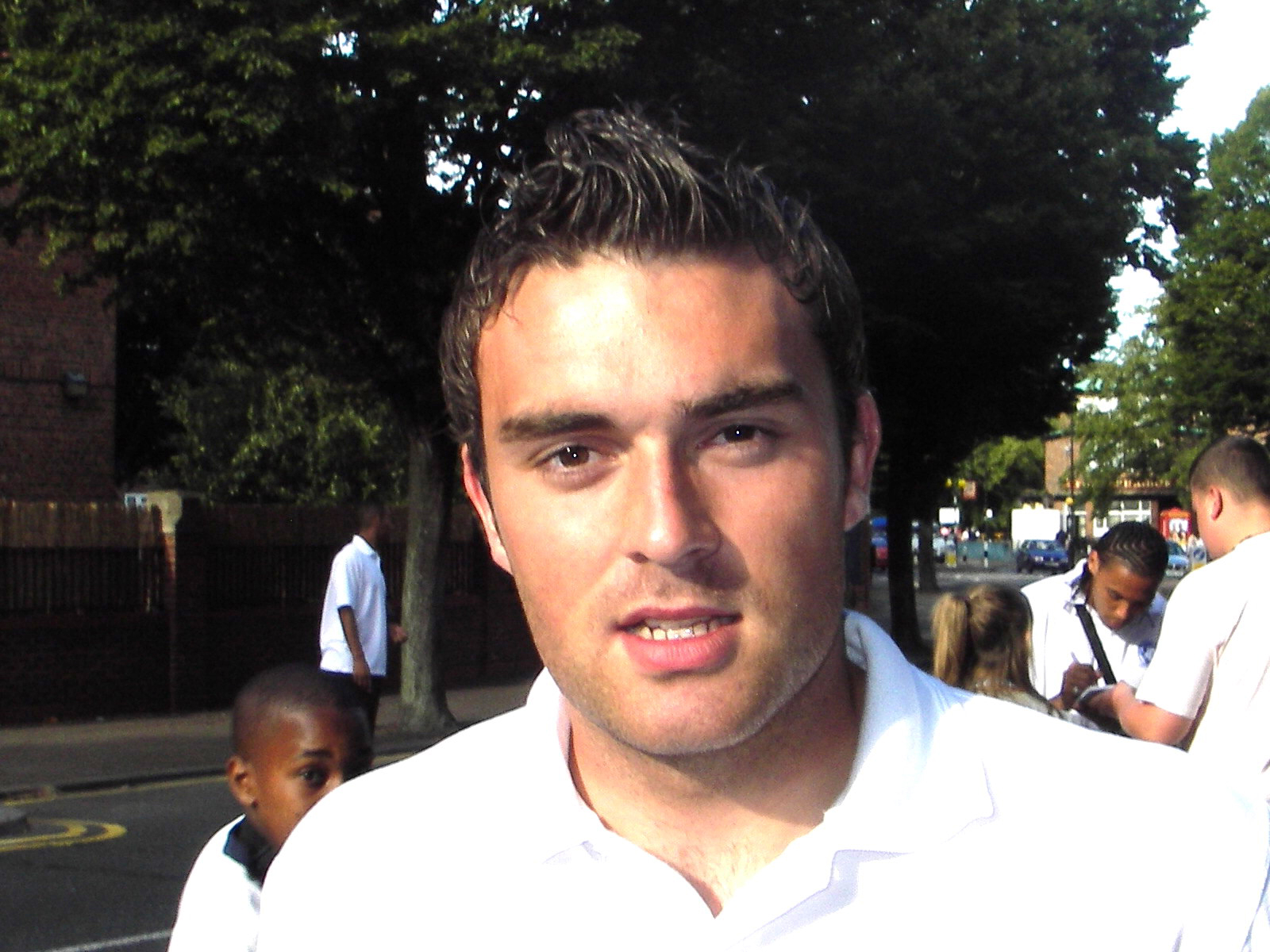
- Camp in 2007

Personal information
- Full name: Lee Michael John Camp
- Date of birth: 22 August 1984 (age 42)
- Place of birth: Derby, England
- Height: 6 ft 0 in (1.83 m)
- Position: Goalkeeper

Youth career
- –2002: Derby County

Senior career*
Years	Team	Apps	(Gls)
2002–2007	Derby County	89	(0)
2003	→ Burton Albion (loan)	5	(0)
2004	→ Queens Park Rangers (loan)	12	(0)
2006	→ Norwich City (loan)	3	(0)
2007	→ Queens Park Rangers (loan)	11	(0)
2007–2009	Queens Park Rangers	50	(0)
2008–2009	→ Nottingham Forest (loan)	15	(0)
2009–2013	Nottingham Forest	163	(0)
2013	Norwich City	3	(0)
2013–2014	West Bromwich Albion	0	(0)
2013–2014	→ AFC Bournemouth (loan)	11	(0)
2014–2015	AFC Bournemouth	31	(0)
2015–2017	Rotherham United	59	(0)
2017–2018	Cardiff City	0	(0)
2018	→ Sunderland (loan)	12	(0)
2018–2020	Birmingham City	80	(0)
2020–2021	Coventry City	0	(0)
2021	Swindon Town	11	(0)
2022	Clitheroe	2	(0)
2022	Wrexham	0	(0)
Total		555	(0)

International career
2004–2007	England U21	5	(0)
2011–2012	Northern Ireland	9	(0)
- * Club domestic league appearances and goals

Lee Michael John Camp (born 22 August 1984) is a former professional footballer who played as a goalkeeper. After a spell as a youth coach at Blackpool, he became Professional Development Phase Coach at Accrington Stanley.

Camp started his professional career with Derby County in 2002, having progressed through the club's youth ranks. During a five-year spell at the club, he made 89 league appearances for Derby, and also went on loan to three clubs: Burton Albion in 2003, Queens Park Rangers in 2004 and 2007, and Norwich City, in 2006. He switched to Queens Park Rangers in July 2007, and made 50 league appearances for the club in a two-season spell, taking his total number of QPR appearances to 73. Between October 2008 and January 2009, Camp was loaned to Nottingham Forest, signing permanently for the club in July 2009. In total, he made 182 league appearances for Nottingham Forest before returning to Norwich City in January 2013. He made three appearances in his second spell at the club, before being released on a free transfer in May 2013.

Camp joined West Bromwich Albion in September 2013 and spent two months on loan at AFC Bournemouth. He was released by West Brom in January 2014 and subsequently joined Bournemouth on a two-and-a-half-year deal, but left after one year for Rotherham United, where he was a regular for 18 months until an injured knee kept him out for the rest of his contract. He then joined Cardiff City, but never played, and spent time on loan at Sunderland before signing for Birmingham City, where he spent two seasons as first choice. He had a short non-playing spell at Coventry City as injury cover before spending the last two months of the 2020–21 season with Swindon Town. He had brief spells with non-league clubs Clitheroe and Wrexham in 2022.

Camp was born in England, and played for the England under-21 team; at senior international level, he made nine appearances for Northern Ireland, for which he was eligible through his Northern Ireland-born grandfather.

== Club career ==
=== Derby County ===
He made his first appearance with Derby County during the 2002–03 season, and joined Burton Albion on loan in January 2003. At the end of the same season, he went to Queens Park Rangers for the last few games also on loan, where he helped the club reach promotion to Division One. In Derby's end-of-season awards, he won both the Sammy Crooks Young Player of the Year award and the Brian Clough Player of the Year award. Camp joined Norwich City on 7 September 2006, on a three-month loan with effect from 8 September, covering an injury to Joe Lewis. Camp made his first Norwich City full debut on 28 November 2006 against Leicester City. He kept his place for the following match against Sheffield Wednesday where he scored an own goal in a 2–1 defeat.

=== Queens Park Rangers ===
Camp joined Queens Park Rangers ("QPR") on a three-month loan deal on 12 February 2007, having helped the club achieve promotion in 2004 in a similar loan deal. He returned to Derby early, on 25 April 2007, after a suspension to Stephen Bywater left the Rams short of goalkeepers.

Camp was transferred to QPR on 27 July 2007, after long negotiations, for a fee of £300,000. He agreed a three-year deal with the club. Camp was the only QPR player to start in every league fixture of the 2007–08 season.

=== Nottingham Forest ===
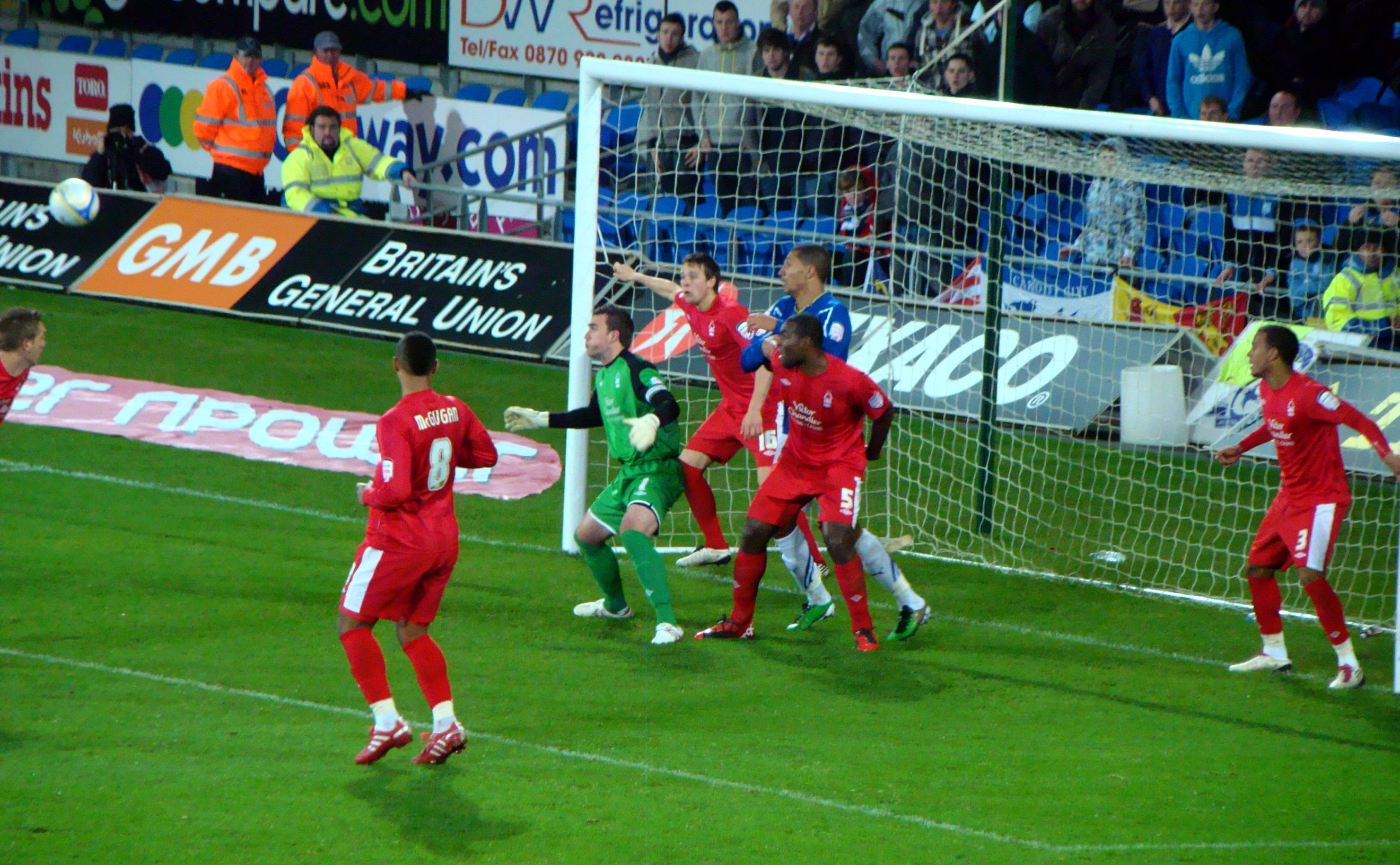
Lee Camp in the Nottingham Forest goal wearing green

On 20 October 2008 Camp joined Nottingham Forest on a three-month loan. He played a pivotal role in helping the club climb out of the bottom three and also saved two penalties; one against his former club Derby, and one against Bristol City. Both were in the final minutes of the games. He returned to QPR when Colin Calderwood was sacked and replaced by Billy Davies, his former manager at Derby County.

On 2 July 2009 it was announced on Forest's official website that a transfer had been agreed and, subject to a medical examination, Camp was to complete his signing by 4 July 2009. The fee was reported to be around £100,000 but with additional payments.

He made his first start as a permanent Forest player on 10 August 2009 in their league opener against Reading where they were unlucky to come away with only a 0–0 draw. Camp conceded only one goal in his first six games and kept a clean sheet for over 10.5 hours of football. He won the December Championship Player of the Month Award.

Camp was an ever-present in the Forest goal the following season, featuring in every match of the 2010–11 season and keeping a total of 12 clean sheets. When Club Captain Paul McKenna was injured, Camp stepped in as the Nottingham Forest Captain. Nottingham Forest manager Billy Davies spoke of his delight at having a goalkeeper with the class of Camp, saying "You talk about positives and negatives in players, but his performances have been first-class – simply outstanding." Camp kept a clean sheet in the first leg of the 2010–11 EFL Championship playoff semi-final against Swansea City where he was forced to make numerous saves. Camp finished second in the club's player of the season award to Luke Chambers.

In the summer 2011 transfer window, Forest rejected three bids from Swansea City – the highest of which was a £1.8 million bid – for the services of Camp.

Camp started the first game of season against Barnsley at the City Ground and kept his first clean sheet of the 2011–12 Championship season. Camp was able to keep his second clean sheet in the Reds' first league win of the season, against Doncaster Rovers. Camp's outstanding performance which saw him make critical saves against Watford, was key to seeing Forest pick up their second win and third clean sheet of the campaign. In what was a disappointing campaign for Forest, Camp started all 46 league matches, keeping 12 clean sheets.

Following months of unsuccessful contract negotiations and with Camp's contract set to expire, Alex McLeish confirmed that Camp was not part of his future plans, just weeks into his tenure as Reds manager, allowing Camp to move away from The City Ground. Camp was released from his contract on 23 January 2013.

=== Norwich City ===
Camp signed for Norwich City on 23 January 2013 following his release from Nottingham Forest and would wear the number 42 shirt. He made his second debut for Norwich on 17 March 2013 after goalkeeper Mark Bunn was sent off for handling a loose ball outside of the penalty box. Camp made his full Premier League debut the following week away at Wigan Athletic. Camp was again used as a substitute in a home game against Swansea City after Mark Bunn came off with a groin injury.

=== West Bromwich Albion ===
He signed for West Bromwich Albion on 1 September 2013, following Ben Foster's stress fracture in his right foot ruling him out for up to 12 weeks, Camp was signed as cover on a rolling monthly contract. After not making a senior appearance throughout September and October Camp joined Championship side AFC Bournemouth on 31 October 2013 for a month's loan until 27 November 2013. On 27 November 2013 his loan spell at Bournemouth was extended until 1 January 2014. He was released on his return to West Brom.

=== AFC Bournemouth ===
On 4 January 2014, after spending two months on loan at the club, Camp joined Bournemouth permanently on a two-and-a-half-year deal following his release from West Brom on 1 January 2014.

=== Rotherham United ===
On 1 September 2015, Camp was released by Bournemouth and signed for Rotherham United on a two-year deal. He quickly became a fans favourite and made crucial clean sheets against Birmingham City, Hull City and Bolton Wanderers. He made crucial saves against his old team Derby County as Rotherham came from 3–0 down to draw 3–3. He remained a regular until a knee injury sustained in November 2016 kept him out for the rest of his contract.

=== Cardiff City ===
Camp moved to Cardiff City in June 2017. On 31 January 2018, Camp made a deadline day switch to Sunderland, signing on loan for the remainder of the season. He never made an appearance for Cardiff.

=== Birmingham City ===
On 8 August 2018, Camp joined Championship side Birmingham City on a free transfer. Having been on the bench for the next league match, Camp replaced Connal Trueman for the visit to Reading in the EFL Cup first round, a 2–0 defeat. He kept his place for, and kept a clean sheet in, the goalless draw with Swansea City on 17 August.

Camp extended his contract to cover the last few matches of the COVID-19 pandemic-interrupted 2019–20 season and then left the club.

=== Coventry City ===
On 27 November 2020, Camp signed for Championship club Coventry City on a two-month contract as injury cover. He left when the deal expired without having been needed to play.

=== Swindon Town ===
Camp joined League One club Swindon Town on 12 March 2021 on a short-term contract. He played 11 matches in what remained of the season.

=== Clitheroe ===
Northern Premier League Division One West (eighth-tier) club Clitheroe signed Camp on a short-term basis in early February 2022 as cover for their injured first-choice goalkeeper.

=== Wrexham ===
On 24 March 2022, Camp signed for National League side Wrexham on a short-term contract.

== International career ==
Camp played for the England under-21s five times, including the first (professional) match at the new Wembley Stadium. He stated that this honour was the highlight of his footballing career up to that time. Camp conceded a goal 25 seconds after the game had started, making him the first man to concede a goal at the new stadium.

Having not earned a call-up to the full England team, Camp stated that he would be keen on playing for Northern Ireland, for whom he qualifies through his Newtownards-born grandfather. Northern Ireland boss Nigel Worthington asked the Irish Football Association to start the process to make Camp available for the national side and FIFA confirmed Camp's eligibility to play for Northern Ireland on 16 February 2011. He received his first call-up to the Northern Ireland squad on 14 March 2011, for the Euro 2012 qualifiers against Serbia and Slovenia, and made his Northern Ireland debut in the match against Serbia on 25 March 2011.

== Career statistics ==
Appearances and goals by club, season and competition
Club	Season	League			FA Cup		League Cup		Other		Total	
Club	Season	Division	Apps	Goals	Apps	Goals	Apps	Goals	Apps	Goals	Apps	Goals
Derby County	2002–03	First Division	1	0	0	0	0	0	0	0	1	0
Derby County	2004–05	Championship	45	0	3	0	1	0	2 (Note: Appearances in Championship play-offs)	0	51	0
Derby County	2005–06	Championship	40	0	1	0	0	0	—		41	0
Derby County	2006–07	Championship	3	0	0	0	1	0	—		4	0
Derby County	Total		89	0	4	0	2	0	2	0	97	0
Burton Albion (loan)	2002–03	Conference	5	0	0	0	—		0	0	5	0
Queens Park Rangers (loan)	2003–04	Second Division	12	0	—		—		—		12	0
Norwich City (loan)	2006–07	Championship	3	0	0	0	0	0	—		3	0
Queens Park Rangers (loan)	2006–07	Championship	11	0	0	0	0	0	—		11	0
Queens Park Rangers	2007–08	Championship	46	0	1	0	1	0	—		48	0
Queens Park Rangers	2008–09	Championship	4	0	0	0	1	0	—		5	0
Queens Park Rangers	Total		61	0	1	0	2	0	0	0	64	0
Nottingham Forest (loan)	2008–09	Championship	15	0	0	0	0	0	—		15	0
Nottingham Forest	2009–10	Championship	45	0	2	0	0	0	2	0	49	0
Nottingham Forest	2010–11	Championship	46	0	2	0	1	0	2	0	51	0
Nottingham Forest	2011–12	Championship	46	0	2	0	2	0	—		50	0
Nottingham Forest	2012–13	Championship	26	0	1	0	1	0	—		28	0
Nottingham Forest	Total		178	0	7	0	4	0	4	0	193	0
Norwich City	2012–13	Premier League	3	0	0	0	0	0	—		3	0
West Bromwich Albion	2013–14	Premier League	0	0	0	0	0	0	—		0	0
AFC Bournemouth	2013–14	Championship	33	0	1	0	0	0	—		34	0
AFC Bournemouth	2014–15	Championship	9	0	2	0	2	0	—		13	0
AFC Bournemouth	Total		42	0	3	0	2	0	0	0	47	0
Rotherham United	2015–16	Championship	41	0	1	0	0	0	—		42	0
Rotherham United	2016–17	Championship	18	0	0	0	0	0	—		18	0
Rotherham United	Total		59	0	1	0	0	0	—		60	0
Cardiff City	2017–18	Championship	0	0	0	0	0	0	—		0	0
Sunderland (loan)	2017–18	Championship	12	0	—		—		—		12	0
Birmingham City	2018–19	Championship	44	0	1	0	1	0	—		46	0
Birmingham City	2019–20	Championship	36	0	4	0	0	0	—		40	0
Birmingham City	Total		80	0	5	0	1	0	—		86	0
Coventry City	2020–21	Championship	0	0	0	0	0	0	—		0	0
Swindon Town	2020–21	League One	11	0	0	0	0	0	0	0	11	0
Clitheroe	2021–22	NPL Division One West	2	0	0	0	—		0	0	2	0
Wrexham	2021–22	National League	0	0	0	0	—		0	0	0	0
Career total			557	0	21	0	11	0	6	0	595	0

== Honours ==
Queens Park Rangers

- Football League Second Division second-place promotion: 2003–04

Derby County

- Football League Championship play-offs: 2007

Bournemouth

- Football League Championship: 2014–15

Individual

- PFA Team of the Year: 2009–10 Championship
- Nottingham Forest Player of the Season: 2009–10
- Rotherham United Player of the Year: 2015–16
