= 2004–05 Southampton F.C. season =

Southampton F.C.
2004–05 season
- Chairman: Rupert Lowe
- Manager: Paul Sturrock (until 23 August); Steve Wigley (from 23 August to 8 December); Harry Redknapp (from 8 December)
- Stadium: St Mary's Stadium
- Premier League: 20th (relegated)
- FA Cup: Sixth round
- League Cup: Fourth round
- Top goalscorer: League: Peter Crouch (12); All: Peter Crouch (16)
- Highest home attendance: 32,066 (vs. Manchester United, 15 May)
- Lowest home attendance: 27,343 (vs. Fulham, 5 January)
- Average home league attendance: 30,609
Home colours	Away colours

During the 2004–05 English football season, Southampton Football Club competed in the Premier League. It was the club's 27th consecutive season in the English top flight and their 120th year in existence, The team would be relegated at the end of the season after a 2–1 loss against Manchester United, they exited the FA Cup on the sixth round due to a 4–0 loss against Manchester United that was broadcast on the BBC, they were also eliminated from the Carling Cup in the fourth round, losing 5–2 against Watford. This season would also be Peter Crouch's only season with the club as he was transferred to Liverpool at the end of the season, while playing for the Saints he would earn his first England call-up.

== Season summary ==
Manager Paul Sturrock left Southampton by mutual consent in August, after only six months as manager; his resignation was attributed to a disappointing run of form and rumours of player unrest and boardroom dissatisfaction with his management. His replacement Steve Wigley failed to improve results and he was soon sacked with the club deep in relegation peril. Harry Redknapp came from arch-rivals Portsmouth in an attempt to save the Saints, but despite being able to attain safety and another season of Premiership football by winning on the last day of the season, Southampton lost 2–1 at home to Manchester United and were relegated from the Premiership in last place.

== Final league table ==
Pos	Team	Pld	W	D	L	GF	GA	GD	Pts	Qualification or relegation
16	Portsmouth	38	10	9	19	43	59	−16	39	
17	West Bromwich Albion	38	6	16	16	36	61	−25	34	
18	Crystal Palace (R)	38	7	12	19	41	62	−21	33	Relegation to the Football League Championship
19	Norwich City (R)	38	7	12	19	42	77	−35	33	Relegation to the Football League Championship
20	Southampton (R)	38	6	14	18	45	66	−21	32	Relegation to the Football League Championship

Rules for classification: 1) points; 2) goal difference; 3) number of goals scored.
(R) Relegated

== Kit ==
The season's kit was manufactured by the club's own brand, Saints. The kit was sponsored by English life insurance company Friends Provident.

== First-team squad ==
Squad at end of season

Note: Flags indicate national team as defined under FIFA eligibility rules; some limited exceptions apply. Players may hold more than one non-FIFA nationality.

No.	Pos.	Nation	Player
1	GK	FIN	Antti Niemi
2	DF	ENG	Jason Dodd
3	DF	ENG	Graeme Le Saux
4	DF	BEL	Jelle Van Damme
5	DF	NOR	Claus Lundekvam
6	DF	SWE	Andreas Jakobsson
7	FW	ENG	Kevin Phillips
8	MF	ENG	Matt Oakley
10	MF	SCO	Neil McCann
12	MF	SWE	Anders Svensson
13	GK	ENG	Paul Smith
14	FW	ENG	Peter Crouch
16	DF	ENG	Martin Cranie
18	MF	IRL	Rory Delap
19	DF	GIB	Danny Higginbotham
20	MF	ENG	David Prutton

No.	Pos.	Nation	Player
22	DF	ENG	Darren Kenton
23	DF	FRA	Olivier Bernard
24	FW	ENG	Dexter Blackstock
26	DF	ENG	Matthew Mills
27	FW	ENG	Leon Best
28	GK	NIR	Alan Blayney
29	MF	FRA	Fabrice Fernandes
30	MF	FRA	Léandre Griffit
31	MF	FRA	Yoann Folly
33	DF	SCO	Paul Telfer
34	FW	TTO	Kenwyne Jones
35	MF	SWE	Mikael Nilsson
36	FW	ENG	Brett Ormerod
37	FW	SEN	Henri Camara (on loan from Wolverhampton Wanderers)
38	MF	ENG	Jamie Redknapp
39	DF	ENG	Calum Davenport (on loan from Tottenham Hotspur)
40	MF	SCO	Nigel Quashie

=== Left club during season ===
Note: Flags indicate national team as defined under FIFA eligibility rules; some limited exceptions apply. Players may hold more than one non-FIFA nationality.

No.	Pos.	Nation	Player
9	FW	ENG	James Beattie (to Everton)
23	MF	WAL	Arron Davies (to Yeovil Town)

No.	Pos.	Nation	Player
37	GK	USA	Kasey Keller (on loan from Tottenham Hotspur)
—	DF	ENG	Mike Williamson (on loan to Wycombe Wanderers)

== Reserve squad ==
Note: Flags indicate national team as defined under FIFA eligibility rules; some limited exceptions apply. Players may hold more than one non-FIFA nationality.

No.	Pos.	Nation	Player
11	DF	SWE	Michael Svensson
15	DF	TUN	Alaeddine Yahia
17	FW	LAT	Marian Pahars

No.	Pos.	Nation	Player
21	MF	NOR	Jo Tessem
25	GK	ENG	Michael Poke
32	DF	NIR	Chris Baird

== Statistics ==
=== Appearances, goals and cards ===
(Starting appearances + substitute appearances)

No.	Pos.	Name	League		Domestic cups		Total		Discipline	
No.	Pos.	Name	Apps	Goals	Apps	Goals	Apps	Goals	Yellow card	Red card
1	GK	(Finland) Antti Niemi	28	0	4	0	32	0	0	0
2	DF	(England) Jason Dodd	4+1	0	0	0	4+1	0	0	0
3	DF	(England) Graeme Le Saux	24+1	1	1	0	24+1	1	3	0
4	DF	(Belgium) Jelle Van Damme	4+2	0	2+1	1	6+3	1	4	0
5	DF	(Norway) Claus Lundekvam	31+3	0	4+1	1	38+6	1	4	0
6	MF	(Sweden) Andreas Jakobsson	24+3	2	4+1	0	28+4	2	1	0
7	FW	(England) Kevin Phillips	21+9	10	5	3	26+9	13	3	0
8	MF	(England) Matt Oakley	6+1	1	3+1	1	9+2	2	0	0
9	FW	(England) James Beattie	11	3	0	0	11	3	0	0
10	MF	(Scotland) Neil McCann	5+6	0	3+2	1	8+8	1	3	0
11	DF	(Sweden) Michael Svensson	0	0	0	0	0	0	0	0
12	DF	(Sweden) Anders Svensson	21+9	3	3	0	24+9	3	0	0
13	GK	(England) Paul Smith	5+1	0	2	0	7+1	0	0	0
14	FW	(England) Peter Crouch	18+9	12	5	4	25+9	16	2	1
15	DF	(Tunisia) Alaeddine Yahia	0	0	0	0	0	0	0	0
16	DF	(England) Martin Cranie	3	0	0+2	0	3+2	0	0	0
17	FW	(Latvia) Marian Pahars	0	0	0	0	0	0	0	0
18	MF	(Republic of Ireland) Rory Delap	34+3	2	6	0	40+3	2	6	0
19	DF	(Gibraltar) Danny Higginbotham	20+1	1	4	0	24+1	1	0	0
20	MF	(England) David Prutton	19+4	1	5	1	24+4	2	9	1
21	FW	(Norway) Jo Tessem	0	0	0	0	0	0	0	0
22	DF	(England) Darren Kenton	3	0	3	1	6+2	1	3	0
23	DF	(France) Oliver Bernard	9	0	2	0	11	5	3	0
23	MF	(Wales) Arron Davies	0	0	0	0	0	0	0	0
24	FW	(England) Dexter Blackstock	8+1	1	0+2	4	8+3	5	1	0
25	MF	(England) Michael Poke	0	0	0	0	0	0	0	0
26	MF	(England) Matthew Mills	0	0	0	0	0	0	0	0
27	FW	(England) Leon Best	1+2	0	1+1	0	2+3	0	0	0
28	GK	(Northern Ireland) Alan Blayney	1	0	1	0	2	0	0	0
29	MF	(France) Fabrice Fernandes	14+2	0	1+1	0	15+3	0	0	0
30	MF	(France) Leandre Griffit	0+2	0	0+1	0	0+3	0	1	0
31	MF	(France) Yoann Folly	1+2	0	0+1	0	1+3	0	0	0
32	DF	(Northern Ireland) Chris Baird	0	0	0	0	0	0	0	0
33	MF	(Scotland) Paul Telfer	26+4	0	4+1	0	30+5	0	3	0
34	FW	(Trinidad and Tobago) Kenwyne Jones	1+1	0	0+1	0	2+1	0	8	0
35	DF	(Sweden) Mikael Nilsson	12+4	0	5	0	17+4	0	2	0
36	FW	(England) Brett Ormerod	5+4	0	2+1	1	7+5	1	1	0
37	FW	(Senegal) Henri Camara	10+3	4	1+1	2	11+4	6	0	0
37	GK	(United States) Kasey Keller	4	0	0	0	4	0	0	0
38	MF	(England) Jamie Redknapp	16	0	1	1	17	1	5	0
39	DF	(England) Calum Davenport	5+2	0	4	0	9+2	0	0	0
40	MF	(Scotland) Nigel Quashie	13	1	0	0	13	0	1	0

== Transfers ==
=== In ===
- (Belgium) Jelle Van Damme – (Netherlands) Ajax, £2,500,000, 9 June 2004
- (England) Peter Crouch – (England) Aston Villa, £2,000,000, 9 July 2004
- (Sweden) Andreas Jakobsson – (Denmark) Brøndby IF, £1,000,000, 31 August 2004
- (United States) Kasey Keller – (England) Tottenham Hotspur, 12 November 2004, month loan
- (England) Calum Davenport – (England) Tottenham Hotspur, 3 January 2005, five-month loan
- (England) Jamie Redknapp – (England) Tottenham Hotspur, 4 January 2005, free transfer
- (Scotland) Nigel Quashie – (England) Portsmouth, 17 January 2005, £2,100,000
- (France) Olivier Bernard – (England) Newcastle United, undisclosed (believed to be £400,000), 31 January 2005
- (Senegal) Henri Camara – (England) Wolverhampton Wanderers, 31 January 2005, four-month loan
- (Tunisia) Alaeddine Yahia – (France) Guingamp, £350,000
- (Sweden) Mikael Nilsson – (Sweden) Halmstad, £400,000

=== Out ===
- (Ecuador) Agustín Delgado – released (later joined (Ecuador) Aucas), 17 June 2004
- (England) Mike Williamson – (England) Wycombe Wanderers, season loan, 4 July 2004
- (England) Fitz Hall – (England) Crystal Palace, £1,500,000, 12 August 2004
- (Scotland) Stephen Crainey – (England) Leeds United, £200,000, 26 August 2004
- (England) Martin Cranie – (England) Bournemouth, loan, 29 October 2004
- (Wales) Arron Davies – (England) Yeovil Town, undisclosed, 16 December 2004
- (Trinidad and Tobago) Kenwyne Jones – (England) Sheffield Wednesday, loan, 17 December 2004
- (England) James Beattie – (England) Everton, 4 January 2005, £6,000,000
- (France) Yoann Folly – (England) Nottingham Forest, month loan, 7 January 2005
- (Northern Ireland) Alan Blayney – (England) Rushden & Diamonds, loan, 1 February 2005
- (Northern Ireland) Alan Blayney – (England) Brighton & Hove Albion, loan, 24 March 2005
- (England) Jason Dodd – (England) Plymouth Argyle, month loan, 24 March 2005
- (England) Dexter Blackstock – (England) Plymouth Argyle, loan
- (England) Leon Best – (England) Queens Park Rangers, loan
- (Scotland) Stuart Anderson – (England) Blackpool

== Matches ==
=== Results per matchday ===
Matchday	1	2	3	4	5	6	7	8	9	10	11	12	13	14	15	16	17	18	19	20	21	22	23	24	25	26	27	28	29	30	31	32	33	34	35	36	37	38
Ground	A	H	H	A	A	H	A	H	A	H	A	H	H	A	H	A	H	A	H	A	A	H	A	H	A	H	A	H	H	A	H	A	H	A	A	H	A	H
Result	L	W	L	L	D	L	L	D	L	D	D	D	W	L	D	L	D	L	D	L	L	D	L	W	L	D	D	D	W	W	L	L	L	D	L	W	D	L
Position	19	10	14	15	15	17	17	18	19	18	18	18	17	17	18	18	19	19	19	19	19	19	19	18	18	19	18	18	18	17	17	17	18	17	20	17	18	20

A = Away; H = Home; W = Win; D = Draw; L = Loss

=== Premier League ===
14 August 2004 1	Aston Villa	2–0	Southampton	Birmingham, West Midlands
15:00	Vassell 12'; Cole 34'	Report		Stadium: Villa Park; Attendance: 36,690; Referee: Uriah Rennie

21 August 2004 2	Southampton	3–2	Blackburn Rovers	Southampton, Hampshire
	Phillips 32'; A. Svensson 74'; Beattie 90' (pen.)	Report	Ferguson 50'; Dickov 68'	Stadium: St Mary's Stadium; Attendance: 27,492; Referee: Andy D'Urso

25 August 2004 3	Southampton	1–2	Bolton Wanderers	Southampton, Hampshire
	Crouch 85'	Report	Pedersen 7'; Okocha 27' (pen.)	Stadium: St Mary's Stadium; Attendance: 30,713; Referee: Steve Dunn

28 August 2004 4	Chelsea	2–1	Southampton	Fulham, London
	Beattie 34' (o.g.); Lampard 41' (pen.)	Report	Beattie 1'	Stadium: Stamford Bridge; Attendance: 40,864; Referee: Steve Bennett

13 September 2004 5	Charlton Athletic	0–0	Southampton	Greenwich, London
		Report		Stadium: The Valley; Attendance: 24,263; Referee: Neale Barry

19 September 2004 6	Southampton	1–2	Newcastle United	Southampton, Hampshire
	A. Svensson 53'	Report	Prutton 45' (o.g.); Carr 57'	Stadium: St Mary's Stadium; Attendance: 30,709; Referee: Chris Foy

25 September 2004 7	Fulham	1–0	Southampton	Fulham, London
	Radzinski 24'	Report		Stadium: Craven Cottage; Attendance: 19,237; Referee: Graham Poll

2 October 2004 8	Southampton	0–0	Manchester City	Southampton, Hampshire
12:45		report		Stadium: St Mary's Stadium; Attendance: 28,605; Referee: Uriah Rennie

16 October 2004 9	Everton	1–0	Southampton	Liverpool, Merseyside
	Osman 88'	Report		Stadium: Goodison Park; Attendance: 35,256; Referee: Barry Knight

24 October 2004 10	Southampton	0–0	Birmingham City	Southampton, Hampshire
14:00 BST (UTC+01)		Report		Stadium: St Mary's Stadium; Attendance: 27,568; Referee: Mike Dean

30 October 2004 11	Arsenal	2–2	Southampton	Islington, London
	Henry 67' van Persie 90'	Report	Delap 80', 85'	Stadium: Highbury; Attendance: 38,141; Referee: Matt Messias

6 November 2004 12	Southampton	2–2	West Bromwich Albion	Southampton, Hampshire
	A. Svensson 28'; Robinson 87' (o.g.)	Report	Earnshaw 29', 37'	Stadium: St Mary's Stadium; Attendance: 31,057; Referee: Steve Bennett

13 November 2004 13	Southampton	2–1	Portsmouth	Southampton, Hampshire
	Blackstock 18'; Phillips 71'	Report	Jakobsson 12' (o.g.)	Stadium: St Mary's Stadium; Attendance: 30,921; Referee: Graham Poll

20 November 2004 14	Norwich City	2–1	Southampton	Norwich, Norfolk
15:00 GMT	Francis 28', 52'	Report	Beattie 24'	Stadium: Carrow Road; Attendance: 23,706; Referee: Mike Riley

27 November 2004 15	Southampton	2–2	Crystal Palace	Southampton, Hampshire
	Phillips 50'; Jakobsson 76'	Report	Johnson 48'; Jakobsson 54' (o.g.)	Stadium: St. Mary's Stadium; Attendance: 31,833; Referee: Peter Walton

4 December 2004 16	Manchester United	3–0	Southampton	Trafford, Greater Manchester
	Scholes 53'; Rooney 58'; Ronaldo 87'	Report		Stadium: Old Trafford; Attendance: 67,921; Referee: Barry Knight

11 December 2004 17	Southampton	2–2	Middlesbrough	Southampton, Hampshire
	Phillips 45'; Crouch 64'	Report	Higgonbotham 89' (o.g.); Downing 90'	Stadium: St. Mary's Stadium; Attendance: 29,018; Referee: Neale Barry

18 December 2004 18	Tottenham Hotspur	5–1	Southampton	Haringey, London
	Defoe 8', 27', 61'; Kanouté 44'; Keane 88'	Report	Crouch 47'	Stadium: White Hart Lane; Attendance: 36,054; Referee: Phil Dowd

26 December 2004 19	Southampton	0–0	Charlton Athletic	Southampton, Hampshire
		Report		Stadium: St. Mary's Stadium; Referee: Steve Dunn

28 December 2004 20	Liverpool	1–0	Southampton	Liverpool, Merseyside
	Sinama Pongolle 44'	Report		Stadium: Anfield; Attendance: 42,382; Referee: Mark Halsey

1 January 2005 21	Manchester City	2–1	Southampton	Manchester, Greater Manchester
15:00	Bosvelt 19'; S. Wright-Phillips 40'	report	Phillips 90' (pen.)	Stadium: City of Manchester Stadium; Attendance: 42,895; Referee: Chris Foy

5 January 2005 22	Southampton	3–3	Fulham	Southampton, Hampshire
	Phillips 21', 29'; Rosenior 71' (o.g.)	Report	Diop 20'; Malbranque 43'; Radzinski 50'	Stadium: St. Mary's Stadium; Attendance: 27,343; Referee: Graham Poll

15 January 2005 23	Newcastle United	2–1	Southampton	Newcastle upon Tyne
	Shearer 9' (pen.); Bramble 38'	Report	Crouch 42'	Stadium: St James' Park; Attendance: 51,266; Referee: Uriah Rennie

22 January 2005 24	Southampton	2–0	Liverpool	Southampton, Hampshire
	Prutton 5'; Crouch 22'	Report		Stadium: St. Mary's Stadium; Attendance: 32,017; Referee: Alan Wiley

2 February 2005 25	Birmingham City	2–1	Southampton	Birmingham, West Midlands
19:45 GMT (UTC)	Pandiani 12'; Blake 41' (pen.)	Report	Camara 52'	Stadium: St Andrew's; Attendance: 28,797; Referee: Peter Walton

6 February 2005 26	Southampton	2–2	Everton	Southampton, Hampshire
	Crouch 36'; Camara 55'	Report	Beattie 4'; Bent 90'	Stadium: St. Mary's Stadium; Attendance: 31,509; Referee: Andy D'Urso

22 February 2005 27	West Bromwich Albion	0–0	Southampton	West Bromwich, West Midlands
		Report		Stadium: The Hawthorns; Attendance: 25,865; Referee: Mike Riley

26 February 2005 28	Southampton	1–1	Arsenal	Southampton, Hampshire
	Prutton (yellow card) 35' (yellow-red card) 45'; Crouch 67'	Report	Ljungberg 45' van Persie (yellow card) (yellow-red card) 52'	Stadium: St Mary's Stadium; Attendance: 31,815; Referee: Alan Wiley

5 March 2005 29	Southampton	1–0	Tottenham Hotspur	Southampton, Hampshire
	Quashie 51'	Report		Stadium: St Mary's Stadium; Attendance: 31,903; Referee: Peter Walton

20 March 2005 30	Middlesbrough	1–3	Southampton	Southampton, Hampshire
	Hasselbaink 41'	Report	Jakobsson 14'; Crouch 60', 67'	Stadium: St Mary's Stadium; Attendance: 30,082; Referee: Uriah Rennie

2 April 2005 31	Southampton	1–3	Chelsea	Southampton, Hampshire
	Phillips 69'	Report	Lampard 22'; Guðjohnsen 39', 83'	Stadium: St Mary's Stadium; Attendance: 31,949; Referee: Mark Halsey

9 April 2005 32	Blackburn Rovers	3–0	Southampton	Blackburn, Lancashire
	Pederson 11'; Jakobson (o.g.) 48'; Reid 55'	Report		Stadium: Ewood Parm; Attendance: 20,726; Referee: Neale Barry

16 April 2005 33	Southampton	2–3	Aston Villa	Southampton, Hampshire
	Phillips 4'; Crouch 13'	Report	Cole 55'; Solano 70'; Davis 72'	Stadium: St Mary's Stadium; Attendance: 31,926; Referee: Andy D'Urso

19 April 2005 34	Bolton Wanderers	1–1	Southampton	Horwich, Greater Manchester
	Giannakopoulos 25'	Report	Phillips 69'	Stadium: Reebok Stadium; Attendance: 25,125; Referee: Mark Calttenburg

24 April 2005 34	Portsmouth	4–1	Southampton	Portsmouth, Hampshire
	Yakubu 4' (pen.) de Zeeuw 17'; LuaLua 22', 27'	Report	Camara 20'	Stadium: Fratton Park; Attendance: 20,210; Referee: Steve Dunn

30 April 2005 36	Southampton	4–3	Norwich City	Southampton, Hampshire
15:00 BST	Oakley 7'; Crouch 20'; Le Saux 39'; Camara 88'	Report	Bentley 3'; Higginbotham 31' (o.g.); McKenzie 45'	Stadium: St Mary's Stadium; Attendance: 31,944; Referee: Graham Poll

7 May 2005 37	Crystal Palace	2–2	Southampton	Croydon, London
BST	Hall 34'; Ventola 72'; Sorondo (red card)	Report	Crouch 37' (pen.) (red card); Higginbotham 90'	Stadium: Selhurst Park; Attendance: 26,066; Referee: Howard Webb

15 May 2005 38	Southampton	1–2	Manchester United	Southampton, Hampshire
BST	O'Shea 10' (o.g.)	Report	Fletcher 19' van Nistelrooy 63'	Stadium: St Mary's Stadium; Attendance: 32,066; Referee: Steve Bennett

=== FA Cup ===
5 January 2005 3	Northampton Town	1–3	Southampton	Northampton
15:00	Williamson 30'	Report	Phillips 29'; Crouch 41'; Redknapp 53'	Stadium: Sixfields Stadium; Attendance: 7,183; Referee: Michael Jones

29 January 2005 4	Southampton	2–1	Portsmouth	Southampton, Hampshire
	Oakley 54'; Crouch 90' (pen.)	2–1	Yakubu 57' (pen.); Kamara (red card) 72'	Stadium: St Mary's Stadium; Attendance: 29,453; Referee: Steve Bennett

19 February 2005 5	Southampton	2–2	Brentford	Southampton, Hampshire
	Camara 4', 36'	Report	Rankin 40'; Sodje 58'	Stadium: St Mary's Stadium; Attendance: 24,741; Referee: Graham Poll

1 March 2005 5 (replay)	Brentford	1–3	Southampton	Hounslow, London
	Hutchinson 4'	Report	Crouch 11', 90'; Phillips 67'	Stadium: Griffin Park; Attendance: 11,720; Referee: Barry Knight

12 March 2005 6	Southampton	0–4	Manchester United	Southampton, Hampshire
17:15		Report	Keane 2'; Ronaldo 45'; Scholes 48', 87'	Stadium: St Mary's Stadium; Attendance: 30,971; Referee: Howard Webb

=== League Cup ===
22 September 2004 2	Northampton Town	0–3	Southampton	Northampton, Northamptonshire
		Report	Phillips 32'; Prutton 35'; McCann 65'	Stadium: Sixfields Stadium; Attendance: 6,343; Referee: Howard Webb

27 October 2004 3	Southampton	3–2	Colchester United	Southampton, Hampshire
	Blackstock 50', 54', 80'	Report	Danns 7'; Halford 64'	Stadium: St Mary's Stadium; Attendance: 20,588; Referee: M Jones

9 November 2004 4	Watford	5–2	Southampton	Watford, Hertfordshire
	Dyer 39'; Chambers 52', 62'; Helguson 66'; Bouazza 84'	Report	Blackstock 84'; Ormerod 88'	Stadium: Vicarage Road; Attendance: 13,008; Referee: Barry Knight
