= James Reid (footballer, born 1990) =

English footballer

Personal information
- Full name: James Alexander Reid
- Date of birth: 28 February 1990 (age 36)
- Place of birth: Nottingham, England
- Position: Midfielder

Youth career
- Nottingham Forest

Senior career*
Years	Team	Apps	(Gls)
2008–2010	Nottingham Forest	1	(0)
2009	→ Rushden & Diamonds (loan)	11	(2)
2010	Lincoln City	0	(0)
2010–2011	Hinckley United	38	(13)
2011–2012	AFC Telford United	5	(0)
2011–2012	→ Ilkeston (loan)	9	(4)
2012–2015	Ilkeston	128	(27)
2015–2016	Nuneaton Town	25	(3)
2016–2017	Gainsborough Trinity	27	(5)
2017–2020	Basford United		
2020–2022	Ilkeston Town		

International career^{‡}
- England U17
2008	England U18	1	(0)
2009	England U19	1	(0)
- * Club domestic league appearances and goals as of 09:07, 16 March 2018 (UTC) ‡ National team caps and goals as of 03:36, 22 July 2009 (UTC)

James Reid (born 28 February 1990) is an English footballer who plays primarily as a left-winger.

== Career ==
=== Nottingham Forest ===
Born in Nottingham, Nottinghamshire, Reid made his debut for Nottingham Forest after coming on as a 90th-minute substitute in the 1–0 victory over Barnsley in the Championship on 29 November 2008.

=== Rushden & Diamonds ===
He joined Rushden & Diamonds on an initial six-month loan on 7 July 2009.

=== Lincoln City ===
On 11 March 2010, Reid agreed non-contract terms for Football League Two side Lincoln City.

=== Non-league ===
Having not played a game for Lincoln, Reid signed for Hinckley United in August 2010.

On 7 June 2011, Reid signed for AFC Telford United.

In November 2011 he joined Ilkeston on loan

On 31 January 2012 he cancelled his contract with Telford by mutual consent and joined his Ilkeston on a permanent deal until the end of season.

On 17 May 2016 it was announced that Reid had turned down the offer of full-time football with Nuneaton Town to join Gainsborough Trinity.

On 17 March 2017, Basford United announced on their official Facebook page that they had signed Reid from Gainsborough.

On 22 May 2020, it was announced that Reid would return to Ilkeston Town, having turned down an opportunity to extend his contract at Basford.

== Career statistics ==
Appearances and goals by club, season and competition
Club	Season	League			FA Cup		Other		Total	
Club	Season	Division	Apps	Goals	Apps	Goals	Apps	Goals	Apps	Goals
Nottingham Forest	2008–09	Championship	1	0	0	0	0	0	1	0
Nottingham Forest	2009–10	Championship	0	0	0	0	0	0	0	0
Nottingham Forest	Total		1	0	0	0	0	0	1	0
Rushden & Diamonds (loan)	2009–10	Conference Premier	11	2	1	0	2 (Note: Appearance(s) in Northamptonshire Senior Cup)	1	14	3
Lincoln City	2009–10	League Two	0	0	0	0	0	0	0	0
Hinckley United	2010–11	Conference North	38	13	0	0	1 (Note: Appearance(s) in FA Trophy)	1	39	14
AFC Telford United	2011–12	Conference Premier	5	0	1	0	0	0	6	0
Ilkeston	2011–12 (Note: Part of this season was spent on loan from AFC Telford United)	Northern Premier League Division One South	19	6	—		4 (Note: Two appearances in FA Trophy; two appearances in Northern Premier League Division One South play-offs)	0	23	6
Ilkeston	2012–13	Northern Premier League Premier Division	31	6	5	0	7 (Note: Two appearances one goal in FA Trophy; one appearance in Northern Premier League Challenge Cup; four appearances four goals in Derbyshire Senior Cup)	5	43	11
Ilkeston	2013–14	Northern Premier League Premier Division	44	9	1	0	5 (Note: One appearance in FA Trophy; four appearances one goal in Derbyshire Senior Cup)	1	50	10
Ilkeston	2014–15	Northern Premier League Premier Division	43	10	1	0	8 (Note: One appearance in FA Trophy; four appearances one goal in Northern Premier League Challenge Cup; one appearance in Derbyshire Senior Cup; two appearances in Northern Premier League Premier Division play-offs)	1	52	11
Ilkeston	Total		137	31	7	0	24	7	168	38
Nuneaton Town	2015–16	National League North	25	3	2	0	3 (Note: One appearance in FA Trophy; two appearances one goal in Birmingham Senior Cup)	1	30	4
Gainsborough Trinity	2016–17	National League North	27	5	0	0	0	0	27	5
Career total			244	54	11	0	30	10	285	64
