= Dexter Blackstock =

English-Antiguan footballer (born 1986)

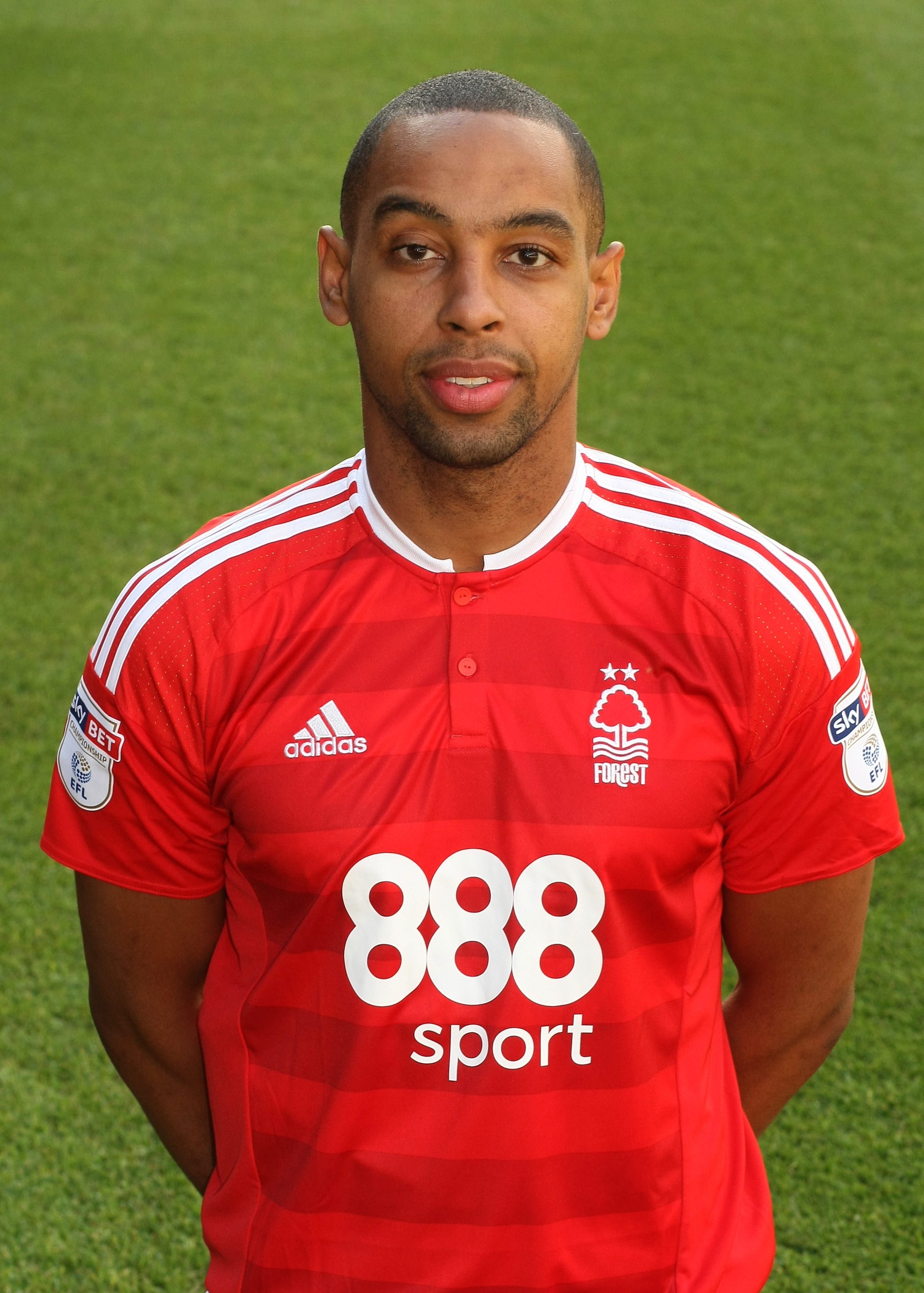
- Blackstock in 2016

Personal information
- Full name: Dexter Anthony Titus Blackstock
- Date of birth: 20 May 1986 (age 40)
- Place of birth: Oxford, England
- Height: 6 ft 1 in (1.85 m)
- Position: Striker

Youth career
- 2002–2003: Oxford United

Senior career*
Years	Team	Apps	(Gls)
2003–2006	Southampton	28	(4)
2005	→ Plymouth Argyle (loan)	14	(4)
2005	→ Derby County (loan)	9	(3)
2006–2009	Queens Park Rangers	109	(30)
2009	→ Nottingham Forest (loan)	6	(2)
2009–2016	Nottingham Forest	164	(40)
2013	→ Leeds United (loan)	4	(1)
2016–2017	Rotherham United	16	(1)
Total		350	(86)

International career
2004	England U18	1	(0)
2004–2005	England U19	4	(0)
2007–2008	England U21	2	(0)
2012–2016	Antigua and Barbuda	6	(2)
- * Club domestic league appearances and goals

Dexter Anthony Titus Blackstock (born 20 May 1986) is a former professional footballer who played as a striker. He played most notably for Queens Park Rangers and Nottingham Forest.

Having represented England at youth international level, Blackstock went on to play for the Antigua and Barbuda national team; he qualified through his grandfather, who was born in Antigua. He also could have played for Jamaica through his father's side.

== Playing career ==
=== Southampton ===
Born in Oxford, Oxfordshire, he came through the Oxford United youth system and was then signed by Southampton, who had to pay United compensation of £275,000 as a result. Due to an injury crisis he was brought into the Southampton first team, where he scored a hat-trick against Colchester United in the League Cup in 2004. He then scored in the local derby against Portsmouth in Southampton's 2–1 win, thus establishing himself in the squad.

He was sent out on loan twice; to Plymouth Argyle in February 2005 for twelve weeks, scoring 4 goals in 14 appearances, and to Derby County in October 2005, scoring 3 goals in 9 appearances. He was recalled from Derby on 22 December 2005 after the appointment of George Burley as Southampton manager.

On 18 February 2006 he played in goal for the final ten minutes of the FA Cup fifth round tie against Newcastle United. An injury to Bartosz Białkowski and with Southampton having used all three substitutes, meant that Blackstock had to take over.

Although Blackstock had featured regularly under Burley, Southampton's purchase of Bradley Wright-Phillips meant that Blackstock had more competition for a role in Southampton's first team. As a result, Blackstock moved to Queens Park Rangers on 10 August 2006 for a fee believed to be around £500,000.

=== Queens Park Rangers ===
Gary Waddock paid a £500,000 transfer fee for Blackstock's service. Blackstock was given the number 32 shirt for the 2006–07 season, he was first choice striker throughout the season and played with a number of different partners, including Kevin Gallen, Paul Furlong and Marc Nygaard. Player Ray Jones was Blackstock's most regular partner as they combined their abilities in pace and power.

As the season progressed so did Blackstock, and it was in the final stages of the season that his performances started to blossom. Throughout the campaign his work effort was fantastic, but he had displayed a worrying sign of missing one-on-one's in the early stages of his QPR career. These worries soon disappeared and a fantastic goal against Preston North End was the highlight of the season. Receiving a ball from Marc Nygaard in a left back position, Blackstock chested the ball down and volleyed it with his left foot into the top corner from 30 yards.

Blackstock ended the campaign as club top scorer on 14 goals, one short of his personal target of 15. He came second in the player of the season awards, and his goal against Preston won goal of the season.

After scoring just six in 2007–08, Blackstock returned to form in 2008–09, and by the end of January had scored 12 goals in all competitions.

=== Nottingham Forest ===
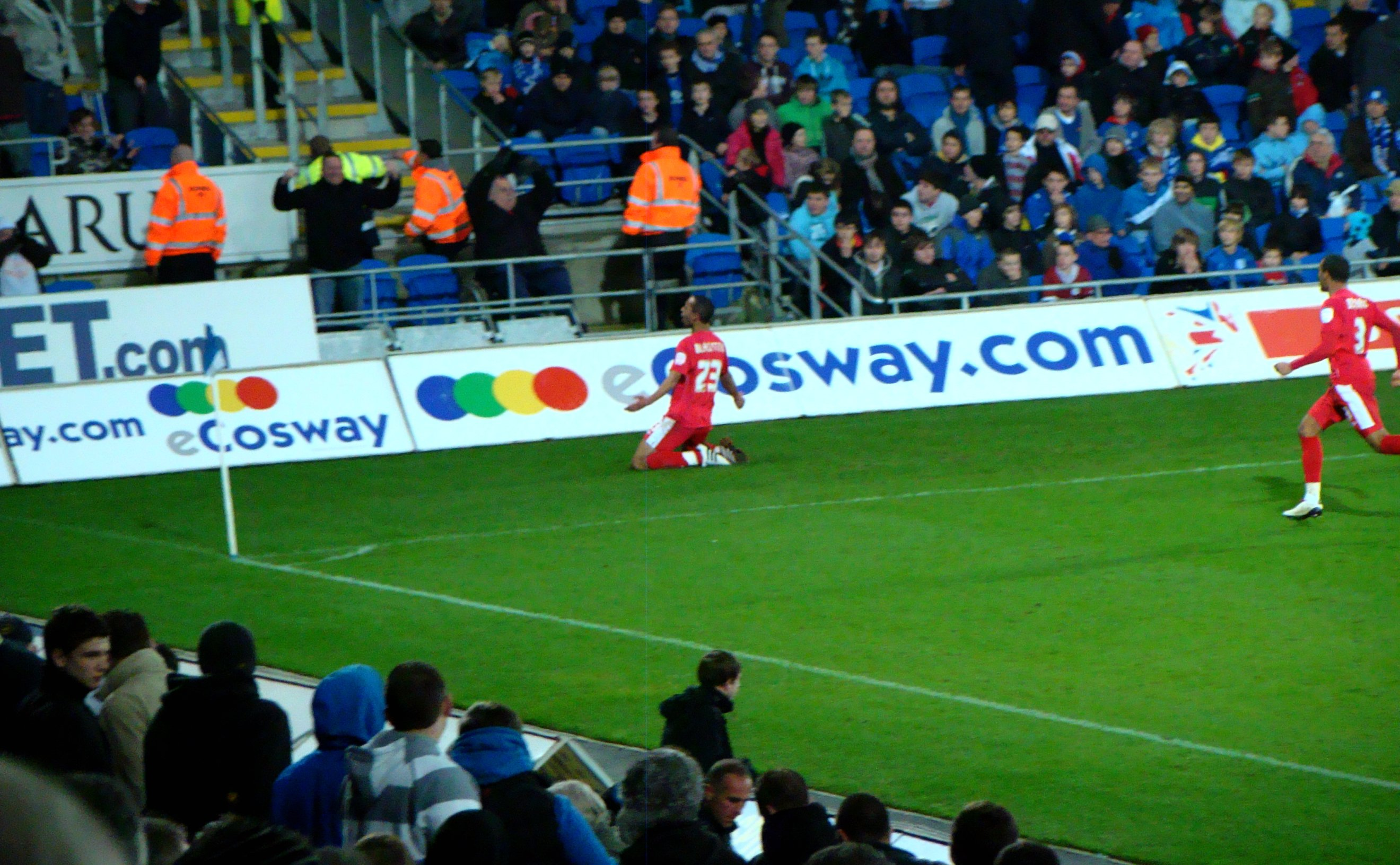
Blackstock celebrates after scoring a goal for Nottingham Forest against Cardiff City

On 26 March 2009 it was announced that Blackstock had signed for Nottingham Forest on loan until the end of the season, with an undisclosed fee agreed should Forest avoid relegation. Blackstock subsequently made his debut for Forest against Barnsley on 4 April 2009 at Oakwell, scoring his first goal, the winner, for the club against Bristol City in a dramatic 3–2 win at the City Ground on 11 April 2009.

On 22 July 2009, Blackstock signed a 4-year contract with Nottingham Forest for a seven figure fee. He scored his first goal of the season when he notched in a first round Football League Cup win over Bradford City on 12 August 2009. He scored his first goal of the 2010–11 season in a 1–1 draw against newly promoted side Leeds United.

On 20 November 2010 Blackstock suffered serious knee ligament damage after scoring the second goal in Forest's 2–0 win at Cardiff City and was subsequently sidelined for 12 months. He made his comeback in a friendly against York City on 14 November 2011 and scored along with Paul Anderson, another long term injured player.

In August 2011, there was reported interest from Blackpool in Blackstock.

He scored both goals, his first ones back after being injured, in a 2–1 win against Birmingham City on 25 February 2012. Blackstock signed a new four-and-a-half-year contract with Forest on 24 January 2013.

==== Leeds United loan ====
On 24 October 2013, Blackstock signed for Leeds United on a three-month loan until 25 January 2014. He was handed the number 9 shirt and made his Leeds debut as a second-half substitute against Huddersfield Town on 26 October, scoring with his first touch for a debut goal.

Blackstock's loan at Leeds was cut short when he returned to Nottingham on 10 December 2013 due to a knee injury.

==== Return from loan ====
Blackstock missed the remainder of the 2013–14 season and the beginning of the 2014–15 season with the knee injury. He made his first return to action since suffering the injury on 2 September 2014, playing 45 minutes in a game for Forest's under-21 side. Blackstock eventually made his return to competitive action as a substitute in the 74th minute of a League Cup tie against Spurs on 24 September 2014.

On 1 September 2016, Forest and Blackstock mutually agreed to terminate his contract at the club.

=== Rotherham United ===
Following his release from Forest, Blackstock signed a 3-year deal with Rotherham United on 5 September 2016. Blackstock scored his first goal for the club in a 3–1 loss against Norwich City on 15 October 2016.

On 12 July 2017 he agreed to leave Rotherham United by mutual consent.

== International career ==
On 16 August 2007, Blackstock was called up to Stuart Pearce's first England under-21 squad as full-time manager. In the match against Montenegro on 7 September, he came on as a substitute on 90 minutes and headed the ball down for Andrew Surman to score the final goal in a 3–0 victory.

Blackstock made his senior international appearance for Antigua and Barbuda in a 4–0 friendly defeat to Trinidad & Tobago on 29 February 2012. He scored his first goal on 12 October 2012 in a 2014 World Cup qualifier against United States.

=== International goals ===
Scores and results list Antigua and Barbuda's goal tally first.

#	Date	Venue	Opponent	Score	Result	Competition
1.	12 October 2012	Sir Vivian Richards Stadium, North Sound	United States	1–1	1–2	2014 World Cup qualification
2.	5 June 2016	Juan Ramón Loubriel Stadium, Bayamón	Puerto Rico	1–1	1–2	2017 Caribbean Cup qualification

== Outside interests ==
In 2009, Blackstock opened a football school for children aged from six to fourteen.

Blackstock owns a property portfolio consisting of 50 properties. In 2016, tenants in a buy to let home owned by Blackstock spoke out to the media about the dangerous condition the home was in, despite complaining several times to Blackstock and Student Living, the property management company he had hired. Student Living claimed that working with Blackstock had been 'a nightmare'. In October 2019, Blackstock admitted 12 licensing offences and was fined £24,000 after inspectors found a number of his properties in disrepair. The following month, the property manager was fined £7,500.

In February 2021, Blackstock was ordered to pay back £8,000 in housing benefits that he was paid by tenants for two unlicenced properties.

Blackstock has business interests in the pharmaceutical industry. He is the CEO of MediConnect and is a shareholder in online pharmacy UK Meds.

== Career statistics ==
As of 7 May 2017

Appearances and goals by club, season and competition
Club	Season	League			FA Cup		League Cup		Other		Total	
Club	Season	Division	Apps	Goals	Apps	Goals	Apps	Goals	Apps	Goals	Apps	Goals
Southampton	2004–05	Premier League	9	1	0	0	2	4	—		11	5
Southampton	2005–06	Championship	19	3	3	0	2	1	—		24	4
Southampton	Total		28	4	3	0	4	5	—		35	9
Plymouth Argyle (loan)	2004–05	Championship	14	4	0	0	0	0	—		14	4
Derby County (loan)	2005–06	Championship	9	3	0	0	0	0	—		9	3
Queens Park Rangers	2006–07	Championship	39	13	2	1	1	0	—		42	14
Queens Park Rangers	2007–08	Championship	35	6	1	0	0	0	—		36	6
Queens Park Rangers	2008–09	Championship	35	11	1	0	2	1	—		38	12
Queens Park Rangers	Total		109	30	4	1	3	1	—		116	32
Nottingham Forest (loan)	2008–09	Championship	6	2	0	0	0	0	—		6	2
Nottingham Forest	2009–10	Championship	39	12	1	0	3	1	2 (Note: Appearances in Football League play-offs)	0	45	13
Nottingham Forest	2010–11	Championship	17	5	0	0	1	0	0	0	18	5
Nottingham Forest	2011–12	Championship	22	8	2	0	0	0	—		24	8
Nottingham Forest	2012–13	Championship	37	6	1	0	1	1	—		39	7
Nottingham Forest	2013–14	Championship	1	0	0	0	2	0	—		3	0
Nottingham Forest	2014–15	Championship	19	5	0	0	1	0	—		20	5
Nottingham Forest	2015–16	Championship	29	4	2	0	1	0	—		32	4
Nottingham Forest	Total		170	42	6	0	9	2	2	0	187	44
Leeds United (loan)	2013–14	Championship	4	1	0	0	0	0	—		4	1
Rotherham United	2016–17	Championship	16	1	1	0	0	0	—		17	1
Career total			350	88	14	1	16	8	2	0	382	95
