= 2015 CONCACAF Gold Cup disciplinary record =

In the 2015 CONCACAF Gold Cup, the main disciplinary action taken against players comes in the form of red and yellow cards.

Any player picking up a red card is expelled from the pitch and automatically banned for his country's next match, whether via a straight red or second yellow. After a straight red card, FIFA will conduct a hearing and may extend this ban beyond one match. If the ban extends beyond the end of the finals (i.e. if a player is sent off in the match in which his team was eliminated), it must be served in the team's next competitive international match(es). In most cases, that will be the first matches of 2018 FIFA World Cup qualifying.

== Disciplinary statistics ==
- Total number of yellow cards: 45
- Average yellow cards per match: 3.75
- Total number of red cards: 2
- Average red cards per match: 0.17
- First yellow card: Jean Alexandre (Haiti against Panama)
- First red card: Luis Henríquez (Panama against Honduras)
- Fastest yellow card from kick off: 9 minutes (Jean Alexandre; Haiti against Panama and Joel Campbell; Costa Rica against El Salvador)
- Fastest yellow card after coming on as substitute: 3 minutes (Andre Boucaud; Trinidad and Tobago against Guatemala)
- Latest yellow card in a match without extra time: 90+2 minutes (David Guzmán; Costa Rica against El Salvador)
- Fastest dismissal from kick off: 76 minutes (José Manuel Contreras; Guatemala against Mexico)
- Fastest dismissal of a substitute:
- Latest dismissal in a match without extra time: 90 minutes (Luis Henríquez; Panama against Honduras)
- Least time difference between two yellow cards given to the same player: 3 minutes (José Manuel Contreras; Guatemala against Mexico)
- Most yellow cards (team): 6 (Panama and Guatemala)
- Most red cards (team): 6' (Panama and Guatemala)
- Fewest yellow cards (team): 1 (Jamaica and the United States)
- Most yellow cards (player): 1 (16 players tied)
- Most red cards (player): 1 (Luis Henríquez and José Manuel Contreras)
- Most yellow cards (match): 6 (4 games tied)
- Most red cards (match): 1 (Honduras against Panama and Guatemala against Mexico)
- Fewest yellow cards (match): 0 (Mexico against Cuba)
- Most cards in one match: 6 yellow cards; 1 red card (Honduras against Panama and Guatemala against Mexico)

== Detailed statistics ==
=== By match ===
Day	Match	Round	Referee	Total cards	Yellow	Second yellow	Straight red
Day 1	Panama vs Haiti	Group A	(Costa Rica) Henry Bejarano	4	4	0	0
Day 1	United States vs Honduras	Group A	(Mexico) César Ramos	2	2	0	0
Day 2	Costa Rica vs Jamaica	Group B	(Mexico) Fernando Guerrero	2	2	0	0
Day 2	El Salvador vs Canada	Group B	(Honduras) Oscar Moncada	3	3	0	0
Day 3	Trinidad and Tobago vs Guatemala	Group C	(Panama) John Pitti	6	6	0	0
Day 3	Mexico vs Cuba	Group C	(Costa Rica) Walter Quesada	0	0	0	0
Day 4	Honduras vs Panama	Group A	(El Salvador) Marlon Mejia	7	6	1	0
Day 4	(United States) USA vs Haiti	Group A	(Costa Rica) Ricardo Montero	3	3	0	0
Day 5	Jamaica vs Canada	Group B	(Cuba) Yadel Martínez	3	3	0	0
Day 5	Costa Rica vs El Salvador	Group B	(United States) Jair Marrufo	6	6	0	0
Day 6	Trinidad and Tobago vs Canada (Cuba)	Group C	(Canada) David Gantar	4	4	0	0
Day 6	Guatemala vs Mexico	Group C	(Honduras) Armando Castro	7	6	1	0

=== By referee ===
Referee	Matches	Red	Yellow	Red Cards	PKs awarded
(Costa Rica) Henry Bejarano	1	0	4	none	0
(Mexico) César Ramos	1	0	2	none	0
(Mexico) Fernando Guerrero	1	0	1	none	0
(Honduras) Oscar Moncada	1	0	3	none	0
(Panama) John Pitti	1	0	6	none	0
(Costa Rica) Walter Quesada	1	0	0	none	0
(El Salvador) Marlon Mejia	1	1	6	1 second yellow	1
(Costa Rica) Ricardo Montero	1	0	3	none	0
(Cuba) Yadel Martinez	1	0	3	none	0
(United States) Jair Marrufo	1	0	6	none	0
(Canada) David Gantar	1	0	4	none	0
(Honduras) Armando Castro	1	1	6	1 second yellow	0

=== By team ===
Team	Yellow	Red	Red Cards	Reason
Panama	6	1		
Guatemala	6	1		
Trinidad and Tobago	6	0		
Haiti	5	0		
El Salvador	4	0		
Canada	3	0		
Costa Rica	3	0		
Honduras	3	0		
Mexico	2	0		
Cuba	2	0		
Jamaica	1	0		
United States	1	0		

== By player ==
Updated through Match 10

1 red card

- (Panama) Luis Henriquez

2 yellow cards

- (Canada) Nikolas Ledgerwood
- (Canada) Samuel Piette
- (Haiti) Jean Alexandre
- (Panama) Adolfo Machado
- (Trinidad and Tobago) Andre Boucaud

1 yellow card

- (Canada) David Edgar
- (Costa Rica) Joel Campbell
- (Costa Rica) David Guzman
- (Costa Rica) Johan Venegas
- (El Salvador) Darwin Cerén
- (El Salvador) Alexander Larin
- (El Salvador) Alexander Mendoza Espinales
- (El Salvador) Richard Menjivar
- (Guatemala) Carlos Ruiz
- (Haiti) Jean Sony Alcénat
- (Haiti) Wilde-Donald Guerrier
- (Haiti) Duckens Nazon
- (Honduras) Brayan Beckeles
- (Honduras) Jorge Claros
- (Honduras) Johnny Palacios
- (Jamaica) Je-Vaughn Watson
- (Panama) Armando Cooper
- (Panama) Anibal Godoy
- (Panama) Jaime Penedo
- (Panama) Luis Tejada
- (Trinidad and Tobago) Radanfah Abu Bakr
- (Trinidad and Tobago) Daneil Cyrus
- (Trinidad and Tobago) Khaleem Hyland
- (Trinidad and Tobago) Kenwyne Jones
- (United States) John Brooks
