= 2015 CONCACAF Gold Cup final =

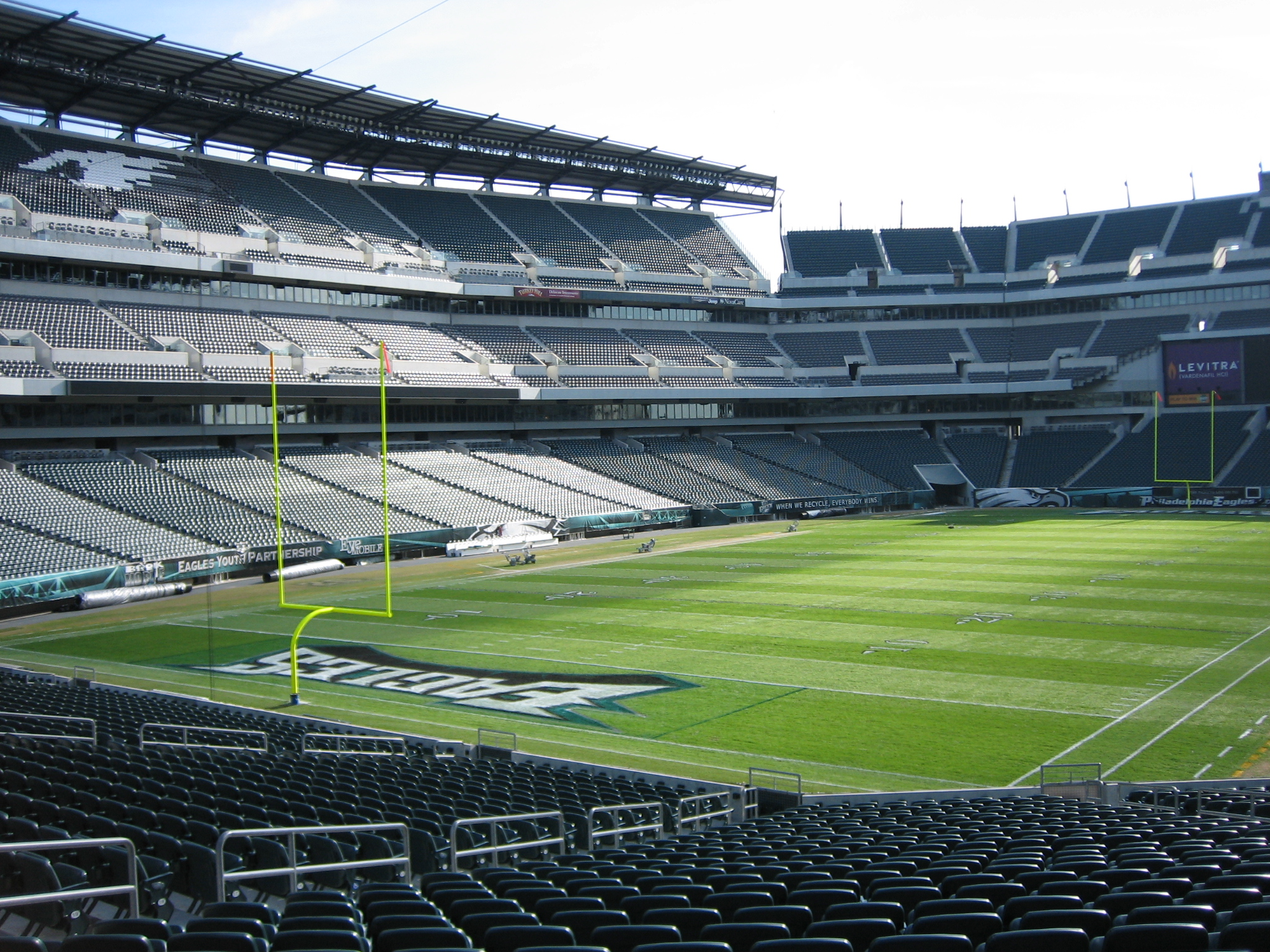
- Lincoln Financial Field in Philadelphia hosted the final
- Event: 2015 CONCACAF Gold Cup
Jamaica	Mexico
(Jamaica)	(Mexico)
1	3
- Date: July 26, 2015
- Venue: Lincoln Financial Field, Philadelphia
- Referee: Joel Aguilar (El Salvador)
- Attendance: 68,930

The 2015 CONCACAF Gold Cup final decided the winners of the 2015 CONCACAF Gold Cup. It was held on July 26, 2015, at Lincoln Financial Field in Philadelphia, and contested by Jamaica and Mexico. It was Jamaica's first final of a CONCACAF championship, and Mexico's 12th; they won a record 10th with a 3–1 victory. It was also the first Gold Cup Final since 2003 not to feature the United States.

Mexico advanced to a one-match play-off, which was held on October 10, 2015, against the 2013 CONCACAF Gold Cup winners, the United States, for the opportunity to represent CONCACAF in the 2017 FIFA Confederations Cup in Russia.

== Route to the final ==
Jamaica		Round	Mexico	
Opponents	Result	Group stage	Opponents	Result
Costa Rica	2–2	Match 1	Cuba	6–0
Canada	1–0	Match 2	Guatemala	0–0
El Salvador	1–0	Match 3	Trinidad and Tobago	4–4
Group B winners: Pos / Team / Pld / Pts; 1 / Jamaica / 3 / 7; 2 / Costa Rica / 3 / 3; 3 / El Salvador / 3 / 2; 4 / Canada (H) / 3 / 2; Source: CONCACAF (H) Hosts		Final standings	Group C runners-up: Pos / Team / Pld / Pts; 1 / Trinidad and Tobago / 3 / 7; 2 / Mexico / 3 / 5; 3 / Cuba / 3 / 3; 4 / Guatemala / 3 / 1; Source: CONCACAF	
Opponents	Result	Knockout stage	Opponents	Result
Haiti	1–0	Quarter-finals	Costa Rica	1–0 (a.e.t.)
United States	2–1	Semi-finals	Panama	2–1 (a.e.t.)

== Match details ==
July 26, 2015
20:00 EDT (UTC−4) (Note: The kickoff time was delayed by 30 minutes.)

Jamaica	1–3	Mexico
Mattocks 79'	Report	Guardado 31'; Corona 46'; Peralta 61'

Lincoln Financial Field, Philadelphia
Attendance: 68,930
Referee: Joel Aguilar (El Salvador)

Jamaica	Mexico

GK	23	Ryan Thompson
RB	19	Adrian Mariappa
CB	3	Michael Hector
CB	4	Wes Morgan
LB	20	Kemar Lawrence	(yellow card) 37'	(substituted off) 55'
RM	22	Garath McCleary		(substituted off) 59'
CM	15	Je-Vaughn Watson	(yellow card) 23'	(substituted off) 88'
CM	17	Rodolph Austin (c)	(yellow card) 30'
LM	10	Jobi McAnuff
CF	18	Simon Dawkins		(substituted off) 73'
CF	9	Giles Barnes
Substitutions:
FW	11	Darren Mattocks		(substituted on) 59'
MF	2	Chris Humphrey		(substituted on) 73'
FW	8	Michael Seaton		(substituted on) 88'
Manager:
(Germany) Winfried Schäfer

GK	13	Guillermo Ochoa
RWB	22	Paul Aguilar
CB	5	Diego Reyes	(yellow card) 34'
CB	2	Francisco Rodríguez
CB	15	Oswaldo Alanís
LWB	7	Miguel Layún
CM	20	Jesús Dueñas	(yellow card) 6'	(substituted off) 85'
CM	8	Jonathan dos Santos
CM	18	Andrés Guardado (c)		(substituted off) 61'
CF	9	Jesús Corona		(substituted off) 81'
CF	19	Oribe Peralta
Substitutions:
DF	17	Jorge Torres Nilo		(substituted on) 61'
MF	21	Carlos Esquivel		(substituted on) 81'
FW	14	Javier Orozco		(substituted on) 85'
Manager:
Miguel Herrera

Assistant referees:
Juan Zumba (El Salvador)
CJ Morgante (United States)
Fourth official:
John Pitti (Panama)
Fifth official:
Leonel Leal (Panama)
