= 2015 CONCACAF Gold Cup Group A =

Group A of the 2015 CONCACAF Gold Cup was one of three groups competing of nations at the 2015 CONCACAF Gold Cup. The group's matches were played in July. All six group matches were played at venues in the United States. Matches were played at Frisco's Toyota Stadium on July 7, Foxborough's Gillette Stadium on July 10 and Kansas City's Sporting Park on July 13.

== Teams ==
Draw position	Team	Zone	Method of qualification	Date of qualification	Finals appearance	Last appearance	Previous best performance	FIFA Rankings	
Draw position	Team	Zone	Method of qualification	Date of qualification	Finals appearance	Last appearance	Previous best performance	November 2014 (Note: The rankings of November 2014 were used for seeding for the draw.)	Start of event
A1	United States	NAFU	Co-hosts / Automatic	N/A	13th	2013	Winners (1991, 2002, 2005, 2007, 2013)	28	27
A2	Panama	UNCAF	2014 Copa Centroamericana third place	September 10, 2014	7th	2013	Runners-up (2005, 2013)	56	54
A3	Haiti	CFU	2014 Caribbean Cup third place	November 16, 2014	6th	2013	Quarter-finals (2002, 2009)	68	76
A4	Honduras	UNCAF	2015 CFU–UNCAF play-off winners	March 29, 2015	12th	2013	Runners-up (1991)	72	75

== Standings ==
Pos	Team	Pld	W	D	L	GF	GA	GD	Pts	Qualification
1	United States (H)	3	2	1	0	4	2	+2	7	Advance to knockout stage
2	Haiti	3	1	1	1	2	2	0	4	Advance to knockout stage
3	Panama	3	0	3	0	3	3	0	3	Advance to knockout stage
4	Honduras	3	0	1	2	2	4	−2	1	

Source: CONCACAF
(H) Hosts

In the quarter-finals:

- United States advanced to play Cuba (third-placed team of Group C).
- Haiti advanced to play Jamaica (winner of Group B).
- Panama (as one of the two best third-placed teams) advanced to play Trinidad and Tobago (winner of Group C).

== Matches ==
All times EDT (UTC−4). If the venue is located in a different time zone, the local time is given in parentheses.

=== Panama vs Haiti ===
July 7, 2015
19:00 (18:00 CDT)

Panama	1–1	Haiti
Quintero 56'	Report	Nazon 86'

Toyota Stadium, Frisco
Attendance: 22,357
Referee: Henry Bejarano (Costa Rica)

Panama	Haiti

GK	1	Jaime Penedo
RB	13	Adolfo Machado	(yellow card) 25'
CB	3	Harold Cummings
CB	5	Román Torres (c)
LB	17	Luis Henríquez
CM	6	Gabriel Gomez
CM	20	Aníbal Godoy	(yellow card) 14'
RW	2	Valentín Pimentel		(substituted off) 84'
LW	19	Alberto Quintero
CF	7	Blas Pérez
CF	10	Luis Tejada		(substituted off) 67'
Substitutions:
CF	22	Abdiel Arroyo		(substituted on) 67'
RW	14	Miguel Camargo		(substituted on) 84'
Manager:
(Colombia) Hernán Darío Gómez

GK	1	Johny Placide
RB	8	Réginal Goreux
CB	5	Jean-Jacques Pierre (c)
CB	3	Mechack Jérôme
LB	4	Kim Jaggy
DM	2	Jean Sony Alcénat	(yellow card) 41'	(substituted off) 71'
RM	7	Wilde-Donald Guerrier
LM	16	Jean Alexandre	(yellow card) 9'
AM	10	Jeff Louis
AM	14	James Marcelin		(substituted off) 71'
CF	9	Kervens Belfort		(substituted off) 80'
Substitutions:
AM	11	Pascal Millien		(substituted on) 71'
DM	21	Jean-Eudes Maurice		(substituted on) 71'
CF	20	Duckens Nazon		(substituted on) 80'
Manager:
(France) Marc Collat

Assistant referees:
Leonel Leal (Costa Rica)
Warner Castro (Costa Rica)
Fourth official:
Ricardo Montero (Costa Rica)

=== United States vs Honduras ===
July 7, 2015
21:30 (20:30 CDT)

United States	2–1	Honduras
Dempsey 25', 64'	Report	Discua 69'

Toyota Stadium, Frisco
Attendance: 22,357
Referee: César Ramos (Mexico)

United States	Honduras

GK	1	Brad Guzan
RB	21	Timothy Chandler		(substituted off) 63'
CB	6	John Brooks	(yellow card) 16'
CB	13	Ventura Alvarado
LB	23	Fabian Johnson
RM	2	DeAndre Yedlin
DM	5	Kyle Beckerman
AM	4	Michael Bradley (c)
LM	20	Gyasi Zardes		(substituted off) 87'
CF	17	Jozy Altidore		(substituted off) 59'
SS	8	Clint Dempsey
Substitutions:
ST	18	Chris Wondolowski		(substituted on) 59'
DF	16	Brad Evans		(substituted on) 63'
MF	19	Graham Zusi		(substituted on) 87'
Manager:
(Germany) Jürgen Klinsmann

GK	22	Donis Escober
RWB	2	Wilmer Crisanto
CB	3	Maynor Figueroa (c)
CB	23	Johnny Palacios	(yellow card) 86'
CB	5	Henry Figueroa		(substituted off) 75'
LWB	21	Brayan Beckeles
RM	10	Mario Martínez		(substituted off) 69'
CM	6	Bryan Acosta
CM	19	Alfredo Mejía
LM	17	Andy Najar		(substituted off) 63'
ST	9	Anthony Lozano
Substitutions:
LM	11	Romell Quioto		(substituted on) 63'
RM	7	Carlos Discua		(substituted on) 69'
CB	13	Eddie Hernández		(substituted on) 75'
Manager:
(Colombia) Jorge Luis Pinto

Assistant referees:
Alberto Morín (Mexico)
Garnet Page (Jamaica)
Fourth official:
Roberto García (Mexico)

=== Honduras vs Panama ===
July 10, 2015
18:00

Honduras	1–1	Panama
Najar 82'	Report	Tejada 21'

Gillette Stadium, Foxborough
Attendance: 46,720
Referee: Marlon Mejía (El Salvador)

Honduras	Panama

GK	22	Donis Escober
RB	2	Wilmer Crisanto
CB	3	Maynor Figueroa (c)
CB	23	Johnny Palacios
CB	5	Henry Figueroa		(substituted off) 62'
LB	21	Brayan Beckeles	(yellow card) 58'
RM	7	Carlos Discua		(substituted off) 62'
CM	6	Bryan Acosta		(substituted off) 86'
CM	20	Jorge Claros	(yellow card) 85'
LM	17	Andy Najar
CF	9	Anthony Lozano
Substitutions:
FW	13	Eddie Hernández		(substituted on) 62'
MF	10	Mario Martínez		(substituted on) 62'
MF	11	Romell Quioto		(substituted on) 86'
Manager:
(Colombia) Jorge Luis Pinto

GK	1	Jaime Penedo
RB	3	Harold Cummings
CB	5	Román Torres (c)
CB	13	Adolfo Machado	(yellow card) 73'
LB	17	Luis Henríquez	(yellow card) 85' (yellow-red card) 90'
RM	6	Gabriel Gómez		(substituted off) 72'
CM	11	Armando Cooper	(yellow card) 77'
CM	19	Alberto Quintero		(substituted off) 87'
LM	20	Aníbal Godoy
CF	10	Luis Tejada	(yellow card) 64'	(substituted off) 67'
CF	7	Blas Pérez
Substitutions:
MF	2	Valentín Pimentel		(substituted on) 67'
FW	22	Abdiel Arroyo		(substituted on) 72'
FW	8	Gabriel Torres		(substituted on) 87'
Manager:
(Colombia) Hernán Darío Gómez

Assistant referees:
Ricardo Morgan (Jamaica)
Garnet Page (Jamaica)
Fourth official:
Joel Aguilar (El Salvador)

=== United States vs Haiti ===
July 10, 2015
20:30

United States	1–0	Haiti
Dempsey 47'	Report

Gillette Stadium, Foxborough
Attendance: 46,720
Referee: Ricardo Montero (Costa Rica)

United States	Haiti

GK	1	Brad Guzan
RB	16	Brad Evans
CB	3	Omar Gonzalez
CB	15	Tim Ream
LB	14	Greg Garza	(substituted off) 67'
RM	19	Graham Zusi
DM	4	Michael Bradley (c)
LM	10	Mix Diskerud
AM	8	Clint Dempsey
SS	9	Aron Jóhannsson	(substituted off) 83'
CF	17	Jozy Altidore	(substituted off) 46'
Substitutions:
FW	20	Gyasi Zardes	(substituted on) 46'
DF	23	Fabian Johnson	(substituted on) 67'
MF	5	Kyle Beckerman	(substituted on) 83'
Manager:
(Germany) Jürgen Klinsmann

GK	1	Johny Placide (c)
RB	8	Réginal Goreux		(substituted off) 83'
CB	3	Mechack Jérôme
CB	6	Frantz Bertin
LB	4	Kim Jaggy
CM	16	Jean Alexandre	(yellow card) 34'
CM	14	James Marcelin
RW	13	Kevin Lafrance		(substituted off) 71'
AM	21	Jean-Eudes Maurice		(substituted off) 66'
LW	7	Wilde-Donald Guerrier	(yellow card) 23'
CF	20	Duckens Nazon	(yellow card) 62'
Substitutions:
LM	10	Jeff Louis		(substituted on) 66'
RM	15	Sébastien Thurière		(substituted on) 71'
CB	22	Sony Norde		(substituted on) 83'
Manager:
(France) Marc Collat

Assistant referees:
Warner Castro (Costa Rica)
José Luis Camargo (Mexico)
Fourth official:
Roberto García (Mexico)

=== Haiti vs Honduras ===
July 13, 2015
19:00 (18:00 CDT)

Haiti	1–0	Honduras
Nazon 14'	Report

Sporting Park, Kansas City
Attendance: 18,467
Referee: Joel Aguilar (El Salvador)

Haiti	Honduras

GK	1	Johny Placide (c)
RB	2	Jean Sony Alcénat
CB	3	Mechack Jérôme
CB	6	Frantz Bertin
LB	4	Kim Jaggy
CM	14	James Marcelin
CM	13	Kevin Lafrance
RW	11	Pascal Millien
LW	7	Wilde-Donald Guerrier	(substituted off) 84'
CF	20	Duckens Nazon	(substituted off) 67'
CF	9	Kervens Belfort	(substituted off) 25'
Substitutions:
FW	21	Jean-Eudes Maurice	(substituted on) 25'
MF	15	Sébastien Thurière	(substituted on) 67'
DF	18	Judelin Aveska	(substituted on) 84'
Manager:
(France) Marc Collat

GK	22	Donis Escober
RB	2	Wilmer Crisanto	(yellow card) 43'
CB	23	Johnny Palacios
CB	3	Maynor Figueroa (c)
LB	21	Brayan Beckeles
CM	19	Alfredo Mejía
CM	20	Jorge Claros
RW	10	Mario Martínez		(substituted off) 65'
LW	17	Andy Najar
CF	9	Anthony Lozano		(substituted off) 46'
CF	15	Erick Andino		(substituted off) 61'
Substitutions:
FW	13	Eddie Hernández		(substituted on) 46'
FW	8	Rubilio Castillo		(substituted on) 61'
MF	7	Carlos Discua		(substituted on) 65'
Manager:
(Colombia) Jorge Luis Pinto

Assistant referees:
Ricardo Morgan (Jamaica)
Garnet Page (Jamaica)
Fourth official:
Marlon Mejía (El Salvador)

=== Panama vs United States ===
July 13, 2015
21:30 (20:30 CDT)

Panama	1–1	United States
Pérez 34'	Report	Bradley 55'

Sporting Park, Kansas City
Attendance: 18,467
Referee: Roberto García (Mexico)

Panama	United States

GK	1	Jaime Penedo
RB	2	Valentín Pimentel		(substituted off) 61'
CB	5	Román Torres (c)
CB	3	Harold Cummings
LB	15	Erick Davis
CM	6	Gabriel Gomez
CM	20	Aníbal Godoy	(yellow card) 44'
RW	11	Armando Cooper
LW	19	Alberto Quintero		(substituted off) 85'
CF	7	Blas Pérez
CF	10	Luis Tejada		(substituted off) 70'
Substitutions:
MF	14	Miguel Camargo		(substituted on) 61'
FW	9	Roberto Nurse		(substituted on) 70'
FW	22	Abdiel Arroyo		(substituted on) 85'
Manager:
(Colombia) Hernán Darío Gómez

GK	1	Brad Guzan
RB	21	Timothy Chandler	(yellow card) 43'
CB	13	Ventura Alvarado	(yellow card) 47'
CB	6	John Brooks	(yellow card) 15'
LB	23	Fabian Johnson
DM	5	Kyle Beckerman
RM	11	Alejandro Bedoya		(substituted off) 70'
AM	4	Michael Bradley (c)
LM	7	Alfredo Morales		(substituted off) 46'
CF	18	Chris Wondolowski		(substituted off) 46'
SS	20	Gyasi Zardes
Substitutions:
MF	2	DeAndre Yedlin		(substituted on) 46'
FW	8	Clint Dempsey		(substituted on) 46'
FW	9	Aron Jóhannsson		(substituted on) 70'
Manager:
(Germany) Jürgen Klinsmann

Assistant referees:
Alberto Morín (Mexico)
Leonel Leal (Costa Rica)
Fourth official:
Henry Bejarano (Costa Rica)
