= 2015 CONCACAF Gold Cup Group B =

Group B of the 2015 CONCACAF Gold Cup was one of three groups competing of nations at the 2015 CONCACAF Gold Cup. The group's matches were played in July. Four group matches were played at venues in the United States and two were played in Canada. Matches were played at Carson's StubHub Center on July 8, Houston's BBVA Compass Stadium on July 11 and Toronto's BMO Field on July 14.

It was the first time Canada hosted a CONCACAF Gold Cup match.

== Teams ==
Draw position	Team	Zone	Method of qualification	Date of qualification	Finals appearance	Last appearance	Previous best performance	FIFA Rankings	
Draw position	Team	Zone	Method of qualification	Date of qualification	Finals appearance	Last appearance	Previous best performance	November 2014 (Note: The rankings of November 2014 were used for seeding for the draw.)	Start of event
B1	Costa Rica	UNCAF	2014 Copa Centroamericana winners	September 7, 2014	12th	2013	Runners-up (2002)	16	14
B2	El Salvador	UNCAF	2014 Copa Centroamericana fourth place	September 10, 2014	9th	2013	Quarter-finals (2002, 2003, 2011, 2013)	93	89
B3	Jamaica	CFU	2014 Caribbean Cup winners	November 16, 2014	9th	2011	Third place (1993)	71	65
B4	Canada	NAFU	Co-hosts / Automatic	N/A	12th	2013	Winners (2000)	110	109

== Standings ==
Pos	Team	Pld	W	D	L	GF	GA	GD	Pts	Qualification
1	Jamaica	3	2	1	0	4	2	+2	7	Advance to knockout stage
2	Costa Rica	3	0	3	0	3	3	0	3	Advance to knockout stage
3	El Salvador	3	0	2	1	1	2	−1	2	
4	Canada (H)	3	0	2	1	0	1	−1	2	

Source: CONCACAF
(H) Hosts

In the quarter-finals:

- Jamaica advanced to play Haiti (runner-up of Group A).
- Costa Rica advanced to play Mexico (runner-up of Group C).

== Matches ==
All times EDT (UTC−4). If the venue is located in a different time zone, the local time is given in parentheses.

=== Costa Rica vs Jamaica ===
July 8, 2015
20:00 (17:00 PDT)

Costa Rica	2–2	Jamaica
Miller 33'; Ramírez 37'	Report	McCleary 13'; McAnuff 48'

StubHub Center, Carson
Attendance: 22,648
Referee: Fernando Guerrero (Mexico)

Costa Rica	Jamaica

GK	23	Esteban Alvarado
RB	16	Cristian Gamboa
CB	3	Giancarlo González
CB	19	Roy Miller
LB	15	Júnior Díaz
RM	5	Celso Borges
CM	17	Johan Venegas	(substituted off) 59'
LM	22	José Miguel Cubero
AM	10	Bryan Ruiz (c)	(substituted off) 69'
AM	12	Joel Campbell
CF	21	David Ramírez	(substituted off) 74'
Substitutions:
FW	9	Álvaro Saborío	(substituted on) 59'
MF	7	Elías Aguilar	(substituted on) 69'
MF	14	Deyver Vega	(substituted on) 74'
Manager:
Paulo Wanchope

GK	13	Dwayne Miller
RB	19	Adrian Mariappa
CB	17	Rodolph Austin (c)
CB	4	Wes Morgan
LB	20	Kemar Lawrence
RM	22	Garath McCleary
CM	21	Jermaine Taylor
CM	15	Je-Vaughn Watson	(yellow card) 64'
LM	10	Jobi McAnuff		(substituted off) 80'
CF	9	Giles Barnes		(substituted off) 61'
CF	18	Simon Dawkins
Substitutions:
FW	11	Darren Mattocks		(substituted on) 61'
DF	6	Lance Laing		(substituted on) 80'
Manager:
(Germany) Winfried Schäfer

Assistant referees:
Hermenerito Leal (Guatemala)
Cristian Ramírez (Honduras)
Fourth official:
Yadel Martínez (Cuba)

=== El Salvador vs Canada ===
July 8, 2015
22:30 (19:30 PDT)

El Salvador	0–0	Canada
	Report

StubHub Center, Carson
Attendance: 22,648
Referee: Óscar Moncada (Honduras)

El Salvador	Canada

GK	22	Derby Carrillo
RB	2	Xavier Garcia
CB	5	Alexander Méndoza
CB	3	Milton Molina
LB	13	Alexander Larín	(yellow card) 56'
CM	20	Pablo Punyed		(substituted off) 86'
CM	10	Jaime Alas		(substituted off) 73'
CM	6	Richard Menjivar
RW	7	Darwin Cerén
LW	12	Arturo Alvarez (c)
CF	11	Nelson Bonilla		(substituted off) 10'
Substitutions:
FW	19	Irvin Herrera		(substituted on) 10'
MF	14	Andrés Flores		(substituted on) 73'
MF	15	Néstor Renderos		(substituted on) 86'
Manager:
(Spain) Albert Roca

GK	22	Kyriakos Stamatopoulos
RB	2	Nikolas Ledgerwood
CB	5	David Edgar (c)
CB	12	Dejan Jakovic
LB	17	Marcel de Jong
CM	23	Tesho Akindele
CM	15	Adam Straith
CM	8	Kyle Bekker	(substituted off) 86'
RWB	9	Tosaint Ricketts
LWB	14	Samuel Piette	(substituted off) 83'
CF	21	Cyle Larin	(substituted off) 69'
Substitutions:
FW	11	Marcus Haber	(substituted on) 69'
MF	7	Russell Teibert	(substituted on) 83'
MF	13	Jonathan Osorio	(substituted on) 86'
Manager:
(Spain) Benito Floro

Assistant referees:
Daniel Williamson (Panama)
CJ Morgante (United States)
Fourth official:
Héctor Rodríguez (Honduras)

=== Jamaica vs Canada ===
July 11, 2015
18:30 (17:30 CDT)

Jamaica	1–0	Canada
Austin 90+2'	Report

BBVA Compass Stadium, Houston
Attendance: 22,017
Referee: Yadel Martínez (Cuba)

Jamaica	Canada

GK	13	Dwayne Miller
RB	19	Adrian Mariappa
CB	4	Wes Morgan
CB	21	Jermaine Taylor
LB	20	Kemar Lawrence
CM	17	Rodolph Austin (c)
CM	15	Je-Vaughn Watson
RW	22	Garath McCleary
LW	10	Jobi McAnuff
CF	18	Simon Dawkins	(substituted off) 64'
CF	9	Giles Barnes
Substitutions:
FW	11	Darren Mattocks	(substituted on) 64'
Manager:
(Germany) Winfried Schäfer

GK	22	Kyriakos Stamatopoulos
RB	2	Nikolas Ledgerwood	(yellow card) 89'
CB	5	David Edgar	(yellow card) 58'
CB	12	Dejan Jakovic
LB	17	Marcel de Jong
RM	14	Samuel Piette	(yellow card) 26'	(substituted off) 79'
CM	15	Adam Straith
LM	6	Julian de Guzman (c)
RF	9	Tosaint Ricketts
CF	21	Cyle Larin		(substituted off) 46'
LF	23	Tesho Akindele		(substituted off) 70'
Substitutions:
FW	11	Marcus Haber		(substituted on) 46'
MF	7	Russell Teibert		(substituted on) 70'
DF	4	André Hainault		(substituted on) 79'
Manager:
(Spain) Benito Floro

Assistant referees:
Hiran Dopico (Cuba)
Cristian Ramírez (Honduras)
Fourth official:
Óscar Moncada (Honduras)

=== Costa Rica vs El Salvador ===
July 11, 2015
21:00 (20:00 CDT)

Costa Rica	1–1	El Salvador
Ruiz 61'	Report	Corea 90+2'

BBVA Compass Stadium, Houston
Attendance: 22,017
Referee: Jair Marrufo (United States)

Costa Rica	El Salvador

GK	23	Esteban Alvarado
RB	2	Francisco Calvo
CB	3	Giancarlo González
CB	19	Roy Miller
LB	8	David Myrie
DM	5	Celso Borges
DM	20	David Guzmán	(yellow card) 90+2'
AM	10	Bryan Ruiz (c)
RW	12	Joel Campbell	(yellow card) 9'	(substituted off) 53'
LW	21	David Ramírez		(substituted off) 63'
CF	9	Álvaro Saborío		(substituted off) 76'
Substitutions:
MF	17	Johan Venegas	(yellow card) 89'	(substituted on) 53'
MF	7	Elías Aguilar		(substituted on) 63'
DF	4	Michael Umaña		(substituted on) 76'
Manager:
Paulo Wanchope

GK	22	Derby Carrillo
RB	2	Xavier Garcia
CB	5	Alexander Méndoza	(yellow card) 56'
CB	3	Milton Molina
LB	13	Alexander Larín
DM	6	Richard Menjivar	(yellow card) 29'
DM	7	Darwin Cerén	(yellow card) 62'
AM	20	Pablo Punyed		(substituted off) 70'
RW	12	Arturo Alvarez (c)
LW	10	Jaime Alas		(substituted off) 77'
CF	19	Irvin Herrera		(substituted off) 63'
Substitutions:
FW	9	Rafael Burgos		(substituted on) 63'
MF	21	Dustin Corea		(substituted on) 70'
MF	8	Jairo Henríquez		(substituted on) 77'
Manager:
(Spain) Albert Roca

Assistant referees:
Charles Morgante (United States)
Gersón López (Guatemala)
Fourth official:
Walter López (Guatemala)

=== Jamaica vs El Salvador ===
July 14, 2015
18:00

Jamaica	1–0	El Salvador
McCleary 72'	Report

BMO Field, Toronto
Attendance: 16,674
Referee: Walter López (Guatemala)

Jamaica	El Salvador

GK	13	Dwayne Miller		(substituted off) 22'
RB	4	Wes Morgan
CB	17	Rodolph Austin (c)	(yellow card) 43'
CB	19	Adrian Mariappa
LB	21	Jermaine Taylor		(substituted off) 8'
CM	10	Jobi McAnuff
CM	15	Je-Vaughn Watson	(yellow card) 65'
RW	20	Kemar Lawrence
LW	22	Garath McCleary	(yellow card) 72'
CF	11	Darren Mattocks	(yellow card) 45' (yellow-red card) 80'
CF	9	Giles Barnes		(substituted off) 69'
Substitutions:
DF	3	Michael Hector		(substituted on) 8'
GK	23	Ryan Thompson		(substituted on) 22'
DF	5	Alvas Powell		(substituted on) 69'
Manager:
(Germany) Winfried Schäfer

GK	22	Derby Carrillo
RB	2	Xavier Garcia	(yellow card) 85'
CB	3	Milton Molina
CB	5	Alexander Méndoza		(substituted off) 76'
LB	6	Richard Menjivar
CM	10	Jaime Alas
CM	13	Alexander Larín
RW	7	Darwin Cerén
LW	14	Andrés Flores (c)	(yellow card) 3'	(substituted off) 61'
CF	19	Irvin Herrera		(substituted off) 60'
CF	20	Pablo Punyed	(yellow card) 68'
Substitutions:
FW	11	Nelson Bonilla		(substituted on) 60'
MF	12	Arturo Alvarez		(substituted on) 61'
MF	21	Dustin Corea		(substituted on) 76'
Manager:
(Spain) Albert Roca

Assistant referees:
Hermenerito Leal (Guatemala)
Gersón López (Guatemala)
Fourth official:
Fernando Guerrero (Mexico)

=== Canada vs Costa Rica ===
July 14, 2015
20:30

Canada	0–0	Costa Rica
	Report

BMO Field, Toronto
Attendance: 16,674
Referee: Héctor Rodríguez (Honduras)

Canada	Costa Rica

GK	22	Kyriakos Stamatopoulos
RB	20	Karl Ouimette
CB	12	Dejan Jakovic
CB	5	David Edgar
LB	17	Marcel de Jong
DM	15	Adam Straith
CM	13	Jonathan Osorio		(substituted off) 68'
CM	6	Julian de Guzman (c)
RW	9	Tosaint Ricketts		(substituted off) 67'
LW	16	Maxim Tissot		(substituted off) 66'
CF	11	Marcus Haber
Substitutions:
FW	21	Cyle Larin		(substituted on) 66'
MF	7	Russell Teibert	(yellow card) 79'	(substituted on) 67'
DF	4	André Hainault		(substituted on) 68'
Manager:
(Spain) Benito Floro

GK	23	Esteban Alvarado
RB	2	Francisco Calvo
CB	15	Júnior Díaz
CB	3	Giancarlo González
LB	16	Cristian Gamboa
CM	20	David Guzmán	(yellow card) 80'	(substituted off) 81'
CM	10	Bryan Ruiz (c)
RW	5	Celso Borges	(yellow card) 67'
LW	14	Deyver Vega		(substituted off) 73'
CF	17	Johan Venegas
CF	21	David Ramírez		(substituted off) 76'
Substitutions:
DF	19	Roy Miller		(substituted on) 73'
FW	12	Joel Campbell		(substituted on) 76'
MF	22	José Miguel Cubero		(substituted on) 81'
Manager:
Paulo Wanchope

Assistant referees:
CJ Morgante (United States)
Daniel Williamson (Panama)
Fourth official:
Jair Marrufo (United States)
