= Wes Morgan =

English footballer (born 1984)

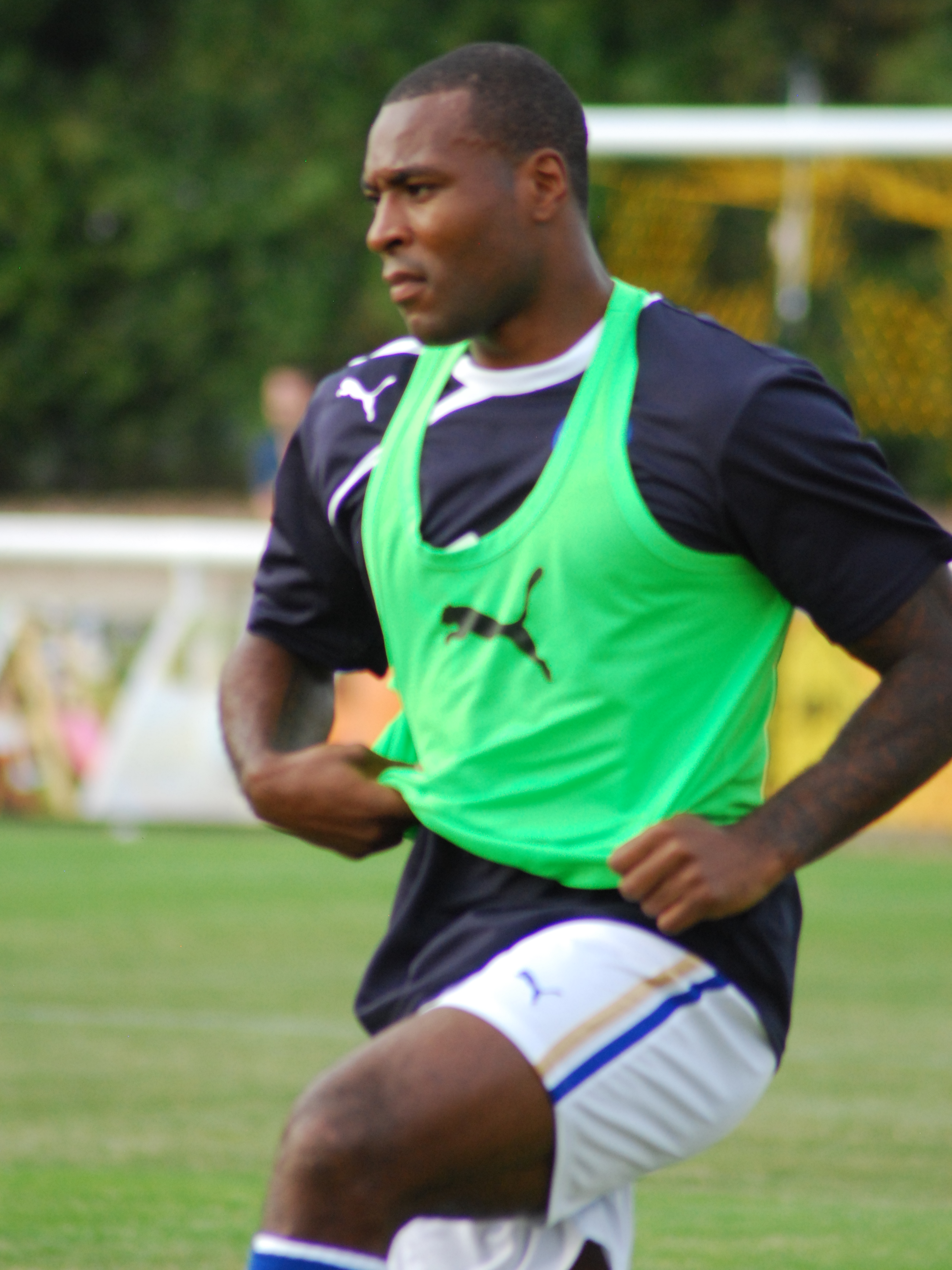
- Morgan training with Leicester City in 2013

Personal information
- Full name: Westley Nathan Morgan
- Date of birth: 21 January 1984 (age 42)
- Place of birth: Nottingham, England
- Height: 6 ft 1 in (1.86 m)
- Position: Centre-back

Youth career
- 1992–1999: Notts County
- 1999–2000: Dunkirk

Senior career*
Years	Team	Apps	(Gls)
2002–2012	Nottingham Forest	352	(12)
2003	→ Kidderminster Harriers (loan)	5	(1)
2012–2021	Leicester City	277	(11)
Total		634	(24)

International career
2013–2016	Jamaica	30	(0)
Medal record
Men's football
Representing Jamaica
CONCACAF Gold Cup
Runner-up	2015 United States–Canada	Team
- * Club domestic league appearances and goals

Westley Nathan Morgan (born 21 January 1984) is a former professional footballer who played as a centre-back. Born in England, he represented the Jamaica national team.

Morgan spent the first ten years of his career with his boyhood club, Nottingham Forest, playing 402 matches and scoring 14 goals. He was their longest-serving player when he transferred to Leicester City in January 2012.

Morgan became Leicester's captain later that year, and captained the club for 9 years until his retirement in 2021. He captained the club during its most successful ever period, captaining them to the Championship title in 2014, their first Premier League title two years later in 2016 and their first FA Cup win in 2021, in which he made his final ever professional appearance coming on as a substitute in the latter competition's final.

Born and raised in England, Morgan chose to represent Jamaica at international level, making his senior debut for the nation in 2013 and was part of their teams that competed in two Copa América tournaments and finished runners-up at the 2015 CONCACAF Gold Cup. He was also the first Jamaican player to score in a UEFA Champions League game.

== Club career ==
=== Nottingham Forest ===
==== Early years ====
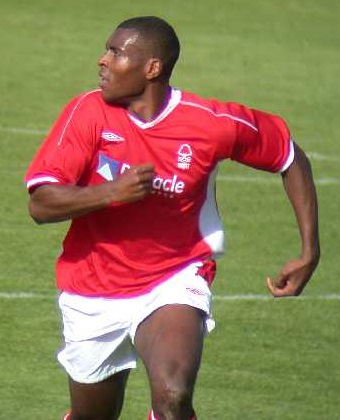
Morgan playing for Nottingham Forest in 2002

Morgan was born in Nottingham. Having been rejected by Nottingham Forest's near neighbours Notts County at the age of 15, he went to study business at South Notts College while playing semi-professionally in central midfield for Dunkirk in the Midland Football Alliance. His performances were tracked by non-League teams and Forest, who took him as an apprentice while he continued studying. There was no transfer fee, but Dunkirk received two Forest kits. Their clubhouse has his Forest and Leicester shirts on the wall.

In February 2003, with manager Paul Hart considering him close to a first-team breakthrough after his reserve performances, Morgan was loaned to Kidderminster Harriers of the Third Division. He made his professional debut on 1 March, playing the full 90 minutes of a 3–1 loss to Scunthorpe United at Aggborough, deflecting a 25-yard Peter Beagrie shot for the first goal. Morgan totalled five appearances for the Worcestershire side, scoring his first goal two weeks after his debut, heading to confirm a 2–0 victory at Cambridge United.

Hart wanted Morgan to lose weight before joining the first team, which became a priority as the team had lost several players after losing in the last season's play-offs. He made his debut at left-back on 12 August 2003 away to Port Vale at the age of 19; after a goalless draw, Forest won a penalty shoot-out to advance to the second round of the League Cup. Four days later he made his First Division debut in a 3–0 loss to Reading; Hart considered him the man of the match. On 18 October, he scored his first goal for Forest, heading Eoin Jess' cross to finish a 6–0 win over bottom team Wimbledon at the City Ground. He totalled 32 games across the season, also scoring an equaliser on 3 December in the home game against Ipswich Town, and was sent off twice over the campaign.

==== First-team regular ====
In the 2007–08 campaign, Morgan missed only four games all season, as he helped Forest finish second in the league and gain promotion from League One to the Championship. His only goal of the season came in a 2–0 victory at Tranmere Rovers, while Forest kept a season-record 24 clean sheets.

Morgan found it hard adapting to life back in the Championship during the first half of the 2008–09 season, with Forest languishing in the relegation zone by Christmas. Following the dismissal of Colin Calderwood on Boxing Day 2008, and the arrival of Billy Davies soon after, Morgan and the Forest defence looked far more solid as the season progressed which eventually led to the Reds retaining their Championship status. At the end of the 2008–09 season he had made a total of 274 appearances in all competitions, including 255 starts.

October 2011 saw Wes Morgan make his 400th appearance for Nottingham Forest against Hull City in a match in which he was also handed the captaincy.

On 20 January 2012, Nottingham Forest announced they rejected a bid for Morgan from local rivals Leicester City.

=== Leicester City ===
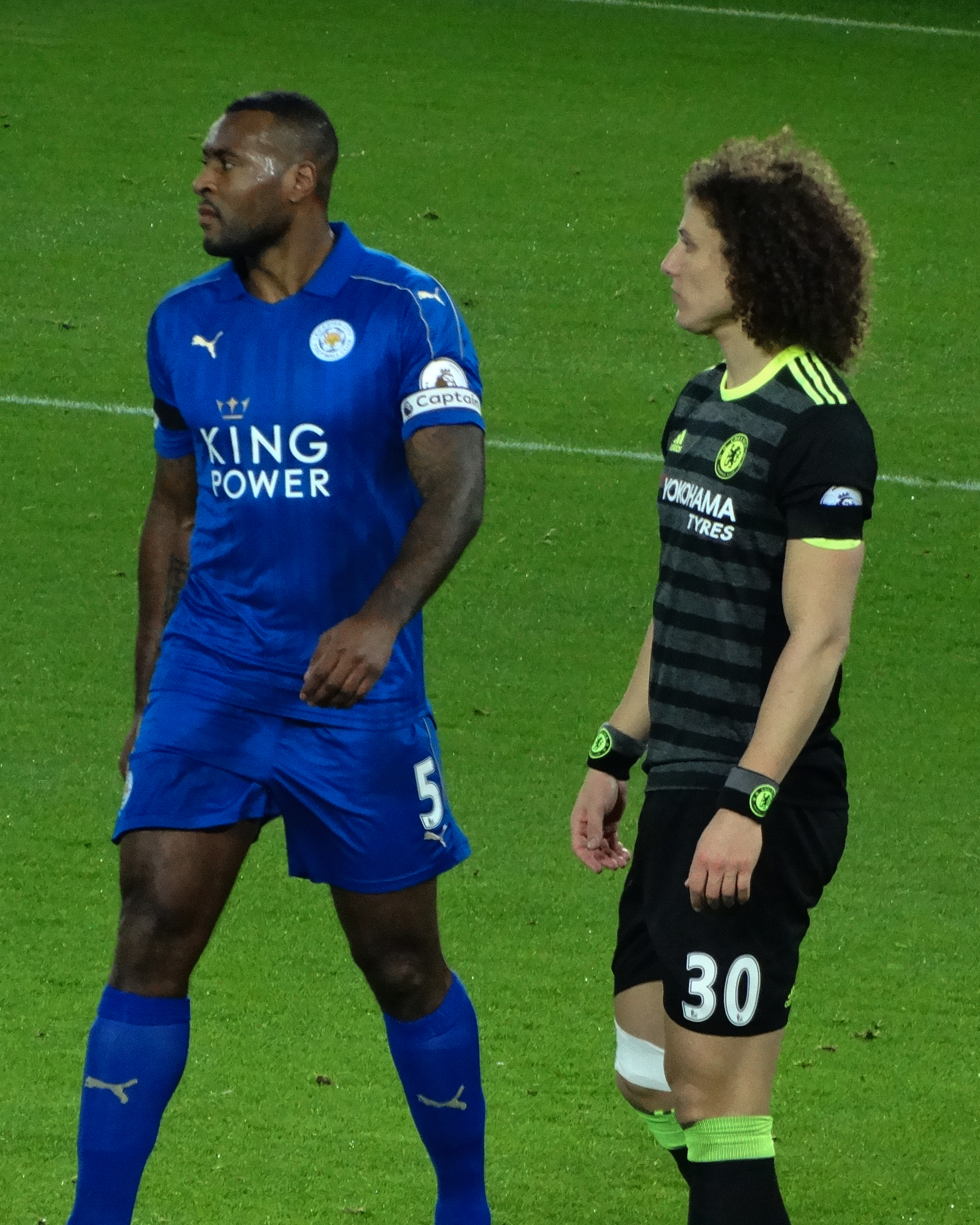
Morgan (left) playing for Leicester City in 2017

On 30 January 2012, Morgan joined East Midland rivals Leicester City for an undisclosed fee believed to be in the region of £1 million. As a result of his performances towards the end of the 2011–12 season, he was rewarded with the Leicester City captaincy ahead of the 2012–13 season. His impressive performances early on earned him a nomination for Championship Player of the Month for September.

Leicester won the 2013–14 Championship, in which he missed only one game. Afterwards, the club used a clause in his would-be expired contract to keep him for another season; he eventually signed a new three-year deal.

In the Premier League for the 2014–15 season, Morgan scored his first goal of the season in a 4–3 defeat to Tottenham Hotspur on 21 March 2015, and another in 3–0 win over Newcastle on the 5 May. On 19 April 2015, Morgan was selected in the "Football Manager Team of the Decade" at the Football League Awards.

Morgan kept his place for the 2015–16 season, playing in every minute of all 38 Premier League matches, one of only 4 players to achieve that accolade (including teammate Kasper Schmeichel) in that season. On 3 April 2016, he scored the only goal against Southampton, despite feeling ill. On 1 May, he equalised with a header in a 1–1 draw with Manchester United at Old Trafford, and the next day Leicester won the title, with Morgan becoming the first Jamaican to win a Premier League medal. After captaining Leicester City to the title, Morgan was included in the Premier League PFA Team of the Year, alongside teammates Jamie Vardy, N'Golo Kanté and Riyad Mahrez. He also became the third outfield player in Premier League history to play every minute of a title-winning season after Gary Pallister in 1992–93 and John Terry in 2014–15.

Manager Claudio Ranieri said "Wes Morgan is Baloo off The Jungle Book. He is a big gentle bear who looks after all the lads. He does not speak so much but when he does speak, everybody listens. He is the perfect captain. I never knew anything about him before I came here. But I watched all the matches, I watched how solid, strong and intelligent he was". On 25 February 2017, reports emerged alleging that Morgan was among several teammates who met with chairman Vichai Srivaddhanaprabha following their 2–1 Champions League defeat at Sevilla on 22 February, which led to Ranieri being sacked.

On 14 March 2017, Morgan scored the first goal in Leicester's 2–0 win against Sevilla, contributing to a 3–2 aggregate score which allowed the club to qualify for the quarter-finals of the UEFA Champions League. This also made him the first Jamaican player to score in a Champions League game.

On 15 May 2021, Morgan came on in the 82nd minute of the 2021 FA Cup final to help Leicester win their first ever FA Cup. On 21 May, Leicester announced that Morgan would retire from professional football at the end of the season.

== International career ==
On 1 September 2013, Morgan was called up to the Jamaican squad for the first time. He made his debut in a 0–0 draw against Panama at the Estadio Rommel Fernández in Panama City on 7 September 2013. Morgan captained the Reggae Boyz for the first time in the 3–1 defeat to Canada on 9 September 2014.

Morgan was part of the Jamaican squad invited to the 2015 Copa América in Chile. He played every minute of their campaign, in which they were eliminated in last place in their group. Weeks later, he was again in the team at the 2015 CONCACAF Gold Cup in the United States and Canada, helping them to their first final. Jamaica lost 3–1 to Mexico at Lincoln Financial Field in Philadelphia.

== Career statistics ==
=== Club ===
Appearances and goals by club, season and competition
Club	Season	League			FA Cup		League Cup		Other		Total	
Club	Season	Division	Apps	Goals	Apps	Goals	Apps	Goals	Apps	Goals	Apps	Goals
Nottingham Forest	2002–03	First Division	0	0	0	0	0	0	0	0	0	0
Nottingham Forest	2003–04	First Division	32	2	1	0	3	0	—		36	2
Nottingham Forest	2004–05	Championship	43	1	4	0	4	0	—		51	1
Nottingham Forest	2005–06	League One	43	2	3	0	1	0	0	0	47	2
Nottingham Forest	2006–07	League One	38	0	5	0	1	0	5 (Note: Three appearances and one goal in Football League Trophy, two appearances in League One play-offs)	1	49	1
Nottingham Forest	2007–08	League One	42	1	1	0	2	0	1 (Note: Appearance in Football League Trophy)	0	46	1
Nottingham Forest	2008–09	Championship	42	1	2	0	2	0	—		46	1
Nottingham Forest	2009–10	Championship	44	3	2	0	3	0	2 (Note: Appearances in Championship play-offs)	0	51	3
Nottingham Forest	2010–11	Championship	46	1	2	0	1	0	2	0	51	1
Nottingham Forest	2011–12	Championship	22	1	0	0	3	1	—		25	2
Nottingham Forest	Total		352	12	20	0	20	1	10	1	402	14
Kidderminster Harriers (loan)	2002–03	Third Division	5	1	—		—		—		5	1
Leicester City	2011–12	Championship	17	0	2	0	—		—		19	0
Leicester City	2012–13	Championship	45	1	3	0	1	0	2	0	51	1
Leicester City	2013–14	Championship	45	2	0	0	3	1	—		48	3
Leicester City	2014–15	Premier League	37	2	3	0	0	0	—		40	2
Leicester City	2015–16	Premier League	38	2	0	0	0	0	—		38	2
Leicester City	2016–17	Premier League	27	1	2	1	1	0	10 (Note: One appearance in FA Community Shield, nine appearances and one goal in UEFA Champions League)	1	40	3
Leicester City	2017–18	Premier League	32	0	2	0	1	0	—		35	0
Leicester City	2018–19	Premier League	22	3	1	0	2	0	—		25	3
Leicester City	2019–20	Premier League	11	0	2	0	4	0	—		17	0
Leicester City	2020–21	Premier League	3	0	1	0	1	0	5 (Note: Appearances in UEFA Europa League)	0	10	0
Leicester City	Total		277	11	16	1	13	1	17	1	323	14
Career total			634	24	36	1	33	2	27	1	730	29

=== International ===
Appearances and goals by national team and year
National team	Year	Apps	Goals
Jamaica	2013	4	0
Jamaica	2014	6	0
Jamaica	2015	13	0
Jamaica	2016	7	0
Total		30	0

== Honours ==
Leicester City

- Premier League: 2015–16
- Football League Championship: 2013–14
- FA Cup: 2020–21

Jamaica

- CONCACAF Gold Cup runner-up: 2015

Individual

- PFA Team of the Year: 2010–11 Championship, 2012–13 Championship, 2013–14 Championship, 2015–16 Premier League
- The Football League Team of the Decade
- Leicester City Player of the Season: 2012–13
- Leicester City Players' Player of the Season: 2012–13
- CONCACAF Best XI: 2016
