= Rodolph Austin =

Jamaican footballer (born 1985)

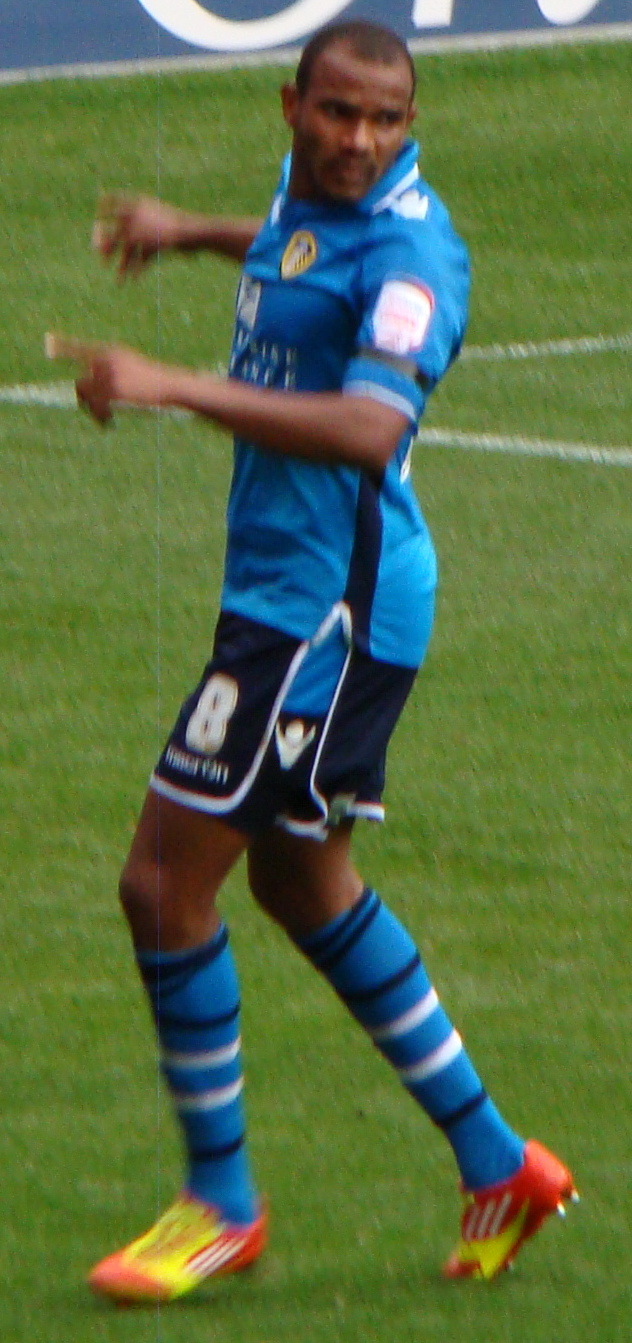
- Austin playing for Leeds United in 2012

Personal information
- Full name: Rodolph William Austin
- Date of birth: 1 June 1985 (age 41)
- Place of birth: Clarendon Parish, Jamaica
- Height: 1.83 m (6 ft 0 in)
- Position: Midfielder

Senior career*
Years	Team	Apps	(Gls)
2005–2009	Portmore United	75	(6)
2008–2012	SK Brann	90	(15)
2012–2015	Leeds United	101	(8)
2015–2017	Brøndby	40	(2)
2017–2021	Esbjerg fB	93	(7)
2022–2024	Portmore United	50	(2)
Total		449	(40)

International career^{‡}
2004–2016	Jamaica	88	(7)
Medal record
Men's football
Representing Jamaica
CONCACAF Gold Cup
Runner-up	2015 United States–Canada	Team
- * Club domestic league appearances and goals ‡ National team caps and goals as of 2 November 2026

Rodolph William Austin (born 1 June 1985) is a Jamaican former professional footballer who last played as a midfielder for Portmore United.

Austin is a central midfielder who has played as an attacking midfielder and a central defender.

He began his career at Portmore United, where he won two Jamaica National Premier League titles and the CFU Club Championship. In 2008, he moved to Norway's Brann, contesting four Tippeligaen seasons before moving to Leeds United in July 2012. He spent three seasons at the Championship club, scoring eight goals in 101 appearances, and briefly captained the side.

Austin is captain of the Jamaica national team, for whom he debuted in 2004. He was part of their squads in three victorious Caribbean Cup tournaments, as well as three CONCACAF Gold Cups and the 2015 Copa América.

== Club career ==
=== Portmore United ===
Austin started his career at Portmore United in Jamaica, scoring six goals in 75 appearances whilst winning the two domestic league titles and the CFU Club Championship.

=== Brann ===
An attempt by Stoke City to bring Austin to the club failed in August 2008, when he was refused a work permit on appeal. Austin went on to sign a one-year loan deal with Brann, after an agreement was reached between Brann, Portmore United and Stoke. Stoke would have the option to buy the player until 1 February 2009, and if they opted not to buy the player, Brann would have the option to buy until 30 June.

Austin made his Brann debut in the 1–3 defeat against Bodø/Glimt on 31 August 2008, coming on as a substitute in the last 20 minutes. He debuted in European competition three weeks later with a 2–0 win against Deportivo de La Coruña in the UEFA Cup. Stoke did not activate their option because Austin could not get a work permit in England, and on 27 February 2009, Austin signed a four-year deal with Brann in a transfer worth £1,000,000.

In January 2011, Austin was subject to a bid from Queens Park Rangers under manager Neil Warnock after a trial spell at the club, however Brann rejected the bid. After playing 25 matches and scoring seven goals during the 2011 season, Austin won the SK Brann Player of the Season award. He also won the NISO Award as the best player in the 2011 Tippeligaen.

On 13 July 2012, Austin was linked with a move to Leeds United, where Warnock was now in charge after being sacked by QPR in 2011, and Leeds were said to have had a £200,000 bid rejected. Austin revealed he was hoping the move would be completed, revealing that former Leeds player and former Brann teammate Eirik Bakke was a big influence on his desire to join the club. Austin scored a long range effort against Aalesund on 22 July to help earn SK Brann a 2–1 victory, with Austin picking up his 5th booking of the season and as a result a one match ban he revealed it would be his last game for the club.

=== Leeds United ===
==== 2012–13 season ====
On 23 July, SK Brann revealed they had accepted a bid from Leeds United for Austin. Leeds United confirmed the transfer later that day, subject to Austin successfully obtaining a work permit. Austin was given the number 8 shirt at Leeds for the 2012–13 season.

Austin made his competitive début for Leeds in the first game of the season against Shrewsbury Town in the League Cup on 11 August, followed by a league début for Leeds in their 1–0 victory against Wolverhampton Wanderers. His first goal for the club came in August 2012 in a League Cup match against Oxford United, his first league goal coming against Cardiff City from a free kick in September 2012. Austin scored a further League Cup goal in Leeds' 2–1 victory against Premiership side Everton in the same month. After picking up an injury on international duty, Austin was rested for the match against Charlton Athletic on 23 October.

In a game against Watford in November of the same year, following his stretchering off due to what was initially suspected as broken a leg the game saw Leeds go down to nine men, with Jason Pearce having already received a red card for Leeds. Scans after the game revealed Austin had not broken his leg but had however cracked his ankle bone and would be ruled out for several months.

Austin returned from injury several months ahead of schedule when he came back into the starting line-up against Nottingham Forest on 26 December. He scored an own goal in a 4–2 loss. He was sent off for an elbow on Ashley Barnes in Leeds 2–1 loss against Brighton & Hove Albion on 27 April. The subsequent three match ban meant that Austin missed the first two matches of the 2013–14 season.

==== 2013–14 season ====
After missing the first two games of the season through suspension, Austin was named the new permanent captain of Leeds United on 11 August 2013 after returning to the side from suspension against Leicester City, replacing previous captain Lee Peltier. Austin received the Man of The Match Award in the same game for his impressive performance. Upon being named the new captain, Austin spoke of the role being a "big honour".

After a shock 2–0 FA Cup defeat against Rochdale on 4 January 2014 and then a 6–0 defeat against Sheffield Wednesday, on 11 January Austin spoke with the club manager Brian McDermott and decided to step down as the club captain; the captaincy was handed over to Ross McCormack.

==== 2014–15 season ====
On 1 August, Austin was assigned the Leeds number 4 shirt for the 2014–15 season. On 20 September, Austin scored his first goal of the season in a 3–0 win over local rivals Huddersfield Town. His second goal of the season came from a penalty in the 1–1 draw against Bolton Wanderers on 10 January 2015. On 2 February 2015, transfer deadline day, Leeds put out a statement after significant interest from clubs including Wigan Athletic that Austin would not be sold and would be staying at the club, with Austin also expressing his desire to stay at Leeds.

On 28 February 2015, Austin scored a long range volley for Leeds in a 3–2 defeat against Watford. On 4 April, Austin was given a straight red card and a three-game ban for an off the ball incident against Blackburn Rovers in a 3–0 defeat.

On 2 May 2015, Austin won the Goal Of The Season award at Leeds United's official end of 2014–15 season awards ceremony for his strike against Watford. On 13 May 2015, Austin's contract was not renewed by Leeds and he was released by the club.

==== Work permit denied ====
On 30 July 2015, after agreeing a three-year deal with Sheffield Wednesday, it was revealed that the move was cancelled as Austin was not to be given a work permit due to new Football Association rules, wherein a non-European Union player has to represent a country in FIFA's top 50 rankings over the two years prior. Austin's agent Darryl Powell described the situation as "traumatic", since Austin's wife and young son lived in England.

=== Brøndby IF ===
After being denied a work permit to be able to England, Austin signed with the Danish side Brøndby, on a two-year contract. He left the club when his contract expired in the summer of 2017.

=== Esbjerg fB ===
After leaving Brøndby, Austin signed for newly relegated Danish 1st Division club Esbjerg on 16 July 2017. He signed a two-year contract and got shirt number 8. After four years in Esbjerg, Austin left the club at the end of the 2020–21 season.

=== Portmore United ===
Austin rejoined his boyhood club Portmore United on 1 January 2022.

== International career ==
Austin has featured for Jamaica U20, U23 and senior national teams since 2005. He won the Caribbean Cup with Jamaica in 2008, again in 2010, and again in 2014. He was named Most Valuable Player for the tournament in 2010 and 2014.

Austin scored a freekick in a famous victory for Jamaica against USA on 7 September 2012, to help earn Jamaica a historic 2–1 victory to beat the United States for the first time in 19 matches.

He won the Caribbean Cup for the third time, and his second MVP award, as Jamaica captain in the 2014 edition, scoring the winning goal in a 4–3 penalty shootout victory over Trinidad and Tobago.

Austin captained Jamaica at the 2015 Copa América, their first entry into the South American championship. He played every minute of their campaign, as they were eliminated from the group stage, losing all three matches and not scoring, including facing Lionel Messi in Jamaica's 1–0 defeat against Argentina, a game which saw Messi win his 100th Cap for Argentina.

Later in 2015, Austin captained Jamaica to their first ever final of the Gold Cup, scoring one goal in the process, before losing 3–1 to Mexico in the final.

In the 2016 Copa Americana, Austin received a straight red in the opening game versus Venezuela after a harsh challenge in the 24th minute.

== Coaching career ==
Since his retirement, Austin has been coaching in Jamaica with his former club, Portmore United. Austin and Portmore United won the JPL title 2025–2026.

In addition, Austin serves as the national u20 coach.

== In media ==
Austin featured in Brann's 2011 Cup final song by Fjorden Baby! The song was a remake of the song "World in Motion..." by English band New Order. Austin rapped the part that was made famous by Jamaican-born England international John Barnes.

== Career statistics ==
=== Club ===
As of 2 March 2020

Appearances and goals by club, season and competition
Club	Season	League			Cup		Continental		Total	
Club	Season	Division	Apps	Goals	Apps	Goals	Apps	Goals	Apps	Goals
Brann	2008	Tippeligaen	8	2	0	0	2	0	10	2
Brann	2009	Tippeligaen	20	2	4	1	0	0	24	3
Brann	2010	Tippeligaen	25	0	1	0	0	0	26	0
Brann	2011	Tippeligaen	25	7	5	1	0	0	30	8
Brann	2012	Tippeligaen	12	4	4	0	0	0	16	4
Brann	Total		90	15	14	2	2	0	106	17
Leeds United	2012–13	Championship	31	2	7	2	0	0	38	4
Leeds United	2013–14	Championship	40	3	3	0	0	0	43	3
Leeds United	2014–15	Championship	30	3	1	0	0	0	31	3
Leeds United	Total		101	8	11	2	0	0	112	10
Brøndby IF	2015–16	Danish Superliga	17	1	2	0	0	0	19	1
Brøndby IF	2016–17	Danish Superliga	23	1	3	1	3	0	29	2
Brøndby IF	Total		40	2	5	1	3	0	48	3
Esbjerg fB	2017–18	Danish 1st Division	21	1	0	0	0	0	21	1
Esbjerg fB	2018–19	Danish Superliga	21	4	1	0	0	0	22	4
Esbjerg fB	2019–20	Danish Superliga	19	1	0	0	0	0	19	1
Esbjerg fB	Total		61	6	1	0	0	0	62	2
Career total			292	31	31	5	5	0	328	36

=== International ===
Scores and results list Jamaica's goal tally first, score column indicates score after each Austin goal.

List of international goals scored by Rodolph Austin
No.	Date	Venue	Opponent	Score	Result	Competition
1	18 November 2007	Independence Park, Kingston, Jamaica	El Salvador	1–0	3–0	Friendly
2	3 December 2008	Independence Park, Kingston, Jamaica	Barbados	1–1	2–1	2008 Caribbean Cup
3	11 August 2010	Marvin Lee Stadium, Macoya, Trinidad and Tobago	Trinidad and Tobago	2–1	3–1	Friendly
4	7 September 2012	Independence Park, Kingston, Jamaica	United States	1–1	2–1	2014 FIFA World Cup qualification
5	15 October 2013	Independence Park, Kingston, Jamaica	Honduras	2–2	2–2	2014 FIFA World Cup qualification
6	14 November 2014	Montego Bay Sports Complex, Montego Bay, Jamaica	Antigua and Barbuda	3–0	3–0	2014 Caribbean Cup
7	11 July 2015	BBVA Compass Stadium, Houston, United States	Canada	1–0	1–0	2015 CONCACAF Gold Cup

=== Managerial ===
As of match played 3 June 2026

Managerial record by team and tenure
Team	From	To	Record					Ref.
Team	From	To	P	W	D	L	Win %	Ref.
Portmore United	1 July 2024	Present	86	38	29	19	44.2	
Jamaica u20	4 December 2025	Present	5	5	0	0	100.0	
Total			91	43	29	19	47.3	

== Honours ==
Portmore United ' Lynk Cup: 2023

Jamaica Premier League: 2025-26

Individual

- Verdens Gang Norwegian Premier League Player of the Year: 2011
