= Valentín Pimentel =

Panamanian footballer (born 1991)

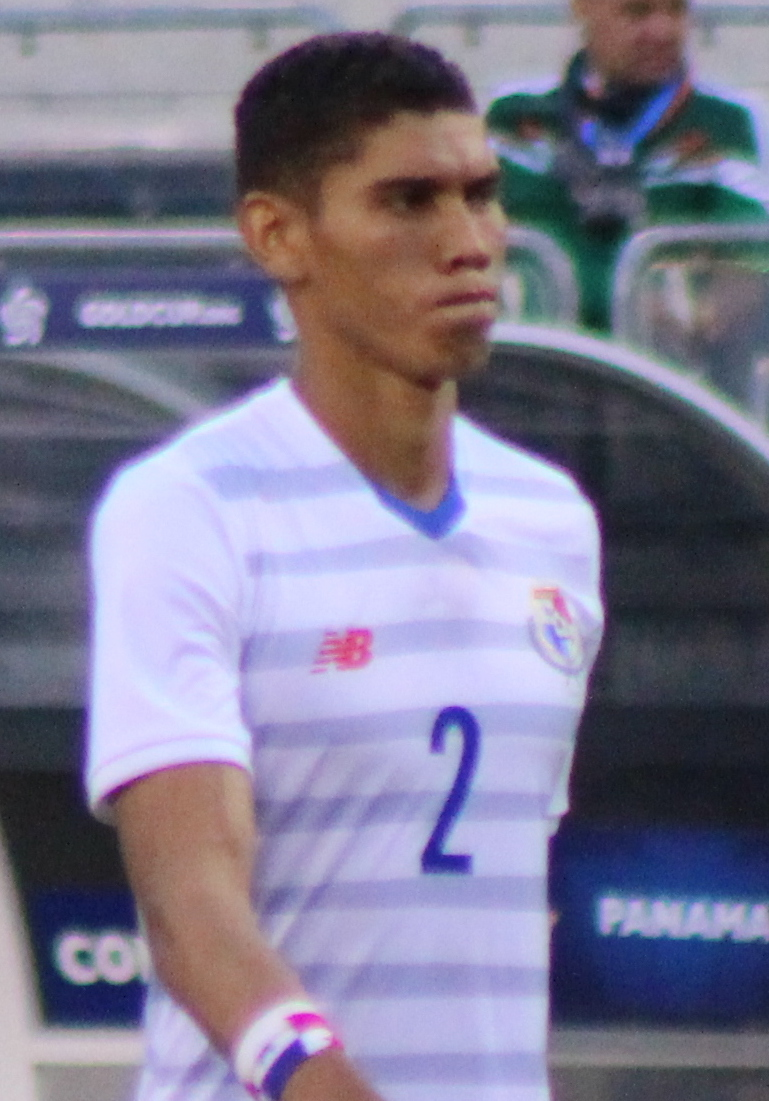
- Pimentel with Panama at the 2015 CONCACAF Gold Cup

Personal information
- Full name: Valentín Enrique Pimentel Armuelles
- Date of birth: 30 May 1991 (age 35)
- Place of birth: Santa Ana, Panama City, Panama
- Height: 1.89 m (6 ft 2 in)
- Positions: Midfielder; forward

Team information
- Current team: San Francisco
- Number: 20

Youth career
- Chepo

Senior career*
| Years | Team | Apps | (Gls) |
| 2013–2015 | SUNTRACS | 0 | (0) |
| 2014–2015 | → Plaza Amador (loan) | 38 | (9) |
| 2016–2017 | La Equidad | 12 | (0) |
| 2017–2019 | Plaza Amador | 48 | (5) |
| 2019 | Costa del Este | 33 | (9) |
| 2020 | Deportivo Lara | 3 | (1) |
| 2020-2021 | Costa del Este | 9 | (2) |
| 2021–2024 | Sporting San Miguelito | 80 | (14) |
| 2025 | Herrera | 22 | (3) |
| 2026 | Universitario | 15 | (2) |
| 2026– | San Francisco | 0 | (0) |

International career^{‡}
| 2015–2019 | Panama | 28 | (1) |
- * Club domestic league appearances and goals as of 19:48, 5 March 2024 (UTC) ‡ National team caps and goals as of 22:26, 19 November 2019 (UTC)

Valentín Enrique Pimentel Armuelles (born 30 May 1991) is a Panamanian footballer who plays for San Francisco and the Panama national football team.

== Club career ==
Born in Santa Ana, Pimentel played for the Chepo youth team and for second division teams Vista Alegre and SUNTRACS before joining Plaza Amador.

== International career ==
He made his debut for Panama in a June 2015 friendly match against Ecuador and he was called up to the Panama team for the 2015 CONCACAF Gold Cup; he played in Panama's opening game.

In May 2018 he was named in Panama's 23-man squad for the 2018 FIFA World Cup in Russia.

== Personal life ==
Pimentel studies at Panama University to earn a degree in shipping company management. He has a son with his wife Maria Fernanda Carrillo.

== Career statistics ==
=== International ===
As of 28 June 2018

Panama
| Year | Apps | Goals |
|---|---|---|
| 2015 | 11 | 1 |
| 2016 | 6 | 0 |
| 2017 | 2 | 0 |
| 2018 | 4 | 0 |
| Total | 23 | 1 |

=== International goals ===
Scores and results list Panama's goal tally first.

| No | Date | Venue | Opponent | Score | Result | Competition |
|---|---|---|---|---|---|---|
| 1. | 8 October 2015 | Estadio Rommel Fernández, Panama City, Panama | Trinidad and Tobago | 1–2 | 1–2 | Friendly |

== Honours ==
Panama

- CONCACAF Gold Cup third place: 2015
