= Garath McCleary =

Jamaican footballer (born 1987)

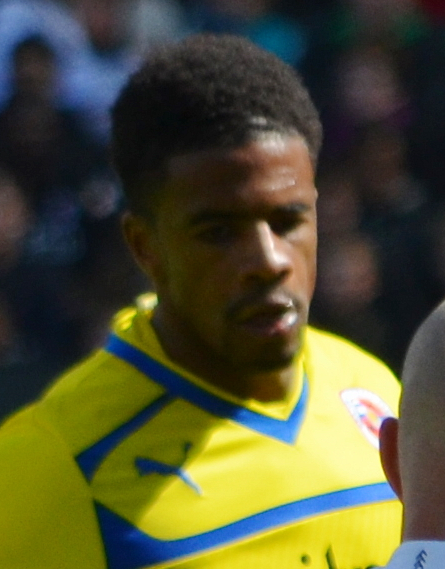
- McCleary playing for Reading in 2013

Personal information
- Full name: Garath James McCleary
- Date of birth: 15 May 1987 (age 39)
- Place of birth: Oxford, England
- Height: 6 ft 0 in (1.83 m)
- Positions: Right winger; attacking midfielder

Team information
- Current team: Gillingham
- Number: 12

Youth career
- 2004–2005: Oxford United

Senior career*
Years	Team	Apps	(Gls)
2004–2005	Oxford City	22	(3)
2005–2007	Slough Town	33	(7)
2007–2008	Bromley	24	(8)
2008–2012	Nottingham Forest	111	(13)
2012–2020	Reading	242	(23)
2020–2025	Wycombe Wanderers	196	(32)
2025–	Gillingham	27	(4)

International career^{‡}
2013–2016	Jamaica	24	(3)
Medal record
Men's football
Representing Jamaica
CONCACAF Gold Cup
Runner-up	2015 United States–Canada	Team
- * Club domestic league appearances and goals as of 10:42, 29 July 2026 (UTC) ‡ National team caps and goals as of 14:39, 21 November 2016 (UTC)

Garath James McCleary (born 15 May 1987) is a professional footballer who plays as a right winger or attacking midfielder for EFL League Two club Gillingham. Born in England, he played for the Jamaica national team.

== Club career ==
=== Early career ===
McCleary was born in Oxford, Oxfordshire. His football career began with Oxford City, and spent time with Oxford United but never signed a contract with the team despite spending three months with the club.

He joined Slough Town playing in 24 games and scoring on six occasions. He then moved to Bromley in January 2007. In total McCleary made over 40 appearances for Bromley scoring 11 goals. Nottingham Forest manager Colin Calderwood offered him a trial where he did well enough to secure a contract on 31 January 2008.

=== Nottingham Forest ===
McCleary made his first team debut as an 87th-minute substitute, in a 1–0 home defeat against Carlisle United, on 3 March 2008. He scored his first goal for the club on 1 April 2008 in injury time, in a 2–0 win at Carlisle. On 5 April he was handed his first start where he was voted Man of the Match as Forest beat Cheltenham Town 3–1 at the City Ground.

In the 2011/12 season McCleary scored nine goals after returning from injury in December 2011; six of which came in March 2012. Four came in a high-scoring game away to Leeds United at Elland Road, where Forest won 7–3. These performances resulted in McCleary being named as the Football League Championship Player of the Month. He was voted Forest's Player of the Season by the Forest supporters, beating Joel Lynch and Chris Gunter into second and third respectively.

=== Reading ===
On 16 May 2012 it was announced that McCleary had turned down a new contract at Forest and instead signed a three-year contract at Reading and fulfill his dream of playing in the Premier League. His first goal for Reading came in a 3–3 draw with Fulham.

McCleary signed a new contract with Reading on 3 October 2014, keeping at the club until the summer of 2017, before again extending it on 17 January 2017, this time until the summer of 2020.

=== Wycombe Wanderers ===
On 4 November 2020, it was announced by Wycombe Wanderers manager during a live webcast that the club had signed McCleary, who had been training with the club as a free transfer until the end of the current season. He scored his first goal for Wycombe in a 2–2 draw against Preston North End on 5 December 2020.

=== Gillingham ===
On 1 September 2025, McCleary joined Gillingham on a one-year deal, with the option of a further 12 months.

== International career ==
In October 2012 he was earmarked by the Jamaica Football Federation to play for Jamaica during their 2014 World Cup qualifying campaign. He received his first call up on 24 January 2013 alongside Reading teammates Jobi McAnuff and Adrian Mariappa for the World Cup qualifier against Mexico on 6 February. McCleary started the match and helped Jamaica to a 0–0 draw at the Estadio Azteca.

== Career statistics ==
=== Club ===
As of match played 26 October 2024

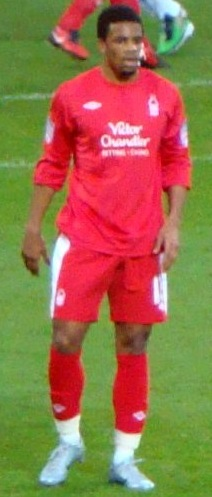
McCleary playing for Nottingham Forest in 2010

Appearances and goals by club, season and competition
Club	Season	League			FA Cup		League Cup		Other		Total	
Club	Season	Division	Apps	Goals	Apps	Goals	Apps	Goals	Apps	Goals	Apps	Goals
Oxford City	2004–05	Southern West	22	3	1	0	—		6 (Note: Two appearances and two goals in the FA Trophy, one appearance and one goal in the Southern League Cup and three appearances in the Oxfordshire Senior Cup)	3	29	6
Slough Town	2005–06	Isthmian Premier	24	7	0	0	—		7 (Note: Five appearances and two goals in the Isthmian League Cup, two appearances in the Berks & Bucks Senior Cup)	2	31	9
Slough Town	2006–07	Isthmian Premier	9	0	1	0	—		1 (Note: Appearance in the Isthmian League Cup)	0	11	0
Slough Town	Total		33	7	1	0	—		8	2	42	9
Bromley	2006–07	Isthmian Premier	6	2	0	0	—		9	1	15	3
Bromley	2007–08	Conference South	18	6	4	2	—		5	0	27	8
Bromley	Total		24	8	4	2	—		14	1	42	11
Nottingham Forest	2007–08	League One	8	1	0	0	0	0	0	0	8	1
Nottingham Forest	2008–09	Championship	39	1	2	0	2	0	—		43	1
Nottingham Forest	2009–10	Championship	24	0	2	0	1	0	0	0	27	0
Nottingham Forest	2010–11	Championship	18	2	2	0	1	0	1 (Note: Appearances in the Championship play-offs)	0	22	2
Nottingham Forest	2011–12	Championship	22	9	1	0	0	0	—		23	9
Nottingham Forest	Total		111	13	7	0	4	0	1	0	123	13
Reading	2012–13	Premier League	31	3	3	1	3	0	—		37	4
Reading	2013–14	Championship	42	5	1	0	0	0	—		43	5
Reading	2014–15	Championship	26	1	4	2	0	0	—		30	3
Reading	2015–16	Championship	34	4	2	0	2	1	—		38	5
Reading	2016–17	Championship	41	9	1	0	1	0	2	0	45	9
Reading	2017–18	Championship	18	0	2	0	1	0	—		21	0
Reading	2018–19	Championship	31	0	1	0	0	0	—		32	0
Reading	2019–20	Championship	19	1	5	0	0	0	—		24	1
Reading	Total		242	23	19	3	7	1	2	0	270	27
Wycombe Wanderers	2020–21	Championship	32	4	1	0	0	0	—		33	4
Wycombe Wanderers	2021–22	League One	42	11	0	0	0	0	4 (Note: One appearance in the EFL Trophy, three appearances in the EFL League One play-offs)	0	46	11
Wycombe Wanderers	2022–23	League One	39	7	0	0	0	0	—		39	7
Wycombe Wanderers	2023–24	League One	40	6	1	0	1	0	7 (Note: Appearance(s) in the EFL Trophy)	0	49	6
Wycombe Wanderers	2024–25	League One	43	4	3	0	3	0	3 (Note: One appearance in the EFL Trophy, two appearances in the EFL League One play-offs)	0	52	4
Wycombe Wanderers	Total		196	32	5	0	4	0	14	0	219	32
Career total			628	86	37	5	15	1	45	6	725	98

=== International ===
As of match played 2 September 2016.

International statistics
National team	Year	Apps	Goals
Jamaica	2013	7	0
Jamaica	2014	1	1
Jamaica	2015	11	2
Jamaica	2016	5	0
Total		24	3

=== International goals ===
Scores and results list Jamaica's goal tally first.

No	Date	Venue	Opponent	Score	Result	Competition
1.	5 March 2014	Beauséjour Stadium, Gros Islet, Saint Lucia	Saint Lucia	3–0	5–0	Friendly
2.	8 July 2015	StubHub Center, Carson, United States	Costa Rica	1–0	2–2	2015 CONCACAF Gold Cup
3.	14 July 2015	BMO Field, Toronto, Canada	El Salvador	1–0	1–0	2015 CONCACAF Gold Cup

== Honours ==
Wycombe Wanderers

- EFL Trophy runner-up: 2023–24

Individual

- Nottingham Forest Player of the Season: 2011–12
