= Abdiel Arroyo =

Panamanian footballer (born 1993)

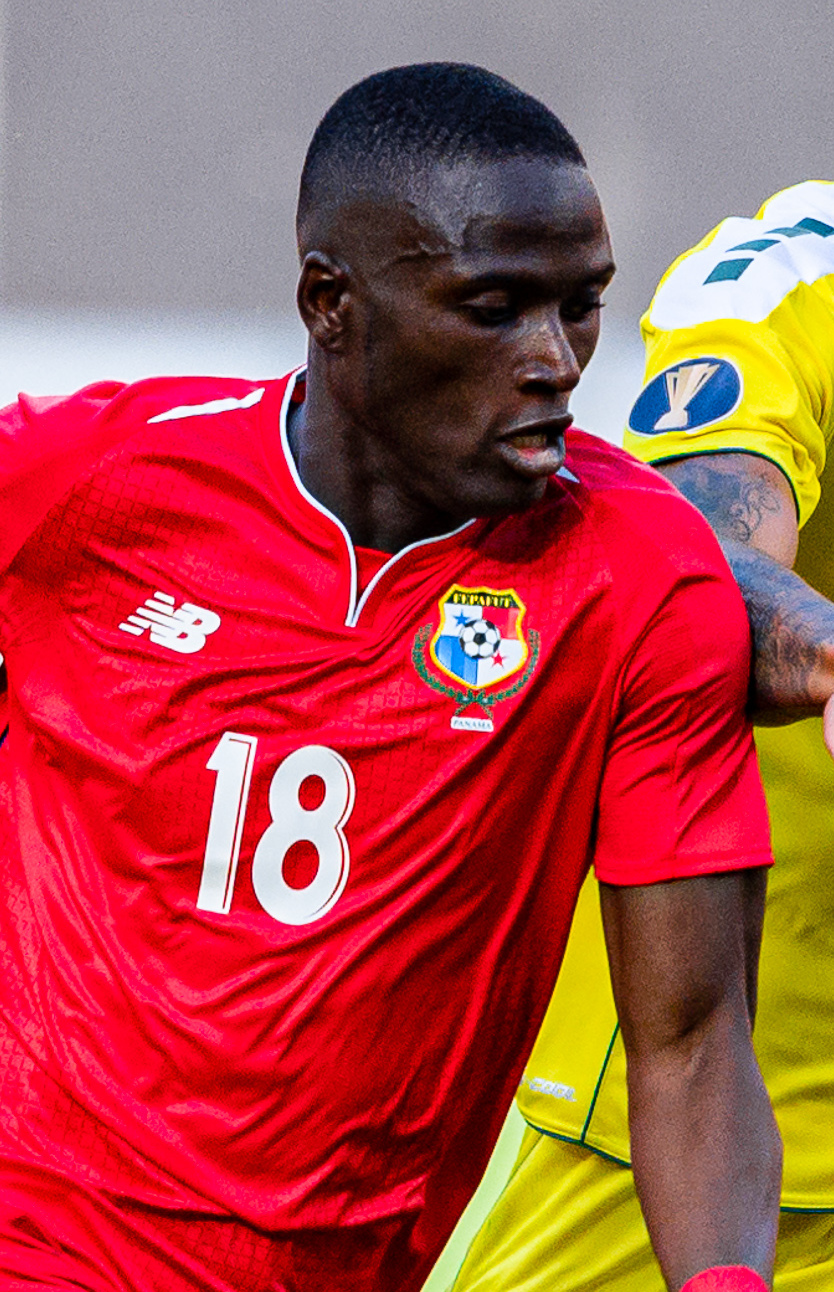
- Arroyo with Panama at the 2019 CONCACAF Gold Cup

Personal information
- Full name: Abdiel Arroyo Molinar
- Date of birth: 13 December 1993 (age 32)
- Place of birth: Colón, Panama
- Height: 1.83 m (6 ft 0 in)
- Positions: Forward; winger

Team information
- Current team: UTC
- Number: 11

Youth career
- Árabe Unido

Senior career*
Years	Team	Apps	(Gls)
2011–2015	Árabe Unido	114	(28)
2016	RNK Split	14	(0)
2016	Deportes Tolima	16	(1)
2017–2018	Danubio	21	(5)
2018	Alajuelense	11	(3)
2018–2020	Árabe Unido	18	(8)
2018–2019	→ Santa Clara (loan)	5	(0)
2019–2020	→ Newcastle Jets (loan)	17	(2)
2020–2021	Maccabi Petah Tikva	23	(0)
2021	Árabe Unido	11	(3)
2022	Universidad César Vallejo	22	(2)
2023	Monagas S.C.	23	(1)
2024	Albion F.C.	19	(4)
2025	Always Ready	0	(0)
2025	ABB	11	(2)
2026–	UTC	1	(0)

International career^{‡}
2014–2019	Panama	49	(7)
- * Club domestic league appearances and goals as of 1 June 2021 ‡ National team caps and goals as of 22 June 2020

Abdiel Arroyo Molinar (born 13 December 1993) is a Panamanian professional footballer who plays as a forward or winger for UTC and the Panama national team.

== Club career ==
In summer 2015, Arroyo caught the eye of Honduran side Marathón and Peruvian outfit César Vallejo after a good showing at the Gold Cup.

== International career ==
A speedy striker, Arroyo made his debut for Panama in an August 2014 friendly match against Peru and has as of 14 June 2016, earned a total of 17 caps, scoring one goal.

He was called up to the Panama team for the 2015 CONCACAF Gold Cup; he played in Panama's opening game.

In May 2018, he was named in Panama's 23-man squad for the 2018 FIFA World Cup in Russia.

== Career statistics ==
=== International ===
As of 22 June 2019

Panama
Year	Apps	Goals
2014	2	0
2015	8	0
2016	9	2
2017	13	3
2018	7	1
2019	6	1
Total	45	7

=== International goals ===
Scores and results list Panama's goal tally first.

No.	Date	Venue	Opponent	Score	Result	Competition	Ref.
1.	14 June 2016	Lincoln Financial Field, Philadelphia, United States	Chile	2–3	2–4	Copa América Centenario	
2.	2 September 2016	Estadio Rommel Fernández, Panama City, Panama	Jamaica	2–0	2–0	2018 FIFA World Cup qualification	
3.	20 January 2017	Estadio Rommel Fernández, Panama City, Panama	El Salvador	1–0	1–0	2017 Copa Centroamericana	
4.	15 July 2017	FirstEnergy Stadium, Cleveland, United States	Martinique	2–0	3–0	2017 CONCACAF Gold Cup	
5.	5 September 2017	Estadio Rommel Fernández, Panama City, Panama	Trinidad and Tobago	3–0	3–0	2018 FIFA World Cup qualification	
6.	16 October 2018	Cheonan Stadium, Cheonan, South Korea	South Korea	1–2	2–2	Friendly	
7.	22 June 2019	FirstEnergy Stadium, Cleveland, United States	Guyana	1–0	4–2	2019 CONCACAF Gold Cup	

== Honours ==
Panama

- CONCACAF Gold Cup third place: 2015
