= Darren Mattocks =

Jamaican footballer (born 1990)

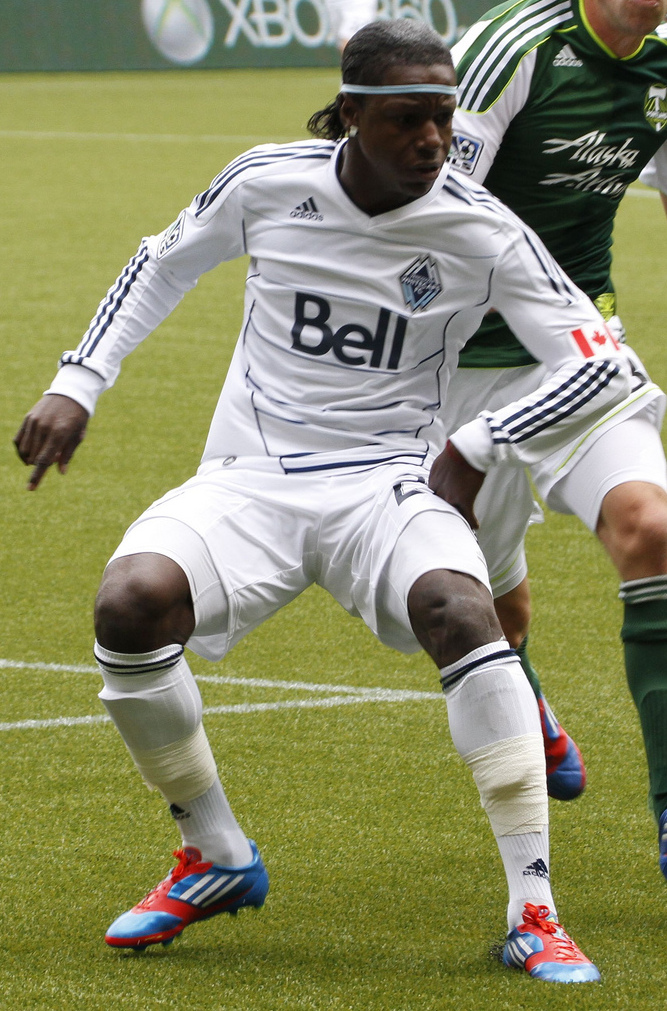
- Mattocks with Vancouver Whitecaps Reserves in 2012

Personal information
- Full name: Darren Dimitri Mattocks
- Date of birth: 2 September 1990 (age 36)
- Place of birth: Portmore, Jamaica
- Height: 5 ft 10 in (1.78 m)
- Position: Forward

College career
Years	Team	Apps	(Gls)
2010–2011	Akron Zips	47	(39)

Senior career*
Years	Team	Apps	(Gls)
2012–2016	Vancouver Whitecaps FC	93	(19)
2016–2017	Portland Timbers	43	(5)
2018	D.C. United	25	(10)
2019	FC Cincinnati	21	(3)
2021	Al-Merrikh	5	(0)
2021	Phoenix Rising	10	(5)

International career^{‡}
2012–2019	Jamaica	50	(18)
Medal record
Men's football
Representing Jamaica
CONCACAF Gold Cup
Runner-up	2015 United States–Canada	Team
Runner-up	2017 United States	Team
- * Club domestic league appearances and goals as of 11:27, 9 November 2021 (UTC) ‡ National team caps and goals as of 14:37, 23 February 2021 (UTC)

Darren Dimitri Mattocks (born 2 September 1990) is a Jamaican professional footballer who last played as a forward for Phoenix Rising FC and the Jamaica national football team.

After two seasons of college soccer at the University of Akron, Mattocks was selected second overall by Vancouver Whitecaps FC in the 2012 MLS SuperDraft. He played in Major League Soccer (MLS) for Vancouver, the Portland Timbers, D.C. United and FC Cincinnati, then joined Sudanese club Al-Merrikh and Phoenix Rising in 2021. With Jamaica, he was joint top scorer at the 2014 Caribbean Cup, which Jamaica won, and scored in both the semi-final and the final of the 2015 CONCACAF Gold Cup.

== College career ==
Mattocks played for the University of Akron where he made 47 appearances and scored 39 goals over two years. He was nominated for several awards there, including first-year All-American teams named by several media outlets.

== Professional career ==
=== Vancouver Whitecaps FC ===
Mattocks was selected by Vancouver Whitecaps FC with the second overall pick in the 2012 MLS SuperDraft.

He made his club debut as a substitute on opening day, 10 March, against the Montreal Impact. On 18 March he was taken to hospital with severe burns to his upper right arm and shoulder from an accident while cooking dinner, and he could not train properly during his recovery. He returned to the line-up on 9 May against FC Edmonton, scoring his first goal for the Whitecaps in the 93rd minute.

Mattocks scored his first MLS goal on 26 May 2012 against the Portland Timbers. Mattocks scored six goals in his first nine MLS appearances in 2012. In the Whitecaps' first MLS playoff game, against the LA Galaxy, Mattocks scored the club's first playoff goal in the fourth minute. He earned the team's Golden Boot award that year with seven goals, and MLS listed him as the best young player in the league in its 2012 "24 under 24" list. For the 2013 season, MLS listed Mattocks at no. 12 on its annual "24 under 24" list of best young players.

=== Portland Timbers ===
In March 2016, Mattocks was traded to the Portland Timbers in exchange for targeted allocation money and general allocation money.

=== D.C. United ===
After Portland declined his contract option, Mattocks was traded to D.C. United on 10 December 2017 in exchange for an international roster slot. D.C. United exercised Mattocks' option for 2018, but he lost his starting role after Wayne Rooney arrived as a Designated Player midway through the season.

On 11 March 2018, Mattocks scored his first goal for D.C. United, the club's only goal in a 3–1 loss to Atlanta United. In his time with D.C. United, he appeared in 25 games and scored 10 goals.

=== FC Cincinnati ===
In December 2018, Mattocks was drafted by FC Cincinnati in the 2018 MLS Expansion Draft.

=== Al-Merrikh ===
After nearly a year without a club, Mattocks joined Sudan Premier League side Al-Merrikh in February 2021, ahead of their CAF Champions League campaign.

=== Phoenix Rising FC ===
Mattocks signed with Phoenix Rising FC of the USL Championship on 18 August 2021.

== International career ==
Mattocks made his international debut for Jamaica in 2012, coming on in the 55th minute in a 2–0 win over El Salvador. He scored three times at the 2014 Caribbean Cup, finishing as the tournament's joint top scorer with Kervens Belfort and Kevin Molino, as Jamaica won it for the sixth time.

In 2015, Mattocks was included in Jamaica's squads for the Copa América and CONCACAF Gold Cup tournaments. On 22 July 2015, Mattocks scored the opening goal in the 2–1 semi-final victory over the United States in Atlanta, Georgia, as the Reggae Boyz reached their first Gold Cup final. He also scored in the 3–1 defeat to Mexico in the final in Philadelphia.

== Personal life ==
Mattocks received his U.S. green card in May 2014, which qualified him as a domestic player for MLS roster purposes.

== Career statistics ==
=== Club ===
As of 20 August 2018

Club	Season	League		League Cup		Domestic Cup		CONCACAF		Total	
Club	Season	Apps	Goals	Apps	Goals	Apps	Goals	Apps	Goals	Apps	Goals
Vancouver Whitecaps	2012	21	7	1	1	3	1	0	0	25	9
Vancouver Whitecaps	2013	20	3	0	0	4	0	0	0	24	3
Vancouver Whitecaps	2014	30	6	0	0	0	0	0	0	30	6
Vancouver Whitecaps	2015	22	3	2	0	4	1	3	0	31	4
Vancouver Whitecaps	Total	93	19	3	1	11	2	3	0	110	22
Portland Timbers	2016	19	1	0	0	2	0	0	0	21	1
Portland Timbers	2017	24	4	2	0	0	0	0	0	26	2
Portland Timbers	Total	43	5	2	0	2	0	0	0	47	5
D.C. United	2018	20	9	0	0	0	0	0	0	20	9
Career total		158	34	5	1	13	2	3	0	179	36

=== International goals ===
Score and result list Jamaica's goal tally first.

#	Date	Venue	Opponent	Score	Result	Competition
1.	2 March 2014	Barbados National Stadium, Saint Michael, Barbados	Barbados	1–0	2–0	Friendly
2.	5 March 2014	Beausejour Stadium, Gros Islet, Saint Lucia	Saint Lucia	2–0	5–0	Friendly
3.	5 March 2014	Beausejour Stadium, Gros Islet, Saint Lucia	Saint Lucia	4–0	5–0	Friendly
4.	12 November 2014	Montego Bay Sports Complex, Montego Bay, Jamaica	Martinique	1–0	1–1	2014 Caribbean Cup
5.	14 November 2014	Montego Bay Sports Complex, Montego Bay, Jamaica	Antigua and Barbuda	2–0	3–0	2014 Caribbean Cup
6.	16 November 2014	Montego Bay Sports Complex, Montego Bay, Jamaica	Haiti	2–0	2–0	2014 Caribbean Cup
7.	27 March 2015	Montego Bay Sports Complex, Montego Bay, Jamaica	Venezuela	2–1	2–1	Friendly
8.	31 March 2015	Montego Bay Sports Complex, Montego Bay, Jamaica	Cuba	3–0	3–0	Friendly
9.	23 July 2015	Georgia Dome, Atlanta, United States	United States	1–0	2–1	2015 CONCACAF Gold Cup
10.	26 July 2015	Lincoln Financial Field, Philadelphia, United States	Mexico	1–3	1–3	2015 CONCACAF Gold Cup Final
11.	5 September 2015	Independence Park, Kingston, Jamaica	Nicaragua	2–3	2–3	2018 FIFA World Cup qualification
12.	8 September 2015	Dennis Martínez National Stadium, Managua, Nicaragua	Nicaragua	1–0	2–0	2018 FIFA World Cup qualification
13.	9 July 2017	Qualcomm Stadium, San Diego, United States	Curaçao	2–0	2–0	2017 CONCACAF Gold Cup
14.	16 July 2017	Alamodome, San Antonio, United States	El Salvador	1–1	1–1	2017 CONCACAF Gold Cup
15.	9 September 2018	Independence Park, Kingston, Jamaica	Cayman Islands	1–0	4–0	2019–20 CONCACAF Nations League qualification
16.	9 September 2018	Independence Park, Kingston, Jamaica	Cayman Islands	3–0	4–0	2019–20 CONCACAF Nations League qualification
17.	17 November 2018	Montego Bay Sports Complex, Montego Bay, Jamaica	Suriname	2–0	2–1	2019–20 CONCACAF Nations League qualification
18.	30 June 2019	Lincoln Financial Field, Philadelphia, United States	Panama	1–0	1–0	2019 CONCACAF Gold Cup
