= 2015 CONCACAF Gold Cup =

13th edition of the CONCACAF Gold Cup

Coupe d'Or CONCACAF 2015

Tournament details
- Host countries: Canada; United States
- Dates: July 7–26
- Teams: 12 (from 1 confederation)
- Venues: 14 (in 14 host cities)

Final positions
- Champions: Mexico (7th title)
- Runners-up: Jamaica
- Third place: Panama
- Fourth place: United States

Tournament statistics
- Matches played: 26
- Goals scored: 62 (2.38 per match)
- Attendance: 1,090,396 (41,938 per match)
- Top scorer(s): (United States) Clint Dempsey (7 goals)
- Best player: (Mexico) Andrés Guardado
- Best young player: (Mexico) Jesús Corona
- Best goalkeeper: (United States) Brad Guzan
- Fair play award: Jamaica

The 2015 CONCACAF Gold Cup was the 13th edition of the CONCACAF Gold Cup competition and the 23rd CONCACAF regional championship overall in the organization's fifty-four years of existence. It was held in the United States, with two matches being played in Canada, marking the first time the CONCACAF Gold Cup was played in that country.

Mexico won the competition after surviving both the quarter-finals and semi-finals in controversial circumstances, defeating Jamaica—the first Caribbean nation to reach such a stage—in the final. Of the co-hosts, Canada was eliminated in the group stage, while the United States, the defending champions, lost in the semi-finals to Jamaica. The competition included a third place match for the first time since 2003, in which Panama defeated the United States.

== Venues ==
A total of 14 venues were used for the tournament. CONCACAF announced the host cities and venues for the tournament on December 16, 2014. Apart from Lincoln Financial Field in Philadelphia which hosted the final and PPL Park in Chester which hosted the third place match (both located in the Philadelphia metropolitan area), the other 12 venues hosted two matches. The assignment of matches for the knockout round and the awarding of the final were announced on March 12, 2015.

| East Rutherford | Charlotte | Atlanta | Baltimore | Philadelphia |
|---|---|---|---|---|
| MetLife Stadium | Bank of America Stadium | Georgia Dome | M&T Bank Stadium | Lincoln Financial Field |
| Capacity: 82,566 | Capacity: 74,455 | Capacity: 74,228 | Capacity: 71,008 | Capacity: 69,176 |
| Foxborough | Location of the host cities of the 2015 CONCACAF Gold Cup. | | | Chicago |
| Gillette Stadium | Location of the host cities of the 2015 CONCACAF Gold Cup. | | | Soldier Field |
| Capacity: 68,756 | Location of the host cities of the 2015 CONCACAF Gold Cup. | | | Capacity: 63,500 |
| Glendale | Location of the host cities of the 2015 CONCACAF Gold Cup. | | | Carson |
| University of Phoenix Stadium | Location of the host cities of the 2015 CONCACAF Gold Cup. | | | StubHub Center |
| Capacity: 63,400 | Location of the host cities of the 2015 CONCACAF Gold Cup. | | | Capacity: 30,510 |
| Houston | Toronto | Frisco | Chester | Kansas City |
| BBVA Compass Stadium | BMO Field | Toyota Stadium | PPL Park | Sporting Park |
| Capacity: 22,039 | Capacity: 30,991 | Capacity: 20,500 | Capacity: 18,500 | Capacity: 18,467 |

== Teams ==
=== Qualification ===
A total of twelve teams qualified for the tournament. Three berths were allocated to North America, four to Central America, and four to the Caribbean. For the first time, the two overall fifth-placed teams of the Caribbean zone and the Central American zone competed for the final berth of the CONCACAF Gold Cup. Previously, five berths were allocated to Central America and four were allocated to the Caribbean.

| Team | Qualification | Appearances | Last appearance | Previous best performance | FIFA Ranking |
North American zone
| United States (TH) | Automatic | 13th | 2013 | Champions (**1991**, **2002**, **2005**, **2007**, **2013**) | 27 |
| Mexico | Automatic | 13th | 2013 | Champions (**1993**, 1996, 1998, **2003**, 2009, 2011) | 23 |
| Canada | Automatic | 12th | 2013 | Champions (2000) | 109 |
Central American zone qualified through the 2014 Copa Centroamericana
| Costa Rica | Winners | 12th | 2013 | Runners-up (2002) | 14 |
| Guatemala | Runners-up | 10th | 2011 | Fourth place (1996) | 93 |
| Panama | Third place | 7th | 2013 | Runners-up (2005, 2013) | 54 |
| El Salvador | Fourth place | 9th | 2013 | Quarter-finals (2002, 2003, 2011, 2013) | 89 |
Caribbean zone qualified through the 2014 Caribbean Cup
| Jamaica | Winners | 9th | 2011 | Third place (1993) | 65 |
| Trinidad and Tobago | Runners-up | 9th | 2013 | Third place (2000) | 67 |
| Haiti | Third place | 6th | 2013 | Quarter-finals (2002, 2009) | 76 |
| Cuba | Fourth place | 8th | 2013 | Quarter-finals (2003, 2013) | 107 |
Play-off winner between Caribbean zone fifth place and Central American zone fifth place
| Honduras | Play-off | 12th | 2013 | Runners-up (1991) | 75 |

Bold indicates that the corresponding team was hosting the event.

=== Squads ===
An initial provisional list of 35 players had to be submitted to CONCACAF before June 7, 2015. A final list containing 23 players was to have been submitted for June 27, 2015. Three of the players named in the final list had to be goalkeepers. The players named in the final list had to wear shirts numbered 1 to 23, with number 1 reserved for a goalkeeper.

Teams qualifying for the quarter-final stage were permitted to replace up to six players. The replacements had to have been named on the provisional list and would be given a shirt numbered between 24 and 29.

An injured player from the final list could be replaced by another from provisional list 24 hours before his national team's first game.

=== Draw ===
The seeded teams which headed up each group was announced on December 16, 2014: United States (Group A), Costa Rica (Group B), and Mexico (Group C). Seeded teams were determined based on November 27, 2014 FIFA rankings (shown in brackets).

| Seeded | Unseeded | | |
|---|---|---|---|
| Costa Rica (16); Mexico (20); United States (28) | Trinidad and Tobago (54); Panama (56); Haiti (68) | Jamaica (71); Honduras (72); Guatemala (73) | Cuba (79); El Salvador (93); Canada (110) |

The composition of the groups and the schedule of the tournament were announced by CONCACAF on March 12, 2015.

== Match officials ==
Referees

- (Canada) David Gantar
- (Costa Rica) Henry Bejarano
- (Costa Rica) Ricardo Montero
- (Costa Rica) Wálter Quesada
- (Cuba) Yadel Martínez
- (El Salvador) Joel Aguilar
- (El Salvador) Elmer Bonilla
- (El Salvador) Marlon Mejía
- (Guatemala) Walter López
- (Honduras) Armando Castro
- (Honduras) Óscar Moncada
- (Honduras) Héctor Rodríguez
- (Mexico) Roberto García
- (Mexico) Fernando Guerrero
- (Mexico) César Ramos
- (Panama) John Pitti
- (United States) Mark Geiger
- (United States) Jair Marrufo

Assistant referees

- (Canada) Daniel Belleau
- (Canada) Philippe Brière
- (Costa Rica) Warner Castro
- (Costa Rica) Octavio Jara
- (Costa Rica) Leonel Leal
- (Cuba) Hiran Dopico
- (El Salvador) William Torres
- (El Salvador) Juan Zumba
- (Guatemala) Hermenerito Leal
- (Guatemala) Gersón López
- (Honduras) Cristian Ramírez
- (Jamaica) Ricardo Morgan
- (Jamaica) Garnet Page
- (Mexico) José Luis Camargo
- (Mexico) Alberto Morín
- (Panama) Daniel Williamson
- (United States) Eric Boria
- (United States) Peter Manikowski
- (United States) CJ Morgante

== Group stage ==
The top two teams from each group and the two best third-placed teams qualified for the quarter-finals. All match times listed are in Eastern Daylight Time (EDT).

=== Tiebreakers ===
The ranking of each team in each group was determined as follows:

1. Greatest number of points obtained in group matches
2. Goal difference in all group matches
3. Greatest number of goals scored in all group matches
4. Greatest number of points obtained in group matches between the teams concerned;
5. Drawing of lots by the Gold Cup Committee.

=== Group A ===
| Pos | Team | Pld | W | D | L | GF | GA | GD | Pts | Qualification |
|---|---|---|---|---|---|---|---|---|---|---|
| 1 | United States (H) | 3 | 2 | 1 | 0 | 4 | 2 | +2 | 7 | Advance to knockout stage |
| 2 | Haiti | 3 | 1 | 1 | 1 | 2 | 2 | 0 | 4 | Advance to knockout stage |
| 3 | Panama | 3 | 0 | 3 | 0 | 3 | 3 | 0 | 3 | Advance to knockout stage |
| 4 | Honduras | 3 | 0 | 1 | 2 | 2 | 4 | −2 | 1 | |

Source: CONCACAF
(H) Hosts
July 7, 2015
19:00 (18:00 CDT)

| Panama | 1–1 | Haiti |
|---|---|---|
| Quintero 56' | Report | Nazon 86' |

Toyota Stadium, Frisco
Attendance: 22,357
Referee: Henry Bejarano (Costa Rica)
July 7, 2015
21:30 (20:30 CDT)

| United States | 2–1 | Honduras |
|---|---|---|
| Dempsey 25', 64' | Report | Discua 69' |

Toyota Stadium, Frisco
Attendance: 22,357
Referee: César Ramos (Mexico)

July 10, 2015
18:00

| Honduras | 1–1 | Panama |
|---|---|---|
| Najar 82' | Report | Tejada 21' |

Gillette Stadium, Foxborough
Attendance: 46,720
Referee: Marlon Mejía (El Salvador)
July 10, 2015
20:30

| United States | 1–0 | Haiti |
|---|---|---|
| Dempsey 47' | Report |

Gillette Stadium, Foxborough
Attendance: 46,720
Referee: Ricardo Montero (Costa Rica)

July 13, 2015
19:00 (18:00 CDT)

| Haiti | 1–0 | Honduras |
|---|---|---|
| Nazon 14' | Report |

Sporting Park, Kansas City
Attendance: 18,467
Referee: Joel Aguilar (El Salvador)
July 13, 2015
21:30 (20:30 CDT)

| Panama | 1–1 | United States |
|---|---|---|
| Pérez 34' | Report | Bradley 55' |

Sporting Park, Kansas City
Attendance: 18,467
Referee: Roberto García (Mexico)

=== Group B ===
| Pos | Team | Pld | W | D | L | GF | GA | GD | Pts | Qualification |
|---|---|---|---|---|---|---|---|---|---|---|
| 1 | Jamaica | 3 | 2 | 1 | 0 | 4 | 2 | +2 | 7 | Advance to knockout stage |
| 2 | Costa Rica | 3 | 0 | 3 | 0 | 3 | 3 | 0 | 3 | Advance to knockout stage |
| 3 | El Salvador | 3 | 0 | 2 | 1 | 1 | 2 | −1 | 2 | |
| 4 | Canada (H) | 3 | 0 | 2 | 1 | 0 | 1 | −1 | 2 | |

Source: CONCACAF
(H) Hosts
July 8, 2015
20:00 (17:00 PDT)

| Costa Rica | 2–2 | Jamaica |
|---|---|---|
| Miller 33'; Ramírez 37' | Report | McCleary 13'; McAnuff 48' |

StubHub Center, Carson
Attendance: 22,648
Referee: Fernando Guerrero (Mexico)
July 8, 2015
22:30 (19:30 PDT)

| El Salvador | 0–0 | Canada |
|---|---|---|
| | Report |

StubHub Center, Carson
Attendance: 22,648
Referee: Óscar Moncada (Honduras)

July 11, 2015
18:30 (17:30 CDT)

| Jamaica | 1–0 | Canada |
|---|---|---|
| Austin 90+2' | Report |

BBVA Compass Stadium, Houston
Attendance: 22,017
Referee: Yadel Martínez (Cuba)
July 11, 2015
21:00 (20:00 CDT)

| Costa Rica | 1–1 | El Salvador |
|---|---|---|
| Ruiz 61' | Report | Corea 90+2' |

BBVA Compass Stadium, Houston
Attendance: 22,017
Referee: Jair Marrufo (United States)

July 14, 2015
18:00

| Jamaica | 1–0 | El Salvador |
|---|---|---|
| McCleary 72' | Report |

BMO Field, Toronto
Attendance: 16,674
Referee: Walter López (Guatemala)
July 14, 2015
20:30

| Canada | 0–0 | Costa Rica |
|---|---|---|
| | Report |

BMO Field, Toronto
Attendance: 16,674
Referee: Héctor Rodríguez (Honduras)

=== Group C ===
| Pos | Team | Pld | W | D | L | GF | GA | GD | Pts | Qualification |
|---|---|---|---|---|---|---|---|---|---|---|
| 1 | Trinidad and Tobago | 3 | 2 | 1 | 0 | 9 | 5 | +4 | 7 | Advance to knockout stage |
| 2 | Mexico | 3 | 1 | 2 | 0 | 10 | 4 | +6 | 5 | Advance to knockout stage |
| 3 | Cuba | 3 | 1 | 0 | 2 | 1 | 8 | −7 | 3 | Advance to knockout stage |
| 4 | Guatemala | 3 | 0 | 1 | 2 | 1 | 4 | −3 | 1 | |

Source: CONCACAF
July 9, 2015
19:00 (18:00 CDT)

| Trinidad and Tobago | 3–1 | Guatemala |
|---|---|---|
| Bateau 11'; Cato 14'; J. Jones 25' | Report | Ruiz 62' |

Soldier Field, Chicago
Attendance: 54,126
Referee: John Pitti (Panama)
July 9, 2015
21:30 (20:30 CDT)

| Mexico | 6–0 | Cuba |
|---|---|---|
| Peralta 17', 37', 62'; Vela 23'; Guardado 44'; G. dos Santos 75' | Report |

Soldier Field, Chicago
Attendance: 54,126
Referee: Wálter Quesada (Costa Rica)

July 12, 2015
18:30 (16:30 MST)

| Trinidad and Tobago | 2–0 | Cuba |
|---|---|---|
| Bateau 17'; Boucaud 42' | Report |

University of Phoenix Stadium, Glendale
Attendance: 62,910
Referee: David Gantar (Canada)
July 12, 2015
21:00 (19:00 MST)

| Guatemala | 0–0 | Mexico |
|---|---|---|
| | Report |

University of Phoenix Stadium, Glendale
Attendance: 62,910
Referee: Armando Castro (Honduras)

July 15, 2015
18:00

| Cuba | 1–0 | Guatemala |
|---|---|---|
| Reyes 73' | Report |

Bank of America Stadium, Charlotte
Attendance: 55,823
Referee: Elmer Bonilla (El Salvador)
July 15, 2015
20:30

| Mexico | 4–4 | Trinidad and Tobago |
|---|---|---|
| Aguilar 32'; Vela 51'; Guardado 88'; K. Jones 90+1' (o.g.) | Report | Cummings 55', 67'; K. Jones 58'; Marshall 90+3' |

Bank of America Stadium, Charlotte
Attendance: 55,823
Referee: Mark Geiger (United States)

=== Ranking of third-placed teams ===
| Pos | Grp | Team | Pld | W | D | L | GF | GA | GD | Pts | Qualification |
|---|---|---|---|---|---|---|---|---|---|---|---|
| 1 | A | Panama | 3 | 0 | 3 | 0 | 3 | 3 | 0 | 3 | Advance to knockout stage |
| 2 | C | Cuba | 3 | 1 | 0 | 2 | 1 | 8 | −7 | 3 | Advance to knockout stage |
| 3 | B | El Salvador | 3 | 0 | 2 | 1 | 1 | 2 | −1 | 2 | |

Source: CONCACAF
Rules for classification: 1) points; 2) goal difference; 3) number of goals scored; 4) drawing of lots

== Knockout stage ==
=== Bracket ===
Quarter-finals
July 18 – Baltimore
United States | 6
Cuba | 0
July 18 – Baltimore
Haiti | 0
Jamaica | 1
July 19 – East Rutherford
Trinidad and Tobago | 1 (5)
Panama (p) | 1 (6)
July 19 – East Rutherford
Mexico (a.e.t.) | 1
Costa Rica | 0

Semi-finals
July 22 – Atlanta
United States | 1
Jamaica | 2
July 22 – Atlanta
Panama | 1
Mexico (a.e.t.) | 2

Final
July 26 – Philadelphia
Jamaica | 1
Mexico | 3
Third place play-off
July 25 – Chester
United States | 1 (2)
Panama (p) | 1 (3)

=== Quarter-finals ===
July 18, 2015
17:00

| United States | 6–0 | Cuba |
|---|---|---|
| Dempsey 4', 64' (pen.), 78'; Zardes 15'; Jóhannsson 32'; Gonzalez 45' | Report |

M&T Bank Stadium, Baltimore
Attendance: 37,994
Referee: Henry Bejarano (Costa Rica)

July 18, 2015
20:00

| Haiti | 0–1 | Jamaica |
|---|---|---|
| | Report | Barnes 7' |

M&T Bank Stadium, Baltimore
Attendance: 37,994
Referee: César Ramos (Mexico)

July 19, 2015
16:30

| Trinidad and Tobago | 1–1 (a.e.t.) | Panama |
|---|---|---|
| K. Jones 54' | Report | Tejada 37' |
Penalties
| Guerra (penalty scored); Bateau (penalty missed); J. Jones (penalty missed); Williams (penalty scored); K. Jones (penalty scored); Abu Bakr (penalty scored); Cyrus (penalty missed); Boucaud (penalty scored); Peltier (penalty missed) | 5–6 | (penalty missed) R. Torres; (penalty scored) G. Torres; (penalty missed) Davis; (penalty scored) Arroyo; (penalty scored) Cooper; (penalty scored) Cummings; (penalty missed) Quintero; (penalty scored) Pérez; (penalty scored) Pimentel |

MetLife Stadium, East Rutherford
Attendance: 74,187
Referee: Héctor Rodríguez (Honduras)

July 19, 2015
19:30

| Mexico | 1–0 (a.e.t.) | Costa Rica |
|---|---|---|
| Guardado 120+4' (pen.) | Report |

MetLife Stadium, East Rutherford
Attendance: 74,187
Referee: Walter López (Guatemala)

=== Semi-finals ===
July 22, 2015
18:00

| United States | 1–2 | Jamaica |
|---|---|---|
| Bradley 48' | Report | Mattocks 31'; Barnes 36' |

Georgia Dome, Atlanta
Attendance: 70,511
Referee: Ricardo Montero (Costa Rica)

July 22, 2015
21:00

| Panama | 1–2 (a.e.t.) | Mexico |
|---|---|---|
| R. Torres 57' | Report | Guardado 90+10' (pen.), 105+1' (pen.) |

Georgia Dome, Atlanta
Attendance: 70,511
Referee: Mark Geiger (United States)

=== Third place play-off ===
July 25, 2015
16:00

| United States | 1–1 (a.e.t.) | Panama |
|---|---|---|
| Dempsey 70' | Report | Nurse 55' |
Penalties
| Jóhannsson (penalty scored); Dempsey (penalty scored); Johnson (penalty missed); Bradley (penalty missed); Beasley (penalty missed) | 2–3 | (penalty scored) R. Torres; (penalty scored) Arroyo; (penalty missed) Cooper; (penalty scored) Cummings |

PPL Park, Chester
Attendance: 12,598
Referee: Óscar Moncada (Honduras)

=== Final ===
July 26, 2015
20:00 EDT (UTC−4) (Note: The kickoff time was delayed by 30 minutes.)

| Jamaica | 1–3 | Mexico |
|---|---|---|
| Mattocks 79' | Report | Guardado 31'; Corona 46'; Peralta 61' |

Lincoln Financial Field, Philadelphia
Attendance: 68,930
Referee: Joel Aguilar (El Salvador)

== Statistics ==
=== Goalscorers ===
There were 62 goals scored in 26 matches, for an average of 2.38 goals per match.

7 goals

- (United States) Clint Dempsey

6 goals

- (Mexico) Andrés Guardado

4 goals

- (Mexico) Oribe Peralta

2 goals

- (Haiti) Duckens Nazon
- (Jamaica) Darren Mattocks
- (Jamaica) Giles Barnes
- (Jamaica) Garath McCleary
- (Mexico) Carlos Vela
- (Panama) Luis Tejada
- (Trinidad and Tobago) Sheldon Bateau
- (Trinidad and Tobago) Keron Cummings
- (Trinidad and Tobago) Kenwyne Jones
- (United States) Michael Bradley

1 goal

- (Costa Rica) Roy Miller
- (Costa Rica) David Ramírez
- (Costa Rica) Bryan Ruiz
- (Cuba) Maikel Reyes
- (El Salvador) Dustin Corea
- (Guatemala) Carlos Ruiz
- (Honduras) Carlos Discua
- (Honduras) Andy Najar
- (Jamaica) Rodolph Austin
- (Jamaica) Jobi McAnuff
- (Mexico) Giovani dos Santos
- (Mexico) Jesús Corona
- (Mexico) Paul Aguilar
- (Panama) Roberto Nurse
- (Panama) Blas Pérez
- (Panama) Alberto Quintero
- (Panama) Román Torres
- (Trinidad and Tobago) Andre Boucaud
- (Trinidad and Tobago) Cordell Cato
- (Trinidad and Tobago) Joevin Jones
- (Trinidad and Tobago) Yohance Marshall
- (United States) Omar Gonzalez
- (United States) Aron Jóhannsson
- (United States) Gyasi Zardes

1 own goal

- (Trinidad and Tobago) Kenwyne Jones (against Mexico)

== Awards ==
The following Gold Cup awards were given at the conclusion of the tournament: the Golden Boot (top scorer), Golden Ball (best overall player) and Golden Glove (best goalkeeper).

Golden Ball
(Mexico) Andrés Guardado
Golden Boot
(United States) Clint Dempsey
7 goals
Golden Glove
(United States) Brad Guzan
Young Player Award
(Mexico) Jesús Corona
Fair Play Trophy
Jamaica

=== Team of the Tournament ===
The following team was selected as the Team of the Tournament by Bleacher Report:

| Goalkeeper | Defenders | Midfielders | Forwards |
|---|---|---|---|
| (United States) Brad Guzan | (Jamaica) Kemar Lawrence (Panama) Román Torres (Trinidad and Tobago) Sheldon Bateau (Mexico) Paul Aguilar | (Mexico) Andrés Guardado (Mexico) Jonathan dos Santos (Jamaica) Rodolph Austin (Jamaica) Garath McCleary | (United States) Clint Dempsey (Trinidad and Tobago) Kenwyne Jones |

=== Prize money ===
The total amount of prize money offered by CONCACAF for the tournament was US$2.75 million, with $1 million being the top prize. Listed below is a breakdown of how the total amount was distributed:

- $100k – To each team eliminated in the group stage (4 teams)
- $125k – To each team eliminated in the quarter-finals (4 teams)
- $150k – Fourth placed team
- $200k – Third placed team
- $500k – Runners-up
- $1 mil – Winners

== Qualification for international tournaments ==
The 2015 CONCACAF Gold Cup was used for qualification for the 2017 FIFA Confederations Cup, played in Russia, and the Copa América Centenario, played in the United States in 2016.

=== FIFA Confederations Cup ===
As winners of the 2015 Gold Cup, Mexico qualified for a one-off play-off match against the United States, the winners of the 2013 Gold Cup, to decide which team would represent CONCACAF at the 2017 FIFA Confederations Cup. Mexico won the match 3–2 after extra time.

=== Copa América Centenario ===
In addition, Panama, Trinidad and Tobago, Haiti, and Cuba, being the top four teams in the tournament not already qualified, qualified for the play-offs which determined the remaining two teams to participate in the Copa América Centenario in 2016. The United States, Mexico, Costa Rica (winners of the 2014 Copa Centroamericana), and Jamaica (winners of the 2014 Caribbean Cup) had already qualified before the tournament, with Panama and Haiti rounding out the six representatives CONCACAF sent to the Copa América following their play-off victories over Cuba and Trinidad and Tobago, respectively.

== Marketing ==
=== Broadcasting rights ===
Multiple officials of Traffic Sports were identified in the 2015 FIFA corruption case, which alleged that bribes related to the 2015 Gold Cup amounted to two-thirds of the cost of staging the tournament.

Worldwide TV broadcasting rights

| Country/Region | Broadcaster | Notes |
|---|---|---|
| Australia | Setanta Sports | |
| Azerbaijan | ESPN Azerbaijan | |
| Brazil | SporTV | |
| Canada | Sportsnet World, Sportsnet 360, Univision Canada | Simsub via Fox |
| China | LeTV | |
| Costa Rica | Repretel, Teletica | |
| El Salvador | Telecorporacion Salvadoreña | |
| France | Ma Chaîne Sport (MCS) | |
| Guatemala | Canal 3 and Canal 7 | |
| Honduras | Televicentro | |
| Hong Kong | iCable | |
| Indonesia | Orange TV | |
| Latin America | Gol TV | |
| Malaysia | Astro | |
| Mexico | Televisa, TV Azteca | |
| Middle East and North Africa | Abu Dhabi Sports Channel | |
| Netherlands | Fox Sports | |
| Panama | TV Nacional de Panamá, Medcom | |
| Portugal | Sport TV | |
| Singapore | Starhub | |
| Spain | beIN Sports, Mediapro | |
| Sub-Saharan Africa | Supersport | |
| Taiwan | Sportcast | |
| Thailand | Grammy | |
| United Kingdom; Republic of Ireland | BT Sport, Bet365 (online streaming) | |
| United States | Fox (English); Univision (Spanish) | |

== Symbols ==
=== Music ===
"You Are Unstoppable" by Austrian singer Conchita Wurst was the official anthem for the tournament.

"All the Way" by Reykon featuring Bebe Rexha was used for Univision's coverage of the tournament.

Awolnation's "I Am" was used for Fox's coverage.

== Controversies ==
=== Jamaican players' strike ===
On July 6, the Jamaica national team refused to attend a 7 pm practice session at the StubHub Center because of a strike over bonus fees. The next day, Jamaica Football Federation president Horace Burrell announced the situation had been "settled", and thanked the players for backing down.

=== Cuban defections ===
Cuba forward Keiler García defected to the United States in Chicago on July 8, the day before his team's opening match against Mexico at Soldier Field. He did not show up for the team breakfast in the hotel and was absent from the subsequent training session. Because of problems obtaining US visas for players and staff, and the defection of García, Cuba only had sixteen players available for their opener. Arael Argüellez also defected in Chicago after being visited in the hotel by friends, failing to turn up for the national team's flight to Phoenix for their second match against Trinidad and Tobago.

On July 14, Darío Suárez did not return from his trip to a supermarket prior to Cuba's match against Guatemala in Charlotte. Later the same day, midfielder Ariel Martínez was reported in tears on the team bus returning to the hotel following Cuba's 1–0 victory, which qualified them for the quarter-finals. Upon arrival, Martínez reportedly exited the bus, said goodbye to the coach, and then ran off into the night.

=== Cuban US visa issues ===
Cuba's opening match against Mexico was affected by United States visa issues. Cuba head coach Raúl González and six players (Adrián Diz, Arichel Hernandez, Daniel Luis, Andy Vaquero, Maikel Reyes and Sandy Sánchez) were unable to enter the United States before the match, which took place on the third day of the competition. They had all recently been involved in the 2015 CONCACAF Men's Olympic Qualifying Championship qualification tournament in Antigua and Barbuda, and it had caused some administration issues. Arichel Hernández ended up not entering the United States at all due to the visa problems.

=== Controversial refereeing ===
==== Mexico vs Costa Rica ====
During extra time of the quarter-final between Mexico and Costa Rica and with the match scoreless, head referee Walter López awarded a penalty for Mexico in the final minute of stoppage time, after assistant referee Eric Boria reported seeing a push by Costa Rican defender Roy Miller on Oribe Peralta in the penalty area. Mexico's Andrés Guardado scored the penalty, eliminating Costa Rica. Daniel Jiménez of La Nación described the elimination as "a theft"; however, Costa Rica manager Paulo Wanchope defended the call, saying "he [the referee] is human. He saw something in the area and that's why he called the penalty." Miller himself claimed Peralta's reaction was "exaggerated" and that there had only been minimal contact between them. In an interview conceded to Prensa Libre on July 23, Wálter López admitted that the call was mistaken, alleging that "due to my position on the field, I was unable to properly see the action. It was my assistant who helped me".

==== Panama vs Mexico ====
In the semi-final between Mexico and Panama, American referee Mark Geiger was involved in multiple disputed calls during the match in favor of Mexico. Firstly, he showed a dubious red card to Panama forward Luis Tejada in the 25th minute, after Tejada's arm caught Mexican defender Francisco Rodríguez in the face during an aerial duel. Later, as a ten-man Panama was a minute away from winning the match 1–0, he also awarded Mexico a controversial penalty kick for a handball; while defending in the penalty area against Mexican midfielder Carlos Esquivel, Panama captain Román Torres lost balance and fell backwards on the ball, touching it with his hand. The decision to award the penalty, questionably deemed as a deliberate handling of the ball, outraged the Panama team, who walked off the field and threatened to abandon the match. While the players were involved in a long scuffle with the officials, coaches, and other players on the sidelines, the fans repeatedly pelted them with beer glasses and other objects. Panama would return to the field after approximately ten minutes. Andrés Guardado scored the penalty and forced the match into extra time, which Mexico subsequently won after Guardado converted a second awarded penalty.

After the final whistle, the Panamanian players and coaching staff ran en masse on the pitch towards the referees, who had to be escorted off the field by security. Guardado later stated in an interview that it hurt to take the penalty and he considered missing the kick on purpose, but "had to be professional". Mexico coach Miguel Herrera argued there was no reason for Guardado to purposely miss the kick, referencing the controversial decision to award a late penalty to the Netherlands against Mexico at the 2014 World Cup. "I didn't hear that question in the World Cup when we were knocked out for a penalty that wasn't", he said. "It seems that only Mexico should declare itself guilty."

Following the semi-finals, the football associations of both Panama and Costa Rica released respective statements on their websites regarding the controversies, and requested the removal of the CONCACAF referee committee members. CONCACAF announced that they would discuss the matter at their executive committee meeting.

On July 24, the CONCACAF Disciplinary Committee suspended Panamanian goalkeeper Jaime Penedo for two matches for insulting the referee. This meant he would miss Panama's third-place play-off as well as their upcoming 2018 World Cup qualifier in November. On top of his one-match red card suspension, Tejada was also suspended for an additional match for insulting the referee.

=== Panama team banner ===
Following their semi-final defeat against Mexico, the Panamanian players reunited in their locker room and brandished a banner which read "CONCACAF Ladrones ("CONCACAF thieves") and three times "Corruptos" ("corrupt"), while pointing thumbs down in protest. The image was then circulated on Twitter. The CONCACAF Disciplinary Committee subsequently fined the Panamanian Football Federation $15,000 for this display.

=== Tournament organization ===
United States captain Michael Bradley criticized the organization of the tournament, commenting that there was too much traveling involved for teams and the stadiums had poor playing surfaces, while questioning the need for the two best third-placed teams to qualify to the next round. Mexico head coach Miguel Herrera was also critical of the travel arrangements, stating: "It's a disorder in the airplanes, having rival teams on the same flight, with so much people from CONCACAF, we were all squeezed in, we didn't even have room for our luggage, there was no room for our baggage, Mexico has been transporting their luggage on road and that's how we have been working". Both Herrera and Bradley were fined by CONCACAF for their comments.
