= 2016–17 Primera División de Nicaragua =

Primera División
- Season: 2016–17
- Champions: Apertura: Real Estelí; Clausura:Real Estelí
- Relegated: Nandasmo
- Champions League: -
- CONCACAF League: Real Estelí; Deportivo Walter Ferretti
- Matches: 130
- Goals: 400 (3.08 per match)
- Top goalscorer: Apertura: (Venezuela) Edward Morillo – 12 goals Clausura: (Mexico) Gregorio Torres – 9 goals
- Biggest home win: Apertura: Juventus Managua 10–0 Nandasmo; Clausura: UNAN Managua 10–2 Nandasmo
- Biggest away win: Apertura: Nandasmo 0–7 Walter Ferretti; Clausura: Nandasmo 1–5 Diriangén
- Highest scoring: Apertura: Real Madriz 8–3 Nandasmo; Clausura: UNAN Managua 10–2 Nandasmo
- Longest unbeaten run: Apertura: Real Estelí (18); Clausura: Real Estelí (8)
- Longest losing run: Apertura: Sebaco (8); Clausura: Nandasmo (8)

The 2016–17 season in Primera División de Nicaragua will be divided into two tournaments (Apertura and Clausura) and will determine the 69th and 70th champions in the history of the league. The Apertura tournament will be played in the second half of 2016, while the Clausura will be played in the first half of 2017.

== Format ==
The Apertura play-off format was changed from previous years, while the Clausura will use the same 4-team play-off format. For the Apertura, the top four teams from the regular stage advanced to a "quadrangular" double-round robin instead of a play-off stage. The regular stage and quadrangular winners would have played to decide the tournament's champion, but ultimately the same team won both and the final was not necessary. The same format was recently adopted by the Costa Rican Primera División, but for both half season.

== Teams ==
A total of 10 teams will contest the league, including 8 sides from the 2015–16 season and one sids directly promoted from the 2015–16 Segunda division. The final participant will be determined in a two-legged play-off, in which the 9th placed Primera division side ART Jalapa will play the team who finished second in Segunda division which was Sebaco. Sebaco won 4-3 on aggregate over ART Jalapa which meant they were promoted in the Primera Division.

- Deportivo Sebaco (Runner-up of the Segunda Division)
- Diriangén FC
- Juventus Managua
- Managua F.C.
- Nandasmo F.C. (Winner of the Segunda Division)
- Real Madriz
- Real Estelí F.C.
- UNAN Managua
- Chinandega FC
- Deportivo Walter Ferretti

=== Promotion and relegation ===
- At the end of the 2015–16, Nandasmo F.C. and Deportivo Sebaco was promoted to Primera Division
- At the end of the 2015–16, Deportivo Ocotal and ART Jalapa was relegated to Segunda Division.

== Apertura ==
=== Personnel and sponsoring (2016 Apertura) ===
Team	Manager	Captain	Kit manufacturer	Shirt sponsor
Diriangén FC	(Nicaragua) Tyron Acevedo	(Nicaragua) Jason Coronel	Joma	Claro
Chinandega FC	(Nicaragua) Reyna Espinoza	(Nicaragua) Léster Espinoza	TBD	TBD
Juventus Managua	(Colombia) Javier Londoño	(Nicaragua) Marlon Medina	TBD	TBD
Managua F.C.	(Costa Rica) Luis Fernando Fallas	(Nicaragua) Norfran Lazo	TBD	TBD
Nandasmo F.C.	(Nicaragua) Marcos Bodán	(Nicaragua) Alfredo Pérez	TBD	TBD
Real Madriz	(Honduras) Sindulio Castellanos	(Nicaragua) Alvaro Bermúdez	TBD	TBD
Real Estelí F.C.	(Nicaragua) Ramón Otoniel Olivas	(Nicaragua) Elmer Mejia	Galaxia	Movistar, La Curaçao
Deportivo Sebaco	(Nicaragua) Óscar Castillo	(Nicaragua) Joel Rivera	TBD	TBD
UNAN Managua	(Nicaragua) Edward Urroz	(Colombia) Jonathan Donado	Joma	UNAN Managua
Deportivo Walter Ferretti	(Brazil) Flavio Da Silva	(Nicaragua) Denis Espinoza	Grama	Claro, Disnorte Dissur

=== Managerial changes ===
==== Before the season ====
Team	Outgoing manager	Manner of departure	Date of vacancy	Replaced by	Date of appointment
Diriangén FC	(El Salvador) Jose Luis Rugamas	Resigned	2016	(Nicaragua) Tyron Acevedo	2016
Juventus Managua	(Nicaragua) Douglas Urbina	Contract finished	2016	(Colombia) Javier Londoño	2016
Managua F.C.	(Brazil) Flavio Da Silva	Resigned	2016	(Venezuela) Amleto Bonaccorso	2016
Deportivo Walter Ferretti	(Honduras) José Valladares	Contract finished	2016	(Brazil) Flavio Da Silva	2016

==== During the season ====
Team	Outgoing manager	Manner of departure	Date of vacancy	Replaced by	Date of appointment
Managua F.C.	(Venezuela) Amleto Bonaccorso	Resigned	August 2016	(Venezuela) Jack Galindo	August 2016
Managua F.C.	(Venezuela) Jack Galindo	Interim finished	September 2016	(Costa Rica) Luis Fernando Fallas	September 2016

=== Regular season ===
The regular season began on 2016. The top four finishers will move on to the next stage of the competition.

==== Scoring ====
- First goal of the season: (Uruguay) Rodrigo Valiente for Deportivo Walter Ferretti against UNAN Managua, 51 minutes (6 August 2016)
- First goal by a foreign player: (Uruguay) Rodrigo Valiente for Deportivo Walter Ferretti against UNAN Managua, 51 minutes (6 August 2016)
- Fastest goal in a match: 2 minutes
  - (Nicaragua) Remy Vanegas for Diriangen FC against Nandasmo F.C. (28 September 2016)
- Goal scored at the latest point in a match: 93 minutes
  - (Nicaragua) Anderson Acosta for Deportivo Sebaco against Chinandega FC (17 August 2016)
- First penalty Kick of the season: (Uruguay) Rodrigo Valiente for Deportivo Walter Ferretti against UNAN Managua, 51 minutes (6 August 2016)
- Widest winning margin: 10 goals
  - Juventus Managua 10–0 Nandasmo F.C. (26 October 2016)
- First hat-trick of the season: (Nicaragua) Rudel Calero for Real Estelí F.C. against Nandasmo F.C. (21 September 2016)
- First own goal of the season: (Nicaragua) Felix Rodriguez for UNAN Managua against Deportivo Walter Ferretti (21 September 2016)
- Most goals in a match: 11 goals
  - Real Madriz 8–3 Nandasmo F.C. (4 September 2016)
- Most goals by one team in a match: 10 goals
  - Juventus Managua 10–0 Nandasmo F.C. (26 October 2016)
- Most goals in one half by one team: 7 goals
  - Juventus Managua 10–0 Nandasmo F.C. (26 October 2016)
- Most goals scored by losing team: 3 goals
  - Real Madriz 8–3 Nandasmo F.C. (4 September 2016)
- Most goals by one player in a single match: 4 goals
  - (Nicaragua) Rudel Calero for Real Estelí F.C. against Nandasmo F.C. (21 September 2016)

==== Standings ====
Pos	Team	Pld	W	D	L	GF	GA	GD	Pts	Qualification
1	Real Estelí	18	14	4	0	45	4	+41	46	Championship Group
2	Walter Ferretti	18	9	6	3	32	12	+20	33	Championship Group
3	UNAN Managua	18	8	5	5	25	17	+8	29	Championship Group
4	Diriangén	18	7	7	4	26	22	+4	28	Championship Group
5	Chinandega	18	8	4	6	22	18	+4	28	
6	Real Madriz	18	7	3	8	38	34	+4	24	
7	Managua	18	5	7	6	26	24	+2	22	
8	Juventus Managua	18	5	5	8	29	22	+7	20	
9	Sebaco	18	3	2	13	13	40	−27	11	
10	Nandasmo	18	2	1	15	15	78	−63	7	

Updated to match(es) played on 26 October 2016. Source: Soccerway
Rules for classification: 1) points; 2) goal difference; 3) number of goals scored.

==== Results ====
Home \ Away	CHI	DIR	JUM	MAN	NAN	RES	RMA	SEB	UNM	WAF
Chinandega		3–1	1–0	1–1	3–0	0–2	3–0	0–1	1–0	0–0
Diriangén	1–1		1–1	1–1	3–2	0–0	1–1	2–1	0–1	2–2
Juventus Managua	1–2	1–2		2–2	10–0	0–4	4–0	1–0	1–1	1–0
Managua	0–0	2–3	1–0		4–0	1–2	3–3	3–1	0–1	1–2
Nandasmo	0–2	0–4	1–3	1–3		0–6	3–2	1–1	1–5	0–7
Real Estelí	1–0	3–1	1–1	4–0	7–0		3–0	1–0	0–0	0–0
Real Madriz	5–0	1–1	2–1	2–1	8–3	0–3		6–1	3–0	0–1
Sebaco	0–2	0–1	1–0	0–2	2–3	1–6	3–2		0–0	0–3
UNAN Managua	2–1	0–2	2–1	1–1	4–0	0–1	2–1	4–1		2–2
Walter Ferretti	3–2	2–0	1–1	0–0	4–0	0–1	1–2	3–0	1–0	

Updated to match(es) played on 26 October 2016. Source:
Legend: Blue = home team win; Yellow = draw; Red = away team win.

==== Positions by round ====
Team ╲ Round	1	2	3	4	5	6	7	8	9	10	11	12	13	14	15	16	17	18
Real Estelí	1	1	1	1	1	1	1	1	1	1	1	1	1	1	1	1	1	1
Walter Ferretti	5	5	8	9	8	7	7	7	7	4	2	4	4	4	4	2	2	2
UNAN Managua	4	3	5	3	2	2	3	2	2	2	3	6	7	7	7	5	5	3
Diriangén	6	6	4	2	6	3	5	6	6	3	5	3	3	3	2	3	3	4
Chinandega	2	2	2	4	4	5	6	3	3	6	4	2	2	2	3	4	4	5
Real Madriz	9	8	9	7	5	6	4	5	8	5	6	5	5	6	5	6	6	6
Managua	7	7	6	5	3	4	2	4	4	7	7	8	6	5	6	7	7	7
Juventus Managua	3	4	3	6	7	8	9	8	5	8	8	7	8	8	8	8	8	8
Sebaco	8	9	7	8	9	9	8	9	9	9	9	9	9	9	9	9	9	9
Nandasmo	10	10	10	10	10	10	10	10	10	10	10	10	10	10	10	10	10	10

Updated to match(es) played on 26 October 2016. Source:

=== Championship group ===
==== Standings ====
Pos	Team	Pld	W	D	L	GF	GA	GD	Pts	Qualification
1	Real Estelí	6	3	3	0	6	2	+4	12	Apertura Champion
2	Walter Ferretti	6	3	2	1	10	6	+4	11	
3	Diriangén	6	2	1	3	5	9	−4	7	
4	UNAN Managua	6	0	2	4	5	9	−4	2	

Updated to match(es) played on 04 December 2016. Source:
Rules for classification: 1) points; 2) goal difference; 3) number of goals scored.

==== Results ====
Home \ Away	DIR	RES	UNM	WAF
Diriangén		1–2	1–0	0–4
Real Estelí	0–0		1–0	2–0
UNAN Managua	1–2	1–1		1–1
Walter Ferretti	2–1	0–0	3–2	

Updated to match(es) played on 04 December 2016. Source:
Legend: Blue = home team win; Yellow = draw; Red = away team win.

== List of foreign players in the league ==
This is a list of foreign players in Apertura 2016. The following players:

1. have played at least one apertura game for the respective club.
2. have not been capped for the Nicaragua national football team on any level, independently from the birthplace

A new rule was introduced this year, that clubs can only have five foreign players in a squad.

Chinandega ✔

- (Colombia) Marlon Barrios
- (Colombia) Bryan Cañate
- (Colombia) Richard Junior Charris
- (Colombia) Johan Hurtado
- (Colombia) Yosimar Rivera
- (Honduras) Christian Izaguirre

Diriangén ✔

- (Argentina) Lucas Martella
- (Brazil) Rafael Vieira
- (Colombia) Erick Alcázar
- (Colombia) Armando Valdéz Caicedo
- (Honduras) Leonel Escoto

Juventus Managua ✔

- (Brazil) Jose Pereira da Silva
- (Colombia) Jorge Betancur
- (Colombia) Deybran Blanco
- (Colombia) Juan Esteban Ospina
- (Colombia) Juan Diego Uribe

Managua ✔

- (Brazil) Christiano da Lima
- (Colombia) Marlon Barrios
- (Honduras) Darwing Güity
- (Spain) Arán Pazos Balado
- (Venezuela) Genlis Piñero

Nandasmo

- (Colombia) Cristian Ortega
- (Colombia) Willer Alexander Rodriguez

(player released mid season)

Real Estelí ✔

- (Argentina) Juan Berdún
- (Brazil) Jonatas Ribeiro
- (Brazil) Maycon Santana
- (Colombia) Jonathan Mosquera
- (Mexico) Emilio López
- (Mexico) Gregorio Torres

Real Madriz ✔

- (Costa Rica) Eduardo Salas
- (Honduras) Marel Steven Álvarez
- (Honduras) Luis Valladarez
- (Venezuela) Edward Morillo
- (Venezuela) Karim Nasser

Sebaco

- (Colombia) Evaristo González
- (Colombia) Bryan Leal
- (Colombia) Andrés Solarte

UNAN Managua ✔

- (Colombia) Jonathan Donado
- (Colombia) Luis Fernándo González
- (Colombia) John Hernandez
- (Colombia) Rodrigo Hernandez
- (Honduras) Renan Lalin

Walter Ferretti ✔

- (Brazil) Robinson Luiz da Silva
- (Brazil) Pedro Augusto dos Santos Sousa
- (Honduras) Allan Gutiérrez
- (Uruguay) Bernardo Laureiro
- (Uruguay) Rodrigo Valiente

== Top goalscorers ==
Rank	Goalscorer	Team	Goals
1	(Venezuela) Edward Morillo	Real Madriz	12
2	(Mexico) Gregorio Torres	Real Estelí	11
3	(Nicaragua) Daniel Reyes	UNAN Managua	9
4	(Nicaragua) Norfran Lazo	Managua	8
5	(Nicaragua) Samuel Wilson	Real Estelí	8
6	(Nicaragua) Luis Galeano	Real Estelí	7
7	(Nicaragua) Edwin Herrera	Real Madriz	7
8	(Nicaragua) Remy Vanegas	Diriangén	7
9	(Colombia) John Hernandez	UNAN Managua	6
10	(Nicaragua) Alejandro Ruiz	Nandasmo	6

== Clausura ==
=== Personnel and sponsoring (2017 Clausura) ===
Team	Manager	Captain	Kit manufacturer	Shirt sponsor
Diriangén FC	(Nicaragua) Tyron Acevedo	(Nicaragua) Jason Coronel	Joma	Claro
Chinandega FC	(Nicaragua) Reyna Espinoza	(Nicaragua) Léster Espinoza	TBD	TBD
Juventus Managua	(Colombia) Javier Londoño	(Nicaragua) Marlon Medina	Grama	TBD
Managua F.C.	(Nicaragua) Emilio Aburto	(Nicaragua) Norfran Lazo	TBD	TBD
Nandasmo F.C.	(Nicaragua) Marcos Bodán	(Nicaragua) Alejandro Ruiz	TBD	TBD
Real Madriz	(Honduras) Sindulio Castellanos	(Nicaragua) Alvaro Bermúdez	TBD	TBD
Real Estelí F.C.	(Nicaragua) Ramón Otoniel Olivas	(Nicaragua) Manuel Rosas	Kappa	Movistar, La Curaçao
Deportivo Sebaco	(Argentina) Emiliano Barrera	(Nicaragua) Joel Rivera	TBD	TBD
UNAN Managua	(Nicaragua) Edward Urroz	(Nicaragua) David Solórzano	Joma	UNAN Managua
Deportivo Walter Ferretti	(Brazil) Flavio Da Silva	(Nicaragua) Denis Espinoza	Grama	Claro, Disnorte Dissur

=== Managerial changes ===
==== Before the season ====
Team	Outgoing manager	Manner of departure	Date of vacancy	Replaced by	Date of appointment
Managua F.C.	(Costa Rica) Luis Fernando Fallas	Resigned	November 2016	(Venezuela) Jack Galindo	November 2016
Deportivo Sebaco	(Nicaragua) Óscar Castillo	Resigned	November 2016	(Argentina) Emiliano Barrera	November 2016

==== During the season ====
Team	Outgoing manager	Manner of departure	Date of vacancy	Replaced by	Date of appointment
Managua F.C.	(Venezuela) Jack Galindo	Sacked	February 2017	(Nicaragua) Emilio Aburto	February 2017

=== Regular season ===
The regular season began on 2017. The top four finishers will move on to the next stage of the competition.

==== Scoring ====
- First goal of the season: (Nicaragua) Bismarck Montiel for Managua F.C. against UNAN Managua, 29 minutes (27 January 2017)
- First goal by a foreign player: (Panama) Luis Martínez Rangel for UNAN Managua against Managua F.C., 64 minutes (27 January 2017)
- Fastest goal in a match: 2 minutes
  - (Nicaragua) Alexis Chavez for Juventus Managua against Managua F.C. (3 February 2017)
- Goal scored at the latest point in a match: 94 minutes
  - (Colombia) Alonso Umaña for Chinandega FC against Deportivo Walter Ferretti (11 March 2017)
- First Penalty kick of the season: (Nicaragua) Bismarck Montiel for Managua F.C. against UNAN Managua, 29 minutes (27 January 2017)
- Widest winning margin: 8 goals
  - UNAN Managua 10–2 Nandasmo F.C. (8 March 2017)
- First hat-trick of the season: (Mexico) Gregorio Torres for Real Estelí F.C. against Nandasmo F.C. (11 February 2017)
- First own goal of the season: (Nicaragua) Juan Narváez for Diriangén FC against Deportivo Walter Ferretti (12 February 2017)
- Most goals in a match: 12 goals
  - UNAN Managua 10–2 Nandasmo F.C. (8 March 2017)
- Most goals by one team in a match: 10 goals
  - UNAN Managua 10–2 Nandasmo F.C. (8 March 2017)
- Most goals in one half by one team: 6 goals
  - UNAN Managua 10–2 Nandasmo F.C. (8 March 2017)
- Most goals scored by losing team: 2 goals
  - UNAN Managua 10–2 Nandasmo F.C. (8 March 2017)
- Most goals by one player in a single match: 4 goals
  - (Nicaragua) Daniel Reyes for UNAN Managua against Nandasmo F.C. (8 March 2017)

==== Standings ====
Pos	Team	Pld	W	D	L	GF	GA	GD	Pts	Qualification
1	Real Estelí	18	13	4	1	40	8	+32	43	Playoffs
2	Walter Ferretti	18	11	5	2	37	17	+20	38	Playoffs
3	Diriangén	18	9	6	3	32	24	+8	33	Playoffs
4	UNAN Managua	18	8	8	2	38	20	+18	32	Playoffs
5	Juventus Managua	18	9	4	5	39	25	+14	31	
6	Managua	18	5	6	7	31	30	+1	21	
7	Real Madriz	18	6	1	11	28	37	−9	19	
8	Chinandega	18	4	4	10	21	27	−6	16	
9	Sebaco	18	2	5	11	14	36	−22	11	
10	Nandasmo	18	1	1	16	17	73	−56	4	

Updated to match(es) played on 30 April 2017. Source: Soccerway
Rules for classification: 1) points; 2) goal difference; 3) number of goals scored.

==== Results ====
Home \ Away	CHI	DIR	JUM	MAN	NAN	RES	RMA	SEB	UNM	WAF
Chinandega		0–2	1–2	0–4	6–1	1–3	4–1	0–0	0–0	0–1
Diriangén	2–1		2–2	1–0	4–1	0–3	3–2	0–0	0–0	3–1
Juventus Managua	1–0	3–2		0–2	3–1	1–2	6–2	3–1	1–1	1–1
Managua	2–2	2–2	1–4		1–1	0–2	2–0	4–3	1–1	1–2
Nandasmo	2–3	1–5	0–7	1–4		1–4	1–5	2–0	0–5	0–3
Real Estelí	2–0	4–0	2–0	4–2	3–0		3–0	3–0	0–0	0–0
Real Madriz	0–1	1–2	3–1	2–1	2–1	0–3		4–0	1–3	1–1
Sebaco	1–0	2–2	0–1	2–2	2–1	0–0	1–2		2–3	0–2
UNAN Managua	1–0	1–1	1–1	1–1	10–2	2–1	2–1	5–0		1–5
Walter Ferretti	2–2	0–1	3–2	2–1	6–1	1–1	2–1	2–0	3–1	

Updated to match(es) played on 30 April 2017. Source:
Legend: Blue = home team win; Yellow = draw; Red = away team win.

==== Positions by round ====
Team ╲ Round	1	2	3	4	5	6	7	8	9	10	11	12	13	14	15	16	17	18
Real Estelí	1	2	2	2	2	1	1	1	1	1	1	1	1	1	1	1	1	1
Walter Ferretti	5	5	7	7	7	6	4	4	4	2	2	5	5	3	2	2	2	2
Diriangén	8	7	5	3	3	3	3	2	3	4	3	2	2	2	4	4	3	3
UNAN Managua	4	6	3	5	5	4	5	5	5	5	4	3	3	4	3	5	4	4
Juventus Managua	3	1	1	1	1	2	2	3	2	3	5	4	4	5	5	3	5	5
Managua	6	8	8	8	9	9	9	9	9	9	8	7	6	6	6	6	6	6
Real Madriz	7	4	6	4	6	5	6	6	6	6	6	6	7	7	7	7	7	7
Chinandega	2	3	4	6	4	7	7	7	7	7	7	8	8	8	8	8	8	8
Sebaco	10	9	9	9	8	8	8	8	8	8	9	9	9	9	9	9	9	9
Nandasmo	9	10	10	10	10	10	10	10	10	10	10	10	10	10	10	10	10	10

Updated to match(es) played on 30 April 2017. Source:

=== Playoffs ===
==== Semi-finals ====
3 May 2017

Diriangén	1 – 0	Walter Ferretti
E. Téllez 45' (pen.)	Report

Estadio Olímpico de San Marcos
Referee: E. Lezama
7 May 2017

Walter Ferretti	1 – 0	Diriangén
L. Peralta 39'	Report
Penalties
	3 – 2

Nicaragua National Football Stadium
Referee: J. Arbizu

3 May 2017

UNAN Managua	0 – 1	Real Estelí
	Report	E. Mejía 58'

Nicaragua National Football Stadium
Referee: R. Gonzalez
6 May 2017

Real Estelí	1 – 1	UNAN Managua
L. Galeano 7'	Report	R. Baquedano 77'

Estadio Independencia
Referee: E. Lezama

==== Finals ====
13 May 2017

Walter Ferretti	1 – 2	Real Estelí
B. Laureiro 87' (pen.)	Report	G. Torres 66' (pen.) 82'

Nicaragua National Football Stadium
Referee: O. Davila
20 May 2017

Real Estelí	1 – 1	Walter Ferretti
L. Galeano 6'	Report	B. Laureiro 38' (pen.)

Estadio Independencia
Referee: E. Lezama

== List of foreign players in the league ==
This is a list of foreign players in Clausura 2017. The following players:

1. have played at least one apertura game for the respective club.
2. have not been capped for the Nicaragua national football team on any level, independently from the birthplace

A new rule was introduced this year, that clubs can only have five foreign players in a squad.

Chinandega ✔

- (Colombia) Erwin Cabrera
- (Colombia) Bryan Cañate
- (Colombia) Yosimar Rivera
- (Colombia) Alonso Umaña
- (Honduras) Christian Izaguirre

Diriangén

- (Colombia) Erick Alcázar
- (Colombia) Miguel Estrada
- (Colombia) Armando Valdéz Caicedo
- (Honduras) Arlis Andino

Juventus Managua

- (Colombia) Deybran Blanco
- (Colombia) Juan Esteban Ospina
- (Colombia) Juan Diego Uribe
- (Costa Rica) Kenneth Carvajal

Managua

- (Brazil) Christiano da Lima
- (Brazil) Thiago Lima da Silva
- (Colombia) Marlon Barrios
- (Paraguay) Francisco Miranda

Nandasmo

- (Colombia) Cristian Ortega
- (Colombia) Camilo Quiñonez
- (Colombia) Willer Alexander Rodriguez
- (Colombia) Yilmar Salas

(player released mid season)

Real Estelí ✔

- (Brazil) José Vagno Fontes dos Santos
- (Brazil) Vitinho
- (Mexico) Gerardo Aguilar
- (Mexico) Juan Carlos López
- (Mexico) Gregorio Torres

Real Madriz ✔

- (Honduras) Marel Steven Álvarez
- (Honduras) Grodbin Antonio Benítez Aguilar
- (Honduras) Edwin Castro
- (Honduras) Luis Valladarez
- (Venezuela) Edward Morillo

Sebaco ✔

- (Argentina) Rodrigo de Brito
- (Argentina) Axel Oyeras
- (Argentina) Juan Sánchez
- (Paraguay) Jorge Darío Florentín
- (Venezuela) Miguel Leonardo Sosa González

UNAN Managua ✔

- (Colombia) Rodrigo Hernández
- (Colombia) Óscar Palomino
- (Honduras) Renan Lalin
- (Panama) Luis Martínez Rangel
- (Paraguay) Ever Benítez

Walter Ferretti ✔

- (Brazil) Robinson Luiz da Silva
- (Brazil) Pedro Augusto dos Santos Sousa
- (Colombia) Eder Munive
- (Honduras) Allan Gutiérrez
- (Uruguay) Bernardo Laureiro

== Top goalscorers ==
Rank	Goalscorer	Team	Goals
1	(Mexico) Gregorio Torres	Real Estelí	12
2	(Honduras) Edwin Castro	Real Madriz	6
3	(Nicaragua) Anderson Acosta	Sebaco	5
=	(Colombia) Yosimar Rivera	Chinandega	5
5	(Colombia) Erick Alcazar	Diriangén	4
=	(Honduras) Arlis Andino	Diriangén	4
=	(Nicaragua) Léster Bonilla	Chinandega	4
=	(Uruguay) Bernardo Laureiro	Walter Ferretti	4
=	(Panama) Luis Martínez Rangel	UNAN Managua	4
=	(Nicaragua) Daniel Reyes	UNAN Managua	4

== Championship playoff ==
As the winners of both the Apertura and Clausura tournaments, Real Estelí were declared the season champions without a playoff. It is their 14th league title.

== Aggregate table ==
Pos	Team	Pld	W	D	L	GF	GA	GD	Pts	Qualification or relegation
1	Real Estelí (C)	36	27	8	1	85	12	+73	89	Qualification for 2017 CONCACAF League
2	Walter Ferretti	36	20	11	5	69	29	+40	71	Qualification for 2017 CONCACAF League
3	UNAN Managua	36	16	13	7	63	37	+26	61	
4	Diriangén	36	16	13	7	58	46	+12	61	
5	Juventus Managua	36	14	9	13	68	47	+21	51	
6	Chinandega	36	12	8	16	43	45	−2	44	
7	Managua	36	10	13	13	57	54	+3	43	
8	Real Madriz	36	13	4	19	66	71	−5	43	
9	Sebaco (R)	36	5	7	24	27	76	−49	22	Relegation play-off
10	Nandasmo (R)	36	3	2	31	32	151	−119	11	Relegation to 2017-2018 Segunda División de Fútbol de Nicaragua

Updated to match(es) played on 30 April 2017. Source:
Rules for classification: 1) points; 2) goal difference; 3) number of goals scored.
(C) Champions; (R) Relegated

== Relegation playoff ==
The ninth place team in the aggregate table, Sebaco, played a two-leg playoff against the second place team from the Segunda División de Nicaragua, San Francisco, for one spot in next season's Primera División.

23 June 2017

San Francisco	2–1	Sebaco

26 June 2017

Sebaco	1–1	San Francisco

San Francisco won 3-2 on aggregate and are promoted to the Primera División. Sebaco are relegated to the Segunda División.
