= 2018–19 Liga Primera =

Liga Primera
- Season: 2018–19
- Champions: Apertura: Managua; Clausura: Real Estelí
- Relegated: UNAN Managua
- CONCACAF League: Managua; Real Estelí
- Matches: 65
- Goals: 181 (2.78 per match)
- Top goalscorer: Apertura: Lucas Dos Santos (15 goals) – Clausura: TBD –
- Biggest home win: Apertura: Real Estelí 5-0 Ocotal; Clausura: TBD TBD
- Biggest away win: Apertura: Real Madriz 1-6 Managua; Clausura: TBD TBD
- Highest scoring: Apertura: Ocotal 4-3 Real Estelí; Real Madriz 1-6 Managua; Clausura: TBD TBD
- Longest unbeaten run: Apertura: TBD; Clausura: TBD
- Longest losing run: Apertura: TBD; Clausura: TBD

The 2018–19 Liga Primera de Nicaragua season was divided into two tournaments (Apertura and Clausura) and determined the 71st and 72nd champions in the history of the Liga Primera de Nicaragua, the top division of football in Nicaragua. The Apertura tournament was played in the second half of 2018, while the Clausura was played in the first half of 2019.

== Format ==
The Apertura play-off format was changed from previous years, while the Clausura will use the same 4-team play-off format. For the Apertura, the top four teams from the regular stage advanced to a "quadrangular" double-round robin instead of a play-off stage. The regular stage and quadrangular winners would have played to decide the tournament's champion, but ultimately the same team won both and the final was not necessary. The same format was recently adopted by the Costa Rican Primera División, but for both half seasons.

== Team information ==
A total of ten teams contested the league, including eight sides from the 2017–18 Primera División, and two sides from the 2017–18 Segunda División.

FC San Francisco Masachapa finished last in the aggregate table and were relegated to the Segunda División. The champions from the Segunda División, ART Municipal Jalapa were promoted in their place.

The 9th place team in the aggregate table, Chinandega FC, faced the second place team from the Segunda División, Deportivo Sebaco, in a playoff for a spot in the Primera División. However, due to Sebaco's financial problems, they were not allowed in the playoff, meaning Chinandega remained in Primera División.

=== Promotion and relegation ===
Promoted from Segunda División as of July, 2018.

- Champions: ART Municipal Jalapa

Relegated to Segunda División as of July, 2018.

- Last Place: FC San Francisco Masachapa

== Managerial changes ==
=== Before the start of the season ===
Team	Outgoing manager	Manner of departure	Date of vacancy	Replaced by	Date of appointment	Position in table
Walter Ferretti	(Brazil) Flavio da Silva	Resigned	June 2018	(Nicaragua) Henry Urbina	June 29, 2018	3rd & Semifinalist (Clausura 2018)
Real Esteli	(Nicaragua) Ramon Otenel	Contract finished	June 2018	(Uruguay) Washington Fernando Araújo	July 22, 2018	4th & Quarterfinalist (Clausura 2018)
Juventus Managua	(Honduras) Héctor Mediana	Resigned	June 2018	(Argentina) Roberto Chanampe	July 2018	3rd & Semifinalist (Clausura 2018)
Ocotal	(Nicaragua) Randall Moreno	Resigned	June 2018	(Nicaragua) Jorge Luis Vanegas	July 2018	TBD (Clausura 2018)
Real Madriz	(Nicaragua) Tyrone Acevedo	Resigned	June 2018	(Nicaragua) Carlos Matamoros	July 2018	TBD (Clausura 2018)

=== During the Apertura season ===
Team	Outgoing manager	Manner of departure	Date of vacancy	Replaced by	Date of appointment	Position in table
Real Madriz	(Nicaragua) Carlos Matamoros	TBD	2018	(Nicaragua) Miguel Ángel Sánchez	2018	TBD (Apertura 2018)

=== Between Apertura and Clausura seasons ===
Team	Outgoing manager	Manner of departure	Date of vacancy	Replaced by	Date of appointment	Position in table
Ocotal	(Nicaragua) Jorge Luis Vangeas	Sacked	December 2018	(Nicaragua) Mario Alfaro	December 2018	9th (Apertura 2018)
Real Esteli	(Uruguay) Washington Fernando Araújo	Resigned	December 2018	(Nicaragua) Sergio Ivan Rodríguez	December 2018	2nd & finalist (Apertura 2018)
Real Madriz	(Nicaragua) Miguel Ángel Sánchez	Resigned	December 2018	(Honduras) Sindulio Castellanos	January 2019	7th (Apertura 2018)
UNAN Managua	(Nicaragua) Luis Vega	resigned	December 2018	(Nicaragua) Daniel García	January 2019	

=== Clausura 2019 seasons ===
Team	Outgoing manager	Manner of departure	Date of vacancy	Replaced by	Date of appointment	Position in table
Real Madriz	(Honduras) Sindulio Castellanos	Sacked	February 2019	(El Salvador) Angel Orellana	February 2019	9th (Clausura 2019)

== Apertura ==
=== Personnel and sponsoring ===
Team	Manager	Captain	Kit manufacturer	Kit sponsors
ART Municipal Jalapa	(Nicaragua) Leonidas Rodríguez	(Nicaragua) Victor Zavala	Joma	Agrotris
Chinandega	(Nicaragua) Reyna Espinoza	(Nicaragua) Lester Espinoza	Nil	Nil
Diriangén FC	(Nicaragua) Mauricio Cruz	(Nicaragua) Jason Coronel	Joma	Claro, Ocal, Victoria frost
Juventus Managua	(Argentina) Roberto Chanampe	(Honduras) Darwin Guity	TBD	TBD
Managua	(Nicaragua) Emilio Aburto	(Nicaragua) Erling Méndez	Nil	Nil
Ocotal	(Nicaragua) Jorge Luis Vanegas	(Nicaragua) Guillermo Espino	Nil	Alcadia Ocotal
Real Estelí	(Uruguay) Washington Fernando Araújo	(Nicaragua) Jason Casco	Kappa	Beco, Movistar, La Curaçao, Banpro, Vitalsis
Real Madriz	(Nicaragua) Carlos Matamoros x	(Nicaragua) Alvaro Bermúdez	TBD	Alcadia Somoto
UNAN Managua	(Nicaragua) Luis Vega	(Nicaragua) Marvin Fletes	Joma	Nil
Walter Ferretti	(Nicaragua) Henry Urbina	(Nicaragua) René Huete	Umbro	Claro, Iniser, Disnorte Dissur

=== Standings ===
Pos	Team	Pld	W	D	L	GF	GA	GD	Pts	Qualification or relegation
1	Managua	18	14	2	2	40	17	+23	44	Advance to Playoffs (Semifinals)
2	Real Estelí	18	10	6	2	33	12	+21	36	Advance to Playoffs (Semifinals)
3	Walter Ferretti	18	7	7	4	21	18	+3	28	Advance to Playoffs (Quarterfinals)
4	Real Madriz	18	7	6	5	25	29	−4	27	Advance to Playoffs (Quarterfinals)
5	Diriangén	18	7	5	6	23	19	+4	26	Advance to Playoffs (Quarterfinals)
6	Juventus Managua	18	7	3	8	25	20	+5	24	Advance to Playoffs (Quarterfinals)
7	ART Jalapa	18	5	4	9	15	30	−15	19	
8	Chinandega	18	4	6	8	24	33	−9	18	
9	Ocotal	18	3	6	9	17	32	−15	15	
10	UNAN Managua	18	2	3	13	19	32	−13	9	

Source: Soccerway
Rules for classification: 1) points; 2) goal difference; 3) number of goals scored.

=== Results ===
Home \ Away	ART	CHI	DIR	JUV	MAN	OCO	RES	RMA	UNA	WAL
ART Jalapa	—	2–0	0–3	1–3	0–3	1–2	1–0	1–1	1–0	0–0
Chinandega	4–1	—	1–3	0–1	1–3	0–0	3–3	3–0	2–2	2–2
Diriangén	0–2	1–2	—	0–0	1–0	3–1	0–0	1–1	3–1	0–0
Juventus Managua	0–1	3–0	2–1	—	1–2	1–0	1–2	2–3	2–1	4–0
Managua	5–1	1–2	2–0	3–2	—	2–0	2–1	4–2	1–0	1–0
Ocotal	1–0	0–0	1–2	0–0	2–5	—	1–1	2–2	0–0	1–2
Real Estelí	1–1	6–1	1–0	2–1	1–1	3–0	—	4–0	1–0	0–0
Real Madriz	1–1	3–2	2–1	1–0	0–0	3–2	0–2	—	2–1	1–2
UNAN Managua	4–0	2–1	1–2	2–2	2–3	2–3	0–4	0–2	—	0–1
Walter Ferretti	2–1	0–0	2–2	1–0	1–2	5–1	0–1	1–1	2–1	—

Updated to match(es) played on completed. Source: Soccerway
Legend: Blue = home team win; Yellow = draw; Red = away team win.
For upcoming matches, an "a" indicates there is an article about the rivalry between the two participants.

=== Records ===
==== Top goalscorers ====
No.	Player	Club	Goals
1	(Brazil) Lucas Dos Santos	Managua	15
2	(Nicaragua) Luis Coronel	Diriangén	11
3	(Colombia) Yeiner Vivas	Chinandega	10
4	(Nicaragua) Luis Galeano	Real Esteli	8
5	(Brazil) Bruno De Morais	Walter Ferretti	7
6	(Nicaragua) Marcos Rivera	TBD	5
7	(Nicaragua) Isaac Sequeira	TBD	5
8	(Venezuela) Edward Morillo	Managua	5
9	(Nicaragua) Ulises Rayo	TBD	5
10	(Colombia) Marlon Barrios	Real Madriz	5

=== Playoffs ===
==== Quarterfinals ====
7 November 2018

Walter Ferretti	1 – 2	Juventus Managua
Bruno de Morais 77'		Junior Arteaga 36'; David Castrillón 93'

Estadio Nacional, Managua

Juventus Managua progressed.

7 November 2018

Real Madriz	4 – 5	Diriangén
Aldryn Ramírez 19'31'43'72'		Erick Tellez (45’61’65’90+6 90+12)

Estadio Solidaridad, Somoto
Attendance: 71’672
Referee: Juan Esparado

Diriangén progressed.

==== Semifinals ====
Team 1	Agg.	Team 2	1st leg	2nd leg
Real Esteli	7 – 3	Juventus Managua	2 – 1	5 – 2
Managua F.C.	4 – 1	Diriangén	2 – 1	2 – 0

TBD wins on away goals

===== First leg =====
November 24, 2018
7:00pm

Juventus Managua	1 – 2	Real Esteli
Nasser Valverde 84'		Jorge Betancur 3'; Luis Galeano 79'

Estadio Nacional, Managua
Referee: Miller Lopez

November 25, 2018
3:00pm

Diriangén	1 – 2	Managua F.C.
Jorge Garcia 9'		Lucas dos Santos 13'; Agenor Báez 72'

Estadio Cacique, Diriangén
Referee: Rodolfo Paiz

===== Second leg =====
December 1, 2018

Real Esteli	5 – 2	Juventus Managua
Luis Galeano 3' 38'; Nasser Valverde own 45'; Vinicius de Souza 59'; Alexis Somarriba 85'		Nasser Valverde 15'; Brandon Ayerdis 86'

Estadio Independencia, Esteli

Real Esteli won 7-3 on aggregate.

December 2, 2018

Managua F.C.	2 – 0	Diriangén
Edward Murillo 28'; Jeffery Araica 62'		Nil

Estadio Nacional, Managua

Managua won 4-1 on aggregate.

==== Final ====
===== First leg =====
December 8, 2018
19:00

Real Esteli	0 – 0	Managua F.C.
Nil		Nil

Estadio Independencia, Esteli
Referee: Erick Lezama

===== Second leg =====
December 15, 2018
19:00

Managua F.C.	1 – 0	Real Esteli
Lucas dos Santos 118'		Nil

Estadio Nacional, Managua
Referee: Nitzar Sandoval

Managua won 1-0 on aggregate.

Apertura 2018 champions

1st title

== Clausura ==
=== Personnel and sponsoring ===
Team	Manager	Captain	Kit manufacturer	Kit Sponsors
ART Jalapa	(Nicaragua) Leonidas Rodríguez	TBD	TBD	Agrotris
Chinandega	(Nicaragua) Reyna Espinoza	(Nicaragua) Lester Espinoza	Nil	Nil
Diriangén FC	(Nicaragua) Mauricio Cruz	(Argentina) Carlos Torres	Joma	Claro, Victoria Frost, Babysec, Sinsa, OCAL, Kelloggs, Flor de Cana
Juventus Managua	(Argentina) Roberto Chanampe	(Nicaragua) Alexis Somarriba	Nil	Nil
Managua	(Nicaragua) Emilio Aburto	(Brazil) Christiano Fernández	Nil	Managua FC
Ocotal	(Nicaragua) Mario Alfaro	(Honduras) Marcos Rivera	Nil	Alcadia de Ocotal
Real Estelí	(Nicaragua) Sergio Ivan Rodríguez	(Nicaragua) Manuel Rosas	Kappa	Movistar, La Curaco, Beco, Vitalsis Health, Banco de la Producción
Real Madriz	(Honduras) Sindulio Castellanos	(Nicaragua) Alvaro Bermúdez	Nil	Alcadia de Madriz
UNAN Managua	(Nicaragua) Daniel García	(Nicaragua) Diedrich Téllez	Joma	Nil
Walter Ferretti	(Nicaragua) Henry Urbina	(Nicaragua) Denis Espinoza	Umbro	Claro, Iniser, Disnorte Dissur, Flor de Cana

=== Standings ===
Pos	Team	Pld	W	D	L	GF	GA	GD	Pts	Qualification or relegation
1	Real Estelí	18	14	3	1	44	13	+31	45	Advance to Playoffs (Semifinals)
2	Managua	18	13	1	4	51	24	+27	40	Advance to Playoffs (Semifinals)
3	Walter Ferretti	18	11	3	4	31	15	+16	36	Advance to Playoffs (Quarterfinals)
4	Juventus Managua	18	8	2	8	40	40	0	26	Advance to Playoffs (Quarterfinals)
5	Diriangén	18	7	4	7	36	29	+7	25	Advance to Playoffs (Quarterfinals)
6	Ocotal	18	6	5	7	27	25	+2	23	Advance to Playoffs (Quarterfinals)
7	UNAN Managua	18	5	3	10	25	38	−13	18	
8	Real Madriz	18	3	6	9	16	31	−15	15	
9	ART Jalapa	18	4	3	11	22	54	−32	15	
10	Chinandega	18	3	2	13	15	38	−23	11	

Source: Soccerway
Rules for classification: 1) points; 2) goal difference; 3) number of goals scored.

=== Results ===
Home \ Away	ART	CHI	DIR	JUV	MAN	OCO	RES	RMA	UNA	WAL
ART Jalapa	—	1–0	2–4	4–1	2–2	1–1	0–10	0–2	0–0	1–2
Chinandega	2–3	—	1–2	2–4	0–4	0–1	0–3	2–0	1–1	0–3
Diriangén	6–2	5–0	—	3–1	3–1	1–1	2–3	2–2	1–0	1–1
Juventus Managua	6–1	5–0	2–1	—	2–3	3–0	2–2	3–3	3–2	2–1
Managua	3–0	3–1	5–3	6–1	—	4–2	0–1	5–1	3–1	1–2
Ocotal	2–1	1–0	3–0	1–2	1–2	—	1–2	3–2	2–2	1–2
Real Estelí	6–2	1–0	1–0	3–1	2–1	1–1	—	4–0	3–0	1–0
Real Madriz	0–1	0–0	0–0	3–0	0–3	0–0	0–1	—	2–1	0–3
UNAN Managua	4–1	3–2	2–1	4–2	1–3	0–5	0–3	3–1	—	2–3
Walter Ferretti	3–0	4–0	2–1	1–0	1–2	2–1	0–0	0–0	1–2	—

Updated to match(es) played on 28 April 2019. Source: Soccerway
Legend: Blue = home team win; Yellow = draw; Red = away team win.
For upcoming matches, an "a" indicates there is an article about the rivalry between the two participants.

=== Records ===
==== Top goalscorers ====
No.	Player	Club	Goals
1	(Venezuela) Edward Morillo	Managua F.C.	17
2	(Brazil) Lucas Oliveira	Managua F.C.	16
3	(Brazil) Douglas Caé	Real Esteli	12
4	(Brazil) Robinson Luiz	Juventus Managua	10
5	(Costa Rica) Yeison Esquivel	Diriangén FC	8
6	(Nicaragua) Ervin Aguirre	Deportivo Ocotal	7
7	(Nicaragua) Luis Coronel	Diriangén FC	7
8	(Colombia) Jafett Del Portillo	ART Municipal Jalapa	7
9	(Nicaragua) Aaron Chavez	UNAN Managua	6
10	(Nicaragua) Junior Arteaga	Juventus Managua	5

=== Playoffs ===
Quarterfinals
4	Juventus Managua	1
5	Diriangén	2
3	Walter Ferretti	1
6	Ocotal	0

Semifinals
1	Real Estelí	0	3	3
5	Diriangén	1	0	1
2	Managua (a)	1	0	1
3	Walter Ferretti	1	0	1

Finals
1	Real Estelí (a)	3	0	3
2	Managua	3	0	3

==== Quarterfinals ====
5 May 2019

Walter Ferretti	1 – 0	Ocotal
Rafael De Almeida 69'		Nil

Estadio Nacional de Fútbol, Managua

Walter Ferretti progressed.

6 May 2019

Juventus Managua	1 – 2	Diriangén
Allan Mercado 82'		Luis Coronel 57'; Yeison Esquivel 62'

Estadio Nacional, Managua

Diriangén progressed.

==== Semifinals ====
===== First leg =====
May 12, 2019
7:00pm

Diriangén	1 – 0	Real Esteli
Luis Coronel 7'		Nil

Estadio Cacique Diriangén, Diriamba
Referee: Nitzar Sandoval

May 13, 2019
6:00pm

Walter Ferretti	1 – 1	Managua F.C.
Rodrigo Hernandez 62'		Christiano Fernandez 73'

Estadio Olímpico del IND Managua, Managua
Referee: Ricardo Mendoza

===== Second leg =====
May 18, 2019
7:00pm

Real Esteli	3 – 0	Diriangén
Oscar López 11'; Henry García 64'; Luis Lopez 76'		Nil

Estadio Independencia, Estelí
Referee: Ricardo Mendoza

Real Esteli progressed 3-1 on aggregate.

May 19, 2019
6:00pm

Managua F.C.	0 – 0	Walter Ferretti
Nil		Nil

Estadio Olímpico del IND Managua, Managua
Referee: Odanel Velez

Managua F.C. advances 1-0 on away goals.

==== Final ====
===== First leg =====
May 25, 2019
19:00

Managua F.C.	3 – 3	Real Esteli
Kevin Serpio 74'; Lucas Dos Santos 42' 66'		Cristian Gutierrez 45'; Ricardo Rivas 39'; Vinicius da Souza 90'

Estadio Nacional, Managua
Referee: Oscar Davila

===== Second leg =====
June 1, 2019
19:00

Real Esteli	0 – 0	Managua F.C.

Estadio Independencia, Esteli
Referee: Nitzar Sandoval

3-3, Real Esteli won on away goal.

Clausura 2019 champions

15th title

== Aggregate table ==
Pos	Team	Pld	W	D	L	GF	GA	GD	Pts	Qualification or relegation
1	Managua (Q)	36	27	3	6	91	41	+50	84	CONCACAF League round of 16 (Note: As Apertura champions (NCA1))
2	Real Estelí (Q)	36	24	9	3	77	25	+52	81	CONCACAF League preliminary round (Note: As Clausura champions (NCA2))
3	Walter Ferretti	36	18	10	8	52	33	+19	64	
4	Diriangén	36	14	9	13	59	48	+11	51	
5	Juventus Managua	36	15	5	16	65	60	+5	50	
6	Real Madriz	36	10	12	14	41	60	−19	42	
7	Ocotal	36	9	11	16	44	57	−13	38	
8	ART Jalapa	36	9	7	20	37	84	−47	34	
9	Chinandega (Q)	36	7	8	21	39	71	−32	29	Relegation playoffs
10	UNAN Managua (R)	36	7	6	23	44	70	−26	27	Relegated to Segunda División

Source: Soccerway Soccerway
Rules for classification: 1) points; 2) goal difference; 3) number of goals scored.
(Q) Qualified for the phase indicated; (R) Relegated

== List of foreign players in the league ==
This is a list of foreign players in the 2018–19 season. The following players:

1. Have played at least one game for the respective club.
2. Have not been capped for the Nicaragua national football team on any level, independently from the birthplace

A new rule was introduced this season, that clubs can have four foreign players per club and can only add a new player if there is an injury or a player/s is released and it is before the close of the season transfer window.

ART Jalapa
- (Colombia) Cristhian Cabria
- (Colombia) Evaristo González
- (Colombia) Erwin Cabrera
- (Mexico) Alexis Hernández
- (Colombia) Jafet Del Portillo

Chinandega
- (Colombia) Johan Hurtado
- (Colombia) Brayan Cañate
- (Colombia) Richard Charris
- (Colombia) Yeiner Vivas
- (Colombia) José Mendoza

Diriangén
- (Brazil) Pedro Dos Santos
- (Argentina) Carlos Tórres
- (Costa Rica) Yeison Esquivel
- (United States) (Mexico) Juan Pablo Fernández
- (United States) (Mexico) Jesús Cervantes
- (Mexico) Dahan Virgen

Juventus Managua
- (Honduras) Darwin Guity
- (Honduras) Herbert Cabrera
- (Colombia) David Castrillón
- (Brazil) Robinson Luiz
- (Colombia) Yeison Díaz
- (Colombia) Ezequiel Góngora

Managua
- (Honduras) Marel Álvarez
- (Brazil) Lucas Dos Santos
- (Brazil) Cristiano Fernández da Lima
- (Venezuela) Edward Morillo

Ocotal
- (Colombia) Aldair Niño
- (Colombia) Jafet Del Portillo
- (Mexico) Edgard Hernández
- (Colombia) Lancelott Devenish
- (Colombia) Nelson Maldonado
- (Honduras) Gerson Díaz
- (Honduras) Cristopher Aguilar
- (Honduras) Kevin Meraz

Real Estelí
- (Uruguay) Richard Rodríguez
- (Brazil) Maycon Santana
- (Brazil) Vinicius da Souza
- (Colombia) Jorge Betancur
- (Colombia) Eder Chaux
- (Brazil) Douglas Caé
- (Brazil) Roninho De Souza

Real Madriz
- (Honduras) Erlyn Ruiz
- (Colombia) Jose Estrada
- (Mexico) Edder Mondragón
- (Colombia) Marlon Barrios
- (Colombia) Cristhian Cabria
- (El Salvador) Nahun Martínez

UNAN
- (Colombia) Jesus Guerrero
- (Honduras) Allan Gutiérrez

Walter Ferretti
- (Brazil) Rafael De Almeida
- (Brazil) Bruno de Morais
- (Colombia) Rodrigo Hernández
- (Costa Rica) Johan Bonilla
- (Brazil) Paulo Cézar

(player released during the Apertura season) (player released between the Apertura and Clausura seasons) (player released during the Clausura season)
