= 2017–18 Primera División de Nicaragua =

Primera División
- Season: 2017–18
- Champions: Apertura: Walter Ferretti; Clausura: Diriangén
- Relegated: San Francisco Masachapa
- CONCACAF League: Walter Ferretti; Diriangén
- Matches: 65
- Goals: 181 (2.78 per match)
- Top goalscorer: Carlos Chavarría (18 goals)
- Biggest home win: Apertura: Real Estelí 5-0 Ocotal (28 July 2017); Real Madriz 5–0 UNAN Managua (22 October 2017); Clausura: Diriangén 6–0 Chinandega (21 January 2018); Real Estelí 7–1 Juventus Managua (3 February 2018); Diriangén 7–1 Real Madriz (7 April 2019)
- Biggest away win: Apertura: Real Madriz 1-6 Managua (1 October 2017); Clausura: Juventus Managua 0–4 Managua (19 January 2018)
- Highest scoring: Apertura: Real Madriz 1–6 Managua (30 September 2017); Ocotal 4–3 Real Estelí (8 October 2017); Clausura: Real Estelí 7–1 Juventus Managua (3 February 2018); Walter Ferretti 4–3 Juventus Managua (17 February 2018); Diriangén 7–1 Real Madriz (7 April 2019)
- Longest unbeaten run: Apertura: 9 games Real Estelí; Clausura: 12 games Real Estelí
- Longest losing run: Apertura: 5 games UNAN Managua; Clausura: 5 games San Francisco Masachapa

The 2017–18 Primera División de Nicaragua season was divided into two tournaments (Apertura and Clausura) and determined the 69th and 70th champions in the history of the league. The Apertura tournament was played in the second half of 2017, while the Clausura was played in the first half of 2018.

== Format ==
The Apertura play-off format was changed from previous years, while the Clausura used the same 4-team play-off format. For the Apertura, the top four teams from the regular stage advanced to a "quadrangular" double-round robin instead of a play-off stage. The regular stage and quadrangular winners would have played to decide the tournament's champion, but ultimately the same team won both and the final was not necessary. The same format was recently adopted by the Costa Rican Primera División, but for both half seasons.

== Team information ==
A total of 10 teams contested the league, including 8 sides from the 2016–17 Primera División and 2 sides from the 2016–17 Segunda División.

At the end of the 2016–17 Primera División, Nandasmo finished last in the aggregate table and were relegated to the Segunda División. Taking their place was the champions from the Segunda División, Deportivo Ocotal.

The 9th place team in the aggregate table, Deportivo Sebaco, faced the second place team from the Segunda División, San Francisco Masachapa, in a playoff for a spot in the Primera División. San Francisco Masachapa won the playoff 3-2 on aggregate and were promoted, while Deportivo Sebaco were relegated.

=== Promotion and relegation ===
Promoted from Segunda División as of June, 2017.

- Champions: Ocotal
- Runners-up (via playoff): San Francisco Masachapa

Relegated to Segunda División as of June, 2017.

- Last Place: Nandasmo
- Ninth Place (via playoff): Deportivo Sebaco

=== Personnel and sponsoring ===
Team	Manager	Captain	Kit manufacturer
Chinandega	(Nicaragua) Reyna Espinoza	TBD	TBD
Diriangén FC	(Nicaragua) Mauricio Cruz	TBD	TBD
Juventus Managua	(Mexico) Javier Martínez Espinoza	TBD	TBD
Managua	(Nicaragua) Tyrone Acevedo	TBD	TBD
Ocotal	(Nicaragua) Randall Moreno	TBD	TBD
Real Estelí	(Nicaragua) Otoniel Olivas	TBD	TBD
Real Madriz	(Mexico) Jorge Luis Ramos Pinacho/Arturo Zavala	TBD	TBD
San Francisco Masachapa	(Colombia) Luis Javier Londoño	TBD	TBD
UNAN Managua	(Nicaragua) Daniel García	TBD	TBD
Walter Ferretti	(Brazil) Flavio Da Silva	TBD	TBD

== Apertura ==
=== Personnel and sponsoring ===
Team	Manager	Captain	Kit manufacturer	
Chinandega	(Nicaragua) Reyna Espinoza	TBD	TBD	TBD
Diriangén FC	(Nicaragua) Mauricio Cruz	TBD	TBD	TBD
Juventus Managua	(Mexico) Javier Martínez Espinoza	TBD	TBD	TBD
Managua	(Nicaragua) Tyrone Acevedo	TBD	TBD	TBD
Ocotal	(Nicaragua) Randall Moreno	TBD	TBD	TBD
Real Estelí	(Nicaragua) Otoniel Olivas	TBD	TBD	TBD
Real Madriz	(Mexico) Arturo Zavala	TBD	TBD	TBD
San Francisco Masachapa	(Colombia) Luis Javier Londoño	TBD	TBD	TBD
UNAN Managua	(Nicaragua) Daniel García	TBD	TBD	TBD
Walter Ferretti	(Brazil) Flavio Da Silva	TBD	TBD	TBD

== Managerial changes ==
=== During the season ===
Team	Outgoing manager	Manner of departure	Date of vacancy	Replaced by	Date of appointment
Real Madriz	(Mexico) Abraham Zavala	Resigned	2017	(Uruguay) Daniel Bartolotta	2017
UNAN Managua	(Nicaragua) Daniel Garcia	Resigned	2017	(Nicaragua) Edward Urroz	2017
Managua F.C.	(Nicaragua) Tyron Acevedo	Resigned	2017	(Nicaragua) Emilio Aburto	2017
FC San Francisco Masachapa	(Colombia) Luis Javier Londono	Resigned	2017	(Nicaragua) Jeffrey Perez	2017
Ocotal	(Nicaragua) Randall Moreno	Resigned	2017	(Argentina) Emiliano Barrera	2017

=== Standings ===
Pos	Team	Pld	W	D	L	GF	GA	GD	Pts	Qualification
1	Real Estelí	18	13	3	2	41	15	+26	42	Championship Group
2	Walter Ferretti	18	11	3	4	33	15	+18	36	Championship Group
3	Diriangén	18	7	6	5	29	22	+7	27	Championship Group
4	Managua	18	8	2	8	27	23	+4	26	Championship Group
5	Juventus Managua	18	6	7	5	21	20	+1	25	
6	Real Madriz	18	5	6	7	28	35	−7	21	
7	Ocotal	18	5	6	7	19	32	−13	21	
8	Chinandega	18	5	4	9	26	41	−15	19	
9	UNAN Managua	18	4	4	10	14	24	−10	16	
10	San Francisco Masachapa	18	2	7	9	15	26	−11	13	

Updated to match(es) played on 4 October 2017. Source: Soccerway
Rules for classification: 1) points; 2) goal difference; 3) number of goals scored.

=== Records ===
==== Top Goalscorers ====
No.	Player	Club	Goals
1	(Mexico) Mauricio Castaneda	Real Madriz	12
2	(Nicaragua) Carlos Chavarria	Real Esteli	11
3	(Uruguay) Bernardo Laureiro	Deportivo Walter Ferretti	11
4	(Honduras) Jarel Puerto	Chinandega FC	11
5	(Venezuela) Edward Morrillo	Managua F.C.	7
6	(Nicaragua) Ulises Rayo	Deportivo Ocotal	7
7	(Nicaragua) Luis Gutierrez	Diriangén F.C.	6
8	(Colombia) Marlon Barrios	Real Madriz	5
9	(Mexico) Carlos Felix	Juventus Managua	5
10	(Colombia) Rodrigo Hernandez	UNAN Managua	5
10	(Colombia) Eder Munive	Deportivo Walter Ferretti	5

=== Results ===
Home \ Away	CHI	DIR	JUM	MAN	OCO	RES	RMA	SFM	UNM	WAF
Chinandega		3–3	2–1	3–3	1–3	2–2	3–1	3–1	1–0	0–4
Diriangén	4–1		2–1	1–2	4–1	0–2	3–0	1–1	2–0	0–2
Juventus Managua	3–0	1–1		2–1	1–0	1–0	1–1	1–0	2–2	1–2
Managua	4–0	0–2	2–1		0–0	1–2	0–1	3–1	0–1	1–2
Ocotal	1–1	2–2	1–1	2–0		4–3	1–1	1–3	1–0	0–0
Real Estelí	1–0	1–1	5–1	4–0	5–0		3–1	3–0	2–0	1–0
Real Madriz	4–3	1–1	1–1	1–6	2–1	1–2		2–2	5–0	0–2
San Francisco Masachapa	1–2	1–0	0–0	0–2	0–1	1–1	1–2		1–1	1–1
UNAN Managua	1–0	0–1	0–0	0–1	4–0	1–2	3–2	0–0		0–1
Walter Ferretti	4–1	3–1	0–2	0–1	4–0	1–2	2–2	2–1	3–1	

Updated to match(es) played on 4 October 2017. Source: Soccerway
Legend: Blue = home team win; Yellow = draw; Red = away team win.

=== Playoffs ===
==== Semi-finals ====
4 November 2017

Diriangén	1 – 0	Walter Ferretti
Luis Gutierrez 84'

20 November 2017

Walter Ferretti	1 – 0	Diriangén
Rene Huete 73'
Penalties
	7 – 6

Nicaragua National Football Stadium

1-1. Walter Ferretti advanced on Penalties.

4 November 2017

Managua F.C.	0 – 1	Real Estelí
		Elmer Mejia 88'

Nicaragua National Football Stadium
Referee: R. Gonzalez
19 November 2017

Real Estelí	1 – 2	Managua
Luis Galeano 35'		Agenor Cano 51'; Christiano 63'

Estadio Independencia

2-2. Managua advanced on away goal.

==== Finals ====
26 November 2017

Managua	1-1	Walter Ferretti
Agenor Báez 63'	Report	Bernardo Laureiro 7'

Proyecto de Estadio
Referee: Ricardo Hernandez
3 December 2017

Walter Ferretti	0-0	Managua
None	Report	None

Proyecto de Estadio Nacional
Referee: Odanel Velez

1-1. Walter Ferretti won on away goal

Apertura 2017 champions

4th title

== Clausura ==
=== Personnel and sponsoring ===
Team	Manager	Captain	Kit manufacturer
Chinandega	(Nicaragua) Reyna Espinoza	TBD	TBD
Diriangén FC	(Nicaragua) Mauricio Cruz x	TBD	TBD
Juventus Managua	(Nicaragua) Oscar Blanco	TBD	TBD
Managua	(Nicaragua) Emilio Aburto	TBD	TBD
Ocotal	(Honduras) Carlos Cardona	TBD	TBD
Real Estelí	(Nicaragua) Otoniel Olivas x	TBD	TBD
Real Madriz	(Nicaragua) Tyron Acevedo	TBD	TBD
San Francisco Masachapa	(Nicaragua) Jeffrey Perez	TBD	TBD
UNAN Managua	(Uruguay) Carlos Avedissian	TBD	TBD
Walter Ferretti	(Brazil) Flavio Da Silva x	TBD	TBD

== Managerial changes ==
=== Before the Clasura season ===
Team	Outgoing manager	Manner of departure	Date of vacancy	Replaced by	Date of appointment
Real Madriz	(Uruguay) Daniel Bartolotta	Resigned	December 2017	(Nicaragua) Tyron Acevedo	December 2017
Ocotal	(Argentina) Emiliano Barrera	Resigned	December 2017	(Honduras) Carlos Cardona	January 2018
UNAN Managua	(Nicaragua) Edward Urroz	Resigned	December 2017	(Uruguay) Carlos Avedissian	December 2017
Juventus Managua	(Mexico) Javier Martinez	Resigned	December 2017	(Nicaragua) Oscar Blanco	January 2018

=== During the Clasura season ===
Team	Outgoing manager	Manner of departure	Date of vacancy	Replaced by	Date of appointment
Juventus Managua	(Nicaragua) Oscar Blanco	Resigned	February 2018	(Honduras) Héctor Mediana	February 2018
UNAN Managua	(Uruguay) Carlos Avedissian	Resigned	February 2018	(Nicaragua) Luis Vega	February 2018

=== Standings ===
Pos	Team	Pld	W	D	L	GF	GA	GD	Pts	Qualification
1	Real Estelí	18	13	2	3	41	13	+28	41	Championship Group
2	Diriangén	18	9	4	5	37	20	+17	31	Championship Group
3	Juventus Managua	18	9	3	6	29	27	+2	30	Championship Group
4	Walter Ferretti	18	7	7	4	25	23	+2	28	Championship Group
5	Ocotal	18	7	4	7	28	28	0	25	
6	Managua	18	6	6	6	29	21	+8	24	
7	UNAN Managua	18	6	4	8	24	23	+1	22	
8	Real Madriz	18	5	5	8	16	31	−15	20	
9	Chinandega	18	3	7	8	14	30	−16	16	
10	San Francisco Masachapa	18	1	6	11	14	37	−23	9	

Source: Soccerway
Rules for classification: 1) points; 2) goal difference; 3) number of goals scored.

=== Results ===
Home \ Away	CHI	DIR	JUM	MAN	OCO	RES	RMA	SFM	UNM	WAF
Chinandega		2–1	0–2	2–2	1–1	1–3	0–0	0–0	2–1	2–2
Diriangén	6–0		3–3	1–0	2–4	1–0	7–1	4–0	0–1	1–0
Juventus Managua	0–0	2–0		2–2	4–1	2–3	1–0	2–0	2–1	0–0
Managua	2–0	2–2	1–3		1–0	2–3	1–1	4–0	2–3	0–2
Ocotal	5–2	1–1	1–0	1–3		2–1	4–0	1–1	1–0	1–4
Real Estelí	1–0	1–1	7–1	0–0	2–1		1–2	5–1	2–0	1–0
Real Madriz	2–0	1–3	1–0	2–1	0–2	0–1		0–0	5–0	0–1
San Francisco Masachapa	1–0	1–2	1–3	0–0	4–1	1–3	2–2		1–3	1–2
UNAN Managua	2–1	0–2	0–1	1–1	0–0	1–3	4–0	3–0		2–2
Walter Ferretti	0–0	1–0	4–3	0–3	2–1	1–4	2–2	1–1	1–1	

Updated to match(es) played on unknown. Source: Soccerway
Legend: Blue = home team win; Yellow = draw; Red = away team win.

=== Records ===
==== Top Goalscorers ====
No.	Player	Club	Goals
1	(Mexico) Carlos Felix	Juventus Managua	11
2	(Brazil) Lucas Oliviera	Managua F.C.	8
3	(Costa Rica) Andres Mendoza	Diriangén F.C.	8
4	(Mexico) Gregorio Torres	Real Esteli	8
5	(Nicaragua) Carlos Chavarria	Real Esteli	7
6	(Costa Rica) Yeison Esquivel	Diriangén F.C.	7
7	(Spain) Pablo Gallego	Real Esteli	7
8	(Nicaragua) Erling Ruiz	Deportivo Ocotal	7
9	(Nicaragua) Luis Coronel	Diriangén F.C.	5
10	(Colombia) Brandon Mena	San Francisco	5
10	(Venezuela) Edward Morrillo	Managua F.C.	5

=== Playoffs ===
Semifinals
1	Real Estelí	1	2	3
4	Walter Ferretti	1	0	1
2	Diriangén	1	2	3
3	Juventus Managua	2	0	2

Final
1	Real Estelí
2	Diriangén

==== Semi-finals ====
30 April 2018

Walter Ferretti	1 – 1	Real Estelí
Eder Munive 20'		Luis Lopez 30'

Proyecto de Estadio
6 May 2018

Real Estelí	2 – 0	Walter Ferretti
Gregorio Torres 69'; Marlon Lopez 75'		None

Estadio Independencia

Real Esteli won 3-1 on aggregate.

30 April 2018

Juventus Managua	2 – 1	Diriangén
Anderson Treminio 5' 30'		Andres Mendoza 65'

Proyecto de Estadio
6 May 2018

Diriangén	2 – 0	Juventus Managua
Agner Acuna 51'; Andres Mendoza 71'		None

Diriangen won 3-2 on aggregate.

==== Finals ====
26 May 2018

Diriangén	2 - 1	Real Estelí
Carlos Torres 30' 81'		Gregorio Torres 25'

Estadio Cacique Diriangén, Diriamba
Referee: Rodolfo Paiz
3 June 2018

Real Estelí	1-1	Diriangén
Pablo Gállego 62'		Luis Fernando Coronel 95'

Estadio Independencia, Estelí
Referee: Erick Lezama

Diriangen won 3-2 on aggregate.

Clausura 2018 champions

26th title

== List of foreign players in the league ==
This is a list of foreign players in the 2017–18 season. The following players:

1. Have played at least one game for the respective club.
2. Have not been capped for the Nicaragua national football team on any level, independently from the birthplace

A new rule was introduced this season, that clubs can have four foreign players per club and can only add a new player if there is an injury or a player is released and it's before the close of the season transfer window.

Chinandega

- (Colombia) Jairo Olivares
- (Honduras) Jarel Puerto
- (Colombia) Brayan Cañate
- (Colombia) Richard Charris
- (Honduras) Allan Gutiérrez

Diriangén

- (Costa Rica) Henry Niño
- (Costa Rica) Francisco Rodriguez
- (Colombia) Erick Alcázar
- (Costa Rica) Johan Bonilla
- (Costa Rica) Brandon Salazar
- (Costa Rica) Andrés Mendoza
- (Brazil) Pedro Dos Santos
- (Costa Rica) Josué Meneses
- (Argentina) Carlos Tórres
- (Costa Rica) Yeison Esquivel

Juventus Managua

- (Brazil) Maycon Santana
- (Colombia) Luis Fernando González
- (Honduras) Darwin Guity
- (Mexico) Carlos Félix
- (Mexico) Diego de la Cruz

Managua

- (Brazil) Cristiano Fernández da Lima
- (Brazil) Vinicius da Souza
- (Brazil) Lucas Oliviera
- (Colombia) Armando Valdez
- (Honduras) Lisandro Andino
- (Venezuela) Edward Morillo
- (Costa Rica) Oscar Urróz

Masachapa/San Francisco

- (Colombia) Brandon Mena
- (Colombia) Carlos Mosquera
- (Honduras) Ever Rodríguez
- (Mexico) Ernesto Benítez
- (Argentina) Enzo Brahim
- (Colombia) Raúl Nomesque

Ocotal

- (Colombia) Cristhian Cabria
- (Colombia) Nelson Maldonado
- (Honduras) Rolín Álvarez
- (Honduras) Erlyn Ruíz
- (Honduras) Marcos Rivera
- (Colombia) Juan Sebastián Bedoya

Real Estelí

- (Mexico) Gregorio Torres
- (Brazil) Gabriel Da Silva
- (Brazil) Revson Santos
- (Uruguay) Lucas Rodríguez
- (Uruguay) Gastón Pagan
- (Colombia) Guillermo Sierra
- (Colombia) Jorge Betancur
- (Uruguay) Richard Rodríguez
- (Spain) Pablo Gállego

Real Madriz

- (Mexico) Edder Mondragón
- (Mexico) Mauricio Castañeda
- (Honduras) Marel Álvarez
- (Colombia) Marlon Barrios
- (Colombia) Jesus Guerrero

UNAN

- (Paraguay) Ever Benítez
- (Brazil) Daniel Venancio
- (Guatemala) Franklin García
- (Brazil) Gledson Pereira
- (Colombia) Rodrigo Hernández
- (Colombia) Juan Diego Uribe
- (Colombia) Oscar Castillo Palomino

Walter Ferretti

- (Colombia) Yosimar Rivera
- (Brazil) Rafael De Almeida
- (Brazil) Robinson Luiz
- (Uruguay) José Bernardo Laureiro
- (Colombia) Eder Munive

(player released during the Apertura season) (player released between the Apertura and Clausura seasons) (player released during the Clausura season)

== Aggregate table ==
Pos	Team	Pld	W	D	L	GF	GA	GD	Pts	Qualification or relegation
1	Real Estelí	36	26	5	5	82	32	+50	83	
2	Diriangén	36	18	10	8	58	38	+20	64	2018 CONCACAF League
3	Juventus Managua	36	16	10	10	66	42	+24	58	
4	Managua	36	15	10	11	50	47	+3	55	
5	Ocotal	36	14	8	14	56	44	+12	50	
6	Walter Ferretti	36	12	10	14	47	60	−13	46	2018 CONCACAF League
7	Real Madriz	36	10	11	15	44	66	−22	41	
8	UNAN Managua	36	10	8	18	38	47	−9	38	
9	Chinandega	36	8	11	17	40	71	−31	35	Relegation play-off
10	San Francisco Masachapa	36	3	13	20	29	63	−34	22	Relegation to 2018-2019 Segunda División de Fútbol de Nicaragua

Source: RSSSF
Rules for classification: 1) points; 2) goal difference; 3) number of goals scored.
