= Ariagner Smith =

Nicaraguan footballer

Personal information
- Full name: Ariagner Steven Smith Medina
- Date of birth: 13 December 1998 (age 27)
- Place of birth: Somoto, Madriz, Nicaragua
- Height: 1.87 m (6 ft 2 in)
- Position: Striker

Team information
- Current team: Ulytau
- Number: 11

Senior career*
Years	Team	Apps	(Gls)
2014–2018	Real Estelí	41	(8)
2018–2023	Spartaks Jūrmala	37	(8)
2019	→ Qizilqum Zarafshon (loan)	11	(3)
2019	→ Lokomotiv Tashkent (loan)	10	(1)
2021	→ Sputnik Rechitsa (loan)	7	(2)
2021	→ Veles Moscow (loan)	19	(1)
2022	→ Panevėžys (loan)	34	(8)
2023–2026	Panevėžys	94	(30)
2026–	Ulytau	24	(2)

International career^{‡}
2017–	Nicaragua	20	(7)
- * Club domestic league appearances and goals as of 1 November 2026 ‡ National team caps and goals as of 10 June 2025

Ariagner Steven Smith Medina (born 13 December 1998) is a Nicaraguan professional footballer who plays as a striker for Kazakhstan Premier League club Ulytau, and the Nicaragua national team.

== Career ==
=== Club ===
He has played club football for Real Estelí and Spartaks Jūrmala. In 2015 he trained with Italian club Udinese.

On 7 February 2022, Smith signed for A Lyga club Panevėžys on loan for the season.

=== International ===
Smith made his international debut for Nicaragua in 2017.

== Career statistics ==
=== Club ===
As of match played 21 November 2021

Appearances and goals by club, season and competition
Club	Season	League			National Cup		Continental		Other		Total	
Club	Season	Division	Apps	Goals	Apps	Goals	Apps	Goals	Apps	Goals	Apps	Goals
Real Estelí	2014–15	Liga Primera de Nicaragua	1	1	—		—		—		1	0
Real Estelí	2015–16	Liga Primera de Nicaragua	7	0	—		—		—		7	0
Real Estelí	2016–17	Liga Primera de Nicaragua	12	1	—		0 (Note: Appearances in the CONCACAF Champions League)	0	—		12	1
Real Estelí	2017–18	Liga Primera de Nicaragua	21	6	—		1 (Note: Appearances in the CONCACAF League)	0	—		22	6
Real Estelí	Total		41	8	-	-	1	0	-	-	42	8
Spartaks Jūrmala	2018	Virslīga	12	1	2	1	5 (Note: One appearance in the UEFA Champions League, four appearances and three goals in the UEFA Europa League)	3	—		19	5
Spartaks Jūrmala	2019	Virslīga	0	0	0	0	—		—		0	0
Spartaks Jūrmala	2020	Virslīga	25	7	1	0	—		—		26	7
Spartaks Jūrmala	2021	Virslīga	0	0	0	0	—		—		0	0
Spartaks Jūrmala	2022	Virslīga	0	0	0	0	—		—		0	0
Spartaks Jūrmala	Total		37	8	3	1	5	3	-	-	45	12
Qizilqum Zarafshon (loan)	2019	Uzbekistan Super League	11	3	0	0	—		—		11	3
Lokomotiv Tashkent (loan)	2019	Uzbekistan Super League	10	1	1	0	0 (Note: Appearances in the AFC Champions League)	0	0 (Note: Appearances in the Uzbekistan Super Cup)	0	11	1
Sputnik Rechitsa (loan)	2021	Belarusian Premier League	7	2	0	0	—		—		7	2
Veles Moscow (loan)	2021–22	FNL	19	1	3	1	—		—		22	2
Panevėžys (loan)	2022	A Lyga	0	0	0	0	0 (Note: Appearances in the UEFA Europa Conference League)	0	—		0	0
Career total			84	15	7	2	6	3	-	-	97	20

=== International ===
As of match played 27 March 2023

Appearances and goals by national team and year
National team	Year	Apps	Goals
Nicaragua	2017	3	0
Nicaragua	2021	2	3
Nicaragua	2022	7	1
Nicaragua	2023	2	2
Total		14	6

Scores and results list Nicaragua's goal tally first.

List of international goals scored by Ariagner Smith
No.	Date	Venue	Opponent	Score	Final score	Competition
1	27 March 2021	Estadio Panamericano, San Cristóbal, Dominican Republic	Turks and Caicos Islands	2–0	7–0	2022 FIFA World Cup qualification
2	8 September 2021	Estadio Panamericano, San Cristóbal, Dominican Republic	Turks and Caicos Islands	3–0	7–0	2022 FIFA World Cup qualification
3	8 September 2021	Estadio Pensativo, Antigua, Guatemala	Guatemala	1–1	2–2	Friendly
4	14 June 2022	Nicaragua National Football Stadium, Managua, Nicaragua	Bahamas	4–0	4–0	2022–23 CONCACAF Nations League B
5	24 March 2023	Nicaragua National Football Stadium, Managua, Nicaragua	Saint Vincent and the Grenadines	1–0	4–1	2022–23 CONCACAF Nations League B
5	27 March 2023	Dwight Yorke Stadium, Bacolet, Trinidad and Tobago	Trinidad and Tobago	1–0	1–1	2022–23 CONCACAF Nations League B
