= 2015–16 Primera División de Nicaragua =

Primera División
- Season: 2015–16
- Champions: Apertura: UNAN Managua; Clausura: Real Esteli
- Relegated: Deportivo Ocotal; ART Municipal Jalapa
- Champions League: Real Esteli
- Matches: 192
- Goals: 556 (2.9 per match)
- Top goalscorer: Apertura: Daniel Reyes - 13 goals Clausura: Luis Galeano; Carlos Chavarría - 13 goals
- Biggest home win: Apertura: UNAN Managua 9-1 Jalapa; Clausura: UNAN Managua 5-1 Juventus Managua
- Biggest away win: Apertura: Managua 0-5 Real Esteli; Clausura: Ocotal 0-5 Real Esteli; Juventus Managua 0-5 Real Esteli
- Highest scoring: Apertura: UNAN Managua 9-1 Jalapa; Clausura: Real Madriz 2-5 Real Esteli
- Longest unbeaten run: Apertura: Real Esteli (15); Clausura: Real Esteli (14)
- Longest losing run: Apertura: Real Madriz (6); Clausura: Juventus Managua (6)

The 2015–16 season in Primera División de Nicaragua was divided into two tournaments (Apertura and Clausura) and determined the 67th and 68th champions in the history of the league. It also provided the sole berth for the 2016–17 CONCACAF Champions League. The Apertura tournament was played in the second half of 2015, while the Clausura was played in the first half of 2016.

== Teams ==
A total of 10 teams will contest the league, including 8 sides from the 2015–16 season and one sids directly promoted from the 2014–145Segunda division. The final participant will be determined in a two-legged play-off, in which the 9th placed Primera division side UNAN Managua will play the team who finished second in Segunda division which was FC San Marcos. UNAN Managua won 6-0 on aggregate over FC San Marcos which meant they stayed in the Primera Division.

- ART Jalapa
- Diriangén FC
- UCEM Juventus FC
- Managua F.C.
- Deportivo Ocotal
- Real Madriz
- Real Esteli F.C.
- UNAN Managua
- Chinandega FC (Winner of the Segunda Division)
- Walter Ferretti

=== Promotion and relegation ===
- At the end of the 2014–15, Chinandega FC was promoted to Primera Division
- At the end of the 2014–15, Fox Villa was relegated to Segunda Division.

== Apertura ==
=== Team information ===
Last updated: 2015

=== Personnel and sponsoring (2015 Apertura) ===
Team	Manager	Captain	Kit manufacturer	Shirt sponsor
ART Jalapa	(Nicaragua) Tyson Acevedo	(Nicaragua)	TBD	Claro, Argoris
Diriangén FC	(Argentina) Andrés Novara	(Nicaragua) David Solorzano	Joma	Claro, Totto
Chinandega FC	(Nicaragua) Reina Espinoza	(Nicaragua)	TBD	TBD
Juventus F.C.	(Nicaragua) Oscar Blanco	(Nicaragua)	TBD	TBD
Managua F.C.	(Nicaragua) Carlos Zambrana	Silvio Aviles	TBD	Uno Lubricantes
Deportivo Ocotal	(Argentina) Roberto Chanampe	(Nicaragua)	TBD	TBD
Real Madriz	(Nicaragua) Leónidas Rodríguez	(Nicaragua)	TBD	TBD
Real Esteli F.C.	(Nicaragua) Ramón Otoniel Olivas	(Honduras) (Nicaragua) Elmer Mejia	Galaxia	TBD
UNAN Managua	(Nicaragua) Edward Urroz	(Nicaragua) Roberto Carlos Vanegas	Joma	UNAN Managua
Walter Ferretti	(Brazil) Flavio Da Silva	(Nicaragua) Denis Espinoza	TBD	TBD

== Managerial changes ==
=== Before the season ===
Team	Outgoing manager	Manner of departure	Date of vacancy	Replaced by	Date of appointment
Deportivo Ocotal	(El Salvador) Juan Ramon Trejo	Contract Finished	2015	(Argentina) Roberto Chanampe	2015
Diriangén FC	(Argentina) Roberto Chanampe	Contract finished	2015	(Argentina) Andrés Novara	2015

=== During the season ===
Team	Outgoing manager	Manner of departure	Date of vacancy	Replaced by	Date of appointment
Deportivo Walter Ferretti	(Brazil) Flavio Da Silva	Resigned	September 2015	(Costa Rica) Marvin Solano	September 2015
Deportivo Ocotal	(Argentina) Roberto Chanampe	Resigned	September 2015	(Honduras) Airon Reyes García	September 2015
Diriangén FC	(Argentina) Andrés Novara	Sacked	October 2015	(Colombia) Javier Londono	October 2015
Deportivo Ocotal	(Honduras) Airon Reyes García	Sacked	October 2015	(Nicaragua) Flavio Vanegas	October 2015

=== Regular season ===
The regular season began on 2015. The top four finishers will move on to the next stage of the competition.

=== Scoring ===
- First goal of the season: (Colombia) Rodrigo Hernandez own goal for Managua F.C. against UNAN Managua, 10 minutes (15 August 2015)
- First goal by a foreign player: (Colombia) Jonathan Donado for UNAN Managua against Managua F.C., 20 minutes (15 August 2015)
- Fastest goal in a match: 10 minute - (El Salvador) TBD for TBD against TBD (TBD TBD 2015)
- Goal scored at the latest point in a match: 94 minutes - (El Salvador) Christian Cisneros for Metapan against C.D. Chalatenango (1 August 2015)
- First penalty Kick of the season: (Nicaragua) Marlon Lopez for Managua F.C. against UNAN Managua, 75 minutes (15 August 2015)
- Widest winning margin: 8 goals
  - UNAN Managua 9–1 ART Municipal Jalapa (18 November 2015)
- First hat-trick of the season: (Nicaragua) Darwin Ramirez for Juventus Managua against Real Madriz (August 24, 2015)
- First own goal of the season: (Colombia) Rodriguez Hernandez (UNAN Managua) for Managua F.C. (August 152015)
- Most goals in a match: 10 Goals UNAN Managua 9–1 ART Municipal Jalapa (18 November 2015)
  Juventus Managua 5–5 Managua F.C. (15 August 2015)
- Most goals by one team in a match: 9 Goals
  - UNAN Managua 9–1 ART Municipal Jalapa (18 November 2015)
- Most goals in one half by one team: 5 Goals UNAN Managua 9–1 ART Municipal Jalapa (18 November 2015)
- Most goals scored by losing team: 2 Goals
  - ART Jalapa 2–5 Real Madriz (September, 2015)
- Most goals by one player in a single match: 5 Goals
  - (Nicaragua) Daniel Reyes for UNAN Managua against ART Municipal Jalapa (18 November 2015)

==== Standings ====
Pos	Team	Pld	W	D	L	GF	GA	GD	Pts	Qualification
1	Real Esteli	18	14	2	2	46	9	+37	44	Semi-finals Group
2	Walter Ferretti	18	12	2	4	37	19	+18	38	Semi-finals Group
3	UNAN Managua	18	11	4	3	40	20	+20	37	Semi-finals Group
4	Diriangén	18	9	2	7	28	21	+7	29	Semi-finals Group
5	Juventus Managua	18	7	4	7	32	27	+5	25	
6	Chinandega	18	5	6	7	18	25	−7	21	
7	Managua	18	4	6	8	32	38	−6	18	
8	Jalapa	18	3	5	10	15	40	−25	14	
9	Ocotal	18	3	4	11	23	39	−16	13	
10	Real Madriz	18	3	3	12	23	56	−33	12	

Updated to match(es) played on 2015. Source:
Rules for classification: 1) points; 2) goal difference; 3) number of goals scored.

==== Results ====
Home \ Away	JAL	CHI	DIR	JUV	MAN	OCO	RES	RMD	UNA	WFE
Jalapa		2–1	1–1	1–0	1–1	1–0	0–1	1–2	0–0	0–3
Chinandega	3–0		1–1	1–1	1–0	2–1	0–2	0–0	0–2	0–0
Diriangén	2–1	2–0		4–2	2–0	2–0	2–1	3–2	3–1	0–1
Juventus Managua	3–1	1–1	1–0		1–0	1–0	0–3	7–0	1–2	2–4
Managua	1–1	2–1	3–1	5–5		6–2	0–5	5–0	3–3	2–5
Ocotal	2–2	1–1	2–1	1–2	1–1		0–3	4–1	1–3	4–0
Real Esteli	4–0	2–0	2–0	1–1	4–1	2–0		6–0	0–1	2–1
Real Madriz	5–2	2–3	0–4	1–4	1–0	3–3	2–5		2–2	0–2
UNAN Managua	9–1	6–0	1–0	1–0	1–1	2–1	0–2	3–1		3–2
Walter Ferretti	2–0	0–3	2–0	1–0	3–1	6–0	1–1	2–1	2–0	

Updated to match(es) played on unknown. Source:
Legend: Blue = home team win; Yellow = draw; Red = away team win.

==== Positions by round ====
Team ╲ Round	1	2	3	4	5	6	7	8	9	10	11	12	13	14	15	16	17	18
Real Esteli	2	4	6	6	6	5	6	4	5	5	5	6	5	3	2	2	1	1
Managua	5	8	10	10	10	10	10	9	10	9	10	10	8	8	8	8	7	7
Walter Ferretti	4	5	3	2	2	1	1	2	2	1	1	3	1	1	1	1	2	2
UNAN Managua	6	2	4	3	3	2	2	1	1	2	2	2	2	2	4	3	3	3
Diriangén	1	1	1	1	1	3	4	5	3	3	3	1	4	4	3	4	4	4
Juventus Managua	8	3	5	5	4	4	3	3	6	6	6	4	3	5	5	5	5	5
Chinandega	7	6	7	8	8	8	8	7	4	4	4	5	6	6	6	6	6	6
Ocotal	9	9	8	7	7	9	9	10	9	10	8	9	9	9	9	9	9	9
Real Madriz	10	10	9	9	9	7	5	8	8	8	9	8	10	10	10	10	10	10
Jalapa	3	7	2	4	5	6	7	6	7	7	7	7	7	7	7	7	8	8

=== Playoffs ===
==== Semi-finals ====
===== First leg =====
22 November 2015

Diriangén	0-0	Real Estelí
None		None

Estadio Cacique Diriangen, Diriamba
Referee: Julio Arbizu

22 November 2015

UNAN Managua	1-0	Walter Ferretti
Jonathan Donado 14'		None

Nicaragua National Football Stadium, Managua
Referee: Oscar Davila

===== Second leg =====
28 November 2015
8:00 pm

Real Esteli	0-1	Diriangén
None		Carlos Torres 32'

Estadio Independencia, Estelí

Diriangen won 1-0 on aggregate.

29 November 2015
7:00 pm

Walter Ferretti	3-3	UNAN Managua
Luis Mendoza 4', Raul Leguias 32', Daniel Cadena 84'		Henry Garcia 5', Luis Fernando Gonzales 47', Jonathan Donado 71'

Nicaragua National Football Stadium, Managua
Referee: Jorge Ojedo

UNAN Managua won 4-3 on aggregate.

==== Finals ====
===== First leg =====
6 December 2015
20:00 (UTC-6)

Diriangén	0-1	UNAN Managua
None		Jonathan Donado 52'

Estadio Cacique Diriangén, Diriamba
Referee: Franklin Jarquin

===== Second leg =====
19 December 2015
TBD

UNAN Managua	2–1	Diriangén
Daniel Reyes 33'; Juan Carlos Rosales 42'		Erick Tellez 58'

Nicaragua National Football Stadium, Managua
Referee: William Reyes
- UNAN Managua won 3-1 on aggregate score.

== List of foreign players in the league ==
This is a list of foreign players in Apertura 2015. The following players:

1. have played at least one apertura game for the respective club.
2. have not been capped for the Nicaragua national football team on any level, independently from the birthplace

A new rule was introduced this year, that clubs can only have five foreign players in a squad.

Jalapa

- (Colombia) Camilo Quiñones
- (Honduras) Erling Ruiz
- (Honduras) Arlis Lizandro Andino
- (Colombia) Andres Garzon
- (Colombia) Jose Luis Rodriguez

Chinandega

- (Colombia) Bryan Cañate
- (Colombia) Erwin Cabrera
- (Honduras) Renán Laín
- (Honduras) Cristian Izaguirre
- (Mexico) Jaime Romo
- (Colombia) Erick Alcázar

Diriangén

- (Argentina) Lucas Martella
- (Argentina) Lucas Carrera
- (Colombia) Andres Giraldo
- (Argentina) Carlos Leonel Torres
- (Argentina) Sergio Arzamendia

Juventus Managua

- (Colombia) Anderson Palacio
- (Colombia) Roland Quintero
- (Honduras) Ronny Colón
- (Honduras) Cesar Salandía
- (Honduras) Rudy Williams

Managua

- (Honduras) Darwing Güity
- (Colombia) Ronny Bello

(player released mid season)

Ocotal

- (Colombia) Jesus Guerrero
- (Colombia) Emiro Manuel Gomez
- (Honduras) Michael Williams
- (Colombia) Jorge Rivas
- (Honduras) Marcos Alfredo Rivera
- (Colombia) Jason Diaz

Real Esteli

- (Brazil) Vinicius De Sousa
- (Colombia) Devis Gutiérrez
- (Brazil) Marcel Cecel
- (Brazil) Leandro Cruz de Oliveira
- (Colombia) Jonathan Mosquera
- (Uruguay) Álvaro Brum

Real Madriz

- (Colombia) Miguel Estrada
- (Honduras) Luis Valladares
- (Colombia) Armando Valdez
- (Colombia) German Arias Ramírez
- (Colombia) Jefreg Javier Olivero

UNAN Managua

- (Colombia) Jonathon Donado
- (Colombia) Rodrigo Rodriguez
- (Colombia) Evaristo González
- (Colombia) Oscar Palomino
- (Colombia) Juan Vidal Congo
- (Colombia) Luis Fernándo Gonzáles

Walter Ferretti

- (Colombia) Eder Munive
- (Uruguay) Rodrigo Valiente
- (Colombia) Marlon Barrios
- (Uruguay) Bernardo Laureiro
- (Brazil) Maycon Santana
- (Uruguay) Gonzalo Ancheta

== Clausura ==
=== Team information ===
Last updated: 2015

=== Personnel and sponsoring (2016 Clausura) ===
Team	Manager	Captain	Kit manufacturer	Shirt sponsor
ART Municipal Jalapa	(El Salvador) Ángel Orellana	TBD	TBD	TBD
Diriangén FC	(Spain) Mario Reig	(Nicaragua) David Solorzano	TBD	TBD
Chinandega FC	(Nicaragua) Reina Espinoza	(Nicaragua)	TBD	
Juventus Managua	(Nicaragua) Douglas Urbina	(Nicaragua) José Alfredo Ramírez	TBD	TBD
Managua F.C.	(Brazil) Flavio Da Silva	TBD	TBD	TBD
Deportivo Ocotal	(Colombia) Javier Reales	(Honduras)	TBD	TBD
Real Madriz	(Honduras) Elvin Roberto Cerna	(Nicaragua) Enoc Salgado	TBD	TBD
Real Esteli F.C.	(Nicaragua) Ramón Otoniel Olivas	(Honduras) (Nicaragua) Elmer Mejia	TBD	TBD
UNAN Managua	(Nicaragua) Edward Urroz	(Nicaragua) Henry Garcia	TBD	UNAN Managua
Walter Ferretti	(Honduras) José Valladares	(Nicaragua) Denis Espinoza	TBD	TBD

== Managerial changes ==
=== Before the season ===
Team	Outgoing manager	Manner of departure	Date of vacancy	Replaced by	Date of appointment
Deportivo Walter Ferretti	(Costa Rica) Marvin Solano	Contract Finished	December 2015	(Honduras) José Valladares	December 2015
Managua F.C.	(Nicaragua) Carlos Zambrana	Sacked	December 2015	(Brazil) Flavio Da Silva	December 2015
Deportivo Ocotal	(Nicaragua) Flavio Vanegas	interim finished	December 2015	(Colombia) Javier Reales	December 2015
Real Madriz	(Nicaragua) Leonidas Rodriguez	interim finished	January 2016	(Honduras) Elvin Roberto Cerna	January 2016
ART Municipal Jalapa	(Nicaragua) Tyson Acevedo	Resigned	January 2016	(El Salvador) Ángel Orellana	January 2016
Diriangén FC	(Colombia) Javier Londono	Resigned	January 2016	(Spain) Mario Reig	January 2016

=== During the season ===
Team	Outgoing manager	Manner of departure	Date of vacancy	Replaced by	Date of appointment
Deportivo Ocotal	(Colombia) Javier Reales	Sacked	February 2016	(El Salvador) Juan Ramon Trejo	February 2016
Diriangén FC	(Spain) Mario Reig	Resigned	February 2016	(El Salvador) Jose Luis Rugamas	February 2016
Real Madriz	(Honduras) Elvin Roberto Cerna	Resigned	April 2016	(Honduras) Sindulio Castellanos	April 2016

=== Regular season ===
The regular season began on 2015. The top four finishers will move on to the next stage of the competition.

=== Scoring ===
- First goal of the season: (Nicaragua) Daniel Reyes for UNAN Managua against Managua F.C., 17 minutes (16 January 2016)
- First goal by a foreign player: (Brazil) Leandro Cruz de Oliveira for Real Esteli against Deportivo Ocotal, 69 minutes (17 January 2016)
- Fastest goal in a match: 3 minute - (Nicaragua) Baez for Real Madriz against Diriangen FC (January 16, 2016)
- Goal scored at the latest point in a match: 87 minutes - (Nicaragua) Daniel Reyes for UNAN Managua against Managua F.C. (16 January 2016)
- First penalty Kick of the season: (Nicaragua) Marlon Lopez for Managua F.C. against UNAN Managua, 75 minutes (15 August 2015)
- Widest winning margin: 5 goals
  - Real Esteli 5–0 Deportivo Ocotal (17 November 2016)
- First hat-trick of the season: (Nicaragua) TBD for TBD against TBD (2016)
- First own goal of the season: (Colombia) Rodriguez Hernandez (UNAN Managua) for Managua F.C. (2016)
- Most goals in a match: 5 Goals Real Esteli 5–0 Deportivo Ocotal (17 November 2016)
- Most goals by one team in a match: 5 Goals
  - Real Esteli 5–0 Deportivo Ocotal (17 November 2016)
- Most goals in one half by one team: 3 Goals Real Esteli 5–0 Deportivo Ocotal (17 November 2016) and ART Municipal Jalapa against Chinandega FC (18 November 2015)
- Most goals scored by losing team: 2 Goals
  - Real Madriz 2–5 Real Esteli (28 February 2016)
- Most goals by one player in a single match: 3 Goals
  - (Nicaragua) Carlos Chavarria for Real Esteli against Real Madriz (28 February 2016)

==== Standings ====
Pos	Team	Pld	W	D	L	GF	GA	GD	Pts	Qualification
1	Real Esteli	18	13	4	1	43	9	+34	43	Semi-finals Group
2	Walter Ferretti	18	7	8	3	27	16	+11	29	Semi-finals Group
3	UNAN Managua	18	7	6	5	24	21	+3	27	Semi-finals Group
4	Diriangén	18	7	4	7	20	19	+1	25	Semi-finals Group
5	Real Madriz	18	7	3	8	25	27	−2	24	
6	Managua	18	6	5	7	21	23	−2	23	
7	Jalapa	18	6	3	9	20	27	−7	21	
8	Ocotal	18	5	5	8	21	32	−11	20	
9	Chinandega	18	3	10	5	19	22	−3	19	
10	Juventus Managua	18	2	6	10	16	40	−24	12	

Updated to match(es) played on 24 April 2016. Source: Soccerway
Rules for classification: 1) points; 2) goal difference; 3) number of goals scored.

==== Results ====
Home \ Away	JAL	CHI	DIR	JUV	MAN	OCO	RES	RMD	UNA	WFE
Jalapa		3–1	0–0	1–0	2–0	0–1	1–5	2–1	0–1	3–2
Chinandega	0–0		1–1	3–1	1–1	1–1	0–0	3–1	1–1	1–1
Diriangén	2–1	1–0		1–1	0–2	2–0	3–2	1–2	0–1	0–1
Juventus Managua	3–3	1–1	0–2		2–2	2–0	0–5	1–0	0–2	1–3
Managua	1–0	0–1	1–3	4–1		2–2	0–2	2–1	2–2	0–1
Ocotal	2–1	4–2	1–2	4–0	0–1		0–5	2–3	0–0	1–0
Real Esteli	3–0	0–0	1–0	3–1	0–0	4–0		1–0	2–0	1–1
Real Madriz	2–1	2–0	1–0	0–0	1–2	4–0	2–5		2–1	1–1
UNAN Managua	1–2	2–1	3–1	5–1	2–1	1–1	1–3	1–1		0–0
Walter Ferretti	2–0	2–2	1–1	1–1	2–0	2–2	0–1	4–1	3–0	

Updated to match(es) played on 24 April 2016. Source:
Legend: Blue = home team win; Yellow = draw; Red = away team win.

==== Positions by round ====
Team ╲ Round	1	2	3	4	5	6	7	8	9	10	11	12	13	14	15	16	17	18
Real Estelí	1	1	1	3	1	1	1	1	1	1	1	1	1	1	1	1	1	1
Managua	4	7	5	5	4	4	3	5	5	6	6	6	7	6	7	6	4	6
Walter Ferretti	7	3	2	1	2	2	2	2	2	2	2	2	2	2	2	2	2	2
UNAN Managua	5	9	9	7	8	8	8	4	3	3	3	4	3	4	3	3	3	3
Diriangén	8	5	4	2	3	3	4	3	4	5	5	3	4	3	4	4	5	4
Juventus Managua	6	2	6	4	6	7	7	7	7	9	8	8	10	10	10	10	10	10
Chinandega	9	8	8	9	9	9	9	9	8	7	9	9	8	9	9	9	9	9
Ocotal	10	10	10	10	10	10	10	10	10	10	10	10	9	8	8	8	7	8
Real Madriz	3	6	7	8	7	6	6	8	6	4	4	5	5	5	6	5	6	5
Jalapa	2	4	3	6	5	5	5	6	9	8	7	7	6	7	5	7	8	7

=== Playoffs ===
==== Semi-finals ====
===== First leg =====
30 April 2016
19:00 (UTC-6)

UNAN Managua	0–2	Walter Ferretti
		87' Laureiro; 91' Dolmus

Nicaragua National Football Stadium, Managua
Referee: Nitzar Sandoval

1 May 2016
15:00 (UTC-6)

Diriangén	1–2	Real Estelí
Parrales 86' (pen.)		10' Galeano; 43' Galeano

Estadio Cacique Diriangen, Diriamba
Referee: Franklin Jarquin

===== Second leg =====
7 May 2016
19:00 (UTC-6)

Real Estelí	6–1	Diriangén
Galeano 8'; Chavarría 10', 62'; Hernandez 12' (o.g.); Téllez 46', 77' (o.g.)		49' Martella

Estadio Independencia, Estelí
Referee: Jorge Ojeda

Real Estelí won 8-2 on aggregate.

8 May 2016
18:00 (UTC-6)

Walter Ferretti	0–1	UNAN Managua
		48' Reyes

Nicaragua National Football Stadium, Managua
Referee: Oscar Davila

Walter Ferretti won 2-1 on aggregate.

==== Finals ====
===== First leg =====
14 May 2016
19:00 (UTC-6)

Walter Ferretti	0–0	Real Estelí

Nicaragua National Football Stadium, Managua
Referee: Jorge Ojeda

===== Second leg =====
21 May 2016
19:00 (UTC-6)

Real Estelí	1–0	Walter Ferretti
Chavarría 9'

Estadio Independencia, Estelí
Referee: Oscar Davila

Real Estelí won 1-0 on aggregate.

== List of foreign players in the league ==
This is a list of foreign players in Clausura 2016. The following players:

1. have played at least one apertura game for the respective club.
2. have not been capped for the Nicaragua national football team on any level, independently from the birthplace

A new rule was introduced this year, that clubs can only have five foreign players in a squad.

Jalapa

- (Honduras) Erling Ruiz
- (Honduras) Arlis Lizandro Andino
- (Honduras) Mario Borja
- (Honduras) Leonel Escoto
- (Honduras) Javier Espinales

Chinandega

- (Colombia) Bryan Cañate
- (Honduras) Renán Lalín
- (Colombia) José Julio Carballo
- (Colombia) Erick Alcázar
- (Colombia) Richard Junior Charris
- (Colombia) Luis Miguel Paterson

Diriangén

- (Argentina) Lucas Martella
- (Brazil) Felipe Cristiano Ferreira
- (Brazil) Rafael Vieira
- (Colombia) Andres Giraldo
- (Spain) Daniel Olcina

Juventus Managua

- (Costa Rica) Andrés Arce Versi
- (Honduras) Cesar Salandía
- (Honduras) Juan José Tablada

Managua

- (Honduras) Darwing Güity
- (Colombia) Ronny Bello
- (Colombia) Juan Muriel
- (Venezuela) Hermes Palomino

(player released mid season)

Ocotal

- (Colombia) Nelsón Maldonado
- (Colombia) Esteban Tapia
- (Panama) Luis Martínez
- (Honduras) Dixon Mauricio
- (Honduras) Marcos Alfredo Rivera
- (Colombia) Jose Sebastian Bedoya

Real Esteli

- (Brazil) Leandro Da Cruz
- (Colombia) Jonathan Mosquera
- (Brazil) David Lazari
- (Brazil) Leonardo Fernandes
- (Brazil) Ricardo Silva de Almeida
- (Brazil) Christiano Da Lima

Real Madriz

- (Honduras) Carlos Alfredo Gonzalez
- (Honduras) Richart Misael Cerna
- (Honduras) Luis Valladares
- (Colombia) Armando Valdèz Caicedo

UNAN Managua

- (Colombia) Jonathan Donado
- (Colombia) Rodrigo Hernandez
- (Colombia) Evaristo González
- (Colombia) Oscar Palomino
- (Colombia) Luis Fernándo González
- (Colombia) John Hernández

Walter Ferretti

- (Uruguay) Rodrigo Valiente
- (Uruguay) Bernardo Laureiro
- (Honduras) Jorge Valentín Bodden
- (Honduras) Mario Girón
- (Honduras) Allan Gutierrez

== Championship playoff ==
=== First leg ===
29 May 2016
19:00 (UTC-6)

Real Estelí	2–0	UNAN Managua
Chavarría 55'; Mejia 83'

Estadio Independencia, Estelí
Referee: Jorge Ojeda

=== Second leg ===
3 June 2016
19:00 (UTC-6)

UNAN Managua	1–1	Real Estelí
Donado 66' (pen.)		80' Chavarría

Nicaragua National Football Stadium, Managua
Referee: Oscar Davila
- Real Estelí won 3–1 on aggregate score.

Primera Division
2016 Champion

13th title

== Aggregate table ==
Pos	Team	Pld	W	D	L	GF	GA	GD	Pts	Qualification or relegation
1	Real Esteli (C)	36	27	6	3	89	18	+71	87	Qualification for 2016–17 CONCACAF Champions League
2	Walter Ferretti	36	19	10	7	64	35	+29	67	
3	UNAN Managua	36	18	10	8	64	41	+23	64	
4	Diriangén	36	16	6	14	48	42	+6	54	
5	Managua	36	10	11	15	51	59	−8	41	
6	Chinandega	36	8	16	12	37	47	−10	40	
7	Juventus Managua	36	9	10	17	48	67	−19	37	
8	Real Madriz	36	10	6	20	48	83	−35	36	
9	Jalapa (R)	36	9	8	19	34	67	−33	35	Relegation play-off
10	Ocotal (R)	36	8	9	19	44	71	−27	33	Relegation to 2016-2017 Segunda División de Fútbol de Nicaragua

Updated to match(es) played on May 2016. Source:
Rules for classification: 1) points; 2) goal difference; 3) number of goals scored.
(C) Champions; (R) Relegated
