= Bismarck Montiel =

Nicaraguan footballer

Personal information
- Full name: Bismarck René Montiel Ávalos
- Date of birth: 5 March 1995 (age 31)
- Place of birth: Managua, Nicaragua
- Height: 1.78 m (5 ft 10 in)
- Positions: Defensive midfielder; defender

Team information
- Current team: UNAN Managua
- Number: 13

Senior career*
Years	Team	Apps	(Gls)
2015–2017	Managua	47	(6)
2017–2018	Juventus Managua	31	(0)
2018–2019	Real Estelí	10	(0)
2019–2020	Diriangén	35	(1)
2020–2021	Junior de Managua	34	(7)
2021–2023	Walter Ferretti	57	(2)
2023–	UNAN Managua	22	(0)

International career^{‡}
2016–	Nicaragua	13	(0)
- * Club domestic league appearances and goals as of 17:33, 8 June 2024 (UTC) ‡ National team caps and goals as of 17:33, 8 June 2024 (UTC)

Bismarck René Montiel Ávalos (born 5 March 1995) is a Nicaraguan footballer who plays as a defensive midfielder for UNAN Managua and the Nicaragua national team.

== International ==
He made his Nicaragua national football team debut on 10 March 2016 in a friendly against El Salvador.

He was selected for the 2017 CONCACAF Gold Cup squad.
