= Eduardo Urroz =

Nicaraguan footballer

Edward Urroz
Personal information
- Full name: Eduardo Migel Urroz Cuadra
- Date of birth: 7 October 1967 (age 59)
- Place of birth: Nicaragua
- Position: Midfielder

Team information
- Current team: UNAN Managua (Manager)

Senior career*
Years	Team	Apps	(Gls)
1983–1992	Diriangén FC		
1992–1996	Juventus Managua		
1997	C.D. Walter Ferretti		
1998	Diriangén FC		

International career
1988–1994	Nicaragua		

Managerial career
- 2012–2014: UNAN Managua
- 2015–: UNAN Managua
- * Club domestic league appearances and goals

Eduardo Miguel Urroz Cuadra (born 7 October 1967) is a Nicaraguan football coach and former player who coaches UNAN Managua in the Primera División de Nicaragua.

== Club career ==
During his career he played for Diriangén, Juventus Managua and Deportivo Walter Ferretti winning titles at each club.

== International career ==
Cruz made his debut for Nicaragua in the 1988 and has represented his country in FIFA World Cup qualification matches.

His final international was a July 1992 FIFA World Cup qualification match against El Salvador.

== Managerial career ==
Urroz took charge of UNAN Managua in 2012 and helping them win promotion to the primea division for the first time in their history.
