= Romer Alegria =

Colombian footballer (born 1992)

Personal information
- Full name: Romer Alexis Alegria Jimenez
- Date of birth: 1 September 1992 (age 34)
- Place of birth: Colombia
- Height: 1.80 m (5 ft 11 in)
- Positions: Left-back; left winger

Team information
- Current team: Real Madriz
- Number: 27

Youth career
- Saipa

Senior career*
Years	Team	Apps	(Gls)
	Pars Jonoubi Jam	15	(0)
2021–2022	Mes Rafsanjan	5	(0)
2022–	Real Madriz	3	(0)
- * Club domestic league appearances and goals

Romer Alexis Alegria Jimenez (born 1 September 1992) is a Colombian professional footballer who plays as a left-back and left winger for Liga Primera club Real Madriz.
