= Vitinho (footballer, born 1989) =

Brazilian footballer

Personal information
- Full name: Victor da Silva Medeiros
- Date of birth: February 20, 1989 (age 37)
- Place of birth: Metropolitano, Brazil
- Height: 1.72 m (5 ft 8 in)
- Position: Striker

Senior career*
| Years | Team | Apps | (Gls) |
| 2010–2011 | Central | 3 | (0) |
| 2011–2015 | Gaz Metan Mediaș | 74 | (9) |
| 2016 | Itumbiara | 1 | (0) |
| 2017 | Real Estelí | 4 | (1) |
| Total | | 82 | (10) |
- * Club domestic league appearances and goals as of 29 May 2017

Victor da Silva Medeiros (born February 20, 1989), commonly known as Vitinho is a Brazilian former football player.

== Career ==
=== Early career ===
Vitinho was born on 20 February 1989 in Metropolitano, Brazil. He began playing senior-level football in 2010 at Série D club Central.

=== Gaz Metan Mediaș ===
His cousin, Eric de Oliveira, convinced him to come to Romania and play for his team, Gaz Metan Mediaș. He made his Liga I debut on 21 October 2011 when coach Cristian Pustai sent him in the 68th minute to replace Mădălin Ciucă in a 3–1 home win over Sportul Studențesc București. On 16 December he scored his first goal in a 1–1 draw against FC Brașov. Until the end of the season, Vitinho scored three more goals in three victories against Voința Sibiu, Pandurii Târgu Jiu and Oțelul Galați. In the same season he scored with a lob the only goal of a 1–0 win over Astra Ploiești II which helped Gaz Metan reach the quarter-finals of the Cupa României, coach Pustai saying after the game:"Vitinho is more slim than Eric, an interesting player who has fit into the team quite well." In the 2012–13 season, Vitinho got injured in the second round, during a game against Pandurii, sidelining him for the rest of the first half of the season. In the second half of the season, he scored two goals in a loss to Oțelul and a draw against Petrolul Ploiești.

In the next season, Vitinho scored two goals, one in a 1–0 home win over Petrolul and the second in a 1–1 draw against FC Brașov in the last round, which helped his side earn the point that saved them from relegation. In July 2014, he again suffered a severe injury against Pandurii, this time in the Cupa Ligii, keeping him off the field for the first half of the season. In the last round of the 2014–15 season, Gaz Metan met FC Brașov again with both sides needing a victory, but the game ended in a 0–0 draw that resulted in the relegation of both teams. That was Vitinho's final Liga I appearance, as he finished his stint in the competition with a total of 65 matches and eight goals. He stayed with Gaz Metan for the first half of the 2015–16 Liga II season, scoring once in nine matches, and then left, but the team managed to gain promotion back to the first league without him.

=== Late career ===
In 2016, Vitinho went back to Brazil, signing with Itumbiara. Then he joined Real Estelí, making his Nicaraguan Primera División debut on 23 March 2017 when coach Otoniel Olivas sent him in the 64th minute to replace Franklin López in a 3–0 victory against Sport Sebaco. On 29 March he scored his first goal, opening the score in a 4–1 win over Nandasmo. That would be his only goal scored in his total of four league appearances, as the team won the title at the end of the season.

== Personal life ==
His cousin, Eric de Oliveira, was also a footballer, and they played together for a while at Gaz Metan Mediaș.

== Honours ==
Gaz Metan Mediaș

- Liga II: 2015–16

Real Estelí

- Nicaraguan Primera División: 2016–17
