= Andres Giraldo =

Colombian footballer (born 1989)

Andrés Giraldo
Personal information
- Date of birth: 7 May 1989 (age 37)
- Place of birth: Palmira, Colombia
- Height: 1.85 m (6 ft 1 in)
- Position: Forward

Team information
- Current team: Diriangén FC

Senior career*
Years	Team	Apps	(Gls)
2007–2008	Deportivo River		
2009–2010	Club Deportivo La Colmena		
2010	Chinandega		
2011	Managua		
2012	Chinandega		
2013–2014	Zakynthos	4	(2)
2015	Juventud Independiente		
2015–	Diriangén FC	19	(7)
- * Club domestic league appearances and goals as of 2016

Andrés Giraldo (born 7 May 1989) is a Colombian footballer who plays as a forward for Diriangén FC.
