= Daniel Reyes (Nicaraguan footballer) =

Nicaraguan footballer

Personal information
- Full name: Daniel Salvador Reyes Avellán
- Date of birth: July 21, 1990 (age 36)
- Place of birth: Diriamba, Nicaragua
- Height: 1.73 m (5 ft 8 in)
- Position: Striker

Senior career*
Years	Team	Apps	(Gls)
2008–2009	Diriangén		
2009–2011	Tigres do Brasil		
2012	Sport Boys		
2012–2013	Diriangén		
2013–2015	Walter Ferretti	67	(15)
2015–2018	UNAN Managua	34	(22)
2018–2019	Diriangén	22	(2)
2019	Moca FC		
2020	Walter Ferretti	5	(0)
2020	Deportivo Ocotal	7	(0)
2021–2022	Juventus Managua	7	(0)

International career
2009–2017	Nicaragua	14	(1)
- * Club domestic league appearances and goals as of 12:00, 28 January 2024 (UTC)

Daniel Salvador Reyes Avellán (born July 21, 1990) is a Nicaraguan footballer who currently plays as a striker.

== Club career ==
He previously played for Brazilian club Tigres do Brasil and joined Peruvian club Sport Boys in January 2012 only to be discarded after playing in a friendly match later that month. After a return to Nicaragua and a spell at hometown club Diriangén, he was snapped up by Walter Ferreti in June 2013.

== International career ==
Reyes made his debut for Nicaragua in a September 2011 FIFA World Cup qualification match against Dominica and has, as of July 2017, earned a total of 14 caps, scoring 1 goal. He has represented his country in 3 FIFA World Cup qualification matches and played at the 2013 Copa Centroamericana. He was a non-playing squad member at the 2009 CONCACAF Gold Cup.

=== International goals ===
Scores and results list Nicaragua's goal tally first.

N.	Date	Venue	Opponent	Score	Result	Competition
1.	11 October 2011	Estadio Rommel Fernández, Panama City, Panama	Panama	1–5	1–5	2014 FIFA World Cup qualification
