= Fernando Araújo (footballer) =

Uruguayan footballer and manager (born 1972)

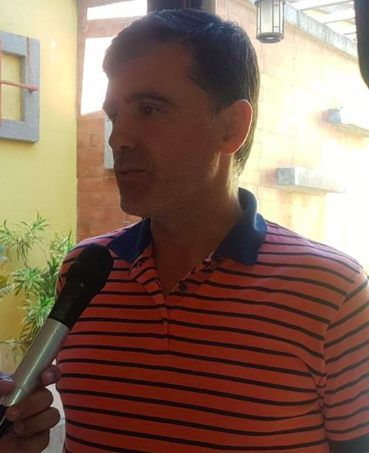

Personal information
- Full name: Washington Fernando Araújo Recarey
- Date of birth: February 23, 1972 (age 54)
- Place of birth: Montevideo, Uruguay
- Position: Defender

Team information
- Current team: Rampla Juniors (manager)

Senior career*
Years	Team	Apps	(Gls)
1997–1998	Rampla Juniors	?	(?)
1998–1999	Almirante Brown	?	(?)
1999–2000	Rampla Juniors	?	(?)
2000–2003	El Tanque	?	(1)
2004–2008	La Luz	?	(2)

Managerial career
- 2011–2012: Rampla Juniors
- 2016: Rampla Juniors (Assistant)
- 2016–2017: Rampla Juniors
- 2018: Real Esteli
- 2019-2020: Vida
- 2020-2021: Honduras Progreso
- 2022: Victoria
- 2023: Platense FC
- 2024: Juticalpa FC
- * Club domestic league appearances and goals

Washington Fernando Araújo Recarey (born February 23, 1972, in Montevideo) is a former Uruguayan footballer who is the current manager of Honduran club Juticalpa FC. He used to play as a defender.
