= Marlon Barrios =

Colombian footballer (born 1986)

Personal information
- Full name: Marlon Rafael Barrios Pérez
- Date of birth: 12 December 1986 (age 39)
- Place of birth: Cartagena, Colombia
- Height: 1.71 m (5 ft 7 in)
- Position: Midfielder

Team information
- Current team: Walter Ferreri

Senior career*
Years	Team	Apps	(Gls)
2009–2011	Real Cartagena	30	(0)
2014–2015	Real Madriz	45	(35)
2015–	Walter Ferreri	10	(1)
- * Club domestic league appearances and goals as of 16 February 2016

Marlon Barrios (born 12 December 1986) is a Colombian footballer who currently plays in Nicaraguan club Walter Ferreri.

== Honours ==
=== Individual ===
- Primera División top goalscorer: 2014 Apertura
