= Estadio Olímpico de San Marcos =

Coordinates: 11°54′23″N 86°12′26″W

Estadio Olimpico de San Marcos is a multi-use stadium in San Marcos, Nicaragua. It is currently used mostly for football matches and is the home stadium to FC San Marcos. The stadium has a seating capacity of 3,000 people.
