= Deportivo Sebaco =

Nicaraguan football club

- Full name: Deportivo Sebaco
- Founded: 2014
- Dissolved: 2018
- Ground: Estadio Municipal “El Colosal” de Sébaco; Sebaco, Nicaragua
- Capacity: 1,000
- Manager: Óscar Castillo
- League: Nicaraguan Primera División
Home colours	Away colours

Deportivo Sebaco was a Nicaraguan football club which last played in the Nicaraguan Primera División. It was based in Sebaco.

== History ==
The club was founded in 2014. In 2016, Deportivo Sebaco won promotion to the Primera Division for the very first time by defeating ART Municipal Jalapa in a promotion relegation playoff.

== Achievements ==
- Segunda División de Nicaragua: 1
  2016 Clausura

== List of coaches ==
- (Nicaragua) Óscar Castillo
