= Bernardo Laureiro =

Uruguayan footballer (born 1992)

Personal information
- Full name: José Bernardo Laureiro Alves
- Date of birth: 2 February 1992 (age 34)
- Place of birth: Melo, Uruguay
- Height: 1.76 m (5 ft 9 in)
- Position: Midfielder

Youth career
- Melo Wanderers
- 2006: Cerro Largo
- 2006–2011: Defensor Sporting

Senior career*
Years	Team	Apps	(Gls)
2011–2012	Defensor Sporting	0	(0)
2011	→ Cerro Largo (loan)	9	(0)
2012	Poços de Caldas	–	(–)
2013	Barnechea	3	(2)
2014–2017	Walter Ferretti	124	(53)
2018	Cerro Largo	3	(0)
2018	Boca Juniors Melo	–	(–)
2019	Melo Wanderers	–	(–)
2019	Boca Juniors Melo	–	(–)
2020–2021	Diriangén	68	(16)
2021	→ Sport Sebaco (loan)	–	(–)
2022–2024	Municipal Jalapa	63	(6)

International career
2007	Uruguay U15		
2009	Uruguay U17	8	(1)
- * Club domestic league appearances and goals

José Bernardo Laureiro Alves (born 2 February 1992), known as Bernardo Laureiro, is an Uruguayan former professional footballer who played as a midfielder.

== Club career ==
As a youth player, Laureiro was with Melo Wanderers and Cerro Largo before joining Defensor Sporting. A member of the Defensor Sporting first team, he was loaned out to Cerro Largo in 2011. After ending his contract with Defensor Sporting, he moved to Brazil and joined Poços de Caldas.

In 2013, Laureiro moved to Chile and signed with Barnechea in the second level.

Back in Uruguay from Nicaraguan club Walter Ferretti, Laureiro played in his homeland for Boca Juniors de Melo and Melo Wanderers from 2018 to 2019.

== International career ==
Laureiro was capped by the Uruguay U-17 national team for the 2009 FIFA U-17 World Cup in Nigeria and for the 2009 South American Under-17 Football Championship where he scored a goal against Venezuela.
