= FC San Francisco Masachapa =

Association football club in Nicaragua

- Full name: Futbol Clube San Francisco Masachapa
- Founded: 2009
- Ground: Estadio; San Rafael del Sur, Nicaragua
- League: Nicaraguan Primera División
Home colours

Futbol Clube San Francisco Masachapa is a Nicaraguan football team currently playing in the Nicaraguan Primera División. They are based in Nandasmo.

== History ==
The club was first founded in 2009 at Diriamba; during this period they were crowned champion of the third division after winning 6–1 on aggregate against Brumas FC de Jinotega.

However, two years later, due to financial trouble, the club moved to San Rafael del Sur with the intention to call themselves the now defunct Masachapa which disappeared in 2004–2005.

However FENIFUT did not allow them and they changed their names to San Francisco Masachapa.

The Club won promotion to the primera division, after winning the promotion/relegation playoff against Deportivo Sebaco 3–2 2017 season and for the first time in the club history.

The club later dropped San Francisco moniker from their name and currently known as Masachapa F.C.

== Current squad ==
As of: 19 January 2025 Note: Flags indicate national team as defined under FIFA eligibility rules; some limited exceptions apply. Players may hold more than one non-FIFA nationality.

No.	Pos.	Nation	Player
—		NCA	TBD (captain)
—		NCA	TBD
—		NCA	TBD
—		NCA	TBD
—		NCA	TBD
—		NCA	TBD
—		NCA	TBD
—		NCA	TBD

No.	Pos.	Nation	Player
—		NCA	TBD
—		NCA	TBD
—		NCA	TBD
—		NCA	TBD
—		NCA	TBD

=== In ===
Note: Flags indicate national team as defined under FIFA eligibility rules; some limited exceptions apply. Players may hold more than one non-FIFA nationality.

No.	Pos.	Nation	Player
—		PER	Guillermo Cárdenas (From TBD)
—		PAN	Yamell Menchaca (From TBD)
—		COL	Brayan Lucumi (From TBD)

No.	Pos.	Nation	Player
—		HON	Christian Durón (From TBD)
—		NCA	TBD (From TBD)
—		NCA	TBD (From TBD)

=== Out ===
Note: Flags indicate national team as defined under FIFA eligibility rules; some limited exceptions apply. Players may hold more than one non-FIFA nationality.

No.	Pos.	Nation	Player
—		NCA	TBD (To TBD)
—		NCA	TBD (To TBD)
—		NCA	TBD (To TBD)

No.	Pos.	Nation	Player
—		NCA	TBD (To TBD)
—		NCA	TBD (To TBD)
—		NCA	TBD (To TBD)

== Achievements ==
- Segunda División de Nicaragua: 1
  2017
- Tercera División de Nicaragua: 1
  2009

== Notable players ==
- (Nicaragua)

== Coaching staff ==
As of January, 2024

Position	Staff
Manager	(Nicaragua) TBD
Assistant Manager	(Nicaragua) TBD
Physical coach	(Nicaragua) TBD
Goalkeeper Coach	(Nicaragua) TBD
Physiotherapist	(Nicaragua) TBD
Team Doctor	(Nicaragua) TBD
Under 20 coach	(Nicaragua) TBD

== List of coaches ==
- (Nicaragua) Jeffry Perez
- (Nicaragua) Ricardo Arévalo
- (Nicaragua) Henry Urbina (December 2023-Present)
- (Nicaragua) Michael Quintanilla (-Present)
