= Sébaco =

- Municipality
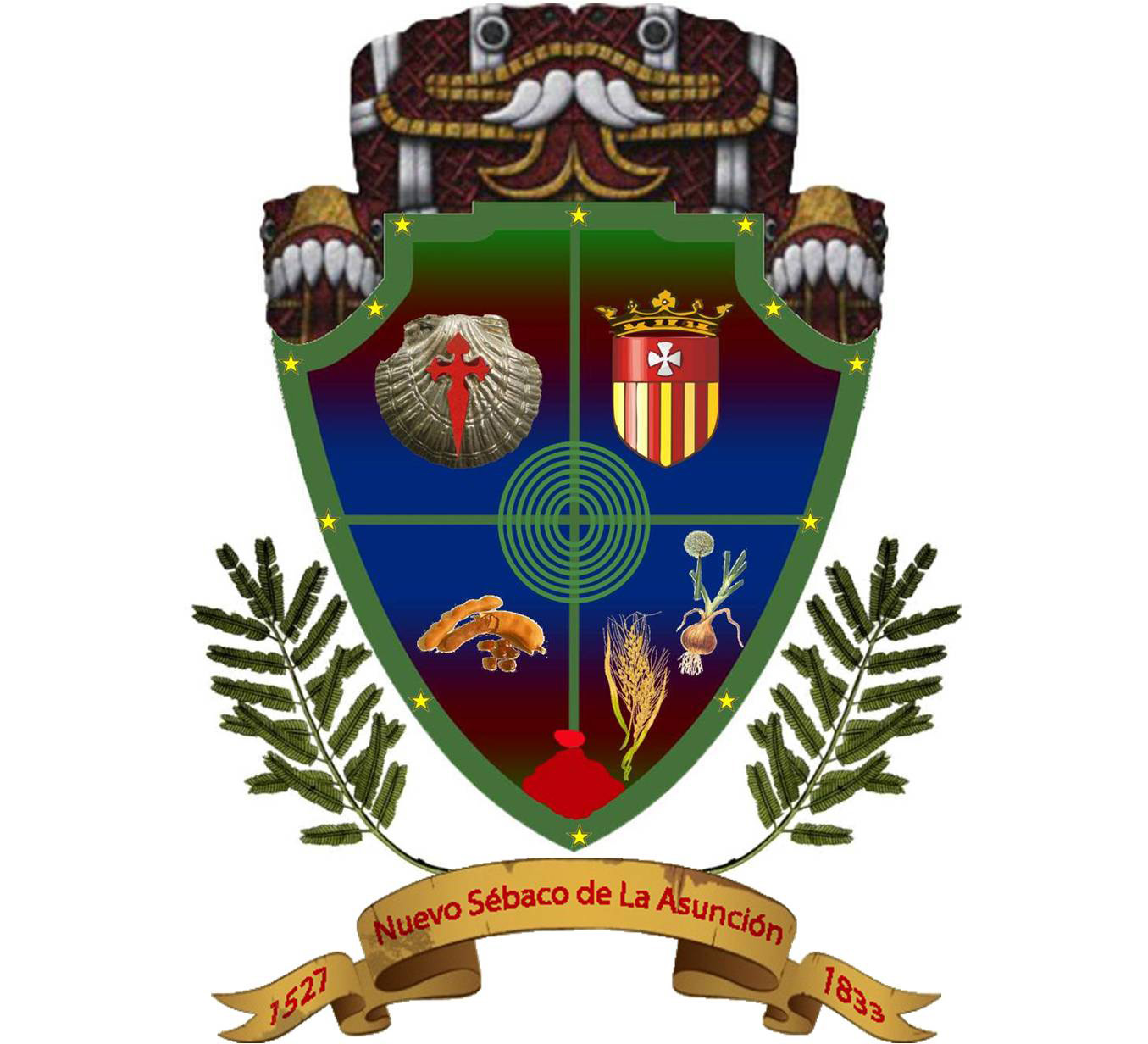
- Seal

- Location in Nicaragua
- Coordinates: 12°51′N 86°06′W
- Country: Nicaragua
- Department: Matagalpa

Government
  - Mayor: Luis Martínez Medal

Area
  - Municipality: 110 sq mi (290 km^{2})

Population (2022 estimate)
  - Municipality: 38,296
  - Density: 340/sq mi (130/km^{2})
  - Urban: 25,763
- Climate: Aw

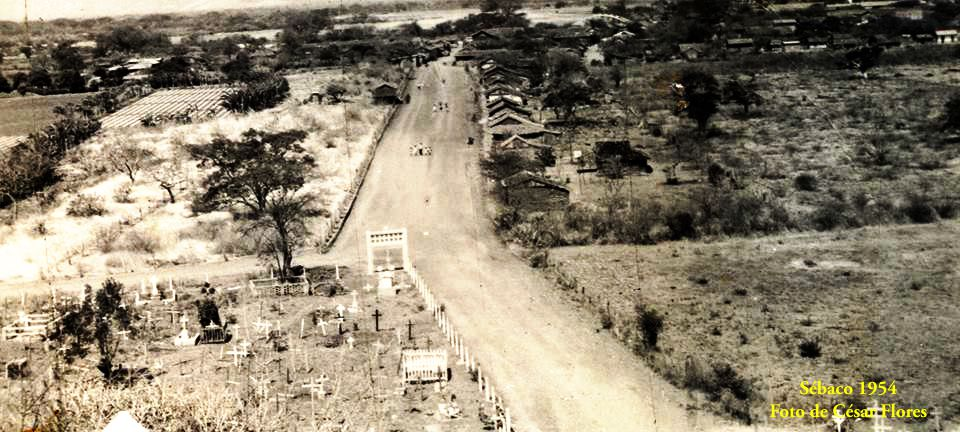
Sébaco in 1954

Sébaco is a town and a municipality in the Matagalpa department of Nicaragua. Situated at the junction of the Pan-American Highway and the Rio Grande de Matagalpa, Sébaco is the largest city of the agricultural Sébaco Valley, one of the most fertile areas in Nicaragua. From Sébaco, vegetable fields extend beyond the horizon when looking west. Five kilometres north of the city, a highway branches east from the Pan-American towards the city of Matagalpa.

King Charles I of Spain named the area "The Very Noble City of Sébaco" by decree. In 2006 the National Assembly of Nicaragua officially named the city Sébaco. The name Sébaco originates from the Nawat language that the Nicarao people spoke who still inhabit the Sébaco Valley. It derives from Siwakuat, which means snake woman. Cihuacoatl was also the Aztec goddess of fertility and agriculture. When the Spanish arrived in the area, they were unable to pronounce the original name of this town, and due to their Tlaxcalan interpreters speaking Nahuatl, it was wrongly documented and over time the pronunciation became Sébaco.

== Limits ==
It is bordered to the north by the municipalities of La Trinidad and Jinotega, to the south by the municipalities of Ciudad Darío and Terrabona, to the east by the municipality of Matagalpa and to the west by the municipality of San Isidro.

== Climate ==
Climate data for Sébaco (1971–1990)
Month	Jan	Feb	Mar	Apr	May	Jun	Jul	Aug	Sep	Oct	Nov	Dec	Year
Mean daily maximum °C (°F)	31.9 (89.4)	33.1 (91.6)	33.1 (91.6)	34.9 (94.8)	34.8 (94.6)	32.9 (91.2)	31.9 (89.4)	33.1 (91.6)	32.4 (90.3)	30.2 (86.4)	30.2 (86.4)	31.5 (88.7)	32.5 (90.5)
Daily mean °C (°F)	24.4 (75.9)	25.1 (77.2)	26.3 (79.3)	27.3 (81.1)	27.2 (81.0)	25.9 (78.6)	25.5 (77.9)	25.7 (78.3)	25.3 (77.5)	25.1 (77.2)	24.7 (76.5)	24.3 (75.7)	25.6 (78.1)
Mean daily minimum °C (°F)	15.6 (60.1)	16.0 (60.8)	17.4 (63.3)	18.9 (66.0)	19.8 (67.6)	19.1 (66.4)	18.6 (65.5)	18.5 (65.3)	18.1 (64.6)	18.0 (64.4)	16.7 (62.1)	15.2 (59.4)	17.7 (63.9)
Average precipitation mm (inches)	4 (0.2)	1 (0.0)	7 (0.3)	19 (0.7)	153 (6.0)	149 (5.9)	61 (2.4)	91 (3.6)	167 (6.6)	106 (4.2)	33 (1.3)	11 (0.4)	802 (31.6)
Average precipitation days (≥ 1 mm)	1	0	1	1	8	11	9	10	12	10	4	1	68
Source: National Oceanic and Atmospheric Administration
