= Nandasmo F.C. =

Nicaraguan football club

- Full name: Nandasmo Futbol Clube
- Ground: Estadio; Nandasmo, Nicaragua
- Manager: Marcos Bodán
- League: Nicaraguan Primera División
Home colours

Nandasmo Futbol Clube is a Nicaraguan football team currently playing in the Nicaraguan Primera División. They are based in Nandasmo.

== History ==
Nandasmo was promoted to the Primera Division after the 2015–2016 season. However, they were immediately relegated after finishing dead last in both the Apertura and Clausura.

== Current squad ==
No.	Position	Nation	Player
1	GK	(Nicaragua) NCA	Franklin Gómez
2	DF	(Nicaragua) NCA	Javier Calero
3	DF	(Nicaragua) NCA	Fernando Lopez
4	DF	(Nicaragua) NCA	Jadier Ticay
5	DF	(Nicaragua) NCA	Luis Méndez
6	MF	(Nicaragua) NCA	Eduardo Pérez
7	MF	(Nicaragua) NCA	Guillermo Jarquin
8	FW	(Nicaragua) NCA	Kairo Ruíz
9	FW	(Nicaragua) NCA	Emerson Quintero
10	MF	(Nicaragua) NCA	Emigdio Arias
11	MF	(Nicaragua) NCA	Jack Tapia
12	MF	(Nicaragua) NCA	Rony Ruíz
13	MF	(Nicaragua) NCA	Alejandro Ruíz
14	FW	(Colombia) COL	Camilo Quiñones
15	FW	(Colombia) COL	Willer Rodriguez
16	MF	(Nicaragua) NCA	Jonathan Lopez
17	MF	(Nicaragua) NCA	Menderson Cano
18	MF	(Nicaragua) NCA	Fabricio Sandoval
19	MF	(Nicaragua) NCA	Emir Medrano
20	FW	(Nicaragua) NCA	Leonardo Arias
21	DF	(Nicaragua) NCA	Julio Martinez
22	GK	(Nicaragua) NCA	Kedler Campos

=== Squad changes 2016 Apertura ===
In:

== Achievements ==
- Segunda División de Nicaragua: 1
  2016

== List of coaches ==
- (Nicaragua) TBD
- (Nicaragua) Marcos Bodán (2016)
