= UNAN Managua =

Association football club in Nicaragua

- Full name: Universidad Nacional Autónoma de Nicaragua – Managua
- Nickname: Los Universitarios
- Founded: 1983
- Ground: Nicaragua National Football Stadium; Managua, Nicaragua
- Capacity: 20,000
- Chairman: Wilber Altamirano
- Manager: Eduardo Urroz
- League: Liga Primera
- 2024–25: TBD
Home colours	Away colours

Universidad Nacional Autónoma de Nicaragua – Managua is a Nicaraguan football team playing in the Primera División de Nicaragua of the Nicaragua football system. It is based in Managua.

== History ==
UNAN Managua was founded in 1983, but did not break into the first division until 1985.

UNAN Managua has spent much of its history struggling to earn promotion to the top flight. Their first serious effort came in 2008–2009, when they earned their way into a relegation playoff against Real Madriz. They lost, 7–2 on aggregate. In 2011–2012, UNAN Managua won the Clausura and earned a promotion playoff with Apertura champion Xilotepelt. Once again, they lost.

However, in 2013–2014, UNAN won the Apertura 2013 title. The Clausura that year was won by Real Esteli's feeder side, which was not eligible for promotion, and so UNAN automatically moved up into the top flight. Their first season, 2014–2015, was a struggle. The club won just eight of 36 top flight matches and was forced into a promotion/relegation playoff with San Marcos. They won, 6–0 on aggregate, but were still not expected to have much of an impact on the table in 2015–2016.

Instead, they stunned Nicaragua by storming to a 3rd-place finish in Apertura 2015, good enough for their first playoff berth. Then, in the postseason, they defeated Walter Ferretti and Diriangén to claim their first national crown. It ended a decade of dominance for Ferretti, Diriangén, and Real Esteli. Although Managua lost the season championship to Clausura winners Real Esteli, their championship was nonetheless a special one.

They spent the next two years as a regular playoff participant, then staved off relegation in 2017 and 2018 seasons before finally succumbing in 2019.

After two years in the Liga de Acenso, UNAN returned to the top division.

== Current squad ==
As of 19 January 2025

Note: Flags indicate national team as defined under FIFA eligibility rules; some limited exceptions apply. Players may hold more than one non-FIFA nationality.

No.	Pos.	Nation	Player
1	GK	NCA	Brandon Mayorga (captain)
2	DF	NCA	Jason Downs
3	DF	CUB	Dario Ramos
4	DF	COL	Jhanz Mina
6	MF	NCA	Jeyser Cisneros
7		NCA	Nahum Peralta
9	FW	NCA	Leslie Sevila
10	FW	NCA	Anderson Treminio (captain)
11	FW	NCA	Rafael Baquedano
13	DF	COL	John Mena
15		NCA	Oscar Soto
16		NCA	Ethan Castaneda
18		NCA	Fabian Lemus
19	DF	NCA	Angel Brenes
21		BRA	Maycon Santana
22		NCA	Adrian Chavarria
25	GK	NCA	Lester Acevedo
35		NCA	Edwin Reyes
40		NCA	Filimon Lopez
42		NCA	Cristian Jimenez
47		NCA	Mario Mendez

No.	Pos.	Nation	Player
5	MF	NCA	Josue Calderon
38		NCA	Danny Mendoza
14	MF	NCA	Dilan Pineda
20	FW	NCA	Brandon Arana
51	MF	NCA	Jeremy Flores

=== Out on loan ===
Note: Flags indicate national team as defined under FIFA eligibility rules; some limited exceptions apply. Players may hold more than one non-FIFA nationality.

No.	Pos.	Nation	Player
—		NCA	Mɪɢᴜᴇʟ Gᴜᴇʀʀᴇʀᴏ (at Managua FC until December 2026)

=== In ===
Note: Flags indicate national team as defined under FIFA eligibility rules; some limited exceptions apply. Players may hold more than one non-FIFA nationality.

No.	Pos.	Nation	Player
—		NCA	Jason Ingram (Loaned From Walter Ferretti)
—		NCA	Roger Gomez (Loaned From Real Esteli)
—		BRA	Vinicius de Souza (From Walter Ferretti)
—		NCA	Nahum Peralta (From Walter Ferretti)

No.	Pos.	Nation	Player
—		NCA	TBD (From TBD)
—		NCA	TBD (From TBD)
—		NCA	TBD (From TBD)

=== Out ===
Note: Flags indicate national team as defined under FIFA eligibility rules; some limited exceptions apply. Players may hold more than one non-FIFA nationality.

No.	Pos.	Nation	Player
—		NCA	Nahum Peralta (To Walter Ferretti)
—		NCA	Marcelo Cruz (To Rancho Santana)
—		BRA	Pedrinho (To FC San Marcos)

No.	Pos.	Nation	Player
—		NCA	Joel Soto (To FC San Marcos)
—		NCA	TBD (To TBD)
—		NCA	TBD (To TBD)

== Honours ==
- Primera División de Nicaragua and predecessors
  - Champions (1): 2015 Apertura
  - Runners-up (0):
- Segunda División de Nicaragua and predecessors
  - Champions (3): 2012 Clausura, 2013 Apertura, Apertura 2020

== List of coaches ==
- (Colombia) Edison Oquendo (2008–2009)
- (Nicaragua) Eduardo Urroz (2012 – October 2014)
- (Colombia) Luis Montano (October 2014 – March 2015)
- (Nicaragua) Julio César Madrigal (March 2015 – June 2015)
- (Nicaragua) Eduardo Urroz (July 2015 – December 2017)
- (Uruguay) Carlos Garabet Avedissian (December 2017 – February 2018)
- (Nicaragua) Luis Vega (February 2018 – December 2018)
- (Nicaragua) Daniel Garcia (January 2019 – December 2021)
- (Nicaragua) Eduardo Urroz (December 2021 – June 2023)
- (Nicaragua) Daniel Garcia (July 2023 – November 2024)
- (Nicaragua) Luis Vega (November 2024 - June 2025)
- (Nicaragua) Oscar Blanco (July 2025 - June 2026)
- (Brazil) Flavio da Silva (June 2026 - present)

=== Notable managers ===
The following managers have won at least one trophy while in charge at UNAM Managua:

Name	Nationality	From	To	Honours
Eduardo Urroz	Nicaragua	1 January 2012; 1 July 2015; 1 December 2021	28 October 2014; 28 December 2017; 28 June 2023	2 Segunda División de Nicaragua (Clausura 2012; Apertura 2013); 1 Primera División de Nicaragua (2015 Apertura)
Daniel García	Nicaragua	1 January 2019; 1 July 2023	28 December 2021; 28 November 2024	1 Segunda División de Nicaragua (Apertura 2020)

== Personnel ==
=== Current technical staff ===
As of June 2026

Position	
Head coach	(Brazil) Flavio da Silva
Assistant coach	(Nicaragua) TBD
Goalkeeping coach	(Nicaragua) TBD
Fitness coach	(Nicaragua) TBD
Under 20 coach	(Nicaragua) TBD
Under 20 Assistant coach	(Nicaragua) TBD
Ladies coach	(Nicaragua) Juan Gomez
Ladies Goalkeeping coach	(Nicaragua) Heyker Caldera
Futsal coach	(Nicaragua) Arvin Espinoza.
Physio	(Nicaragua) TBD
Massagist	(Nicaragua) TBD
Team Doctor	(Nicaragua) Dr.TBD
Utility	TBD

== Women's department ==
The women's team is the most successful team in Nicaragua winning 8 championships, the team is currently led by head coach TBD and features several members of the Nicaragua national team.

=== Honours ===
- Nicaraguan women's football championship: 2004, 2005, 2006, 2007, 2008, 2009, 2011 Apertura, 2012 Clausura, 2013 Apertura
