= Chinandega FC =

Nicaraguan football club

- Full name: Chinandega Futbol Clube
- Nickname: Franja Roja
- Founded: 1975; 50 years ago
- Ground: Estadio Efraín Tijerino Mazariego, Chinandega, Nicaragua
- Capacity: 1,500
- Chairman: Hortensia Morán
- Manager: Wilson Gil Yuste
- League: Liga Primera
- 2015 Apertura: 6th
Home colours	Away colours

Chinandega Futbol Clube is a Nicaraguan football team who play in the Nicaraguan Premier Division.

They play their home games at the Estadio Efraín Tijerino in Chinandega. They have been playing in the top tier since winning promotion in summer 2011.

== Current squad ==
As of: Note: Flags indicate national team as defined under FIFA eligibility rules; some limited exceptions apply. Players may hold more than one non-FIFA nationality.

No.	Pos.	Nation	Player
1		BOL	Xavier Quispe
5		NCA	Roy Durand
2		NCA	Jan Fajardo
7		NCA	Ernesto Toledo

== List of managers ==
Chinandega has had permanent managers since it first appointed TBD as coach in 1976. The longest-serving manager was Reyna Espinoza, who managed Chinandega for four years from Feb 2014 to TBD. Colombian Wilson Gil was the foreign coach in the club. Reyna Espinoza is the first female to coach the men's senior squad.

- (Nicaragua) Salvador Dubois Leiva (2008–09)
- (Nicaragua) Reyna Espinoza Morán (2010–2011)
- (Nicaragua) Vidal Alonso (2011 – Dec 2011)
- (Nicaragua) Luis Olivares (Jan 2012 – Feb 2012)
- (Nicaragua) Reyna Espinoza Morán (Feb 2012 – May 2012)
- (Nicaragua) Adolfo Alejandro Cajina (June 2012 – Feb 2013)
- (Nicaragua) Vidal Alonso (Feb 2013 – August 2013)
- (Nicaragua) Reyna Espinoza Morán (Aug 2013)
- (Colombia) Wilson Gil Yuste (Aug 2013 – Jan 2014)
- (Nicaragua) Reyna Espinoza Morán (Feb 2014–)
- (Argentina) Andrés Novara (2019)
