= Flavio da Silva =

Brazilian footballer and manager (born 1973)

Personal information
- Full name: Flavio Rego da Silva
- Date of birth: June 10, 1973 (age 53)
- Place of birth: Rio de Janeiro, Brazil

Team information
- Current team: Mictlán

Senior career*
Years	Team	Apps	(Gls)
- Botafogo
- Castelo FC
- Maracaibo FC

Managerial career
- –2008: Academia de los Tigres
- 2008–2009: VCP Chinandega
- 2011–2013: Nicaragua national football team (Under 23)
- 2013–2014: Diriangén FC
- 2014–2015: Deportivo Walter Ferretti
- 2015: Pérez Zeledón
- 2016: Managua
- 2016–2018: Deportivo Walter Ferretti
- 2018–2020: Municipal Liberia
- 2019-2022: Diriangen FC
- 2022-2024: Managua
- 2025: Rancho Santana
- 2025-Present: Mictlán
- * Club domestic league appearances and goals

Flavio Rego da Silva (born 10 June 1973) is a former Brazilian football player and current manager of Mictlán.
