= Real Madriz FC =

Association football club in Nicaragua

Real Madriz
- Full name: Real Madriz Fútbol Club
- Nicknames: Los Somoteños; Los Merengues
- Founded: 1996
- Ground: Estadio Solidaridad "Augusto Cesar Mendoza"; Somoto, Madriz, Nicaragua
- Capacity: 3,000
- Chairman: Adolfo Marenco
- Manager: Ronaldo Alvarado
- League: Liga Primera
- 2015 Apertura: 10th
Home colours	Away colours

Real Madriz Fútbol Club is a Nicaraguan football team playing at the top level. It is based in Somoto.

== History ==
On 13 April 2021, the club under Honduran coach Hector Medina reached its first Copa Nicaragua and first top tier league final after defeating Deportivo Jalapa 4–3 on penalties after the game ended 1-1 after extra time. The Copa Nicaragua final on 21 October 2021 saw Real Madriz lose 3-1 to Deportivo Walter Ferretti, with Roris Espinoza scoring the lone goal on 57 minutes. However despite almost winning the Copa Nicaragua, the club was relegated from the primera division.

Real Madriz won 2025 Clausura Liga de Ascenso 3-2 defeating Juventus Managua, this allowed the club to be promoted to the first division after a three years absence.

== Honours ==
- Segunda División de Nicaragua and predecessors
  - Champions (1): Clausura 2025
- Copa de Nicaragua and predecessors
  - Runners-up (1): 2021

== Rivalries ==
=== Clásico de las Segovias ===
The club's nearest neighbour is Deportivo Ocotal, with whom the club shares a fierce rivalry.

== Current squad ==
As of:June 2025 Note: Flags indicate national team as defined under FIFA eligibility rules; some limited exceptions apply. Players may hold more than one non-FIFA nationality.

No.	Pos.	Nation	Player
—		NCA	Kener Pozo
—		NCA	Omar Pozo
—		NCA	Jose Alfaro
—		NCA	Silesky Tellez
—		NCA	Modesto Agurcia
—		SLV	Carlos Enriquez
—		NCA	Roris Espinoza
—		NCA	Daniel Ortega
—		NCA	Cristian Quinto
—		NCA	Axel Hernandez
—		NCA	Aurelio Angulo
—		NCA	Ender Rivas
—		NCA	Jose Espinoza
—		NCA	Enyell Garcia
—		NCA	Carlos Monge
—		NCA	Nerys Miranda

No.	Pos.	Nation	Player
—		NCA	Noe Alfaro

=== In ===
Note: Flags indicate national team as defined under FIFA eligibility rules; some limited exceptions apply. Players may hold more than one non-FIFA nationality.

No.	Pos.	Nation	Player
—		ARG	Abel Mendez (From All Boys Trenel)
—		NCA	Josue Tinoco (From CS Sebaco)
—		ARG	Miguel Pucharella (From CS Sebaco)
—		HON	Edwin Castro (From ART Jalapa)

No.	Pos.	Nation	Player
—		COL	Cesar Vente (From CD Parrillas One)
—		NCA	TBD (From TBD)
—		NCA	TBD (From TBD)

=== Out ===
Note: Flags indicate national team as defined under FIFA eligibility rules; some limited exceptions apply. Players may hold more than one non-FIFA nationality.

No.	Pos.	Nation	Player
—		PAN	Aurelio Angulo (To TBD)
—		NCA	TBD (To TBD)
—		NCA	TBD (To TBD)
—		NCA	TBD (To TBD)
—		NCA	TBD (To TBD)

No.	Pos.	Nation	Player
—		NCA	TBD (To TBD)
—		NCA	TBD (To TBD)
—		NCA	TBD (To TBD)

== Personnel ==
=== Current technical staff ===
As of January, 2026

Position	Staff
Manager	(Costa Rica) Glen Blanco
Assistant Manager	(Argentina) Sergio Cornejo
Physical coach	(Nicaragua) Jaime Izaguirre
Goalkeeper Coach	(Nicaragua) Carlos Matamoros
Physiotherapist	(Nicaragua) TBD
Team Doctor	(Nicaragua) Noel Merlo
Utility	(Nicaragua) Luis Garcia (Nicaragua) Bryan Lopez
Under 20 coach	(Nicaragua) TBD

== List of coaches ==
- (Nicaragua) Mario José Alfaro Mercado (2001–2003)
- (Nicaragua) Léonidas Rodríguez (2004)
- (Nicaragua) Mario José Alfaro Mercado (2005)
- (Honduras) Miguel Ángel Palacios García (2006)
- (Nicaragua) Leonidas Rodríguez (2006–2007)
- (Georgia (country)) Chochua Shalva (რეალმადრიზა) (2008)
- (Honduras) Fredall Murillo (2009)
- (Honduras) Sindulio Adolfo Castellanos (2010–April 2012)
- (El Salvador) Juan Ramón Trejo (August 2011)
- (El Salvador) Ángel Orellana (July 2012– November 2012)
- (Nicaragua) Omar Zambrana (January 2013 – August 2013)
- (Nicaragua) Tyrone Acevedo (September 2013)
- (El Salvador) Angel Orellana (September 2013 – November 2013)
- (El Salvador) Juan Ramón Trejo (December 2013 – February 2014)
- (Nicaragua) Santiago Irias (Interim) (February 2014– February 2014)
- (Colombia) Luís Eduardo Montaño (March 2014 – June 2014)
- (Colombia) Armando Ricardo Hernandez (June 2014– October 2014)
- (Honduras) Mario Cruz (October 2014– February 2015)
- (Nicaragua) Leonidas Rodriguez (February 2015- January 2016)
- (Honduras) Elvin Roberto Cerna (January 2016 - April 2016)
- (Honduras) Sindulio Adolfo Castellanos (April 2016 - June 2017)
- (Mexico) Abraham Zavala (June 2017 - August 2017)
- (Uruguay) Daniel Bartolotta (August 2017 - October 2017)
- (Nicaragua) Tyron Acevedo (October 2017 - June 2018)
- (Nicaragua) Carlos Matamoros (July 2018 -)
- (Nicaragua) Miguel Ángel Sánchez (2018- December 2018)
- (Honduras) Sindulio Adolfo Castellanos (December 2018 - February 2019)
- (Nicaragua) Miguel Ángel Sánchez ( - November 2019)
- (Nicaragua) Carlos Matamoros (November 2019 - December 2019)
- (Panama) Juan Adriel Ramirez (January 2020 - May 2020)
- (Nicaragua) Carlos Matamoros (May 2020 - December 2020)
- (Nicaragua) Ronaldo Alvarado (January 2021 – March 2021)
- (Honduras) Héctor Medina (March 2021 - December 2021)
- (Argentina) Roberto Chanampe (January 2022 - March 2022)
- (Nicaragua) Miguel Ángel Sánchez (March 2022 - TBD)
- (Spain) Kevin Vidaña (June 2024 - 2024)
- (Nicaragua) Jorge Luis Vanegas (October 2024 - September 2025)
- (Costa Rica) Glen Blanco (September 2025 - February 2026)
- (Nicaragua) Carlos Matamoros (February 2026 -March, 2026)
- (El Salvador) Angel Orellana Angel Orellana (March 2026 - Present)
