= Juventus F.C. (Nicaragua) =

Nicaraguan football club

- Full name: Juventus Fútbol Club
- Nickname: Los Pibes
- Founded: 1977
- Ground: Estadio Olímpico del IND Managua
- Capacity: 9,000
- League: Liga Primera
- 2015 Apertura: 5th
Home colours	Away colours

Juventus Fútbol Club, also known as Juventus (not to be confused with Juventus FC), or Juventus Managua, is a Nicaraguan professional football club based in Managua, Nicaragua which currently plays in the Nicaraguan Premier Division.

== History ==
Juventus Managua was founded in 1977, and has been in and out of Nicaragua's first division ever since. Their greatest period of success was in the early 1990s, when they won back to back championships in 1993 and 1994. After that, they spent a long time outside of the First Division, not returning until 2011. Since their return in 2011, the club has been solidly mid-table. They successfully weathered a serious financial crisis in 2014.

== Achievements ==
=== Domestic achievements ===
- Primera División de Nicaragua and predecessors
  - Champions (2): 1993, 1994
- Segunda División de Nicaragua and predecessors
  - Champions (1): 2010−11

== Performance in CONCACAF competitions ==
- CONCACAF Champions' Cup: 4 appearances

Best: first round in 1993, 1995, and 1996
1993: preliminary round
1994: first round
1995: first round
1996: first round

=== Record versus other nations ===
As of 2013-09-13

The Concacaf opponents below = official tournament results: (Plus a sampling of other results)

Opponent	Last meeting	G	W	D	L	F	A	pts	+/-
(Guatemala) Aurora	1994	2	0	0	2	0	9	0	-9
(Panama) Plaza Amador	1993	2	0	0	2	0	9	0	-9
(Panama) Projusa Veragus	1995	2	0	1	1	2	4	1	-2
(Guatemala) Sacachispas	1996	2	0	1	1	3	5	1	-2
Totals									

== List of coaches ==
- (Nicaragua) Salvador Dubois Leiva
- (Colombia) Edison Oquendo (1993–1994)
- (Nicaragua) Douglas Urbina (2009 – Oct 2013)
- (Nicaragua) Oscar Blanco (Oct 2013 – May 2014)
- (Nicaragua) Douglas Urbina (June 2014 – June 2015)
- (Nicaragua) Oscar Blanco (July 2015 – June 2016)
- (Colombia) Javier Londoño (June 2016– June 2017)
- (Mexico) Javier Martínez (June 2017– Dec 2017)
- (Nicaragua) Oscar Blanco (Jan 2018– Feb 2018)
- (Honduras) Héctor Mediana (Feb 2018– June 2018)
- (Argentina) Roberto Chanampe (July 2018 - Dec 2019)
- (Honduras) Héctor Mediana (Dec 2019 - April 2020)
- (Nicaragua) Jaime Ruiz (April 2020 - May 2020)
- (Nicaragua) Oscar Blanco (May 2020 - June 2022)
- (Nicaragua) Alexis Zepeda (June 2022 - TBD)
- (Nicaragua) Rudy Meza (June 2024 - January 2025)
- (Argentina) Roberto Chanampe (February 2025 - June 2025)
- (Nicaragua) Rudy Meza (June 2025 - 2025)
- (Mexico) Javier Martínez (2025 - November 2025)
- (Nicaragua) TBD (2026 - Present)
