= List of foreign Liga Primera players =

This is a list of foreign players in the Primera Division, which began league play in 1933. The following players must meet the following criteria:

1. Have played at least one Primera División game. Players who were signed by Primera División clubs, but only played in lower league, cup and/or international matches, or did not play in any competitive games at all, are not included.
2. Are considered foreign, i.e., outside Nicaragua, if he is not eligible to play for the Nicaragua national team.

More specifically,

- If a player has been capped on international level, the national team is used; if he has been capped by more than one country, the highest level (or the most recent) team is used. These include Nicaragua players with dual citizenship.
- If a player has not been capped on international level, his country of birth is used, except those who were born abroad from Nicaragua parents or moved to Nicaragua at a young age, and those who clearly indicated to have switched his nationality to another nation.

Clubs listed are those the player has played at least one Primera División game for. Seasons listed are those the player has played at least one Primera División game in.

In bold: players who have played at least one Primera División game in the current season (2011–12), and the clubs they've played for. They include players who have subsequently left the club, but do not include current players of a Pro League club who have not played a Primera División game in the current season.

In Italics: Players who have represented their national team

== Naturalized players (Note: Players that have been born abroad, moved to Nicaragua later than the age of twelve, acquired Nicaragua citizenship and waived the opportunity to play for the national teams of their native countries in order to be eligible to play for Nicaragua) ==
- (Colombia) **Erick Alcázar** - Diriangen FC, Chinandega FC, Deportivo Walter Ferretti
- (Spain) **Daniel Cadena** - Deportivo Walter Ferretti
- (Colombia) **Luis Fernando Copete** - Managua F.C., Deportivo Walter Ferretti
- (Honduras) **Mario García** - Managua F.C., Deportivo Walter Ferretti, Diriangen FC
- (Panama) **Raul Leguias** - Real Esteli F.C., Managua F.C., Deportivo Walter Ferretti
- (Honduras) **Elmer Mejia** - Real Esteli F.C.
- (Honduras) **Darwin Ramírez** - VCP Chinandega, Deportivo Ocotal, Deportivo Walter Ferretti, Diriangen FC
- (Mexico) **Manuel Rosas** - Real Esteli F.C.
- (Spain) **Pablo Gállego** - Real Esteli, Managua
- (Uruguay) **Richard Rodriguez** - Real Esteli, Diriangen FC

== Asia – AFC ==
=== India ===
- Ranvir Singh - Diriangen FC

=== Japan ===
- Kazumichi Ikeda - Juventus Managua
- Masashi Kobari - Chinandega F.C., Real Madriz
- Kohei Tomokiyo - FC San Marcos, Deportivo Walter Ferretti

== Africa - CAF ==
=== Equatorial Guinea ===
- Niko Kata - Real Esteli

=== Ghana ===
- Joseph Donko - UNAN Managua

=== Togo ===
- Donouvi Blaise - UNAN Managua

== South America - CONMEBOL ==
=== Argentina ===
- Luis Acuña - Real Esteli
- German Aguirre - Diriangen
- Gabriel Álvarez - Scorpión FC, Diriangen
- Tomas Alvarez - Diriangen
- Jesús Anrique - Deportivo Jalapa
- Ignacio Artola - Real Esteli
- Sergio Arzamendia - Diriangen
- Lucio Barroca - Real Esteli F.C.
- Alfredo Batista - FC San Marcos, Xilotepelt
- Juan Berdún - Real Esteli F.C.
- Pablo Rodrigo Barrios - Masachapa F.C.
- Enzo Brahim - San Francisco Masachapa
- Rodrigo de Brito - Deportivo Sebaco
- Diego Brutto - Diriangen
- Leonel Buter - Diriangen
- Brian Calabrese - Walter Ferretti, Managua, FC San Marcos
- Diego Campos - Diriangen
- Lucas Carrera - Diriangen
- Emanuel Casado - Real Esteli
- Lautaro Ceratto - Real Esteli
- Roberto Armando Chanampe - Diriangen, Chinandega FC
- Tiago Ruiz Díaz - CS Sebaco
- Leandro Figueroa - Walter Ferretti
- **Matias Galvaliz** - Diriangen
- Jonatan Brigatti Gomez - Diriangen FC, Chinandega FC
- **Nazareno Gomez** - Matagalpa FC, Managua
- Mirko Ladrón de Guevara - CS Sebaco
- Néstor Ariel Holweger - Masatepe, FC San Marcos, Deportivo Walter Ferretti, Real Esteli
- Allan Maralles - Juventus Managua
- Lucas Martella - Diriangen
- Allan Marbella Morales - FC San Marcos
- Abel Mendez - Real Esteli, Walter Ferretti, Rancho Santana
- Jose Francisco Molina - Diriangen
- Fabián Monserrat - Real Esteli, Walter Ferretti
- Jorge Moreno - Real Madriz
- Carlos Javier Martino - Masatepe, Scorpión FC, Deportivo Walter Ferretti, Real Madriz, Diriangen FC, FC San Marcos
- Axel Oyeras - Deportivo Sebaco
- Jonathan Pacheco - Diriangen
- Ramiro Peters - Diriangen
- Juan Saraví Platero - Bluefields
- Lucas Piccinini - Masatepe, Deportivo Walter Ferretti
- Miguel Angel Pucharella - Diriangen, CS Sebaco
- Carlos López Quintero - Managua
- Lucas Reynoso - Juventus Managua
- Alvaro Rezzano - Real Esteli
- Franco Rondina - CS Sebaco, Matagalpa FC
- Juan Sánchez - Deportivo Sebaco
- Víctor Hugo Sánchez - Real Esteli
- Luciano Sanhueza - Managua, Walter Ferretti
- Alan Schonfeld - Diriangen
- Dante Segovia - Diriangen
- Hugo Silva - Real Esteli, Diriangen FC, América Managua
- **Matías Steib** - Managua
- Carlos Tórres - Diriangen FC, Walter Ferretti
- Juan Manuel Trejo - Real Esteli
- Ricardo Valenzuela - Diriangen FC
- Federico Vasilchick - Managua
- **Mauro Vernon** - Managua
- **Matias Vernon** - Matagalpa FC
- Juan Vieyra - Real Esteli

=== Bolivia ===
- Fernando Saldías - ART Jalapa

=== Brazil ===
- Jefferson Geraldo De Almeida - Real Esteli
- Rafael De Almeida - Walter Ferretti, Juventus Managua, Matagalpa FC
- Ricardo Silva de Almeida - Real Esteli
- Gyan Araujo - Managua
- Kleber Araujo - VCP Chinandega
- Leandro Barbosa - Managua F.C.
- Rodrigo Bronzatti - Real Esteli
- **Douglas Caé** - Real Esteli, Matagalpa FC
- Marcel Cecel - Real Esteli
- Gabriel Coelho - ART Municipal Jalapa
- Rafael Costa - Real Esteli
- Leandro Da Cruz - Real Esteli
- Clayton Jose da Cunha - Real Esteli, Managua
- Assad Esteves - Real Esteli
- Vitor Faiska - Real Esteli
- Leonardo Fernandes- Real Esteli
- Douglas de Souza Ferreira - Real Esteli
- Felipe Cristiano Ferreira - Diriangén
- Carlos Conceição Junior - Walter Ferretti
- Gabriel Junior - Managua F.C.
- Alan Kardek - Real Esteli
- David Lazari - Real Esteli
- **Cristiano Fernández da Lima** - Managua, Walter Ferretti, Ocotal
- Rodrigo Ludke - VCP Chinandega
- Robinson Luiz - Walter Ferretti, Juventus Managua, Diriangén, UNAM Managua
- Fernando Marques - Real Esteli
- Bruno de Morais - Walter Ferretti
- Leandro Cruz de Oliveira - Real Esteli
- Lucas Oliviera - Managua F.C.
- Luri Oliveira - Real Esteli
- Sidney Pages - Real Esteli
- Pedro Augusto Pedrinho - Walter Ferretti
- Gledson Pereira - UNAN Managua
- Eduardo Praes - Real Esteli
- Jonatas Ribeiro - Real Esteli
- Jonathan Joaelton Sampaio - Real Esteli
- Maycon Santana - Walter Ferretti, Juventus Managua, Real Esteli, Diriangén
- Leandro Teofilo Santos - Real Esteli
- José Vagno Fontes dos Santos - Real Esteli
- **Lucas Dos Santos** - Managua F.C., Juventus Managua
- **Pedro Dos Santos** - Walter Ferretti, Diriangén, UNAN Managua
- Revson Santos - Real Esteli
- Daniel Da Silva - Real Esteli
- David Da Silva - Walter Ferretti
- Denis Da Silva - VCP Chinandega
- **Ewerton da Silva** - Real Esteli, Managua F.C.
- Gabriel Da Silva - Real Esteli
- Jose Pereira da Silva - Juventus Managua
- Thiago Lima da Silva - Managua F.C.
- Leandro Soares - Walter Ferretti
- Vinicius da Souza - Managua F.C., Real Esteli
- Patrick Torelli - Diriangén
- Daniel Venancio - UNAN Managua
- Gabriel Vidal - Managua F.C.
- Rafael Vieira - Diriangén, Juventus Managua
- Vitinho - Real Esteli

=== Chile ===
- **Juan Pablo Abarzúa** - Rancho Santanna FC
- Henry Barrientos - Real Esteli
- Héctor Vega - Juventus Managua

=== Colombia ===
- Sebastian Acosta - Real Esteli F.C.
- Yaidero Alberio - Deportivo Walter Ferretti
- Sebastian Alzáte - UNAM Managua
- Alberto Asprilla - Deportivo Jalapa
- Juan Sebastián Arce - Managua F.C.
- Yubeiquer Arenas - Ocotal
- Diego Arismendi - Ocotal
- Josué Ramírez Asprilla - Real Madriz
- Leyvin Balanta - Real Esteli
- **Paul Barbosa** - Masachapa FC, Rancho Santana FC
- Cristian Ortiz Barraza - Real Madriz
- Marlon Barrios - Real Madriz, Managua F.C., Deportivo Walter Ferretti, Chinandega FC
- Miguel Batalla - Ocotal
- Juan Sebastián Bedoya - Deportivo Ocotal
- Ronny Bello - Managua F.C.
- **Dayrn Benavides** - Rancho Santana FC
- Jorge Betancur - Real Esteli F.C., Juventus Managua
- Deybran Blanco - Juventus Managua
- Arley Bonilla - Real Esteli, Managua
- Cristhian Cabria - Deportivo Ocotal, ART Jalapa
- Erwin Cabrera - Chinandega FC, ART Jalapa
- Ronaldinho Caicedo - Matagalpa FC
- Brayan Cañate - Chinandega FC
- Deiver Canate - Deportivo Walter Ferretti
- **Nester Carabali** - Masachapa FC, Rancho Santana
- José Antonio Julio Carballo - Real Madriz
- Braison Cardonna - CS Sebaco
- **Darwin Carrero** - Managua
- Juan Carvajal - Ocotal
- Jose Luis Cassiani - Real Madriz
- Juan Castaño - Ocotal
- José Ortiz Castillo - Real Esteli F.C.
- Oscar Castillo - Xilotepelt, Managua F.C.
- **David Castrillón** - Juventus Managua, CS Sebaco
- Juan Pablo Chacon - Real Esteli F.C.
- Alex Chandler - Real Esteli F.C.
- Richard Charris - Chinandega FC
- Eder Chaux - Real Esteli F.C.
- Dandy Choles - Ocotal
- Juan Vidal Congo - UNAN Managua
- **Cesar Vente Contenció** - Walter Ferretti
- Andrés Cortobarria - ART Jalapa
- Lancelott Devenish - Deportivo Ocotal
- Jason Diaz - Deportivo Ocotal
- Yeison Díaz - Juventus Managua
- Jonathan Donado - UNAN Managua
- Luis Fernando Escobar - Managua F.C.
- Jose Estrada - Real Madriz
- Miguel Estrada - Diriangen FC, Real Madriz
- Luis Fernando - Real Esteli F.C.
- Javier Gaitán - Parmalat
- Andres Garzon - ART Jalapa, Real Madriz
- Andres Giraldo - Chinandega FC, Diriangen FC, Managua F.C.
- Ezequiel Góngora - Juventus Managua
- Jesus Graizabal - Chinandega FC
- Ronald Granja - CS Sebaco
- Jesus Guerrero - Real Madriz, Deportivo Ocotal, Diriangen FC, UNAN Managua
- Emiro Manuel Gomez - Deportivo Ocotal
- Evaristo González - Deportivo Sebaco, UNAN Managua, Deportivo Ocotal, ART Municipal Jalapa
- Jose Luis Gonzales - ART Jalapa
- Luiz Fernanado Gonzales - Real Esteli F.C., Managua, Juventus Managua, UNAN Managua
- Devis Gutiérrez - Real Esteli F.C.
- Daniel Henao - Juventus Managua
- Carlos Hernandez - Managua
- John Hernández - UNAN Managua
- Rodrigo Hernández - UNAN Managua, Walter Ferretti
- Johan Hurtado - Chinandega FC
- **Marlon Ibarguen** - Masachapa FC, Rancho Santana FC
- Ramón Eloy Iriarte - Real Madriz
- Victor Landazuri - Matagalpa FC
- Bryan Leal - Deportivo Sebaco
- **Fabian Lemus** - UNAN Managua
- Andrés Llano - Diriangen FC
- **Jose Lloreda** - Real Esteli
- **Jerson Lora** - UNAM Managua, Matagalpa FC
- Edwin Lopez - Matagalpa FC
- Kenverlen López - Ocotal
- Esteban Lozada - Chinandega FC
- Brayan Cantillo Lucumi - Ocotal
- Nelson Maldonado - Ocotal
- Luis Marines - Deportivo Jalapa
- Jorge Marin - Diriangen FC
- Juan Marin - Ocotal
- Gabriel Martinez - Real Esteli
- Edwin Mejia - Diriangen FC
- Brandon Mena - Masachapa/San Francisco, Diriangen FC
- Christian Mena - Diriangen FC
- **John Mena** - UNAN Managua
- New Mena - Ocotal
- José Mendoza - Chinandega FC
- **Hans Mina** - UNAN Managua
- Miguel Potes Mina - Diriangen
- Bryan Mojica - Real Madriz
- Miguel Montalvo - Ocotal
- Miguel Morales - CS Sebaco
- Willian Morales - Matagalpa FC
- Jamilton Moreno - Real Madriz
- Carlos Mosquera - Masachapa/San Francisco, Deportivo Las Sabanas, Junior de Managua
- Jhon Mosquera - Diriangen
- Jonathan Mosquera - Real Esteli
- Yeison Mosquera - Walter Ferretti
- Alexander Trimiñio Motta - Ocotal
- Oscar Movil - Real Esteli
- Eder Munive - Walter Ferretti
- Juan David Muriel - Managua F.C.
- **Juan Murillo** - ART Jalapa, Matagalpa FC
- Luis Murillo - UNAN Managua
- Aldair Niño - Ocotal
- Raúl Nomesque - Masachapa/San Francisco
- Kevin Obregón - Juventus Managua
- Jairo Olivares - Chinandega FC
- Jefreg Javier Olivero - Real Madriz
- Cristian Ortega - Nandasmo
- Juan Esteban Ospina - Juventus Managua
- Ronaldo Pabon - ART Municipal Jalapa, CS Sebaco
- Jorge Vargas Palacio - Diriangen FC
- Anderson Palacios - Managua F.C., Juventus Managua
- Oscar Castillo Palomino - UNAN Managua, Managua F.C.
- William Parra - Real Esteli
- David Pinilla - ART Municipal Jalapa
- Freider Mattos Pombo - UNAN Managua
- Jafet Del Portillo - Ocotal, ART Municipal Jalapa
- Carlos Preciado - Real Esteli
- Alexander Quiñonez - Real Madriz
- Camilo Quiñonez - ART Jalapa, Nandasmo, Diriangen FC
- Duver Quinonez - Chinandega FC
- Nicolas Quinonez - Real Madriz
- Ronald Quintero - Real Esteli F.C., Juventus Managua
- Andres Camilo Ramirez - Real Esteli F.C.
- Cristián Ramírez - ART Jalapa
- German Arias Ramirez - Real Madriz
- **Mario Ramirez** - CS Sebaco
- Francisco Ramos - Walter Ferretti
- Jean Rentería - Ocotal
- Gustavo Reyes - Chinandega FC
- Maykel Reyes - Walter Ferretti
- Juan Davis Restrepo - Chinandega FC
- **John Rivas** - Ocotal
- Jorge Rivas - Deportivo Ocotal
- Yosimar Rivera - Deportivo Walter Ferretti, Chinandega FC
- Christian Rodriguez - Chinandega FC
- Juan Camilio Rodriguez - Walter Ferretti
- Jose Luis Rodríguez - Walter Ferretti, Diriangen FC
- Rodrigo Rodriguez - UNAN Managua
- Willer Alexander Rodriguez - Nandasmo
- Pedro de la Rosa - Chinandega FC
- Carlos William Rovira - UNAN Managua
- Johnni Saavedra - Diriangen FC
- Jhesuad Salamanca - Ocotal
- Yilmar Salas - Nandasmo
- **Neider SanJuan** - ART Municipal Jalapa
- Guillermo Sierra - Real Esteli
- Andrés Solarte - Deportivo Sebaco
- Esteban Tapia - Ocotal
- Ornaldo José Torre - Real Madriz
- Ariel Torregrosa - Walter Ferretti
- Alonso Umaña - Chinandega FC
- Ramon Uriarte - Real Madriz
- Juan Diego Uribe - UNAN Managua, Juventus Managua
- Armando Valdez - Managua F.C., Diriangen FC, Real Madriz, Juventus Managua
- Jafeth Kaleth Valencia - Real Madriz
- Jesus Valencia - Real Esteli F.C.
- Luis Vanegas - Matagalpa FC
- Jerney Vente - Ocotal
- Yeiner Marcelo Vivas - ART Municipal Jalapa
- Bryan Viveros - Real Madriz

=== Ecuador ===
- **Jefferson Cabezas** - Rancho Santanna FC
- **Johan Padilla** - Rancho Santanna FC

=== Paraguay ===
- Diego Areco - Managua
- Ever Benítez - UNAN Managua
- Jose Cabañas - Walter Ferretti
- Renzo Carballo - Diriangen
- Ramón Ferreira - Chinandega
- Jorge Darío Florentín - Deportivo Sebaco
- Marcos González - Managua
- Herber Grijalva - Diriangen
- Javier Haedo - Chinandega
- Luis Ibarra - Managua
- Fernando Insaurralde - Juventus Managua
- Francisco Miranda - Managua
- Richard Monges - Walter Ferretti
- Alexander Moreno - Juventus Managua
- Nicolás Morínigo - Real Esteli

=== Peru ===
- Baru - Real Esteli F.C.
- Patrick Alca - Real Esteli F.C.
- Miroslav Cuculiza - Flor de Caña FC
- Eder Ccahua - Deportivo Masaya FC
- Julio Rosales - Juventus Managua FC
- Fabritzio Ruiz - ART Jalapa

=== Uruguay ===
- Fernando Alvez - Real Esteli
- Gonzalo Ancheta - Walter Ferretti
- Sebastián Borba - Real Esteli
- Álvaro Brum - Real Esteli
- Bernardo Laureiro - Walter Ferretti, Diriangen, ART Municipal Jalapa
- Miguel Ángel Lavié - Real Esteli
- Nicolas Martinez - Diriangen
- Federico Moreira - Walter Ferretti
- Adrian Moura - Diriangen
- Gastón Pagan - Real Esteli
- Lucas Rodríguez - Real Esteli
- Mauro Rodríguez - Real Esteli
- Richard Rodríguez - Real Esteli
- Paulo Ortiz - Real Esteli
- Rodrigo Valiente - Real Esteli, Walter Ferretti
- Gabriel Mirazo Villar - Real Esteli
- Javier Vitavar - Real Esteli

=== Venezuela ===
- Miguel Leonardo Sosa González - Deportivo Sebaco, HYH Sebaco
- Yitson Lameda - Deportivo Ocotal
- Edward Morillo - Managua F.C., Real Madriz
- Karim Nasser - Real Madriz
- Hermes Palomino - Managua F.C.
- Genlis Piñero - Managua F.C.

== North & Central America, Caribbean - CONCACAF ==
=== Canada ===
- Joshua Lemus - Diriangen FC
- Saul Tyler Varela Fragoso - Diriangen FC

=== Costa Rica ===
- Kevin Arrieta - Diriangen
- Sebastián Barquero - HYH Sebaco, Matagalpa FC
- Johan Bonilla - Diriangen
- Marco “El Tico” Carrión - Diriangen
- Kenneth Carvajal - Juventus Managua
- Víctor Castro - Diriangen
- Eduardo “El Flaco” Chavarría - Diriangen
- Allan Chavez - Diriangen
- Yeison Esquivel - Diriangen
- Heriberto “La Chamba” Gómez - Diriangen FC
- Bryan Marín - Matagalpa FC
- Alfonso Martínez - Diriangen
- Andrés Mendoza - Diriangen
- Josué Meneses - Diriangen
- Josué Mitchell - Real Esteli
- Jossimar Pemberton - Diriangen
- Wendell Porras - Diriangen
- Alfonso Quesada - Diriangen
- Francisco Rodriguez- Diriangen
- Luis Rodriguez - Diriangen
- Francisco “Chico Mambo” Romero - Diriangen
- Brandon Salazar - Diriangen
- Eduardo Salas - Real Madriz
- Byron Segura - Diriangen
- Gilberth Sequeira - Xilotepelt
- Rodrigo el osito Solano - Diriangen
- Randal Torres - Parmalat
- Oscar Urróz - Managua
- Andrés Arce Versi - Juventus Managua
- Luis Villaforte - Parmalat
- Harold Villalobos - Diriangen

=== Cuba ===
- Rolando Abreu - ART Jalapa
- Jose Armelo - CS Sebaco
- Yordan Castañer - Sebaco
- Marcos Campos - Sebaco
- Sandro Cutino - Managua
- **Alejandro Delgado** - ART Jalapa, Sebaco
- Samoelbis Lopez - Rancho Santanna, Sebaco
- **Ismel Morgado** - Rancho Santanna, Sebaco
- Eugenio Palmero - UNAN Managua
- **Mario Peñalver** - Rancho Santanna, ART Jalapa
- Ricardo Polo - Sebaco
- **Dario Ramos** - UNAN Managua
- **Maykel Reyes** - ART Jalapa, Managua
- Erick Rizo - Ocotal
- Felix Alejandro Rodriguez - ART Jalapa

=== El Salvador ===
- Manuel Alas - Deportivo Jalapa
- René Hernández Alvarez - Real Esteli F.C.
- Dustin Corea - Real Esteli F.C.
- Luis Corea - Real Esteli F.C.
- René Domínguez - Real Esteli F.C.
- Imas Danilo - Deportivo Jalapa
- Alirio Flores - Diriangen FC
- Armando “El Negro” Henríquez - Diriangen FC
- Nahun Martínez - Real Madriz
- Luis Mario “El Mesié” Orellana - Diriangen FC
- Guillermo Ortiz - Diriangen FC
- Miguel Ángel Riquelme - Real Esteli F.C.
- Edwin Samayoa - Chinandega F.C.
- Juan Sanchez - Ocotal
- Jorge Valle - Deportivo Walter Ferretti
- Carlos Zapata - Diriangen FC
- Carlos Zepeda - Diriangen FC

=== Guatemala ===
- Jonathon Angelo Castillo - Juventus Managua
- Franklin Garcia - UNAN Managua
- Kevin Macareño - Real Esteli

=== Honduras ===
- Juan Acevedo - Chinandega FC
- Grodbin Antonio Benítez Aguilar - Real Madriz
- Marel Álvarez - Real Madriz, Managua
- Rolín Álvarez - Ocotal
- Roger Alvarez - Real Esteli, FC San Marcos
- Selvin Alvarez - Real Esteli
- Arlis Andino - Diriangén FC, ART Municipal Jalapa
- Lisandro Andino - Managua
- Magdaleno Andino - Deportivo Jalapa
- Jeffry Araica - Managua
- Héctor Aranda - Real Esteli
- Eduardo Arriola - Real Madriz
- Chimilio Aviles - Real Madriz
- Jorge Balladares - Chinandega FC
- Adin Barahona - Real Madriz
- Christian Batiz - Managua F.C., Ocotal
- Ramon Benedit - Real Madriz
- Jorge Valentín Bodden - Walter Ferretti
- Denier Bonilla - ART Municipal Jalapa
- Mario Borja - ART Jalapa
- Heberth Cabrera - Diriangen FC, Managua F.C., UNAN Managua, Juventus Managua
- Víctor Carrasco - América Managua, Masatepe, FC San Marcos, Xilotepelt, Walter Ferretti, Juventus Managua
- Bryan Castillo - Managua
- Edwin Castillo - Real Madriz
- Victor Castillo - Diriangen
- Edwin Castro - Real Madriz
- **Kevin Castro** - Real Madriz, Managua, Matagalpa FC
- Richart Misael Cerna - Real Madriz
- Grevin Antonio Cerrato - Real Madriz
- Cesar Colon - Real Esteli
- Rony Fabricio Colon - Real Madriz, Juventus Managua
- Henry Coto - Real Madriz
- Jaime Crisanti - Ocotal, Chinandega FC
- Jose Armando Cruz - Walter Ferretti, Juventus Managua, Diriangen
- Marlon Cruz - Ocotal
- Walter Cruz - Managua
- Abel Dominguez - Juventus Managua
- Carlos Daniel Duran - Ocotal
- Leonel Escoto - Diriangen, ART Municipal Jalapa
- Javier Espinales - ART Jalapa
- Cristhian Euseda - Juventus Managua
- Edgard Figueroa - Real Esteli
- Eugenio Dolmo Flores - Real Esteli
- Wilson Flores - Diriangen
- Mario Giron - Walter Ferretti
- Carlos Alfredo Gonzalez - Real Madriz
- Keysi Guerreo - FC San Marcos, Managua
- Darwin Ambrocio Guity - Walter Ferretti, Juventus Managua, Managua
- Allan Gutiérrez - Chinandega FC, Walter Ferretti, UNAN Managua, Ocotal
- Eduardo Hernández - Diriangen
- Jorge Hernandez - Juventus Managua
- Marlon Hernández - Masatepe
- Marlin Bonillas Ibarra - TBD
- Christian Izaguirre - Chinandega FC
- Jonathan Juárez - Real Madriz, Ocotal
- Oscar Lagos - Real Esteli
- Israel Lainez - Juventus Managua
- Renan Lalin - Chinandega FC, UNAN Managua
- Marvin Lamber - Fox Villa
- Josué Lozano - ART Municipal Jalapa
- Victor Lozano - Walter Ferretti
- Byron Maradiaga - Ocotal
- Luis Maradiaga - Ocotal, ART Municipal Jalapa
- Marlon Marcia - Walter Ferretti
- Gerson Martinez - Diriangen
- Jorge Martínez - América Managua, Walter Ferretti
- Dixon Mauricio - Ocotal
- Allan Medina - ART Municipal Jalapa, Ocotal
- Ricardo Medina - Ocotal
- Alejandro Mejía - Masatepe, FC San Marcos, Walter Ferretti
- Howall Mejia - Diriangen
- Jose Javier Mejia - Deportivo Ocotal
- Pedro Melendez - Real Madriz
- Julio Cesar Molina - Ocotal
- Víctor Norales - Managua F.C., Real Madriz, Chinandega FC
- Gabriel Ortiz - Ocotal
- José Luis Palacios - Real Madriz
- Samuel Padilla - Deportivo Jalapa, Masatepe, Walter Ferretti, Chinandega FC, Parmalat
- Santiago Paredes - Real Madriz
- Jarel Puerto - Chinandega FC
- Ever Rodríguez - Masachapa/San Francisco
- Alfredo Oscar Rosales - ART Municipal Jalapa
- Marcos Rivera - Ocotal
- Erlyn Ruíz - Ocotal, ART Jalapa, Real Madriz
- Misael Ruíz - Ocotal
- Cesar Salandia - Masatepe, FC San Marcos, Walter Ferretti, Ocotal, Juventus Managua
- Byron Jose Sauceda - América Managua
- Erick Sierra - Ocotal, Managua
- Jairo Sosa - Real Madriz
- Jonathan Suárez - Deportivo Ocotal
- Channel Suazo - Real Esteli, ART Municipal Jalapa
- Juan Jose Tablada - Real Esteli, Managua, Ocotal, Juventus Managua, ART Municipal Jalapa
- Jorge Valladares - Ocotal
- José Francisco Valladares - Ocotal
- Luis Valladares - Walter Ferretti, Real Madriz
- Nerlin Vallejos - Ocotal
- Allans Vargas - Real Esteli
- Ángel Velásquez - Managua
- Michael Williams - Ocotal, UNAN Managua
- Mitchel Williams - Walter Ferretti
- Rudy Williams - Juventus Managua
- Bryan Zuninga - ART Municipal Jalapa, HYH Sebaco

=== Jamaica ===
- Dennis Thompson - Diriangen

=== Mexico ===
- Gerardo Aguilar - Real Esteli F.C.
- Bernard Amaya - América Managua
- Jesús Anrriquez - Deportivo Jalapa
- Ernesto Benítez - Masachapa/San Francisco
- Luis Carbajal - Junior de Managua
- Victor Adrian Cardoso - Xilotepelt, Flor de Caña
- Diego Casas - Walter Ferretti
- Mauricio Castañeda - Real Madriz
- Carlos Castro - Walter Ferretti
- Edson Contreras - Junior de Managua
- Fidel Cortés - Deportivo Jalapa
- Diego de la Cruz - Juventus Managua
- Giovanni Cuella - Deportivo Jalapa
- Rogelio Espinoza - Junior de Managua
- Carlos Félix - Juventus Managua
- José Antonio Flores - Real Esteli, Managua
- Carlos Felix Gámez - Managua F.C., Juventus Managua
- Alberto Garcia - Fox Villa
- Eder García - ART Jalapa
- Nahúm Gómez - Real Esteli
- Daniel González - ART Jalapa
- Bernardo Gradilla - Diriangen, Juventus Managua
- Marco Granados - Real Esteli
- Taufic Guarch - Walter Ferretti, Diriangen, Managua, Matagalpa FC
- Edgard Hernández - Deportivo Ocotal, ART Jalapa
- Jesús Leal - Real Esteli
- Emilio López- Real Esteli F.C.
- Juan Carlos López - Real Esteli F.C.
- Edder Mondragón - Real Madriz, ART Jalapa
- Yilberto Morales - Deportivo Jalapa, Diriangen F.C.
- Segio Napoles - Walter Ferretti
- Ivan Ochoa - Real Esteli F.C.
- Ramon Pedrozo - Real Madriz, FC San Marcos
- Jaime Romo - - Xilotepelt, Chinandega FC, Fox Villa
- Eduardo Rosas - Deportivo Ocotal
- Roel Salinas - Fox Villa
- **Jorge Sanchez** - Real Esteli F.C.
- Julio Sotelo - América Managua
- Israel Taboada - Deportivo Jalapa
- Carlos Torres - Diriangen
- Gregorio Torres - Real Esteli F.C.
- Carlo Vasquez - Managua
- Fernando Villalpando - Walter Ferretti
- Hugo Zambrano - Fox Villa

=== Panama ===
- Mauro Allen - FC San Marcos, Deportivo Ocotal
- Aurelio Angulo - Real Madriz
- **Luis Canate** - Walter Ferretti
- Sergio Cunningham - UNAN Managua, Real Esteli
- Jeremmy Downe - real Madriz
- Rodolfo Forbes - Managua, Matagalpa FC
- **Omar Hinestroza** - Walter Ferretti
- Samuel Kerr - Chinandega FC
- Moises Leguias - América Managua, Juventus Managua, FC San Marcos
- Gerardo Negrete - Deportivo Ocotal
- Luis Martínez Rangel - UNAN Managua, Deportivo Ocotal
- Rogelio Robinson - Matagalpa FC
- Julio Pastor Ruiz - Real Madriz
- Álvaro Salazar - Xilotepelt
- Carlos Small - Managua
- Luis Sinclair - Chinandega FC
- George Tingline - Chinandega FC, UNAN Managua

=== United States ===
- Arturo Barragan - Diriangen FC

== Europe - UEFA ==
=== Italy ===
- Giacomo Ratto - UNAN Managua

=== Netherlands ===
- Isacq De Leeuw - Rancho Santana

=== Russia ===
- Nikita Sodlochenko - Deportivo Walter Ferretti

=== Spain ===
- Francisco Perez Baho - Real Estel
- Arán Pazos Balado - Managua
- Alberto Heredia Ceballos - Real Esteli F.C.
- Santiago Otero Diaz - Real Estel
- Alex Expósito - Diriangén FC
- Bidari Garcia - Real Estel
- Diego Pelaez - Managua
- Alex Piache - Fox Villa
- Daniel Olcina - Diriangén FC

=== Sweden ===
- Niclas Elving - Deportivo Walter Ferretti
- Jonas Matersson - Real Esteli F.C.
