= 2025–26 Liga Primera =

Liga Primera
- Season: 2025–26
- Champions: Diriangén (Apertura); Real Esteli (Clausura)
- Relegated: Real Madriz
- CONCACAF Central American Cup: Diriangén
- CONCACAF Central American Cup: Real Esteli
- Top goalscorer: Apertura: (Costa Rica) José Montiel (11 goals); Clausura: (Argentina) Emanuel Casado (10 goals)
- Biggest home win: Apertura: TBD 6–0 TBD
- Biggest away win: Apertura: TBD 3-4 TBD (3 November 2024)
- Highest scoring: Apertura: TBD 4-4 TBD (5 October 2024)
- All statistics correct as of 7 November 2024.

The 2025–26 Liga Primera de Nicaragua football season was to be divided into two tournaments, Apertura and Clausura. The season will determine the 81st and 82nd champions in the history of the Liga Primera de Nicaragua, the top division of football in Nicaragua. The Apertura tournament is to be played in the second half of 2025, while the Clausura is to be played in the first half of 2026.

== Teams ==
=== Team information ===
A total of ten teams contested the league, including nine sides from the 2024–25 Primera División, and one side from the 2024–25 Segunda División.

Ocotal finished last in the aggregate table and were relegated to the Segunda División. The champions from the Segunda División, Real Madriz, were promoted in their place.

The 9th place team in the aggregate table, Rancho Santana FC, faced the second-place team from the Segunda División, Rio Blanco, in a playoff for a spot in the Primera División. Rancho Santana FC won 2–1 over two legs, meaning they remained in the Primera División.

=== Promotion and relegation ===
Promoted from Segunda División as of June, 2025.

- Champions: Real Madriz

Relegated to Segunda División as of June, 2025.

- Last Place: Ocotal

=== Personnel and kits ===
Team	Chairman	Head coach	Captain	Kit manufacturer	Shirt sponsor(s)
ART Jalapa	TBD	(Colombia) Jairo Basabe	(Nicaragua) TBD	Huriver	Ferreter Lenar, Noelito
Diriangén	TBD	(Argentina) Jose Giacone	(Nicaragua) TBD	Macron	Credifacil, Doradobet, Claro, Proplisa
CS Sebaco	TBD	(Nicaragua) Sergio Ivan rodriguez	(Nicaragua) TBD	La Cabra Sport	Cafe OX, Siles, Transporte Tovel
Managua	TBD	(Nicaragua) Emilio Aburto	(Nicaragua) TBD	Orion Elite	Claro, Chevron, Fetesa
Matagalpa FC	TBD	(Honduras) Héctor Medina	(Brazil) Robinson Luiz	El Brother	Standard Chontal; Central Gas; Segruidad Aguila; La Bodeguita; Distarija
Rancho Santana FC	TBD	(Argentina) Alexis Santana	(Ecuador) Johan Padilla	Mi Ropa Favorita.com	Miropa Favorito.com, BlackSwan
Real Esteli	TBD	(Nicaragua) Otoniel Olivas	(Nicaragua) TBD	Orion Elite	Tigo, Cafe Ox, Baterias KOBE,
Real Madriz	TBD	(Nicaragua) Jorge Vanegas	(Nicaragua) Ender Rivas	La Cabra Sport	Liver Hotels, Alacadia Municipal Somoto Nadriz,
UNAN Managua	TBD	(Nicaragua) Oscar Blanco	(Nicaragua) TBD	Joma	Universided de Managua
Walter Ferretti	TBD	(Nicaragua) Sting Lopez	(Nicaragua) TBD	La Cabra Sport	Claro; Nica Logistics; INiser

== Managerial Changes ==
=== Before the start of the season ===
Team	Outgoing manager	Manner of departure	Date of vacancy	Replaced by	Date of appointment	Position in table
Walter Ferretti	(Nicaragua) Mauricio Cruz	Mutual Consent	May, 2025	(Nicaragua) Sting Lopez	May, 2025	th (2025 Clausura)
UNAN Managua	(Nicaragua) Luis Vega	Resigned due to health reason	June, 2025	(Nicaragua) Oscar Blanco	July, 2025	
Rancho Santana	(Argentina) Cristian Taberna	End of interimship	July, 2024	(Argentina) Alexis Sanchez	July, 2024	th (2025 Clausura)

=== During the Apertura season ===
Team	Outgoing manager	Manner of departure	Date of vacancy	Replaced by	Date of appointment	Position in table
ART Jalapa	(Colombia) Jairo Basabe	Resigned	August, 2025	(Nicaragua) Danny Rosales (Interim)	August, 2025	th (2024 Apertura)
Rancho Santana	(Argentina) Alexis Sanchez	Sacked	August 2025	(Brazil) Flavio da Silva	August 2025	9th (2025 Apertura)
ART Jalapa	(Argentina) Danny Rosales	Interimship ended	September 2025	(Colombia) Luis Javier Londoño	September 2025	9th (2025 Apertura)
Rancho Santana	(Brazil) Flavio da Silva	Mutual Consent	September 2025	(Nicaragua) Mauricio Cruz	September 2025	9th (2025 Apertura)
Real Madriz	(Nicaragua) Jorge Luis Vanegas	Sacked	September 2025	(Costa Rica) Glen Blanco	September 2025	th (2025 Apertura)
Matagalpa FC	(Honduras) Hector Medina	Mutual Consent	October 2025	(Argentina) Roberto Chanampe	October 2025	th (2025 Apertura)

=== Between the Apertura and Clausura season ===
Team	Outgoing manager	Manner of departure	Date of vacancy	Replaced by	Date of appointment	Position in table
Real Estelí	(Nicaragua) Ramón Otoniel Olivas	Mutual Consent	December, 2025	(Argentina) Diego Vásquez	December, 2025	th (2025 Apertura)
Diriangén FC	(Argentina) José Giacone	Contract Finished	December, 2025	(Costa Rica) Alexander Vargas	December, 2025	th (2025 Apertura)

=== During the Clausura season ===
Team	Outgoing manager	Manner of departure	Date of vacancy	Replaced by	Date of appointment	Position in table
Real Madriz	(Costa Rica) Glen Blanco	Sacked	February, 2026	(Nicaragua) Carlos Matamoros	February, 2026	10th (2026 Clausura)
Rancho Santana	(Nicaragua) Mauricio Cruz	Sacked	March 5, 2026	(Costa Rica) Kenneth Barrantes	March 6, 2026	8th (2026 Clausura)
Real Madriz	(Nicaragua) Carlos Matamoros	Sacked	March, 2026	(El Salvador) Angel Orellana	March, 2026	10th (2026 Clausura)

== Apertura 2025 ==
=== Standings ===
Pos	Team	Pld	W	D	L	GF	GA	GD	Pts	Qualification
1	Diriangén	18	10	6	2	48	15	+33	36	Advance to Playoffs semi-finals
2	Managua	18	11	3	4	32	13	+19	36	Advance to Playoffs semi-finals
3	Real Estelí	18	9	6	3	26	14	+12	33	Advance to Playoffs quarter-finals
4	Club Sébaco	18	9	3	6	30	29	+1	30	Advance to Playoffs quarter-finals
5	Matagalpa	18	8	4	6	29	26	+3	28	Advance to Playoffs quarter-finals
6	Walter Ferretti	18	7	5	6	31	26	+5	26	Advance to Playoffs quarter-finals
7	Municipal Jalapa	18	7	3	8	33	33	0	24	
8	Rancho Santana	18	5	2	11	17	47	−30	17	
9	UNAN Managua	18	3	3	12	20	41	−21	12	
10	Real Madriz	18	3	1	14	16	38	−22	10	

Rules for classification: 1) points; 2) goal difference; 3) number of goals scored; 4) head-to-head points; 5) head-to-head goal difference; 6) head-to-head goals scored; 7) draw.

=== Playoffs ===
==== Quarterfinals ====
November 28, 2025

Real Esteli	2-1	Deportivo Walter Ferretti
Josué Mitchell 30'; Ronaldo Espinoza 97'		Henry Niño 115'

Estadio Independencia, Esteli

Real Esteli progressed.

November 28, 2025

Club Sébaco	2-0	Matagalpa
William Palacios 47' 60'		Nil

Estadio

Sebaco progressed.

==== Semi-finals ====
Team 1	Agg.	Team 2	1st leg	2nd leg
Diriangen	6-0	Club Sébaco	1-0	5-0
Managua	5-2	Real Esteli	4-1	1-1

===== First leg =====
30 November 2025

Club Sébaco	0-1	Diriangen
Nil		Junior Arteaga 93'

Estadio Nacional, Managua
Referee: Ricardo Mendoza

1 December 2025
17:00

Real Esteli	0-2	Managua
Nil		Carlos Hernandez 80'; Mauro Verón 98'

Stadio Independencia
Referee: Félix Mojica

===== Second leg =====
7 December, 2025
TBD

Diriangen	5-0	Club Sébaco
Junio Arteaga 39' 55' 62'; Germán Aguirre 50'; Luis Coronel 77'		Nil

Estadio Cacique Diriangén
Referee: Roger Meléndez

Diriangen won on 6-0 aggregate.

7 December 2025
TBD

Managua	0-2	Real Esteli
Nil		Byron Bonilla 17'; Bancy Hernández 43'

Estadio Nacional
Referee: Nitzar Sandoval

2-2 aggregate. Managua won 5-4 on penalties.

==== Final ====
===== First leg =====
14 December 2025
TBD

Managua	0-0	Diriangen
Nil		Nil

Estadio Nacional de Fútbol de Nicaragua
Referee: Ricardo Mendoza

===== Second leg =====
21 December 2025
TBD

Diriangen	1-0	Managua
Germán Aguirre 35'		Nil

Estadio Cacique Diriangén
Referee: Roger Meléndez

Diriangen won 1-0 on aggregate.

Apertura 2025 champions

34th title

== Clausura 2026 ==
=== Standings ===
Pos	Team	Pld	W	D	L	GF	GA	GD	Pts	Qualification
1	Diriangén	18	12	3	3	40	19	+21	39	Advance to Playoffs semi-finals
2	Real Estelí	18	11	4	3	41	19	+22	37	Advance to Playoffs semi-finals
3	Municipal Jalapa	18	9	6	3	29	16	+13	33	Advance to Playoffs quarter-finals
4	Managua	18	8	5	5	22	18	+4	29	Advance to Playoffs quarter-finals
5	Matagalpa	18	5	7	6	30	24	+6	22	Advance to Playoffs quarter-finals
6	Walter Ferretti	18	5	6	7	18	28	−10	21	Advance to Playoffs quarter-finals
7	Club Sébaco	18	6	2	10	23	24	−1	20	
8	UNAN Managua	18	4	4	10	21	34	−13	16	
9	Rancho Santana	18	4	4	10	20	43	−23	16	
10	Real Madriz	18	4	3	11	14	33	−19	15	

Rules for classification: 1) points; 2) goal difference; 3) number of goals scored; 4) head-to-head points; 5) head-to-head goal difference; 6) head-to-head goals scored; 7) draw.

=== Playoffs ===
==== Quarterfinals ====
April 30, 2026

Managua	2-4	Matagalpa
Juan Medrano 70'; Carlos Small 74'		Nazareno Gómez 30' 87'; Robinson Luiz da Silva 73'; Lesnar Davila 91'

Matagalpa progressed.

April 30, 2026

ART Municipal Jalapa	3-0	Deportivo Walter Ferretti
Oscar Villalobos 53'; Kleyver Gonzalez 64'; Bayron Salinas 73'		Nil

Estadio

Municipal Jalapa progressed.

==== Semi-finals ====
Team 1	Agg.	Team 2	1st leg	2nd leg
Diriangen	4-1	Matagalpa	1-0	3-1
Real Esteli	3-1	ART Municipal Jalapa	0-0	3-1

===== First leg =====
May 3, 2026

Matagalpa	0-1	Diriangen
Nil		Jonathan Moncada 51'

May 3, 2026

ART Municipal Jalapa	0-0	Real Esteli
Nil		Nil

===== Second leg =====
May 7, 2026
TBD

Diriangen	3-1	Matagalpa
Josimar Pemberton 45'; Jonathan Moncada 57'; Matías Galvaliz 69'		Nazareno Gómez 79'

Estadio Cacique Diriangén

Diriangen won on 4-1 aggregate.

May 7, 2026
TBD

Real Esteli	3-1	ART Municipal Jalapa
Joab Gutiérrez 3'; Emanuel Casado 5'; Nicolas Morinigo 95'		Oscar Villalobos 32'

Estadio

Real Esteli won 3-1 on aggregate.

==== Final ====
===== First leg =====
May 9, 2026

Real Esteli	1-1	Diriangen
Emanuel Casado 21'		Josimar Pemberton 44'

Estadio Independencia (Nicaragua)
Referee: Roger Melendez

===== Second leg =====
May 16, 2026

Diriangen	1-1	Real Esteli
Germán Aguirre 35'		Juan Barrera 79'

Nicaragua National Football Stadium
Referee: Roger Meléndez

2-2. Real Esteli won 5-4 on penalties.

Clausura 2026 champions

34th title

== List of foreign players ==
This is a list of foreign players in the 2025–26 season. The following players:

1. Have played at least one game for the respective club.
2. Have not been capped for the Nicaragua national football team on any level, independently from the birthplace

A new rule was introduced this season, that clubs can have four foreign players per club and can only add a new player if there is an injury or a player/s is released, and it is before the closing of the season transfer window.

ART Jalapa

- (Bolivia) Fernando Saldías
- (Colombia) Cristián Ramírez
- (Cuba) Alejandro Delgado
- (Cuba) Ismel Morgado
- (Honduras) Óscar Alfredo Rosales

Diriangén

- (Argentina) Matías Galvaliz
- (Argentina) German Gabriel Aguirre
- (Argentina) Alan Schonfeld
- (Argentina) Francisco Molina
- (Costa Rica) Víctor Castro
- (Colombia) Andrés Llano
- (Paraguay) Renzo Carballo

CS Sebaco

- (Argentina) Tiago Ruiz Díaz
- (Colombia) Mario Ramirez
- (Cuba) Marcos Campos
- (Cuba) Samoelbis Lopez
- (Cuba) Yordan Castañer
- (Cuba) Ricardo Polo
- (Argentina) Mirko Ladrón de Guevara

Managua

- (Argentina) Matías Steib
- (Argentina) Mauro Verón
- (Argentina) Lucas Carrizo
- (Cuba) Maykel Reyes
- (Colombia) Darwin Carrero
- (Colombia) Carlos Hernandez
- (Panama) Carlos Small

Matagalpa FC

- (Argentina) Franco Rondina (*)
- (Argentina) Matias Vernon
- (Brazil) Robinson Luiz
- (Honduras) Kevin Castro
- (Colombia) Jerson Lora

Real Madriz

- (Honduras) Henry Coto
- (Honduras) Eduardo Arriola
- (Panama) Jeremmy Downe
- (Panama) Aurelio Angulo

Rancho Santana FC

- (Ecuador) Johan Padilla
- (Ecuador) Brando Villacis
- (Colombia) Dayrn Benavides
- (Colombia) Wil Robledo
- (Netherlands) Isacq De Leeuw
- (Mexico) Taufic Guarch
- (Argentina) Abel Mendez

Real Estelí

- (Argentina) Emanuel Casado
- (Costa Rica) Josué Mitchell
- (Colombia) William Parra
- (Colombia) Carlos Preciado
- (Honduras) Héctor Aranda
- (Paraguay) Nicolás Morínigo
- (Honduras) Allans Vargas
- (Mexico) Nahúm Gómez

UNAN Managua

- (Colombia) Fabian Lemus
- (Cuba) Dario Ramos
- (Colombia) Jhans Mina
- (Colombia) Jhon Mena

Walter Ferretti

- (Panama) Omar Hinestroza
- (Panama) Luis Canate
- (Uruguay) Federico Moreira
- (Argentina) Carlos Torres

(player released during the Apertura season) (player released between the Apertura and Clausura seasons) (player released during the Clausura season)
