= List of Liga Primera coaches =

This is a list of Nicaraguan Primera División Coaches. Some of these managers were appointed as caretaker managers prior to being given a permanent position.

== Current Primera Division coaches ==
Name	Nationality	Age	Club	From	Played in Primera Division
Reyna Espinoza	NCA	56	Chinandega	2017	N/A
Mauricio Cruz Jiron	NCA	69	Diriangén	2018	N/A
Roberto Chanampe	ARG	40	Juventus	2018	N/A
Emilio Aburto	NCA	51	Managua	2017	N/A
Flavio Vanegas	NCA	TBD	Ocotal	2017	N/A
Washington Fernando Araújo	URU	54	Real Estelí	2018	N/A
Carlos Matamoros	NCA	TBD	Real Madriz	2018	N/A
Luis Vega	NCA	74	UNAN Managua	2018	N/A
Henry Urbina	NCA	TBD	Walter Ferretti	2018	N/A
Leonidas Rodríguez	NCA	TBD	ART Municipal Jalapa	2018	N/A

== List of Coaches ==
- (Nicaragua) Armando Arroyo (UCA)
- (Nicaragua) Eduardo López (America Managua)
- (Nicaragua) Martin Mena (America Managua, Diriangén FC, Xilotepelt )
- (Nicaragua) Mario Alfaro (Managua, Ocotal)
- (Nicaragua) Vidal Alonso (Ocotal, Chinandega)
- (Nicaragua) Ramon Otoniel Olivas (Real Estelí )
- (Nicaragua) Randall Moreno (Ocotal)
- (Nicaragua) Emilio Palacios (Xilotepelt)
- (Nicaragua) Leonidas Rodriguez (Ocotal, ART Jalapa, Real Madriz)
- (Nicaragua) Rolando Mendez (Diriangén FC)
- (Nicaragua) Omar Zambrana (Ocotal)
- (Nicaragua) Douglas Urbina (Juventus Managua)
- (Nicaragua) Reyna Espinoza Morán (Chinandega)
- (Nicaragua) Henry Urbina (Walter Ferretti)
- (Nicaragua) Luis Olivares (Chinandega)
- (Nicaragua) Emilio Aburto (Managua )
- (Nicaragua) Alex Cajina (Chinandega)
- (Nicaragua) Edward Urroz (Juventus Managua, UNAN Managua; Diriangén FC)
- (Nicaragua) Luis Vega (Diriangén FC, UNAN Managua)
- (Nicaragua) Luis Diaz (Walter Ferretti, Chinandega)
- (Nicaragua) Florencio Leiva (Walter Ferretti, Diriangén FC)
- (Nicaragua) Marcos Bodán (San Marcos, Nandasmo)
- (Nicaragua) Oscar Blanco (Juventus Managua;UNAN Managua)
- (Nicaragua) Tyron Acevedo (Real Madriz, ART Jalapa, Diriangén FC, Managua, Junior de Managua )
- (Nicaragua) Mario Aburto (Fox Villa)
- (Nicaragua) Eduardo Alonso (Ocotal)
- (Nicaragua) Carlos Zambrana (Managua)
- (Nicaragua) Julio Madrigal (UNAN Managua)
- (Nicaragua) Flavio Vanegas (Ocotal)
- (Nicaragua) Óscar Castillo (Sebaco; Matagalpa FC)
- (Nicaragua) Mauricio Cruz Jiron (Diriangén FC;Walter Ferretti)
- (Nicaragua) Daniel García (UNAN Managua)
- (Nicaragua) Jeffrey Perez (San Francisco)
- (Nicaragua) Carlos Matamoros (Real Madriz)
- (Nicaragua) Luis Gonzales (Walter Ferretti)
- (Nicaragua) Sting Lopez (Walter Ferretti, Matagalpa FC, Ocotal)
- (Nicaragua) Holver Flores (Real Estelí FC)
- (Nicaragua) Sergio Rodríguez (Real Estelí FC; Club Sport Sebaco)
- (Nicaragua) Jorge Vanegas (Real Madriz; HyH Export de Sébaco)
- (Nicaragua) Ricardo Gaitan (Ocotal)
- (Nicaragua) Juan Pastrana (Ocotal)
- (Nicaragua) Ricardo Arévalo (Masachapa FC)
- (Nicaragua) Alexis Zepeda (Juventus Managua)
- (Nicaragua) Miguel Angel Sanchez (Real Madriz)
- (Nicaragua) Ronaldo Alvarado (Real Madriz)
- (Nicaragua) Jaime Ruiz (Juventus Managua)
- (Honduras) Sindulio Adolfo Castellano (Real Madriz, Ocotal)
- (Honduras) Edgardo Sosa (Diriangén FC)
- (Honduras) José Francisco Valladares (Walter Ferretti)
- (Honduras) Miguel Ángel Palacios (Xilotepelt)
- (Honduras) Francisco Javier Núñez Ramos (Diriangén FC)
- (Honduras) Florentino Colindres Mairena (Ocotal)
- (Honduras) Nelson Vasquez (Ocotal)
- (Honduras) Mario Cruz (Real Madriz)
- (Honduras) Airon Reyes García (Ocotal)
- (Honduras) Elvin Roberto Cerna (Real Madriz)
- (Honduras) Carlos Cardona (Ocotal)
- (Honduras) Hector Medina (Juventus Managua; Matagalpa FC; HYH Sebaco; Real Madriz)
- (Honduras) Reynaldo Clavasquín (Ocotal)
- (Honduras) Elvin Diaz (Ocotal)
- (Honduras) Marcos Rivera (Ocotal)
- (Honduras) David Aquiles Medina (Real Estelí )
- (Honduras) Rafael Paciencia Núñez (Real Estelí )
- (Honduras) Jose Ramon Romero (ART Jalapa)
- (Argentina) Néstor Holwegger (Xilotepelt )
- (Argentina) Carlos Alberto de Toro (Diriangén FC
- (Argentina) Santiago Berrini
- (Argentina) Roberto Chanampe (Diriangen, Ocotal, Juventus Managua, Matagalpa FC, Real Madriz)
- (Argentina) Andrés Novara (Diriangén FC )
- (Argentina) Emiliano Barrera (Sebaco, Ocotal )
- (Argentina) Omar Muraco (UCA)
- (Argentina) José Giacone (Diriangén FC )
- (Argentina) Diego Vásquez (Real Estelí )
- (Argentina) Alexis Santana (Rancho Santana FC)
- (Argentina) Cristian Taberna (Rancho Santana FC)
- (Argentina) Carlos Javier Martino (ART Municipal Jalapa, Rancho Santana FC)
- (Mexico) (Spain) Abel Núñez (Xilotepelt )
- (Costa Rica) Glen Blanco (Deportivo Masatepe,HYH Sebaco, America Managua, Diriangén FC; Walter Ferretti; Real Madriz)
- (Costa Rica) Marvin Solano (Walter Ferretti
- (Costa Rica) Luis Fernando Fallas (Managua
- (Panama) Carlos Walcott (Ocotal
- (Panama) Juan Ramirez (Real Madriz)
- (El Salvador) Angel Orellana (Diriangén FC, xilotepelt, Real Madriz, ART Jalapa)
- (El Salvador) Juan Ramón Trejo (Real Madriz, Ocotal)
- (El Salvador) Jose Luis Rugamas (Diriangén FC)
- (El Salvador) Carlos Aguilar (Walter Ferretti)
- (Colombia) Wilson Gil (Chinandega
- (Colombia) Luís Eduardo Montaño (Real Madriz, UNAN Managua
- (Colombia) Armando Ricardo Hernandez (Real Madriz
- (Colombia) Javier Reales (Ocotal
- (Colombia) Javier Londono (Diriangén FC, Juventus Managua, San francisco; ART Municipal Jalapa)
- (Colombia) Edison Oquendo (Walter Ferretti, Juventus Managua)
- (Colombia) Jairo Basabe (ART Municipal Jalapa)
- (Spain) Mario Reig (Diriangén FC)
- (Spain) José María Beltrán (UCA)
- (Spain) Antonio Escalante (La Nica;Deportivo Español)
- (Spain) Juan Cortés (Managua FC;Matagalpa FC)
- (Spain) Kevin Vidaña Sánchez (Ocotal)
- (Uruguay) José Nelson Lima (Bluefields)
- (Uruguay) Daniel Bartolotta (Real Madriz
- (Uruguay) Garabet Avedissian (UNAN Managua
- (Uruguay) Washington Fernando Araújo (Real Estelí
- (Brazil) Flavio Da Silva (Diriangén FC, Walter Ferretti, Managua; Rancho Santana FC
- (Venezuela) Amleto Bonaccorso (Managua
- (Venezuela) Jack Galindo (Managua
- (Mexico) Javier Martínez Espinoza (Juventus Managua
- (Mexico) Arturo Zavala (Real Madriz
- (Mexico) José Luis Trejo (Real Estelí )
- (Chile) Jonathon Orellana (Rancho Santana FC)
- (Peru) Jorge Dancur (Flor de Caña FC)
