= 2026–27 Liga Primera =

Liga Primera
- Season: 2026–27
- Champions: TBD (Apertura); TBD (Clausura)
- Relegated: TBD
- CONCACAF Central American Cup: TBD
- CONCACAF Central American Cup: TBD
- Top goalscorer: Apertura: TBD (00 goals); Clausura: TBD (00 goals)
- Biggest home win: Apertura: TBD 6–0 TBD
- Biggest away win: Apertura: TBD 3-4 TBD (3 November 2024)
- Highest scoring: Apertura: TBD 4-4 TBD (5 October 2024)
- All statistics correct as of 21 May 2026.

The 2026–27 Liga Primera de Nicaragua football season was to be divided into two tournaments, Apertura and Clausura. The season will determine the 83rd and 84th champions in the history of the Liga Primera de Nicaragua, the top division of football in Nicaragua. The Apertura tournament is to be played in the second half of 2025, while the Clausura is to be played in the first half of 2026.

== Teams ==
=== Team information ===
A total of ten teams contested the league, including nine sides from the 2025–26 Primera División, and one side from the 2025–26 Segunda División.

Real Madriz finished last in the aggregate table and were relegated to the Segunda División. The champions from the Segunda División, San Marcos FC, were promoted in their place.

The 9th place team in the aggregate table, UNAN Managua, faced the second-place team from the Segunda División, Matiguás FC, in a playoff for a spot in the Primera División. UNAN Managua won 3–1 over two legs, meaning they remained in the Primera División.[ ]

=== Promotion and relegation ===
Promoted from Segunda División as of June, 2026.

- Champions: San Marcos FC

Relegated to Segunda División as of June, 2026.

- Last Place: Real Madriz

=== Personnel and kits ===
Team	Chairman	Head coach	Captain	Kit manufacturer	Shirt sponsor(s)
ART Jalapa	TBD	(Colombia) Javier Londoño	(Nicaragua) TBD	Huriver	Ferreter Lenar; Noelito
Diriangén	TBD	(Costa Rica) Alexander Vargas	(Nicaragua) TBD	Macron	Credifacil, Doradobet, Claro, Proplisa
CS Sebaco	TBD	(Nicaragua) Sergio Ivan rodriguez	(Nicaragua) TBD	La Cabra Sport	Cafe OX, Siles, Transporte Tovel
Managua	TBD	(Argentina) Daniel Corti	(Nicaragua) TBD	Orion Elite	Claro, Chevron, Fetesa
Matagalpa FC	TBD	(Argentina) Roberto Chanampe	(Brazil) Robinson Luiz	El Brother	Standard Chontal; Central Gas; Segruidad Aguila; La Bodeguita; Distarija
Rancho Santana FC	TBD	(Costa Rica) Kenneth Barrantes	TBD	La Cabra Sport	Motivforce, Hertz, Sporade
Real Esteli	TBD	(Argentina) Diego Vásquez	(Nicaragua) TBD	Orion Elite	Tigo, Cafe Ox, Baterias KOBE,
San Marcos FC	TBD	(Nicaragua) Tyrone Acevedo	(Nicaragua)	TBD	TBD
UNAN Managua	TBD	(Brazil) Flavio da Silva	(Nicaragua) TBD	Joma	Universided de Managua
Walter Ferretti	TBD	(Honduras) José Valladares	(Nicaragua) TBD	La Cabra Sport	Electrolit; Enatrel; Nica Logistics

== Managerial Changes ==
=== Before the start of the season ===
Team	Outgoing manager	Manner of departure	Date of vacancy	Replaced by	Date of appointment	Position in table
Managua	(Nicaragua) Emilio Aburto	Resigned	May, 2026	(Argentina) Daniel Corti	May, 2026	
Walter Ferretti	(Nicaragua) Sting Cruz	Mutual Consent	June 2026	(Honduras) José Valladares	June, 2026	th (2026 Clausura)
UNAN Managua	(Nicaragua) Oscar Blanco	Mutual Consent	June 2026	(Brazil) Flavio da Silva	June, 2026	9th (2026 Clausura)

=== During the Apertura season ===
Team	Outgoing manager	Manner of departure	Date of vacancy	Replaced by	Date of appointment	Position in table
Club Sport Sebaco	(Nicaragua) Sergio Ivan Rodriguez	Mutual Consent	August 31, 2026	(Nicaragua) Holver Flores	September 1, 2026	th (2026 Apertura)
Real Esteli	(Argentina) Diego Vásquez	Resigned	August 31, 2026	(Nicaragua) Samuel Olivas (Interim)	September 2026	th (2026 Apertura)
Real Esteli	(Nicaragua) Samuel Olivas	Interimship ended, return to assistant coach	September 3, 2026	(Chile) Marco Antonio Figueroa	September 4, 2026	th (2026 Apertura)
ART Jalapa	(Colombia) Javier Londoño	Sacked	September 13, 2026	(Argentina) Raúl Musuruana	September 19, 2026	th (2026 Apertura)
Rancho Santana	(Costa Rica) Kenneth Barrantes	Resigned	October, 2026	(Nicaragua) Edward Urroz	October, 2026	th (2026 Apertura)
Matagalpa	(Colombia) Roberto Chanampe	Sacked	October, 2026	(Argentina) Javier Londoño	October, 2026	th (2026 Apertura)

== Apertura 2026 ==
=== Standings ===
Pos	Team	Pld	W	D	L	GF	GA	GD	Pts	Qualification
1	Managua	15	12	2	1	45	15	+30	38	Advance to Playoffs semi-finals
2	Diriangén	15	10	3	2	30	16	+14	33	Advance to Playoffs semi-finals
3	Real Estelí	15	8	4	3	27	14	+13	28	Advance to Playoffs quarter-finals
4	UNAN Managua	14	7	3	4	17	15	+2	24	Advance to Playoffs quarter-finals
5	Walter Ferretti	14	6	2	6	30	23	+7	20	Advance to Playoffs quarter-finals
6	Club Sébaco	14	5	2	7	15	27	−12	17	Advance to Playoffs quarter-finals
7	Municipal Jalapa	15	4	3	8	15	19	−4	15	
8	San Marcos	15	3	4	8	16	24	−8	13	
9	Matagalpa	14	3	1	10	7	31	−24	10	
10	Rancho Santana	15	1	4	10	12	30	−18	7	

Updated to match(es) played on 29 October 2026. Source: Soccerway
Rules for classification: 1) points; 2) goal difference; 3) number of goals scored; 4) head-to-head points; 5) head-to-head goal difference; 6) head-to-head goals scored; 7) draw.

=== Playoffs ===
==== Bracket ====
Semi-finals
1
4
3
2

Final

==== Quarterfinals ====
November 2026

v

TBD progressed.

November 2026

v

TBD progressed.

November 2026

v

TBD progressed.

November 2026

v

TBD progressed.

==== Semi-finals ====
Team 1	Agg.	Team 2	1st leg	2nd leg
	-		-	-
	-		-	-

===== First leg =====
November/December 2026

v

November/December 2026

v

===== Second leg =====
December 2026

v

TBD won on aggregate.

December 2026

v

TBD won on penalties.

==== Final ====
===== First leg =====
December 2026

v

===== Second leg =====
December 2026

v

TBD won on aggregate.

Apertura 2026 champions

== List of foreign players ==
This is a list of foreign players in the 2026–27 season. The following players:

1. Have played at least one game for the respective club.
2. Have not been capped for the Nicaragua national football team on any level, independently from the birthplace

A new rule was introduced this season, that clubs can have four foreign players per club and can only add a new player if there is an injury or a player/s is released, and it is before the closing of the season transfer window.

ART Jalapa

- (Colombia) Jhan Cuero
- (Colombia) Adrián Gómez
- (Colombia) Juan Marín
- (Colombia) Cristián Ramírez
- (Spain) Walid Birrou

Diriangén

- (Argentina) Matías Galvaliz
- (Argentina) Alan Schonfeld
- (Colombia) Lorenzo Orellano
- (Costa Rica) Bayron Murcia
- (Costa Rica) Víctor Castro
- (Panama) Jeremy Emmons
- (Panama) Jaquin Gargonia
- (Uruguay) Bruno Gabriel Barja

CS Sebaco

- (Colombia) Mario Ramirez
- (Cuba) Marcos Campos
- (Cuba) Samoelbis Lopez
- (Cuba) Yordan Castañer
- (Cuba) Ricardo Polo

Managua

- (Argentina) Lucas Carrizo
- (Argentina) Nazareno Gómez
- (Argentina) Matias Steib
- (Colombia) Darwin Carrero
- (Cuba) Daniel Diaz

Matagalpa FC

- (Argentina) Franco Rondina (*)
- (Argentina) Matias Vernon
- (Brazil) Robinson Luiz
- (Honduras) Kevin Castro
- (Colombia) Jerson Lora

Rancho Santana FC

- (Colombia) Óscar Mieles
- (Costa Rica) Axel Bustos
- (Costa Rica) Bryan Cordero
- (Costa Rica) Justin Saen
- (Mexico) Taufic Guarch

Real Estelí

- (Argentina) Emanuel Casado
- (Argentina) Ricardo Darío Blanco
- (Costa Rica) Josué Mitchell
- (Honduras) Héctor Aranda
- (Uruguay) Adrián Colombino
- (Uruguay) John Faust

San Marcos

- (Colombia) Hernán Benítez
- (Colombia) Esteban Molina
- (Colombia) Ángel Olier
- (Colombia) Robinson Paterson
- (Panama) Julio Sánchez

UNAN Managua

- (Argentina) Lucas Carrizo
- (Cuba) Dario Ramos
- (Colombia) Fabian Lemus
- (Colombia) Juan Alejandro Osorio

Walter Ferretti

- (Brazil) Marcos Gabriel
- (Colombia) Juan Riascos
- (Panama) Omar Hinestroza
- (Panama) Sergio Cunningham

(player released during the Apertura season) (player released between the Apertura and Clausura seasons) (player released during the Clausura season)
