= 2024–25 Liga Primera =

Liga Primera
- Season: 2024–25
- Champions: Diriangen (Apertura); Managua (Clausura)
- Relegated: Deportivo Ocotal
- Matches: 65
- Goals: 192 (2.95 per match)
- Top goalscorer: Apertura: (Nicaragua) Junior Arteaga (8 goals); Clausura: (Nicaragua) Edwin Lopez (11 goals)
- Biggest home win: Apertura: Diriangén 6–0 Matagalpa
- Biggest away win: Apertura: Deportivo Ocotal 3-4 Real Estelí (3 November 2024)
- Highest scoring: Apertura: Matagalpa 4-4 Diriangén (5 October 2024)
- All statistics correct as of 7 November 2024.

The 2024–25 Liga Primera de Nicaragua football season was divided into two tournaments, Apertura and Clausura. The season would determine the 81st and 82nd champions in the history of the Liga Primera de Nicaragua, the top division of football in Nicaragua. The Apertura tournament was played in the second half of 2024, while the Clausura was played in the first half of 2025.

== Teams ==
=== Team information ===
A total of ten teams contested the league, including nine sides from the 2023–24 Primera División, and one side from the 2023–24 Segunda División.

Masachapa FC finished last in the aggregate table and were relegated to the Segunda División. The champions from the Segunda División, Rancho Santana FC, were promoted in their place.

The 9th place team in the aggregate table, Matagalpa FC, faced the second-place team from the Segunda División, Juventus Managua, in a playoff for a spot in the Primera División. Matagalpa FC won 1–0 over two legs, meaning they remained in the Primera División.

=== Promotion and relegation ===
Promoted from Segunda División as of June, 2024.

- Champions: Rancho Santana FC

Relegated to Segunda División as of June, 2024.

- Last place: Masachapa FC

=== Personnel and kits ===
Team	Chairman	Head coach	Captain	Kit manufacturer	Shirt sponsor(s)
ART Jalapa	TBD	(Nicaragua) Tyrone Acevedo	(Colombia) Erick Alcazar	Huriver	Ferreter Lenar, Noelito
Diriangén	TBD	(Argentina) José Giancone	(Nicaragua) Jason Coronel	Macron	Credifacil, Doradobet, Claro, Proplisa
CS Sebaco	TBD	(Nicaragua) Sergio Ivan Rodriguez	(Nicaragua) Luis Manuel Galeano	La Cabra Sport	Cafe OX, Siles, Transporte Tovel
Managua	TBD	(Brazil) Flavio Da Silva	(Brazil) Vinicius de Souza	Orion Elite	Claro, Chevron, Fetesa
Matagalpa FC	TBD	(Argentina) Roberto Chanampe	(Panama) Rodolfo Forbes	El Brother	Standard Chontal; Central Gas; Segruidad Aguila; La Bodeguita; Distarija
Ocotal	TBD	(Nicaragua) Ricardo Gaitan	(Nicaragua) Leonardo Tercero	La Cabra Sport	Nil
Rancho Santana FC	TBD	(Argentina) Carlos Javier Martino	(Nicaragua) Ronald Palacios	Mi Ropa Favorita.com	Miropa Favorito.com, BlackSwan
Real Esteli	TBD	(Nicaragua) Otoniel Olivas	(Nicaragua) Josue Quijano	Orion Elite	Tigo, Cafe Ox
UNAN Managua	TBD	(Nicaragua) Luis Vega	(Nicaragua) Nahum Peralta	Joma	Universided de Managua
Walter Ferretti	TBD	(Costa Rica) Glen Blanco	(Nicaragua) Denis Espinoza	La Cabra Sport	Claro; Nica Logistics; INiser

== Managerial changes ==
=== Before the start of the season ===
Team	Outgoing manager	Manner of departure	Date of vacancy	Replaced by	Date of appointment	Position in table
Ocotal	(Honduras) Nelson Vasquez	Mutual consent	June 8, 2024	(Nicaragua) Ricardo Gaitan	July, 2024	th (2024 Clausura)
Rancho Santana FC	(Honduras) TBD	Mutual consent	July, 2024	(Argentina) Carlos Javier Martino	July, 2024	Newly Promoted (2024 Clausura)

=== During the Apertura season ===
Team	Outgoing manager	Manner of departure	Date of vacancy	Replaced by	Date of appointment	Position in table
Walter Ferretti	(Costa Rica) Glen Blanco	Mutual consent	September, 2024	(Nicaragua) Mauricio Cruz	September, 2024	th (2024 Apertura)
Diriangén	(Argentina) José Giancone	Mutual Consent, to become head of Deportivo Saprissa	October, 2024	(Nicaragua) Edward Urroz	October, 2024	th (2024 Apertura)
Managua	(Brazil) Flavio Da Silva	Mutual consent	October, 2024	(Nicaragua) Emilio Aburto	October, 2024	th (2024 Apertura)
Ocotal	(Nicaragua) Ricardo Gaitan	Sacked	October, 2024	(Spain) Kevin Vidaña Sánchez	October, 2024	10th (2024 Apertura)
Rancho Santana FC	(Argentina) Carlos Javier Martino	Sacked	November, 2024	(Argentina) Cristian Taberna	December, 2024	9th (2024 Apertura)

=== Before the start of the Clausura season ===
Team	Outgoing manager	Manner of departure	Date of vacancy	Replaced by	Date of appointment	Position in table
UNAN Managua	(Nicaragua) Daniel Garcia	Interimship finished	November, 2024	(Nicaragua) Luis Vega	December, 2024	9th (2024 Apertura)
Rancho Santana FC	(Argentina) Cristian Taberna	Interimship finished	November, 2024	(Chile) Jonathon Orellana	December, 2024	9th (2024 Apertura)
Matagalpa FC	(Argentina) Roberto Chanampe	Contract finished	December, 2024	(Spain) Juan Cortez	January, 2025	
ART Jalapa	(Nicaragua) Tyrone Acevedo	Contract finished	December, 2024	(Colombia) Jairo Basabe	January, 2025	9th (2024 Apertura)

=== During the Clausura season ===
Team	Outgoing manager	Manner of departure	Date of vacancy	Replaced by	Date of appointment	Position in table
Matagalpa FC	(Spain) Juan Cortez	Sacked	February, 2025	(Honduras) Héctor Medina	February, 2025	9th (2025)
Diriangén FC	(Nicaragua) Edward Urroz	Sacked	March, 2025	(Argentina) José Giancone	April 1, 2025	4th (2025 Clausura)

== Apertura 2024 ==
=== Standings ===
Pos	Team	Pld	W	D	L	GF	GA	GD	Pts	Qualification
1	Diriangén (C)	18	12	4	2	54	15	+39	40	Advance to Playoffs semi-finals
2	Real Estelí	18	10	6	2	36	14	+22	36	Advance to Playoffs semi-finals
3	Matagalpa	18	8	7	3	30	22	+8	31	Advance to Playoffs quarter-finals
4	Walter Ferretti	18	8	5	5	21	15	+6	29	Advance to Playoffs quarter-finals
5	Club Sébaco	18	6	6	6	24	20	+4	24	Advance to Playoffs quarter-finals
6	Managua	18	7	3	8	28	27	+1	24	Advance to Playoffs quarter-finals
7	Municipal Jalapa	18	5	5	8	18	29	−11	20	
8	UNAN Managua	18	5	4	9	19	34	−15	19	
9	Rancho Santana	18	3	3	12	14	40	−26	12	
10	Deportivo Ocotal	18	3	3	12	15	43	−28	12	

Source: [https://www.soccerway.com/nicaragua/liga-primera-2024-2025/results/
Rules for classification: 1) points; 2) goal difference; 3) number of goals scored; 4) head-to-head points; 5) head-to-head goal difference; 6) head-to-head goals scored; 7) draw.
(C) Champions

=== Playoffs ===
==== Quarterfinals ====
December 1, 2024

Deportivo Walter Ferretti	1-0	Club Sébaco
Leandro Figueroa 31'		Nil

Estadio

Walter Ferretti progressed.

December 2, 2024

Matagalpa	1-5	Managua
Jorge Garcia 11'		Juan Barrera 24' 27' 43'; Edward Morillo 71'; Agner Acuna 81'

Estadio

Managua progressed.

==== Semi-finals ====
Team 1	Agg.	Team 2	1st leg	2nd leg
Diriangen	2-2	Managua	1-1	1-1
Real Esteli	5-2	Deportivo Walter Ferretti	4-1	1-1

===== First leg =====
8 December 2024
19:00

Managua	1-1	Diriangen
Jefferson Bonilla 2'		Justing Cano 48'

Estadio Nacional, Managua

9 December 2024
17:00

Walter Ferretti	1-4	Real Esteli
Jarek Caceres 2'		Hernández 16' 84'; Byron Bonilla 73' 76'

Estadio Nacional, Managua

===== Second leg =====
15 December 2024
TBD

Diriangen	1-1	Managua
Junio Artega 66'		Maykel Reyes 22'

Estadio Cacique Diriangén

Diriangen won on aggregate.

15 December 2024
TBD

Real Esteli	1-1	Walter Ferretti
Harold Medina (pen.), 64'		Dshon Forbes 84'

Real Esteli won 5-2 on aggregate.

==== Final ====
===== First leg =====
19 December 2024
TBD

Real Esteli	1-1	Diriangen
Juan Vieyra 28'		Renzo Carballo 55'

Estadio Independencia, Esteli
Referee: Nitzar Sandoval

===== Second leg =====
22 December 2024
TBD

Diriangen	3-2	Real Esteli
Junior Arteaga 6'; Melvin Hernández 11'; Luis Coronel 97'		Byron Bonilla 19'; William Parra 29'

Estadio Cacique Diriangén
Referee: Ricardo Mendoza

Diriangen won 4-3 on aggregate.

Apertura 2024 champions

33rd title

==== Top goalscorer (Apertura 2024) ====
No.	Player	Club	Goals
1	(Nicaragua) Junior Arteaga	Diriangén	12
2	(Nicaragua) Jorge García	Matagalpa	12
3	(Nicaragua) Edgar Castillo	Club Sébaco	10
4	(Paraguay) Renzo Carballo	Diriangén	9
5	(Colombia) Arley Bonilla	Managua	8
6	(Nicaragua) Byron Bonilla	Real Esteli	6
7	(Honduras) Edwin Castro	Ocotal	6
8	(Argentina) Matias Veron	Matagalpa	6
9	(Brazil) Ewerton	Managua	5
10	(Nicaragua) Luis Coronel	Diriangén	5

== Clausura 2025 ==
=== Standings ===
Pos	Team	Pld	W	D	L	GF	GA	GD	Pts	Qualification
1	Real Estelí	18	15	1	2	42	17	+25	46	Advance to Playoffs semi-finals
2	Managua (C)	18	11	3	4	31	14	+17	36	Advance to Playoffs semi-finals
3	Diriangén	18	11	2	5	34	21	+13	35	Advance to Playoffs quarter-finals
4	Walter Ferretti	18	6	5	7	19	17	+2	23	Advance to Playoffs quarter-finals
5	Club Sébaco	18	6	5	7	19	23	−4	23	Advance to Playoffs quarter-finals
6	Matagalpa	18	5	6	7	25	30	−5	21	Advance to Playoffs quarter-finals
7	UNAN Managua	18	5	5	8	20	28	−8	20	
8	Municipal Jalapa	18	4	6	8	18	25	−7	18	
9	Rancho Santana	18	3	6	9	15	26	−11	15	
10	Deportivo Ocotal	18	3	3	12	18	40	−22	12	

Rules for classification: 1) points; 2) goal difference; 3) number of goals scored; 4) head-to-head points; 5) head-to-head goal difference; 6) head-to-head goals scored; 7) draw.
(C) Champions

=== Playoffs ===
==== Quarterfinals ====
May 4, 2025

Deportivo Walter Ferretti	2-3	Club Sébaco
Brandon Ayerdis 38'; Luis Canate 43'		Mario Ramirez 42'; Brayan Lopez 46' 66'

Estadio Nacional, Managua

Club Sébaco progressed.

May 4, 2025
19:00

Diriangén	2-0	Matagalpa
Erick Tellez 22'; Jonathan Moncada 94'		Nil

Estadio Cacique Diriangén, Diriamba

Diriangén progressed.

==== Semi-finals ====
Team 1	Agg.	Team 2	1st leg	2nd leg
Managua	4-2	Diriangen	1-1	3-1
Real Esteli	4-1	Club Sébaco	3-1	1-0

===== First leg =====
May 7, 2025
15:00

Club Sébaco	1-3	Real Esteli
Mario Ramirez (pen.), 43'		Hernández 26'; Byron Bonilla 57' 76'

Estadio Carlos Fonsexa, Sebaco

May 8, 2025
20:00

Diriangen	1-1	Managua
Renzo Carballo 86'		Maykel Reyes 19'

Estadio Cacique Diriangén, Diriamba

===== Second leg =====
May 9, 2025

Real Esteli	1-0	Club Sébaco
William Parra 80'		Nil

Estadio Independencia, Esteli
Referee: Félix Mojica

Real Esteli won 4-1 on aggregate.

May 10, 2025

Managua	3-1	Diriangen
Maykel Reyes 7'; Ewerton Bezerra 43'; Jose Martinez 67'		Erick Tellez 66'

Estadio Nacional, Managua

Managua won 4-2 on aggregate.

==== Final ====
===== First leg =====
May 17, 2025
19:00

Managua	2-0	Real Esteli
José Martínez; Maykel Reyes		Nil

Estadio Nacional, Managua
Referee: Eliel Aguirre

===== Second leg =====
May 25, 2025
TBD

Real Esteli	1-1	Managua
Harold Medina 42'		Kevin Serapio 73'

Estadio Independencia, Esteli
Referee: Félix Mojica

Managua won 3-1 on aggregate.

Clausura 2025 champions

2nd title

== List of foreign players ==
This is a list of foreign players in the 2024–25 season. The following players:

1. Have played at least one game for the respective club.
2. Have not been capped for the Nicaragua national football team on any level, independently from the birthplace

A new rule was introduced this season, that clubs can have four foreign players per club and can only add a new player if there is an injury or a player/s is released, and it is before the closing of the season transfer window.

ART Jalapa

- (Argentina) Hernan Paredes
- (Colombia) Keider Leiva
- (Colombia) Neider SanJuan
- (Cuba) Alejandro Delgado
- (Cuba) Mario Peñalver
- (Uruguay) José Bernardo Laureiro

Diriangén

- (Argentina) Carlos Tórres
- (Colombia) Didier Delgado
- (Argentina) Matias Galvaliz
- (Costa Rica) Alfonso Quesada
- (Paraguay) Renzo Carballo

CS Sebaco

- (Argentina) Miguel Pucharella
- (Honduras) Brayan Zúñiga
- (Colombia) David Castrillon
- (Colombia) Mario Ramirez
- (Colombia) Braison Cardonna
- (Colombia) Ronaldo Pabon
- (Panama) Rogelio Juárez
- (Colombia) Marvin Sabel Romero
- (Colombia) Victor Mezu
- (Argentina) Lautaro Canitano

Managua

- (Argentina) Matías Steib
- (Brazil) Ewerton da Silva
- (Brazil) Gabriel Junior
- (Brazil) Gabriel Vidal
- (Brazil) Gyan Araujo
- (Brazil) Lucas da Silva
- (Cuba) Maykel Reyes
- (Colombia) Arley Bonilla
- (Colombia) Darwin Carrero
- (Paraguay) Luis Ibarra

Matagalpa FC

- (Argentina) Matias Vernon
- (Brazil) Robinson Luiz
- (Honduras) Kevin Castro
- (Panama) Rodolfo Forbes
- (Colombia) Edwin Lopez
- (Mexico) Taufic Guarch
- (Colombia) Jerson Lora
- (Colombia) Ronaldinho Caicedo
- (Colombia) Victor Landazuri

Ocotal

- (Brazil) Cristano Fernandez
- (Cuba) Erick Rizo
- (Colombia) John Rivas
- (Honduras) Gabriel Ortiz
- (Honduras) Óscar Rosales
- (Argentina) Ale Corvalán
- (El Salvador) Juan Sanchez
- (Uruguay) Cristian Olivera

Rancho Santana FC

- (Argentina) Mauro Leiva
- (Colombia) Marlon Ibarguen
- (Colombia) Nester Carabali
- (Colombia) Paul Barbosa
- (Ecuador) Johan Padilla
- (Ecuador) Jefferson Cabezas
- (Chile) Juan Pablo Abarzúa
- (Colombia) Dayrn Benavides
- (Cuba) Mario Peñalver
- (Cuba) Ismel Morgado
- (Cuba) Samoelbis Lopez

Real Estelí

- (Argentina) Juan Vieyra
- (Mexico) Ivan Ochoa
- (Colombia) Leyvin Balanta
- (Colombia) William Parra
- (Colombia) Jose Lloreda
- (Uruguay) Mathias Techera
- (Mexico) Jorge Sanchez Perrito

UNAN Managua

- (Colombia) Fabian Lemus
- (Cuba) Dario Ramos
- (Colombia) Editson Mina
- (Colombia) Jhans Mina
- (Colombia) Jhon Mena
- (Panama) Sergio Cunningham

Walter Ferretti

- (Argentina) Leandro Figueroa
- (Argentina) Abel Mendez
- (Argentina) Fabián Monserrat
- (Costa Rica) Sheldon Harris
- (Panama) Omar Hinestroza
- (Panama) Luis Canate
- (Paraguay) Jose Cabañas
- (Paraguay) Richard Monges

(player released during the Apertura season) (player released between the Apertura and Clausura seasons) (player released during the Clausura season)
