= Elving =

Elving can be both a masculine given name and a surname. Notable people with this name include:

== Given name ==
- Elving Anderson (1921–2014), American geneticist
- Elving Andersson (born 1953), Swedish politician

== Surname ==
- Bruce Elving (1935–2011), American publisher and professor
- Niclas Elving (born 1986), Swedish footballer
- Philip J. Elving (1913–1984), American chemist
