= Gerardo Aguilar =

Gerardo Aguilar may refer to:

- Gerardo Aguilar (footballer) (born 1990), Mexican footballer
- Gerardo Aguilar Ramírez (fl. 2008–2010), Colombian guerilla leader
