= Jaime Ruiz =

Jaime Ruiz can refer to:

- Jaime Ruiz (Mexican footballer) (born 1975), Mexican footballer
- Jaime Ruiz (Peruvian footballer) (born 1935), Peruvian footballer
- Jaime Ruiz (Colombian footballer) (born 1984), Colombian footballer
