= Juan Pablo Abarzúa =

Chilean footballer

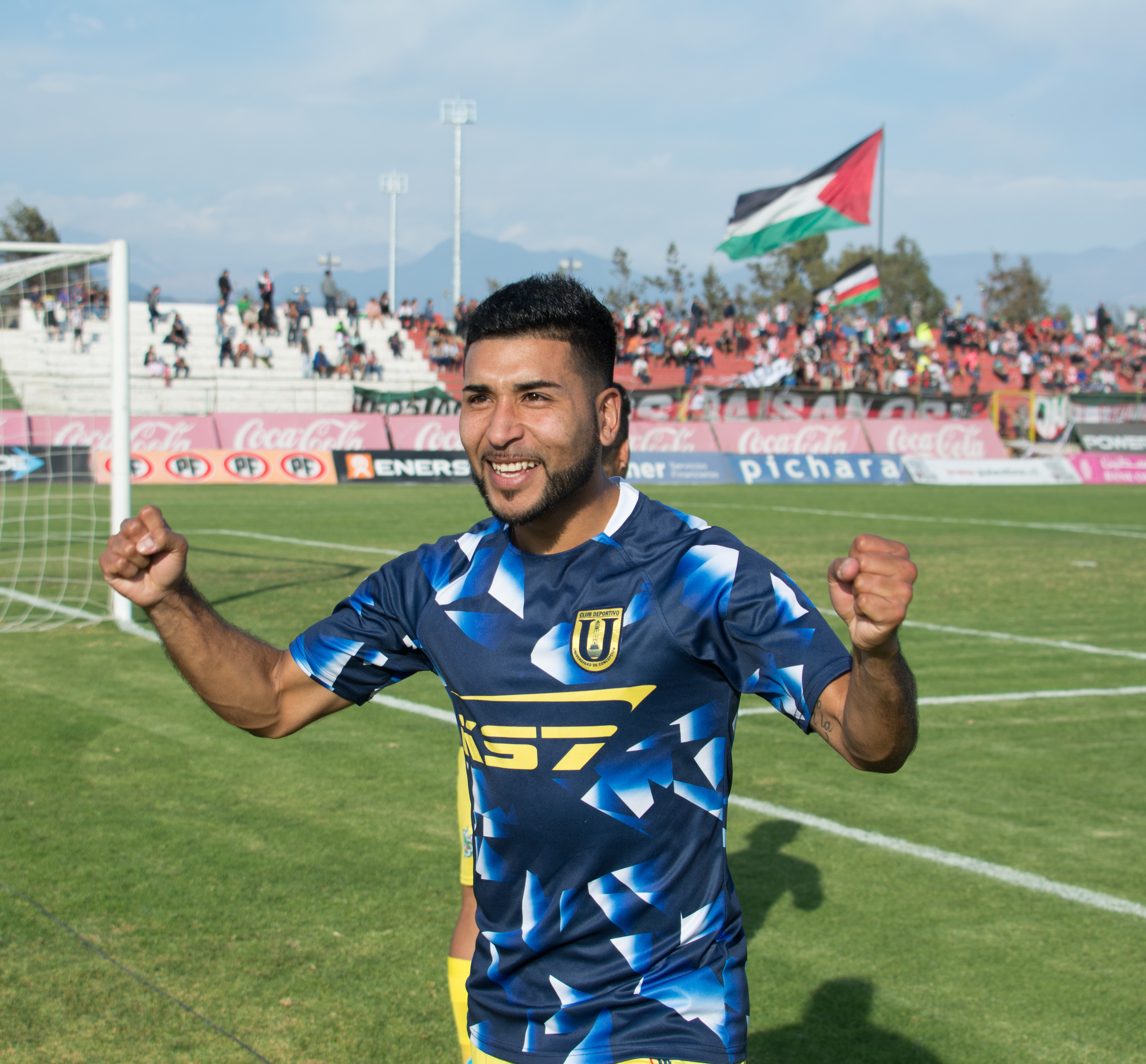

Personal information
- Full name: Juan Pablo Abarzúa Sepúlveda
- Date of birth: 17 February 1992 (age 34)
- Place of birth: Concepción, Chile
- Height: 1.68 m (5 ft 6 in)
- Position: Midfielder

Team information
- Current team: Rancho Santana
- Number: 10

Youth career
- Naval

Senior career*
Years	Team	Apps	(Gls)
2012	Naval	1	(0)
2013–2014	Fernández Vial	–	(–)
2014	Naval	0	(0)
2014–2017	Deportes Puerto Montt	98	(15)
2018–2022	Universidad de Concepción	57	(1)
2019	→ Cobreloa (loan)	22	(0)
2023	Deportes Puerto Montt	21	(0)
2024	Deportes Rengo	23	(0)
2025–	Rancho Santana	14	(0)
- * Club domestic league appearances and goals as of 4 May 2025

Juan Pablo Abarzúa Sepúlveda (born 17 February 1992) is a Chilean professional footballer who plays as a midfielder for Liga Primera de Nicaragua club Rancho Santana.

== Club career ==
Born in Concepción, Chile, Abarzúa started his career with Naval and Fernández Vial. In 2014, he signed with Deportes Puerto Montt, with whom he won 2014–15 Segunda División Profesional and spent three and a half seasons.

In 2018, Abarzúa joined Universidad de Concepción in the Chilean Primera División and stayed with them until 2022, with a stint on loan with Cobreloa in 2019.

In 2023, Abarzúa returned to Deportes Puerto Montt and switched to Deportes Rengo the next year.

In 2025, Abarzúa moved abroad and signed with Rancho Santana in the Liga Primera de Nicaragua.
