= Miguel Potes =

Colombian footballer (born 1983)

Personal information
- Full name: Miguel Ángel Potes Mina
- Date of birth: September 21, 1983 (age 43)
- Place of birth: Colombia
- Height: 1.80 m (5 ft 11 in)
- Position: Forward

Senior career*
Years	Team	Apps	(Gls)
- Club Santa Fe
- Deportes Tolima
- Deportivo Pasto
2008–2009	Deportivo Paraguayo		
2010–2011	Diriangén FC	9	(10)
2011	Vista Hermosa		
- * Club domestic league appearances and goals

Miguel Ángel Potes Mina (born September 21, 1983) is a Colombian football player who most recently played for Vista Hermosa of El Salvador.
