= Elving Anderson =

American geneticist

- Born: Victor Elving Anderson; September 6, 1921; Stromsburg, Nebraska
- Died: March 9, 2014 (aged 92); Stillwater, Minnesota
- Education: Bethel University; Bethel Theological Seminary; University of Minnesota
- Spouse: Carol (m. 1946–2014)
- Children: 4
- Awards: Ambassador for Epilepsy Award from the International League Against Epilepsy (2001)
- Scientific career
- Fields: Human genetics
- Institutions: Bethel University; University of Minnesota
- Thesis: A genetical study of human breast cancer (1953)
- Doctoral advisor: Sheldon C. Reed

Victor Elving Anderson (September 6, 1921 – March 9, 2014) was an American geneticist whose research focused on the role of genetics in human diseases such as breast cancer and epilepsy. He was also active in advocating for the reconciliation of science with his Christian faith, arguing that the two were not necessarily contradictory.

== Biography ==
Anderson was born on September 6, 1921, in Stromsburg, Nebraska. After working in his family's funeral home, he enrolled at Bethel University (then known as Bethel Junior College), from which he received an A.A. degree. He then attended Bethel Theological Seminary, where he took a zoology class that prompted his subsequent interest in biology and genetics, and where he met Carol, whom he married in 1946. He then transferred to the University of Minnesota, where he received his B.S., M.S., and Ph.D., all while teaching part-time at Bethel. He was a faculty member at Bethel from 1946 to 1960, where his positions included head of the biology department and dean of students. In 1961, he joined the faculty of the Dight Institute for Human Genetics at the University of Minnesota; he remained on the university's faculty until retiring in 1991.

He was the first secretary of the Behavior Genetics Association in 1972, and served as its president in 1979. He also served as president of the American Scientific Affiliation, Sigma Xi, and the Institute for Advanced Christian Studies. In 2001, he received the Ambassador for Epilepsy Award from the International League Against Epilepsy. He died on March 9, 2014, in Stillwater, Minnesota.
