= Jaime Ruiz (Mexican footballer) =

Mexican footballer (born 1975)

Personal information
- Full name: Jaime Ruiz Llaneza
- Date of birth: 1 April 1975 (age 51)
- Place of birth: Culiacán, Mexico
- Height: 1.72 m (5 ft 8 in)
- Position: Midfielder

Senior career*
Years	Team	Apps	(Gls)
1999–2001	Cruz Azul	23	(2)
2001–2002	Celaya	18	(0)
2003–2004	Irapuato	24	(1)
2004–2006	Dorados	65	(5)
2006	Veracruz	5	(1)
2007	Necaxa	13	(2)
2007	Veracruz	0	(0)
2008	Morelia	5	(0)
2009	Jaibos		
2009	Culiacan		
- * Club domestic league appearances and goals as of 11 December

Jaime Ruiz Llaneza (born 1 April 1975) is a Mexican former footballer, who played as attacking midfielder with Monarcas Morelia in Primera División de México. Ruiz made his debut on 19 August 1999 in a 2–1 loss against with two own goals Pachuca.
