= CD Jalapa (Nicaragua) =

Association football club in Nicaragua

Deportivo Jalapa
- Full name: Club Deportivo Jalapa
- Founded: 1995
- Dissolved: 2007
- Ground: Estadio Alejandro Ramos; Jalapa, Nicaragua
- Capacity: 1,000
- Chairman: Jorge Galeano
- League: Primera División, Nicaragua
Home colours	Away colours

Deportivo Jalapa was a Nicaraguan football team which has played at the domestic top level. They were based in Jalapa.

== History ==
Jalapa would win their first title in the club history by defeating defending champion Walter Ferretti 4–0 in the second leg of the final at home at Estadio Alejandro Ramos. The teams drew 1–1 in the first leg in Managua, but goals from Tomás Centeno, Edgard Rochez (penalty), Ramón Osorio and Selvin álvarez gave the provincial side their first championship, followed by an impromptu parade through the city streets led by the players and thousands of fans. However, after winning the title the club hit financial trouble, meaning they were unable to keep the core of players and management with this the next season led to not only the club failing to reach the semis but on the international tournament they let in a record 40 goals in three games (including a 17–0 loss to Salvadorian team FAS and 19–0 loss to Panamanian team Árabe Unido)

They were relegated after the 2007–08 season before being dissolved ahead of the 2009 Clausura season.

== Achievements ==
- Primera División de Nicaragua: 1
  2001−02

== List of managers ==
- (Nicaragua) Leonidas Rodríguez (2001−2002)
- (Nicaragua) Salvador Dubois Leiva
- (Argentina) Carlos Sánchez (2006)
