= Niclas Elving =

Swedish footballer

Personal information
- Full name: Jan Niclas Elving
- Date of birth: 6 February 1986 (age 40)
- Place of birth: Sweden
- Position: Midfielder

Youth career
- Nol IK

Senior career*
Years	Team	Apps	(Gls)
2006–2009	Gunnilse IS		
2009–2011	Örgryte IS	12	(1)
2011	Ahlafors IF		
2012	Gunnilse IS	22	(7)
2012–2014	Ahlafors IF		
2014	C.D. Walter Ferretti	18	(1)
2014	Ahlafors IF		
- * Club domestic league appearances and goals

Niclas Elving (alternatively spelled Nicklas Elving or Niclas Elfving; born 6 February 1986) is a Swedish former professional footballer. A left-footed offensive midfielder, he can also operate on the wings. Besides Sweden, he has played in Nicaragua.

== Nicaragua ==
Concluding a transfer to C.D. Walter Ferretti of the Nicaraguan Primera División in January 2014 after impressing their coach, Elving debuted in their second round meeting Real Madriz and fared well, forming a duo with frontman Javier Dolmus by supplying him with assists near the end of the season.

Experienced the cataclysmic April 2014 Nicaragua earthquake while in Managua.

Comparing the league in Nicaragua to the Swedish Superettan, he stated that football there is very physical.

== Personal life ==
Elving idolizes Ronaldinho as well as retired Swedish international Marcus Allbäck.
