= Douglas Caé =

Brazilian footballer (born 1987)

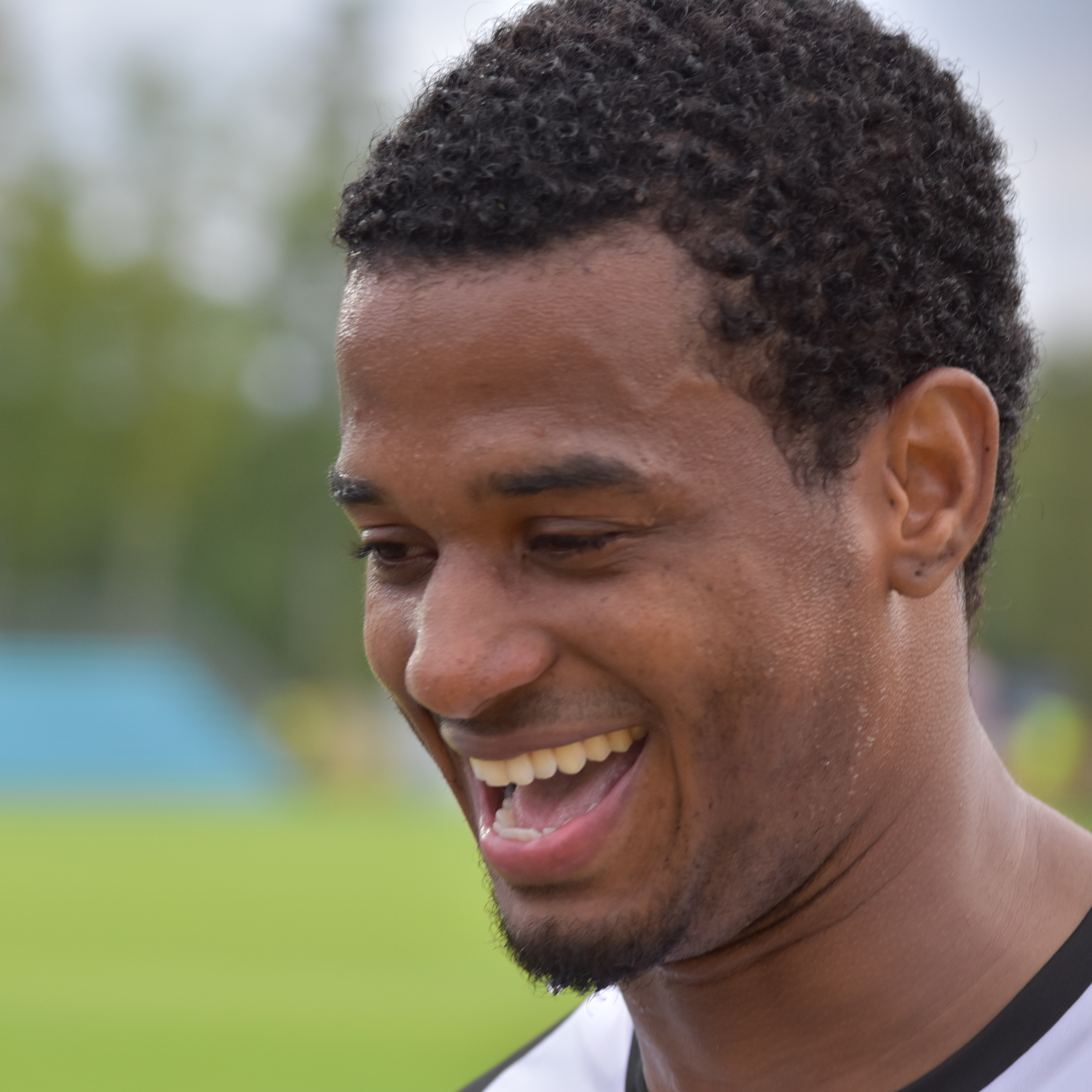
- Caé with VPS in 2018.

Personal information
- Full name: Douglas de Almeida Caé da Conceição
- Date of birth: 24 October 1987 (age 39)
- Position: Striker

Team information
- Current team: Real Estelí
- Number: 20

Senior career*
Years	Team	Apps	(Gls)
2011	Fluminense de Feira	17	(3)
2012	Central	8	(0)
2012	Santos (AP)	6	(2)
2013	Joseense	16	(4)
2013	Walter Ormeño	7	(3)
2015	Madureira	0	(0)
2015–2016	Resende	10	(1)
2017	AA Portuguesa	3	(0)
2018–2019	VPS	32	(6)
2019–2020	Al Jeel		
2019	Real Estelí	17	(15)
2020	Anapolina	3	(0)
2020-2022	Gnistan	51	(29)
2022-	Real Estelí	16	(8)
- * Club domestic league appearances and goals as of 18:21, 10 January 2023 (UTC)

Douglas de Almeida Caé da Conceição (born 24 October 1987) is a Brazilian professional footballer who plays as a striker for Real Estelí.
