= ART Municipal Jalapa =

Association football club in Nicaragua

- Full name: ART Municipal Jalapa
- Founded: 2011
- Ground: Estadio Alejandro Ramos; Jalapa, Nicaragua
- Capacity: 1,000
- Chairman: Jorge Galeano
- Manager: Leónidas Rodríguez
- League: Liga Primera
- 2024–25: TBD
Home colours	Away colours

ART Municipal Jalapa is a Nicaraguan football team playing at the top level. It is based in Jalapa.

They currently play in the Primera División, playing their home matches at the 1,000 Estadio Alejandro Ramos.

== History ==
After the demise of Deportivo Jalapa in 2007, a new club was formed in 2011 naming themselves Municipal Jalapa ART. The club won both the 2012 Apertura and 2013 Clausura title to earn promotion to the first division for the first time in their history and the first time a team from Jalapa appeared in the Primera division in six years.

In their very first season, despite only having one foreign player in Honduran Luis Maradiaga, the club was able to finish in fifth place just missing the semi-final spot by 2 points.

== Achievements ==
- Segunda División de Nicaragua: 2
  2012 Apertura, 2013 Clausura

== Current squad ==
As of: July 2026 Note: Flags indicate national team as defined under FIFA eligibility rules; some limited exceptions apply. Players may hold more than one non-FIFA nationality.

No.	Pos.	Nation	Player
1	GK	NCA	Gerald Galeano
3		NCA	Gerson Ramos
4		NCA	Luis Baltodano
6		NCA	Cristian Ramos
7		NCA	Marvin Barahona
8		NCA	Carlos Jiron
9		NCA	Kleyber Gonzalez
10		NCA	Juan Marin
11		NCA	Darwin Corrales
12		NCA	Oscar Villalobos
13		NCA	Adrian Gomez
14		NCA	Yeffran Benavides
17		COL	Jhan Cuero
18		NCA	Patrick Luna
19		NCA	Holman Lira
22		NCA	Victor Carcamo
24		NCA	Bayron Salinas
25	GK	ESP	Walid Birrou
28		NCA	Raymond Moncada
46		NCA	Nery Huete
50		NCA	Jeffer Fajardo

No.	Pos.	Nation	Player
GK		NCA	Danny Rosales
—		NCA	
—		NCA	Edwin Castro
—		NCA	Bruno Caceres
—		NCA	Giancarlos Canas
—		NCA	Jose Loaisiga
—		NCA	Jesser Herrera
—		NCA	Fernando Jarquin

=== Players with dual citizenship ===
- (Costa Rica) (Nicaragua) TBD

=== Out on loan ===
Note: Flags indicate national team as defined under FIFA eligibility rules; some limited exceptions apply. Players may hold more than one non-FIFA nationality.

No.	Pos.	Nation	Player
—			

=== In ===
Note: Flags indicate national team as defined under FIFA eligibility rules; some limited exceptions apply. Players may hold more than one non-FIFA nationality.

No.	Pos.	Nation	Player
—		NCA	Bryan Ordonez (From Juventus Managua)
—	GK	ESP	Walid Birrou (From KS Pogradeci)
—		NCA	Darwin Corrales (From TBD)
—		NCA	Luis Baltodano (From TBD)

No.	Pos.	Nation	Player
—	DF	COL	Jhan Cuero (From TBD)
—		NCA	TBD (From TBD)
—		NCA	TBD (From TBD)
—		NCA	TBD (From TBD)

=== Out ===
Note: Flags indicate national team as defined under FIFA eligibility rules; some limited exceptions apply. Players may hold more than one non-FIFA nationality.

No.	Pos.	Nation	Player
—		CUB	Alejandro Delgado (To Club Sport Sebaco)
—		CUB	Ismel Morgado (To Club Sport Sebaco)
—		BOL	Fernando Saldías (To TBD)
—		HON	Oscar Rosales (To TBD)

No.	Pos.	Nation	Player
—		NCA	David Rodriguez (To TBD)
—		NCA	Axell Caceres (To TBD)
—		NCA	TBD (To TBD)

== Personnel ==
=== Current technical staff ===
As of January, 2026

Position	Staff
Manager	(Colombia) Luis Javier Londoño
Assistant Manager	(Nicaragua) TBD
Physical coach	(Nicaragua) Steven Laguana
Goalkeeper Coach	(Nicaragua) Danny Lopez
Physiotherapist	(Nicaragua) Lazaro Laza
Team Doctor	(Nicaragua) TBD
Under 20 coach	(Nicaragua) Geovanny Vallejos
Utility coach	(Nicaragua) Leyvin Lopez

== List of managers ==
- (Nicaragua) Leonidas Rodríguez (2012 – December 2014)
- (Nicaragua) Tyrone Acevedo (January 2015– January 2016)
- (El Salvador) Ángel Orellana (Jan 2016-)
- (Nicaragua) Leonidas Rodríguez (2017- October 2019)
- (El Salvador) Angel Orellana (October 2019 - May 2020)
- (Argentina) Carlos Javier Martino (May 2020 - April 2021)
- (Nicaragua) Leonidas Rodríguez (May 2021 - December 2021)
- (Honduras) Jose Ramon Romero (December 2021 - March 2022)
- (Honduras) Hector Medina (April - June 2022)
- (Colombia) Luis Londono (June 2022 - December 2022)
- (Argentina) Carlos Javier Martino (December 2022 - April 2023)
- (Nicaragua) Ricardo Gaitan (April 2023 - September 2023)
- (Honduras) Julian Serrano Cruz (September 2023 - December 2023)
- (Nicaragua) Tyrone Acevedo (December 2023 - December 2024)
- (Colombia) Jairo Basabe (January 2025 - August 2025)
- (Nicaragua) Danny Rosales Interim (August 2025 - Present)
- (Colombia) Luis Javier Londoño (September 2025 - Present)
