= Gerardo Aguilar (footballer) =

Mexican footballer (born 1990)

Personal information
- Full name: Gerardo Aguilar Sainz
- Date of birth: 28 March 1990 (age 36)
- Place of birth: Orizaba, Mexico
- Height: 1.67 m (5 ft 6 in)
- Position: Midfielder

Senior career*
Years	Team	Apps	(Gls)
2014	Celaya	17	(0)
2017	Real Estelí	19	(1)
- * Club domestic league appearances and goals

Gerardo Aguilar Sainz (born 28 March 1990) is a Mexican former footballer, who played in midfield for Real Estelí FC. He was born in Orizaba, Veracruz and was brought up in Saltillo, Coahuila.

== Career ==
=== Second Division ===
Gerardo Aguilar Sainz began his professional career in 2007 in the Second Division of the Mexican Football League, playing for Club Deportivo Chivas, when the team twice became divisional champion. In 2009, he moved to Real Saltillo Soccer Club, with which he remained until 2011, scoring 8 goals. He played for Querétaro F.C. in 2011 and 2012, scoring 3 goals. In 2012, he moved to Deportivo Tepic F.C., in the Liga Premier de Ascenso, part of the Second Division, and scored 3 goals while there.

=== Ascenso MX ===
Aguilar moved up one tier in 2014 when he transferred to Club de Futbol Celaya, playing twice in the Copa MX and scoring one goal.

=== Loros de la Universidad de Colima ===
In 2015 Aguilar moved to the Second Division team Loros de la Universidad de Colima. The team won promotion to the Ascenso MX league that same year.

=== Real Estelí Fútbol Club ===
Aguilar is currently playing for the Nicaraguan First Division team Real Estelí Fútbol Club. Real Estelí is one of the two top Nicaraguan teams, along with Diriangén FC. Matches between the two teams are known as the "National Classic" (Spanish: el clásico nacional).

== International competitions ==
- Copa Dallas 2007
- Copa Gradisca (Italy) 2007
- Copa Promissao (Brazil) 2007
- Copa Internacional Chivas 2008 - champions
