= Nahúm Gómez =

Mexican footballer (born 1998)

Personal information
- Full name: Nahúm Gómez del Rosal
- Date of birth: 19 January 1998 (age 28)
- Place of birth: Huejutla de Reyes, Mexico
- Height: 1.65 m (5 ft 5 in)
- Position: Midfielder

Team information
- Current team: Correcaminos
- Number: 12

Youth career
- 2013–2016: Pachuca

Senior career*
Years	Team	Apps	(Gls)
2016–2020	Pachuca	0	(0)
2016–2017	→ Everton (loan)	6	(0)
2019–2020	→ Tlaxcala (loan)	17	(4)
2020	→ Celaya (loan)	17	(3)
2021–2022	Tampico Madero	42	(1)
2022–2025	Atlético La Paz	12	(1)
2025	Real Estelí FC	11	(1)
2026–	Correcaminos	8	(3)

International career
2015	Mexico U17	5	(0)
- * Club domestic league appearances and goals as of 9 March 2026

Nahúm Gómez del Rosal (born 19 January 1998) is a Mexican professional footballer who plays as a midfielder for Liga de Expansión MX club Correcaminos.

== Career ==
Ahead of the 2019–20 season, Gómez joined Tlaxcala.
