= Deportivo Ocotal =

Nicaraguan football club

- Full name: Club Deportivo Ocotal
- Nicknames: Los Guerreros de las Segovias; Gallos Segovianos
- Founded: 2002
- Ground: Estadio Glorias del Beisbol Segoviano/ Roy Fernando Bermúdez; Ocotal, Nicaragua
- Capacity: 5,000
- Chairman: Oscar Mendoza
- Manager: Mario Alfaro
- League: Liga Primera
- 2024–25: TBD
Home colours	Away colours

Club Deportivo Ocotal is a Nicaraguan football team playing at the top level. They are located in Ocotal near to the Honduras border.

== Honours ==
=== Domestic honours ===
==== Leagues ====
- Segunda División de Nicaragua and predecessors
  - Champions (1): 2016–2017

== Rivalries ==
=== Clásico de las Segovias ===
The club's nearest neighbour is Real Madriz from Somoto, a rivalry being shared between fans of both football teams.

== Current squad ==
As of: 19 January 2025 Note: Flags indicate national team as defined under FIFA eligibility rules; some limited exceptions apply. Players may hold more than one non-FIFA nationality.

No.	Pos.	Nation	Player
—		NCA	TBD (captain)
—		NCA	TBD
—		NCA	TBD
—		NCA	TBD
—		NCA	TBD
—		NCA	TBD
—		NCA	TBD
—		NCA	TBD

No.	Pos.	Nation	Player
—		NCA	TBD
—		NCA	TBD
—		NCA	TBD
—		NCA	TBD
—		NCA	TBD

=== In ===
Note: Flags indicate national team as defined under FIFA eligibility rules; some limited exceptions apply. Players may hold more than one non-FIFA nationality.

No.	Pos.	Nation	Player
—		URU	Cristian Olivera (From TBD)
—		ARG	Ale Corvalan (From TBD)
—		SLV	Juan Sánchez (From TBD)

No.	Pos.	Nation	Player
—		NCA	TBD (From TBD)
—		NCA	TBD (From TBD)
—		NCA	TBD (From TBD)

=== Out ===
Note: Flags indicate national team as defined under FIFA eligibility rules; some limited exceptions apply. Players may hold more than one non-FIFA nationality.

No.	Pos.	Nation	Player
—		HON	Gabriel Ortiz (To TBD)
—		HON	Oscar Rosales (To TBD)
—		NCA	Kevin Castro (To TBD)
—		NCA	Eliam Flores] (To TBD)
—		NCA	Wilder Wilson (To TBD)

No.	Pos.	Nation	Player
—		NCA	Jared Fortin (Banned by FENIFUT)
—		NCA	Jhon Mairena (Banned by FENIFUT)
—		NCA	Edry Centeno (Banned by FENIFUT)
—		NCA	Samuel Padilla (Banned by FENIFUT)

== Personnel ==
=== Current technical staff ===
Position	
Head coach	(Spain) Kevin Vidaña Sánchez
Assistant coach	(Nicaragua) TBD
Goalkeeping coach	(Nicaragua) TBD
Fitness coach	(Nicaragua) TBD
Under 20 coach	(Nicaragua) TBD
Under 20 Assistant coach	(Nicaragua) TBD
Physio	(Nicaragua) TBD
Massagist	(Nicaragua) TBD
Team Doctor	(Nicaragua) TBD
Utility	(Nicaragua) TBD

-->

=== Management ===
Position	Staff
President	Nestor Agurcia Perrot
Honorary President	Edward Centeno Gadea Centeno
Legal Representative and representative to Managua	lic. Guillermo Alemán.
Secretary of the Board	Julio Aguiera Irias
responsible for international transfers	Wilver Ariel Enriquez Funes
Treasurer	Rolando Lopez Muñoz

== List of managers ==
Ocotal has had permanent managers since it first appointed Randal Moreno as coach in 2003. The longest serving manager was Randall Moreno, who managed Ocotal for three years from 2003 to Jan 2005. Panamanian Carlos Walcott was the foreign coach in the club.

Dates	Name
2003–05	(Nicaragua) Randal Moreno
2006	(Nicaragua) Ariel Moreno
2007	(Nicaragua) Jorge Fonseca
2008–09	(Nicaragua) Mario José Alfaro Mercado
January 2010 – July 2010	(Nicaragua) Leonidas Rodríguez
August 2010 – November 2012	(Nicaragua) Vidal Alonso
January 2011 – February 2012	(Nicaragua) Omar Zambrana
February 2012 – July 2012	(Panama) Carlos Walcott
July 2012 – August 2012	(Honduras) Florentino Colindres
August 2012 – February 2013	(Honduras) Sindulios Castellano
March 2013 – December 2013	(Nicaragua) Mario José Alfaro Mercado
December 2013 – February 2014	(El Salvador) Angel Orellana
February 2014 – August 2014	(Nicaragua) Randall Moreno
August 2014 – February 2015	(Nicaragua) Eduardo Alonso
February 2015 – July 2015	(El Salvador) Juan Ramon Trejo
July 2015 – September 2015	(Argentina) Roberto Chanampe
September 2015 – October 2015	(Honduras) Airon Reyes García
Oct 2015 – Dec 2015	(Nicaragua) Flavio Vanegas
December 2015– February 2016	(Colombia) Javier Reales
February 2016 – June 2016	(El Salvador) Juan Ramon Trejo
June 2016 – June 2017	(Nicaragua) Randall Moreno
July 2017 – December 2017	(Argentina) Emiliano Barrera
January 2018 – April 2018	(Honduras) Carlos Cardona
April 2018 – June 2018	(Nicaragua) Randall Moreno
July 2018 – December 2018	(Nicaragua) Jorge Luis Vanegas
December 2018– October 2019	(Nicaragua) Mario Alfaro
October 2019 – October 2020	(Honduras) Marcos Rivera (Interim)
October 2019 – May 2020	(Honduras) Reynaldo Clavasquín
May 2020 – December 2020	(Honduras) Elvin Díaz
January 2021 - June 2022	(Nicaragua) Mario Alfaro
June 2022 - December 2022	(Honduras) Nelson Vásquez
January 2023 - August 2023	(Nicaragua) Sting Lopez
September 2023 - December 2023	(Nicaragua) Juan Pastrana
January 2024 - June 2024	(Honduras) Nelson Vásquez
July 2024 - October 2024	(Nicaragua) Ricardo Gaitan
October 2024 - Present	(Spain) Kevin Vidaña Sánchez

== Jersey sponsors ==
- La Cabra Sport
