= Alfonso Quesada =

Costa Rican footballer (born 1988)

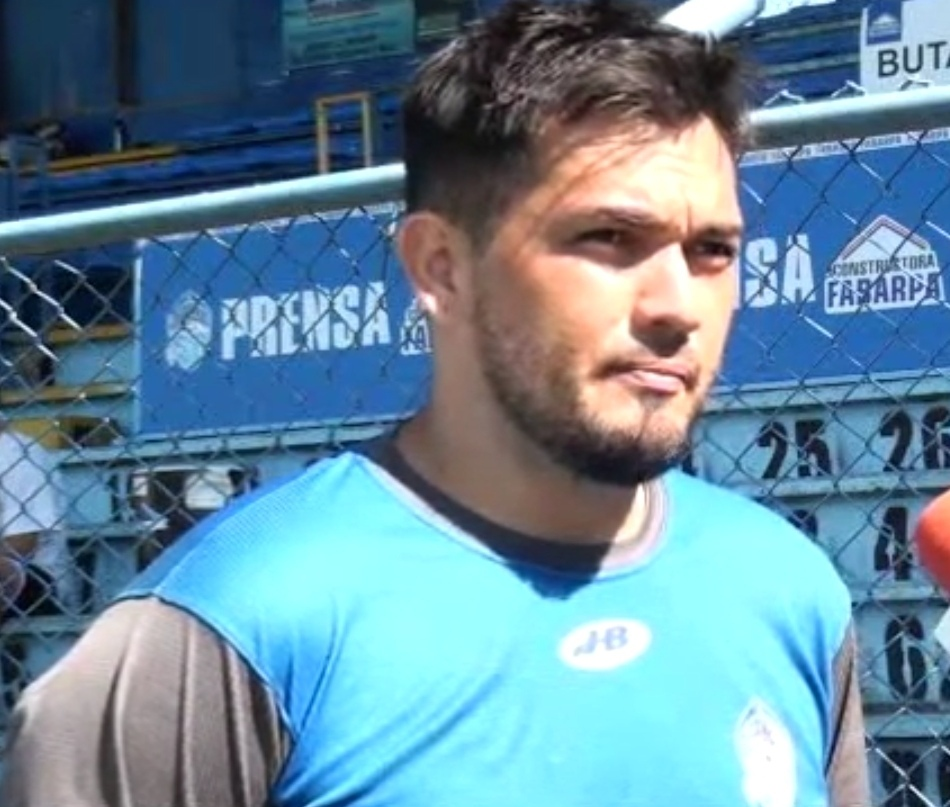
- Alfonso Quesada Ramírez in an interview in 2018

Personal information
- Full name: Alfonso Quesada Ramírez
- Date of birth: 15 March 1988 (age 38)
- Place of birth: Ciudad Quesada, Costa Rica
- Height: 1.88 m (6 ft 2 in)
- Position: Goalkeeper

Team information
- Current team: AD Rosario

Youth career
- Alajuelense

Senior career*
Years	Team	Apps	(Gls)
2006–2007	Barbate CF	4	(0)
2007–2008	UCR	1	(0)
2009–2017	Alajuelense	57	(2)
2017	San Carlos	6	(0)
2017	AD Cofutpa		
2018	Pérez Zeledón	20	(0)
2018–2019	San Carlos	0	(0)
2020	AD Rosario		
2021-2022	Municipal Grecia	37	
2023-2024	Diriangén FC	52	(1)
2025-Present	Santa Ana	7	(0)

International career
2005	Costa Rica U-17	3	(0)
2007	Costa Rica U-20		
- * Club domestic league appearances and goals as of 7 May 2018

Alfonso Quesada Ramírez (born March 15, 1988) is a Costa Rican goalkeeper who currently plays for AD Rosario.

== Club career ==
Quesada came through the Alajuelense youth system and had a season at Spanish Third division side Barbate CF.

Quesada made his Costa Rican league debut for Universidad on 5 August 2007 against Carmelita. He joined Alajuelense in summer 2009.

At the end of December 2019 it was confirmed, that Quesada would join AD Rosario on 1 January 2020.

== International career ==
Quesada has played for Costa Rica at the 2005 FIFA U-17 World Championship and 2007 FIFA U-20 World Cup.
