= Juan Cortés (football manager) =

Spanish football manager (born 1983)

Personal information
- Full name: Juan Cortés Diéguez
- Date of birth: 5 November 1983 (age 42)
- Place of birth: Jaén, Spain

Team information
- Current team: Persijap Jepara

Managerial career
- Years: Team
- 2012–2013: PD Jiennense
- 2013–2014: Jaén (youth)
- 2014–2015: Pattaya United
- 2015–2016: Tosiria (youth)
- 2016: Cinco Estrellas
- 2017: Olimpia de Itá
- 2018: Martos
- 2019: Independiente
- 2020: Once Deportivo
- 2020: Alianza
- 2021: Isidro Metapán
- 2021–2022: Managua
- 2022: Santa Lucía
- 2023: Platense
- 2024: El Salvador U20
- 2025: Matagalpa
- 2025: Hyper Valinhos
- 2025: Real Tomayapo
- 2026: CSKA Pamir Dushanbe
- 2026: San Antonio Bulo Bulo
- 2026–: Persijap Jepara

Juan Cortés Diéguez (born 5 November 1983) is a Spanish football manager for Super League club Persijap Jepara.

== Early life ==
He was born in 1983 in Spain. He studied business administration and management.

== Career ==
In 2014, he was appointed manager of Thai side Pattaya United. In 2017, he was appointed manager of Paraguayan side Olimpia de Itá. In 2018, he was appointed manager of Spanish side Martos CD. In 2019, he was appointed manager of Salvadoran side Independiente. In 2020, he was appointed manager of Salvadoran side Once Deportivo. After that, he was appointed manager of Salvadoran side Alianza. In 2021, he was appointed manager of Salvadoran side Isidro Metapán. After that, he was appointed manager of Nicaraguan side Managua FC. After that, he was appointed manager of Guatemalan side Santa Lucía. In 2023, he was appointed manager of Salvadoran side Platense. In 2024, he was appointed manager of the El Salvador national under-20 football team. He has been described as "earned a name in CONCACAF football".

On 7 January 2026, Tajikistan Higher League club CSKA Pamir Dushanbe announced the appointment of Cortés as their new head coach. On 16 March, however, he returned to Bolivia with San Antonio Bulo Bulo.

== Personal life ==
He is a native of Andalusia, Spain. He has worked as a manager educator.
