= Taufic Guarch =

Mexican footballer (born 1991)

Personal information
- Full name: Taufic Eduardo Guarch Rubio
- Date of birth: 4 October 1991 (age 35)
- Place of birth: Guadalajara, Jalisco, Mexico
- Height: 1.83 m (6 ft 0 in)
- Positions: Forward; winger

Team information
- Current team: Matagalpa FC

Youth career
- 2004–2009: Estudiantes Tecos

Senior career*
Years	Team	Apps	(Gls)
2009–2014	Estudiantes Tecos	47	(3)
2011	→ Espanyol B (loan)	11	(2)
2012–2013	→ Tigres UANL (loan)	5	(0)
2014	→ Mérida (loan)	5	(0)
2015–2016	Tlaxcala	42	(15)
2016–2017	Pioneros de Cancún	35	(9)
2017–2019	Oaxaca	52	(2)
2019	Atlante	7	(0)
2019–2020	Real Estelí	21	(5)
2020	Walter Ferretti	19	(4)
2021	Tlaxcala	16	(1)
2021–2022	Walter Ferretti	39	(6)
2022	Diriangén FC	18	(1)
2023	Managua FC	20	(5)
2023	Chapulineros de Oaxaca	0	(0)
2024–	Matagalpa FC	20	(5)

International career
2011	Mexico U20	12	(6)
Medal record
Representing Mexico
Winner	CONCACAF U-20 Championship	2011
Third place	FIFA U-20 World Cup	2011
- * Club domestic league appearances and goals as of 13 December 2021

Taufic Eduardo Guarch Rubio (Note: In this Spanish name, the first or paternal surname is Guarch and the second or maternal family name is Rubio.) (born 4 October 1991) is a Mexican professional footballer who plays as a forward or winger for Liga Primera club Diriangén FC.

== Club career ==
=== Estudiantes Tecos ===
Guarch debuted on the Torneo Apertura 2010, assisted 2 passes for goal in 10 appearances during this tournament. On the Torneo Clausura 2011 he appeared in 7 matches and gave one assist for goal.

=== Espanyol B ===
On August 30, 2011, Guarch joined Espanyol B on a season long loan.

== International career ==
Guarch scored his first international goal for Mexico at the 2011 FIFA U-20 World Cup in Colombia on August 1, 2011, against North Korea, in the 54th minute.

During 2014, in awake of Lebanon's elimination in 2014 WC and 2015 Asian Cup qualifying, manager Giuseppe Giannini decided to contact to the Lebanese diaspora players from outside Lebanon. Taufic was captured by Giannini and his performance might have one day he will serve for Lebanese team.

== Personal life ==
Guarch is of Lebanese descent.

== Career statistics ==
As of 13 May 2024

Appearances and goals by club, season and competition
Club	Season	League			Cup		Continental		Total	
Club	Season	Division	Apps	Goals	Apps	Goals	Apps	Goals	Apps	Goals
Tecos	2010–11	Liga MX	18	0	—		—		18	0
Tecos	2013–14	Liga MX	28	3	8	1	—		36	4
Tecos	Total		46	3	8	1	0	0	54	4
Espanyol B (loan)	2011–12	Spanish Tercera División	11	2	—		—		11	2
Tigres UANL (loan)	2012–13	Liga MX	5	0	—		5 (Note: Appearances in CONCACAF Champions League)	1	10	1
Mérida (loan)	2014–15	Ascenso MX	5	0	5	0	—		10	0
Tlaxcala	2015–16	Ascenso MX	42	15	—		—		42	15
Cancún	2016–17	Ascenso MX	37	9	—		—		37	9
Oaxaca	2017–18	Ascenso MX	32	1	7	1	—		39	2
Oaxaca	2018–19	Ascenso MX	20	1	6	0	—		26	1
Oaxaca	Total		52	2	13	1	0	0	66	3
Atlante	2019–20	Ascenso MX	7	0	1	0	—		8	0
Real Estelí	2019–20	Nicaraguan Primera Division	21	5	—		—		21	5
Walter Ferretti	2020–21	Nicaraguan Primera Division	19	4	—		—		19	4
Tlaxcala	2020–21	Liga de Expansión MX	16	1	—		—		16	1
Walter Ferretti	2021–22	Nicaraguan Primera Division	39	6	—		—		39	6
Diriangén	2022–23	Nicaraguan Primera Division	18	1	—		4 (Note: Appearances in CONCACAF League)	0	22	1
Managua	2022–23	Nicaraguan Primera Division	20	5	—		—		20	5
Matagalpa	2023–24	Nicaraguan Primera Division	17	2	—		—		17	2
Career total			355	55	27	2	9	1	391	58

== Honours ==
Mexico U20

- FIFA U-20 World Cup 3rd Place: 2011
- CONCACAF Under-20 Championship: 2011
