= Mauricio Cruz =

Nicaraguan footballer (born 1957)

Personal information
- Full name: Mauricio Antonio Cruz Jiron
- Date of birth: March 11, 1957 (age 69)
- Place of birth: Nicaragua
- Height: 1.70 m (5 ft 7 in)
- Position: Striker

Senior career*
| Years | Team | Apps | (Gls) |
| 1973–1982 | Diriangén FC | | (170) |
| 1980–1981 | Chicago Horizons (Indoor) | 24 | (7) |
| 1983 | Universidad | | |
| 1984–1992 | Diriangén FC | | |

International career
| 1973–1992 | Nicaragua | | |

Managerial career
- 1993–2001: Nicaragua
- 1992–2006: Diriangén
- 2008: Nicaragua
- 2008–2010: Diriangén
- 2017–2019: Diriangen
- 2021–2022: Deportivo Walter Ferretti
- * Club domestic league appearances and goals

Mauricio Antonio Cruz Jiron (born 11 March 1957) is a former Nicaraguan footballer who currently coaches CD Walter Ferretti in the Primera División de Nicaragua.

== Club career ==
During his career he played for Diriangén and Honduran outfit Universidad.

== International career ==
Cruz made his debut for Nicaragua in the 1970s and represented his country in 2 FIFA World Cup qualification matches, both in 1992 versus El Salvador. Cruz represented Nicaragua at the 1975 Pan American Games.

His final international was a July 1992 FIFA World Cup qualification match against El Salvador.

== Managerial career ==
He has been national team manager during 1998 and 2002 FIFA World Cup qualification matches and again during a short 2010 FIFA World Cup qualification spell in 2008. Cruz took charge of Diriangén again in summer 2008 after he had left them in 2006.

== Personal life ==
He has a brother named Donaldo Jiron.
