= Rancho Santana FC =

Association football club in Nicaragua

Rancho Santana
- Full name: Rancho Santana Fútbol Club
- Nickname: Naranja Mecánica
- Founded: 2015
- Ground: Campo Fun Limon; Tola, Nicaragua
- Capacity: 1,000
- Manager: Jonathan Orellana
- League: Liga Primera
Home colours

Rancho Santana Fútbol Club is a Nicaraguan football team playing in the second division of the Nicaragua football system. It is based in Tola.

== History ==
The club was founded in 2015 in the city of Tola, Rivas, In 2023 became the first team from the Rivas region in the modern era to win promotion to the Liga Primera de Nicaragua after defeating Juventus Managua.

They became the second team from Rivas region after ENAG did it previously 1960/1961.

== Honours ==
- Segunda División de Nicaragua and predecessors
  - Champions (1): 2024 Clausura

== Sponsors ==
- Hertz
- Sporade
- Agua Roca
- Cielo
- Easy MD

== Current squad ==
As of July 25, 2026 Note: Flags indicate national team as defined under FIFA eligibility rules; some limited exceptions apply. Players may hold more than one non-FIFA nationality.

No.	Pos.	Nation	Player
2	DF	NCA	Yader Zamora
3	DF	CRC	Juan Carlos Amador
4	DF	CRC	Axel Bustos
5	MF	CRC	Shaquil Vargas
6	DF	BRA	Rafael Vieira
7	MF	NCA	Nasser Jirón
8	MF	NCA	Mynor Bustos
9	FW	NCA	Izamuel Martínez
10	FW	MEX	Taufic Guarch
11	FW	NCA	Francisco Calero
12	DF	CRC	Joshua Cayasso
13	GK	NCA	Fernando Moreno
14	MF	NCA	Jeffry López

No.	Pos.	Nation	Player
15	DF	NCA	Fernando Parrales
16	MF	NCA	William España
17	MF	CRC	Miguel Tercero
18	MF	CRC	Justin Saez
19	DF	COL	Óscar Mieles
20	FW	NCA	Pablo Gállego
21	FW	CRC	Iverson Salmerón
22	FW	NCA	Leonardo Bonilla
25	GK	CRC	Bryan Cordero
30	DF	COL	Jhans Mina
52	MF	NCA	Bladimir Calero
56	MF	NCA	Saúl Mejía

=== Players with dual citizenship ===
- (Nicaragua) (Costa Rica) Nasser Jirón
- (Nicaragua) (Costa Rica) Joshua Cayasso
- (Nicaragua) (Costa Rica) Iverson Salmerón
- (Nicaragua) (Costa Rica) Miguel Tercero
- (Nicaragua) (Spain) Pablo Gállego

=== In ===
Note: Flags indicate national team as defined under FIFA eligibility rules; some limited exceptions apply. Players may hold more than one non-FIFA nationality.

No.	Pos.	Nation	Player
—		NCA	Joshua Cayasso (From Tigres)
—	DF	CRC	Axel Bustos (From AD Cofutpa)
—		NCA	Iverson Salmerón (From Santa Ana FC)
—	GK	CRC	Bryan Cordero (From Santa Ana FC)
—		CRC	Justin Saenz (From Deportivo Upala FC)

No.	Pos.	Nation	Player
—		NCA	Nasser Jirón (From Bravos de Primavera)
—		NCA	Izamuel Martínez (From Burnaby FC)
—		NCA	Shaquil Vargas (From TBD)
—		NCA	Pablo Gállego (From TBD)

=== Out ===
Note: Flags indicate national team as defined under FIFA eligibility rules; some limited exceptions apply. Players may hold more than one non-FIFA nationality.

No.	Pos.	Nation	Player
—		NCA	Axel Velazquez (To TBD)
—		NCA	Bryant Roman (To TBD)
—	GK	NCA	Kevin Garcia (To TBD)
—		NCA	Axel Campos (To TBD)
—		CRC	Luigui Muñoz (To TBD)
—		NCA	Marcelo Cruz (To TBD)

No.	Pos.	Nation	Player
—		COL	Will Robledo (To TBD)
—		NCA	Adrian Chavarria (To TBD)
—		NCA	Gyuillermo Morales (To TBD)
—		NCA	Luis Baltodano (To TBD)
—		NCA	Ismael Mendieta (To TBD)
—		NCA	Luis Gaitan (To TBD)

== Coaching staff ==
As of September, 2025

Position	Staff
Manager	(Nicaragua) Mauricio Cruz
Assistant Manager	(Nicaragua) Pablo Castro
Physical coach	(El Salvador) Jairo Diaz
Goalkeeper Coach	(Nicaragua) TBD
Physiotherapist	(Nicaragua) Claudio Cartenes
Team Doctor	(Nicaragua) TBD
Under 20 coach	(Nicaragua) German Salinas

== List of coaches ==
- (Nicaragua) Milton Busto (- June 2024)
- (Argentina) Carlos Javier Martino (July 2024 - November 2024)
- (Argentina) Cristian Taberna (Interim) (November 2024 - December 2024)
- (Chile) Jonathan Orellana (January 2025 – May 2025)
- (Argentina) Cristian Taberna (Interim) (May 2025 – July 2025)
- (Argentina) Alexis Sanchez (July 2025 – August)
- (Brazil) Flavio da Silva (August 2025 – September 2025)
- (Nicaragua) Mauricio Cruz (September 2025 – present)

== See also ==
- Segunda División de Nicaragua
