= Johan Padilla =

Ecuadorian footballer (born 1992)

Personal information
- Full name: Johan David Padilla Quiñónez
- Date of birth: 14 August 1992 (age 34)
- Place of birth: Esmeraldas, Ecuador
- Height: 1.85 m (6 ft 1 in)
- Position: Goalkeeper

Youth career
- –2010: Independiente del Valle

Senior career*
Years	Team	Apps	(Gls)
2010–2015	Independiente del Valle	15	(0)
2016–2017	S.D. Aucas	15	(0)
2017	→ América de Quito (loan)	0	(0)
2017–2020	C.D. El Nacional	115	(0)
2020–2021	Delfín S.C.	20	(0)
2022	C.S.D. Macará	24	(0)

International career
2019	Ecuador	3	(0)
- * Club domestic league appearances and goals as of 00:15 (UTC) 1 April 2024

Johan David Padilla Quiñónez (born 14 August 1992) is an Ecuadorean former footballer who played as a goalkeeper for the Ecuador national football team.

== Career ==
He initially come through at Independiente del Valle where he played for five years. He had a short spell at S.D. Aucas and spelt time on loan at América de Quito in 2017. He joined C.D. El Nacional and played for the team in the Copa Libertadores 2017, the Copa Sudamericana 2018 and the Copa Sudamericana 2019. He signed for Delfin from C.D. El Nacional in October 2020 after he left them on a free transfer after claiming they owed him five months wages. He played for C.S.D. Macará in 2022. After leaving the club he spoke about being accused of match fixing, and denied the claims.

== International career ==
He made his national team debut on September 11, 2019, in a 3–0 win against Bolivia. He received further caps starting against Colombia and Trinidad and Tobago.
