= Club Sport Sebaco =

Association football club in Nicaragua

- Full name: Club Sport Sebaco
- Founded: 2018
- Ground: Estadio Municipal El Colosal; Sebaco, Nicaragua
- Capacity: 1,000
- Head coach: Sergio Ivan Rodriguez
- League: Nicaraguan Primera División
- 2024–25: TBD
Home colours	Away colours

Club Sport Sébaco is a Nicaraguan professional football club currently playing in the Nicaraguan Primera División. They are based in Sebaco.

== History ==
The club was founded in 2018 as H&H Export Sébaco FC. The club was founded to replace the defunct team Deportivo Sébaco. In 2021, Sébaco won promotion to the Primera Division for the very first time by defeating Chinandega FC in a promotion relegation playoff 5–3 on aggregate. In 2022, the club changed its name from H&H Export Sébaco FC to Club Sport Sebaco.

== Achievements ==
- Segunda División de Nicaragua: 1
  Liga de Ascenso: 2021 Clausura

== Current squad ==
As of: 19 January 2026 Note: Flags indicate national team as defined under FIFA eligibility rules; some limited exceptions apply. Players may hold more than one non-FIFA nationality.

No.	Pos.	Nation	Player
—		NCA	TBD (captain)
1	GK	NCA	Jakobby Madrid
9		NCA	Bryan Ordóñez
13	GK	CUB	Ismel Morgado
18		NCA	Winston Herrera
21		NCA	Ocnarpz Rodríguez
31	GK	NCA	Mario Castro
41		NCA	Greyvin Yohandy
—		NCA	TBD
—		NCA	TBD

No.	Pos.	Nation	Player
—		NCA	TBD
—		NCA	TBD
—		NCA	TBD
—		NCA	TBD
—		NCA	TBD

=== In ===
Note: Flags indicate national team as defined under FIFA eligibility rules; some limited exceptions apply. Players may hold more than one non-FIFA nationality.

No.	Pos.	Nation	Player
—		NCA	Bryan Ordonez (From Juventus Managua)
—	GK	NCA	Jakobby Madrid (From Real Esteli)
—		NCA	Fredman Kirland (From Real Esteli)
—	FW	CUB	Alejandro Delgado (From ART Jalapa)
—		NCA	Norman Zambrana (From Real Esteli)
—		NCA	Engel sanchez (From Juventus Managua)
—	GK	CUB	Ismel Morgado (From ART Jalapa)

No.	Pos.	Nation	Player
—		NCA	Willian Palacios (From TBD)
—		NCA	Modesto AGurcia (From Real Madriz)
—		NCA	TBD (From TBD)
—		NCA	Eddy Nicoya (From TBD)
—		CUB	Ricardo Polo Román (From TBD)
—		CUB	Yordan Castañer (From TBD)

=== Out ===
Note: Flags indicate national team as defined under FIFA eligibility rules; some limited exceptions apply. Players may hold more than one non-FIFA nationality.

No.	Pos.	Nation	Player
—		NCA	Axel Castillo (To TBD)
—		NCA	Kevin Gonzalez (To TBD)
—		NCA	Marlon Ukles (To TBD)
—		NCA	Rigoberto Fuentes (To TBD)
—		NCA	Darwin Corrales (To TBD)
—		NCA	Jasser Novoa (To TBD)

No.	Pos.	Nation	Player
—		NCA	Mario Ramirez (To TBD)
—	GK	NCA	Juan Martinez (To TBD)
—	GK	NCA	Denvron Fox (To Real Estelí FC)
—		NCA	Jeffryn Cornejo (To TBD)

== Coaching staff ==
As of January, 2026

Position	Staff
Manager	(Nicaragua) Sergio Ivan Rodriguez
Assistant manager	(Nicaragua) TBD
Physical coach	(Ecuador) Victor Meza
Goalkeeper coach	(Spain) José Vicente Peñarroja
Physiotherapist	(Nicaragua) TBD
Team doctor	(Nicaragua) TBD
Under 20 coach	(Nicaragua) TBD

-->

== List of coaches ==
- (Nicaragua) Óscar Castillo (– 2022)
- (Costa Rica) Glen Blanco (March – December 2022)
- (Honduras) Héctor Medina (December 2022 – June 2023)
- (Nicaragua) Sergio Ivan Rodriguez (July 2023 – present)
