= Josué Mitchell =

Costa Rican footballer (born 1989)

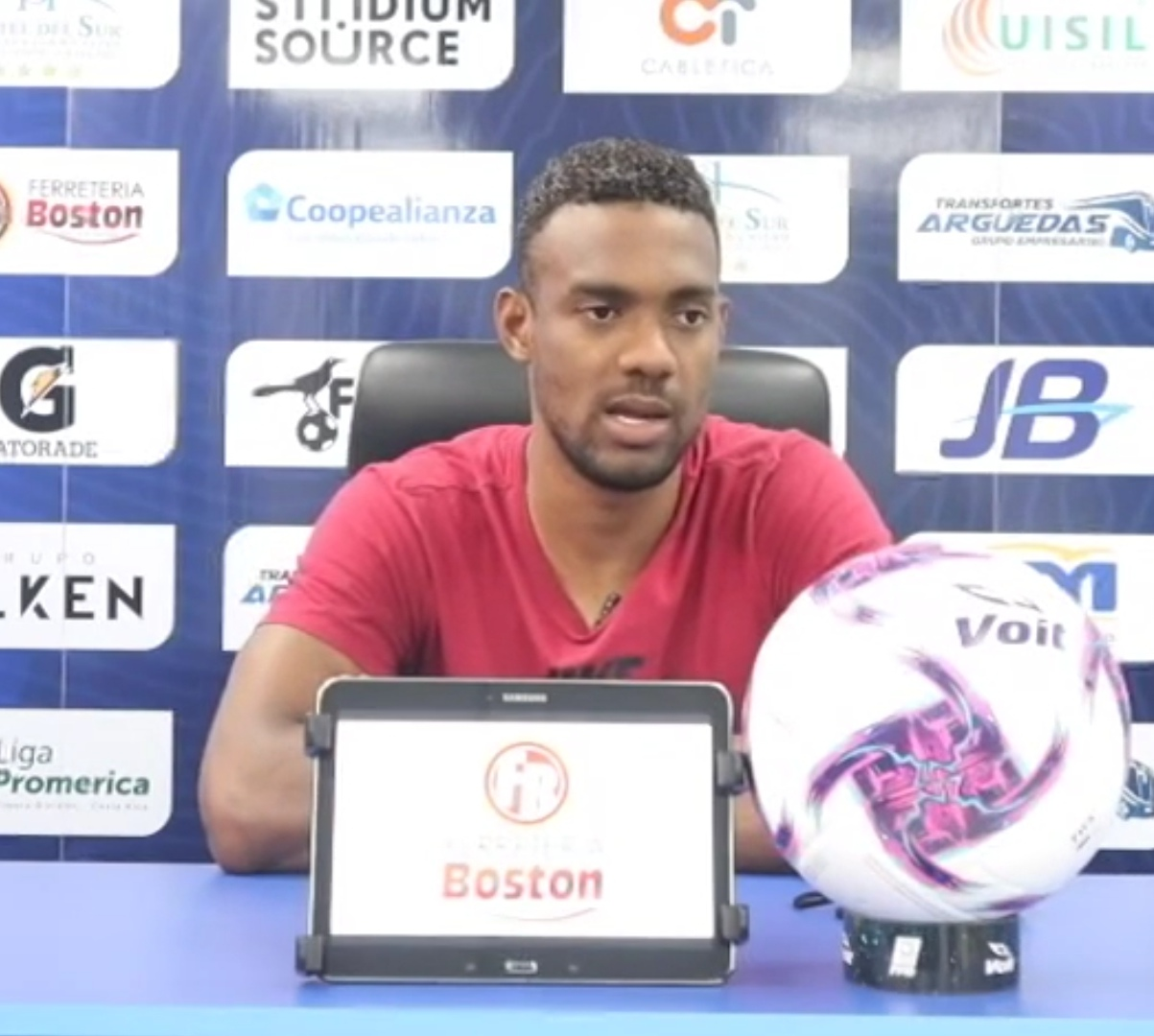

Personal information
- Full name: Josué Mitchell Omier
- Date of birth: 11 November 1989 (age 36)
- Place of birth: Limón, Costa Rica
- Height: 1.86 m (6 ft 1 in)
- Position: Forward

Team information
- Current team: Real Estelí FC
- Number: 12

Youth career
- Brujas

Senior career*
Years	Team	Apps	(Gls)
-2009	Brujas		
2010–2011	Barrio Mexico	15	(4)
2011	Santos Guapiles	13	(1)
2012–2013	Cartagines	21	(3)
2013	Limon	5	(3)
2013	Deportivo Iztapa		
2014	Juventud Escazuceña		
2014–2015	Pérez Zeledón	48	(9)
2016	Belén	7	(1)
2016	Santos Guapiles	14	(1)
2017	La U Universitarios	19	(3)
2017–2019	Pérez Zeledón	67	(20)
2019–2020	Coban Imperial	30	(10)
2020–2021	Pérez Zeledón	23	(0)
2021	Municipal Liberia		
2022	Sololá FC	7	(0)
2022	Plataneros FC		
2023	Quepos Cambute		
2024–2025	Pérez Zeledón	47	(5)
2025-	Estelí	4	(3)

International career
2018	Costa Rica	1	(0)
- * Club domestic league appearances and goals as of 13:37, 28 December 2025 (UTC)

Josué Mitchell (born 11 November 1989) is a Costa Rican professional football forward who plays for Real Estelí FC.

== Career ==
Mitchell played in Guatemala with Coban Imperial and moved back to the country to Sololá in 2022. Between those spells he had returned to Costa Rica to play again for Pérez Zeledón.

== International career ==
Mitchell was called up by coach Oscar Ramirez for friendly matches in March 2018 against Scotland and Tunisia in preparation for the 2018 FIFA World Cup. He made his debut for the Costa Rica national football team on 27 March 2018 in the friendly match against Tunisia at the Allianz Riviera Stadium in Nice, France. He entered as a substitute in the final quarter of the game.

== Personal life ==
Mitchell is the cousin of Alajuelense defender Jeyland Mitchell.
