= Matagalpa FC =

Nicaraguan football club

- Full name: Matagalpa Fútbol Club
- Nickname: Matagalpin
- Ground: Estadio Carlos Fonseca; Matagalpa, Nicaragua
- Capacity: 2,200
- Chairman: Víctor Tseng Pao
Home colours

Matagalpa Fútbol Club is a Nicaraguan football team playing in the second division of the Nicaragua football system. It is based in Matagalpa.

== Honours ==
- Segunda División de Nicaragua and predecessors
  - Champions (1): 2022 Clausura

== Current squad ==
As of: 19 January 2025 Note: Flags indicate national team as defined under FIFA eligibility rules; some limited exceptions apply. Players may hold more than one non-FIFA nationality.

No.	Pos.	Nation	Player
1	GK	NCA	Jeremy Espinoza
2		ARG	Franco Rondina
5		NCA	Ariel Velasquez
6		NCA	Leonardo Tercero
7		NCA	Stward Castillo
8		NCA	Raul Davila
9		NCA	Jorge Garcia
10		BRA	Robinson da Silva (captain)
12		COL	Jerson Lora
13		NCA	Jording Centeno
14		NCA	Waldner Vasquez
15		NCA	Felipe Herrera
16		NCA	Brandon Ayerdis
17		NCA	Isaac Sequeira

No.	Pos.	Nation	Player
21		HON	Angel Velasquez
22		NCA	Alexander Zuniga
23		NCA	Diego Gutierrez
25		NCA	Pablo Hernandez
34		NCA	Andres Garcia
50		NCA	Jose Medrano
—		NCA	TBD

=== Out on loan ===
Note: Flags indicate national team as defined under FIFA eligibility rules; some limited exceptions apply. Players may hold more than one non-FIFA nationality.

No.	Pos.	Nation	Player
—		NCA	Waldner Vasquez (at Diriangen until December 2026)
—		ARG	Nazareno Gomez (at managua until December 2026)

=== In ===
Note: Flags indicate national team as defined under FIFA eligibility rules; some limited exceptions apply. Players may hold more than one non-FIFA nationality.

No.	Pos.	Nation	Player
—		BRA	Douglas Caé (From Vasco da Gama Acre)
—	GK	NCA	Denvorn Fox (From TBD)
—		NCA	Bryan Gonzales (From FC Rio Blanco)
—	DF	NCA	Rafael Almeida (From TBD)

No.	Pos.	Nation	Player
—		NCA	TBD (From TBD)
—		NCA	TBD (From TBD)
—		NCA	TBD (From TBD)
—		NCA	TBD (From TBD)

=== Out ===
Note: Flags indicate national team as defined under FIFA eligibility rules; some limited exceptions apply. Players may hold more than one non-FIFA nationality.

No.	Pos.	Nation	Player
—		ARG	Nazareno Gomez (To Managua)
—		HON	Ángel Velásquez (To TBD)
—		NCA	TBD (To TBD)

No.	Pos.	Nation	Player
—		NCA	TBD (To TBD)
—		NCA	TBD (To TBD)
—		NCA	TBD (To TBD)

== Coaching staff ==
As of May, 2026

Position	Staff
Manager	(Argentina) Roberto Armando Chanampe
Assistant Manager	(Nicaragua) TBD
Physical coach	(Nicaragua) TBD
Goalkeeper Coach	(Nicaragua) TBD
Physiotherapist	(Nicaragua) TBD
Team Doctor	(Nicaragua) TBD
Under 20 coach	(Nicaragua) Hiram Centeno

== List of coaches ==
- (Nicaragua) Douglas El Pibe Urbina (Dec 2013 – Mar 2014)
- (Nicaragua) Denis Carrero (March 2014–??)
- (Nicaragua) Oscar Castillo (??– August 2022)
- (Nicaragua) Sting Fabricio López (August 2022 – December 2022)
- (Costa Rica) Glen Blanco (January 2023 – September 2023)
- (Argentina) Roberto Armando Chanampe (September 2023 – December 2024)
- (Spain) Juan Cortes (January 2025 - February 2025)
- (Honduras) Héctor Medina (February 2025 - October 2025)
- (Argentina) Roberto Armando Chanampe (October 2025 - October 2026)
- (Nicaragua) Derling Arauz (October 2026 - Present)

== See also ==
- Segunda División de Nicaragua
