= Nicaraguan Football Federation =

Governing body of association football in Nicaragua

CONCACAF
- Founded: 3 November 1931; 94 years ago
- Headquarters: Managua
- FIFA affiliation: 1950
- CONCACAF affiliation: 1961
- President: Manuel Salvador Quintanilla Martinez
- Website: https://www.fenifut.org.ni

The Nicaraguan Football Federation (FENIFUT; Spanish: Federación Nicaragüense de Fútbol) is the official governing body of association football in Nicaragua.

FENIFUT comprises 19 departmental and 153 municipal federations. It oversees all national men's, women's, futsal and youth championships. It is additionally responsible for appointing the management of the men's, women's, and various youth national football teams.

== Association staff ==
Name	Position	Source
(Nicaragua) Manuel Quintanilla	President	
(Nicaragua) Marlon Gómez	Vice President	
(Nicaragua) José Bermúdez	General Secretary	
n/a	Treasurer	
(Nicaragua) Roger Rodriguez	Technical Director	
n/a	Team Coach (Men's)	
(Nicaragua) Jaime Ruiz	Team Coach (Women's)	
(Nicaragua) Moises Avalos	Media/Communications Manager	
n/a	Futsal Coordinator	
(Nicaragua) Donald Campos	Referee Coordinator	
