= List of football clubs in Nicaragua =

This is a list of football (soccer) clubs in Nicaragua categorised by region and the divisions they play in

== Primera División ==
- Art Jalapa
- CD Walter Ferretti
- San Marcos FC
- Diriangén FC
- Club Sport Sébaco
- Managua F.C.
- Real Estelí
- Rancho Santana
- UNAN Managua

== Segunda División ==
- Lianziur Organica Masatepe
- San Francisco de Diriamba
- FC San Marcos
- Mina Limon FC
- FC Caritas Sports
- Nandasmo
- Bethel Matagalpa
- Brumas Jinotega
- Salem Tipitapa
- AC Chile Diria
- Real Xolotlan

== Nicaraguan Third Division ==
=== Grupo A ===
- Real Esteli Segunda
- FC Junior
- Juventus Santa Theresa
- Deportivo Masaya
- Real Muymuy
- Real Fraternidad

=== Grupo B ===
- FC Esteli
- Deportivo Jalapa
- ACS Niquinohomo
- Deportivo Fox Villa
- AC River
- Los Cedros

== Former clubs ==
- América Managua
- Bluefields
- Flor de Caña FC
- Masatepe
- Santa Cecilia
- Scorpión FC
- VCP Chinandega
- Xilotepelt
