= Campeonato Nacional de Segunda División =

Nicaragua association football league

- Country: Nicaragua
- Number of clubs: 28
- Level on pyramid: 3
- Promotion to: Liga Ascenso
- Relegation to: Cuarta División de Nicaragua

The Campeonato Nacional de Segunda División is the third division of Nicaraguan football. It is organized by the FENIFUT.

== History ==
Previously, the winners of this league were promoted directly to the Liga Primera. The 2020-2021 season was the last in which clubs were promoted to the first tier league. Beginning with the 2021-2022 season, a new second-tier league was created named the Liga Ascenso. In the process, the Campeonato Nacional de Segunda División became the third-tier of football in Nicaragua. The first season featured twenty-eight clubs from thirteen departments

== League format ==
The league is divided into two groups.

== Teams 2017 ==
Group A
| Team | Country | City |
| Niquinohomo FC | Niquinohomo | Masaya |
| Deportivo Catarina | Catarina | Masaya |
| FC Génesis | Rivas | Rivas |
| CSM Tipitapa | Tipitapa | Managua |
| Deportivo Masaya | Masaya | Masaya |
| Real Masaya FC | Masaya | Masaya |
| Kachuflines | Masaya | Masaya |
| Real Granada FC | Granada | Granada |
| Granada FC | Granada | Granada |
| El 26 | Managua | Managua |
Group B
| Team | Country | City |
| Mina FC | El Limón | León |
| Águilas de Leon | León | León |
| Chichigalpa FC | Chichigalpa | Chinandega |
| El Viejo FC | El Viejo | Chinandega |
| El Sauce FC | El Sauce | León |
| Real Altagracia | Managua | Managua |
| Salvador Dubois FC | Managua | Managua |
| América Managua | Managua | Managua |
| Pinoleros FC | Managua | Managua |
| San Jose FC | Managua | Managua |
Group C
| Team | County | City |
| FC Las Sabanas | Las Sabanas | Madriz |
| Wiwili NS | Wiwili | Nueva Segovia |
| FC Pantasma | Pantasma | Jinotega |
| Matagalpa FC | Matagalpa | Matagalpa |
| La Dalia FC | El Tuma - La Dalia | Matagalpa |
| Esquipulas FC | Esquipulas | Matagalpa |
| Wiwili FC | Wiwili | Jinotega |
| Deportivo Shick | Managua | Managua |
| Junior Managua | Managua | Managua |
| SC Inter | Pueblo Nuevo | Estelí |
Group D
| Team | Country | City |
| Metrostar | Estelí | Estelí |
| Chepeños FC | San José de los Remates | Boaco |
| Camoapa FC | Camoapa | Boaco |
| Deportivo Villa Sandino | Villa Sandino | Chontales |
| Atlético FC | Managua | Managua |
| Guerreros Managua | Managua | Managua |
| Los Cedros FC | Los Cedros | Managua |
| San Judas FC | Tipitapa | Managua |
| Uniag Rivas FC | Rivas | Rivas |
| FC Elander RSJ | San Carlos | Rio San Juan |

== See also ==
- Football in Nicaragua – overview of football sport
