= Miguel Rodríguez (footballer, born June 2003) =

Nicaraguan footballer (born 2003)

Personal information
- Full name: Miguel Antonio Rodríguez Agurcia
- Date of birth: 13 June 2003
- Place of birth: Ocotal, Nicaragua
- Height: 1.90 m (6 ft 3 in)
- Position: Goalkeeper

Team information
- Current team: SJK
- Number: 25

Senior career*
Years	Team	Apps	(Gls)
2021–2022	Ocotal	3	(0)
2022–2024	Diriangén	27	(0)
2023–2024	→ SJK (loan)	6	(0)
2023–2024	→ SJK II (loan)	14	(0)
2024–2025	SJK II	19	(0)
2025	SJK	2	(0)
2026–	Atlético Independiente	0	(0)

International career
2023–	Nicaragua	10	(0)
- * Club domestic league appearances and goals as of 19 November 2025

Miguel Antonio Rodríguez Agurcia (born 13 June 2003) is a Nicaraguan professional footballer who plays as a goalkeeper for Liga de Ascenso club Atlético Independiente and the Nicaragua national team.

== Early life ==
Rodríguez is a native of Ocotal, Nicaragua.

== Club career ==
Rodríguez was described as Nicaraguan side Diriangén's "starting goalkeeper and one of the goalkeepers with the most future in national soccer. His status as a national team gave him the opportunity to make a leap in quality".

In August 2023, Rodriguez was loaned out to Finnish side SJK and became the first Nicaraguan goalkeeper to play in Finland and the tenth Nicaraguan player to play in Europe. He was first registered to the club's academy team SJK II, playing in Finnish second tier. On 24 July 2024, SJK announced that they had signed with Rodríguez on a permanent contract until the end of 2026, with a two-year option.

== Style of play ==
Rodríguez has been described as "ability to read the game and react to dangerous situations has been highlighted".

== Career statistics ==
=== Club ===
As of 27 February 2025

Appearances and goals by club, season and competition
Club	Season	League			Cup (Note: Includes Suomen Cup)		Continental		Other		Total	
Club	Season	Division	Apps	Goals	Apps	Goals	Apps	Goals	Apps	Goals	Apps	Goals
Ocotal	2020–21	Liga Primera de Nicaragua	0	0	0	0	–		–		0	0
Ocotal	2021–22	Liga Primera de Nicaragua	3	0	0	0	–		–		3	0
Ocotal	Total		3	0	0	0	0	0	0	0	3	0
Diriangén	2022–23	Liga Primera de Nicaragua	27	0	0	0	1 (Note: Includes CONCACAF League)	0	–		28	0
SJK (loan)	2023	Veikkausliiga	4	0	0	0	–		0	0	4	0
SJK (loan)	2024	Veikkausliiga	2	0	0	0	–		0	0	2	0
SJK (loan)	Total		6	0	0	0	0	0	0	0	6	0
SJK Akatemia (loan)	2023	Ykkönen	7	0	–		–		–		7	0
SJK Akatemia (loan)	2024	Ykkösliiga	7	0	–		–		4 (Note: Includes Ykkösliigacup)	0	11	0
SJK Akatemia (loan)	Total		14	0	0	0	0	0	4	0	18	0
SJK Akatemia	2024	Ykkösliiga	11	0	–		–		–		11	0
SJK Akatemia	2025	Ykkösliiga	0	0	0	0	–		1	0	1	0
SJK Akatemia	Total		11	0	0	0	0	0	1	0	12	0
SJK	2025	Veikkausliiga	0	0	0	0	0	0	1 (Note: Appearances in Finnish League Cup)	0	1	0
Career total			58	0	0	0	1	0	4	0	63	0

=== International ===
As of match played 9 June 2024

Nicaragua
Year	Apps	Goals
2023	7	0
2024	3	0
Total	10	0
