= Boaco =

- Municipality
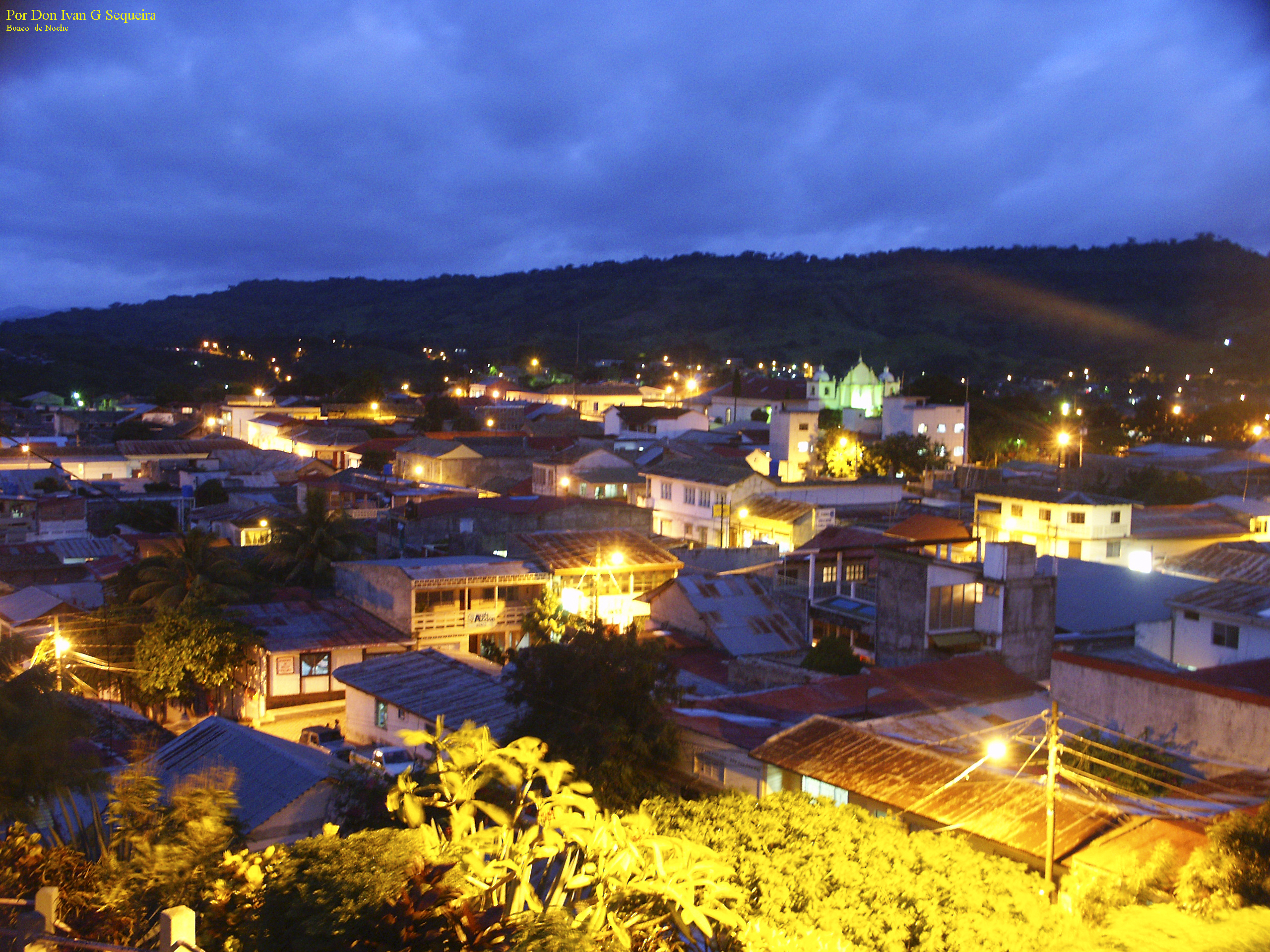
- View of Boaco at night

- Flag Seal

- Location in Nicaragua
- Coordinates: 12°28′N 85°40′W
- Country: Nicaragua
- Department: Boaco Department

Area
  - Municipality: 1,087 km^{2} (420 sq mi)

Population (2022 estimate)
  - Municipality: 63,422
  - Density: 58.35/km^{2} (151.1/sq mi)
  - Urban: 26,209

Boaco (Spanish pronunciation: [boˈa.ko]) is the capital city and a municipality of the Boaco Department of Nicaragua. The municipality of Boaco has a population of 63,422 (2022 est.) and an area of 1,087 km^{2} (26% of the Boaco Department) while the department (state) is 4,177 km2.

The city of Boaco, with a population of 26,209 (2022 estimate), is located in the mountains 88 km. east of Managua. Boaco is called "Ciudad de Dos Pisos" (The Two-Storey City), nicknamed by Dr. Armando Incer Barquero. The city's only two flat places are El Parque (Park) and the baseball field.

== History ==
The name Boaco has its roots in the Zumo and Aztec native languages. It is composed of two words; Boa or Boaj ("Enchanters") and the suffix O ("place" or "town"). In other words, Boaco means "Place (or Town) of the Enchanters". The ancient Boaco, or Boaco Viejo (Old Boaco) was located five leagues (15 miles) east of the present-day city of Boaco. No vestiges of the former population remain. It was founded by Spanish colonists who migrated from today's Guatemala.

In 1749, the Zambo, Caribe and Mosquito Indians, encouraged by the British colonists on Nicaragua's Atlantic coast, raided Boaco Viejo. They destroyed the town. The few who survived the massacre fled west and founded the new town of Boaco (now known as Boaquito ("little Boaco")) near the Malacatoya River. Between 1752 and 1772, the population of what was called Boaquito moved to higher ground, where the city of Boaco is today, mainly due to the endemic diseases and flooding that regularly occurred in the lowlands during the rainy season.

The municipality of Boaco was traditionally part of the Chontales Department. On February 4, 1910, the government of José Madriz established the department of Jerez with the city of Boaco as its capital. However, the conservative government reversed that law. It was not until July 18, 1935 that the government of Juan Bautista Sacasa created the Boaco Department, incorporating the municipalities of Boaco, Camoapa, San Lorenzo, Teustepe, San José de los Remates and Santa Lucía. Boaco was designated the capital of the department.

== Geography ==
Boaco is located in the hilly central region of Nicaragua. Its topography is irregular with many mountains, which are smaller than the mountains in northern Nicaragua. The highest peak is El Cerro de la Vieja (the old woman's hill) with an altitude of 1,020 m. The average elevation above sea level is 360 m.

The municipality of Boaco (12°28′N 85°40′W) borders with the municipality of Muy Muy to the north; the municipalities of San Lorenzo and Camoapa to the south; the municipality of Camoapa to the east; and the municipalities of San José de los Remates, Santa Lucia and Teustepe to the west.

=== Climate ===
Boaco has a diverse climate which ranges from that of a tropical forest to that of tropical grasslands with scattered trees. The average temperature is between 27 °C and 30 °C during summer and 18 °C in December. The annual precipitation is 1,200-2,000 mm.

== Politics and government ==
Elections for municipal authorities are held every four years. The current mayor of the municipality of Boaco is Vivian Orozco Zamora from the Sandinista National Liberation Front (FSLN).

Following the 2004 municipal elections, the seats are divided in the following way:

The governing party: Sandinista National Liberation Front: 5

Parties in opposition: Constitutionalist Liberal Party: 5

== Economy ==
Boaco is the economic hub of the agricultural and cattle-ranching lands in region. The city has played an important part in Nicaragua's economy, providing pecuarian products (beef, dairy products) to the rest of the country, as well as exporting to other countries.

With the help of new paved roads, business from the country's capital of Managua has reached Boaco and stimulated the local economy. Boaco now has casinos, banks, gas stations and its first traffic lights installed.

The labour force is about 40% of the population of Boaco, about 23,000, with an unemployment rate of 13%.

== Education ==
According to the 2000 census on education, Boaco has a population of about 31,000 students and 350 teachers (excluding community pre-school workers).

Elementary education (urban area only):

- Students: 10,000
- Facilities: 22

Secondary education (urban area only):

- Students: 15,000
- Facilities: 15

Multi-grade education (rural area only):

- Students: 10,000
- Facilities: 308

Community Pre-Schools:

- Urban area: 2,000 (74 facilities)
- Rural area: 3,000 (308 facilities)

== Demographics ==
The municipality of Boaco is home to around 1% of Nicaragua's total population. It plays a more important role in the country's economy as a major producer of beef and dairy produces in what is called the cattle cluster (which includes the Chontales region).

Of the population of 56,900 (2006 est.), 27,900 (49%) are men and 29,000 (51%) women. The average age is 21.4 years; 60.5% of the population is between 15 and 64 years of age.

The rural population represents 61% of the total and the urban population 39%. The population density is 52.36 inhabitants/km^{2}.

== Culture ==
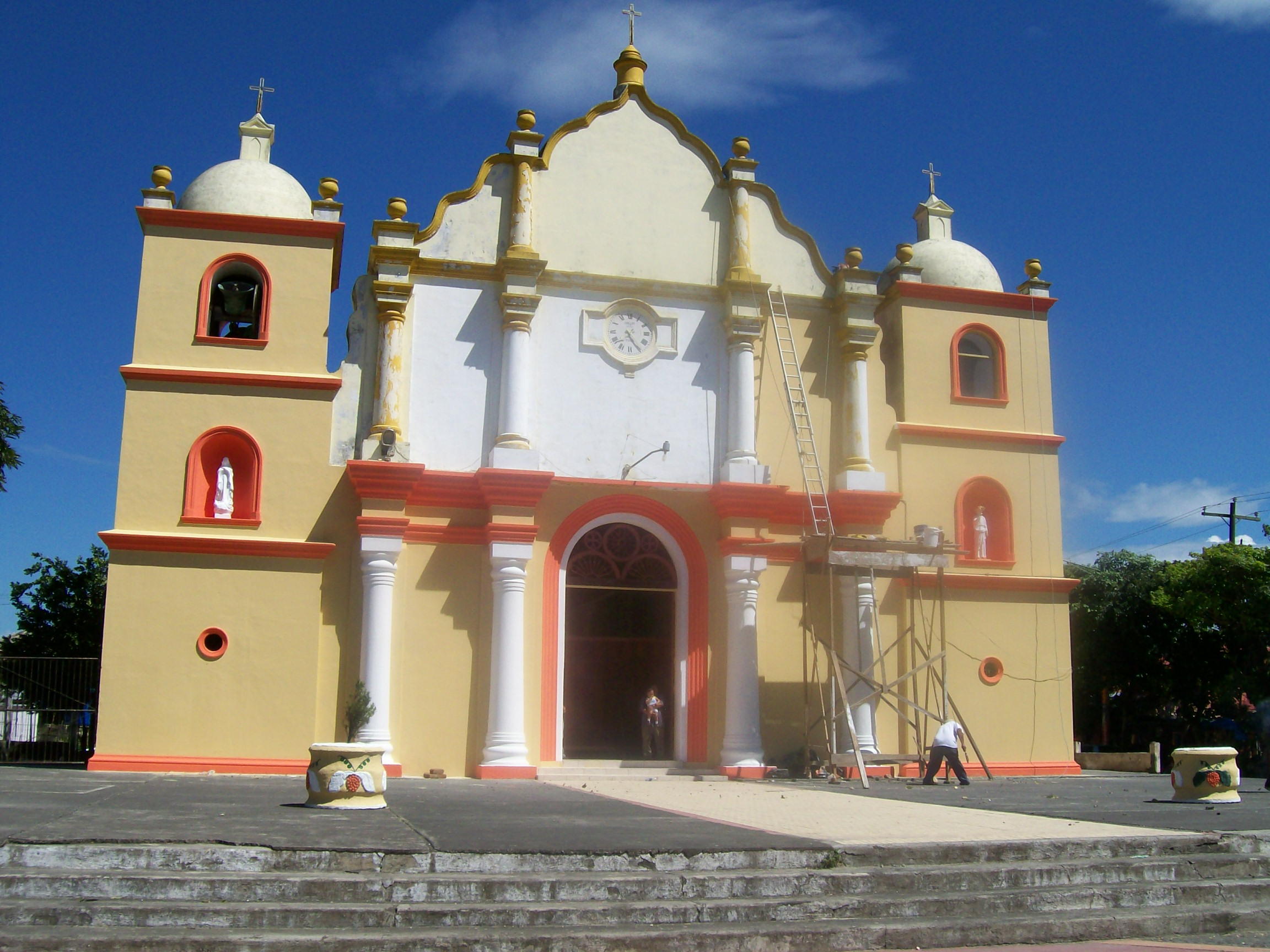
Church in Boaco

Boaco has a public library, Fernando Buitrago Morales, founded after the Sandinista Revolution in July 1979 by Flavio César Tijerino and a group of young students, including Ricardo Sequeira his daughters, Melba Tijerino, Velleda Tijerino, Humberto Rivas, and Marlene Sotelo. The library had an initial collection of 500 books. Later that year, the library became part of the newly founded Network of Public Libraries, which was organized and coordinated by the Culture Department. With national and international support from governments, organisations and individuals, today the public library of Boaco has a collection of more than 8,000 books.

Boaco has several museums: The Boaco Museum of Anthropology, Arturo Javier Suarez Miranda's The Municipal Museum, and a private museum owned by Armando Incer Barquero.

=== Literature and arts ===
Hernan Robleto (novelist), and Fernando Buitrago Morales (poet, novelist, and historian) were the first figures in Boaco's literature. Boaco was the native town of several poets and artists such as Armando Incer Barquero, Dr. Moises Sotelo Castillo, Luis Rocha, Flavio Cesar Tijerino (poet and writer) and others in the intellectual Grupo U from 1958. In recent years Lázaro Díaz, Javier León Valdez and others have made up the Grupo Macuta. Among its most famous artists: painter Armando Morales Sequeira, who currently resides in Paris, France Mariadilia Martinez Caracas and primitivist painter and artist Julito Sequeira.

=== Local festivities ===
The local festivities in honor of the city's patron saint, Apóstol Santiago (Apostle Saint James) begin on July 25. The most traditional and folkloric aspect of this celebration are Los Bailantes (The Dancers), a group of peasants who have performed each year, from generation to generation since the 17th century, to honor the patron of Boaco.

== Transport and communications ==
Both paved and unpaved roads connect Boaco to other important cities in the country. Public transportation (bus) is available to Managua and other locations inside and outside the department.

=== Communications ===
Telecommunications in Boaco are supervised by the Nicaraguan Telecommunications Company (Empresa Nicaragüense de Telecomunicaciones - ENITEL), which serves 1,326 individuals in the municipality of Boaco.

Mobile telephones are frequently used by the population. Movistar and Claro are the two telephone companies providing mobile telephone services in the area.

=== Media ===
BoacoVisión is the local cable TV channel. There are several local radio stations broadcasting on FM.

== See also ==
- Boaco, Chontales and the road to El Rama
- Boaco in Nicaragua Living
- Boaco in Vianica

== Sources ==
- AMUNIC
- MAG-FOR
- Manfut
- The World Factbook
- flaviotijerino.org
