= 2020 CONCACAF U-20 Championship qualifying =

2020 CONCACAF U-20 Championship qualifying stage
Tournament details
- Host countries: Nicaragua (Group A); Dominican Republic (Group B); Curaçao (Group C); Puerto Rico (Group D)
- Dates: 15–23 February 2020
- Teams: 17 (from 1 confederation)

Tournament statistics
- Matches played: 28
- Goals scored: 113 (4.04 per match)
- Top scorer(s): (Nicaragua) Edry Centeno (5 goals)

The 2020 CONCACAF U-20 Championship qualifying stage took place between 15 and 23 February 2020. The teams competed for four of the 20 berths in the 2020 CONCACAF U-20 Championship final tournament.

== Teams ==
The qualifying format changed from the 2016 edition (no qualifying was held for the 2018 edition), and the teams were no longer divided into regional zones.

The 41 CONCACAF teams were ranked based on the CONCACAF Men's Under-20 Ranking as of June 2019. A total of 33 teams entered the tournament. The highest-ranked 16 entrants were exempt from qualifying and advanced directly to the group stage of the final tournament, while the lowest-ranked 17 entrants had to participate in qualifying, where the four group winners advanced to the round of 16 of the knockout stage of the final tournament.

Exempt from qualifying (16 teams)
Rank	Team	Points
1	United States	7,092
2	Mexico	6,167
3	Panama	5,065
4	Honduras	4,794
5	Costa Rica	3,466
6	El Salvador	3,395
7	Cuba	2,644
8	Haiti	2,455
9	Canada	2,404
10	Trinidad and Tobago	2,395
11	Guatemala	2,187
12	Jamaica	2,089
13	Antigua and Barbuda	1,535
14	Suriname	1,327
15	Saint Kitts and Nevis	1,325
16	Aruba	1,248

Participating in qualifying stage (17 teams)
Rank	Team	Points
17	Dominican Republic	1,232
18	Bermuda	1,214
19	Curaçao	1,194
20	Nicaragua	1,193
21	Puerto Rico	1,150
22	Guadeloupe (Note: Non-FIFA members and thus ineligible to play in World Cup.)	1,050
24	Grenada	856
25	Guyana	773
26	Dominica	772
27	Cayman Islands	730
28	Saint Vincent and the Grenadines	723
30	Belize	655
31	Barbados	528
32	Saint Martin	500
33	U.S. Virgin Islands	499
36	Anguilla	55
41	Montserrat	0

Did not enter tournament (8 teams)
Rank	Team	Points
23	Saint Lucia	871
29	Martinique	681
34	Sint Maarten	466
35	Turks and Caicos Islands	67
37	Bahamas	0
38	Bonaire	0
39	British Virgin Islands	0
40	French Guiana	0

== Draw ==
The draw for the qualifying round took place on 20 November 2019, 11:00 EST (UTC−5), at the CONCACAF Headquarters in Miami. The 17 teams which entered the qualifying stage were drawn into four groups: one group of five teams and three groups of four teams.

Pot 1	Pot 2	Pot 3	Pot 4
Dominican Republic; Bermuda; Curaçao; Nicaragua	Puerto Rico; Guadeloupe; Grenada; Guyana	Dominica; Cayman Islands; Saint Vincent and the Grenadines; Belize	Barbados; Saint Martin; U.S. Virgin Islands; Anguilla; Montserrat

== Qualifying stage ==
The winners of each group qualify for the 2020 CONCACAF U-20 Championship, where they enter the round of 16 of the knockout stage.

=== Group A ===
All times are local, UTC−6.

Pos	Team	Pld	W	D	L	GF	GA	GD	Pts	Qualification
1	Nicaragua (H)	4	4	0	0	15	0	+15	12	2020 CONCACAF U-20 Championship
2	Guyana	4	3	0	1	11	1	+10	9	
3	U.S. Virgin Islands	4	1	1	2	4	13	−9	4	
4	Saint Vincent and the Grenadines	4	1	0	3	7	9	−2	3	
5	Montserrat	4	0	1	3	2	16	−14	1	

Source: CONCACAF
(H) Hosts
15 February 2020
16:30

Guyana	6–0	Montserrat
Glasgow 31'; George 36'; McArthur 49', 78', 84'; Bayley 87'	Report

Nicaragua National Football Stadium, Managua
Referee: Bryan Lopez Castellanos (Guatemala)
15 February 2020
19:30

Nicaragua	8–0	U.S. Virgin Islands
Ugalde 10', 17'; Centeno 54', 64', 72'; Castillo 68', 90+2'; Cano 80'	Report

Nicaragua National Football Stadium, Managua
Referee: Okeito Nicholson (Jamaica)

17 February 2020
16:30

Saint Vincent and the Grenadines	0–3	Guyana
	Report	Simpson 36', 48'; Glasgow 69'

Nicaragua National Football Stadium, Managua
Referee: Randy Encarnacion (Dominican Republic)
17 February 2020
19:30

Nicaragua	4–0	Montserrat
Medina 5', 32'; Centeno 19', 53'	Report

Nicaragua National Football Stadium, Managua
Referee: Selvin Antonio Brown Chavarria (Honduras)

19 February 2020
16:30

U.S. Virgin Islands	1–1	Montserrat
Williams 45+1'	Report	Duberry 54'

Nicaragua National Football Stadium, Managua
Referee: Okeito Nicholson (Jamaica)
19 February 2020
19:30

Saint Vincent and the Grenadines	0–2	Nicaragua
	Report	Medina 34' (pen.); Castillo 88'

Nicaragua National Football Stadium, Managua
Referee: Oliver Vergara (Panama)

21 February 2020
16:30

Montserrat	1–5	Saint Vincent and the Grenadines
Duberry 40'	Report	Daley 4' (o.g.), 55' (o.g.); Medica 12'; Quashie 48'; Pompey 67'

Nicaragua National Football Stadium, Managua
Referee: Bryan Lopez Castellanos (Guatemala)
21 February 2020
19:30

U.S. Virgin Islands	0–2	Guyana
	Report	Glasgow 55'; McArthur 58' (pen.)

Nicaragua National Football Stadium, Managua
Referee: Selvin Antonio Brown Chavarria (Honduras)

23 February 2020
16:30

Saint Vincent and the Grenadines	2–3	U.S. Virgin Islands
Williams 9' (pen.); Dopwell 55'	Report	Francis 41'; St. Louis 75'; Williams 85' (o.g.)

Nicaragua National Football Stadium, Managua
Referee: Randy Encarnacion (Dominican Republic)
23 February 2020
19:30

Nicaragua	1–0	Guyana
Ugalde 55'	Report

Nicaragua National Football Stadium, Managua
Referee: Oliver Vergara (Panama)

=== Group B ===
All times are local, UTC−4.

Pos	Team	Pld	W	D	L	GF	GA	GD	Pts	Qualification
1	Dominican Republic (H)	3	3	0	0	9	0	+9	9	2020 CONCACAF U-20 Championship
2	Grenada	3	2	0	1	10	2	+8	6	
3	Dominica	3	1	0	2	5	6	−1	3	
4	Anguilla	3	0	0	3	1	17	−16	0	

Source: CONCACAF
(H) Hosts
19 February 2020
14:00

Grenada	3–1	Dominica
Clyne 14'; Maitland 43'; Richardson 88'	Report	Lockhart 40'

Complejo deportivo de Bayaguana, Monte Plata
Referee: Luis Enrique Santander (Mexico)
19 February 2020
16:00

Dominican Republic	6–0	Anguilla
Rodríguez 21', 36'; Rosas 30', 45+3' (pen.); Valdéz 65'; Sánchez 80'	Report

Complejo deportivo de Bayaguana, Monte Plata
Referee: José Torres Rivera (Puerto Rico)

21 February 2020
14:00

Anguilla	0–7	Grenada
	Report	Ettienne 40', 59'; Clyne 42'; James 52'; Gibbs 65'; Maitland 81' (pen.); Charles 84'

Complejo deportivo de Bayaguana, Monte Plata
Referee: Sergio Reyna Möller (Guatemala)
21 February 2020
16:00

Dominica	0–2	Dominican Republic
	Report	Báez 52', 90'

Complejo deportivo de Bayaguana, Monte Plata
Referee: Edgar Alonso Ramírez (El Salvador)

23 February 2020
14:00

Dominica	4–1	Anguilla
Laville 2', 79'; Paul 12', 72'	Report	Bradshaw 29'

Complejo deportivo de Bayaguana, Monte Plata
Referee: José Torres Rivera (Puerto Rico)
23 February 2020
16:00

Dominican Republic	1–0	Grenada
Made 83'	Report

Complejo deportivo de Bayaguana, Monte Plata
Referee: Luis Enrique Santander (Mexico)

=== Group C ===
All times are local, UTC−4.

Pos	Team	Pld	W	D	L	GF	GA	GD	Pts	Qualification
1	Guadeloupe	3	3	0	0	11	1	+10	9	2020 CONCACAF U-20 Championship
2	Curaçao (H)	3	2	0	1	7	2	+5	6	
3	Belize	3	1	0	2	5	8	−3	3	
4	Saint Martin	3	0	0	3	1	13	−12	0	

Source: CONCACAF
(H) Hosts
18 February 2020
16:30

Guadeloupe	6–0	Belize
Bourgeois 19'; Janky 34'; Lorquin 39'; Casimir 42'; Kissy 58'; Lunion 79'	Report

Ergilio Hato Stadium, Willemstad
Referee: Jose Antonio Kellys Marquez (Panama)
18 February 2020
19:30

Curaçao	5–0	Saint Martin
Zimmerman 3', 5', 9'; Noslin 14'; Caciano 90+3'	Report

Ergilio Hato Stadium, Willemstad
Referee: Pierre-Luc Lauziere (Canada)

20 February 2020
16:30

Saint Martin	1–4	Guadeloupe
Edwards 41'	Report	Casimir 29', 45'; Janky 86'; Pezeron 90'

Ergilio Hato Stadium, Willemstad
Referee: Sherwin Johnson (Guyana)
20 February 2020
19:30

Belize	1–2	Curaçao
August 55'	Report	Vrutaal 37', 86'

Ergilio Hato Stadium, Willemstad
Referee: Ricangel de Leça (Aruba)

22 February 2020
16:30

Belize	4–0	Saint Martin
Galvez 22'; Zelaya 69'; August 77'; Pou 90+1'	Report

Ergilio Hato Stadium, Willemstad
Referee: Jose Antonio Kellys Marquez (Panama)
22 February 2020
19:30

Curaçao	0–1	Guadeloupe
	Report	Montantin 59'

Ergilio Hato Stadium, Willemstad
Referee: Pierre-Luc Lauziere (Canada)

=== Group D ===
All times are local, UTC−4.

Pos	Team	Pld	W	D	L	GF	GA	GD	Pts	Qualification
1	Barbados	3	3	0	0	10	2	+8	9	2020 CONCACAF U-20 Championship
2	Puerto Rico (H)	3	1	1	1	6	8	−2	4	
3	Cayman Islands	3	1	0	2	4	8	−4	3	
4	Bermuda	3	0	1	2	5	7	−2	1	

Source: CONCACAF
(H) Hosts
19 February 2020
16:30

Bermuda	2–3	Barbados
Swan 23', 73'	Report	Griffith 34'; Gale 69', 87'

Juan Ramón Loubriel Stadium, Bayamón
Referee: Hector Rodriguez Hernandez (Honduras)
19 February 2020
19:30

Puerto Rico	4–2	Cayman Islands
Díaz 30', 90+3'; Rabell 70'; Mateo 88'	Report	Smith 67', 90+4'

Juan Ramón Loubriel Stadium, Bayamón
Referee: Nima Saghafi (United States)

21 February 2020
16:30

Cayman Islands	2–1	Bermuda
Conolly 53'; Rowe 90+3'	Report	Swan 45'

Juan Ramón Loubriel Stadium, Bayamón
Referee: Oshane Nation (Jamaica)
21 February 2020
19:30

Barbados	4–0	Puerto Rico
Gale 6'; Belle 11'; Griffith 32'; Reid-Stephen 69'	Report

Juan Ramón Loubriel Stadium, Bayamón
Referee: Tristley Bassue (Saint Kitts and Nevis)

23 February 2020
16:30

Barbados	3–0	Cayman Islands
Reid-Stephen 51'; Greenidge 85', 86'	Report

Juan Ramón Loubriel Stadium, Bayamón
Referee: Tristley Bassue (Saint Kitts and Nevis)
23 February 2020
19:30

Puerto Rico	2–2	Bermuda
Mateo 4', 29'	Report	Swan 43' (pen.); Dill 67'

Juan Ramón Loubriel Stadium, Bayamón
Referee: Nima Saghafi (United States)

== Goalscorers ==
There were 113 goals scored in 28 matches, for an average of 4.04 goals per match.

5 goals

- (Nicaragua) Edry Centeno

4 goals

- (Bermuda) Luciano Swan
- (Guyana) Nicholas McArthur

3 goals

- (Barbados) Thierry Gale
- (Curaçao) Joshua Zimmerman
- (Guadeloupe) Josué Casimir
- (Guyana) Omari Glasgow
- (Nicaragua) Edgard Castillo
- (Nicaragua) Harold Medina
- (Nicaragua) Ezequiel Ugalde
- (Puerto Rico) Jan Mateo

2 goals

- (Barbados) Donte Greenidge
- (Barbados) Nigel Griffith
- (Barbados) Niall Reid-Stephen
- (Belize) Jesse August
- (Cayman Islands) Corey Smith
- (Curaçao) Luchenthly Vrutaal
- (Dominica) Audel Laville
- (Dominica) Kadimel Paul
- (Dominican Republic) Josué Báez
- (Dominican Republic) Franklin Rodríguez
- (Dominican Republic) Jesús Rosas
- (Guadeloupe) Willcyd Janky
- (Grenada) Chiesa Clyne
- (Grenada) Benjamin Ettienne
- (Grenada) Kevon Maitland
- (Guyana) Osafa Simpson
- (Montserrat) Lewis Duberry
- (Puerto Rico) Alec Díaz

1 goal

- (Anguilla) Sedu Bradshaw
- (Barbados) Tyrique Belle
- (Bermuda) Ayleal Dill
- (Belize) Wilfredo Galvez
- (Belize) Ian Pou
- (Belize) Alwin Zelaya
- (Cayman Islands) Cyrus Conolly
- (Cayman Islands) D'Andre Rowe
- (Curaçao) Lentini Caciano
- (Curaçao) Tyrese Noslin
- (Dominica) Coann Lockhart
- (Dominican Republic) Jayson Made
- (Dominican Republic) Joel Sánchez
- (Dominican Republic) Dennis Valdéz
- (Grenada) Brady Charles
- (Grenada) Jayden Gibbs
- (Grenada) Christian James
- (Grenada) Rondel Richardson
- (Guadeloupe) Dustin Bourgeois
- (Guadeloupe) Aymerik Kissy
- (Guadeloupe) Menael Lorquin
- (Guadeloupe) Loann Lunion
- (Guadeloupe) Kenjy Montantin
- (Guadeloupe) William Pezeron
- (Guyana) Ravon Bayley
- (Guyana) Dorwin George
- (Nicaragua) Justing Cano
- (Puerto Rico) Alejandro Rabell
- (Collectivity of Saint Martin) Nailon Edwards
- (Saint Vincent and the Grenadines) Jerron Dopwell
- (Saint Vincent and the Grenadines) Alpheus Medica
- (Saint Vincent and the Grenadines) Joel Quashie
- (Saint Vincent and the Grenadines) Jahiem Pompey
- (Saint Vincent and the Grenadines) Mekeal Williams
- (United States Virgin Islands) Shomari Francis
- (United States Virgin Islands) Jimson St. Louis
- (United States Virgin Islands) Arthbert Williams

1 own goal

- (Saint Vincent and the Grenadines) Mekeal Williams (against the U.S. Virgin Islands)

2 own goals

- (Montserrat) Ahijah Daley (against Saint Vincent and the Grenadines)
