= Harold Medina (footballer) =

Nicaraguan footballer (born 2002)

Personal information
- Full name: Harold Joshua Medina
- Date of birth: 30 January 2002 (age 24)
- Place of birth: Bluefields, Nicaragua
- Height: 1.73 m (5 ft 8 in)
- Position: Midfielder

Team information
- Current team: Real Estelí
- Number: 10

Youth career
- Real Estelí

Senior career*
Years	Team	Apps	(Gls)
2019–	Real Estelí	167	(37)

International career^{‡}
2019	Nicaragua U17	1	(0)
2020	Nicaragua U20	3	(3)
2020–	Nicaragua	27	(3)
- * Club domestic league appearances and goals as of 6 April 2025 ‡ National team caps and goals as of 15 October 2024

Harold Joshua Medina (Spanish pronunciation: [aɾˈold xˈoswa meðˈina]; born 30 January 2002) is a Nicaraguan professional footballer who plays as a midfielder for Liga Primera club Real Estelí and the Nicaragua national team.

Developed in the youth academy of Real Estelí, Medina made his official debut for the senior club in 2019. He has since made over 100 appearances and scored over 30 goals. Medina has also won four league titles, and has been regarded as a key player for the club.

== Club career ==
=== Real Estelí ===
A youth academy graduate of Real Estelí, Medina made his league debut on 22 August 2019 in a 3–0 win against Deportivo Las Sabanas.

== International career ==
=== Youth ===
Medina has represented Nicaragua at the 2019 CONCACAF U-17 Championship and the 2020 CONCACAF U-20 Championship qualifiers.

=== Senior ===
In October 2020, Medina received his first call-up to the senior team. He made his debut on 11 October 2020 in a 1–1 draw against Honduras.

== Career statistics ==
=== Club ===
As of 14 March 2021

Club	Season	League			Continental		Other		Total	
Club	Season	Division	Apps	Goals	Apps	Goals	Apps	Goals	Apps	Goals
Real Estelí	2019–20	Liga Primera de Nicaragua	15	0	—		7 (Note: Four matches in Clausura playoffs and three matches in Apertura playoffs.)	0	22	0
Real Estelí	2020–21	Liga Primera de Nicaragua	15	1	0	0	1 (Note: One match in Apertura playoffs.)	0	16	1
Career total			30	1	0	0	8	0	38	1

=== International ===
As of match played 15 October 2024

Appearances and goals by national team and year
National team	Year	Apps	Goals
Nicaragua	2020	1	0
Nicaragua	2021	0	0
Nicaragua	2022	8	0
Nicaragua	2023	9	1
Nicaragua	2024	9	2
Total		27	3

Scores and results list Nicaragua's goal tally first, score column indicates score after each Medina goal.

List of international goals scored by Harold Medina
No.	Date	Venue	Opponent	Score	Result	Competition
1	13 October 2023	Wildey Turf, Wildey, Barbados	Montserrat	2–0	3–0	2023–24 CONCACAF Nations League B
2	26 May 2024	PayPal Park, San Jose, United States	Guatemala	1–1	1–1	Friendly
3	5 June 2024	Nicaragua National Football Stadium, Managua, Nicaragua	Montserrat	4–1	4–1	2026 FIFA World Cup qualification

== Honours ==
Real Estelí

- Liga Primera: 2019 Apertura, 2020 Clausura, 2020 Apertura, 2022 Apertura
