= Pedro Jirón =

Nicaraguan footballer

Personal information
- Full name: Pedro José Jirón Rugama
- Date of birth: 18 December 1939
- Place of birth: Diriamba, Nicaragua
- Date of death: 7 September 2018 (aged 78)
- Place of death: Diriamba, Nicaragua
- Position: Midfielder

Youth career
- Diriangén

Senior career*
Years	Team	Apps	(Gls)
1958–1973	Diriangén		

International career
- Nicaragua
- * Club domestic league appearances and goals

Pedro Jose Jirón Rugama "Peche Jirón" (18 December 1939 – 7 September 2018) was a Nicaraguan professional footballer who played as a midfielder.

== Club career ==
Pedro played in the First Division with Diriangén for 15 years and was their captain for eight years. He won 3 league titles with Diriangén and aiding the great Manuel Cuadra to many goals.

== International career ==
Pedro captained the Nicaragua national football team for 6 years and played 5 matches for them as they came sixth in the 1967 CONCACAF Championship.

== Style of play ==
Pedro was a versatile midfielder known for his discipline, tactical awareness, and physical endurance. He has been described as one of Nicaragua's leading midfield players.

== Life after career ==
On 9 February 1995, Pedro was inducted into the Nicaraguan Sports Hall of Fame.

== Honours ==
Diriangén

- Primera División de Nicaragua: 1959, 1969, 1970
