= Teustepe =

- Municipality
- Location in Nicaragua
- Coordinates: 12°25′N 85°48′W
- Country: Nicaragua
- Department: Boaco Department

Area
  - Municipality: 249.32 sq mi (645.73 km^{2})

Population (2005)
  - Municipality: 26,265
  - Density: 105.35/sq mi (40.675/km^{2})
  - Urban: 3,953

Teustepe is a municipality in the Boaco department of Nicaragua. It has a population of 26,800 (2006, est.) and an extension of 645.73 km^{2}. The capital is the town of Teustepe, 94 km. from Managua with a population of 3,500 (2006, est.).

Teustepe is sustained mainly by the agricultural sector, with about 20,000 units of livestock and secondly by agricultural activities. There are also some incipient tourism in the Aguas Termales (termal waters) region and a very small scale family-based industry (handicrafts mainly) in the urban and rural areas.

The current mayor of the municipality of Teustepe is Paulina Ramos from the FSLN

The current vice-mayor of the municipality of Teustepe is Willfredo Díaz from the FSLN

== History ==
The name Teustepe have its origin in the Chorotega native language. Teote (God) and Tepec (Place or Town), that means Town, Valley or Place of God. The indigenous population established originally in El Tamarindo, NW of the town's actual position. Due to the constant flood of the Malacatoya River, the population moved between September and December 1776 to a place formerly known as Camoapilla, now the town of Teustepe. Teustepe is of historical importance for its resistance during the war against filibuster William Walker. The Military District of Teustepe was created by the initiative of General Tomás Martínez in April 1861. It had under its jurisdiction the towns of Boaco, San Lorenzo y San José de los Remates.

On 28 February 1970, Teustepe was declared city by law.

== Local festivities ==
The festivities in honor of Santa Rita de Casia are held between May 18–23. Another important event is in honor of the Virgin of Candelaria on February 2.
