= Real Granada FC =

- Nicknames: Tiburones Azules (Blue Sharks)
- Founded: 2015
- Ground: Estadio INTECNA
- Capacity: 2,000
- League: Campeonato Nacional de Segunda División

Real Granada FC is a Nicaraguan football club based in Granada. The club competes in the Campeonato Nacional de Segunda División, the third tier of football in Nicaragua.

== Stadium ==
The team plays its home matches at the Estadio Olímpico del Instituto Tecnológico Nacional (Estadio INTECNA).

== History ==
For the 2019/2020 season, Real Granada FC played in the Tercera Division de Nicaragua, Nicaragua's third-tier league. That season, the club won the league championship. With the championship, Real Granada earned promotion to the Campeonato Nacional de Segunda División for the 2020/2021 season. At the time, the Segunda División was the second-tier league in the country.
