= Santa Lucía, Nicaragua =

Santa Lucía
- Municipality
- Location in Nicaragua
- Coordinates: 12°31′N 85°23′W
- Country: Nicaragua
- Department: Boaco Department

Area
  - Municipality: 46.63 sq mi (120.78 km^{2})

Population (2005)
  - Municipality: 8,254
  - Density: 177.0/sq mi (68.34/km^{2})
  - Urban: 2,046

Santa Lucía (Spanish pronunciation: [ˈsanta luˈsi.a]) is a municipality in the Boaco department of Nicaragua. It has a population of 10,300 (2006, est.) and an extension of 120.78 km^{2}. The capital is the town of Santa Lucía located 94 km from Managua. Approx. 72% of the population lives in rural areas and 28% in the urban zones.

== Overview ==
The economy is based mainly on agriculture with around 2,200 small farmers in the whole municipality. There are also some agropecuarian activities.

The mayor of the municipality of Santa Lucía is Elba Maria Salinas Guzmán from the Constitutional Liberal Party (PLC).

== History ==
Back in the days of the Spanish colony, the town of Santa Lucía was known as Potreritos (small pasturelands, in English) and was part of the municipality of Teustepe. The town was later renamed in honor of Saint Lucy.

On August 16, 1904, the town of Santa Lucía became the capital town of the homonymous municipality and part of the Boaco department.

== Local festivities ==
From December 10 to 17 in honor of Saint Lucy. The festivities continues on February 12 and 13. The municipality celebrates its patron with corridas, popular fiestas and religious activities during the festivities.
