= Niquinohomo FC =

Nicaraguan football club

- Full name: Niquinohomo Fútbol Club
- Founded: 2000
- Ground: Estadio Municipal de Niquinohomo; Niquinohomo, Masaya Department, Nicaragua
- Capacity: 1,000
- Manager: (Nicaragua) Rafael Meza
- League: Tercera División de Nicaragua
- Website: https://m.facebook.com/pages/category/Sports-Team/F%C3%BAtbol-Club-Niquinohomo-292452334814083/?locale2=es_LA pattern_la1=
Home colours	Away colours

Niquinohomo FC is a Nicaraguan football club from Niquinohomo, Masaya Department. It was founded on 2000 and currently plays on Tercera División de Nicaragua.
