= List of regions of Nicaragua by Human Development Index =

This is a list of departments of Nicaragua by Human Development Index as of 2023 with data for the year 2023.

Rank	Region (Departments of Nicaragua)	HDI (2023)
High human development
1	Pacifico (Jinotepe, Chinandega, Granada, León, Managua, Masaya, Rivas)	0.756
Medium human development
–	Nicaragua (average)	0.706
2	Central Norte (Boaco, Juigalpa, Estelí, Jinotega, Somoto, Matagalpa, Ocotal, San Carlos)	0.660
3	Atlantico (North Caribbean Coast, South Caribbean Coast)	0.593
