= 2021–22 Liga Primera =

Liga Primera
- Season: 2021–22
- Champions: Apertura: Diriangén; Clausura: Diriangén
- Relegated: Real Madriz
- CONCACAF League: Diriangén; Real Estelí FC
- Matches: 196
- Goals: 459 (2.34 per match)
- Top goalscorer: Apertura: (Brazil) Lucas dos Santos (11 goals); Clausura: (Nicaragua) Luis Manuel Galeano (14 goals)
- Biggest home win: Apertura: Deportivo Walter Ferretti 5–0 ART Municipal Jalapa (21 October 2021); Clausura: Diriangén F.C. 8–0 H&H Export
- Biggest away win: Apertura: UNAN Managua 3-5 Real Madriz; Clausura: Real Madriz 0–3 Juventus Managua; UNAN Managua 0–3 Diriangén F.C. Juventus Managua 0–3 Real Esteli F.C.
- Highest scoring: Apertura: H&H Export 4-8 Deportivo Walter Ferretti; Clausura: Diriangén F.C. 8–0 H&H Export
- All statistics correct as of 24 May 2022.

The 2021–22 Liga Primera de Nicaragua season was to be divided into two tournaments, Apertura and Clausura. The season will determine the 77th and 78th champions in the history of the Liga Primera de Nicaragua, the top division of football in Nicaragua. The Apertura tournament is to be played in the second half of 2021, while the Clausura is to be played in the first half of 2022.

== Teams ==
=== Team information ===
A total of ten teams contested the league, including nine sides from the 2020–21 Primera División, and one side from the 2020–21 Segunda División.

Junior Managua finished last in the aggregate table and were relegated to the Segunda División. The champions from the Segunda División, UNAN Managua, were promoted in their place.

The 9th place team in the aggregate table, Chinandega FC, faced the second-place team from the Segunda División, HyH Export de Sébaco, in a playoff for a spot in the Primera División. HyH Export de Sébaco won 5–3 over two legs, meaning Chinandega FC relegated from the Primera División.

=== Promotion and relegation ===
Promoted from Segunda División as of July, 2021.

- Champions: UNAN Managua
- Promotion playoff winner: HyH Export de Sébaco

Relegated to Segunda División as of May, 2021.

- Last Place: Junior Managua
- Promotion playoff loser: Chinandega FC

=== Stadiums and locations ===
Team	Location	Stadium	Capacity
ART Jalapa	Jalapa	Estadio Alejandro Ramos Turcio	2,000
Diriangén	Diriamba	Estadio Cacique Diriangén	8,500
Juventus Managua	Managua	Estadio	7,000
HYH Sebaco	Sebaco	Estadio Municipal de Matagalpa	1,800
Managua FC	Managua	Estadio Nacional de Fútbol (UNAN)	15,000
Deportivo Ocotal	Ocotal	Estadio Roy Fernando Bermúdez	7,000
Real Estelí	Esteli	Estadio Independencia	4,800
Real Madriz	Somoto	Estadio Solidaridad Augusto Cesar Mendoza	2,000
UNAN Managua	Managua	Estadio Nacional de Fútbol (UNAN)	15,000
Walter Ferretti	Managua	Estadio Nacional de Fútbol (UNAN)	15,000

=== Personnel and kits ===
Team	Chairman	Head coach	Captain	Kit manufacturer	Shirt sponsor(s)
ART Jalapa	TBD	(Nicaragua) Leonidas Rodriguez	(Nicaragua) TBD	Nike	AT&T
Diriangén	TBD	(Brazil) Flavio da Silva	(Nicaragua) TBD	Nike	AT&T
Juventus Managua	TBD	(Nicaragua) Oscar Blanco	(Nicaragua) TBD	Nike	AT&T
HYH Sebaco	TBD	(Argentina) Carlos Javier Martino	(Nicaragua) TBD	Nike	AT&T
Managua FC	TBD	(Nicaragua) Emilio Aburto	(Nicaragua) TBD	Nike	AT&T
Deportivo Ocotal	TBD	(Nicaragua) Mario Alfaro	(Nicaragua) TBD	Nike	AT&T
Real Estelí	TBD	(Mexico) José Luis Trejo	(Nicaragua) TBD	Nike	AT&T
Real Madriz	TBD	(Honduras) Héctor Medina	(Nicaragua) TBD	Nike	AT&T
UNAM Managua	TBD	(Nicaragua) Daniel Garcia	(Nicaragua) TBD	Nike	AT&T
Walter Ferretti	TBD	(Nicaragua) Henry Urbina	(Nicaragua) TBD	Nike	AT&T

== Other news ==
=== New ball provider ===
VOIT will be providing and major ball sponsor for 2020-2021

== Managerial changes ==
=== Pre-season Apertura 2021 ===
Team	Outgoing manager	Manner of departure	Date of vacancy	Replaced by	Date of appointment	Position in table
Real Estelí	(Nicaragua) Holver Flores	Contract Ended	June 2021	(Mexico) José Luis Trejo Montoya	June 2021	TBD (Apertura 2021)
HyH Export de Sébaco	(Nicaragua) Jorge Luis Vanegas	Contract Ended	June 2021	(Argentina) Carlos Javier Martino	June 2021	TBD (Apertura 2021)

=== During the Apertura season ===
Team	Outgoing manager	Manner of departure	Date of vacancy	Replaced by	Date of appointment	Position in table
Managua F.C.	(Nicaragua) Emilio Aburto	Sacked	August 2021	(Spain) Juan Cortés	September 2021	TBD (Apertura 2021)

=== Pre-season Clausura 2022 ===
Team	Outgoing manager	Manner of departure	Date of vacancy	Replaced by	Date of appointment	Position in table
Real Madriz	(Honduras) Héctor Medina	Contract Ended	December 2021	(Argentina) Roberto Chanampe	January 6, 2022	TBD (Apertura 2021)
ART Municipal Jalapa	(Nicaragua) Leonidas Rodriguez	Contract Ended	December 2021	(Honduras) Jose Ramon Romero	31 December 2021	TBD (Apertura 2021)
UNAN Managua	(Nicaragua) Daniel Garcia	Contract Ended	December 2021	(Nicaragua) Edward Urroz	December 2021	TBD (Apertura 2021)

=== During the Clausura season ===
Team	Outgoing manager	Manner of departure	Date of vacancy	Replaced by	Date of appointment	Position in table
Deportivo Walter Ferretti	(Nicaragua) Henry Urbina	Changed roles in the club	February 2022	(Nicaragua) Luis Diaz Gonzalez	February 2022	TBD (Clausura 2022)
Real Madriz	(Argentina) Roberto Chanampe	Mutual consent	March 2022	(Nicaragua) Miguel Angel Sanchez	March 2022	TBD (Clausura 2022)
ART Municipal Jalapa	(Honduras) Roman Romero	Resigned	March 2022	(Honduras) Hector Medina	March 2022	TBD (Clausura 2022)
Diriangén F.C.	(Brazil) Flavio Da Silva	Resigned	April 2022	(Nicaragua) Tyrone Leiva	April 2022	TBD (Clausura 2022)

== Apertura 2021 ==
=== Finals ===
- Qualified teams
  - Diriangén
  - Real Estelí

==== Final ====
===== First leg =====
12 December 2021
12:00 (UTC-6)

Diriangén	1-0	Real Estelí
Erick Tellez 22'		Nil

Estadio Cacique Diriangén, Diriamba
Referee: Erick Lezama

===== Second leg =====
19 December 2021
12:00 (UTC-6)

Real Estelí	0-0	Diriangén
Nil		Nil

Estadio Independencia, Esteli
Referee: Jorge Ojeda

Apertura 2021 champions

29th title

== Clausura 2022 ==
=== Personnel and kits ===
Team	Chairman	Head coach	Captain	Kit manufacturer	Shirt sponsor(s)
ART Jalapa	TBD	(Honduras) Jose Ramon Romero	(Nicaragua) TBD	Nil	Alcaldia de Jalapa
Diriangén	TBD	(Brazil) Flavio da Silva	(Nicaragua) TBD	Joma	Ftiness Force, JK Wireless, Claros, Betcris, Proplasa
Juventus Managua	TBD	(Nicaragua) Oscar Blanco	(Nicaragua) TBD	Nike	AT&T
HYH Sebaco	TBD	(Argentina) Carlos Javier Martino	(Nicaragua) TBD	Nil	Imponciones Loaisiga, HH Green Coffee, Siles Plantaes, Fachento
Managua	TBD	(Spain) Juan Cortés	(Nicaragua) TBD	Joma	Alcadia de Managua, Havelino, Fetesa
Ocotal	TBD	(Nicaragua) Mario Alfaro	(Nicaragua) TBD	Nil	Nil
Real Estelí	TBD	(Mexico) José Luis Trejo	(Nicaragua) TBD	Voit	Cafe Ox, Victoria Frost, Havoline, Fuente Fura
Real Madriz	TBD	(Argentina) Roberto Chanampe	(Nicaragua) TBD	Mannate Sport	Arie's Gym
UNAM Managua	TBD	(Nicaragua) Daniel Garcia	(Nicaragua) TBD	Joma	Nil
Walter Ferretti	TBD	(Nicaragua) Henry Urbina	(Nicaragua) TBD	Nil	Claro, MC mi close, Opticas MO, Ramos Laboratories

=== Finals ===
==== Quarterfinals ====
May 5, 2022

Deportivo Walter Ferretti	1-0	H&H Sebaco *
Ezequiel Ugalde 40'		Nil

Estadio

Walter Ferretti progressed. * Originally ART Jalapa had qualified however due to using five foreign players on the field at one time, which exceeded the rule which only allowed 4 players. ART Jalapa were stripped the victory therefore allowed H&H Sebaco to overtake them on the table

May 5, 2022

Managua	4-3	Juventus Managua
Peralta 2' 42'; Quinto 66'; Morillo 75'		Junior Arteaga 34' 46'; Dávila 67'

Estadio Cacique Diriangén, Diriamba

Managua FC progressed.

==== Semi-finals ====
Team 1	Agg.	Team 2	1st leg	2nd leg
Walter Ferretti	4-3	Real Estelí	2–3	2-0
Diriangén	2-1	Managua	1-1	1–0

May 8, 2022
16:00

Walter Ferretti	2-3	Real Estelí
Francisco Ramos 9'; Taufic Guarch 23'		Henry Niño 13'; Igor Neves 60'; Brandon Ayerdis 75'

Estadio

May 11, 2022

Real Estelí	0-2	Walter Ferretti
Nil		Francisco Ramos 77'; Bismarck Montiel 124'

Walter Ferretti won 4-3 on aggregate.

May 8, 2022
20:00

Managua	1-1	Diriangén
Nahun Peralta 54'		Luis Coronel 10'

May 11, 2022

Diriangén	1-0	Managua
Jaime Moreno 117'		Nil

Diriangen won 2-1 on aggregate.

==== Final ====
===== First leg =====
16 May 2022
19:00 (UTC-6)

Walter Ferretti	0-2	Diriangén
Nil		Jaime Moreno 7' 27'

Referee: Erick Lezama

===== Second leg =====
22 May 2022
18:00 (UTC-6)

Diriangén	0-2	Walter Ferretti
Nil		Guarch 12'; Ugalde 71'

Estadio Cacique Diriangén, Diriamba
Referee: Jorge Ojeda

2-2. Diriangen won 4-2 on penalties.

Clausura 2022 champions

30th title

== Aggregate table ==
Pos	Team	Pld	W	D	L	GF	GA	GD	Pts	Qualification or relegation
1	Diriangén	36	22	7	7	79	37	+42	73	CONCACAF League preliminary round (Note: As Apertura and Clausura runners-up (NCA2))
2	Real Estelí (Q)	36	21	7	8	78	42	+36	70	
3	Walter Ferretti	36	17	7	12	76	49	+27	58	CONCACAF League round of 16 (Note: As Apertura and Clausura champions (NCA1))
4	Managua (Q)	36	17	7	12	57	37	+20	58	
5	Juventus Managua	36	13	6	17	45	52	−7	45	
6	H&H Sebaco	36	9	14	13	56	69	−13	41	
7	Deportivo Ocotal	36	10	10	16	31	51	−20	40	
8	UNAN Managua	36	8	13	15	44	68	−24	37	
9	Municipal Jalapa (O)	36	9	10	17	25	59	−34	37	Relegation play-offs
10	Real Madriz	36	9	7	20	34	61	−27	34	Relegated to Segunda División

Source: Soccerway Soccerway
Rules for classification: 1) points; 2) goal difference; 3) number of goals scored.
(O) Play-off winners; (Q) Qualified for the phase indicated

== List of foreign players in the league ==
This is a list of foreign players in the 2020–21 season. The following players:

1. Have played at least one game for the respective club.
2. Have not been capped for the Nicaragua national football team on any level, independently from the birthplace

A new rule was introduced this season, that clubs can have four foreign players per club and can only add a new player if there is an injury or a player/s is released, and it is before the closing of the season transfer window.

ART Jalapa

- (Colombia) David Pinilla
- (Colombia) Jafet del Portillo
- (Honduras) Allan Medina

Diriangén

- (Argentina) Jonathan Pacheco
- (Argentina) Carlos Tórres
- (Brazil) Robinson Luiz
- (Uruguay) Bernando Laureiro
- (Colombia) Jhon Mosquera

Juventus Managua

- (Colombia) Kevin Obregón
- (Mexico) Bernardo Gradilla
- (Brazil) Rafael Vieira
- (Paraguay) Alexander Moreno
- (Mexico) Carlos Felix

HYH Sebaco

- (Argentina) Miguel Pucharella (*)
- (Costa Rica) Sebastián Barquero (*)
- (Honduras) Brayan Zúñiga (*)
- (Venezuela) Miguel Soza (*)

Managua

- (Brazil) Lucas Dos Santos
- (Venezuela) Edward Morillo
- (Brazil) Leandro Barbosa
- (Spain) Pablo Gállego
- (Argentina) Luciano Sanhueza
- (Argentina) Federico Vasilchick
- (Argentina) Carlos López Quintero

Ocotal

- (Colombia) Kenverlen López
- (Honduras) Gabriel Ortiz
- (Honduras) Carlos Daniel Duran
- (Honduras) Ricardo Medina

Real Estelí

- (Argentina) Luis Acuna
- (Argentina) Lautaro Ceratto
- (Brazil) Vitor Faiska
- (Brazil) Vinicius da Souza
- (Spain) Bidari García

Real Madriz

- (Colombia) Jamilton Moreno
- (Colombia) Nicolas Quinonez
- (Colombia) Bryan Mojica
- (Honduras) Kevin Castro (*)
- (Honduras) Edwin Castro (*)
- (Honduras) Santiago Paredes (*)
- (United States) TBD

UNAM Managua

- (Ghana) Joseph Donkor (*)
- (Togo) Donouvi Blaise (*)

Walter Ferretti

- (Argentina) Brian Calabrese (*)
- (Mexico) Carlos Castro (*)
- (Colombia) Maykel Reyes (*)
- (Mexico) Taufic Guarch (*)
- (Mexico) Diego Casas (*)

(player released during the Apertura season) (player released between the Apertura and Clausura seasons) (player released during the Clausura season)
