= Ricardo Mendieta =

Nicaraguan footballer

Personal information
- Full name: Ricardo Mendieta
- Date of birth: 18 January 1995 (age 31)
- Place of birth: Nicaragua
- Position: Forward

Team information
- Current team: Deportivo Las Sabanas

Senior career*
Years	Team	Apps	(Gls)
2015–2016	Real Estelí	1	(0)
2017–2019	Juventus Managua	38	(7)
2019–	Deportivo Las Sabanas	14	(4)

International career^{‡}
2019–	Nicaragua	1	(1)
- * Club domestic league appearances and goals as of 3 November 2019 ‡ National team caps and goals as of 14 October 2019

Ricardo Mendieta (born on 19 January 1995) is a Nicaraguan professional football player who plays for Deportivo Las Sabanas and the Nicaragua national team.

He debuted internationally on 14 October 2019, scoring in the last minute of a 0–4 victory against Dominica, leading to Dominica's relegation to League C in the CONCACAF Nations League.

== International goals ==
Scores and results list Nicaragua's goal tally first.

No.	Date	Venue	Opponent	Score	Result	Competition
1.	14 October 2019	Windsor Park, Roseau, Dominica	Dominica	4–0	4–0	2019–20 CONCACAF Nations League B
