= Shomari Francis =

U.S. Virgin Island soccer player

Personal information
- Date of birth: March 31, 2001 (age 25)
- Place of birth: Saint Croix, U.S. Virgin Islands
- Height: 5 ft 11 in (1.80 m)
- Position: Forward

College career
Years	Team	Apps	(Gls)
2019–	UVI Buccaneers		

Senior career*
Years	Team	Apps	(Gls)
- Prankton SC

International career^{‡}
2019–	U.S. Virgin Islands	2	(0)
- * Club domestic league appearances and goals as of 13:05, 2 April 2021 (UTC) ‡ National team caps and goals as of 13:05, 2 April 2021 (UTC)

Shomari Francis (born March 31, 2001) is a U.S. Virgin Island soccer player who plays as a forward for the UVI Buccaneers and the U.S. Virgin Islands.

== Club career ==
In May 2017 Francis was part of the St. Croix team which represented the island at the annual Territorial Youth Sports Games. He scored against a St. Thomas team in the opening match but St. Croix fell 1–4. In July 2017 he was part of the Virgin Islands American Youth Soccer Organization under-19 team that competed in the Dana Cup in Hjørring, Denmark.

After graduation from high school in June 2019, Francis announced his intentions to attend the University of the Virgin Islands and play for its soccer team. In October 2019 he appeared for the club in several matches including against Webber International Warriors on October 2 and Southeastern Fire two days later.

He has also played for Prankton SC of the U.S. Virgin Islands Premier League. He scored a goal against Helenites SC in the opening match of the 2019 season. He scored two more goals against LaRaza on Matchday 8.

== International career ==
Francis was part of the USVI under-20 squad that competed in the 2018 CONCACAF U-20 Championship. In 2019 he was named to the under-23 squad that took part in qualification for the 2020 Summer Olympics. He was part of the under-20 squad again for 2020 CONCACAF U-20 Championship qualifying and scored the team's opening goal of a 3–2 victory against Saint Vincent and the Grenadines in the USVI's final match.

Francis was called up for the inaugural CONCACAF Nations League in August 2019. He made his senior international debut on November 19, 2019 in a League C loss to Saint Martin. In March 2021, Ramos was named as part of Gilberto Damiano's 23-man squad for 2022 FIFA World Cup qualification matches later that month.

== Career statistics ==
=== International ===
As of match played March 21, 2021.

National team	Year	Apps	Goals
United States Virgin Islands	2019	1	0
United States Virgin Islands	2020	0	0
United States Virgin Islands	2021	1	0
Total		2	0
