= Salem Tipitapa =

Nicaraguan football club

- Full name: Salem Tipitapa
- Ground: Tipitapa, Nicaragua
- Chairman: Carlos Sandoval
- Manager: Jorge Linhares
- League: Segunda División de Nicaragua
- 2014 Clausura: 7th (Group A)

Salem Tipitapa is a Nicaraguan football team playing in the second division of the Nicaragua football system. It is based near Tipitapa.

== Achievements ==
- Segunda División de Nicaragua: 0
  TBD

== List of coaches ==
- (Brazil) Jorge Linhares (July 2014–)

== See also ==
- Segunda División de Nicaragua
