= Deportivo Las Sabanas =

Nicaraguan football club

- Full name: Deportivo Las Sabanas
- Founded: 2009
- Ground: Municipal de Las Sabanas; Las Sabanas, Nicaragua
- Manager: Jorge Vanegas
- League: Nicaraguan Primera División
Home colours

Deportivo Las Sabanas is a Nicaraguan football team currently playing in the Nicaraguan Primera División. They are based in Las Sabanas.

== History ==
The club was first founded in 2009 at Las Sabanas; during this period they were crowned champion of the third division after winning 6–1 on aggregate against Brumas FC de Jinotega.

The Club won promotion to the primera division, after winning the Champions/Promotion playoff against FC Gutiérrez 3–2 2019 season and for the first time in the club history.

== Current squad ==
Squad as of 6 November 2019.

Note: Flags indicate national team as defined under FIFA eligibility rules; some limited exceptions apply. Players may hold more than one non-FIFA nationality.

No.	Pos.	Nation	Player
—	GK	NCA	Erick Alemán
—	GK	COL	Didier Mosquera
—	DF	MEX	Luis Carbajal
—	DF	NCA	Andy Herrera
—	DF	NCA	Leonard Hodgson
—	DF	NCA	Carlos Peña
—	MF	NCA	Randy Benavides
—	MF	NCA	Eduardo Corrales
—	MF	NCA	Sined Espinoza
—	MF	NCA	Jefferson Lopez
—	MF	NCA	Jonathan Gallo
—	MF	NCA	Jeffry Pérez
—	MF	NCA	Enoc Salgado
—	MF	NCA	Jaffeth Salgado
—	FW	NCA	Yader Vásquez
—	FW	NCA	Adolfo Bermúdez
—	FW	USA	Edson Contreras
—	FW	MEX	Rogelio Espinoza
—	FW	NCA	Leonardo González
—	FW	NCA	Anner López
—	FW	NCA	Jose Martínez
—	FW	NCA	Ricardo Mendieta
—	FW	NCA	Ismael Mendieta

== Achievements ==
- Segunda División de Nicaragua: 1
  2019
- Tercera División de Nicaragua: 1
  2009

== List of coaches ==
- (Nicaragua) Miguel Angel Sanchez
- (Nicaragua) Luis Vega
