= Football in Nicaragua =

- Country: Nicaragua
- Governing body: Nicaraguan Football Federation
- National team: Men's national team
- First played: 1862

National competitions
- Nicaraguan Primera División

International competitions
- CONCACAF Champions Cup; CONCACAF Central American Cup; FIFA Club World Cup; CONCACAF Gold Cup (National Team); CONCACAF Nations League (National Team); FIFA World Cup (National Team); CONCACAF Women's Championship (National Team); CONCACAF W Gold Cup (National Team); FIFA Women's World Cup (National Team)

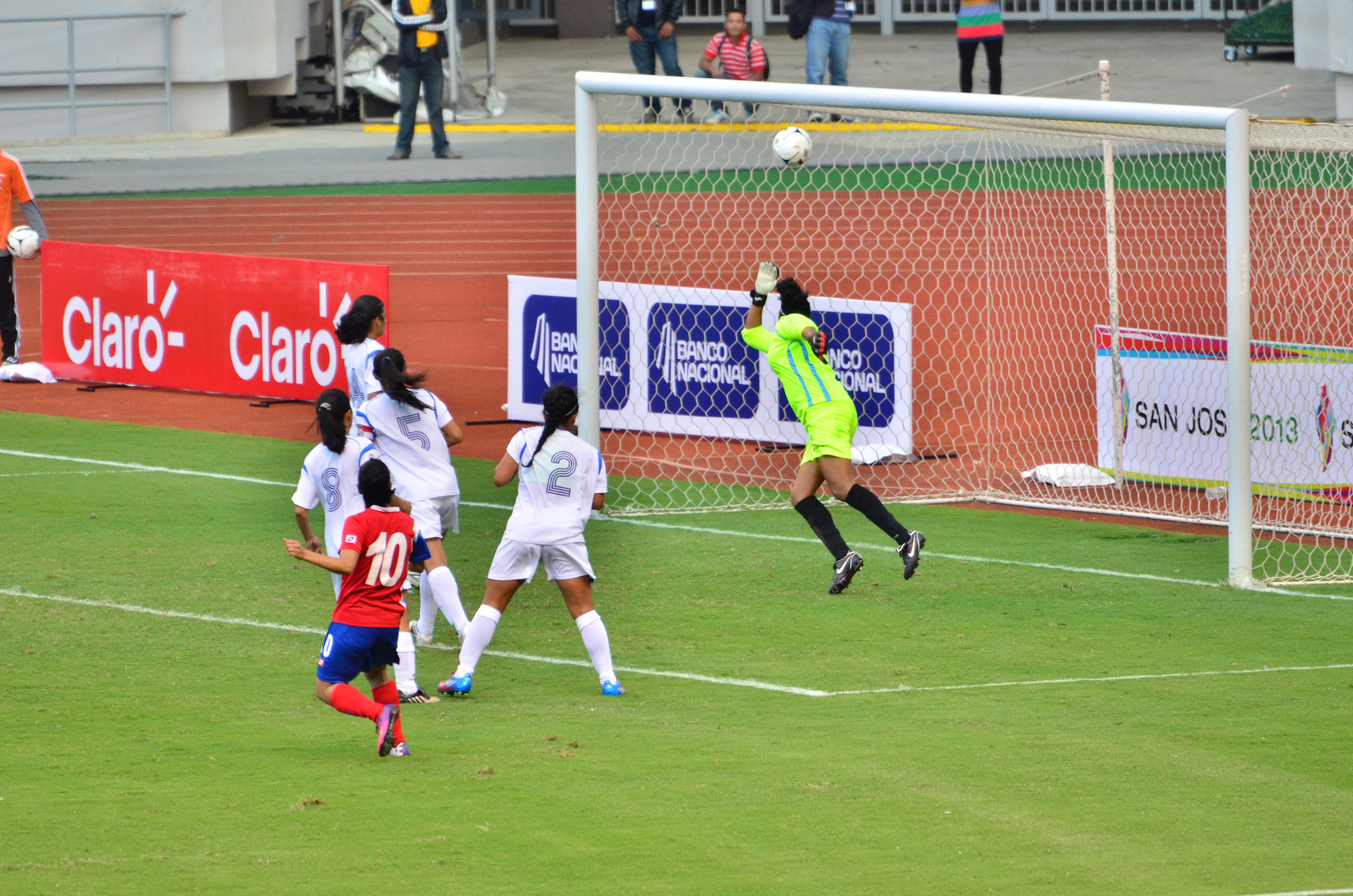
Nicaragua vs Costa Rica final, women's football at the 2013 Central American Games in San José, Costa Rica.

With over two million football fans, football is the second most popular sport in Nicaragua after baseball.

== League system ==
Level	League(s)/Division(s)
1	Primera División; 10 clubs
	↓↑ 1-2 clubs
2	Segunda División; 19 clubs + 1 Reserve team divided in 2 series of 10 clubs
	↓↑ 2 clubs
3	Tercera Division de Nicaragua; 40 clubs divided in 4 series of 10

== Football stadiums ==
Stadium	Capacity	Tenants	Image
Estadio Nacional de Fútbol de Nicaragua	20,000	Nicaragua national football team, UNAN Managua	

== Attendances ==
The average attendance per top-flight football league season and the club with the highest average attendance:

Season	League average	Best club	Best club average
2023 Apertura	763	Real Estelí	1,337

Source: League page on Wikipedia

== See also ==
- Lists of stadiums
