= Complejo deportivo de Bayaguana =

Soccer stadium in the Dominican Republic

- Location: Bayaguana, Monte Plata, Dominican Republic
- Owner: Monte Plata Government
- Operator: Delfines Del Este
- Capacity: 1,800
- Surface: grass

Tenant
- Delfines Del Este

Complejo deportivo de Bayaguana is a soccer stadium in Bayaguana, Dominican Republic. It is currently used for football matches and hosts the home games of Delfines Del Este of the Liga Dominicana de Fútbol. The stadium holds 1,800 spectators.
