= Real Xolotlán =

Nicaraguan football club

- Full name: Real Xolotlán
- Nickname: Adueñándose
- Ground: Managua, Nicaragua
- League: Segunda División de Nicaragua
Home colours	Away colours

Real Xolotlán is a Nicaraguan football team playing in the second division of the Nicaragua football system. It is based near Lake Xolotlan communities, Managua.

== Achievements ==
- Segunda División de Nicaragua: 0
  TBD

== See also ==
- Segunda División de Nicaragua
