= Nandasmo =

- Municipality
- Location in Nicaragua
- Coordinates: 11°56′N 86°07′W
- Country: Nicaragua
- Department: Masaya

Area
  - Municipality: 6.81 sq mi (17.63 km^{2})

Population (2020)
  - Municipality: 16,418
  - Density: 2,412/sq mi (931.3/km^{2})
  - Urban: 6,902
- Climate: Aw

Nandasmo is a municipality in the Masaya department of Nicaragua.

== Economy ==
Nandasmo is largely driven by agriculture and handicrafts. The town's artisans produce a variety of handcrafted goods.
