= Zumo =

Juice and smoothie bar chain

- Industry: Restaurants
- Headquarters: Ireland
- Number of locations: 100
- Area served: Europe
- Key people: Cathal Power

Zumo is a juice and smoothie bar chain in Europe with over 100 establishments in 13 countries. The company, established in 2001 and based out of Ireland, operates locations in Ireland, the United Kingdom, Spain, France, Austria, Greece, Russia, Hungary, Switzerland, Czech Republic, Turkey, Italy, Germany and South Africa. The word 'zumo' is Spanish for 'juice'.

== History ==
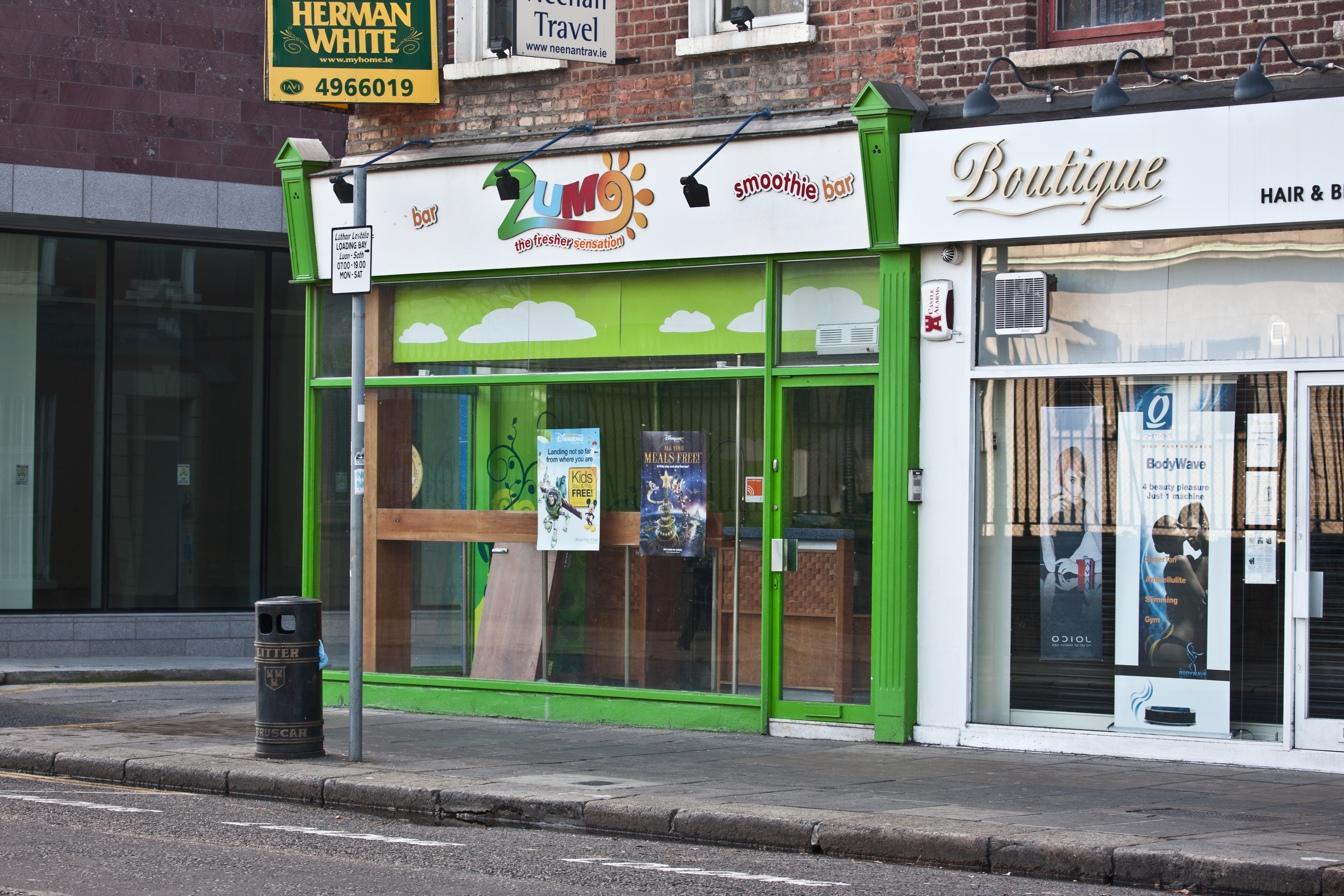
A Zumo smoothie bar in Dublin

Cathal Power established Zumo Smoothie Bars in 2000. The first bar, opened in November 2001, in the Jervis Shopping Centre in central Dublin city in Ireland.

There are both franchisees and stores operated directly by the company. Cathal Power did not originally intend to franchise the concept. However, after the first six months, he began to convert the concept to a franchise.

== Menu ==
Zumo offer a range of both smoothies and juices. Most drinks utilise freshly squeezed orange juice, although many use fresh apple or pear juice in its place. Zumo also offer a range of nutritional supplements called Boosts. These include protein and wheatgrass. In some stores they also sell wraps, parfaits, fruit salads, soup and other light options.

All of their recipes are designed in Zumo's test kitchen.

== Insolvency ==
In 2010 Mediterranean Food and Wine Ltd, the company which operates the Zumo Juice and Smoothie bars, sought the protection of the Irish High Court from its creditors.
