= Manuel Cuadra =

Nicaraguan footballer

Personal information
- Full name: Manuel Cuadra Serrano
- Date of birth: August 25, 1947 (age 79)
- Place of birth: Diriamba, Nicaragua
- Height: 1.78 m (5 ft 10 in)
- Position: Striker

Senior career*
Years	Team	Apps	(Gls)
1966–1968	Diriangén		
1968–1972	Flor de Caña		
1972–1976	Diriangén		

International career
1967	Nicaragua		
- * Club domestic league appearances and goals

Manuel Cuadra Serrano (born August 25, 1947) is a former Nicaraguan footballer. Cuadra represented Nicaragua at the 1975 Pan American Games.

== Club career ==
Nicknamed Catarrito, during his career he played for Diriangén, and Flor de Caña.

He started his footballing career at the age of 9, with the Los Caciques de Chichota Sibas team in 1956 .

He debuted in the First Division in 1967 with Diriangén scoring his first goal against Dinamo del Tte . His last goal was scored in 1985 with the UCA team against Búfalos. He played 662 games in the First Division, scoring 742 goals, with an average of 1.10 goals per game. He took 103 penalties in his career, of which 95 were scored and 8 were missed.

In 1972 he scored 9 goals in a game against Atléticos. He currently has a national record, since 1969, with 44 goals scored in a tournament with the Flor de Caña team. In 111 International games he scored 59 goals. He was International Top Scorer at the Central American Games in El Salvador in 1977, he shared it with Mágico González, from El Salvador.

He obtained 14 Individual Going Championships, 8 National Tournaments in: 1968, 1969, 1972, 1974, 1975, 1976, 1977 and 1982 and 6 Cup Tournaments in 1968, 1969, 1971, 1973, 1974 and 1975.

He was twice National Champion as a member of a team, 8 times Champion in the National First Division Tournament and 4 times National Cup Champion. He was coach of the National Team in the NORSECA Juvenil in Mexico in 1973 and of the Senior Team in 1985. In 1985 he traveled to San Francisco and in 1987 he moved to Miami, where he currently resides.
