= Liga Ascenso =

Nicaraguan association football league

- Founded: 2008
- Country: Nicaragua
- Number of clubs: 20
- Level on pyramid: 2
- Promotion to: Liga Primera
- Relegation to: Campeonato Nacional de Segunda División
- Current champions: San Marcos (2026 Clausura)
- Most championships: Chinandega FC (4 Times)
- Website: Website
- Current: 2026 Clausura

The Liga de Ascenso de Nicaragua is the second tier of Nicaraguan football. It is organized by the FENIFUT.

== Format ==
Torneo de Apertura (Opening tournament) and Torneo de Clausura (Closure Tournament). The Apertura champion each year will play the champion of the respective Clausura tournament, in order to determine who will ascend to the Primera Division, or if occasion arises, the team that manages to win two tournaments in a year, amount direct without having to play a game round. while the loser or the team with the best position on the table will face the 9th placed team in the primera division in a playoff to determine who will be promoted.

== 2025–26 teams ==
- Masachapa FC
- Ocotal
- San Marcos
- Rio Blanco
- Pumas FC Dario
- Catarina FC
- Tigres de Chinandega
- Matiguas FC
- Juventus Managua
- Deportivo Masaya
- FC Esteli
- Bravos del Primavera
- Blancos FC
- Junior de Managua

== Former teams ==
- Real Estelí B
- Atlético Somotillo
- La Concha FC
- ART Municipal Jalapa
- Lianziur Masatepelt
- San Juan de Oriente FC
- Bóer FC
- Real Xolotlan
- CS Municipal
- América JDE
- FC Brumas Jinotega
- La Paz Carazo
- Cachorros FC
- Real Madriz
- Nandasmo F.C.
- Chinandega FC
- Rancho Santana FC
- H&H Export Sébaco
- UNAN Managua
- Las Sabanas

== List of champions ==
- 2008–09: Chinandega
- 2010 Apertura: Juventus
- 2011 Clausura: Chinandega FC
- 2012 Clausura: UNAN Managua
- 2012 Apertura: Municipal Jalapa
- 2013 Clausura: Municipal Jalapa
- 2013 Apertura: UNAN Managua
- 2014 Clausura: Real Estelí B
- 2014 Apertura: Chinandega FC
- 2016 Clausura: Sebaco
- 2016 Apertura: Nandasmo F.C.
- 2017 Clausura: Deportivo Ocotal
- 2017 Apertura: San Francisco Masachapa
- 2018 Clausura: Municipal Jalapa
- 2019 Clausura: Las Sabanas
- 2019 Apertura: CD Junior
- 2020 Apertura: UNAN Managua
- 2021 Clausura: H&H Export Sébaco
- 2021 Apertura: CD Junior
- 2022 Clausura: Matagalpa FC
- 2022 Apertura: Chinandega FC
- 2023 Clausura: Masachapa FC
- 2023 Apertura: Juventus Managua
- 2024 Clausura: Rancho Santana FC
- 2024 Apertura: Club Deportivo Rio Blanco
- 2025 Clausura: Real Madriz
- 2025 Apertura: FC San Marcos
- 2026 Clausura: FC San Marcos
- 2026 Apertura: TBD
- 2027 Clausura: TBD

== See also ==
- Football in Nicaragua – overview of football sport
