= Boaco Department =

Department of Nicaragua

Coordinates: 12°28′N 85°40′W

Boaco Departamento de Boaco
- Department
- Flag Coat of arms

- Location within Nicaragua
- Country: Nicaragua
- Capital: Boaco

Area
  - Total: 4,177 km^{2} (1,613 sq mi)

Population (2023 estimate)>
  - Total: 188,809
  - Density: 45.20/km^{2} (117.1/sq mi)
- ISO 3166 code: NI-BO

Boaco (Spanish pronunciation: [boˈa.ko]) is an administrative division and a department in Nicaragua. It was formed in 1935. It covers an area of 4,177 km^{2} (1,613 sq mi) and had an estimated population of 188,809 in 2023. It is located in the central region of the country, with its capital in the city of Boaco.

== Etymology ==
The name Boaco originates from indigenous linguistic roots associated with the Aztecs. The term is derived from "Boa/Boaj" meaning "enchanters" and the suffix "O" meaning "place or town", meaning "Town or Place of Enchanters".

== History ==
The original settlement, which was known as Boaco Viejo, was destroyed in the mid-18th century by the Zambos, Caribs, and Miskitos, who were supported by the British forces. The remaining survivors relocated to the banks of the Malacatoya River and later established a new settlement that eventually evolved into the modern city of Boaco between 1752 and 1772. The settlement was elevated to villa status in 1876 and was granted city status in 1895. Boaco Department was officially created on 18 July 1935.

== Geography ==
Boaco is located in the central region of Nicaragua. The department covers an area of 4,177 km^{2} (1,613 sq mi). The capital of Boaco, is situated approximately 88 km (55 mi) from the national capital of Managua. The department consists of six municipalities: Boaco, Camoapa, San José de los Remates, San Lorenzo, Santa Lucía, and Teustepe.

The department forms part of the Nicaragua’s central highlands, and the terrain is irregular and predominantly mountainous. The average elevation ranges between 200 to 300 m (660 to 980 ft) with the highest point at Cerro de la Vieja at 1,200 m (3,900 ft). There are several valleys amongst the mountains such as Santa Lucía and San José de los Remates. The city of Boaco is situated on a steep terrain at a significant elevation from the surrounding neighborhoods. It is divided into upper and lower urban zones (Boaco Alto and Boaco Bajo), which are connected by steep stairways and streets. A viewpoint, known as El Faro, was built in 1995, and provides panoramic views of the city.

The climate is humid and varies from tropical savannah to tropical forest climate depending on the elevation and location.

== Demographics ==
Boaco Department had an estimated population of 188,809 inhabitants in 2023. The population is largely rural, with an economy strongly based on agriculture and livestock production. The region is part of Nicaragua’s cattle-ranching zone, with the production of dairy and meat products forming a key economic activity. Secondary economic activities include small-scale manufacturing and rural industries. The department is also known for its rural and cultural tourism, which includes visits to natural landscapes, rural communities, and experiencing traditional cultural practices.

== Culture ==
Boaco is known for its traditional dances and handicrafts. The dance-drama "Dance of Moors and Christians", performed in honor of apostle Santiago, who is the patron saint. The performance includes dancers forming groups representing the Moors and Christians, accompanied by music from drums and other instruments. The dance symbolizes the conflict between good and evil, and ends with the symbolic baptism of the defeated Moorish king.
