= 2020–21 Liga Primera =

Liga Primera
- Season: 2020–21
- Champions: Apertura: Real Estelí; Clausura: Diriangén FC
- Relegated: Junior Managua; Chinandega
- CONCACAF League: Real Estelí; Diriangén FC
- Matches played: 196
- Goals scored: 459 (2.34 per match)
- Top goalscorer: Apertura: (Mexico) TBD (TBD goals); Clausura: (Mexico) TBD (TBD goals)
- Biggest home win: Apertura: TBD 5–0 TBD (26 October 2019); Clausura: TBD 7–0 TBD
- Biggest away win: Apertura: TBD 1–4 TBD; Clausura: TBD 0–2 TBD
- Highest scoring: Apertura: TBD 3–3 TBD; Clausura: TBD 7–0 TBD
- All statistics correct as of 9 May 2020.

The 2020–21 Liga Primera de Nicaragua season was divided into two tournaments, Apertura and Clausura. The season determined the 75th and 76th champions in the history of the Liga Primera de Nicaragua, the top division of football in Nicaragua. The Apertura tournament was played in the second half of 2020, while the Clausura was played in the first half of 2021.

== Format ==
The Apertura playoff format was changed from previous years, while the Clausura used the same 4-team playoff format. For the Apertura, the top four teams from the regular stage advanced to a "quadrangular" double-round robin instead of a playoff stage. The regular stage and quadrangular winners played to decide the tournament's champion, but ultimately the same team won both and the final was not necessary. The same format was recently adopted by the Costa Rican Primera División, but for both half seasons.

== Team information ==
A total of ten teams contested the league, including nine sides from the 2019–20 Primera División, and one side from the 2019–20 Segunda División.

UNAN Managua finished last in the aggregate table and were relegated to the Segunda División. The champions from the Segunda División, Deportivo Las Sabanas, were promoted in their place.

The 9th place team in the aggregate table, ART Jalapa, faced the second-place team from the Segunda División, Deportivo Masaya, in a playoff for a spot in the Primera División. ART Jalapa won 4–3 over two legs, meaning ART Jalapa remained in Primera División.

=== Promotion and relegation ===
Promoted from Segunda División

- Champions: Junior de Managua

Relegated to Segunda División

- Last Place: Deportivo Las Sabanas

== Other news ==
=== New ball provider ===
VOIT will be providing and major ball sponsor for 2020-2021

== Managerial changes ==
=== Pre-season Apertura 2020 ===
Team	Outgoing manager	Manner of departure	Date of vacancy	Replaced by	Date of appointment	Position in table
Juventus Managua	(Nicaragua) Jaime Ruiz	Interimship ended	May 2020	(Nicaragua) Oscar Blanco	May 2020	TBD (Apertura 2019)
Junior de Managua	(Nicaragua)	Sacked	May 2020	(Nicaragua) Tyrone Acevedo	May 2020	TBD (Apertura 2019)
Real Madriz	(Panama) Juan Ramirez	Contract finished	May 2020	(Nicaragua) Carlos Matamoros	May 2020	TBD (Apertura 2019)
ART Jalapa	(El Salvador) Angel Orellana	Contract finished	May 2020	(Argentina) Carlos Javier Martino	May 2020	TBD (Apertura 2019)
Deportivo Ocotal	(Honduras) Reynaldo Clavasquín	Sacked	May 2020	(Honduras) Elvin Díaz	May 2020	TBD (Apertura 2019)

=== During the Apertura season ===
Team	Outgoing manager	Manner of departure	Date of vacancy	Replaced by	Date of appointment	Position in table
Deportivo Ocotal	(Honduras) Elvin Diaz	TBD	Oct 2020	(Honduras) Marcos Rivera	Oct 2020	TBD (Apertura 2020)

=== Pre-season Apertura 2020 ===
Team	Outgoing manager	Manner of departure	Date of vacancy	Replaced by	Date of appointment	Position in table
Real Madriz	(Nicaragua) Carlos Matamoros	Contract finished	2020	(Nicaragua) Ronaldo Alvarado	2021	TBD (Apertura 2021)
Deportivo Ocotal	(Honduras) Marcos Rivera	Contract finished	December 2020	(Nicaragua) Mario Alfaro	January 2021	TBD (Apertura 2021)

=== Clausura 2021 ===
Team	Outgoing manager	Manner of departure	Date of vacancy	Replaced by	Date of appointment	Position in table
Real Madriz	(Nicaragua) Ronaldo Alvarado	Contract finished	March 2021	(Honduras) Hector Medina	March 2021	TBD (Clausura 2021)

== Apertura ==
=== Personnel and sponsoring ===
Team	Manager	Captain	Kit manufacturer	Kit sponsors
ART Municipal Jalapa	(Argentina) Carlos Javier Martino	(Nicaragua)	Joma	Alcadia de Jalapa
Chinandega	(Nicaragua) Reyna Espinoza	(Nicaragua) Lester Espinoza	Nil	Nil
Diriangén FC	(Brazil) Flavio da Silva	(Nicaragua) Ereck Tellez	Joma	Claro, Victoria frost,Cafe Ox, Flor de Cana, Electrolit
Junior Managua	(Nicaragua) Tyrone Acevedo	(Nicaragua) Carlos Membreno	Joma	Oceanica, MT-MultiTrans
Juventus Managua	(Nicaragua) Oscar Blanco	(Honduras)	Nil	Nil
Managua	(Nicaragua) Emilio Aburto	(Nicaragua) Nahum Peralta	Joma	Alcadia de Managua, Ravoline
Ocotal	(Honduras) Elvin Díaz	(Nicaragua) Guillermo Espino	Nil	Alcadia de Ocotal
Real Estelí	(Nicaragua) Holver Flores	(Nicaragua) (Mexico) Manual Rosas	Kappa	Beco, Movi star, La Curaçao, Banpro, Vitalsis
Real Madriz	(Nicaragua) Carlos Matamoros	(Nicaragua)	Joma	Alcadia de Somoto
Walter Ferretti	(Nicaragua) Henry Urbina	(Nicaragua) Denis Espinoza	Joma	Claro, MC

=== Standings ===
Pos	Team	Pld	W	D	L	GF	GA	GD	Pts	Qualification
1	Real Estelí (C)	18	11	5	2	32	13	+19	38	Advance to Playoffs (Semifinals)
2	Walter Ferretti	18	9	5	4	29	17	+12	32	Advance to Playoffs (Semifinals)
3	Municipal Jalapa	18	8	6	4	20	15	+5	30	Advance to Playoffs (Quarterfinals)
4	Diriangén (A)	18	8	5	5	29	21	+8	29	Advance to Playoffs (Quarterfinals)
5	Juventus Managua	18	6	5	7	23	25	−2	23	Advance to Playoffs (Quarterfinals)
6	Chinandega	18	5	6	7	21	35	−14	21	Advance to Playoffs (Quarterfinals)
7	Managua	18	5	4	9	24	30	−6	19	
8	Deportivo Ocotal	18	5	4	9	20	25	−5	19	
9	Real Madriz	18	3	7	8	17	24	−7	16	
10	Junior	18	2	9	7	16	26	−10	15	

Updated to match(es) played on 3 August 2020. Source: Liga Primera
Rules for classification: 1) points; 2) goal difference; 3) number of goals scored; 4) head-to-head points; 5) head-to-head goal difference; 6) head-to-head goals scored; 7) draw.
(A) Advance to a further round; (C) Champions

=== Results ===
Home \ Away	REE	WAF	MCJ	DRI	JVM	CHI	MAN	DPO	RMA	JUN
Real Estelí	—	1–1	2–1	1–0	3–0	3–0		2–1	2–0	
Walter Ferretti	0–0	—	0–0	0–1	0–1		4–2	2–0	3–1	1–0
Municipal Jalapa	1–0	3–0	—	2–0	1–0	1–1	1–0	2–0		1–0
Diriangén	2–2	0–1	1–1	—	1–0	2–0	0–0		3–1	3–2
Juventus Managua	1–4	1–3	2–2	3–1	—	5–1	2–3	1–0	1–0	1–1
Chinandega	1–5	2–2		1–3	3–2	—	0–0	4–2	1–1	2–2
Managua	3–4	1–2	3–1		0–1	1–0	—	2–2	0–1	2–0
Deportivo Ocotal	0–1		0–0	1–0	0–0	1–2	5–0	—	1–1	3–1
Real Madriz	1–0	2–2	3–0	1–1		0–1	0–2	0–1	—	1–1
Junior	0–0	0–4	1–0	1–1		0–1	2–2	1–0	2–2	—

Updated to match(es) played on 3 August 2020. Source: Liga Primera
Legend: Blue = home team win; Yellow = draw; Red = away team win.

=== Finals ===
==== Quarterfinals ====
23 November 2019

Municipal Jalapa	0–2	Chinandega F.C.
Nil		Adolfo Colindres own 7'; Erick Alcazar 47'

Estadio Alejandro Ramos Turcio, Jalapa

Chinandega progressed.

23 November 2020

Diriangen	2–0	Juventus Managua
Luis Coronel 16'; Bernando Laurerio 29'		Nil

Estadio Cacique Diriangén, Diriamba

Diriangen progressed.

==== Semi-finals ====
Team 1	Agg.	Team 2	1st leg	2nd leg
Walter Ferretti	3–6	Diriangén	2–3	1–3
Real Estelí	3–2	Chinandega	2–2	1–0

29 November 2020

Diriangén	3–2	Walter Ferretti
Henry Nino own 59'; Maycon 62'; Rene Huete own 83'		Dshon Forbes 13'; Ezequiel Ugalde 34'

Estadio Cacique Diriangén, Diriamba

7 December 2020

Walter Ferretti	1–3	Diriangén
Rene Huete 72'		Alexis Ramos 18' 22'; Maycon 44'

Diriagen won 6-3 on aggregate.

30 November 2020

Chinandega	2–2	Real Estelí
Kevin Vinerio 69'; Erick Alcazar 88'		Edgar Castillo 37'; Brandon Ayerdis 61'

Estadio La Veranera , La Veranera

7 December 2020

Real Estelí	1–0	Chinandega
Josué Quijano 15'		Nil

Real Esteli won 3–2 on aggregate.

==== Final ====
Team 1	Agg.	Team 2	1st leg	2nd leg
Diriangén	0–1	Real Estelí	0–0	0–1

14 December 2020

Diriangén	0–0	Real Estelí

Estadio Cacique Diriangén, Diriamba
Referee: Erick Lezama

21 December 2020

Real Estelí	1–0	Diriangén

Estadio Nacional de Fútbol de Nicaragua, Managua
Referee: Nitzar Sandoval

== Clausura ==
=== Standings ===
Pos	Team	Pld	W	D	L	GF	GA	GD	Pts	Qualification
1	Diriangén (Q)	18	13	1	4	36	16	+20	40	Advance to Playoffs (Semifinals)
2	Real Estelí (Q)	18	12	2	4	34	13	+21	38	Advance to Playoffs (Semifinals)
3	Managua (Q)	18	10	3	5	41	23	+18	33	Advance to Playoffs (Quarterfinals)
4	Walter Ferretti (Q)	18	10	3	5	29	17	+12	33	Advance to Playoffs (Quarterfinals)
5	Deportivo Ocotal (Q)	18	7	5	6	22	21	+1	26	Advance to Playoffs (Quarterfinals)
6	Real Madriz	18	6	3	9	18	26	−8	21	Advance to Playoffs (Quarterfinals)
7	Municipal Jalapa	18	4	5	9	21	32	−11	17	
8	Junior	18	4	4	10	16	33	−17	16	
9	Juventus Managua	18	4	3	11	17	33	−16	15	
10	Chinandega	18	3	5	10	17	37	−20	14	

Updated to match(es) played on 3 August 2020. Source: Liga Primera
Rules for classification: 1) points; 2) goal difference; 3) number of goals scored; 4) head-to-head points; 5) head-to-head goal difference; 6) head-to-head goals scored; 7) draw.
(Q) Qualified for the phase indicated

=== Finals ===
==== Quarterfinals ====
10 May 2021

Walter Ferretti	3–0	Deportivo Ocotal
Rene Huete 68' Dshon Forbes 86' Cristhian Flores 90'		Nil

Referee: Odanel Velez

Walter Ferretti progressed 3-0.

14 May 2021

Managua	1-0	Real Madriz
Lucas dos Santos 49'		Nil

Estadio Nacional de Fútbol (UNAN) (Managua)
Referee: Nitzar Sandoval

Managua progressed 1-0.

==== Semi-finals ====
Team 1	Agg.	Team 2	1st leg	2nd leg
Walter Ferretti	1–3	Diriangén	1–0	0–3
Real Estelí	5–5(a)	Managua	3–1	2–4

13 May 2021

Walter Ferretti	1–0	Diriangén
Fernando Vilalpando 78'		Nil

16 May 2021

Diriangén	3–0	Walter Ferretti
Maycon Santana 45' 60'; Luis Coronel 83'		Nil

Estadio Cacique Diriangén, Diriamba

Diriagen won 3-1 on aggregate.

14 May 2021

Managua	3–1	Real Estelí
Agenor Baez 79'; Lucas dos Santos 82' 86'		Juan Barrera 41'

17 May 2021

Real Estelí	4–2	Managua
Juan Barrera 16' 37'; Carlos Chavarria 54' 56'		Lucas dos Santos 82' 90'

5-5. Managua won 5-5 on aggregate away goal(s).

==== Final ====
Team 1	Agg.	Team 2	1st leg	2nd leg
Diriangén	3 – 1	Managua	2 – 0	1 – 1

23 May 2021

Managua	0 – 2	Diriangén
Nil		Robinson Luiz 65' 69'

Estadio Nacional de Fútbol (UNAN) (Managua)
Referee: Tatiana Guzman

30 May 2021

Diriangén	1 – 1	Managua

Estadio Cacique Diriangén
Referee: Nitzar Sandoval

== List of foreign players in the league ==
This is a list of foreign players in the 2020–21 season. The following players:

1. Have played at least one game for the respective club.
2. Have not been capped for the Nicaragua national football team on any level, independently from the birthplace

A new rule was introduced this season, that clubs can have four foreign players per club and can only add a new player if there is an injury or a player/s is released, and it is before the closing of the season transfer window.

ART Jalapa

- (Brazil) Gabriel Coelho
- (Colombia) Ronaldo Pabon
- (Mexico) Juan Daniel González
- (Mexico) Edder Mondragón (*)
- (Mexico) Eder García
- (Honduras) Brayan Zúñiga (*)
- (Colombia) Yeiner Marcelo Vivas (*)

Chinandega

- (Colombia) Brayan Cañate
- (Colombia) Marlon Barrios
- (Colombia) Duver Quinonez
- (Colombia) Esteban Lozada
- (Honduras) Cristhian Izaguirre

Diriangén

- (Argentina) Jonathan Pacheco
- (Honduras) Marel Álvarez
- (Brazil) Pedro Dos Santos
- (Brazil) Maycon Santana
- (Uruguay) Bernando Laureiro
- (Colombia) Jhon Mosquera

Juventus Managua

- (Brazil) Rafael Vieira
- (Paraguay) Alexander Moreno
- (Honduras) Cristhian Euseda
- (Mexico) Carlos Felix

Managua

- (Brazil) Lucas Dos Santos
- (Venezuela) Edward Morillo
- (Spain) Pablo Gállego
- (Spain) Diego Pelaez
- (Paraguay) Marcos González
- (Honduras) Brayan Castillo
- (Argentina) Leandro Figueroa

Ocotal

- (Honduras) Allan Gutiérrez
- (Colombia) Kenverlen López
- (Colombia) Brayan Cantillo Lucumi
- (Colombia) Jerney Vente

Real Estelí

- (Argentina) Lucio Barroca
- (Argentina) Alvaro Rezzano
- (Argentina) Luis Acuna
- (Brazil) Rodrigo Bronzatti
- (Brazil) Vitor Faiska
- (Equatorial Guinea) Niko Kato
- (Colombia) Jhon Mosquera

Real Madriz

- (Colombia) Jamilton Moreno
- (Colombia) Nicolas Quinonez
- (Colombia) Bryan Mojica
- (Argentina) Jorge Moreno

Junior de Managua

- (Colombia) Carlos Mosquera
- (Mexico) Edson Contreras
- (Mexico) Luis Carbajal
- (Mexico) Rogelio Espinoza

Walter Ferretti

- (Mexico) Taufic Guarch
- (Brazil) Christiano Fernandes de Lima
- (Mexico) Fernando Villalpando
- (Mexico) Sergio Napoles

(player released during the Apertura season) (player released between the Apertura and Clausura seasons) (player released during the Clausura season)
