= FC Esteli =

Nicaraguan football club

FC Estelí
- Full name: Futbol Clube Estelí
- Founded: 2012
- Ground: Facultad Regional Multidisciplinaria; Estelí, Nicaragua
- Manager: Guillermo Espinales
- League: Segunda División de Nicaragua
Home colours	Away colours

Futbol Clube Estelí is a Nicaraguan football team playing in the second division of the Nicaragua football system. It is based in Estelí.

== History ==
Founded in April 2012, FC Estelí immediately won promotion to the Nicaraguan Second Division in 2012.

== Current squad ==
Note: Flags indicate national team as defined under FIFA eligibility rules; some limited exceptions apply. Players may hold more than one non-FIFA nationality.

No.	Pos.	Nation	Player
2	FW	(Nicaragua) NCA	Missael Gámez

== Achievements ==
- Segunda División de Nicaragua: 0
  TBD

== Coaches ==
- TBD
