= Lentini Caciano =

Curaçao footballer (born 2001)

Personal information
- Date of birth: 15 August 2001 (age 25)
- Place of birth: Delfzijl, Netherlands
- Height: 1.84 m (6 ft 0 in)
- Position: Right winger

Team information
- Current team: ACV
- Number: 17

Youth career
- Eems Boys
- –2013: GVAV-Rapiditas
- 2013–2019: PEC Zwolle
- 2019–2023: Emmen

Senior career*
Years	Team	Apps	(Gls)
2020–2023	Emmen	4	(0)
2024–	ACV	21	(3)

International career
2020	Curaçao U20	3	(1)
- * Club domestic league appearances and goals as of 16 May 2026

Lentini Caciano (born 15 August 2001) is a Curaçaoan footballer who plays as a winger for Derde Divisie club ACV Assen.

== Career ==
On 8 May 2024, Tweede Divisie club ACV Assen announced the signing of Caciano ahead of the 2024–25 season.

== Career statistics ==
=== Club ===
As of match played 7 December 2024

Appearances and goals by club, season and competition
Club	Season	League			Cup		Other		Total	
Club	Season	Division	Apps	Goals	Apps	Goals	Apps	Goals	Apps	Goals
Emmen	2020–21	Eredivisie	4	0	2	0	0	0	6	0
ACV	2024–25	Tweede Divisie	6	1	0	0	—		6	1
Career total			10	1	2	0	0	0	12	1
