= Douglas Forvis =

Nicaraguan footballer (born 1992)

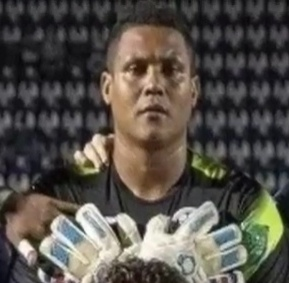
- Forvis in 2022

Personal information
- Full name: Douglas Forvis Espinoza
- Date of birth: 17 May 1992 (age 34)
- Place of birth: Nicoya, Costa Rica
- Height: 1.90 m (6 ft 3 in)
- Position: Goalkeeper

Team information
- Current team: Real Estelí
- Number: 1

Youth career
- Saprissa

Senior career*
Years	Team	Apps	(Gls)
2015–2018	Liberia	63	(0)
2018–2022	Santos de Guápiles	79	(0)
2022–	Real Estelí	38	(0)

International career^{‡}
2021–	Nicaragua	7	(0)
- * Club domestic league appearances and goals as of 12 May 2024 ‡ National team caps and goals as of 27 September 2022

Douglas Forvis Espinoza (born 17 May 1992) is a professional footballer who plays as a goalkeeper for Liga Primera de Nicaragua club Real Estelí. Born in Costa Rica, he plays for the Nicaragua national team.

== Club career ==
As a youth player, Forvis joined the youth academy of Saprissa, Costa Rica's most successful club. After that, he signed for Liberia in the Costa Rican second division, helping them achieve promotion to the Costa Rican top flight.

In 2018, he signed for Costa Rican top flight side Santos (Guápiles).

== International career ==
Born in Costa Rica, Forvis is of Nicaraguan and Jamaican descent through his father and grandmother, respectively. He debuted with the Nicaragua national team in a 2–0 friendly win over Cuba on 14 November 2021.
