= San Lorenzo, Nicaragua =

San Lorenzo
- Municipality
- Location in Nicaragua
- Coordinates: 12°22′N 85°40′W
- Country: Nicaragua
- Department: Boaco Department

Area
  - Municipality: 216.07 sq mi (559.61 km^{2})

Population (2005)
  - Municipality: 23,666
  - Urban: 5,147

San Lorenzo (Spanish pronunciation: [san loˈɾenso]) is a municipality in the Boaco Department of Nicaragua. It has a population of 28,100 (2006, est.) and an extension of 559.61 km^{2}. The economy is based mainly on agricultural and some agropecuarian activities. The capital is the town of San Lorenzo located 91 km from Managua.

Most people in the municipality (70%) lives in rural areas. The mayor of the municipality of San Lorenzo is Leonel Leonidas Sasiga Madrigal from the Constitutionalist Liberal Party (PLC).

== History ==
Back in 1852, Josefa Tellez, owner of a small farm in the vicinity of the area where the town of San Lorenzo is located today, found a religious image of San Lorenzo. From that day the place was known as San Lorenzo de los Tellez in honor to Josefa Tellez.

San Lorenzo was officially granted the title of town on August 23, 1858. With new settlers from Granada Department in 1872, the town became more populated. The municipality of San Lorenzo was part of the Chontales Department until 1935, when it became part of the Boaco Department.

== Local festivities ==
The municipality celebrates its patron San Lorenzo with corridas, popular fiestas and religious activities during the period from August 7 through 10.
