= Diriangén FC =

Association football club in Nicaragua

Diriangén
- Full name: Cacique Diriangén Fútbol club
- Nicknames: Los Caciques (The Chieftains); La Tribu (The Tribe); El Imperio (The Empire); Los Blanquinegros (The Black and Whites)
- Founded: 17 May 1917; 109 years ago
- Ground: Estadio Cacique Diriangén
- Capacity: 7,500
- Chairman: Adrián Espino
- Manager: José Giacone
- League: Liga Primera
- 2024–25: TBD
- Website: diriangenfc.com
| Home colours | Away colours |

Cacique Diriangén Fútbol club is a Nicaraguan professional football club based in Diriamba which competes in Nicaraguan Premier Division (Primera Division). It is one of the oldest clubs in not only Nicaragua but also in Central America.

== History ==
Founded in 1917, Diriangén has won a total of 30 domestic titles, including at least one in every decade since the 1940s. They are also the only club in Nicaragua to have competed in every season of the league's top flight. As a result of this success, the club has become associated with the motto "Diriangén no tuvo infancia, porque nació grande" ("Diriangen never had a childhood because it was born big")'.

Diriangén's strongest era was in the 1940s, when they won six consecutive championships (1940–45). They won a seventh championship in 1949, and hoisted the crown three times in the 1950s (1953, 1956, and 1959). A long drought followed in the 1960s, but the club rebounded in the mid 60s with Roy Zuniga el "Portero Historico" with consecutive titles in 1969–70 and again in 1974.

The 1980s saw a return to the form of glory days past. It opened with a threepeat (1981, 1982, and 1983) and included other championships in 1987 and 1989. The 1990s were similar—a threepeat from 1994–97, followed by a title win in 1999–2000. However, the 2000s didn't go quite as well. Although Diriangén managed to win the championship in 2004–2005 and 2005–2006, the real power in Nicaragua had shifted to Real Esteli, winners of thirteen championships in 16 years.

Meanwhile, Diriangén struggled through a thirteen year title drought. That year was finally broken in Clausura 2018, when they knocked off Real Esteli 3–1 on aggregate.

The club celebrated its 100-year celebration in 2017

== Current squad ==
As of May 31, 2026 Note: Flags indicate national team as defined under FIFA eligibility rules; some limited exceptions apply. Players may hold more than one non-FIFA nationality.

| No. | Pos. | Nation | Player |
|---|---|---|---|
| 1 | GK | NCA | Douglas Forvis |
| 2 | DF | NCA | Anyelo Velasquez |
| 3 | DF | NCA | |
| 4 | DF | NCA | Melvin Hernandez |
| 5 | DF | NCA | Erick Tellez |
| 6 | DF | ARG | German Aguirre |
| 7 | FW | CRC | Jossimar Pemberton |
| 8 | MF | NCA | Jonathan Moncada |
| 9 | FW | NCA | Luis Coronel |
| 10 | MF | ARG | Matias Galvaliz |
| 11 | FW | ARG | Francisco Molina |
| 12 | MF | NCA | Jonathan Zapata |

| No. | Pos. | Nation | Player |
|---|---|---|---|
| 13 | FW | NCA | Andrés Reyes |
| 14 | MF | NCA | Jason Coronel (Captain) |
| 15 | MF | ARG | Alan Schönfeld |
| 19 | MF | NCA | Dylan Pineda |
| 20 | MF | NCA | |
| 21 | DF | NCA | Pablo Rodríguez |
| 22 | MF | NCA | Josué Morales |
| 23 | FW | NCA | Ly Wei |
| 24 | GK | NCA | Ronaldo Ruíz |
| 25 | GK | CRC | Víctor Castro |
| 54 | MF | NCA | Oliver Orozco |

=== Players with dual citizenship ===
- (Nicaragua) (Costa Rica) Douglas Forvis

=== Out on loan ===
Note: Flags indicate national team as defined under FIFA eligibility rules; some limited exceptions apply. Players may hold more than one non-FIFA nationality.

| No. | Pos. | Nation | Player |
|---|---|---|---|
| — | | PAR | Renzo Carballo (at Sporting FC until June 2026) |

=== In ===
Note: Flags indicate national team as defined under FIFA eligibility rules; some limited exceptions apply. Players may hold more than one non-FIFA nationality.

| No. | Pos. | Nation | Player |
|---|---|---|---|
| — | | NCA | Junior Arteaga (returned from loan Sacavhispas) |
| — | | NCA | Waldner Vasquez (loaned from Matagalpa FC) |
| — | | URU | Bruno Gabriel Barja (from Uruguay Montevideo) |
| — | | COL | Lorenzo Orellano (from Municipal Liberia) |

| No. | Pos. | Nation | Player |
|---|---|---|---|
| — | | PAN | Jeremy Emmons (loaned from Veraguas United) |
| — | | CRC | Bayron Murcia (from Guadalupe) |
| — | GK | CRC | Víctor Castro (from Inter de San Carlos) |
| — | | NCA | Harry Rojas (from Guadalupe) |
| — | | PAN | Jaquin Gargonia (loaned from Potros del Este) |

=== Out ===
Note: Flags indicate national team as defined under FIFA eligibility rules; some limited exceptions apply. Players may hold more than one non-FIFA nationality.

| No. | Pos. | Nation | Player |
|---|---|---|---|
| — | MF | NCA | Richard Rodriguez (to TBD) |
| — | DF | NCA | Justin Cano (to TBD) |
| — | FW | CRC | Jossimar Pemberton (TBD) |
| — | GK | NCA | Ronaldo Ruíz (TBD) |
| — | | ARG | German Aguirre (TBD) |

| No. | Pos. | Nation | Player |
|---|---|---|---|
| — | | ARG | Francisco Molina (TBD) |
| — | | NCA | Jonathan Moncada (Comunicaciones) |
| — | | NCA | TBD (TBD) |
| — | | NCA | TBD (TBD) |

== Personnel ==
=== Current technical staff ===
As of December 2025

| Position | Name |
|---|---|
| Manager | (Costa Rica) Alexander Vargas |
| Assistant manager | TBD |
| Reserve team coach | (Nicaragua) Ricardo Arevalo |
| Assistant Reserve team coach | (Nicaragua) Alejandro Munoz |
| Goalkeeper coach | (Nicaragua) Carlos Mendieta |
| General sporting director | (Uruguay) Bernardo Laureiro |
| Fitness coach | (Nicaragua) Francisco Olivares |
| Under 19 coach | (Nicaragua) Marcos Mendez |
| Club doctor | (Nicaragua) Reynaldo Cruz |
| Utility | (Nicaragua) César Tinoco |

=== Management ===
| Position | Staff |
|---|---|
| President | (El Salvador) Diego Jacir |
| Vice President | (Nicaragua) Reynal Mairena |
| Legal Representative | (Nicaragua) |
| Secretary of the Board | (Nicaragua) |
| Treasurer | (Nicaragua) |
| General administrator | (El Salvador) Diego Jacir |

== Honours ==
Diriangén is historically the most successful team in Nicaraguan football, as they have won the most Primera División de Nicaragua with thirty-three (33) and won 3 Copa de Nicaragua.

=== Domestic honours ===
==== League ====
- Primera División de Nicaragua and predecessors
  - Champions (33): 1940, 1941, 1942, 1943, 1944, 1945, 1949, 1953, 1956, 1959, 1969, 1970, 1974, 1981, 1982, 1983, 1987, 1989, 1992, 1994−95, 1995−96, 1996−97, 1999−2000, 2004 Apertura, 2005 Clausura, 2005−06, Clausura 2018, 2021 Clausura, 2021 Apertura, Clausura 2022, 2023 Apertura, Clausura 2024, Apertura 2024

==== Domestic Cups ====
- Copa de Nicaragua and predecessors
  - Champions (5): 1996, 1997, 2020, 2024, 2025

=== International ===
- CONCACAF Cup Winners Cup: 2 appearances

1994 – Quarter-Finals
1997 – Qualifying Stage (Central Zone)

=== Record versus other clubs ===
As of 2013-09-13

The Concacaf opponents below = Official tournament results: (Plus a sampling of other results)

| Opponent | Last Meeting | G | W | D | L | F | A | PTS | +/- |
|---|---|---|---|---|---|---|---|---|---|
| (El Salvador) Águila | CONCACAF 1976 | 2 | 0 | 0 | 2 | 2 | 11 | 0 | -9 |
| (Costa Rica) Alajuelense | CONCACAF 1997 | 2 | 1 | 0 | 1 | 4 | 5 | 3 | -1 |
| (El Salvador) Alianza | CONCACAF 1993 | 2 | 0 | 0 | 2 | 1 | 5 | 0 | -4 |
| (Panama) Árabe Unido | CONCACAF 1998 | 2 | 0 | 1 | 1 | 1 | 2 | 1 | -1 |
| (El Salvador) Atlético Marte | CONCACAF 1970 | 2 | 0 | 0 | 2 | 1 | 8 | 0 | -7 |
| (Belize) Coke Milpross | CONCACAF 1989 | 2 | 0 | 1 | 1 | 1 | 4 | 1 | -3 |
| (Guatemala) Comunicaciones | CL 2022 | 3 | 1 | 0 | 2 | 2 | 15 | 0 | -13 |
| (Panama) Euro Kickers | CONCACAF 1997 | 2 | 1 | 0 | 1 | 6 | 5 | 3 | +1 |
| (El Salvador) FAS | UNCAF 2004 | 2 | 0 | 0 | 2 | 0 | 9 | 0 | -9 |
| (Costa Rica) Herediano | CONCACAF 1994 | 2 | 0 | 0 | 2 | 2 | 9 | 0 | -7 |
| (Belize) La Victoria FC | CONCACAF 1992 | 2 | 0 | 1 | 1 | 1 | 2 | 1 | -1 |
| (Honduras) Marathón | CL 2021 | 2 | 0 | 0 | 2 | 1 | 3 | 0 | -2 |
| (Guatemala) Municipal | CONCACAF 1977 | 2 | 0 | 0 | 2 | 2 | 16 | 0 | -14 |
| (Honduras) Olimpia | UNCAF 2006 | 2 | 0 | 0 | 2 | 1 | 5 | 0 | -4 |
| (Honduras) Real Maya | CONCACAF 1994 | 2 | 0 | 0 | 2 | 0 | 3 | 0 | -3 |
| (Honduras) Real España | CONCACAF 1990 | 2 | 0 | 0 | 2 | 1 | 7 | 0 | -6 |
| (Costa Rica) Deportivo Saprissa | CONCACAF 1998 | 6 | 0 | 0 | 6 | 1 | 29 | 0 | -28 |
| (Guatemala) Suchitepéquez | UNCAF 2006 | 2 | 0 | 0 | 2 | 2 | 4 | 0 | -2 |
| (Panama) Universitario | CL 2018 | 2 | 0 | 0 | 2 | 1 | 7 | 0 | -6 |
| Totals | | | | | | | | | |

== Sponsors ==
=== Jersey sponsors ===
- claro (2001–06)
- Movistar (2007–2015)
- claro (2015–present)
- totto (2014–present)
- U de M (2014–present)
- Alcaldía de Diriamba (2014–present)
- CrediFacil
- Proplasa
- betcris
- Victoria Frost
- Iresa
- Flor de Cana

=== Shirt sponsors ===
- Joma (2003–2022)
- Macron (2022–present; also the shirt manufacturers)

== Club statistics and records ==
José María Bermúdez holds the distinction of scoring the most goals in one match, he notched 9 goals in 1997 match against Xiletepelt.

=== Award winners ===
Top Goalscorer (TBD)

The following players have won the league top Goalscorer while playing for Diriangén :

- (Nicaragua) Manuel Cuadra (-) - 1968
- (Nicaragua) Manuel Cuadra (-) - 1969
- (Nicaragua) Mauricio Cruz (-) - 1983
- (Nicaragua) Mauricio Cruz (-) - 1984
- (Nicaragua) Mauricio Cruz (-) - 1985
- (Nicaragua) Mauricio Cruz (-) - 1987
- (Nicaragua) Livio Bendana (-) - 1990
- (Nicaragua) José Maria Bermúdez (-) - 1997-1998
- (Nicaragua) Sergio Gago (-) - 1998-1999
- (Nicaragua) Lester Gonzalez (-) - 1999-2000
- (Nicaragua) Carlos Novoa (-) - 2002-2003
- (Nicaragua) Emilio Palacios (8) - Apertura 2004
- (Honduras) Herberth Cabrera (15) - 2010-2011
- (Brazil) Maycon Santana (10) - 2021
- (Nicaragua) Luis Coronel (11) - 2024 Clausura

=== Notable players ===
Below are the notable former and current players who have represented Diriangen in Primera Division and international competition since the club's foundation in 1917. To appear in the section below, a player must have played in at least 100 official matches for the club, and or who has been called up by their national team.

- (Nicaragua) Roy Zuniga P.- "Portero Historico"
- (India) Ranvir Singh
- (Nicaragua) Livio Bendaña
- (Nicaragua) Mauricio Cruz
- (Nicaragua) Manuel Cuadra

== Stadium ==
The stadium, Estadio Cacique Diriangén, holds 7,500 people. It is a multi-purpose stadium, and has been the home stadium of the Nicaragua national football team for many years. The stadium has much history: In this stadium the club Diriangén FC won against many teams from Central America.

== List of managers ==
Diriangen has had permanent managers since it first appointed Napolen Parrales Bendaña as coach in 1917. The longest-serving manager was Mauricio Cruz Jiron, who managed Diriangen for fourteen years from 1992 to 2006. Hungarian Eduardo Kosovic was the foreign coach in the club. Mauricio Cruz Jiron is the most successful manager as he led the club to seven primera division titles.

- (Nicaragua) Napolen Parrales Bendaña (1917–TBD)
- (Nicaragua) Miguel Cuadra Gonzalez
- (Nicaragua) Alberto Davila El Tico
- (Nicaragua) Carlos Marin (1940s)
- (Hungary) Eduardo Kosovic (1940s)
- (Honduras) Lurio Martinez (1950s)
- (Hungary) Eduardo Cosovich (1956)
- (Costa Rica) Luis Angel Pipila Umana (1958)
- (Costa Rica) Santiago Bonilla (1950s)
- (Argentina) Santiago Berrini (1960s)
- (Argentina) Omar Muraco
- (Nicaragua) Martin "El Cantante" García
- (Nicaragua) Manuel "Catarro" Cuadra (1969)
- (Nicaragua) Armando Ruiz (1960s)
- (Nicaragua) Omar Jiron Rugamas (1960s)
- (Nicaragua) Roberto Guardia (1960s)
- (Nicaragua) Livio Bendaña Espinoza (1966–72)
- (El Salvador) Oscar Figueroa Cristales Cocoroco (1973)
- (Nicaragua) Pedro Jose Jiron (1970s)
- (Nicaragua) Julio Rocha Ideaquez El negro Julio (1970s)
- (Nicaragua) Armando Mendieta Parrales Miluy (1980s)
- (Nicaragua) Jose Manuel Figuero Chemanel (1980s)
- (Nicaragua) William Parrales Quintanilla (1980s)
- (Nicaragua) Benjamin Parrales (1980s)
- (Nicaragua) Mario Chavez Morales (1980s)
- (Nicaragua) Milton Cuadra Serrano (1990–1991)
- (Nicaragua) Mauricio Cruz Jiron (1991– 2006)
- (Nicaragua) Róger "Pinocho" Rodríguez (Aug 2006–06)
- (Nicaragua) Martín Mena (2007)
- (Nicaragua) Mauricio Cruz Jiron (2008–10)
- (Honduras) Edgardo Soza (2010)
- (Nicaragua) Rolando Méndez (2010–11)
- (Costa Rica) Glen Blanco (July 2011 – October 11)
- (Nicaragua) Martín Mena (October 2011 – February 12)
- (El Salvador) Ángel Eugenio Orellana (February 2012 – June 12)
- (Honduras) Francisco Nuñez (June 2012 – September 12)
- (Nicaragua) Luis Vega (September 2012 – October 12)
- (Argentina) Carlos Alberto de Toro (October 2012 – November 13)
- (Brazil) Flavio Da Silva (November 2013 – May 14)
- (Nicaragua) Florencio Leiva (June 2014 – August 14)
- (Argentina) Roberto Chanampe (August 2014 – July 2015)
- (Argentina) Andrés Novara (July 2015 – October 2015)
- (Colombia) Javier Londoño (October 2015 – January 2016)
- (Spain) Mario Reig (January 2016 – February 2016)
- (El Salvador) Jose Luis Rugamas (February 2016 – August 2016)
- (Nicaragua) Tyron Acevedo (August 2016 – May 2017)
- (Nicaragua) Mauricio Cruz Jiron (May 2017 – September 2019)
- (Brazil) Flavio Da Silva (September 2019 – April 2022)
- (Nicaragua) Tyrone Leiva (April 2022 – June 2022)
- (Argentina) Roberto Chanampe (June 2022 – May 2023)
- (Argentina) José Giacone (June 2023 – September 2024)
- (Nicaragua) Edward Urroz Interim (September 2024 - March 2025)
- (Argentina) José Giacone (April 2025 - December 2025)
- (Costa Rica) Alexander Vargas (December 2025 - present)

=== Notable managers ===
The following managers have won at least one trophy while in charge at Diriangen:

| Name | Nat | Tenure | Honors |
|---|---|---|---|
| Eduardo Cosovich | HUN | 1956 | Primera Division 1956 |
| Manuel "Catarro" Cuadra | NCA | 1969 | Primera Division 1969 |
| Livio Bendaña Espinoza | NCA | 1966-1972 | Primera Division 1970 |
| Mauricio Cruz Jiron | NCA | 1992–2006 | Primera Division 1989, 1992, 1995, 1996, 1997, 2000, 2005, 2006, 2018 Clausura |
| Flavio Da Silva | BRA | 2019–2022 | Copa Primera 2020, 2021 Clausura, 2021 Apertura |
| Tyrone Leiva | NCA | April 2022 – June 2022 | Clausura 2022 |
| José Giacone | ARG | June 2023 – September 2024; April 2025 – December 2025 | Apertura 2023, Clausura 2024, Copa Primera 2024, 2025 Apertura |
| Edward Urroz | NCA | September 2024 – March 2025 | Apertura 2024 |

== Women's team ==
The women's team has won the Nicaraguan women's football championship four times in 2000, 2001, 2003 and lately in 2010.
