= Niquinohomo =

- Municipality
- Location in Nicaragua
- Coordinates: 11°54′N 86°06′W
- Country: Nicaragua
- Department: Masaya

Area
  - Municipality: 12 sq mi (32 km^{2})

Population (2020)
  - Municipality: 16,635
  - Density: 1,300/sq mi (520/km^{2})
  - Urban: 8,550
- Climate: Aw

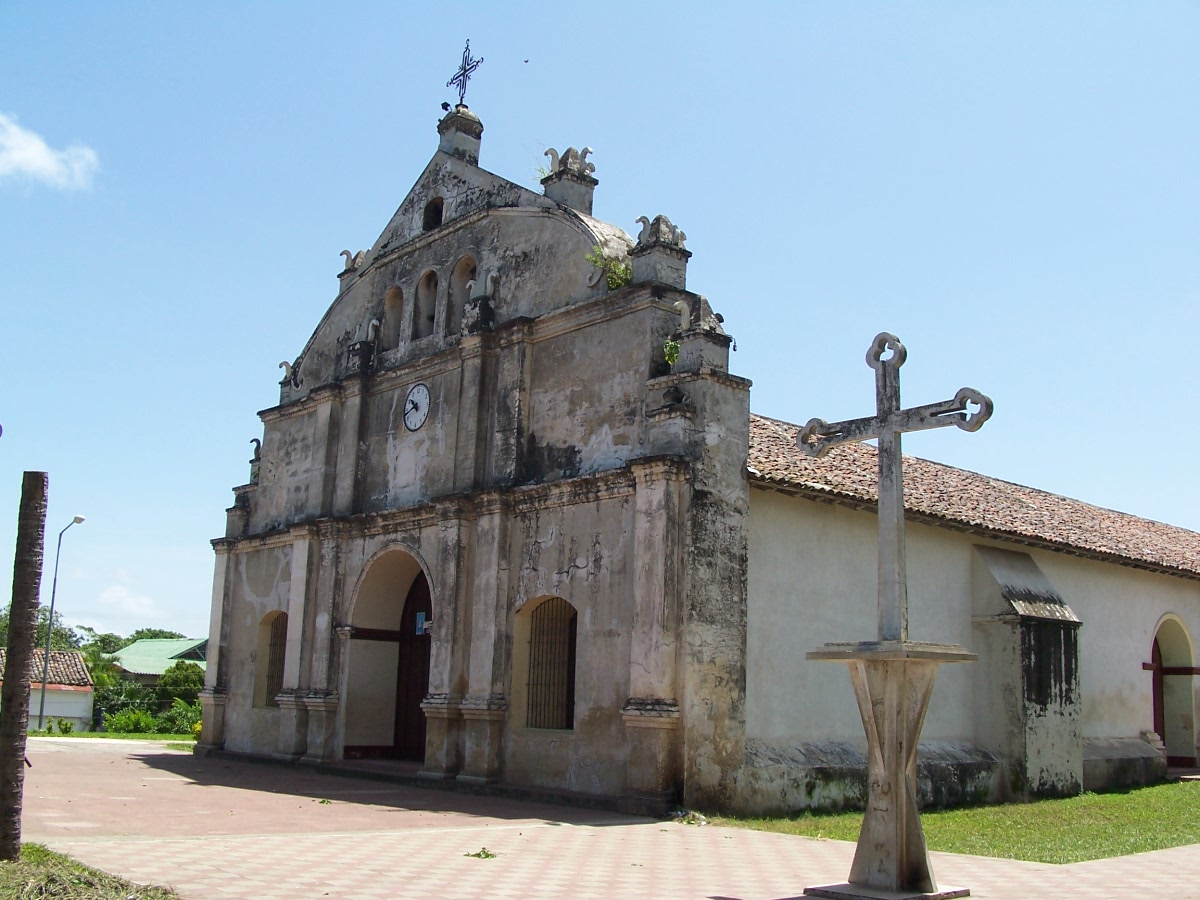
Parish of Saint Anne, Niquinohomo.

Niquinohomo (Spanish pronunciation: [nikinoˈomo]) is a municipality in the Masaya department of Nicaragua. It is home to the oldest extant church in Nicaragua; Church of Saint Ann (Iglesia de Santa Ana). The city's patron saint, as well as the birthplace of Augusto César Sandino, after whom the Sandinista movement was named.
