= Camoapa =

- Municipality
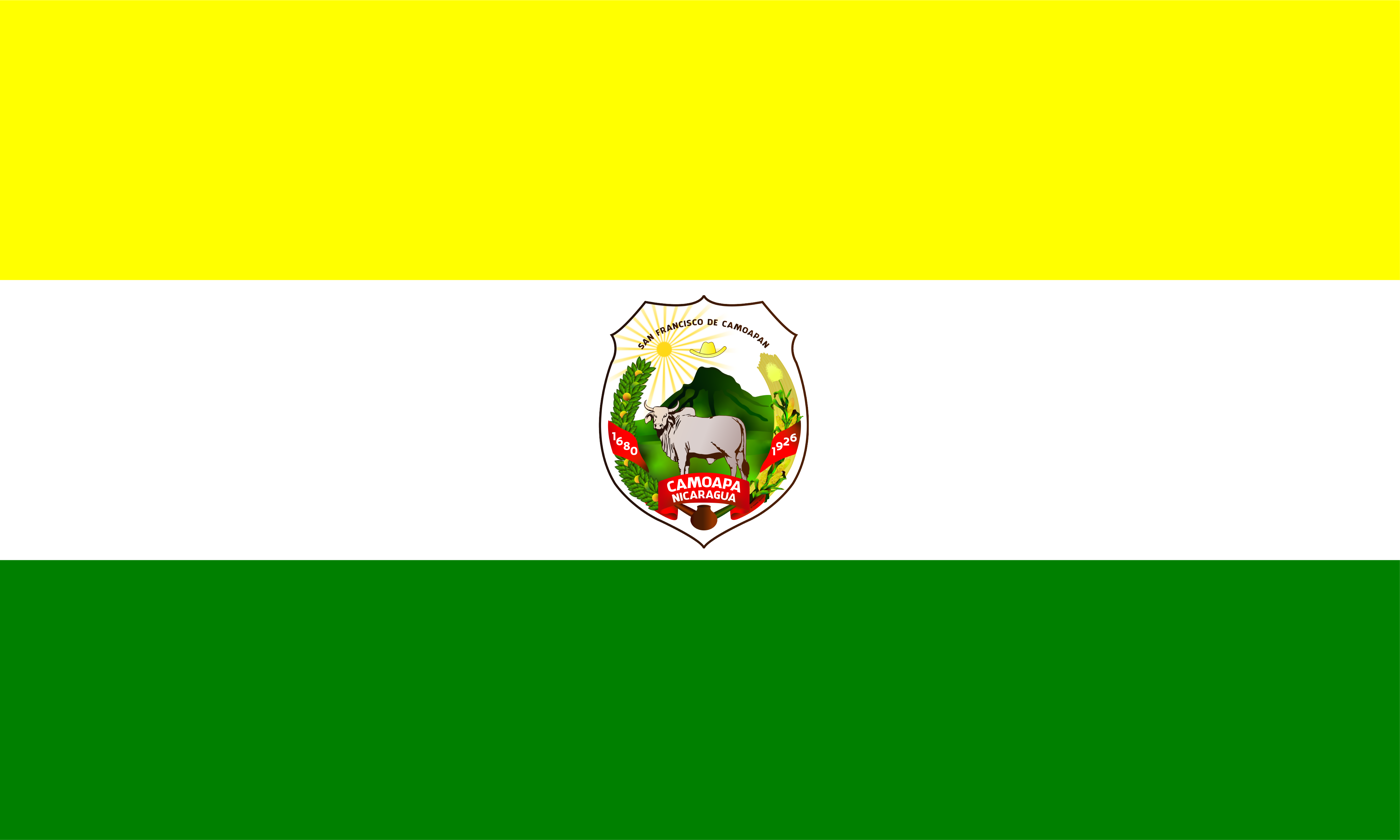
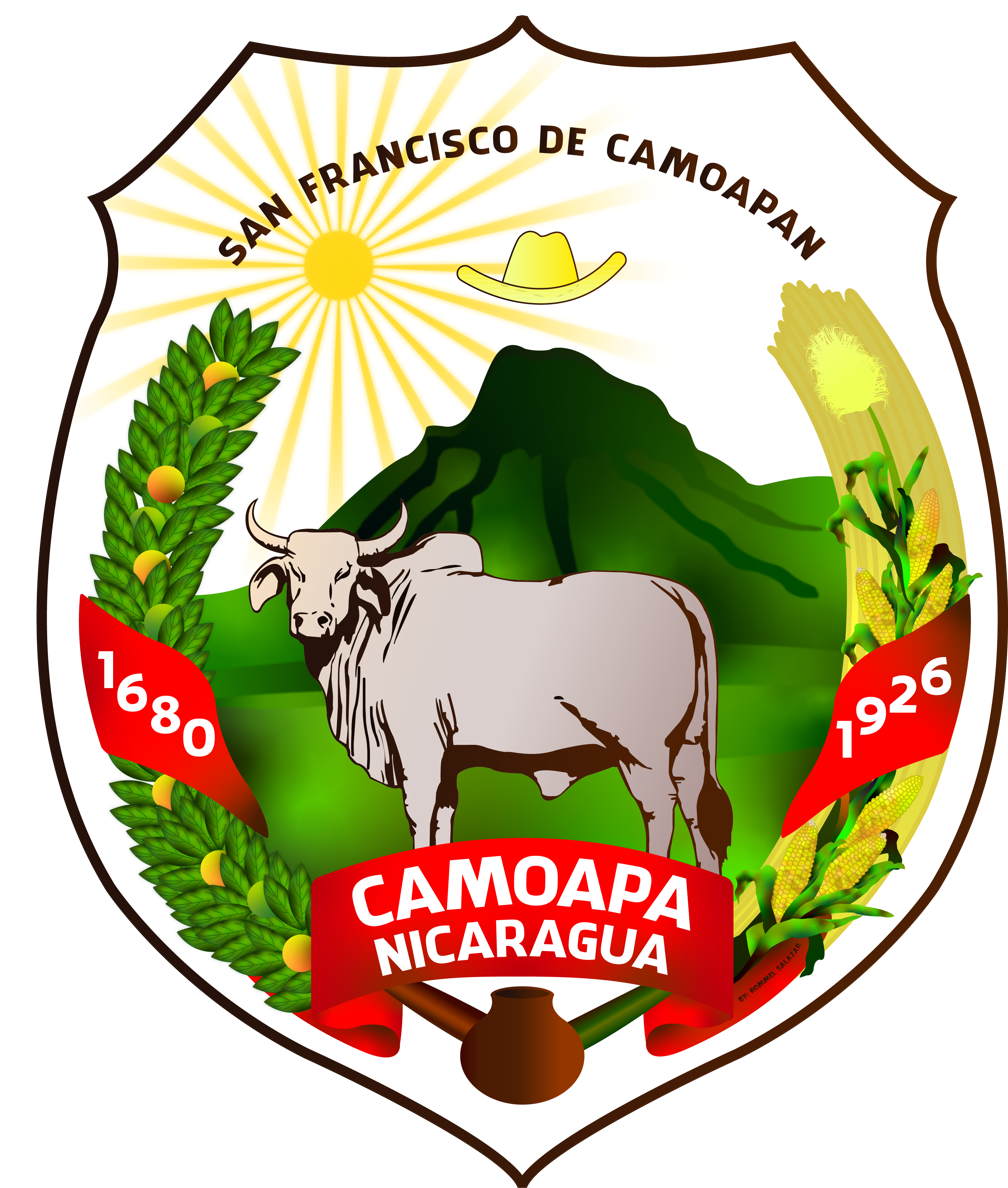
- Flag Coat of arms

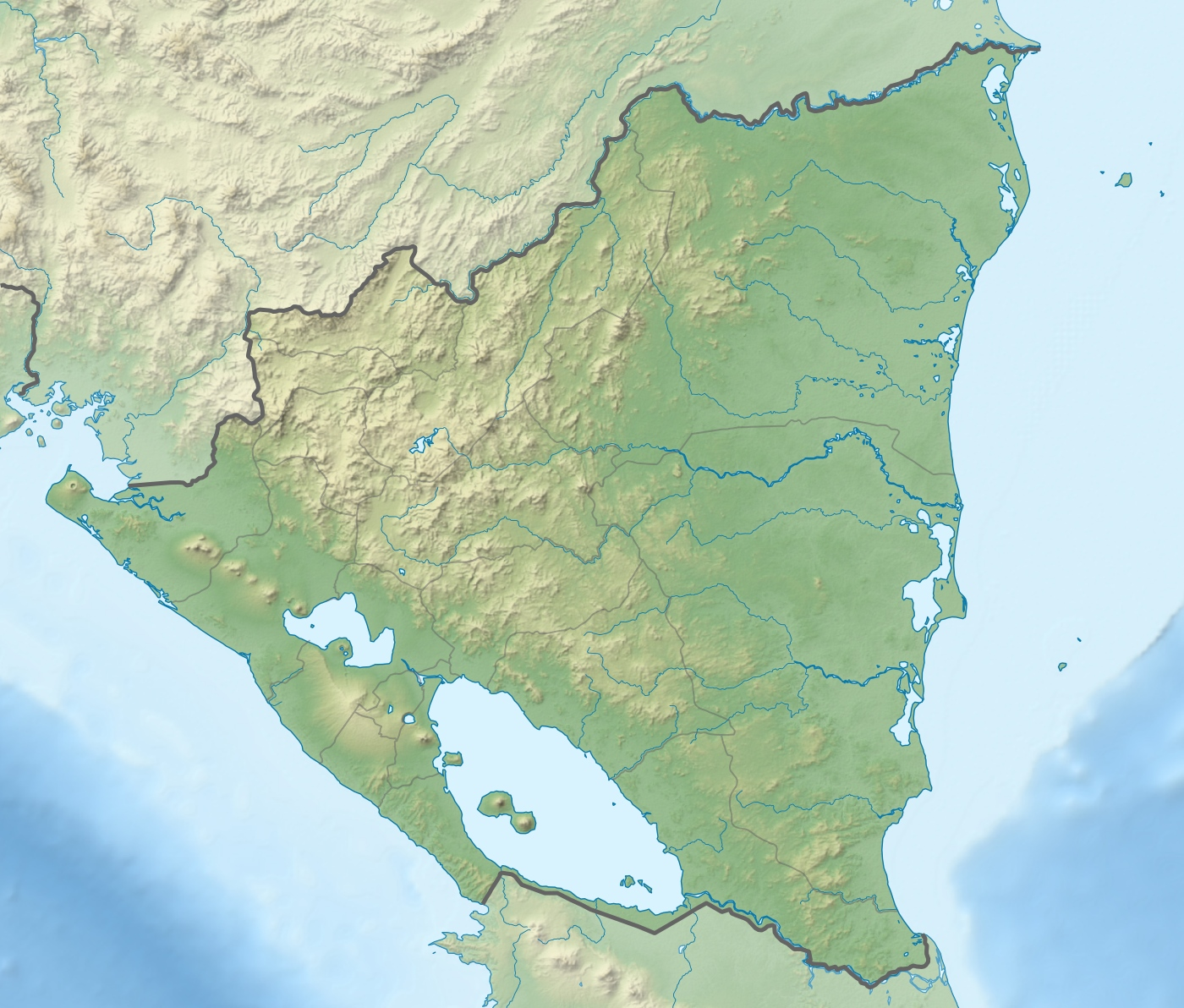
- Location in Nicaragua
- Coordinates: 12°31′N 85°23′W
- Country: Nicaragua
- Department: Boaco Department

Area
  - Municipality: 573 sq mi (1,483 km^{2})

Population (2022 estimate)
  - Municipality: 39,973
  - Density: 69.81/sq mi (26.95/km^{2})
  - Urban: 17,410

Camoapa is a city and a municipality in the Boaco department of Nicaragua.

Camoapa city is the capital of a municipality described within the Boaco departmental area of Nicaragua. Although Camoapa is a small town, (founded on August 23, 1858), on March 2, 1926, (more than eighty years ago), the status of Camoapa was raised to the title of city. Camoapa Municipality has a population of 39,973 (2022 estimate). Its territory extension, an area of 1,483 km² varies slightly and on average is about 540m above sea level. Camoapa is located 114 km. from Managua.

The population of Camoapa is predominantly rural, 56.6% living in rural areas versus 43.4% living in urban areas.

Camoapa is the largest cattle producing region in Nicaragua. The economy of Camoapa is based primarily on agriculture and the cattle industry, (cattle raising, trading and dairy). Other local industries include leather handcrafting and the crafting of "sombreros de pita", hand woven hats.

Religion; The population is mostly Catholic, and the Protestant religion is popular as well. While primarily Christian in practice, religious practices in Camoapa can vary.

== Local holidays and festivities ==
One of the most important festivals is held on June 24 in honor of the Sacred Heart of Jesus. In addition, on October 4, Camoapa celebrates with a big festival to honor the city's patron St. Francis of Assisi. Included among the numerous festivals celebrated during holidays in Camoapa, festivities also include La purisima, (a national holiday), and the National Cattle fair celebrated in April.

Local entertainment includes a bar and nightclub scene where dance halls and discothèques are popular. rodeos which feature bull riding are very popular. Rodeos are very popular as a primary economic activity in Camoapa is Cattle ranching. cock fighting tournaments are popular as well.

== Sister city ==
- Arcata, California
