= Las Sabanas =

- Municipality
- Location in Nicaragua
- Coordinates: 13°21′N 86°37′W
- Country: Nicaragua
- Department: Madriz

Area
  - Municipality: 25 sq mi (65 km^{2})

Population (2005)
  - Municipality: 4,136
  - Density: 160/sq mi (64/km^{2})
  - Urban: 904

Las Sabanas is a municipality in the Madriz department of Nicaragua.
