= Junior de Managua =

Club Deportivo Junior de Managua is an association football club based in Managua, Nicaragua.

== History ==
Junior de Managua was founded in 2015.
