= San José de los Remates =

- Municipality
- Location in Nicaragua
- Coordinates: 12°36′N 85°46′W
- Country: Nicaragua
- Department: Boaco Department

Area
  - Municipality: 108.29 sq mi (280.46 km^{2})

Population (2005)
  - Municipality: 7,650
  - Urban: 1,763

San José de los Remates is a municipality in the Boaco department of Nicaragua.

It has a population of 9,600 (2006, est.) and an extension of 280.46 km². The economy is based mainly on agricultural and agropecuarian activities, including coffee. The capital is the town of San José de Boaco located 97 km. from Managua.

The mayor is Carlos Cajina Loaisiga from Alliance for the Republic (APRE), brother of Fabricio Cajina Loaisiga, former mayor of San José de los Remates and vice-presidential candidate of Nicaraguan Liberal Alliance, currently second in the Nicaraguan general election, 2006 polls.

== Administrative organization ==
The municipality is divided in ten urban and eighteen rural zones:

The ten urban barrios in the town of San José de Boaco, the capital of the municipality are; Pedro Joaquín Chamorro, Costa Rica, El Progreso, El Granero, La Esperanza, Ranchería, Divino Niño, Inmaculada, El Colegio and Catorce de Junio. The estimated population is 8,200 in the urban area.

The rural zones are divided in two sub-zones; zona seca (or dry zone) and zona húmeda (or humid zone). The estimated population is 1,400 in the rural areas.

Zona seca: San Bartolo, Casa Nuevas, La Cañada, Nacascolo, La Majada, Peñasco, Bajo de Tomatoya, El Coyol, El Corozo and Poza de la Piedra.

Zona Húmeda: Los Talmites, Malacatoya, Kumayca Norte, Kumayca Sur, Cerro Alegre, El Roblar, El Cerro and La Laguna.

== History ==
The town San José de Boaco, formerly known as San José de los Remates, was founded on March 18, 1848 by José Guerrero, director of the State of Nicaragua, that ordered all families and neighbours of Teuspeute to establish in the Town of the Remates, that gave the original name of the location, San José de los Remates.

On August 6, 1861, by resolution of General Tomás Martínez, head of the government, the municipality of San José de los Remates was created.

== Local festivities ==
San José de los Remates celebrates every March 19 its patron Saint Joseph (San José) with corridas, a Nicaraguan variant of North American rodeo, parades and popular fiestas. The other big local holiday is on December 11 and 12 in honor of the Virgin of Guadalupe.
