= 2003 UNCAF Nations Cup squads =

Below are the rosters for the UNCAF Nations Cup 2003 tournament in Panama, held from February 9 to 27 2003.

== Guatemala ==
Head coach: (Uruguay) Julio César Cortés

No.	Pos.	Player	Date of birth (age)	Caps	Goals	Club
1	GK	Ricardo Trigueño Foster	17 April 1980 (aged 22)	1	0	(National Football Federation of Guatemala) Aurora
2	DF	Nelson Morales	20 September 1976 (aged 26)	4	0	(National Football Federation of Guatemala) Cobán Imperial
3	DF	Pablo Melgar Torino	4 January 1980 (aged 23)	3	0	(National Football Federation of Guatemala) Antigua
4	MF	Denis Chen	9 August 1977 (aged 25)	16	1	(National Football Federation of Guatemala) Municipal
5	DF	Luis René Vargas	9 January 1979 (aged 24)	2	0	(National Football Federation of Guatemala) Cobán Imperial
6	DF	Álvaro José Jiménez	24 November 1974 (aged 28)	19	0	(National Football Federation of Guatemala) Comunicaciones
7	MF	Fabricio Benítez	11 June 1975 (aged 27)	16	0	(National Football Federation of Guatemala) Cobán Imperial
8	MF	Mario Rodríguez	14 September 1981 (aged 21)	2	0	(National Football Federation of Guatemala) Comunicaciones
9	MF	Mario Acevedo	15 February 1969 (aged 33)	27	3	(National Football Federation of Guatemala) Municipal
10	MF	Freddy García	12 January 1977 (aged 26)	44	15	(United States Soccer Federation) Columbus Crew
11	FW	Guillermo Ramírez	26 March 1978 (aged 24)	36	4	(Mexican Football Federation) Jaguares
12	FW	Carlos Figueroa	14 April 1980 (aged 22)	1	0	(National Football Federation of Guatemala) Municipal
13	DF	Néstor Martínez	13 March 1981 (aged 21)	2	0	(National Football Federation of Guatemala) Comunicaciones
14	MF	Claudio Albizuris	1 July 1981 (aged 21)	9	0	(National Football Federation of Guatemala) Municipal
15	FW	César Alegría	29 October 1977 (aged 25)	7	1	(National Football Federation of Guatemala) Cobán Imperial
16	MF	Horacio González	29 January 1973 (aged 30)	3	0	(National Football Federation of Guatemala) Xelajú
18	MF	Gonzalo Romero	25 March 1975 (aged 27)	8	0	(National Football Federation of Guatemala) Municipal
19	MF	Fredy Thompson	2 June 1982 (aged 20)	11	0	(National Football Federation of Guatemala) Comunicaciones
20	FW	Carlos Ruíz	15 September 1979 (aged 23)	33	12	(United States Soccer Federation) Los Angeles Galaxy

== Honduras ==
Head coach: (Honduras) José de la Paz Herrera

No.	Pos.	Player	Date of birth (age)	Caps	Goals	Club
1	GK	Víctor Coello	10 April 1974 (aged 28)	7	0	(National Autonomous Federation of Football of Honduras) Marathón
3	DF	Maynor Figueroa	2 May 1983 (aged 19)	1	0	(National Autonomous Federation of Football of Honduras) Olimpia
5	DF	Sergio Mendoza	23 May 1981 (aged 21)	4	0	(National Autonomous Federation of Football of Honduras) Real España
6	DF	Arnold Cruz	22 December 1970 (aged 32)	42	2	(Costa Rican Football Federation) Cartaginés
7	FW	David Suazo	5 November 1979 (aged 23)	16	2	(Italian Football Federation) Cagliari
8	DF	Pompilio Valerio Cacho	22 December 1976 (aged 26)	0	0	(National Autonomous Federation of Football of Honduras) Marathón
9	FW	Jairo Martínez	14 May 1978 (aged 24)	16	6	(National Autonomous Federation of Football of Honduras) Motagua
10	MF	Julio César de León	13 September 1979 (aged 23)	34	3	(Italian Football Federation) Reggina
11	FW	Milton Núñez	30 October 1972 (aged 30)	53	23	(Mexican Football Federation) Pachuca
13	MF	Héctor Gutiérrez	8 February 1980 (aged 23)	1	0	(National Autonomous Federation of Football of Honduras) Real España
14	DF	Rony Morales	8 June 1978 (aged 24)	12	1	(National Autonomous Federation of Football of Honduras) Platense
15	FW	Wálter Julián Martínez	28 March 1982 (aged 20)	2	0	(National Autonomous Federation of Football of Honduras) Victoria
16	MF	Emil Martínez	17 September 1982 (aged 20)	3	0	(National Autonomous Federation of Football of Honduras) Marathón
17	MF	Francisco Pavón	28 January 1977 (aged 26)	12	1	(National Autonomous Federation of Football of Honduras) Motagua
18	FW	Saul Martínez	29 January 1976 (aged 27)	12	8	(Chinese Football Association) Shanghai Shenhua
19	MF	Edgar Álvarez	9 January 1980 (aged 23)	8	0	(National Autonomous Federation of Football of Honduras) Platense
20	MF	Amado Guevara	2 May 1976 (aged 26)	70	12	(Costa Rican Football Federation) Saprissa
21	MF	Alex Andino	2 August 1982 (aged 20)	1	0	(National Autonomous Federation of Football of Honduras) Platense
23	MF	Maynor Suazo	10 August 1979 (aged 23)	14	0	(National Autonomous Federation of Football of Honduras) Olimpia
25	GK	Donis Escober	3 February 1980 (aged 23)	1	0	(National Autonomous Federation of Football of Honduras) Olimpia

== Nicaragua ==
Head coach: (Italy) Maurizio Battistini

No.	Pos.	Player	Date of birth (age)	Caps	Goals	Club
1	GK	Danny Téllez	16 August 1974 (aged 28)	4	0	(Nicaraguan Football Federation) Parmalat
2	DF	Hevel Quintanilla	14 November 1977 (aged 25)	0	0	(Nicaraguan Football Federation) Parmalat
3	DF	Ezequiel Jérez Luna	30 April 1971 (aged 31)	13	1	(Nicaraguan Football Federation) Diriangén
4	DF	Mario Gastón	26 December 1974 (aged 28)	8	0	(Nicaraguan Football Federation) Real Estelí
5	DF	Carlos Alonso	25 August 1979 (aged 23)	6	0	(Nicaraguan Football Federation) Real Estelí
6	DF	Silvio Avilés	11 August 1980 (aged 22)	0	0	(Nicaraguan Football Federation) Diriangén
7	MF	Armando Ismael Reyes	29 July 1981 (aged 21)	0	0	(Nicaraguan Football Federation) Deportivo Bluefields
8	MF	David Solórzano	5 November 1980 (aged 22)	9	0	(Nicaraguan Football Federation) Diriangén
9	MF	Emilio Palacios	8 October 1982 (aged 20)	4	1	(Nicaraguan Football Federation) Parmalat
10	FW	Hamilton West	16 October 1977 (aged 25)	12	0	(Nicaraguan Football Federation) Real Estelí
11	FW	José Denis Rocha	28 January 1980 (aged 23)	0	0	(Nicaraguan Football Federation) Parmalat
12	MF	Augusto Andino	18 June 1979 (aged 23)	0	0	(Nicaraguan Football Federation) Real Estelí
13	MF	Jaime Raúl Ruíz	24 August 1981 (aged 21)	1	0	(Nicaraguan Football Federation) Jalapa
14	FW	Rudel Calero	20 October 1982 (aged 20)	4	1	(Nicaraguan Football Federation) Deportivo Bluefields
15	MF	Samuel Olivas	24 October 1974 (aged 28)	3	0	(Nicaraguan Football Federation) Real Estelí
16	MF	Mario Acevedo	12 July 1972 (aged 30)	0	0	(National Football Federation of Guatemala) Antigua
17	FW	Víctor Webster	10 January 1981 (aged 22)	7	1	(Nicaraguan Football Federation) Real Estelí
18	DF	Érick Vallecillo	15 October 1980 (aged 22)	0	0	(Nicaraguan Football Federation) Parmalat
19	MF	Tyron Acevedo	12 July 1978 (aged 24)	6	0	(Nicaraguan Football Federation) Walter Ferretti
20	GK	Sergio Chamorro	25 November 1971 (aged 31)	6	0	(Nicaraguan Football Federation) Real Estelí

== Costa Rica ==
Head coach: (United States) Steve Sampson

No.	Pos.	Player	Date of birth (age)	Caps	Goals	Club
1	GK	Álvaro Mesén	24 December 1972 (aged 30)	18	0	(Costa Rican Football Federation) Alajuelense
2	DF	Jervis Drummond	8 September 1976 (aged 26)	38	1	(Costa Rican Football Federation) Saprissa
3	DF	Luis Marín	10 August 1974 (aged 28)	79	3	(Costa Rican Football Federation) Alajuelense
4	MF	Daniel Vallejos	27 May 1981 (aged 21)	5	0	(Costa Rican Football Federation) Herediano
5	MF	Mauricio Alpízar	30 January 1979 (aged 24)	0	0	(Costa Rican Football Federation) Herediano
6	MF	Alonso Solís	14 October 1978 (aged 24)	1	0	(Costa Rican Football Federation) Saprissa
7	FW	Rolando Fonseca	6 June 1974 (aged 28)	80	38	(Costa Rican Football Federation) Alajuelense
9	FW	Alejandro Alpízar	14 June 1979 (aged 23)	0	0	(Costa Rican Football Federation) Alajuelense
10	MF	Walter Centeno	6 October 1974 (aged 28)	50	7	(Hellenic Football Federation) AEK Athens
11	FW	Andy Herron	3 February 1978 (aged 25)	1	1	(Costa Rican Football Federation) Herediano
12	DF	Leonardo González	21 November 1980 (aged 22)	1	0	(Costa Rican Football Federation) Herediano
14	FW	Erick Scott	21 May 1981 (aged 21)	1	0	(Costa Rican Football Federation) Alajuelense
15	DF	Harold Wallace	7 September 1975 (aged 27)	58	1	(Mexican Football Federation) San Luis
16	MF	Try Bennett	5 August 1975 (aged 27)	1	0	(Costa Rican Football Federation) Herediano
17	MF	Steven Bryce	16 August 1977 (aged 25)	37	5	(Costa Rican Football Federation) Alajuelense
18	GK	Ricardo González Fonseca	6 March 1974 (aged 28)	6	0	(Costa Rican Football Federation) Alajuelense
19	MF	Rodrigo Cordero	4 December 1973 (aged 29)	28	1	(Costa Rican Football Federation) Cartaginés
20	DF	Pablo Chinchilla	21 December 1978 (aged 24)	13	1	(Costa Rican Football Federation) Alajuelense
21	MF	Danny Fonseca	7 November 1979 (aged 23)	0	0	(Costa Rican Football Federation) Cartaginés
22	DF	Carlos Castro Mora	10 September 1978 (aged 24)	27	0	(Costa Rican Football Federation) Alajuelense

== El Salvador ==
Head coach: (El Salvador) Juan Ramón Paredes

No.	Pos.	Player	Date of birth (age)	Caps	Goals	Club
1	GK	Juan José Gómez	11 August 1980 (aged 22)	20	0	(Salvadoran Football Federation) Águila
2	DF	Víctor Fuentes	2 July 1978 (aged 24)	0	0	(Salvadoran Football Federation) Águila
3	DF	Marvin González	17 April 1982 (aged 20)	3	0	(Salvadoran Football Federation) FAS
4	DF	Julio Alexander Castro	15 January 1981 (aged 22)	2	0	(Salvadoran Football Federation) Arcense
5	DF	Víctor Velásquez	12 April 1976 (aged 26)	17	0	(Salvadoran Football Federation) FAS
6	MF	Ramiro Carballo	16 March 1978 (aged 24)	11	0	(Salvadoran Football Federation) Alianza
7	FW	Alexander Campos	8 May 1980 (aged 22)	0	0	(Salvadoran Football Federation) Águila
8	MF	José Alexander Amaya	4 October 1976 (aged 26)	25	0	(Salvadoran Football Federation) Águila
9	FW	Diego Mejía	20 June 1982 (aged 20)	4	0	(Salvadoran Football Federation) Alianza
10	FW	Josué Galdámez	18 December 1982 (aged 20)	10	1	(Salvadoran Football Federation) Municipal Limeño
11	FW	Rudis Corrales	6 November 1979 (aged 23)	11	1	(Salvadoran Football Federation) Municipal Limeño
12	MF	Dennis Alas	10 January 1985 (aged 18)	3	0	(Salvadoran Football Federation) San Salvador
14	MF	Roberto Alexánder Ochoa	10 March 1983 (aged 19)	1	0	(Salvadoran Football Federation) Atlético Balboa
15	FW	Juan Carlos Padilla	28 March 1976 (aged 26)	3	1	(Salvadoran Football Federation) FAS
16	DF	Alexander Escobar	4 April 1984 (aged 18)	1	0	(Salvadoran Football Federation) Isidro Metapán
17	MF	Carlos Menjívar	13 April 1981 (aged 21)	2	0	(Salvadoran Football Federation) FAS
18	MF	Gilberto Murgas	22 January 1981 (aged 22)	6	0	(Salvadoran Football Federation) FAS
19	DF	Alfredo Pacheco	1 December 1982 (aged 20)	2	0	(Salvadoran Football Federation) FAS
20	MF	William Antonio Torres	30 May 1981 (aged 21)	3	0	(Salvadoran Football Federation) San Salvador
22	GK	Luís Castro	19 May 1981 (aged 21)	0	0	(Salvadoran Football Federation) FAS

== Panama ==
Head coach: (Brazil) Carlos Alberto da Luz

No.	Pos.	Player	Date of birth (age)	Caps	Goals	Club
1	GK	Ricardo James	7 May 1966 (aged 36)	28	0	(National Autonomous Federation of Football of Honduras) Platense
2	DF	Clovis Vergara	13 March 1979 (aged 23)	6	0	(Panamanian Football Federation) Chorrillo
3	DF	Joel Solanilla	24 December 1983 (aged 19)	0	0	(Panamanian Football Federation) Plaza Amador
4	DF	José Anthony Torres	27 August 1972 (aged 30)	25	0	(National Autonomous Federation of Football of Honduras) Platense
5	MF	Rubén Tuñón	8 June 1976 (aged 26)	0	0	(Panamanian Football Federation) Alianza
6	MF	Gabriel Gómez	29 May 1984 (aged 18)	0	0	(Colombian Football Federation) Envigado
7	MF	Mario Méndez	5 January 1977 (aged 26)	26	3	(Panamanian Football Federation) Tauro
8	FW	Roberto Brown	15 July 1977 (aged 25)	23	7	(Moldovan Football Federation) Sheriff Tiraspol
9	FW	Julio Dely Valdés	12 March 1967 (aged 35)	25	10	(Royal Spanish Football Federation) Málaga
10	MF	Neftalí Díaz	15 December 1971 (aged 31)	42	7	(Panamanian Football Federation) San Francisco
11	FW	Emmanuel Ceballos	13 April 1981 (aged 21)	0	0	(Panamanian Football Federation) Árabe Unido
13	DF	Gilberto Walter	22 June 1977 (aged 25)	9	0	(Panamanian Football Federation) San Francisco
14	MF	Juan Ramón Solís	14 June 1984 (aged 18)	0	0	(Panamanian Football Federation) San Francisco
15	MF	Rodrigo Tello	13 August 1983 (aged 19)	0	0	(Panamanian Football Federation) Árabe Unido
16	MF	Víctor René Mendieta	6 September 1982 (aged 20)	0	0	(Panamanian Football Federation) Alianza
17	FW	Anel Canales	15 March 1978 (aged 24)	0	0	(Panamanian Football Federation) Chorrillo
18	DF	Gary Ramos	7 November 1978 (aged 24)	0	0	(Panamanian Football Federation) Tauro
19	DF	José Justavino	12 February 1981 (aged 21)	0	0	(Panamanian Football Federation) Plaza Amador
20	DF	Juan Carlos Cubillas	20 October 1971 (aged 31)	41	2	(Panamanian Football Federation) Tauro
25	GK	Giovanni Gutiérrez	31 March 1979 (aged 23)	0	0	(Panamanian Football Federation) Alianza
