= 2001 UNCAF Nations Cup squads =

Below are the rosters for the UNCAF Nations Cup 2001 tournament in Honduras, from May 23 to June 3, 2001.

== Group A ==
=== El Salvador ===
Head coach: (El Salvador) Carlos Humberto Recinos

No.	Pos.	Player	Date of birth (age)	Caps	Club
13	GK	Juan José Gómez	11 August 1980 (aged 20)		(El Salvador) Águila
1	GK	Miguel Montes	12 February 1980 (aged 21)		(El Salvador) ADET
2	DF	William Osorio	13 April 1971 (aged 29)		(El Salvador) FAS
17	DF	Jorge Rodríguez	20 May 1971 (aged 29)		(United States) Dallas Burn
6	DF	Jaime Vladimir Cubías	10 March 1974 (aged 27)		(El Salvador) Luis Ángel Firpo
5	DF	Víctor Velásquez	12 April 1976 (aged 24)		(El Salvador) Dragón
19	DF	Elmer Martínez	3 January 1975 (aged 26)		(El Salvador) Municipal Limeño
4	DF	Marvin Benítez	14 August 1974 (aged 26)		(El Salvador) Municipal Limeño
12	DF	Deris Umanzor	7 January 1980 (aged 21)		(El Salvador) Municipal Limeño
20	MF	Guillermo García	4 August 1969 (aged 31)		(El Salvador) Luis Ángel Firpo
10	MF	Rafael Barrientos	12 May 1979 (aged 21)		(El Salvador) Luis Ángel Firpo
15	MF	Héctor Aaron Canjura	15 July 1976 (aged 24)		(El Salvador) Luis Ángel Firpo
3	DF	René Galan	16 October 1975 (aged 25)		(El Salvador) Municipal Limeño
14	FW	Rudis Corrales	6 November 1979 (aged 21)		(El Salvador) Municipal Limeño
8	FW	Santos Cabrera	1 November 1976 (aged 24)		(El Salvador) Luis Ángel Firpo
18	FW	Fredy González Vílchez	2 August 1977 (aged 23)		(El Salvador) Luis Ángel Firpo
7	FW	Josué Galdámez	18 December 1982 (aged 18)		(El Salvador) Municipal Limeño
9	FW	Diego Mejía	20 June 1982 (aged 18)		(El Salvador) Alianza
11	FW	Francisco Ramírez	3 August 1977 (aged 23)		(El Salvador) FAS

=== Honduras ===
Head coach: (Honduras) Ramón Maradiaga

No.	Pos.	Player	Date of birth (age)	Caps	Club
1	GK	Junior Morales	4 March 1978 (aged 23)		(Honduras) Real España
2	DF	Iván Guerrero	30 November 1977 (aged 23)		(England) Coventry City
3	DF	Rony Morales	8 June 1978 (aged 22)		(Honduras) Platense
4	DF	Júnior Izaguirre	12 August 1979 (aged 21)		(Honduras) Motagua
5	DF	José Luis López	13 March 1973 (aged 28)		(Honduras) Real España
6	DF	Mauricio Sabillon	11 November 1978 (aged 22)		(Honduras) Marathón
7	FW	Marlon Hernández	25 June 1972 (aged 28)		(Honduras) Olimpia
8	DF	Jaime Rosales	8 June 1978 (aged 22)		(Honduras) Motagua
9	FW	Carlos Pavón	9 October 1973 (aged 27)		(Mexico) Monarcas Morelia
10	MF	Edgar Álvarez	18 January 1980 (aged 21)		(Honduras) Platense
11	FW	Milton Núñez	30 November 1972 (aged 28)		(England) Sunderland
12	GK	Hugo Caballero	14 November 1974 (aged 26)		(Honduras) Motagua
15	MF	Ricky García	27 July 1971 (aged 29)		(Honduras) Victoria
16	MF	Marco Antonio Mejía	26 March 1975 (aged 25)		(Honduras) Platense
17	FW	Narciso Fernández	5 November 1978 (aged 22)		(Honduras) Marathón
18	FW	Jairo Martínez	14 May 1979 (aged 21)		(England) Coventry City
19	DF	Danilo Turcios	8 May 1978 (aged 22)		(Honduras) Motagua
20	MF	Amado Guevara	2 May 1976 (aged 24)		(Mexico) Toros Neza
22	FW	Juan Manuel Cárcamo	22 May 1974 (aged 26)		(Austria) SV Wüstenrot Salzburg
14	MF	Julio César de León	13 September 1979 (aged 21)		(Honduras) Olimpia
21	DF	Héctor Gutierrez	8 February 1980 (aged 21)		(Honduras) Real España

=== Nicaragua ===
Head coach: (Nicaragua) Mauricio Cruz

No.	Pos.	Player	Date of birth (age)	Caps	Club
20	GK	Carlos Mendieta	3 November 1979 (aged 21)		(Nicaragua) Diriangén
1	GK	Ricardo Sujo	29 March 1977 (aged 23)		(Nicaragua) Parmalat
2	DF	Carlos Alonso	25 August 1979 (aged 21)		(Nicaragua) Parmalat
3	DF	David Solórzano	5 November 1980 (aged 20)		(Nicaragua) Parmalat
14	DF	Elvis Balladares	15 November 1979 (aged 21)		(Nicaragua) Walter Ferretti
15	DF	Jesús Solórzano	7 August 1981 (aged 19)		(Nicaragua) Diriangén
4	DF	Jaime Ruíz	4 August 1981 (aged 19)		(Nicaragua) Deportivo Jalapa
7	MF	José Maria Bermúdez	15 August 1975 (aged 25)		(Nicaragua) Diriángen
13	MF	Mario Morales	24 August 1981 (aged 19)		(Nicaragua) Real Madriz
8	MF	Emilio Palacios	8 October 1982 (aged 18)		(Nicaragua) Diriangén
5	MF	Sergio Molina	19 October 1977 (aged 23)		(Nicaragua) Diriangén
6	DF	Clarence Martínez	22 August 1979 (aged 21)		(Nicaragua) Walter Ferretti
9	MF	Hamilton West	16 October 1977 (aged 23)		(Costa Rica) Guanacasteca
18	MF	Samuel Wilson	4 April 1983 (aged 17)		(Nicaragua) Chinandega
16	MF	Ramon Castellón	29 July 1982 (aged 18)		(Nicaragua) Chinandega
10	FW	Rudel Calero	20 December 1982 (aged 18)		(Nicaragua) Deportivo Bluefields
12	FW	Wilber Sánchez	20 October 1979 (aged 21)		(Nicaragua) Barrio Cuba Inter
11	FW	Víctor Webster	10 January 1981 (aged 20)		(Costa Rica) Limonense

=== Panama ===
Head coach: (Romania) Mihai Stoichiţă

No.	Pos.	Player	Date of birth (age)	Caps	Club
1	GK	Ricardo James	7 May 1966 (aged 34)		(Honduras) Platense
25	GK	Donaldo González	27 November 1971 (aged 29)		(Honduras) Olimpia
2	DF	Clovis Vergara	13 March 1979 (aged 22)		(Panama) Sporting '89
17	DF	Mario Méndez	5 January 1977 (aged 24)		(Panama) Tauro
15	DF	Gilberto Walter	22 June 1977 (aged 23)		(Panama) Panamá Viejo
18	DF	Ubaldo Guardia	8 June 1977 (aged 23)		(Panama) Tauro
5	DF	Felipe Baloy	24 February 1981 (aged 20)		(Colombia) Envigado
14	DF	Roberto Correa	13 March 1979 (aged 22)		(Panama) Plaza Amador
4	DF	José Anthony Torres	27 August 1972 (aged 28)		(Honduras) Platense
20	MF	Juan Carlos Cubillas	20 October 1971 (aged 29)		(Panama) Tauro
6	MF	Ángel Luis Rodríguez	15 February 1976 (aged 25)		(Panama) Tauro
8	MF	Alberto Blanco	8 January 1978 (aged 23)		(Panama) San Francisco
13	FW	Blas Pérez	13 March 1981 (aged 20)		(Panama) Árabe Unido
	FW	Luis Parra	19 April 1971 (aged 29)		(Panama) Tauro
11	FW	Neftalí Díaz	15 December 1971 (aged 29)		(Panama) Atlético Nacional
10	FW	Roberto Brown	15 July 1977 (aged 23)		(Panama) Sporting '89
	FW	Anel Canales	15 March 1978 (aged 23)		(Panama) Panamá Viejo
9	FW	Julio Dely Valdés	12 March 1967 (aged 34)		(Spain) Málaga
7	FW	Jorge Dely Valdés	12 March 1967 (aged 34)		(Japan) Omiya Ardija

== Group B ==
=== Belize ===
Head coach: (Costa Rica) Leroy Sherrier Lewis

No.	Pos.	Player	Date of birth (age)	Caps	Club
1	GK	Shane Moody-Orio	7 August 1980 (aged 20)		(Belize) Kulture Yabra
2	DF	Nelson Moss	27 January 1969 (aged 32)		(Belize) Griga United
3	DF	Vallan Symms	20 March 1980 (aged 21)		(Belize) Acros Bombers SC
4	DF	Orlando Lyons	25 September 1983 (aged 17)		(Belize) Acros Bombers SC
5	DF	René Rodríguez	17 June 1975 (aged 25)		(Belize) Sagitun FC
6	DF	Aaron Nolberto	24 October 1981 (aged 19)		(Belize) Griga United
7	MF	Mark Leslie	20 August 1978 (aged 22)		(Belize) Kulture Yabra
8	DF	Wílmer García	5 March 1977 (aged 24)		(Belize) Sagitun FC
9	FW	Norman Nuñez	12 June 1971 (aged 29)		(Belize) Kulture Yabra
10	MF	Raul Celiz	30 August 1977 (aged 23)		(Belize) Sagitun
11	DF	Jermaine Zúñiga	1 September 1979 (aged 21)		(Belize) Acros Bombers SC
12	FW	Dion Frazer	17 September 1981 (aged 19)		(Belize) Belmopan Bandits
13	MF	Merlin Teck	8 August 1983 (aged 17)		(Belize) Metro Stars
14	DF	Edmund Thomas	19 November 1980 (aged 20)		(Belize) Juventus FC
15	DF	Orlando Reid	14 June 1975 (aged 25)		(Belize) Metro Stars
16	FW	Sylvain Lyons			(Belize) Acros Bombers SC
17	DF	Kevin Pelayo	30 March 1981 (aged 19)		(Belize) Metro Stars
18	GK	Charlie Slusher	28 November 1971 (aged 29)		(Belize) Kulture Yabra
19	MF	Edon Rowley	12 May 1982 (aged 18)		(Belize) Kulture Yabra
20	GK	Giovanni Rodríguez			(Belize) Metro Stars

=== Costa Rica ===
Head coach: (Brazil) Alexandre Guimarães

No.	Pos.	Player	Date of birth (age)	Caps	Club
1	GK	Erick Lonnis	9 September 1965 (aged 35)		(Costa Rica) Saprissa
2	DF	Pablo Chinchilla	21 December 1978 (aged 22)		(Costa Rica) Alajuelense
3	DF	Luis Marín	10 August 1974 (aged 26)		(Costa Rica) Alajuelense
4	DF	Alexander Madrigal	6 May 1972 (aged 28)		(Mexico) La Piedad
5	MF	Cristian Oviedo	25 August 1978 (aged 22)		(Costa Rica) Herediano
6	DF	Robert Arias	18 March 1980 (aged 21)		(Costa Rica) Herediano
7	FW	Rolando Fonseca	6 June 1974 (aged 26)		(Costa Rica) Saprissa
8	MF	Mauricio Solís	13 December 1972 (aged 28)		(Costa Rica) Alajuelense
9	FW	Mínor Díaz	26 December 1980 (aged 20)		(Costa Rica) Herediano
10	FW	Jafet Soto	11 April 1976 (aged 24)		(Mexico) Tecos UAG
12	DF	Alexander Castro	1 January 1979 (aged 22)		(Costa Rica) Alajuelense
13	MF	Andrés Núñez	27 July 1976 (aged 24)		(Costa Rica) Cartaginés
14	FW	Luís Martínez	23 February 1976 (aged 25)		(Costa Rica) San Carlos
15	MF	Walter Centeno	6 October 1974 (aged 26)		(Costa Rica) Saprissa
16	MF	José Brenes Mena	18 March 1979 (aged 22)		(Costa Rica) Cartaginés
17	DF	Austin Berry	5 April 1971 (aged 29)		(Costa Rica) Herediano
18	GK	Lester Morgan	2 May 1976 (aged 24)		(Costa Rica) Herediano
20	FW	William Sunsing	12 May 1977 (aged 23)		(United States) New England Revolution
21	MF	Wilbert Castro	1 February 1979 (aged 22)		(Costa Rica) San Carlos
23	GK	Ricardo González	6 March 1974 (aged 27)		(Costa Rica) Alajuelense

=== Guatemala ===
Head coach: (Uruguay) Julio César Cortes

No.	Pos.	Player	Date of birth (age)	Caps	Club
1	GK	Danny Ortiz	26 July 1976 (aged 24)		(Guatemala) Deportivo Carchá
2	DF	Denis Chen	9 August 1977 (aged 23)		(Guatemala) Cobán Imperial
3	DF	Erick Miranda	17 December 1971 (aged 29)		(Guatemala) Comunicaciones
4	DF	Luis Swisher	21 June 1978 (aged 22)		(Guatemala) Aurora
5	DF	Gustavo Cabrera	13 December 1979 (aged 21)		(Guatemala) Comunicaciones
6	MF	Alvaro Jiménez	24 November 1974 (aged 26)		(Guatemala) Comunicaciones
7	MF	Claudio Albizuris	1 July 1981 (aged 19)		(Guatemala) Municipal
8	MF	Claudio Rojas	29 November 1973 (aged 27)		(Guatemala) Comunicaciones
9	FW	Mario Acevedo	15 February 1969 (aged 32)		(Guatemala) Municipal
10	FW	Freddy García	12 January 1977 (aged 24)		(Guatemala) Comunicaciones
11	MF	Élmer Ponciano	28 June 1978 (aged 22)		(Guatemala) Antigua
12	MF	Daniel Pedroza	18 December 1975 (aged 25)		(Guatemala) Azucareros Cotzumalguapa
13	MF	Eduardo Cocherari	23 January 1980 (aged 21)		(El Salvador) Alianza
14	MF	César Trujillo	20 May 1973 (aged 27)		(Guatemala) Xelajú
16	DF	Israel Donis	11 August 1975 (aged 25)		(Guatemala) Municipal
17	FW	Dwight Pezzarossi	4 September 1979 (aged 21)		(Chile) Palestino
18	FW	Walter Estrada	19 January 1977 (aged 24)		(Guatemala) Municipal
19	DF	Uwaldo Pérez	25 October 1979 (aged 21)		(Guatemala) Municipal
20	GK	Walter Hurtarte	17 July 1969 (aged 31)		(Guatemala) Municipal
