= List of Liga Primera records =

The following is a compilation of notable records and statistics for teams and players in and seasons of Primera División de Nicaragua.

== All time League Records ==
=== Titles ===
- Most top-flight League titles: 33, Diriangén FC
- Most consecutive League titles: 8, Real Esteli F.C.

=== Top flight appearances ===
- Most Appearances: 80, (1933−)
  - Diriangén FC

=== Goals ===
==== Individual ====
- All-time leading goalscorer: Manuel "Catarrito" Cuadra (742 goals)

==== Team ====
- Most league goals scored in a season: 88,
- Fewest league goals scored in a season:
- Most league goals conceded in a season:
- Fewest league goals conceded in a season:, ()
- Biggest Win:

== Records 1933−1994 ==
- Most league goals scored in a season (excluding playoffs): goals, TBD (TBD)
- Fewest league goals scored in a season:TBD (TBD-TBD)
- Most league goals conceded in a season:TBD (TBD-TBD)
- Fewest league goals conceded in a season: 6, TBD (TBD)
- Most goals scored in one season: 44 goals, Oscar "Chiqui" Calvo playing for Flor de Caña in 1967.
- Most goals scored in one game by a player: 6, Manuel “Catarrito” Cuadra vs Corinto
- Biggest Win: UCA 15-1 Esteli, August 6, 1972, and UCA 15-1 Corinto, November 9, 1980
- Record away win:
- Highest scoring game: UCA 15-1 Esteli, August 6, 1972, and UCA 15-1 Corinto, November 9, 1980, and UCA 13-3 ISA, November 23, 1980
- Most wins in a row:
- Most championships won by a player:
- Most Championship by a coach:
- Longest Period of time by a coach (in the first division):
- Most consecutive championship: 5, Diriangén FC (1940, 1941, 1942, 1943, 1944, 1945,)
- Most seasons appearance: 80, Diriangén FC (1933–present)
- Most participants from one place:
- Most points in a season: points, TBD (TBD)
- Fewest points in a season: points, TBD (TBD)
- Most goals scored in a finals game:
- Most goals scored in a final game:
- Highest scoring game in a finals game:
- Most appearances (team) in the finals:
- Most defeats in a final series:
- Most defeats in a final:
- Most appearances in a final series without winning a championship:
- Lowest ranked winners:
- Lowest ranked finalists:
- Biggest win (aggregate):
- Most final series goals by an individual:
- Most goals by a losing side in a final games:
- Lowest finish by the previous season's champions:
- TBD that have won a championship in the season following their promotion to the Primera. They did so in

== Records Short format / Clausura and Apertura 1995−present ==
- Most league goals scored in a season (excluding playoffs):
- Fewest league goals scored in a season:
- Most league goals conceded in a season:
- Fewest league goals conceded in a season:
- Biggest Win: Diriangén FC 14-0 Pinares, February 2, 1997
- Record away win:
- Highest scoring game: Real Estelí F.C. 13-2 Chinandega FC, December 23, 2001
- Most wins in a row:
- Best undefeated streak:
- Most consecutive minutes without conceding a goal : 741 minutes, Denis Espinoza (Nicaragua, Deportivo Walter Ferretti, 2014 Apertura).
- Most championships won by a player:
- Most Championship by a coach: 6 by Ramón Otoniel Olivas with Real Esteli F.C.
- Longest Period of time by a coach at one club: 11 years by Mauricio Cruz Jiron with Diriangén FC (1998–2006), (2008–2010)
- Most consecutive championship won under the Clausura/ Apertua Format: 7 (), Real Esteli F.C.
- Most seasons in an Apertura/Clausura format:
- Fewest appearances in an Apertura/Clausura format:
- Most participants from one place:
- Most points in a season: points, TBD (TBA)
- Fewest points in a season: points
- Most goals scored in a finals game:
- Most goal scored in a final game:
- Most goals scored by one player in a game: 9, José María Bermúdez in 1999
- Most goals scored in a season: 36, Ricardo Vega in Real Esteli F.C. 2008–2009
- Highest scoring game in a finals game: 7, Real Esteli F.C. 6-1 Managua F.C., April 26, 2014
- Most appearances (team) in the finals:
- Most defeats in a final series:
- Most defeats in a final:
- Most appearances in a final series without winning a championship:
- Lowest ranked winners:
- Lowest ranked finalists:
- Biggest win (aggregate):
- Most final series goals by an individual:
- Most goals by a losing side in a final games:
- TBD is the only team that have won a championship in the season following their promotion to the Primera. They did so in
- Lowest finish by the previous season's champions:

== Goalscorers Record ==
=== Top goal scorers in the Apertura/Clausura Format ===
#	Name	Country	Clubs	Career	Goals
1	Rudel Calero	(Nicaragua)	Deportivo Bluefields, America Managua, Real Esteli F.C.	2000−2017	163
2	Emilio Palacios	(Nicaragua)	Diriangén FC, Deportivo Walter Ferretti, Real Esteli F.C., Xilotepelt, UNAN Managua	2000−2016	133
3	Ricardo Vega	(Nicaragua)	Masatepe FC, Real Esteli F.C., Deportivo Walter Ferretti, Chinandega FC, Deportivo Ocotal, Juventus Managua	2006−2019	144
TBD	Luis Manuel Galeano	(Nicaragua)	ART Municipal Jalapa, Real Estelí F.C., HYH Sebaco	TBD	128
TBD	Lucas Dos Santos	(Brazil)	Managua F.C.	TBD	121
7	Samuel Wilson	(Nicaragua)	Real Esteli F.C., UNAN Managua, Deportivo Walter Ferretti, Juventus Managua	2005−2020	126
4	Elmer Mejia	(Honduras) (Nicaragua)	Real Esteli F.C., Juventus Managua	2004−2018	124
5	Miguel Ángel Sánchez	(Nicaragua)	Diriangén FC, Real Madriz	2000−2012	114
6	Wilber Sanchez	(Nicaragua)	America Managua, Parlamat, Deportivo Walter Ferretti, Real Esteli F.C.	2002−2014	113
TBD	Milton Bustos	(Nicaragua)	América Managua, Juventus Managua	TBD	81
8	César Salandia	(Nicaragua) (Honduras)	Deportivo Masatepe, FC San Marcos, Deportivo Walter Ferretti, Diriangén FC, Deportivo Ocotal, Juventus Managua	TBD	85
9	Raul Leguias	(Nicaragua) (Panama)	America Managua, Deportivo Masatepe, Real Estelí F.C., Managua F.C., Diriangén FC, Deportivo Walter Ferretti	2005−	76
9	Darwin Ramirez “El Venado”	(Nicaragua) (Honduras)	VCP Chinandega, Diriangén FC, Deportivo Walter Ferretti, Juventus Managua	TBD	88
10	Herbert Cabrera	(Honduras)	Diriangén FC, Managua F.C., UNAN Managua	2008−2013	69
TBD	Luis Valladares	(Honduras)	Deportivo Walter Ferretti, Real Madriz	TBD	84
TBD	Edward Morillo	(Venezuela)	Managua F.C.	TBD	66
TBD	Daniel Reyes	(Nicaragua)	UNAN Managua	TBD	66
TBD	José Bernardo Laureiro	(Uruguay)	Diriangén FC, Deportivo Walter Ferretti	TBD	66
TBD	Marcos Méndez	(Nicaragua)	Managua F.C.	TBD	63
TBD	Erick Sierra	(Honduras)	Deportivo Ocotal, Managua F.C.	TBD	50
TBD	Daniel Cadena	(Nicaragua) (Spain)	Deportivo Walter Ferretti	TBD	48
TBD	Juan Barrera	(Nicaragua)	Deportivo Walter Ferretti, Real Estelí F.C.	2005−	45
TBD	José Alejandro Mejía	(Honduras)	TBD	TBD	45
TBD	Victor Carrasco	(Honduras)	América Managua, Masatepe, FC San Marcos, Xilotepelt, Deportivo Walter Ferretti, Juventus Managua	TBD	43
TBD	Mario Morales	(Nicaragua)	Deportivo Ocotal	TBD	43
TBD	Salvador Garcia	(Nicaragua)	Real Esteli F.C.	TBD	41
TBD	Norfran Lazo	(Nicaragua)	Diriangén FC, Managua F.C., Deportivo Walter Ferretti, Real Esteli F.C.	TBD	40
TBD	Ronny Colon	(Honduras)	América Managua, Juventus Managua	TBD	36
TBD	Franklin Ulises López	(Nicaragua)	Real Estelí F.C.	TBD	36
TBD	Eulises Pavón	(Nicaragua)	Diriangén FC	TBD	56
TBD	David Solórzano	(Nicaragua)	Diriangén FC	TBD	31
TBD	Freddy Villareina	(Nicaragua)	Juventus Managua	TBD	31
TBD	Lucas Martella	(Argentina)		TBD	32
TBD	Victor Hugo Sanchez	(Argentina)		TBD	32
TBD	Henry García	(Nicaragua)	UNAN Managua	TBD	38
