= 2006 FIFA World Cup qualification – CONCACAF second round =

Football tournament qualification stage

This page provides the summaries of the CONCACAF second round matches for the 2006 FIFA World Cup qualification. The 14 top-ranked teams from the FIFA ranking for CONCACAF in May 2004 competed, along with the 10 winning teams from the first round.

There were 94 goals scored in 24 matches, for an average of 3.92 goals per match.

== Format ==
In this round 12 of the remaining 24 teams would be eliminated. There were 12 ties and the winners advanced to the next round. All games were scheduled to be played in home and away format.

== Summary ==
Team 1	Agg.	Team 2	1st leg	2nd leg
United States	6–2	Grenada	3–0	3–2
El Salvador	4–3	Bermuda	2–1	2–2
Haiti	1–4	Jamaica	1–1	0–3
Panama	7–0	Saint Lucia	4–0	3–0
Cuba	3–3 (a)	Costa Rica	2–2	1–1
Suriname	2–4	Guatemala	1–1	1–3
Netherlands Antilles	1–6	Honduras	1–2	0–4
Canada	8–0	Belize	4–0	4–0
Dominica	0–18	Mexico	0–10	0–8
Barbados	2–5	Saint Kitts and Nevis	0–2	2–3
Dominican Republic	0–6	Trinidad and Tobago	0–2	0–4
Nicaragua	3–6	Saint Vincent and the Grenadines	2–2	1–4

== Matches ==
June 13, 2004

United States	3–0	Grenada
Beasley 45+1', 70'; Vanney 90+3'	Report

Columbus Crew Stadium
Columbus, United States
Attendance: 9,137
Referee: Mauricio Navarro (Canada)
June 20, 2004

Grenada	2–3	United States
Roberts 12' (pen.); Charles 78'	Report	Donovan 6'; Wolff 19'; Beasley 77'

Grenada National Stadium
St. George's, Grenada
Attendance: 15,267
Referee: Neal Brizan (Trinidad & Tobago)

United States won 6–2 on aggregate and advanced to the third round.

June 13, 2004

El Salvador	2–1	Bermuda
Martínez 14'; Velásquez 54'	Report	Nusum 30'

Estadio Cuscatlán
San Salvador, El Salvador
Attendance: 12,000
Referee: Donald Campos (Nicaragua)
June 20, 2004

Bermuda	2–2	El Salvador
Burgess 4' (pen.); Nusum 21'	Report	Pacheco 20', 41' (pen.)

Bermuda National Stadium
Hamilton, Bermuda
Attendance: 4,000
Referee: Alfredo Whittaker (Cayman Islands)

El Salvador won 4–3 on aggregate and advanced to the third round.

June 12, 2004

Haiti	1–1	Jamaica
Peguero 50'	Report	King 39'

Orange Bowl
Miami, United States
Attendance: 30,000
Referee: Kevin Stott (USA)
June 20, 2004

Jamaica	3–0	Haiti
King 4', 14', 31'	Report

Independence Park
Kingston, Jamaica
Attendance: 22,000
Referee: Rodolfo Sibrian (El Salvador)

Jamaica won 4–1 on aggregate and advanced to the third round.

June 13, 2004

Panama	4–0	Saint Lucia
Valdés 5'; Tejada 18'; Phillips 39'; Brown 75'	Report

Estadio Rommel Fernández
Panama City, Panama
Attendance: 15,000
Referee: George Phillip (Grenada)
June 20, 2004

Saint Lucia	0–3	Panama
	Report	Tejada 14'; Valdés 88'; Blanco 89'

Vieux Fort National Stadium
Vieux Fort, Saint Lucia
Attendance: 400
Referee: Roger Gurley (Saint Vincent and the Grenadines)

Panama won 7–0 on aggregate and advanced to the third round.

June 12, 2004

Cuba	2–2	Costa Rica
Moré 24' (pen.), 75'	Report	Sequeira 12'; Saborío 42'

Estadio Pedro Marrero
Havana, Cuba
Attendance: 18,500
Referee: Benito Archundia (Mexico)
June 20, 2004

Costa Rica	1–1	Cuba
Gómez 31'	Report	Cervantes 45+1'

Estadio Alejandro Morera Soto
Alajuela, Costa Rica
Attendance: 12,000
Referee: Peter Prendergast (Jamaica)

3–3 on aggregate; Costa Rica won on the away goals rule and advanced to the third round.

June 12, 2004

Suriname	1–1	Guatemala
Purperhart 14'	Report	Ramírez 36'

André Kamperveen Stadion
Paramaribo, Suriname
Attendance: 5,500
Referee: Alexandro Jimenez (Costa Rica)
June 20, 2004

Guatemala	3–1	Suriname
Ruiz 21', 85'; Pezzarossi 80'	Report	Brandon 82'

Estadio Mateo Flores
Guatemala City, Guatemala
Attendance: 19,610
Referee: Marco Rodriguez (Mexico)

Guatemala won 4–2 on aggregate and advanced to the third round.

June 12, 2004

Netherlands Antilles	1–2	Honduras
Hosé 75'	Report	Suazo 9', 68'

Stadion Ergilio Hato
Willemstad, Netherlands Antilles
Attendance: 12,000
Referee: Roy McArthur (Guyana)
June 19, 2004

Honduras	4–0	Netherlands Antilles
Guevara 7'; Suazo 22'; Alvarez 50'; Pavón 70'	Report

Estadio Olímpico Metropolitano
San Pedro Sula, Honduras
Attendance: 30,000
Referee: Gilberto Alcalá (Mexico)

Honduras won 6–1 on aggregate and advanced to the third round.

June 13, 2004

Canada	4–0	Belize
Peschisolido 38'; Radzinski 54'; McKenna 75'; Brennan 83'	Report

Richardson Memorial Stadium
Kingston, Canada
Attendance: 8,245
Referee: Carlos Batres (Guatemala)
June 16, 2004

Belize	0–4	Canada
	Report	Radzinski 45'; De Rosario 63', 73'; Brennan 85'

Richardson Memorial Stadium
Kingston, Canada
Attendance: 5,124
Referee: Ted Gordon (Trinidad & Tobago)

Canada won 8–0 on aggregate and advanced to the third round.

June 19, 2004

Dominica	0–10	Mexico
	Report	Bautista 9', 38'; Borgetti 11', 36'; Márquez 16'; Osorno 49'; Lozano 74', 87'; Davino 77'; Palencia 90+2'

Alamodome
San Antonio, United States
Attendance: 36,451
Referee: Barney Callender (Barbados)
June 27, 2004

Mexico	8–0	Dominica
Bautista 2', 36'; Lozano 17', 61'; Borgetti 33', 38'; Oteo 59'; Altamirano 76'	Report

Estadio Victoria
Aguascalientes, Mexico
Attendance: 17,000
Referee: Kevin Stott (USA)

Mexico won 18–0 on aggregate and advanced to the third round.

June 13, 2004

Barbados	0–2	Saint Kitts and Nevis
	Report	Gumbs 78'; Newton 88'

Barbados National Stadium
Bridgetown, Barbados
Attendance: 3,700
Referee: Nery Alfaro (El Salvador)
June 19, 2004

Saint Kitts and Nevis	3–2	Barbados
Gomez 16'; Willock 22', 29'	Report	Skinner 33'; Goodridge 45'

Warner Park
Basseterre, Saint Kitts and Nevis
Attendance: 3,500
Referee: Jose Pineda (Honduras)

Saint Kitts and Nevis won 5–2 on aggregate and advanced to the third round.

June 13, 2004

Dominican Republic	0–2	Trinidad and Tobago
	Report	Andrews 62'; John 90'

Estadio Olímpico Juan Pablo Duarte
Santo Domingo, Dominican Republic
Attendance: 2500
Referee: Roberto Moreno (Panama)
June 20, 2004

Trinidad and Tobago	4–0	Dominican Republic
Scotland 49'; John 71'; Theobald 73'; Sealy 85'	Report

Manny Ramjohn Stadium
Marabella, Trinidad & Tobago
Attendance: 5,500
Referee: Antonius Pinas (Suriname)

Trinidad & Tobago won 6–0 on aggregate and advanced to the third round.

June 13, 2004

Nicaragua	2–2	Saint Vincent and the Grenadines
Palacios 37'; Calero 79'	Report	Haynes 9'; Samuel 43'

Estadio Cacique Diriangén
Diriamba, Nicaragua
Attendance: 7,500
Referee: Roberto Delgado (Cuba)
June 20, 2004

Saint Vincent and the Grenadines	4–1	Nicaragua
Samuel 14', 79'; James 15'; Alonso 86' (o.g.)	Report	Palacios 60'

Arnos Vale Stadium
Kingstown, Saint Vincent and the Grenadines
Attendance: 5,000
Referee: Ibrahim Brohim (Dominica)

Saint Vincent and the Grenadines won 6–3 on aggregate and advanced to the third round.

== Goalscorers ==
There were 94 goals scored in 24 matches, for an average of 3.92 goals per match.

4 goals

- (Jamaica national football team) Marlon King
- (Mexico national football team) Adolfo Bautista
- (Mexico national football team) Jared Borgetti
- (Mexico national football team) Jaime Lozano

3 goals

- (Honduras national football team) David Suazo
- (Saint Vincent and the Grenadines national football team) Shandel Samuel
- (United States men's national soccer team) DaMarcus Beasley

2 goals

- (Bermuda national football team) John Barry Nusum
- (Canada men's national soccer team) Jim Brennan
- (Canada men's national soccer team) Dwayne De Rosario
- (Canada men's national soccer team) Tomasz Radzinski
- (Cuba national football team) Lester Moré
- (El Salvador national football team) Alfredo Pacheco
- (Guatemala national football team) Carlos Ruiz
- (Nicaragua national football team) Emilio Palacios
- (Panama national football team) Julio Dely Valdés
- (Panama national football team) Luis Tejada
- (Saint Kitts and Nevis national football team) Calum Willock
- (Trinidad and Tobago national football team) Stern John

1 goal

- (Barbados national football team) Gregory Goodridge
- (Barbados national football team) Kenroy Skinner
- (Bermuda national football team) Shannon Burgess
- (Canada men's national soccer team) Kevin McKenna
- (Canada men's national soccer team) Paul Peschisolido
- (Costa Rica national football team) Rónald Gómez
- (Costa Rica national football team) Álvaro Saborío
- (Costa Rica national football team) Douglas Sequeira
- (Cuba national football team) Alain Cervantes
- (El Salvador national football team) Chepe Martínez
- (El Salvador national football team) Víctor Velásquez
- (Grenada national football team) Ricky Charles
- (Grenada national football team) Jason Roberts
- (Guatemala national football team) Dwight Pezzarossi
- (Guatemala national football team) Guillermo Ramírez
- (Haiti national football team) Jean-Philippe Peguero
- (Honduras national football team) Edgar Alvarez
- (Honduras national football team) Amado Guevara
- (Honduras national football team) Carlos Pavón
- (Mexico national football team) Hector Altamirano
- (Mexico national football team) Duilio Davino
- (Mexico national football team) Rafael Márquez
- (Mexico national football team) Daniel Osorno
- (Mexico national football team) David Oteo
- (Mexico national football team) Francisco Palencia
- (Netherlands Antilles national football team) Brutil Hosé
- (Nicaragua national football team) Rudel Calero
- (Panama national football team) Alberto Blanco
- (Panama national football team) Roberto Brown
- (Panama national football team) Ricardo Phillips
- (Saint Kitts and Nevis national football team) Darryl Gomez
- (Saint Kitts and Nevis national football team) Keith Gumbs
- (Saint Kitts and Nevis national football team) Adam Newton
- (Saint Vincent and the Grenadines national football team) Renson Haynes
- (Saint Vincent and the Grenadines national football team) Marlon James
- (Suriname national football team) Gino Brandon
- (Suriname national football team) Dennis Purperhart
- (Trinidad and Tobago national football team) Marvin Andrews
- (Trinidad and Tobago national football team) Jason Scotland
- (Trinidad and Tobago national football team) Scott Sealy
- (Trinidad and Tobago national football team) Densill Theobald
- (United States men's national soccer team) Landon Donovan
- (United States men's national soccer team) Greg Vanney
- (United States men's national soccer team) Josh Wolff

1 own goal

- (Nicaragua national football team) Carlos Alonso (against Saint Vincent and the Grenadines)
