= Danny Téllez =

Nicaraguan footballer

Personal information
- Full name: Danny Ernesto Téllez Murillo
- Date of birth: 16 August 1974 (age 52)
- Place of birth: Managua, Nicaragua
- Height: 1.82 m (6 ft 0 in)
- Position: Goalkeeper

Senior career*
| Years | Team | Apps | (Gls) |
| 1989–1991 | Bautista | | |
| 1993–1995 | Masachapa | | |
- Juventus
| 1997 | Joe Public | | |
| 1998 | Walter Ferretti | | |
| 1999 | AD Guanacasteca | | |
| 1999 | Walter Ferretti | | |
| 2000 | Dragón | | |
| 2000–2001 | Real Estelí | | |
| 2001–2002 | Parmalat | | |
| 2003–2006 | América Managua | | |
| 2006 | Masatepe | | |
| 2007–2010 | Managua | | |

International career
| 2000–2004 | Nicaragua | 8 | (0) |
- * Club domestic league appearances and goals

Danny Ernesto Téllez Murillo (born 16 August 1974) is a Nicaraguan former professional footballer who played as a goalkeeper.

== Club career ==
Nicknamed La Pantera (The Panther), Téllez played his early years for hometown clubs Bautista, Juventus and Masachapa before moving abroad in 1997 for Trinidadian side Joe Public and Costa Rican outfit AD Guanacasteca whom he joined in summer 1999 along with compatriot Hamilton West. After a spell back home with another Managuan team, Walter Ferretti, he joined Dragón of El Salvador in summer 2000.

He left them after a short spell to resume his career in Nicaragua and played for Real Estelí, Parmalat and América Managua, whom he left in summer 2006 for a short stint at Masatepe. He started the 2007 season with second division Managua.

== International career ==
Téllez made his debut for Nicaragua in a March 2000 World Cup qualification match against Honduras and has earned a total of 8 caps, scoring no goals. He has represented his country in 4 FIFA World Cup qualification matches and played at the 2003 UNCAF Nations Cup.

His final international was an April 2004 friendly match against Bermuda.
