= Ricardo Vega =

Nicaraguan footballer (born 1982)

Personal information
- Full name: Ricardo Antonio Vega Zamora
- Date of birth: 20 December 1982 (age 43)
- Place of birth: Nicaragua
- Height: 1.80 m (5 ft 11 in)
- Position: Forward

Senior career*
Years	Team	Apps	(Gls)
2005–2006	Scorpion FC		
2005–2007	Deportivo Masatepe		
2007–2009	Real Estelí		
2010–2012	Deportivo Ocotal		
2013	Deportivo Walter Ferretti		
2014	Chinandega FC		

International career
2008–	Nicaragua	6	(2)
- * Club domestic league appearances and goals

Ricardo Antonio Vega Zamora (born 20 December 1982) is a Nicaraguan former footballer who played as a forward.

== Club career ==
Born in Nicaragua, Vega made his senior debut with Scorpion FC. He later played for Deportivo Masatepe, then joined Nicaraguan giants Real Esteli F.C. and going on to play three more clubs Deportivo Ocotal, Deportivo Walter Ferretti and Chinandega FC. He has become a prolific goalscorers scoring 126 goals over five clubs making him the third highest goalscorer in Nicaragua primera division

== International career ==
Vega made his senior debut for Nicaragua in a February 2008 World Cup qualification match against Netherlands Antilles and has earned a total of six caps, scoring two goals. He has represented his country in two FIFA World Cup qualification matches and played four friendlies against Puerto Rico.

His final international was a Friendly match against Puerto Rico.

== Career statistics ==
Scores and results list Nicaraguas' goal tally first.

N.	Date	Venue	Opponent	Score	Result	Competition
1.	24 February 2012	Estadio Nacional de Fútbol, Managua, Nicaragua	Puerto Rico	1–0	4-1	Friendly match
2.	26 February 2012	Estadio Nacional de Fútbol, Managua, Nicaragua	Puerto Rico	1–0	1–0	Friendly match
