= Hamilton West (footballer) =

Nicaraguan footballer (born 1977)

Personal information
- Full name: Hamilton Maxwell West Santana
- Date of birth: 16 October 1977 (age 49)
- Place of birth: Managua, Nicaragua
- Height: 1.77 m (5 ft 9 1/2 in)
- Position: Winger

Youth career
- Bautista

Senior career*
Years	Team	Apps	(Gls)
1997–1999	Masachapa		
1998	→ ADET (loan)		
1999–2001	AD Guanacasteca		
2001	Real Estelí	10	(2)
2002	Osa		
2003	Real Estelí		
2003–2004	Parmalat		
2005–2008	Masatepe		
2008–2009	Chinandega		

International career^{‡}
1997–2007	Nicaragua	21	(0)
- * Club domestic league appearances and goals ‡ National team caps and goals as of 19 January 2014

Hamilton Maxwell West Santana (born 16 October 1977) is a Nicaraguan former footballer.

== Club career ==
West started his career at Masachapa and moved abroad to join El Salvadorans ADET on loan in 1998 and then moved to Costa Rican side AD Guanacasteca in summer 1999 to play alongside compatriot Danny Téllez. After a season with Real Estelí, where he scored 5 goals in a league match against Chinandega, he returned to Costa Rica to play for Osa. In 2003, he signed with Parmalat. In January 2009, West's goal secured second division side Chinandega promotion to the top tier.

== International career ==
West made his debut for Nicaragua in an April 1997 UNCAF Nations Cup match against Costa Rica and has earned a total of 21 caps, scoring no goals. He has represented his country in 4 FIFA World Cup qualification matches and played at the 1997, 1999, 2001, 2003, 2007 UNCAF Nations Cups.

His final international was a February 2007 UNCAF Nations Cup match against Honduras.
