= Víctor René Mendieta =

Víctor René Mendieta may refer to:

- Víctor René Mendieta (footballer, born 1961), Panamanian football striker and football manager
- Víctor René Mendieta (footballer, born 1982), Panamanian football striker, and son of the footballer born 1961
