= Armando Collado =

Salvadoran-born Nicaraguan footballer

Personal information
- Full name: Armando José Collado Lanuza
- Date of birth: November 17, 1985 (age 40)
- Place of birth: Tecoluca, San Vicente, El Salvador
- Height: 1.77 m (5 ft 9 1/2 in)
- Position: Defender

Youth career
- 2001: Parmalat "B"

Senior career*
| Years | Team | Apps | (Gls) |
| 2002–2005 | Parmalat | | |
| 2005–2006 | América Managua | | |
| 2006–2007 | Once Municipal | | |
| 2007–2008 | Nejapa | 33 | (17) |
| 2008–2009 | Real Estelí | | |
| 2009 | Alianza | | |
| 2010 | Real Estelí | | |

International career^{‡}
| 2008–2009 | Nicaragua | 17 | (11) |
- * Club domestic league appearances and goals ‡ National team caps and goals as of November 6, 2009

Armando José Collado Lanuza (born November 17, 1985) is a Salvadoran-born Nicaraguan footballer.

== Club career ==
Collado started his career at Parmalat and played for América Managua before returning to El Salvador and joining Once Municipal. He also had a spell at Nejapa then joined Nicaraguan side Real Estelí in summer 2008.

He moved back to El Salvador in summer 2009 to play for Alianza and be reunited with manager Nelson Ancheta. In January 2010 he went back to Estelí again to help them regain the Nicaraguan league title.

=== Lifetime suspension ===
In January 2011, the Nicaraguan FA (FENIFUT) suspended Collado from playing football pending an investigation relating him to Wilson Raj Perumal and he was subsequently accused of trying to fix matches in the CONCACAF Champions League in the 2009–10 and 2010-11 seasons.

On October 16, 2012, Collado was given a lifetime ban from all football-related activities by FIFA, in relation to match fixing in a game between Nicaragua and Guatemala on 4 September 2010.

== International career ==
Collado made his debut for Nicaragua in a February 2008 FIFA World Cup qualification match against the Netherlands Antilles and has earned a total of 9 caps, scoring no goals. He has represented his country in 2 FIFA World Cup qualification matches and played at the 2009 UNCAF Nations Cup as well as at the 2009 CONCACAF Gold Cup.

His final international was a July 2009 CONCACAF Gold Cup match against Panama.
