= Álvaro Jiménez =

Álvaro Jiménez is the name of:

- Álvaro Jiménez (Guatemalan footballer) (born 1974), Guatemalan professional footballer
- Álvaro Jiménez (Spanish footballer) (born 1995), Spanish professional footballer
