= Carlos Alonso (Nicaraguan footballer) =

Nicaraguan footballer (born 1979)

Personal information
- Full name: Carlos Rigoberto Alonso Gómez
- Date of birth: August 25, 1979 (age 47)
- Place of birth: Chinandega, Nicaragua
- Height: 1.83 m (6 ft 0 in)
- Position: Defender

Senior career*
Years	Team	Apps	(Gls)
1996–1998	FC Chinandega		
1998–1999	Walter Ferretti		
1999–2000	Real Estelí		
2000–2002	Parmalat		
2002–2005	Real Estelí		
2005–2006	Diriangén		
2006–2007	Scorpión		
2007–2008	Diriangén		
2008–2009	VCP Chinandega		
2010	Real Estelí		
2011	América		

International career^{‡}
2000–2010	Nicaragua	37	(0)
- * Club domestic league appearances and goals ‡ National team caps and goals as of 18 January 2014

Carlos Rigoberto Alonso Gómez (born August 25, 1979) is a retired Nicaraguan footballer.

== Club career ==
A much-travelled defender, Alonso made his league debut with FC Chinandega in 1996 and played for several Nicaraguan league clubs in a career spanning over 15 years. His clubs include Walter Ferretti, Real Estelí, Parmalat and Diriangén. In summer 2006 he joined Scorpión after just winning the league with Diriangén.

In January 2010 he left VCP Chinandega and returned to Estelí, only to sign with América in November 2010.

== International career ==
Alonso made his debut for Nicaragua in a March 2000 World Cup qualification match against El Salvador and has earned a total of 37 caps, scoring no goals. He has represented his country in 5 FIFA World Cup qualification matches and played at the 2001, 2003, 2005, 2007, 2009 UNCAF Nations Cups, as well as at the 2009 CONCACAF Gold Cup. He also has been national team captain.

His final international was a September 2010 friendly match against Guatemala.
