= Wilber Sánchez (footballer) =

Nicaraguan footballer (born 1979)

Personal information
- Full name: Wilber Alejandro Sánchez Ramírez
- Date of birth: October 24, 1979 (age 47)
- Place of birth: Managua, Nicaragua
- Height: 1.75 m (5 ft 9 in)
- Position: Striker

Team information
- Current team: Real Estelí
- Number: 8

Youth career
- 1998–1999: Don Bosco

Senior career*
Years	Team	Apps	(Gls)
1999–2001	Inter Barrio Cuba		
2001–2003	Walter Ferretti		
2003–2005	Parmalat		(36)
2005–2006	Masatepe		(18)
2006	Real Estelí		(8)
2007	San Salvador	12	(4)
2007–2008	América Managua		(10)
2008–2010	Walter Ferretti		(20)
2010–2013	Real Estelí		(21)

International career^{‡}
2001–2011	Nicaragua	19	(0)
- * Club domestic league appearances and goals ‡ National team caps and goals as of 15 January 2014

Wilber Alejandro Sánchez Ramírez (born October 24, 1979) is a Nicaraguan footballer who currently plays for Real Estelí.

== Club career ==
He started his career at second division Inter Barrio Cuba and played for Walter Ferretti, Parmalat, Masatepe and Real Estelí.

=== El Salvador ===
After a stunning performance in the 2007 UNCAF Nations Cup, played in San Salvador, Sánchez joined San Salvador F.C. In his debut game, the speedy striker came on as a substitute in the 65th minutes, but managed to score 2 headed goals, giving his side the victory, 3–2, against Vista Hermosa.

In June 2007 he was snapped up by América Managua but left them for Walter Ferretti a year later. He has played for Real Estelí since 2010.

== International career ==
Sánchez made his debut for Nicaragua in an April 2001 friendly match against Belize and has earned a total of 19 caps, scoring no goals. He has represented his country in 2 FIFA World Cup qualification matches and played at the 2001, 2007, 2009, and 2011 UNCAF Nations Cups as well as at the 2009 CONCACAF Gold Cup.

His final international was a January 2011 UNCAF Nations Cup match against Belize.

== Personal life ==
He is married to Jessica Matamoros and they have a daughter, Briana.
