= Estadio Glorias Costeñas =

Sports venue in Bluefields, Nicaragua

Coordinates: 12°00′47″N 83°45′58″W

Glorias Costeñas Stadium is a multi-use stadium in Bluefields, South Caribbean Coast Autonomous Region. It is used for football matches and is the home stadium to Deportivo Bluefields and Nicaraguan baseball team Costa Caribe also play their home matches at the stadium.

The stadium holds 4,000 spectators.
