= Alexis Somarriba =

Nicaraguan footballer

Personal information
- Full name: Alexis Lennin Somarriba Vargas
- Date of birth: May 11, 1994 (age 32)
- Place of birth: Nicaragua
- Position: Midfielder

Team information
- Current team: Walter Ferretti
- Number: 11

Youth career
- Real Estelí

Senior career*
Years	Team	Apps	(Gls)
201?–2015	Real Estelí		
2015–2017	Managua	52	(11)
2017–2018	Juventus Managua	31	(7)
2018	Real Estelí	16	(5)
2019–2020	Juventus Managua	44	(8)
2020	Real Estelí	7	(1)
2021–	Walter Ferretti	80	(4)

International career^{‡}
2014–	Nicaragua	7	(0)
- * Club domestic league appearances and goals as of 18:34, 23 December 2023 (UTC) ‡ National team caps and goals as of 18:34, 23 December 2023 (UTC)

Alexis Somarriba (born 11 May 1994) is a Nicaraguan footballer who plays for Walter Ferretti.
