= David Solórzano =

Nicaraguan footballer (born 1980)

Personal information
- Full name: David Sebastián Solórzano Sánchez
- Date of birth: November 8, 1980 (age 45)
- Place of birth: Diriamba, Nicaragua
- Height: 1.73 m (5 ft 8 in)
- Position: Defender

Team information
- Current team: Diriangén
- Number: 11

Senior career*
Years	Team	Apps	(Gls)
1998–2000	Diriangén		
2000–2001	Parmalat		
2001–2003	Diriangén		
2003–2005	Real Estelí		
2005–2006	Masatepe		
2007	Managua		
2007–2016	Diriangén	137	(51)
2016–2018	UNAN Managua	37	(11)

International career^{‡}
1999–2014	Nicaragua	50	(9)
- * Club domestic league appearances and goals ‡ National team caps and goals as of December 2016

David Sebastián Solórzano Sánchez (born 8 November 1980) is a Nicaraguan footballer who currently plays for Diriangén and plays for the Nicaragua national football team.

He is Nicaragua's all-time record cap holder.

== Club career ==
He has played for and skippered several leading Nicaraguan clubs including hometown club Diriangén, Parmalat, Real Estelí and Masatepe. He started the 2007 season with second division Managua.

=== Controversies ===
When with Parmalat in 2001, he was controversially banned for six months for allegedly attacking referee Fidel Bonilla in a game against Diriangén, despite Bonilla claiming it was only an accident. In 2004, Solórzano signed a contract with Diriangén while still tied to Estelí but then made a U-turn and declared himself committed to Estelí.

== International career ==
Solórzano made his debut for Nicaragua in a March 1999 UNCAF Nations Cup match against Guatemala and has, as of September 2014, earned a total of 49 caps, scoring no goals. He has represented his country in 9 FIFA World Cup qualification matches and played at the 1999, 2001, 2003, 2007, 2009, 2011 and 2013 UNCAF Nations Cups as well as at the 2009 CONCACAF Gold Cup.

=== International goals ===
Scores and results list Nicaragua's goal tally first.

No	Date	Venue	Opponent	Score	Result	Competition
1.	30 April 2004	Estadio Cacique Diriangén, Diriamba, Nicaragua	Bermuda	1–0	2–0	Friendly
