= Maurizio Battistini (football manager) =

Italian football manager (born 1945)

Personal information
- Date of birth: 18 February 1945 (age 81)
- Place of birth: Italy

Managerial career
- Years: Team
- 1986–1987: Fidenza
- 1998–1999: Crociati Noceto
- 2001–2002: UTA
- 2003–2004: Parmalat
- 2004: Nicaragua
- 2004–2005: Bellinzona

Maurizio Battistini (born 18 February 1945) is an Italian former football manager.

== Early life ==
Battistini was born in 1945 in Italy. He is a native of Parma, Italy.

== Career ==
In 1986, Battistini was appointed manager of Italian side Fidenza. In 1998, he was appointed manager of Italian side Crociati Noceto. In 2001, he was appointed manager of Romanian side UTA. In 2003, he was appointed manager of Nicraguan side Parmalat. In 2004, he was appointed manager of the Nicaragua national football team. He was described as "achieved Nicaragua's first victory in a Nations Cup". After that, he was appointed manager of Swiss side Bellinzona.

== Management style ==
Battistini was described as manager "who commanded respect... made himself heard... devised different strategies above the limitations of the team... who knew how to get the most out of the human material available".

== Personal life ==
Battistini has a daughter. She has worked as a teacher.
