= Axel Villanueva =

Nicaraguan footballer (born 1989)

Personal information
- Full name: Axel Mathias Villanueva Sandoval
- Date of birth: August 10, 1989 (age 37)
- Place of birth: Managua, Nicaragua
- Height: 1.72 m (5 ft 7 1/2 in)
- Position: Attacking midfielder

Team information
- Current team: Walter Ferretti
- Number: 11

Senior career*
Years	Team	Apps	(Gls)
2010–2013	Walter Ferretti		
2014	Tauro	1	(0)
2014–2017	Walter Ferreti		

International career^{‡}
2010–2013	Nicaragua	15	(2)
- * Club domestic league appearances and goals ‡ National team caps and goals as of 18 January 2014

Axel Mathias Villanueva Sandoval (born August 10, 1989) is a Nicaraguan footballer who currently plays midfield for Deportivo Walter Ferretti in the Primera División de Nicaragua.

== Club career ==
Villanueva started his career with Walter Ferretti. He joined Panamanian side Tauro for the 2014 Clausura and signed a one-year contract despite Ferreti wanting just a loan deal.

== International career ==
Villanueva made his debut for Nicaragua in a September 2010 friendly match against Guatemala and has, as of January 2014, earned a total of 15 caps, scoring 2 goals. He has represented his country in 2 FIFA World Cup qualification matches and played at the 2011 and 2013 Copa Centroamericana.

=== International goals ===
Scores and results list Honduras' goal tally first.

N.	Date	Venue	Opponent	Score	Result	Competition
1.	26 February 2012	Dennis Martínez National Stadium, Managua, Nicaragua	Puerto Rico	2–1	4–1	Friendly match
2.	26 February 2012	Dennis Martínez National Stadium, Managua, Nicaragua	Puerto Rico	3–1	4–1	Friendly match
