= Sergio Chamorro =

Nicaraguan footballer (born 1971)

Personal information
- Full name: Sergio Fernando Chamorro Fletes
- Date of birth: 25 November 1971 (age 54)
- Place of birth: Nicaragua
- Height: 1.90 m (6 ft 3 in)
- Position: Goalkeeper

Senior career*
Years	Team	Apps	(Gls)
1987–1998	Walter Ferretti		
1999–2007	Real Estelí		

International career
1991–2004	Nicaragua	14	(0)
- * Club domestic league appearances and goals

Sergio Fernando Chamorro Fletes (born 25 November 1971) is a Nicaraguan former professional footballer who played as a goalkeeper.

== Club career ==
Chamorro made his national league debut for Walter Ferretti in 1987 against Chinandega and also played for local top side Real Estelí whom he joined in 1999.

From September 2005 he held out for almost nine successive clean sheets and was unbeaten in 749 minutes, breaking the previous Nicaraguan league record of former Esteli goalkeeper Glen Omier.

== International career ==
Chamorro made his debut for Nicaragua in an April 1991 UNCAF Nations Cup qualification match against El Salvador and has earned a total of 14 caps. He has represented his country in three FIFA World Cup qualification matches and played at the 1995 and 2003 UNCAF Nations Cups.

His final international game was a June 2004 FIFA World Cup qualification match against Saint Vincent and the Grenadines.

== Retirement and personal life ==
During his playing days with Walter Ferretti, Chamorro completed a degree in medicine which earned him his nickname el Docter. His study though denied him to play abroad. He is a specialist in orthopedics and traumatology doctor. In 1999, he married Dr Johanna Camacho and they have two sons named Alfredo and Andrés.
