= Mauricio Alpízar =

Costa Rican footballer (born 1979)

Personal information
- Full name: José Mauricio Alpízar Castro
- Date of birth: 30 January 1979 (age 47)
- Place of birth: Alajuela, Costa Rica
- Height: 1.79 m (5 ft 10 in)
- Position: Midfielder

Senior career*
Years	Team	Apps	(Gls)
2000–2001	Herediano		
2001–2002	Santa Bárbara	26	(2)
2002–2004	Herediano		
2005	Puntarenas	13	(3)
2006–2007	Herediano	32	(4)
2007	Liberia Mía	5	(1)

International career
2003	Costa Rica	3	(0)
- * Club domestic league appearances and goals

José Mauricio Alpízar Castro (born 30 January 1979 in Alajuela) is a retired Costa Rican professional footballer.

== Club career ==
Alpízar played for Herediano, whom he rejoined from Santa Bárbara, Puntarenas, for whom he scored a hattrick against Liberia in April 2005, and Liberia Mía in the Primera Division de Costa Rica.

== International career ==
Alpízar made three appearances for Costa Rica, at the UNCAF Nations Cup 2003.

Alpízar has also played for Costa Rica at 1999 FIFA World Youth Championship in Nigeria.
