= Wilber Sánchez =

Wilber Sánchez may refer to:

- Wilber Sánchez (footballer)
- Wilber Sánchez (wrestler)
