= Jason Casco =

Nicaraguan footballer

Personal information
- Full name: Jason Domingo Casco
- Date of birth: February 13, 1990 (age 36)
- Place of birth: Managua, Nicaragua
- Position: Defender

Team information
- Current team: Real Esteli F.C.
- Number: 3

Senior career*
Years	Team	Apps	(Gls)
2009–2013	Juventus Managua		
2013–2015	Walter Ferretti	62	(1)
2016–2020	Real Estelí F.C.	129	(6)
2020-	Juventus Managua		

International career^{‡}
2014–	Nicaragua	28	(0)
- * Club domestic league appearances and goals as of 2017 ‡ National team caps and goals as of 9 July 2017

Jason Casco (born February 13, 1990) is a Nicaraguan football player who currently plays for Real Estelí F.C.
