= Omar Hinestroza =

Panamanian footballer (born 1994)

Personal information
- Full name: Omar Alexander Hinestroza González
- Date of birth: 27 June 1994 (age 32)
- Place of birth: Colon, Panama
- Height: 1.85 m (6 ft 1 in)
- Position: Forward

Team information
- Current team: Walter Ferretti

Senior career*
Years	Team	Apps	(Gls)
2016–2017	Correcaminos UAT	13	(1)
2018	Chorrillo	10	(2)
2018–2019	Universitario	31	(4)
2019–2021	Tauro	20	(1)
2021–2022	Independiente	21	(2)
2022–2023	Árabe Unido	31	(4)
2023–2024	Universitario	28	(4)
2024–	Walter Ferretti	17	(3)
- * Club domestic league appearances and goals

Omar Alexander Hinestroza González (born June 27, 1994) is a Panamanian footballer who currently plays for Walter Ferretti.
