= Érick Díaz =

Panamanian footballer (born 2006)

Personal information
- Full name: Érick Manuel Díaz González
- Date of birth: 4 March 2006 (age 20)
- Place of birth: Panama City, Panama
- Height: 1.83 m (6 ft 0 in)
- Position: Centre-back

Team information
- Current team: Los Angeles FC 2, on loan from Tauro
- Number: 55

Youth career
- Neftagol
- Tauro

Senior career*
Years	Team	Apps	(Gls)
2023–	Tauro	16	(0)
2025–	→Los Angeles FC 2 (loan)	22	(1)
2025	→Los Angeles FC (loan)	0	(0)

International career^{‡}
2022–2023	Panama U17	10	(1)
2024–	Panama U20	6	(0)
2023–	Panama	2	(0)
- * Club domestic league appearances and goals as of 18:32, 11 October 2025 (UTC) ‡ National team caps and goals as of 18:32, 11 October 2025 (UTC)

Érick Manuel Díaz González (born 4 March 2006) is a Panamanian professional footballer who plays as a centre-back for the MLS Next Pro club Los Angeles FC 2, on loan from Tauro, and the Panama national team.

== Club career ==
A youth product of the Panamanian club Tauro, Díaz debuted for their senior team in the Liga Panameña de Fútbol in 2023, and helped them win the 2023–24 edition of the competition. On 27 February 2025, he was loan out to MLS Next Pro club Los Angeles FC 2 on a year-long loan, with an option for 3 seasons until 2028. On 25 July 2025, he was called up to the senior Los Angeles FC squad on a short-term loan for a Major League Soccer match against the Portland Timbers.

== International career ==
Díaz was called up to the Panama U17s for the 2023 FIFA U-17 World Cup. On 27 August 2023, he debuted with the senior Panama national team for a friendly 2–1 win over Bolivia. He also made the squad for the 2024 CONCACAF U-20 Championship. He again was called up to the Panama U20s for the 2025 FIFA U-20 World Cup.

== Personal life ==
Díaz is the son of the Panamanian former international footballer Neftalí Díaz.

== Honours ==
Tauro

- Liga Panameña de Fútbol: 2023–24
