= Gilberto Murgas =

Salvadoran footballer (born 1981)

Personal information
- Full name: Gilberto Alfredo Murgas Fajardo
- Date of birth: January 22, 1981 (age 45)
- Place of birth: El Refugio, Ahuachapán, El Salvador
- Height: 1.73 m (5 ft 8 in)
- Position: Midfielder

Youth career
- 1999–2000: FAS

Senior career*
Years	Team	Apps	(Gls)
2000–2006	FAS		
2007–2008	Chalatenango	35	(4)
2008–2010	Águila	56	(8)
2010–2011	FAS		

International career
2000–2007	El Salvador	40	(4)
- * Club domestic league appearances and goals

Gilberto Alfredo Murgas Fajardo (born January 22, 1981, in El Refugio, El Salvador) is a retired Salvadoran football player.

== Club career ==
Nicknamed Gárgamel, he started his career as a midfielder for FAS, making his debut against Belizean side Acros Verdes in March 1999. He left FAS for Chalatenango in 2007 only to move on to play for Águila a year later.

After returning to FAS in July 2010 he decided to retire in 2011 and move to Houston, where he started a construction company.

== International career ==
Murgas made his debut for El Salvador in a July 2000 friendly match against Mexico and has earned a total of 40 caps, scoring 4 goals.

He has represented his country in 6 FIFA World Cup qualification matches and played at the 2003, 2005 and 2007 UNCAF Nations Cups as well as at the 2003 CONCACAF Gold Cup.

His final international game was a February 2007 UNCAF Nations Cup match against Costa Rica.

=== International goals ===
Scores and results list El Salvador's goal tally first.

#	Date	Venue	Opponent	Score	Result	Competition
1	15 February 2003	Estadio La Pedregaleña, Colón, Panama	Honduras	1-0	1-0	2003 UNCAF Nations Cup
2	8 July 2003	Reliant Stadium, Houston, US	Guatemala	1-2	1-2	Friendly match
3	19 July 2003	Gillette Stadium, Foxborough, Massachusetts, US	Costa Rica	1-1	2-5	2003 CONCACAF Gold Cup
4	12 May 2004	Robertson Stadium, Houston, US	Haiti	2-2	3-3	Friendly match

== Personal life ==
Murgas has two children.
