= Carlos Figueroa (footballer) =

Guatemalan footballer (born 1980)

Personal information
- Full name: Carlos Fernando Figueroa Martínez
- Date of birth: 19 April 1980 (age 46)
- Place of birth: Guatemala City, Guatemala
- Height: 1.71 m (5 ft 7 in)
- Position: Midfielder

Team information
- Current team: Comunicaciones
- Number: 29

Senior career*
Years	Team	Apps	(Gls)
2001–2003	Municipal		
2003–2004	Petapa		
2004–2007	Municipal	121	(11)
2008–2009	Xelajú	17	(3)
2009	Olimpia	7	(1)
2010	Municipal		(2)
2011	Xelajú	9	(1)
2012–2016	Comunicaciones	131	(9)

International career^{‡}
2003–2016	Guatemala	62	(5)
- * Club domestic league appearances and goals as of 9 February 2010 ‡ National team caps and goals as of 9 February 2010

Carlos Fernando Figueroa (born 19 April 1980 in Guatemala) is a Guatemalan exprofessional football midfielder and his last team was CSD Comunicaciones in Guatemala's top division.

He also was a member of the Guatemala national team.

== Club career ==
Figueroa began his career with CSD Municipal in 2001, and joined Olimpia of Paraguay from Xelajú for the Apertura 2009 tournament. He scored one goal on his debut against Club Libertad.

== International career ==
Figueroa made his debut for Guatemala in a January 2003 friendly match against El Salvador and has made 37 appearances (scoring 3 goals), including three matches at the 2005 CONCACAF Gold Cup and four matches at the 2007 CONCACAF Gold Cup. He has also represented his country in 12 FIFA World Cup qualification matches.

His final international match so far was a November 2008 World Cup qualification match against the United States.

== Career statistics ==
=== International goals ===
Scores and results list. Guatemala's goal tally first.

#	Date	Venue	Opponent	Score	Result	Competition
1.	February 18, 2003	Estadio Rommel Fernández, Panama City, Panama	Nicaragua	5–0	5–0	Continental qualifier
2.	February 23, 2003	Estadio Rommel Fernández, Panama City, Panama	Honduras	2–0	2–1	Continental qualifier
3.	June 3, 2004	Estadio Cuscatlán, San Salvador, El Salvador	El Salvador	2–0	3–0	Friendly
4.	September 4, 2010	Lockhart Stadium, Fort Lauderdale, USA	Nicaragua	2–0	5–0	Friendly
5.	October 12, 2012	Estadio Mateo Flores, Guatemala City, Guatemala	Jamaica	1–0	2–1	World Cup qualifier
