= Samuel Wilson (footballer) =

Nicaraguan footballer

Personal information
- Full name: Samuel Israel Wilson Rostrán
- Date of birth: April 9, 1983 (age 43)
- Place of birth: Chinandega, Nicaragua
- Position: Striker

Team information
- Current team: UNAN Managua

Senior career*
Years	Team	Apps	(Gls)
1999–2003	Chinandega		(13)
2003–2004	Walter Ferretti		(1)
2005–2006	Scorpión		(10)
2006–2007	Real Estelí		(22)
2007	Atlético Olanchano	4	(0)
2008–2017	Real Estelí		(90)
2017–2018	UNAN Managua	28	(3)
2018–2019	Walter Ferretti	29	(0)
2019–2020	Juventus F.C.	10	(0)

International career
2001–2013	Nicaragua	29	(4)
- * Club domestic league appearances and goals as of 22 August 2017

Samuel Israel Wilson Rostrán (born April 9, 1983) is a Nicaraguan footballer who plays for UNAN Managua in the Nicaraguan Primera División.

== Club career ==
Samuel Wilson was born in Chinandega Nicaragua, he is an Afro-Nicaraguan. He started his career at local team Chinandega and played for Walter Ferretti and Scorpión and had a short spell abroad with Atlético Olanchano in the Liga Nacional de Fútbol de Honduras. He has been with Estelí since the 2006–07 season.

On 12 January 2014, Wilson scored his 100th goal in a league game against his first club, Chinandega.

== International career ==
Wilson made his debut for Nicaragua in a May 2001 UNCAF Nations Cup match against El Salvador and has, as of December 2013, earned a total of 29 caps, scoring 4 goals. He has represented his country in 6 FIFA World Cup qualification matches and played at the 2001, 2007, 2009, 2011 and 2013 UNCAF Nations Cups as well as at the 2009 CONCACAF Gold Cup.

He scored a brace as Nicaragua defeated Guatemala to take fifth place in the UNCAF Nations Cup 2009.

=== International goals ===
Scores and results list Nicaragua's goal tally first.

N.	Date	Venue	Opponent	Score	Result	Competition
1.	10 February 2007	Estadio Cuscatlán, San Salvador, El Salvador	El Salvador	1–1	1–2	2007 UNCAF Nations Cup
2.	15 February 2007	Estadio Cuscatlán, San Salvador, El Salvador	Honduras	1–3	1–9	2007 UNCAF Nations Cup
3.	29 January 2009	Estadio Tiburcio Carias Andino, Tegucigalpa, Honduras	Guatemala	1–0	2–0	2009 UNCAF Nations Cup
4.	29 January 2009	Estadio Tiburcio Carias Andino, Tegucigalpa, Honduras	Guatemala	2–0	2–0	2009 UNCAF Nations Cup
