= Mario Méndez (Panamanian footballer) =

Panamanian footballer and manager (born 1977)

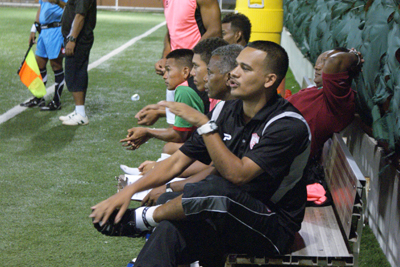

Personal information
- Full name: Mario Uriel Méndez
- Date of birth: January 5, 1977 (age 49)
- Place of birth: David, Panama
- Height: 1.81 m (5 ft 11 1/2 in)
- Position: Defender

Youth career
- Deportivo Vianeth
- Cruz Azul F.C.

Senior career*
| Years | Team | Apps | (Gls) |
| 1995–1998 | Chiriquí | 81 | (11) |
| 1998–2005 | Tauro | 133 | (17) |
| 2005 | San Francisco | | |
| 2006 | Chorrillo | 26 | (2) |
| 2007–2008 | Atlético Chiriquí | 36 | (1) |

International career
| 1996–2004 | Panama | 33 | (4) |

Managerial career
- 2008–2010: Atlético Chiriquí
- 2011: Panama U-20 (assistant)
- 2011: Chorrillo (assistant)
- 2012–2013: Atlético Chiriquí
- * Club domestic league appearances and goals

Mario Uriel Méndez, commonly known as El Cholito (born January 5, 1977, in David, Chiriquí) is a retired Panamanian football defender and currently is a manager.

== Playing career ==
=== Club ===
In Panama, Méndez played for Chiriquí, Tauro, Chorrillo, whom he joined in January 2006 from San Francisco, and Atlético Chiriquí. In 2004, he had the opportunity to go to trial to Vasco da Gama but hurt his Achilles tendon in Julio Dely Valdés and Jorge Dely Valdés farewell game.

=== International ===
Méndez made his debut for Panama in an August 1996 friendly match against Honduras and has earned a total of 33 caps, scoring 4 goals. He represented his country in 8 FIFA World Cup qualification matches and El Cholito was part of the Panama squad that participated in the UNCAF Nations Cup 2003 held in Guatemala.

His final international was an August 2003 friendly match against Paraguay.

=== International goals ===
Scores and results list Panama's goal tally first.

| # | Date | Venue | Opponent | Score | Result | Competition |
|---|---|---|---|---|---|---|
| 1 | 16 February 2000 | Estadio Rommel Fernández, Panama City, Panama | El Salvador | 4–1 | 4–1 | Friendly match |
| 2 | 19 March 2000 | Estadio Cacique Diriangén, Diriamba, Nicaragua | Nicaragua | 1–0 | 2–0 | 2002 FIFA World Cup qualification |
| 3 | 14 March 2001 | Estadio Rommel Fernández, Panama City, Panama | El Salvador | 1–0 | 1–0 | Friendly match |
| 4 | 16 February 2003 | Estadio Rommel Fernández, Panama City, Panama | Guatemala | 1–0 | 2–0 | 2003 UNCAF Nations Cup |

== Managerial career ==
Shortly after retiring in 2008, Méndez became the manager of Atlético Chiriquí (the only team in the Liga Panameña de Fútbol Chiriquí). In the 2009 Apertura I championship, he led Atlético Chiriquí to their first qualification to the semifinals round after being 2nd in the general table. Unfortunately for Cholito, they lost on aggregate score to San Francisco. In August 2011 he became assistant to Miguel Mansilla at Chorrillo after he was dismissed as manager of the Panama U-20.

In May 2012 he returned at the helm at Atlético Chiriquí, only to resign in March 2013.
