= Dennis Purperhart =

Surinamese footballer

Personal information
- Date of birth: June 10, 1969 (age 57)
- Place of birth: Paramaribo, Suriname
- Position: Midfielder

Senior career*
Years	Team	Apps	(Gls)
1988–1990	HFC Haarlem	35	(1)
1990–1991	RKC Waalwijk	13	(0)
1991–1992	Heracles Almelo	33	(7)
1992–1993	TOP Oss	14	(3)
1996–1997	SV Robinhood	0	(0)
1999–2006	Amsterdamsche FC	0	(0)

International career
1996–2004	Suriname	4	(1)
- * Club domestic league appearances and goals

Dennis Purperhart (born June 10, 1969 in Paramaribo) is a Surinamese professional footballer who last played as midfielder for Amsterdamsche FC.
