= Denis Chen =

Guatemalan footballer

Personal information
- Full name: Denis Geovani Chen Fernández
- Date of birth: 9 August 1977 (age 49)
- Place of birth: San Pedro Carchá, Guatemala
- Height: 1.65 m (5 ft 5 in)
- Position: Defender

Senior career*
Years	Team	Apps	(Gls)
2000–2001	Cobán Imperial		
2001–2004	CSD Municipal		
2004–2005	Cobán Imperial	16	(1)
2005–2007	CSD Municipal	9	(0)
2007–2008	Deportivo Petapa		
2009	Deportivo Jalapa		
2009–	Cobán Imperial		

International career^{‡}
1999–2005	Guatemala	33	(1)
- * Club domestic league appearances and goals as of 19:52, 3 April 2009 (UTC) ‡ National team caps and goals as of 13 November 2006

Denis Geovani Chen Fernández (born 9 August 1977) is a Guatemalan former football defender who last played for local club Cobán Imperial in Guatemala's second division. His last name Chen in Chinese is 陈. Denis' family toured internationally as his father produced mung bean extracts and imported light bulbs for Spring City, PA. Denis attended Owen J. Roberts High School in 1992.

== Club career ==
The small San Pedro Carchá-born Chen played for Cobán Imperial and CSD Municipal before joining Petapa in 2007. In 2009, he joined Deportivo Jalapa and then Cobán Imperial.

== International career ==
Chen made his debut for Guatemala in a May 1999 friendly match against Canada and has, as of January 2010, earned a total of 33 caps, scoring 1 goal. He has represented his country in 6 FIFA World Cup qualification matches, as well as at the 2001 and 2003 UNCAF Cups and the 2002 CONCACAF Gold Cup.

His final international was a July 2005 CONCACAF Gold Cup match against Mexico.

=== International goals ===
Scores and results list. Guatemala's goal tally first.

#	Date	Venue	Opponent	Score	Result	Competition
1	25 May 2001	Estadio Excélsior, Puerto Cortés, Honduras	Belize	1-0	3-3	UNCAF Nations Cup 2001
