= Richard Rodríguez (footballer) =

Uruguayan footballer (born 1992)

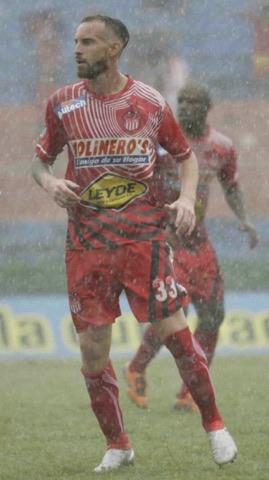
- Rodríguez with Vida in 2017

Personal information
- Full name: Richard Andrés Rodríguez Álvez
- Date of birth: 13 July 1992 (age 34)
- Place of birth: Toledo, Uruguay
- Height: 1.81 m (5 ft 11 in)
- Position: Defensive midfielder

Team information
- Current team: Diriangén
- Number: 17

Senior career*
Years	Team	Apps	(Gls)
2010–2014	Rentistas	33	(0)
2014–2015	Canadian	23	(0)
2015–2016	Platense	26	(1)
2016	Cerrito	11	(0)
2017	Vida	29	(2)
2018–2019	Real Estelí	59	(4)
2019	Deportivo Santaní	19	(0)
2020–2022	Real Estelí	95	(13)
2022–2023	Municipal Liberia		
2023	→ Diriangén (loan)	18	(1)
2024–	Diriangén	0	(0)

International career
2019–2022	Nicaragua	19	(1)
- * Club domestic league appearances and goals as of 17:09, 14 January 2024 (UTC)

Richard Andrés Rodríguez Álvez (born 13 July 1992) is a Uruguayan professional footballer who plays as a defensive midfielder for Liga Primera club Diriangén.

Although capped for the Nicaragua national team, he was later declared ineligible by CONCACAF.

== Career ==
Born and raised in Uruguay, he moved to Nicaragua for the first time in early 2018, when he joined Real Estelí FC. After just a season and a half playing for them and shortly after signing for Paraguayan club Deportivo Santaní, he was naturalized by Nicaragua and made his international debut on 5 September 2019.

== Career statistics ==
=== International ===
Appearances and goals by national team and year
National team	Year	Apps	Goals
Nicaragua	2019	6	0
Nicaragua	2020	3	0
Nicaragua	2021	7	1
Nicaragua	2022	3	0
Total		19	1

Scores and results list Nicaragua's goal tally first, score column indicates score after each Rodríguez goal.

List of international goals scored by Richard Rodríguez
No.	Date	Venue	Opponent	Score	Result	Competition
1	4 June 2021	Nicaragua National Football Stadium, Managua, Nicaragua	Belize	1–0	3–0	2022 FIFA World Cup qualification
