= Masatepe =

Masatepe Masātepēk
- Municipality
- Masatepe
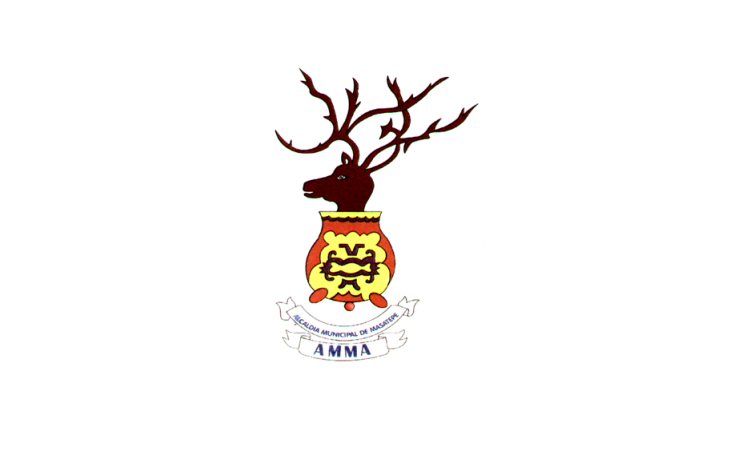
- Flag

- Location in Nicaragua
- Coordinates: 11°55′N 86°09′W
- Country: Nicaragua
- Department: Masaya

Area
  - Municipality: 22.9 sq mi (59.4 km^{2})
- Elevation: 1,558 ft (475 m)

Population (2022 estimate)
  - Municipality: 41,809
  - Density: 1,820/sq mi (704/km^{2})
  - Urban: 22,978
- Area code: 42600
- Climate: Aw

Masatepe (Nawat: Masātepēk), (Spanish pronunciation: [masaˈtepe]) is one of the nine municipalities of the Masaya Department in Nicaragua. It is located on the plateau of the villages 50 kilometers from Managua along the road to Masaya. It belongs to the tourist corridor of " Los Pueblos Blancos" on top of the coffee-producing Volcanic Plateau. The origin of the word "Masatepe" comes from the Nawat language and is named after the Nahua chiefdom of Masatepek, which was located in the present-day department of Masaya. Masatepek is a combination of the Nawat words Masat (deer), and -tepek (hill). The literal translation of Masatepek is "deer hill". The Indigenous inhabitants of Masaya are the Nahuas and the Chorotegas, and the Nahuas who still inhabit the municipality dominate the cocoa production in Masatepe.

== History and Etymology ==
The name Masatepe originates from the Nawat language, and is a combination of the Nawat words Masat (deer), and -tepek (hill). Therefore, the literal translation of Masatepek is "deer hill", and was named by the Nahuas in reference to the white-tailed deer that inhabit the region. In addition, Masatepek was a Nahua chiefdom located in what is now the Masaya department. The Nahuas of Masatepek inhabited Nindiri, Niquinohomo, Monimbó, and Masatepe, and coexisted with the Chorotegas who also inhabited Masaya, as well as Chibchan minorities who were assimilated into Nahua culture and society.

== Weather and Location ==
Masatepe is located on top of the Plateau of towns, at an altitude of 475m, the total area can be divided into two main different types of biomes:

1- Rain forest (Usually has native trees and Coffee Plantations. Elv: (400 - 500m)

2- Dry Valley. ( can be found near the coast of the Lagoon, and the Masaya Volcano ). Elv: (90 - 250m)

The temperature fluctuates during the year, being mostly warm. During the winter months (November - January) the temperatures become cooler, and there are usually foggy mornings.

Climate data for Masatepe (1971–1990)
Month	Jan	Feb	Mar	Apr	May	Jun	Jul	Aug	Sep	Oct	Nov	Dec	Year
Mean daily maximum °C (°F)	27.4 (81.3)	28.4 (83.1)	30.1 (86.2)	31.1 (88.0)	30.5 (86.9)	28.4 (83.1)	27.7 (81.9)	28.2 (82.8)	28.7 (83.7)	27.8 (82.0)	27.4 (81.3)	27.0 (80.6)	28.6 (83.5)
Daily mean °C (°F)	23.1 (73.6)	23.7 (74.7)	24.9 (76.8)	25.8 (78.4)	25.9 (78.6)	24.0 (75.2)	24.4 (75.9)	24.6 (76.3)	24.5 (76.1)	24.1 (75.4)	23.7 (74.7)	23.2 (73.8)	24.3 (75.7)
Mean daily minimum °C (°F)	18.8 (65.8)	18.9 (66.0)	18.4 (65.1)	20.4 (68.7)	21.1 (70.0)	21.0 (69.8)	20.0 (68.0)	20.9 (69.6)	20.7 (69.3)	20.4 (68.7)	20.4 (68.7)	19.4 (66.9)	20.0 (68.0)
Average precipitation mm (inches)	12 (0.5)	10 (0.4)	5 (0.2)	17 (0.7)	203 (8.0)	185 (7.3)	141 (5.6)	172 (6.8)	273 (10.7)	239 (9.4)	84 (3.3)	29 (1.1)	1,370 (53.9)
Average precipitation days (≥ 1.0 mm)	4	1	1	2	11	18	17	17	18	19	10	7	124
Source: National Oceanic and Atmospheric Administration

== Sports ==
The town is home of football club Deportivo Masatepe.
