= Carlos Alberto da Luz =

Brazilian football manager (1945–2019)

Personal information
- Full name: Carlos Alberto da Luz
- Date of birth: 1 May 1945
- Place of birth: Colatina, Brazil
- Date of death: 4 April 2019 (aged 73)
- Place of death: Nashville, Tennessee

Managerial career
- Years: Team
- 2002–2003: Panama

Carlos Alberto da Luz (1 May 1945 – 4 April 2019) was a Brazilian football manager.
