= Álvaro Jiménez (Guatemalan footballer) =

Guatemalan footballer

Personal information
- Full name: Álvaro José Jiménez Soto
- Date of birth: November 24, 1974 (age 51)
- Place of birth: Antigua Guatemala, Guatemala
- Height: 1.82 m (5 ft 11 1/2 in)
- Position: Defender

Senior career*
Years	Team	Apps	(Gls)
2000–2004	CSD Comunicaciones	25	(2)
2004–2006	Jalapa	72	(0)
2007	Deportivo Mictlán	13	(0)
2007–2009	Comunicaciones		
2009–present	Aurora F.C.		

International career^{‡}
1999–2006	Guatemala	25	(0)
- * Club domestic league appearances and goals as of 23 July 2010 ‡ National team caps and goals as of 23 July 2010

Álvaro José Jiménez Soto (born 24 November 1974) is a Guatemalan former football defender. He last played for Aurora F.C. in the Guatemalan second division.

== Club career ==
Jiménez had two spells at Guatemalan giants CSD Comunicaciones. He also played for Jalapa and had a short spell at Mictlán.

== International career ==
Jiménez made his debut for Guatemala in a February 1999 friendly match against Ecuador and has earned a total of 25 caps, scoring no goals. He did, however, score a goal in a non-official match against a Cameroun IX in January 2002. He has never represented his country in a FIFA World Cup qualification match but played at the 2001 and 2003 UNCAF Nations Cups, as well as at the 2002 CONCACAF Gold Cup.

Jiménez's final international was an October 2006 friendly match against Honduras.
