= Ricardo James =

Panamanian footballer (born 1966)

Personal information
- Full name: Ricardo Emir James Rayo
- Date of birth: May 7, 1966 (age 60)
- Place of birth: Bocas del Toro, Panama
- Height: 1.91 m (6 ft 3 in)
- Position: Goalkeeper

Senior career*
Years	Team	Apps	(Gls)
- Guabito de Bocas
1993–2005	Platense	123	(0)
2005–2007	Olimpia	127	(9)

International career^{‡}
1993–2004	Panama	43	(0)
- * Club domestic league appearances and goals as of 2006 ‡ National team caps and goals as of 2005

Ricardo Emir James Rayo (born May 7, 1966) is a Panamanian former footballer.

== Club career ==
James played for local side Guabito de Bocas but never in the ANAPROF league, since he spent most of his career in Honduras playing for Platense and Olimpia. He yielded a humorous goal to Wilmer Velásquez while playing for Platense in the 1998–99 season.

He retired aged 40, after winning a 5th Honduran league title with Olimpia.

== International career ==
James made his debut for Panama in a March 1993 UNCAF Nations Cup match against Honduras and has earned a total of 43 caps, scoring no goals. He represented his country in 17 FIFA World Cup qualification matches and played at the 1993 CONCACAF Gold Cup.

His final international was an August 2004 FIFA World Cup qualification match against El Salvador.

== Retirement ==
After retiring, James became goalkeeping coach at Platense and later Sporting San Miguelito.

== Honours and awards ==
=== Club ===
C.D. Platense

- Liga Nacional de Fútbol Profesional de Honduras (1): 2000–01
- Honduran Cup (2): 1996, 1997

C.D. Olimpia

- Liga Nacional de Fútbol Profesional de Honduras (2): 2005–06 A, 2005–06 C
