= Víctor René Mendieta (footballer, born 1982) =

Panamanian footballer

Personal information
- Full name: Víctor René Mendieta Sánchez
- Date of birth: 6 September 1982 (age 44)
- Place of birth: Panama City, Panama
- Height: 1.83 m (6 ft 0 in)
- Position: Striker

Team information
- Current team: Tauro

Senior career*
Years	Team	Apps	(Gls)
2000–2004	Alianza	70	(29)
2005	Deportes Quindío	14	(2)
2005–2006	San Francisco	40	(18)
2007	La Equidad	20	(5)
2007	Árabe Unido	22	(4)
2007	Santacruceña	17	(3)
2008	Tigres B	18	(5)
2008–2010	Árabe Unido	52	(20)
2011	Tauro	15	(5)
2012	Chorrillo		
2012	Plaza Amador	3	(0)
2013–2015	Chepo	64	(18)
2016	Tauro		
2017–	Bagoso FC		

International career^{‡}
2003	Panama	4	(1)
- * Club domestic league appearances and goals as of 31 July 2006 ‡ National team caps and goals as of 30 June 2015

Víctor René Mendieta Sánchez (born 6 September 1982) is a football striker who currently plays in Panama for team Bagoso FC.

== Club career ==
He started his career at Alianza, before moving abroad to play for Colombian side Deportes Quindío in December 2004. He returned to Panama after one season to play for San Francisco but made another move to Colombia when he signed for La Equidad. He then played for home side Árabe Unido before crossing borders again for a spell in Costa Rica with Santacruceña and later in Mexico with UANL Tigres Reserve team.

In January 2011, Mendieta joined Tauro from Árabe Unido, then moved to Chorrillo and he was included in Plaza Amador's squad for the 2012 Apertura season.

He joined Chepo in summer 2013.

== International career ==
Mendieta made his debut for Panama in a February 2003 UNCAF Nations Cup match against El Salvador and has earned a total of 4 caps, scoring 1 goal. He represented his country at the 2003 UNCAF Nations Cup.

His final international was a June 2003 friendly match against Cuba.

=== International goals ===
Scores and results list Panama's goal tally first.

#	Date	Venue	Opponent	Score	Result	Competition
1	18 February 2003	Estadio Rommel Fernández, Panama City, Panama	Honduras	1–1	1–1	2003 UNCAF Nations Cup

== Personal life ==
Mendieta is the son of former Panamanian international footballer Víctor René Mendieta Ocampo.

== Honors ==
=== Club ===
- Liga Panameña de Fútbol (1): 2008 (C)
- Liga Panameña de Fútbol: Apertura 2009 II
- ANAPROF (1): 2006
