= Diego Mejía (footballer, born 1982) =

Salvadoran footballer (born 1982)

Personal information
- Full name: Diego Armando Mejía Pérez
- Date of birth: June 20, 1982 (age 44)
- Place of birth: San Salvador, El Salvador
- Height: 1.83 m (6 ft 0 in)
- Position: Forward

Youth career
- Academia La Chelona

Senior career*
Years	Team	Apps	(Gls)
2000–2003	Alianza	50	(14)
2004	Motagua		(1)
2004–2006	Once Municipal		
2006	San Salvador F.C.		
2007	Cobras		
2008	Southern California Seahorses	11	(3)

International career^{‡}
2001–2004	El Salvador	19	(3)
- * Club domestic league appearances and goals as of 23 July 2008 ‡ National team caps and goals as of 16 July 2011

Diego Armando Mejía Pérez (born June 20, 1982 in San Salvador, El Salvador) is a retired Salvadoran footballer.

== Club career ==
Mejía came through the Chelona youth academy and had a couple of seasons at Alianza before moving abroad to play for Honduran giants F.C. Motagua. After six months he returned to El Salvador to play for Once Municipal and San Salvador F.C. In 2007, he joined Mexican side Cobras.

In December 2007, that was reported that Mejía would make a comeback to football after a year long injury had prevented him from taking part in competitive games at any level. He impressed during trials at both USL First Division side Carolina RailHawks, and USL Second Division side Real Maryland in the early part of 2008, but ultimately decided to sign with the PDL team, Southern California Seahorses in the fourth division Premier Development League. He scored three goals in 11 games for them.

== International career ==
With the El Salvador U-21 team, Mejía won the 2002 Central American and Caribbean Games.

He made his senior debut for El Salvador in a March 2001 friendly match against Panama and has earned a total of 19 caps, scoring 3 goals. He has represented his country in 3 FIFA World Cup qualification matches and played at the 2003 UNCAF Nations Cup as well as at the 2003 CONCACAF Gold Cup.

His final international game was a September 2004 World Cup qualification match against the United States.

=== International goals ===
Scores and results list El Salvador's goal tally first.

#	Date	Venue	Opponent	Score	Result	Competition
1	13 February 2003	Estadio Rommel Fernández, Panama City, Panama	Nicaragua	3-0	3-0	2003 UNCAF Nations Cup
2	29 June 2003	Estadio Nacional, San Pedro Sula, Honduras	Honduras	1-1	1-1	friendly match
3	6 July 2003	The Home Depot Center, Carson, United States	Mexico	1-0	2-1	friendly match

== Post-football ==
Mejía is now an athletic director in one of three FC Barcelona schools in Mexico, in the Chihuahua state.
