= Víctor Velásquez =

Salvadoran footballer (born 1976)

Personal information
- Full name: Victor Manuel Velasquez Molina
- Date of birth: April 12, 1976 (age 50)
- Place of birth: La Unión, El Salvador
- Height: 1.78 m (5 ft 10 in)
- Position: Defender

Senior career*
Years	Team	Apps	(Gls)
1996–2001	Dragón		
2001–2006	FAS	45	(4)
2006–2008	Alianza		
2008–2009	Águila	29	(1)
2009–2010	Municipal Limeño	34	(1)
2010–2011	FAS	2	(2)

International career^{‡}
1999–2007	El Salvador	54	(4)
- * Club domestic league appearances and goals as of August 6, 2010 ‡ National team caps and goals as of February 2007

Víctor Manuel Velásquez Molina (born April 12, 1976) is a retired Salvadoran football player.

== Club career ==
Velásquez started his career at Dragón in 1996 and left them after five years for Salvadoran giants FAS with whom he won five league titles. After another five years he moved to Alianza, only to join Águila in 2008. He then had a one-year spell with Municipal Limeño and rejoined FAS for a final season before retiring.

== International career ==
Velásquez made his debut for El Salvador in a May 1999 friendly match against Colombia and has earned a total of 54 caps, scoring 4 goals. He has represented his country in 10 FIFA World Cup qualification matches and played at the 2001, 2003, 2005 and 2007 UNCAF Nations Cups as well as at the 2002 and 2003 CONCACAF Gold Cups.

His final international game was a February 2007 UNCAF Nations Cup match against Guatemala.

=== International goals ===
Scores and results list El Salvador's goal tally first.

#	Date	Venue	Opponent	Score	Result	Competition
1	13 February 2003	Estadio Rommel Fernández, Panama City, Panama	Nicaragua	2-0	3-0	2003 UNCAF Nations Cup
2	28 January 2004	Estadio Cuscatlán, San Salvador, El Salvador	Panama	1-1	1-1	Friendly match
3	13 June 2004	Estadio Cuscatlán, San Salvador, El Salvador	Bermuda	2-1	2-1	2006 FIFA World Cup qualification
4	18 August 2004	Estadio Cuscatlán, San Salvador, El Salvador	Panama	1-0	2-1	2006 FIFA World Cup qualification
