= Neftalí Díaz =

Panamanian footballer (born 1971)

Personal information
- Full name: Neftalí Díaz Cajar
- Date of birth: December 15, 1971 (age 54)
- Place of birth: Panama City, Panama
- Position: Striker

Senior career*
Years	Team	Apps	(Gls)
1989–1999	Euro Kickers		
- Bella Vista
- Basáñez
1997	FAS		
2000	Primavera de Veraguas		
2000–2001	Atlético Nacional		
2001	San Francisco		
2002	Atlético Veragüense		(4)
2002–2004	San Francisco		
2005–2007	Alianza		
2008	Atlético Veragüense		

International career^{‡}
1992–2005	Panama	44	(7)
- * Club domestic league appearances and goals ‡ National team caps and goals as of 15 August 2015

Neftalí Díaz Cajar (born 15 December 1971 in Panama City) is a Panamanian retired football forward.

== Club career ==
Díaz started his career at Euro Kickers, where he formed a lethal strike duo with José "Chepe" Ardines. In January 1997 he moved abroad to play for Salvadoran side FAS. He also had spells in Uruguay with Bella Vista and Basáñez. Nicknamed Poeta de la Zurda, Díaz returned to San Francisco in summer 2002 after scoring 4 goals in a season at Atlético Veragüense.

He returned to Veragüense in February 2008.

== International career ==
Díaz made his debut for Panama in a June 1992 friendly match against Honduras and has earned a total of 44 caps, scoring 7 goals. He represented his country in 6 FIFA World Cup qualification matches and played at the 1993 CONCACAF Gold Cup.

His final international was a May 2005 friendly match against Venezuela.

== Managerial career ==
In September 2012, he was appointed assistant to new manager José Anthony Torres at Sporting San Miguelito.

== Personal life ==
Díaz's son Érick Díaz is also a professional footballer and Panama international.
