= Scorpión FC =

Nicaraguan football club

- Full name: Scorpión FC
- Ground: Colegio San Luís; Chinandega, Nicaragua
- Chairman: Luis Chavarria
Home colours

Scorpión FC is a Nicaraguan football team.

It is based in Chinandega.

== History ==
In summer 2004 Scorpión was promoted to Nicaragua's second division. They played in the Primera División de Nicaragua in 2006/07 but encountered financial problems and were relegated in the end of the season and demoted to the Third Division since they failed to show up for two league games.

== Notable coaches ==
- (Nicaragua) Eduardo Alonso (2004)
- (Argentina) Carlos Sánchez
- (Nicaragua) Martín Mena
