= Deportivo Bluefields =

Nicaraguan football club

- Full name: Deportivo Bluefields
- Founded: 1997
- Ground: Estadio Glorias Costeñas; Bluefields, Nicaragua
- Capacity: 4,000
- Chairman: José Tenorio

Deportivo Bluefields is a Nicaraguan football team.

Based in Bluefields at the country's Caribbean coast, the club has played in the Nicaraguan Premier Division, their most recent the 2008−09 season.

Despite its economic difficulties it features a talented squad, and many of the star players in Nicaragua's top clubs like Real Esteli or Diriangen began their career at Bluefields.

== Coaches ==
- (Uruguay) José Nelson Lima (2006)
