= Emilio Palacios =

Nicaraguan former footballer (born 1982)

Personal information
- Full name: Emilio José Palacios Luna
- Date of birth: 8 October 1982 (age 44)
- Place of birth: Carazo Department, Nicaragua
- Height: 1.74 m (5 ft 8 1/2 in)
- Position: Striker

Senior career*
Years	Team	Apps	(Gls)
1999–2002	Diriangén		(26)
2002–2003	Parmalat		(31)
2003–2006	Diriangén		(42)
2007	Independiente		(0)
2007–2008	Walter Ferretti		(15)
2008–2012	Xilotepelt		(47)
2012–2014	Diriangén		(26)
2014–2015	UNAN Managua	16	(6)
2015–2016	Diriangén	14	(0)
2016–2017	Managua FC	0	(0)

International career
2001–2009	Nicaragua	26	(11)
- * Club domestic league appearances and goals

Emilio José Palacios Luna (born 8 October 1982) is a Nicaraguan former footballer who played for Diriangén in the Primera División de Nicaragua.

Palacios is Nicaragua's all-time national team record goalscorer with 11 goals.

== Club career ==
Palacios started his professional career at Diriangén and had a short spell with Parmalat. He moved abroad to join Salvadoran outfit Independiente in 2007, only to return to Nicaragua to play for Walter Ferretti, then Xilotepelt, whom he helped promote to the top tier in June 2012. He returned to Diriangén in the summer of 2012.

He was the top scorer of the Nicaraguan League in the championships Apertura 2002 (scoring 15 goals for Parmalat), Apertura 2003 (17 goals for Diriangén), and Apertura 2004 (14 goals for Diriangén).

== International career ==
Palacios made his debut for Nicaragua in an April 2001 friendly match against Belize and has earned a total of 26 caps, scoring 11 goals. He has represented his country in 3 FIFA World Cup qualification matches and played at the 2001, 2003, 2007, and 2009 UNCAF Nations Cups.

He was the first Nicaraguan to score a hat-trick in an international competition in February 2007, when Nicaragua won 4-2 against Belize during the IX UNCAF Copa de Naciones. After a good performance in this event, he was contacted by Salvadoran side Independiente and left Diriangen FC for the Salvadoran side.

His final international was a January 2009 UNCAF Nations Cup match against Guatemala.

=== International goals ===
Scores and results list Honduras' goal tally first.

N.	Date	Venue	Opponent	Score	Result	Competition
1.	17 November 2002	Truman Bodden Sports Complex, George Town, Cayman Islands	Cayman Islands	1–0	1–0	Friendly match
2.	21 February 2003	Estadio Rommel Fernández, Panama City, Panama	Panama	1–0	1–0	2003 UNCAF Nations Cup
3.	31 January 2004	John Leonard Stadium, West Palm Beach, United States	Haiti	1–0	1–1	Friendly match
4.	2 April 2004	Bermuda National Stadium, Hamilton, Bermuda	Bermuda	1–2	1–2	Friendly match
5.	30 April 2004	Estadio Cacique Diriangén, Diriamba, Nicaragua	Bermuda	2–0	2–0	Friendly match
6.	2 May 2004	Estadio Independencia, Estelí, Nicaragua	Bermuda	2–0	2–0	Friendly match
7.	13 June 2004	Estadio Cacique Diriangén, Diriamba, Nicaragua	Saint Vincent and the Grenadines	1–1	2–2	2006 FIFA World Cup qualification
8.	20 June 2004	Arnos Vale Stadium, Kingstown, Saint Vincent and the Grenadines	Saint Vincent and the Grenadines	1–2	1–4	2006 FIFA World Cup qualification
9.	12 February 2007	Estadio Cuscatlán, San Salvador, El Salvador	Belize	1–0	4–2	2007 UNCAF Nations Cup
10.	12 February 2007	Estadio Cuscatlán, San Salvador, El Salvador	Belize	2–0	4–2	2007 UNCAF Nations Cup
11.	12 February 2007	Estadio Cuscatlán, San Salvador, El Salvador	Belize	4–2	4–2	2007 UNCAF Nations Cup
Correct as of 21 January 2017
