= CD Walter Ferretti =

Association football club in Nicaragua

Walter Ferretti
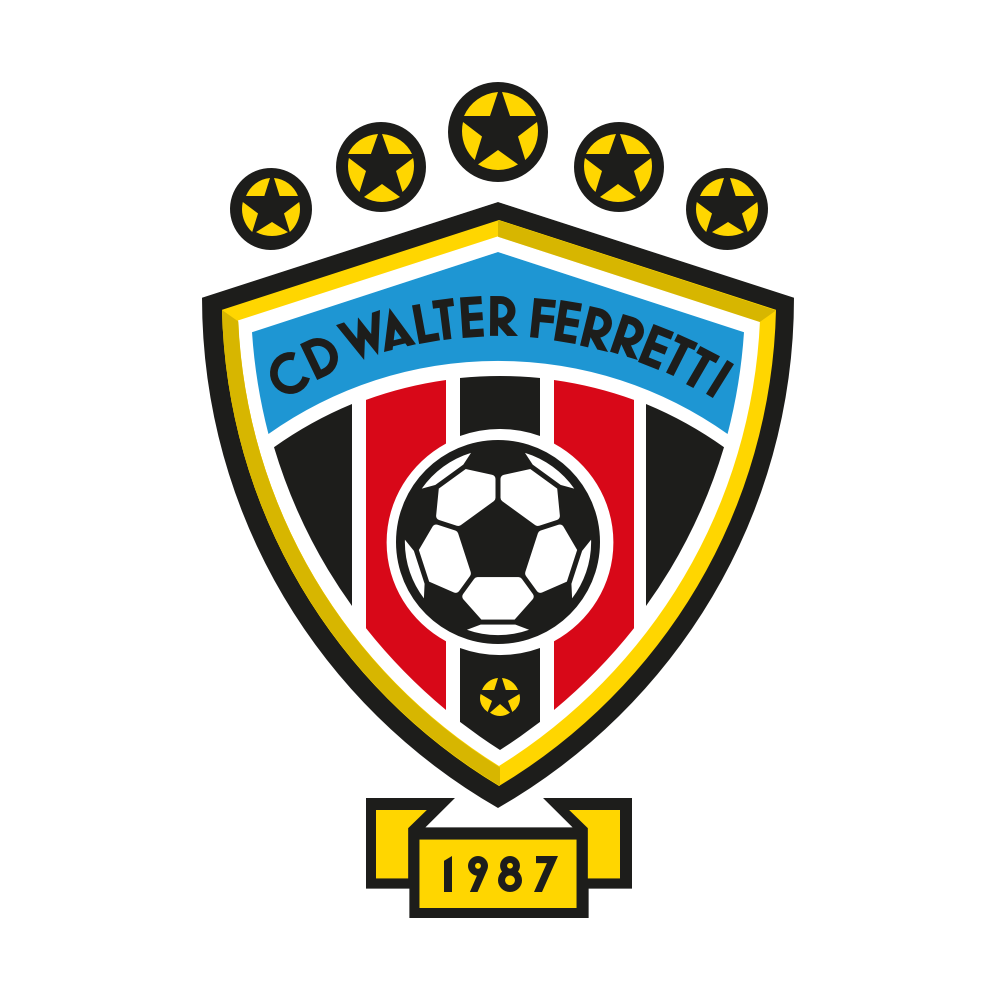
- Full name: Club Deportivo Walter Ferretti
- Nicknames: Los Rojinegros; Los Policías
- Founded: 1984; 42 years ago as DGPS (Dirección General de La Polícia Sandinista)
- Ground: Estadio Olímpico del IND Managua
- Capacity: 10,000
- Chairman: Carlos Palacios
- Manager: Mauricio Cruz Jiron
- League: Liga Primera
- 2024–25: TBA
Home colours	Away colours

Club Deportivo Walter Ferretti is a Nicaraguan football team who play in the Nicaraguan Premier Division. They are based in Managua.

== History ==
The club was founded in 1984 on the initiative of Walter Ferretti Fonseca. Its intention was to serve as the sporting wing of the Sandinista Police, and it initially competed in an institutional league for government ministries. Later, the team moved into the Nicaraguan league system. At that time, they competed under the name of DGPS (Dirección General de La Polícia Sandinista). DGPS stormed through the lower levels of the Nicaraguan league system, winning the Second Division in 1985 with an undefeated record. That lifted them to the top flight of the country, where they have competed ever since.

Late in 1988, Ferretti died in a car accident on the road to Leon. In 1991, the club was renamed to C.D. Walter Ferretti in his honor.

The 1997–98 season saw Ferretti win its first ever title, defeating Masachapa 1–0 in the championship final. They reached the finals again in 1999–2000, losing in extra time to Diriangén. The next year, 2000–2001, saw them go win better and claim a second championship. It came against Diriangén, and after two scoreless legs Ferretti won on penalties, 5–3. Ferretti made it to the finals for a third consecutive year in 2002, but was run off the pitch by Jalapa, 4–1.

The club made no serious noise again until Clausura 2008, when they reached another final, this time facing Real Estelí. Both legs of the two-legged tie were scoreless, so the match went into extra time. Real Estelí ended up winning on a 115th-minute goal by Elmer Mejia. They reached the finals again in Clausura 2009, beating Diriangén on penalties before losing 3–1 on aggregate to Real Estelí.

The championship-less string finally ended in Apertura 2009. Ferretti was the dominant team in Nicaragua that year, topping the table in the first and second phases to reach the championship finals. Real Estelí won the first leg 1–0, and scored first in the second leg to build a 2–0 aggregate lead. Then Ferretti unleashed a torrent of goals, rallying to win the match 4–1 and the tie 4–2.

Ferretti's surge continued into the Clausura 2010, as they reached the finals again, only to lose 1–1 on away goals to Real Estelí. The two met again that May for the Grand Final to determine the 2009–2010 champion; Real Estelí won once again on away goals.

The next year, 2010–2011, saw Ferretti win the Apertura 2–2 on away goals against Diriangén. However, their quest to be grand champions came up short a second year in a row; they lost the Clausura final 3–2 to Real Estelí, and were beaten on penalties by the same team in the Grand Final.

Real Estelí's hold on Ferretti continued, as the Nicaraguan power beat them in the Apertura 2011, Apertura 2012, Clausura 2013 (that match was called early due to crowd trouble in the Ferretti stands) and Apertura 2013. The curse was finally lifted in the 2014 Apertura, when Ferretti prevailed 1–0 on aggregate to hoist their first crown since Apertura 2011. Then, in the Grand Final, Ferretti finally ended Real Estelí's string of eight consecutive Nicaraguan championships with a 2–1 aggregate win.

Real Estelí came back to win the next two titles, and beat Ferretti in the 2016 Clausura and the 2017 Clausura. However, Ferretti rallied for a fourth crown in 2017–2018, beating Managua 1–1 in the Apertura.

== Logo ==
Original Deportivo Walter Ferretti crest
(1988–2002)

(2002–2014)

(2015–present)

== Achievements ==
=== Achievements ===
- Primera División de Nicaragua and predecessors
  - Champions (4): 1997−98, 2000−01, 2014−15, 2017 Apertura
- Copa de Nicaragua and predecessors
  - Champions (2): 2021, 2022

=== Friendly ===
- I Copa UCEM : 1
- (gold) (1) – :: 2013

== Records ==
Walter Ferretti biggest league victory was 11–0 against Pinares in the 1997 Season.

=== Record versus other nations' clubs ===
As of 2018-12-17

The Concacaf opponents below = Official tournament results: (Plus a sampling of other results)

Opponent	Last Meeting	G	W	D	L	F	A	PTS	+/-
(Guatemala) Aurora	March 7, 1999	1	0	0	1	0	8	0	-8
(El Salvador) FAS	Feb 28, 1999	1	1	0	0	2	1	3	1
(Belize) Real Verdes	Feb 21, 1999	1	1	0	0	1	0	3	1
(Honduras) C.D. Motagua	2015	2	0	0	2	1	4	0	-3
(Mexico) Club America	2015	2	0	0	2	1	4	0	-3
(Belize) Belmopan Bandits	2017	2	2	0	0	5	1	6	+4
(Panama) Plaza Amador	2017	2	0	1	1	1	2	1	-1
(Martinique) Club Franciscain	2018	2	1	0	1	1	1	3	0
(Panama) Tauro	2018	2	0	0	2	1	7	0	-6
Totals									

- Henry Huesito Urbina (108 goals)

== Players ==
=== Current squad ===
As of 25 July, 2026 Note: Flags indicate national team as defined under FIFA eligibility rules; some limited exceptions apply. Players may hold more than one non-FIFA nationality.

No.	Pos.	Nation	Player
1	GK	NCA	Christian Cerpa
2	DF	NCA	Maverick Boza
3	MF	NCA	Andrew Legall
5	MF	NCA	Nahum Peralta
6	MF	NCA	Tulio López
7	MF	NCA	Jehu Flores
8	MF	NCA	Jareck Cáceres
9	FW	BRA	Marcos Gabriel
10	MF	NCA	Renato Punyed
11	FW	NCA	Brayan Lopez
12	FW	NCA	Bryan Astua
13	MF	NCA	Miguel Pacheco
15	DF	CRC	Sheldon Harris

No.	Pos.	Nation	Player
16	FW	NCA	Maynor Rivera
17	DF	NCA	Ronny Talavera
18	FW	PAN	Omar Hinestroza
20	MF	NCA	Richard Rodriguez
21	FW	NCA	Jorge Betancur
22	DF	NCA	Camphers Pérez
24	GK	NCA	Huberts Ibarra
25	GK	NCA	Esdras González
26	DF	NCA	Francisco Vallecillo
27	FW	NCA	Franklin Torres
28	MF	NCA	Eddy Nicoya
45	MF	NCA	Engel Pérez
59	MF	NCA	Jhonny Escobar
—	MF	COL	Juan Riascos

=== Players with dual citizenship ===
- (Nicaragua) (Costa Rica) Sheldon Harris
- (Nicaragua) (Costa Rica) Brayan Lopez
- (Nicaragua) (Uruguay) Richard Rodriguez

=== Out on loan ===
Note: Flags indicate national team as defined under FIFA eligibility rules; some limited exceptions apply. Players may hold more than one non-FIFA nationality.

No.	Pos.	Nation	Player
—		NCA	Jason Ingram (at UNAN Managua for the 2025-26 Seasons)
—	DF	NCA	Juan Carlos Amador (at Real Estelí for the 2025-26 Seasons)
—		NCA	TBD (at TBD for the 2025-26 Seasons)

=== In ===
Note: Flags indicate national team as defined under FIFA eligibility rules; some limited exceptions apply. Players may hold more than one non-FIFA nationality.

No.	Pos.	Nation	Player
—		NCA	Richard Rodriguez (From TBD)
—		NCA	Brayan López (From Guadalupe FC)
—		PAN	Sergio Cunningham (From TBD)
—		BRA	Marcos Gabriel (From São Raimundo-RR)

No.	Pos.	Nation	Player
—		NCA	Eddy Nicoya (From CS Sebaco)
—		NCA	Maynor Rivera (From Masaya)
—		NCA	TBD (From TBD)

=== Out ===
Note: Flags indicate national team as defined under FIFA eligibility rules; some limited exceptions apply. Players may hold more than one non-FIFA nationality.

No.	Pos.	Nation	Player
—		NCA	Norlan Cuadra (To TBD)
—		CRC	Juwan Brown (To Pitbulls FC)
—		BRA	Lucas dos Santos (To TBD)
—		NCA	Brayan Marín (To TBD)

No.	Pos.	Nation	Player
—		PAN	Luis Cañate (To Mictlán)
—		URU	Federico Moreira (To Boca Juniors Melo)
—		PAR	Claudio Araujo (To Paraguari AC)
—		NCA	TBD (To TBD)

== Coaching staff ==
As of June 2026

Position	Staff
Manager	(Honduras) José Valladares
Assistant Manager	(Nicaragua) Oscar Blanco
Assistant Manager	(Nicaragua) Miguel Angel Masis
Physical coach	(Nicaragua) Jorge Isac
Goalkeeper Coach	(Nicaragua) Maximo Iznaga
Physiotherapist	(Nicaragua) Alba Esther Hernandez
Utilero	(Nicaragua) Pedro Vallejos
Team Doctor	(Nicaragua) Jymmi Lopez
Under 20 coach	(Nicaragua) Marcos Méndez
Under 20 Assistant coach	(Nicaragua) Miguel Masis

== List of notable players ==
Note: this list includes players that have appeared in at least 100 league games and/or have reached international national team.

- (Nicaragua) Denis Espinoza (2008–2024)
- (Nicaragua) Joel Obando (2024–2025)
- (Nicaragua) Norlan Cuadra (2016–2017; 2025)
- (Nicaragua) Nahúm Peralta (2025–Present)
- (Nicaragua) (Colombia) Jorge Betancur (2023–2025)
- (Panama) Luis Cañate (2024–Present)
- (Nicaragua) Jason Ingram (2023–Present)
- (Nicaragua) Brandon Ayerdis (2024)
- (Nicaragua) Dshon Forbes (2019–2022; 2024)
- (Nicaragua) Edgar Castillo (2022–2023; 2024)
- (Nicaragua) Steven Cáceres (2021-2023)
- (Nicaragua) Junior Arteaga (2023)
- (Nicaragua) Alexis Somarriba (2020–2023)
- (Nicaragua) Danilo Zúñiga (2016-2018; 2022–2023)
- (Nicaragua) Ezequiel Ugalde (2019–2023)
- (Nicaragua) Alejandro Tapia (2014–2022)
- (Nicaragua) Jason Castellón (2017–2022)
- (Nicaragua) Jonathan Moncada (2020–2022)
- (Nicaragua) Bismarck Montiel (2021–2022)
- (Nicaragua) Bancy Hernández (2021–2022)
- (Nicaragua) Bryan García (2019–2022)
- (Nicaragua) Luis López (2021)
- (Nicaragua) Henry Niño (2019–2020; 2021)
- (Nicaragua) Marvin Fletes (2020)
- (Nicaragua) Melvin Hernández (2016; 2020)
- (Nicaragua) René Huete (2017–2020)
- (Nicaragua) Cristhian Flores (2017–2020)
- (Nicaragua) Anderson Treminio (2020)
- (Nicaragua) Daniel Reyes (2013–2014; 2019)
- (Nicaragua) Nasser Valverde (2019)
- (Nicaragua) Jeffrey Chávez (2017–2019)
- (Nicaragua) Manuel Gutiérrez (2015;2018–2019)
- (Nicaragua) Jessie López (2014–2018)
- (Nicaragua) Jorge Ellis (2018)
- (Nicaragua) Marcos Méndez (2017-2018)
- (Nicaragua) Maykel Montiel (2018)
- (Nicaragua) Carlos Guardado (2018)
- (Nicaragua) Samuel Wilson (2018)
- (Nicaragua) Ervin Aguirre (2018)
- (Nicaragua) Norfran Lazo (2011–2012; 2018)
- (Nicaragua) Cristián Gutierrez (2017)
- (Nicaragua) Carlos Membreño (2016–2017)
- (Nicaragua) Jorge García (2016–2017)
- (Nicaragua) Érick Lazo (2016–2017)
- (Nicaragua) Donald Parrales (2011–2016)
- (Nicaragua) Luis Peralta (2015–2016)
- (Nicaragua) Axel Villanueva (2010–2016)
- (Nicaragua) Javier Dolmus (2013–2016)
- (Nicaragua) Eulises Pavón (2015–2016)
- (Nicaragua) Ulises Rayo (2016)
- (Nicaragua) Jason Casco (2014–2015)
- (Nicaragua) (Colombia) Luis Copete (2013–2015)
- (Nicaragua) (Spain) Daniel Cadena (2013–2015)
- (Nicaragua) (Panama) Raúl Leguías (2014–2015)
- (Nicaragua) Medardo Martínez (2009–2012; 2014–2015)
- (Nicaragua) Josué Quijano (2011–2014)
- (Nicaragua) Ismael Reyes (2010–2014)
- (Nicaragua) Juan Carlos Rosales (2013–2014)
- (Nicaragua) Remy Vanegas (2013)
- (Nicaragua) Silvio Avilés (2007–2012)
- (Nicaragua) Mario Gastón (2007–2012)
- (Nicaragua) Roger Mejia (2009–2012)
- (Nicaragua) José Carballo (2009–2012)
- (Nicaragua) Eustace Martín (2007–2012)
- (Nicaragua) Félix Zeledón (2011)
- (Nicaragua) Érick Vallecillo (2008–2011)
- (Nicaragua) Quesler Rizo (2011)
- (Nicaragua) Juan Barrera (2008–2010)
- (Nicaragua) Jaime Ruíz (2009)
- (Nicaragua) Miguel Ángel Masís (2007–2009)
- (Nicaragua) Wilber Sánchez (2001–2003; 2008–2009)
- (Nicaragua) Emilio Palacios (2007)
- (Nicaragua) Elvis Balladares (2000–2003; 2005–2006)
- (Nicaragua) José 'Chema' Bermúdez (1997; 2001; 2005)
- (Nicaragua) Clarence Martínez (2000–2005)
- (Nicaragua) Milton Busto (2001; 2003)
- (Nicaragua) Tyron Acevedo (2001–2003)
- (Nicaragua) Sergio Molina (1998)
- (Nicaragua) Livio Bendaña (1993; 1996–1998)
- (Nicaragua) Carlos Alonso (1996–1997)
- (Nicaragua) Cesar Rostrán (1996)
- (Nicaragua) Edward Urroz (1996)
- (Nicaragua) Eitel González (1992–1994)
- (Nicaragua) Normán González (1994)
- (Nicaragua) Humberto Sánchez (1994)
- (Nicaragua) José Zambrano (1993)
- (Nicaragua) Sergio Chamorro (1990–1992)
- (Nicaragua) Antonio González (1992)

== List of coaches ==
- (Nicaragua) Salvador Dubois (1987)
- (Honduras) Roy Posas (1996)
- (El Salvador) Carlos "Chicharrón" Aguilar (1998–1999)
- (Nicaragua) Alberto Vásquez (2001–2003)
- (Colombia) Edison Oquendo (2002)
- (Nicaragua) Omar Zambrana (2004–2005)
- (El Salvador) Carlos "Chicharrón" Aguilar (2007)
- (Nicaragua) Róger "Pinocho" Rodriguez (2007–2008)
- (Nicaragua) Omar Zambrana (2008 – September 2009)
- (Honduras) Rafael "Paciencia" Núñez (January 2009 – April 2009)
- (Honduras) José Valladares (August 2009 – August 2011)
- (Nicaragua) Henry "Huesito" Urbina (August 2011 – March 2013)
- (Nicaragua) Luis Gaucho Diaz (March 2013 – June 2013)
- (Nicaragua) Florencio Leiva (June 2013 – May 2014)
- (Brazil) Flavio Da Silva (June 2014 – September 2015)
- (Costa Rica) Marvin Solano (September 2015 – December 2015)
- (Honduras) José Valladares (December 2015 – August 2016)
- (Brazil) Flavio Da Silva (August 2016 – June 2018)
- (Nicaragua) Henry "Huesito" Urbina (July 2018– February 2022)
- (Nicaragua) Luis Gonzales (February 2022 – November 2023)
- (Costa Rica) Glen Blanco (November 2023 – September 2024)
- (Nicaragua) Mauricio Cruz (September 2024 - May 2025)
- (Nicaragua) Sting Lopez (May 2025 - June 2026)
- (Honduras) José Valladares (June 2026 - Present)

=== Notable managers ===
The following managers have won at least one trophy while in charge at Walter Ferretti:

Name	Nationality	From	To	Honours
Carlos "Chicharrón" Aguilar	El Salvador	1 June 1997	21 October 1999	1 Liga Nicaragua (1997-1998)
Alberto Vásquez	Nicaragua	1 June 2000	21 October 2003	1 Liga Nicaragua (2000-2001)
Flavio Da Silva	Brazil	1 June 2014; 1 August 2016	21 September 2015; 21 June 2018	2 Liga Nicaragua (2014 Apertura; 2017 Apertura)
