= Deportivo Masatepe =

Nicaraguan football club

- Full name: Deportivo Masatepe
- Nickname(s): Los Venados (The Deer)
- Ground: Estádio José Ernesto Sanchez; Masatepe, Nicaragua
- Capacity: 2,000
- Chairman: José Ernesto Sanchéz
Home colours

Deportivo Masatepe is a Nicaraguan football team.

== History ==
Based in Masatepe, they finally opened their own stadium in summer 2008 after having staged home games in the Estadio Olímpico de San Marcos and Estadio Cacique Diriangén in the seasons before.

They played their last season in the Nicaraguan Premier Division in the 2008/09 season after winning promotion in summer 2003.

== Achievements ==
- Copa de Nicaragua: 1
  2005

== List of managers ==
- (Honduras) Martín Mena (2004)
- (Costa Rica) Glen Blanco (2005–2006)
- (Honduras) Edward Urroz (2008)
