= 2003 UNCAF Nations Cup =

Tournament details
- Host country: Panama
- Dates: 9–27 February 2003
- Teams: 6 (from 1 sub-confederation)
- Venue: 2 (in 2 host cities)

Final positions
- Champions: Costa Rica (4th title)
- Runners-up: Guatemala
- Third place: El Salvador
- Fourth place: Honduras

Tournament statistics
- Matches played: 15
- Goals scored: 30 (2 per match)
- Top scorer(s): (Guatemala) Freddy García (Guatemala) Carlos Ruiz (3 goals each)

The 2003 UNCAF Nations Cup was an association football tournament. It was held in two venues in Panama in February 2003, and was played in a round robin tournament, each of the 6 teams playing each other once. Costa Rica won their record fourth title, and along with the Guatemala, El Salvador, and Honduras, qualified to the 2003 CONCACAF Gold Cup.

== Participating teams ==
6 UNCAF teams participated on the tournament

- Costa Rica
- El Salvador
- Guatemala (Defending Champions)
- Honduras
- Nicaragua
- Panama (Hosts)

Belize Did not enter the tournament

== Squads ==
For a complete list of all participating squads see UNCAF Nations Cup 2003 squads

== Venue ==
All matches were played at Estadio Rommel Fernández in Panama City.

2003 UNCAF Nations Cup is located in Panama	Panama City
2003 UNCAF Nations Cup is located in Panama	Estadio Rommel Fernández
2003 UNCAF Nations Cup is located in Panama	Capacity: 32,000

== Final round ==
=== Standings ===
Pos	Team	Pld	W	D	L	GF	GA	GD	Pts	Qualification
1	Costa Rica (C)	5	4	1	0	5	1	+4	13	2003 CONCACAF Gold Cup
2	Guatemala	5	3	1	1	10	4	+6	10	2003 CONCACAF Gold Cup
3	El Salvador	5	3	0	2	6	4	+2	9	2003 CONCACAF Gold Cup
4	Honduras	5	1	1	3	4	5	−1	4	2003 CONCACAF Gold Cup qualifying round
5	Panama	5	1	1	3	4	5	−1	4	
6	Nicaragua	5	1	0	4	1	11	−10	3	

(C) Champions
9 February 2003

Panama	1–2	El Salvador
Díaz 34'		Galdámez 70'; Corrales 77'

Estadio Rommel Fernández, Panama City

11 February 2003

Costa Rica	1–0	El Salvador
Scott 62'

Estadio Rommel Fernández, Panama City
11 February 2003

Honduras	2–0	Nicaragua
Martínez 4' de León 20'

Estadio Rommel Fernández, Panama City

13 February 2003

Costa Rica	1–1	Guatemala
Centeno 24' (pen.)		García 48'

Estadio Rommel Fernández, Panama City
13 February 2003

El Salvador	3–0	Nicaragua
Corrales 5'; Velásquez 27'; Mejía 89'

Estadio Rommel Fernández, Panama City

15 February 2003

Costa Rica	1–0	Nicaragua
Scott 16'

Estadio Armando Dely Valdés, Colón
15 February 2003

Honduras	0–1	El Salvador
		Murgas 81'

Estadio Armando Dely Valdés, Colón

16 February 2003

Panama	2–0	Guatemala
Méndez 29'; Brown 36'

Estadio Rommel Fernández, Panama City

18 February 2003

Guatemala	5–0	Nicaragua
Ruiz 33', 45', 66'; García 77'; Figueroa 81'

Estadio Rommel Fernández, Panama City
18 February 2003

Panama	1–1	Honduras
Mendieta 60'		Martínez 28'

Estadio Rommel Fernández, Panama City

20 February 2003

Costa Rica	1–0	Honduras
Bryce 45+2'

Estadio Rommel Fernández, Panama City
20 February 2003

El Salvador	0–2	Guatemala
		Alegría 18'; García 83' (pen.)

Estadio Rommel Fernández, Panama City

21 February 2003

Panama	0–1	Nicaragua
		Palacios 83'

Estadio Rommel Fernández, Panama City

23 February 2003

Honduras	1–2	Guatemala
Guevara 76'		Ramírez 7'; Figueroa 56'

Estadio Rommel Fernández, Panama City
23 February 2003

Panama	0–1	Costa Rica
		Solís 73'

Estadio Rommel Fernández, Panama City

== Awards ==
2003 UNCAF Nations Cup winner

Costa Rica
Fourth title

- Costa Rica, Guatemala and El Salvador qualified for 2003 CONCACAF Gold Cup finals. Honduras won drawing of lots to finish in fourth place, and therefore qualify for playoff against second-placed teams in Caribbean section.

== Goalscorers ==
3 goals

- (Guatemala) Freddy García
- (Guatemala) Carlos Ruiz

2 goals

- (Costa Rica) Walter Centeno
- (Costa Rica) Erick Scott
- (El Salvador) Rudis Corrales
- (Guatemala) Carlos Figueroa
- (Honduras) Jairo Martínez

1 goal

- (Costa Rica) Steven Bryce
- (Costa Rica) Alonso Solís
- (El Salvador) Josué Galdámez
- (El Salvador) Diego Mejía
- (El Salvador) Víctor Velásquez
- (Guatemala) César Alegría
- (Guatemala) Guillermo Ramírez
- (Honduras) Amado Guevara
- (Honduras) Julio César de León
- (Honduras) Gilberto Murgas
- (Nicaragua) Emilio Palacios
- (Panama) Roberto Brown
- (Panama) Neftalí Díaz
- (Panama) Mario Méndez
- (Panama) Víctor René Mendieta, Jr.
