= Parmalat FC =

Parmalat
- Full name: Parmalat Fútbol Club
- Founded: 15 March 2000
- Dissolved: 2005
- Ground: Managua, Nicaragua
- Chairman: Aldo Camorani
- Manager: Mauricio Batistini
- League: Primera División de Nicaragua
- 2004/2005 (last season): 10th, Primera División de Nicaragua

Parmalat Fútbol Club was a Nicaraguan football team that played at the top level. It is based in Managua. They played several seasons in the Primera División de Nicaragua however in the 2004 season the club were folded after suffering from severe financial difficulties.

== History ==
Parmalat Fútbol Club was founded on 15 March 2000, by Doctor Aldo Camorani (then president of Parmalat) who named them after the company he worked for They hired Róger "Pinocho" Rodríguez as coach and made their debut in the Nicaraguan Third Division on 4 June 2000 defeating Matagalpa 2–1 and after signing several promising under 20 Nicaragua national football team (Denis Rocha, Tyrone Acevedo, Javier Solórzano, Franklin López, Emilio Palacios and Mario Morale) and this enabled them to win the Nicaraguan Third Division in their very first season in 2000. After being promoted to the segunda division in 2001, Parmalat manage to win the title in their very first attempt and were promoted to the first division for the 2002 season. For the 2003, Parmalat hired Italian Mauricio Battistini to coach the team and he also accepted the national team job as well and would help the team reach the semi-finals for two seasons before he left the club to coach in Switzerland . However Parmalat due to financial trouble in 2005 decided to stop their ownership of the football club and the club ceased to exist.

== Honours ==
- Segunda Division: 1

2002

- Tercera Division: 1

2001

== List of coaches ==
- (Nicaragua) Róger "Pinocho" Rodríguez (2001–2002)
- (Italy) Mauricio Batistini (2003–2004)
