= 2013–14 Primera División de Nicaragua =

Primera División
- Season: 2013–14
- Champions: Apertura: Real Esteli F.C. Clausura: Real Esteli F.C.
- Relegated: Chinandega FC
- Champions League: Real Esteli F.C.
- Matches: 180
- Goals: 520 (2.89 per match)
- Top goalscorer: Apertura: (Spain) Dani Cadena - 11 goals Clausura: (Nicaragua) Xavier Dolmus - 13 goals
- Biggest home win: Apertura: San Marcos 5-0 Real Madriz; Clausura: Walter Ferretti 10-0 Chinandega FC
- Biggest away win: Apertura: Real Madriz 0-4 Diriangén Clausura: Managua 1-5 Juventus
- Highest scoring: Apertura: Chinandega FC 4-5 ART Municipal Jalapa Clausura: Walter Ferretti 10-0 Chinandega FC

The 2013–14 season in Primera División de Nicaragua will be divided into two tournaments (Apertura and Clausura) and will determine the 63rd and 64th champions in the history of the league. It will also provide the sole berth for the 2014–15 CONCACAF Champions League. The Apertura tournament will be played in the second half of 2013, while the Clausura will be played in the first half of 2014.

== General ==
=== Promotion and relegation ===
- At the end of the 2012–13, ART Jalapa, FC San Marcos and Real Madriz were promoted to Primera Division
- At the end of the 2012–13, Xilotepelt were relegated to Segunda Division.

=== Changes in competition formats ===
- The Primera Division was expanded to 10 clubs.

== Team information ==
Last updated: June 28, 2013

=== Personnel and sponsoring (2013 Apertura) ===
Team	Chairman	Head coach	Kitmaker	Shirt sponsor
ART Municipal Jalapa	(Nicaragua) TBD	(Nicaragua) Leónidas Rodríguez	TBD	TBD
Chinandega FC	(Nicaragua) TBA	(Nicaragua) Vidal Alonso	Adidas	None
Diriangén	(Nicaragua) Tulio López	(Argentina) Carlos Alberto de Toro	Joma	Movistar
Juventus	(Nicaragua)	(Nicaragua) Douglas Urbina		Movistar, EZA
Managua F.C.	(Nicaragua) Napoleón Zeledón	(Nicaragua) Emilio Aburto		Managua F.C.
Ocotal	(Nicaragua) Oscar Mendoza	(Nicaragua) Mario Alfaro		
Real Estelí	(Nicaragua) Fidel Moreno	(Nicaragua) Ramón Otoniel Olivas	Galaxia	Movistar, Grupo Bimbo, Yahoo, La Curaçao
Real Madriz	(Nicaragua) TBD	(Nicaragua) Omar Zambrana	TBD	TBD
Walter Ferretti	(Nicaragua) Emilio Rodriguez	(Nicaragua) Florencio Leiva		Policia, Cierro, Banco
FC San Marcos	(Nicaragua) TBD	(Nicaragua) Marcos Bodán		

== Managerial changes ==
=== During the season ===
Team	Outgoing manager	Manner of departure	Date of vacancy	Replaced by	Date of appointment
Chinandega FC	(Nicaragua) Vidal Alonso	Sacked	28 August 2013	(Colombia) Wilson Gil Yuste	28 August 2013
Real Madriz	(Nicaragua) Omar Zambrana	Sacked	30 August 2013	(Nicaragua) Tyron Acevedo (interim)	1 September 2013
Real Madriz	(Nicaragua) Tyron Acevedo	moved to assistant coach	19 September 2013	(El Salvador) Angel Orellana	22 September 2013
Juventus Managua	(Nicaragua) Douglas Urbina	Sacked	October 2013	(Nicaragua) Oscar Blanco (interim)	October 2013

== Apertura ==
The 2013 Apertura was the first tournament of the season. It began in 2013.

=== Regular season ===
The regular season began in August 2012. The top four finishers will move on to the next stage of the competition.

==== Standings ====
Pos	Team	Pld	W	D	L	GF	GA	GD	Pts	Qualification
1	Real Estelí	18	12	4	2	36	12	+24	40	Semi-finals Group
2	Diriangén FC	18	10	4	4	26	17	+9	34	Semi-finals Group
3	Walter Ferretti	18	10	3	5	27	20	+7	33	Semi-finals Group
4	Managua	18	8	7	3	25	14	+11	31	Semi-finals Group
5	Jalapa	18	7	7	4	25	28	−3	28	
6	Ocotal	18	5	9	4	26	21	+5	24	
7	Juventus Managua	18	4	6	8	20	30	−10	18	
8	Chinandega	18	3	4	11	22	36	−14	13	
9	San Marcos	18	3	3	12	25	36	−11	12	
10	Real Madriz	18	3	3	12	17	39	−22	12	

Updated to match(es) played on 27 October 2013. Source: Soccerway
Rules for classification: 1) points; 2) goal difference; 3) number of goals scored.

==== Results ====
Home \ Away	JAL	CHI	DIR	JUV	MAN	OCO	RES	RMD	SMA	WFE
Jalapa		1–0	3–1	1–1	1–1	1–1	0–0	2–1	2–1	0–0
Chinandega	4–5		0–0	2–0	2–1	1–2	0–2	2–2	1–2	1–1
Diriangén FC	2–0	3–1		1–0	0–0	1–1	1–2	1–0	5–3	2–1
Juventus Managua	1–1	3–2	1–1		1–0	0–0	2–2	1–0	2–1	1–4
Managua	2–0	4–0	1–0	1–1		3–3	1–0	1–0	2–1	1–2
Ocotal	3–1	0–0	1–2	4–1	0–0		1–1	4–0	1–0	1–2
Real Estelí	4–0	4–1	3–2	2–1	1–1	3–0		3–0	3–0	3–0
Real Madriz	2–2	3–1	0–4	3–1	0–2	3–2	0–1		1–1	2–3
San Marcos	2–3	1–3	0–2	3–2	1–1	2–2	1–2	5–0		1–3
Walter Ferretti	1–2	2–1	0–1	2–1	1–3	0–0	1–0	3–0	1–0	

Updated to match(es) played on unknown. Source:
Legend: Blue = home team win; Yellow = draw; Red = away team win.

==== Positions by round ====
Team ╲ Round	1	2	3	4	5	6	7	8	9	10	11	12	13	14	15	16	17	18
Real Estelí	3	2	1	1	1	1	1	1	1	1	1	1	1	1	1	1	1	1
Managua	5	3	5	7	7	5	7	5	5	4	3	4	3	2	3	3	4	4
Walter Ferretti	7	5	3	3	2	3	4	3	3	3	2	2	4	4	4	4	3	3
Chinandega	10	10	10	10	10	10	10	10	10	10	10	10	10	10	10	9	8	8
Diriangén FC	1	6	2	2	3	2	2	4	4	5	4	3	2	3	2	2	2	2
Juventus Managua	6	8	7	6	5	7	5	6	6	6	7	7	7	7	7	7	7	7
San Marcos	9	7	8	8	8	8	8	8	8	8	8	8	8	9	9	10	10	9
Ocotal	4	4	6	4	6	6	6	7	7	7	6	6	6	6	6	6	6	6
Real Madriz	8	9	9	9	9	9	9	9	9	9	9	9	9	8	8	8	9	10
Jalapa	2	1	4	5	4	4	3	2	2	2	5	5	5	5	5	5	5	5

Updated to match(es) played on November 2013. Source:

=== Playoffs ===
Semifinals
1	Real Estelí	2	2	4
4	Managua	0	1	1
2	Diriangén	0	1	1
3	Walter Ferretti	1	1	2

Finals
1	Real Estelí	0	1	1
3	Walter Ferretti	0	0	0

==== Semi-finals ====
===== First leg =====
10 November 2013
20:00 (UTC-6)

Walter Ferretti	1–0	Diriangén FC
Pedrinho 19'	Report

Estadio Nacional de Fútbol, Managua
Referee: Julio Arbizo

11 November 2013
20:00 (UTC-6)

Managua F.C.	0–2	Real Estelí
	Report	Rudel Calero 69'; Iuri 79'

Estadio Nacional de Fútbol, Managua
Referee: William Mendoza

===== Second leg =====
17 November 2013
20:00 (UTC-6)

Real Estelí	2–1	Managua F.C.
Manuel Rosas 28'; Rudel Calero 67'	Report	Eric Sierra 20' (pen.)

Estadio Independencia, Estelí
Referee: Noel Vega

Real Estelí won 4–1 on aggregate.

18 November 2013
15:00 (UTC-6)

Diriangén FC	1–1	Walter Ferretti
Lucas Martella 89'	Report	Dany Cadena 86'

Estadio Cacique Diriangen, Diriamba
Referee: William Reyes

Walter Ferretti won 2–1 on aggregate

==== Finals ====
===== First leg =====
23 November 2013
20:00 (UTC-6)

Walter Ferretti	0–0	Real Estelí
	Report

Estadio Nacional de Fútbol, Managua
Referee: Oscar Davila

===== Second leg =====
30 November 2013
20:00 (UTC-6)

Real Estelí	1–0	Walter Ferretti
Franklin López 8'	Report

Estadio Independencia, Estelí
Referee: William Mendoza
- Real Esteli won 1–0 on aggregate score.

Primera Division
2013 Apertura champion

12th title

== Top scorers ==
Rank	Scorer	Club	Goals
1	(Spain) Daniel 'Dani' Cadena	Deportivo Walter Ferretti	11
2	(Nicaragua) Ricardo Vega	Chinandega FC	10
3	(Nicaragua) Rudel Calero	Real Esteli F.C.	9
4	(Nicaragua) Luis Manuel Galeano 'Romario'	ART Jalapa	8
5	(Nicaragua) Raul Leguias	Diriangén FC	8
6	(Nicaragua) Milton Zeledón	ART Jalapa	7
7	(Honduras) Erick Sierra	Managua F.C.	7
8	(Nicaragua) Juan Barrera	Deportivo Walter Ferretti	7
9	(Nicaragua) Emilio Palacios	Diriangén FC	6
10	(Nicaragua) Wilber Sanchez	Real Esteli F.C.	6

Updated to games played on 7 November 2013

== List of foreign players in the league ==
This is a list of foreign players in Apertura 2013. The following players:

1. have played at least one apertura game for the respective club.
2. have not been capped for the Nicaragua national football team on any level, independently from the birthplace

A new rule was introduced this year, that clubs can have upwards of six foreign players in a squad, However some conditions include: The player has to be younger than 30 years old, spent year abroad away from Nicaragua, and clubs can only have five foreign players on the field at one time .

ART Jalapa

- (Honduras) Luis Maradiaga

Chinandega

- (El Salvador) Edwin Samayoa
- (Honduras) Jaime Crisanti
- (Panama) Samuel Kerr
- (Panama) Luis Sinclair
- (Paraguay) Javier Haedo
- (Paraguay) Ramón Ferreira

Diriangén FC

- (Argentina) Diego Brutto
- (Argentina) Rodrigo Lucas Martella
- (Costa Rica) Wendell Porras
- (Costa Rica) Kevin Arrieta
- (Costa Rica) Harold Villalobos

Juventus Managua

- (Honduras) Ronny Colon
- (Honduras) Darwin Guity
- (Honduras) Juan José Tablada
- (Honduras) Jose Armando Cruz
- (Honduras) Abel Dominguez

Managua

- (Colombia) Luis Fernando Gonzales
- (Colombia) Oscar Castillo
- (Colombia) Anderson Palacios
- (Honduras) Erick Sierra

(player released mid season)

Ocotal

- (Honduras) Byron Maradiago
- (Honduras) Marcos Rivera
- (Honduras) Marlon Cruz
- (Honduras) Jonathan Juarez
- (Honduras) José Mejía Benedict
- (Honduras) Jose Luis Fernandez

Real Esteli

- (Honduras) Elmer Mejia
- (Brazil) Alan Kardek
- (Brazil) Leandro Teofilo Santos
- (Brazil) Iuri Oliveira
- (Brazil) Douglas de Souza Ferreira
- (Brazil) Jonathan Joaelton Sampaio

Real Madriz

- (Honduras) Luis Valladarez
- (Honduras) José Luis Palacios
- (Honduras) Edwin Castillo
- (Honduras) Pedro Melendez

San Marcos

- (Argentina) Carlos Javier Martino
- (Panama) Moisés Leguías
- (Mexico) Ramón Pedroza

Walter Ferretti

- (Colombia) Luis Fernando Copete
- (Spain) Dani Cadena
- (Brazil) Pedrinho
- (Brazil) Maycon
- (Honduras) Michell Williams
- (Honduras) Victor Lozano

== Clausura ==
The 2014 Clausura was the first tournament of the season. It began on 4 January 2014. Real Esteli F.C. are the defending champion. The league will consist of 10 teams, each playing a home and away game against the other clubs for a total of 18 games, respectively. The top four teams at the end of the regular season will take part of the playoffs.

== Team information ==
Last updated: December 1, 2013

=== Personnel and sponsoring (2014 Clausura) ===
Team	Chairman	Head coach	Kitmaker	Shirt sponsor
ART Municipal Jalapa	(Nicaragua) Ali Antonio Castellanos	(Nicaragua) Leónidas Rodríguez	TBD	TBD
Chinandega FC	(Nicaragua) TBA	(Colombia) Wilson Gil Yuste	None	None
Diriangén	(Nicaragua) Tulio López	(Brazil) Flavio da Silva	Joma	Movistar
Juventus	(Nicaragua) Ariel Brex	(Nicaragua) Oscar Blanco	None	Movistar, EZA
Managua F.C.	(Nicaragua) Napoleón Zeledón	(Nicaragua) Emilio Aburto		Managua F.C.
Ocotal	(Nicaragua) Oscar Mendoza	(El Salvador) Angel Orellana	None	Alcadia de Ocotal
Real Estelí	(Nicaragua) Helmuth Hurtado	(Nicaragua) Ramón Otoniel Olivas	Galaxia	Movistar, Grupo Bimbo, Yahoo, La Curaçao
Real Madriz	(Nicaragua) TBD	(El Salvador) Juan Ramón Trejo	TBD	TBD
Walter Ferretti	(Nicaragua) Emilio Rodriguez	(Nicaragua) Florencio Leiva		Policia, Cierro, Banco
FC San Marcos	(Nicaragua) TBD	(Nicaragua) Marcos Bodán	None	Transp. Rodriguez

== Managerial changes ==
=== Beginning of the season ===
Team	Outgoing manager	Manner of departure	Date of vacancy	Replaced by	Date of appointment
Diriangén	(Argentina) Carlos de Toro	Resigned	November 2013	(Brazil) Flavio da Silva	TBD
Deportivo Ocotal	(Nicaragua) Mario Alfaro	Resigned	December 2013	(El Salvador) Angel Orellana	December 2013
Real Madriz	(El Salvador) Angel Orellana	Contract expired	November 2013	(El Salvador) Juan Ramon Trejo	TBD

=== During the season ===
Team	Outgoing manager	Manner of departure	Date of vacancy	Replaced by	Date of appointment
Real Madriz	(El Salvador) Juan Ramon Trejo	Resigned	20 February 2014	(Colombia) Luís Eduardo Montaño	TBD
Deportivo Ocotal	(El Salvador) Angel Orellana	Sacked	26 February 2014	(Nicaragua) Randall Moreno	28 February 2014

== Regular season ==
The regular season began in 2014. The top four finishers will move on to the next stage of the competition.

=== Standings ===
Pos	Team	Pld	W	D	L	GF	GA	GD	Pts	Qualification
1	Real Estelí	18	11	6	1	31	9	+22	39	Semi-finals Group
2	Diriangén FC	18	8	9	1	27	15	+12	33	Semi-finals Group
3	Walter Ferretti	18	9	5	4	39	17	+22	32	Semi-finals Group
4	Managua	18	7	6	5	34	25	+9	27	Semi-finals Group
5	Real Madriz	18	8	3	7	28	30	−2	27	
6	Juventus Managua	18	6	7	5	25	21	+4	25	
7	Ocotal	18	4	6	8	20	30	−10	18	
8	San Marcos	18	4	5	9	25	36	−11	17	
9	Jalapa	18	2	6	10	15	33	−18	12	
10	Chinandega	18	1	7	10	19	46	−27	10	

Updated to match(es) played on 16 March 2014. Source: Soccerway
Rules for classification: 1) points; 2) goal difference; 3) number of goals scored.

=== Results ===
Home \ Away	JAL	CHI	DIR	JUV	MAN	OCO	RES	RMD	SMA	WFE
Jalapa		1–0	1–1	2–2	0–0	0–0	1–2	1–2	2–1	1–2
Chinandega	1–0		0–1	2–2	1–4	1–1	2–2	2–3	2–2	0–3
Diriangén FC	3–1	2–2		1–1	0–0	2–2	0–0	2–0	4–1	2–1
Juventus Managua	3–0	2–1	1–2		0–0	1–1	0–2	1–1	1–2	1–1
Managua	2–0	5–2	2–2	1–5		3–1	1–1	4–1	5–2	2–3
Ocotal	1–0	1–1	0–0	0–1	1–2		0–5	1–2	2–0	2–3
Real Estelí	5–2	1–0	2–0	2–0	1–0	2–0		0–0	2–0	1–1
Real Madriz	5–0	1–1	1–2	1–0	4–2	3–4	1–0		1–3	0–2
San Marcos	2–2	6–2	0–3	2–3	1–1	3–1	0–0	0–2		1–4
Walter Ferretti	1–1	10–0	0–0	0–1	1–0	1–2	1–3	5–0	0–0	

Updated to match(es) played on 26 January 2014. Source: Soccerway
Legend: Blue = home team win; Yellow = draw; Red = away team win.

=== Positions by round ===
Team ╲ Round	1	2	3	4	5	6	7	8	9	10	11	12	13	14	15	16	17	18
Real Estelí	2	2	1	3	2	2	2	1	1	1	2	2	3	3	2	1	1	1
Managua	1	1	2	4	4	4	4	2	4	4	4	4	4	4	4	6	4	4
Walter Ferretti	4	4	3	2	1	1	1	3	2	2	1	1	1	1	3	3	3	3
Chinandega	6	6	7	7	5	6	6	7	7	8	8	8	7	9	9	9	10	10
Diriangén FC	5	5	4	1	3	3	3	5	3	5	3	3	2	2	1	2	2	2
Juventus Managua	9	9	6	6	6	5	5	4	5	6	5	5	5	5	6	5	5	6
San Marcos	8	8	8	10	10	10	10	10	9	7	7	7	8	8	8	7	8	8
Ocotal	3	3	5	5	7	7	8	8	8	9	9	9	9	7	7	8	7	7
Real Madriz	10	10	10	9	8	8	7	6	6	5	6	6	6	6	5	4	6	5
Jalapa	7	7	9	8	9	9	9	9	10	10	10	10	10	10	10	10	9	9

=== Playoffs ===
Semifinals
1	Real Estelí	6	4	10
4	Managua	1	1	2
2	Diriangén	1	1	2
3	Walter Ferretti	2	0	2

Finals
1	Real Estelí	2	0	2
3	Diriangén	1	0	1

==== Semi-finals ====
===== First leg =====
29 April 2014

Managua F.C.	1-6	Real Estelí
Medardo Martinez 60'		Mauro Rodríguez 18'; Juan Barrera 19' & 76'; Norfran Lazo 26'; Manuel Rosas 50'; Marcó Martin Cardozo 84'

Estadio Nacional de Fútbol, Managua
Referee: William Mendoza

30 April 2014

Walter Ferretti	2-1	Diriangén FC
Daniel Reyes 2'; Dani Cadena 8'		Jonathan Zapata 36'

Estadio Solidaridad, Somoto
Referee: tbd

===== Second leg =====
3 May 2014
20:00 (UTC-6)

Real Estelí	4-1	Managua F.C.
Manuel Rosas 27' (pen.); Rudel Calero 60'; Juan Barrera 65'; Elmer Mejía 72'	TBD	Manuel Gutierrez 90' (pen.)

Estadio Independencia, Estelí
Referee: TBD

Real Estelí won 10–2 on aggregate.

4 May 2014
15:00 (UTC-6)

Diriangén FC	1-0	Walter Ferretti
José Rodríguez 86'		None

Estadio Cacique Diriangen, Diriamba
Referee: William Reyes

Diriangén FC 2-2 on aggregate won on the away goal rule

==== Finals ====
===== First leg =====
11 May 2014

Diriangén FC	1-2	Real Estelí
José Rodríguez 41'	[]	Samuel Wilson 54' & 88'

Estadio Cacique Diriangen, Diriamba
Referee: William Mendoza Reyes

===== Second leg =====
17 May 2014
8:00pm

Real Estelí	0-0	Diriangén FC
None	[]	None

Estadio Independencia, Estelí
- Real Esteli FC won 2-1 on aggregate score.

Primera Division
2014 Clausura champion

?th title

== Top scorers ==
Rank	Scorer	Club	Goals
1	(Nicaragua) Xavier Dolmus	Deportivo Walter Ferretti	13
2	(Spain) Daniel 'Dani' Cadena	Deportivo Walter Ferretti	11
3	(Colombia) Jose Rodriguez	Diriangén FC	10
4	(Nicaragua) Lesther Jarquín	Juventus Managua	8
5	(Nicaragua) Marcos Méndez	Managua F.C.	7
6	(Nicaragua) Enoc Salgado	Real Madriz	7
7	(Nicaragua) Eulises Ezequiel Pavón	Diriangén FC	7
8	(Nicaragua) Luis Balladares	Real Madriz	7
9	(Nicaragua) Byron Garcia	Managua F.C.	6
10	(Uruguay) Mauro Rodriguez	Real Esteli F.C.	6

Updated to games played on 13 January 2014

== List of foreign players in the league ==
This is a list of foreign players in Clausura 2014. The following players:

1. have played at least one apertura game for the respective club.
2. have not been capped for the Nicaragua national football team on any level, independently from the birthplace

A new rule was introduced this year, that clubs can have upwards of six foreign players in a squad, However some conditions include: The player has to be younger than 30 years old, spent year abroad away from Nicaragua, and clubs can only have five foreign players on the field at one time .

ART Jalapa

- (Honduras) Luis Maradiaga
- (Honduras) Chanel Norales Suazo

Chinandega

- (Honduras) Victor Norales
- (Colombia) Jesus Graizabal
- (Colombia) Pedro de la Rosa
- (Honduras) Juan Acevedo

Diriangén FC

- (Spain) Alex Expósito
- (Colombia) Jose Luis Rodriguez

Juventus Managua

- (Honduras) Israel Lainez
- (Honduras) Juan José Tablada
- (Japan) Kazumichi Ikeda
- (Guatemala) Jonathan Castillo

Managua

- (Colombia) Luis Fernando Gonzales
- (Colombia) Oscar Castillo
- (Honduras) Erick Sierra

(player released mid season)

Ocotal

- (Honduras) Byron Maradiago
- (Honduras) Marcos Rivera
- (Honduras) Jorge Valladares
- (Honduras) Byron Josue Sauceda
- (Honduras) José Francisco Valladares
- (Venezuela) Yitson Lameda

Real Esteli

- (Honduras) Elmer Mejia
- (Spain) Alberto Heredia Ceballos
- (Uruguay) Javier Vitavar
- (Uruguay) Mauro Rodríguez
- (Uruguay) Sebastián Borba
- (Uruguay) Rodrigo Valiente Baraybar

Real Madriz

- (Honduras) Luis Valladarez
- (Colombia) Jose Luis Cassiani
- (Colombia) Alexander Quiñonez
- (Colombia) Ramon Uriarte
- (Colombia) Marlon Barrios

San Marcos

- (Argentina) Allan Marbella Morales
- (Honduras) Keysi Guerreo

Walter Ferretti

- (Brazil) Pedrinho
- (Colombia) Luis Fernando Copete
- (Honduras) Michell Williams
- (Spain) Dani Cadena
- (Sweden) Nicklas Elving
- (Uruguay) Bernardo Laureiro

== Aggregate table ==
Pos	Team	Pld	W	D	L	GF	GA	GD	Pts	Qualification or relegation
1	Real Esteli	36	23	10	3	67	22	+45	79	Qualification for 2014–15 CONCACAF Champions League
2	Diriangén	36	18	13	5	56	32	+24	67	
3	Walter Ferretti	36	20	7	9	69	39	+30	67	
4	Managua F.C.	36	14	13	9	59	42	+17	55	
5	Juventus Managua	36	10	13	13	45	51	−6	43	
6	Ocotal	35	9	14	12	46	51	−5	41	
7	Jalapa	36	9	13	14	40	60	−20	40	
8	Real Madriz	36	11	6	19	44	69	−25	39	Relegation play-off
9	San Marcos	36	7	8	21	51	72	−21	29	Relegation play-off
10	Chinandega (R)	36	4	11	21	42	83	−41	23	Relegation to 2014–15 Segunda División de Fútbol de Nicaragua

Updated to match(es) played on 7 April 2014. Source:
Rules for classification: 1) points; 2) goal difference; 3) number of goals scored.
(R) Relegated
