= 2010–11 Primera División de Nicaragua =

Primera División
- Season: 2010–11
- Champions: Apertura: Walter Ferretti; Clausura: Real Estelí
- Relegated: Xilotepelt & América Managua
- 2011–12 CONCACAF Champions League: Real Estelí
- Goals: 37 goals
- Top goalscorer: Apertura: (Honduras) Herbert Cabrera (15 goals); Clausura: (Honduras) Erick Sierra (10 goals)
- Biggest home win: Ocotal 4–5; Diriangén (March 30, 2011)
- Biggest away win: América Managua 1–5 Diriangén (March 13, 2011)
- Highest scoring: América Managua 7–1; Real Madriz (April 3, 2011)

The 2010–11 season in Primera División de Nicaragua will be divided into two tournaments (Apertura and Clausura) and will determine the 57th and 58th champions in the history of the league. The season will begin on July 25 and end on December 12. It will also provide the sole berth for the 2011–12 CONCACAF Champions League.

== Promotion and relegation ==
Promoted from Segunda División de Fútbol Nicaragua.

- Champions: Managua F.C.
- América Managua (bought the spot of VCP Chinandega).

Relegated to Segunda División de Fútbol Nicaragua.

- Last place: Chinandega FC
- VCP Chinandega (sold their spot to América Managua).

== 2010–11 teams ==
Team	Home city	Stadium	Capacity
Diriangén	Diriamba	Estadio Cacique Diriangén	7,500
Real Estelí	Estelí	Estadio Independencia	4,800
América Managua	Managua	Estadio Olímpico del IND Managua	9,000
Ocotal	Ocotal	Estadio Roy Fernandez	3,000
Walter Ferretti	Managua	Estadio Olímpico del IND Managua	9,000
Xilotepelt	Jinotepe	Estadio Pedro Selva	12,000
Real Madriz	Somoto	Estadio Municipal de Somoto	3,000
Managua F.C.	Managua	Estadio Olímpico del IND Managua	9,000

=== Personnel and sponsoring (2010 Apertura) ===
Team	Chairman	Head coach	Kitmaker	Shirt sponsor
América Managua	(Nicaragua) Eliécer Trillo	(Nicaragua) Martín Mena		
Diriangén	(Nicaragua) Tulio López	(Honduras) Edgard Sosa		Movistar
Managua F.C.	(Nicaragua) Napoleón Zeledón	(Nicaragua) Mario Alfaro		Managua F.C.
Ocotal	(Nicaragua) Oscar Mendoza	(Nicaragua) Vidal Alonso		Marlon Anthony
Real Estelí	(Nicaragua) Fidel Moreno	(Nicaragua) Ramón Otoniel Olivas		Movistar Bimbo yahoo
Real Madriz	(Nicaragua) Adolfo Marenco	(Nicaragua) Sindulio Adolfo Castellanos		Roylan Moylan
Walter Ferretti	(Nicaragua) Carlos Palacios	(Honduras) José Valladares		Movistar Policia
Xilotepelt	(Nicaragua) Wilber López	(Mexico) (Spain) Abel Núñez		U de M

== Managerial changes ==
=== Before the start of the season ===
Team	Outgoing manager	Manner of departure	Date of vacancy	Replaced by	Date of appointment	Position in table
Ocotal	(Nicaragua) Leonidas Rodriguez	Resigned	TBA	(Nicaragua) Eduardo Vidal Alonso	August 13, 2010	7
Managua F.C.	(Argentina) Néstor Holwegger	Resigned	TBA	(Nicaragua) Mario Alfaro	TBA	3

=== During the regular season ===
Team	Outgoing manager	Manner of departure	Date of vacancy	Replaced by	Date of appointment	Position in table
Xilotepelt	(Mexico) Abel Núñez	Sacked	September 1, 2010	(Argentina) Néstor Holwegger	September 1, 2010	TBA
Ocotal	(Nicaragua) Eduardo Vidal Alonso	Resigned	August 28, 2010	(Nicaragua) Randall Moreno	August 28, 2010	TBA
Xilotepelt	(Argentina) Néstor Holwegger	Resigned	October 13, 2010	(Nicaragua) Emilio Palacios	October 13, 2010	TBA
Diriangén	(Honduras) Edgardo Sosa	Sacked	October 13, 2010	(Nicaragua) Rolando Méndez	October 13, 2010	TBA

== Apertura ==
=== Regular season ===
==== Standings ====
Pos	Team	Pld	W	D	L	GF	GA	GD	Pts	Qualification
1	Deportivo Walter Ferretti	14	8	3	3	26	18	+8	27	Qualification for Final round
2	Diriangén F.C.	14	8	2	4	29	17	+12	26	Qualification for Final round
3	Managua F.C.	14	8	2	4	22	15	+7	26	Qualification for Final round
4	Real Madriz	14	6	4	4	16	19	−3	22	Qualification for Final round
5	Real Esteli	14	6	3	5	13	11	+2	21	
6	Xilotepelt	14	3	4	7	17	22	−5	13	
7	Deportivo Ocotal	14	3	4	7	17	23	−6	13	
8	América Managua	14	1	4	9	9	24	−15	7	

=== Finals round ===
==== Semi-finals Group ====
Pos	Team	Pld	W	D	L	GF	GA	GD	Pts	DIR	WFE	MAN	RMD
1	Diriangén	6	5	1	0	9	1	+8	16		1–0	0–0	2–0
2	Walter Ferretti	6	3	1	2	9	3	+6	10	0–1		1–1	4–0
3	Managua	6	2	2	2	7	5	+2	8	1–2	0–1		5–0
4	Real Madriz	6	0	0	6	0	18	−18	0	0–3	0–3	0–1	

Legend: Blue = home team win; Yellow = draw; Red = away team win.
Rules for classification: 1) points; 2) goal difference; 3) number of goals scored.
24 October 2010

Walter Ferreti	1–1	Managua FC
Marlon Mancía 62'		(Brazil) Clayton Da Cunha 42' (pen.)

Estadio Olímpico del IND, Managua, Nicaragua
27 October 2010

Diriangén	2–0	Real Madriz
Remy Vanegas 14'; Darwin Ramírez 30'		None

Estadio Cacique Diriangén, Diriamba, Nicaragua
31 October 2010

Real Madriz	0–3	Walter Ferreti
None		Armando Isamel Reyes 53'; Gonzalo Molina 79'; Ronald Pérez 88'

Estadio Municipal de Somoto, Somoto, Nicaragua
31 October 2010

Managua FC	1–2	Diriangén
(Nicaragua) Edwin Herrera 5'		(Honduras) Herbert Cabrera 53' 75'

Estadio Olímpico del IND, Managua, Nicaragua
7 November 2010

Diriangén	1–0	Walter Ferreti
(Nicaragua) Marcos Méndez 90+3'		None

Estadio Cacique Diriangén, Diriamba, Nicaragua
7 November 2010

Managua FC	5–0	Real Madriz
(Panama) Raúl Leguía 43' 66', (Brazil) Clayton Da Cunha 10', (Nicaragua) Mario Morales 23', (Nicaragua) Norfran Lazo 50'		None

Estadio Olímpico del IND, Managua, Nicaragua
15 November 2010

Real Madriz	0–3	Diriangén
None		Remy Vanegas 47' 67' (Honduras) Herbert Cabrera 85'

Estadio Municipal de Somoto, Somoto, Nicaragua
16 November 2010

Managua FC	0–1	Walter Ferreti
None		Michael Jarquín 75'

Estadio Olímpico del IND, Managua, Nicaragua
22 November 2010

Walter Ferreti	4–0	Real Madriz
(Colombia) José Luis Rodríguez 19' 44', Ismael Reyes 45' (pen.), José Carballo 53'		None

Estadio Olímpico del IND, Managua, Nicaragua
22 November 2010

Diriangén	0–0	Managua FC
None		None

Estadio Cacique Diriangén, Nicaragua
29 November 2010

Real Madriz	0–1	Managua FC
None		Edwin Herrera 90'

Estadio Municipal de Somoto, Somoto, Nicaragua
29 November 2010

Walter Ferreti	0–1	Diriangén
None		Herbert Cabrera 45'

Estadio Olímpico del IND, Managua, Nicaragua

=== Final ===
==== First leg ====
6 December 2010
TBA

Walter Ferretti	1–0	Diriangén
Juan Barrera 77'		None

Olímpico del IND
Managua
Attendance: TBD
Referee: Franklin Jarquín

==== Second leg ====
12 December 2010
TBA

Diriangén	2–1	Walter Ferretti
Marcos Roman 41'; Remi Vanegas 88'		Denis Espinoza 65'

Estadio Cacique Diriangén
Diriamba
Referee: René Guerrero

Primera División de Nicaragua
2010 Apertura champion

4th title

=== Top scorers Apertura ===
Rank	Scorer	Club	Goals
1	(Honduras) Herbert Cabrera	Diriangén	15
2	(Panama) Raúl Leguías	Managua F.C.	9
3	(Nicaragua) Emilio Palacios	Xilotepelt	7
3	(Honduras) Darwin Ramírez	Diriangén	7
3	(Nicaragua) Juan Barrera	Walter Ferretti	7
3	(Argentina) Hugo Silva	América Managua	6
3	(Nicaragua) Ulises Pavón	Diriangén	6
3	(Honduras) Jonathan Juárez	Real Madriz	6

Updated to games played on December 6, 2010.
Post-season goals are included, unlike other topscorers where only regular season goals count.

== Clausura ==
=== Personnel and sponsoring (Clausura 2011) ===
Team	Chairman	Head coach	Kitmaker	Shirt sponsor
América Managua	(Nicaragua)	(Nicaragua) Martin Mena		
Diriangén	(Nicaragua) Danilo Abud	(Nicaragua) Rolando Méndez		Movistar
Managua F.C.	(Nicaragua) Napoleón Zeledón	(Nicaragua) Mario Alfaro		Managua F.C.
Ocotal	(Nicaragua) Oscar Mendoza	(Nicaragua) Omar Zambrana		Marlon Anthony
Real Estelí	(Nicaragua) Fidel Moreno	(Nicaragua) Ramón Otoniel Olivas		Movistar Bimbo yahoo
Real Madriz	(Nicaragua) Adolfo Marenco	(Nicaragua) Sindulio Adolfo Castellanos		Roylan Moylan
Walter Ferretti	(Nicaragua) Carlos Palacios	(Honduras) José Valladares		Movistar Policia
Xilotepelt	(Nicaragua) Wilber López	(Honduras) Miguel Ángel Palacios		U de M, Claro

=== Regular season ===
==== Standings ====
Pos	Team	Pld	W	D	L	GF	GA	GD	Pts	Qualification
1	Real Esteli	14	8	4	2	22	11	+11	28	Qualification for Final round
2	Diriangén F.C.	14	7	3	4	23	16	+7	24	Qualification for Final round
3	Deportivo Walter Ferretti	14	7	1	6	18	14	+4	22	Qualification for Final round
4	Deportivo Ocotal	14	6	3	5	24	26	−2	21	Qualification for Final round
5	América Managua	14	6	2	6	24	20	+4	20	
6	Managua F.C.	14	5	2	7	17	18	−1	17	
7	Xilotepelt	14	3	5	6	18	27	−9	14	
8	Real Madriz	14	1	6	7	11	25	−14	9	

=== Finals round ===
==== Semi-finals Group ====
Pos	Team	Pld	W	D	L	GF	GA	GD	Pts	RES	WFE	DIR	OCO
1	Real Estelí	6	5	0	1	13	2	+11	15		2–0	2–0	5–0
2	Walter Ferretti	6	2	2	2	5	7	−2	8	2–1		3–1	0–0
3	Diriangén	6	1	2	3	4	8	−4	5	0–2	0–0		3–1
4	Ocotal	6	1	2	3	4	9	−5	5	0–1	3–0	0–0	

Legend: Blue = home team win; Yellow = draw; Red = away team win.
Rules for classification: 1) points; 2) goal difference; 3) number of goals scored.
10 April 2011

Diriangén	3–1	Deportivo Ocotal
Germán Umaña 39', David Solórzano 45', Marcos Méndez 69' (og.)		Erick Sierra 26'

Estadio Cacique Diriangén, Diriamba, Nicaragua
10 April 2011

Real Esteli	2–0	Walter Ferretti
José Antonio Flores 37', Rudell Calero 45'		None

Estadio Independencia, Esetli, Nicaragua
13 April 2011

Walter Ferreti	3–1	Diriangén
Medardo Martínez 18', Ronald Pérez 70', Osman Delgado 76'		Herbert Cabrera 16'

Estadio Olimpico IND, Managua, Nicaragua
13 April 2011

Deportivo Ocotal	0–1	Real Esteli
None		Raúl Leguías 60'

Estadio Glorias del Beisbol, , Nicaragua
17 April 2011

Diriangén	0–2	Real Esteli
None		Rudel Calero 28', Franklin López 53'

Estadio Cacique Diriangén, Diriamba, Nicaragua
17 April 2011

Walter Ferreti	0–0	Deportivo Ocotal
None		None

Estadio Olímpico del IND, Managua, Nicaragua
30 April 2011

Real Esteli	2–0	Diriangén
Manuel Rosas 35', Samuel Wilson 85'		None

Estadio Independencia, Esteli, Nicaragua
1 May 2011

Deportivo Ocotal	3–0	Walter Ferreti
Marcos Rivera 75' 89', Ricardo Vega 81'		None

Estadio Glorias del Beisbol, , Nicaragua
4 May 2011

Diriangén	0–0	Walter Ferreti
None		None

Estadio Cacique Diriangén, Diriamba, Nicaragua
4 May 2011

Real Esteli	5–0	Deportivo Ocotal
Félix Rodríguez 13'. Samuel Wilson 35', Eliud Zeledón 37', 55' Wilber Sánchez 77'		None

Estadio Independencia, Esteli, Nicaragua
8 May 2011

Walter Ferreti	2–1	Real Esteli
José Luis Rodríguez 50', Ismael Reyes 79'		Félix Rodríguez 88'

Estadio Olímpico del IND, Managua, Nicaragua
8 May 2011

Deportivo Ocotal	0–0	Diriangén
None		None

Estadio Glorias del Beisbol, , Nicaragua

=== Final ===
==== First leg ====
15 May 2011
3:00 pm

Walter Ferreti	1–0	Real Estelí
Salvador García 51' (og.)		None

Estadio Olímpico del IND
Attendance: TBD
Referee: TBA

==== Second leg ====
21 May 2011
6:00pm

Real Estelí	3–1	Walter Ferreti
Manuel Rosas 10', José Antonio Flores 20', Samuel Wilson 88'		Marlon Mancías 68'

Estadio Independencia
Attendance: TBA
Referee: TBA

Primera División de Nicaragua
2011 Clausura champion

10th title

=== Top goalscorers ===
No.	Player	Team	Goals
1	(Honduras) Erick Sierra	Deportivo Ocotal	10
2	(Nicaragua) Rudel Calero	Real Estelí F.C.	8
3	(Nicaragua) Carlos Alonso	América Managua	7
4	(Honduras) Herbert Cabrera	Diriangén	7
5	(Mexico) Jose Antonio Flores	Real Estelí F.C.	7
6	(Nicaragua) Emilio Palacios	Xilotepelt	6
7	(Argentina) Adrián Morales	América Managua	6
8	(Nicaragua) Ricardo Vega	Deportivo Ocotal	6
9	(Honduras) Jonathan Juarez	Real Madriz	6
10	(Nicaragua) Samuel Wilson	Real Estelí F.C.	6
11	(Nicaragua) Milton Bustos	Xilotepelt	5
12	(Nicaragua) Remy Vanegas	Diriangén	5
13	(Nicaragua) Ronald Perez	Deportivo Walter Ferretti	4
14	(Nicaragua) Nofran Lazo	Managua F.C.	4
15	(Nicaragua) Ronny Colon	América Managua	3
16	(Nicaragua) Carlos Suazo	Xilotepelt	3
17	(Brazil) Clayton Da Cunha	Managua F.C.	3
18	(Nicaragua) German Umana	Diriangén	3
19	(Honduras) Byron Sauceda	América Managua	3
20	(Nicaragua) Elvis Figuero	Managua F.C.	3

== Aggregate table ==
Relegation will be determined by the aggregate table of both Apertura and Clausura tournaments.

Pos	Team	Pld	W	D	L	GF	GA	GD	Pts	Qualification or relegation
1	Diriangén F.C.	28	15	5	8	52	34	+18	50	
2	Real Esteli	28	14	7	7	35	22	+13	49	Qualified to the 2011–12 CONCACAF Champions League Preliminary round
3	Deportivo Walter Ferretti	28	15	4	9	43	32	+11	49	
4	Managua F.C.	28	13	4	11	39	33	+6	43	
5	Deportivo Ocotal	28	9	7	12	41	49	−8	34	
6	Real Madriz	28	7	10	11	27	44	−17	31	
7	América Managua	28	7	6	15	33	44	−11	27	Relegation playoffs
8	Xilotepelt (R)	28	6	9	13	35	49	−14	27	Relegation to Nicaraguan Second Level

(R) Relegated
