= 2011–12 Primera División de Nicaragua =

Primera División
- Season: 2011–12
- Champions: Apertura: Real Estelí; Clausura: Real Estelí
- Relegated: Real Madriz
- Champions League: Real Estelí
- Matches: 4
- Goals: 15 (3.75 per match)
- Top goalscorer: Apertura: (Colombia) Andres Giraldo 12 goals Clausura: (Nicaragua) Rudel Calero and (Nicaragua) Remmy Vanegas 9 goals
- Biggest home win: Apertura: Walter Ferretti 6-1 Chinandega
- Biggest away win: Apertura: Managua 0-3 Chinandega
- Highest scoring: Apertura: Walter Ferretti 6-1 Chinandega

The 2011–12 season in Primera División de Nicaragua will be divided into two tournaments (Apertura and Clausura) and will determine the 59th and 60th champions in the history of the league. It will also provide the sole berth for the 2012–13 CONCACAF Champions League. The Apertura tournament will be played in the second half of 2011, while the Clausura will be played in the first half of 2012.

== Promotion and relegation ==
Promoted from Segunda División de Fútbol Nicaragua.

- Champions: Juventus
- Winner of promotion/relegation playoff: Chinandega FC

Relegated to Segunda División de Fútbol Nicaragua.

- Last place: América Managua (although they didn't finish last they had to replay a game, which the team refused to play and forfeited the match meaning they were relegated).
- Loser of promotion/relegation playoff: Xilotepelt

== Team information ==
Last updated: July 7, 2011

=== Stadia and locations ===
Location of teams in Apertura 2011

Team	Home city	Stadium	Capacity
Chinandega FC	Chinandega	TBA	
Diriangén	Diriamba	Estadio Cacique Diriangén	7,500
Juventus	Managua	Estadio Olímpico del IND Managua	9,000
Managua F.C.	Managua	Estadio Olímpico del IND Managua	9,000
Ocotal	Ocotal	Estadio Roy Fernandez	3,000
Real Estelí	Estelí	Estadio Independencia	4,800
Real Madriz	Somoto	Estadio Municipal de Somoto	3,000
Walter Ferretti	Managua	Estadio Olímpico del IND Managua	9,000

=== Personnel and sponsoring (2011 Apertura) ===
Team	Chairman	Head coach	Kitmaker	Shirt sponsor
Chinandega FC	(Nicaragua) TBA	(Nicaragua) Vidal Alonso		
Diriangén	(Nicaragua) Tulio López	(Costa Rica) Glen Blanco	Joma	Movistar
Juventus	(Nicaragua)	(Nicaragua) Douglas Urbina		
Managua F.C.	(Nicaragua) Napoleón Zeledón	(Nicaragua) Mario Alfaro		Managua F.C.
Ocotal	(Nicaragua) Oscar Mendoza	(Nicaragua) Omar Zambrana		Marlon Anthony
Real Estelí	(Nicaragua) Fidel Moreno	(Nicaragua) Ramón Otoniel Olivas	Galaxia	Movistar, Grupo Bimbo, Yahoo, La Curaçao
Real Madriz	(Nicaragua) Adolfo Marenco	(Nicaragua) Sindulio Adolfo Castellanos		Roylan Moylan
Walter Ferretti	(Nicaragua) Carlos Palacios	(Honduras) José Valladares		Policia, Cierro, Banco

== Managerial changes ==
=== Before the start of the season ===
Team	Outgoing manager	Manner of departure	Date of vacancy	Replaced by	Date of appointment	Position in table
Diriangén	(Nicaragua) Rolando Méndez	sacked	TBA	(Costa Rica) Glen Blanco	August, 2011	3rd
Chinandega FC	(Nicaragua) Reyna Espinoza Morán	replaced moved to assistant manager	TBA	(Nicaragua) Vidal Alonso	August, 2011	promoted

=== During the regular season ===
Team	Outgoing manager	Manner of departure	Date of vacancy	Replaced by	Date of appointment	Position in table
Walter Ferretti	(Honduras) José Valladares	Resigned	August 9, 2011	(Nicaragua) Henry Urbina	TBA	TBA

== Apertura ==
The 2011 Apertura was the first tournament of the season. It began on 6 August 2011.

=== Regular season ===
The regular season began on 6 August 2011. The top four finishers will move on to the next stage of the competition.

==== Standings ====
Pos	Team	Pld	W	D	L	GF	GA	GD	Pts	Qualification
1	Real Esteli	14	10	3	1	21	8	+13	33	Semi-finals Group
2	Managua	14	8	1	5	22	15	+7	25	Semi-finals Group
3	Walter Ferretti	14	7	2	5	28	18	+10	23	Semi-finals Group
4	Chinandega	14	7	2	5	16	15	+1	23	Semi-finals Group
5	Diriangén	14	6	4	4	19	16	+3	22	
6	Juventus Managua	14	3	4	7	22	29	−7	13	
7	Real Madriz	14	3	1	10	20	33	−13	10	
8	Ocotal	14	2	3	9	17	31	−14	9	

Updated to match(es) played on 3 November 2011. Source: Soccerway
Rules for classification: 1) points; 2) goal difference; 3) number of goals scored.

==== Results ====
Home \ Away	CHI	DIR	JUV	MAN	OCO	RES	RMD	WFE
Chinandega		0–2	3–0	1–0	2–1	0–1	1–0	0–0
Diriangén	0–1		3–3	0–3	0–0	0–0	1–3	2–1
Juventus Managua	3–2	1–2		0–1	3–1	1–2	1–2	2–5
Managua	0–3	1–3	0–0		6–0	1–2	3–2	2–1
Ocotal	1–1	0–2	3–3	1–2		1–2	3–2	1–2
Real Esteli	1–0	1–1	2–1	0–1	1–0		3–0	2–1
Real Madriz	0–1	1–2	2–2	3–1	1–4	1–4		2–3
Walter Ferretti	6–1	1–0	1–2	0–1	4–1	0–0	3–2	

Updated to match(es) played on 26 October 2011. Source: Soccerway
Legend: Blue = home team win; Yellow = draw; Red = away team win.

==== Positions by round ====
Team ╲ Round	1	2	3	4	5	6	7	8	9	10	11	12	13	14
Real Esteli	3	2	2	1	3	2	2	1	1	1	1	1	1	1
Managua	8	5	6	8	5	4	4	4	4	4	2	3	2	2
Walter Ferretti	2	1	1	3	2	3	3	3	3	3	4	2	3	3
Chinandega	1	4	5	7	8	8	6	6	6	5	5	5	4	4
Diriangén	4	3	3	2	1	1	1	2	2	2	3	4	5	5
Juventus Managua	5	6	7	4	4	5	5	5	5	6	6	6	6	6
Real Madriz	6	8	8	6	7	7	8	7	8	8	8	8	7	7
Ocotal	7	7	4	5	6	6	7	8	7	7	7	7	8	8

Source: Soccerway

=== Finals round ===
The top two finishers in the Semi-finals Group will move on to the final.

==== Semi-finals Group ====
Pos	Team	Pld	W	D	L	GF	GA	GD	Pts	RES	WFE	MAN	CHI
1	Real Esteli	6	4	1	1	8	3	+5	13		2–1	0–0	3–0
2	Walter Ferretti	6	2	2	2	12	10	+2	8	1–2		1–1	3–2
3	Managua	6	2	2	2	5	7	−2	8	1–0	1–4		1–2
4	Chinandega	6	1	1	4	6	11	−5	4	0–1	2–2	0–1	

Legend: Blue = home team win; Yellow = draw; Red = away team win.
Rules for classification: 1) points; 2) goal difference; 3) number of goals scored.
16 November 2011

Chinandega	2-1	Managua
(Colombia) Andrés Giraldo 29', Adrián Morales 69'		William Mendieta 63'

TBD, TBD
16 November 2011

Real Esteli	2-1	Walter Ferretti
(Mexico) Manuel Rosas 31', Salvador García 46'		Norfran Lazo 65'

TBD, TBD
20 November 2011

Walter Ferretti	1-1	Managua
Darwing Ramírez 12'		Raúl Leguias 55'

Estadio Olímpico del IND, TBD
20 November 2011

Chinandega	0-1	Real Esteli
None		(Honduras) Elmer Mejía 13'

TBD, TBD
23 November 2011

Walter Ferretti	3-2	Chinandega
Axel Villanueva 8', Norfran Lazon 37', Milton Bustos 75'		Eustace Martin 1' (own goal), (Colombia) Andrés Giraldo 90'

TBD, TBD
24 November 2011
8:00pm

Managua	1-0	Real Esteli
(Honduras) Victor Castillo 67'		None

Estadio Olímpico del IND, Managua
27 November 2011

Chinandega	0-1	Managua
None		Raúl Leguías 89'

TBD, TBD
27 November 2011

Walter Ferretti	1-2	Real Esteli
Darwin Ramirez 88'		Samuel Wilson 7', José Montaño 73'

TBD, TBD
1 December 2011

Managua	1-4	Walter Ferretti
Erwin Aguirre 79'		Darwin Ramirez 8', 32', 85', Milton Bustos 76'

TBD, TBD
1 December 2011

Real Esteli	3-0	Chinandega
Wilber Sánchez 8', Feliz Eliud Zeledon 52', Elmer Mejía 52'		None

TBD, TBD
5 December 2011

Chinandega	2-2	Walter Ferretti
(Colombia) Andrés Giraldo 8', Erlin Morán 52'		Kesler Rizo 16', Darwin Ramirez 23'

TBD, TBD
5 December

Real Esteli	0-0	Managua
None		None

TBD, TBD

=== Final ===
==== First leg ====
12 December 2011
8pm

Walter Ferretti	1-1	Real Esteli
Kesler Rizo 70'		Elmer Mejía 3'

Estadio Olímpico del IND (Managua)
Attendance: TBD
Referee: TBA

==== Second leg ====
17 December 2011
TBA

Real Esteli	3-2	Walter Ferretti
Mario García 59' (o.g.), (Honduras) Elmer Mejía 67', (Colombia) Luis González 90+4'		Kesler Rizo 40', (Honduras) Darwin Ramírez 70'

TBD
Referee: TBD

Primera División de Nicaragua
2011 Apertura champion

11th title

== Clausura ==
The 2012 Clausura was the second tournament of the season.

=== Personnel and sponsoring (2011 Apertura) ===
Team	Chairman	Head coach	Kitmaker	Shirt sponsor
Chinandega FC	(Nicaragua) Ortencia Marin	(Nicaragua) Luis Olivares	adidas	
Diriangén	(Nicaragua) Tulio López	(Nicaragua) Martín Mena	Joma	Movistar
Juventus	(Nicaragua)	(Nicaragua) Douglas Urbina		
Managua F.C.	(Nicaragua) Napoleón Zeledón	(Nicaragua) Mario Alfaro	cebjus	Managua F.C.
Ocotal	(Nicaragua) Oscar Mendoza	(Nicaragua) Omar Zambrana	Galaxia	None
Real Estelí	(Nicaragua) Fidel Moreno	(Nicaragua) Ramón Otoniel Olivas	Galaxia	Movistar, Grupo Bimbo, Yahoo, La Curaçao
Real Madriz	(Nicaragua) Adolfo Marenco	(Honduras) Sindulio Adolfo Castellanos		Roylan Moylan
Walter Ferretti	(Nicaragua) Carlos Palacios	(Nicaragua) Henry Urbina		Policia, Cierro, Banco

== Managerial changes ==
=== Before the start of the season ===
Team	Outgoing manager	Manner of departure	Date of vacancy	Replaced by	Date of appointment	Position in table
Chinandega FC	(Nicaragua) Vidal Alonso	sacked	TBA	(Nicaragua) Luis Olivares	January, 2012	4th

=== During the regular season ===
Team	Outgoing manager	Manner of departure	Date of vacancy	Replaced by	Date of appointment	Position in table
Deportivo Ocotal	(Nicaragua) Omar Zambrana	Resigned	11 February 2012	(Panama) Carlos Walcott	12 February 2012	TBA
Managua F.C.	(Nicaragua) Mario Alfaro	Resigned	February 15, 2012	(Nicaragua) Emilio Aburto	TBA	TBA
Diriangen FC	(Nicaragua) Martin Mena	Resigned Personal Issues	February 19, 2012	(El Salvador) Angel Eugenio Orellana	February 20, 2012	3rd
Chinandega FC	(Nicaragua) Luis Olivares	Sacked	February, 2012	(Nicaragua) Reyna Espinizo (Note: She has become the first women to coach a men's first division club)	February, 2012	8th

=== Regular season ===
The top four finishers will move on to the next stage of the competition.

==== Standings ====
Pos	Team	Pld	W	D	L	GF	GA	GD	Pts	Qualification
1	Real Esteli	14	10	2	2	27	8	+19	32	Semi-finals Group
2	Walter Ferretti	14	6	3	5	17	12	+5	21	Semi-finals Group
3	Diriangén	14	5	6	3	15	12	+3	21	Semi-finals Group
4	Managua	14	5	6	3	19	17	+2	21	Semi-finals Group
5	Ocotal	14	6	2	6	22	24	−2	20	
6	Juventus Managua	14	4	3	7	19	22	−3	15	
7	Real Madriz	14	4	3	7	18	23	−5	15	
8	Chinandega	14	1	5	8	11	30	−19	8	

Updated to match(es) played on 6 April 2012. Source:
Rules for classification: 1) points; 2) goal difference; 3) number of goals scored.

==== Results ====
Home \ Away	CHI	DIR	JUV	MAN	OCO	RES	RMD	WFE
Chinandega		0–0	2–4	0–0	2–2	1–2	2–2	0–1
Diriangén	0–0		1–0	2–2	2–0	1–0	3–0	0–0
Juventus Managua	0–1	1–3		2–2	4–1	0–2	2–1	0–2
Managua	4–1	1–1	1–0		0–2	0–1	3–0	0–3
Ocotal	4–0	3–1	3–3	3–1		0–2	1–3	0–1
Real Esteli	3–1	3–0	1–0	1–1	5–1		3–0	1–1
Real Madriz	5–0	0–0	2–3	1–1	0–1	0–2		2–1
Walter Ferretti	3–1	2–1	0–0	1–2	0–1	1–2	1–2	

Updated to match(es) played on 29 January 2012. Source:
Legend: Blue = home team win; Yellow = draw; Red = away team win.

==== Positions by round ====
Team ╲ Round	1	2	3	4	5	6	7	8	9	10	11	12	13	14
Chinandega	7	7	7	8	8	8	8	8	8	8	8	8	8	8
Diriangén	4	2	4	4	5	3	3	3	3	3	3	3	4	3
Juventus Managua	5	8	8	7	4	6	6	7	7	7	7	7	7	6
Managua	2	3	5	5	7	5	5	5	5	6	4	4	3	4
Ocotal	8	6	6	6	6	7	7	6	6	5	5	5	5	5
Real Esteli	1	1	1	1	1	1	1	1	1	1	1	1	1	1
Real Madriz	3	5	3	3	3	4	4	4	4	4	6	6	6	7
Walter Ferretti	6	4	2	2	2	2	2	2	2	2	2	2	2	2

Updated to match(es) played on 6 April 2012. Source:

=== Finals round ===
The top two finishers in the Semi-finals Group will move on to the final.

==== Semi-finals Group ====
Pos	Team	Pld	W	D	L	GF	GA	GD	Pts	RES	DIR	MAN	WFE
1	Real Esteli	6	4	2	0	9	3	+6	14		3–0	1–1	2–1
2	Diriangén	6	4	0	2	12	5	+7	12	0–1		3–0	1–0
3	Managua	6	2	1	3	6	11	−5	7	0–1	0–3		2–1
4	Walter Ferretti	6	0	1	5	6	13	−7	1	1–1	1–4	2–3	

Legend: Blue = home team win; Yellow = draw; Red = away team win.
Rules for classification: 1) points; 2) goal difference; 3) number of goals scored.
14 April 2012
7:00 pm

Real Estelí F.C.	3-0	Diriangén FC
Juan Barrera 20', Rudel Calero 60', Franklin López 89'		None

Estadio Nacional de Managua, Managua
15 April 2012
3:00 pm

Deportivo Walter Ferretti	2-3	Managua F.C.
William Mendieta 45', Armando Reyes 60'		Medardo Martínez 12', Remmy Vanegas 16' and 50'

Estadio Olímpico del IND Managua, Managua
Referee: Oscar Dávila
18 April 2012
3:00pm

Diriangén FC	1-0	Deportivo Walter Ferretti
Erick Téllez 46'		None

Estadio Cacique Diriangén, Diriangén
18 April 2012
3:00pm

Managua F.C.	0-1	Real Estelí F.C.
None		Elmer Mejía 23'

Estadio Nacional de Managua, Managua
22 April 2012
3:00pm

Deportivo Walter Ferretti	1-1	Real Estelí F.C.
Milton Bustos 12'		Samuel Wilson 61'

Estadio Olímpico del IND Managua, Managua
22 April 2012
3:00pm

Diriangén FC	3-0	Managua F.C.
Luis Olivares 6', Eulises Pavón 22', Juan Carlos Narvaez 79'

Estadio Cacique Diriangén, Diriangén
29 April 2012
3:00pm

Diriangén FC	0-1	Real Estelí F.C.
		Elmer Mejia 79'

Estadio Cacique Diriangén, Diriangén
29 April 2012
3:00pm

Managua F.C.	2-1	Deportivo Walter Ferretti
Remmy Vanegas 25', 86'		Milton Bustos 90'

Estadio Nacional de Managua, Managua
2 May 2012
3:00pm

Real Estelí F.C.	1-1	Managua F.C.
Samuel Wilson 78'		Eddy Espino 30'

Estadio Nacional de Managua, Managua
2 May 2012
3:00pm

Deportivo Walter Ferretti	1-4	Diriangén FC
Jessie Lopez 88'		Herberth Cabrera 31' & 42' , David Solorzano 30', Alejandro Tapia 44'

Estadio Olímpico del IND Managua, Managua
6 May 2012
3:00pm

Real Estelí F.C.	2-1	Deportivo Walter Ferretti
Félix Rodríguez 31' & 42'		31'

Estadio Nacional de Managua, Managua
6 May 2012
3:00pm

Managua F.C.	0-3	Diriangén FC
		Herbert Cabrera 60', Luis Peralta 71',Reynaldo Cruz 75'

Estadio Nacional de Managua, Managua

=== Final ===
==== First leg ====
13 May 2012
TBA

Real Estelí F.C.	3-0	Diriangen FC
Marlon Medina 5', Félix Rodríguez 35' 57'		None

TBD
Attendance: TBD
Referee: TBA

==== Second leg ====
15 May 2012
TBA

Diriangen FC	1-3	Real Estelí F.C.
Eulises Pavón 43'		Rudel Calero 7', Samuel Wilson 12' and 53'

TBD
Referee: TBD

Real Esteli won 6-1 on aggregate.

Primera División de Nicaragua
2012 Clausura champion

12th title

== Aggregate table ==
Pos	Team	Pld	W	D	L	GF	GA	GD	Pts	Qualification or relegation
1	Real Esteli	28	20	5	3	48	16	+32	65	Qualification for 2012–13 CONCACAF Champions League Group Stage
2	Managua	28	13	7	8	41	32	+9	46	
3	Walter Ferretti	28	13	5	10	45	30	+15	44	
4	Diriangén	28	11	10	7	34	28	+6	43	
5	Chinandega	28	8	7	13	27	45	−18	31	
6	Ocotal	28	8	5	15	39	55	−16	29	
7	Juventus Managua	28	7	7	14	41	51	−10	28	Relegation playoffs
8	Real Madriz	28	7	4	17	38	56	−18	25	Relegation to Segunda División de Fútbol Nicaragua

Updated to match(es) played on 2 November 2011. Source:
Rules for classification: 1) points; 2) goal difference; 3) number of goals scored.

== List of foreign players in the league ==
This is a list of foreign players in Clausura 2012. The following players:

1. have played at least one apertura game for the respective club.
2. have not been capped for the Nicaragua national football team on any level, independently from the birthplace

A new rule was introduced a few season ago, that clubs can only have four foreign players per club and can only add a new player if a player/s is released.

Chinandega

- (Argentina) Roberto Chanampe
- (Argentina) Jonathan Brigatti
- (Colombia) Christian Rodriguez
- (Honduras) Jaime Crisanto

Diriangén FC

- (Colombia) Johnni Saavedra
- (Colombia) Christian Mena
- (Honduras) Herberth Cabrera
- (Honduras) Victor Castillo

Juventus Managua

- (Honduras) Victor Carrasco
- (Honduras) Jorge Hernandez

Managua

- (Colombia) Andres Giraldo
- (Mexico) Jose Flores
- (Honduras) Christian Batiz
- (Honduras) Juan Tablada

(player released mid season)

Ocotal

- (Honduras) Luis Maradiaga
- (Honduras) Marcos Rivera
- (Honduras) Byron Maradiaga
- (Honduras) Erick Sierra

Real Esteli

- (Honduras) Elmer Mejia
- (Mexico) Manuel Rosas
- (Uruguay) Fernando Alvez
- (Colombia) Luiz Gonzales

Real Madriz

- (Mexico) Ramon Pedrozo
- (Honduras) Victor Norales
- (Honduras) Rony Colon
- (Panama) Julio Pastor Ruiz

Walter Ferretti

- (Honduras) Mario Gracia
- (Colombia) Jose Fernando Parra
- (Colombia) Yaidero Alberio
- (Honduras) Darwig Ramirez
