= 2012–13 Primera División de Nicaragua =

Primera División
- Season: 2012–13
- Champions: Apertura: Real Estelí; Clausura: Real Estelí
- Relegated: Xilotepelt
- Champions League: Real Estelí
- Top goalscorer: Apertura: (Colombia) Andres Giraldo - 11 goals Clausura: TBD - goals
- Biggest home win: Apertura: Diriangén 5 - 1 Chinandega FC; Xilotepelt 5-1 Ocotal; Clausura: Real Estelí 12 - 0 Xilotepelt
- Biggest away win: Clausura: Juventus Managua 0-4 Deportivo Walter Ferretti
- Highest scoring: Clausura: Real Estelí 12 - 0 Xilotepelt

The 2012–13 season in Primera División de Nicaragua was divided into two tournaments (Apertura and Clausura) and determined the 61st and 62nd champions in the history of the league. It also provided the country's sole berth for the 2013–14 CONCACAF Champions League. The Apertura tournament was played in the second half of 2012, while the Clausura was played in the first half of 2013.

== Promotion and relegation ==
Promoted from Segunda División de Fútbol Nicaragua.

- Champions: Xilotepelt

Relegated to Segunda División de Fútbol Nicaragua.

- Last place: Real Madriz.

== Team information ==
Last updated: July 7, 2011

=== Stadia and locations ===
Location of teams in Apertura 2012

Team	Home city	Stadium	Capacity
Chinandega FC	Chinandega	Estadio Efrain Tijerino	8,000
Diriangén	Diriamba	Estadio Cacique Diriangén	7,500
Juventus	Managua	Estadio Olímpico del IND Managua	9,000
Managua F.C.	Managua	Estadio Olímpico del IND Managua	9,000
Ocotal	Ocotal	Estadio Roy Fernandez	3,000
Real Estelí	Estelí	Estadio Independencia	4,800
Walter Ferretti	Managua	Estadio Olímpico del IND Managua	9,000
Xilotepelt	Jinotepe	Estadio Pedro Selva	12,000

=== Personnel and sponsoring (2012 Apertura) ===
Team	Chairman	Head coach	Kitmaker	Shirt sponsor
Chinandega FC	(Nicaragua) TBA	(Nicaragua) Alex Cajina	Adidas	None
Diriangén	(Nicaragua) Tulio López	(Honduras) Francisco Nunez	Joma	Movistar
Juventus	(Nicaragua)	(Nicaragua) Edward Urroz	None	Intracarga, Grao
Managua F.C.	(Nicaragua) Napoleón Zeledón	(Nicaragua) Emilio Aburto		Managua F.C.
Ocotal	(Nicaragua) Oscar Mendoza	(Honduras) Florentino Colindres		Marlon Anthony
Real Estelí	(Nicaragua) Fidel Moreno	(Nicaragua) Ramón Otoniel Olivas	Galaxia	Movistar, Grupo Bimbo, Yahoo, La Curaçao
Walter Ferretti	(Nicaragua) Emilio Rodriguez	(Nicaragua) Henry 'Huesito' Urbina		Policia, Cierro, Banco
Xilotepelt	(Nicaragua) TBD	(Nicaragua) Martin Mena	Gerithen	U de M

== Managerial changes ==
=== Before the start of the season ===
Team	Outgoing manager	Manner of departure	Date of vacancy	Replaced by	Date of appointment
Diriangén	(El Salvador) Angel Orellana	resigned (due to problems with team economics)	June 8, 2012	(Honduras) Francisco Núñez	June 14, 2012
Deportivo Ocotal	(Panama) Carlos Walcott	resigned (personal issues)	9 July 2012	(Honduras) Florentino Colindres	13 July 2012
Xilotepelt	(Nicaragua) Luis "guicho" Díaz	sacked	3 July 2012	(Nicaragua) Martin Mena	4 July 2012

=== During the season ===
Team	Outgoing manager	Manner of departure	Date of vacancy	Replaced by	Date of appointment
Deportivo Ocotal	(Honduras) Florentino Colindres	resigned (poor performance)	30 July 2012	(Honduras) Sindulios Castellano	1 August 2012
Diriangén	(Honduras) Francisco Núñez	resigned (poor performance)	23 September 2012	(Nicaragua) Luis Vega	24 September 2012

== Apertura ==
The 2012 Apertura was the first tournament of the season. It began in August 2012.

=== Regular season ===
The regular season began in August 2012. The top four finishers will move on to the next stage of the competition.

==== Standings ====
Pos	Team	Pld	W	D	L	GF	GA	GD	Pts	Qualification
1	Real Esteli	14	7	5	2	22	12	+10	26	Semi-finals Group
2	Managua	14	6	4	4	16	11	+5	22	Semi-finals Group
3	Walter Ferretti	14	6	2	6	15	11	+4	20	Semi-finals Group
4	Juventus Managua	14	5	5	4	13	14	−1	20	Semi-finals Group
5	Diriangén	14	6	1	7	14	16	−2	19	
6	Ocotal	14	3	7	4	12	16	−4	16	
7	Chinandega	14	4	3	7	16	22	−6	15	
8	Xilotepelt	14	4	3	7	12	18	−6	15	

Updated to match(es) played on September 2012. Source:
Rules for classification: 1) points; 2) goal difference; 3) number of goals scored.

==== Results ====
Home \ Away	CHI	DIR	JUV	MAN	OCO	RES	WFE	XIL
Chinandega		1–0	3–1	1–0	0–0	1–2	2–1	2–2
Diriangén	5–1		2–1	0–0	2–1	0–2	1–0	1–0
Juventus Managua	2–1	0–2		2–2	1–0	0–0	0–1	0–0
Managua	2–1	2–0	1–2		0–1	0–2	2–1	3–0
Ocotal	0–0	1–0	1–1	0–0		0–0	1–1	3–0
Real Esteli	4–2	2–0	1–2	1–1	2–2		1–1	2–0
Walter Ferretti	1–0	3–0	0–1	0–1	3–0	2–1		1–0
Xilotepelt	1–0	2–1	0–0	0–2	5–1	1–2	1–0	

Updated to match(es) played on September 2012. Source: Soccerway
Legend: Blue = home team win; Yellow = draw; Red = away team win.

==== Positions by round ====
Team ╲ Round	1	2	3	4	5	6	7	8	9	10	11	12	13	14
Real Esteli	2	2	6	4	4	5	3	1	2	2	2	2	1	1
Managua	6	3	3	3	3	2	2	3	1	1	1	1	2	2
Walter Ferretti	1	1	1	1	2	1	1	2	5	4	5	4	5	3
Chinandega	7	6	5	5	6	7	6	7	8	8	6	7	6	7
Diriangén	4	5	4	6	5	4	5	5	4	5	3	5	3	5
Juventus Managua	3	4	2	2	1	3	4	4	3	3	4	3	4	4
Xilotepelt	5	8	8	8	8	8	8	6	7	6	7	6	7	8
Ocotal	8	7	7	7	7	6	7	8	6	7	8	8	8	6

=== Finals round ===
The top two finishers in the Semi-finals Group will move on to the final.

==== Semi-finals Group ====
Pos	Team	Pld	W	D	L	GF	GA	GD	Pts	RES	WFE	MAN	JUV
1	Real Esteli	6	3	3	0	10	5	+5	12		1–1	2–1	1–1
2	Walter Ferretti	6	2	3	1	5	5	0	9	0–2		1–0	1–0
3	Managua	6	2	2	2	6	6	0	8	1–1	0–0		2–1
4	Juventus Managua	6	0	2	4	6	11	−5	2	1–3	2–2	1–2	

Legend: Blue = home team win; Yellow = draw; Red = away team win.
Rules for classification: 1) points; 2) goal difference; 3) number of goals scored.
20 October 2012

Managua	2 – 1	Juventus Managua
Erick Sierra 18', Herbert Cabrera 72'		Cantillo 63'

Estadio Nacional UNAN, Managua
Referee: Oscar Davila
21 October 2012

Real Esteli	1 – 1	Walter Ferretti
Samuel Wilson 25'		Ismael Reyes 50'

Estadio Independencia, Esteli
Referee: Rene Guerrero
28 October 2012

Walter Ferretti	1 – 0	Managua
Darwing Ramírez 18'

Estadio Nacional UNAN, Managua
Referee: William Reyes
29 October 2012

Juventus Managua	1 – 3	Real Esteli
Victor Carrasco 73'		Manuel Rosas 57', Rudel Calero 62', Jefry Araica 88'

Estadio Nacional UNAN, Managua
10 November 2012

Walter Ferretti	1 – 0	Juventus Managua
Juan Rosales 76'

Estadio Nacional UNAN, Managua
Referee: William Reyes
11 November 2012

Managua	1 – 1	Real Esteli
Medardo Martinez 20'		Samuel Wilson 32'

Estadio Nacional UNAN, Managua
17 November 2012

Juventus Managua	1 – 2	Managua
63'		Erick Sierra 18', Remy Vanegas 72'

Estadio Nacional UNAN, Managua
10 November 2012

Walter Ferretti	0 – 2	Real Esteli
Samuel Wilson 25', Wilber Sanchez 50'

Estadio Nacional UNAN, Managua
24 November 2012

Managua	0 – 0	Walter Ferretti

Estadio Nacional UNAN, Managua
Referee: William Reyes
24 November 2012

Real Esteli	1 – 1	Juventus Managua
Rudel Calero 76'		Carlos Membreño 80'

Estadio Independencia, Esteli
2 December 2012

Juventus Managua	2 – 2	Walter Ferretti
Ronny Colon 35', Henry Garcia 73'		Juan Rosales 78', Ricardo Vegas 54'

Estadio Nacional UNAN, Managua
2 December 2012

Real Esteli	2 – 1	Managua
Elmer Mejia 28', Manuel Rosas 32'		Erick Sierra 12'

Estadio Independencia, Esteli
Referee: William Reyes

=== Final ===
==== First leg ====
9 December 2012

Walter Ferretti	0 – 0	Real Esteli

Estadio Olímpico del IND (Managua)

==== Second leg ====
16 December 2011

Real Esteli	4 – 0	Walter Ferretti
Rudel Calero 35' & 60'; Manuel Rosas 77' & 80'		None

Estadio Independencia

Primera División de Nicaragua
2012 Apertura champion

13th title

== Top scorers ==
Rank	Scorer	Club	Goals
1	(Colombia) Andres Giraldo	Chinandega FC	11
2	(Nicaragua) Rudel Calero	Real Esteli F.C.	9
3	(Honduras) Herberth Cabrera	Managua F.C.	7
4	(Nicaragua) Samuel Wilson	Real Esteli F.C.	7
5	(Nicaragua) Eulises Pavon	Diriangén FC	6
6	(Honduras) Elmer Mejia	Real Esteli F.C.	6
7	(Nicaragua) Ricardo Vega	Deportivo Walter Ferretti	5
8	(Honduras) Ronny Colon	Juventus Managua	5

Updated to games played on 14 September 2012.
Post-season goals are not included, only regular season goals.

== List of foreign players in the league ==
This is a list of foreign players in Apertura 2012. The following players:

1. have played at least one apertura game for the respective club.
2. have not been capped for the Nicaragua national football team on any level, independently from the birthplace

A new rule was introduced this year, that clubs can have upwards of five foreign players in a squad, However some conditions include: The player has to be younger than 30 years old, spent year abroad away from Nicaragua, and clubs can only have four foreign players on the field at one time .

Chinandega

- (Colombia) Andres Giraldo
- (Colombia) Gustavo Reyes
- (Colombia) Juan Davis Restrepo
- (Honduras) Víctor Norales
- (Colombia) Cristian Rodríguez

Diriangén FC

- (Colombia) Johnni Saavedra
- (Colombia) Christian Mena
- (Honduras) Wilson Flores
- (Honduras) Gerson Martínez

Juventus Managua

- (Honduras) Victor Carrasco
- (Honduras) Jorge Hernandez
- (Colombia) Daniel Henao
- (Honduras) Ronny Colon

Managua

- (Mexico) Jose Flores
- (Honduras) Christian Batiz
- (Colombia) Luis Fernando González
- (Colombia) Fernando Copete
- (Honduras) Herberth Cabrera

(player released mid season)

Ocotal

- (Honduras) Luis Maradiaga
- (Honduras) Marcos Rivera
- (Honduras) Byron Maradiaga
- (Honduras) Cesar Salandia

Real Esteli

- (Honduras) Elmer Mejia
- (Mexico) Manuel Rosas
- (Uruguay) Fernando Alvez
- (Colombia) Ronald Quintero
- (Uruguay) Gabriel Mirazo Villar

Xilotepelt

- (Colombia) Oscar Castillo
- (Panama) Mandell Scott
- (Panama) George Tinglin
- (Panama) Álvaro Salazar

Walter Ferretti

- (Honduras) Mario Gracia
- (Brazil) David da Silva
- (Honduras) Darwig Ramirez
- (Honduras) Darwin Guity
- (Honduras) Víctor Lozano

== Clausura ==
The 2013 Clausura was the second tournament of the season.

=== Personnel and sponsoring (2013 Clausura) ===
Team	Chairman	Head coach	Kitmaker	Shirt sponsor
Chinandega FC	(Nicaragua) TBA	(Nicaragua) Alex Cajina	Adidas	
Diriangén	(Nicaragua) Tulio López	(Argentina) Carlos Alberto de Toro	Joma	Movistar
Juventus	(Nicaragua) Edward Urroz	(Nicaragua) Douglas Urbina	None	UNEM
Managua F.C.	(Nicaragua) Napoleón Zeledón	(Nicaragua) Emilio Aburto		Managua F.C.
Ocotal	(Nicaragua) Oscar Mendoza	(Honduras) Sindulio Castellano	Tecnitasa	Alcadia de Ocotal
Real Estelí	(Nicaragua) Fidel Moreno	(Nicaragua) Ramón Otoniel Olivas	Galaxia	Movistar, Grupo Bimbo, Yahoo, La Curaçao
Walter Ferretti	(Nicaragua) Emilio Rodriguez	(Nicaragua) Henry 'Huesito' Urbina	Dejudo	Claro, Albanisa, Flor de Cana, Ramos, Mediotipca
Xilotepelt	(Nicaragua) TBD	(El Salvador) Angel Orellana	TBD	TBD

== Managerial changes ==
=== Before the start of the season ===
Team	Outgoing manager	Manner of departure	Date of vacancy	Replaced by	Date of appointment
Diriangén	(Nicaragua) Luis Vega	Sacked	October 2012	(Argentina) Carlos Alberto de Toro	November 2012
Xilotepelt	(Nicaragua) Martin Mena	Sacked	December 2012	(El Salvador) Angel Orellana	January 2013

=== During the season ===
Team	Outgoing manager	Manner of departure	Date of vacancy	Replaced by	Date of appointment
Deportivo Ocotal	(Honduras) Sindulios Castellano	resigned (poor performance)	Feb 2013	(Nicaragua) Mario Alfaro	March 2013
Xilotepelt	(El Salvador) Angel Orellana	resigned (Personal Reasons)	Feb 2013	(Nicaragua) TBD	March 2013
Deportivo Walter Ferretti	(Nicaragua) Henry 'Huesito' Urbina	resigned (Personal Reasons)	March 2013	(Nicaragua) Luis 'Gaucho' Diaz	March 2013

== Clausura ==
The 2013 Clausura was the first tournament of the season. It began in August 2012.

=== Regular season ===
The regular season began on 2013. The top four finishers will move on to the next stage of the competition.

==== Standings ====
Pos	Team	Pld	W	D	L	GF	GA	GD	Pts	Qualification
1	Diriangén	14	9	4	1	25	10	+15	31	Semi-finals Group
2	Real Esteli	14	8	4	2	33	5	+28	28	Semi-finals Group
3	Walter Ferretti	14	6	4	4	22	13	+9	22	Semi-finals Group
4	Managua	14	5	4	5	18	16	+2	19	Semi-finals Group
5	Ocotal	14	5	4	5	19	21	−2	19	
6	Juventus Managua	14	4	2	8	19	27	−8	14	
7	Chinandega	14	2	4	8	13	30	−17	10	
8	Xilotepelt	14	1	5	8	14	41	−27	8	

Updated to match(es) played on 2013. Source:
Rules for classification: 1) points; 2) goal difference; 3) number of goals scored.

==== Results ====
Home \ Away	CHI	DIR	JUV	MAN	OCO	RES	WFE	XIL
Chinandega		2–4	3–1	1–3	1–1	1–1	0–1	3–3
Diriangén	3–0		2–0	1–1	2–2	1–0	3–2	4–1
Juventus Managua	0–1	0–2		1–0	2–3	1–1	0–4	6–1
Managua	6–1	0–0	1–1		2–0	0–1	2–1	1–2
Ocotal	2–0	0–2	1–2	3–0		0–1	3–2	3–1
Real Esteli	5–0	2–0	2–0	0–1	5–0		1–1	12–0
Walter Ferretti	0–0	0–1	3–0	4–1	0–0	0–0		2–1
Xilotepelt	0–0	0–0	3–5	0–0	1–1	0–2	1–2	

Updated to match(es) played on 29 April 2013. Source:
Legend: Blue = home team win; Yellow = draw; Red = away team win.

==== Positions by round ====
Team ╲ Round	1	2	3	4	5	6	7	8	9	10	11	12	13	14
Real Esteli	1	1	1	1	2	2	1	1	1	1	1	1	1	2
Managua	4	4	4	4	3	3	3	3	4	4	4	5	5	4
Walter Ferretti	5	3	3	3	4	4	4	4	3	3	3	3	3	3
Chinandega	8	8	8	5	5	5	7	7	8	8	7	7	7	7
Diriangén	2	2	2	2	1	1	2	2	2	2	2	2	2	1
Juventus Managua	3	7	7	7	6	6	5	5	5	6	6	6	6	6
Xilotepelt	7	6	6	8	8	7	8	8	7	7	8	8	8	8
Ocotal	6	5	5	6	7	8	6	6	6	5	5	4	4	5

Updated to match(es) played on April 29, 2013. Source:

=== Finals round ===
The top two finishers in the Semi-finals Group will move on to the final.

==== Semi-finals Group ====
Pos	Team	Pld	W	D	L	GF	GA	GD	Pts	WFE	RES	MAN	DIR
1	Walter Ferretti	6	4	2	0	12	4	+8	14		1–1	2–1	2–0
2	Real Esteli	6	3	2	1	8	4	+4	11	1–1		1–0	1–0
3	Managua	6	2	0	4	5	12	−7	6	0–4	0–3		3–2
4	Diriangén	6	1	0	5	5	10	−5	3	1–2	2–1	0–1	

Legend: Blue = home team win; Yellow = draw; Red = away team win.
Rules for classification: 1) points; 2) goal difference; 3) number of goals scored.
4 May 2013
8pm

Real Esteli	1-0	Managua
Felix Rodriguez 83'	[]	None

Estadio Independencia, Esteli
Referee: Oscar Davilla
5 May 2013
3pm

Diriangén FC	1-2	Walter Ferretti
Lucas Martella 83'	[]	Maycon Santana 52', Mitchell Williams 60'

Estadio Cacique
8 May 2013
3pm

Managua	3-2	Diriangén FC
Darwin Salinas 83'; 83', Remmy Vanegas 83'	[]	David Solórzano 83'; Jorge Portocarrero 83'

Estadio Nacional UNAN, Managua
8 May 2012
6pm

Walter Ferretti	1-1	Real Esteli
Milton Bustos 83'	[]	Salvador García 83'

Estadio Nacional UNAN, Managua
11 May 2013
6pm

Walter Ferretti	2-1	Managua
Pedrinho 83', Víctor Lozano 83'	[]	Erick Sierra 83'

Estadio Nacional UNAN, Managua
12 May 2013
3pm

Real Esteli	1-0	Diriangén FC
Rudel Calero 83'	[]

Estadio Cacique
18 May 2013
3pm

Managua	0-3	Real Esteli
	[]	Rudel Calero 1' and 19', Norfran Lazo 85'

Estadio Nacional UNAN, Managua
Referee: Oscar Davila
18 May 2013
6pm

Walter Ferretti	2-0	Diriangén FC
Ricardo Vega 4', Osman Delgado 20'	[]

Estadio Nacional UNAN, Managua
Referee: William Mendoza
22 May 2013
3pm

Real Esteli	1-1	Walter Ferretti
Norfrraan Lazo	[]	Ricardo Vega

Estadio Independencia, Esteli
22 May 2013
3pm

Diriangén FC	0-1	Managua
	[]	Bryan Garcia

Estadio Cacique
25 May 2013
8pm

Diriangén FC	2-1	Real Esteli
Diego Diaz	[]	Elmer Mejía, Quintero own goal

Estadio Cacique, Cacique
25 May 2013
8pm

Managua	0-4	Walter Ferretti
	[]	Juan Rosales(2), Enrique González, Axel Villanueva

Estadio Nacional UNAN, Managua

=== Final ===
==== First leg ====
1 June 2013

Real Esteli	3-0	Walter Ferretti
Félix Rodríguez 25', Wilber Sánchez 63', Elmer Mejía 91'		None

Estadio Independencia

==== Second leg ====
8 June 2013

Real Esteli	3-0	Walter Ferretti
Wilber Sánchez 5'	Awarded	None

Estadio Olímpico del IND (Managua)
- The game was called after sixty six minutes of play after Walter Ferretti fan base caused to much disruption to the games with rioting, flares and objects being thrown on the pitch, Real Esetli won the series 6-0 on aggregate.

Primera División de Nicaragua
2013 Clausura champion

14th title

== List of foreign players in the league ==
This is a list of foreign players in Apertura 2012. The following players:

1. have played at least one apertura game for the respective club.
2. have not been capped for the Nicaragua national football team on any level, independently from the birthplace

A new rule was introduced this year, that clubs can have upwards of five foreign players in a squad, However some conditions include: The player has to be younger than 30 years old, spent year abroad away from Nicaragua, and clubs can only have four foreign players on the field at one time .

Chinandega

- (Colombia) Andres Giraldo
- (Colombia) Gustavo Reyes
- (Colombia) Juan Davis Restrepo
- (Honduras) Víctor Norales
- (Colombia) Cristian Rodríguez

Diriangén FC

- (Colombia) Johnni Saavedra
- (Colombia) Christian Mena
- (Honduras) Wilson Flores
- (Honduras) Gerson Martínez
- (Argentina) Lucas Martella
- (Costa Rica) Luis Rodriguez

Juventus Managua

- (Honduras) Victor Carrasco
- (Honduras) Jorge Hernandez
- (Colombia) Daniel Henao
- (Honduras) Ronny Colon

Managua

- (Mexico) Jose Flores
- (Honduras) Christian Batiz
- (Colombia) Luis Fernando González
- (Colombia) Fernando Copete
- (Honduras) Herberth Cabrera

(player released mid season)

Ocotal

- (Honduras) Juan José Tablada
- (Honduras) Marcos Rivera
- (Honduras) José Javier Mejía
- (Honduras) Cesar Salandia
- (Honduras) Jonathan Juárez

Real Esteli

- (Honduras) Elmer Mejia
- (Brazil) Assad Esteves
- (Uruguay) Paulo Ortiz
- (Colombia) Ronald Quintero
- (Uruguay) Gabriel Mirazo Villar

Xilotepelt

- (Colombia) Oscar Palomino Castillo
- (Mexico) Jaime Romo
- (Panama) George Tinglin
- (Costa Rica) Gilberth Sequeira

Walter Ferretti

- (Brazil) Pedro Augusto Pedrinho
- (Brazil) Mayco Santana
- (Honduras) Darwig Ramirez
- (Honduras) Mitchel Williams
- (Honduras) Víctor Lozano

== Aggregate table ==
Pos	Team	Pld	W	D	L	GF	GA	GD	Pts	Qualification
1	Real Esteli	28	15	9	4	55	17	+38	54	Qualification for 2013–14 CONCACAF Champions League
2	Diriangén	28	15	5	8	39	26	+13	50	
3	Walter Ferretti	28	12	6	10	37	24	+13	42	
4	Managua	28	11	8	9	34	27	+7	41	
5	Ocotal	28	8	11	9	31	37	−6	35	
6	Juventus Managua	28	9	7	12	32	41	−9	34	
7	Chinandega	28	6	7	15	29	52	−23	25	
8	Xilotepelt	28	5	8	15	26	59	−33	23	Relegation playoffs

Updated to match(es) played on September 2012. Source:
Rules for classification: 1) points; 2) goal difference; 3) number of goals scored.
