= Rudel Calero =

Nicaraguan footballer (born 1982)

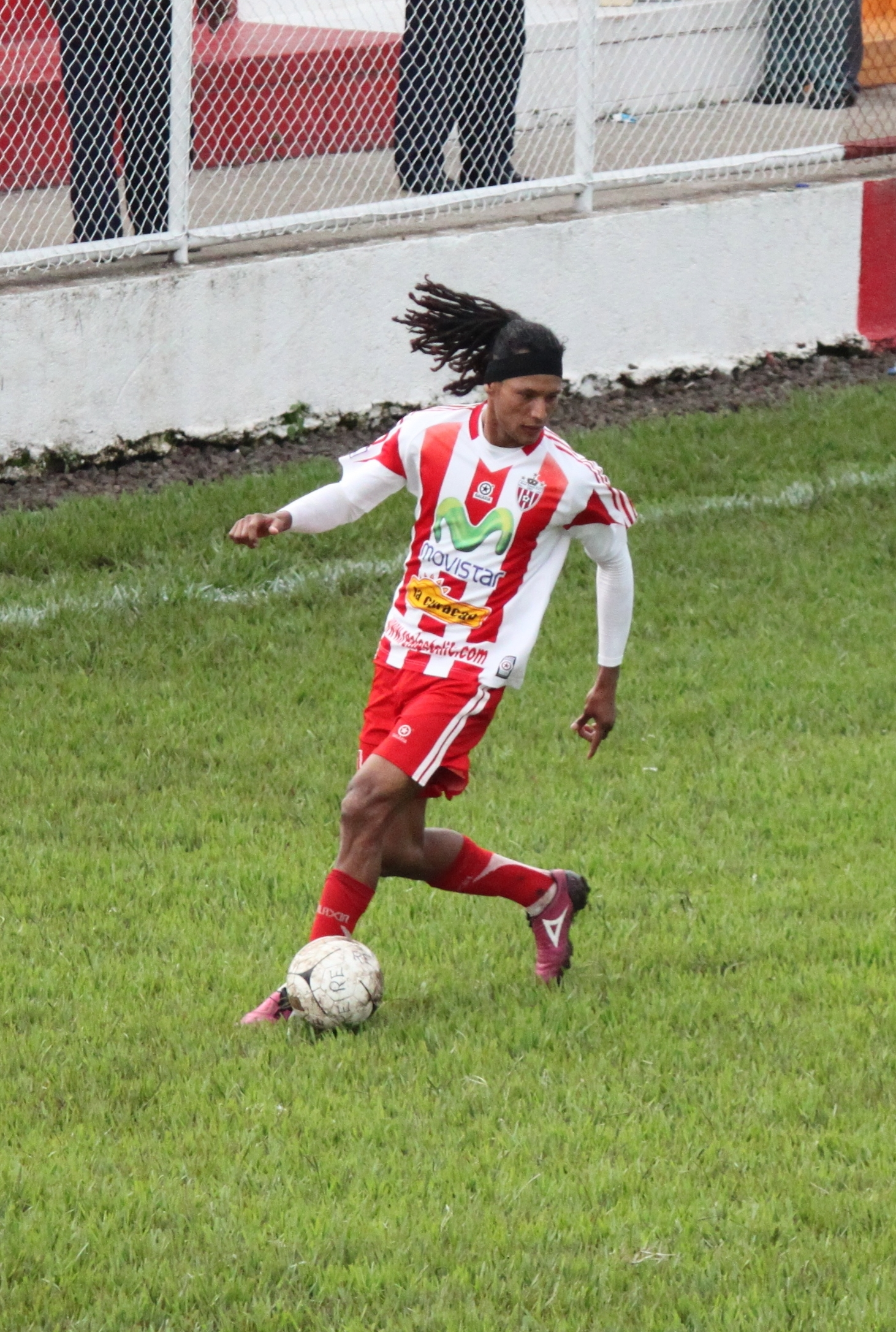

Personal information
- Full name: Rudel Alessandro Calero Nicaragua
- Date of birth: December 20, 1982 (age 43)
- Place of birth: Bluefields, Nicaragua
- Position: Striker

Team information
- Current team: Real Estelí
- Number: 8

Senior career*
Years	Team	Apps	(Gls)
2000–2009	Bluefields		
2002–2004	América		
2004–2008	Real Estelí		(78)
2009–2010	Bluefields		(1)
2010-2016	Real Estelí		(66)
2016-2017	Boer F.C.		

International career^{‡}
2001–2011	Nicaragua	26	(4)
- * Club domestic league appearances and goals ‡ National team caps and goals as of December 2016

Rudel Alessandro Calero Nicaragua (born December 20, 1982) is a Nicaraguan footballer who currently plays for Real Estelí and the Nicaragua national football team.

== Club career ==
Born in Bluefields, he made his debut for Deportivo Bluefields and played for América before enjoying a lengthy spell with Nicaraguan giants Real Estelí. He was Estelí's top goalscorer in the 2005 Clausura and Apertura with 11 and 16 goals respectively but after scoring only 7 in the 2007 Apertura he was relegated to the bench only for Bluefield to try to lure him back to the club.

=== Controversy ===
In September 2010, Calero was charged with assault of a young man, the son of a prominent Nicaraguan businessman. Calero claimed the boy swore at him. He already faced prosecution for damage to property, after damaging a vehicle. The ill-disciplined Calero was again arrested in July 2012 after assaulting a citizen and allegedly threatening him with death.

== International career ==
Calero made his debut for Nicaragua in an April 2001 friendly match against Belize and has, as of December 2013, earned a total of 26 caps, scoring 4 goals. He has represented his country in 2 FIFA World Cup qualification matches and played at the 2001, 2003, 2005 and 2011 UNCAF Nations Cups as well as at the 2009 CONCACAF Gold Cup.

His final international was a January 2011 Copa Centroamericana match against Guatemala.

=== International goals ===
Scores and results list Honduras' goal tally first.

N.	Date	Venue	Opponent	Score	Result	Competition
1.	26 April 2001	MCC Grounds, Belize City, Belize	Belize		1–2	Friendly match
2.	29 February 2004	Estadio Independencia, Estelí, Nicaragua	Haiti	1–1	1–1	Friendly match
3.	30 April 2004	Estadio Cacique Diriangén, Diriamba, Nicaragua	Bermuda	1–0	2–0	Friendly match
4.	13 June 2004	Estadio Cacique Diriangén, Diriamba, Nicaragua	Saint Vincent and the Grenadines	2–2	2–2	2006 FIFA World Cup qualification
