= Managua FC =

Association football club in Nicaragua

Managua F.C.
- Full name: Managua Fútbol Club
- Nicknames: La Maquinaria Azul (The Blue Machinery); Los Leones Azules (The Blue Lions); El Orgullo de la Capital (The Pride of the Capital)
- Founded: 2006; 20 years ago
- Ground: Estadio Miguel Chocorrón Buitrago
- Capacity: 9,000
- Chairman: Denis Salinas
- Manager: Flavio da Silva
- League: Liga Primera
- 2024–25: TBD
| Home colours | Away colours |

Managua Fútbol Club is a professional football club based in Managua, Nicaragua which currently plays in the Nicaraguan Premier Division.

== History ==
The team was promoted to the Primera División for the first time in their history in 2009–10 after beating Deportivo América in a two-legged Segunda División championship final.

They made an immediate impact on the top flight, qualifying for the semi-finals in their first season (Apertura 2010). Since then, they have been a regular playoff participant and even reached the finals of the 2017 Apertura, losing on away goals to Walter Ferretti.

In 2018, the club had its most successful period in its history under the guidance of Nicaraguan Emilio Aburto. The club were able to win their first championship (the Apertura 2018) in club history. Managua won 1–0 over two legged series against powerful club Real Esteli F.C.; Lucas dos Santos was the lone goal-scorer for Managua and he was the league-leading goalscorer that season.

== Achievements ==
- Primera División de Nicaragua and predecessors
  - Champions (2) : 2018 Apertura, Clausura 2025
  - Runners-up (4): Apertura 2017, Apertura 2019, Clausura 2020, Clausura 2021
- Segunda División de Nicaragua and predecessors
  - Champions (1): 2009–10
- Copa de Nicaragua:
  - Champions (1): 2019

== First Division record (2010–present) ==
Apertura 2010 – present

| Season | Position | GP | W | D | L | GF | GA | PTS | Play-offs | Pl. | W | D | L | GS | GA | PTS |
|---|---|---|---|---|---|---|---|---|---|---|---|---|---|---|---|---|
| 2010 Apertura | 3rd | 14 | 8 | 2 | 4 | 22 | 15 | 26 | Semi-finals | 6 | 2 | 2 | 2 | 5 | 3 | 8 |
| 2011 Clausura | 6th | 14 | 5 | 2 | 7 | 17 | 18 | 17 | Did not qualify | | | | | | | |
| 2011 Apertura | 2nd | 14 | 8 | 1 | 5 | 22 | 15 | 25 | Semi-finals | 6 | 2 | 2 | 2 | 5 | 7 | 8 |
| 2012 Clausura | 4th | 14 | 5 | 6 | 3 | 19 | 17 | 21 | Semi-finals | 6 | 2 | 1 | 3 | 6 | 11 | 7 |
| 2012 Apertura | 2nd | 14 | 6 | 4 | 4 | 16 | 11 | 22 | Semi-finals | 6 | 2 | 2 | 2 | 6 | 6 | 8 |
| 2013 Clausura | 4th | 14 | 5 | 4 | 5 | 18 | 16 | 19 | Semi-finals | 6 | 2 | 0 | 4 | 5 | 12 | 6 |
| 2013 Apertura | 4th | 18 | 8 | 7 | 3 | 25 | 14 | 31 | Semi-finals | 2 | 0 | 0 | 2 | 1 | 4 | 0 |
| 2014 Clausura | 4th | 18 | 7 | 6 | 5 | 34 | 25 | 27 | Semi-finals | 2 | 0 | 0 | 2 | 2 | 10 | 0 |
| 2014 Apertura | 5th | 18 | 7 | 5 | 6 | 24 | 17 | 26 | Did not qualify | | | | | | | |

== Current squad ==
As of May, 2026 Note: Flags indicate national team as defined under FIFA eligibility rules; some limited exceptions apply. Players may hold more than one non-FIFA nationality.

| No. | Pos. | Nation | Player |
|---|---|---|---|
| 1 | GK | NCA | Alyer Lopez |
| 2 | DF | NCA | Ramon Estrada |
| 3 | DF | ARG | Matías Steib |
| 4 | DF | COL | Darwin Carrero |
| 5 | MF | NCA | Josué Calderón |
| 7 | MF | NCA | Kevin Serapio |
| 8 | MF | ARG | Cristian Ramírez |
| 9 | FW | CUB | Maikel Reyes |
| 10 | FW | NCA | Jose Martinez |
| 11 | FW | ARG | Nazareno Gómez |
| 12 | DF | NCA | Allan Caballero |
| 14 | DF | NCA | Steven Cáceres |

| No. | Pos. | Nation | Player |
|---|---|---|---|
| 15 | DF | NCA | Cristhian Herrera |
| 16 | MF | NCA | Jeremy Cuarezma |
| 17 | FW | NCA | Abner Acuña |
| 18 | MF | NCA | Ethan Lopez |
| 23 | GK | CRC | Daniel Villegas |
| 29 | MF | NCA | Jhonrry Córdoba |
| 30 | FW | CUB | Daniel Díaz |
| 32 | MF | NCA | Edwin Zepeda |
| 33 | FW | NCA | Deyvis Ramos |
| 36 | FW | NCA | Anthony Calderón |
| 48 | MF | NCA | Leslie Mejía |

=== Players with dual citizenship ===
- (Nicaragua) (Costa Rica) Daniel Villegas

=== In ===
Note: Flags indicate national team as defined under FIFA eligibility rules; some limited exceptions apply. Players may hold more than one non-FIFA nationality.

| No. | Pos. | Nation | Player |
|---|---|---|---|
| — | | ARG | Nazareno Gómez (Loaned From Matagalpa) |
| — | GK | NCA | Daniel Villegas (from Municipal Liberia) |
| — | | CUB | Daniel Diaz (from TBD) |
| — | | NCA | Josué Calderón (from UNAM Managua) |
| — | | ARG | Matias Steib (loaned from Alianza) |

| No. | Pos. | Nation | Player |
|---|---|---|---|
| — | | NCA | TBD (from TBD) |
| — | | NCA | TBD (from TBD) |
| — | | NCA | TBD (from TBD) |

=== Out ===
Note: Flags indicate national team as defined under FIFA eligibility rules; some limited exceptions apply. Players may hold more than one non-FIFA nationality.

| No. | Pos. | Nation | Player |
|---|---|---|---|
| — | FW | PAN | Carlos Small (to TBD) |
| — | | NCA | Jefferson Bonilla (to TBD) |
| — | | ARG | Mauro Verón (to TBD) |
| — | | NCA | William Palacios (end of loan) |

| No. | Pos. | Nation | Player |
|---|---|---|---|
| — | | COL | Carlos Hernández (to TBD) |
| — | GK | NCA | Erling Mendez |
| — | | NCA | TBD |

== Notable players ==
=== Notable players ===
- (Brazil) Lucas dos Santos (100 goals)
- (Brazil) Christian Fernandez
- (Brazil) Clayton José da Cunha (2010–11)
- (Venezuela) Edward Murillo
- (Honduras) Mario García
- (Honduras) Víctor Norales (2010–11)
- (Nicaragua) Gerardo Arce
- (Nicaragua) Ewing Herrera
- (Nicaragua) Marvin Joseph
- (Nicaragua) Brandon Joseph Ramírez (2010–2011)
- (Nicaragua) Justo Lorente (2018–2019)
- (Nicaragua) Norfran Lazo (2011–2012)
- (Nicaragua) Raúl Leguías (2009–2010)
- (Nicaragua) Erling Mendez (2006-2026)
- (Nicaragua) Ivan Méndez
- (Nicaragua) William Mendieta
- (Nicaragua) Mario Morales
- (Nicaragua) Luis Olivares

=== One-club men ===
| Name | Nationality | Position | Managua Debut | Managua Last Match |
|---|---|---|---|---|
| Jairo Gutiérrez | (Nicaragua) | Defender | 2006 | 2018 |

== Coaching staff ==
As of July, 2025

| Position | Staff |
|---|---|
| Manager | (Argentina) Daniel Corti |
| Assistant Manager | (Uruguay) Cristian Olivera |
| Assistant Manager | (El Salvador) José Alonso |
| Physical coach | (Argentina) Alejandro Blasco |
| Goalkeeper Coach | (Nicaragua) TBD |
| Physiotherapist | (Nicaragua) TBD |
| Team Doctor | (Nicaragua) TBD |
| Under 20 coach | (Nicaragua) Emilio Aburto |

== List of coaches ==
Managua has had permanent managers since it first appointed TBD as coach in 2007. The longest-serving manager was Emilio Aburto, who managed Managua for three years from Feb 2012 to Jan 2015. Argentinian Nestor Holweger was the first foreign coach in the club and helped the club win its first title, winning the second division in 2009. Emilio Aburto is the most successful manager as he led the club to two Primera division title in 2018 and in 2025 and first Copa de Nicaragua in 2019.

- (Argentina) Nestor Holweger (August 2009 – August 2010)
- (Nicaragua) Mario Alfaro (August 2010 – February 2012)
- (Nicaragua) Emilio Aburto (February 2012 – January 2015)
- (Nicaragua) Carlos Zambrana (January 2015 – December 2015)
- (Brazil) Flavio Da Silva (December 2015 – June 2016)
- (Venezuela) Amleto Bonaccorso (June 2016 – August 2016)
- (Venezuela) Jack Galindo (August 2016 – September 2016)
- (Costa Rica) Luis Fernando Fallas (September 2016 – November 2016)
- (Venezuela) Jack Galindo (November 2016 – February 2017)
- (Nicaragua) Emilio Aburto (Feb 2017 – May 2017)
- (Nicaragua) Tyron Acevedo (May 2017 – Sept 2017)
- (Nicaragua) Emilio Aburto (September 2017 – August 2021)
- (Spain) Juan Cortes (September 2021 - August 2022)
- (Nicaragua) Emilio Aburto (August 2022 - December 2022)
- (Brazil) Flavio Da Silva (December 2022 – October 2024)
- (Nicaragua) Emilio Aburto (October 2024 – May 2026)
- (Argentina) Daniel Corti (May 2026 – Present)

=== Notable managers ===
The following managers have won at least one trophy while in charge at Managua FC:

| Name | Nationality | From | To | Honours |
|---|---|---|---|---|
| Emilio Aburto | Nicaragua | 1 February 2012; 1 February 2017; 1 September 2017; 1 December 2022 | 28 January 2015; 28 May 2017; 28 December 2022; 28 December 2025 | 2 Liga Primera de Nicaragua (2018 Apertura, Clausura 2025) 1 Copa de Nicaragua (2019) |

== Records ==
=== Record versus other Clubs ===
As of 2025-03-12

The Concacaf opponents below = Official tournament results: (Plus a sampling of other results)

| Opponent | Last Meeting | G | W | D | L | F | A | PTS | +/- |
|---|---|---|---|---|---|---|---|---|---|
| (Guatemala) Antigua GFC | 2025 Central American Cup | 1 | 0 | 0 | 1 | 1 | 4 | 0 | -3 |
| (Costa Rica) LD Alajuelense | 2025 Central American Cup | 1 | 0 | 0 | 1 | 1 | 2 | 0 | -1 |
| (El Salvador) Alianza | 2025 Central American Cup | 1 | 0 | 0 | 1 | 0 | 1 | 0 | -1 |
| (Costa Rica) Guanacasteca | 2024 Central American Cup | 1 | 0 | 1 | 0 | 1 | 1 | 1 | 0 |
| (El Salvador) FAS | 2020 CONCACAF League | 1 | 0 | 1 | 0 | 1 | 1 | 1 | 1 |
| (Honduras) Olimpia | 2020 CONCACAF League | 1 | 0 | 0 | 1 | 6 | 0 | 0 | 0 |
| (Honduras) Motagua | 2019 CONCACAF League | 2 | 0 | 1 | 1 | 2 | 3 | 1 | -4 |
| (Guatemala) Municipal | 2024 Central American Cup | 1 | 1 | 0 | 0 | 1 | 0 | 3 | 1 |
| (Nicaragua) Real Esteli | 2024 Central American Cup | 1 | 0 | 0 | 1 | 0 | 3 | 0 | -3 |
| (Costa Rica) Saprissa | 2024 Central American Cup | 1 | 0 | 0 | 1 | 2 | 3 | 0 | -1 |
| (Panama) Plaza Amador | 2025 Central American Cup | 0 | 0 | 0 | 0 | 0 | 0 | 0 | 0 |
| Totals | | | | | | | | | |
