= Otoniel =

Otoniel is a given name. Notable people with this name include:

- Dario Antonio Úsuga, Colombian drug trafficker (nicknamed 'Otoniel')
- Otoniel Olivas (born 1968), Nicaraguan footballer
- Otoniel Quintana (1946–2018), Colombian footballer, mostly played for Millonarios
- Otoniel Gonzaga (tenor singer) (1942–2018), Filipino singer
- Otoniel Gonzaga (sport shooter) (1913–?), Filipino sports shooter
- Otoniel Carranza (born 1983), Salvadorean footballer
