= Otoniel Gonzaga =

Otoniel Gonzaga may refer to:

- Otoniel Gonzaga (sport shooter)
- Otoniel Gonzaga (tenor singer)
