= Estadio Pedro Selva =

Baseball stadium in Nicaragua

Coordinates: 11°50′58″N 86°12′18″W

- Interactive map of Estadio Pedro Selva
- Full name: Estadio Pedro Selva
- Location: Jinotepe, Nicaragua
- Capacity: 12,000

Tenant
- Xilotepelt

Estadio Pedro Selva is a professional baseball stadium, home of the Cafeteros de Carazo, which represents the city of Jinotepe and also the Carazo department in the German Pomares baseball league, and Professional Baseball League of Nicaragua. The stadium has also been used for soccer and was the home of the track and field teams "Xilotepel" and "Carazo".

Its name is a tribute to Carazo native Pedro Selva. "El Bambino", who won four triple crowns in his career (1971, 1972, 1973, and 1975).
