= Holver Flores =

Nicaraguan football manager (born 1997)

Personal information
- Full name: Holver Flores Ruiz
- Date of birth: 3 February 1997 (age 29)
- Place of birth: Nicaragua

Youth career
- Years: Team
- Real Estelí

Managerial career
- 2019: Real Estelí (assistant)
- 2019–2021: Real Estelí
- 2021–: Nicaragua U20

Holver Flores Ruiz (born 3 February 1997) is a Nicaraguan football manager who manages Nicaragua U20.

== Life and career ==
Flores was born on 3 February 1997 in Nicaragua. He grew up in Estelí, Nicaragua. As a youth player, he joined the youth academy of Real Estelí. He stopped playing football to focus on football management as a teenager. He studied international relations. He has worked as a football commentator. He has also worked as a journalist.

Flores studied football management in Spain. He obtained the UEFA A License. He has been regarded to prefer the 4-3-3 formation. In 2019, he was appointed as an assistant manager of Real Estelí. Previously, he worked as a youth manager for them. He helped the under-17 team win the league. After that, he was appointed manager of the club. He became the youngest manager to manage in the Nicaraguan top flight. He helped them win the league. He managed them in the CONCACAF League. In 2021, he was appointed manager of the Nicaragua national under-20 football team.
