= Raúl Leguías =

Panamanian-Nicaraguan footballer (born 1981)

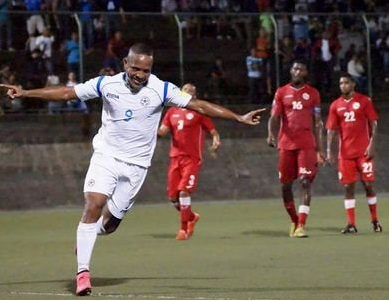

Personal information
- Full name: Raúl Moisés Leguías Ávila
- Date of birth: 9 October 1981 (age 45)
- Place of birth: Colón, Panama
- Height: 1.79 m (5 ft 10 in)
- Position: Forward

Team information
- Current team: AD Santa Rosa

Senior career*
Years	Team	Apps	(Gls)
1998	Municipal de Colón		
1999	Sporting 89		
2000	Plaza Amador		
2000	Colón River Plate		
2001	Tauro		
2002	Árabe Unido		
2003	Real Estelí		(1)
2003	CEFAR		
2003	Deportivo Colonia		
2004–2005	América		(3)
2006	Platense		
2006–2007	Masatepe		(19)
2007–2009	Diriangén		(16)
2009	San Pedro		
2009–2010	Managua		(9)
2010–2011	Real Estelí		(3)
2011–2012	Managua		(10)
2012–2013	Onze Bravos	2	(1)
2013	Diriangén	21	(9)
2014	Cerro Largo		
2014	Walter Ferretti	22	(7)
2015	AS Puma	12	(2)
2015–2016	Walter Ferretti	39	(20)
2016–2017	UNAN Managua	38	(6)
2018–2019	Chinandega	18	(4)
2019–2020	AD Santa Rosa		(5)

International career
2011–2016	Nicaragua	23	(8)
- * Club domestic league appearances and goals as of 5 May 2018

Raúl Moisés Leguías Ávila (born 9 October 1981) is a football forward who plays for AD Santa Rosa.

== Club career ==
A much-travelled striker or attacking midfielder, Leguías has spent most of his playing career in Panama and Nicaragua but he has also played club football in Guatemala, El Salvador, Angola and Uruguay.

He made his debut with Guatemalan second division side San Pedro in February 2009 only to return to Nicaragua to play for Managua and Real Estelí. In summer 2012 he joined Angolan outfit Onze Bravos, where he scored on his debut and signed for Diriangén a year later. In January 2014 he arrived in Uruguay to play for Cerro Largo.

Leguías and compatriot Luis Fernando Copete joined Costa Rican side AS Puma for the 2015 Verano season.

Leguias with 107 Goals Scored in 14 Seasons with 8 different teams occupies the 8th position among the top scorers in the history of the Short Tournaments (as of the 2003–04 season) in the Liga Primera de Nicaragua.

== International career ==
Panama-born (and therefore nicknamed Pananica) Leguías changed citizenship made his debut for Nicaragua in a January 2011 Copa Centroamericana match against Panama and has, as of December 2013, earned a total of 13 caps, scoring 3 goals. He has represented his country in 4 FIFA World Cup qualification matches and played at the 2011 and 2013 Copa Centroamericanas.

=== International goals ===
Scores and results list Nicaraguas' goal tally first.

N.	Date	Venue	Opponent	Score	Result	Competition
1.	26 May 2011	Estadio Pedro Marrero, Havana, Cuba	Cuba	1–0	1–1	Friendly
2.	2 September 2011	Windsor Park, Roseau, Dominica	Dominica	1–0	2–0	2014 WCQ
3.	11 November 2011	Nicaragua National Football Stadium, Managua, Nicaragua	Dominica	1–0	1–0	2014 WCQ
4.	29 March 2015	Ronald Webster Park, The Valley, Anguilla	Anguilla	1–0	3–0	2018 WCQ
5.	29 March 2015	Ronald Webster Park, The Valley, Anguilla	Anguilla	3–0	3–0	2018 WCQ
6.	16 June 2015	André Kamperveen Stadion, Paramaribo, Suriname	Suriname	1–1	3–1	2018 WCQ
7.	8 December 2015	Nicaragua National Football Stadium, Managua, Nicaragua	Cuba	3–0	5–0	Friendly
8.	27 January 2016	Dennis Martínez National Stadium, Managua, Nicaragua	Honduras	1–0	1–3	Friendly

== Personal life ==
Leguías is married and has two daughters who reside in Dolores, Carazo Department.
