= Otoniel Gonzaga (tenor singer) =

Filipino tenor singer (1942–2018)

- Born: 31 July 1942; Iloilo, Philippines
- Died: 13 January 2018 (aged 75); Vienna, Austria
- Education: Central Philippine University; Ottawa University (Ottawa, Kansas); Curtis Institute of Music (Philadelphia, Pennsylvania)
- Occupation: Operatic tenor

Otoniel Gonzaga (July 31, 1942 – January 13, 2018) was an internationally renowned Filipino tenor singer. He was involved in concerts in collaboration with Filipino singers and musical artists. He also worked with prominent conductors such as Pablo Casals, Herbert von Karajan, Giuseppe Patane, Eugene Ormandy, Max Rudolf, Alberto Erede, Sir John Pritchard and Michael Gielen.

== Death ==
Gonzaga died on January 13, 2018, aged 75, in Vienna.
