= Real Estelí FC =

Association football club in Nicaragua

Real Estelí
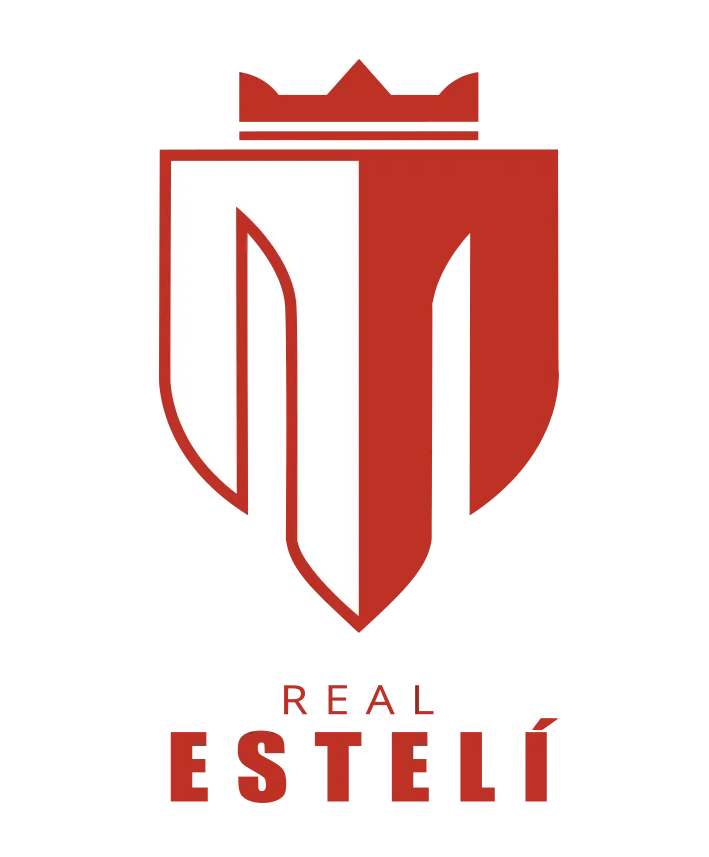
- Full name: Real Esteli Football Club
- Nicknames: El Tren del Norte (The Train of the North); Los Kamikaze (The Kamikaze)
- Founded: 1961; 65 years ago (as Estelí FC)
- Ground: Estadio Independencia
- Capacity: 11,000
- Chairman: (Nicaragua) Fidel Moreno
- Manager: (Nicaragua) Ramón Otoniel Olivas
- League: Liga Primera
- Apertura 2023: Regular season: 1st Playoffs: Runners-up
- Website: www.realestelifc.com
Home colours	Away colours	Third colours

Real Esteli Fútbol Club is a Nicaraguan professional football club playing in the top flight of Nicaragua's league system, the Campeonato Nacional de Fútbol de Primera División. The club play out of their home stadium, Estadio Independencia, in the northern city of Estelí.

Real Estelí has the second-most national championships in Nicaragua, only trailing Diriangén. They won a CONCACAF-record eight consecutive championships from 2006 to 2014.

== History ==
The club was founded in 1960 as Estelí FC, adding Real to its name in 1961. Estelí FC plays at the Estadio Independencia, one of the biggest stadiums in Nicaragua, with a capacity of 4,800 and higher, due to renovations made.

The club is known by the nickname, El Tren del Norte (Train of the North), coming as it does, from the northern region of Las Segovias.

Real Estelí has finished in the top five of Nicaragua's top flight every year since 1986. In that time, they have also achieved traditionally high attendance numbers. However, it took time for the club's growing popularity to translate into championships.

The club under Leonidas "Cascarilla" Rodriguez and Honduran Roy Posas were able to win the club first silverware, winning both the League and cup double. Players that contributed with players such as Otoniel Olivas, Salvadoran Julio "El Cura" Barahona, Honduran Samuel Nunez, and Ramon "ElChino" Mejia then added another in 1999. Nonetheless, their fierce rivals Diriangén FC remained the dominant power in Nicaraguan football.

This began to change in 2002–2003. The two clubs met for a two-legged tie to determine the year's champion. Diriangén won the first leg 1–0, but Real Estelí answered by winning the return match 3–0, claiming the title 3–1 on aggregate. That was the last year Nicaragua determined their championship with a "long season"; for 2003–2004, the league adopted an Apertura/Clausura format. Real Estelí won both tournaments, and each time they defeated Diriangén in the finals.

The following September, Real Estelí made history in Nicaraguan football by eliminating favorites Real España in the First Round of the Copa Interclubes UNCAF. They thus became the first Nicaraguan football team in history to advance to the second round of the tournament.

Back home, Diriangén won the next two championships, but quickly gave way to Real Estelí, who embarked on their dominant run of eight championships in a row from 2006 to 2014. Then, after a brief interruption by Walter Ferretti, Estelí won two more.

Real Estelí FC has finished in the top five of Nicaragua's top division every year since 1986 and has achieved some of the highest attendances in the league during this period.

In 2023 CONCACAF Central American Cup, Making their first appearance in the modified Tournament, Real Esteli finished second in group, where they defeated highly rated opponents FAS, Xelaju and Olimpia, The club only loss was against Independiente who topped the group. In the Quarter Final, Real Estelí Made history by winning their two legs series against Concacaf heavyweight Saprissa 3-2. Not only becoming the first Nicaraguan club to defeat Saprissa but also the first Nicaraguan to qualify to the semi final of an international tournament. In the semi-finals against Independiente they defeated the Panamanian side 3-2 in two legs to advance to the first international final in the club's history. However, in the final played over two legs, Costa Rican Giants Alajuelense would beat Real Esteli 4–1.

Real Esteli entered the 2024 CONCACAF Champions Cup in the first-round and faced off against seven-time champions Club America. Esteli won the home leg 2–1, which marked the club's first win in the competition in 31 matches.

=== Crest ===
The club crest consists of a crown, representing 'Real' (meaning 'Royal'). Similar crowns can be seen on the crests of many other clubs with the prefix 'Real', such as Spanish clubs Real Betis, Real Zaragoza and Real Madrid

The two gold stars of the crest mark the first two national championships won by the club (in 1991 and 1999), while the red and white striped shield represents the club colours as used on team shirts. The logo was redesigned and digitalised in 2000 by Nakor'd J. García and Michael D. Raney (current President/CEO of the World Football Organization), based on the original design by Arnulfo Rivera Zeledón and Johnny Herrera Vallejos.

=== 'El Clásico' rivalry ===
There is often a fierce rivalry between the two strongest teams in the national league, where the game between Real Estelí and Diriangén has become known as El Clásico (The Classic).

== Honours ==
Real Esteli is historically the second most successful team in Nicaragua football, as they have won the second most Primera División de Nicaragua with nineteen. They are also Nicaragua's most successful team in international competitions, having finished runner up in CONCACAF Tournament.

=== Domestic honours ===
==== League ====
- Primera División de Nicaragua and predecessors
  - Champions (22): 1991, 1998−99, 2002−03, 2003 Apertura, 2004 Clausura, 2006−07, 2007−08, 2008−09, 2009−10, 2010−11, 2011−12, 2012−13, 2013−14, 2015−16, 2016−17, 2019 Clausura, 2019 Apertura, 2020 Clausura, 2020 Apertura, 2022 Apertura, 2023 Clausura, 2026 Clausura

==== Domestic Cups ====
- Copa de Nicaragua
  - Champions (2): 1991, 2023

=== International honours ===
==== CONCACAF ====
- CONCACAF Central American Cup
  - Runners up (1): 2023, 2024

== Players ==
=== Current squad ===
As of 25 September 2026

Note: Flags indicate national team as defined under FIFA eligibility rules; some limited exceptions apply. Players may hold more than one non-FIFA nationality.

No.	Pos.	Nation	Player
1	GK	URU	John Faust
2	DF	ARG	Ignacio Artola
3	DF	NCA	Henry Niño
4	DF	NCA	Marvin Fletes
6	MF	URU	Adrián Colombino
7	FW	NCA	Byron Bonilla
8	MF	HON	Hector Aranda
9	FW	NCA	Edgar Castillo
10	MF	NCA	Harold Medina
11	MF	NCA	Juan Barrera
12	MF	NCA	Widman Talavera
13	MF	NCA	Agenor Baez
15	MF	NCA	Javier Toledo
16	MF	NCA	Marlon López

No.	Pos.	Nation	Player
17	MF	NCA	Kreyton Downs
18	FW	NCA	Nextaly Rodríguez
19	DF	NCA	Evert Martinez
20	MF	NCA	Leyner Moses
21	FW	ARG	Emanuel Casado
22	GK	NCA	Erick Cerda
23	DF	NCA	Óscar Acevedo
24	MF	NCA	Albert Calero
25	GK	NCA	César Salandía
27	DF	NCA	Josué Quijano
28	MF	ARG	Ricardo Darío Blanco
29	DF	NCA	Joab Gutiérrez
30	MF	NCA	Osmin Salinas

=== Players with dual citizenship ===
- (Nicaragua) (Costa Rica) Juan Carlos Amador
- (Nicaragua) (Costa Rica) Junior Delgado
- (Nicaragua) (Norway) Matías Moldskred Belli

=== Out on loan ===
Note: Flags indicate national team as defined under FIFA eligibility rules; some limited exceptions apply. Players may hold more than one non-FIFA nationality.

No.	Pos.	Nation	Player
—		NCA	Erick Cerda (at Club Sport Sebaco for the 2025-26 Seasons)
—		NCA	Roger Gomez (at UNAN Managua for the 2025-26 Seasons)
—		NCA	Keylon Batiz (at Club Sport Sebaco for the 2025-26 Seasons)

=== In ===
Note: Flags indicate national team as defined under FIFA eligibility rules; some limited exceptions apply. Players may hold more than one non-FIFA nationality.

No.	Pos.	Nation	Player
—	GK	URU	John Faust (from Mictlán)
—		NCA	Roger Gómez (Return from loan UNAM Managua)
—	FW	NCA	Bryan Ordóñez (Return from loan Juventus Managua)
—		NCA	Kreyton Downs (from Juventus Managua)
—		URU	Adrián Colombino (from TBD)
—		ARG	Ricardo Darío Blanco (from TBD)

No.	Pos.	Nation	Player
—	GK	NCA	Erick Cerda (Return from loan Sebaco)
—	GK	NCA	Denvorn Fox (=Return from loan Sebaco)
—	FW	NCA	Keylon Batiz (Return from loan Sebaco)
—		NCA	TBD (from TBD)

=== Out ===
Note: Flags indicate national team as defined under FIFA eligibility rules; some limited exceptions apply. Players may hold more than one non-FIFA nationality.

No.	Pos.	Nation	Player
—		PAR	Nicolás Morínigo (to TBD)
—		URU	Joaquín Vergés (to TBD)
—		CRC	Darryl Parker (to TBD)
—		NCA	Jason Vega (to TBD)

No.	Pos.	Nation	Player
—		NCA	Nextaly Rodríguez (to TBD)
—		CRC	Juan Carlos Amador (to Rancho Santana FC)
—		NCA	TBD (to TBD)
—		NCA	TBD (to TBD)

== Notable players ==
Players with senior international caps:

- Dshon Forbes (capped for Nicaragua)
- (Honduras) (Nicaragua) Elmer Mejía
- (Nicaragua) (Mexico) Manuel Rosas
- (Nicaragua) (Panama) Raúl Leguías

== Records and statistics ==
Real Esteli's biggest league victory was 13–2 against Chinandega in the 2001 season.

== Personnel ==
=== Management ===
As of January 2026

Position	Name
Manager	(Argentina) Diego Vásquez
Assistant Manager	(Honduras) Fernando Banegas
Goalkeeping Coach	(Colombia) Carlos Arias
Fitness Coach	(Honduras) Jair Aguilar
Fitness coach	(Nicaragua) Carlos Rivera

=== List of coaches ===
Real Esteli has had various coaches since its formation in 1961. Ramón Otoniel Olivas and Honduran Roy Posas has served two terms as head coach. Ramón Otoniel Olivas was the club's most successful coach, having won Primera División titles and finished as runner up in 2023 Central American Cup, following closely is Roy Posas, Sergio Rodriguez and Holver Flores & Leonidas Rodriguez won one Primera titles.

Name	Nat	From	To	Notes
Rigoberto Núñez	(Costa Rica)	1961	1965	First coach and foreign coach
Santiago Berrini	(Argentina)	1965	1965	TBD
Manuel Catarro Cuadra	(Nicaragua)	TBD	TBD	TBD
Nestor Matamala † (1940-2023)	(Chile)	1975	1976	TBD
Jose Burboa	(Nicaragua)	TBD	TBD	TBD
Marcos A. Gamboa	(Nicaragua)	TBD	TBD	TBD
Leonidas Rodríguez	(Nicaragua)	1990	1991	First Primera division Title (1991)
Roy Posas † (-2021)	(Honduras)	1991	1992	TBD
Florentino Colindres	(Honduras)	TBD	TBD	TBD
Rafael Paciencia Núñez † (-2024)	(Honduras)	1999	June 2000	TBD
Francisco Rojas	(Nicaragua)	July 2000	August 2000	TBD
David Aquiles Medina	(Honduras)	September 2000	December 2000	TBD
Francisco Rojas	(Nicaragua)	2001	April 2002	TBD
Ramón Otoniel Olivas	(Nicaragua)	2002	December 2008	TBD
Roy Posas † (-2021)	(Honduras)	January 2009	December 2009	TBD
Ramón Otoniel Olivas	(Nicaragua)	December 2009	June 2018	7 Primera division (2009–10, 2010–11, 2011–12, 2012–13, 2013–14, 2015–16, 2016–17)
Washington Fernando Araújo	(Uruguay)	July 2018	December 2018	TBD
Sergio Rodríguez	(Nicaragua)	January 2019	November 2019	1 Primera division Title (2019 Clausura)
Holver Flores	(Nicaragua)	November 2019	June 2021	3 Primera division Title (2019 Apertura, Clausura 2020, Apertura 2020)
José Luis Trejo	(Mexico)	June 2021	May 2022	TBD
Ramón Otoniel Olivas	(Nicaragua)	June 2022	December 2025	2 Primera division Title (2022 Apertura,2023 Clausura); 2 runner up (2023 Central American Cup, 2024 CONCACAF Central American Cup)
Diego Vásquez	(Argentina)	December 2025	August 2026	1 Primera division Title (2026 Clausura)
Samuel Olivas	(Nicaragua)	September 2026	September 2026	1 Game
Marco Antonio Figueroa	(Chile)	September 2026	Present	

== Jersey sponsors ==
Period	Kit manufacturer	Shirt partner
1998–01	Galaxia	
2000–08	Galaxia	Enitel
2008–2011	Galaxia	Movistar; La Curaçao
2011–2017	Galaxia	Movistar; La Curaçao; Yahoo!
2017–2020	Kappa	Movistar; La Curaçao; Yahoo!
2021	Nil	Cafe Ox, Nicas
2022–2024	Keuka	Tigo, Cafe Ox
2024–2025	Orion Elite	Tigo, Cafe Ox, Baterías KOBE
2026–Present	Orion Elite	Tigo, Cafe Ox, Banpro, Doradobet, Flor de Cana

== Performance in CONCACAF competitions ==
- CONCACAF Champions Cup: 12 appearances

Best: Round of 16 in 2021
1991 : First Round
1992 : First Round
1996 : First Round
1998 : First Round
2008-09 : Preliminary Round
2011-12 : Preliminary Round
2012-13 : Group stage
2013-14 : Group stage
2014-15 : Group stage
2016-17 : Group stage
2021 : Round of 16
2024 : Round One
2025 : Round of 16

- CONCACAF League: 5 appearances

Best: Quarter-finals in 2020
2017 CONCACAF League: Round of 16
2019 CONCACAF League: Round of 16
2020 CONCACAF League: Quarter finals
2021 CONCACAF League: Round of 16
2022 CONCACAF League: Preliminary Round

- CONCACAF Central American Cup: 3 appearance

Best: Runner up in 2023 and 2024
2023 CONCACAF Central American Cup: Runner up
2024 CONCACAF Central American Cup: Runner up
2025 CONCACAF Central American Cup: Group stage

- Copa Interclubes UNCAF: 5 appearances

Best: Quarter-finals in 2004
2000 : First Round
2003 : First Round
2004 : Quarter-finals
2006 : First Round
2007 : First Round

=== Record versus other nations ===
As of 8 September 2025

The Concacaf opponents below = Official tournament results: (Plus a sampling of other results)

Opponent	Last Meeting	G	W	D	L	F	A	PTS	+/-
(El Salvador) Aguila	27 – August – 2025	3	2	0	1	3	1	6	+2
(Costa Rica) Alajuelense	5 – Dec – 2023	9	0	1	8	4	27	1	-23
(Panama) Árabe Unido	1996	2	0	1	1	1	2	1	-1
(El Salvador) Atlético Marte	15 – Dec – 1991	1	0	0	1	0	3	0	-3
(United States) Columbus Crew SC	15 – Apr – 2021	2	0	0	2	0	5	0	-5
(Mexico) Club América	14 – Feb – 2024	2	1	0	1	2	3	3	-1
(Guatemala) Comunicaciones	6 – Dec – 1991	1	0	0	1	0	15	0	-15
(United States) Dallas	24 – Aug – 2016	2	0	1	1	2	3	1	-1
(Nicaragua) Diriangén	2003	1	0	1	0	1	1	1	0
(El Salvador) FAS	15 – Aug – 2023	2	1	0	1	3	2	3	1
(El Salvador) Hércules	21 – August – 2025	1	1	0	0	3	0	3	+3
(Costa Rica) Herediano	24 – Nov – 2020	1	1	0	0	1	0	3	1
(Panama) Independiente	2 – Nov – 2023	3	1	1	1	4	4	4	0
(Honduras) Marathón	29 – Sept – 2021	2	1	0	1	2	2	3	0
(Canada) Montreal Impact	2 – Oct – 2008	2	0	1	1	0	1	1	-1
(Honduras) Motagua	10 – Dec – 2020	3	0	1	2	3	7	1	-4
(Honduras) Olimpia	30 – July – 2025	4	1	0	3	1	5	3	-4
(Honduras) Real España	4 – Aug – 2022	6	0	3	3	6	17	3	-11
(Costa Rica) Saprissa	4 – Oct – 2023	9	1	3	5	5	14	6	-9
(El Salvador) Santa Tecla	6 – Aug – 2019	2	1	0	1	2	2	1	0
(United States) Sporting Kansas City	23 – Sept – 2014	4	0	2	2	2	7	2	-5
(Guatemala) Suchitepéquez	13 – Sept – 2016	2	0	1	1	1	2	1	-1
(Panama) Tauro	1992	2	0	0	2	1	7	0	-6
(Canada) Toronto	2 – Aug – 2011	2	0	0	2	2	4	0	-2
(Mexico) UANL	12 – Feb – 2025	4	1	1	2	2	8	4	-6
(Guatemala) Xelajú	14 – August – 2025	2	1	0	1	2	4	3	-2
Totals		65	10	16	39	45	130	45	-85

== See also ==
- Real Estelí Baloncesto
