= Elmer Mejía =

Nicaraguan footballer (born 1978)

Elmer Mejia
Personal information
- Full name: Elmer Antonio Mejía Rodríguez
- Date of birth: 23 June 1978 (age 48)
- Place of birth: Comayagua, Honduras
- Position: Midfielder

Team information
- Current team: Real Estelí
- Number: 12

Senior career*
Years	Team	Apps	(Gls)
2000–2002	Motagua		
2004–2018	Real Estelí		(100)

International career^{‡}
2001	Honduras	1	(0)
2014	Nicaragua	4	(0)
- * Club domestic league appearances and goals ‡ National team caps and goals as of 11 August 2017

Elmer Antonio Mejía Rodríguez (born 23 June 1978) is a retired footballer who last played for Real Esteli in the Nicaraguan Primera División. Born in Honduras, he represented both Honduras and Nicaragua internationally.

== Club career ==
Mejía played for F.C. Motagua, with whom he won the 2001 Apertura, before moving abroad to become captain of Nicaraguan side Real Estelí. By 2012, Mejía had scored 100 goals for Estelí after winning the league's top goalscorer award with 14 goals. In 2007/08 he amassed 33 goals.

== International career ==
Mejía made his debut for Honduras in a July 2001 friendly match against Ecuador, which proved to be his sole international match.

== Honours ==
=== Titles ===
Season	Team	Title
Apertura 2001	Motagua	Liga Nacional de Honduras
Clausura 2004	Real Estelí	Primera División de Nicaragua
2007	Real Estelí	Primera División de Nicaragua
2008	Real Estelí	Primera División de Nicaragua
2009	Real Estelí	Primera División de Nicaragua
2010 Clausura	Real Estelí	Primera División de Nicaragua
2011 Clausura	Real Estelí	Primera División de Nicaragua
2011 Apertura	Real Estelí	Primera División de Nicaragua
