= América Managua =

Nicaraguan football club

Deportivo América
- Full name: Deportivo América Managua
- Nicknames: America (América) “Diablos Rojos (Red Devil)
- Founded: 1970
- Ground: Estadio Nacional; Managua, Nicaragua
- Capacity: 18,000
- Chairman: Carlos M Quintanilla
- Manager: Florencio Leiva
- League: 2da División Nacional
Home colours

América Managua is a Nicaraguan football team that last played at the local top level in the 2010–11 season.

== History ==
The club was founded in 1970 by Arturo Angarita Núñez, who grew in Colombia and a fan of América de Cali, so the club adopted the team colours of red and white, and develop the nicknames “Diablos Rojos”.

It is based in Managua.

They won their first league title in 1985 coached by Florencio Leiva, after just being promoted. It was the first time a newly promoted side won the Nicaraguan league title. They played in the second division for several years and almost disappeared due to bankruptcy. At the end of the 2004–2005 season, Deportivo América won promotion to the top division after beating Scorpión FC in the Second Division championship final.

In May 2011 the club decided not to show up for a replay against Real Madriz risking the chance of being expelled from Nicaraguan football. The replay was ordered by FENIFUT after Xilotepelt accused América chairman Eliécer Trillos of bribing the Madriz team who lost the game 1–7 to save América from relegation and sent Xilotepelt down on goal difference.

== Honours ==
- Primera División de Nicaragua: 3
  1985, 1988, 1990
- Segunda División de Nicaragua: 3
  1973, 1984, 20005

== List of managers ==
- (Costa Rica) José Antonio Pipa Cordero (1942–1946)
- (Nicaragua) Salvador Dubois Leiva
- (Nicaragua) Florencio Leiva (1985–1990, 2006)
- (Nicaragua) Eduardo "Quito" López (July 2006 – 2006)
- (Costa Rica) Glen Blanco (2007)
- (Colombia) Edison Oquendo (2008)
- (Nicaragua) Miguel Artola (2008)
- (Nicaragua) Martín Mena (2010–2011)
