= Estadio Cacique Diriangén =

Multi-purpose stadium in Diriamba, Nicaragua

Coordinates: 11°51′40″N 86°14′37″W

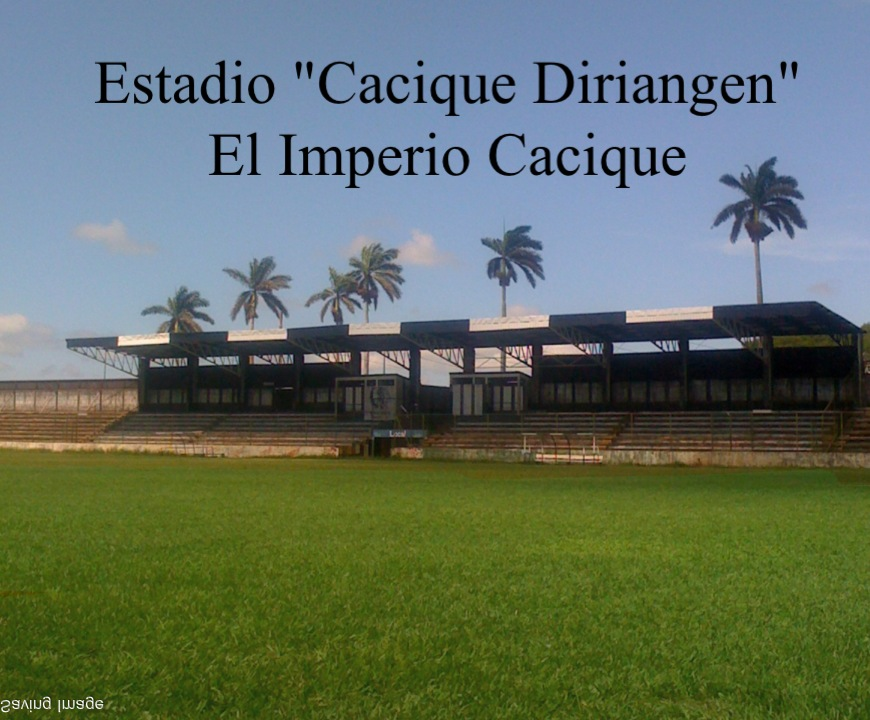
- Interactive map of Estadio Cacique Diriangén
- Location: Diriamba, Nicaragua
- Owner: Diriangen FC, FENIFUT
- Operator: FENIFUT
- Capacity: 7,500
- Surface: Natural turf
- Field size: 105 x 68 m

Construction
- Opened: 1992
- Renovated: 2017
- Architect: Violeta Chamorro

Tenants
- Diriangén FC (1992–present); Nicaragua national football team (1992–2011)

Estadio Cacique Diriangén is a multi-purpose stadium in Diriamba, Nicaragua.

It is currently used mostly for football matches and is the home stadium to Diriangén FC. The stadium holds 7,500 people.

In April 2012, it was announced the stadium was to be renovated.
