= Diriamba =

- Municipality
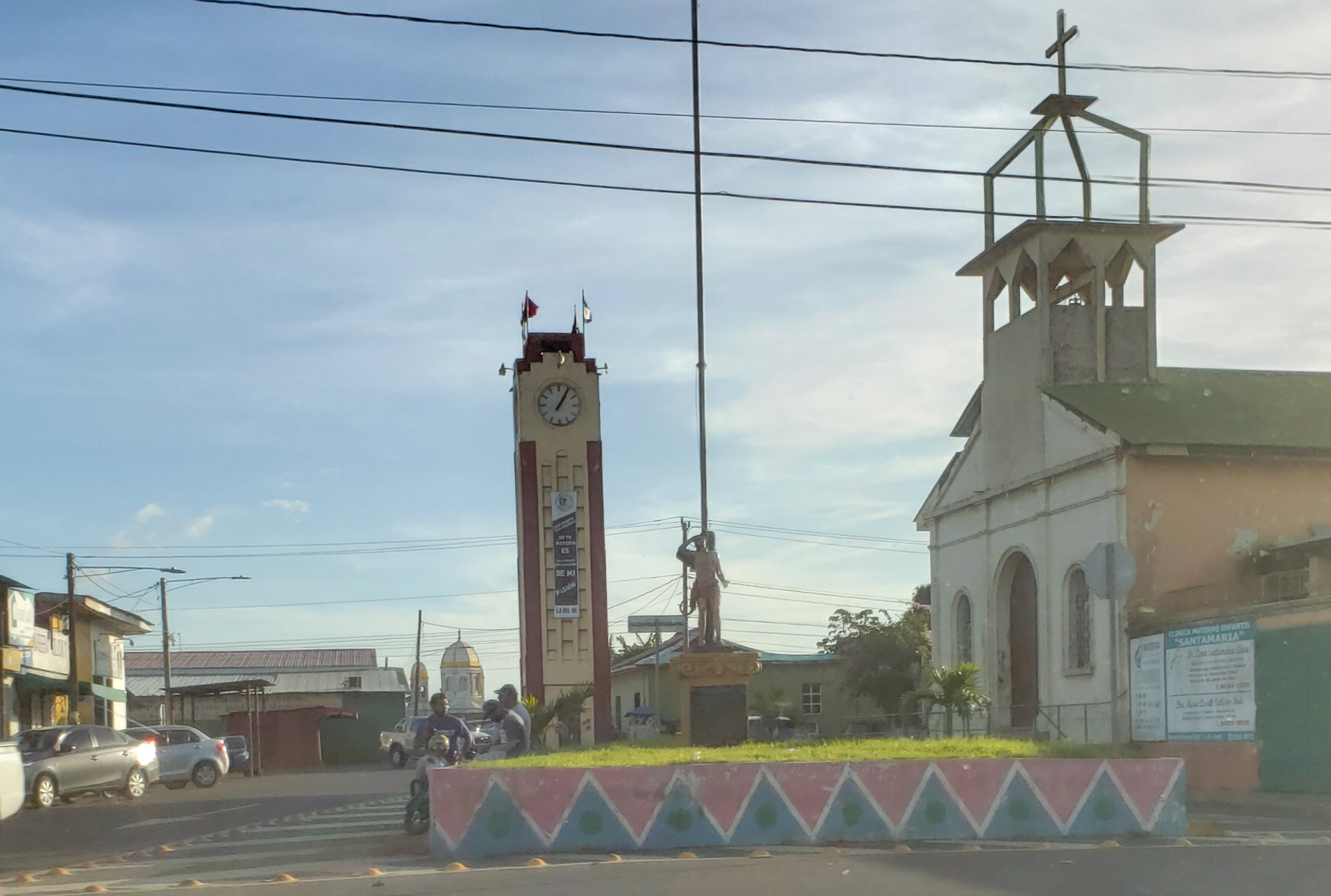

- Flag Seal
- Nicknames: Birthplace of the national football, of the national hipicas and of the Güegüense.
- Location in Nicaragua
- Coordinates: 11°51′N 86°14′W
- Country: Nicaragua
- Department: Carazo Department

Area
  - Land: 135 sq mi (349 km^{2})
- Elevation: 1,745 ft (532 m)

Population (2022 estimate)
  - Municipality: 65,243
  - Density: 479/sq mi (184.9/km^{2})
  - Urban: 44,294

Diriamba is a city and a municipality in the Carazo department of Nicaragua, with a population of 65,243 (2022 estimate). It is located 41 km south of Managua, the capital of Nicaragua.

== Geography ==
The city's elevation (just above 500 meters above sea level), and the geography of the cordillera upon which it sits, lend it a constantly mild weather (though notoriously windy January through March).

=== Climate ===
Managua, like much of Western Nicaragua except for the Sierras, has a tropical climate with constant temperatures averaging between 28 and 32 °C (82 and 90 °F). Under Köppen's climate classification, the city has a tropical wet and dry climate. A distinct dry season exists between November and April, while most of the rainfall is received between May and October. Temperatures are highest in March and April, when the sun lies directly overhead and the summer rainfall has yet to begin.

Climate data for Diriamba, Nicaragua
Month	Jan	Feb	Mar	Apr	May	Jun	Jul	Aug	Sep	Oct	Nov	Dec	Year
Mean daily maximum °C (°F)	31.0 (87.8)	32.1 (89.8)	33.6 (92.5)	34.3 (93.7)	34.0 (93.2)	31.4 (88.5)	30.9 (87.6)	31.4 (88.5)	30.3 (86.5)	30.8 (87.4)	30.6 (87.1)	30.8 (87.4)	31.8 (89.2)
Mean daily minimum °C (°F)	20.4 (68.7)	20.6 (69.1)	21.7 (71.1)	22.6 (72.7)	23.4 (74.1)	23.0 (73.4)	22.6 (72.7)	22.4 (72.3)	22.2 (72.0)	22.1 (71.8)	20.9 (69.6)	20.0 (68.0)	21.8 (71.2)
Average rainfall mm (inches)	9 (0.4)	5 (0.2)	3 (0.1)	8 (0.3)	130 (5.1)	224 (8.8)	144 (5.7)	136 (5.4)	215 (8.5)	280 (11.0)	42 (1.7)	8 (0.3)	1,204 (47.5)
Average rainy days (≥ 1.0 mm)	1	0	0	0	11	13	15	15	15	15	5	0	90
Average relative humidity (%)	69	64	62	61	70	80	79	81	82	83	78	73	74
Mean monthly sunshine hours	263.5	254.2	291.4	276.0	229.4	186.0	151.9	195.3	210.0	223.2	231.0	248.0	2,759.9
Source: Wetter Spiegel online

== Description ==
Diriamba is the largest city in Carazo. The Basilica of Saint Sebastian, which stores several antique objects, stands out within the central park of this urban area. Its streets show visitors the pretty facades of the houses and buildings, in addition to the iconic clock tower, famous for being a reference point for everyone in town.

An interesting site is the Dry Forest Ecological Museum. Here, visitors will find abundant information about the local flora and fauna. Another destination is the municipal football stadium, which functions as the headquarters of the football team 'Caciques de Diriangén', national league's champion on multiple times. Moreover, the House of Culture features many performances and art workshops.

Diriamba is also home to important manifestations of the Nicaraguan folklore. The religious festivities of the city, which are held from January 17 to 27 in honor of Saint Sebastian, are the perfect time to see them. The main dates happen to be the 19th and 20th, which is when visitors see the traditional dances of El Toro Huaco, El Viejo y la Vieja, Las Inditas, El Gigante and the renowned comedy-dance El Güegüense. The last one was declared Intangible Heritage of Humanity by UNESCO back in 2000.

The municipality also has a wide rural zone, constituted by 60 villages. There are a lot of coffee plantations, farms, and sites where tourists can observe nature. Such places are the La Maquina Ecotourism Center and the 'Salto de la Culebra', with its multiple ponds and waterfalls. La Boquita and Casares are another attraction in Diriamba. Tourists can get to both destinations very easily, by taking a road that leaves from the city center (30 kilometers). The first one, a sandy beach with rock formations, features multiple restaurants, bars, and hotels. Casares is located right next to it and also has rock zones and various summer private houses in front of the coast. It is also possible to buy fresh products from the fishermen of the area.

Because the urban area of Diriamba is crossed by the Panamerican highway, it is very easy to get here either by private or public transportation. The city is located 42 kilometers away from Managua. If you take the Carretera Sur, you will be in Diriamba in approximately half an hour. There are daily and frequent buses at the UCA bus station and the Israel Lewitez market.

Diriamba is also connected to Jinotepe and some other cities of the department of Masaya. You can also take buses, taxis or 'moto-taxis' to the beaches and other rural attractions of this municipality.

== Economy ==
Historically, Diriamba had mulberry plantations. British writer, John Baily, wrote in 1850 that the plantations lacked in management, and that great amounts of silk could be produced if more care was shown to the plantations.

== Attractions ==
Diriamba is home to three principal churches, one of them being La Basilica de San Sebastian, the foundation stone was laid out in 1891, but the Basilica was not inaugurated until 1939. Other important landmarks are the clock tower and the former site of the El Aguacate hydroelectric dam, now simply a waterfall.

They have other attractions such as: Casares Beach, Centro Turistico La Maquina, La boquita beach, Ecologic museum dry tropic, Salto de la culebra waterfall.

== Sports ==
The city is home to Nicaragua's most successful football club, Diriangén. They play at the Estadio Cacique Diriangén, located northwest of the city center.

== Notable natives and residents ==
- Sheynnis Palacios, Miss Universe 2023; grew up in Diriamba
