= Otoniel Olivas =

Nicaraguan football manager and former player

Personal information
- Date of birth: 28 February 1968 (age 58)
- Place of birth: Estelí, Nicaragua
- Position: Defender

Senior career*
Years	Team	Apps	(Gls)
1984–1991	Real Estelí		(62)
1991–1993	Atlético Indio		
1994–1999	Real Estelí		

International career
1992–1999	Nicaragua	11	(0)

Managerial career
- 2002–2009: Real Estelí
- 2008–2009: Nicaragua
- 2009–2018: Real Estelí
- 2022–2025: Real Esteli
- 2026: Nicaragua (caretaker)
- * Club domestic league appearances and goals

Ramón Otoniel Olivas Ruiz (born 28 February 1968) is a Nicaraguan football manager and former player.

From 2008 to 2009 he was the head coach the Nicaragua national football team. He was also the caretaker manager of the national team in 2026.

== Club career ==
During his career he played for Real Estelí for whom he scored 62 goals in 16 years in Nicaragua, Atlético Indio in Honduras and Atlético Marte in El Salvador. He is considered one of the best central defenders to have played in and for Nicaragua.

== International career ==
Olivas made his debut for Nicaragua in a July 1992 FIFA World Cup qualification match against El Salvador and has earned a total of 11 caps, scoring no goals. He has represented his country in 4 FIFA World Cup qualification matches and played at the 1993, 1995, 1997 and 1999 UNCAF Nations Cups.

His final international was a March 1999 UNCAF Nations Cup match against El Salvador.

== Managerial career ==
Olivas has managed Real Estelí since 2003, but was appointed national team manager for the 2009 UNCAF Nations Cup.

=== Titles ===
Season	Team	Title
2002-03	Real Estelí	Primera División de Nicaragua
2003-04	Real Estelí	Primera División de Nicaragua
2006-07	Real Estelí	Primera División de Nicaragua
2007-08	Real Estelí	Primera División de Nicaragua
2008-09	Real Estelí	Primera División de Nicaragua
2009-10	Real Estelí	Primera División de Nicaragua
2010-11	Real Estelí	Primera División de Nicaragua
2011-12	Real Estelí	Primera División de Nicaragua
2012-13	Real Estelí	Primera División de Nicaragua
2013-14	Real Estelí	Primera División de Nicaragua
2015-16	Real Estelí	Primera División de Nicaragua
2016-17	Real Estelí	Primera División de Nicaragua
Apertura 2022	Real Estelí	Primera División de Nicaragua
Clausura 2023	Real Estelí	Primera División de Nicaragua
2023	Real Estelí	Copa de Nicaragua

== Personal life ==
His brother, Samuel Olivas, also played for the national team.
