= Estadio Independencia (Nicaragua) =

Nicaraguan stadium

Coordinates: 13°05′52″N 86°21′11″W

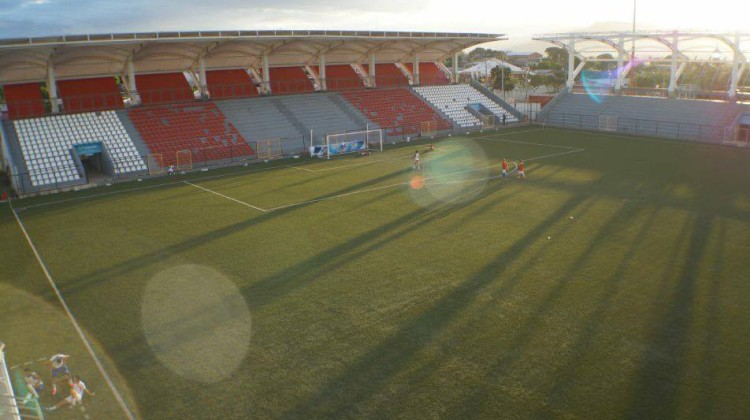
- Interactive map of Estadio Independencia
- Location: Estelí, Nicaragua
- Owner: Real Esteli FC, City of Esteli
- Operator: Real Esteli FC
- Capacity: 11,000
- Surface: Artificial Turf
- Field size: 105 x 68 m

Construction
- Groundbreaking: 1961
- Opened: ?
- Renovated: 2012

Tenant
- Real Estelí FC

Estadio Independencia is a multi-use stadium in Estelí, Nicaragua. It is used for football matches and is the home stadium of Real Estelí.

The stadium holds 5,000 people, and was renovated and equipped with synthetic turf to be used by Real Estelí for their home matches in the group stage of the 2012–13 CONCACAF Champions League and beyond.

== Hooliganism ==
In April 2004, an explosive went off in the stands during the national football league final between Real Estelí and Diriangén, seriously injuring 14 people.
