= Xilotepelt FC =

Xilotepelt F.C.
- Full name: Xilotepelt Futbol Clube
- Nickname: "Xilo"
- Founded: 1996
- Dissolved: 2013
- Ground: Estadio Municipal de Jinotepe; Jinotepe, Nicaragua
- Capacity: 12,000
- Chairman: Ewner Zuniga
- Manager: Eduardo Correa
- League: 2DA Division
- Clausura 2025: 4
Home colours

Xilotepelt was a Nicaraguan football team. The team is based in Jinotepe.

== History ==
The team has played in the Primera División de Nicaragua but was relegated following the 2013 Nicaraguan Clausura. In August 2013, the football association decided not to allow Xilotepelt to the second division after a merger with UCEM failed to materialise.

== Notable players ==
Players whose name is listed in bold represented their countries while playing for Xilotepelt

- (Nicaragua) Milton Busto (2009–2011)
- (Nicaragua) Emilio Palacios (2008–2012)

== Notable coaches ==
- (Nicaragua) Martin Mena (2009 – Jun 2010–2011)
- (Mexico) Abel Núñez (July 2010 – Sep 2010)
- (Argentina) Néstor Holwegger (Sep 2010 – Oct 2010)
- (Nicaragua) Emilio Palacios (Oct 2010 – Dec 2010)
- (Honduras) Miguel Ángel Palacios (Jan 2011–)
- (Nicaragua) Luis "Guicho" Díaz (2012 – July 2012)
- (Nicaragua) Martin Mena (July 2012 – December 2012)
- (El Salvador) Angel Orellana (Jan 2013 – Feb 2013)
- (Nicaragua) Luis Diaz (2025 - Present)
