= List of Nicaraguan football champions =

The Nicaraguan Football Champion is the winner of the Nicaragua National Football Championship Currently, there are two champions each calendar year with one champion for the Apertura season and one for the Clausura season.

== List of champions year by year ==
| Date | Winner | Runner-up |
|---|---|---|
| 1933 | Alas Managua | ? |
| 1934 | Club Atletico Managua | ? |
| 1935−1938 | No Championship was played | |
| 1939 | Lido | ? |
| 1940 | Diriangén FC | ? |
| 1941 | Diriangén FC | ? |
| 1942 | Diriangén FC | ? |
| 1943 | Diriangén FC | ? |
| 1944 | Diriangén FC | ? |
| 1945 | Diriangén FC | ? |
| 1946 | Ferrocarril | ? |
| 1947 | Colegio C-A | ? |
| 1948 | Ferrocarril | Diriangén FC |
| 1949 | Diriangén FC | ? |
| 1950 | Aduana | ? |
| 1951 | Aduana | ? |
| 1952 | No Championship was played | |
| 1953 | Diriangén FC | ? |
| 1954 | La Salle | ? |
| 1955 | Aduana | ? |
| 1956 | Diriangén FC | ? |
| 1957 | No Championship was played | |
| 1958 | Club Atletico Managua | ? |
| 1959 | Diriangén FC | ? |
| 1960 | La Nica | ? |
| 1961 | Deportivo Santa Cecilia | ? |
| 1962−1964 | No Championship was played | |
| 1965 | Deportivo Santa Cecilia | ? |
| 1966 | Flor de Caña FC | ? |
| 1967 | Flor de Caña FC | ? |
| 1968 | Universidad Centroamericana | ? |
| 1969 | Diriangén FC | ? |
| 1970 | Diriangén FC | ? |
| 1971 | Deportivo Santa Cecilia | ? |
| 1972 | Deportivo Santa Cecilia | ? |
| 1973 | Deportivo Santa Cecilia | ? |
| 1974 | Diriangén FC | ? |
| 1975 | Universidad Centroamericana | ? |
| 1976 | Universidad Centroamericana | ? |
| 1977 | Universidad Centroamericana | ? |
| 1978−1979 | No Championship was played | |
| 1980 | Bufalos | ? |
| 1981 | Diriangén FC | ? |
| 1982 | Diriangén FC | ? |
| 1983 | Diriangén FC | ? |
| 1984 | Deportivo Masaya | ? |
| 1985 | America Managua | Diriangén FC |
| 1986 | Deportivo Masaya | ? |
| 1987 | Diriangén FC | America Managua |
| 1988 | America Managua | Diriangén FC |
| 1989 | Diriangén FC | ? |
| 1990 | America Managua | Deportivo Walter Ferretti |
| 1991 | Real Estelí | Diriangén FC |
| 1992 | Diriangén FC | ? |
| 1993 | Juventus Managua | ? |
| 1994 | Juventus Managua | ? |
| 1994−95 | Diriangén FC | Real Estelí |
| 1995−96 | Diriangén FC | Bautista |
| 1996−97 | Diriangén FC | Real Estelí |
| 1997−98 | Deportivo Walter Ferretti | Masachapa |
| 1998−99 | Real Estelí | Diriangén FC |
| 1999−2000 | Diriangén FC | Deportivo Walter Ferretti |
| 2000−01 | Deportivo Walter Ferretti | Diriangén FC |
| 2001−02 | Deportivo Jalapa | Deportivo Walter Ferretti |
| 2002−03 | Real Estelí | Diriangén FC |
| 2003 Apertura | Real Estelí | Diriangén FC |
| 2004 Clausura | Real Estelí | Diriangén FC |
| 2004 Apertura | Diriangén FC | ? |
| 2005 Clausura | Diriangén FC | Real Estelí |
| 2005−06 | Diriangén FC | Real Estelí |
| 2006−07 | Real Estelí | Real Madriz |
| 2007−08 | Real Estelí | Deportivo Walter Ferretti |
| 2008−09 | Real Estelí | ? |
| 2009 Apertura | Deportivo Walter Ferretti | ? |
| 2010 Clausura | Real Estelí | ? |
| 2010 Apertura | Deportivo Walter Ferretti | Diriangén FC |
| 2011 Clausura | Real Estelí | Deportivo Walter Ferretti |
| 2011 Apertura | Real Estelí | Deportivo Walter Ferretti |
| 2012 Clausura | Real Estelí | Diriangén FC |
| 2012 Apertura | Real Estelí | Deportivo Walter Ferretti |
| 2013 Clausura | Real Estelí | Deportivo Walter Ferretti |
| 2013 Apertura | Real Estelí | Deportivo Walter Ferretti |
| 2014 Clausura | Real Estelí | Diriangén FC |
| 2014 Apertura | Deportivo Walter Ferretti | Real Estelí |
| 2015 Clausura | Real Estelí | Diriangén FC |
| 2015 Apertura | UNAN Managua | Diriangén FC |
| 2016 Clausura | Real Estelí | Deportivo Walter Ferretti |
| 2016 Apertura | Real Estelí | Deportivo Walter Ferretti |
| 2017 Clausura | Real Estelí | Deportivo Walter Ferretti |
| 2017 Apertura | Deportivo Walter Ferretti | Managua F.C. |
| 2018 Clausura | Diriangén FC | Real Estelí |
| 2018 Apertura | Managua F.C. | Real Estelí |
| 2019 Clausura | Real Estelí | Managua F.C. |
| 2019 Apertura | Real Estelí | Managua F.C. |
| 2020 Clausura | Real Estelí | Managua F.C. |
| 2020 Apertura | Real Estelí | Diriangén FC |
| 2021 Clausura | Diriangén FC | Managua F.C. |
| 2021 Apertura | Diriangén FC | Real Estelí |
| 2022 Clausura | Diriangén FC | Deportivo Walter Ferretti |
| 2023 Apertura | Real Estelí | Diriangén FC |
| 2023 Clausura | Real Estelí | Deportivo Walter Ferretti |
| 2023 Apertura | Diriangén FC | Real Estelí |
| 2024 Clausura | Diriangén FC | Real Estelí |
| 2024 Apertura | Diriangén FC | Real Estelí |
| 2025 Clausura | Managua F.C. | Real Estelí |
| 2025 Apertura | Diriangén FC | Managua F.C. |
| 2026 Clausura | Real Estelí FC | Diriangén FC |
| 2026 Apertura | TBD | TBD |
| 2027 Clausura | TBD | TBD |

== Champions ==
Teams in bold are currently participating in Primera División de Nicaragua.

| Club | Winners | Runners-up | Winning years |
|---|---|---|---|
| **Diriangén** | 33 | 9 | 1940, 1941, 1942, 1943, 1944, 1945, 1949, 1953, 1956, 1959, 1969, 1970, 1974, 1981, 1982, 1983, 1987, 1989, 1992, 1994−95, 1995−96, 1996−97, 1999−2000, 2004 Apertura, 2005 Clausura, 2005−06, Clausura 2018, 2021 Clausura, 2021 Apertura, Clausura 2022, 2023 Apertura, Clausura 2024, Apertura 2024 |
| **Real Estelí** | 21 | 10 | 1991, 1998−99, 2002−03, 2003 Apertura, 2004 Clausura, 2006−07, 2007−08, 2008−09, 2009−10, 2010−11, 2011−12, 2012−13, 2013−14, 2015−16, 2016−17, 2019 Clausura, 2019 Apertura, 2020 Clausura, 2020 Apertura, 2022 Apertura, 2023 Clausura |
| Deportivo Santa Cecilia | 5 | − | 1961, 1965, 1971, 1972, 1973 |
| **Walter Ferretti** | 4 | 13 | 1997−98, 2000−01, 2014−15, 2017 Apertura |
| UCA | 4 | − | 1968, 1975, 1976, 1977 |
| América Managua | 3 | 3 | 1985, 1988, 1990 |
| Aduana | 3 | − | 1950, 1951, 1955 |
| Ferrocarril | 2 | − | 1946, 1948 |
| Flor de Caña | 2 | − | 1966, 1967 |
| Deportivo Masaya | 2 | 1 | 1984, 1986 |
| Juventus Managua | 2 | 2 | 1993, 1994 |
| Atlético | 2 | − | 1934, 1958 |
| **Managua** | 2 | 4 | 2018 Apertura, Clausura 2025 |
| Deportivo Jalapa | 1 | 1 | 2001−02 |
| Búfalos | 1 | − | 1980 |
| La Nica | 1 | − | 1960 |
| Alas | 1 | − | 1933 |
| Lido | 1 | − | 1939 |
| Colegio Centroamérica | 1 | − | 1947 |
| **UNAN Managua** | 1 | − | 2015 Apertura |

== See also ==
- Nicaraguan Primera División
