= 2019–20 Liga Primera =

Liga Primera
- Season: 2019–20
- Champions: Apertura: Real Estelí; Clausura: Real Estelí
- Relegated: Deportivo Las Sabanas
- CONCACAF League: Real Estelí; Managua
- Matches: 196
- Goals: 459 (2.34 per match)
- Top goalscorer: Apertura: (Mexico) Carlos Félix (10 goals); Clausura: (Mexico) Fernando Villalpando (10 goals)
- Biggest home win: Apertura: Managua 5–0 Real Madriz (26 October 2019); Clausura: Walter Ferretti 7–0 Chinandega (29 March 2020)
- Biggest away win: Apertura: Chinandega 1–4 Real Estelí (15 September 2019); Chinandega 0–3 Deportivo Las Sabanas (6 October 2019); Clausura: Real Madriz 0–2 Real Estelí (25 January 2020); Real Estelí 0–2 Managua (8 February 2020); Deportivo Las Sabanas 0–2 Walter Ferretti (15 March 2020); Chinandega 1–3 Real Estelí (12 April 2020)
- Highest scoring: Apertura: Managua 3–3 Chinandega (16 October 2019); Walter Ferretti 5–1 Deportivo Ocotal (9 November 2019); Clausura: Walter Ferretti 7–0 Chinandega (29 March 2020)
- All statistics correct as of 9 May 2020.

The 2019–20 Liga Primera de Nicaragua season was divided into two tournaments (Apertura and Clausura) and will determine the 73rd and 74th champions in the history of the Liga Primera de Nicaragua, the top division of football in Nicaragua. The Apertura tournament was played in the second half of 2019, while the Clausura was played in the first half of 2020.

The league was one of the few football leagues in the world, along with the Belarus, Tajikistan that did not suspend their season due to the COVID-19 pandemic.

== Format ==
The Apertura play-off format was changed from previous years, while the Clausura will use the same 4-team play-off format. For the Apertura, the top four teams from the regular stage advanced to a "quadrangular" double-round robin instead of a play-off stage. The regular stage and quadrangular winners would have played to decide the tournament's champion, but ultimately the same team won both and the final was not necessary. The same format was recently adopted by the Costa Rican Primera División, but for both half seasons.

== Team information ==
A total of ten teams contested the league, including nine sides from the 2018–19 Primera División, and one side from the 2018–19 Segunda División.

UNAN Managua finished last in the aggregate table and were relegated to the Segunda División. The champions from the Segunda División, Deportivo Las Sabanas were promoted in their place.

The 9th place team in the aggregate table, Chinandega FC, faced the second place team from the Segunda División, FC Gutiérrez, in a playoff for a spot in the Primera División. Chinandega won 4–3 over two legs, meaning Chinandega remained in Primera División.

=== Promotion and relegation ===
Promoted from Segunda División as of July, 2019.

- Champions: Deportivo Las Sabanas

Relegated to Segunda División as of July, 2019.

- Last Place: UNAN Managua

=== Stadia and locations ===
Locations of the 2019–20 Liga Primera teams

Team	Location	Stadium	Capacity
Chinandega	Chinandega	Estadio Efraín Tijerino	3,000
Deportivo Las Sabanas	Las Sabanas	Municipal de Las Sabanas	1,000
Deportivo Ocotal	Ocotal	Estadio Roy Fernando Bermúdez	3,000
Diriangén	Diriamba	Estadio Cacique Diriangén	8,500
Juventus Managua	Managua	Estadio Olímpico del IND Managua	15,000
Managua	Managua	Estadio Olímpico del IND Managua	15,000
Municipal Jalapa	Jalapa	Estadio Alejandro Ramos	1,000
Real Estelí	Estelí	Estadio Independencia	5,000
Real Madriz	Somoto	Estadio Solidaridad	3,000
Walter Ferretti	Managua	Estadio Olímpico del IND Managua	15,000

== Managerial changes ==
=== During the Apertura season ===
Team	Outgoing manager	Manner of departure	Date of vacancy	Replaced by	Date of appointment	Position in table
Diriangen FC	(Nicaragua) Mauricio Cruz	Sacked	September 2019	(Brazil) Flavio da Silva	September 2019	9th (Apertura 2019)
CD Ocotal	(Nicaragua) Mario Alfaro	Sacked	October 2019	(Honduras) Marcos Rivera (Interim)	October 2019	10th (Apertura 2019)
CD Ocotal	(Honduras) Marcos Rivera	Interimship finished	October 2019	(Honduras) Reynaldo Clavasquín	October 2019	10th (Apertura 2019)
ART Jalapa	(Nicaragua) Leonidas Rodríguez	Sacked	October 2019	(El Salvador) Angel Orellana	October 2019	9th (Apertura 2019)
Real Esteli	(Nicaragua) Sergio Ivan Rodriguez	Resigned	November 2019	(Nicaragua) Holver Flores ‘’’Interim’’’	November 2019	3rd (Apertura 2019)
Real Madriz	(Nicaragua) Miguel Angel Sanchez	Resigned	November 2019	(Nicaragua) Carlos Matamoros ‘’’Interim’’’	November 2019	9th (Apertura 2019)

=== Between the Aperutra and Clasura season ===
Team	Outgoing manager	Manner of departure	Date of vacancy	Replaced by	Date of appointment	Position in table
Juventus Managua	(Argentina) Roberto Armando Chanampe	Sacked	December 2019	(Honduras) Héctor Medina	December 2019	TBD (Apertura 2019)
Real Madriz	(Nicaragua) Carlos Matamoros	Interimship finished	December 2019	(Panama) Juan Ramirez	January 2020	TBD (Apertura 2019)

== Apertura ==
=== Personnel and sponsoring ===
Team	Manager	Captain	Kit manufacturer	Kit sponsors
ART Municipal Jalapa	(Nicaragua) Leonidas Rodríguez	(Nicaragua) Luis Manuel Galeano	Joma	Agrotris
Chinandega	(Nicaragua) Reyna Espinoza	(Nicaragua) Lester Espinoza	Nil	Nil
Diriangén FC	(Nicaragua) Mauricio Cruz	(Nicaragua) Jason Coronel	Joma	Claro, Ocal, Victoria frost
Juventus Managua	(Argentina) Roberto Chanampe	(Honduras) Darwin Guity	TBD	TBD
Managua	(Nicaragua) Emilio Aburto	(Brazil) Cristiano Fernández da Lima	Joma	Brini
Ocotal	(Nicaragua) Mario Alfaro	(Nicaragua) Guillermo Espino	Nil	Alcadia Ocotal
Real Estelí	(Nicaragua) Sergio Ivan Rodriguez	(Nicaragua) Jason Casco	Kappa	Beco, Movi star, La Curaçao, Banpro, Vitalsis
Real Madriz	(Nicaragua) Miguel Angel Sanchez	(Nicaragua) Alvaro Bermúdez	TBD	Alcadia Somoto
Deportivo Las Sabanas	(Nicaragua) Luis Vega	(Nicaragua) Marvin Fletes	Joma	Nil
Walter Ferretti	(Nicaragua) Henry Urbina	(Nicaragua) René Huete	Umbro	Claro, Iniser, Disnorte Dissur

=== Standings ===
Pos	Team	Pld	W	D	L	GF	GA	GD	Pts	Qualification or relegation
1	Walter Ferretti	18	9	6	3	23	14	+9	33	Advance to Playoffs (Semifinals)
2	Diriangén	18	9	5	4	25	15	+10	32	Advance to Playoffs (Semifinals)
3	Real Estelí	18	8	4	6	26	14	+12	28	Advance to Playoffs (Quarterfinals)
4	Managua	18	7	6	5	35	25	+10	27	Advance to Playoffs (Quarterfinals)
5	Juventus Managua	18	6	6	6	21	18	+3	24	Advance to Playoffs (Quarterfinals)
6	Deportivo Las Sabanas	18	6	5	7	17	21	−4	23	Advance to Playoffs (Quarterfinals)
7	Chinandega	18	6	4	8	17	30	−13	22	
8	Deportivo Ocotal	18	5	6	7	18	26	−8	21	
9	Real Madriz	18	3	10	5	17	25	−8	19	
10	Municipal Jalapa	18	2	6	10	12	23	−11	12	

Source: Soccerway
Rules for classification: 1) points; 2) goal difference; 3) number of goals scored; 4) head-to-head points; 5) head-to-head goal difference; 6) head-to-head goals scored; 7) draw.

=== Results ===
Home \ Away	CHI	DLS	DPO	DIR	JVM	MAN	MCJ	REE	RMA	WAF
Chinandega	—	0–3	2–1	0–2	1–0	0–1	2–1	1–4	2–1	1–1
Deportivo Las Sabanas	1–0	—	0–1	1–1	0–0	4–1	3–0	1–0	0–2	1–2
Deportivo Ocotal	3–0	1–1	—	1–2	2–0	1–1	2–1	0–0	1–1	1–2
Diriangén	0–1	4–0	0–0	—	2–1	2–2	2–0	2–0	2–0	0–0
Juventus Managua	1–1	0–1	4–0	3–1	—	1–1	1–0	1–0	3–0	0–2
Managua	3–3	4–0	3–0	2–0	2–2	—	4–1	0–3	5–0	0–1
Municipal Jalapa	2–0	1–1	0–1	0–0	1–2	1–2	—	0–0	1–1	0–1
Real Estelí	4–0	3–0	2–0	3–1	2–0	2–1	0–2	—	1–1	0–1
Real Madriz	1–1	0–0	2–2	0–1	1–1	2–2	1–1	2–1	—	2–1
Walter Ferretti	1–2	1–0	5–1	1–3	1–1	2–1	0–0	1–1	0–0	—

Source: Soccerway
Legend: Blue = home team win; Yellow = draw; Red = away team win.

=== Finals ===
==== Bracket ====
Quarterfinals
4	Managua (p)	0 (7)
5	Juventus Managua	0 (6)
3	Real Esteli	1
6	Las Sabanas	0

Semi-finals
4	Managua (p)	2	2	4 (5)
1	Walter Ferretti	2	2	4 (3)
3	Real Esteli (a.e.t.)	0	1	1
2	Diriangén	0	1	1

Finals
4	Managua	1	0	1
3	Real Esteli (a.e.t.)	0	2	2

Key: (a) = Wins because of away goals rule, (a.e.t.) = Wins after extra time in second leg, (p) = Wins after penalty shoot-out.

==== Quarterfinals ====
30 November 2019

Managua	0 – 0	Juventus Managua
Penalties
	7 – 6

Estadio Nacional, Managua

Managua progressed.

30 November 2019

Real Esteli	1 – 0	Las Sabanas
Vinicius Da Souza 40'

Estadio Independencia, Estelí

Real Estelí progressed.

==== Semi-finals ====
Team 1	Agg.	Team 2	1st leg	2nd leg
Real Esteli	1–1 (a)	Diriangén	0–0	1–1
Managua F.C.	4–4 (5–3 p)	Walter Ferretti	2–2	2–2 (a.e.t.)

6 December 2019

Real Esteli	0 – 0	Diriangén

Estadio Independencia, Esteli

9 December 2019

Diriangén	1 – 1	Real Esteli
Luis Coronel 26'		Ayerdis 36'

Estadio Cacique, Diriangén
Referee: Rodolfo Paiz

1–1, Real Estelí won on away goals.

5 December 2019

Managua F.C.	2 – 2	Walter Ferretti
Christiano Fernandez 17'; Carlos Felix 67'		Rene Huete 14'; Leandro Figueroa 59'

9 December 2019

Walter Ferretti	2 – 2	Managua F.C.
Pedro Dos Santos 55'; Dshon Forbes 92'		Christiano Fernandez 70'; Erick Mendoza 85'

Estadio Nacional, Managua

4–4, Managua won 5–3 on penalties.

==== Final ====
16 December 2019
6:00pm

Managua F.C.	1 – 0	Real Esteli
Pablo Gallego 32'

Estadio Nacional, Managua
Referee: Bayardo Ulises Juárez

21 December 2019
7:00pm

Real Esteli	2 – 0 (a.e.t.)	Managua F.C.
Jaime Ayala 37'; Ricardo Rivas 98'

Estadio Independencia, Esteli
Referee: Nitzar Sandoval

Real Estelí won 2–1 on aggregate.

Apertura 2019 champions

15th title

=== Statistics ===
==== Top scorers ====
Rank	Player	Club	Goals
1.	(Mexico) Carlos Félix	Managua	10
2.	(Brazil) Robinson Luiz	Juventus Managua	7
2.	(Nicaragua) Ulises Rayo	Real Madriz	7
4.	(Brazil) Christiano	Managua	6
4.	(Nicaragua) Luis Galeano	Municipal Jalapa	6
4.	(Spain) Pablo Gállego	Managua	6
4.	(Nicaragua) Eulises Pavón	Juventus Managua	6

==== Records ====
- Top goalscorer: Mexican Carlos Felix (10 goals)
- Most goals scored: Managua FC (35 goals)
- Fewest goals scored: ART Jalapa (12 goals)
- Fewest goals conceded : Walter Ferretti and Real Esteli (14 goals)
- Most goals conceded : Chinandega (30 goals)

== Clausura ==
=== Personnel and sponsoring ===
Team	Manager	Captain	Kit manufacturer	Kit sponsors
ART Municipal Jalapa	(El Salvador) Angel Orellana	(Nicaragua) Luis Manuel Galeano	Joma	Agrotris
Chinandega	(Nicaragua) Reyna Espinoza	(Nicaragua) Lester Espinoza	Nil	Nil
Diriangén FC	(Brazil) Flavio da Silva	(Nicaragua) Jason Coronel	Joma	Claro, Ocal, Victoria frost
Juventus Managua	(Honduras) Hector Medina	(Honduras) Darwin Guity	TBD	TBD
Managua	(Nicaragua) Emilio Aburto	(Brazil) Cristiano Fernández da Lima	Joma	Brini
Ocotal	(Honduras) Reynaldo Clavasquín	(Nicaragua) Guillermo Espino	Nil	Alcadia Ocotal
Real Estelí	(Nicaragua) Holver Flores	(Nicaragua) Jason Casco	Kappa	Beco, Movi star, La Curaçao, Banpro, Vitalsis
Real Madriz	(Panama) Juan Ramirez	(Nicaragua) Alvaro Bermúdez	TBD	Alcadia Somoto
Deportivo Las Sabanas	(Nicaragua) Luis Vega	(Nicaragua) Marvin Fletes	Joma	Nil
Walter Ferretti	(Nicaragua) Henry Urbina	(Nicaragua) René Huete	Umbro	Claro, Iniser, Disnorte Dissur

=== Standings ===
Pos	Team	Pld	W	D	L	GF	GA	GD	Pts	Qualification or relegation
1	Managua	18	13	3	2	34	15	+19	42	Advance to Playoffs (Semifinals)
2	Real Estelí	18	10	5	3	29	11	+18	35	Advance to Playoffs (Semifinals)
3	Diriangén	18	10	5	3	22	11	+11	35	Advance to Playoffs (Quarterfinals)
4	Walter Ferretti	18	9	3	6	31	18	+13	30	Advance to Playoffs (Quarterfinals)
5	Municipal Jalapa	18	6	5	7	17	21	−4	23	Advance to Playoffs (Quarterfinals)
6	Juventus Managua	18	5	6	7	23	23	0	21	Advance to Playoffs (Quarterfinals)
7	Chinandega	18	5	3	10	18	31	−13	18	
8	Real Madriz	18	5	2	11	15	27	−12	17	
9	Deportivo Ocotal	18	4	4	10	14	26	−12	16	
10	Deportivo Las Sabanas	18	2	6	10	11	31	−20	12	

Source: Soccerway
Rules for classification: 1) points; 2) goal difference; 3) number of goals scored; 4) head-to-head points; 5) head-to-head goal difference; 6) head-to-head goals scored; 7) draw.

=== Results ===
Home \ Away	CHI	DLS	DPO	DIR	JVM	MAN	MCJ	REE	RMA	WAF
Chinandega	—	3–0	2–3	0–1	4–0	0–1	1–0	1–3	2–1	1–1
Deportivo Las Sabanas	1–1	—	0–0	1–1	1–1	0–1	0–0	1–2	2–1	0–2
Deportivo Ocotal	1–0	1–1	—	0–0	0–0	3–1	1–2	1–2	0–1	0–1
Diriangén	3–0	1–2	2–0	—	1–0	2–0	0–0	2–0	3–1	2–1
Juventus Managua	1–1	5–0	0–1	3–0	—	1–2	3–2	0–0	2–0	4–1
Managua	1–0	4–1	2–1	2–1	4–2	—	6–1	1–1	3–1	1–0
Municipal Jalapa	0–1	1–0	2–1	0–0	2–0	1–1	—	1–2	1–0	2–0
Real Estelí	5–1	1–0	5–0	0–0	0–0	0–2	2–0	—	4–0	0–0
Real Madriz	2–0	4–1	2–0	0–1	0–0	0–0	1–0	0–2	—	1–2
Walter Ferretti	7–0	2–0	2–1	1–2	4–1	0–1	2–2	1–0	4–0	—

Source: Soccerway
Legend: Blue = home team win; Yellow = draw; Red = away team win.

=== Finals ===
==== Bracket ====
Quarterfinals
3	Diriangén	1
6	Juventus Managua	0
4	Walter Ferretti	5
5	Municipal Jalapa	1

Semi-finals
3	Diriangén	0	0	0
2	Real Estelí	1	0	1
4	Walter Ferretti	0	2	2
1	Managua	0	4	4

Finals
2	Real Estelí	1	3	4
1	Managua	1	1	2

Key: (a) = Wins because of away goals rule, (a.e.t.) = Wins after extra time in second leg, (p) = Wins after penalty shoot-out.

==== Quarterfinals ====
22 April 2020

Diriangén	1 – 0	Juventus Managua
Laureiro 63'

Diriangén progressed.

22 April 2020

Walter Ferretti	5 – 1	Municipal Jalapa
Forbes 7', 48', 53'; García 45'; Figueroa 90+2'		Galeano 52' (pen.)

Walter Ferretti progressed.

==== Semi-finals ====
Team 1	Agg.	Team 2	1st leg	2nd leg
Diriangén	0–1	Real Estelí	0–1	0–0
Walter Ferretti	2–4	Managua	0–0	2–4

25 April 2020

Diriangén	0 – 1	Real Estelí
		Acevedo 74'

29 April 2020

Real Estelí	0 – 0	Diriangén

Real Estelí won 1–0 on aggregate.

26 April 2020

Walter Ferretti	0 – 0	Managua

29 April 2020

Managua	4 – 2	Walter Ferretti
Quinto 3'; Villalpando 21' (o.g.); Peralta 70'; Gállego 83'		Villalpando 7'; Calero 24'

Managua won 4–2 on aggregate.

==== Final ====
2 May 2020

Real Estelí	1 – 1	Managua
López 64'		Gállego 69'

9 May 2020

Managua	1 – 3	Real Estelí
Félix 84'		Rosas 48'; Ayerdis 70'; López 75'

Real Estelí won 4–2 on aggregate.

=== Statistics ===
==== Top scorers ====
Rank	Player	Club	Goals
1.	(Mexico) Fernando Villalpando	Walter Ferretti	10
2.	(Spain) Pablo Gállego	Managua	8
3.	(Brazil) Christiano	Managua	6
3.	(Argentina) Leandro Figueroa	Walter Ferretti	6
3.	(Nicaragua) Dshon Forbes	Walter Ferretti	6
3.	(Nicaragua) Ulises Rayo	Real Madriz	6

==== Discipline ====
- Most yellow cards: 8
  - (Nicaragua) Daniel Rodríguez (Chinandega)
- Most red cards: 2
  - (Nicaragua) Jonathan Moncada (Deportivo Ocotal)

== Aggregate table ==
Pos	Team	Pld	W	D	L	GF	GA	GD	Pts	Qualification or relegation
1	Managua (Q)	36	20	9	7	69	40	+29	69	CONCACAF League preliminary round (Note: As Apertura and Clausura runners-up (NCA2))
2	Diriangén	36	19	10	7	47	26	+21	67	
3	Real Estelí (Q)	36	18	9	9	55	25	+30	63	CONCACAF League round of 16 (Note: As Apertura and Clausura champions (NCA1))
4	Walter Ferretti	36	18	9	9	54	32	+22	63	
5	Juventus Managua	36	11	12	13	44	41	+3	45	
6	Chinandega	36	11	7	18	35	61	−26	40	
7	Deportivo Ocotal	36	9	10	17	32	52	−20	37	
8	Real Madriz	36	8	12	16	32	52	−20	36	
9	Municipal Jalapa (O)	36	8	11	17	29	44	−15	35	Relegation play-offs
10	Deportivo Las Sabanas (R)	36	8	11	17	28	52	−24	35	Relegated to Segunda División

Source: Soccerway Soccerway
Rules for classification: 1) points; 2) goal difference; 3) number of goals scored.
(O) Play-off winners; (Q) Qualified for the phase indicated; (R) Relegated

== Relegation play-offs ==
Team 1	Agg.	Team 2	1st leg	2nd leg
Deportivo Masaya	3–4	Municipal Jalapa	2–1	1–3

30 April 2020

Deportivo Masaya	2 – 1	Municipal Jalapa
Rocha 72'; Gutiérrez 89'		Coelho 6'

4 May 2020

Municipal Jalapa	3 – 1	Deportivo Masaya
M. García 19'; Ramos 27'; Colindres 87'	Report	Guevara 60'

== List of foreign players in the league ==
This is a list of foreign players in the 2019–20 season. The following players:

1. Have played at least one game for the respective club.
2. Have not been capped for the Nicaragua national football team on any level, independently from the birthplace

A new rule was introduced this season, that clubs can have four foreign players per club and can only add a new player if there is an injury or a player/s is released and it is before the close of the season transfer window.

ART Jalapa

- (Brazil) Gabriel Coelho
- (Colombia) Ronaldo Pabon
- (Mexico) Juan Daniel González
- (Mexico) Edder Mondragón
- (Mexico) Eder García

Chinandega

- (Colombia) Brayan Cañate
- (Colombia) Marlon Barrios
- (Colombia) Esteban Lozada
- (Colombia) Duver Quinonez
- (Honduras) Cristhian Izaguirre

Diriangén

- (Argentina) Carlos Tórres
- (Argentina) Miguel Angel Pucharella
- (Costa Rica) Yeison Esquivel
- (Mexico) Bernardo Gradilla
- (Colombia) Jorge Vargas Palacio
- (Uruguay) Bernando Laureiro

Juventus Managua

- (Argentina) Lucas Reynoso
- (Brazil) Rafael de Almeida
- (Brazil) Robinson Luiz
- (Brazil) Rafael Vieira
- (Colombia) Armando Valdez
- (Paraguay) Alexander Moreno
- (Chile) Héctor "El Tanque"Vega
- (Paraguay) Fernando Insaurralde

Managua

- (Brazil) Cristiano Fernández da Lima
- (Honduras) Marel Álvarez
- (Mexico) Carlos Felix Gámez
- (Panama) Rodolfo Forbes
- (Spain) Pablo Gállego
- (Cuba) Sandro Cutino

Ocotal

- (Honduras) Allan Gutiérrez
- (Colombia) Kenverlen López
- (Colombia) Brayan Cantillo Lucumi
- (Colombia) Diego Arismendi
- (Colombia) Jerney Vente
- (Colombia) Miguel Batalla
- (Honduras) Kevin Meraz

Real Estelí

- (Argentina) Lucio Barroca
- (Brazil) Vinicius da Souza
- (Mexico) Jesús Leal
- (Mexico) Marco Granados
- (Mexico) Jaime Ayala
- (Mexico) Taufic Guarch
- (Mexico) Fabrizio Tavano

Real Madriz

- (Honduras) Daniel Suazo Guerrero
- (Honduras) Pedro Aguirre
- (Colombia) Josué Ramírez Asprilla
- (Mexico) Fernando Ramírez Pahua
- (Colombia) Andres Garzon
- (Colombia) Bryan Viveros

Deportivo Las Sabanas

- (Colombia) Carlos Mosquera
- (Mexico) Edson Contreras
- (Mexico) Luis Carbajal
- (Mexico) Rogelio Espinoza

Walter Ferretti

- (Colombia) Rodrigo Hernández
- (Brazil) Jefferson de Araujo
- (Argentina) Leandro Figueroa
- (Brazil) Pedro Dos Santos
- (Mexico) Fernando Villalpando
- (Russia) Nikita Solodchenko
- (Colombia) Juan Camilio Rodriguez

(player released during the Apertura season) (player released between the Apertura and Clausura seasons) (player released during the Clausura season)
