= 2023–24 Liga Primera =

Liga Primera
- Season: 2023–24
- Champions: Apertura: Diriangén; Clausura: Diriangén
- Relegated: Masachapa FC
- CONCACAF Central American Cup: Diriangén; Real Esteli; Managua
- Top goalscorer: Apertura: (Brazil) Lucas dos Santos (17 goals); Clausura: (Nicaragua) Luis Coronel (00 goals)
- Biggest home win: Apertura: TBD 9–0 TBD (1 December 2023); Clausura: TBD 5–1 TBD (2024)
- Biggest away win: Apertura: TBD 3-5 TBD; Clausura: TBD 0–7 TBD (2024)
- Highest scoring: Apertura: TBD 4-8 TBD; Clausura: TBD 0–7 TBD (2024)
- All statistics correct as of 24 May 2024.

The 2023–24 Liga Primera de Nicaragua football season was to be divided into two tournaments, Apertura and Clausura. The season determined the 81st and 82nd champions in the history of the Liga Primera de Nicaragua, the top division of football in Nicaragua. The Apertura tournament is to be played in the second half of 2023, while the Clausura is to be played in the first half of 2024.

== Teams ==
=== Team information ===
A total of ten teams contested the league, including nine sides from the 2022–23 Primera División, and one side from the 2022–23 Segunda División.

Juventus Managua finished last in the aggregate table and were relegated to the Segunda División. The champions from the Segunda División, FC San Francisco Masachapa, were promoted in their place.

The 9th place team in the aggregate table, UNAN Managua, faced the second-place team from the Segunda División, Chinandega FC, in a playoff for a spot in the Primera División. UNAN Managua won 14–3 over two legs, meaning UNAN Managua remained in the Primera División.

=== Promotion and relegation ===
Promoted from Segunda División as of June, 2023.

- Champions: FC San Francisco Masachapa

Relegated to Segunda División as of June, 2023.

- Last Place: Juventus Managua

=== Personnel and kits ===
Team	Chairman	Head coach	Captain	Kit manufacturer	Shirt sponsor(s)
ART Jalapa	TBD	(Nicaragua) Leonidas Rodriguez	(El Salvador) TBD	Keuka	Ferreter Noelito
Diriangén	TBD	(Argentina) José Giancone	(Nicaragua) Jason Coronel	Macron	Credifacil, Doradobet, Claro, Proplisa
CS Sebaco	TBD	(Nicaragua) Sergio Ivan Rodriguez	(Nicaragua) Luis Manuel Galeano	Keuka	Cafe OX, Siles, Transporte Tovel
Managua	TBD	(Brazil) Flavio Da Silva	(Brazil) Vinicius de Souza	Keuka	Claro, Chevron, Fetesa
Masachapa F.C.	TBD	(Nicaragua) Ricardo Arévalo	(Nicaragua) Ronald Palacios	Keuka	Havoline 2T, Electrolit, Green power
Matagalpa FC	TBD	(Costa Rica) Glen Blanco	(Panama) Rodolfo Forbes	Keuka	Standard Chontal; Central Gas; Segruidad Aguila; La Bodeguita; Distarija
Ocotal	TBD	(Nicaragua) Juan Pastrana	(Nicaragua) Leonardo Tercero	Keuka	Nil
Real Esteli	TBD	(Nicaragua) Otoniel Olivas	(Nicaragua) Josue Quijano	Keuka	Tigo, Cafe Ox
UNAN Managua	TBD	(Nicaragua) Daniel Garcia	(Nicaragua) Anderson Treminio	Joma	Universided de Managua
Walter Ferretti	TBD	(Nicaragua) Luis Diaz	(Nicaragua) Denis Espinoza	Keuka	Claro; Nica Logistics; INiser

== Managerial changes ==
=== Before the start of the season ===
Team	Outgoing manager	Manner of departure	Date of vacancy	Replaced by	Date of appointment	Position in table
Diriangén FC	(Argentina) Roberto Armando Chanampe	Mutual Consent	May 27, 2023	(Argentina) José Giancone	June 9, 2023	th (2023 Clausura)
UNAM Managua	(Nicaragua) Eduardo Urroz	Mutual Consent	June, 2023	(Nicaragua) Daniel Garcia	July, 2023	th (2023 Clausura)

=== During the Apertura season ===
Team	Outgoing manager	Manner of departure	Date of vacancy	Replaced by	Date of appointment	Position in table
Matagalpa FC	(Costa Rica) Glen Blanco	Mutual Consent	September, 2023	(Argentina) Roberto Armando Chanampe	September 28, 2023	th (2023 Apertura)

=== Between the Apertura and Clausura season ===
Team	Outgoing manager	Manner of departure	Date of vacancy	Replaced by	Date of appointment	Position in table
Walter Ferretti	(Nicaragua) Luis Diaz	Mutual consent	November 26, 2023	(Costa Rica) Glen Blanco	November 27, 2023	9th (2023 Apertura)
Masachapa FC	(Nicaragua) Ricardo Arévalo	Mutual consent	December __, 2023	(Nicaragua) Henry Urbina	December 23, 2023	7th (2023 Apertura)
ART Jalapa	(Nicaragua) Leonidas Rodriguez	Mutual consent	December __, 2023	(Nicaragua) Tyrone Acevedo	December 24, 2023	th (2023 Apertura)
Ocotal	(El Salvador) TBD	Mutual consent	TBD, 2023	(Honduras) Nelson Vasquez	TBD, 2024	th (2023 Apertura)

=== Clausura seasons ===
Team	Outgoing manager	Manner of departure	Date of vacancy	Replaced by	Date of appointment	Position in table
TBD	(Nicaragua) TBD	Sacked	TBD 4, 2024	(Nicaragua) TBD	TBD 5, 2024	th (2024 Clausura)
Masachapa FC	(Nicaragua) Henry Urbina	Sacked	April 16, 2024	(Nicaragua) Luis Lopez	April 19, 2024	th (2024 Clausura)

== Apertura 2023 ==
=== Standings ===
Pos	Team	Pld	W	D	L	GF	GA	GD	Pts	Qualification
1	Real Estelí (S, F)	18	13	3	2	37	9	+28	42	Advance to Playoffs (Semifinals)
2	Diriangén (S, F)	18	10	3	5	24	18	+6	33	Advance to Playoffs (Semifinals)
3	Club Sébaco FC (Q)	18	9	3	6	29	32	−3	30	Advance to Playoffs (Quarterfinals)
4	Managua (Q)	18	6	7	5	33	26	+7	25	Advance to Playoffs (Quarterfinals)
5	UNAN Managua (Q)	18	7	4	7	29	29	0	25	Advance to Playoffs (Quarterfinals)
6	Municipal Jalapa (Q)	18	5	7	6	22	25	−3	22	Advance to Playoffs (Quarterfinals)
7	Masachapa FC	18	6	3	9	18	32	−14	21	
8	Matagalpa	18	4	5	9	23	27	−4	17	
9	Walter Ferretti	18	3	8	7	17	24	−7	17	
10	Deportivo Ocotal	18	4	3	11	21	31	−10	15	

Updated to match(es) played on 2 May 2023. Source:
Rules for classification: 1) points; 2) goal difference; 3) number of goals scored; 4) head-to-head points; 5) head-to-head goal difference; 6) head-to-head goals scored; 7) draw.
(F) ?; (Q) Qualified for the phase indicated; (S) ?

==== Semi-finals ====
Team 1	Agg.	Team 2	1st leg	2nd leg
Diriangén	5-1	Sport Sebaco	2–1	3-0
Real Estelí	1-0	Managua	1-0	0–0

December 4, 2023
18:00

Sport Sebaco	1-2	Diriangén
Brayan Zuniga 71'		Renzo Carballo 38' 42'

Estadio Carlos Fonseca Amador, Matagalpa
Referee: Miller Lopez

December 10, 2023
17:00

Diriangén	3-0	Sport Sebaco
Renzo Carballo 26'; Matias Galvaliz 45'; Luis Copete 50'		Nil

Estadio Cacique, Diriamba

Diriangén won 5–1 on aggregate.

December 11, 2023
16:00

Managua	0-1	Real Estelí
Nil		Arley Bonilla 56'

Estadio Cacique, Diriamba

December 15, 2022
19:00

Real Estelí	0-0	Managua
Nil		Nil

Estadio Independencia, Esteli

Real Estelí won 1–0 on aggregate.

==== Final ====
===== First leg =====
18 December 2023
11:00 (UTC-6)

Diriangen	1-0	Real Estelí
Luis Carlos Torres 49'		Nil

Estadio Cacique Diriangén, Diriamba
Referee: Nitzar Sandoval

===== Second leg =====
23 December 2023
12:00 (UTC-6)

Real Estelí	1-1	Diriangen
Byron Bonilla 45'		Luis Coronal 95'

Estadio Independencia, Esteli
Referee: Ricardo Hernandez

Diriangen FC won 2–1 on Aggregate.

Apertura 2023 champions

31st title

==== Top Goalscorer (Apertura 2023) ====
No.	Player	Club	Goals
1	(Brazil) Lucas Dos Santos	Managua	17
2	(Nicaragua) Anderson Treminio	UNAN Managua	13
3	(Nicaragua) Dshon Forbes	Diriangen	8
4	(Nicaragua) Luis Galeano	Sport Sebaco	8
5	(El Salvador) Abner Acuña	UNAN Managua	6
6	(Argentina) Matias Veron	Matagalpa	6
7	(Nicaragua) Byron Bonilla	Real Esteli	5
8	(Colombia) Erick Alcazar	Jalapa	4
9	(Colombia) Arley Bonilla	Real Esteli	4
10	(Argentina) Leonel Buter	Diriangen	4

=== Attendances ===
#	Football club	Average attendance
1	Real Estelí	1,337
2	Diriangén FC	1,318
3	Walter Ferretti	812
4	Club Sébaco FC	743
5	Managua FC	742
6	UNAN Managua	658
7	Municipal Jalapa	562
8	Masachapa FC	540
9	Matagalpa FC	482
10	Deportivo Ocotal	431

== Clausura 2024 ==
=== Standings ===
Pos	Team	Pld	W	D	L	GF	GA	GD	Pts	Qualification
1	Diriangén (S, F)	18	14	2	2	43	12	+31	44	Advance to Playoffs (Semifinals)
2	Real Estelí (S, F)	18	10	5	3	33	13	+20	35	Advance to Playoffs (Semifinals)
3	Managua (Q)	18	8	6	4	32	20	+12	30	Advance to Playoffs (Quarterfinals)
4	Deportivo Ocotal (Q)	18	8	3	7	23	29	−6	27	Advance to Playoffs (Quarterfinals)
5	Walter Ferretti (Q)	18	7	4	7	20	14	+6	25	Advance to Playoffs (Quarterfinals)
6	Municipal Jalapa (Q)	18	7	4	7	20	25	−5	25	Advance to Playoffs (Quarterfinals)
7	Matagalpa	18	6	3	9	27	32	−5	21	
8	UNAN Managua	18	6	3	9	25	32	−7	21	
9	Club Sébaco FC	18	4	6	8	25	40	−15	18	
10	Masachapa FC	18	1	2	15	19	50	−31	5	

Updated to match(es) played on 2 May 2023. Source:
Rules for classification: 1) points; 2) goal difference; 3) number of goals scored; 4) head-to-head points; 5) head-to-head goal difference; 6) head-to-head goals scored; 7) draw.
(F) ?; (Q) Qualified for the phase indicated; (S) ?

==== Quarterfinals ====
May 2, 2024

Managua	2-3	ART Jalapa
Lucas dos Santos 58' 67'		L Borge; Erick Alcazar 93'; M Reyes 96'

Estadio

ART Jalapa progressed.

December 5, 2022

Deportivo Walter Ferretti	5-1	Juventus Managua
Francisco Ramos 9' 56'; Luciano Sanhueza 68' 80'; Alexis Somarriba 90'		Lucas Dos Santos 75'

Estadio Cacique Diriangén, Diriamba

Walter Ferretti progressed.

==== Semi-finals ====
Team 1	Agg.	Team 2	1st leg	2nd leg
Diriangén	3-0	ART Jalapa	2–0	1-0
Real Estelí	7-1	Ocotal	2-0	5-1

May 5, 2024
15:00

ART Jalapa	0-2	Diriangén
Nil		Luis Copete; Renzo Carballo

Estadio Alejandro Ramos

May 9, 2024
17:00

Diriangén	1-0	ART Jalapa
Renzo Carballo 20'		Nil

Estadio Cacique, Diriamba

Diriangén won 5–1 on aggregate.

May 4, 2024
16:00

Ocotal	0-2	Real Estelí
Nil		Marvin Fletes 12'; Harold Medina 59'

Estadio Roy Fernando Bermudez

May 9, 2022
19:00

Real Estelí	5-1	Ocotal
Bancy Hernández 32' 69'; Harold Medina 48'; Bryan Ordonez 64'; Byron Bonilla 71'		Oscar Rosales 62'

Estadio Independencia, Esteli

Real Estelí won 7–1 on aggregate.

==== Final ====
===== First leg =====
12 May 2024
19:00 (UTC-6)

Real Estelí	2-1	Diriangen
Bryan Ordonez 40'; Josue Quijano 95'		Luis Carlos Torres (pen.), 57'

Estadio Independencia, Esteli
Referee: Tatiana Guzmán

===== Second leg =====
18 May 2024
19:00 (UTC-6)

Diriangen	2-0	Real Estelí
Salanda , 24' (o.g.); Luis Coronel 75'		Nil

Estadio Cacique Diriangén, Diriamba
Referee: Ricardo Mendoza

Diriangen won 3–2 on Aggregate.

Clausura 2024 champions

32nd title

=== Top Goalscorer (Clausura 2024) ===
No.	Player	Club	Goals
1	(Nicaragua) Luis Coronel	Diriangén	11
2	(Honduras) Brayan Zúniga	Club Sébaco FC	10
3	(Brazil) Lucas Dos Santos	Managua	9
4	(Honduras) Edwin Castro	Ocotal	7
5	(Argentina) Leandro Figueroa	Walter Ferretti	7
6	(Colombia) (Nicaragua) Erick Alcázar	ART Jalapa	5
7	(Nicaragua) Junior Arteaga	Diriangén	5
8	(Nicaragua) Edry Centeno	Ocotal	5
9	(Panama) Sergio Cunningham	Real Esteli	5
10	(Honduras) Christian Durón	Masachapa FC	5

== List of foreign players in the league ==
This is a list of foreign players in the 2023–24 season. The following players:

1. Have played at least one game for the respective club.
2. Have not been capped for the Nicaragua national football team on any level, independently from the birthplace

A new rule was introduced this season, that clubs can have four foreign players per club and can only add a new player if there is an injury or a player/s is released, and it is before the closing of the season transfer window.

ART Jalapa

- (Colombia) Neider SanJuan
- (Cuba) Rolando Abreu
- (Cuba) Felix Alejandro Rodriguez
- (Cuba) Maykel Reyes
- (Uruguay) José Bernardo Laureiro

Diriangén

- (Argentina) Carlos Tórres
- (Argentina) Leonel Buter
- (Argentina) Matias Galvaliz
- (Argentina) Tomas Alvarez
- (Costa Rica) Alfonso Quesada
- (Paraguay) Renzo Carballo

CS Sebaco

- (Argentina) Miguel Pucharella
- (Cuba) Jose Armelo
- (Honduras) Brayan Zúñiga
- (Colombia) David Castrillon
- (Colombia) Ronald Granja

Managua

- (Brazil) Gabriel Junior
- (Brazil) Gabriel Vidal
- (Brazil) Gyan Araujo
- (Brazil) Lucas Dos Santos
- (Paraguay) Luis Ibarra

Masachapa FC

- (Colombia) Marlon Ibarguen
- (Colombia) Nester Carabali
- (Colombia) Paul Barbosa

Matagalpa FC

- (Argentina) Matias Vernon
- (Colombia) Juan Murillo
- (Honduras) Kevin castro
- (Panama) Rodolfo Forbes
- (Colombia) Luis Vanegas

Ocotal

- (Brazil) Cristano Fernandez
- (Colombia) Yubeiquer Arenas
- (Colombia) Jhesuad Salamanca
- (Colombia) Juan Carvajal
- (Cuba) Erick Rizo
- (Colombia) John Rivas

Real Estelí

- (Argentina) Abel Mendez
- (Argentina) Fabián Monserrat
- (Brazil) Ewerton da Silva
- (Colombia) Arley Bonilla
- (Colombia) Leyvin Balanta

UNAM Managua

- (Brazil) Pedro Dos Santos
- (Colombia) Hans Mina
- (Colombia) John Mena
- (Cuba) Dario Ramos
- (Cuba) Eugenio Palmero

Walter Ferretti

- (Brazil) Leandro Soares
- (Colombia) Ariel Torregrosa
- (Colombia) Francisco Ramos
- (Colombia) Yeison Mosquera
- (Colombia) Cesar Vente Contención

(player released during the Apertura season) (player released between the Apertura and Clausura seasons) (player released during the Clausura season)
