= José Giacone =

Argentinean footballer

Jose Giacone
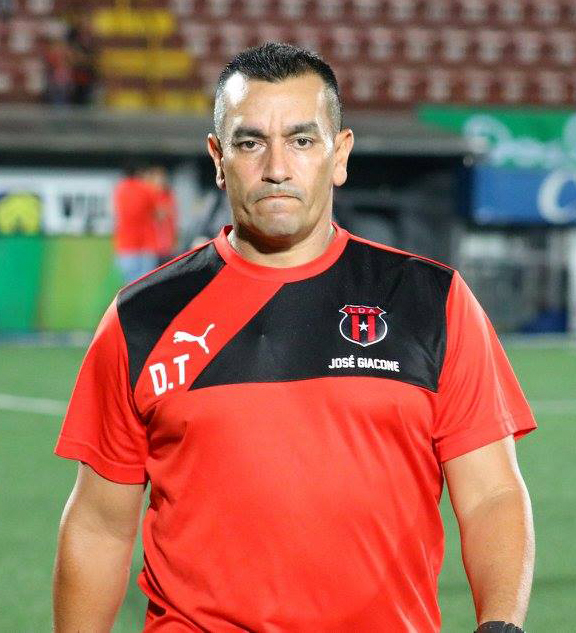

Personal information
- Full name: Jose Antonio Giacone
- Date of birth: 5 January 1971 (age 55)
- Place of birth: Argentina
- Position: Defender

Senior career*
Years	Team	Apps	(Gls)
- Defensores de Belgrano
1997-1998	CSyD Tristán Suárez	14	(1)
1998-1999	Sportivo Italiano	24	(0)
2000-2001	CSD Flandria	14	(0)

Managerial career
- 2011-2012: Saprissa B
- 2012-2015: UCR
- 2015: Saprissa (Assistant)
- 2015-2016: Belen
- 2016: Alajuelense
- 2016-2019: Pérez Zeledón
- 2019-2020: Herediano
- 2020: Jicaral
- 2021-2023: Sporting F.C.
- 2023-2024: Diriangén
- 2024-2025: Saprissa
- 2025: Diriangén
- 2025-2026: Herediano
- 2026: Pérez Zeledón
- 2026-: Inter Santa Tecla
- * Club domestic league appearances and goals

José Giacone (born 5 January 1971 in Argentina) is an Argentinean retired footballer. He is the manager of Salvadoran club Inter Santa Tecla

== Honours ==
=== Manager ===
Pérez Zeledón

- Liga FPD :2017 Apertura

Herediano

- Liga FPD :2019 Apertura

Diriangén

- Liga Primera de Nicaragua: Apertura 2023, Clausura 2024, 2025 Apertura
- Copa de Nicaragua: Copa Primera 2024, Copa Primera 2025
