= Domestic football champions =

List of championship football clubs

In men's association football, national associations organise annual championships for their member clubs. The winners of those are declared champions of the country. Normally, as per tradition, the club is presented a title and the players and staff receive winners' medals.

Domestic champions usually gain access to continental leagues for the next season.

== Current champions ==
Below are lists of the current or last known champions of the nations that are members, full or associate, of one of FIFA's six continental confederations: AFC (Asia), CAF (Africa), CONCACAF (North and Central America and the Caribbean), CONMEBOL (South America), OFC (Oceania), and UEFA (Europe). The great majority of those nations are also members of FIFA itself; where this is not the case, this is noted.

Former and defunct championships are not included, and neither are those where there has been no evidence for activity for at least a couple of years.

=== AFC ===
Northern Mariana Islands currently uses the split-season format: "Spring" and "Fall", and thus championship is awarded twice within a calendar year.

Northern Mariana Islands also does not have FIFA membership.

There is no indication of current activity of the championships of Pakistan (since c. 2021) (Note: Pakistan - List of Champions. RSSSF.) and Sri Lanka (since c. 2022). (Note: Sri Lanka - List of Champions. RSSSF.) Both leagues of Palestine (the West Bank Premier League and the Gaza Strip Premier League) have been suspended since 2023 due to the Gaza war. (Note: Palestine - List of Champions and Cup Winners. RSSSF.)

- Abu Muslim (Afghanistan '25–'26) (Note: Afghanistan - List of Champions. RSSSF.)
- Auckland (Australia '25–'26) (Note: Australia - List of Champions. RSSSF.)
- Al Muharraq Club (Bahrain '25–'26) (Note: Bahrain - List of Champions. RSSSF.)
- Bashundhara Kings (Bangladesh '25–'26) (Note: Bangladesh - List of Champions. RSSSF.)
- Paro (Bhutan '25) (Note: Bhutan - List of Champions. RSSSF.)
- Indera (Brunei '25–'26) (Note: Brunei - List of Champions. RSSSF.)
- Preah Khan Reach Svay Rieng (Cambodia '25–'26) (Note: Cambodia - List of Champions. RSSSF.)
- Shanghai Port (China '25) (Note: China - List of Champions. RSSSF.)
- Tainan City (Chinese Taipei '25–'26) (Note: Taiwan - List of Champions. RSSSF.)
- Karketu Dili (East Timor '25) (Note: East Timor - List of Champions. RSSSF.) (Note: No information on later championships is available.)
- Rovers (Guam '25) (Note: Guam - List of Champions. RSSSF.)
- Kitchee (Hong Kong '25–'26) (Note: Hongkong - List of Champions and Runners-Up. RSSSF.)
- East Bengal (India '25–'26) (Note: India - List of National Champions. RSSSF.)
- Persib (Indonesia '25–'26) (Note: Indonesia - List of (Semi-)Professional Champions. RSSSF.)
- Tractor (Iran '24–'25) (Note: Iran - List of Champions. RSSSF.)

- Al-Quwa Al-Jawiya (Iraq '25–'26) (Note: Iraq - List of Champions. RSSSF.)
- Kashima Antlers (Japan '25) (Note: Japan - List of Champions. RSSSF.)
- Al-Hussein Irbid (Jordan '25–'26) (Note: Jordan - List of Champions. RSSSF.)
- Al-Kuwait (Kuwait '23–'24) (Note: Kuwait - List of Champions. RSSSF.)
- Bars Issyk-Kul (Kyrgyzstan '25) (Note: Kyrgyzstan - List of Champions. RSSSF.)
- Ezra (Laos '25–'26) (Note: Laos - List of Champions. RSSSF.)
- Al Ansar (Lebanon '24–'25) (Note: Lebanon - List of Champions. RSSSF.)
- MUST IPO (Macau '25) (Note: Macao - List of Champions. RSSSF.)
- Johor Darul Ta'zim (Malaysia '25–'26) (Note: Malaysia - List of Champions. RSSSF.)
- Maziya (Maldives '25–'26) (Note: Maldives - List of Champions. RSSSF.)
- SP Falcons (Mongolia '24–'25) (Note: Mongolia - List of Champions. RSSSF.)
- Shan United (Myanmar '25–'26) (Note: Myanmar (Burma) - List of Champions. RSSSF.)
- Church Boys United (Nepal '23) (Note: Nepal - List of Champions and Cup Winners. RSSSF.)
- April 25 (North Korea '24–'25) (Note: North Korea - List of Champions. RSSSF.)
- Kanoa (Northern Mariana Islands '25 Fall) (Note: Northern Marianas - List of Champions. RSSSF.)

- Al-Seeb (Oman '25–'26) (Note: Oman - List of Champions. RSSSF.)
- Manila Digger (Philippines '25–'26) (Note: Philippines - List of Champions. RSSSF.)
- Al-Sadd (Qatar '25–'26) (Note: Qatar - List of Champions. RSSSF.)
- Al-Nassr (Saudi Arabia '25–'26) (Note: Saudi Arabia - List of Champions. RSSSF.)
- Lion City Sailors (Singapore '25–'26) (Note: Singapore - List of Champions. RSSSF.)
- Jeonbuk Hyundai Motors (South Korea '25) (Note: South Korea - List of Champions. RSSSF.)
- Al Ittihad Ahli (Syria '24–'25) (Note: Syria - List of Champions. RSSSF.)
- Istiklol (Tajikistan '25) (Note: Tajikistan - List of Champions. RSSSF.)
- Buriram United (Thailand '25–'26) (Note: Thailand - List of Champions. RSSSF.)
- Arkadag (Turkmenistan '25) (Note: Turkmenistan - List of Champions. RSSSF.)
- Al Ain (United Arab Emirates '25–'26) (Note: United Arab Emirates - List of Champions. RSSSF.)
- Neftchi (Uzbekistan '25) (Note: Uzbekistan - List of Champions. RSSSF.)
- Cong An Hanoi (Vietnam '25–'26) (Note: Vietnam - List of Champions. RSSSF.)
- Al-Ahli Sanaa (Yemen '23–'24) (Note: Yemen - List of Champions. RSSSF.)

=== CAF ===
Réunion and Zanzibar are associate members of CAF and do not have FIFA membership.

The championship of Sudan has been suspended since 2023 due to the civil war in the country. (Note: Sudan - List of Champions. RSSSF.)

- MC Alger (Algeria '25–'26) (Note: Algeria - List of Champions. RSSSF.)
- Petro Atlético (Angola '25–'26) (Note: Angola - List of Champions. RSSSF.)
- Dadjè (Benin '24–'25) (Note: Benin - List of Champions. RSSSF.)
- Gaborone United (Botswana '25–'26) (Note: Botswana - List of Champions. RSSSF.)
- Rahimo (Burkina Faso '24–'25) (Note: Burkina Faso - List of Champions. RSSSF.)
- Aigle Noir Makamba (Burundi '25–'26) (Note: Burundi - List of Champions. RSSSF.)
- Colombe Sportive (Cameroon '24–'25) (Note: Cameroon - List of Champions. RSSSF.)
- Palmeira (Cape Verde '24–'25) (Note: Cape Verde Islands - List of Champions. RSSSF.)
- AS Tempête Mocaf (Central African Republic '23–'24) (Note: Central African Republic - List of Champions. RSSSF.)
- AS PSI (Chad '23) (Note: Chad - List of Champions. RSSSF.) (Note: The 2024 season was cancelled due to internal issues in the national association.)
- US Zilimadjou (Comoros '25) (Note: Comoros - List of Champions. RSSSF.)
- AC Léopards (Congo '23–'24) (Note: Congo (Brazzaville) - List of Champions. RSSSF.)
- Aigles du Congo (DR Congo '24–'25) (Note: Congo-Kinshasa (DR Congo; formerly Zaire) Champions. RSSSF.)
- ASAS Djibouti Télécom (Djibouti '24–'25) (Note: Djibouti Champions. RSSSF.)
- Zamalek (Egypt '25–'26) (Note: Egypt - List of Champions. RSSSF.)
- Fundación Bata (Equatorial Guinea '24–'25) (Note: Equatorial Guinea - List of Champions. RSSSF.)
- Denden (Eritrea '25) (Note: Eritrea - List of Champions. RSSSF.)
- Nsingizini Hotspurs (Eswatini '25–'26) (Note: Swaziland (eSwatini) - List of Champions. RSSSF.)
- Ethiopian Insurance (Ethiopia '24–'25) (Note: Ethiopia - List of Champions. RSSSF.)

- Mangasport (Gabon '25) (Note: Gabon - List of Champions. RSSSF.)
- Real de Banjul (Gambia '24–'25) (Note: Gambia Champions. RSSSF.)
- Medeama (Ghana '25–'26) (Note: Ghana - List of Champions. RSSSF.)
- Horoya (Guinea '24–'25) (Note: Guinea - List of Champions. RSSSF.)
- Sport Bissau e Benfica (Guinea-Bissau '24–'25) (Note: Guinea Bissau - List of Champions. RSSSF.)
- ASEC Mimosas (Ivory Coast '25–'26) (Note: Ivory Coast - List of Champions. RSSSF.)
- Gor Mahia (Kenya '25–'26) (Note: Kenya - List of Champions. RSSSF.)
- Lijabatho (Lesotho '25–'26) (Note: Lesotho - List of Champions. RSSSF.)
- Fassell (Liberia '24–'25) (Note: Liberia - List of Champions. RSSSF.)
- Al Ahli (Libya '24–'25) (Note: Libya - List of Champions. RSSSF.)
- ASSM Elgeco Plus (Madagascar '25) (Note: Madagascar - List of Champions. RSSSF.)
- Mighty Wanderers (Malawi '25) (Note: Malawi - List of Champions. RSSSF.)
- Stade Malien (Mali '24–'25) (Note: Mali - List of Champions. RSSSF.)
- Nouadhibou (Mauritania '24–'25) (Note: Mauritania - List of Champions. RSSSF.)
- La Cure Waves (Mauritius '25–'26) (Note: Mauritius - List of Champions. RSSSF.)
- RS Berkane (Morocco '24–'25) (Note: Morocco - List of Champions. RSSSF.)
- Songo (Mozambique '25) (Note: Mozambique - List of Champions. RSSSF.)
- African Stars (Namibia '25–'26) (Note: Namibia - List of Champions. RSSSF.)
- AS FAN (Niger '24–'25) (Note: Niger - List of Champions. RSSSF.)

- Rangers International (Nigeria '25–'26) (Note: Nigeria Champions. RSSSF.)
- Excelsior (Réunion '24) (Note: Réunion - List of Champions. RSSSF.)
- APR (Rwanda '25–'26) (Note: Rwanda - List of Champions. RSSSF.)
- GD Os Operários (São Tomé and Príncipe '25) (Note: São Tomé e Príncipe - List of Champions. RSSSF.)
- ASC Jaraaf (Senegal '24–'25) (Note: Senegal - List of Champions. RSSSF.)
- Côte d'Or (Seychelles '24–'25) (Note: Seychelles - List of Champions. RSSSF.)
- East End Lions (Sierra Leone '24–'25) (Note: Sierra Leone - List of Champions. RSSSF.)
- Mogadishu City Club (Somalia '24–'25) (Note: Somalia Champions. RSSSF.)
- Orlando Pirates (South Africa '25–'26) (Note: South Africa Champions. RSSSF.)
- Jamus (South Sudan '25) (Note: South Sudan - List of Champions and Cup Winners. RSSSF.)
- Young Africans (Tanzania '24–'25) (Note: Tanzania - List of Champions. RSSSF.)
- ASC Kara (Togo '24–'25) (Note: Togo - List of Champions. RSSSF.)
- Club Africain (Tunisia '25–'26) (Note: Tunisia - List of Champions. RSSSF.)
- Vipers (Uganda '25–'26) (Note: Uganda - List of Champions. RSSSF.)
- Power Dynamos (Zambia '24–'25) (Note: Zambia Champions. RSSSF.)
- Mlandege (Zanzibar '24–'25) (Note: Zanzibar Champions. RSSSF.)
- Scottland (Zimbabwe '25) (Note: Zimbabwe (and Rhodesia) Champions. RSSSF.)

=== CONCACAF ===
In Saint Kitts and Nevis two top-level leagues coexist (the SKNFA Premier League and the N1 League), and thus the country has two champions.

Belize, Costa Rica, El Salvador, Guatemala, Honduras, Mexico, Nicaragua, Panama, and Puerto Rico currently use the split-season format: "Apertura" and "Clausura" ("Opening" and "Closing" in Belize), and thus championship is awarded twice within a calendar year.

Bonaire, French Guiana, Guadeloupe, Martinique, Saint Martin and Sint Maarten do not have FIFA membership.

There is no indication of current activity of the championship of Montserrat since c. 2017, (Note: Montserrat - List of Champions. RSSSF.) and of the N1 League of Saint Kitts and Nevis since c. 2021. (Note: Saint Kitts and Nevis - List of Champions. RSSSF.)

- Roaring Lions (Anguilla '25) (Note: Anguilla - List of Champions. RSSSF.)
- All Saints United (Antigua and Barbuda '24–'25) (Note: Antigua and Barbuda - List of Champions. RSSSF.)
- Britannia (Aruba '24–'25) (Note: Aruba - List of Champions. RSSSF.)
- Western Warriors (Bahamas '24–'25) (Note: Bahamas - List of Champions. RSSSF.)
- Weymouth Wales (Barbados '25) (Note: Barbados - List of Champions. RSSSF.)
- Verdes (Belize '24–'25 Closing) (Note: Belize - List of Champions. RSSSF.)
- North Village Rams (Bermuda '24–'25) (Note: Bermuda - List of Champions. RSSSF.)
- Real Rincon (Bonaire '23–'24) (Note: Bonaire - List of Champions. RSSSF.)
- Virgin Gorda United (British Virgin Islands '24–'25) (Note: British Virgin Islands - List of Champions. RSSSF.)
- Atlético Ottawa (Canada '25) (Note: Canada - List of Champions. RSSSF.)
- Elite (Cayman Islands '24–'25) (Note: Cayman Islands - List of Champions. RSSSF.)
- Alajuelense (Costa Rica '25–'26 Apertura) (Note: Costa Rica - List of Champions and Runners-Up. RSSSF.)
- La Habana (Cuba '25) (Note: Cuba - List of Champions. RSSSF.)
- Jong Holland (Curaçao '22) (Note: Curaçao - List of Champions. RSSSF.) (Note: The 2023–24 season was suspended due to conflicts between the federation and several clubs.)

- Dublanc (Dominica '25) (Note: Dominica - List of Champions. RSSSF.)
- Salcedo (Dominican Republic '25–'26) (Note: Dominican Republic - List of Champions. RSSSF.)
- Once Deportivo (El Salvador '24–'25 Apertura) (Note: El Salvador - List of Champions. RSSSF.)
- Étoile Matoury (French Guiana '23–'24) (Note: France - D.O.M. - French Guyana - List of Champions. RSSSF.)
- Paradise (Grenada '24–'25) (Note: Grenada - List of Champions. RSSSF.)
- CS Moulien (Guadeloupe '23–'24) (Note: France - D.O.M. - Guadeloupe - List of Champions. RSSSF.)
- Antigua (Guatemala '25–'26 Apertura) (Note: Guatemala - List of Champions. RSSSF.)
- Guyana Defence Force (Guyana '24) (Note: Guyana - List of Champions. RSSSF.)
- Violette (Haiti '25–'26 Clausura) (Note: Haiti - List of Champions. RSSSF.)
- Motagua (Honduras '25–'26 Clausura) (Note: Honduras - List of Champions. RSSSF.)
- Cavalier (Jamaica '24–'25) (Note: Jamaica - List of Champions. RSSSF.)
- Saint-Joseph (Martinique '24–'25) (Note: France - D.O.M. - Martinique - List of Champions. RSSSF.)
- Cruz Azul (Mexico '25–'26 Clausura) (Note: Mexico - List of Champions. RSSSF.)
- Real Estelí (Nicaragua '25–'26 Clausura) (Note: Nicaragua - List of Champions. RSSSF.)

- Plaza Amador (Panama '25 Apertura) (Note: Panama - List of Champions. RSSSF.)
- Academia Quintana (Puerto Rico '25–'26 Apertura) (Note: Puerto Rico - List of Champions. RSSSF.)
- St. Paul's United (St Kitts and Nevis, SKNFA PL '25)
- BAYS (St Lucia '23) (Note: Saint Lucia - List of Champions. RSSSF.)
- Junior Stars (St Martin '24–'25) (Note: Saint-Martin - List of Champions. RSSSF.)
- North Leeward Predators (St Vincent and the Grenadines '24–'25) (Note: Saint Vincent and the Grenadines - Championships Overview. RSSSF.)
- Eagles (Sint Maarten '24–'25) (Note: Sint Maarten - List of Champions. RSSSF.)
- Robinhood (Suriname '24) (Note: Surinam - List of Champions. RSSSF.)
- Defence Force (Trinidad and Tobago '24–'25) (Note: Trinidad and Tobago - List of Champions. RSSSF.)
- SWA Sharks (Turks and Caicos Islands '24–'25) (Note: Turks and Caicos Islands - List of Champions. RSSSF.)
- Inter Miami (United States '25) (Note: USA - List of Champions of US Pro Soccer League, Division I. RSSSF.)
- Helenites (U.S. Virgin Islands '25) (Note: US Virgin Islands - List of Champions. RSSSF.)

=== CONMEBOL ===
Colombia ("Apertura" and "Finalización") and Paraguay ("Apertura" and "Clausura") currently use the split-season format, and thus championship is awarded twice within a calendar year.

- Belgrano (Argentina '26 Apertura) (Note: Argentina - List of Champions and Runners-Up. RSSSF.)
- Always Ready (Bolivia '25) (Note: Bolivia - List of Champions. RSSSF.)
- Flamengo (Brazil '25) (Note: Brazil - List of Champions. RSSSF.)
- Coquimbo Unido (Chile '25) (Note: Chile - List of Champions and Runners Up. RSSSF.)
- Atlético Junior (Colombia '25 Finalización) (Note: Colombia - List of Champions and Runners-Up. RSSSF.)

- Independiente del Valle (Ecuador '25) (Note: Ecuador - List of Champions. RSSSF.)
- Club Olimpia (Paraguay '26 Apertura) (Note: Paraguay - List of Champions and Runners Up. RSSSF.)
- Universitario (Peru '25) (Note: Peru - List of Champions. RSSSF.)
- Nacional (Uruguay '25) (Note: Uruguay - List of Champions. RSSSF.)
- Universidad Central de Venezuela (Venezuela '25) (Note: Venezuela - List of Champions and Runners Up. RSSSF.)

=== OFC ===
Kiribati and Tuvalu are associate members of OFC and do not have FIFA membership.

- Royal Puma (American Samoa '25) (Note: American Samoa - List of Champions. RSSSF.)
- Tupapa Maraerenga (Cook Islands '25) (Note: Cook Islands - List of Champions. RSSSF.)
- Rewa (Fiji '25) (Note: Fiji - List of Champions. RSSSF.)
- Betio Town Council (Kiribati '23) (Note: Kiribati - List of Champions. RSSSF.)
- Tiga Sport (New Caledonia '25) (Note: New Caledonia - List of Champions. RSSSF.)
- Auckland City (New Zealand '25) (Note: New Zealand - List of Champions. RSSSF.)
- Hekari United (Papua New Guinea '24) (Note: Papua New Guinea - List of Champions. RSSSF.)

- Vaipuna (Samoa '25) (Note: Samoa - List of Champions. RSSSF.)
- Central Coast (Solomon Islands '25) (Note: Solomon Islands - List of Champions. RSSSF.)
- Vénus (Tahiti '24–'25) (Note: Tahiti - List of Champions. RSSSF.)
- Nukuhetulu (Tonga '25) (Note: Tonga - List of Champions. RSSSF.)
- Nauti (Tuvalu '23) (Note: Tuvalu - List of Champions. RSSSF.)
- ABM Galaxy (Vanuatu '25) (Note: Vanuatu - List of Champions. RSSSF.)

=== UEFA ===
One UEFA member, Liechtenstein, does not currently organise a domestic championship. (Note: Liechtenstein - List of Champions. RSSSF.)

- Egnatia (Albania '25–'26) (Note: Albania - List of Champions. RSSSF.)
- Inter Club d'Escaldes (Andorra '25–'26) (Note: Andorra - List of Champions. RSSSF.)
- Ararat-Armenia (Armenia '25–'26) (Note: Armenia - List of Champions. RSSSF.)
- LASK (Austria '25–'26) (Note: Austria - List of Champions. RSSSF.)
- Sabah (Azerbaijan '25–'26) (Note: Azerbaijan - List of Champions. RSSSF.)
- Maxline Vitebsk (Belarus '25) (Note: Belarus - List of Champions. RSSSF.)
- Club Brugge (Belgium '25–'26) (Note: Belgium - List of Champions. RSSSF.)
- Borac Banja Luka (Bosnia and Herzegovina '25–'26) (Note: Bosnia-Herzegovina - List of Champions. RSSSF.)
- Levski Sofia (Bulgaria '25–'26) (Note: Bulgaria - List of Champions. RSSSF.)
- Dinamo Zagreb (Croatia '25–'26) (Note: Croatia - List of Champions. RSSSF.)
- Omonia (Cyprus '25–'26) (Note: Cyprus - List of Champions. RSSSF.)
- Slavia Prague (Czech Republic '25–'26) (Note: Czech Republic - List of Champions. RSSSF.)
- Aarhus GF (Denmark '25–'26) (Note: Denmark - List of Champions. RSSSF.)
- Arsenal (England '25–'26) (Note: England - List of Champions. RSSSF.)
- Flora (Estonia '25) (Note: Estonia - List of Champions. RSSSF.)
- KÍ (Faroe Islands '25) (Note: Faroe Islands - List of Champions. RSSSF.)
- KuPS (Finland '25) (Note: Finland - List of Champions. RSSSF.)
- Paris Saint-Germain (France '25–'26) (Note: France - List of Champions. RSSSF.)

- Iberia 1999 (Georgia '25) (Note: Georgia - List of Champions. RSSSF.)
- Bayern Munich (Germany '25–'26) (Note: (West) Germany - List of Champions. RSSSF.)
- Lincoln Red Imps (Gibraltar '25–'26) (Note: Gibraltar - List of Champions. RSSSF.)
- AEK Athens (Greece '25–'26) (Note: Greece - List of Champions. RSSSF.)
- Győri ETO (Hungary '25–'26) (Note: Hungary - List of Champions. RSSSF.)
- Víkingur Reykjavík (Iceland '26) (Note: Iceland - List of Champions. RSSSF.)
- Hapoel Be'er Sheva (Israel '25–'26) (Note: Israel - List of Champions. RSSSF.)
- Inter Milan (Italy '25–'26) (Note: Italy - List of Champions. RSSSF.)
- Kairat (Kazakhstan '25) (Note: Kazakhstan - List of Champions. RSSSF.)
- Drita (Kosovo '25–'26) (Note: Kosovo - List of Champions. RSSSF.)
- Riga (Latvia '25) (Note: Latvia - List of Champions. RSSSF.)
- Kauno Žalgiris (Lithuania '25) (Note: Lithuania - List of Champions. RSSSF.)
- Atert Bissen (Luxembourg '25–'26) (Note: Luxembourg - List of Champions. RSSSF.)
- Floriana (Malta '25–'26) (Note: Malta - List of Champions and Runners-Up. RSSSF.)
- Petrocub Hîncești (Moldova '25–'26) (Note: Moldova - List of Champions. RSSSF.)
- Sutjeska Nikšić (Montenegro '25–'26) (Note: Montenegro - List of Champions. RSSSF.)
- PSV Eindhoven (Netherlands '25–'26) (Note: Netherlands - Champions. RSSSF.)
- Vardar (North Macedonia '25–'26) (Note: (North) Macedonia - List of Champions. RSSSF.)

- Larne (Northern Ireland '25–'26) (Note: Northern Ireland - Champions. RSSSF.)
- Viking (Norway '25) (Note: Norway - List of Champions. RSSSF.)
- Lech Poznań (Poland '25–'26) (Note: Poland - List of Champions. RSSSF.)
- Porto (Portugal '25–'26) (Note: Portugal - List of Champions. RSSSF.)
- Shamrock Rovers (Republic of Ireland '25) (Note: Republic of Ireland - Champions. RSSSF.)
- Universitatea Craiova (Romania '25–'26) (Note: Romania - List of Champions. RSSSF.)
- Zenit Saint Petersburg (Russia '25–'26) (Note: Russia - List of Champions. RSSSF.)
- Tre Fiori (San Marino '25–'26) (Note: San Marino - List of Champions. RSSSF.)
- Celtic (Scotland '25–'26) (Note: Scotland - List of Champions. RSSSF.)
- Red Star Belgrade (Serbia '25–'26) (Note: Yugoslavia/Serbia (and Montenegro) - List of Champions. RSSSF.)
- Slovan Bratislava (Slovakia '25–'26) (Note: Slovakia - List of Champions. RSSSF.)
- Celje (Slovenia '25–'26) (Note: Slovenia - List of Champions. RSSSF.)
- Barcelona (Spain '25–'26) (Note: Spain - List of Champions. RSSSF.)
- Mjällby AIF (Sweden '25) (Note: Sweden - List of Champions. RSSSF.)
- Thun (Switzerland '25–'26) (Note: Switzerland - List of Champions. RSSSF.)
- Galatasaray (Turkey '25–'26) (Note: Turkey - List of Champions. RSSSF.)
- Shakhtar Donetsk (Ukraine '25–'26) (Note: Ukraine - List of Champions. RSSSF.)
- The New Saints (Wales '25–'26) (Note: Wales - List of Champions. RSSSF.)

== Historical records ==
=== Longest streaks ===
The below tables list the teams with the longest streaks of consecutive titles, current or historical.

Active

Titles	Team	Country	Streak	Notes
12	Istiklol	Tajikistan	2014 to 2025	
12	Johor Darul Ta'zim	Malaysia	2014 to 2025–26	
9	Red Star Belgrade	Serbia	2017–18 to 2025–26	
8	Mamelodi Sundowns	South Africa	2017–18 to 2024–25	
8	Nouadhibou	Mauritania	2017–18 to 2024–25	
8	Lincoln Red Imps	Gibraltar	2017–18 to 2025–26	
8	Slovan Bratislava	Slovakia	2018–19 to 2025–26	
6	Real Rincon	Bonaire	2016–17 to 2023–24	(Note: Bonaire is not a FIFA member.)
6	APR	Rwanda	2019–20 to 2024–25	
5	Tainan City	Chinese Taipei	2020 to 2024	
5	The New Saints	Wales	2021–22 to 2025–26	

Overall

Titles	Team	Country	Streak	Notes
15	Tafea	Vanuatu	1994 to 2008–09	
14	Lincoln Red Imps	Gibraltar	2002–03 to 2015–16	(Note: Gibraltar did not join UEFA until 2013 and FIFA until 2016.)
14	Skonto	Latvia	1991 to 2004	(Note: Latvia did not join UEFA and did not have its membership in FIFA restored until 1992.)
14	Ludogorets Razgrad	Bulgaria	2011–12 to 2024–25	
13	Al-Faisaly	Jordan	1959 to 1974	(Note: Jordan was not an AFC member at the time.)
13	BATE Borisov	Belarus	2006 to 2018	
13	Rosenborg	Norway	1992 to 2004	
12	Istiklol	Tajikistan	2014 to 2025	
12	Johor Darul Ta'zim	Malaysia	2014 to 2025–26	
11	Al-Ansar	Lebanon	1987–88 to 1998–99	
11	Bayern Munich	Germany	2012–13 to 2022–23	
11	Dinamo Zagreb	Croatia	2005–06 to 2015–16	
11	Lotohaʻapai	Tonga	1998 to 2008	
11	Nauti	Tuvalu	1980 to 1990	(Note: Tuvalu is not a FIFA member, and at the time was not affiliated with the OFC either.)
10	Dinamo Tbilisi	Georgia	1990 to 1998–99	(Note: Georgia did not join UEFA and FIFA until 1992.)
10	Dynamo Berlin	East Germany	1978–79 to 1987–88	(Note: East Germany - List of Champions. RSSSF.)
10	MTK Budapest	Hungary	1913–14 to 1924–25	
10	Nauti	Tuvalu	2007 to 2016	(Note: Tuvalu is not a FIFA member, and is only an associate member of the OFC.)
10	Pyunik	Armenia	2001 to 2010	
10	Red Bull Salzburg	Austria	2013–14 to 2022–23	
10	Sheriff Tiraspol	Moldova	2000–01 to 2009–10	
10	Taiwan Power Company	Chinese Taipei	1994 to 2004	

=== Most championships ===
The below table lists the teams with the most championship titles overall. For some clubs sources may disagree about the numbers of titles won, due to differing views on the legitimacy of some championships or on the historical continuities of clubs that folded and were revived, merged with or split from other clubs, or were rebranded.

Titles	Team	Country	First	Latest	Notes
57	Linfield	Northern Ireland (45); Ireland (12)	1890–91	2024–25	
56	Celtic	Scotland	1892–93	2025–26	
55	Rangers	Scotland	1890–91	2020–21	(Note: Including one shared title of 1890–91.)
52	Peñarol	Uruguay	1900	2024	(Note: The club claims 54 titles, including two of 1924 and 1926 that are not recognised by the AUF, having been organised respectively by the dissident body FUF and by an interim council.)
50	Nacional	Uruguay	1902	2025	
48	Olympiacos	Greece	1930–31	2024–25	
48	Olimpia Asunción	Paraguay	1912	2026 Ap	
47	Olimpia Tegucigalpa	Honduras	1957–58	2025–26 Ap	(Note: Including seven titles of the Honduran Amateur League between 1957–58 and 1964, which some sources do not count.)
45	Al-Ahly	Egypt	1948–49	2024–25	
41	South China	Hong Kong	1923–24	2012–13	
40	Saprissa	Costa Rica	1952	2023–24 Cl	
38	Benfica	Portugal	1935–36	2022–23	
38	River Plate	Argentina	1920	2023	
37	Red Star Belgrade	Serbia (12); Serbia&Montenegro/FR Yugoslavia (5); Yugoslavia (20)	1945–46	2025–26	
36	Ajax	Netherlands	1917–18	2021–22	
36	Al-Muharraq	Bahrain	1956–57	2025–26	
36	Juventus	Italy	1905	2019–20	(Note: The club claims 38 titles, including two of 2004–05 and 2005–06 which were stripped after a match fixing scandal.)
36	Ferencváros	Hungary	1903	2024–25	
36	Real Madrid	Spain	1931–32	2023–24	
35	Al-Faisaly	Jordan	1944	2022	(Note: Jordan did not join FIFA until 1956 and the AFC until 1975.)
35	Boca Juniors	Argentina	1919	2022	
35	Cerro Porteño	Paraguay	1913	2025 Cl	
35	Sparta Prague	Czech Republic (14); Czechoslovakia (21)	1925–26	2023–24	(Note: The club claims 38 titles, including three between 1912 and 1922 which are in fact Bohemian Football Union Championships.) (Note: Czechoslovakia - List of Champions. RSSSF.)
35	Bayern Munich	Germany	1932	2025–26	
35	Dinamo Zagreb	Croatia (26); Yugoslavia (9)	1923	2025–26	(Note: The club claims 35 titles, including 1943 Croatian First League during the war.)
34	Anderlecht	Belgium	1946–47	2016–17	
34	Colo-Colo	Chile	1937	2024	
34	Espérance de Tunis	Tunisia	1941–42	2024–25	(Note: Tunisia did not join CAF and FIFA until 1960.)
33	Diriangén	Nicaragua	1940	2024–25 Ap	
33	HJK Helsinki	Finland	1911	2023	
33	Rapid Wien	Austria (32); Germany (1)	1911–12	2007–08	
33	RCA	Aruba	1938	2022–23	(Note: Aruba did not join CONCACAF until 1986 and FIFA until 1988.)

== See also ==
- List of association football competitions
