= Pablo Gállego =

Spanish-Nicaraguan footballer (born 1993)

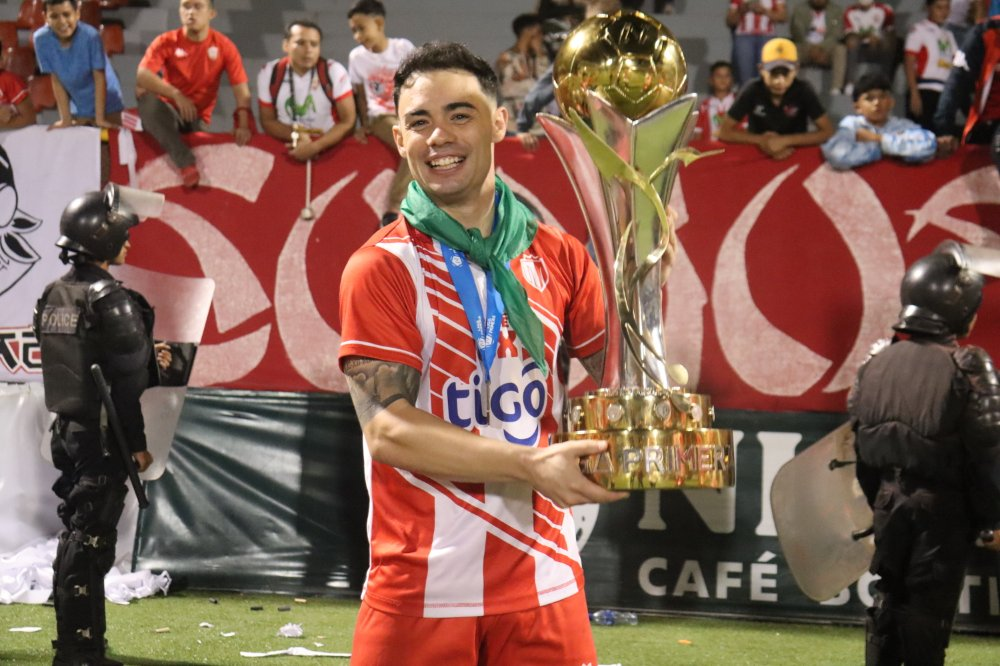
- Gállego with Real Estelí in 2022

Personal information
- Full name: Pablo Gállego Lardiés
- Date of birth: 1 October 1993 (age 33)
- Place of birth: Huesca, Spain
- Height: 1.75 m (5 ft 9 in)
- Position: Winger

Team information
- Current team: Ethnikos Latsion
- Number: 77

Youth career
- Siglo XXI
- –2008: Peña Oscenses
- 2008–2010: Real Zaragoza
- 2010–2012: Huesca

Senior career*
Years	Team	Apps	(Gls)
2012–2014	Almudévar	53	(3)
2013	Huesca	1	(0)
2014	Sariñena	10	(0)
2014–2016	Cacereño	59	(7)
2016–2017	Lealtad	17	(0)
2017	AEL	6	(1)
2018	Real Estelí	14	(7)
2018	Kastrioti	3	(0)
2019	Teruel	6	(0)
2019–2021	Managua	67	(29)
2021	Zemplín Michalovce	0	(0)
2022	Pierikos	3	(0)
2022	Þróttur Vogum	8	(0)
2022	Real Estelí	16	(6)
2023	Resources Capital	11	(1)
2023	Platense	16	(2)
2024	Barbastro	12	(0)
2024	Real Estelí	17	(3)
2025	Managua	7	(1)
2025	Penya Encarnada d'Andorra	10	(1)
2026-	Ethnikos Latsion	13	(1)

International career^{‡}
2022	Nicaragua	2	(1)
- * Club domestic league appearances and goals as of 3 May 2026 ‡ National team caps and goals as of 13 October 2022

Pablo Gállego Lardiés (born 1 October 1993) is a professional footballer who plays as a right winger for Cypriot club Ethnikos Latsion.

Born and raised in Spain to Spanish parents, Gállego has played in the Nicaraguan league and subsequently capped for the Nicaragua national team.

== Club career ==
=== Youth career ===
Gállego began his career in the youth academies of Siglo XXI and Peñas Oscenses, before transferring to the youth setup of Real Zaragoza. After spending two years at Zaragoza, Gállego moved on and signed for Huesca in 2010.

=== Huesca ===
In 2012, after spending two years in the team's youth academy, he gave his professional debut for their second team, Almudévar, where after a great first season his duties where also required in the first team. He gave his debut for Huesca in the Segunda División B, against Las Palmas Atlético in the 2013–14 season.

=== Sariñena ===
In January 2014, he left Huesca after three years, signing for Sariñena, where he continued gaining experience in the Segunda División B.

=== Cacereño ===
Staying for only 6 months, Gállego continued his career at Cacereño, staying for two seasons. In his second season with the team, Gállego showcased his abilities scoring seven goals in 27 league matches. He made a total of 61 games for the club.

=== Lealtad ===
In June 2017, Gállego signed for Lealtad, but again only spent 6 months with the team, as his transfer to Greek Super League team AEL got announced on 20 December 2016.

=== AEL ===
On 4 January 2017, he made his official debut for AEL against Veria, scoring in his debut and being named man of the match. However, after 6 months he just managed to make five more appearances for AEL and was released at the end of the season.

=== Real Estelí ===
After his spell in Greece, he left Europe and signed for Nicaraguan side Real Estelí. In his 6 months with the club, Gállego managed to make a great impact and caught the eye of European clubs.

=== Kastrioti ===
On 31 August 2018, he returned to Europe signing for Albanian team Kastrioti. Not being able to showcase his talent and abilities for his new team, he was released on 7 November 2018 after just appearing in some league matches, one cup game and scoring one goal.

=== Teruel ===
On 2 January 2019, his return to Spain got announced, where he signed for Segunda División B club Teruel.

=== Managua ===
After fulfilling his 6-month contract with Teruel, Gállego returned to Nicaragua signing for Managua in the Liga Primera de Nicaragua. On 12 December 2019, Managua won the Copa de Nicaragua, after beating Diriangén 4–3 in penalties. Gállego played a major role in the teams achievement in finishing runner-up in both the Apertura 2019 and in the Clausura 2020. Managua also managed to reach the final of the Copa de Nicaragua in 2020, however was unable to defend its title, losing 0–1 to Diriangén.

=== Zemplín Michalovce ===
On 30 July 2021, Gállego returned to Europe and signed with Slovak club Zemplín Michalovce in the Fortuna liga.

=== Pierikos ===
After only staying in Slovakia for 5 months, Gállego returned to Greece by singing with Super League 2 club Pierikos.

=== Þróttur Vogum ===
On 21 April 2022, Gállego joined Icelandic second division club Þróttur Vogum.

=== Real Estelí ===
After unsuccessfully trying to find his luck in Europe, Gállego returned to Nicaragua and signed for his former club Real Estelí on 8 July 2022.

=== Resources Capital ===
On 13 January 2023, Gállego joined Resources Capital.

== International career ==
After spending enough time in Nicaragua, Gállego gained citizenship and thus became eligible to play for the national team. According La Prensa, he did not comply with the Nationality Law No. 149 at the moment of his naturalization. On 9 March 2021, national team manager Juan Vita included Gállego into the Nicaragua squad. On 2 February 2022, he scored in his debut in a friendly match against Belize.

== Career statistics ==
=== Club ===
As of 7 May 2023

Club	Season	League	League		Cup (Note: Includes appearances in the Copa del Rey, Greek Football Cup, Kupa e Shqipërisë, Copa Nicaragua, Slovak Cup and Sapling Cup)		Continental (Note: Includes appearances in the CONCACAF League)		Other (Note: Includes appearances in the Segunda División B playoffs, Apertura playoffs and Clausura playoffs)		Total	
Club	Season	League	Apps	Goals	Apps	Goals	Apps	Goals	Apps	Goals	Apps	Goals
Almudévar	2012–13	Tercera División	37	1	–						37	1
Almudévar	2013–14	Tercera División	16	2	–						16	2
Almudévar	Total		53	3	–						53	3
Huesca	2013–14	Segunda División B	1	0	0	0	–				1	0
Sariñena	2013–14	Segunda División B	10	0	–						10	0
Cacereño	2014–15	Segunda División B	32	0	–				–		32	0
Cacereño	2015–16	Segunda División B	27	7	–				2	0	29	7
Cacereño	Total		59	7	–				2	0	61	7
Lealtad	2016–17	Segunda División B	17	0	–						17	0
AEL	2016–17	Super League Greece	6	1	0	0	–				6	1
Real Estelí	Clausura 2018	Liga Primera de Nicaragua	14	7	–				4	1	18	8
Kastrioti	2018–19	Kategoria Superiore	3	0	1	1	–				4	1
Teruel	2018–19	Segunda División B	6	0	0	0	–				6	0
Managua	Apertura 2019	Liga Primera de Nicaragua	17	6	7	5	2	1	5	1	31	13
Managua	Clausura 2020	Liga Primera de Nicaragua	18	8	1	1	–		4	2	23	11
Managua	Apertura 2020	Liga Primera de Nicaragua	17	9	4	0	2	0	–		23	9
Managua	Clausura 2021	Liga Primera de Nicaragua	15	6	1	0	–		5	0	21	6
Managua	Total		67	29	13	6	4	1	14	3	98	39
Zemplín Michalovce	2021–22	Fortuna Liga	0	0	3	0	–		0	0	3	0
Pierikos	2021–22	Super League 2	3	0	0	0	–				3	0
Þróttur Vogum	2022	Lengjudeild	8	0	0	0	–				8	0
Real Estelí	Apertura 2022	Liga Primera de Nicaragua	16	6	0	0	2	0	4	0	22	6
Resources Capital	2022–23	Hong Kong Premier League	11	1	3	0	0	0	0	0	14	1
Career Total			274	54	20	7	6	1	24	4	324	66

=== International ===
National team	Year	Apps	Goals
Nicaragua	2022	1	1
Total		2	1

=== International goals ===
Scores and results list Nicaragua's goal tally first.

No.	Date	Venue	Opponent	Score	Result	Competition
1.	2 February 2022	Estadio Nacional de Fútbol, Managua, Nicaragua	Belize	1–0	1–1	Friendly

== Honours ==
Managua

- Copa Nicaragua: 2019; runners-up: 2020
- Liga Primera de Nicaragua runners-up: Apertura 2019, Clausura 2020, Clausura 2021

Real Estelí

- Liga Primera de Nicaragua: Apertura 2022; runners-up: Clausura 2018
