= Keuka =

Keuka may refer to:

- Keuka Lake
- Keuka College
- Keuka (brand)
