= Edgardo Baldi =

Uruguayan footballer and manager (1944–2016)

Personal information
- Full name: Edgardo Boné Baldi
- Date of birth: 15 July 1944
- Place of birth: Montevideo, Uruguay
- Date of death: 12 December 2016 (aged 72)

Senior career*
Years	Team	Apps	(Gls)
1965–1968	Plaza Colonia		
1969–1970	Club Universidad (Santa Cruz)		
1971	Club Deportivo Stormer's		
1972	Club Bolívar		
1973	Liga Deportiva Alajuelense		
1974	Deportivo Santa Cecilia		

Managerial career
- 1977: Club Deportivo Sandak
- 1978: Búfalos
- 1979: San Francisco
- 1979: Atlético Panamá
- 1979: Panama
- 1980–1983: Club Deportivo Universidad Cruceña
- 1982: Club Independiente Petrolero
- 1984: Ferroviário (Bolivia)
- 1985–1987: Club Deportivo Universidad Cruceña
- 1988–1989: Selecção Provincial
- 1990–1991: Guabirá
- 1996–1997: Ferroviário (Bolivia)
- 1998–1999: Plaza Colonia
- 1999: Club Real Sajonia (women)
- 2000: Náutico Capibaribe
- 2000: Real Brasil E.C.
- 2000–2001: Náutico Capibaribe
- 2002: Progresso E. C.
- 2002: Atlético Rio Negro Clube
- 2003: Royal '95
- 2003–2004: Suriname
- 2005: Club de Fútbol Fraigcomar
- * Club domestic league appearances and goals

Edgardo Boné Baldi (15 July 1944 – 12 December 2016) was a Uruguayan football player and manager.

== Managerial career ==
He had coached teams in Bolivia, Nicaragua, Panama, Uruguay, Brazil and Suriname. Baldi also had coached the Panama national team and Suriname national team in 1979 and 2003–04 respectively.
