= Jonathan Moncada =

Nicaraguan footballer

Personal information
- Full name: Jonathan Enrique Moncada Zeledón
- Date of birth: 3 January 1998 (age 28)
- Place of birth: Estelí, Nicaragua
- Height: 1.75 m (5 ft 9 in)
- Position: Defensive midfielder

Team information
- Current team: Walter Ferretti

Youth career
- Real Estelí

Senior career*
Years	Team	Apps	(Gls)
2018	Spartaks Jūrmala	0	(0)
2018–2019	Real Madriz	30	(4)
2019–2020	Deportivo Ocotal	33	(5)
2020–	Walter Ferretti	69	(6)

International career^{‡}
2018–	Nicaragua	12	(0)
- * Club domestic league appearances and goals as of 19:31, 22 November 2022 (UTC) ‡ National team caps and goals as of 19:31, 22 November 2022 (UTC)

Jonathan Enrique Moncada Zeledón (born 3 January 1998) is a Nicaraguan footballer who plays as a defensive midfielder for the Peruvian club Walter Ferretti and the Nicaragua national team.

== Career ==
A youth product of the Nicaraguan club Real Estelí, Moncada began his senior career with a short stint with the Latvian club Spartaks Jūrmala in 2018. He shortly after returned to Nicaragua with Real Madriz, before moving to Deportivo Ocotal the following season in 2019. He moved to Walter Ferretti in 2021, and helped them win the 2021 Copa Nicaragua.

== International career ==
Moncada debuted with the senior Nicaragua national team in a 6–0 CONCACAF Nations League win over Anguilla on 14 October 2018.

== Honours ==
Walter Ferretti

- Copa de Nicaragua: 2021
