= Bancy Hernández =

Nicaraguan footballer

Personal information
- Full name: Bancy Cristhoffer Hernández Soza
- Date of birth: 27 June 2000 (age 26)
- Place of birth: Río Blanco, Nicaragua
- Height: 1.73 m (5 ft 8 in)
- Position: Winger

Team information
- Current team: Saprissa, on loan from Real Estelí
- Number: 7

Senior career*
Years	Team	Apps	(Gls)
2020–2021	Deportivo Ocotal	32	(2)
2021–2023	Walter Ferretti	37	(7)
2023–2025	Real Estelí	67	(25)
2026–	→Saprissa (loan)	17	(3)

International career^{‡}
2022–	Nicaragua	25	(4)
- * Club domestic league appearances and goals as of 16:46, 1 June 2026 (UTC) ‡ National team caps and goals as of 16:46, 1 June 2026 (UTC)

Bancy Cristhoffer Hernández Soza (born 27 June 2000) is a Nicaraguan professional footballer who plays as a winger for Saprissa in the Costa Rican Primera División, on loan from Real Estelí FC.

== Club career ==
Born in Río Blanco, Nicaragua, Hernández began his professional career with CD Walter Ferretti, making his debut in 2021. He subsequently joined Real Estelí FC in 2023, where he established himself as one of Nicaragua's most prominent attacking players, making 108 appearances and scoring 34 goals while also contributing seven assists. He played a prominent role in Real Estelí's campaigns at CONCACAF Champions Cup level.

In January 2026, Hernández joined Deportivo Saprissa of Costa Rica on a two-year loan deal, becoming one of the few Nicaraguan players to compete in the Costa Rican Primera División. In his first season with the club, he made 21 appearances in the Clausura 2026, scoring three goals and providing five assists, finishing as the second player with most appearances for the club that tournament.

== International career ==
Hernández made his debut for the Nicaragua senior national team on 29 January 2022. He has since become a regular fixture in the squad, earning 24 caps and scoring four goals across CONCACAF Nations League, World Cup qualifying and international friendlies.

=== International goals ===
Scores and results list Nicaragua's goal tally first.

List of international goals scored by Bancy Hernández
No.	Date	Venue	Opponent	Score	Result	Competition
1	8 June 2024	FFB Stadium, Belmopan, Belize	Belize	1–0	4–0	2026 FIFA World Cup qualification
2	8 June 2024	FFB Stadium, Belmopan, Belize	Belize	3–0	4–0	2026 FIFA World Cup qualification
3	1 June 2025	Centreville Bank Stadium, Pawtucket, United States	Puerto Rico	1–1	1–1	Friendly
4	13 November 2025	Estadio Nacional, Managua, Nicaragua	Honduras	1–0	2–0	2026 FIFA World Cup qualification

== Honours ==
Walter Ferretti

- Copa de Nicaragua: 2021, 2022

Real Estelí

- Copa de Nicaragua: 2023
