= Deportivo Universidad Centroamericana =

Association football club in Nicaragua

UCA
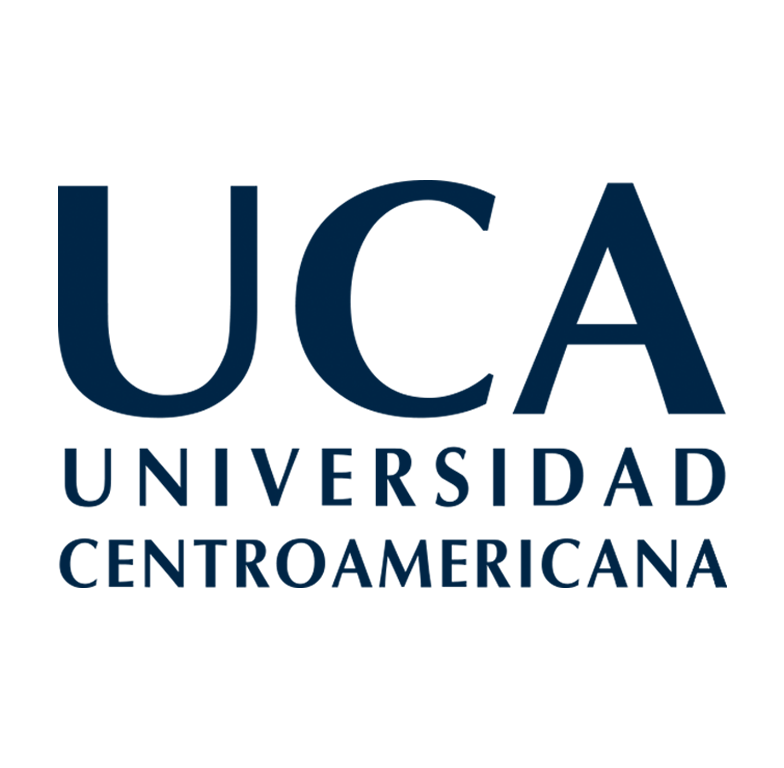
- Full name: Deportiva Universidad de Centroamericana
- Nickname: Académicos
- Founded: 1950
- Ground: Cancha de la Universidad Centroamericana, Managua, Nicaragua
- Capacity: 1,500
Home colours	Away colours

Deportivo Universidad de Centroamericana , commonly known as UCA, is a Nicaraguan football team which currently competes in the fourth division. The club represents the Central American University (Managua) (UCA).

== History ==
Based in Managua, they have won four league titles, including three straight from 1975 to 1977. However, they are no longer a top flight team and have not won a title since 1977.

== Honours ==
- Primera División de Nicaragua: 4

1968, 1975 ,1976, 1977

== List of managers ==
- (Argentina) Omar Muraco (1968)
- (Nicaragua) Armando Arroyo (1975-1977)
- (Nicaragua) Manuel Cuarda Serrano (1984)
- (Spain) José María Beltrán
