= Brandon Ayerdis =

Nicaraguan footballer (born 1994)

Personal information
- Date of birth: 11 September 1994 (age 32)
- Place of birth: Jinotepe, Nicaragua
- Positions: Striker; left winger

Team information
- Current team: Real Estelí
- Number: 18

Senior career*
Years	Team	Apps	(Gls)
2017–2019	Juventus Managua	51	(17)
2019–	Real Estelí	67	(8)

International career^{‡}
2018–	Nicaragua	10	(0)
- * Club domestic league appearances and goals as of 10 February 2021. ‡ National team caps and goals as of 10 October 2020.

Brandon Ayerdis (born 11 September 1994) is a Nicaraguan professional footballer who plays as a striker for Liga Primera club Real Estelí and the Nicaragua national team.
