= Salvador Dubois =

Nicaraguan footballer (1939–2015)

Personal information
- Full name: Joaquín Salvador Dubois Leiva
- Date of birth: 16 August 1935
- Place of birth: La Libertad, Nicaragua
- Date of death: 11 July 2015 (aged 79)
- Place of death: Managua, Nicaragua
- Position: Goalkeeper

Youth career
- Dínamo de Managua

Senior career*
Years	Team	Apps	(Gls)
1961–1967	Santa Cecilia		
1968–1974	Motagua	92	(0)
1974	América		

International career
	Nicaragua	10	(0)

Managerial career
- 1977: Nicaragua
- Santa Cecilia
- Búfalos
- MINT
- 1984: Walter Ferretti
- Juventus
- 1991–1992: Nicaragua
- 1998: Masachapa
- UNAN
- * Club domestic league appearances and goals

Joaquín Salvador Dubois Leiva (16 August 1935 – 11 July 2015) was a Nicaraguan professional footballer who played as a goalkeeper.

== Club career ==
He started his career at Santa Cecilia and moved abroad to play for Honduran giants F.C. Motagua for whom he would play 92 league matches. He returned to Nicaragua for a final season at América 5 years later.

== International career ==
Dubois represented Nicaragua at the 1975 Pan American Games.

== Managerial career ==
Dubois managed Nicaragua and several clubs in Nicaragua at different levels. After three years working for the (Nicaraguan FA (FENIFUT)) as Academy supervisor, he also joined Walter Ferretti as goalkeeper coach.
