= Búfalos FC =

Nicaraguan football club

- Full name: Búfalos Futbol Club
- Ground: Managua, Nicaragua
- Manager: Wascar Montenegro

Búfalos Futbol Club, commonly known as Búfalos, is a Nicaraguan football team which used to play at the top level.

The team is based in Managua and has won one league title.

== Achievements ==
- Primera División de Nicaragua: 1

1980

== List of managers ==
- (Nicaragua) Eduardo “Caramelo” Terán (1983–1984)
- (Nicaragua) Salvador Dubois Leiva
- (Uruguay) Edgardo Baldi (1978)
