= Deportivo Masaya FC =

Nicaraguan football club

- Full name: Deportivo Masaya Fútbol Club
- Nicknames: El Equipo del Pueblo (The Peoples Team); Depor; Los Leones (The Lions)
- Founded: 1978
- Ground: Arnoldo and Matty Chávez Soccer Sports Complex, Masaya, Nicaragua
- Capacity: 6000
- Chairman: (Nicaragua) Magaly Álvarez
- Manager: (Colombia) Alex Basave
- League: Segunda División de Nicaragua - Group A
Home colours	Away colours

Deportivo Masaya is a football team in Nicaragua playing in the Segunda División de Nicaragua, the second category of football in the country.

== History ==
Deportivo Masaya were founded in 1978 in the Masaya Department, in Nicaragua. Thanks to the efforts of husband and wife, Don Arnoldo and Matty Chávez, they quickly began to gain a following. After five years they gained their first major trophy, the Copa de Nicaragua in 1983.

There followed a golden age for the club, winning their first Liga Primera de Nicaragua in 1984. After a failed defence of their title, they took their second league title in 1986. "El Equipo del Pueblo" (The Peoples Club) had made their mark on Nicaraguan football.

The clubs history has not been easy, however, has endured a tough existence since those heady glory days and have slipped out of the top flight. They are challenging to get the club back in to the top flight. The club is run as community club and wants to continue contributing to the community through sport, trying to help the young people of Masaya "The city of flowers", find a healthy and more productive path through football.

== Honours ==
- Primera División de Nicaragua and predecessors
  - Champions (2): 1984, 1986
- Copa de Nicaragua:
  - Champions (1): 1983

== Squad 2019 ==
Note: Flags indicate national team as defined under FIFA eligibility rules; some limited exceptions apply. Players may hold more than one non-FIFA nationality.

No.	Pos.	Nation	Player
—	GK	NCA	R. Carballo
—	GK	NCA	R. Flores
—	DF	NCA	L. Baltodano
—	DF	NCA	J. Gómez
—	DF	NCA	E. González
—	DF	NCA	F. Herrera
—	DF	COL	C. López
—	DF	NCA	E. Martínez
—	DF	NCA	R. Rocha
—	MF	COL	R. Buitrago
—	MF	NCA	L. Corrales
—	MF	NCA	B. Espinoza
—	MF	NCA	C. Guevara
—	MF	NCA	C. Useda
—	FW	NCA	B. Acuña
—	FW	NCA	B. Aviles
—	FW	NCA	J. Gutiérrez
—	FW	NCA	J. Mendoza
—	FW	COL	A. Nariño
—	FW	COL	J. Valoyes

== Coaching staff ==
Position	Name
Head coach	(Colombia) Alex Basave
Technical directors	(Nicaragua) Alexander Basabe
Technical directors	(Nicaragua) Milton Bustos
Technical directors	(Nicaragua) Carlos Gonzalez
Goalkeeping coach	(Nicaragua) Noel Obando
Club doctor	(Nicaragua) Hammond Williams

== Former players ==
- (Nicaragua) Antonio Escorcia
- (Nicaragua) Javier Martínez
- (Nicaragua) Omar Blandón
- (Nicaragua) Carlos Téllez
- (Nicaragua) Gustavo Montenegro
- (Nicaragua) José Montenegro
- (El Salvador) Heriberto
- (Brazil) Boanerges Franco
- (Nicaragua) Guillermo Castillo
- (Nicaragua) Roberto Castillo
- (El Salvador) Andrés Gauna
- (Nicaragua) Samuel Páramo
- (Nicaragua) Javier Martínez
- (Nicaragua) Alejandro Ortega
- (Nicaragua) Marlon González
- (Nicaragua) Balford Montenegro
- (Nicaragua) Alfonso Jirón
- (Nicaragua) Julio Flores

== List of coaches ==
- (Panama) Juan Ramírez (June 2018 − December 2018)
- (Nicaragua) Milton Bustos (2019 − December 2021)
- (Nicaragua) Giovanny Vivas (January 2022 − TBD)
- (Colombia) Jose Gomez (November 2024 − present)
