= Abner Acuña =

Nicaraguan footballer

Personal information
- Full name: Abner Jonathan Acuña Álvarez
- Date of birth: 5 March 1997 (age 29)
- Place of birth: Jinotepe, Nicaragua
- Height: 1.75 m (5 ft 9 in)
- Position: Midfielder

Team information
- Current team: Diriangén

Senior career*
Years	Team	Apps	(Gls)
2015–	Diriangén	134	(14)

International career^{‡}
2018–	Nicaragua	2	(0)
- * Club domestic league appearances and goals as of 30 September 2020 ‡ National team caps and goals as of 14 October 2019

Abner Jonathan Acuña Álvarez (born 5 March 1997) is a Nicaraguan professional footballer who plays as a midfielder for Liga Primera club Diriangén and the Nicaragua national team.
