= Fernando Villalpando =

Mexican footballer (born 1996)

Personal information
- Full name: Fernando Villalpando Domínguez
- Date of birth: 2 September 1996 (age 30)
- Place of birth: Juchipila, Zacatecas, México
- Height: 1.80 m (5 ft 11 in)
- Position: Forward

Youth career
- 2013–2015: Toluca
- 2017: Mineros de Zacatecas

Senior career*
Years	Team	Apps	(Gls)
2018–2020	Mineros de Zacatecas	1	(0)
2018	→ Tuxtla (loan)	10	(3)
2019	→ La Piedad (loan)	4	(0)
2020–2021	Walter Ferretti	33	(15)
2021	Sporting Canamy	5	(1)
- * Club domestic league appearances and goals as of February 4, 2021

Fernando Villalpando Domínguez (born 2 September 1996) is a Mexican footballer who plays as a forward for CD Walter Ferretti. Pertenece a la agencia de Representación Aspisal Sports Developments

A native of Juchipila, Villalpando began playing youth football with Deportivo Toluca F.C., eventually training with the club's senior side. After a career playing in the lower levels of Mexican club football, Villalpando moved to Nicaragua where he led the league in scoring.
