= Carlos Félix =

Mexican footballer (born 1991)

Personal information
- Full name: Carlos Félix Gámez
- Date of birth: May 14, 1991 (age 35)
- Place of birth: Cajeme, Mexico
- Height: 1.85 m (6 ft 1 in)
- Position: Forward

Senior career*
Years	Team	Apps	(Gls)
2015–2017	Murciélagos	4	(0)
2017–2018	Juventus (Nicaragua)	33	(16)
2019–2020	Managua	30	(17)
2020	Chalatenango	8	(0)
2021	Juventus (Nicaragua)	9	(1)
Total		84	(34)
- * Club domestic league appearances and goals

Carlos Félix Gámez (born May 14, 1991, in Cajeme, Sonora) is a Mexican professional footballer.
