= Josué Quijano =

Nicaraguan footballer

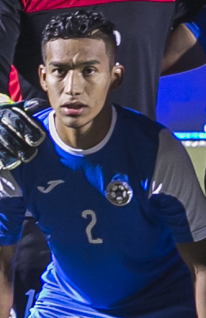
- Quijano with Nicaragua in 2017

Personal information
- Full name: Josué Abraham Quijano Potosme
- Date of birth: March 10, 1991 (age 35)
- Place of birth: Masaya, Nicaragua
- Height: 1.63 m (5 ft 4 in)
- Position: Defender

Team information
- Current team: Real Estelí
- Number: 27

Senior career*
Years	Team	Apps	(Gls)
2010–2011	CaRuNa RL		
2011–2015	Walter Ferretti	30	(0)
2015–	Real Estelí	162	(6)

International career^{‡}
2011–	Nicaragua	104	(3)
- * Club domestic league appearances and goals as of 8 July 2017 (UTC) ‡ National team caps and goals as of 10 June 2025

Josué Abraham Quijano Potosme (born March 10, 1991) is a Nicaraguan professional footballer who plays as a defender for Liga Primera club Real Estelí and the Nicaragua national team.

== Club career ==
Quijano joined Walter Ferretti from hometown club CaRuNa RL.

=== Motorcycle accident ===
In summer 2013 he needed to be hospitalized after breaking his knee in an accident with his motorcycle also involving teammate Milton Busto. He was expected to return to playing football in six months.

== International career ==
Quijano made his debut for Nicaragua in a January 2011 Copa Centroamericana match against El Salvador. As of October 2024, he has earned a total of 99 caps, scoring 3 goals, being nation's most capped player. He has represented his country in 4 FIFA World Cup qualification matches and played at the 2011 and 2013 Copa Centroamericana.

=== International goals ===
Scores and results list Nicaragua's goal tally first.

No.	Date	Venue	Opponent	Score	Result	Competition
1	18 January 2013	Estadio Nacional, San José, Costa Rica	Guatemala	1–0	1–1	2013 Copa Centroamericana
2	3 June 2022	Estadio Nacional, Managua, Nicaragua	Trinidad and Tobago	1–0	2–1	2022–23 CONCACAF Nations League B
3	24 September 2022	Estadio Francisco Artés Carrasco, Lorca, España	Suriname	1–2	2–1	Friendly
