= 2022–23 Liga Primera =

Liga Primera
- Season: 2022–23
- Champions: Apertura: Real Estelí; Clausura: Real Estelí
- Relegated: Juventus Managua
- CONCACAF Central American Cup: Real Estelí; Diriangén
- Matches: 196
- Goals: 459 (2.34 per match)
- Top goalscorer: Apertura: (Brazil) Lucas dos Santos (16 goals); Clausura: (Colombia) Arly Bonilla (15 goals)
- Biggest home win: Apertura: Juventus Managua 9–0 Ocotal (1 December 2022); Clausura: Diriangén 5–1 CS Sebaco (21 April 2023)
- Biggest away win: Apertura: TBD 3-5 TBD; Clausura: Juventus Managua 0–7 Real Esteli F.C. (6 April 2023)
- Highest scoring: Apertura: TBD 4-8 TBD; Clausura: Juventus Managua 0–7 Real Esteli F.C. (6 April 2023)
- All statistics correct as of 28 June 2022.

The 2022–23 Liga Primera de Nicaragua season was to be divided into two tournaments, Apertura and Clausura. The season will determine the 79th and 80th champions in the history of the Liga Primera de Nicaragua, the top division of football in Nicaragua. The Apertura tournament is to be played in the second half of 2022, while the Clausura is to be played in the first half of 2023.

== Teams ==
=== Team information ===
A total of ten teams contested the league, including nine sides from the 2021–22 Primera División, and one side from the 2021–22 Segunda División.

Real Madriz finished last in the aggregate table and were relegated to the Segunda División. The champions from the Segunda División, Matagalpa FC, were promoted in their place.

The 9th place team in the aggregate table, ART Jalapa, faced the second-place team from the Segunda División, CD Junior, in a playoff for a spot in the Primera División. ART Jalapa won 4–3 over two legs, meaning ART Jalapa remained in the Primera División.

=== Promotion and relegation ===
Promoted from Segunda División as of June, 2022.

- Champions: Matagalpa

Relegated to Segunda División as of June, 2022.

- Last Place: Real Madriz

=== Stadiums and locations ===
Team	Location	Stadium	Capacity
ART Municipal Jalapa	Jalapa	Estadio Alejandro Ramos Turcio	2,000
Diriangén	Diriamba	Estadio Cacique Diriangén	8,500
Juventus	Managua	Estadio Olímpico del IND Managua	7,000
Sport Sébaco	Matagalpa	Estadio Municipal de Matagalpa	1,800
Managua	Managua	Estadio Nacional de Fútbol (UNAN)	15,000
Ocotal	Ocotal	Estadio Roy Fernando Bermúdez	7,000
Real Estelí	Estelí	Estadio Independencia	4,800
Matagalpa	Matagalpa	Estadio Municipal de Matagalpa	1,800
UNAN Managua	Managua	Estadio Nacional de Fútbol (UNAN)	15,000
Walter Ferretti	Managua	Estadio Nacional de Fútbol (UNAN)	15,000

=== Personnel and kits ===
Team	Chairman	Head coach	Captain	Kit manufacturer	Shirt sponsor(s)
ART Municipal Jalapa	TBD	(Colombia) Luis Javier Londoño *	(Uruguay) Bernardo Laureiro *	Keuka	AT&T
Diriangén	TBD	(Argentina) Roberto Armando Chanampe *	(Nicaragua) TBD	Macron	AT&T
Juventus	TBD	(Nicaragua) Alexis Zepeda *	(Nicaragua) Jhans Mina *	Keuka	AT&T
HYH Sebaco	TBD	(Costa Rica) Glen Blanco *	(Nicaragua) Luis Galeano *	Keuka	AT&T
Matagalpa	TBD	(Nicaragua) Oscar Castillo *	(Nicaragua) Rodolfo Forbes *	Keuka	AT&T
Managua	TBD	(Nicaragua) Emilio Aburto *	(Nicaragua) Kevin Serapio *	Keuka	AT&T
Ocotal	TBD	(Honduras) Nelson Vasquez *	(Nicaragua) TBD	Keuka	AT&T
Real Estelí	TBD	(Nicaragua) Ramon Otoneil Olivas *	(Nicaragua) Josué Quijano *	Keuka	AT&T
UNAN Managua	TBD	(Nicaragua) Eduardo Urroz *	(Nicaragua) Anderson Tremio *	Joma	AT&T
Walter Ferretti	TBD	(Nicaragua) Luis Diaz *	(Nicaragua) Denis Espinoza *	Keuka	AT&T

== News ==
=== Shirt sponsorship ===
Keuka agreed to sponsor 8 teams in the Liga Primera (2 teams not being sponsored is Diriangén and UNAN Managua) starting in the Clausura 2023.

== Managerial changes ==
=== Pre-season Apertura 2022 ===
Team	Outgoing manager	Manner of departure	Date of vacancy	Replaced by	Date of appointment	Position in table
Ocotal	(Nicaragua) Mario Alfaro	Contract Ended	June 2022	(Honduras) Nelson Vásquez	June 2022	TBD (Apertura 2021)
Diriangén	(Nicaragua) Tyrone Leiva	Contract Ended	May 2022	(Argentina) Roberto Chanampe	June 2022	TBD (Apertura 2021)
Real Estelí	(Mexico) José Luis Trejo Montoya	Contract Ended	July 2022	(Nicaragua) Ramon Otoneil Olivas	July 2022	TBD (Apertura 2021)

=== During the Apertura season ===
Team	Outgoing manager	Manner of departure	Date of vacancy	Replaced by	Date of appointment	Position in table
Matagalpa FC	(Nicaragua) Oscar Castillo	Sacked	August 2022	(Nicaragua) Sting Fabricio López	August 2022	TBD (Apertura 2022)
Managua FC	(Spain) Juan Cortez	Sacked	August 2022	(Nicaragua) Emilio Aburto	August 2022	TBD (Apertura 2022)

=== Pre-season Clausura 2023 ===
Team	Outgoing manager	Manner of departure	Date of vacancy	Replaced by	Date of appointment	Position in table
Managua	(Nicaragua) Emilio Aburto	Contract Ended	December 2022	(Brazil) Flavio Da Silva	December 15, 2022	TBD (Apertura 2022)
ART Municipal Jalapa	(Colombia) Luis Javier Londono	Contract Ended	December 2022	(Argentina) Carlos Javier Martino	28 December 2022	TBD (Apertura 2022)
HYH Sebaco	(Costa Rica) Glen Blanco	Contract Ended	December 2022	(Honduras) Héctor Medina	December 28, 2022	TBD (Apertura 2022)
Matagalpa FC	(Nicaragua) Sting Lopez	Contract Ended	December 2022	(Costa Rica) Glen Blanco	January 3, 2023	TBD (Apertura 2022)
Deportivo Ocotal	(Honduras) Nelson Vasquez	Contract Ended	December 2022	(Nicaragua) Sting Lopez	January 3, 2023	TBD (Apertura 2022)

=== During Clausura 2023 ===
Team	Outgoing manager	Manner of departure	Date of vacancy	Replaced by	Date of appointment	Position in table
Municipal Jalapa	(Argentina) Carlos Javier Martino	Sacked	February 22, 2023	(Nicaragua) Ricardo Gaitan	February 2023	TBD (Apertura 2022)

== Apertura 2022 ==
=== Finals ===
==== Quarterfinals ====
December 4, 2022

H&H Sebaco	0-5	Managua
Nil		Kevin Serapio 15'; Oscar Soto 33'; Angel Velásquez 36'; Agenor Báez 64'; Diego Arceo 75'

Estadio Municipal de Matagalpa , Matagalpa

Managua progressed.

December 5, 2022

Deportivo Walter Ferretti	5-1	Juventus Managua
Francisco Ramos 9' 56'; Luciano Sanhueza 68' 80'; Alexis Somarriba 90'		Lucas Dos Santos 75'

Estadio Cacique Diriangén, Diriamba

Walter Ferretti progressed.

==== Semi-finals ====
Team 1	Agg.	Team 2	1st leg	2nd leg
Walter Ferretti	4-3	Diriangén	2–3	2-0
Real Estelí	2-0	Managua	0-0	2–0

December 9, 2022
18:00

Walter Ferretti	1-1	Diriangén
Francisco Ramos 60'		Junio Arteaga 68'

Estadio Independencia, Esteli

December 12, 2022
17:00

Diriangén	1-1	Walter Ferretti
Junio Arteaga 116'		Ezequiel Ugalde 91'

Estadio Cacique, Diriamba

2-2 on aggregate, Walter Ferretti won 5–3 on penalties.

December 9, 2022
16:00

Managua	0-0	Real Estelí
Nil		Nil

Estadio Cacique, Diriamba

December 12, 2022
19:00

Real Estelí	2-0	Managua
Douglas Caé 66'; Harold Medina 73'		Nil

Estadio Independencia, Esteli

Real Estelí won 2–0 on aggregate.

==== Final ====
===== First leg =====
15 December 2022
12:00 (UTC-6)

Walter Ferretti	2-3	Real Estelí
Francisco Ramos 28'; Luciano Sanhueza 57'		Douglas Caé 36' 81'; Ewerton Bezerra 50'

Estadio Cacique Diriangén, Diriamba
Referee: Erick Lezama

===== Second leg =====
18 December 2022
12:00 (UTC-6)

Real Estelí	1-2	Walter Ferretti
Harold Medina 50'		Yeison Mosquera 62'; Ronald Lopez 66'

Estadio Independencia, Esteli
Referee: Willer Lopez

4-4 on Aggregate. Real Esteli won 4–3 on penalties

Apertura 2022 champions

19th title

== Clausura 2023 ==
=== Standings ===
Pos	Team	Pld	W	D	L	GF	GA	GD	Pts	Qualification
1	Diriangén (Q)	18	12	3	3	36	19	+17	39	Advance to Playoffs (Semifinals)
2	Real Estelí (Q)	18	10	5	3	37	19	+18	35	Advance to Playoffs (Semifinals)
3	Managua (Q)	18	8	5	5	26	23	+3	29	Advance to Playoffs (Quarterfinals)
4	Walter Ferretti (Q)	18	7	5	6	26	24	+2	26	Advance to Playoffs (Quarterfinals)
5	Matagalpa (Q)	18	7	4	7	19	19	0	25	Advance to Playoffs (Quarterfinals)
6	Deportivo Ocotal (Q)	18	7	3	8	24	24	0	24	Advance to Playoffs (Quarterfinals)
7	UNAN Managua	18	5	5	8	24	25	−1	20	
8	Municipal Jalapa	18	5	4	9	21	30	−9	19	
9	H&H Export Sébaco FC	18	5	4	9	21	32	−11	19	
10	Juventus Managua	18	3	4	11	19	38	−19	13	

Updated to match(es) played on 2 May 2023. Source:
Rules for classification: 1) points; 2) goal difference; 3) number of goals scored; 4) head-to-head points; 5) head-to-head goal difference; 6) head-to-head goals scored; 7) draw.
(Q) Qualified for the phase indicated

=== Finals ===
==== Quarterfinals ====
April 27, 2023

Managua	3-1	Deportivo Ocotal
Brian Calabrese 26'; Henry Nino 48'; Doslin Garcia 69'		Yubeiquer Arenas 7'

Estadio Nacional de futbol , Managua

Managua progressed.

April 28, 2023

Deportivo Walter Ferretti	1-1	Matagalpa
Ezequiel Ugalde 40'		Rodolfo Forbes 25'

Estadio Nacional de futbol , Managua

Matagalpa progressed, winning 9-8 penalties.

==== Semifinals ====
Team 1	Agg.	Team 2	1st leg	2nd leg
Diriangén	5-0	Matagalpa	2–0	3-0
Real Estelí	3-3 (pen 4-3)	Managua	1-0	2–3

May 1, 2023
18:00

Matagalpa	0-2	Diriangén
Nil		Carlos Torres 39'; Luis Fernando Coronel 52'

Estadio Independencia, Esteli

May 7, 2023
17:00

Diriangén	3-0	Matagalpa
Junio Arteaga; Carlos Torres Frobes; Dshon Frobes		Nil

Estadio Cacique, Diriamba

Diriangén won 5–0 on aggregate.

December 9, 2022
16:00

Managua	0-1	Real Estelí
Nil		Juan Barrera 23'

Estadio Cacique, Diriamba

December 12, 2022
19:00

Real Estelí	2-3	Managua
Douglas Caé 66'; Harold Medina 73'		Douglas Caé 66'; Harold Medina 73'

Estadio Independencia, Esteli

3-3 on aggregate, Real Esteli won 4–3 on penalties.

==== Final ====
===== First leg =====
15 May 2023
12:00 (UTC-6)

Real Estelí	0-0	Diriangén
Nil		Nil

Estadio Independencia, Estelí
Referee: Willer Lopez

===== Second leg =====
21 May 2023
11:00 (UTC-6)

Diriangén	0-3	Real Estelí
		Harold Medina 41' 92'; Byron Bonilla 49'

Estadio Cacique Diriangén, Diriamba
Referee: Ricardo Mendoza

Real Esteli won 3–0 on Aggregate

Clausura 2023 champions

20th title

== List of foreign players in the league ==
This is a list of foreign players in the 2022–23 season. The following players:

1. Have played at least one game for the respective club.
2. Have not been capped for the Nicaragua national football team on any level, independently from the birthplace

A new rule was introduced this season, that clubs can have four foreign players per club and can only add a new player if there is an injury or a player/s is released, and it is before the closing of the season transfer window.

ART Jalapa

- (Colombia) Jafet del Portillo
- (Honduras) Allan Medina
- (Uruguay) Bernando Laureiro *
- (Colombia) Juan Murillo
- (Colombia) Andrés Cortobarria
- (Honduras) Denier Bonilla
- (Honduras) Alfredo Oscar Rosales
- (Honduras) Josué Lozano
- (Cuba) Maykel Reyes

Diriangén

- (Brazil) Robinson Luiz
- (Colombia) Jhon Mosquera *
- (Mexico) Taufic Guarch
- (Argentina) Jonathan Pacheco
- (Argentina) Ramiro Peters
- (Argentina) Carlos Tórres
- (Brazil) Patrick Torelli

Juventus Managua

- (Brazil) Lucas Dos Santos
- (Brazil) Rafael Vieira (*)
- (Colombia) David Castrillón (*)
- (Mexico) Bernardo Gradilla (*)

CS Sebaco

- (Argentina) Miguel Pucharella (*)
- (Argentina) Franco Rondina
- (Honduras) Brayan Zúñiga (*)
- (Venezuela) Miguel Soza (*)
- (Colombia) Miguel Morales

Managua

- (Colombia) Juan Sebastián Arce
- (Paraguay) Diego Areco
- (Honduras) Ángel Velásquez (*)
- (Honduras) Kevin Castro (*)
- (Mexico) Carlo Vasquez
- (Brazil) Robinson Luiz
- (Brazil) Lucas Dos Santos
- (Mexico) Taufic Guarch
- (Argentina) Brian Calabrese

Matagalpa FC

- (Colombia) Willian Morales
- (Costa Rica) Sebastián Barquero
- (Costa Rica) Bryan Marín
- (Brazil) Rafael de Almeida
- (Panama) Rogelio Robinson

Ocotal

- (Colombia) Juan Castaño
- (Colombia) Juan Marín
- (Colombia) Jean Rentería
- (Colombia) Kenverlen López
- (Colombia) New Mena
- (Colombia) Dandy Choles
- (Colombia) Yubeiquer Arenas
- (Honduras) Gabriel Ortiz
- (Honduras) Carlos Daniel Duran
- (Honduras) Edwin Castro
- (Honduras) Allan Medina
- (Honduras) Ricardo Medina

Real Estelí

- (Argentina) Fabián Monserrat
- (Brazil) Vinicius da Souza
- (Brazil) Ewerton da Silva
- (Brazil) Douglas Caé
- (Colombia) José Ortiz Castillo
- (Colombia) Alex Chandler
- (Spain) Pablo Gállego
- (Argentina) Juan Manuel Trejo
- (Brazil) Sidney Pages

UNAM Managua

- (Colombia) Jerson Lora (*)
- (Colombia) Sebastian Alzáte
- (Ghana) Joseph Donkor
- (Brazil) Robinson Luiz
- (Brazil) Lucas Dos Santos
- (Brazil) Pedro Dos Santos
- (Cuba) Eugenio Palmero

Walter Ferretti

- (Argentina) Luciano Sanhueza (*)
- (Colombia) Ariel Torregrosa (*)
- (Colombia) Yeison Mosquera (*)
- (Colombia) Cesar Vente Contención *
- (Colombia) Maykel Reyes

(player released during the Apertura season) (player released between the Apertura and Clausura seasons) (player released during the Clausura season)
