= Milton Busto =

Nicaraguan footballer

Personal information
- Full name: Milton Ángel Busto García
- Date of birth: April 19, 1982 (age 44)
- Place of birth: Masaya, Nicaragua
- Position: Midfielder

Team information
- Current team: Walter Ferretti

Senior career*
Years	Team	Apps	(Gls)
2001–2002	Walter Ferretti		
2002–2003	Masatepe		
2003–2004	Walter Ferretti		
2004–2008	Diriangén		
2008–2009	Masatepe		
2009–2011	Xilotepelt		
2011–	Walter Ferretti		

International career^{‡}
2004–2011	Nicaragua	11	(2)
- * Club domestic league appearances and goals as of 00:58, 25 February 2012 (UTC) ‡ National team caps and goals as of 00:58, 25 February 2012 (UTC)

Milton Ángel Busto García (born April 19, 1982) is a Nicaraguan professional midfielder currently playing for Walter Ferretti.

== Club career ==
A versatile player, Busto has played in attack, midfield and defense for several clubs in the Nicaraguan premier division, most notable 5 years with Diriangén. He did not play in Xilotepelt's relegation play-off defeat by Chinandega in June 2011 and rejoined his first club Walter Ferretti.

=== Motorcycle accident ===
In summer 2013 he was injured in an accident with a motorcycle also involving teammate Josué Quijano.

== International career ==
Busto made his debut for Nicaragua in an April 2004 friendly match against Bermuda and has, as of December 2013, earned a total of 11 caps, scoring 2 goals. He has represented his country in 1 FIFA World Cup qualification match and played at the 2005, 2007 and 2011 UNCAF Nations Cups.

His final international was a January 2011 Copa Centroamericana match against Guatemala.

=== International goals ===
Scores and results list Honduras' goal tally first.

N.	Date	Venue	Opponent	Score	Result	Competition
1.	19 February 2005	Estadio Mateo Flores, Guatemala City, Guatemala	Honduras	1–3	1–5	2005 UNCAF Nations Cup
2.	12 February 2007	Estadio Cuscatlán, San Salvador, El Salvador	Belize	3–1	4–2	2007 UNCAF Nations Cup
