= Deportivo Santa Cecilia =

Association football club in Nicaragua

- Full name: Corporación Deportiva Santa Cecilia
- Ground: Campo Deportiva Santa Cecilia Municipal, Diriamba, Nicaragua

Corporación Deportiva Santa Cecilia is a Nicaraguan football team that used to play at the top level.

== History ==
Based in Diriamba, Santa Cecilia was once one of the dominant powers in Nicaraguan football. They won national titles in 1961, 1965, and then three straight from 1971-73. The ensuing years have not been kind to Santa Cecilia, and they currently play in the third division.

== Achievements ==
- Primera División de Nicaragua: 5

1961, 1965 ,1971, 1972, 1973

== List of players ==
- (Nicaragua) Hugo “Bazooka” Huete (1964-1967)
- (Nicaragua) Miguel Buitrago “El Chocorrón” (1963-1967)
- (Nicaragua) Emerson Flores

== List of managers ==
- (Argentina) Santiago Berrini
- (Nicaragua) Salvador Dubois Leiva
- (Nicaragua) Jose Miguel Urtecho Gutiérrez
- (Uruguay) Julio Kellman
