= Omar Muraco =

Argentine footballer (1930–2010)

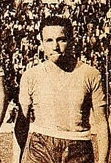

Personal information
- Full name: Omar Ernesto Muraco Nappa
- Date of birth: 1930
- Place of birth: Argentina
- Date of death: 28 November 2010 (aged 80)
- Place of death: Guatemala

Senior career*
| Years | Team | Apps | (Gls) |
| 1948–1950 | Huracán | | |
- Ciclista Lima
| 1957–1958 | FAS | 18 | (36) |
| 1959 | Águila | | |
| 1959-1960 | Escuintla | | |
| 1960 | Montréal Concordia | | |
| 1961-1964 | Municipal | | |

Managerial career
- 1969–1970: Nicaragua
- 1969-1972: Cementos Novela
- 1975: Aurora
- 1977: Motagua
- 1978: Panama
- 1979: Victoria
- Marathón
- Municipal
- Tipografia Nacional
- Mictlán
- 1980: Puntarenas
- 1985: Aguila
- Dragon
- * Club domestic league appearances and goals

Omar Ernesto Muraco Nappa (1930 – 28 November 2010) was a football player and manager who played as a forward. He notably managed the Nicaragua and the Panama national teams. Nicknamed el Petiso Goleador, Muraco played two seasons with FAS, winning one championship with the club which included him winning top goalscorer for the season with 22 goals.

== Honours ==
=== Club honours ===
==== As a player ====
- FAS
  - Primera División de Fútbol de El Salvador (La Primera) ():

==== As a coach ====
- Aurora
  - Liga Nacional de Guatemala (1): 1975
- TBD
  - La Primera (2): TBD
- TBD
  - La Primera (1): TBD
