= Liga Primera =

Nicaraguan association football league

- Organising body: Nicaraguan Football Federation
- Founded: 1933; 93 years ago
- Country: Nicaragua
- Confederation: CONCACAF
- Number of clubs: 10
- Level on pyramid: 1
- Relegation to: Liga Ascenso (based on agg. table)
- Domestic cup: Copa de Nicaragua
- International cup(s): Regional; CONCACAF Central American Cup; Continental; CONCACAF Champions Cup
- Current champions: Diriangén (33rd title) (2024 Clausura)
- Most championships: Diriangén (33 titles)
- Most appearances: Denis Espinoza (433 games)
- Top scorer: Rudel Calero (180 goals)
- Broadcaster: Liga Primera (YouTube)
- Website: www.ligaprimera.com
- Current: 2026–27 Liga Primera

The Liga Primera de Nicaragua is the top division of football in Nicaragua, organized by the Federación Nicaragüense de Fútbol. It was created in 1933.

The league is played in two parts, the Torneo de Apertura from August through November and Torneo de Clausura from January through May. Each of the regular seasons is followed by a playoff of the top four teams over a two-legged semifinal and subsequent final. The relegation end has the bottom team of the aggregate table dropped as well as the defeated one from the playoff match between the 8th and 9th-place teams.

== Current teams ==
=== 2024–25 Primera División ===
Location of 2024–25 teams in Primera División de Nicaragua

| Name | City | Stadium | Capacity |
|---|---|---|---|
| ART Jalapa | Jalapa | Estadio Alejandro Ramos | 1,000 |
| Sport Sébaco | Sébaco | Estadio Carlos Fonseca | 5,000 |
| Deportivo Ocotal | Ocotal | Estadio Roy Fernando Bermúdez | 4,000 |
| Diriangén | Diriamba | Estadio Cacique Diriangén | 8,000 |
| Managua | Managua | Nicaragua National Football Stadium | 20,000 |
| Rancho Santana | Tola | Fun Limon Stadium | 2,000 |
| Matagalpa FC | Matagalpa | Estadio Carlos Fonseca | 5,000 |
| Real Estelí | Estelí | Estadio Independencia | 5,000 |
| UNAN Managua | Managua | Nicaragua National Football Stadium | 20,000 |
| Walter Ferreti | Managua | Nicaragua National Football Stadium | 20,000 |

== List of champions ==
| Ed. | Season | Champion | Champion Coach |
|---|---|---|---|
| 1 | 1933 | Alas | (Nicaragua) Arturo Angarita Núñez |
| 2 | 1934 | Atlético | |
| – | 1935–38 | No tournament | |
| 3 | 1939 | Lido | |
| 4 | 1940 | Diriangén | |
| 5 | 1941 | Diriangén | |
| 6 | 1942 | Diriangén | |
| 7 | 1943 | Diriangén | |
| 8 | 1944 | Diriangén | |
| 9 | 1945 | Diriangén | |
| 10 | 1946 | Ferrocarril | |
| 11 | 1947 | Colegio Centroamérica | |
| 12 | 1948 | Ferrocarril | |
| 13 | 1949 | Diriangén | |
| 14 | 1950 | Aduana | |
| 15 | 1951−52 | Aduana | |
| 16 | 1953 | Diriangén | |
| 17 | 1954 | La Salle | |
| 18 | 1955 | Aduana | |
| 19 | 1956−57 | Diriangén | |
| 20 | 1958 | Atlético | |
| 21 | 1959 | Diriangén | |
| 22 | 1960 | La Nica | (Spain) Antonio Escalante |
| 23 | 1961−62 | Deportivo Santa Cecilia | |
| 24 | 1964−65 | Deportivo Santa Cecilia | |
| 25 | 1966 | Flor de Caña | (Peru) Jorge Dancur |
| 26 | 1967 | Flor de Caña | (Peru) Jorge Dancur |
| 27 | 1968 | UCA | (Argentina) Omar Muraco |
| 28 | 1969 | Diriangén | |
| 29 | 1970 | Diriangén | |
| 30 | 1971 | Deportivo Santa Cecilia | |
| 31 | 1972 | Deportivo Santa Cecilia | |
| 32 | 1973 | Deportivo Santa Cecilia | |
| 33 | 1974 | Diriangén | |
| 34 | 1975 | UCA | (Nicaragua) Armando Arroyo |
| 35 | 1976 | UCA | (Nicaragua) Armando Arroyo |
| 36 | 1977−78 | UCA | (Nicaragua) Armando Arroyo |
| 37 | 1979−80 | Búfalos | |
| 38 | 1981 | Diriangén | |
| 39 | 1982 | Diriangén | |
| 40 | 1983 | Diriangén | |
| 41 | 1984 | Deportivo Masaya | |
| 42 | 1985 | América Managua | (Nicaragua) Florencio Leiva |
| 43 | 1986 | Deportivo Masaya | |
| 44 | 1987 | Diriangén | |
| 45 | 1988 | América Managua | (Nicaragua) Florencio Leiva |
| 46 | 1989 | Diriangén | (Nicaragua) Mauricio Cruz Jiron |
| 47 | 1990 | América Managua | (Nicaragua) Florencio Leiva |
| 48 | 1991 | Real Estelí | (Nicaragua) Leonidas Rodríguez |
| 49 | 1992 | Diriangén | (Nicaragua) Mauricio Cruz Jiron |
| 50 | 1993 | Juventus | (Colombia) Edison Oquendo |
| 51 | 1994 | Juventus | (Colombia) Edison Oquendo |
| 52 | 1994−95 | Diriangén | (Nicaragua) Mauricio Cruz Jiron |
| 53 | 1995−96 | Diriangén | (Nicaragua) Mauricio Cruz Jiron |
| 54 | 1996−97 | Diriangén | (Nicaragua) Mauricio Cruz Jiron |
| 55 | 1997−98 | Walter Ferretti | (El Salvador) Carlos "Chicharrón" Aguilar |
| 56 | 1998−99 | Real Estelí | |
| 57 | 1999−2000 | Diriangén | (Nicaragua) Mauricio Cruz Jiron |
| 58 | 2000−01 | Walter Ferretti | (Nicaragua) Alberto Vásquez |
| 59 | 2001−02 | Deportivo Jalapa | (Nicaragua) Leonidas Rodrigues |
| 60 | 2002−03 | Real Estelí | (Nicaragua) Ramón Otoniel Olivas |
| 61 | 2003 Apertura | Real Estelí | (Nicaragua) Ramón Otoniel Olivas |
| 62 | 2004 Clausura | Real Estelí | (Nicaragua) Ramón Otoniel Olivas |
| 63 | 2004 Apertura | Diriangén | (Nicaragua) Mauricio Cruz Jiron |
| 64 | 2005 Clausura | Diriangén | (Nicaragua) Mauricio Cruz Jiron |
| 65 | 2005−06 | Diriangén | (Nicaragua) Mauricio Cruz Jiron |
| 66 | 2006−07 | Real Estelí | (Nicaragua) Ramón Otoniel Olivas |
| 67 | 2007−08 | Real Estelí | (Nicaragua) Ramón Otoniel Olivas |
| 68 | 2008−09 | Real Estelí | (Nicaragua) Ramón Otoniel Olivas |
| 69 | 2009−10 | Real Estelí | (Nicaragua) Ramón Otoniel Olivas |
| 70 | 2010−11 | Real Estelí | (Nicaragua) Ramón Otoniel Olivas |
| 71 | 2011−12 | Real Estelí | (Nicaragua) Ramón Otoniel Olivas |
| 72 | 2012−13 | Real Estelí | (Nicaragua) Ramón Otoniel Olivas |
| 73 | 2013−14 | Real Estelí | (Nicaragua) Ramón Otoniel Olivas |
| 74 | 2014−15 | Walter Ferretti | (Brazil) Flavio Da Silva |
| 75 | 2015−16 | Real Estelí | (Nicaragua) Ramón Otoniel Olivas |
| 76 | 2016−17 | Real Estelí | (Nicaragua) Ramón Otoniel Olivas |
| 77 | 2017 Apertura | Walter Ferretti | (Brazil) Flavio Da Silva |
| 78 | 2018 Clausura | Diriangén | (Nicaragua) Mauricio Cruz Jiron |
| 79 | 2018 Apertura | Managua | (Nicaragua) Emilio Aburto |
| 80 | 2019 Clausura | Real Estelí | (Nicaragua) Sergio Rodríguez |
| 81 | 2019 Apertura | Real Estelí | (Nicaragua) Holver Flores |
| 82 | 2020 Clausura | Real Estelí | (Nicaragua) Holver Flores |
| 83 | 2020 Apertura | Real Estelí | (Nicaragua) Holver Flores |
| 84 | 2021 Clausura | Diriangén | (Brazil) Flavio Da Silva |
| 85 | 2021 Apertura | Diriangén | (Brazil) Flavio Da Silva |
| 86 | 2022 Clausura | Diriangén | (Nicaragua) Tyrone Leiva |
| 87 | 2022 Apertura | Real Estelí | (Nicaragua) Ramón Otoniel Olivas |
| 88 | 2023 Clausura | Real Estelí | (Nicaragua) Ramón Otoniel Olivas |
| 89 | 2023 Apertura | Diriangén | (Argentina) José Giacone |
| 90 | 2024 Clausura | Diriangén | (Argentina) José Giacone |
| 91 | 2024 Apertura | Diriangén | (Nicaragua) Edward Urroz |
| 92 | 2025 Clausura | Managua | (Nicaragua) Emilio Aburto |
| 93 | 2025 Apertura | Diriangén | (Argentina) José Giacone |
| 94 | 2026 Clausura | Real Estelí | (Argentina) Diego Vásquez |

== Titles by club ==
Teams in bold are currently participating in Primera División de Nicaragua.

| Club | Winners | Winning years |
|---|---|---|
| **Diriangén** | 34 | 1940, 1941, 1942, 1943, 1944, 1945, 1949, 1953, 1956, 1959, 1969, 1970, 1974, 1981, 1982, 1983, 1987, 1989, 1992, 1994−95, 1995−96, 1996−97, 1999−2000, 2004 Apertura, 2005 Clausura, 2005−06, Clausura 2018, 2021 Clausura, 2021 Apertura, Clausura 2022, 2023 Apertura, Clausura 2024, Apertura 2024, 2025 Apertura |
| **Real Estelí** | 22 | 1991, 1998−99, 2002−03, 2003 Apertura, 2004 Clausura, 2006−07, 2007−08, 2008−09, 2009−10, 2010−11, 2011−12, 2012−13, 2013−14, 2015−16, 2016−17, 2019 Clausura, 2019 Apertura, 2020 Clausura, 2020 Apertura, 2022 Apertura, 2023 Clausura, 2026 Clausura |
| Deportivo Santa Cecilia | 5 | 1961, 1965, 1971, 1972, 1973 |
| **Walter Ferretti** | 4 | 1997−98, 2000−01, 2014−15, 2017 Apertura |
| UCA | 4 | 1968, 1975, 1976, 1977 |
| América Managua | 3 | 1985, 1988, 1990 |
| Aduana | 3 | 1950, 1951, 1955 |
| Ferrocarril | 2 | 1946, 1948 |
| Flor de Caña | 2 | 1966, 1967 |
| Deportivo Masaya | 2 | 1984, 1986 |
| Juventus Managua | 2 | 1993, 1994 |
| Atlético | 2 | 1934, 1958 |
| **Managua** | 2 | 2018 Apertura, Clausura 2025 |
| Deportivo Jalapa | 1 | 2001−02 |
| Búfalos | 1 | 1980 |
| La Nica | 1 | 1960 |
| Alas | 1 | 1933 |
| Lido | 1 | 1939 |
| Colegio Centroamérica | 1 | 1947 |
| **UNAN Managua** | 1 | 2015 Apertura |

== Individual statistics ==
=== All-time goalscorer league ===
As of 5 April 2025

| Rank | Country | Player | Goals | Years |
|---|---|---|---|---|
| 1 | (Nicaragua) | Rudel Calero | 180 | 2000–2023 |
| 2 | (Nicaragua) | Luis Galeano | 164 | 2013– |
| 3 | (Nicaragua) | Manuel Cuadra | 142 | 1966–1985 |

Most goals scored by a player in a single season

- 44 goals
  - (Nicaragua) Oscar "Chiqui" Calvo (1967), Flor de Caña.

Most goals scored by a player in a game

- 9 goals
  - (Nicaragua) José María Bermúdez (1999)

The fastest goal league

- 15 seconds
  - Marvin González (San Marcos) against Real Estelí.

=== All-time appearances ===
| Rank | Player | Apps | Years |
| 1 | (Nicaragua) Denis Espinoza | 446 | 2008 |

All-time clean sheets

- 101 clean sheets:
  - Denis Espinoza

=== Multiple hat-tricks ===
| Rank | Country | Player | Hat-tricks |
|---|---|---|---|
| 1 | (Nicaragua) | Luis Galeano | 6 |
| 2 | (Nicaragua) | Herbert Cabrera | 4 |
| 2 | (Nicaragua) | Emilio Palacios | 4 |
| 4 | (Brazil) | Lucas Da Silva | 3 |
| 5 | (Nicaragua) | Arley Bonilla | 2 |
| 5 | (Nicaragua) | Milton Busto | 2 |
| 5 | (Nicaragua) | Daniel Cadena | 2 |
| 5 | (Brazil) | Douglas Caé | 2 |
| 5 | (Nicaragua) | Luis Martinez | 2 |
| 10 | (Nicaragua) | Abner Acuña | 1 |
| 10 | (Nicaragua) | Carlos Alonso | 1 |
| 10 | (Nicaragua) | Rafael Baquedano | 1 |
| 10 | (Colombia) | Marlon Barrios | 1 |
| 10 | (Honduras) | Edwin Castro | 1 |
| 10 | (Nicaragua) | Luis F Coronel | 1 |
| 10 | (Nicaragua) | Norlan Cuadra | 1 |
| 10 | (Nicaragua) | Carlos Chavarría | 1 |
| 10 | (Nicaragua) | Javier Dolmos | 1 |
| 10 | (Nicaragua) | Pablo Gállego | 1 |
| 10 | (Nicaragua) | Emiro Gomes | 1 |
| 10 | (Nicaragua) | Raúl Leguías | 1 |
| 10 | (Nicaragua) | Marlon López | 1 |
| 10 | (Nicaragua) | Ulises Pavon | 1 |
| 10 | (Nicaragua) | Daniel Reyes | 1 |
| 10 | (Cuba) | Maikel Reyes | 1 |
| 10 | (Nicaragua) | Maycon Santana | 1 |
| 10 | (Nicaragua) | Erick Sierra | 1 |
| 10 | (Nicaragua) | Anderson Treminio | 1 |
| 10 | (Nicaragua) | Samuel Wilson | 1 |

== See also ==
- Football in Nicaragua – overview of football sport
- List of attendance at sports leagues
- List of foreign Liga Primera players
