= Keuka (brand) =

Mexican sportswear brand

- Company type: Private
- Industry: Sportswear
- Founded: 2000; 26 years ago
- Headquarters: Celaya, Guanajuato, Mexico
- Products: Sportswear
- Website: www.keuka.com.mx

Keuka is a Mexican brand engaged in the manufacture of sportswear, especially for football equipment.

== Sponsorship ==
Keuka has sponsored several Mexican teams from first, second and third divisions, as well as teams from Chile, Colombia, Costa Rica and also many national teams in its history.

=== National teams ===
- Nicaragua (Until September 2024)

=== Club teams ===
- (Chile) Santiago Morning
- (Colombia) Cortulua
- (Costa Rica) Puntarenas F.C.
- (Mexico) Celaya F.C.
- (Mexico) Cimarrones de Sonora
- (Mexico) Atlético Morelia
- (Mexico) Alacranes de Durango
- (Mexico) Gavilanes de Matamoros
- (Mexico) Querétaro F.C.
- (Panama) Costa del Este F.C. (2015-2017)
- (Panama) CSD San Miguelito (2016-)
- (Panama) Atlético Veragüense (2017-2019)
- (Panama) Sporting San Miguelito (2017-)
