= Copa de Nicaragua =

Nicaraguan association football tournament

- Founded: 1966
- Abolished: 2005
- Region: Nicaragua
- Last champions: Diriangén FC (5th title)
- Most championships: Diriangén FC (5 titles)
- 2025 Copa de Nicaragua

The Copa de Nicaragua was the top knockout tournament in Nicaragua association football and it was held annually. The competition was organized by the Nicaraguan Football Federation from 1966 until 2005.

== Winners ==
- 1966 : ? (Real Estelí were runners-up)
- 1983 : Deportivo Masaya
- 1984 : FC San Marcos
- 1985−1990: not held
- 1991 : Real Estelí
- 1992−1994: not held
- 1995 : FC San Marcos
- 1996 : Diriangén FC (beat Real Estelí)
- 1997 : Diriangén FC (beat Deportivo Walter Ferretti 5–0)
- 1998 : FC San Marcos
- 1999 : FC San Marcos
- 2005 : Deportivo Masatepe (beat América Managua 2–0)

=== Copa Primera ===
In 2019 the Liga Nicaragua organised a domestic League Cup with only the clubs of the league eligible to enter the tournament.

- 2019 : Managua F.C. 0−0 (a.e.t.) 4–3 (pen.) Diriangén FC
- 2020 : Diriangén FC 1−0 Managua F.C.
- 2021 : Deportivo Walter Ferretti 3−1 Real Madriz FC
- 2022 : Deportivo Walter Ferretti 1−0 Real Estelí
- 2023 : Real Estelí 3−0 Ocotal
- 2024 : Diriangén FC 3−2 Matagalpa
- 2025 : Diriangén FC 2−1 Real Estelí
