= 2017 CONCACAF Gold Cup squads =

List of soccer teams

The twelve national teams involved in the 2017 CONCACAF Gold Cup were required to register a squad of 23 players; only players in these squads were eligible to take part in the tournament.

A provisional list of forty players per national team was submitted to CONCACAF by 2 June 2017. The final list of 23 players per national team was submitted to CONCACAF by 27 June 2017. Three players per national team had to be goalkeepers.

National teams that reached the knockout stage were able to swap up to six players in the final squad with six players from the provisional list within 24 hours of their final group stage game.

The statistics in the tables below represent player profiles as of the beginning of the tournament. See individual player articles for current statistics. The club listed is the club for which the player last played a competitive match prior to the tournament. The nationality for each club reflects the national association (not the league) to which the club is affiliated.

== Group A ==
=== Canada ===
Head coach: (Ecuador) Octavio Zambrano

No.	Pos.	Player	Date of birth (age)	Caps	Goals	Club
1	GK	Maxime Crépeau	11 April 1994 (aged 23)	1	0	(Canadian Soccer Association) Montreal Impact
2	DF	Fraser Aird	2 February 1995 (aged 22)	6	1	(Scottish Football Association) Falkirk
3	DF	Manjrekar James	5 August 1993 (aged 23)	11	2	(Hungarian Football Federation) Vasas
4	DF	Sam Adekugbe	16 January 1995 (aged 22)	3	0	(Canadian Soccer Association) Vancouver Whitecaps FC
5	DF	Dejan Jakovic	16 July 1985 (aged 31)	35	0	(United States Soccer Federation) New York Cosmos
6	MF	Samuel Piette	12 November 1994 (aged 22)	31	0	(Royal Spanish Football Federation) Izarra
7	MF	Russell Teibert	22 December 1992 (aged 24)	18	1	(Canadian Soccer Association) Vancouver Whitecaps FC
8	MF	Scott Arfield	1 November 1988 (aged 28)	7	0	(The Football Association) Burnley
9	FW	Lucas Cavallini	28 December 1992 (aged 24)	3	0	(Uruguayan Football Association) Peñarol
10	MF	Junior Hoilett	5 June 1990 (aged 27)	12	0	(Football Association of Wales) Cardiff City
11	FW	Tosaint Ricketts	6 August 1987 (aged 29)	55	15	(Canadian Soccer Association) Toronto FC
12	MF	Alphonso Davies	2 November 2000 (aged 16)	1	0	(Canadian Soccer Association) Vancouver Whitecaps FC
13	MF	Raheem Edwards (substituted off) (Note: Edwards was replaced following the group stage.)	17 July 1995 (aged 21)	1	0	(Canadian Soccer Association) Toronto FC
14	MF	Mark-Anthony Kaye	2 December 1994 (aged 22)	1	0	(United States Soccer Federation) Louisville City
15	DF	Adam Straith	11 September 1990 (aged 26)	43	0	(Canadian Soccer Association) FC Edmonton
16	FW	Anthony Jackson-Hamel	3 August 1993 (aged 23)	4	2	(Canadian Soccer Association) Montreal Impact
17	DF	Marcel de Jong	15 October 1986 (aged 30)	51	3	(Canadian Soccer Association) Vancouver Whitecaps FC
18	GK	Milan Borjan	23 October 1987 (aged 29)	33	0	(Bulgarian Football Union) Ludogorets Razgrad
19	DF	Steven Vitória	11 January 1987 (aged 30)	5	1	(Polish Football Association) Lechia Gdańsk
20	MF	Patrice Bernier (captain)	23 September 1979 (aged 37)	54	2	(Canadian Soccer Association) Montreal Impact
21	MF	Jonathan Osorio	12 June 1992 (aged 25)	16	1	(Canadian Soccer Association) Toronto FC
22	GK	Jayson Leutwiler	25 April 1989 (aged 28)	2	0	(The Football Association) Shrewsbury Town
23	MF	Michael Petrasso	9 July 1995 (aged 21)	2	0	(The Football Association) Queens Park Rangers
24	FW	Cyle Larin (substituted on) (Note: Larin was introduced as an alternate player following the group stage.)	17 April 1995 (aged 22)	20	5	(United States Soccer Federation) Orlando City SC

=== Costa Rica ===
Head coach: Óscar Ramírez

Rónald Matarrita withdrew from the squad due to injury and was replaced by Juan Pablo Vargas.

No.	Pos.	Player	Date of birth (age)	Caps	Goals	Club
1	GK	Leonel Moreira	4 April 1990 (aged 27)	6	0	(Costa Rican Football Federation) Herediano
2	DF	Jhonny Acosta	21 July 1983 (aged 33)	56	2	(Costa Rican Football Federation) Herediano
3	DF	Giancarlo González	8 February 1988 (aged 29)	56	2	(Italian Football Federation) Bologna
4	DF	Michael Umaña	16 July 1982 (aged 34)	98	1	(Costa Rican Football Federation) Cartaginés
5	DF	Kenner Gutiérrez	9 June 1989 (aged 28)	2	0	(Costa Rican Football Federation) Alajuelense
6	DF	José Salvatierra	10 October 1989 (aged 27)	30	0	(Costa Rican Football Federation) Alajuelense
7	FW	David Ramírez	28 May 1993 (aged 24)	12	3	(Costa Rican Football Federation) Saprissa
8	DF	Bryan Oviedo (substituted off) (Note: Oviedo was replaced following the group stage.)	18 February 1990 (aged 27)	33	1	(The Football Association) Sunderland
9	FW	Ariel Rodríguez	27 September 1989 (aged 27)	10	1	(Football Association of Thailand) Bangkok Glass
10	FW	Bryan Ruiz (captain)	18 August 1985 (aged 31)	97	22	(Portuguese Football Federation) Sporting CP
11	MF	Johan Venegas (substituted off) (Note: Venegas was replaced following the group stage.)	27 November 1988 (aged 28)	36	8	(United States Soccer Federation) Minnesota United FC
12	FW	Joel Campbell (substituted off) (Note: Campbell was replaced following the group stage.)	26 June 1992 (aged 25)	71	14	(The Football Association) Arsenal
13	MF	Rodney Wallace	17 June 1988 (aged 29)	19	3	(United States Soccer Federation) New York City FC
14	MF	Randall Azofeifa	30 December 1984 (aged 32)	55	3	(Costa Rican Football Federation) Herediano
15	DF	Francisco Calvo	8 July 1992 (aged 24)	22	1	(United States Soccer Federation) Minnesota United FC
16	DF	Cristian Gamboa (substituted off) (Note: Gamboa was replaced following the group stage.)	24 October 1989 (aged 27)	54	3	(Scottish Football Association) Celtic
17	MF	Yeltsin Tejeda	17 March 1992 (aged 25)	39	0	(Swiss Football Association) Lausanne
18	GK	Patrick Pemberton	24 April 1982 (aged 35)	33	0	(Costa Rican Football Federation) Alajuelense
19	MF	Ulises Segura	23 June 1993 (aged 24)	3	0	(Costa Rican Football Federation) Saprissa
20	MF	David Guzmán	18 February 1990 (aged 27)	32	0	(United States Soccer Federation) Portland Timbers
21	FW	Marco Ureña	5 March 1990 (aged 27)	48	10	(United States Soccer Federation) San Jose Earthquakes
22	DF	Juan Pablo Vargas	15 June 1995 (aged 22)	1	0	(Costa Rican Football Federation) Herediano
23	GK	Danny Carvajal	8 January 1989 (aged 28)	2	0	(Royal Spanish Football Federation) Albacete
24	DF	Kendall Waston (substituted on) (Note: Waston was introduced as an alternate player following the group stage.)	1 January 1988 (aged 29)	16	1	(Canadian Soccer Association) Vancouver Whitecaps FC
25	FW	José Leitón (substituted on) (Note: Leitón was introduced as an alternate player following the group stage.)	6 August 1993 (aged 23)	0	0	(Costa Rican Football Federation) Herediano
26	DF	Jhamir Ordain (substituted on) (Note: Ordain was introduced as an alternate player following the group stage.)	29 July 1993 (aged 23)	2	0	(Costa Rican Football Federation) Herediano
27	MF	Jimmy Marín (substituted on) (Note: Marín was introduced as an alternate player following the group stage.)	8 October 1997 (aged 19)	0	0	(Costa Rican Football Federation) Herediano

=== French Guiana ===
Head coach: (France) Marie-Rose Carême & Jaïr Karam

Florent Malouda was considered ineligible by CONCACAF.

No.	Pos.	Player	Date of birth (age)	Caps	Goals	Club
1	GK	Simon Lugier	2 August 1989 (aged 27)	0	0	(French Football Federation) Saint-Malo
2	DF	Hugues Rosimé	5 September 1984 (aged 32)	0	0	(Ligue de football de la Guyane) Matoury
3	DF	Marvin Torvic	5 January 1988 (aged 29)	26	1	(Italian Football Federation) Campobasso
4	FW	Rhudy Evens	13 February 1988 (aged 29)	38	5	(Ligue de football de la Guyane) Matoury
5	MF	Cédric Fabien	31 January 1982 (aged 35)	2	0	(French Football Federation) Tarbes
6	DF	Kévin Rimane	23 February 1991 (aged 26)	14	1	(French Football Federation) Paris Saint-Germain B
7	DF	Anthony Soubervie	24 April 1984 (aged 33)	9	1	(French Football Federation) Chambly
8	DF	Jean-David Legrand	23 February 1991 (aged 26)	12	1	(French Football Federation) Stade Bordelais
9	FW	Arnold Abelinti	9 September 1991 (aged 25)	3	2	(French Football Federation) Drancy
10	MF	Loïc Baal	28 January 1992 (aged 25)	8	0	(French Football Federation) Belfort
11	FW	Roy Contout	11 February 1985 (aged 32)	12	2	(Royal Moroccan Football Federation) RS Berkane
12	FW	Mickaël Solvi	11 January 1987 (aged 30)	13	3	(Ligue de football de la Guyane) Matoury
13	MF	Miguel Haabo	1 September 1990 (aged 26)	9	1	(Ligue de football de la Guyane) Étoile Matoury
14	DF	Grégory Lescot	10 May 1989 (aged 28)	10	0	(French Football Federation) Chartres
15	MF	Florent Malouda	13 June 1980 (aged 37)	2	0	(All India Football Federation) Delhi Dynamos
16	GK	Jean-Banuel Petit-Homme	15 August 1990 (aged 26)	0	0	(Ligue de football de la Guyane) Matoury
17	DF	Inrick Baal	10 February 1992 (aged 25)	3	0	(Ligue de football de la Guyane) Cayenne
18	FW	Sloan Privat	24 July 1989 (aged 27)	3	6	(French Football Federation) Guingamp
19	FW	Jules Haabo	3 September 1993 (aged 23)	1	0	(Ligue de football de la Guyane) Étoile Matoury
20	MF	Marc Edwige	26 September 1986 (aged 30)	18	1	(Ligue de football de la Guyane) Cayenne
21	FW	Shaquille Dutard	21 September 1996 (aged 20)	3	1	(French Football Federation) Tarbes
22	GK	Donovan Léon (captain)	3 November 1992 (aged 24)	10	0	(French Football Federation) Brest
23	MF	Ludovic Baal	24 May 1986 (aged 31)	10	3	(French Football Federation) Rennes

=== Honduras ===
Head coach: (Colombia) Jorge Luis Pinto

Anthony Lozano and Rony Martínez, although included in the 23-man squad list presented to CONCACAF, did not travel with the squad due to injury.

No.	Pos.	Player	Date of birth (age)	Caps	Goals	Club
1	GK	Luis López	13 September 1993 (aged 23)	6	0	(National Autonomous Federation of Football of Honduras) Real España
2	DF	Félix Crisanto	9 September 1990 (aged 26)	5	0	(National Autonomous Federation of Football of Honduras) Motagua
3	DF	Maynor Figueroa (captain)	2 May 1983 (aged 34)	136	4	(United States Soccer Federation) FC Dallas
4	DF	Henry Figueroa	28 December 1992 (aged 24)	26	0	(National Autonomous Federation of Football of Honduras) Motagua
5	DF	Ever Alvarado	30 November 1992 (aged 24)	14	1	(National Autonomous Federation of Football of Honduras) Olimpia
6	MF	Bryan Acosta	24 November 1993 (aged 23)	34	3	(National Autonomous Federation of Football of Honduras) Real España
7	MF	Carlos Discua	20 September 1984 (aged 32)	29	2	(National Autonomous Federation of Football of Honduras) Motagua
8	MF	Alfredo Mejía	3 April 1990 (aged 27)	32	1	(Hellenic Football Federation) Xanthi FC
9	FW	Anthony Lozano (substituted off) (Note: Lozano was replaced following the group stage.)	25 April 1993 (aged 24)	22	7	(Royal Spanish Football Federation) Tenerife
10	MF	Alexander López	5 June 1992 (aged 25)	9	0	(National Autonomous Federation of Football of Honduras) Olimpia
11	MF	Rony Martínez (substituted off) (Note: Martínez was replaced following the group stage.)	16 August 1988 (aged 28)	15	2	(Chinese Football Association) Baoding Yingli ETS
12	FW	Romell Quioto	9 August 1991 (aged 25)	28	4	(United States Soccer Federation) Houston Dynamo
13	MF	Sergio Peña	9 May 1987 (aged 30)	0	0	(National Autonomous Federation of Football of Honduras) CD Real Sociedad
14	MF	Boniek García	4 September 1984 (aged 32)	117	3	(United States Soccer Federation) Houston Dynamo
15	DF	Allans Vargas	25 September 1993 (aged 23)	7	0	(National Autonomous Federation of Football of Honduras) Real España
16	FW	Carlos Lanza	15 May 1989 (aged 28)	0	0	(National Autonomous Federation of Football of Honduras) Juticalpa
17	FW	Alberth Elis	12 February 1996 (aged 21)	17	3	(United States Soccer Federation) Houston Dynamo
18	GK	Ricardo Canales	30 May 1982 (aged 35)	6	0	(National Autonomous Federation of Football of Honduras) Vida
19	DF	Marcelo Pereira	27 May 1995 (aged 22)	6	0	(National Autonomous Federation of Football of Honduras) Motagua
20	MF	Jorge Claros	8 January 1986 (aged 31)	77	3	(National Autonomous Federation of Football of Honduras) Real España
21	DF	Brayan Beckeles	28 November 1985 (aged 31)	50	1	(Mexican Football Federation) Necaxa
22	GK	Donis Escober	3 February 1981 (aged 36)	57	0	(National Autonomous Federation of Football of Honduras) Olimpia
23	DF	Carlos Sánchez	22 August 1990 (aged 26)	1	0	(National Autonomous Federation of Football of Honduras) Honduras Progreso
24	MF	Michaell Chirinos (substituted on) (Note: Chirinos was introduced as an alternate player following the group stage.)	17 June 1995 (aged 22)	9	0	(National Autonomous Federation of Football of Honduras) Olimpia
25	FW	Ángel Tejeda (substituted on) (Note: Tejeda was introduced as an alternate player following the group stage.)	1 June 1991 (aged 26)	11	0	(National Autonomous Federation of Football of Honduras) Real España

== Group B ==
=== Martinique ===
Head coach: (France) Jean-Marc Civault

No.	Pos.	Player	Date of birth (age)	Caps	Goals	Club
1	GK	Emmanuel Vermignon	20 January 1989 (aged 28)	17	0	(Ligue de football de la Martinique) Club Colonial
2	DF	Nicolas Zaïre	7 December 1986 (aged 30)	39	2	(Ligue de football de la Martinique) Club Franciscain
3	DF	Antoine Jean-Baptiste	20 January 1991 (aged 26)	11	1	(French Football Federation) Villefranche
4	DF	Florian Narcissot	20 May 1991 (aged 26)	1	0	(Ligue de football de la Martinique) Club Franciscain
5	DF	Karl Vitulin	15 January 1991 (aged 26)	34	2	(Ligue de football de la Martinique) Samaritaine
6	MF	Djénhael Maingé	18 February 1992 (aged 25)	18	3	(Ligue de football de la Martinique) Club Franciscain
7	FW	Grégory Pastel	18 September 1990 (aged 26)	12	3	(Ligue de football de la Martinique) Rivière-Pilote
8	DF	Jordy Delem	18 March 1993 (aged 24)	32	5	(United States Soccer Federation) Seattle Sounders FC
9	FW	Anthony Angély	21 March 1990 (aged 27)	18	2	(French Football Federation) Châteaubriant
10	FW	Steeven Langil	4 March 1988 (aged 29)	6	4	(Polish Football Association) Legia Warsaw
11	FW	Johan Audel	12 December 1983 (aged 33)	2	1	(Israel Football Association) Beitar Jerusalem
12	FW	Yoann Arquin	15 April 1988 (aged 29)	13	3	(The Football Association) Mansfield Town
13	MF	Christophe Jougon	10 July 1995 (aged 21)	11	0	(Ligue de football de la Martinique) Club Franciscain
14	MF	Yann Thimon	1 January 1990 (aged 27)	3	1	(Ligue de football de la Martinique) Golden Lion
15	DF	Gérald Dondon	4 October 1986 (aged 30)	15	2	(Ligue de football de la Martinique) Club Colonial
16	GK	Loïc Chauvet	30 April 1988 (aged 29)	9	0	(Ligue de football de la Martinique) Case-Pilote
17	FW	Kévin Parsemain	13 February 1988 (aged 29)	41	27	(Ligue de football de la Martinique) Golden Lion
18	MF	Jean-Emmanuel Nédra	11 March 1993 (aged 24)	15	0	(Ligue de football de la Martinique) Aiglon
19	MF	Daniel Hérelle	17 October 1988 (aged 28)	60	2	(Ligue de football de la Martinique) Golden Lion
20	MF	Stéphane Abaul	23 November 1991 (aged 25)	37	7	(Ligue de football de la Martinique) Club Franciscain
21	DF	Sébastien Crétinoir (captain)	12 February 1986 (aged 31)	46	2	(Ligue de football de la Martinique) Golden Lion
22	FW	Johnny Marajo	21 October 1993 (aged 23)	5	0	(Ligue de football de la Martinique) Club Franciscain
23	GK	Kévin Olimpa	10 March 1988 (aged 29)	13	0	Unattached

=== Nicaragua ===
Head coach: (Costa Rica) Henry Duarte

No.	Pos.	Player	Date of birth (age)	Caps	Goals	Club
1	GK	Justo Lorente	27 February 1984 (aged 33)	19	0	(Nicaraguan Football Federation) Real Estelí
2	DF	Josué Quijano	10 March 1991 (aged 26)	45	1	(Nicaraguan Football Federation) Real Estelí
3	DF	Manuel Rosas	14 October 1983 (aged 33)	31	2	(Nicaraguan Football Federation) Real Estelí
4	DF	Henry Niño	3 October 1997 (aged 19)	0	0	(Nicaraguan Football Federation) Diriangén
5	DF	Erick Téllez	28 January 1989 (aged 28)	24	0	(Nicaraguan Football Federation) Diriangén
6	DF	Luis Copete	12 February 1989 (aged 28)	25	3	(Peruvian Football Federation) Comerciantes Unidos
7	FW	Carlos Chavarría	2 May 1994 (aged 23)	22	5	(Nicaraguan Football Federation) Real Estelí
8	MF	Marlon López	2 November 1992 (aged 24)	26	0	(Nicaraguan Football Federation) Real Estelí
9	MF	Daniel Cadena	9 February 1987 (aged 30)	19	3	(Football Association of Iceland) Njarðvík
10	MF	Luis Galeano	15 October 1991 (aged 25)	14	3	(Nicaraguan Football Federation) Real Estelí
11	FW	Juan Barrera (captain)	2 May 1989 (aged 28)	42	10	(National Football Federation of Guatemala) Comunicaciones
12	GK	Diedrich Téllez	31 October 1984 (aged 32)	14	0	(Nicaraguan Football Federation) Juventus Managua
13	MF	Bryan García	25 May 1995 (aged 22)	19	3	(Nicaraguan Football Federation) Real Estelí
14	FW	Eulises Pavón	6 January 1993 (aged 24)	18	2	(National Football Federation of Guatemala) Suchitepéquez
15	MF	Bismarck Montiel	5 March 1995 (aged 22)	5	0	(Nicaraguan Football Federation) Managua
16	MF	Elvis Pinel	18 December 1988 (aged 28)	29	1	(Nicaraguan Football Federation) Real Estelí
17	DF	Bismarck Veliz	10 September 1993 (aged 23)	10	0	(Nicaraguan Football Federation) Chinandega
18	MF	Maykel Montiel	27 January 1990 (aged 27)	8	0	(Nicaraguan Football Federation) UNAN Managua
19	MF	Luis Peralta	12 October 1988 (aged 28)	18	1	(Nicaraguan Football Federation) Walter Ferretti
20	DF	Oscar López	27 February 1992 (aged 25)	8	0	(Nicaraguan Football Federation) Managua
21	FW	Jorge García	27 August 1998 (aged 18)	5	1	(Nicaraguan Football Federation) Walter Ferretti
22	DF	Cyril Errington	30 March 1992 (aged 25)	7	0	(Nicaraguan Football Federation) Real Estelí
23	GK	Henry Maradiaga	5 February 1990 (aged 27)	0	0	(Nicaraguan Football Federation) Real Estelí

=== Panama ===
Head coach: (Colombia) Hernán Darío Gómez

No.	Pos.	Player	Date of birth (age)	Caps	Goals	Club
1	GK	Álex Rodríguez	8 May 1990 (aged 27)	5	0	(Panamanian Football Federation) San Francisco
2	DF	Michael Amir Murillo	11 February 1996 (aged 21)	10	1	(United States Soccer Federation) New York Red Bulls
3	DF	Ángel Patrick	27 February 1992 (aged 25)	5	0	(Mexican Football Federation) Tapachula
4	DF	Jan Carlos Vargas	13 March 1995 (aged 22)	4	0	(Panamanian Football Federation) Tauro
5	DF	Fidel Escobar	9 January 1995 (aged 22)	10	1	(Panamanian Football Federation) Sporting San Miguelito
6	MF	Gabriel Gómez (captain)	29 May 1984 (aged 33)	131	12	(Colombian Football Federation) Atlético Bucaramanga
7	FW	Ricardo Clarke	27 September 1992 (aged 24)	2	0	(Portuguese Football Federation) Boavista
8	MF	Yoel Bárcenas	23 October 1993 (aged 23)	17	0	(Mexican Football Federation) Tapachula
9	FW	Gabriel Torres	31 October 1988 (aged 28)	59	10	(Swiss Football Association) Lausanne
10	FW	Ismael Díaz	12 May 1997 (aged 20)	4	1	(Portuguese Football Federation) Porto B
11	MF	Armando Cooper	26 November 1987 (aged 29)	85	6	(Canadian Soccer Association) Toronto FC
12	GK	José Calderón	14 August 1985 (aged 31)	23	0	(Colombian Football Federation) Real Cartagena
13	DF	Roderick Miller	4 March 1992 (aged 25)	21	0	(Colombian Football Federation) Atlético Nacional
14	MF	Valentín Pimentel	30 May 1991 (aged 26)	18	1	(Panamanian Football Federation) Plaza Amador
15	DF	Erick Davis	31 March 1991 (aged 26)	32	0	(Slovak Football Association) Dunajská Streda
16	GK	Orlando Mosquera	25 December 1994 (aged 22)	0	0	(Panamanian Football Federation) Tauro
17	DF	Luis Ovalle	7 September 1988 (aged 28)	15	0	(Venezuelan Football Federation) Zamora
18	MF	Miguel Camargo	9 May 1993 (aged 24)	13	1	(United States Soccer Federation) New York City FC
19	MF	Josiel Núñez	29 January 1993 (aged 24)	9	1	(Panamanian Football Federation) Plaza Amador
20	MF	Aníbal Godoy	10 February 1990 (aged 27)	75	1	(United States Soccer Federation) San Jose Earthquakes
21	MF	Leslie Heráldez	30 March 1993 (aged 24)	0	0	(Panamanian Football Federation) Árabe Unido
22	FW	Abdiel Arroyo	13 December 1993 (aged 23)	26	3	(Uruguayan Football Association) Danubio
23	DF	Roberto Chen	24 May 1994 (aged 23)	17	1	(Panamanian Football Federation) Árabe Unido

=== United States ===
Head coach: Bruce Arena

Kenny Saief withdrew from the squad due to injury and was replaced by Chris Pontius.

No.	Pos.	Player	Date of birth (age)	Caps	Goals	Club
1	GK	Brad Guzan (substituted off) (Note: Guzan was replaced following the group stage.)	9 September 1984 (aged 32)	55	0	(United States Soccer Federation) Atlanta United FC
2	DF	Jorge Villafaña	16 September 1989 (aged 27)	7	0	(Mexican Football Federation) Santos Laguna
3	DF	Omar Gonzalez	11 October 1988 (aged 28)	40	1	(Mexican Football Federation) Pachuca
4	DF	Matt Miazga	19 July 1995 (aged 21)	2	0	(The Football Association) Chelsea
5	DF	Matt Besler	11 February 1987 (aged 30)	40	1	(United States Soccer Federation) Sporting Kansas City
6	MF	Kelyn Rowe (substituted off) (Note: Rowe was replaced following the group stage.)	2 December 1991 (aged 25)	1	0	(United States Soccer Federation) New England Revolution
7	MF	Chris Pontius	12 May 1987 (aged 30)	2	0	(United States Soccer Federation) Philadelphia Union
8	MF	Jordan Morris	26 October 1994 (aged 22)	16	2	(United States Soccer Federation) Seattle Sounders FC
9	FW	Gyasi Zardes	2 September 1991 (aged 25)	32	6	(United States Soccer Federation) LA Galaxy
10	MF	Joe Corona	9 July 1990 (aged 26)	18	2	(Mexican Football Federation) Tijuana
11	MF	Alejandro Bedoya (substituted off) (Note: Bedoya was replaced following the group stage.)	29 April 1987 (aged 30)	61	2	(United States Soccer Federation) Philadelphia Union
12	GK	Bill Hamid	25 November 1990 (aged 26)	2	0	(United States Soccer Federation) D.C. United
13	MF	Dax McCarty	20 April 1987 (aged 30)	7	0	(United States Soccer Federation) Chicago Fire
14	FW	Dom Dwyer (substituted off) (Note: Dwyer was replaced following the group stage.)	30 July 1990 (aged 26)	1	1	(United States Soccer Federation) Sporting Kansas City
15	DF	Eric Lichaj	17 November 1988 (aged 28)	11	0	(The Football Association) Nottingham Forest
16	DF	Justin Morrow	4 October 1987 (aged 29)	1	0	(Canadian Soccer Association) Toronto FC
17	MF	Cristian Roldan (substituted off) (Note: Roldan was replaced following the group stage.)	3 June 1995 (aged 22)	0	0	(United States Soccer Federation) Seattle Sounders FC
18	FW	Juan Agudelo	23 November 1992 (aged 24)	23	3	(United States Soccer Federation) New England Revolution
19	DF	Graham Zusi	18 August 1986 (aged 30)	49	5	(United States Soccer Federation) Sporting Kansas City
20	MF	Paul Arriola	5 February 1995 (aged 22)	6	2	(Mexican Football Federation) Tijuana
21	DF	Matt Hedges	1 April 1990 (aged 27)	3	0	(United States Soccer Federation) FC Dallas
22	GK	Sean Johnson (substituted off) (Note: Johnson was replaced following the group stage.)	31 May 1989 (aged 28)	5	0	(United States Soccer Federation) New York City FC
23	MF	Kellyn Acosta	24 July 1995 (aged 21)	9	1	(United States Soccer Federation) FC Dallas
24	GK	Tim Howard (substituted on) (Note: Howard was introduced as an alternate player following the group stage.)	6 March 1979 (aged 38)	115	0	(United States Soccer Federation) Colorado Rapids
25	MF	Darlington Nagbe (substituted on) (Note: Nagbe was introduced as an alternate player following the group stage.)	19 July 1990 (aged 26)	17	1	(United States Soccer Federation) Portland Timbers
26	MF	Michael Bradley (substituted on) (Note: Bradley was introduced as an alternate player following the group stage.) (captain)	31 July 1987 (aged 29)	133	17	(Canadian Soccer Association) Toronto FC
27	FW	Jozy Altidore (substituted on) (Note: Altidore was introduced as an alternate player following the group stage.)	6 November 1989 (aged 27)	104	37	(Canadian Soccer Association) Toronto FC
28	FW	Clint Dempsey (substituted on) (Note: Dempsey was introduced as an alternate player following the group stage.)	9 March 1983 (aged 34)	134	56	(United States Soccer Federation) Seattle Sounders FC
29	GK	Jesse González (substituted on) (Note: González was introduced as an alternate player following the group stage.)	25 May 1995 (aged 22)	0	0	(United States Soccer Federation) FC Dallas

== Group C ==
=== Curaçao ===
Head coach: (Netherlands) Remko Bicentini

No.	Pos.	Player	Date of birth (age)	Caps	Goals	Club
1	GK	Eloy Room	6 February 1989 (aged 28)	12	0	(Royal Dutch Football Association) Vitesse
2	DF	Dustley Mulder	27 January 1985 (aged 32)	12	0	(Royal Dutch Football Association) NAC Breda
3	DF	Cuco Martina (captain)	25 September 1989 (aged 27)	24	0	(The Football Association) Southampton
4	DF	Darryl Lachman	11 November 1989 (aged 27)	10	1	(Royal Dutch Football Association) Willem II
5	DF	Quentin Jakoba	19 December 1987 (aged 29)	2	0	(Royal Dutch Football Association) Kozakken Boys
6	MF	Quenten Martinus	7 March 1991 (aged 26)	3	0	(Japan Football Association) Yokohama F. Marinos
7	MF	Leandro Bacuna	21 August 1991 (aged 25)	6	4	(The Football Association) Aston Villa
8	MF	Jarchinio Antonia	27 December 1990 (aged 26)	10	0	(Royal Dutch Football Association) Go Ahead Eagles
9	FW	Gino van Kessel	9 March 1993 (aged 24)	10	7	(Football Association of the Czech Republic) Slavia Prague
10	MF	Kemy Agustien	20 August 1986 (aged 30)	10	0	(Philippine Football Federation) Global Cebu
11	MF	Gevaro Nepomuceno	10 November 1992 (aged 24)	26	4	(Portuguese Football Federation) Marítimo
12	DF	Shanon Carmelia	20 March 1989 (aged 28)	26	2	(Royal Dutch Football Association) IJsselmeervogels
13	DF	Juriën Gaari	23 December 1993 (aged 23)	2	0	(Royal Dutch Football Association) Kozakken Boys
14	MF	Ashar Bernardus	21 December 1985 (aged 31)	13	0	(Curaçao Football Federation) Centro Dominguito
15	DF	Doriano Kortstam	7 July 1994 (aged 23)	1	0	(Royal Dutch Football Association) Achilles '29
16	MF	Michaël Maria	31 January 1995 (aged 22)	8	0	(German Football Association) Erzgebirge Aue
17	DF	Gillian Justiana	5 March 1991 (aged 26)	9	0	(Royal Dutch Football Association) Helmond Sport
18	FW	Elson Hooi	1 October 1991 (aged 25)	7	2	(Danish Football Association) Vendsyssel FF
19	FW	Rangelo Janga	16 April 1992 (aged 25)	3	2	(Slovak Football Association) Trenčín
20	FW	Felitciano Zschusschen	24 January 1992 (aged 25)	9	8	(German Football Association) 1. FC Saarbrücken
21	DF	Ayrton Statie	22 July 1994 (aged 22)	5	0	(Royal Dutch Football Association) Oss
22	GK	Jarzinho Pieter	11 November 1987 (aged 29)	12	0	(Curaçao Football Federation) Centro Dominguito
23	GK	Rowendy Sumter	19 March 1988 (aged 29)	7	0	(Curaçao Football Federation) Scherpenheuvel

=== El Salvador ===
Head coach: (Colombia) Eduardo Lara

Irvin Herrera withdrew from the squad due to injury and was replaced by Edwin Sánchez.

No.	Pos.	Player	Date of birth (age)	Caps	Goals	Club
1	GK	Óscar Arroyo	28 January 1990 (aged 27)	5	0	(Salvadoran Football Federation) Alianza
2	DF	Milton Molina	2 February 1989 (aged 28)	28	0	(Salvadoran Football Federation) Isidro Metapán
3	DF	Roberto Domínguez	9 May 1997 (aged 20)	10	0	(Salvadoran Football Federation) Santa Tecla
4	DF	Henry Romero	17 September 1991 (aged 25)	19	1	(Salvadoran Football Federation) Alianza
5	DF	Iván Mancía	1 May 1989 (aged 28)	6	0	(Salvadoran Football Federation) Alianza
6	MF	Richard Menjívar	31 October 1990 (aged 26)	36	1	(United States Soccer Federation) New York Cosmos
7	MF	Darwin Cerén	31 December 1989 (aged 27)	41	2	(United States Soccer Federation) San Jose Earthquakes
8	MF	Denis Pineda	10 August 1995 (aged 21)	11	1	(Portuguese Football Federation) Santa Clara
9	FW	Nelson Bonilla	11 September 1990 (aged 26)	33	10	(Turkish Football Federation) Gazişehir Gaziantep
10	MF	Gerson Mayen	9 February 1989 (aged 28)	23	1	(Salvadoran Football Federation) Santa Tecla
11	FW	Rodolfo Zelaya	3 July 1988 (aged 29)	41	19	(Salvadoran Football Federation) Alianza
12	MF	Narciso Orellana	28 January 1995 (aged 22)	9	0	(Salvadoran Football Federation) Alianza
13	DF	Alexander Larín	27 June 1992 (aged 25)	44	4	(Mexican Football Federation) Juárez
14	MF	Andrés Flores (captain)	31 August 1990 (aged 26)	57	0	(United States Soccer Federation) New York Cosmos
15	MF	Junior Burgos	14 August 1988 (aged 28)	7	1	(United States Soccer Federation) Reno 1868
16	MF	Óscar Cerén	26 October 1991 (aged 25)	15	1	(Salvadoran Football Federation) Alianza
17	MF	Victor García	15 June 1995 (aged 22)	1	0	(Salvadoran Football Federation) Águila
18	GK	Derby Carrillo	19 September 1987 (aged 29)	14	0	(Football Association of Iceland) ÍBV
19	FW	Edwin Sánchez	21 February 1990 (aged 27)	16	2	(Salvadoran Football Federation) Águila
20	FW	Harold Alas	19 September 1989 (aged 27)	1	0	(Salvadoran Football Federation) Santa Tecla
21	DF	Bryan Tamacas	21 February 1995 (aged 22)	9	0	(Salvadoran Football Federation) Santa Tecla
22	GK	Benji Villalobos	15 July 1988 (aged 28)	13	0	(Salvadoran Football Federation) Águila
23	DF	Rubén Marroquín	10 May 1992 (aged 25)	0	0	(Salvadoran Football Federation) Alianza

=== Jamaica ===
Head coach: Theodore Whitmore

Dever Orgill withdrew from the squad due to injury and was replaced by Shaun Francis.

No.	Pos.	Player	Date of birth (age)	Caps	Goals	Club
1	GK	Andre Blake (captain)	21 November 1990 (aged 26)	23	0	(United States Soccer Federation) Philadelphia Union
2	DF	Rosario Harriott	26 September 1989 (aged 27)	6	0	(Jamaica Football Federation) Harbour View
3	DF	Damion Lowe	5 May 1993 (aged 24)	4	1	(United States Soccer Federation) Tampa Bay Rowdies
4	DF	Ladale Richie	31 May 1988 (aged 29)	3	0	(Jamaica Football Federation) Montego Bay United
5	DF	Alvas Powell	18 July 1994 (aged 22)	27	2	(United States Soccer Federation) Portland Timbers
6	DF	Sergio Campbell	16 January 1992 (aged 25)	3	0	(United States Soccer Federation) Pittsburgh Riverhounds
7	FW	Shaun Francis	2 October 1986 (aged 30)	10	2	(United States Soccer Federation) San Jose Earthquakes
8	DF	Oniel Fisher	22 November 1991 (aged 25)	5	0	(United States Soccer Federation) Seattle Sounders FC
9	MF	Ewan Grandison	28 January 1991 (aged 26)	5	0	(Jamaica Football Federation) Portmore United
10	FW	Darren Mattocks	2 June 1990 (aged 27)	36	12	(United States Soccer Federation) Portland Timbers
11	FW	Cory Burke	28 December 1991 (aged 25)	5	2	(United States Soccer Federation) Bethlehem Steel
12	MF	Michael Binns	12 August 1988 (aged 28)	8	0	(Jamaica Football Federation) Portmore United
13	GK	Dwayne Miller	14 July 1987 (aged 29)	38	0	(Swedish Football Association) Syrianska
14	FW	Shamar Nicholson	16 March 1997 (aged 20)	2	0	(Jamaica Football Federation) Boys' Town
15	MF	Je-Vaughn Watson	22 October 1983 (aged 33)	63	3	(United States Soccer Federation) New England Revolution
16	FW	Jermaine Johnson	25 June 1980 (aged 37)	68	9	(Jamaica Football Federation) Tivoli Gardens
17	MF	Kevon Lambert	22 March 1997 (aged 20)	1	0	(Jamaica Football Federation) Montego Bay United
18	MF	Owayne Gordon	8 October 1991 (aged 25)	5	0	(Jamaica Football Federation) Montego Bay United
19	MF	Ricardo Morris	11 February 1992 (aged 25)	3	0	(Jamaica Football Federation) Portmore United
20	DF	Kemar Lawrence	17 September 1992 (aged 24)	36	2	(United States Soccer Federation) New York Red Bulls
21	DF	Jermaine Taylor	14 January 1985 (aged 32)	91	0	(United States Soccer Federation) Minnesota United FC
22	FW	Romario Williams	15 August 1994 (aged 22)	3	0	(United States Soccer Federation) Charleston Battery
23	GK	Damion Hyatt	23 December 1985 (aged 31)	0	0	(Jamaica Football Federation) Arnett Gardens

=== Mexico ===
Head coach: (Colombia) Pompilio Páez

Alan Pulido withdrew from the squad due to injury and was replaced by Erick Torres.

No.	Pos.	Player	Date of birth (age)	Caps	Goals	Club
1	GK	José de Jesús Corona	26 January 1981 (aged 36)	44	0	(Mexican Football Federation) Cruz Azul
2	DF	Luis Rodríguez	21 January 1991 (aged 26)	3	0	(Mexican Football Federation) Tigres UANL
3	DF	Jair Pereira	7 July 1986 (aged 31)	3	0	(Mexican Football Federation) Guadalajara
4	DF	Hugo Ayala (captain)	31 March 1987 (aged 30)	31	0	(Mexican Football Federation) Tigres UANL
5	MF	Jesús Molina	29 March 1988 (aged 29)	24	0	(Mexican Football Federation) Monterrey
6	DF	Edson Álvarez	24 October 1997 (aged 19)	1	0	(Mexican Football Federation) América
7	MF	Orbelín Pineda	24 March 1996 (aged 21)	9	0	(Mexican Football Federation) Guadalajara
8	MF	Érick Gutiérrez	15 June 1995 (aged 22)	4	0	(Mexican Football Federation) Pachuca
9	FW	Erick Torres	19 January 1993 (aged 24)	4	1	(United States Soccer Federation) Houston Dynamo
10	FW	Martín Barragán	14 July 1991 (aged 25)	2	0	(Mexican Football Federation) Necaxa
11	MF	Elías Hernández	29 April 1988 (aged 29)	16	3	(Mexican Football Federation) León
12	GK	Miguel Fraga	3 September 1987 (aged 29)	0	0	(Mexican Football Federation) Atlas
13	DF	César Montes	24 February 1997 (aged 20)	0	0	(Mexican Football Federation) Monterrey
14	DF	Hedgardo Marín	21 February 1993 (aged 24)	4	0	(Mexican Football Federation) Guadalajara
15	MF	Rodolfo Pizarro	15 February 1994 (aged 23)	8	2	(Mexican Football Federation) Guadalajara
16	MF	Jorge Hernández	10 June 1989 (aged 28)	2	0	(Mexican Football Federation) Pachuca
17	DF	Raúl López	23 February 1993 (aged 24)	4	0	(Mexican Football Federation) Pachuca
18	MF	Jesús Gallardo	14 August 1994 (aged 22)	9	0	(Mexican Football Federation) Pumas UNAM
19	FW	Ángel Sepúlveda	15 February 1991 (aged 26)	4	1	(Mexican Football Federation) Morelia
20	MF	Jesús Dueñas	16 March 1989 (aged 28)	19	1	(Mexican Football Federation) Tigres UANL
21	DF	Luis Reyes	3 April 1991 (aged 26)	6	0	(Mexican Football Federation) Atlas
22	DF	Alejandro Mayorga	29 May 1997 (aged 20)	0	0	(Mexican Football Federation) Guadalajara
23	GK	Moisés Muñoz	1 February 1980 (aged 37)	18	0	(Mexican Football Federation) Puebla

== Player representation ==
=== By club ===
Players	Clubs
10	(Nicaragua) Real Estelí
7	(Canada) Toronto FC (El Salvador) Alianza
6	(Martinique) Club Franciscain
5	(Canada) Vancouver Whitecaps FC (Honduras) Real España (Mexico) Guadalajara (United States) Seattle Sounders FC
4	(El Salvador) Santa Tecla (Honduras) Motagua (Honduras) Olimpia (Martinique) Golden Lion (Mexico) Pachuca (United States) FC Dallas (United States) Houston Dynamo (United States) Portland Timbers (United States) San Jose Earthquakes
3	(Canada) Montreal Impact (Costa Rica) Alajuelense (El Salvador) Águila (Jamaica) Montego Bay United (Jamaica) Portmore United (Mexico) Tigres UANL (United States) Minnesota United FC (United States) New England Revolution (United States) New York City FC (United States) New York Cosmos (United States) Philadelphia Union (United States) Sporting Kansas City
2	(Costa Rica) Saprissa (Curaçao) Centro Dominguito (France) Tarbes (French Guiana) Cayenne (French Guiana) Matoury (Martinique) Club Colonial (Mexico) Atlas (Mexico) Monterrey (Mexico) Necaxa (Mexico) Tapachula (Mexico) Tijuana (Netherlands) Kozakken Boys (Nicaragua) Diriangén (Nicaragua) Managua (Nicaragua) Walter Ferretti (Panama) Árabe Unido (Panama) Plaza Amador (Panama) Tauro (Switzerland) Lausanne (United States) New York Red Bulls
1	(Bulgaria) Ludogorets Razgrad (Canada) FC Edmonton (China) Baoding Yingli ETS (Colombia) Atlético Bucaramanga (Colombia) Atlético Nacional (Colombia) Real Cartagena (Costa Rica) Cartaginés (Curaçao) Scherpenheuvel (Czech Republic) Slavia Prague (Denmark) Vendsyssel FF (El Salvador) Isidro Metapán (England) Arsenal (England) Aston Villa (England) Burnley (England) Chelsea (England) Nottingham Forest (England) Queens Park Rangers (England) Shrewsbury Town (England) Sunderland (France) Belfort (France) Brest (France) Chambly (France) Châteaubriant (France) Chartres (France) Drancy (France) Guingamp (France) Paris Saint-Germain B (France) Rennes (France) Saint-Malo (France) Stade Bordelais (France) Villefranche (French Guiana) Black Stars (French Guiana) Étoile Matoury (French Guiana) Le Geldar (French Guiana) Montjoly (Germany) Erzgebirge Aue (Germany) 1. FC Saarbrücken (Greece) Xanthi (Guatemala) Comunicaciones (Guatemala) Suchitepéquez; Honduras Progreso; Juticalpa; CD Real Sociedad; Vida (Hungary) Vasas (Iceland) ÍBV (Iceland) Njarðvík (India) Delhi Dynamos (Italy) Bologna (Italy) Campobasso (Jamaica) Arnett Gardens (Jamaica) Boys' Town (Jamaica) Harbour View (Jamaica) Tivoli Gardens (Japan) Yokohama F. Marinos (Martinique) Aiglon (Martinique) Case-Pilote (Martinique) Rivière-Pilote (Martinique) Samaritaine (Mexico) América (Mexico) Cruz Azul (Mexico) Juárez (Mexico) León (Mexico) Morelia (Mexico) Puebla (Mexico) Pumas UNAM (Mexico) Santos Laguna (Netherlands) Achilles '29 (Netherlands) Go Ahead Eagles (Netherlands) Helmond Sport (Netherlands) IJsselmeervogels (Netherlands) Oss (Netherlands) Vitesse (Netherlands) Willem II (Nicaragua) Chinandega (Nicaragua) Juventus Managua (Nicaragua) UNAN Managua (Panama) San Francisco (Panama) Sporting San Miguelito (Peru) Comerciantes Unidos (Philippines) Global Cebu (Poland) Lechia Gdańsk (Poland) Legia Warsaw (Portugal) Boavista (Portugal) Marítimo (Portugal) Porto B (Portugal) Santa Clara (Portugal) Sporting CP (Scotland) Celtic (Spain) Albacete (Spain) Izarra (Spain) Tenerife (Slovakia) Dunajská Streda (Slovakia) Trenčín (Sweden) Syrianska (Thailand) Bangkok Glass (Turkey) Gazişehir Gaziantep (United States) Atlanta United FC (United States) Bethlehem Steel (United States) Charleston Battery (United States) Chicago Fire (United States) Colorado Rapids (United States) D.C. United (United States) LA Galaxy (United States) Louisville City (United States) Orlando City SC (United States) Pittsburgh Riverhounds (United States) Reno 1868 (United States) Tampa Bay Rowdies (Uruguay) Danubio (Uruguay) Peñarol (Venezuela) Zamora (Wales) Cardiff City

=== By club nationality ===
Players	Countries
53	United States
30	Mexico
19	Nicaragua
17	Honduras
16	Canada; Martinique
15	El Salvador
14	France
13	Costa Rica
10	Jamaica
9	Netherlands
8	England; French Guiana; Panama
5	Portugal
3	Colombia; Curaçao; Spain
2	Germany; Guatemala; Iceland; Italy; Poland; Slovakia; Switzerland; Uruguay
1	Bulgaria; China; Czech Republic; Denmark; Greece; Hungary; India; Israel; Japan; Peru; Philippines; Scotland; Sweden; Thailand; Turkey; Venezuela; Wales

The above table is the same when it comes to league representation, with only the following exceptions:

- The English league had nine representatives with the inclusion of one player coming from Wales-based Cardiff City.

Nations or territories in italics were not represented by their national teams in this tournament.
