= 2017 CONCACAF Gold Cup Group B =

Football tournament results

Group B of the 2017 CONCACAF Gold Cup consisted of hosts United States, Panama, Martinique, and Nicaragua. Matches began on July 8 and ended on July 15, 2017.

== Teams ==
Draw position	Team	Zone	Method of qualification	Date of qualification	Finals appearance	Last appearance	Previous best performance	FIFA Rankings at start of event
B1	United States	NAFU	Automatic / Hosts	N/A	14th	2015	Winners (1991, 2002, 2005, 2007, 2013)	35
B2	Panama	UNCAF	2017 Copa Centroamericana 2nd place	January 20, 2017	8th	2015	Runners-up (2005, 2013)	52
B3	Martinique	CFU	2017 Caribbean Cup 4th place	October 11, 2016	5th	2013	Quarter-finals (2002)	N/A
B4	Nicaragua	UNCAF	CFU–UNCAF play-off winners	March 28, 2017	2nd	2009	Group stage (2009)	105

== Standings ==
Pos	Team	Pld	W	D	L	GF	GA	GD	Pts	Qualification
1	United States (H)	3	2	1	0	7	3	+4	7	Advance to knockout stage
2	Panama	3	2	1	0	6	2	+4	7	Advance to knockout stage
3	Martinique	3	1	0	2	4	6	−2	3	
4	Nicaragua	3	0	0	3	1	7	−6	0	

Source: CONCACAF
Rules for classification: Group stage tiebreakers
(H) Hosts

In the quarter-finals:

- The winners of Group B, the United States, advanced to play the third-placed team of Group C, El Salvador.
- The runners-up of Group B, Panama, advanced to play the winners of Group A, Costa Rica.

== Matches ==
=== United States vs Panama ===
July 8, 2017
16:30
15:30 CDT (UTC−5)

United States	1–1	Panama
Dwyer 50'	Report	Camargo 60'

Nissan Stadium, Nashville
Attendance: 47,622
Referee: Fernando Guerrero (Mexico)

United States	Panama

GK	1	Brad Guzan
RB	19	Graham Zusi
CB	3	Omar Gonzalez
CB	5	Matt Besler
LB	2	Jorge Villafaña
CM	13	Dax McCarty
CM	23	Kellyn Acosta
RW	11	Alejandro Bedoya (c)	(substituted off) 85'
AM	10	Joe Corona	(substituted off) 61'
LW	6	Kelyn Rowe	(substituted off) 69'
CF	14	Dom Dwyer
Substitutions:
FW	18	Juan Agudelo	(substituted on) 61'
MF	9	Gyasi Zardes	(substituted on) 69'
FW	8	Jordan Morris	(substituted on) 85'
Manager:
Bruce Arena

GK	12	José Calderón
RB	2	Michael Amir Murillo
CB	4	Jan Carlos Vargas
CB	23	Roberto Chen
LB	17	Luis Ovalle
RM	8	Yoel Bárcenas
CM	6	Gabriel Gómez (c)	(substituted off) 79'
CM	20	Aníbal Godoy
LM	18	Miguel Camargo	(substituted off) 71'
CF	9	Gabriel Torres
CF	10	Ismael Díaz	(substituted off) 57'
Substitutions:
FW	22	Abdiel Arroyo	(substituted on) 57'
MF	11	Armando Cooper	(substituted on) 71'
MF	19	Josiel Núñez	(substituted on) 79'
Manager:
(Colombia) Hernán Darío Gómez

Man of the Match:
Miguel Camargo (Panama)

Assistant referees:
Marcos Quintero (Mexico)
Miguel Hernández (Mexico)
Fourth official:
Roberto García (Mexico)

=== Martinique vs Nicaragua ===
July 8, 2017
19:00
18:00 CDT (UTC−5)

Martinique	2–0	Nicaragua
Parsemain 35'; Langil 66'	Report

Nissan Stadium, Nashville
Attendance: 47,622
Referee: Kimbell Ward (Saint Kitts and Nevis)

Martinique	Nicaragua

GK	23	Kévin Olimpa
RB	5	Karl Vitulin
CB	8	Jordy Delem
CB	3	Antoine Jean-Baptiste	(yellow card) 70'
LB	21	Sébastien Crétinoir (c)	(yellow card) 62'
CM	19	Daniel Hérelle
CM	20	Stéphane Abaul
CM	18	Jean-Emmanuel Nédra	(yellow card) 33'	(substituted off) 65'
RW	17	Kévin Parsemain
CF	11	Johan Audel		(substituted off) 77'
LW	12	Yoann Arquin	(yellow card) 82'	(substituted off) 89'
Substitutions:
FW	10	Steeven Langil		(substituted on) 65'
MF	13	Christophe Jougon		(substituted on) 77'
FW	9	Anthony Angély		(substituted on) 89'
Manager:
(France) Jean-Marc Civault

GK	1	Justo Lorente
RB	2	Josué Quijano
CB	5	Erick Téllez
CB	6	Luis Copete
LB	3	Manuel Rosas (c)
CM	15	Bismarck Montiel		(substituted off) 87'
CM	8	Marlon López
RW	7	Carlos Chavarría	(yellow card) 88'
AM	10	Luis Galeano
LW	16	Elvis Pinel		(substituted off) 58'
CF	21	Jorge García		(substituted off) 46'
Substitutions:
FW	14	Eulises Pavón		(substituted on) 46'
MF	13	Bryan García		(substituted on) 58'
DF	17	Bismarck Veliz		(substituted on) 87'
Manager:
(Germany) Stephen Manfred

Man of the Match:
Kévin Parsemain (Martinique)

Assistant referees:
Graeme Browne (Saint Kitts and Nevis)
Joseph Bertrand (Trinidad and Tobago)
Fourth official:
Gladwyn Johnson (Guyana)

=== Panama vs Nicaragua ===
July 12, 2017
18:30

Panama	2–1	Nicaragua
Díaz 49'; Torres 57'	Report	Chavarría 48'

Raymond James Stadium, Tampa
Attendance: 23,368
Referee: Drew Fischer (Canada)

Panama	Nicaragua

GK	12	José Calderón
RB	2	Michael Amir Murillo
CB	13	Roderick Miller
CB	5	Fidel Escobar
LB	15	Erick Davis
CM	8	Yoel Bárcenas		(substituted off) 86'
CM	20	Aníbal Godoy	(yellow card) 64'
CM	18	Miguel Camargo		(substituted off) 65'
RW	9	Gabriel Torres
CF	6	Gabriel Gómez (c)
LW	10	Ismael Díaz		(substituted off) 69'
Substitutions:
MF	19	Josiel Núñez		(substituted on) 65'
FW	7	Ricardo Clarke		(substituted on) 69'
MF	11	Armando Cooper		(substituted on) 86'
Manager:
(Colombia) Hernán Darío Gómez

GK	1	Justo Lorente
CB	5	Erick Téllez
CB	8	Marlon López		(substituted off) 81'
CB	6	Luis Copete
RWB	2	Josué Quijano
LWB	3	Manuel Rosas		(substituted off) 70'
RM	9	Daniel Cadena
CM	11	Juan Barrera (c)
CM	10	Luis Galeano
LM	7	Carlos Chavarría	(yellow card) 6'
CF	14	Eulises Pavón		(substituted off) 46'
Substitutions:
MF	19	Luis Peralta		(substituted on) 46'
DF	22	Cyril Errington		(substituted on) 70'
MF	13	Bryan García		(substituted on) 81'
Manager:
(Costa Rica) Henry Duarte

Man of the Match:
Ismael Díaz (Panama)

Assistant referees:
José Luis Camargo (Mexico)
Ainsley Rochard (Trinidad and Tobago)
Fourth official:
Walter López (Guatemala)

=== United States vs Martinique ===
July 12, 2017
20:30

United States	3–2	Martinique
O. Gonzalez 53'; Morris 64', 76'	Report	Parsemain 66', 74'

Raymond James Stadium, Tampa
Attendance: 23,368
Referee: Henry Bejarano (Costa Rica)

United States	Martinique

GK	1	Brad Guzan (c)
RB	15	Eric Lichaj
CB	3	Omar Gonzalez
CB	21	Matt Hedges
LB	16	Justin Morrow	(yellow card) 81'
RM	9	Gyasi Zardes
CM	23	Kellyn Acosta		(substituted off) 62'
CM	17	Cristian Roldan
LM	20	Paul Arriola		(substituted off) 73'
CF	8	Jordan Morris
CF	18	Juan Agudelo		(substituted off) 86'
Substitutions:
MF	11	Alejandro Bedoya		(substituted on) 62'
MF	7	Chris Pontius		(substituted on) 73'
MF	13	Dax McCarty		(substituted on) 86'
Manager:
Bruce Arena

GK	23	Kévin Olimpa
RB	5	Karl Vitulin	(yellow card) 62'
CB	8	Jordy Delem
CB	3	Antoine Jean-Baptiste
LB	21	Sébastien Crétinoir (c)
CM	2	Nicolas Zaïre		(substituted off) 56'
CM	20	Stéphane Abaul
CM	19	Daniel Hérelle		(substituted off) 78'
RW	12	Yoann Arquin		(substituted off) 64'
CF	11	Johan Audel
LW	17	Kévin Parsemain
Substitutions:
MF	18	Jean-Emmanuel Nédra		(substituted on) 56'
FW	10	Steeven Langil		(substituted on) 64'
FW	22	Johnny Marajo		(substituted on) 78'
Manager:
(France) Jean-Marc Civault

Man of the Match:
Jordan Morris (United States)

Assistant referees:
Carlos Fernández (Costa Rica)
Geovany García (El Salvador)
Fourth official:
Juan Gabriel Calderón (Costa Rica)

=== Panama vs Martinique ===
July 15, 2017
16:30

Panama	3–0	Martinique
Murillo 44'; Arroyo 60'; Torres 67'	Report

FirstEnergy Stadium, Cleveland
Attendance: 27,934
Referee: Roberto García (Mexico)

Panama	Martinique

GK	12	José Calderón
RB	2	Michael Amir Murillo
CB	5	Fidel Escobar
CB	23	Roberto Chen
LB	17	Luis Ovalle
RM	11	Armando Cooper
CM	6	Gabriel Gómez (c)		(substituted off) 84'
CM	20	Aníbal Godoy		(substituted off) 70'
LM	18	Miguel Camargo
CF	22	Abdiel Arroyo	(yellow card) 78'
CF	9	Gabriel Torres	(yellow card) 56'	(substituted off) 72'
Substitutions:
MF	8	Yoel Bárcenas		(substituted on) 70'
FW	10	Ismael Díaz		(substituted on) 72'
MF	21	Leslie Heráldez		(substituted on) 84'
Manager:
(Colombia) Hernán Darío Gómez

GK	23	Kévin Olimpa
RB	5	Karl Vitulin	(yellow card) 6'
CB	8	Jordy Delem
CB	21	Sébastien Crétinoir (c)
LB	3	Antoine Jean-Baptiste	(yellow card) 18'	(substituted off) 57'
CM	13	Christophe Jougon		(substituted off) 68'
CM	20	Stéphane Abaul
CM	18	Jean-Emmanuel Nédra
RW	11	Johan Audel	(yellow card) 68'	(substituted off) 33'
CF	10	Steeven Langil	(yellow card) 75'
LW	17	Kévin Parsemain
Substitutions:
MF	19	Daniel Hérelle		(substituted on) 33'
FW	12	Yoann Arquin		(substituted on) 57'
MF	14	Yann Thimon	(yellow card) 76'	(substituted on) 68'
Manager:
(France) Jean-Marc Civault

Man of the Match:
Gabriel Torres (Panama)

Assistant referees:
José Luis Camargo (Mexico)
Alberto Morin (Mexico)
Fourth official:
Yadel Martínez (Cuba)

=== Nicaragua vs United States ===
July 15, 2017
19:00

Nicaragua	0–3	United States
	Report	Corona 37'; Rowe 56'; Miazga 88'

FirstEnergy Stadium, Cleveland
Attendance: 27,934
Referee: Melvin Matamoros (Honduras)

Nicaragua	United States

GK	1	Justo Lorente
CB	22	Cyril Errington
CB	19	Luis Peralta	(yellow card) 15'	(substituted off) 46'
CB	6	Luis Copete	(yellow card) 51' (yellow-red card) 85'
RWB	2	Josué Quijano
LWB	17	Bismarck Veliz		(substituted off) 69'
RM	13	Bryan García		(substituted off) 69'
CM	8	Marlon López	(yellow card) 41'
CM	9	Daniel Cadena
LM	11	Juan Barrera (c)
CF	10	Luis Galeano
Substitutions:
FW	21	Jorge García		(substituted on) 46'
FW	14	Eulises Pavón		(substituted on) 69'
DF	4	Henry Niño		(substituted on) 69'
Manager:
(Costa Rica) Henry Duarte

GK	12	Bill Hamid
RB	19	Graham Zusi
CB	4	Matt Miazga
CB	5	Matt Besler
LB	2	Jorge Villafaña
CM	11	Alejandro Bedoya (c)
CM	13	Dax McCarty
CM	10	Joe Corona	(yellow card) 59'	(substituted off) 66'
RW	6	Kelyn Rowe		(substituted off) 61'
CF	14	Dom Dwyer		(substituted off) 74'
LW	7	Chris Pontius
Substitutions:
MF	20	Paul Arriola		(substituted on) 61'
FW	8	Jordan Morris		(substituted on) 66'
FW	18	Juan Agudelo		(substituted on) 74'
Manager:
Bruce Arena

Man of the Match:
Alejandro Bedoya (United States)

Assistant referees:
Christian Ramírez (Honduras)
Ainsley Rochard (Trinidad and Tobago)
Fourth official:
Óscar Moncada (Honduras)
