= 2017 Copa Centroamericana squads =

== Squads ==
=== Belize ===
Head coach: (Poland) Richard Orlowski

The final squad was revealed on 7 January 2017.

No.	Pos.	Player	Date of birth (age)	Caps	Goals	Club
1	GK	Woodrow West	September 19, 1985 (aged 31)	22	0	(National Autonomous Federation of Football of Honduras) C.D. Honduras Progreso
27	GK	Shane Orio	August 7, 1980 (aged 36)	27	0	(Football Federation of Belize) Belmopan Bandits
4	DF	Makonnan Clare	August 29, 1994 (aged 22)	0	0	(United States Soccer Federation) NYIT Bears
7	DF	Ian Gaynair	February 26, 1986 (aged 30)	38	1	(Football Federation of Belize) Belmopan Bandits
8	DF	Elroy Smith	November 30, 1981 (aged 35)	44	2	(Football Federation of Belize) Belmopan Bandits
18	DF	Evral Trapp	January 22, 1987 (aged 29)	21	0	(Football Federation of Belize) Verdes
23	DF	Tyrone Pandy	January 14, 1986 (aged 30)	10	0	(Football Federation of Belize) Belmopan Bandits
26	DF	Mike Atkinson	December 2, 1994 (aged 22)	0	0	(The Football Association) Selby Town
28	DF	Khalil Velasquez	August 13, 1985 (aged 31)	6	0	(Football Federation of Belize) Belmopan Bandits
3	MF	Trevor Lennen	January 5, 1983 (aged 34)	30	1	(Football Federation of Belize) Police United
5	MF	Elroy Kuylen	June 6, 1983 (aged 33)	21	4	(Football Federation of Belize) Belmopan Bandits
6	MF	Andres Makin Jr.	April 11, 1992 (aged 24)	11	0	(Football Federation of Belize) Police United
12	MF	Denmark Casey Jr.	January 14, 1994 (aged 22)	8	0	(Football Federation of Belize) Belmopan Bandits
13	MF	Dellon Torres	June 14, 1994 (aged 22)	4	0	(Football Federation of Belize) Placencia Assassins
16	MF	Jordy Polanco	July 8, 1996 (aged 20)	3	0	(Football Federation of Belize) Belmopan Bandits
17	MF	Devon Makin	November 11, 1990 (aged 26)	9	0	(Football Federation of Belize) Police United
19	MF	Luis Torres	March 2, 1993 (aged 23)	2	0	(Football Federation of Belize) Placencia Assassins
21	MF	Nana-Yaw Amankwah-Mensah	January 19, 1989 (aged 27)	1	0	(Turkish Football Federation) Belediye Bingölspor
9	FW	Deon McCaulay	September 20, 1987 (aged 29)	36	21	(Football Federation of Belize) Verdes
10	FW	Michael Salazar	November 15, 1992 (aged 24)	4	0	(Canadian Soccer Association) Montreal Impact
11	FW	Jarret Davis	June 17, 1989 (aged 27)	6	0	(Football Federation of Belize) Verdes
14	FW	Gilroy Thurton	September 7, 1993 (aged 23)	0	0	(Football Federation of Belize) Verdes
20	FW	Daniel Jimenez	April 14, 1988 (aged 28)	26	2	(Football Federation of Belize) Police United

=== Costa Rica ===
Head coach: (Costa Rica) Óscar Ramírez

The final squad was revealed on 2 January 2017.

No.	Pos.	Player	Date of birth (age)	Caps	Goals	Club
1	GK	Danny Carvajal	8 January 1989 (aged 28)	1	0	(Costa Rican Football Federation) Saprissa
18	GK	Patrick Pemberton	24 May 1982 (aged 34)	33	0	(Costa Rican Football Federation) Alajuelense
23	GK	Leonel Moreira	2 April 1990 (aged 26)	7	0	(Costa Rican Football Federation) Herediano
2	DF	Jhonny Acosta	21 July 1983 (aged 33)	53	2	(Costa Rican Football Federation) Herediano
3	DF	Jhamir Ordain	29 July 1993 (aged 23)	2	0	(Costa Rican Football Federation) Santos de Guápiles
4	DF	Michael Umaña	16 July 1982 (aged 34)	95	1	(Costa Rican Football Federation) Alajuelense
5	DF	Kenner Gutiérrez	9 June 1989 (aged 27)	2	0	(Costa Rican Football Federation) Alajuelense
6	DF	Allan Miranda	28 May 1987 (aged 29)	3	0	(Costa Rican Football Federation) Herediano
13	DF	Pedro Leal	31 January 1989 (aged 27)	13	0	(Costa Rican Football Federation) Carmelita
15	DF	Francisco Calvo	8 July 1992 (aged 24)	19	0	(United States Soccer Federation) Minnesota United
19	DF	Juan Pablo Vargas	6 June 1995 (aged 21)	1	0	(Costa Rican Football Federation) Belén
22	DF	Christopher Meneses	2 May 1990 (aged 26)	18	0	(Costa Rican Football Federation) Alajuelense
7	MF	John Jairo Ruiz	10 January 1994 (aged 23)	6	1	(Football Association of Serbia) Red Star Belgrade
12	MF	Elías Aguilar	7 November 1991 (aged 25)	11	0	(Costa Rican Football Federation) Herediano
10	MF	Marvin Angulo	30 September 1986 (aged 30)	4	0	(Costa Rican Football Federation) Saprissa
14	MF	Randall Azofeifa	30 December 1984 (aged 32)	49	3	(Costa Rican Football Federation) Herediano
16	MF	Gerson Torres	28 August 1997 (aged 19)	2	0	(Mexican Football Federation) América
17	MF	Osvaldo Rodríguez	17 December 1990 (aged 26)	13	0	(Costa Rican Football Federation) Santos de Guápiles
20	MF	David Guzmán	18 February 1990 (aged 26)	25	0	(United States Soccer Federation) Portland Timbers
21	MF	Ulises Segura	23 January 1993 (aged 23)	1	0	(Costa Rican Football Federation) Saprissa
8	FW	Deyver Vega	19 September 1992 (aged 24)	10	0	(Norwegian Football Federation) Brann
9	FW	José Guillermo Ortiz	20 June 1992 (aged 24)	2	2	(United States Soccer Federation) D.C. United
11	FW	Johan Venegas	27 November 1988 (aged 28)	33	8	(United States Soccer Federation) Minnesota United

=== El Salvador ===
Head coach: (Colombia) Eduardo Lara

The final squad was revealed on 10 January 2017. Caps and goals as of September 6, 2016 after the game against Canada.

No.	Pos.	Player	Date of birth (age)	Caps	Goals	Club
1	GK	Henry Hernández	January 4, 1985 (aged 32)	21	0	(Salvadoran Football Federation) Dragon
18	GK	Óscar Arroyo	January 28, 1990 (aged 26)	5	0	(Salvadoran Football Federation) Alianza
22	GK	Benji Villalobos	July 15, 1988 (aged 28)	11	0	(Salvadoran Football Federation) Aguila
2	DF	Ibsen Castro	October 24, 1988 (aged 28)	10	1	(Salvadoran Football Federation) Águila
3	DF	Roberto Domínguez	May 9, 1997 (aged 19)	10	0	(Salvadoran Football Federation) Santa Tecla
4	DF	Henry Romero	September 17, 1991 (aged 25)	17	1	(Salvadoran Football Federation) Águila
5	DF	Ivan Mancia	November 7, 1987 (aged 29)	4	0	(Salvadoran Football Federation) Santa Tecla
13	DF	Alexander Larín	June 27, 1992 (aged 24)	42	4	(Salvadoran Football Federation) Alianza
17	DF	Juan Barahona	February 12, 1995 (aged 21)	12	1	(Salvadoran Football Federation) Santa Tecla
21	DF	Bryan Tamacas	February 21, 1995 (aged 21)	7	0	(Uruguayan Football Association) Boston River
23	DF	Óscar Menjivar	October 1, 1997 (aged 19)	0	0	(Salvadoran Football Federation) UES
6	MF	Richard Menjivar	October 31, 1990 (aged 26)	36	1	(United States Soccer Federation) New York Cosmos
7	MF	Darwin Cerén	December 31, 1989 (aged 27)	38	2	(United States Soccer Federation) San Jose Earthquakes
10	MF	Jaime Alas	July 30, 1989 (aged 27)	59	6	(National Football Federation of Guatemala) Municipal
12	MF	Herbert Sosa	January 11, 1990 (aged 27)	17	2	(Salvadoran Football Federation) Alianza
14	MF	Andrés Flores	August 31, 1990 (aged 26)	54	0	(United States Soccer Federation) New York Cosmos
15	MF	Néstor Renderos	September 19, 1996 (aged 20)	12	0	(Salvadoran Football Federation) FAS
16	MF	Óscar Cerén	October 26, 1991 (aged 25)	14	1	(Salvadoran Football Federation) Alianza
19	MF	Gerson Mayen	February 9, 1989 (aged 27)	21	1	(Salvadoran Football Federation) Santa Tecla
20	MF	Pablo Punyed	April 18, 1990 (aged 26)	22	2	(Football Association of Iceland) ÍBV
8	FW	Irvin Herrera	August 30, 1991 (aged 25)	12	1	(United States Soccer Federation) Saint Louis FC
9	FW	Rodolfo Zelaya	July 3, 1988 (aged 28)	40	18	(Salvadoran Football Federation) Alianza
11	FW	Nelson Bonilla	September 11, 1990 (aged 26)	33	10	(Portuguese Football Federation) Nacional

=== Honduras ===
Head coach: (Colombia) Jorge Luis Pinto

The final squad was revealed on 12 January 2017. Caps and goals current as of November 15, 2016 after the match against Trinidad and Tobago.

No.	Pos.	Player	Date of birth (age)	Caps	Goals	Club
	GK	Donis Escober	February 3, 1980 (aged 36)	50	0	(National Autonomous Federation of Football of Honduras) Olimpia
	GK	Luis López	September 13, 1993 (aged 23)	2	0	(National Autonomous Federation of Football of Honduras) Real España
	DF	Henry Figueroa	December 28, 1992 (aged 24)	19	0	(National Autonomous Federation of Football of Honduras) Motagua
	DF	César Oseguera	July 20, 1990 (aged 26)	10	0	(National Autonomous Federation of Football of Honduras) Real España
	DF	Ever Alvarado	January 30, 1992 (aged 24)	9	1	(National Autonomous Federation of Football of Honduras) Olimpia
	DF	Brayan García	October 19, 1994 (aged 22)	5	0	(National Autonomous Federation of Football of Honduras) Vida
	DF	Marcelo Pereira	May 27, 1995 (aged 21)	3	0	(National Autonomous Federation of Football of Honduras) Motagua
	DF	Félix Crisanto	September 9, 1990 (aged 26)	2	0	(National Autonomous Federation of Football of Honduras) Motagua
	DF	Allans Vargas	September 25, 1993 (aged 23)	2	0	(National Autonomous Federation of Football of Honduras) Real España
	MF	Jorge Claros	January 8, 1986 (aged 31)	71	3	(National Autonomous Federation of Football of Honduras) Real España
	MF	Luis Garrido	November 5, 1990 (aged 26)	37	0	(National Autonomous Federation of Football of Honduras) Olimpia
	MF	Alfredo Mejía	April 3, 1990 (aged 26)	29	1	(National Autonomous Federation of Football of Honduras) Marathón
	MF	Erick Andino	July 21, 1989 (aged 27)	15	3	(National Autonomous Federation of Football of Honduras) Motagua
	MF	Alexander López	June 5, 1992 (aged 24)	9	0	(Saudi Arabian Football Federation) Khaleej
	MF	Óliver Morazán	January 5, 1988 (aged 29)	7	0	(National Autonomous Federation of Football of Honduras) Juticalpa F.C.
	MF	Óscar Salas	November 30, 1993 (aged 23)	3	1	(National Autonomous Federation of Football of Honduras) Olimpia
	MF	Marcelo Canales	January 6, 1991 (aged 26)	3	0	(National Autonomous Federation of Football of Honduras) Olimpia
	MF	Michaell Chirinos	June 17, 1995 (aged 21)	3	0	(National Autonomous Federation of Football of Honduras) Olimpia
	MF	Jairo Puerto	December 28, 1988 (aged 28)	3	0	(National Autonomous Federation of Football of Honduras) Marathón
	MF	Cristhian Altamirano	November 26, 1989 (aged 27)	2	0	(National Autonomous Federation of Football of Honduras) Real España
	FW	Eddie Hernández	February 27, 1991 (aged 25)	16	3	(Colombian Football Federation) Deportes Tolima
	FW	Rubilio Castillo	November 26, 1991 (aged 25)	14	4	(National Autonomous Federation of Football of Honduras) Motagua
	FW	Diego Reyes	January 11, 1990 (aged 27)	11	2	(National Autonomous Federation of Football of Honduras) Marathón

=== Nicaragua ===
Head coach: (Costa Rica) Henry Duarte

The final squad was revealed on 10 January 2017.
Caps and goals updated as of December 30, 2016 after the game against Trinidad and Tobago.

No.	Pos.	Player	Date of birth (age)	Caps	Goals	Club
	GK	Justo Lorente	February 27, 1994 (aged 22)	17	0	(Nicaraguan Football Federation) Real Estelí
	GK	Róger Sánchez	June 12, 1992 (aged 24)	0	0	(Nicaraguan Football Federation) UNAN Managua
	GK	Diedrich Téllez	October 31, 1984 (aged 32)	5	0	(Nicaraguan Football Federation) Juventus
	DF	Jason Casco	February 13, 1990 (aged 26)	17	0	(Nicaraguan Football Federation) Real Estelí
	DF	Luis Fernando Copete	February 12, 1989 (aged 27)	19	3	(Peruvian Football Federation) Comerciantes Unidos
	DF	Cyril Errington	March 30, 1992 (aged 24)	1	0	(Salvadoran Football Federation) UES
	DF	Oscar López	February 27, 1992 (aged 24)	4	0	(Nicaraguan Football Federation) Managua
	DF	Josué Quijano	March 10, 1991 (aged 25)	35	1	(Nicaraguan Football Federation) Real Estelí
	DF	Manuel Rosas	October 14, 1983 (aged 33)	21	2	(Nicaraguan Football Federation) Real Estelí
	DF	Erick Téllez	January 28, 1989 (aged 27)	18	0	(Nicaraguan Football Federation) Diriangén
	DF	Bismarck Veliz	September 10, 1993 (aged 23)	7	0	(Nicaraguan Football Federation) Chinandega
	MF	Juan Barrera (Captain)	March 2, 1989 (aged 27)	33	6	(National Football Federation of Guatemala) Comunicaciones
	MF	Jason Coronel	October 6, 1993 (aged 23)	5	0	(Nicaraguan Football Federation) Diriangén
	MF	Bryan García	May 25, 1995 (aged 21)	8	1	(Nicaraguan Football Federation) Real Estelí
	MF	Lesther Jarquin	February 16, 1992 (aged 24)	2	0	(Nicaraguan Football Federation) Juventus
	MF	Marlon López	November 2, 1992 (aged 24)	14	0	(Nicaraguan Football Federation) Real Estelí
	MF	Maykel Montiel	January 27, 1993 (aged 23)	4	0	(Nicaraguan Football Federation) UNAN Managua
	MF	Luis Peralta	October 12, 1988 (aged 28)	11	1	(Nicaraguan Football Federation) Walter Ferretti
	MF	Elvis Pinel	March 22, 1992 (aged 24)	20	1	(Nicaraguan Football Federation) Real Estelí
	MF	Alexis Somarriba	May 11, 1994 (aged 22)	2	0	(Nicaraguan Football Federation) Managua
	FW	Daniel Cadena	February 9, 1987 (aged 29)	9	2	(Nicaraguan Football Federation) Real Esteli
	FW	Norfran Lazo	September 8, 1990 (aged 26)	12	1	(Nicaraguan Football Federation) Managua
	FW	Jaime Moreno	March 30, 1995 (aged 21)	1	0	(Royal Spanish Football Federation) Cultural Leonesa

=== Panama ===
Head coach: (Colombia) Hernán Darío Gómez

The final squad was revealed on 7 January 2017.

No.	Pos.	Player	Date of birth (age)	Caps	Goals	Club
	GK	José Calderón	14 August 1985 (aged 31)	17	0	(National Autonomous Federation of Football of Honduras) Platense
	GK	Álex Rodríguez	5 August 1990 (aged 26)	5	0	(Costa Rican Football Federation) Pérez Zeledón
	DF	Harold Cummings	1 March 1992 (aged 24)	46	0	(Costa Rican Football Federation) Alajuelense
	DF	Luis Ovalle	7 September 1988 (aged 28)	9	0	(Venezuelan Football Federation) Zamora
	DF	Ángel Patrick	27 February 1992 (aged 24)	3	0	(Panamanian Football Federation) Árabe Unido
	DF	Azmahar Ariano	14 January 1991 (aged 25)	1	0	(Panamanian Football Federation) Árabe Unido
	DF	Roderick Miller	3 April 1992 (aged 24)	24	0	(Colombian Football Federation) Atlético Nacional
	DF	Erick Davis	31 March 1991 (aged 25)	28	0	(Slovak Football Association) Dunajská Streda
	DF	Jean Carlos Vargas	13 March 1995 (aged 21)	2	0	(Panamanian Football Federation) Tauro
	MF	Armando Cooper	26 November 1987 (aged 29)	77	5	(Canadian Soccer Association) Toronto FC
	MF	Aníbal Godoy	10 February 1990 (aged 26)	67	1	(United States Soccer Federation) San Jose Earthquakes
	MF	Amílcar Henríquez	2 August 1983 (aged 33)	77	0	(Panamanian Football Federation) Árabe Unido
	MF	Alberto Quintero	18 December 1987 (aged 29)	77	5	(Mexican Football Federation) Lobos BUAP
	MF	Josiel Núñez	29 January 1993 (aged 23)	6	0	(Venezuelan Football Federation) Atlético Venezuela
	MF	Ricardo Buitrago	10 March 1985 (aged 31)	23	3	(Peruvian Football Federation) Juan Aurich
	MF	Óscar Villareal	3 February 1995 (aged 21)	0	0	(Panamanian Football Federation) Chorrillo
	MF	Édgar Bárcenas	October 23, 1993 (aged 23)	9	0	(Panamanian Football Federation) Árabe Unido
	MF	José González	5 May 1991 (aged 25)	5	0	(Panamanian Football Federation) Árabe Unido
	FW	Abdiel Arroyo	13 December 1993 (aged 23)	19	2	(Colombian Football Federation) Deportes Tolima
	FW	Rolando Blackburn	9 January 1990 (aged 27)	23	4	(Costa Rican Football Federation) Saprissa
	FW	Tony Taylor	13 July 1989 (aged 27)	1	0	(United States Soccer Federation) Jacksonville Armada
	FW	Enrico Small	1 May 1989 (aged 27)	0	0	(Panamanian Football Federation) Árabe Unido
