= Luis Peralta =

Luis Peralta may refer to:

- Luis Peralta (Nicaraguan footballer) (born 1988)
- Luis Arturo Peralta (born 1992), Colombian footballer
- Luis Peralta (baseball) (born 2001), Dominican baseball pitcher
- Luis María Peralta (1759–1851), Californio ranchero and soldier in the Spanish Army
