= Kimbell Ward =

Saint Kitts and Nevis football referee (born 1983)

- Born: 8 June 1983 (age 43); Nevis, Saint Kitts and Nevis

Domestic
Years	League	Role
??–present	Football in Saint Kitts and Nevis	Referee

International
Years	League	Role
2013–present	FIFA listed	Referee

Kimbell Ward (born 8 June 1983) is a Saint Kitts and Nevis football referee who has been listed on the FIFA International Referees List since 2013.

== Career ==
Ward was born in Nevis in 1983 and became the first referee from Saint Kitts and Nevis to earn the FIFA international badge. In 2017, he was listed among the seven candidates for the Referee of the Year award by CONCACAF.

Among his most prominent international roles, Ward has taken part in the 2017 CONCACAF Gold Cup hosted by the United States, where he led two group stage matches, Martinique vs Nicaragua and Curaçao vs Mexico. That same year, Ward refereed at the 2017 Copa Centroamericana, later participating in two editions of the CONCACAF Champions League: in the 2018 tournament and in 2021.

Other competitions inside CONCACAF in which Ward oversaw games were the 2024–25 CONCACAF Nations League and the 2025–26 CONCACAF Series, as well as qualification games for the FIFA World Cup and friendly matches.

== Selected performances ==
2017 CONCACAF Gold Cup – United States
Date	Match	Result	Round	Venue
8 July 2017	Martinique – Nicaragua	2–0	Group stage	Nissan Stadium, Nashville
16 July 2017	Curaçao – Mexico	0–2	Group stage	Alamodome, San Antonio
