= Lesther Jarquin =

Nicaraguan footballer

Personal information
- Full name: Lesther David Jarquín
- Date of birth: February 16, 1992 (age 34)
- Place of birth: Managua, Nicaragua
- Height: 1.75 m (5 ft 9 in)
- Position: Midfielder

Team information
- Current team: Managua F.C.

Senior career*
| Years | Team | Apps | (Gls) |
| 2017 | Managua F.C. | | |

International career^{‡}
| 2014– | Nicaragua | 4 | (0) |
- * Club domestic league appearances and goals as of 2017 ‡ National team caps and goals as of 2017

Lesther David Jarquín (born 16 February 1992) is a Nicaraguan footballer who plays for Managua F.C.
