= Miguel Camargo =

Panamanian footballer (born 1993)

Personal information
- Full name: Miguel Elías Camargo Cañizales
- Date of birth: May 9, 1993 (age 33)
- Place of birth: Panama City, Panama
- Position: Attacking midfielder

Team information
- Current team: Veraguas United
- Number: 7

Senior career*
Years	Team	Apps	(Gls)
2013–2018	Chorrillo	58	(6)
2015	→ Águila (loan)	11	(1)
2016	→ Mineros de Guayana (loan)	32	(12)
2017	→ New York City FC (loan)	8	(1)
2018	Universidad San Martín	9	(0)
2018–2019	Mineros de Guayana	32	(5)
2019	Universitario	10	(2)
2020	Deportivo Táchira	9	(1)
2021	Deportivo Pasto	12	(1)
2021–2022	Independiente Medellín	3	(0)
2022–2023	Tauro	31	(1)
2023–2025	San Francisco	62	(11)
2026–	Veraguas United	28	(5)

International career^{‡}
2014–	Panama	28	(3)
- * Club domestic league appearances and goals as of 18:39, 17 August 2020 (UTC) ‡ National team caps and goals as of 5 June 2021

Miguel Elías Camargo Cañizales (born 5 September 1993) is a Panamanian professional footballer who plays as a midfielder for Liga Panameña club Veraguas United.

== Club career ==
After a few seasons on the books of Chorrillo, Camargo moved abroad to join Salvadoran side Águila in January 2015. He returned however to Chorrillo in June 2015.

=== New York City FC ===
On 11 January 2017, it was announced that Camargo would be joining MLS side New York City on loan, with an option to buy. He scored his first goal on 31 May, in a 2–2 draw with New England.

== International career ==
Camargo made his debut for Panama in an August 2014 friendly match against Peru.

In May 2018, Camargo was named in Panama’s preliminary 35-man squad for the 2018 FIFA World Cup in Russia. However, he did not make the final 23.

== International goals ==
Scores and results list Panama's goal tally first.

No.	Date	Venue	Opponent	Score	Result	Competition
1.	14 June 2016	Lincoln Financial Field, Philadelphia, United States	Chile	1–0	2–4	Copa América Centenario
2.	8 July 2017	Nissan Stadium, Nashville, United States	United States	1–1	1–1	2017 CONCACAF Gold Cup
3.	5 June 2021	Estadio Nacional, Panama City, Panama	Anguilla	8–0	13–0	2022 FIFA World Cup qualification

== Honours ==
Panama

- CONCACAF Gold Cup third place: 2015
