= Steeven Langil =

Martiniquais footballer (born 1988)

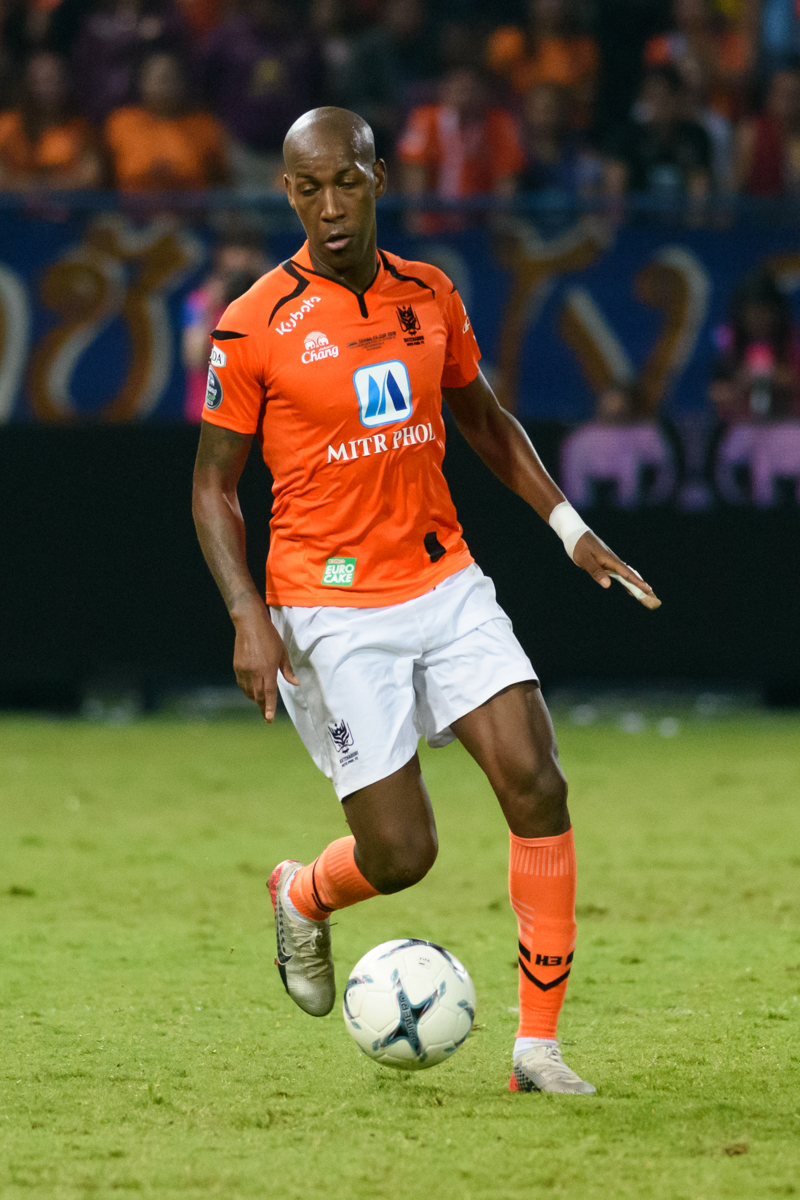

Personal information
- Full name: Steeven Joël Langil
- Date of birth: 4 March 1988 (age 38)
- Place of birth: Fort-de-France, Martinique
- Height: 1.82 m (6 ft 0 in)
- Position: Winger

Team information
- Current team: Sisaket United
- Number: 11

Youth career
- 2003–2006: Nîmes

Senior career*
Years	Team	Apps	(Gls)
2006–2007	Nîmes	11	(2)
2007–2013	Auxerre	68	(4)
2009–2010	→ Caen (loan)	37	(9)
2011	→ Valenciennes (loan)	7	(1)
2011–2012	→ Sedan (loan)	17	(0)
2013–2014	Guingamp	21	(1)
2014–2015	Mouscron-Péruwelz	21	(1)
2015–2016	Waasland-Beveren	35	(6)
2016–2017	Legia Warsaw	6	(1)
2017	→ Waasland-Beveren (loan)	14	(2)
2017–2018	NEC	27	(5)
2018–2022	Ratchaburil	77	(20)
2023	Uthai Thani	19	(3)
2023–2024	Khonkaen United	25	(4)
2024	Kasetsart	11	(4)
2025	Khonkaen United	14	(3)
2025–	Sisaket United	0	(0)

International career
2009	France U21	2	(0)
2016–2017	Martinique	11	(5)
- * Club domestic league appearances and goals as of 9 March 2025

Steeven Joël Langil (born 4 March 1988) is a Martiniquais footballer who plays as a winger for Sisaket United in Thai League 2.

== Career ==
Langil was born in Fort-de-France in Martinique, but grew up in Morne Rouge. He and his family later moved to the city of Montpellier. He began his career playing for third division club Nîmes. He was promoted to the first team in 2006 and appeared in 11 games, scoring two goals. Following the season, he moved to Ligue 1 club AJ Auxerre.

=== Auxerre ===
In Auxerre, he did not feature often. However, he scored an important goal against Ajax Amsterdam during the 2010–11 UEFA Champions League group stage, in which Auxerre came out on top 2-1. After a two-year stint with Auxerre, he joined on loan successively Caen, Valenciennes and Sedan.

=== Guingamp ===
In June 2013, he signed a contract with the Breton club EA Guingamp, which just got promoted into Ligue 1.

=== Royal Mouscron-Péruwelz ===
On 16 July 2014, Langil joined the newly promoted Belgian Pro League side Royal Mouscron-Péruwelz prior to the 2014–15 season.

== Career statistics ==
=== International goals ===
As of match played 8 July 2017. Martinique score listed first, score column indicates score after each Langil goal.

International goals by date, venue, cap, opponent, score, result and competition
No.	Date	Venue	Cap	Opponent	Score	Result	Competition
1	23 March 2016	Stade Pierre-Aliker, Fort-de-France, Martinique	1	British Virgin Islands	3–0	3–0	2017 Caribbean Cup qualification
2	7 June 2016	Windsor Park, Roseau, Dominica	4	Dominica	4–0	4–0	2017 Caribbean Cup qualification
3	8 October 2016	Estadio Panamericano, San Cristóbal, Dominican Republic	5	Dominican Republic	1–0	2–1	2017 Caribbean Cup qualification
4	11 October 2016	Stade Pierre-Aliker, Fort-de-France, Martinique	6	Trinidad and Tobago	2–0	2–0	2017 Caribbean Cup qualification
5	8 July 2017	Nissan Stadium, Nashville, United States	9	Nicaragua	2–0	2–0	2017 CONCACAF Gold Cup
