= Jean-Marc Civault =

French footballer and manager

Personal information
- Full name: Jean-Marc Civault
- Date of birth: June 6, 1965 (age 61)

Team information
- Current team: Club Franciscain (manager)

Managerial career
- Years: Team
- 2012–2016: Martinique (assistant)
- 2014–: Club Franciscain
- 2016–2017: Martinique

Jean-Marc Civault (born 6 June 1966 in) is a former footballer and currently manager of Club Franciscain in the Martinique Championnat National. He has previously managed the Martinique national team, and was their manager at the 2017 CONCACAF Gold Cup tournament, having started that spell in charge of the national team in September 2016.
