= Diedrich Téllez =

Nicaraguan footballer

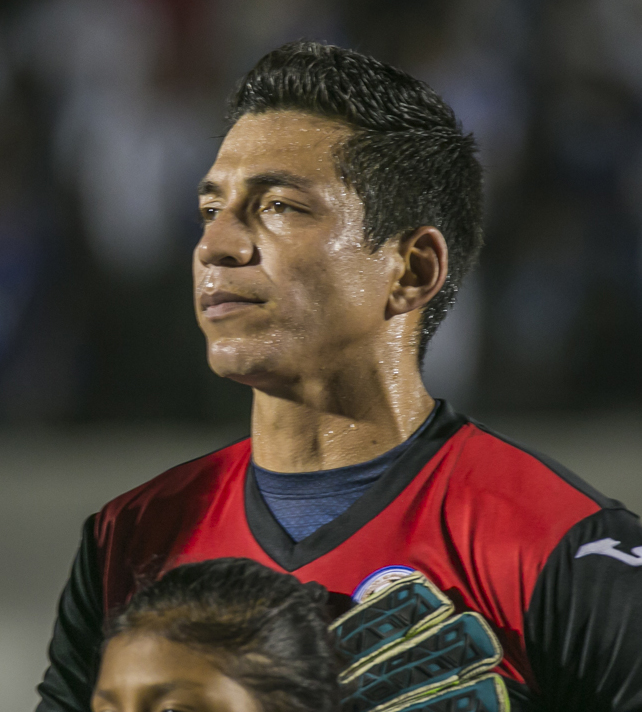

Personal information
- Full name: Diedrich Erwing Téllez Cuevas
- Date of birth: October 31, 1984 (age 41)
- Place of birth: Masaya, Nicaragua
- Position: Goalkeeper

Team information
- Current team: Managua F.C.
- Number: 1

Senior career*
Years	Team	Apps	(Gls)
2008–2011	Diriangen FC		
2012–	Managua F.C.		

International career^{‡}
2012–	Nicaragua	15	(0)
- * Club domestic league appearances and goals as of 2017 ‡ National team caps and goals as of 26 July 2017

Diedrich Erwing Téllez Cuevas (born 31 October 1984) is a Nicaraguan footballer who plays for Managua F.C.
