= Luis Galeano =

Nicaraguan footballer (born 1991)

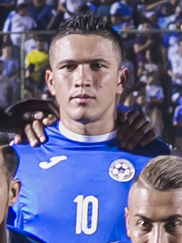
- Galeano with Nicaragua

Personal information
- Full name: Luis Manuel Galeano Molina
- Date of birth: 15 October 1991 (age 35)
- Place of birth: Jalapa, Nicaragua
- Position: Forward

Team information
- Current team: HYH Export Sebaco

Senior career*
Years	Team	Apps	(Gls)
2007-2008	Deportivo Jalapa		
2013–2015	ART Municipal Jalapa	67	(34)
2015–2019	Real Estelí	121	(55)
2019-2021	ART Municipal Jalapa	59	(21)
2021-	HYH Export Sebaco	85	(54)

International career^{‡}
2015–2022	Nicaragua	35	(6)
- * Club domestic league appearances and goals as of 8 February 2024 ‡ National team caps and goals as of 13 October 2022

Luis Manuel Galeano Molina (born 15 October 1991) is a Nicaraguan footballer who plays as a forward for ART Municipal Jalapa and the Nicaragua national team.

== Career statistics ==
Scores and results list Nicaragua's goal tally first.

#	Date	Venue	Opponent	Score	Result	Competition
1.	23 March 2015	Nicaragua National Football Stadium, Managua, Nicaragua	Anguilla	1–0	5–0	2018 FIFA World Cup qualification
2.	5 September 2015	Independence Park, Kingston, Jamaica	Jamaica	3–0	3–2	2018 FIFA World Cup qualification
3.	15 March 2016	Dennis Martínez National Stadium, Managua, Nicaragua	Panama	1–0	1–0	Friendly
4.	25 March 2018	Nicaragua National Football Stadium, Managua, Nicaragua	Cuba	2–0	3–3	Friendly
5.	13 November 2021	Nicaragua National Football Stadium, Managua, Nicaragua	Cuba	2–0	2–0	Friendly
6.	13 October 2022	Estadio Municipal de Marbella, Marbella, Spain	Qatar	1–2	1–2	Friendly
