= Jan Carlos Vargas =

Panamanian footballer (born 1994)

Personal information
- Full name: Jan Carlos Vargas Campos
- Date of birth: 27 September 1994 (age 32)
- Place of birth: Bocas del Toro, Panama
- Height: 1.85 m (6 ft 1 in)
- Position: Centre-back

Team information
- Current team: Al-Karkh SC (on loan from Tauro)
- Number: 5

Senior career*
Years	Team	Apps	(Gls)
2013–	Tauro	272	(9)
2018	→ Deportivo Táchira (loan)	16	(1)
2020–2021	→ Barakaldo (loan)	10	(2)
2021–2022	→ Melilla (loan)	24	(1)
2024	→ Semen Padang (loan)	9	(0)
2025–	→ Al-Karkh SC (loan)	0	(0)

International career
2016–2023	Panama	11	(0)
- * Club domestic league appearances and goals as of 13 September 2025

Jan Carlos Vargas Campos (born 27 September 1993) is a Panamanian professional footballer who plays as a centre-back for Iraq Stars League club Al-Karkh SC on loan from Tauro. He plays his club football for Deportivo Táchira and made his national team debut in 2016. He was named to the Panama squad for the 2017 Gold Cup and started the opener against the United States.
