= Leslie Heráldez =

Panamanian footballer (born 1993)

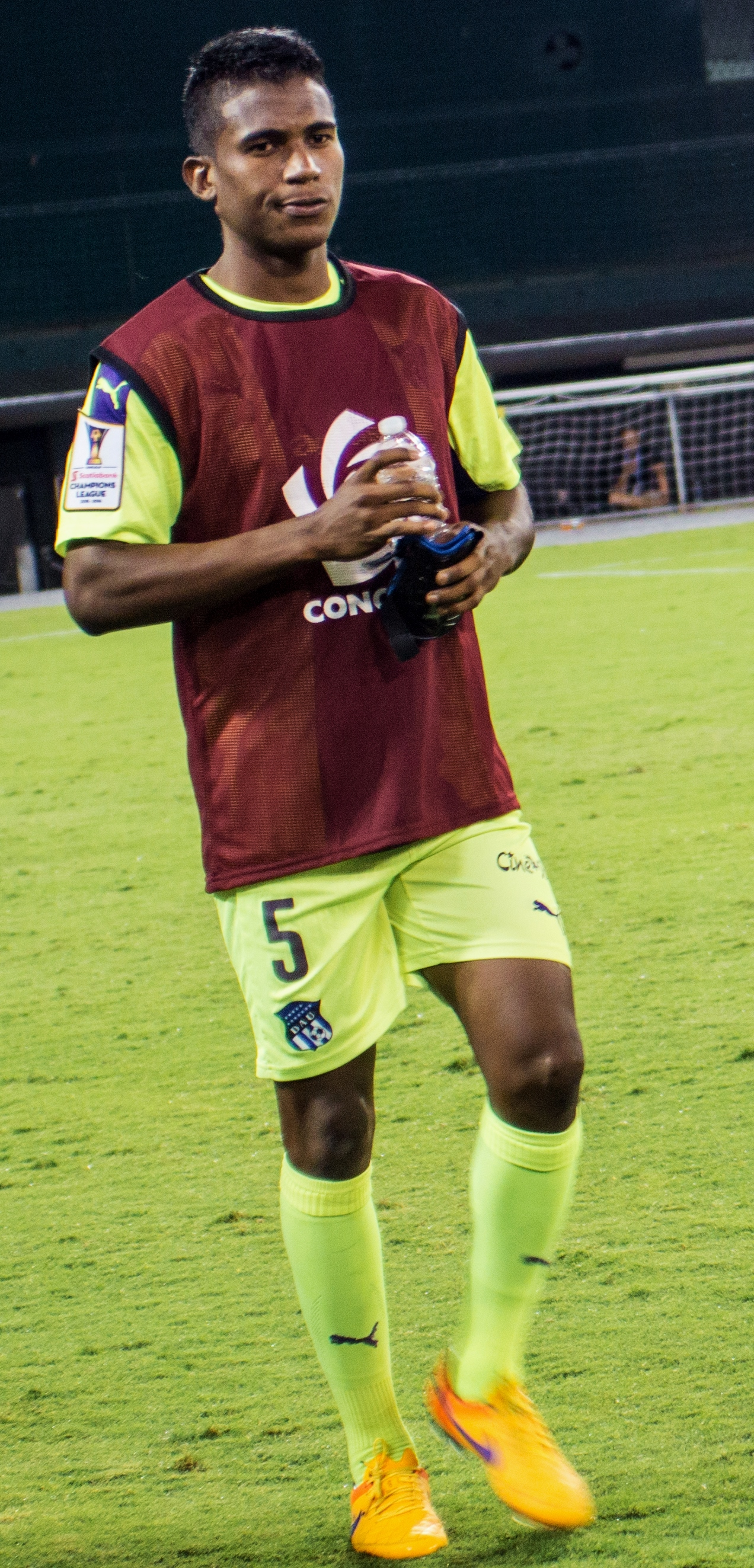
- Heráldez in 2015

Personal information
- Full name: Leslie Eduardo Heráldez Sevillano
- Date of birth: 30 March 1993 (age 33)
- Place of birth: Colón, Panama
- Height: 1.80 m (5 ft 11 in)
- Position: Defensive midfielder

Team information
- Current team: Árabe Unido
- Number: 16

Senior career*
Years	Team	Apps	(Gls)
2012–	Árabe Unido	115	(1)

International career
2017–2018	Panama	6	(0)
- * Club domestic league appearances and goals as of 17 June 2018

Leslie Eduardo Heráldez Sevillano (born 30 March 1993) is a Panamanian footballer who plays as a defensive midfielder for local club Árabe Unido and the Panama national team.

== Honors ==
Árabe Unido

- Primera División: 2012 Apertura, 2015 Clausura, 2015 Apertura, 2016 Apertura
