= Jean-Emmanuel Nédra =

Martiniquais footballer (born 1993)

Personal information
- Full name: Jean-Emmanuel Nédra
- Date of birth: March 11, 1993 (age 33)
- Place of birth: Le Lamentin, Martinique
- Position: Midfielder

Team information
- Current team: Golden Lion

Senior career*
Years	Team	Apps	(Gls)
–2012	US Marinoise		
2012–2014	Club Colonial		
2014–	Golden Lion		

International career
2012–	Martinique		
- * Club domestic league appearances and goals

Jean-Emmanuel Nédra (born 11 March 1993) is a professional footballer who plays as a midfielder for Golden Lion in the Martinique Championnat National and internationally for Martinique.

He made his debut for Martinique in 2012. He was in the Martinique Gold Cup squad for the 2017 tournament. He started in the defeat against Panama and the win against Nicaragua, also appearing as a substitute in the 3-2 defeat to the USA.

On 31 December 2022, Nédra and his girlfriend have been caught in Charles de Gaulle Airport, Paris carrying luggages filled with 50.7 kg and 53 kg of cocaine.
