= Oscar López (Nicaraguan footballer) =

Nicaraguan footballer

Óscar López
Personal information
- Full name: Oscar Renan López Pineda
- Date of birth: February 27, 1992 (age 34)
- Place of birth: Managua, Nicaragua
- Position: Defender

Team information
- Current team: Managua F.C.

Senior career*
Years	Team	Apps	(Gls)
2017	Managua F.C.		

International career^{‡}
2012–	Nicaragua	19	(0)
- * Club domestic league appearances and goals as of 2017 ‡ National team caps and goals as of 24 June 2019

Óscar Renan López (born 27 February 1992) is a Nicaraguan footballer who plays for Managua F.C.
