= Jhamir Ordain =

Costa Rican footballer (born 1993)

Personal information
- Full name: Jhamir Ordain Kareem Alexander
- Date of birth: 29 July 1993 (age 33)
- Position: Full back

Senior career*
Years	Team	Apps	(Gls)
2010-2017	Santos Guápiles	139	(0)
2017	C.S. Herediano	37	(0)
2018-2019	Municipal Grecia	27	(2)
2019-2020	Alajuelense	13	(1)
2020-2022	Pérez Zeledón	70	(3)
2022-	Santos Guápiles	103	(3)

International career^{‡}
2013	Costa Rica U20	7	(1)
2014	Costa Rica U21	1	(1)
2016	Costa Rica U23	2	(0)
2017	Costa Rica	2	(0)
- * Club domestic league appearances and goals as of 28 December 2025 ‡ National team caps and goals as of 13 November 2022

Jhamir Ordain Kareem Alexander (born July 29, 1993), commonly known as Jhamir Ordain, is a Costa Rican professional footballer who plays as a right-back for Santos de Guápiles F.C. in Costa Rica.

Having made his debut with Santos de Guapiles in 2010, Ordain was training with the Portland Timbers in January 2017. He scored in a pre-season match for the Oregon-based side. However, reports in Costa Rica said he was to be loaned back to Santos until the end of the season before being due to meet up with the Major League Soccer side at the end of the 2017 season to join up with compatriots Roy Miller and David Guzmán. Instead however, Ordain was signed by C.S. Herediano in May 2017.

== International career ==
Ordian received his first call up to the senior national team in 2016 for Costa Rica's friendly match against Russia. Ordain made his Costa Rica national team debut in the 2017 Copa Centroamericana playing in 3–0 win over Belize. He also played in a 0–0 draw against Nicaragua.
