= Jorge García (footballer, born 1998) =

Nicaraguan footballer

Personal information
- Full name: Jorge García Hurtado
- Date of birth: 27 August 1998 (age 28)
- Place of birth: Managua, Nicaragua
- Height: 1.75 m (5 ft 9 in)
- Position: Forward

Team information
- Current team: Walter Ferretti

Senior career*
| Years | Team | Apps | (Gls) |
| 2016– | Walter Ferretti | 36 | (10) |

International career^{‡}
| 2017– | Nicaragua | 7 | (1) |
- * Club domestic league appearances and goals as of 27 June 2017 ‡ National team caps and goals as of 26 July 2017

Jorge García Hurtado (born 27 August 1998) is a professional Nicaraguan football forward currently playing for Walter Ferretti in the Nicaraguan Primera División.

García was included in the Nicaragua national football team that played in the 2017 CONCACAF Gold Cup.
