= Antoine Jean-Baptiste =

French footballer (born 1991)

Personal information
- Full name: Antoine Jean-Baptiste
- Date of birth: January 20, 1991 (age 35)
- Place of birth: Longjumeau, France
- Height: 1.75 m (5 ft 9 in)
- Position: Defender

Team information
- Current team: FC Vaulx-en-Velin

Youth career
- –: FC Longjumeau
- –2005: US Palaiseau
- 2005–2009: Rennes

Senior career*
Years	Team	Apps	(Gls)
2009–2013	Amiens SC		
2013–2014	Aurillac Arpajon	24	(5)
2014–2015	Luçon FC	17	(0)
2015–2016	MDA Chasselay	25	(3)
2016–2017	FC Villefranche	36	(0)
2018–2019	MDA Chasselay	28	(1)
2019–	FC Vaulx-en-Velin	7	(1)

International career
2014–	Martinique	16	(2)
- * Club domestic league appearances and goals as of 15:40, 28 October 2019 (UTC)

Antoine Jean-Baptiste (born 20 January 1991) is a professional footballer who plays as a defender for FC Vaulx-en-Velin in the French Championnat National 3 and internationally for Martinique.

== Career ==
He made his debut for Martinique in 2014. He was in the Martinique Gold Cup squads for the 2017 tournaments.
