= Henry Niño =

Nicaraguan footballer (born 1997)

Personal information
- Full name: Henry Niño Gómez
- Date of birth: 3 October 1997 (age 29)
- Place of birth: León, Nicaragua
- Height: 1.72 m (5 ft 8 in)
- Position: Defender

Team information
- Current team: Real Estelí
- Number: 3

Senior career*
Years	Team	Apps	(Gls)
2017-2018	Diriangén FC		
2019-2020	Walter Ferretti		
2020	Diriangén FC		
2021	Walter Ferretti		
2021	Diriangén FC		
2021	Ocotal		
2022	Walter Ferretti		
2022	Chalatenango		
2023-2024	Managua		
2024-Present	Real Estelí		

International career^{‡}
2017–Present	Nicaragua	30	(1)
- * Club domestic league appearances and goals ‡ National team caps and goals as of 11 September 2018

Henry Niño Gómez (born 3 October 1997) is a Nicaraguan professional footballer who plays as a defender for Liga Primera club Real Estelí and the Nicaragua national team.

== International career ==
He played for Nicaragua at the 2017 CONCACAF Gold Cup.

=== International goals ===
Scores and results list Nicaragua's goal tally first.

No.	Date	Venue	Opponent	Score	Result	Competition
1.	8 September 2018	Arnos Vale Stadium, Arnos Vale, Saint Vincent and the Grenadines	Saint Vincent and the Grenadines	1–0	2–0	2019–20 CONCACAF Nations League qualification
