= Eulises Pavón =

Nicaraguan footballer

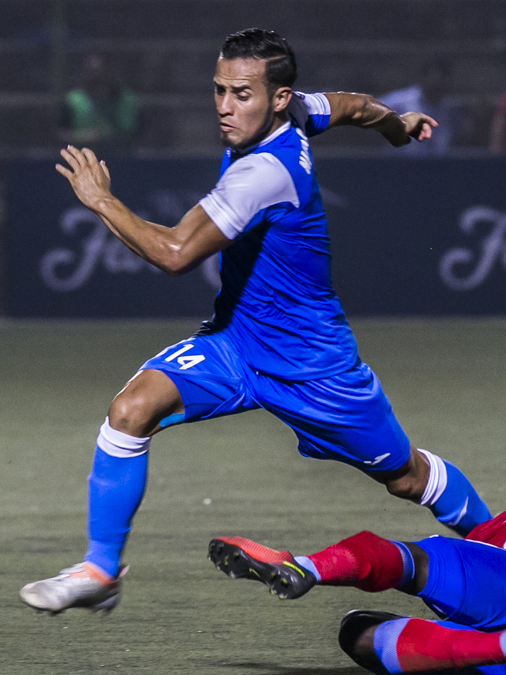
- Pavón with Nicaragua

Personal information
- Full name: Eulises Ezequiel Pavón Alvarado
- Date of birth: 6 January 1993 (age 33)
- Place of birth: Diriamba, Nicaragua
- Height: 1.72 m (5 ft 8 in)
- Position: Forward

Team information
- Current team: Estudiantes de Caracas
- Number: 9

Senior career*
Years	Team	Apps	(Gls)
2010–2015	Diriangén FC	67	(22)
2015–2016	Deportivo Walter Ferretti	19	(5)
2016–2017	C.D. Suchitepéquez		
2018-Today	Estudiantes de Caracas		

International career^{‡}
- Nicaragua U17
- Nicaragua U20
2014–	Nicaragua	21	(2)
- * Club domestic league appearances and goals as of 2017 ‡ National team caps and goals as of 26 July 2017

Eulises Pavón (born 6 January 1993) is a Nicaraguan professional footballer who plays as a forward for Estudiantes de Caracas in Venezuela.
