= Ángel Patrick =

Panamanian footballer (born 1992)

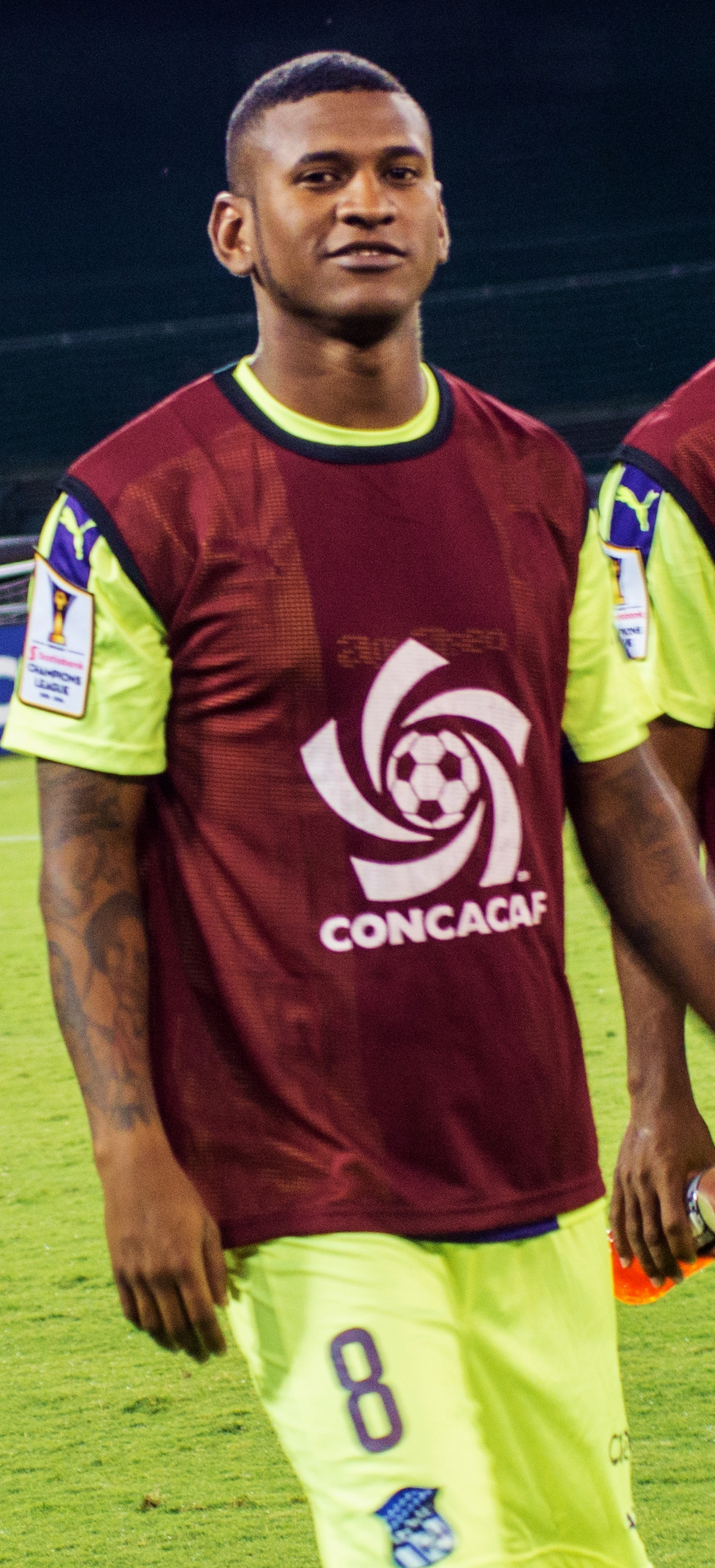
- Patrick in 2015

Personal information
- Full name: Ángel Rogelio Patrick Garth
- Date of birth: February 27, 1992 (age 34)
- Place of birth: Colón, Panama
- Position: Right-back

Senior career*
Years	Team	Apps	(Gls)
2010–2019	Árabe Unido	163	(2)
2017	→ Cafetaleros de Tapachula (loan)	3	(0)
Total		165	(2)

International career
2014–2017	Panama	5	(0)
- * Club domestic league appearances and goals

Ángel Rogelio Patrick Garth (born February 27, 1992) is a Panamanian former professional footballer who played as a right-back.

== Club career ==
Patrick played club football for Árabe Unido.

== International career ==
Patrick earned his first cap for the Panama national team against Nicaragua in the 2014 Copa Centroamericana where he came on as a substitute. He was called up for the 2015 CONCACAF Gold Cup as a replacement for Roberto Chen.

== Honours ==
Panama

- CONCACAF Gold Cup third place: 2015
