= Maykel Montiel =

Nicaraguan footballer

Personal information
- Full name: Maykel Montiel
- Date of birth: January 27, 1990 (age 36)
- Place of birth: Managua, Nicaragua
- Position: Midfielder

Team information
- Current team: Matagalpa

Senior career*
Years	Team	Apps	(Gls)
2015–2018	UNAN Managua	93	(6)
2018–2019	Walter Ferretti	19	(2)
2019–2020	Juventus FC	25	(1)
2020–2021	Municipal Jalapa	24	(0)
2022	Export Sébaco	14	(2)
2022–	Matagalpa	49	(4)

International career
2012–2018	Nicaragua	9	(0)
- * Club domestic league appearances and goals as of 17:21, 8 June 2024 (UTC)

Maykel Montiel (born 27 January 1990) is a Nicaraguan footballer who plays for UNAN Managua.

In January 2024, Montiel was one of twelve players temporarily sanctioned by the Nicaraguan Football Federation while it investigated match-fixing allegations. This meant that Montiel was not allowed to train or play matches for an indefinite period.
