= Kévin Olimpa =

Martiniquais footballer (born 1988)

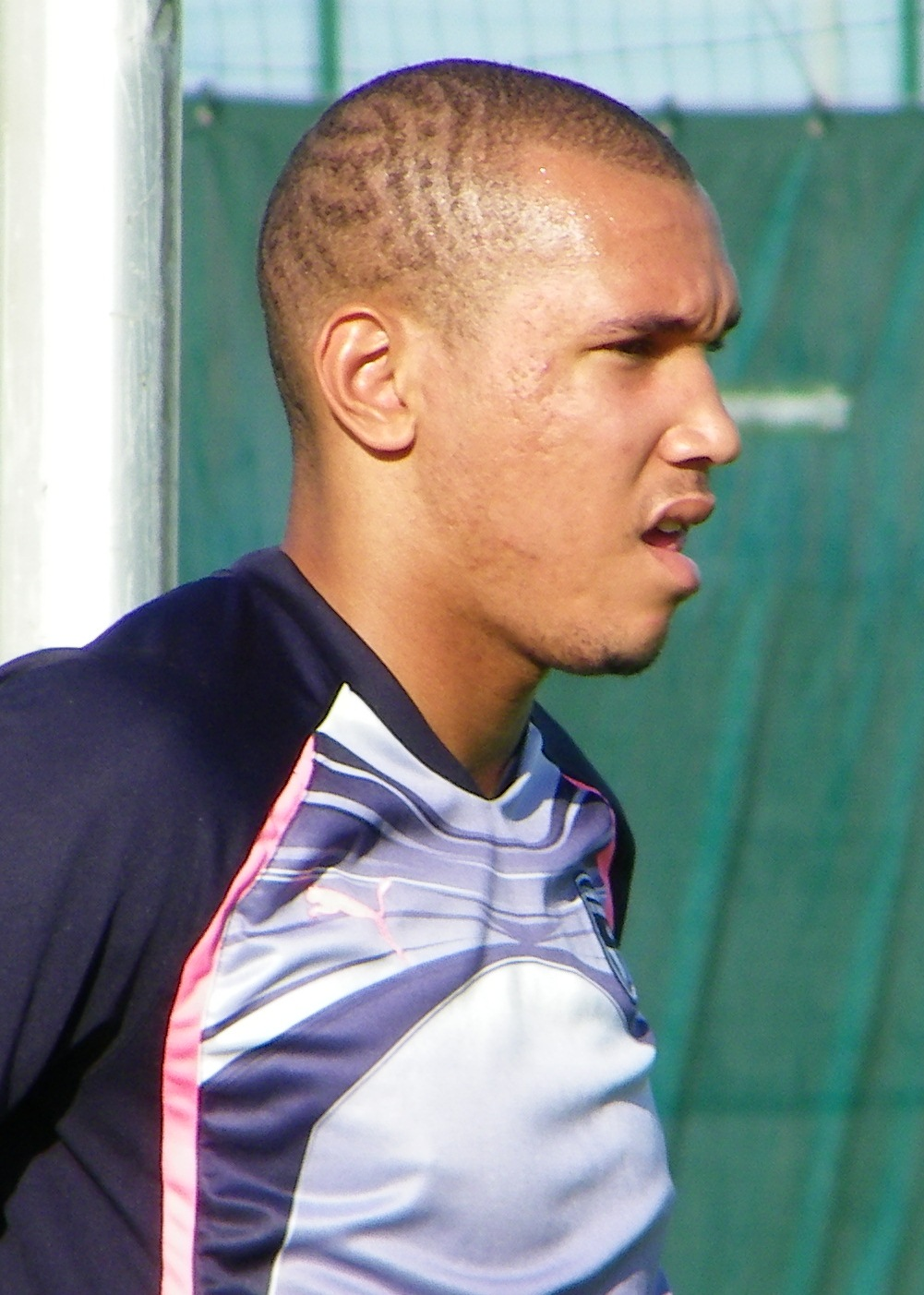
- Olimpa in 2010

Personal information
- Full name: Kévin Jacques Olimpa
- Date of birth: 10 March 1988 (age 38)
- Place of birth: Paris, France
- Height: 1.86 m (6 ft 1 in)
- Position: Goalkeeper

Youth career
- –2003: CSF Brétigny
- 2001–2004: INF Clairefontaine
- 2005–2006: Bordeaux

Senior career*
Years	Team	Apps	(Gls)
2006–2014	Bordeaux	4	(0)
2009–2010	→ Angers (loan)	19	(0)
2014–2016	Platanias	35	(0)
2018	Espace Foot		
2019	Sant Julià	4	(0)

International career
2009	France U21	6	(0)
2012–2017	Martinique	18	(0)
- * Club domestic league appearances and goals

Kévin Olimpa (born 10 March 1988) is a Martiniquais retired professional footballer, who played as a goalkeeper.

== Career ==
Olimpa previously played for French side Bordeaux. He made his debut for the side on 8 November 2008, coming on in the 43rd minute to replace injured starter Mathieu Valverde in Bordeaux's 2–0 win over AJ Auxerre.

In November 2016, he agreed the termination of his contract with Super League Greece side Platanias F.C.

In December 2018, he moved to French lower-league club Espace Foot Bordeaux-Mérignac.

In January 2019, Olimpa joined Andorran side Sant Julià.

== Honours ==
Bordeaux

- Ligue 1: 2008–09
- Coupe de France: 2012–13
