= Álex Rodríguez (Panamanian footballer) =

Panamanian footballer (born 1990)

Personal information
- Full name: Álex Raúl Rodríguez Ledezma
- Date of birth: 5 August 1990 (age 36)
- Place of birth: Panama City, Panama
- Height: 1.95 m (6 ft 5 in)
- Position: Goalkeeper

Team information
- Current team: Independiente
- Number: 1

Youth career
- –2012: Sporting San Miguelito

Senior career*
Years	Team	Apps	(Gls)
2012–2015	Sporting San Miguelito	64	(0)
2015–2016	San Francisco	26	(0)
2016	Pérez Zeledón	11	(0)
2017–2019	San Francisco	52	(0)
2019	San Carlos	0	(0)
2019–2021	Sporting San Miguelito	59	(0)
2022	Atlético Chiriquí	17	(0)
2023–2025	Tauro	36	(0)
2025–	Independiente	0	(0)

International career^{‡}
2013–2022	Panama	7	(0)
- * Club domestic league appearances and goals as of 24 August 2023 ‡ National team caps and goals as of 18 May 2018

Álex Raúl Rodríguez Ledezma (born 5 August 1990) is a Panamanian professional footballer who plays as a goalkeeper for LPF club Independiente.

== Club career ==
The tall Rodríguez joined San Francisco from Sporting San Miguelito in summer 2015.

Rodríguez joined San Carlos on 30 January 2019.

== International career ==
He made his debut for Panama in a January 2013 friendly match against Guatemala and has, as of 1 August 2015, earned a total of 2 caps, scoring no goals. He was a non-playing squad member at the 2013 CONCACAF Gold Cup.

In May 2018, he was named in Panama's preliminary 35-man squad for the 2018 FIFA World Cup in Russia, and was later named as a reserve goalkeeper in the final 23-man squad behind starter Jaime Penedo.

== Career statistics ==
=== International ===
As of 11 June 2022

Panama
Year	Apps	Goals
2013	2	0
2014	0	0
2015	0	0
2016	3	0
2017	1	0
2018	0	0
2022	1	0
Total	7	0

== Honours ==
Panama

- CONCACAF Gold Cup runner-up: 2013
