= Luis Copete =

Footballer (born 1989)

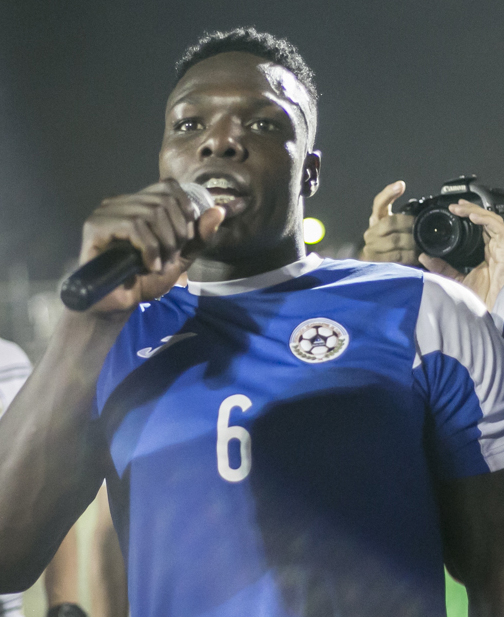
- Copete with Nicaragua in 2017

Personal information
- Full name: Luis Fernando Copete Murillo
- Date of birth: 12 February 1989 (age 37)
- Place of birth: Istmina, Colombia
- Height: 1.83 m (6 ft 0 in)
- Position: Centre-back

Team information
- Current team: Diriangén
- Number: 27

Senior career*
Years	Team	Apps	(Gls)
2009	La Equidad		
2013–2016	Walter Ferretti	64	(8)
2015	→ Puma Generaleña (loan)	15	(0)
2016–2017	Real Estelí	20	(2)
2017	Comerciantes Unidos	14	(1)
2017–2018	Real Estelí	3	(0)
2018	Sonsonate FC	20	(1)
2018	Deportivo Pasto	10	(1)
2019–2020	Always Ready	31	(2)
2020–2021	Once Deportivo	3	(1)
2021	Independiente Petrolero	0	(0)
2021	Isidro Metapán	4	(0)
2021–2022	Juventus Managua	18	(2)
2022–	Diriangén	29	(4)

International career^{‡}
2014–2023	Nicaragua	39	(3)
- * Club domestic league appearances and goals as of 20 May 2023 ‡ National team caps and goals as of 27 March 2023

Luis Fernando Copete Murillo (born 12 February 1989) is a professional footballer who plays as a centre-back for Liga Primera club Diriangén. Born in Colombia, he represents the Nicaragua national team.

== Club career ==
=== Puma Generaleña ===
In 2015, Copete and his then Nicaragua national teammate Raúl Leguías joined Costa Rican side AS Puma.

Copete went on trial with Kazakhstan Premier League side FC Shakhter Karagandy in early 2016, but did not earn a contract.

=== Sonsonate ===
Copete signed with top flight Primera División side Sonsonate for Clausura 2018 tournament.

On 29 March 2018, Copete scored his debut goal for Sonsonate in a 3–1 victory against Isidro Metapán in the Estadio Anna Mercedes Campos.

=== Deportivo Pasto ===
In July 2018, Copete signed with Deportivo Pasto.

== International career ==
Copete became a naturalised citizen of Nicaragua in 2014. According La Prensa, he did not comply with the Nationality Law No. 149 at the moment of his naturalisation. He received his first call-up to the Nicaragua national football team a year later.

He was a squad member for the 2017 Copa Centroamericana and the 2017 CONCACAF Gold Cup.

== Career statistics ==
Scores and results list the Nicaragua's goal tally first.

#	Date	Venue	Opponent	Score	Result	Competition
1.	23 March 2015	Nicaragua National Football Stadium, Managua, Nicaragua	Anguilla	2–0	5–0	2018 FIFA World Cup qualification
2.	23 March 2015	Nicaragua National Football Stadium, Managua, Nicaragua	Anguilla	4–0	5–0	2018 FIFA World Cup qualification
3.	10 March 2016	Nicaragua National Football Stadium, Managua, Nicaragua	El Salvador	1–0	1–1	Friendly
