= Marlon López =

Nicaraguan footballer

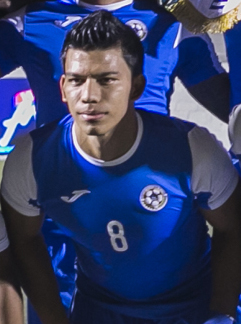
- López with Nicaragua in 2017

Personal information
- Full name: Marlon Andres López Moreno
- Date of birth: November 2, 1992 (age 33)
- Place of birth: Managua, Nicaragua
- Height: 1.75 m (5 ft 9 in)
- Position: Defensive midfielder

Team information
- Current team: Real Estelí
- Number: 21

Senior career*
Years	Team	Apps	(Gls)
2013–2015	Managua F.C.	55	(16)
2016	→ Santos de Guápiles (Loan)	4	(1)
2016–	Real Estelí	116	(7)

International career^{‡}
- Nicaragua U17
- Nicaragua U20
2014–	Nicaragua	39	(0)
- * Club domestic league appearances and goals as of 15:01, 23 January 2017 (UTC) ‡ National team caps and goals as of 22 June 2019

Marlon Andrés López Moreno (born 2 November 1992) is a Nicaraguan professional footballer who plays as a defensive midfielder for Liga Primera club Real Estelí.
