= Luis Ovalle =

Panamanian footballer (born 1988)

- Ovalle playing for Panama at the 2018 FIFA World Cup

Personal information
- Full name: Luis Carlos Ovalle Victoria
- Date of birth: 7 September 1988 (age 38)
- Place of birth: Panama City, Panama
- Height: 1.78 m (5 ft 10 in)
- Position: Left-back

Youth career
- Sporting San Miguelito

Senior career*
Years	Team	Apps	(Gls)
2005–2008	Sporting San Miguelito	57	(11)
2008	→ Monterrey B (loan)	22	(0)
2009–2010	Chorrillo	32	(0)
2010–2012	Sporting San Miguelito	21	(0)
2012	→ Patriotas (loan)	2	(0)
2013–2017	Zamora	136	(3)
2017	Deportes Tolima	6	(0)
2018	Olimpia	13	(0)
2018	Sporting San Miguelito	10	(0)
2019	Atlético Venezuela	14	(0)
2019	Deportivo Táchira	21	(0)
2020	Plaza Amador	5	(0)
2020–2021	Tauro	13	(0)
2021–2022	San Francisco	10	(0)
2022	Deportivo La Guaira	23	(0)
2024	Sporting San Miguelito	5	(0)

International career
2010–2019	Panama	27	(0)
- * Club domestic league appearances and goals as of 17:52, 11 May 2020 (UTC)

Luis Carlos Ovalle Victoria (born 7 September 1988) is a Panamanian former footballer who played as a left-back.

== Club career ==
Ovalle came through the Sporting San Miguelito youth system and made his debut for their senior side in 2004. In 2008, he joined compatriot Felipe Baloy at Mexican side Monterrey only to return to Panama to play for Chorrillo and later for Sporting San Miguelito again. In June 2012, Sporting loaned him to Colombian club Patriotas Boyaca.

In January 2013, Ovalle crossed borders again when he joined compatriot Gabriel Torres at Venezuelan outfit Zamora.

== International career ==
He was part of the Panama U-20 squad that participated in the 2007 FIFA World Youth Cup in Canada.

Ovalle made his senior debut for Panama in a December 2010 friendly match against Honduras and has, as of 10 June 2015, earned a total of four caps, scoring no goals.

In May 2018, he was named in Panama's 23 man squad for the 2018 FIFA World Cup in Russia.

== Career statistics ==
=== International ===
As of 28 June 2018

Panama
Year	Apps	Goals
2010	1	0
2011	0	0
2012	2	0
2013	0	0
2014	0	0
2015	1	0
2016	5	0
2017	13	0
2018	3	0
Total	25	0
