= Justo Lorente =

Nicaraguan footballer

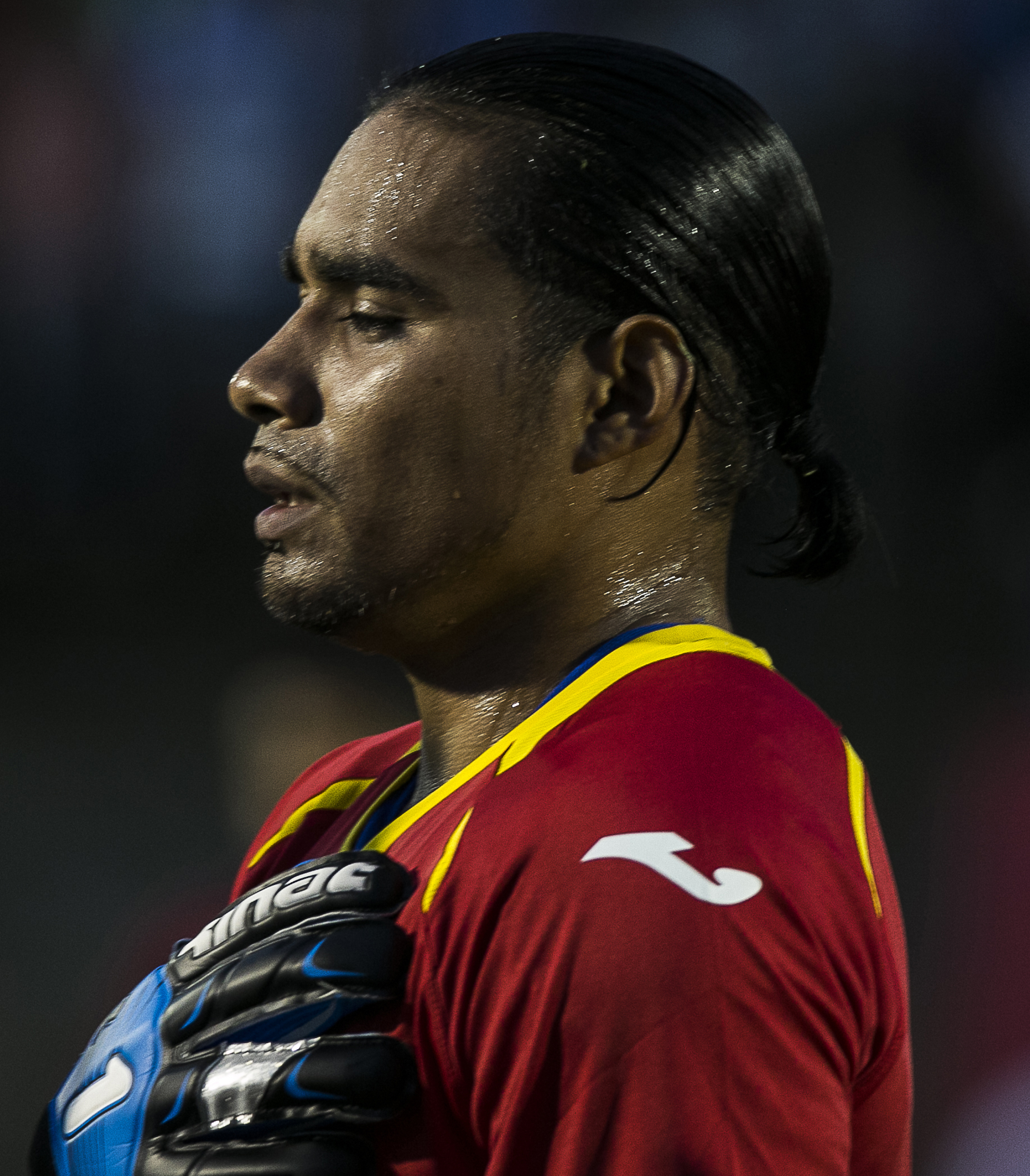
- Lorente with Nicaragua

Personal information
- Full name: Justo Lorente Collado
- Date of birth: February 27, 1984 (age 42)
- Place of birth: Masaya, Nicaragua
- Height: 1.77 m (5 ft 10 in)
- Position: Goalkeeper

Senior career*
Years	Team	Apps	(Gls)
2011–2017	Real Estelí	124	(0)
2016	→ Municipal Liberia (loan)	10	(0)
2017–2018	UNAN Managua	24	(0)
2018–2019	Managua	21	(0)
2019–2020	Juventus Managua	26	(0)
2020–2022	Diriangén FC	80	(0)
2023	Deportivo Ocotal	14	(0)

International career
2013–2021	Nicaragua	32	(0)
- * Club domestic league appearances and goals

Justo Lorente Collado (born 27 February 1984) is a retired Nicaraguan footballer, who played as a goalkeeper.
