= Erick Téllez =

Nicaraguan footballer

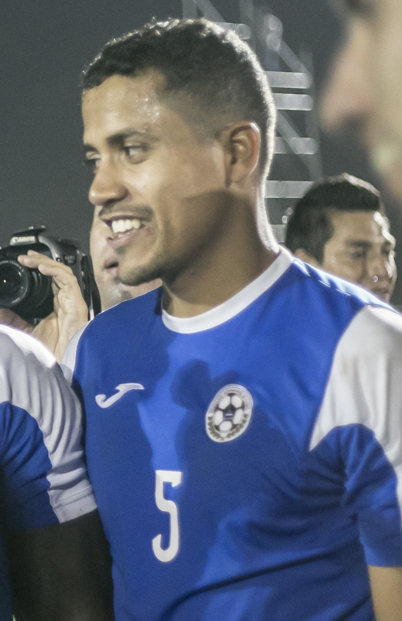

Personal information
- Full name: Erick José Téllez Fonseca
- Date of birth: January 28, 1989 (age 37)
- Place of birth: Managua, Nicaragua
- Height: 1.72 m (5 ft 7 1/2 in)
- Position: Defender

Team information
- Current team: Diriangén
- Number: 5

Senior career*
Years	Team	Apps	(Gls)
2008–	Diriangén	85	(7)

International career^{‡}
2010–	Nicaragua	26	(0)
- * Club domestic league appearances and goals as of 23:48, 21 February 2012 (UTC) ‡ National team caps and goals as of 26 July 2017

Erick José Téllez Fonseca (born January 28, 1989) is a Nicaraguan professional footballer who plays as a defender for Liga Primera club Diriangén and the Nicaragua national team.

== Club career ==
Téllez has been with Diriangén for his entire career. In September 2013 he was suspended for 6 matches for his part in a mass brawl in a game against rivals Real Estelí.

== International career ==
Téllez made his debut for Nicaragua in a September 2010 friendly match against Guatemala and has, as of July 2017, earned a total of 26 caps, scoring no goals. He has represented his country at the 2011 Copa Centroamericana.
