= Bismarck Veliz =

Nicaraguan footballer

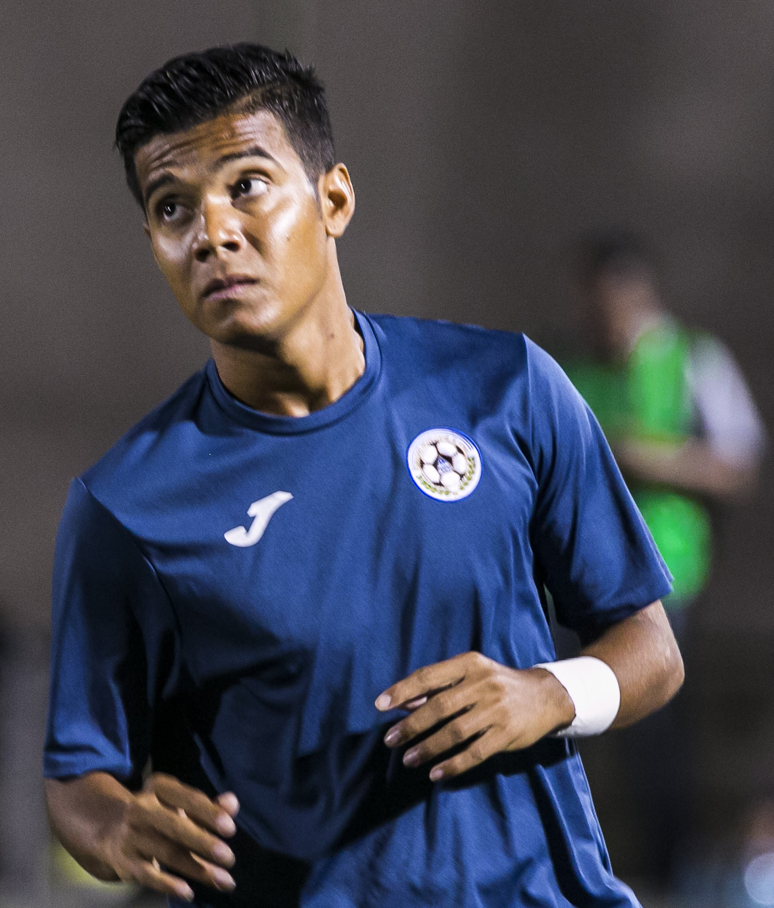

Personal information
- Full name: Bismarck Antonio Veliz Gómez
- Date of birth: September 10, 1993 (age 33)
- Place of birth: Chinandega, Nicaragua
- Position: Defender

Team information
- Current team: Municipal Jalapa
- Number: 16

Senior career*
Years	Team	Apps	(Gls)
2014	Chinandega	30	(4)
2015	Deportivo Ocotal	15	(3)
2016	Juventus Managua	32	(2)
2017	Chinandega	32	(2)
2017–2018	Managua	34	(5)
2018	Real Estelí	2	(0)
2019	Managua	1	(0)
2020–2021	Municipal Jalapa	25	(1)
2021–2022	Sport Sébaco	32	(4)
2023–	Municipal Jalapa	6	(0)

International career^{‡}
2014–	Nicaragua	13	(0)
- * Club domestic league appearances and goals as of 18:57, 25 October 2023 (UTC) ‡ National team caps and goals as of 26 July 2017

Bismarck Veliz (born 10 September 1993) is a Nicaraguan footballer who plays for Municipal Jalapa.
