= Daniel Cadena =

Footballer (born 1987)

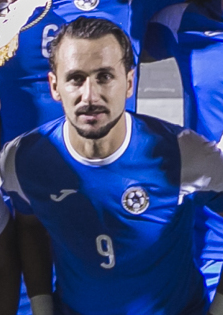
- Cadena with Nicaragua in 2017

Personal information
- Full name: Daniel Cadena Sánchez
- Date of birth: 9 February 1987 (age 39)
- Place of birth: Sanlúcar de Barrameda, Spain
- Height: 1.77 m (5 ft 10 in)
- Position: Forward

Team information
- Current team: UNAN Managua
- Number: 25

Youth career
- 2004–2006: Sanluqueño

Senior career*
Years	Team	Apps	(Gls)
2006–2007	Sanluqueño	0	
2007–2008	Betis B	8	
2008–2009	Betis C	10	(3)
2009	Xerez B	7	(5)
2010	Racing Portuense	15	(1)
2011	Rota		
2011–2012	Atlético Antoniano		
2012–2013	Algaida	24	(21)
2013–2016	Walter Ferretti	89	(44)
2016	Atletico Antoniano	2	(0)
2016	Atlántico		
2016	KF	9	(0)
2017	Njarðvík	3	(0)
2017–2018	Real Estelí	13	(3)
2018–2019	Mérida	7	(1)
2019–2020	Arcos	3	(0)
2020–2021	Deportivo Ocotal	15	(4)
2021–2022	Juventus Managua	28	(9)
2022	Rayo Sanluqueño	4	(0)
2023–	UNAN Managua	13	(0)

International career^{‡}
2014–2021	Nicaragua	33	(4)
- * Club domestic league appearances and goals as of 15 April 2023 ‡ National team caps and goals as of 21 February 2021

Daniel Cadena Sanchez (born 9 February 1987) is a footballer who plays as a forward for Liga Primera de Nicaragua club UNAN Managua.

Born and raised in Spain to Spanish parents, Cadena has played in the Nicaraguan league and subsequently capped for the Nicaragua national team.

== Club career ==
Cadena has spent most of his playing career in Spain but he has also played club football in Nicaragua.

== International career ==
Having arrived to Nicaragua in 2013 to play for Ferretti, Cadena became a naturalized citizen just a year later, in 2014. According La Prensa, he did not comply with the Nationality Law No. 149 at the moment of his naturalization. By debuting for Nicaragua that very 2014, he also failed with the FIFA eligibility rules.

== Career statistics ==
Scores and results list Nicaragua's goal tally first.

Goal	Date	Venue	Opponent	Score	Result	Competition
1.	27 December 2016	Nicaragua National Football Stadium, Managua, Nicaragua	Trinidad and Tobago	2–0	2–1	Friendly
2.	30 December 2016	Nicaragua National Football Stadium, Managua, Nicaragua	Trinidad and Tobago	1–0	1–3	Friendly
3.	20 January 2017	Estadio Rommel Fernández, Panama City, Panama	Belize	2–1	3–1	2017 Copa Centroamericana
