= Cyril Errington =

Salvadoran–Nicaraguan footballer (born 1992)

Personal information
- Full name: Cyril Alexander Errington Rodríguez
- Date of birth: March 30, 1992 (age 34)
- Place of birth: San Salvador, El Salvador
- Height: 1.75 m (5 ft 9 in)

Youth career
- 2008–2010: Nejapa FC (reserves)

Senior career*
Years	Team	Apps	(Gls)
2010–2012	Vendaval Apopa		
2012	Alianza (reserves)		
2013–2014	Alianza	7	(0)
2015	→ Pasaquina (loan)	7	(0)
2015	→ Real Destroyer (loan)		
2015	Dragón	5	(0)
2016	UES	22	(0)
2017	Real Estelí	7	(0)
2017	Managua FC	13	(0)
2018	Club Always Ready		
2018–2019	Santa Tecla FC		
2019	C.D. Luis Ángel Firpo		
2020	Diriangén FC		

International career^{‡}
2016–	Nicaragua	11	(0)
- * Club domestic league appearances and goals as of 17 February 2019 ‡ National team caps and goals as of 21 June 2019

Cyril Alexander Errington Rodríguez (born 30 March 1992) is a Salvadoran-born Nicaraguan professional footballer who plays as a defender for the Nicaragua national team.

His father is Nicaraguan and his mother is Salvadoran.
