= Bryan García (Nicaraguan footballer) =

Nicaraguan footballer

Personal information
- Full name: Bryan Antonio García Sirias
- Date of birth: 25 May 1995 (age 31)
- Place of birth: Granada, Nicaragua
- Position: Winger

Team information
- Current team: C.D. Walter Ferretti
- Number: 18

Youth career
- Managua

Senior career*
Years	Team	Apps	(Gls)
2013–2016	Managua	96	(23)
2016–2018	Real Estelí	48	(6)
2018–2019	Managua	33	(10)
2019–	C.D. Walter Ferretti	38	(5)

International career^{‡}
2015–	Nicaragua	22	(3)
- * Club domestic league appearances and goals as of 21 January 2017 ‡ National team caps and goals as of 26 July 2017

Bryan Antonio García Sirias (born 25 May 1995) is a Nicaraguan professional footballer who plays as a winger for the Real Estelí F.C.

== International career ==
=== International goals ===
Scores and results list Nicaragua's goal tally first.

Goal	Date	Venue	Opponent	Score	Result	Competition
1.	11 December 2015	Estadio Independencia, Estelí, Nicaragua	Cuba	1–0	1–0	Friendly
2.	15 January 2017	Estadio Rommel Fernández, Panama City, Panama	Panama	1–2	1–2	2017 Copa Centroamericana
3.	20 January 2017	Estadio Rommel Fernández, Panama City, Panama	Belize	3–1	3–1	2017 Copa Centroamericana
