= Henry Duarte =

Costa Rican association football coach

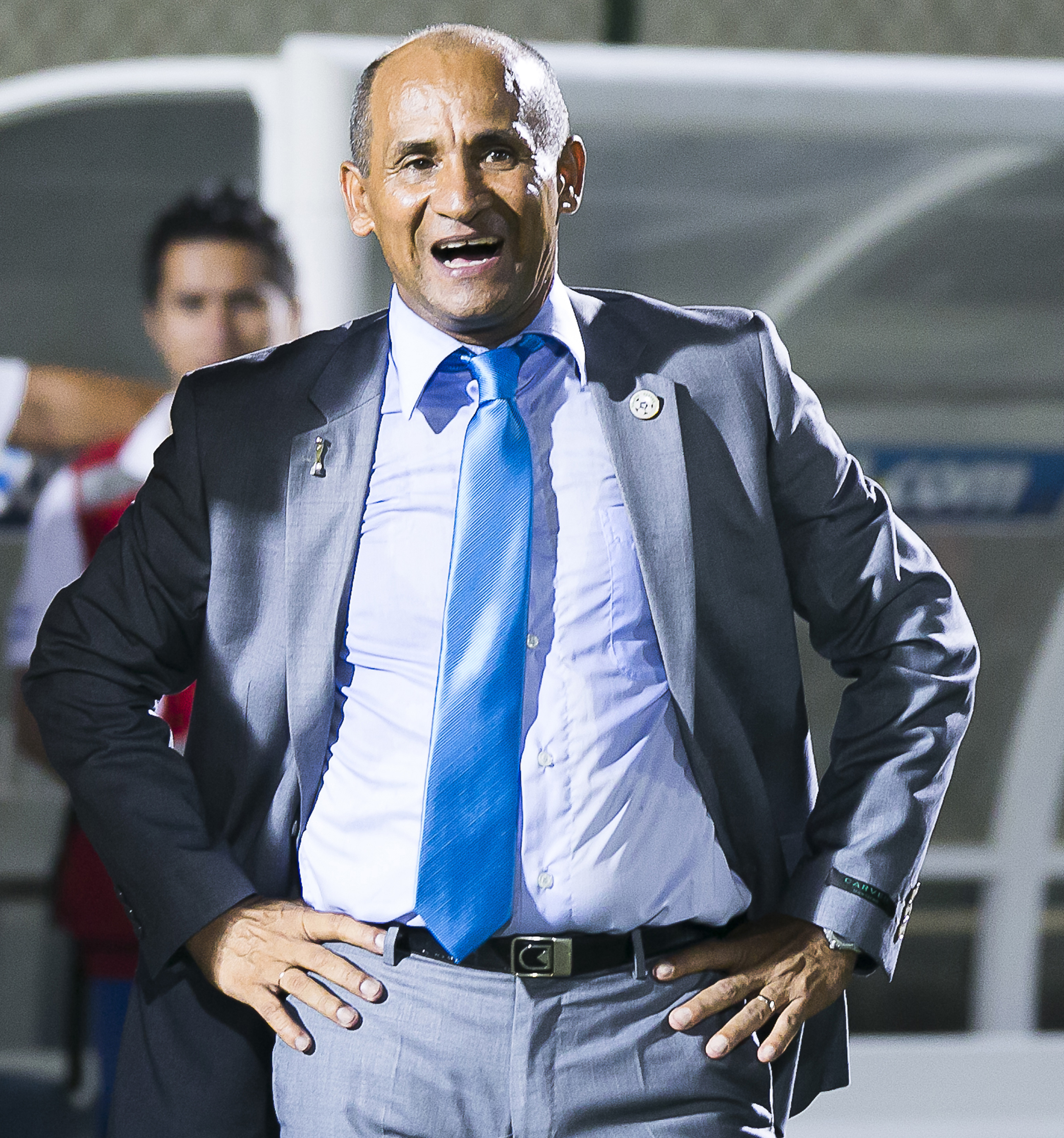
- Duarte in 2015

Personal information
- Full name: Henry Duarte Molina
- Date of birth: 5 October 1958 (age 68)
- Place of birth: Liberia, Costa Rica

Managerial career
- Years: Team
- 1992–1993: Costa Rica (juvenil)
- 1994: Costa Rica U-23
- 1994: Limonense
- 1995–1996: Puntarenas
- 1996–1997: Pérez Zeledón
- 1997–1998: Herediano
- 2000: Pérez Zeledón
- 2000: UCR
- 2001: Guanacasteca
- 2004: Liberia
- 2005: UCR
- 1991: Cartaginés
- 2006–2007: Carmelita
- 2010–2011: Santos de Guápiles
- 2002–2003: San Carlos
- 2009–2011: Maccabi Netanya (assistant)
- 2014–2020: Nicaragua
- 2020–2021: Marineros
- 2021–2023: Puntarenas (sporting director)

Henry Duarte Molina (born 5 October 1958) is a Costa Rican football coach.

== Managerial career ==
Duarte has FIFA instructor and coaches several Costa Rican Primera División clubs, with him taking charge of Herediano, one of the country's Big Four, in 1997 as one of his major jobs.

Duarte was named manager of Nicaragua in December 2014.

=== Managerial statistics ===
As of 8 November 2023

Team	From	To	Record				
Team	From	To	G	W	D	L	Win %
Nicaragua	December 2014	June 2020	54	17	10	27	31.48
