= Luis Peralta (Nicaraguan footballer) =

Nicaraguan footballer (born 1988)

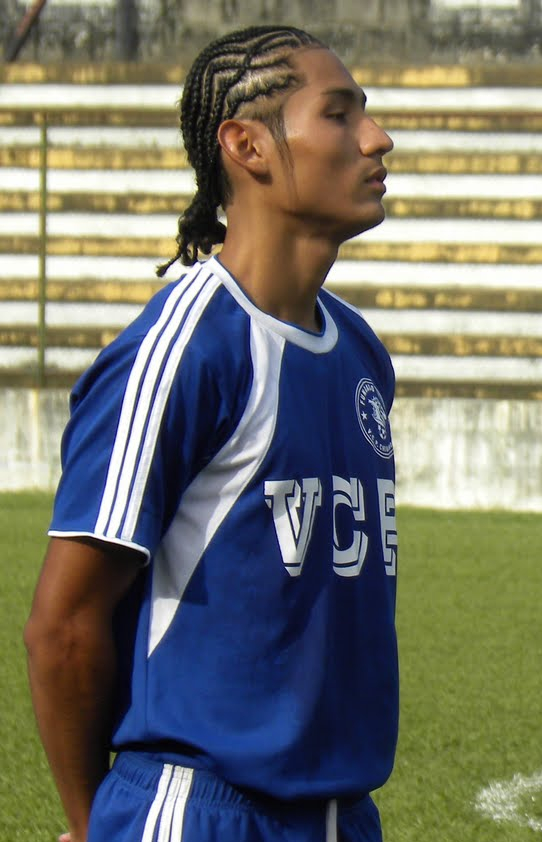
- Peralta for VCP in 2008

Personal information
- Full name: Luis Ángel Peralta Ramírez
- Date of birth: 12 October 1988 (age 38)
- Place of birth: Chinandega, Nicaragua
- Position: Midfielder

Team information
- Current team: Deportivo Walter Ferretti

Senior career*
Years	Team	Apps	(Gls)
2008–2010	VCP Chinandega		
2010–2015	Diriangen FC		
2015–	Deportivo Walter Ferretti		

International career^{‡}
2014–	Nicaragua	19	(1)
- * Club domestic league appearances and goals as of 2017 ‡ National team caps and goals as of 26 July 2017

Luis Ángel Peralta Ramírez (born October 12, 1988) is a Nicaraguan footballer who plays for Deportivo Walter Ferretti.
