= 2017 in American soccer =

Soccer in the United States
- Season: 2017

Men's soccer
- Supporters' Shield: (Canada) Toronto FC
- USL: Louisville City FC
- NASL: San Francisco Deltas
- NPSL: Elm City Express
- PDL: Charlotte Eagles
- US Open Cup: Sporting Kansas City
- MLS Cup: (Canada) Toronto FC

Women's soccer
- NWSL: Portland Thorns FC
- WPSL: Fire & Ice SC
- UWS: Grand Rapids FC

The 2017 season was the 105th season of competitive soccer in the United States.

== National teams ==
=== Men's ===
==== Senior ====
Wins	Losses	Draws
10	2	7

===== Results and fixtures =====
====== Friendlies ======
January 29	United States	0–0	Serbia	San Diego, California
16:00 ET		Report		Stadium: Qualcomm Stadium; Attendance: 20,079; Referee: Kevin Morrison (Jamaica)

February 3	United States	1–0	Jamaica	Chattanooga, Tennessee
19:00 ET	Morris 59'	Report		Stadium: Finley Stadium; Attendance: 17,903; Referee: Jafeth Perea (Panama)

June 3	United States	1–1	Venezuela	Sandy, Utah
22:00 ET	Pulisic 61'	Report	Velázquez 29'	Stadium: Rio Tinto Stadium; Attendance: 17,315; Referee: Jeffrey Solis (Costa Rica)

July 1	United States	2–1	Ghana	East Hartford, Connecticut
16:45 ET	Dwyer 19'; Acosta 52'	Report	Gyan 60'	Stadium: Rentschler Field; Attendance: 28,754; Referee: Ismael Cornejo (El Salvador)

November 14	Portugal	1–1	United States	Leiria, Portugal
15:45 ET	Antunes 31'	Report	McKennie 21'	Stadium: Estádio Dr. Magalhães Pessoa; Attendance: 19,107; Referee: Anthony Taylor (England)

====== Fifth round ======
Pos	Team	Pld	W	D	L	GF	GA	GD	Pts	Qualification	(Mexico)	(Costa Rica)	(Panama)	(Honduras)	(United States)	(Trinidad and Tobago)
1	Mexico	10	6	3	1	16	7	+9	21	Qualification to 2018 FIFA World Cup	—	2–0	1–0	3–0	1–1	3–1
2	Costa Rica	10	4	4	2	14	8	+6	16	Qualification to 2018 FIFA World Cup	1–1	—	0–0	1–1	4–0	2–1
3	Panama	10	3	4	3	9	10	−1	13	Qualification to 2018 FIFA World Cup	0–0	2–1	—	2–2	1–1	3–0
4	Honduras	10	3	4	3	13	19	−6	13	Advance to inter-confederation play-offs	3–2	1–1	0–1	—	1–1	3–1
5	United States	10	3	3	4	17	13	+4	12		1–2	0–2	4–0	6–0	—	2–0
6	Trinidad and Tobago	10	2	0	8	7	19	−12	6		0–1	0–2	1–0	1–2	2–1	—

Source: FIFA
Rules for classification: Qualification tiebreakers

March 24 Fifth round	United States	6–0	Honduras	San Jose, California
20:30 ET	Lletget 5'; Bradley 27'; Dempsey 32', 49', 54'; Pulisic 46'	Report		Stadium: Avaya Stadium; Attendance: 17,729; Referee: Walter López Castellanos (Guatemala)

March 28 Fifth round	Panama	1–1	United States	Panama City, Panama
20:00 ET	Gómez 44'	Report	Dempsey 40'	Stadium: Estadio Rommel Fernández; Referee: César Arturo Ramos (Mexico)

June 8 Fifth round	United States	2–0	Trinidad and Tobago	Commerce City, Colorado
19:50 ET	Pulisic 52', 62'	Report		Stadium: Dick's Sporting Goods Park; Attendance: 19,188; Referee: Óscar Moncada (Honduras)

June 11 Fifth round	Mexico	1–1	United States	Mexico City, Mexico
20:30 ET	Vela 23'	Report	Bradley 6'	Stadium: Estadio Azteca; Attendance: 71,537; Referee: Joel Aguilar (El Salvador)

September 1 Fifth round	United States	0–2	Costa Rica	Harrison, New Jersey
18:30 ET		Report	Ureña 30', 82'	Stadium: Red Bull Arena; Attendance: 26,500; Referee: John Pitti (Panama)

September 5 Fifth round	Honduras	1–1	United States	San Pedro Sula, Honduras
17:30 ET	Quioto 27'	Report	Wood 85'	Stadium: Estadio Olímpico Metropolitano; Attendance: 37,325; Referee: Joel Aguilar (El Salvador)

October 6 Fifth round	United States	4–0	Panama	Orlando, Florida
19:00 ET	Pulisic 8'; Altidore 19', 43' (pen.); Wood 63'	Report		Stadium: Orlando City Stadium; Attendance: 25,303; Referee: Roberto García Orozco (Mexico)

October 10 Fifth round	Trinidad and Tobago	2–1	United States	Couva, Trinidad and Tobago
20:00 ET	Gonzalez 17' (o.g.); A. Jones 37'	Report	Pulisic 47'	Stadium: Ato Boldon Stadium; Referee: Juan Guerra (Guatemala)

====== Group B ======
Pos	Team	Pld	W	D	L	GF	GA	GD	Pts	Qualification
1	United States (H)	3	2	1	0	7	3	+4	7	Advance to knockout stage
2	Panama	3	2	1	0	6	2	+4	7	Advance to knockout stage
3	Martinique	3	1	0	2	4	6	−2	3	
4	Nicaragua	3	0	0	3	1	7	−6	0	

Source: CONCACAF
Rules for classification: Group stage tiebreakers
(H) Hosts

July 8 Group B	United States	1–1	Panama	Nashville, Tennessee
16:30 ET	Dwyer 50'	Report	Camargo 60'	Stadium: Nissan Stadium; Attendance: 47,622; Referee: Fernando Guerrero (Mexico)

July 12 Group B	United States	3–2	Martinique	Tampa, Florida
21:00 ET	Gonzalez 53'; Morris 64', 76'	Report	Parsemain 66', 74'	Stadium: Raymond James Stadium; Attendance: 23,368; Referee: Henry Bejarano (Costa Rica)

July 15 Group B	Nicaragua	0–3	United States	Cleveland, Ohio
19:00 ET		Report	Corona 37'; Rowe 56'; Miazga 88'	Stadium: FirstEnergy Stadium; Attendance: 27,934; Referee: Melvin Matamoros (Honduras)

July 19 Quarter-finals	United States	2–0	El Salvador	Philadelphia, Pennsylvania
21:00 ET	O. Gonzalez 41'; Lichaj 45+2'	Report		Stadium: Lincoln Financial Field; Attendance: 31,615; Referee: Drew Fischer (Canada)

July 22 Semi-finals	Costa Rica	0–2	United States	Arlington, Texas
22:00 ET		Report	Altidore 72'; Dempsey 82'	Stadium: AT&T Stadium; Attendance: 45,516; Referee: Joel Aguilar (El Salvador)

July 26 Final	United States	2–1	Jamaica	Santa Clara, California
21:30 ET	Altidore 45'; Morris 88'	Report	Watson 50'	Stadium: Levi's Stadium; Attendance: 63,032; Referee: Walter López (Guatemala)

===== Goalscorers =====
Goals are current as of November 14, 2017, after match against Portugal.

Player	Goals
Christian Pulisic	6
Clint Dempsey	5
Jordan Morris	4
Jozy Altidore	4
Michael Bradley	2
Dom Dwyer	2
Omar Gonzalez	2
Bobby Wood	2
Sebastian Lletget	1
Kellyn Acosta	1
Joe Corona	1
Kelyn Rowe	1
Matt Miazga	1
Eric Lichaj	1
Weston McKennie	1

===== Managerial changes =====
This is a list of changes of managers:

Team	Outgoing manager	Manner of departure	Date of departure	Incoming manager	Date of appointment
United States	(United States) Bruce Arena	Resigned	October 13	(United States) Dave Sarachan (caretaker)	October 24

==== U-20 ====
===== CONCACAF Under-20 Championship =====
====== Group stage ======
Pos	Team	Pld	W	D	L	GF	GA	GD	Pts	Qualification
1	Panama	3	3	0	0	8	1	+7	9	Classification stage
2	United States	3	2	0	1	8	3	+5	6	Classification stage
3	Haiti	3	1	0	2	7	8	−1	3	
4	Saint Kitts and Nevis	3	0	0	3	2	13	−11	0	

Source: CONCACAF
Rules for classification: Group stage tiebreakers

February 18 Group B	United States	0–1	Panama	Tibás, Costa Rica
16:00 ET		Report		Stadium: Estadio Ricardo Saprissa Aymá; Referee: Armando Castro (Honduras)

February 21 Group B	United States	4–1	Haiti	San José, Costa Rica
17:30 ET		Report		Stadium: Estadio Nacional

February 24 Group B	United States	4–1	Saint Kitts and Nevis	Tibás, Costa Rica
17:30 ET				Stadium: Estadio Ricardo Saprissa Aymá

====== Classification stage ======
Pos	Team	Pld	W	D	L	GF	GA	GD	Pts	Qualification
1	United States	2	2	0	0	3	1	+2	6	Final and 2017 FIFA U-20 World Cup
2	Mexico	2	1	0	1	6	2	+4	3	2017 FIFA U-20 World Cup
3	El Salvador	2	0	0	2	2	8	−6	0	

Source: CONCACAF
Rules for classification: Group stage tiebreakers

February 27 Group D	United States	1–0	Mexico	Tibás, Costa Rica
17:00 ET				Stadium: Estadio Ricardo Saprissa Aymá

March 3 Group D	United States	2–1	El Salvador	San José, Costa Rica
18:30 ET		Report		Stadium: Estadio Nacional

March 5 Final	United States	0–0 (5–3 p)	Honduras	San José, Costa Rica
16:00 ET		Report		Stadium: Estadio Nacional; Referee: Henry Bejarano Matarrita (Costa Rica)
	Penalties
	Lennon (penalty scored); Craft (penalty scored); Sabbi (penalty scored); De La Torre (penalty scored); Acosta (penalty scored)		(penalty scored) Álvarez; (penalty scored) Martinez; (penalty scored) Grant; (penalty missed) Flores

===== 2017 FIFA U-20 World Cup =====
====== Group F ======
Pos	Team	Pld	W	D	L	GF	GA	GD	Pts	Qualification
1	United States	3	1	2	0	5	4	+1	5	Knockout stage
2	Senegal	3	1	1	1	2	1	+1	4	Knockout stage
3	Saudi Arabia	3	1	1	1	3	4	−1	4	Knockout stage
4	Ecuador	3	0	2	1	4	5	−1	2	

Source: FIFA
Rules for classification: Group stage tiebreakers

May 22 Group F	Ecuador	3–3	United States	Incheon, South Korea
04:00 ET	Lino 5'; Cabezas 7', 64'	Report	Sargent 36', 54' de la Torre 90+4'	Stadium: Incheon Football Stadium; Attendance: 3,886; Referee: Björn Kuipers (Netherlands)

May 25 Group F	Senegal	0–1	United States	Incheon, South Korea
07:00 ET		Report	Sargent 34'	Stadium: Incheon Football Stadium; Attendance: 5,864; Referee: Andrés Cunha (Uruguay)

May 28 Group F	United States	1–1	Saudi Arabia	Daejeon, South Korea
05:00 ET	Lennon 40'	Report	Alamri 74'	Stadium: Daejeon World Cup Stadium; Attendance: 5,460; Referee: Diego Haro (Peru)

June 1 Round of 16	United States	6–0	New Zealand	Incheon, South Korea
07:00 ET	Sargent 32'; Ebobisse 64'; Lennon 65'; Glad 76'; Trusty 84'; Kunga 90+3'	Report		Stadium: Incheon Football Stadium; Attendance: 5,667; Referee: Abdulrahman Al-Jassim (Qatar)

June 4 QF	Venezuela	2–1 (a.e.t.)	United States	Jeonju, South Korea
02:00 ET	Peñaranda 96'; Ferraresi 115'	Report	Ebobisse 117'	Stadium: Jeonju World Cup Stadium; Attendance: 2,671; Referee: Jonas Eriksson (Sweden)

==== U-19 ====
===== Friendlies =====
February 5	United States	2–1	El Salvador	Fort Lauderdale, Florida
13:00 EST		Report		Stadium: Broward Regional Park

==== U-18 ====
===== 2017 Slovakia Cup =====
April 24	United States	1–1	Hungary	Trnava, Slovakia
09:00 ET		Report		Stadium: Jaslovsje Bohunice

April 25	United States	2–1	Belarus	Trnava, Slovakia
09:00 ET		Report		Stadium: Jaslovsje Bohunice

May 28	United States	1–1 (4–3 p)	Slovakia	Trnava, Slovakia
05:00 ET		Report		Stadium: Jaslovsje Bohunice

===== 2017 U-18 Lisbon International Tournament =====
June 14	United States	0–2	Japan	Lisbon, Portugal
		JP

June 16	United States	v	Norway	Lisbon, Portugal

June 18	United States	2–1	Portugal	Lisbon, Portugal
		PT

==== U-17 ====
===== Friendlies =====
February 1	United States	0–6	(United States) D.C. United	Bradenton, Florida
07:00 EST		Report	Vincent 22'; Sam 24'; Neagle 27'; Ortiz 48'; Le Toux 53'; Büscher 66'	Stadium: IMG Academy

===== CONCACAF U-17 Championship =====
====== Group stage ======
Pos	Team	Pld	W	D	L	GF	GA	GD	Pts	Qualification
1	United States	3	3	0	0	10	3	+7	9	Classification stage
2	Mexico	3	2	0	1	14	5	+9	6	Classification stage
3	Jamaica	3	1	0	2	4	11	−7	3	
4	El Salvador	3	0	0	3	1	10	−9	0	

Source: CONCACAF
Rules for classification: Group stage tiebreakers

April 23 Group C	Jamaica	0–5	United States	Panama City, Panama
01:30 ET		Report	Durkin 53'; Weah 77'; Sargent 87'; Akinola 88', 90+2'	Stadium: Estadio Maracaná; Referee: Adrián Skeete (Barbados)

April 26 Group C	Mexico	3–4	United States	Panama City, Panama
18:30 ET	González 6', 44'; Lindsey 90+2' (o.g.)	Report	Sargent 26', 40'; Ferri 51'; Akinola 84'	Stadium: Estadio Maracaná; Referee: José Kellys Marquez (Panama)

April 29 Group C	El Salvador	0–1	United States	Panama City, Panama
14:00 ET		Report	Jones 52'	Stadium: Estadio Maracaná; Referee: Michele Rodriguez (Cuba)

====== Classification stage ======
Pos	Team	Pld	W	D	L	GF	GA	GD	Pts	Qualification
1	United States	2	2	0	0	9	2	+7	6	Final and 2017 FIFA U-17 World Cup
2	Honduras	2	1	0	1	7	4	+3	3	2017 FIFA U-17 World Cup
3	Cuba	2	0	0	2	3	13	−10	0	

Source: CONCACAF
Rules for classification: Group stage tiebreakers

May 3 Group D	Honduras	0–3	United States	Panama City, Panama
16:30 ET		Report	Sargent 26', 82'; Akinola 65'	Stadium: Estadio Maracaná; Referee: Luis Enrique Santander (Mexico)

May 5 Group D	Cuba	2–6	United States	Panama City, Panama
17:30 ET	Savigne 19'; Vasquez 47' (o.g.)	Report	Vassilev 15'; Coll 37' (o.g.); Carleton 39'; Jones 49'; Reynolds 83'; Weah 88'	Stadium: Estadio Maracaná; Referee: Daneion Parchment (Jamaica)

May 7 Final	United States	1–1 (4–5 p)	Mexico	Panama City, Panama
15:00 ET		Report		Stadium: Estadio Rommel Fernández

===== 2017 FIFA U-17 World Cup =====
====== Group A ======
Pos	Team	Pld	W	D	L	GF	GA	GD	Pts	Qualification
1	Ghana	3	2	0	1	5	1	+4	6	Knockout stage
2	Colombia	3	2	0	1	5	3	+2	6 (Note: Head-to-head points: Colombia 3, United States 0.)	Knockout stage
3	United States	3	2	0	1	5	3	+2	6	Knockout stage
4	India (H)	3	0	0	3	1	9	−8	0	

Source: FIFA
Rules for classification: Group stage tiebreakers
(H) Hosts

====== Ranking of third-placed teams ======
Pos	Grp	Team	Pld	W	D	L	GF	GA	GD	Pts	Qualification
1	A	United States	3	2	0	1	5	3	+2	6	Knockout stage
2	E	Honduras	3	1	0	2	7	11	−4	3	Knockout stage
3	D	Niger	3	1	0	2	1	6	−5	3	Knockout stage
4	F	Mexico	3	0	2	1	3	4	−1	2	Knockout stage
5	B	New Zealand	3	0	1	2	4	8	−4	1 (Note: Fair play points: New Zealand −6, Guinea −9.)	
6	C	Guinea	3	0	1	2	4	8	−4	1	

Source: FIFA
Rules for classification: 1) Points; 2) Goal difference; 3) Goals scored; 4) Fair play points; 5) Drawing of lots.

====== Matches ======
October 6 Group A	India	0–3	United States	New Delhi, India
10:30 ET		Report	Sargent 30' (pen.); Durkin 51'; Carleton 84'	Stadium: Jawaharlal Nehru Stadium; Attendance: 46,750; Referee: Gery Vargas (Bolivia)

October 9 Group A	Ghana	0–1	United States	New Delhi, India
7:30 ET			Akinola 75'	Stadium: Jawaharlal Nehru Stadium; Attendance: 17,500; Referee: Anastasios Sidiropoulos (Greece)

October 12 Group A	United States	1–3	Colombia	Navi Mumbai, India
10:30 ET	Acosta 24'	Report	Vidal 3'; Peñaloza 67'; Caicedo 87'	Stadium: DY Patil Stadium; Attendance: 22,263; Referee: Artur Soares Dias (Portugal)

October 16 Round of 16	Paraguay	0–5	United States	New Delhi, India
10:30 ET			Weah 19', 53', 77'; Carleton 63'; Sargent 74'	Stadium: Jawaharlal Nehru Stadium; Referee: Ovidiu Hațegan (Romania)

October 21 QF	United States	1–4	England	Margao, India
10:30 ET	Sargent 72'	Report	Brewster 11', 14', 90+6' (pen.); Gibbs-White 64'	Stadium: Fatorda Stadium; Attendance: 16,148; Referee: Clément Turpin (France)

==== U-16 ====
===== Montaigu Tournament =====
====== Group phase ======
11 April	United States	1–0	Belgium	Mouilleron-le-Captif, France
6:30 PM CEST	Konrad de la Fuente 47' (pen.)	Report		Stadium: Espace sportif Gaston Renaud

13 April	United States	2–3	Japan	Mouilleron-le-Captif, France
6:30 PM CEST	Konrad de la Fuente 3'; Gabel Segal 76'	Report	Ten Miyagi 30'; Shota Fujio 66' (pen.); Taiki Yamada 68'	Stadium: Espace sportif Gaston Renaud

====== Classification stage ======
15 April	United States	3–0	Mexico	Talmont-Saint-Hilaire, France
6:00 PM CEST	Stefan Stojanovic 31', 78'; Konrad de la Fuente 66'	Report

17 April	United States	0–2	Brazil	La Chaize-le-Vicomte, France
10:00 AM CEST		Report	Rodrygo Sylva de Goes 42'; Joao Castro Olivera 80+2'

==== U-15 ====
===== 2017 Torneo Delle Nazioni =====
April 25	United States	4–0	Slovenia	Ajdovščina, Slovenia
11:30 ET		Report		Stadium: Ajdovščina Stadium

April 26	United States	2–1	Russia	Nova Gorica, Slovenia
11:00 ET		Report		Stadium: Vipolze Stadium;

April 27	England	3–2	United States	Precenicco, Italy
11:00 ET		Report		Stadium: Stadio di Precenicco

April 29	United States	4–2	Portugal	Gorizia, Italy
11:00 ET		Report		Stadium: Stadio di Cormons

May 1	United States	2–1	England	Gradisca d'Isonzo, Italy
10:00 ET		Report		Stadium: Stadio di Gradisca;

==== U.S. Beach National Team ====
===== 2017 CONCACAF Beach Soccer Championship =====
====== Group stage ======
February 20 Group C	United States	8–1	U.S. Virgin Islands	Nassau, Bahamas
18:45 ET		Report		Stadium: Malcolm Beach Soccer Facility

February 22 Group C	Antigua and Barbuda	2–7	United States	Nassau, Bahamas
18:45 ET		Report		Stadium: Malcolm Beach Soccer Facility

February 23 Group C	United States	5–1	Trinidad and Tobago	Nassau, Bahamas
20:00 ET		Report		Stadium: Malcolm Beach Soccer Facility

====== Knockout stage ======
February 24 QF	United States	4–6	Panama	Nassau, Bahamas
18:45 ET		Report		Stadium: Malcolm Beach Soccer Facility

February 25 5th-SF	United States	6–2	Jamaica	Nassau, Bahamas
17:30 ET		Report		Stadium: Malcolm Beach Soccer Facility

February 26 5th Place	Bahamas	2–4	United States	Nassau, Bahamas
17:30 ET		Report		Stadium: Malcolm Beach Soccer Facility

=== Women's ===
==== Senior ====
Wins	Losses	Draws
12	3	1

===== Results and fixtures =====
====== Friendlies ======
April 6	United States	4–0	Russia	Frisco, Texas
20:30 ET	Dunn 10', 41'; Long 18', 70'	Report		Stadium: Toyota Stadium; Attendance: 15,191; Referee: Ekaterina Koroleva (United States)

April 9	United States	5–1	Russia	Houston, Texas
14:00 ET	Lloyd 20' (pen.); Lavelle 37'; Dunn 38', 48'; Kovalenko 45+2' (o.g.)	Report	Karpova 42' (pen.)	Stadium: BBVA Compass Stadium; Attendance: 11,347; Referee: Karen Abt (United States)

June 8	Sweden	0–1	United States	Gothenburg, Sweden
13:30 ET		Report	Lavelle 56'	Stadium: Gamla Ullevi Stadium; Referee: Olga Zadinova (Czech Republic)

June 11	Norway	0–1	United States	Sandefjord, Norway
13:15 ET		Report	Press 60'	Stadium: Komplett Arena; Attendance: 3,866; Referee: Amy Fearn (England)

September 15	United States	3–1	New Zealand	Commerce City, Colorado
22:00 ET	Ertz 16', 24'; Morgan 79'	Report	Wilkinson 75'	Stadium: Dick's Sporting Goods Park; Attendance: 17,301; Referee: Katja Koroleva (United States)

September 19	United States	5–0	New Zealand	Cincinnati, Ohio
19:30 ET	Horan 36'; Pugh 44'; Morgan 46', 69'; Williams 55'	Report		Stadium: Nippert Stadium; Attendance: 30,596; Referee: Christina Unkel (United States)

October 19	United States	3–1	South Korea	New Orleans, Louisiana
20:00 ET	Ertz 24'; Morgan 40'; Rapinoe 52' (pen.)	Report	Han 52'	Stadium: Mercedes-Benz Superdome; Attendance: 9,371; Referee: Christina Unkel (United States)

October 22	United States	6–0	South Korea	Cary, North Carolina
14:00 ET	Mewis 3', 20'; Press 35'; Ertz 45+1'; Williams 61'; Long 83'	Report		Stadium: WakeMed Soccer Park; Attendance: 9,727; Referee: Sheena Dickson (Canada)

November 9	Canada	1–1	United States	Vancouver, Canada
22:00 ET	Leon 56'	Report	Morgan 31'	Stadium: BC Place; Attendance: 28,017; Referee: Marianela Araya Cruz (Costa Rica)

November 12	United States	3–1	Canada	San Jose, California
21:00 ET	Ertz 11'; Morgan 56'; Lloyd 80'	Report	Beckie 50'	Stadium: Avaya Stadium; Attendance: 17,960; Referee: Karen Abt (United States)

====== She Believes Cup ======
Pos	Team	Pld	W	D	L	GF	GA	GD	Pts
1	France (C)	3	2	1	0	5	1	+4	7
2	Germany	3	1	1	1	1	1	0	4
3	England	3	1	0	2	2	3	−1	3
4	United States (H)	3	1	0	2	1	4	−3	3

Source: Flashscore
Rules for classification: 1) points; 2) Goal difference; 3) Goals scored; 4) head-to-head points; 5) head-to-head goal difference; 6) head-to-head number of goals scored; 7) FIFA ranking.
(C) Champions; (H) Hosts

March 1	United States	1–0	Germany	Chester, Pennsylvania
19:00 ET	Williams 56'	Report		Stadium: Talen Energy Stadium; Attendance: 16,318; Referee: Carol Ann Chenard (Canada)

March 4	United States	0–1	England	Harrison, New Jersey
17:00 ET		Report	White 89'	Stadium: Red Bull Arena; Attendance: 26,500; Referee: Quetzalli Alvarado (Mexico)

March 8	United States	0–3	France	Washington, D.C.
19:00 ET		Report	Abily 8' (pen.), 63'; Le Sommer 10'	Stadium: RFK Stadium; Attendance: 21,638; Referee: Marie-Soleil Beaudoin (United States)

====== 2017 Tournament of Nations ======
Pos	Team	Pld	W	D	L	GF	GA	GD	Pts
1	Australia (C)	3	3	0	0	11	3	+8	9
2	United States (H)	3	2	0	1	7	4	+3	6
3	Japan	3	0	1	2	3	8	−5	1
4	Brazil	3	0	1	2	5	11	−6	1

Rules for classification: 1) Points; 2) Goal difference; 3) Goals scored; 4) Head-to-head; 5) FIFA Ranking
(C) Champions; (H) Hosts

July 27 Tournament of Nations	United States	0–1	Australia	Seattle, Washington
22:00 ET		Report	Butt 67'	Stadium: CenturyLink Field; Attendance: 15,748; Referee: Marie-Soleil Beaudoin (Canada)

July 30 Tournament of Nations	United States	4–3	Brazil	San Diego, California
20:00 ET	Mewis 18'; Press 80'; Rapinoe 85'; Ertz 89'	Report	Andressa 2', 78'; Bruna 63'	Stadium: Qualcomm Stadium; Attendance: 21,096; Referee: Melissa Borjas (Honduras)

August 3 Tournament of Nations	United States	3–0	Japan	Carson, California
22:00 ET	Rapinoe 12'; Pugh 60'; Morgan 80'	Report		Stadium: StubHub Center; Attendance: 23,161; Referee: Carol-Ann Chenard (Canada)

===== Goalscorers =====
Goals are current as of November 12, 2017 after match against Canada.

Player	Goals
Alex Morgan	7
Julie Ertz	6
Crystal Dunn	4
Megan Rapinoe	3
Allie Long	3
Christen Press	3
Lynn Williams	3
Sam Mewis	3
Rose Lavelle	2
Mallory Pugh	2
Carli Lloyd	2
Lindsey Horan	1
own goal	1

==== U-23 ====
===== Nordic Four-Nations Tournament =====
June 6	United States	3–0	Norway	Karlstad, Sweden
	Jaelin Howell 71'; Sophia Smith 73'; Kaleigh Riehl 82'	Report		Stadium: Tingvalla IP

===== Friendlies =====
April 7	United States	0–3	(United States) Orlando Pride	Sanford, Florida
17:30 ET		Report		Stadium: Sylvan Lake Park

===== La Manga Tournament =====
March 2	United States	2–0	Japan	La Manga, Spain
07:00 ET		Report		Stadium: La Manga Club Resort

March 4	United States	0–2	England	La Manga, Spain
9:00 ET		Report		Stadium: La Manga Club Resort

March 7	United States	1–0	Norway	La Manga, Spain
13:00 ET		Report		Stadium: La Manga Club Resort

===== 2017 Thorns Spring Invitational =====
March 26	United States	1–2	(United States) Houston Dash	Portland, Oregon
17:30 ET		Report		Stadium: Providence Park

March 29	United States	2–1	(United States) Portland Thorns FC	Portland, Oregon
20:00 ET		Report		Stadium: Providence Park

April 1	United States	0–0	(United States) Chicago Red Stars	Portland, Oregon
20:00 ET		Report		Stadium: Providence Park

==== U-20 ====
===== Friendlies =====
May 22	United States	1–2	Japan	Carson, California
		Report		Stadium: Glenn “Mooch” Myernick Field

May 24	United States	2–2	Japan	Carson, California
		Report		Stadium: Glenn “Mooch” Myernick Field

===== La Manga Tournament =====
March 3	United States	8–2	Norway	La Manga, Spain
10:30 ET		Report		Stadium: La Manga Club Resort

March 5	United States	1–2	Germany	La Manga, Spain
08:00 ET		Report		Stadium: La Manga Club Resort

March 7	United States	2–0	France	La Manga, Spain
09:00 ET		Report		Stadium: La Manga Club Resort

==== U-19 ====
===== Friendlies =====
May 19	United States	0–1	Japan	Carson, California
		Report		Stadium: Glenn “Mooch” Myernick Field

June 10	Czech Republic	5–2	United States	Prague, Czech Republic
		Report		Stadium: Stadium Admira

June 13	Czech Republic	1–2	United States	Prague, Czech Republic
		Report		Stadium: Stadium Admira

==== U-18 ====
===== Friendlies =====
February 19	United States	3–1	England	Staffordshire, England
9:00 ET		Report		Stadium: St George's Park National Football Centre

February 21	United States	5–0	Norway	Staffordshire, England
		Report		Stadium: St George's Park National Football Centre

February 25	United States	0–0	England	Wellington, England
		Report		Stadium: New Bucks Head

==== U-17 ====
===== 2017 Torneo Femminile Delle Nazioni =====
25 April	United States	1–1	Slovenia	Ajdovščina, Slovenia
10:00 AM ET	Jordan Canniff 58'	Report	Marusa Cesnik 39'

26 April	United States	4–0	Mexico	Fiumicello, Italy
10:00 AM ET	Lia Godfrey 1', 13'; Maya Doms 9'; Kate Wiesner 46' (pen.)	Report

28 April	United States	2–0	England	Nova Gorica, Slovenia
11:00 AM ET	Payton Linnehan 30'; Jordan Canniff 35'	Report		Stadium: Nova Gorica Sports Park

29 April	United States	6–0	Italy	Gradisca d'Isonzo, Italy
11:00 AM ET	Mia Fishel 16'; Maya Doms 25', 28'; Kalyssa Van Zanten 46'; Croix Bethune 65'; Lia Godfrey 67'	Report
Note: Championship Game

===== CFA International Women's Youth Tournament 2017 Weifang =====
12 July	United States	2–0	Japan	Weifang, China
	Jordan Canniff 35'; Astrid Wheeler 78'	Report		Stadium: Weifang Sports Center Stadium

14 July	United States	1–1	Canada	Weifang, China
	Michela Agresti 24'	Report	Ariel Young 50'	Stadium: Weifang Sports Center Stadium

16 July	United States	4–5	China	Weifang, China
	Kate Wiesner 20'; Ainsley Ahmadian 30'; Jordan Canniff 44', 59'	Report	Han Tang 9'; Quian Yang 23', 33', 63'; LinyN Zhang 90'	Stadium: Weifang Sports Center Stadium; Attendance: 1000

==== U-16 ====
===== Women's U-16 Development Tournament =====
May 12	United States	4–0	Croatia	Woluwe-Saint-Lambert, Belgium
	Trinity Rodman 20'; Joyelle Washington 42', 43'; Michelle Cooper 56'	Report

May 14	United States	1–0	Belgium	Woluwe-Saint-Lambert, Belgium
	Frieke Temmerman 80+1' (o.g.)	Report

May 16	United States	2–1	Switzerland	Woluwe-Saint-Lambert, Belgium
	Samantha Kroeger 1'; Allyson Sentnor 27'	Report	Mona Gubler 38' (pen.)

== Club competitions ==
=== Men's ===
==== League Competitions ====
===== Major League Soccer =====
====== Conference tables ======
Eastern Conference

Pos	Team	Pld	W	L	T	GF	GA	GD	Pts	Qualification
1	Toronto FC	34	20	5	9	74	37	+37	69	MLS Cup Conference Semifinals
2	New York City FC	34	16	9	9	56	43	+13	57	MLS Cup Conference Semifinals
3	Chicago Fire	34	16	11	7	62	48	+14	55	MLS Cup Knockout Round
4	Atlanta United FC	34	15	9	10	70	40	+30	55	MLS Cup Knockout Round
5	Columbus Crew	34	16	12	6	53	49	+4	54	MLS Cup Knockout Round
6	New York Red Bulls	34	14	12	8	53	47	+6	50	MLS Cup Knockout Round
7	New England Revolution	34	13	15	6	53	61	−8	45	
8	Philadelphia Union	34	11	14	9	50	47	+3	42	
9	Montreal Impact	34	11	17	6	52	58	−6	39	
10	Orlando City SC	34	10	15	9	39	58	−19	39	
11	D.C. United	34	9	20	5	31	60	−29	32	

Source: MLS

Western Conference

Pos	Team	Pld	W	L	T	GF	GA	GD	Pts	Qualification
1	Portland Timbers	34	15	11	8	60	50	+10	53	MLS Cup Conference Semifinals
2	Seattle Sounders FC	34	14	9	11	52	39	+13	53	MLS Cup Conference Semifinals
3	Vancouver Whitecaps FC	34	15	12	7	50	49	+1	52	MLS Cup Knockout Round
4	Houston Dynamo	34	13	10	11	57	45	+12	50	MLS Cup Knockout Round
5	Sporting Kansas City	34	12	9	13	40	29	+11	49	MLS Cup Knockout Round
6	San Jose Earthquakes	34	13	14	7	39	60	−21	46	MLS Cup Knockout Round
7	FC Dallas	34	11	10	13	48	48	0	46	
8	Real Salt Lake	34	13	15	6	48	56	−8	45	
9	Minnesota United FC	34	10	18	6	47	70	−23	36	
10	Colorado Rapids	34	9	19	6	31	51	−20	33	
11	LA Galaxy	34	8	18	8	45	67	−22	32	

Source: MLS

====== 2017 table ======
Note: the table below has no impact on playoff qualification and is used solely for determining host of the MLS Cup, certain CCL spots, the Supporters' Shield trophy, seeding in the 2018 Canadian Championship, and 2018 MLS draft. The conference tables are the sole determinant for teams qualifying for the playoffs.

Pos	Team	Pld	W	L	T	GF	GA	GD	Pts	Qualification
1	Toronto FC (C, S)	34	20	5	9	74	37	+37	69	CONCACAF Champions League
2	New York City FC	34	16	9	9	56	43	+13	57	
3	Chicago Fire	34	16	11	7	61	47	+14	55	
4	Atlanta United FC	34	15	9	10	70	40	+30	55	
5	Columbus Crew	34	16	12	6	53	49	+4	54	
6	Portland Timbers	34	15	11	8	60	50	+10	53	
7	Seattle Sounders FC	34	14	9	11	52	39	+13	53	
8	Vancouver Whitecaps FC	34	15	12	7	50	49	+1	52	
9	New York Red Bulls	34	14	12	8	53	47	+6	50	
10	Houston Dynamo	34	13	10	11	57	45	+12	50	
11	Sporting Kansas City	34	12	9	13	40	29	+11	49	CONCACAF Champions League
12	San Jose Earthquakes	34	13	14	7	39	60	−21	46	
13	FC Dallas	34	11	10	13	48	48	0	46	
14	Real Salt Lake	34	13	15	6	49	55	−6	45	
15	New England Revolution	34	13	15	6	53	61	−8	45	
16	Philadelphia Union	34	11	14	9	50	47	+3	42	
17	Montreal Impact	34	11	17	6	52	58	−6	39	
18	Orlando City SC	34	10	15	9	39	58	−19	39	
19	Minnesota United FC	34	10	18	6	47	70	−23	36	
20	Colorado Rapids	34	9	19	6	31	51	−20	33	
21	D.C. United	34	9	20	5	31	60	−29	32	
22	LA Galaxy	34	8	18	8	45	67	−22	32	

Source: MLS
Rules for classification: 1) points; 2) total wins; 3) total goal differential; 4) total goals scored; 5) disciplinary points; 6) away goals scored; 7) away goal differential; 8) coin toss or drawing of lots
(C) MLS Cup Champion; (S) Supporters' Shield

====== Aggregate 2017 and 2018 table ======
As Toronto FC won MLS Cup 2017, one of the U.S. berths for the 2019 CONCACAF Champions League had to be reallocated, to the U.S. non-champions with the best aggregate record over the 2017 and 2018 MLS regular seasons. As the top ranked team in the table, Atlanta United FC, also qualified for the Champions League by winning MLS Cup 2018, the Champions League spot via the aggregate table was instead awarded to the second-placed team, the New York Red Bulls.

Note: Only U.S. teams are listed in this table.

Pos	Team	Pld	W	L	T	GF	GA	GD	Pts	Qualification
1	Atlanta United FC	68	36	16	16	140	84	+56	124	2019 CONCACAF Champions League (Note: As MLS Cup 2018 champions (USA1))
2	New York Red Bulls	68	36	19	13	115	80	+35	121	2019 CONCACAF Champions League (Note: As best aggregate 2017 and 2018 record (USA4))
3	New York City FC	68	32	19	17	115	88	+27	113	
4	Seattle Sounders FC	68	32	20	16	104	76	+28	112	
5	Sporting Kansas City	68	30	17	21	105	69	+36	111	2019 CONCACAF Champions League (Note: As 2017 U.S. Open Cup champions (USA2))
6	Portland Timbers	68	30	21	17	114	98	+16	107	
7	Columbus Crew	68	30	23	15	96	94	+2	105	
8	FC Dallas	68	27	19	22	100	92	+8	103	
9	Real Salt Lake	68	27	28	13	104	113	−9	94	
10	Philadelphia Union	68	26	28	14	99	97	+2	92	
11	Houston Dynamo	68	23	26	19	115	103	+12	88	2019 CONCACAF Champions League (Note: As 2018 U.S. Open Cup champions (USA3))
12	Chicago Fire	68	24	29	15	106	105	+1	87	
13	New England Revolution	68	23	28	17	102	116	−14	86	
14	D.C. United	68	23	31	14	91	110	−19	83	
15	LA Galaxy	68	21	30	17	111	131	−20	80	
16	Minnesota United	68	21	38	9	97	141	−44	72	
17	Orlando City	68	18	37	13	82	132	−50	67	
18	San Jose Earthquakes	68	17	35	16	84	126	−42	67	
19	Colorado Rapids	68	17	38	13	67	114	−47	64	
20	Los Angeles FC	34	16	9	9	68	52	+16	57	

Source: MLS
Rules for classification: 1) points; 2) total wins; 3) total goal differential; 4) total goals scored; 5) disciplinary points; 6) away goals scored; 7) away goal differential; 8) coin toss or drawing of lots

====== MLS Playoffs ======
Knockout round	Conference semifinals
E5	Columbus Crew	4	0	4
October 26 – Atlanta, Georgia
E2	New York City FC	1	2	3
E4	Atlanta United FC	0 (1)
E5	Columbus Crew (p)	0 (3)
Eastern Conference
E6	New York Red Bulls	1	1	2
October 25 – Bridgeview, Illinois
E1	Toronto FC	2	0	2 (a)
E3	Chicago Fire	0
E6	New York Red Bulls	4
W4	Houston Dynamo	0	2	2
October 26 – Houston, Texas
W1	Portland Timbers	0	1	1
W4	Houston Dynamo (a.e.t.)	1
W5	Sporting Kansas City	0
Western Conference
W3	Vancouver Whitecaps FC	0	0	0
October 25 – Vancouver, British Columbia
W2	Seattle Sounders FC	0	2	2
W3	Vancouver Whitecaps FC	5
W6	San Jose Earthquakes	0

Conference finals
E5	Columbus Crew	0	0	0
E1	Toronto FC	0	1	1
W4	Houston Dynamo	0	0	0
W2	Seattle Sounders FC	2	3	5

MLS Cup; December 9 – Toronto, Ontario
E1	Toronto FC	2
W2	Seattle Sounders FC	0

====== MLS Cup 2017 ======
December 9, 2017
4:00 PM EST

Toronto FC	2–0	Seattle Sounders FC
Altidore 67'; Vázquez 90+4'	Report

BMO Field, Toronto, Ontario
Attendance: 30,584
Referee: Allen Chapman (United States)

===== North American Soccer League =====
====== Spring Season ======
Pos	Team	Pld	W	D	L	GF	GA	GD	Pts	Qualification
1	Miami FC (S)	16	11	3	2	33	11	+22	36	Playoffs
2	San Francisco Deltas	16	7	5	4	17	20	−3	26	
3	New York Cosmos	16	6	6	4	22	21	+1	24	
4	Jacksonville Armada	16	6	6	4	17	16	+1	24	
5	North Carolina FC	16	6	3	7	21	22	−1	21	
6	Indy Eleven	16	4	8	4	21	22	−1	20	
7	FC Edmonton	16	4	1	11	11	21	−10	13	
8	Puerto Rico FC	16	1	6	9	19	28	−9	9	

Source: NASL
Rules for classification: 1) points; 2) total goal differential; 3) total goals scored; 4) head-to-head record; 5) away goal differential; 6) away goals scored
(S) Spring season champion

====== Fall Season ======
Pos	Team	Pld	W	D	L	GF	GA	GD	Pts	Qualification
1	Miami FC (F)	16	10	3	3	28	17	+11	33	Playoffs
2	San Francisco Deltas	16	7	7	2	24	15	+9	28	
3	North Carolina FC	16	5	9	2	25	15	+10	24	
4	New York Cosmos	16	4	9	3	34	30	+4	21	
5	Jacksonville Armada	16	4	7	5	21	22	−1	19	
6	Puerto Rico FC	16	4	4	8	13	23	−10	16	
7	FC Edmonton	16	3	5	8	14	21	−7	14	
8	Indy Eleven	16	3	4	9	18	34	−16	13	

Source: NASL
Rules for classification: 1) points; 2) total goal differential; 3) total goals scored; 4) head-to-head record; 5) away goal differential; 6) away goals scored
(F) Fall season champion

===== USL =====
Eastern Conference

Pos	Team	Pld	W	D	L	GF	GA	GD	Pts	Qualification
1	Louisville City FC (C)	32	18	8	6	58	31	+27	62	Conference Playoffs
2	Charleston Battery	32	15	9	8	53	33	+20	54	Conference Playoffs
3	Tampa Bay Rowdies	32	14	11	7	50	35	+15	53	Conference Playoffs
4	Rochester Rhinos	32	14	11	7	36	28	+8	53	Conference Playoffs
5	Charlotte Independence	32	13	9	10	52	40	+12	48	Conference Playoffs
6	FC Cincinnati	32	12	10	10	46	48	−2	46	Conference Playoffs
7	New York Red Bulls II	32	13	5	14	57	60	−3	44	Conference Playoffs
8	Bethlehem Steel FC	32	12	8	12	46	45	+1	44	Conference Playoffs
9	Orlando City B	32	10	12	10	37	36	+1	42	
10	Ottawa Fury	32	8	14	10	42	41	+1	38	
11	Harrisburg City Islanders	32	10	7	15	28	47	−19	37	
12	Saint Louis FC	32	9	9	14	35	48	−13	36	
13	Pittsburgh Riverhounds	32	8	12	12	33	42	−9	36	
14	Richmond Kickers	32	8	8	16	24	36	−12	32	
15	Toronto FC II	32	6	7	19	27	54	−27	25	

Source: 2017 USL standings
Rules for classification: 1) total wins; 2) total goal differential; 3) total goals scored; 4) points earned against top four Conference finishers; 5) disciplinary points; 6) coin toss or drawing of lots
(C) Champions

Western Conference

Pos	Team	Pld	W	D	L	GF	GA	GD	Pts	Qualification
1	Real Monarchs (X)	32	20	7	5	59	31	+28	67	Conference Playoffs
2	San Antonio FC	32	17	11	4	45	24	+21	62	Conference Playoffs
3	Reno 1868 FC	32	17	8	7	75	39	+36	59	Conference Playoffs
4	Swope Park Rangers	32	17	7	8	55	37	+18	58	Conference Playoffs
5	Phoenix Rising FC	32	17	7	8	50	37	+13	58	Conference Playoffs
6	OKC Energy FC	32	14	7	11	46	41	+5	49	Conference Playoffs
7	Tulsa Roughnecks	32	14	4	14	46	49	−3	46	Conference Playoffs
8	Sacramento Republic	32	13	7	12	45	43	+2	46	Conference Playoffs
9	Colorado Springs Switchbacks	32	12	8	12	55	51	+4	44	
10	Orange County SC	32	11	10	11	43	47	−4	43	
11	Rio Grande Valley Toros	32	9	8	15	37	50	−13	35	
12	Seattle Sounders 2	32	9	4	19	42	61	−19	31	
13	LA Galaxy II	32	8	5	19	32	64	−32	29	
14	Vancouver Whitecaps 2	32	5	9	18	32	52	−20	24	
15	Portland Timbers 2	32	3	6	23	27	63	−36	15	

Source: 2017 USL standings
Rules for classification: 1) total wins; 2) total goal differential; 3) total goals scored; 4) points earned against top four Conference finishers; 5) disciplinary points; 6) coin toss or drawing of lots
(X) Regular Season League Champion

==== Cup Competitions ====
===== US Open Cup =====
====== Final ======
September 20, 2017
19:30 CDT

Sporting Kansas City	2–1	New York Red Bulls
Blessing 25'; Sallói 66'	Report	Wright-Phillips 90+1'

Children's Mercy Park, Kansas City, Kansas
Attendance: 21,523
Referee: Hilario Grajeda (United States)

==== International competitions ====
===== CONCACAF Competitions =====
Club	Competition	Final round
FC Dallas	2016–17 CONCACAF Champions League	Semi-finals
New York Red Bulls	2016–17 CONCACAF Champions League	Quarter-finals
Portland Timbers	2016–17 CONCACAF Champions League	Group Stage
Sporting Kansas City	2016–17 CONCACAF Champions League	Group Stage

====== 2016–17 CONCACAF Quarterfinals ======
Team 1	Agg.	Team 2	1st leg	2nd leg
New York Red Bulls (United States)	1–3	(Canada) Vancouver Whitecaps FC	1–1	0–2
FC Dallas (United States)	5–2	(Panama) Árabe Unido	4–0	1–2

====== 2016–17 CONCACAF Semifinals ======
Team 1	Agg.	Team 2	1st leg	2nd leg
FC Dallas (United States)	3–4	(Mexico) Pachuca	2–1	1–3

=== Women's ===
==== League Competitions ====
===== National Women's Soccer League =====
====== Overall table ======
Pos	Team	Pld	W	D	L	GF	GA	GD	Pts	Qualification
1	North Carolina Courage	24	16	1	7	38	22	+16	49	NWSL Shield
2	Portland Thorns FC (C)	24	14	5	5	37	20	+17	47	NWSL Playoffs
3	Orlando Pride	24	11	7	6	45	31	+14	40	NWSL Playoffs
4	Chicago Red Stars	24	11	6	7	33	30	+3	39	NWSL Playoffs
5	Seattle Reign FC	24	9	7	8	43	37	+6	34	
6	Sky Blue FC	24	10	3	11	42	51	−9	33	
7	FC Kansas City	24	8	7	9	29	31	−2	31	
8	Houston Dash	24	7	3	14	23	39	−16	24	
9	Boston Breakers	24	4	7	13	24	35	−11	19	
10	Washington Spirit	24	5	4	15	30	48	−18	19	

Source: NWSL
Rules for classification: Tiebreakers
(C) Champions

== Honors ==
=== Professional ===
Men
Competition		Winner
U.S. Open Cup		Sporting Kansas City
MLS Supporters' Shield		Toronto FC
MLS Cup		Toronto FC
NASL	Spring season	Miami FC
NASL	Fall season	Miami FC
NASL	Regular season	Miami FC
NASL	Soccer Bowl	San Francisco Deltas
USL	Regular season	Real Monarchs SLC
USL	Playoffs	Louisville City FC

Women
Competition	Winner
NWSL Championship	Portland Thorns FC
NWSL Shield	North Carolina Courage
Women's Premier Soccer League	Fire & Ice SC (Columbia, Illinois)
United Women's Soccer	Grand Rapids FC

=== Amateur ===
Men
Competition	Team
Premier Development League	Charlotte Eagles
National Premier Soccer League	Elm City Express
NCAA Division I Soccer Championship	Stanford University
NCAA Division II Soccer Championship	University of Charleston (WV)
NCAA Division III Soccer Championship	Messiah College
NAIA Soccer Championship	Wayland Baptist (TX)

Women
Competition	Team
NCAA Division I Soccer Championship	Stanford University
NCAA Division II Soccer Championship	University of Central Missouri
NCAA Division III Soccer Championship	Williams College
NAIA Soccer Championship	Spring Arbor (MI)
