= 2017 CONCACAF Gold Cup knockout stage =

The knockout stage of the 2017 CONCACAF Gold Cup began on July 19, 2017, with the quarter-finals and ended on July 26, 2017, with the final in Santa Clara, California.

All match times listed are in EDT (UTC−4). If the venue is located in a different time zone, the local time is also given.

== Format ==
In the quarter-finals and semi-finals, if the scores remained level after 90 minutes the match would have gone directly to a penalty shoot-out, without any extra time being played. For the final, extra time and a penalty shoot-out would have been used to determine the winners if necessary. A fourth substitution would have been allowed during extra time in the final. Unlike the 2015 edition, there was no third-place match.

CONCACAF set out the following matchups for the quarter-finals:

- Match 1: Winners Group A vs Runners-up Group B
- Match 2: Winners Group B vs 3rd Place Group A/C
- Match 3: Winners Group C vs 3rd Place Group A/B
- Match 4: Runners-up Group C vs Runners-up Group A

=== Combinations of matches in the quarter-finals ===
The specific match-ups involving the third-placed teams depended on which two third-placed teams qualified for the quarter-finals:

Combination according to the two qualified teams

Third-placed teams qualify from groups			1B vs	1C vs
A	B		3A	3B
A		C	3C	3A
	B	C	3C	3B

== Qualified teams ==
The top two placed teams from each of the three groups, plus the two best-placed third teams, qualified for the knockout stage.

Group	Winners	Runners-up	Third-placed teams (best two qualified)
A	Costa Rica	Canada	Honduras
B	United States	Panama	—N/a
C	Mexico	Jamaica	El Salvador

== Bracket ==
Quarter-finals
July 19 – Philadelphia
Costa Rica	1
Panama	0
July 19 – Philadelphia
United States	2
El Salvador	0
July 20 – Glendale
Mexico	1
Honduras	0
July 20 – Glendale
Jamaica	2
Canada	1

Semi-finals
July 22 – Arlington
Costa Rica	0
United States	2
July 23 – Pasadena
Mexico	0
Jamaica	1

Final
July 26 – Santa Clara
United States	2
Jamaica	1

== Quarter-finals ==
=== Costa Rica vs Panama ===
July 19, 2017
18:00

Costa Rica	1–0	Panama
Godoy 77' (o.g.)	Report

Lincoln Financial Field, Philadelphia
Attendance: 31,615
Referee: Óscar Moncada (Honduras)

Costa Rica	Panama

GK	18	Patrick Pemberton
CB	24	Kendall Waston
CB	2	Jhonny Acosta
CB	3	Giancarlo González
RWB	6	José Salvatierra
LWB	15	Francisco Calvo
RM	7	David Ramírez	(yellow card) 21'	(substituted off) 65'
CM	20	David Guzmán
CM	17	Yeltsin Tejeda		(substituted off) 86'
LM	10	Bryan Ruiz (c)
CF	21	Marco Ureña
Substitutions:
FW	9	Ariel Rodríguez		(substituted on) 65'	(substituted off) 77'
MF	19	Ulises Segura			(substituted on) 77'
DF	5	Kenner Gutiérrez		(substituted on) 86'
Manager:
Óscar Ramírez

GK	12	José Calderón
RB	2	Michael Amir Murillo
CB	5	Fidel Escobar
CB	23	Roberto Chen
LB	17	Luis Ovalle
DM	6	Gabriel Gómez (c)		(substituted off) 68'
RM	8	Yoel Bárcenas
CM	20	Aníbal Godoy	(yellow card) 75'
CM	11	Armando Cooper		(substituted off) 58'
LM	18	Miguel Camargo		(substituted off) 71'
CF	9	Gabriel Torres
Substitutions:
FW	22	Abdiel Arroyo		(substituted on) 58'
MF	21	Leslie Heráldez		(substituted on) 68'
MF	14	Valentín Pimentel		(substituted on) 71'
Manager:
(Colombia) Hernán Darío Gómez

Man of the Match:
Patrick Pemberton (Costa Rica)

Assistant referees:
Hermenerito Leal (Guatemala)
Melvin Cruz (Honduras)
Fourth official:
Melvin Matamoros (Honduras)

=== United States vs El Salvador ===
July 19, 2017
21:00

United States	2–0	El Salvador
O. Gonzalez 41'; Lichaj 45+2'	Report

Lincoln Financial Field, Philadelphia
Attendance: 31,615
Referee: Drew Fischer (Canada)

United States	El Salvador

GK	24	Tim Howard
RB	15	Eric Lichaj
CB	3	Omar Gonzalez
CB	21	Matt Hedges
LB	16	Justin Morrow
RM	20	Paul Arriola		(substituted off) 66'
CM	26	Michael Bradley (c)
CM	25	Darlington Nagbe	(yellow card) 21'	(substituted off) 87'
LM	28	Clint Dempsey
CF	9	Gyasi Zardes		(substituted off) 71'
CF	27	Jozy Altidore
Substitutions:
FW	8	Jordan Morris		(substituted on) 66'
MF	23	Kellyn Acosta		(substituted on) 71'
MF	7	Chris Pontius		(substituted on) 87'
Manager:
Bruce Arena

GK	18	Derby Carrillo
RB	21	Bryan Tamacas	(yellow card) 83'
CB	4	Henry Romero	(yellow card) 82'
CB	5	Iván Mancía	(yellow card) 18'
LB	13	Alexander Larín	(yellow card) 59'
RM	10	Gerson Mayen		(substituted off) 56'
CM	12	Narciso Orellana
CM	7	Darwin Cerén (c)
LM	8	Denis Pineda		(substituted off) 78'
CF	11	Rodolfo Zelaya
CF	9	Nelson Bonilla		(substituted off) 83'
Substitutions:
MF	16	Óscar Cerén		(substituted on) 56'
FW	19	Edwin Sánchez		(substituted on) 78'
FW	20	Harold Alas		(substituted on) 83'
Manager:
(Colombia) Eduardo Lara

Man of the Match:
Michael Bradley (United States)

Assistant referees:
Marcos Quintero (Mexico)
Ainsley Rochard (Trinidad and Tobago)
Fourth official:
Fernando Guerrero (Mexico)

=== Jamaica vs Canada ===
July 20, 2017
19:30
16:30 MST (UTC−7)

Jamaica	2–1	Canada
Francis 6'; Williams 50'	Report	Hoilett 61'

State Farm Stadium, Glendale
Attendance: 37,404
Referee: Ricardo Montero (Costa Rica)

Jamaica	Canada

GK	1	Andre Blake (c)
RB	5	Alvas Powell
CB	3	Damion Lowe
CB	21	Jermaine Taylor
LB	20	Kemar Lawrence
RM	18	Owayne Gordon
CM	17	Kevon Lambert	(yellow card) 73'	(substituted off) 90+2'
CM	15	Je-Vaughn Watson
LM	7	Shaun Francis		(substituted off) 67'
CF	22	Romario Williams		(substituted off) 81'
CF	10	Darren Mattocks
Substitutions:
FW	11	Cory Burke		(substituted on) 67'
DF	4	Ladale Richie		(substituted on) 81'
MF	12	Michael Binns		(substituted on) 90+2'
Manager:
Theodore Whitmore

GK	18	Milan Borjan
RB	23	Michael Petrasso
CB	19	Steven Vitória	(yellow card) 15'	(substituted off) 56'
CB	5	Dejan Jakovic (c)
LB	17	Marcel de Jong
DM	6	Samuel Piette
DM	7	Russell Teibert
CM	8	Scott Arfield
RF	10	Junior Hoilett
CF	24	Cyle Larin		(substituted off) 56'
LF	12	Alphonso Davies		(substituted off) 82'
Substitutions:
FW	9	Lucas Cavallini		(substituted on) 56'
DF	3	Manjrekar James		(substituted on) 56'
FW	16	Anthony Jackson-Hamel		(substituted on) 82'
Manager:
(Ecuador) Octavio Zambrano

Man of the Match:
Andre Blake (Jamaica)

Assistant referees:
Juan Carlos Mora (Costa Rica)
Keytzel Corrales (Nicaragua)
Fourth official:
Yadel Martínez (Cuba)

=== Mexico vs Honduras ===
July 20, 2017
22:30
19:30 MST (UTC−7)

Mexico	1–0	Honduras
Pizarro 4'	Report

State Farm Stadium, Glendale
Attendance: 37,404
Referee: Walter López (Guatemala)

Mexico	Honduras

GK	1	José de Jesús Corona
RB	6	Edson Álvarez
CB	4	Hugo Ayala (c)
CB	3	Jair Pereira	(yellow card) 90+2'
LB	18	Jesús Gallardo
CM	5	Jesús Molina		(substituted off) 64'
CM	20	Jesús Dueñas
RW	11	Elías Hernández
AM	15	Rodolfo Pizarro		(substituted off) 90+1'
LW	7	Orbelín Pineda
CF	19	Ángel Sepúlveda	(yellow card) 74'	(substituted off) 75'
Substitutions:
DF	2	Luis Rodríguez	(yellow card) 80'	(substituted on) 64'
FW	9	Erick Torres		(substituted on) 75'
DF	17	Raúl López		(substituted on) 90+1'
Manager:
(Colombia) Luis Pompilio Páez

GK	1	Luis López
CB	2	Félix Crisanto
CB	4	Henry Figueroa
CB	5	Éver Alvarado
RM	17	Alberth Elis
CM	8	Alfredo Mejía	(yellow card) 27'
CM	6	Bryan Acosta		(substituted off) 68'
LM	3	Maynor Figueroa (c)
RF	16	Carlos Lanza		(substituted off) 73'
CF	12	Romell Quioto	(yellow card) 7'
LF	23	Carlos Sánchez		(substituted off) 46'
Substitutions:
MF	14	Boniek García	(yellow card) 87'	(substituted on) 46'
MF	13	Sergio Peña		(substituted on) 68'
MF	10	Alexander López		(substituted on) 73'
Manager:
(Colombia) Jorge Luis Pinto

Man of the Match:
Rodolfo Pizarro (Mexico)

Assistant referees:
Gerson López (Guatemala)
Frank Anderson (United States)
Fourth official:
Armando Villarreal (United States)

== Semi-finals ==
=== Costa Rica vs United States ===
July 22, 2017
22:00
21:00 CDT (UTC−5)

Costa Rica	0–2	United States
	Report	Altidore 72'; Dempsey 82'

AT&T Stadium, Arlington
Attendance: 45,516
Referee: Joel Aguilar (El Salvador)

Costa Rica	United States

GK	18	Patrick Pemberton
CB	24	Kendall Waston
CB	2	Jhonny Acosta
CB	3	Giancarlo González	(yellow card) 67'
RWB	6	José Salvatierra		(substituted off) 77'
LWB	15	Francisco Calvo
RM	7	David Ramírez
CM	20	David Guzmán		(substituted off) 80'
CM	17	Yeltsin Tejeda		(substituted off) 74'
LM	10	Bryan Ruiz (c)
CF	21	Marco Ureña
Substitutions:
DF	5	Kenner Gutiérrez		(substituted on) 74'
MF	14	Randall Azofeifa		(substituted on) 77'
FW	25	José Leitón		(substituted on) 80'
Manager:
Óscar Ramírez

GK	24	Tim Howard
RB	19	Graham Zusi
CB	3	Omar Gonzalez	(yellow card) 61'
CB	5	Matt Besler
LB	2	Jorge Villafaña
DM	23	Kellyn Acosta		(substituted off) 85'
CM	26	Michael Bradley (c)
CM	25	Darlington Nagbe
RF	20	Paul Arriola		(substituted off) 66'
CF	27	Jozy Altidore	(yellow card) 73'	(substituted off) 83'
LF	8	Jordan Morris
Substitutions:
FW	28	Clint Dempsey		(substituted on) 66'
FW	9	Gyasi Zardes		(substituted on) 83'
MF	13	Dax McCarty		(substituted on) 85'
Manager:
Bruce Arena

Man of the Match:
Clint Dempsey (United States)

Assistant referees:
Juan Francisco Zumba (El Salvador)
William Torres (El Salvador)
Fourth official:
César Ramos (Mexico)

=== Mexico vs Jamaica ===
July 23, 2017
21:00
18:00 PDT (UTC−7)

Mexico	0–1	Jamaica
	Report	Lawrence 88'

Rose Bowl, Pasadena
Attendance: 42,393
Referee: John Pitti (Panama)

Mexico	Jamaica

GK	1	José de Jesús Corona
CB	6	Edson Álvarez	(yellow card) 25'
CB	3	Jair Pereira
CB	4	Hugo Ayala (c)
DM	20	Jesús Dueñas
CM	15	Rodolfo Pizarro
CM	5	Jesús Molina
AM	8	Érick Gutiérrez		(substituted off) 59'
RW	11	Elías Hernández		(substituted off) 79'
CF	9	Erick Torres	(yellow card) 29'	(substituted off) 46'
LW	7	Orbelín Pineda
Substitutions:
FW	19	Ángel Sepúlveda		(substituted on) 46'
MF	18	Jesús Gallardo		(substituted on) 59'
DF	17	Raúl López		(substituted on) 79'
Manager:
(Colombia) Luis Pompilio Páez

GK	1	Andre Blake (c)
CB	3	Damion Lowe
CB	4	Ladale Richie
CB	21	Jermaine Taylor
RWB	5	Alvas Powell
LWB	20	Kemar Lawrence
CM	18	Owayne Gordon	(yellow card) 80'
CM	15	Je-Vaughn Watson	(yellow card) 72'
CM	7	Shaun Francis	(yellow card) 33'	(substituted off) 53'
CF	22	Romario Williams	(yellow card) 58'	(substituted off) 77'
CF	10	Darren Mattocks		(substituted off) 90+2'
Substitutions:
MF	19	Ricardo Morris		(substituted on) 53'
MF	12	Michael Binns		(substituted on) 77'
DF	6	Sergio Campbell		(substituted on) 90+2'
Manager:
Theodore Whitmore

Man of the Match:
Andre Blake (Jamaica)

Assistant referees:
Gabriel Victoria (Panama)
Christian Ramírez (Honduras)
Fourth official:
Ricardo Montero (Costa Rica)

== Final ==
July 26, 2017
21:30
18:30 PDT (UTC−7)

United States	2–1	Jamaica
Altidore 45'; Morris 88'	Report	Watson 50'

Levi's Stadium, Santa Clara
Attendance: 63,032
Referee: Walter López (Guatemala)

United States	Jamaica

GK	24	Tim Howard	(yellow card) 90+2'
RB	19	Graham Zusi	(yellow card) 76'
CB	3	Omar Gonzalez
CB	5	Matt Besler
LB	2	Jorge Villafaña
DM	23	Kellyn Acosta	(yellow card) 37'	(substituted off) 55'
CM	26	Michael Bradley (c)
CM	25	Darlington Nagbe		(substituted off) 90+1'
RF	20	Paul Arriola		(substituted off) 76'
CF	27	Jozy Altidore
LF	8	Jordan Morris
Substitutions:
MF	28	Clint Dempsey		(substituted on) 55'
FW	9	Gyasi Zardes		(substituted on) 76'
MF	13	Dax McCarty		(substituted on) 90+1'
Manager:
Bruce Arena

GK	1	Andre Blake (c)		(substituted off) 23'
CB	3	Damion Lowe
CB	4	Ladale Richie	(yellow card) 57'	(substituted off) 87'
CB	21	Jermaine Taylor
RWB	5	Alvas Powell
LWB	20	Kemar Lawrence
CM	8	Oniel Fisher
CM	15	Je-Vaughn Watson
CM	18	Owayne Gordon
CF	22	Romario Williams
CF	10	Darren Mattocks	(yellow card) 32'	(substituted off) 90'
Substitutions:
GK	13	Dwayne Miller		(substituted on) 23'
MF	17	Kevon Lambert		(substituted on) 87'
FW	11	Cory Burke		(substituted on) 90'
Manager:
Theodore Whitmore

Man of the Match:
Jordan Morris (United States)

Assistant referees:
Gerson López (Guatemala)
Hermenerito Leal (Guatemala)
Fourth official:
Ricardo Montero (Costa Rica)
