= 2017 CONCACAF Gold Cup final =

Men's association football championship match

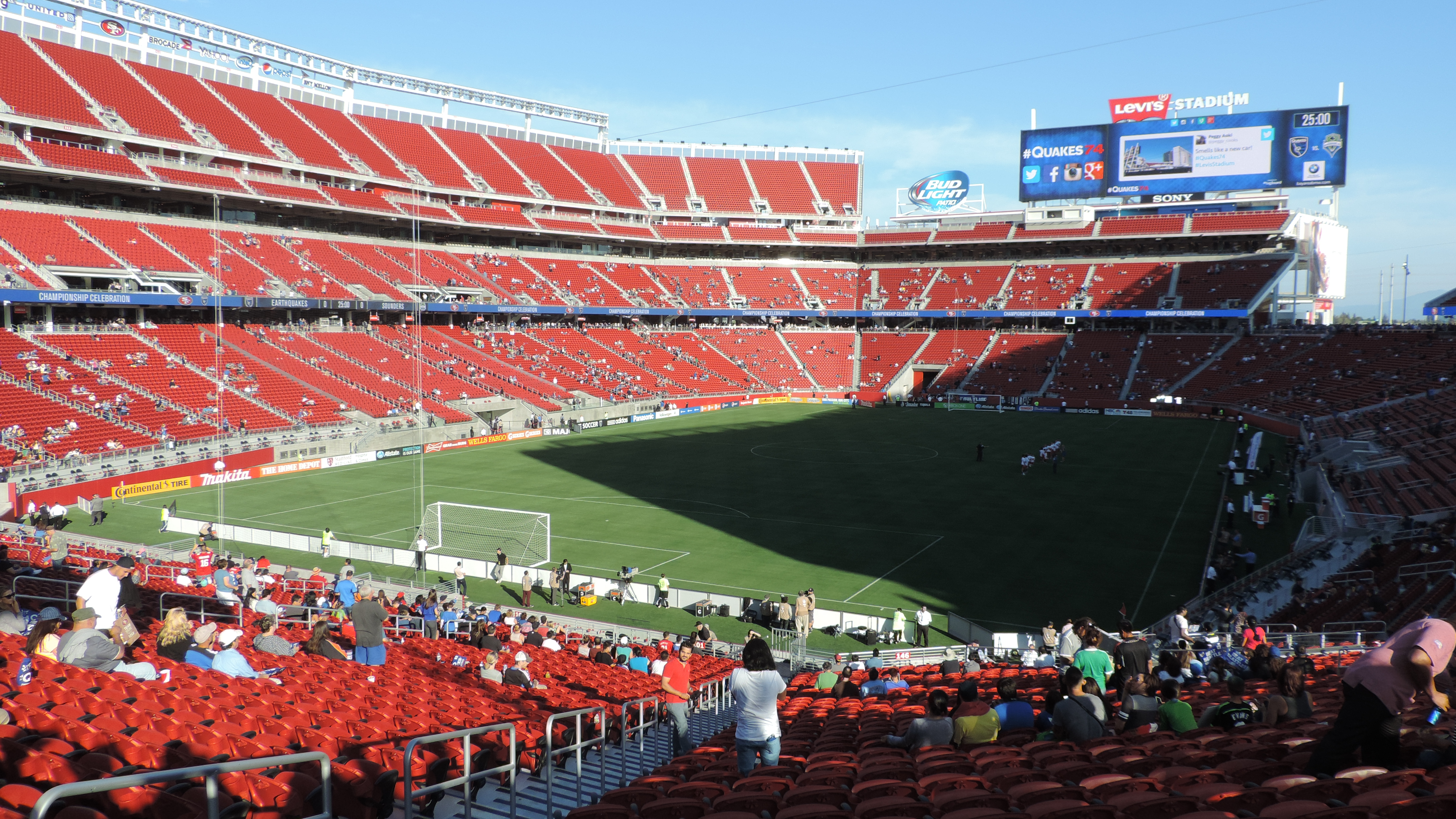
- Levi's Stadium in Santa Clara hosted the final.
- Event: 2017 CONCACAF Gold Cup
United States	Jamaica
(United States)	(Jamaica)
2	1
- Date: July 26, 2017
- Venue: Levi's Stadium, Santa Clara, California
- Man of the Match: Jordan Morris (United States)
- Referee: Walter López (Guatemala)
- Attendance: 63,032
- Weather: Sunny; 79 °F (26 °C); 47% humidity

The 2017 CONCACAF Gold Cup final was a soccer match which determined the winners of the 2017 CONCACAF Gold Cup. The match was held at Levi's Stadium in Santa Clara, California, United States, on July 26, 2017, and was contested by the United States and Jamaica.

The United States won the final 2–1 for their sixth CONCACAF Gold Cup title.

== Route to the final ==
United States
Round
Jamaica
Opponents
Result
Group stage
Opponents
Result
Panama
1–1
Match 1
Curaçao
2–0
Martinique
3–2
Match 2
Mexico
0–0
Nicaragua
3–0
Match 3
El Salvador
1–1
Group B winners

Pos	Team	Pld	Pts
1	United States (H)	3	7
2	Panama	3	7
3	Martinique	3	3
4	Nicaragua	3	0

Source: CONCACAF
(H) Hosts
Final standings
Group C runners-up

Pos	Team	Pld	Pts
1	Mexico	3	7
2	Jamaica	3	5
3	El Salvador	3	4
4	Curaçao	3	0

Source: CONCACAF
Opponents
Result
Knockout stage
Opponents
Result
El Salvador
2–0
Quarter-finals
Canada
2–1
Costa Rica
2–0
Semi-finals
Mexico
1–0

== Match ==
=== Summary ===
Jozy Altidore opened the scoring for the U.S. in the last minute of the first half with a free-kick from 30 yards which went over the wall and into the top left corner of the net with his right foot.

Jamaica equalized in the 50th minute from Je-Vaughn Watson after he met a corner from the right on the volley with his right foot at the back post from five yards out. With two minutes to go, Jordan Morris got the winning goal with a right foot shot to the right corner of the net from fifteen yards out after the ball broke to him in the penalty area.

=== Details ===
July 26, 2017
18:30 PDT

United States	2–1	Jamaica
Altidore 45'; Morris 88'	Report	Watson 50'

Levi's Stadium, Santa Clara
Attendance: 63,032
Referee: Walter López (Guatemala)

United States	Jamaica

GK	24	Tim Howard	(yellow card) 90+2'
RB	19	Graham Zusi	(yellow card) 76'
CB	3	Omar Gonzalez
CB	5	Matt Besler
LB	2	Jorge Villafaña
DM	23	Kellyn Acosta	(yellow card) 37'	(substituted off) 55'
CM	26	Michael Bradley (c)
CM	25	Darlington Nagbe		(substituted off) 90+1'
RF	20	Paul Arriola		(substituted off) 76'
CF	27	Jozy Altidore
LF	8	Jordan Morris
Substitutions:
MF	28	Clint Dempsey		(substituted on) 55'
FW	9	Gyasi Zardes		(substituted on) 76'
MF	13	Dax McCarty		(substituted on) 90+1'
Manager:
Bruce Arena

GK	1	Andre Blake (c)		(substituted off) 23'
CB	3	Damion Lowe
CB	4	Ladale Richie	(yellow card) 57'	(substituted off) 87'
CB	21	Jermaine Taylor
RWB	5	Alvas Powell
LWB	20	Kemar Lawrence
CM	8	Oniel Fisher
CM	15	Je-Vaughn Watson
CM	18	Owayne Gordon
CF	22	Romario Williams
CF	10	Darren Mattocks	(yellow card) 32'	(substituted off) 90'
Substitutions:
GK	13	Dwayne Miller		(substituted on) 23'
MF	17	Kevon Lambert		(substituted on) 87'
FW	11	Cory Burke		(substituted on) 90'
Manager:
Theodore Whitmore

Man of the Match:
Jordan Morris (United States)

Assistant referees:
Gerson López (Guatemala)
Hermenerito Leal (Guatemala)
Fourth official:
Ricardo Montero (Costa Rica)

Match rules

- 90 minutes.
- 30 minutes of extra time if necessary.
- Penalty shoot-out if scores still level.
- Maximum of three substitutions, with a fourth allowed in extra time.
