= Ladale Richie =

Jamaican footballer (born 1989)

Personal information
- Full name: Ladale Osagie Richie
- Date of birth: 30 July 1989 (age 37)
- Place of birth: Clark's Town, Jamaica
- Height: 1.79 m (5 ft 10 in)
- Position: Central defender

Team information
- Current team: Mount Pleasant Football Academy
- Number: 3

Senior career*
| Years | Team | Apps | (Gls) |
| 2009–2012 | Village United | | |
| 2012–2018 | Montego Bay United | 158 | (2) |
| 2018– | Mount Pleasant Football Academy | 50 | (0) |

International career^{‡}
| 2016– | Jamaica | 19 | (0) |
Medal record
Men's football
Representing Jamaica
CONCACAF Gold Cup
| Runner-up | 2017 United States | Team |
- * Club domestic league appearances and goals as of 10:12, 14 June 2021 (UTC) ‡ National team caps and goals as of 10:12, 14 June 2021 (UTC)

Ladale Osagie Richie (born 30 July 1989) is a Jamaican international footballer who plays for Mount Pleasant Football Academy, as a central defender.

== Club career ==
Born in Clark's Town, Richie has played club football for Village United, Montego Bay United and Mount Pleasant Football Academy. He served as captain of Mount Pleasant.

== International career ==
He was first called up to the Jamaican national team in September 2015, making his international debut in 2016. In August 2017 new national team coach Theodore Whitmore announced his intention to utilise more locally based players, including Richie. in August 2018 he became the new national team captain.

== Honors ==
=== Montego Bay United ===
- Jamaica Premier League: 2015-16, runner-up: 2014-15
