= Michael Bradley (soccer) =

American soccer player (born 1987)

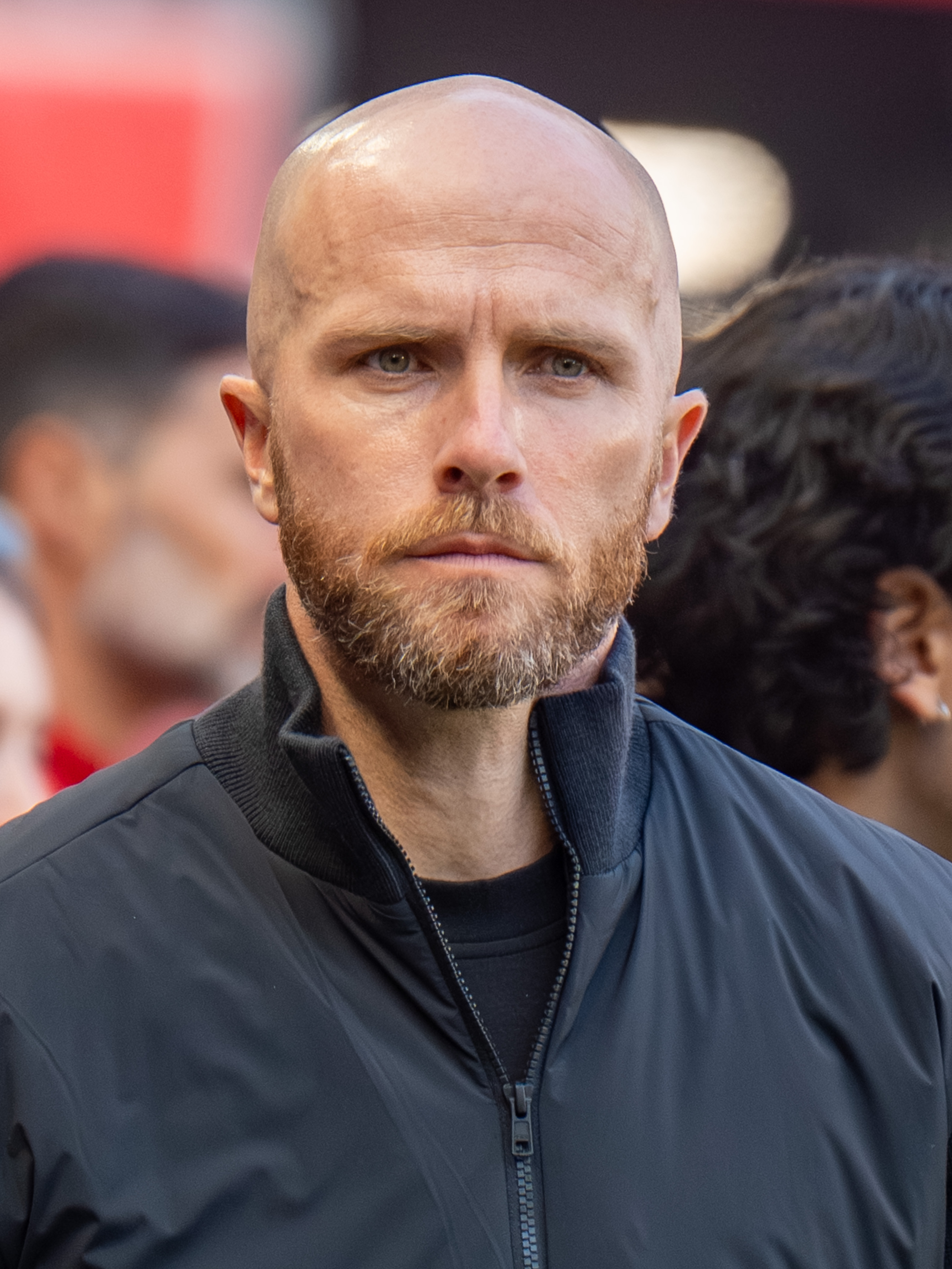
- Bradley in 2026

Personal information
- Full name: Michael Sheehan Bradley
- Date of birth: July 31, 1987 (age 39)
- Place of birth: Princeton, New Jersey, United States
- Height: 6 ft 1 in (1.85 m)
- Position: Central midfielder

Team information
- Current team: New York Red Bulls (head coach)

Youth career
- Chicago Sockers
- 2002–2004: IMG Academy

Senior career*
Years	Team	Apps	(Gls)
2004–2005	MetroStars	30	(1)
2006–2008	Heerenveen	55	(15)
2008–2011	Borussia Mönchengladbach	76	(10)
2011	→ Aston Villa (loan)	3	(0)
2011–2012	Chievo	35	(1)
2012–2014	Roma	41	(2)
2014–2023	Toronto FC	258	(16)
Total		498	(45)

International career
2002–2004	United States U17	6	(0)
2004	United States U18	1	(0)
2004–2007	United States U20	8	(1)
2008	United States U23	4	(0)
2006–2019	United States	151	(17)

Managerial career
- 2025: New York Red Bulls II
- 2025–: New York Red Bulls
Medal record
Representing United States
Men's soccer
FIFA Confederations Cup
Runner-up	2009 South Africa
CONCACAF Gold Cup
Winner	2007 United States
Winner	2017 United States
Runner-up	2011 United States
Runner-up	2019 U.S.–Costa Rica–Jamaica
CONCACAF Cup
Runner-up	2015 United States
- * Club domestic league appearances and goals

Michael Sheehan Bradley (born July 31, 1987) is an American former professional soccer player who is currently the head coach of the New York Red Bulls in Major League Soccer.

The son of soccer coach Bob Bradley, Michael began his professional career in Major League Soccer with the MetroStars in 2004. He then spent several years in Europe, playing in the Dutch Eredivisie with Heerenveen, German Bundesliga with Borussia Mönchengladbach, English Premier League with Aston Villa, and Italian Serie A with both Chievo and Roma. He returned to MLS with Toronto FC in 2014, making over 300 total appearances and lifting the MLS Cup as captain in 2017, before retiring with the club in 2023.

A former captain of the United States national team, Bradley made over 150 international appearances between his senior debut in 2006 and 2019. He was selected to the squad for several major tournaments, including five CONCACAF Gold Cups and two FIFA World Cups, winning two of the former. He was also a member of the sides that finished runners-up at the 2009 FIFA Confederations Cup and reached the semi-finals of the Copa América Centenario.

== Early life ==
Bradley was born in Princeton, New Jersey, son to Bob Bradley, former coach of the United States national team and Los Angeles FC. While his father was the head soccer coach at Princeton University, the family lived in Pennington, New Jersey.

Michael spent his teenage years in Palatine, Illinois while his father coached the Chicago Fire of Major League Soccer (MLS), and he grew up playing for Sockers FC, who went to the 2002 National Championships and finished third. He later attended the United States Under-17 Men's National Team Residency Program in Bradenton, Florida – the dedicated facility for the training of the under-17 national team – for four semesters, from 2002 to 2004. As a child, he idolized Roy Keane, a renowned midfielder for Manchester United and the Republic of Ireland.

== Club career ==
=== MetroStars ===
Before leaving Bradenton, Bradley signed a Project-40 contract with MLS, turning professional at the age of sixteen, and entered the 2004 MLS SuperDraft, where he was selected thirty-sixth overall by the MetroStars, who at the time were coached by his father. Bradley did not see any playing time in his rookie season, missing out with a foot injury, but went on to gain a starting spot in 2005, playing 30 out of 32 matches for the Metro. Just weeks after his father was fired as the club's coach, he headed in his first professional goal in a victory over Chivas USA on the last day of the 2005 season, sending the team to the playoffs.

=== SC Heerenveen ===
In January 2006, Bradley became the youngest MLS player to ever be sold when he was transferred to Heerenveen for $250,000 and a portion of any sell-on fee. His first start for the Dutch club came on April 16, 2006, in a match against AZ. He found success early, earning five starts and helping the club to a coveted UEFA Cup spot in his first half-season. Upon the retirement of Paul Bosvelt after the 2006–07 season, Bradley took the veteran's starting place in central midfield. Bradley scored sixteen Eredivisie goals and twenty in all competitions during the 2007–08 season.

In January 2008, Bradley broke the record for the most goals scored in a single season by an American soccer player playing in a European first division, which was previously held by Brian McBride with his thirteen goals for Fulham in the Premier League. On January 26, 2008, Bradley extended his record to eighteen, with sixteen league goals.

=== Borussia Mönchengladbach ===
==== 2008–2011 ====
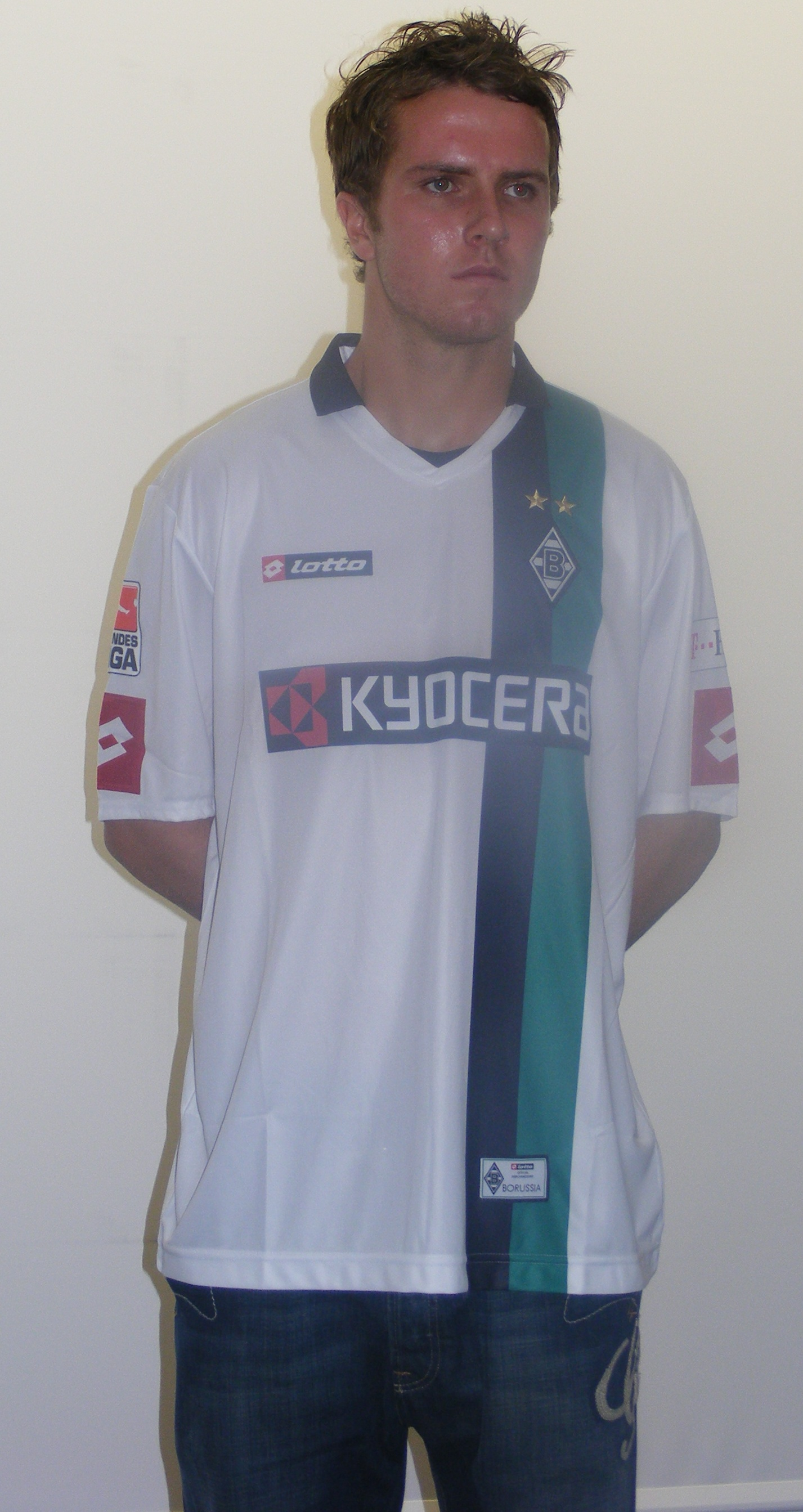
Bradley with Borussia Mönchengladbach in 2008

On August 31, 2008, Bradley signed a four-year deal with Bundesliga side Borussia Mönchengladbach for an undisclosed fee. It was later revealed that Bradley had agreed to a switch to English club Birmingham City on the condition that the club retained its Premier League status. However, they did not and he made his Gladbach debut on September 20 in a loss against Hertha Berlin. On November 15, 2008, Bradley scored his first goal for Mönchengladbach against Bundesliga powerhouse Bayern Munich with an eighty-first minute equalizing header. The game ended 2–2.

Early in the 2009–10 season, Bradley was briefly suspended after an argument with manager Michael Frontzeck over playing time. However, the two later reconciled and Bradley re-established himself as a starter with the club before assisting a goal against Bayern Munich with a one-touch volley pass, and scoring the winning goal on a low free kick against Hannover 96. On January 30, 2011, Aston Villa of the Premier League confirmed via their official website that they were in talks to sign Bradley on a loan deal until the end of the 2010–11 season.

==== Loan to Aston Villa ====
Bradley completed the loan deal to Aston Villa on January 31, 2011. Bradley was paraded in front of the fans at Villa Park on February 5 before kick off of the Premier League match against Fulham. On February 12, Bradley made his Aston Villa debut, coming on in the second half after Jean Makoun was sent off. It was said that Bradley would not join Villa on a permanent basis after Alex McLeish declined to extend his contract. He made only three Premier League appearances and one FA Cup appearance.

=== Chievo ===
Bradley joined Italian Serie A club Chievo on August 31, 2011. He made his Chievo debut on September 18, coming on in the second half for Paolo Sammarco. He has been nicknamed "The General" by the local fans. Bradley scored his first goal in Italian soccer in a 3–2 victory over Catania on April 7 to take his side up to ninth in the league standings.

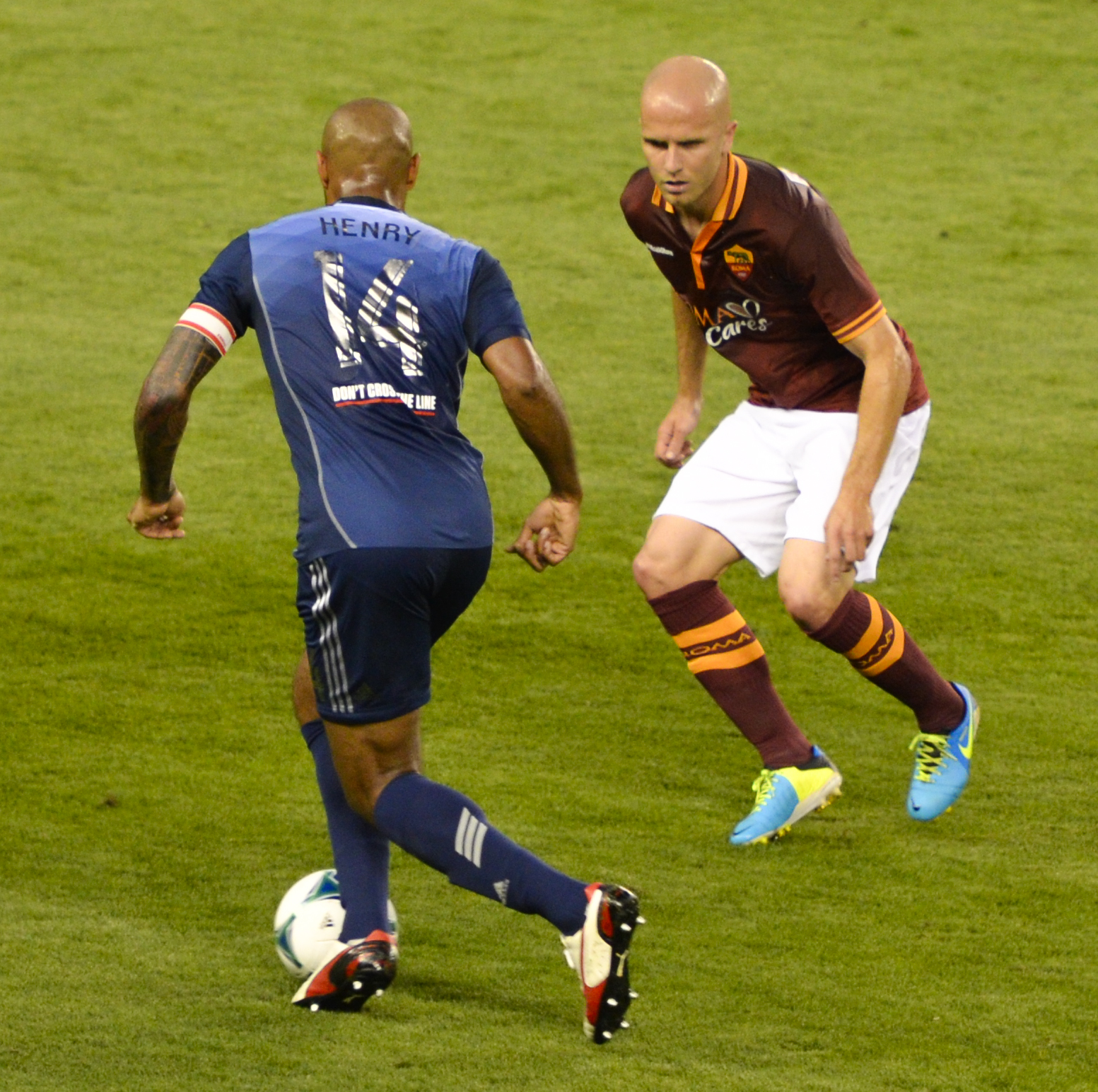
Bradley defending for Roma against Thierry Henry of MLS All-Stars in 2013.

=== Roma ===
On July 16, 2012, Bradley joined Roma, signing a four-year contract for a transfer fee of €3.75 million. The following day, he made his debut for Roma as a starter in a 2–1 pre-season victory against Austrian Bundesliga club Rapid Wien, going head-to-head with fellow U.S. international Terrence Boyd. On July 25, Bradley scored his first goal for his new club in a friendly against Liverpool at Fenway Park in Boston. On August 19, Bradley scored his second pre-season goal against Greek club Aris. On August 26, Bradley made his league debut as a starter for Roma in their 2–2 draw against Catania; he picked up the assist in Roma's game-tying goal in the 90th minute. On October 7, in his first game back after a month-long groin injury, Bradley scored his first goal for the Giallorossi in Roma's 2–0 win over Atalanta.

In late January 2013, Bradley received praise from freelance writer for ESPN.com Michael Cox, stating that Serie A were choosing midfielders like Bradley who "epitomize[d] the new breed of Serie A midfielder, who's all about energy and hard running, rather than the typical number 10." On May 26 of that year, Bradley started in midfield for Roma as the club fell 1–0 to Rome rivals Lazio in the final of the Coppa Italia.

On September 6, Bradley was sidelined due to an injury he suffered on national team duty against Costa Rica. He returned to action for Roma on October 27, where he scored a goal against Udinese, the only goal either side scored during the match.

=== Toronto FC ===
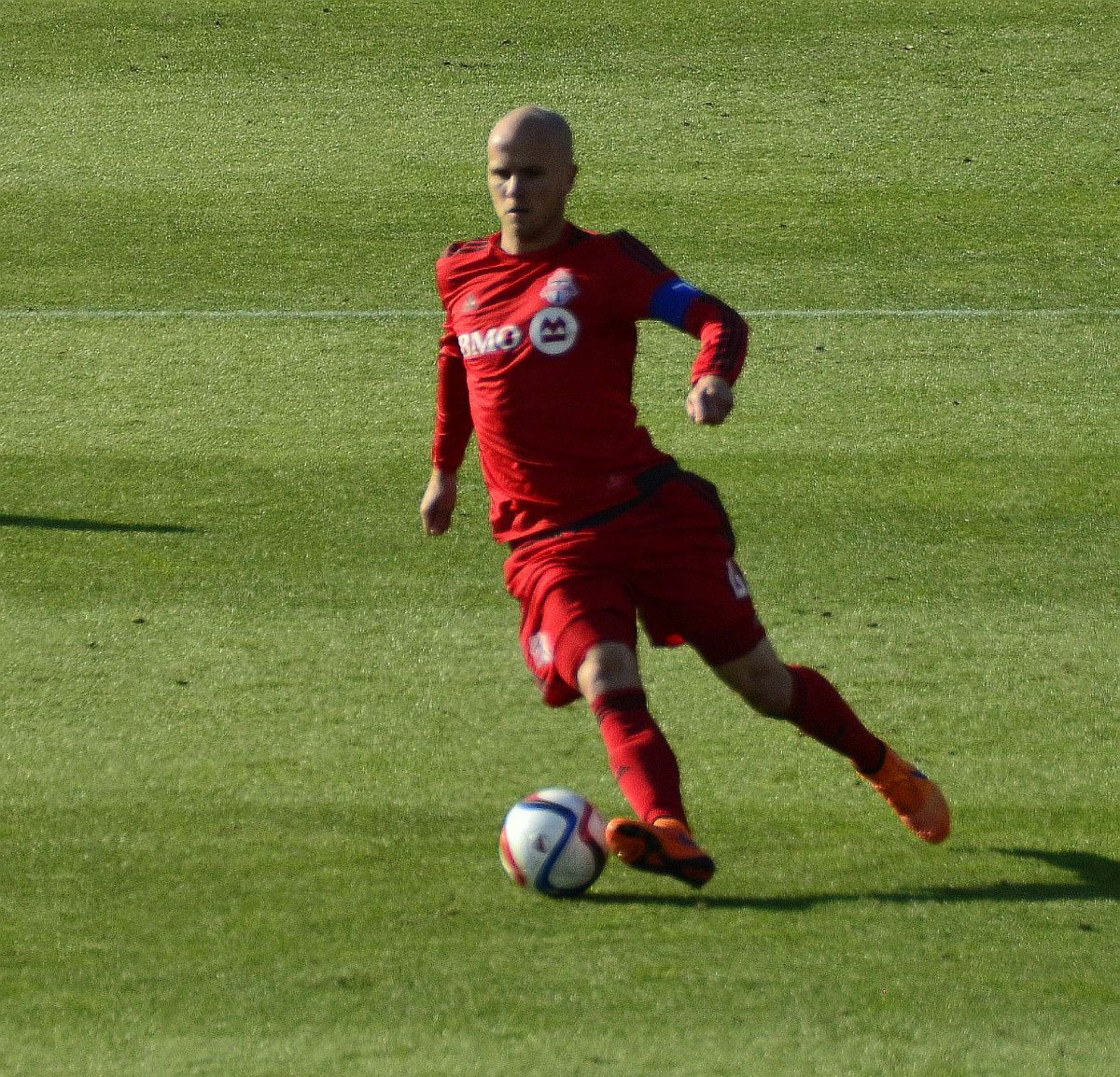
Bradley playing for Toronto in 2015

On January 9, 2014, Roma announced the sale of Bradley to Toronto FC of Major League Soccer for $10 million. As part of the transfer, the two clubs agreed to a partnership including two friendly matches at BMO Field over six years, and a player development program for Toronto FC players at Roma's training facility.

Bradley made his debut with Toronto in their season opener at Seattle Sounders FC on March 15, 2014, the game ended in a 2–1 away victory with both goals coming from newly acquired Jermain Defoe. He scored his first goal for Toronto three weeks later on April 5 against the Columbus Crew, a game which ended in a 2–0 away victory.

He was named captain prior to the 2015 season.

Bradley captained and scored once for Toronto FC in the 2016 Eastern Conference Finals in a derby against Montreal Impact in which Toronto won on an aggregated score of 7–5, to take Toronto FC to the MLS Cup Final for the first time in their history. On December 10, 2016, Toronto lost the final at home to Seattle Sounders FC 5–4 in penalty shoot-out following a goalless draw after extra-time in which Seattle had no shots on target; Bradley missed Toronto's second penalty.

The arrival of Spanish playmaker Victor Vázquez in midfield at the beginning of the 2017 season saw less of a burden placed on Bradley and star forward Sebastian Giovinco to create goalscoring opportunities for Toronto; furthermore, Greg Vanney's switch in tactics from a 4–4–2 diamond to a 3–5–2 formation often saw Bradley occupy more of a supporting role in midfield, which left the Spaniard free to take on the majority of playmaking duties, although the midfield duo often switched positions and effectively shared the team's defensive and creative responsibilities, forming a notable partnership throughout the season. On June 27, Toronto defeated Montreal 2–1 at home in the second leg of the 2017 Canadian Championship final to capture the title for the second consecutive season, edging Montreal 3–2 on aggregate. On September 30, 2017, Bradley won his first Supporters' Shield with a 4–2 home win over New York Red Bulls, to clinch top of the league with the most points that season. On December 9, 2017, Bradley helped Toronto defeat Seattle 2–0 in the 2017 MLS Cup at BMO Field, to lift the title for the first time in the club's history, and complete an unprecedented domestic treble.

After a 2–1 home loss to Guadalajara on April 18, in the first leg of the 2018 CONCACAF Champions League Finals, Toronto managed a 2–1 away win in the return leg on April 25, which took the match straight to penalty shoot-out; Bradley missed the decisive spot kick as Toronto lost the shoot-out 4–2.

On March 2, 2019, Bradley scored a brace for Toronto in their 3–1 win away against Philadelphia Union to kick off Toronto FC's regular Major League Soccer season. He made his 200th appearance for the club on November 10, a 3–1 away defeat to Seattle Sounders in the 2019 MLS Cup Final.

At the beginning of 2020, he had ankle surgery and was expected to miss a significant portion of the season. However, due to the COVID-19 pandemic interrupting the MLS season, he only missed two games and was able to return upon the league restart in the MLS is Back Tournament.

In 2022, Bradley scored a brace against Charlotte FC in a 4–0 home win that saw the debuts of Lorenzo Insigne and Federico Bernardeschi, both of whom assisted on Bradley's goals. The performance led Bradley to be voted MLS Player of the Week.

On October 17, 2023, Bradley announced that he would retire from professional soccer following Toronto FC's season-ending match held four days later.

== International career ==
In May 2006, Bradley was brought into the United States national team's training camp prior to the 2006 FIFA World Cup. While not a member of the World Cup squad or an alternate, Bradley was on the roster for the three send-off friendlies played before the tournament. He earned his first cap in the May 26 match against Venezuela in Cleveland.

In late 2006, Bob Bradley, Michael's father, was hired as head coach of the national team, and Michael would establish himself as a key player for the U.S. during his father's tenure. Bradley earned his first international start on March 28, 2007, during a friendly against Guatemala. He was a starter at the 2007 CONCACAF Gold Cup and helped lead the U.S. to the title, though he was sent off for a late tackle in their semi-final win against Canada. The next month, he started every match for the U.S. at the 2007 FIFA U-20 World Cup, where he scored the game-winning goal in the 107th minute against Uruguay in the round of 16. He scored his first senior international goal on October 17, 2007, with a game-winner in the 87th minute against Switzerland in a friendly in Basel. Following these performances, Bradley was named U.S. Soccer's Young Athlete of the Year for 2007. On February 11, 2009, facing Mexico in Columbus for a 2010 World Cup qualifier, Bradley scored both goals of a 2–0 U.S. victory.

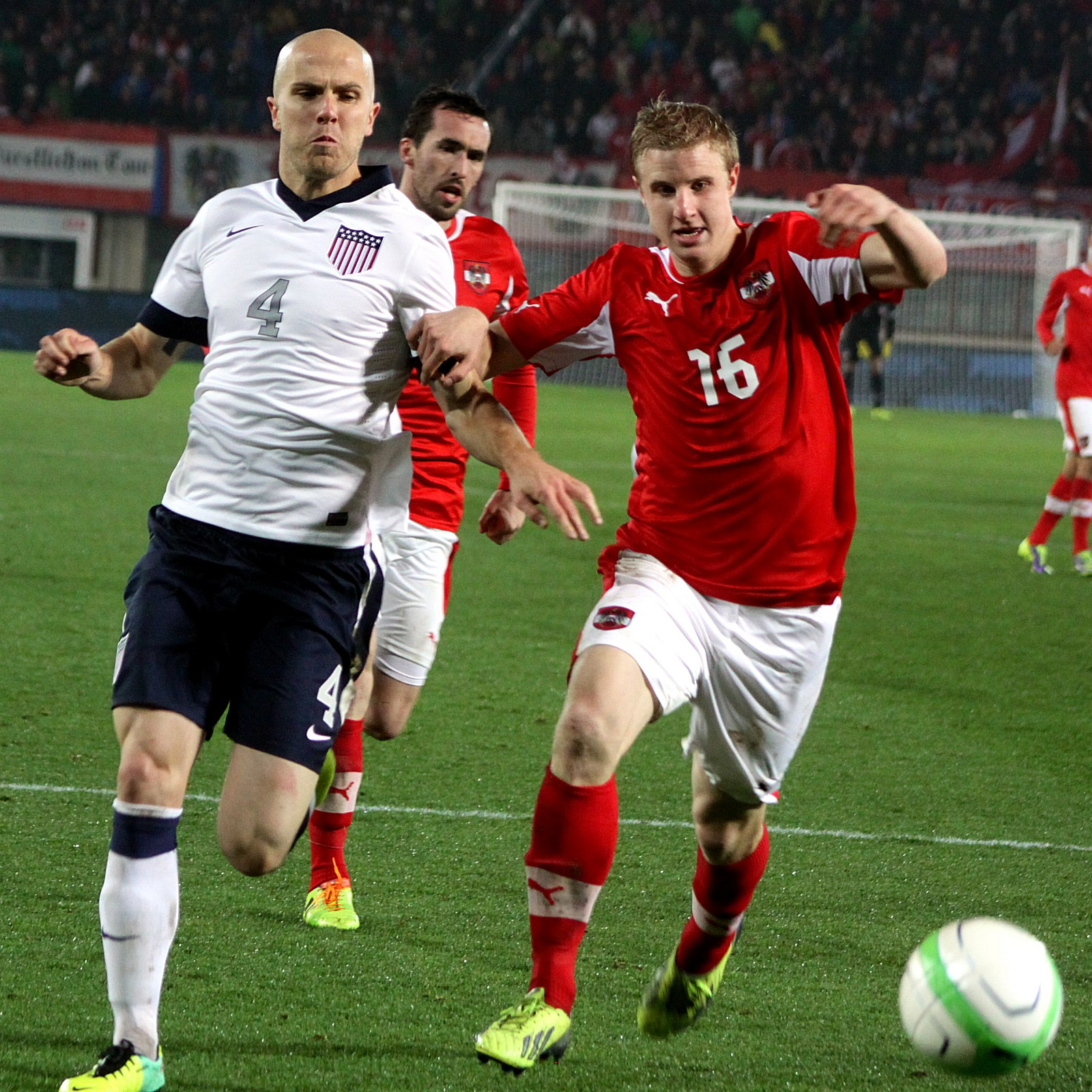
Bradley (left) and Austria's Martin Hinteregger in November 2013

During the United States' surprise run to the final of the 2009 FIFA Confederations Cup, Bradley scored the second goal against Egypt off an assist from Landon Donovan, helping the Americans advance to the semi-final on goal differential after beating the Egyptians 3–0. He started in the 2–0 upset victory against Spain in the semi-finals, but was sent off late in the game. The resulting suspension kept Bradley out of the tournament final, which the U.S. lost 3–2 to Brazil. Bradley was later reported to have confronted referee Jorge Larrionda following the match, resulting in him receiving an additional three-match suspension to be served during the 2009 Gold Cup.

Bradley was a key player for the U.S. at the 2010 World Cup in South Africa, starting all four matches in central midfield. In the group stage, he scored the equalizer in a comeback 2–2 draw against Slovenia. He captained the national team for the first time in an August 10, 2010 friendly against Brazil, played in his birthplace of New Jersey. At the 2011 Gold Cup, Bradley featured in each game, forming a new midfield partnership with Jermaine Jones, and scored the opening goal in the final against Mexico, though the Americans went on to lose 4–2.

Following the Gold Cup loss, Bob Bradley was fired as national team coach and replaced by Jürgen Klinsmann, under whom Michael remained a key starter in midfield. He started each game for the U.S. as they reached the last 16 at the 2014 World Cup in Brazil. After Clint Dempsey had his captaincy removed as punishment for a controversial incident with a referee, Klinsmann named Bradley the national team's new permanent captain ahead of the 2015 Gold Cup. In the United States' opening tournament game against Honduras on July 7, Bradley earned his 100th international cap at the age of 27. Bradley would also captain the U.S. as they hosted the centennial Copa América in 2016, reaching the semi-finals.

Although not initially included in the final squad for the 2017 Gold Cup, Bradley would be one of six alternate players later added to the U.S. roster for the knockout stage. Bradley went on to play every minute of the United States' three knockout games, lifting his second Gold Cup title after they defeated Jamaica in the final. For his performances, Bradley was awarded the Golden Ball, recognizing him as the best player of the tournament.

Bradley was a mainstay of the United States' 2018 World Cup qualification campaign, and would score the opener in a crucial match against Mexico at the Azteca Stadium on June 11, 2017, chipping an effort over goalkeeper Guillermo Ochoa from roughly 40 yards out to help the Americans earn a 1–1 draw. However, after a shock defeat to Trinidad and Tobago on October 10, the United States failed to qualify for the World Cup for the first time since 1986. Bradley was one of several senior players to receive extensive criticism from American media and fans, citing his subpar performances and a lack of leadership shown as captain of the team. After returning to club duty with Toronto FC, both Bradley and fellow national teammate Jozy Altidore would routinely be booed and jeered by opposition fans when playing MLS games in American stadiums.

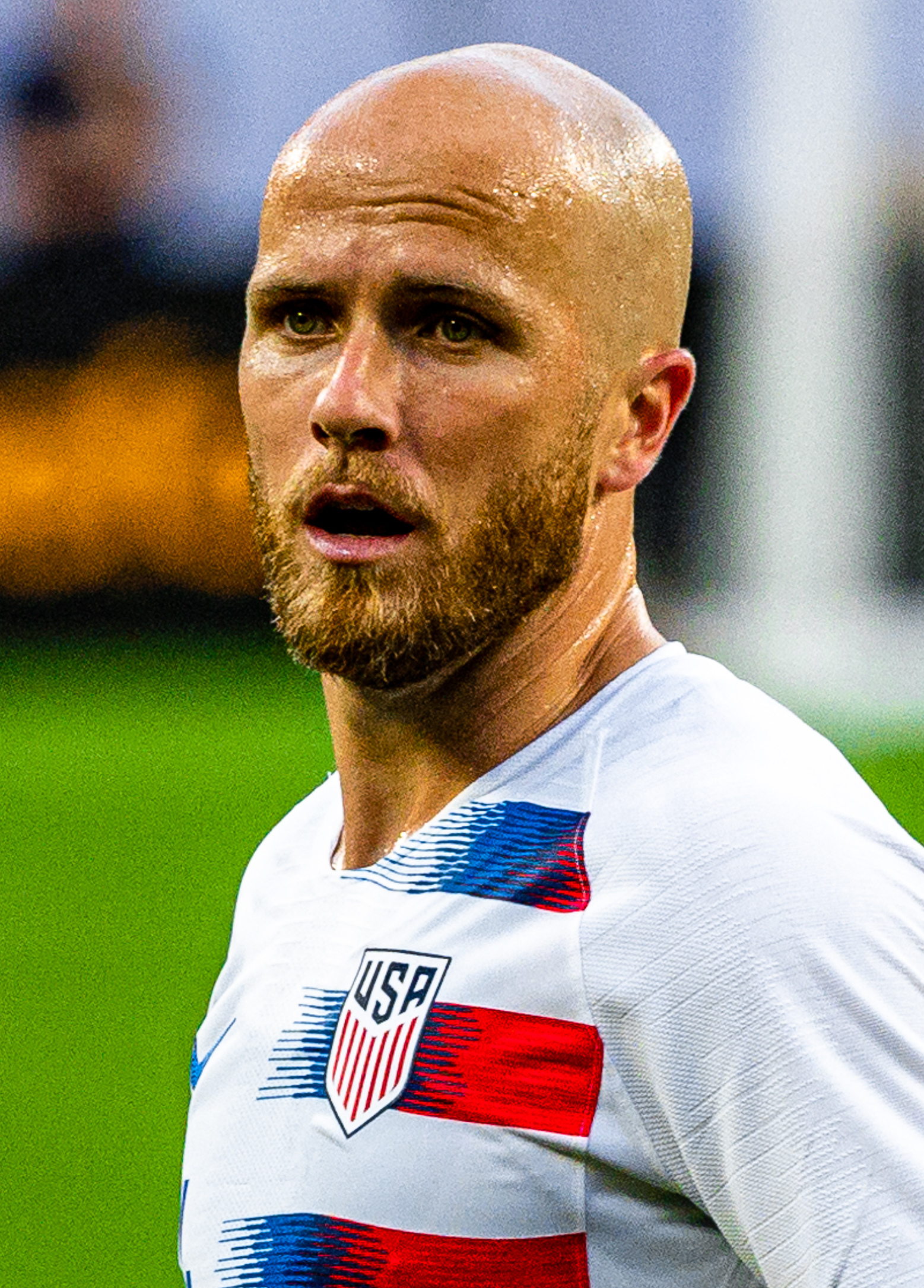
Bradley with the United States at the 2019 CONCACAF Gold Cup

On July 7, 2019, Bradley played the full 90 minutes as the U.S. lost the final of the 2019 Gold Cup by a single goal to Mexico. The match made him the third American to reach 150 international caps, after Cobi Jones and Landon Donovan. Bradley made his 151st and final appearance for the national team on October 15, 2019, in a 2–0 Nations League loss to Canada.

== Style of play ==
A hard-working, intelligent, and physically imposing right-footed player, Bradley was capable of playing in several midfield roles, and was used in the center, in a holding role, in a box-to-box role, in the hole, or even in a more withdrawn creative role as a deep-lying playmaker. He was also utilized as a central defender on occasion. Bradley's tenacity, ball-winning abilities, energy, tactical intelligence, and positional sense enabled him to recover the ball and quickly transition from defense to attack by making forward runs, while his vision and range of passing allowed him to dictate the tempo of his team's play in midfield or create goalscoring opportunities after retrieving possession. In addition to his stamina and playing ability, he was also known for his communication and leadership skills.

== Coaching career ==
On October 23, 2023, Stabæk Fotball announced that Bradley would become an assistant coach. He reunited with his father, who was head coach of the club at the time.

In June 2025, he joined the Canada national team as a guest assistant coach for their matches during the June international window.

On June 12, 2025, Bradley was named the new head coach of New York Red Bulls II in MLS Next Pro, leading them to their first-ever MLS Next Pro championship.

On December 15, 2025, Bradley was announced as the new head coach of the New York Red Bulls in Major League Soccer.

== Personal life ==
Bradley speaks fluent Italian, Dutch, German, and Spanish in addition to his native English. He is married to Amanda, a former University of Rhode Island tennis player. The couple have a son and a daughter, born in 2012 and 2014 respectively.

Bradley's father, Bob, managed sides including the United States men's national team and Toronto FC for a brief period while his son was captain of the club. Scott Bradley, the younger brother of Bob and uncle of Michael, played as a catcher in Major League Baseball, primarily for the Seattle Mariners, and served as long-time coach of the Princeton Tigers. Michael Bradley's sister married the Australian-born soccer player Andy Rose.

== Career statistics ==
=== Club ===
Appearances and goals by club, season and competition
Club	Season	League			Playoffs		National cup		Continental		Other		Total	
Club	Season	Division	Apps	Goals	Apps	Goals	Apps	Goals	Apps	Goals	Apps	Goals	Apps	Goals
MetroStars	2004	Major League Soccer	0	0	0	0	0	0	—		—		0	0
MetroStars	2005	Major League Soccer	30	1	2	0	0	0	—		—		32	1
MetroStars	Total		30	1	2	0	0	0	—		—		32	1
Heerenveen	2005–06	Eredivisie	1	0	—		0	0	—		4 (Note: Appearances in Eredivisie European play-offs)	0	5	0
Heerenveen	2006–07	Eredivisie	21	0	—		0	0	4 (Note: Appearances in UEFA Cup)	0	2	0	27	0
Heerenveen	2007–08	Eredivisie	33	15	—		2	2	2	2	3	0	40	19
Heerenveen	Total		55	15	—		2	2	6	2	9	0	72	19
Borussia Mönchengladbach	2008–09	Bundesliga	28	5	—		0	0	—		—		28	5
Borussia Mönchengladbach	2009–10	Bundesliga	29	2	—		2	0	—		—		31	2
Borussia Mönchengladbach	2010–11	Bundesliga	19	3	—		3	1	—		0	0	22	4
Borussia Mönchengladbach	Total		76	10	—		5	1	—		0	0	81	11
Aston Villa (loan)	2010–11	Premier League	3	0	—		1	0	—		0	0	4	0
Chievo	2011–12	Serie A	35	1	—		1	0	—		—		36	1
Roma	2012–13	Serie A	30	1	—		5	0	—		—		35	1
Roma	2013–14	Serie A	11	1	—		0	0	—		—		11	1
Roma	Total		41	2	—		5	0	—		—		46	2
Toronto FC	2014	Major League Soccer	25	2	—		2	1	—		—		27	3
Toronto FC	2015	Major League Soccer	25	5	1	0	2	0	—		—		28	5
Toronto FC	2016	Major League Soccer	24	1	6	1	0	0	—		—		30	2
Toronto FC	2017	Major League Soccer	30	0	5	0	2	0	—		—		37	0
Toronto FC	2018	Major League Soccer	32	0	—		2	0	8 (Note: Appearances in CONCACAF Champions League)	0	1 (Note: Appearance in Campeones Cup)	0	43	0
Toronto FC	2019	Major League Soccer	27	3	4	0	2	0	2	0	—		35	3
Toronto FC	2020	Major League Soccer	12 (Note: Includes three appearances in MLS is Back Tournament group stage)	0	1	0	0	0	—		1 (Note: Appearance in MLS is Back Tournament knockout stage)	0	14	0
Toronto FC	2021	Major League Soccer	32	1	—		3	0	4	0	—		39	1
Toronto FC	2022	Major League Soccer	34	3	—		4 (Note: Includes appearance in 2020 Canadian Championship final (played in 2022))	1	—		—		38	4
Toronto FC	2023	Major League Soccer	17	1	—		0	0	—		0	0	17	1
Toronto FC	Total		258	16	17	1	17	2	14	0	2	0	308	19
Career total			498	45	19	1	31	5	24	2	11	0	581	53

=== International ===
Appearances and goals by national team and year
National team	Year	Apps	Goals
United States	2006	2	0
United States	2007	12	1
United States	2008	11	2
United States	2009	15	4
United States	2010	10	1
United States	2011	13	1
United States	2012	9	2
United States	2013	10	0
United States	2014	9	1
United States	2015	18	3
United States	2016	18	0
United States	2017	14	2
United States	2018	2	0
United States	2019	8	0
Total		151	17

Scores and results list United States' goal tally first, score column indicates score after each Bradley goal.

List of international goals scored by Michael Bradley
No.	Date	Venue	Cap	Opponent	Score	Result	Competition
1	October 17, 2007	St. Jakob-Park, Basel, Switzerland	13	Switzerland	1–0	1–0	Friendly
2	June 15, 2008	Home Depot Center, Carson, United States	20	Barbados	2–0	8–0	2010 FIFA World Cup qualification
3	September 10, 2008	Toyota Park, Bridgeview, United States	24	Trinidad and Tobago	1–0	3–0	2010 FIFA World Cup qualification
4	February 11, 2009	Columbus Crew Stadium, Columbus, United States	26	Mexico	1–0	2–0	2010 FIFA World Cup qualification
5	February 11, 2009	Columbus Crew Stadium, Columbus, United States	26	Mexico	2–0	2–0	2010 FIFA World Cup qualification
6	June 21, 2009	Royal Bafokeng Stadium, Phokeng, South Africa	32	Egypt	2–0	3–0	2009 FIFA Confederations Cup
7	October 14, 2009	RFK Memorial Stadium, Washington, D.C., United States	38	Costa Rica	1–2	2–2	2010 FIFA World Cup qualification
8	June 18, 2010	Ellis Park Stadium, Johannesburg, South Africa	45	Slovenia	2–2	2–2	2010 FIFA World Cup
9	June 25, 2011	Rose Bowl, Pasadena, United States	59	Mexico	1–0	2–4	2011 CONCACAF Gold Cup
10	May 26, 2012	EverBank Field, Jacksonville, United States	65	Scotland	2–0	5–1	Friendly
11	November 14, 2012	Kuban Stadium, Krasnodar, Russia	72	Russia	1–1	2–2	Friendly
12	April 2, 2014	University of Phoenix Stadium, Glendale, United States	83	Mexico	1–0	2–2	Friendly
13	February 8, 2015	StubHub Center, Carson, United States	93	Panama	1–0	2–0	Friendly
14	July 13, 2015	Sporting Park, Kansas City, United States	102	Panama	1–1	1–1	2015 CONCACAF Gold Cup
15	July 22, 2015	Georgia Dome, Atlanta, United States	104	Jamaica	1–2	1–2	2015 CONCACAF Gold Cup
16	March 24, 2017	Avaya Stadium, San Jose, United States	129	Honduras	2–0	6–0	2018 FIFA World Cup qualification
17	June 11, 2017	Estadio Azteca, Mexico City, Mexico	133	Mexico	1–0	1–1	2018 FIFA World Cup qualification

=== Managerial ===
As of match played November 7, 2026

Managerial record by team and tenure
Team	From	To	Record					Ref.
Team	From	To	M	W	D	L	Win %	Ref.
New York Red Bulls II	June 12, 2025	December 15, 2025	19	11	4	4	57.9	
New York Red Bulls	December 15, 2025	Present	36	13	6	17	36.1	
Total			55	24	10	21	43.6	

== Honors ==
=== Player ===
Roma

- Coppa Italia runner-up: 2012–13

Toronto FC

- MLS Cup: 2017; runner-up: 2016, 2019
- Supporters' Shield: 2017
- Eastern Conference Playoffs: 2016, 2017, 2019
- Eastern Conference Regular Season: 2017
- Canadian Championship: 2016, 2017, 2018, 2020; runner-up: 2019, 2021, 2022
- CONCACAF Champions League runner-up: 2018
- Campeones Cup runner-up: 2018

United States

- FIFA Confederations Cup runner-up: 2009
- CONCACAF Gold Cup: 2007, 2017; runner-up: 2011, 2019

Individual

- MLS SuperDraft: 2004
- CONCACAF Men's Best XI: 2015, 2018
- IFFHS CONCACAF Team of the Decade: 2011–2020
- U.S. Soccer Player of the Year: 2015
- CONCACAF Gold Cup Golden Ball: 2017
- CONCACAF Gold Cup Best XI: 2017, 2019
- MLS All-Star: 2014, 2015, 2017
- Fútbol de Primera Player of the Year: 2015
- Red Patch Boys Player of the Year: 2014

=== Manager ===
New York Red Bulls II

- MLS Next Pro Cup: 2025
- MLS Next Pro Eastern Conference (Playoffs): 2025
- MLS Next Pro Eastern Conference (Regular Season): 2025
- MLS Next Pro Northeast Division: 2025

== See also ==
- List of men's footballers with 100 or more international caps
