= Clark's Town, Jamaica =

Settlement in Jamaica

Coordinates: 18.409°N 77.542°W

Location of Clark's Town in Jamaica

Clark's Town is a settlement in Jamaica; the population of the settlement is 3,139 people
