= Je-Vaughn Watson =

Jamaican footballer (born 1983)

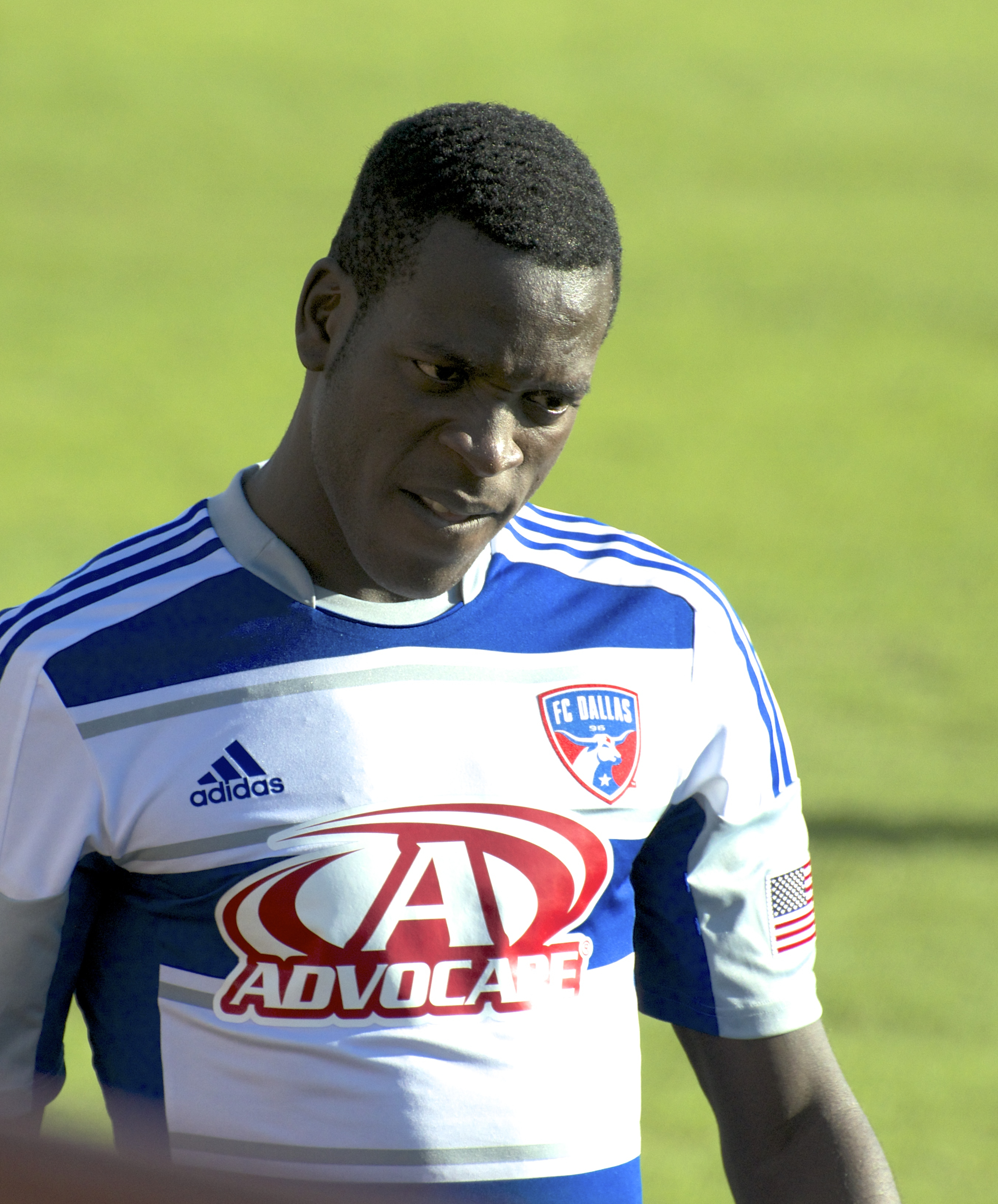
- Watson with FC Dallas in 2012

Personal information
- Full name: Je-Vaughn Tidley Watson
- Date of birth: 22 October 1983 (age 43)
- Place of birth: Saint Catherine Parish, Jamaica
- Height: 6 ft 1 in (1.85 m)
- Positions: Defender; midfielder

Senior career*
| Years | Team | Apps | (Gls) |
| 2005–2011 | Sporting Central Academy | | |
| 2011–2012 | Houston Dynamo | 41 | (1) |
| 2013–2015 | FC Dallas | 78 | (6) |
| 2016–2017 | New England Revolution | 41 | (1) |
| 2018 | Charlotte Independence | 21 | (1) |
| 2019 | Oklahoma City Energy | 16 | (0) |
| 2020 | Austin Bold | 5 | (0) |
| 2021 | Humble Lions | 3 | (0) |

International career
| 2008–2022 | Jamaica | 95 | (4) |
Medal record
Men's football
Representing Jamaica
CONCACAF Gold Cup
| Runner-up | 2015 United States–Canada | Team |
| Runner-up | 2017 United States | Team |
- * Club domestic league appearances and goals

Je-Vaughn Tidley Watson (born 22 October 1983) is a retired Jamaican footballer.

== Club career ==
=== Sporting Central Academy ===
Watson attended Garvey Maceo High School and turned professional in 2005. He spent six years playing with Sporting Central Academy in the Jamaica National Premier League, eventually becoming the club's captain.

=== Houston Dynamo ===
Watson had trials in England and Denmark, but after training with the club during the 2011 pre-season, Watson signed with Houston Dynamo of Major League Soccer on 15 April; he made his Dynamo debut on 23 April 2011 in a 1–1 tie with Chicago Fire. He became the first Sporting Central player to secure a professional contract overseas. Watson appeared for Houston in the 2011 MLS Cup and CONCACAF Champions League competitions.

=== FC Dallas ===
Watson was traded to FC Dallas on 19 February 2013 in exchange for a second-round 2015 MLS SuperDraft pick. His contract was terminated on 18 February 2016. On 4 March 2016, it was announced that Watson had resigned with Dallas and then been traded to New England Revolution for a third-round pick in the 2017 MLS SuperDraft.

=== New England Revolution ===
Watson played two seasons with the Revolution. His option was declined at the end of the 2017 season.

=== OKC Energy FC ===
In 2019, Watson signed for OKC Energy FC.

=== Austin Bold FC ===
In September 2020, Watson signed with USL Championship side Austin Bold.

=== Humble Lions ===
In August 2021, Watson returned to Jamaica to play for JPL side, Humble Lions.

== International career ==
Watson made his international debut for the Jamaica national team on 26 July 2008 in a friendly against El Salvador and has since gone on to make 13 appearances for the Reggae Boyz. He played in Jamaica's 2010 FIFA World Cup qualifier against Honduras.

== Career statistics ==
Scores and results list Jamaica's goal tally first.

| No | Date | Venue | Opponent | Score | Result | Competition |
|---|---|---|---|---|---|---|
| 1. | 24 February 2012 | Montego Bay Sports Complex, Montego Bay, Jamaica | Cuba | 2–0 | 3–0 | Friendly |
| 2. | 25 March 2016 | Independence Park, Kingston, Jamaica | Costa Rica | 1–0 | 1–1 | 2018 FIFA World Cup qualification |
| 3. | 11 October 2016 | Leonora Stadium, Leonora, Guyana | Guyana | 1–2 | 4–2 | 2017 Caribbean Cup qualification |
| 4. | 26 July 2017 | Levi's Stadium, Santa Clara, United States | United States | 1–1 | 1–2 | 2017 CONCACAF Gold Cup |

== Honours ==
Jamaica

- CONCACAF Gold Cup runner-up: 2015, 2017

Houston Dynamo

- Major League Soccer Eastern Conference Championship: 2011, 2012
