= 2017 Caribbean Cup squads =

The 2017 Caribbean Cup took place between 22 and 25 June.

Two nations were not members of FIFA.

== Martinique ==
Head coach:

| No. | Pos. | Player | Date of birth (age) | Caps | Goals | Club |
|---|---|---|---|---|---|---|
| | GK | Kévin Olimpa | March 10, 1988 (aged 29) | 13 | 0 | Unattached |
| | GK | Loïc Chauvet | April 30, 1988 (aged 29) | 9 | 0 | (Ligue de football de la Martinique) Case-Pilote |
| | DF | Nicolas Zaïre | December 8, 1986 (aged 30) | 39 | 2 | (Ligue de football de la Martinique) Club Franciscain |
| | DF | Antoine Jean-Baptiste | January 20, 1991 (aged 26) | 11 | 1 | (French Football Federation) Villefranche |
| | DF | Sébastien Crétinoir | February 12, 1986 (aged 31) | 46 | 2 | (Ligue de football de la Martinique) Golden Lion |
| | DF | Florian Narcissot | May 20, 1991 (aged 26) | 1 | 0 | (Ligue de football de la Martinique) Club Franciscain |
| | DF | Karl Vitulin | January 15, 1991 (aged 26) | 34 | 2 | (Ligue de football de la Martinique) Samaritaine |
| | DF | Jean-Sylvain Babin | October 14, 1986 (aged 30) | 8 | 1 | (Royal Spanish Football Federation) Sporting Gijón |
| | DF | Jordy Delem | March 18, 1993 (aged 24) | 32 | 5 | (United States Soccer Federation) Seattle Sounders FC |
| | DF | Kamil Louis-Jean | | 0 | 0 | (Ligue guadeloupéenne de football) USR |
| | DF | Gérald Dondon | October 14, 1986 (aged 30) | 15 | 2 | (Ligue de football de la Martinique) Club Colonial |
| | MF | Jean-Emmanuel Nédra | March 11, 1993 (aged 24) | 15 | 0 | (Ligue de football de la Martinique) Aiglon |
| | MF | Dominique Pandor | May 15, 1993 (aged 24) | 1 | 0 | (French Football Federation) Bastia |
| | MF | Daniel Hérelle | October 17, 1988 (aged 28) | 60 | 2 | (Ligue de football de la Martinique) Golden Lion |
| | MF | Christophe Jougon | July 10, 1995 (aged 21) | 11 | 0 | (Ligue de football de la Martinique) Club Franciscain |
| | MF | Stéphane Abaul | November 23, 1991 (aged 25) | 37 | 7 | (Ligue de football de la Martinique) Club Franciscain |
| | FW | Anthony Angély | March 21, 1990 (aged 27) | 18 | 2 | (French Football Federation) Poitiers |
| | FW | Steeven Langil | March 4, 1988 (aged 29) | 6 | 4 | (Polish Football Association) Legia Warsaw |
| | FW | Johan Audel | December 12, 1983 (aged 33) | 2 | 1 | Unattached |
| | FW | Yoann Arquin | April 15, 1988 (aged 29) | 13 | 3 | Unattached |
| | FW | Johnny Marajo | October 21, 1993 (aged 23) | 5 | 0 | (Ligue de football de la Martinique) Club Franciscain |
| | FW | Kévin Parsemain | February 3, 1988 (aged 29) | 41 | 27 | (Ligue de football de la Martinique) Golden Lion |
| | FW | Grégory Pastel | September 18, 1990 (aged 26) | 12 | 3 | (Ligue de football de la Martinique) Rivière-Pilote |

== Jamaica ==
Head coach: (Jamaica) Theodore Whitmore

| No. | Pos. | Player | Date of birth (age) | Club |
|---|---|---|---|---|
| | GK | Dwayne Miller | | |
| | GK | Damion Hyatt | | |
| | DF | Rosario Harriott | | |
| | DF | Damion Lowe | | |
| | DF | Ladale Ritchie | | |
| | DF | Oniel Fisher | | |
| | DF | Sergio Campbell | | |
| | DF | Jamie Richardson | | |
| | MF | Ewan Grandison | | |
| | FW | Cory Burke | 28 December 1991 (aged 25) | (United States Soccer Federation) Bethlehem Steel FC |
| | MF | Michael Binns | 12 August 1988 (aged 28) | (Jamaica Football Federation) Portmore United |
| | DF | Shaun Francis | 2 October 1986 (aged 30) | (United States Soccer Federation) San Jose Earthquakes |
| | FW | Jermaine Johnson | 25 June 1980 (aged 36) | (Jamaica Football Federation) Tivoli Gardens |
| | MF | Kevon Lambert | | |
| | FW | Shamar Nicholson | | |
| | MF | Ricardo Morris | | |
| | DF | Javain Brown | | |
| | MF | Shaun Genus | | |
| | FW | Junior Flemmings | | |
| | FW | Owayne Gordon | | |

== Curaçao ==
Head coach: (Netherlands) (Curaçao) Remko Bicentini

| No. | Pos. | Player | Date of birth (age) | Club |
|---|---|---|---|---|
| 1 | GK | Eloy Room | February 6, 1989 (aged 28) | (Royal Dutch Football Association) Vitesse |
| 2 | DF | Dustley Mulder | January 27, 1985 (aged 32) | Unattached |
| 3 | DF | Cuco Martina | September 25, 1989 (aged 27) | (The Football Association) Southampton |
| 4 | DF | Darryl Lachman | November 11, 1989 (aged 27) | (Royal Dutch Football Association) Willem II |
| 5 | DF | Quentin Jakoba | December 19, 1987 (aged 29) | (Royal Dutch Football Association) Kozakken Boys |
| 6 | MF | Jeremy de Nooijer | March 15, 1992 (aged 25) | (Bulgarian Football Union) Levski Sofia |
| 7 | MF | Leandro Bacuna | August 21, 1991 (aged 25) | (The Football Association) Aston Villa |
| 8 | MF | Jarchinio Antonia | December 27, 1990 (aged 26) | (Royal Dutch Football Association) Go Ahead Eagles |
| 9 | FW | Gino van Kessel | March 9, 1993 (aged 24) | (Polish Football Association) Lechia Gdańsk |
| 10 | MF | Kemy Agustien | August 20, 1986 (aged 30) | (Philippine Football Federation) Global Cebu |
| 11 | MF | Gevaro Nepomuceno | November 10, 1992 (aged 24) | (Portuguese Football Federation) F.C. Famalicão |
| 12 | DF | Shanon Carmelia | March 20, 1989 (aged 28) | (Royal Dutch Football Association) IJsselmeervogels |
| 13 | DF | Jurien Gaari | December 23, 1993 (aged 23) | (Royal Dutch Football Association) Kozakken Boys |
| 14 | MF | Ashar Bernardus | December 21, 1985 (aged 31) | (Curaçao Football Federation) RKSV Centro Dominguito |
| 15 | DF | Doriano Kortstam | July 7, 1994 (aged 22) | (Royal Dutch Football Association) Achilles '29 |
| 16 | MF | Michaël Maria | January 31, 1995 (aged 22) | (German Football Association) Sonnenhof Großaspach |
| 17 | DF | Gillian Justiana | March 5, 1991 (aged 26) | (Royal Dutch Football Association) Helmond Sport |
| 18 | MF | Elson Hooi | October 1, 1991 (aged 25) | (Danish Football Association) Vendsyssel FF |
| 19 | FW | Rangelo Janga | April 16, 1992 (aged 25) | (Slovak Football Association) AS Trenčín |
| 20 | FW | Felitciano Zschusschen | January 24, 1992 (aged 25) | (German Football Association) 1. FC Saarbrücken |
| 21 | DF | Ayrton Statie | July 22, 1994 (aged 22) | (Royal Dutch Football Association) FC Oss |
| 22 | GK | Pieter Jairzinho | November 11, 1987 (aged 29) | (Curaçao Football Federation) RKSV Centro Dominguito |
| 23 | GK | Rowendy Sumter | March 19, 1988 (aged 29) | (Curaçao Football Federation) RKSV Scherpenheuvel |

== French Guiana ==
Head coach:

| No. | Pos. | Player | Date of birth (age) | Caps | Goals | Club |
|---|---|---|---|---|---|---|
| | GK | Donovan Léon | November 3, 1992 (aged 24) | 10 | 0 | (French Football Federation) Brest |
| | GK | Simon Lugier | August 2, 1989 (aged 27) | 0 | 0 | (French Football Federation) Saint-Malo |
| | GK | Jean-Banuel Petit-Homme | | | | (Ligue de football de la Guyane) Matoury |
| | DF | Kévin Rimane | February 23, 1991 (aged 26) | 14 | 1 | (French Football Federation) Paris Saint-Germain B |
| | DF | Hugues Rosime | September 5, 1984 (aged 32) | 0 | 0 | (Ligue de football de la Guyane) Matoury |
| | DF | Grégory Lescot | May 10, 1989 (aged 28) | 10 | 0 | (French Football Federation) Chartres |
| | DF | Jean-David Legrand | February 23, 1991 (aged 26) | 12 | 1 | (French Football Federation) Stade Bordelais |
| | DF | Inrick Baal | February 10, 1992 (aged 25) | 3 | 0 | (Ligue de football de la Guyane) Cayenne |
| | DF | Marvin Torvic | January 5, 1988 (aged 29) | 26 | 1 | (Italian Football Federation) Campobasso |
| | MF | Loïc Baal | January 28, 1992 (aged 25) | 8 | 0 | (French Football Federation) Belfort |
| | MF | Cédric Fabien | January 31, 1982 (aged 35) | 2 | 0 | (French Football Federation) Tarbes |
| | MF | Serge Lesperance | March 9, 1982 (aged 35) | 30 | 1 | (Ligue de football de la Guyane) Matoury |
| | MF | Marc Edwige | September 26, 1986 (aged 30) | 18 | 1 | (Ligue de football de la Guyane) Cayenne |
| | MF | Miguel Haabo | September 1, 1990 (aged 26) | 9 | 1 | (Ligue de football de la Guyane) Black Stars |
| | FW | Thomas Issorat | September 3, 1993 (aged 23) | | | (Royal Belgian Football Association) Acren |
| | FW | Roy Contout | February 11, 1985 (aged 32) | 12 | 2 | (Royal Moroccan Football Federation) Renaissance Berkane |
| | FW | Arnold Abelinti | September 9, 1991 (aged 25) | 3 | 2 | (French Football Federation) Drancy |
| | FW | Shaquille Dutard | September 21, 1996 (aged 20) | | | (French Football Federation) Guingamp B |
| | FW | Alex Éric | September 21, 1990 (aged 26) | 4 | 0 | (Ligue de football de la Guyane) Matoury |
| | FW | Rhudy Evens | February 13, 1988 (aged 29) | 38 | 5 | (Ligue de football de la Guyane) Le Geldar |
| | FW | Mickaël Solvi | January 11, 1987 (aged 30) | 13 | 3 | (Ligue de football de la Guyane) Montjoly |
| | FW | Jules Haabo | | 1 | 0 | (Ligue de football de la Guyane) Étoile Matoury |
