= 2017 CONCACAF Gold Cup Group A =

Group A of the 2017 CONCACAF Gold Cup consisted of Honduras, Costa Rica, French Guiana, and Canada. 2017 CONCACAF Gold Cup matches began on July 7 and ended on July 14, 2017.

== Teams ==
Draw position	Team	Zone	Method of qualification	Date of qualification	Finals appearance	Last appearance	Previous best performance	FIFA Rankings at start of event
A1	Honduras	UNCAF	2017 Copa Centroamericana 1st place	January 17, 2017	13th	2015	Runners-up (1991)	72
A2	Costa Rica	UNCAF	2017 Copa Centroamericana 4th place	January 20, 2017	13th	2015	Runners-up (2002)	26
A3	French Guiana	CFU	2017 Caribbean Cup 3rd place	November 9, 2016	1st	—	Debut	N/A
A4	Canada	NAFU	Automatic	N/A	13th	2015	Winners (2000)	100

== Standings ==
Pos	Team	Pld	W	D	L	GF	GA	GD	Pts	Qualification
1	Costa Rica	3	2	1	0	5	1	+4	7	Advance to knockout stage
2	Canada	3	1	2	0	5	3	+2	5	Advance to knockout stage
3	Honduras	3	1	1	1	3	1	+2	4	Advance to knockout stage
4	French Guiana	3	0	0	3	2	10	−8	0	

Source: CONCACAF
Rules for classification: Group stage tiebreakers

In the quarter-finals:

- The winners of Group A, Costa Rica, advanced to play the runners-up of Group B, Panama.
- The runners-up of Group A, Canada, advanced to play the runners-up of Group C, Jamaica.
- The third-placed team of Group A, Honduras, advanced as one of the two best third-placed teams to play the winners of Group C, Mexico.

== Matches ==
=== French Guiana vs Canada ===
July 7, 2017
19:00

French Guiana	2–4	Canada
Contout 69'; Privat 71'	Report	Jakovic 28'; Arfield 45+1'; Davies 60', 86'

Red Bull Arena, Harrison
Attendance: 25,817
Referee: John Pitti (Panama)

French Guiana	Canada

GK	22	Donovan Léon (c)
RB	7	Anthony Soubervie
CB	6	Kévin Rimane	(yellow card) 19'
CB	8	Jean-David Legrand
LB	14	Grégory Lescot
RM	5	Cédric Fabien
CM	10	Loïc Baal
CM	11	Roy Contout	(yellow card) 76'
LM	4	Rhudy Evens		(substituted off) 90+2'
CF	18	Sloan Privat	(yellow card) 32'
CF	21	Shaquille Dutard		(substituted off) 64'
Substitutions:
FW	9	Arnold Abelinti		(substituted on) 64'
MF	13	Miguel Haabo		(substituted on) 90+2'
Manager:
(France) Marie-Rose Carême; Jaïr Karam

GK	18	Milan Borjan		(substituted off) 64'
RB	23	Michael Petrasso
CB	5	Dejan Jakovic
CB	19	Steven Vitória	(yellow card) 40'
LB	17	Marcel de Jong
CM	20	Patrice Bernier (c)		(substituted off) 66'
CM	6	Samuel Piette
CM	8	Scott Arfield	(yellow card) 84'
RW	10	Junior Hoilett
CF	9	Lucas Cavallini		(substituted off) 83'
LW	12	Alphonso Davies
Substitutions:
GK	1	Maxime Crépeau		(substituted on) 64'
MF	7	Russell Teibert		(substituted on) 66'
FW	16	Anthony Jackson-Hamel		(substituted on) 83'
Manager:
(Ecuador) Octavio Zambrano

Man of the Match:
Alphonso Davies (Canada)

Assistant referees:
Gabriel Victoria (Panama)
Ronald Bruna (Panama)
Fourth official:
José Kellys (Panama)

=== Honduras vs Costa Rica ===
July 7, 2017
21:00

Honduras	0–1	Costa Rica
	Report	Ureña 39'

Red Bull Arena, Harrison
Attendance: 25,817
Referee: Walter López (Guatemala)

Honduras	Costa Rica

GK	1	Luis López
CB	4	Henry Figueroa
CB	5	Ever Alvarado	(yellow card) 53'
CB	3	Maynor Figueroa (c)
RWB	2	Félix Crisanto
LWB	23	Carlos Sánchez		(substituted off) 62'
RW	6	Bryan Acosta
AM	8	Alfredo Mejía
LW	7	Carlos Discua		(substituted off) 56'
CF	16	Carlos Lanza		(substituted off) 46'
CF	12	Romell Quioto
Substitutions:
FW	17	Alberth Elis		(substituted on) 46'
MF	14	Boniek García		(substituted on) 56'
MF	10	Alexander López		(substituted on) 62'
Manager:
(Colombia) Jorge Luis Pinto

GK	18	Patrick Pemberton	(yellow card) 90+3'
CB	3	Giancarlo González	(yellow card) 29'
CB	2	Jhonny Acosta
CB	5	Kenner Gutiérrez
RWB	16	Cristian Gamboa	(yellow card) 45'
LWB	15	Francisco Calvo
RM	13	Rodney Wallace		(substituted off) 71'
CM	11	Johan Venegas		(substituted off) 35'
CM	20	David Guzmán	(yellow card) 85'
LM	10	Bryan Ruiz (c)
CF	21	Marco Ureña		(substituted off) 82'
Substitutions:
FW	12	Joel Campbell		(substituted on) 35'
MF	17	Yeltsin Tejeda		(substituted on) 71'
FW	7	David Ramírez		(substituted on) 82'
Manager:
Óscar Ramírez

Man of the Match:
Marco Ureña (Costa Rica)

Assistant referees:
Gerson López (Guatemala)
Hermenerito Leal (Guatemala)
Fourth official:
Joel Aguilar (El Salvador)

=== Costa Rica vs Canada ===
July 11, 2017
19:30
18:30 CDT (UTC−5)

Costa Rica	1–1	Canada
Calvo 42'	Report	Davies 26'

BBVA Compass Stadium, Houston
Attendance: 12,019
Referee: Mark Geiger (United States)

Costa Rica	Canada

GK	18	Patrick Pemberton
CB	3	Giancarlo González
CB	2	Jhonny Acosta
CB	5	Kenner Gutiérrez	(yellow card) 35'
RWB	16	Cristian Gamboa		(substituted off) 73'
LWB	15	Francisco Calvo
RM	12	Joel Campbell		(substituted off) 24'
CM	10	Bryan Ruiz (c)
CM	20	David Guzmán		(substituted off) 61'
LM	13	Rodney Wallace
CF	21	Marco Ureña
Substitutions:
FW	7	David Ramírez		(substituted on) 24'
MF	17	Yeltsin Tejeda		(substituted on) 61'
DF	6	José Salvatierra		(substituted on) 73'
Manager:
Óscar Ramírez

GK	18	Milan Borjan
RB	23	Michael Petrasso
CB	5	Dejan Jakovic (c)
CB	19	Steven Vitória
LB	4	Sam Adekugbe
CM	8	Scott Arfield
CM	6	Samuel Piette
CM	14	Mark-Anthony Kaye
RW	10	Junior Hoilett	(substituted off) 77'
CF	16	Anthony Jackson-Hamel	(substituted off) 56'
LW	12	Alphonso Davies	(substituted off) 69'
Substitutions:
FW	11	Tosaint Ricketts	(substituted on) 56'
DF	2	Fraser Aird	(substituted on) 69'
FW	9	Lucas Cavallini	(substituted on) 77'
Manager:
(Ecuador) Octavio Zambrano

Man of the Match:
Francisco Calvo (Costa Rica)

Assistant referees:
Charles Morgante (United States)
Corey Rockwell (United States)
Fourth official:
César Ramos (Mexico)

=== Honduras vs French Guiana ===
July 11, 2017
22:00
21:00 CDT (UTC−5)

Honduras	3–0 Awarded (Note: CONCACAF awarded Honduras a 3–0 win as a result of French Guiana fielding the ineligible player Florent Malouda, after the match had finished 0–0. Malouda had previously represented France and did not meet eligibility rules.)	French Guiana
	Report

BBVA Compass Stadium, Houston
Attendance: 12,019
Referee: Yadel Martínez (Cuba)

Honduras	French Guiana

GK	1	Luis López
RB	21	Brayan Beckeles
CB	4	Henry Figueroa
CB	3	Maynor Figueroa (c)
LB	5	Ever Alvarado	(yellow card) 68'
RM	17	Alberth Elis
CM	6	Bryan Acosta		(substituted off) 66'
CM	8	Alfredo Mejía
LM	10	Alexander López		(substituted off) 57'
CF	16	Carlos Lanza		(substituted off) 46'
CF	12	Romell Quioto	(yellow card) 76'
Substitutions:
MF	14	Boniek García		(substituted on) 46'
MF	7	Carlos Discua		(substituted on) 57'
MF	13	Sergio Peña		(substituted on) 66'
Manager:
(Colombia) Jorge Luis Pinto

GK	22	Donovan Léon
RB	5	Cédric Fabien
CB	6	Kévin Rimane	(yellow card) 40'
CB	8	Jean-David Legrand
LB	7	Anthony Soubervie		(substituted off) 82'
CM	14	Grégory Lescot	(yellow card) 80'
CM	10	Loïc Baal
CM	15	Florent Malouda (c)
RW	23	Ludovic Baal
CF	18	Sloan Privat		(substituted off) 89'
LW	9	Arnold Abelinti		(substituted off) 58'
Substitutions:
FW	4	Rhudy Evens		(substituted on) 58'
FW	11	Roy Contout		(substituted on) 82'
FW	21	Shaquille Dutard		(substituted on) 89'
Manager:
(France) Marie-Rose Carême; Jaïr Karam

Man of the Match:
Luis López (Honduras)

Assistant referees:
Hermenerito Leal (Guatemala)
Daniel Williamson (Panama)
Fourth official:
Michel Rodríguez Rogue (Cuba)

=== Costa Rica vs French Guiana ===
July 14, 2017
19:30
18:30 CDT (UTC−5)

Costa Rica	3–0	French Guiana
Rodríguez 4'; Wallace 79'; Ramírez 83'	Report

Toyota Stadium, Frisco
Attendance: 10,098
Referee: César Ramos (Mexico)

Costa Rica	French Guiana

GK	23	Danny Carvajal
RB	6	José Salvatierra
CB	3	Giancarlo González
CB	4	Michael Umaña
LB	15	Francisco Calvo
RM	19	Ulises Segura	(substituted off) 54'
CM	14	Randall Azofeifa	(substituted off) 68'
CM	17	Yeltsin Tejeda
LM	10	Bryan Ruiz (c)
CF	9	Ariel Rodríguez	(substituted off) 78'
CF	7	David Ramírez
Substitutions:
MF	20	David Guzmán	(substituted on) 54'
MF	13	Rodney Wallace	(substituted on) 68'
FW	21	Marco Ureña	(substituted on) 78'
Manager:
Óscar Ramírez

GK	22	Donovan Léon (c)
RB	7	Anthony Soubervie	(yellow card) 59'
CB	5	Cédric Fabien
CB	8	Jean-David Legrand
LB	14	Grégory Lescot
RM	23	Ludovic Baal	(red card) 61'
CM	10	Loïc Baal	(yellow card) 24'
CM	2	Hugues Rosimé
LM	4	Rhudy Evens		(substituted off) 77'
CF	11	Roy Contout		(substituted off) 66'
CF	9	Arnold Abelinti		(substituted off) 46'
Substitutions:
FW	21	Shaquille Dutard		(substituted on) 46'
MF	13	Miguel Haabo		(substituted on) 66'
FW	12	Mickaël Solvi		(substituted on) 77'
Manager:
(France) Marie-Rose Carême; Jaïr Karam

Man of the Match:
Ariel Rodríguez (Costa Rica)

Assistant referees:
Marvin Torrentera (Mexico)
Miguel Hernández (Mexico)
Fourth official:
Fernando Guerrero (Mexico)

=== Canada vs Honduras ===
July 14, 2017
22:00
21:00 CDT (UTC−5)

Canada	0–0	Honduras
	Report

Toyota Stadium, Frisco
Attendance: 10,098
Referee: Joel Aguilar (El Salvador)

Canada	Honduras

GK	18	Milan Borjan
RB	4	Sam Adekugbe
CB	19	Steven Vitória
CB	3	Manjrekar James
LB	17	Marcel de Jong
CM	8	Scott Arfield
CM	6	Samuel Piette
CM	20	Patrice Bernier (c)		(substituted off) 65'
RF	23	Michael Petrasso
CF	9	Lucas Cavallini		(substituted off) 87'
LF	10	Junior Hoilett		(substituted off) 73'
Substitutions:
MF	21	Jonathan Osorio	(yellow card) 69'	(substituted on) 65'
MF	12	Alphonso Davies		(substituted on) 73'
MF	14	Mark-Anthony Kaye		(substituted on) 87'
Manager:
(Ecuador) Octavio Zambrano

GK	1	Luis López
RB	23	Carlos Sánchez
CB	4	Henry Figueroa
CB	3	Maynor Figueroa (c)
LB	2	Félix Crisanto
RM	7	Carlos Discua	(substituted off) 65'
CM	20	Jorge Claros
CM	8	Alfredo Mejía	(substituted off) 79'
LM	12	Romell Quioto
CF	17	Alberth Elis
CF	16	Carlos Lanza
Substitutions:
MF	14	Boniek García	(substituted on) 65'
MF	13	Sergio Peña	(substituted on) 79'
Manager:
(Colombia) Jorge Luis Pinto

Man of the Match:
Marcel de Jong (Canada)

Assistant referees:
Juan Francisco Zumba (El Salvador)
William Torres (El Salvador)
Fourth official:
Daneon Parchment (Jamaica)
