= French Guiana at the CONCACAF Gold Cup =

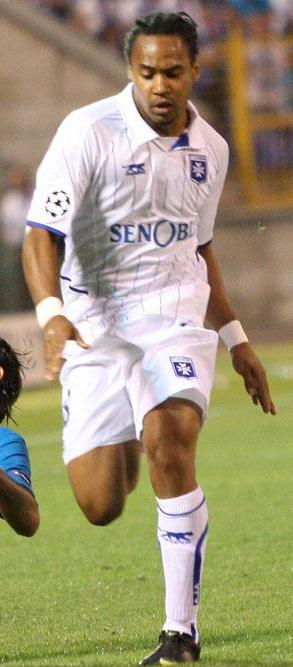
Striker Roy Contout scored French Guiana's first goal at a continental championship and played in all three matches.

The CONCACAF Gold Cup is North America's major tournament in senior men's football and determines the continental champion(s). Until 1989, the tournament was known as CONCACAF Championship. It is currently held every two years. From 1996 to 2005, nations from other confederations have regularly joined the tournament as invitees. In earlier editions, the continental championship was held in different countries, but since the inception of the Gold Cup in 1991, the United States are constant hosts or co-hosts.

From 1973 to 1989, the tournament doubled as the confederation's World Cup qualification. CONCACAF's representative team at the FIFA Confederations Cup was decided by a play-off between the winners of the last two tournament editions in 2015 via the CONCACAF Cup, but was then discontinued along with the Confederations Cup.

Since the inaugural tournament in 1963, the Gold Cup was held 28 times and has been won by seven different nations, most often by Mexico (13 titles).

French Guiana started participating in the qualification tournaments with the instatement of the Gold Cup format in 1990. Since then, they have qualified once, in 2017. They were eliminated in the group stage after three defeats.

Being a CONCACAF, but not a FIFA member, French Guiana would not be eligible to represent CONCACAF at a FIFA Confederations Cup even if they were to win the tournament.

== Overall record ==
CONCACAF Championship
Year	Result	Position	Pld	W	D	L	GF	GA
CONCACAF Gold Cup
(United States) 1991	Did not qualify							
(United States) 1993	Did not qualify							
(United States) 1996	Did not qualify							
(United States) 1998	Did not qualify							
(United States) 2000	Did not qualify							
(United States) 2002	Did not qualify							
(Mexico) (United States) 2003	Did not qualify							
(United States) 2005	Did not qualify							
(United States) 2007	Did not qualify							
(United States) 2009	Did not qualify							
(United States) 2011	Did not qualify							
(United States) 2013	Did not qualify							
(Canada) (United States) 2015	Did not qualify							
(United States) 2017	Group stage	12th	3	0	0	3	2	10
(Costa Rica) (Jamaica) (United States) 2019	Did not qualify							
(United States) 2021	Did not qualify							
(Canada) (United States) 2023	Did not qualify							
(Canada) (United States) 2025	Did not qualify							
Total	Group stage	1/18	3	0	0	3	2	10

== 2017 CONCACAF Gold Cup ==
=== Group stage ===
Pos	Team	Pld	W	D	L	GF	GA	GD	Pts	Qualification
1	Costa Rica	3	2	1	0	5	1	+4	7	Advance to knockout stage
2	Canada	3	1	2	0	5	3	+2	5	Advance to knockout stage
3	Honduras	3	1	1	1	3	1	+2	4	Advance to knockout stage
4	French Guiana	3	0	0	3	2	10	−8	0	

Source: CONCACAF
July 7, 2017
19:00

French Guiana	2–4	Canada
Contout 69'; Privat 71'	Report	Jakovic 28'; Arfield 45+1'; Davies 60', 86'

Red Bull Arena, Harrison
Attendance: 25,817
Referee: John Pitti (Panama)

July 11, 2017
22:00
21:00 CDT (UTC−5)

Honduras	3–0 Awarded (Note: CONCACAF awarded Honduras a 3–0 win as a result of French Guiana fielding the ineligible player Florent Malouda, after the match had finished 0–0. Malouda had previously represented France and did not meet eligibility rules.)	French Guiana
	Report

BBVA Compass Stadium, Houston
Attendance: 12,019
Referee: Yadel Martínez (Cuba)

July 14, 2017
19:30
18:30 CDT (UTC−5)

Costa Rica	3–0	French Guiana
Rodríguez 4'; Wallace 79'; Ramírez 83'	Report

Toyota Stadium, Frisco
Attendance: 10,098
Referee: César Ramos (Mexico)

== Florent Malouda incident ==
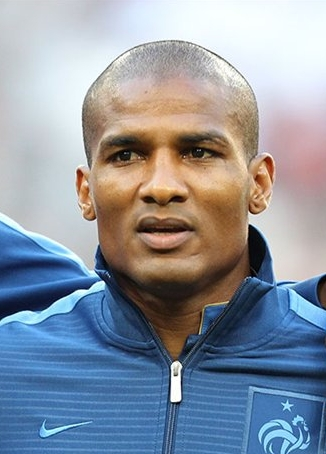
Among Florent Malouda's honours include a Champions League title, a Premier League Championship and playing in the 2006 FIFA World Cup final.

French Guiana's second group match at the 2017 Gold Cup against Honduras ended 0–0, but was later counted as a 3–0 win to Honduras. The reason was the fielding of 37-year-old veteran Florent Malouda, who played 80 international matches for France between 2004 and 2012.

Commonly, a player who has played a competitive match for one international team can no longer be fielded by a second. However, French Guiana was not a FIFA member. As such, they were able to field Malouda at the 2017 Caribbean Cup – which is not an official FIFA tournament – without repercussions.

In spite of a precedent case at the 2007 Gold Cup, when former French international Jocelyn Angloma represented Guadeloupe, Guiana was threatened to have their matches counted as forfeit if they were to field Malouda. Unsure of the legal situation, Guiana coach Jaïr Karam left Malouda benched in their first group match against Canada.

For the second match, Karam was optimistic, saying: "Now that we’re sure about our legal situation, we’ve decided to go fight, and it’s a fight we’re going to win." Malouda played as captain in the next match and led Guiana to a 0–0 against Honduras – a respectable result for the French territory. On July 14, the day of their final group match against Costa Rica, CONCACAF announced in a statement that Honduras had been awarded a 3–0 victory. In addition, French Guiana were fined an undisclosed amount and Malouda received a two-match stadium ban.
