= 2017 CONCACAF Gold Cup Group C =

Group C of the 2017 CONCACAF Gold Cup consisted of title holders Mexico, El Salvador, Curaçao, and Jamaica. Matches began on July 9 and ended on July 16, 2017.

== Teams ==
Draw position	Team	Zone	Method of qualification	Date of qualification	Finals appearance	Last appearance	Previous best performance	FIFA Rankings at start of event
C1	Mexico	NAFU	Automatic	N/A	14th	2015	Winners (1993, 1996, 1998, 2003, 2009, 2011, 2015)	16
C2	El Salvador	UNCAF	2017 Copa Centroamericana 3rd place	January 22, 2017	10th	2015	Quarter-finals (2002, 2003, 2011, 2013)	103
C3	Curaçao	CFU	2017 Caribbean Cup 1st place	October 11, 2016	1st	—	Debut	68
C4	Jamaica	CFU	2017 Caribbean Cup 2nd place	November 13, 2016	10th	2015	Runners-up (2015)	76

== Standings ==
Pos	Team	Pld	W	D	L	GF	GA	GD	Pts	Qualification
1	Mexico	3	2	1	0	5	1	+4	7	Advance to knockout stage
2	Jamaica	3	1	2	0	3	1	+2	5	Advance to knockout stage
3	El Salvador	3	1	1	1	4	4	0	4	Advance to knockout stage
4	Curaçao	3	0	0	3	0	6	−6	0	

Source: CONCACAF
Rules for classification: Group stage tiebreakers

In the quarter-finals:

- The winners of Group C, Mexico, advanced to play the third-placed team of Group A, Honduras.
- The runners-up of Group C, Jamaica, advanced to play the runners-up of Group A, Canada.
- The third-placed team of Group C, El Salvador, advanced as one of the two best third-placed teams to play the winners of Group B, the United States.

== Matches ==
=== Curaçao vs Jamaica ===
July 9, 2017
19:00
16:00 PDT (UTC−7)

Curaçao	0–2	Jamaica
	Report	Williams 58'; Mattocks 73'

Qualcomm Stadium, San Diego
Attendance: 53,133
Referee: Armando Villarreal (United States)

Curaçao	Jamaica

GK	1	Eloy Room
RB	3	Cuco Martina (c)
CB	4	Darryl Lachman
CB	5	Quentin Jakoba
LB	17	Gillian Justiana	(yellow card) 45'
CM	2	Dustley Mulder		(substituted off) 72'
CM	7	Leandro Bacuna	(yellow card) 72'
CM	11	Gevaro Nepomuceno
RW	19	Rangelo Janga
CF	8	Jarchinio Antonia		(substituted off) 66'
LW	18	Elson Hooi		(substituted off) 84'
Substitutions:
FW	9	Gino van Kessel		(substituted on) 66'
MF	16	Michaël Maria		(substituted on) 72'
FW	20	Felitciano Zschusschen		(substituted on) 84'
Manager:
(Netherlands) Remko Bicentini

GK	1	Andre Blake (c)
RB	5	Alvas Powell		(substituted off) 83'
CB	3	Damion Lowe
CB	21	Jermaine Taylor
LB	20	Kemar Lawrence	(yellow card) 67'
CM	17	Kevon Lambert
CM	15	Je-Vaughn Watson
RW	8	Oniel Fisher
AM	16	Jermaine Johnson		(substituted off) 59'
LW	18	Owayne Gordon
CF	22	Romario Williams		(substituted off) 74'
Substitutions:
FW	10	Darren Mattocks		(substituted on) 59'
MF	12	Michael Binns		(substituted on) 74'
FW	11	Cory Burke		(substituted on) 83'
Manager:
Theodore Whitmore

Man of the Match:
Andre Blake (Jamaica)

Assistant referees:
Frank Anderson (United States)
Keytzel Corrales (Nicaragua)
Fourth official:
Ismail Elfath (United States)

=== Mexico vs El Salvador ===
July 9, 2017
21:00
18:00 PDT (UTC−7)

Mexico	3–1	El Salvador
Marín 8'; E. Hernández 29'; Pineda 55'	Report	Bonilla 10'

Qualcomm Stadium, San Diego
Attendance: 53,133
Referee: Óscar Moncada (Honduras)

Mexico	El Salvador

GK	1	José de Jesús Corona
RB	14	Hedgardo Marín
CB	6	Edson Álvarez
CB	4	Hugo Ayala (c)
LB	21	Luis Reyes	(yellow card) 15'	(substituted off) 46'
CM	16	Jorge Hernández	(yellow card) 34'	(substituted off) 46'
CM	20	Jesús Dueñas	(yellow card) 87'
CM	18	Jesús Gallardo
RW	11	Elías Hernández
CF	19	Ángel Sepúlveda		(substituted off) 70'
LW	15	Rodolfo Pizarro
Substitutions:
MF	5	Jesús Molina		(substituted on) 46'
MF	7	Orbelín Pineda		(substituted on) 46'
MF	8	Érick Gutiérrez		(substituted on) 70'
Manager:
(Colombia) Luis Pompilio Páez

GK	22	Benji Villalobos		(substituted off) 76'
RB	21	Bryan Tamacas
CB	4	Henry Romero
CB	5	Iván Mancía	(yellow card) 50'
LB	13	Alexander Larín
CM	12	Narciso Orellana
CM	7	Darwin Cerén	(yellow card) 71'
RW	10	Gerson Mayen		(substituted off) 65'
AM	14	Andrés Flores (c)		(substituted off) 59'
LW	9	Nelson Bonilla
CF	11	Rodolfo Zelaya
Substitutions:
MF	8	Denis Pineda		(substituted on) 59'
MF	16	Óscar Cerén		(substituted on) 65'
GK	18	Derby Carrillo		(substituted on) 76'
Manager:
(Colombia) Eduardo Lara

Man of the Match:
Elías Hernández (Mexico)

Assistant referees:
Christian Ramírez (Honduras)
Jesús Tábora (Honduras)
Fourth official:
Héctor Said Martínez (Honduras)

=== El Salvador vs Curaçao ===
July 13, 2017
20:00
18:00 MDT (UTC−6)

El Salvador	2–0	Curaçao
Mayen 21'; Zelaya 24'	Report

Sports Authority Field, Denver
Attendance: 49,121
Referee: Héctor Rodríguez (Honduras)

El Salvador	Curaçao

GK	18	Derby Carrillo
RB	21	Bryan Tamacas
CB	4	Henry Romero
CB	5	Iván Mancía
LB	13	Alexander Larín	(yellow card) 85'
CM	12	Narciso Orellana		(substituted off) 77'
CM	7	Darwin Cerén (c)
RW	10	Gerson Mayen		(substituted off) 56'
AM	9	Nelson Bonilla
LW	8	Denis Pineda		(substituted off) 83'
CF	11	Rodolfo Zelaya
Substitutions:
MF	14	Andrés Flores		(substituted on) 56'
MF	6	Richard Menjívar		(substituted on) 77'
MF	15	Junior Burgos		(substituted on) 83'
Manager:
(Colombia) Eduardo Lara

GK	1	Eloy Room (c)
RB	13	Juriën Gaari
CB	4	Darryl Lachman
CB	5	Quentin Jakoba	(substituted off) 61'
LB	17	Gillian Justiana
CM	2	Dustley Mulder
CM	7	Leandro Bacuna
CM	11	Gevaro Nepomuceno
RW	8	Jarchinio Antonia	(substituted off) 74'
CF	18	Elson Hooi	(substituted off) 46'
LW	19	Rangelo Janga
Substitutions:
FW	9	Gino van Kessel	(substituted on) 46'
MF	16	Michaël Maria	(substituted on) 61'
MF	6	Quenten Martinus	(substituted on) 74'
Manager:
(Netherlands) Remko Bicentini

Man of the Match:
Rodolfo Zelaya (El Salvador)

Assistant referees:
Melvin Cruz (Honduras)
Gerson López (Guatemala)
Fourth official:
Bryan López (Guatemala)

=== Mexico vs Jamaica ===
July 13, 2017
22:00
20:00 MDT (UTC−6)

Mexico	0–0	Jamaica
	Report

Sports Authority Field, Denver
Attendance: 49,121
Referee: Ricardo Montero (Costa Rica)

Mexico	Jamaica

GK	23	Moisés Muñoz
RB	6	Edson Álvarez
CB	14	Hedgardo Marín
CB	4	Hugo Ayala (c)
LB	7	Orbelín Pineda
CM	15	Rodolfo Pizarro	(substituted off) 46'
CM	5	Jesús Molina
CM	20	Jesús Dueñas	(substituted off) 67'
RW	11	Elías Hernández	(substituted off) 76'
CF	9	Erick Torres
LW	18	Jesús Gallardo
Substitutions:
DF	13	César Montes	(substituted on) 46'
FW	10	Martín Barragán	(substituted on) 67'
MF	8	Érick Gutiérrez	(substituted on) 76'
Manager:
(Colombia) Luis Pompilio Páez

GK	1	Andre Blake (c)	(yellow card) 57'
RB	5	Alvas Powell
CB	3	Damion Lowe
CB	21	Jermaine Taylor
LB	20	Kemar Lawrence
RM	8	Oniel Fisher
CM	17	Kevon Lambert	(yellow card) 32'
CM	15	Je-Vaughn Watson
LM	12	Michael Binns	(yellow card) 63'	(substituted off) 75'
CF	10	Darren Mattocks		(substituted off) 90+4'
CF	11	Cory Burke		(substituted off) 88'
Substitutions:
MF	9	Ewan Grandison		(substituted on) 75'
MF	18	Owayne Gordon		(substituted on) 88'
FW	16	Jermaine Johnson		(substituted on) 90+4'
Manager:
Theodore Whitmore

Man of the Match:
Hedgardo Marín (Mexico)

Assistant referees:
Juan Carlos Mora (Costa Rica)
Gabriel Victoria (Panama)
Fourth official:
Ariel Ameth Sánchez (Panama)

=== Jamaica vs El Salvador ===
July 16, 2017
18:00
17:00 CDT (UTC−5)

Jamaica	1–1	El Salvador
Mattocks 63' (pen.)	Report	Bonilla 15'

Alamodome, San Antonio
Attendance: 44,232
Referee: Jair Marrufo (United States)

Jamaica	El Salvador

GK	1	Andre Blake (c)
RB	5	Alvas Powell
CB	3	Damion Lowe
CB	21	Jermaine Taylor
LB	20	Kemar Lawrence
RM	8	Oniel Fisher		(substituted off) 65'
CM	17	Kevon Lambert
CM	15	Je-Vaughn Watson
LM	22	Romario Williams	(yellow card) 47'
CF	10	Darren Mattocks
CF	11	Cory Burke		(substituted off) 46'
Substitutions:
MF	18	Owayne Gordon		(substituted on) 46'
MF	12	Michael Binns		(substituted on) 65'
Manager:
Theodore Whitmore

GK	18	Derby Carrillo
RB	21	Bryan Tamacas
CB	4	Henry Romero
CB	5	Iván Mancía
LB	23	Rubén Marroquín
CM	12	Narciso Orellana	(yellow card) 63'	(substituted off) 87'
CM	7	Darwin Cerén (c)
RW	10	Gerson Mayen		(substituted off) 70'
AM	9	Nelson Bonilla		(substituted off) 81'
LW	8	Denis Pineda
CF	11	Rodolfo Zelaya
Substitutions:
MF	16	Óscar Cerén		(substituted on) 70'
MF	6	Richard Menjívar		(substituted on) 81'
FW	20	Harold Alas		(substituted on) 87'
Manager:
(Colombia) Eduardo Lara

Man of the Match:
Nelson Bonilla (El Salvador)

Assistant referees:
Frank Anderson (United States)
Corey Rockwell (United States)
Fourth official:
Henry Bejarano (Costa Rica)

=== Curaçao vs Mexico ===
July 16, 2017
20:00
19:00 CDT (UTC−5)

Curaçao	0–2	Mexico
	Report	Sepúlveda 22'; Álvarez 90+1'

Alamodome, San Antonio
Attendance: 44,232
Referee: Kimbell Ward (Saint Kitts and Nevis)

Curaçao	Mexico

GK	1	Eloy Room (c)
RB	12	Shanon Carmelia
CB	4	Darryl Lachman
CB	21	Ayrton Statie	(substituted off) 90'
LB	16	Michaël Maria
CM	2	Dustley Mulder
CM	7	Leandro Bacuna
RW	6	Quenten Martinus
AM	8	Jarchinio Antonia	(substituted off) 71'
LW	11	Gevaro Nepomuceno	(substituted off) 83'
CF	9	Gino van Kessel
Substitutions:
MF	14	Ashar Bernardus	(substituted on) 71'
FW	18	Elson Hooi	(substituted on) 83'
FW	19	Rangelo Janga	(substituted on) 90'
Manager:
(Netherlands) Remko Bicentini

GK	1	José de Jesús Corona
RB	2	Luis Rodríguez	(substituted off) 57'
CB	3	Jair Pereira
CB	13	César Montes
LB	21	Luis Reyes
CM	7	Orbelín Pineda	(substituted off) 74'
CM	16	Jorge Hernández
CM	8	Érick Gutiérrez (c)
RW	17	Raúl López
CF	10	Martín Barragán	(substituted off) 66'
LW	19	Ángel Sepúlveda
Substitutions:
MF	11	Elías Hernández	(substituted on) 57'
DF	6	Edson Álvarez	(substituted on) 66'
MF	18	Jesús Gallardo	(substituted on) 74'
Manager:
(Colombia) Luis Pompilio Páez

Man of the Match:
José de Jesús Corona (Mexico)

Assistant referees:
Graeme Browne (Saint Kitts and Nevis)
Joseph Bertrand (Trinidad and Tobago)
Fourth official:
John Pitti (Panama)
