= Rosario Harriott =

Jamaican footballer (born 1989)

Personal information
- Full name: Rosario Harriott
- Date of birth: 26 September 1989 (age 37)
- Place of birth: Jamaica
- Height: 1.91 m (6 ft 3 in)
- Position: Defender

Youth career
- 2006: Tru Juice
- 2007–2008: Portmore United

Senior career*
Years	Team	Apps	(Gls)
2009–2014	Portmore United		
2014–2017	Harbour View	46	(4)
2018–2021	Portmore United		

International career^{‡}
2015–2017	Jamaica	10	(1)
Medal record
Men's football
Representing Jamaica
CONCACAF Gold Cup
Runner-up	2017 United States	Team
- * Club domestic league appearances and goals as of 24 May 2016 ‡ National team caps and goals as of 7 October 2017

Rosario Harriott (born 26 September 1989) is a Jamaican footballer who plays as a defender.

== Career ==
=== Club career ===
Harriott began his career with Tru Juice FC, where he spent a single season within the youth ranks in 2006. After two years with the Portmore United youth set-up, he joined the first-team in 2009. Scoring four times in 33 appearances during the 2011 campaign, Harriott went on to play over 20 times in his final two seasons with the club.

Portmore were crowned National Premier League champions during the 2011/12 season. Harriott joined Harbour View in 2014, and scored twice in his inaugural season.

=== International career ===
Harriott made his international debut for Jamaica in a 3–0 friendly defeat to South Korea on 13 October 2015. He was cautioned in the match before being substituted in the 71st minute.

=== International goals ===
Scores and results list Jamaica's goal tally first.

No	Date	Venue	Opponent	Score	Result	Competition
1.	26 June 2017	Stade Pierre-Aliker, Fort-de-France, Martinique	Curaçao	1–1	1–2	2017 Caribbean Cup
