= Jermaine Johnson (footballer) =

Jamaican footballer (born 1980)

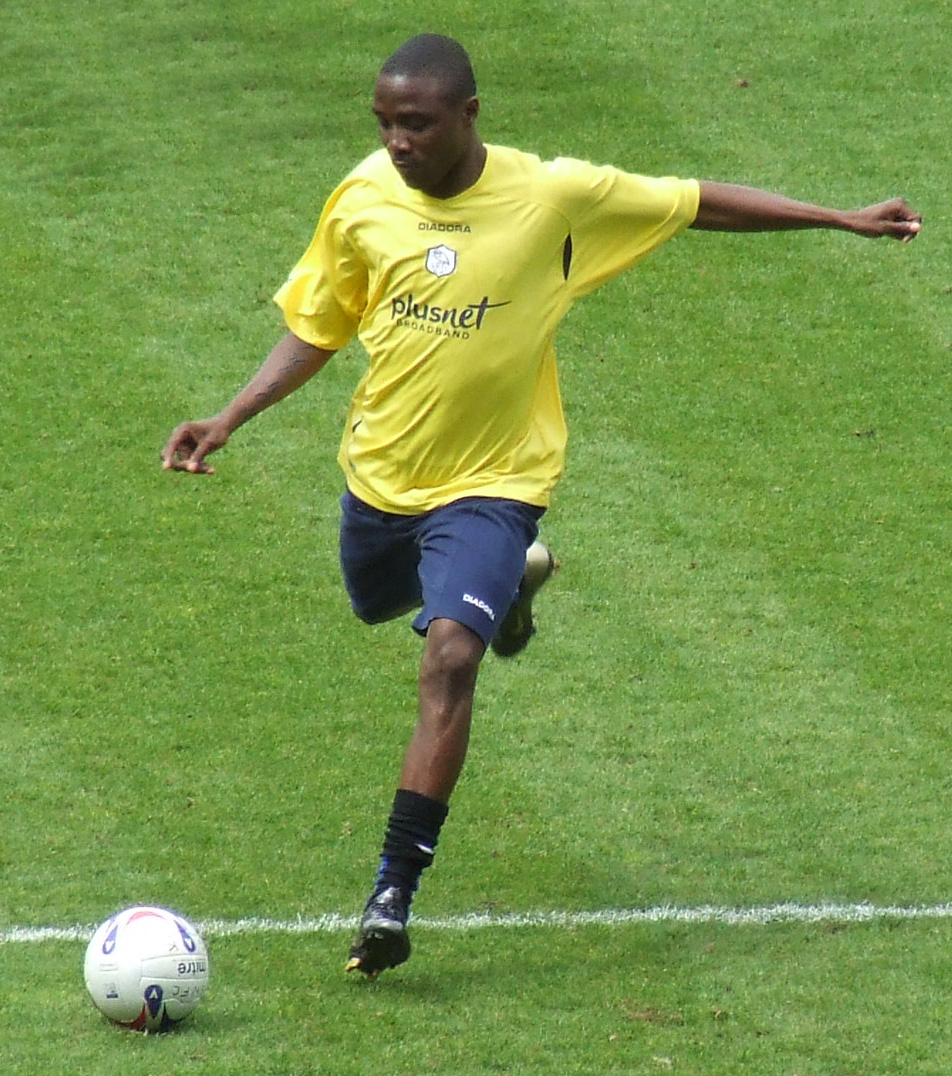
- Johnson warming up for Sheffield Wednesday

Personal information
- Date of birth: 25 June 1980 (age 46)
- Place of birth: Kingston, Jamaica
- Positions: Winger; forward

Senior career*
Years	Team	Apps	(Gls)
1999–2006	Tivoli Gardens	30	(4)
2001–2003	→ Bolton Wanderers (loan)	12	(0)
2003–2004	→ Oldham Athletic (loan)	13	(3)
2004–2006	→ Oldham Athletic (loan)	26	(6)
2006–2007	Bradford City	27	(4)
2007–2014	Sheffield Wednesday	231	(25)
2014–2015	Indy Eleven	10	(2)
Total		349	(44)

International career
2001–2017	Jamaica	77	(12)
Medal record
Men's football
Representing Jamaica
CONCACAF Gold Cup
Runner-up	2017 United States	Team
- * Club domestic league appearances and goals

Jermaine Johnson (born 25 June 1980) is a Jamaican professional footballer. Johnson initiated his football career with Tivoli Gardens in Jamaica, before moving to England where he featured for clubs such as Bolton Wanderers, Oldham Athletic, Bradford City, and Sheffield Wednesday. Over his career, Johnson has been capped 73 times for the Jamaican national team.

== Playing career ==
=== Early career ===
Johnson started his career at Tivoli Gardens before he came to England with Bolton Wanderers, making his debut during the 2001–02 season. He spent that season and the 2002–03 season at the club but started only ten games and came on as substitute in another nine but scored no goals. In August 2003, Johnson had a short loan spell with Yeovil Town but returned to Bolton without making an appearance due to an ankle injury. After his spell at the Reebok he moved to Oldham Athletic spending the next two seasons there making 34 appearances and eight as substitute scoring ten goals.

=== Bradford City ===
Johnson was signed by Bradford City manager Colin Todd on a one-year deal in June 2006 to join fellow Jamaican teammate Donovan Ricketts at Valley Parade. His debut came in the first game of the 2006–07 season at Bradford lost to Nottingham Forest. A week later, he scored his first goal for Bradford to secure a 4–2 victory over Gillingham. Todd wanted to keep hold of Johnson, but after turning down an offer of £250,000 from Derby County, the club were forced to sell Johnson to Sheffield Wednesday before the end of the January transfer window. Johnson's last game in Bradford colours was in a 2–0 defeat to Yeovil Town when he was sent off after 81 minutes. Overall, Johnson played 31 games, 27 in the league, scoring four goals for City.

=== Sheffield Wednesday ===
Sheffield Wednesday manager Brian Laws signed the Jamaican for a transfer fee in excess of £250,000 from Bradford City on 31 January 2007. Johnson had to face a three-game suspension when he arrived in Sheffield due to a red card he received in his last game for Bradford. He finally made his debut on 20 February 2007 away at Luton Town, showing glimpses of his skill, however he was substituted in the 80th minute and was unable to prevent Wednesday losing 3–2. Johnson added his first goal to his impressive performances scoring Wednesday's third goal in the 3–2 victory over Yorkshire rivals Leeds United on 3 March 2007 in the 54th minute. He was injured during his next game against Plymouth Argyle which combined with a bout of chicken pox prevented him starting for the team until the last game of the season against Norwich City. Johnson scored again to help the team win 3–2.

In December 2007, Championship rivals Queens Park Rangers made an offer for Johnson. It was turned down however as he was described as a "top asset" in the playing squad.

His first full season with the club was disrupted by injuries and suspensions; however, he was still voted midfielder of the year by fans of the club.

Johnson was involved in an unusual incident during a derby match at home to Sheffield rivals Sheffield United on 19 October 2008 when he was shown a second yellow card, and subsequently a red card, after being substituted. This occurred after he reacted angrily to his substitution by kicking a water bottle into the home supporters.

Jermaine Johnson was promoted with Sheffield Wednesday in 2012.

On 9 July 2012, he signed a one-year extension with the club. He secured Wednesday's first win of the season on 21 August with an 89th-minute goal against Birmingham City to see Wednesday win 3–2. He added his second of the season the following Tuesday against Millwall. After being out of favour for most of the season, he returned to the side against Bristol City and scored his third of the season to put Wednesday in front, and added his fourth and fifth just fourth days later on 6 April. This was his first league double for Sheffield Wednesday as he secured a crucial win against Blackburn Rovers, equalising against an early Blackburn penalty and scoring the winning goal with a great 25-yard strike in the 78th minute to give Wednesday a 3–2 win. Johnson's sixth of the 2012/13 season came against Yorkshire Rivals Leeds United, with a right-footed strike from the centre of the box, headed on from teammate Jérémy Hélan.

On 4 July 2013, he signed another one-year extension, continuing as the club's longest-serving current player. In May 2014, Johnson announced via Twitter that he was to leave Sheffield Wednesday.

=== Indy Eleven ===
Jermaine Johnson signed with North American Soccer League club Indy Eleven on 30 July 2014. He made his Indy debut from the bench against Atlanta Silverbacks on 2 Aug 2014. He was red carded in his second appearance against Fort Lauderdale Strikers four days later. The club declined to renew his contract at the end of the 2014 season.

=== International career ===
Johnson made his Jamaica national team debut in 2001.

He was again sent off four months later, this time for Jamaica in an international friendly against Nigeria at the New Den, in London. Johnson was involved in an altercation with Taye Taiwo, for which they were both shown a red card, but Johnson also appeared to push the linesman.

Johnson was recalled to the Jamaica squad in February 2013, making an appearance in their 0–0 draw with Mexico, his first appearance since November 2009, also Johnson made his appearance again as substitute against Panama in a 1–1 draw in a 2014 FIFA World Cup qualifiers match.

=== International goals ===
Scores and results list Jamaica's goal tally first.

No	Date	Venue	Opponent	Score	Result	Competition
1.	24 October 1999	Truman Bodden Sports Complex, George Town, Cayman Islands	Cayman Islands	4–1	4–1	Friendly
2.	5 July 2000	Independence Park, Kingston, Jamaica	Barbados	1–0	5–0	Friendly
3.	8 July 2000	Hasely Crawford Stadium, Port of Spain, Trinidad and Tobago	Trinidad and Tobago	3–1	4–2	Friendly
4.	11 November 2002	Grenada National Stadium, St. George's, Grenada	Guadeloupe	1–0	2–0	2003 CONCACAF Gold Cup qualification
5.	13 November 2002	Grenada National Stadium, St. George's, Grenada	Grenada	1–0	4–1	2003 CONCACAF Gold Cup qualification
6.	13 November 2002	Grenada National Stadium, St. George's, Grenada	Grenada	2–0	4–1	2003 CONCACAF Gold Cup qualification
7.	30 March 2003	Independence Park, Kingston, Jamaica	Haiti	1–0	3–0	2003 CONCACAF Gold Cup qualification
8.	25 May 2003	Independence Park, Kingston, Jamaica	Nigeria	2–0	3–2	Friendly
9.	18 February 2004	Independence Park, Kingston, Jamaica	Uruguay	2–0	2–0	Friendly
10.	7 June 2009	Independence Park, Kingston, Jamaica	Panama	1–1	3–2	Friendly
11.	13 June 2017	Estadio Monumental Virgen de Chapi, Arequipa, Peru	Peru	1–3	1–3	Friendly
12.	22 June 2017	Stade Pierre-Aliker, Fort-de-France, Martinique	French Guiana	1–1	1–1 (4–2 p)	2017 Caribbean Cup

== Honours ==
Individual

- Football League Cup top assist provider: 2007–08 Had 4 goals
