= Carême (surname) =

Carême is a French surname. Notable people with the surname include:

- Marie-Antoine Carême (1784–1833), French chef
- Maurice Carême (1899–1978), Belgian poet
- Marie-Rose Carême, French football manager
- Baptiste Carême (born 1985), French badminton player
