= Shaquille Dutard =

French Guianan footballer (born 1996)

Personal information
- Full name: Shaquille Dutard Barnwell
- Date of birth: 21 September 1996 (age 30)
- Place of birth: Cayenne, French Guiana
- Height: 1.81 m (5 ft 11 in)
- Position: Forward

Team information
- Current team: Jeunesse Esch
- Number: 78

Youth career
- –2007: US Chanteloup
- 2007–2012: Paris Saint-Germain FC
- 2012–2013: AC Boulogne-Billancourt

Senior career*
Years	Team	Apps	(Gls)
2013–2014	US Chanteloup		
2014–2015	AS Cannes B		
2015–2016	OGC Nice B	7	(1)
2016–2017	EA Guingamp B	23	(4)
2017	Tarbes Pyrénées Football	2	(0)
2017–2018	FC Borgo	9	(0)
2018–2019	Trélissac-Antonne Périgord FC	26	(7)
2019	Les Herbiers VF	13	(1)
2020	Trélissac-Antonne Périgord FC	1	(0)
2020–2021	Francs Borains	1	(0)
2022–2023	Bourges Foot 18	3	(0)
2023–2024	US Forbach		
2024–	Jeunesse Esch	17	(2)

International career^{‡}
2017–	French Guiana	7	(1)
- * Club domestic league appearances and goals as of 26 June 2025 ‡ National team caps and goals as of 2 November 2024

Shaquille Dutard Barnwell (born 21 September 1996) is a French Guianan footballer who plays as a forward for Jeunesse Esch.

== Life and career ==
Dutard was born on 21 September 1996 in Cayenne, French Guiana. He was named after American basketball player Shaquille O'Neal. He mainly operates as a forward. He is right-footed. As a youth player, he joined the youth academy of French side US Chanteloup. In 2007, he joined the youth academy of French Ligue 1 side Paris Saint-Germain FC. He was teammates with France international Kingsley Coman while playing for the club. He started his senior career with French side US Chanteloup. In 2014, he signed for French side AS Cannes B. In 2015, he signed for French side OGC Nice B. In 2016, he signed for French side EA Guingamp B. In 2017, he signed for French side Tarbes Pyrénées Football.

After that, he signed for French side FC Borgo. In 2018, he signed for French side Trélissac-Antonne Périgord FC. In 2019, he signed for French side Les Herbiers VF. In 2020, he returned to French side Trélissac-Antonne Périgord FC. After that, he signed for Belgian side Francs Borains. In 2021, he returned to French side Trélissac-Antonne Périgord FC for the second time. In 2022, he signed for French side Bourges Foot 18. In 2023, he signed for French side US Forbach. He was described as a "powerhouse who has been making US Forbach happy since the start of the season" while playing for the club. In 2024, he signed for Luxembourgish side Jeunesse Esch. He is a French Guiana international. He played for the French Guiana national football team for the 2017 CONCACAF Gold Cup.

== Career statistics ==
=== International ===
Scores and results list French Guiana'a goal tally first, score column indicates score after each Dutard goal.

List of international goals scored by Shaquille Dutard
No.	Date	Venue	Opponent	Score	Result	Competition
1	17 June 2017	Stade Municipal Dr. Edmard Lama, Remire-Montjoly, French Guiana	Barbados	1–0	3–0	Friendly
