= Steeve Falgayrettes =

French Guianan football manager

Personal information
- Place of birth: French Guiana

Managerial career
- Years: Team
- 2011–2012: French Guiana

Steeve Falgayrettes is a French Guianan professional football manager.

== Career ==
In 2011 and 2012 he coached the French Guiana national football team.
