= David Ramírez (footballer, born 1993) =

Costa Rican footballer (born 1993)

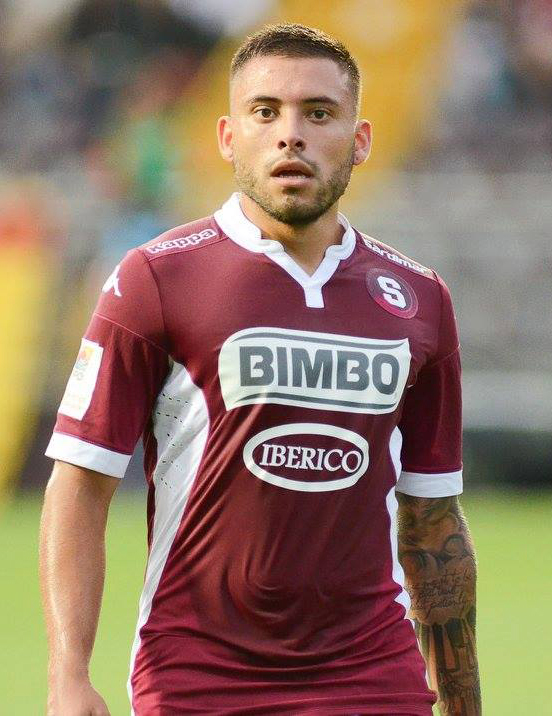
- Ramirez with Deportivo Saprissa in 2016

Personal information
- Full name: David Gerardo Ramírez Ruiz
- Date of birth: 28 May 1993 (age 33)
- Place of birth: San José, Costa Rica
- Height: 1.75 m (5 ft 9 in)
- Position: Forward

Team information
- Current team: Guadalupe
- Number: 21

Youth career
- 2010–2013: Deportivo Saprissa

Senior career*
Years	Team	Apps	(Gls)
2013–2018	Deportivo Saprissa	101	(34)
2015	→ Evian (loan)	6	(0)
2015	→ Evian B (loan)	2	(0)
2016–2017	→ Moreirense (loan)	21	(2)
2018–2020	Omonia	28	(8)
2019–2020	→ Deportivo Saprissa (loan)	10	(6)
2021	Cartaginés	14	(2)
2021	Deportivo Saprissa	20	(2)
2022–	Guadalupe	6	(0)

International career^{‡}
2010–2013	Costa Rica U20	13	(7)
2014–	Costa Rica	20	(4)
- * Club domestic league appearances and goals as of 20:08, 26 July 2023 (UTC) ‡ National team caps and goals as of October 12, 2018 (UTC)

David "El Princeso" Ramírez Ruiz (born 28 May 1993) is a Costa Rican professional footballer who plays as a forward for Guadalupe.

== Club career ==
Ramírez is a product of the Saprissa youth system and debuted in the Premier Division in the 2013/14 season. In September 2014, he was suspended for two matches by Saprissa coach Rónald González for alleged misconduct.

On 12 January 2015, Ramírez was loaned out to French club Evian on a six-month deal. On 6 July 2016, he joined Portuguese club Moreirense on a loan deal.

On 21 July 2018, Ramírez joined Cypriot First Division club AC Omonia on a three-year contract.

== International career ==
Ramírez represented Costa Rica at the 2015 CONCACAF Gold Cup, scoring one goal in three matches. He also played for the team at the 2017 CONCACAF Gold Cup.

=== International goals ===
Scores and results list Costa Rica's goal tally first.

#	Date	Venue	Opponent	Score	Result	Competition
1	10 October 2014	Sohar Regional Sports Complex, Sohar, Oman	Oman	4–1	4–3	Friendly
2	27 June 2015	Orlando Citrus Bowl Stadium, Orlando, United States	Mexico	1–0	2–2	Friendly
3	8 July 2015	StubHub Center, Carson, United States	Jamaica	2–1	2–2	2015 CONCACAF Gold Cup
4	14 July 2017	Toyota Stadium, Frisco, United States	French Guiana	3–0	3–0	2017 CONCACAF Gold Cup

== Honors ==
Saprissa

- Costa Rican Primera División: 2013–14 Verano

Moreirense

- Taça da Liga: 2016–17

Costa Rica

- Copa Centroamericana: 2014
