= François Louis-Marie =

French Guianan football manager

Personal information
- Date of birth: 13 October 1961 (age 65)
- Place of birth: French Guiana

Managerial career
- Years: Team
- 2004–2005: French Guiana
- 2012–2013: French Guiana

François Louis-Marie (born 13 October 1961) is a French Guianan professional football manager.

== Career ==
Since 2004 until 2005 and since 2012 until 2013 (together with Hubert Contout) he coached the French Guiana national football team.
