= Ghislain Zulémaro =

French Guianan football manager

Personal information
- Place of birth: French Guiana

Managerial career
- Years: Team
- 2008–2010: French Guiana

Ghislain Zulémaro is a French Guianan professional football manager.

== Career ==
Since 2008 until 2010 he coached the French Guiana national football team.
