= Jules Haabo =

French Guianan footballer (born 1997)

Personal information
- Date of birth: 12 April 1997 (age 29)
- Place of birth: Kourou, French Guiana
- Height: 1.70 m (5 ft 7 in)
- Position: Striker

Team information
- Current team: Étoile Matoury

Senior career*
Years	Team	Apps	(Gls)
2016–2019	Étoile Matoury		
2019–2020	Yverdon-Sport		
2020–2022	CSC de Cayenne		
2022–	Étoile Matoury		

International career^{‡}
2016–	French Guiana	19	(9)
- * Club domestic league appearances and goals ‡ National team caps and goals as of 30 September 2026

Jules Haabo (born 12 April 1997) is a French Guianan professional footballer who plays for the French Guiana national football team.

== Career statistics ==
=== International ===
As of matches played 30 September 2026

National team	Year	Apps	Goals
French Guiana	2016	1	0
French Guiana	2017	2	0
French Guiana	2018	3	2
French Guiana	2019	1	0
French Guiana	2023	6	3
French Guiana	2024	4	3
French Guiana	2026	2	1
Total		19	9

Scores and results list French Guiana's goal tally first, score column indicates score after each Haabo goal.

List of international goals scored by Jules Haabo
No.	Date	Venue	Opponent	Score	Result	Competition
1	20 November 2018	Stade Municipal Dr. Edmard Lama, Remire-Montjoly, French Guiana	Guyana	1–0	2–1	2019–20 CONCACAF Nations League qualification
2	20 November 2018	Stade Municipal Dr. Edmard Lama, Remire-Montjoly, French Guiana	Guyana	2–0	2–1	2019–20 CONCACAF Nations League qualification
3	25 February 2023	Stade Municipal Dr. Edmard Lama, Remire-Montjolly, French Guiana	Martinique	1–0	2–2	Friendly
4	13 October 2023	Arnos Vale Stadium, Kingstown, Saint Vincent and the Grenadines	Saint Vincent and the Grenadines	4–1	4–1	2023–24 CONCACAF Nations League B
5	16 October 2023	Stade Pierre-Aliker, Fort-de-France, Martinique	Saint Vincent and the Grenadines	3–2	3–2	2023–24 CONCACAF Nations League B
6	10 October 2024	Stade Omnisports de Sinnamary, Sinnamary, French Guiana	Honduras	2–3	2–3	2024–25 CONCACAF Nations League A
7	14 October 2024	Nicaragua National Football Stadium, Managua, Nicaragua	Nicaragua	2–1	2–3	2024–25 CONCACAF Nations League A
8	19 November 2024	Dr. Ir. Franklin Essed Stadion, Paramaribo, Suriname	Belize	2–2	2–2	2024–25 CONCACAF Nations League Play-in
