= Hubert Contout =

French Guianan football manager

Personal information
- Place of birth: French Guiana

Managerial career
- Years: Team
- 2012–2013: French Guiana

Hubert Contout is a French Guianan professional football manager.

== Career ==
Since 2012 until 2013 he coached the French Guiana national football team together with François Louis-Marie.
