= Yohan Marmot =

French Guianan association football player (born 1999)

Personal information
- Full name: Yohan Damien Marmot
- Date of birth: 22 July 1999 (age 27)
- Place of birth: Colombes, France
- Height: 1.79 m (5 ft 10 in)
- Position: Left-back

Team information
- Current team: Stockay
- Number: 97

Youth career
- Ajaccio

Senior career*
Years	Team	Apps	(Gls)
2018–2020	Ajaccio II	38	(0)
2019–2020	Ajaccio	0	(0)
2020–2022	Bastia-Borgo	47	(0)
2022–2023	Angoulême	9	(0)
2023–2024	URSL Visé	28	(1)
2024–2025	Saint-Colomban Locminé	1	(0)
2025–	Stockay	40	(2)

International career
2022–2024	French Guiana	13	(0)
- * Club domestic league appearances and goals as of 28 June 2026

Yohan Damien Marmot (born 22 July 1999) is a footballer who plays as a left-back for Stockay. Born in metropolitan France, he plays for the French Guiana national team.

== Club career ==
Marmot is a youth academy graduate of Ajaccio. He made his debut for the club on 16 November 2019 in a 3–1 Coupe de France defeat against Saint-Flour.

== International career ==
Marmot made his debut for French Guiana on 2 June 2022 in a 2–0 CONCACAF Nations League win against Guatemala.

== Career statistics ==
=== International ===
As of 10 October 2024

Appearances and goals by national team and year
National team	Year	Apps	Goals
French Guiana	2022	4	0
French Guiana	2023	5	0
French Guiana	2024	3	0
Total		12	0
