= Remko Bicentini =

Curaçaoan association football manager and former player (born 1968)

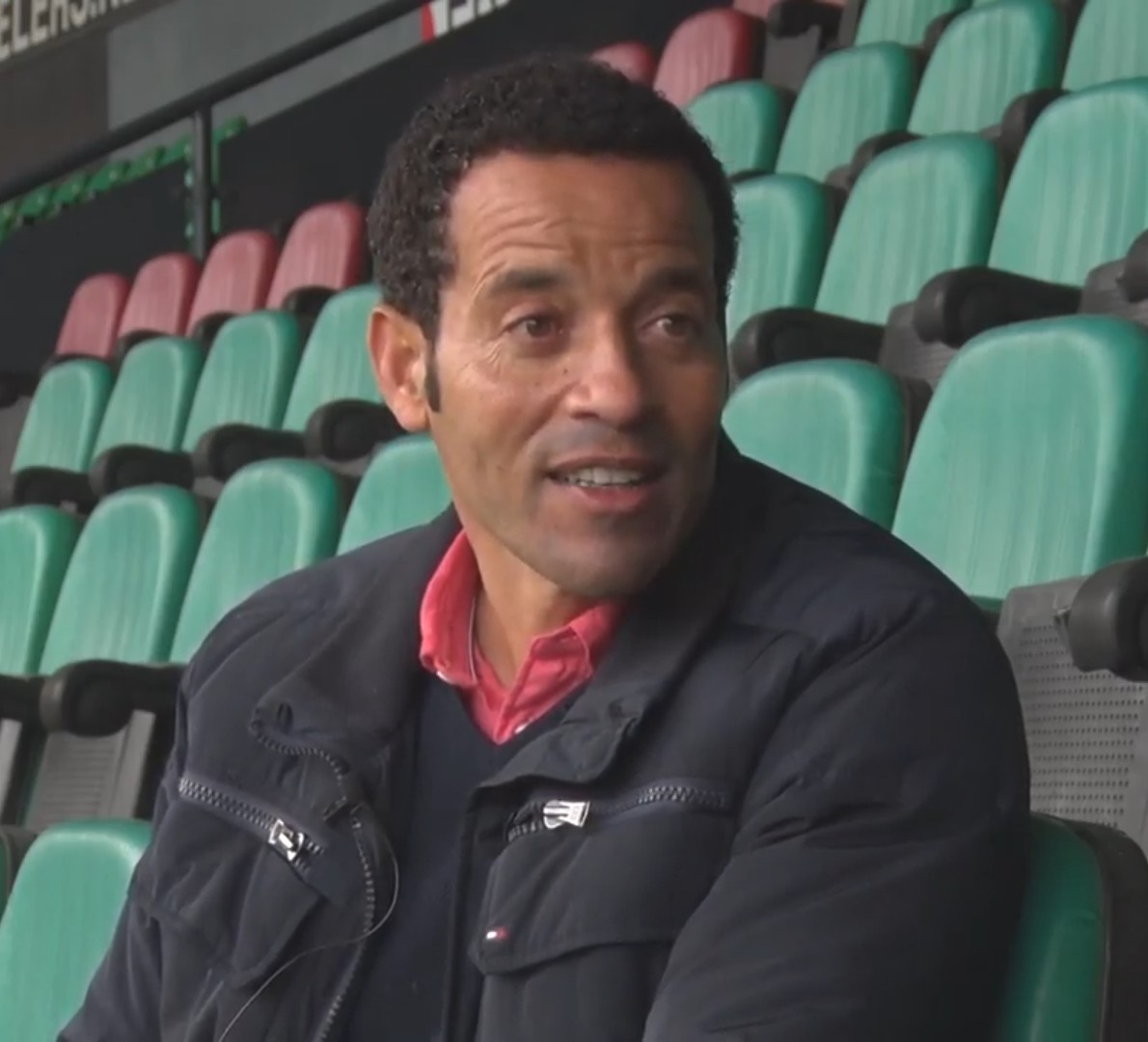
- Bicentini in 2020

Personal information
- Date of birth: 20 February 1968 (age 58)
- Place of birth: Nijmegen, Netherlands
- Position: Centre-back

Youth career
- –1980: SV Hatert
- 1980–1985: Sportclub NEC
- 1985–1986: NEC

Senior career*
Years	Team	Apps	(Gls)
1986–1987	NEC	22	(0)

Managerial career
- 2008: Netherlands Antilles (assistant)
- 2009–2010: Netherlands Antilles
- 2010–2011: Beuningse Boys
- 2011: Orion Nijmegen
- 2011–2016: Curaçao (assistant)
- 2012–2013: AWC
- 2016–2020: Curaçao
- 2021–2022: Canada (assistant)
- 2022–2023: Curaçao
Medal record
Men's football
Representing Curaçao (as manager)
Caribbean Cup
Winner	2017 Martinique
- * Club domestic league appearances and goals

Remko Bicentini (born 20 February 1968) is a Dutch-Curaçaoan football manager and former professional player.

== Playing career ==
Bicentini, who played as a central defender, began his professional career in the Netherlands with NEC, making 22 appearances in the 1986–87 and 87-88 seasons. He later played for a number of amateur teams including De Treffers, SJN, Nijmeegse Boys, VV Germania, SV AWC and DIO '30.

== Managerial career ==
In 2009, Bicentini was appointed as the head coach of the Netherlands Antilles national team.

In September 2016, Bicentini became the head coach of the Curaçao national team, replacing Patrick Kluivert. He previously served as Kluivert's assistant.

In June 2017, Bicentini coached Curaçao to their maiden Caribbean Cup (final edition) title. He also helped the island qualify for three straight CONCACAF Gold Cups. He left Curaçao in August 2020 and was replaced by Guus Hiddink.

In February 2021, Bicentini joined Canada coach John Herdman's staff as an assistant coach. In August 2022 he returned to his role as head coach of Curaçao.

== Personal life ==
His father is former NEC player Moises Bicentini. Bicentini is founder and chairman of the Dutch Caribbean Stars.

== Honours ==
Curaçao

- Caribbean Cup: 2017
