= Sloan Privat =

French Guianan professional footballer (born 1989)

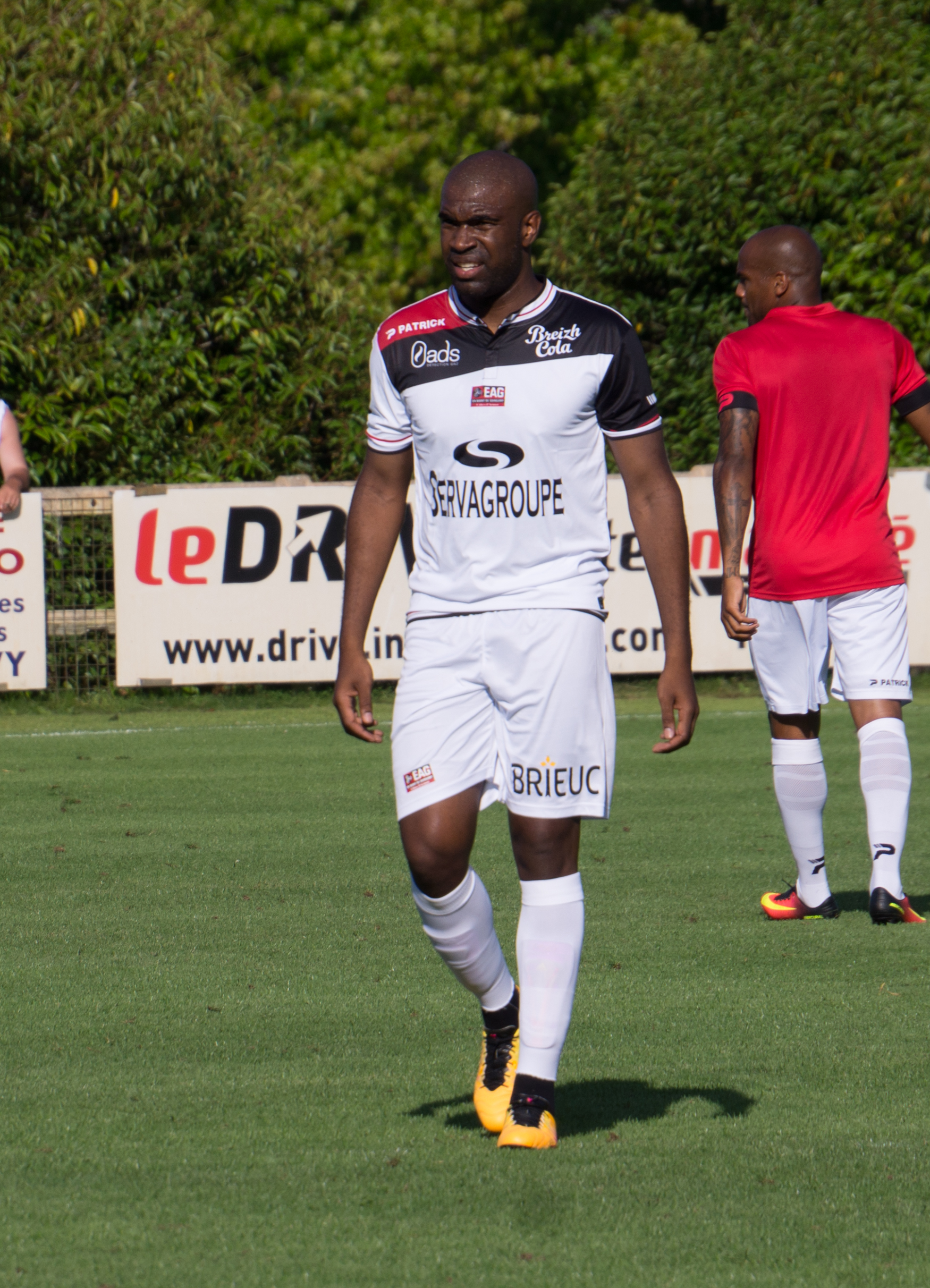
- Sloan Privat in 2016

Personal information
- Full name: Sloan Gilles Privat
- Date of birth: 24 July 1989 (age 37)
- Place of birth: Cayenne, French Guiana
- Height: 1.86 m (6 ft 1 in)
- Position: Forward

Team information
- Current team: Pont-de-Roide

Youth career
- 1999–2002: FC Marmande 47
- 2002–2007: Sochaux

Senior career*
Years	Team	Apps	(Gls)
2007–2013	Sochaux	96	(20)
2010–2011	→ Clermont (loan)	36	(20)
2013–2016	Gent	20	(2)
2014–2015	→ Caen (loan)	20	(6)
2015–2016	→ Guingamp (loan)	27	(7)
2016–2017	Guingamp	48	(10)
2018	Valenciennes	14	(3)
2019	Osmanlıspor	3	(0)
2019–2020	Sochaux	6	(0)
2021	Bourg-Péronnas	5	(0)
2023	Bassin d'Arcachon		
2024–	Pont-de-Roide		

International career
2011	France U21	1	(0)
2015–2022	French Guiana	11	(7)
- * Club domestic league appearances and goals as of 16 November 2024

Sloan Gilles Privat (born 24 July 1989) is a French Guianan professional footballer who plays as a forward for Pont-de-Roide.

== Career ==
=== Sochaux ===
Born in Cayenne, French Guiana, Privat began his career with FC Marmandais. In 2002, he attracted interest from professional club Sochaux. In 2005, the interest became concrete with the club offering him an aspirant (youth) contract. He arrived at the club's aspiring youth academy amongst a host of other youth talent. In 2007, Privat played on the Sochaux under-19 team, alongside Frédéric Duplus, Geoffrey Tulasne, and Vincent Nogueira, that won the Coupe Gambardella. On 22 September 2007, he made his professional debut in a 1–0 defeat to Bordeaux coming on as a late match substitute. The cameo appearance was his only one of the 2007–08 season.

For the 2008–09 season, Privat was given the first-team number 15 shirt. He made his first career start on 14 September 2008 against Lille. In the match, he scored his first goal for the club giving the team a 1–0 lead, however the match would end in a 1–1 draw. He signed his first professional contract on 12 December, until 2012. He extended his deal further in August 2011 for three years, to run until summer 2014.

=== Clermont Foot ===
On 4 August 2010, Privat was loaned to Ligue 2 club Clermont for the 2010–11 Ligue 2 season. His arrival paid immediate dividends with the player netting 10 league goals in the first half of the campaign. Privat finished the Ligue 2 season at Clermont season with 20 goals in 36 matches.

=== Gent ===
On 26 August 2013, Privat signed a four-year contract with Jupiler Pro League club Gent. On 6 October 2013, he scored his first league goal in Belgium against Racing Genk.

=== Caen ===
He was loaned back in France in June 2014 to Stade Malherbe Caen, for the 2014–15 season.

=== Guingamp ===
In June 2015, Privat joined En Avant de Guingamp on loan for the 2015–16 season, with an option given to Guingamp to sign him permanently. A year later, Guingamp announced the club had exercised the option.

=== Valenciennes ===
On 31 January 2018, the last day of the 2017–18 winter transfer window, Privat was released from his Guingamp contract and joined Ligue 2 side Valenciennes FC on 1 1/2-year contract until summer 2019.

=== Osmanlıspor ===
In January 2019, he joined Osmanlıspor. His contract was terminated on 31 May 2019.

=== Return to Sochaux ===
On 31 July 2019, Privat returned to Sochaux, signing a one-year contract with a club option for an additional year. He was released at the end of the 2019–20 season.

=== Bourg-Péronnas ===
After seven months without a club, Privat signed for Championnat National side Bourg-Péronnas on 4 January 2021.

== Personal life ==
His younger brother Stéphane (born 1997) is also a footballer, who plays as a striker for FC Marmande 47.

== Honors ==
French Guiana

- Caribbean Cup bronze: 2017

== Career statistics ==
=== International ===
Appearances and goals by national team and year
National team	Year	Apps	Goals
French Guiana	2015	1	2
French Guiana	2016	1	3
French Guiana	2017	3	2
French Guiana	2018	–	
French Guiana	2019	3	0
French Guiana	2020	–	
French Guiana	2021	1	0
French Guiana	2022	2	0
Total		11	7

Scores and results list French Guiana's goal tally first, score column indicates score after each Privat goal.

List of international goals scored by Sloan Privat
No.	Date	Venue	Opponent	Score	Result	Competition
1	25 March 2015	Stade Municipal Dr. Edmard Lama, Cayenne, French Guiana	Honduras	2–1	3–1	2015 CONCACAF Gold Cup qualification
2	25 March 2015	Stade Municipal Dr. Edmard Lama, Cayenne, French Guiana	Honduras	3–1	3–1	2015 CONCACAF Gold Cup qualification
3	9 November 2016	Stade Sylvio Cator, Port-au-Prince, Haiti	Haiti	1–2	5–2	2017 Caribbean Cup qualification
4	9 November 2016	Stade Sylvio Cator, Port-au-Prince, Haiti	Haiti	2–2	5–2	2017 Caribbean Cup qualification
5	9 November 2016	Stade Sylvio Cator, Port-au-Prince, Haiti	Haiti	3–2	5–2	2017 Caribbean Cup qualification
6	26 June 2017	Stade Pierre-Aliker, Fort-de-France, Martinique	Martinique	1–0	1–0	2017 Caribbean Cup
7	7 July 2017	Red Bull Arena, Harrison, United States	Canada	2–3	2–4	2017 CONCACAF Gold Cup
