= Kévin Rimane =

French Guianan footballer (born 1991)

Personal information
- Full name: Kévin Ramon Rimane
- Date of birth: 23 February 1991 (age 35)
- Place of birth: Cayenne, French Guiana, France
- Height: 1.81 m (5 ft 11 in)
- Position: Center-back

Team information
- Current team: Corte

Youth career
- –2008: Paris Saint-Germain

Senior career*
Years	Team	Apps	(Gls)
2008–2011	Paris Saint-Germain B	48	(11)
2011–2014	Boulogne	77	(2)
2013	Boulogne B	1	(0)
2014–2019	Paris Saint-Germain B	88	(1)
2016–2019	Paris Saint-Germain	3	(0)
2019	→ Istra 1961 (loan)	9	(0)
2019–2020	Hermannstadt	19	(0)
2021	Torcy		
2021–2022	Bastia-Borgo	18	(0)
2022–2023	Cholet	16	(0)
2023–2024	Borgo	19	(0)
2024–	Corte	10	(0)

International career^{‡}
2014–	French Guiana	28	(2)
- * Club domestic league appearances and goals as of 7 December 2024 ‡ National team caps and goals as of 23:36, 5 September 2023 (UTC)

Kévin Ramon Rimane (born 23 February 1991) is a French Guianan professional footballer who plays as a center-back for Championnat National 3 club Corte and the French Guiana national team.

== Club career ==
=== Early career ===
Rimane trained in the academy programs at Paris Saint-Germain, but signed his first contract, for three years, with Boulogne in the summer of 2011. He played his first professional match for Boulogne on 5 August 2011 against Angers in Ligue 2.

=== Paris Saint-Germain ===
Out of contract at Boulogne in 2014, he returned to Paris Saint-Germain B to grow with the reserve and attempt to advance. His faithfulness and his efforts were rewarded with inclusion in the first-team squad for Paris Saint-Germain against Saint-Étienne on 31 January 2016. He started and played the full 90 minutes for Paris Saint-Germain as they defeated Monaco 4–0 in the 2018 Trophée des Champions on 4 August 2018.

==== Loan to Istra 1961 ====
On 7 February 2019, he signed a loan contract to the end of 2018–19 season with Croatian club NK Istra 1961.

=== Hermannstadt ===
Rimane joined Hermannstadt in August 2019.

=== Bastia-Borgo ===
On 2 December 2021, Rimane signed with Championnat National club Bastia-Borgo.

=== Cholet ===
On 24 May 2022, Rimane joined Cholet for the 2022–23 season.

== International career ==
Rimane is an international for the French Guiana national team.

== Career statistics ==
=== Club ===
As of match played 13 May 2022

Appearances and goals by club, season and competition
Club	Season	League			Cup (Note: Includes Coupe de France and Cupa României)		Other		Total	
Club	Season	Division	Apps	Goals	Apps	Goals	Apps	Goals	Apps	Goals
Paris Saint-Germain B	2008–09	CFA	8	0	—		—		8	0
Paris Saint-Germain B	2009–10	CFA	12	0	—		—		12	0
Paris Saint-Germain B	2010–11	CFA	28	1	—		—		28	1
Paris Saint-Germain B	Total		48	1	—		—		48	1
Boulogne	2011–12	Ligue 2	28	0	0	0	1 (Note: Appearance in Coupe de la Ligue)	0	29	0
Boulogne	2012–13	National	26	0	1	0	0	0	27	0
Boulogne	2013–14	National	23	2	2	0	1	0	26	2
Boulogne	Total		77	2	3	0	2	0	82	2
Boulogne B	2012–13	CFA 2	1	0	—		—		1	0
Paris Saint-Germain B	2014–15	CFA	16	0	—		—		16	0
Paris Saint-Germain B	2015–16	CFA	21	0	—		—		21	0
Paris Saint-Germain B	2016–17	CFA	26	0	—		—		26	0
Paris Saint-Germain B	2017–18	National 2	22	1	—		—		22	1
Paris Saint-Germain B	2018–19	National 2	3	0	—		—		3	0
Paris Saint-Germain B	Total		88	1	—		—		88	1
Paris Saint-Germain	2015–16	Ligue 1	1	0	0	0	0	0	1	0
Paris Saint-Germain	2016–17	Ligue 1	0	0	0	0	0	0	0	0
Paris Saint-Germain	2017–18	Ligue 1	1	0	0	0	0	0	1	0
Paris Saint-Germain	2018–19	Ligue 1	1	0	1	0	1 (Note: Appearance in Trophée des Champions)	0	3	0
Paris Saint-Germain	Total		3	0	1	0	1	0	5	0
Istra 1961 (loan)	2018–19	Prva HNL	9	0	0	0	0	0	9	0
Hermannstadt	2019–20	Liga I	19	0	2	0	0	0	21	0
Hermannstadt	2020–21	Liga I	0	0	0	0	0	0	0	0
Hermannstadt	Total		19	0	2	0	0	0	21	0
Bastia-Borgo	2021–22	National	18	0	0	0	0	0	18	0
Career total			263	4	6	0	3	0	272	4

=== International ===
As of match played 6 July 2021

Appearances and goals by national team and year
National team	Year	Apps	Goals
French Guiana	2014	10	0
French Guiana	2015	0	0
French Guiana	2016	4	1
French Guiana	2017	5	0
French Guiana	2018	1	0
French Guiana	2019	2	1
French Guiana	2020	0	0
French Guiana	2021	1	0
Total		23	2

As of 9 September 2019. French Guiana score listed first, score column indicates score after each Rimane goal.

List of international goals scored by Kévin Rimane
No	Date	Venue	Opponent	Score	Result	Competition
1.	19 June 2016	Stade Municipal Dr. Edmard Lama, Remire-Montjoly, French Guiana	Bermuda	1–0	3–0	2017 Caribbean Cup qualification
2.	24 March 2019	BC Place, Vancouver, Canada	Canada	1–1	1–4	2019–20 CONCACAF Nations League qualification

== Honours ==
Paris Saint-Germain

- Ligue 1: 2015–16, 2017–18, 2018–19
- Trophée des Champions: 2018
- Coupe de France runner-up: 2018–19

French Guiana

- Caribbean Cup third place: 2017
