= Loïc Baal =

Footballer (born 1992)

Personal information
- Date of birth: 28 January 1992 (age 34)
- Place of birth: Rouen, France
- Height: 1.77 m (5 ft 10 in)
- Position: Defensive midfielder

Team information
- Current team: Mondorf-les-Bains
- Number: 23

Youth career
- 2007–2012: Nancy

Senior career*
Years	Team	Apps	(Gls)
2010–2012	Nancy B	54	(0)
2012–2013	Le Mans B	29	(2)
2013	Le Mans	2	(0)
2013–2014	Mulhouse	6	(0)
2014–2018	Belfort	87	(5)
2018–2021	Créteil	70	(2)
2018–2020	Créteil B	3	(0)
2021–2023	Le Puy	61	(7)
2024	Colmar	10	(0)
2024–	Mondorf-les-Bains	52	(1)

International career^{‡}
2015–	French Guiana	30	(3)
- * Club domestic league appearances and goals as of 13 June 2026 ‡ National team caps and goals as of 10:40, 4 November 2023 (UTC)

Loïc Baal (born 28 January 1992) is a professional footballer who plays as a defensive midfielder for Luxembourgish club Mondorf-les-Bains. Born in metropolitan France, he plays for the French Guiana national team.

== Club career ==
Baal has previously played for Le Mans, where he made two appearances in Ligue 2, and Mulhouse. He joined Créteil in July 2018.

== International career ==
Baal has played international football with French Guiana, making his debut on 25 March 2015 in a 3–1 win over Honduras in the qualifying tournament for the 2015 Gold Cup.

== Personal life ==
Baal is the younger brother of fellow professional footballer Ludovic Baal.

== Career statistics ==
As of match played 28 May 2022

Appearances and goals by club, season and competition
Club	Season	League			National Cup		Other		Total	
Club	Season	Division	Apps	Goals	Apps	Goals	Apps	Goals	Apps	Goals
Nancy B	2010–11	CFA	25	0	—		—		25	0
Nancy B	2011–12	CFA	29	0	—		—		29	0
Nancy B	Total		54	0	—		—		54	0
Le Mans B	2012–13	CFA	29	2	—		—		29	2
Le Mans	2012–13	Ligue 2	2	0	0	0	0	0	2	0
Mulhouse	2013–14	CFA	6	0	0	0	—		6	0
Belfort	2014–15	CFA	12	0	0	0	—		12	0
Belfort	2015–16	National	21	0	0	0	—		21	0
Belfort	2016–17	National	25	4	1	0	—		26	4
Belfort	2017–18	National 2	29	1	1	0	—		30	1
Belfort	Total		87	5	2	0	—		89	5
Créteil	2018–19	National 2	25	1	2	1	—		27	2
Créteil	2019–20	National	22	1	1	0	—		23	1
Créteil	2020–21	National	23	0	0	0	—		23	0
Créteil	Total		70	2	3	1	—		73	3
Créteil B	2018–19	National 3	2	0	—		—		2	0
Créteil B	2019–20	National 3	1	0	—		—		1	0
Créteil B	Total		3	0	—		—		3	0
Le Puy	2021–22	National 2	28	5	1	0	—		29	5
Career total			279	14	6	1	0	0	285	15

=== International goals ===
Scores and results list French Guiana's goal tally first.

Goal	Date	Venue	Opponent	Score	Result	Competition
1.	22 June 2017	Stade Pierre-Aliker, Fort-de-France, Martinique	Jamaica	1–0	1–1 (2–4 p)	2017 Caribbean Cup

== Honours ==
Le Puy

- Championnat National 2: 2021–22
