= Marie-Rose Carême =

French football manager

Personal information
- Place of birth: France

Managerial career
- Years: Team
- 2010–: ASC Le Geldar
- 2013–2018: French Guiana

Marie-Rose Carême is a French professional football manager.

== Career ==
Since 2010 he was a head coach of the ASC Le Geldar. From 2013 to 2018 he coached the French Guiana national football team together with Jaïr Karam.
