= Roy Contout =

French Guianan international footballer (born 1985)

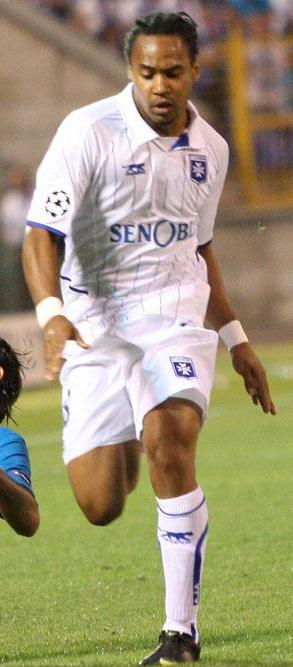

Personal information
- Date of birth: February 11, 1985 (age 41)
- Place of birth: Cayenne, French Guiana
- Height: 1.74 m (5 ft 8 1/2 in)
- Position: Striker

Senior career*
| Years | Team | Apps | (Gls) |
| 2002–2004 | Beauvais | 16 | (0) |
| 2004–2007 | Metz | 39 | (1) |
| 2007–2009 | Amiens | 56 | (7) |
| 2009–2012 | Auxerre | 99 | (11) |
| 2012–2014 | Sochaux | 55 | (5) |
| 2014–2015 | Mouscron-Péruwelz | 15 | (0) |
| 2015–2016 | RS Berkane | 20 | (1) |

International career^{‡}
| 2012– | French Guiana | 14 | (4) |
- * Club domestic league appearances and goals as of July 7, 2017 ‡ National team caps and goals as of July 7, 2017

Roy Contout (born 11 February 1985) is a French Guianan footballer.

== Career ==
Contout began his career with Beauvais and signed in the summer 2004 for FC Metz. After three years with Metz, Contout signed for Amiens SC in summer 2007. On 16 July 2009 Auxerre signed the striker on a free transfer. During his time with Auxerre, he scored a memorable double at high-flying Lille in a 2–1 victory on 28 February 2010. He also played in the UEFA Champions League before leaving for Sochaux on 13 July 2012 after Auxerre's relegation from Ligue 1.

After 2 seasons in yellow, the next club for Contout was Mouscron-Péruwelz of Belgium, whom he joined on 1 September 2014 after being released following Sochaux's relegation to Ligue 2. Following his release from Mouscron in 2015, Contout joined Moroccan side RS Berkane on a free transfer.

=== International goals ===
Scores and results list French Guiana's goal tally first.

| No | Date | Venue | Opponent | Score | Result | Competition |
|---|---|---|---|---|---|---|
| 1. | 9 June 2012 | Stade de Baduel, Cayenne, French Guiana | Suriname | 1–0 | 2–1 | Friendly |
| 2. | 29 March 2016 | Stade Municipal Dr. Edmard Lama, Remire-Montjoly, French Guiana | Cuba | 3–0 | 3–0 | 2017 Caribbean Cup qualification |
| 3. | 19 June 2016 | Stade Municipal Dr. Edmard Lama, Remire-Montjoly, French Guiana | Haiti | 5–2 | 5–2 | 2017 Caribbean Cup qualification |
| 4. | 7 July 2017 | Red Bull Arena, Harrison, United States | Canada | 1–3 | 2–4 | 2017 CONCACAF Gold Cup |

== Honors ==
French Guiana

- Caribbean Cup bronze:2017
