= Grégory Lescot =

French Guianan footballer (born 1989)

Personal information
- Date of birth: 10 May 1989 (age 37)
- Place of birth: Cayenne, French Guiana, France
- Height: 1.80 m (5 ft 11 in)
- Position: Defender

Team information
- Current team: Saint-Pryvé Saint-Hilaire
- Number: 14

Youth career
- CSC de Cayenne

Senior career*
Years	Team	Apps	(Gls)
2008–2009	CSC de Cayenne		
2009–2010	Tours B		
2010–2014	Thouars	50+ (Note: Statistics are missing for the 2010–11 season.)	(2+)
2014–2016	FC Bressuire	40	(0)
2016–2018	Chartres	48	(3)
2018–2019	C'Chartres	29	(1)
2019–2022	Vannes	52	(1)
2022–	Saint-Pryvé Saint-Hilaire	65	(1)

International career^{‡}
2009–	French Guiana	32	(0)
- * Club domestic league appearances and goals as of 08:50, 2 June 2025 (UTC) ‡ National team caps and goals as of 01:08, 21 March 2025 (UTC)

Grégory Lescot (born 10 May 1989) is a French Guianan professional footballer who plays as a defender for Championnat National 1 club Saint-Pryvé Saint-Hilaire and the French Guiana national team.

== International career ==
Lescot made his international debut for French Guiana in 2009. He was part of the squad that participated at the 2017 CONCACAF Gold Cup.
