= Thomas Issorat =

French Guianan footballer (born 1993)

Personal information
- Full name: Thomas Accipe Issorat
- Date of birth: 3 September 1993 (age 33)
- Place of birth: Cayenne, French Guiana
- Height: 1.87 m (6 ft 1 1/2 in)
- Position: Forward

Team information
- Current team: CSC de Cayenne

Youth career
- Marcq-en-Barœul Olympique

Senior career*
Years	Team	Apps	(Gls)
–2016	Marcq-en-Barœul Olympique		
2016–2017	Acren		
2017–2018	La Louvière Centre		
2018–2021	ASC Rémire		
2021–	CSC de Cayenne		

International career^{‡}
2017–	French Guiana	2	(1)
- * Club domestic league appearances and goals as of 8 September 2018 ‡ National team caps and goals as of 8 September 2018

Thomas Accipe Issorat (born 3 September 1993) is a French Guianan footballer who currently plays for CSC de Cayenne in the French Guiana Régional 1 and the French Guiana national team.

== International career ==
Issorat made his national team debut for French Guiana on 23 June 2017 in a 1–1 draw against Jamaica.

Issorat scored his first goal and first competitive goal on 7 September 2018, scoring the opening goal in a 5–0 win against Anguilla, as part of 2019–20 CONCACAF Nations League qualifying.

=== International goals ===
Scores and results list French Guiana's goal tally first.

#	Date	Venue	Opponent	Score	Result	Competition
1.	7 September 2018	Raymond E. Guishard Technical Centre, The Valley, Anguilla	Anguilla	4–0	5–0	2019–20 CONCACAF Nations League qualification
