= Cédric Fabien =

French Guianese footballer (born 1982)

Personal information
- Date of birth: 31 January 1982 (age 44)
- Place of birth: Cayenne, French Guiana
- Height: 1.70 m (5 ft 7 in)
- Position: Midfielder

Youth career
- 1999–2002: Le Mans

Senior career*
Years	Team	Apps	(Gls)
2002–2003	Le Mans	1	(0)
2003–2005	Tours	61	(6)
2005–2010	Brest	91	(5)
2006–2007	→ Entente SSG (loan)	30	(1)
2010–2013	Boulogne	83	(0)
2014–2016	Boulogne	31	(0)
2016–2017	Tarbes	40	(2)
Total		337	(14)

International career
2016–2017	French Guiana	8	(0)
- * Club domestic league appearances and goals

Cédric Fabien (born 31 January 1982) is a French Guianese former professional footballer played as a midfielder. He represented the French Guiana national team.

== Career statistics ==
Appearances and goals by club, season and competition
Club	Season	League			Coupe de France		Coupe de la Ligue		Total	
Club	Season	Division	Apps	Goals	Apps	Goals	Apps	Goals	Apps	Goals
Le Mans	2002–03	Ligue 2	1	0	0	0	0	0	1	0
Tours	2003–04	National	23	1	0	0	0	0	23	1
Tours	2004–05	National	38	5	0	0	0	0	38	5
Tours	Total		61	6	0	0	0	0	61	6
Brest	2005–06	Ligue 2	18	0	1	0	1	0	20	0
Brest	2007–08	Ligue 2	19	3	2	0	0	0	21	3
Brest	2008–09	Ligue 2	33	1	2	0	1	0	36	1
Brest	2009–10	Ligue 2	21	1	5	0	1	0	27	1
Brest	Total		91	5	10	0	3	0	104	5
L'Entente SSG (loan)	2006–07	National	30	1	3	0	0	0	33	1
Boulogne	2010–11	Ligue 2	31	0	3	0	2	0	36	0
Boulogne	2011–12	Ligue 2	28	0	3	0	0	0	31	0
Boulogne	2012–13	National	24	0	4	0	0	0	28	0
Boulogne	2014–15	National	22	0	8	0	0	0	30	0
Boulogne	2015–16	National	9	0	2	0	0	0	11	0
Boulogne	Total		114	0	20	0	2	0	136	0
Tarbes	2016–17	CFA	30	2	1	0	0	0	31	2
Tarbes	2017–18	National 2	10	0	0	0	0	0	10	0
Tarbes	Total		40	2	1	0	0	0	41	2
Career total			337	14	34	0	5	0	376	14

== Honors ==
French Guiana

- Caribbean Cup bronze: 2017
