= Quentin Jakoba =

Curaçaoan footballer

Personal information
- Full name: Quentin Martin Jakoba
- Date of birth: 19 December 1987 (age 38)
- Place of birth: Tilburg, Netherlands
- Height: 1.81 m (5 ft 11 in)
- Position: Defender

Youth career
- FC de Geeren
- SV Advendo
- 2004–2008: Willem II Tilburg

Senior career*
Years	Team	Apps	(Gls)
2008	FC Eindhoven	3	(0)
2009–2014	Kozakken Boys	57	(0)
2014–2015	ASWH	0	(0)
2015–2020	Kozakken Boys	113	(3)
Total		173	(3)

International career
2016–2020	Curaçao	9	(0)

Managerial career
- 2020–2021: Kozakken Boys (fitness coach)
- 2020–2023: Curaçao (fitness coach)
- 2021–2022: NAC Breda (performance coach)
- 2023: Adana Demirspor (athletic coach)
- 2025: Indonesia (performance coach)
- * Club domestic league appearances and goals

Quentin Martin Jakoba (born 19 December 1987) is a Curaçaoan former professional footballer who played on a professional level for Eerste Divisie league club FC Eindhoven during the 2008–2009 season. He later mainly played for Kozakken Boys in the Dutch Tweede Divisie. He was most recently the physical coach of the Indonesian national team.

== International career ==
Jakoba was called up to the Curaçao national football team for March 2017.
