= Jean-David Legrand =

Footballer (born 1991)

Personal information
- Date of birth: 23 February 1991 (age 35)
- Place of birth: Saint-Denis, France
- Height: 1.77 m (5 ft 10 in)
- Position: Full-back

Youth career
- Pôle Espoirs Castelmaurou
- –2010: Toulouse

Senior career*
Years	Team	Apps	(Gls)
2010–2011	Toulouse B	28	(1)
2011–2014	Trélissac	46	(0)
2014–2016	Bergerac	41	(1)
2016–2018	Stade Bordelais	43	(1)
2018–2024	Lège-Cap-Ferret	84	(1)

International career
2014–2023	French Guiana	30	(2)
- * Club domestic league appearances and goals as of 22:02, 19 March 2026 (UTC)

Jean-David Legrand (born 23 February 1991) is a professional footballer who plays as a full-back. Born in metropolitan France, he plays for the French Guiana team.

== Club career ==
Legrand began his career in the youth academy of Toulouse. He played for the club's reserve side. In 2011, he joined Trélissac.

In 2014, Legrand signed for Bergerac. He played for the club until 2016, when he joined Stade Bordelais. In 2018, Legrand joined Lège-Cap-Ferret.

== International career ==
Legrand made his debut for the French Guiana team in 2014. He was included in the team's squad for the 2017 CONCACAF Gold Cup.

== Career statistics ==
=== International ===
Scores and results list French Guiana's goal tally first, score column indicates score after each Legrand goal.

List of international goals scored by Jean-David Legrand
No.	Date	Venue	Opponent	Score	Result	Competition
1	13 November 2014	Montego Bay Sports Complex, Montego Bay, Jamaica	Trinidad and Tobago	2–3	2–4	2014 Caribbean Cup
2	23 March 2023	Stade Municipal Dr. Edmard Lama, Remire-Montjoly, French Guiana	Dominican Republic	1–1	1–1	2022–23 CONCACAF Nations League B
