= 2017 Caribbean Cup =

Scotiabank CFU Men’s Caribbean Cup 2016

Tournament details
- Host country: Martinique
- Dates: 22–25 June 2017
- Teams: 4 (from 1 sub-confederation)
- Venue: 1 (in 1 host city)

Final positions
- Champions: Curaçao (1st title)
- Runners-up: Jamaica
- Third place: French Guiana
- Fourth place: Martinique

Tournament statistics
- Matches played: 4
- Goals scored: 9 (2.25 per match)
- Top scorer(s): (Curaçao) Elson Hooi (2 goals)
- Best player: (Curaçao) Gino van Kessel
- Best goalkeeper: (Curaçao) Eloy Room

The 2017 Caribbean Cup was the 19th and final edition of the Caribbean Cup, the biennial international men's football championship of the Caribbean region organized by the Caribbean Football Union (CFU).

The top four teams qualified for the 2017 CONCACAF Gold Cup, while the fifth-placed team advanced to a play-off against the fifth-placed team from the 2017 Copa Centroamericana for the final Gold Cup berth.

The host for the final round was expected to be announced in January 2016.

Martinique was announced as host on 25 January 2017, winning over bids of Curaçao and French Guiana. The draw for the semi-finals was also conducted on the same day at the CFU office in St. John's, Antigua and Barbuda.

Curaçao won their first and only title following a 2–1 win over Jamaica in the final.

== Qualification ==
=== Qualified teams ===
Four teams qualified for the final tournament. All four teams also qualified for the 2017 CONCACAF Gold Cup.

Team	Qualification	Caribbean Cup final stage appearances	Previous best performance	FIFA Ranking at start of event
Jamaica	Third round Group 1 winners	16th	Champion (**1991**, **1998**, 2005, **2008**, 2010, **2014**)	79
French Guiana	Third round Group 2 winners	4th	Fifth place (2014)	N/A^{2}
Curaçao	Third round Group 3 winners	4th^{1}	Fourth place (1989)	70
Martinique	Third round Group 4 winners	13th	Champions (1993)	N/A^{2}

Bold indicates that the corresponding team was hosting or co-hosting the event.
1. This is Curaçao's second appearance since the dissolution of the Netherlands Antilles, as its direct successor (with regards to membership in football associations), inheriting the former nation's FIFA membership and competitive record.
2. French Guiana and Martinique are not FIFA members, and so do not have a FIFA Ranking.

== Venues ==
The matches are played at Stade Pierre-Aliker, Fort-de-France.

(Martinique) Fort-de-France
Stade Pierre-Aliker
Capacity: 16,300

== Knockout stage ==
If tied after 90 minutes, extra time was played, and if still tied after extra time, a penalty shoot-out was used to determine the winner.

=== Bracket ===
Semi-finals
22 June
Jamaica (pen.)	1 (4)
French Guiana	1 (2)
22 June
Curaçao	2
Martinique	1

Final
25 June
Jamaica	1
Curaçao	2
Third place
25 June
French Guiana	1
Martinique	0

All times AST (UTC−4).

=== Semi-finals ===
22 June 2017
18:00

Jamaica	1–1 (a.e.t.)	French Guiana
Johnson 70'	Report	L. Baal 21'
Penalties
Binns (penalty missed); Gordon (penalty scored); Nicholson (penalty scored); Fisher (penalty scored); Burke (penalty scored)	4–2	(penalty missed) Evens; (penalty scored) Issorat; (penalty missed) Legrand; (penalty scored) Fabien

Stade Pierre-Aliker, Fort-de-France
Attendance: 5,200
Referee: Wilson Da Costa (Bahamas)

22 June 2017
20:30

Curaçao	2–1	Martinique
Nepomuceno 57' (pen.); Janga 76'	Report	Arquin 17'

Stade Pierre-Aliker, Fort-de-France
Attendance: 5,500
Referee: Ricangel de Leça (Aruba)

=== Third-place playoff ===
25 June 2017
17:00

French Guiana	1–0	Martinique
Privat 74'	Report

Stade Pierre-Aliker, Fort-de-France
Attendance: 5,500
Referee: Sherwin Moore (Guyana)

=== Final ===
25 June 2017
19:30

Jamaica	1–2	Curaçao
Harriott 82'	Report	Hooi 10', 84'

Stade Pierre-Aliker, Fort-de-France
Attendance: 5,200
Referee: Michel Rodríguez (Cuba)

2017 Caribbean Cup winner

Curaçao
First title

== Goalscorers ==
2 goals

- (Curaçao) Elson Hooi

1 goal

- (Curaçao) Rangelo Janga
- (Curaçao) Gevaro Nepomuceno
- (French Guiana) Loïc Baal
- (French Guiana) Sloan Privat
- (Jamaica) Rosario Harriott
- (Jamaica) Jermaine Johnson
- (Martinique) Yoann Arquin

== Prize money ==
On 25 June 2017, it was announced that national associations would receive the following prize money amounts.

Final position	Amount (US Dollars)
Winner	$40,000
Runner-up	$30,000
Third-place	$25,000
Fourth-place	$20,000
