= Jaïr Karam =

French Guianan footballer (born 1976)

Personal information
- Date of birth: 1 March 1976 (age 50)
- Place of birth: Kourou, French Guiana
- Position: Goalkeeper

Team information
- Current team: Le Havre U19 (manager)

International career
Years	Team	Apps	(Gls)
2004–2005	French Guiana		

Managerial career
- 2013–2018: French Guiana
- 2018–2020: Stade Poitevin
- 2021–2022: FC Chamalières
- 2022–2023: Le Havre B
- 2023–: Le Havre U19

Jaïr Karam (born 1 March 1976) is a French Guianan football manager and former player who coaches the Le Havre under-19 team. A goalkeeper, he made three appearances for the French Guiana national team. From 2013 to 2018 he coached the French Guiana national team. Since July 2018 he has been coach of Stade Poitevin.
