= 2017 CONCACAF Gold Cup =

14th edition of the CONCACAF Gold Cup

Tournament details
- Host country: United States
- Dates: July 7–26
- Teams: 12 (from 1 confederation)
- Venues: 14 (in 14 host cities)

Final positions
- Champions: United States (6th title)
- Runners-up: Jamaica

Tournament statistics
- Matches played: 25
- Goals scored: 58 (2.32 per match)
- Attendance: 875,667 (35,027 per match)
- Top scorer(s): (Canada) Alphonso Davies (Martinique) Kévin Parsemain (United States) Jordan Morris (3 goals each)
- Best player: (United States) Michael Bradley
- Best young player: (Canada) Alphonso Davies
- Best goalkeeper: (Jamaica) Andre Blake
- Fair play award: United States

The 2017 CONCACAF Gold Cup was the 14th edition of the CONCACAF Gold Cup, the biennial international men's soccer championship of the North, Central American and Caribbean region organized by CONCACAF, and 24th CONCACAF regional championship overall. The tournament was played between July 7–26, 2017 in the United States.

The United States won their sixth title with their 2–1 victory over Jamaica in the final.

== Qualified teams ==
A total of twelve teams qualified for the tournament. Three berths were allocated to North America, four to Central America, four to the Caribbean, and one to the winners of the play-off between the two fifth-placed teams of the Caribbean zone and the Central American zone.

Team	Qualification	Appearances (+ CONCACAF Championship)	Last appearance	Previous best performance	FIFA Ranking
North American zone
United States	Automatic	14th (16th)	2015	Champions (**1991**, **2002**, **2005**, **2007**, **2013**); Runners-up (1989)	35
Mexico (TH)	Automatic	14th (22nd)	2015	Champions (**1993**, 1996, 1998, **2003**, 2009, 2011, 2015); Champions (1965, 1971, **1977**)	16
Canada	Automatic	13th (16th)	2015	Champions (2000); Champions (1985)	100
Central American zone qualified through the 2017 Copa Centroamericana
Honduras	Winners	13th (19th)	2015	Runners-up (1991); Champions (**1981**)	72
Panama	Runners-up	8th (9th)	2015	Runners-up (2005, 2013)	52
El Salvador	Third Place	10th (16th)	2015	Quarterfinals (2002, 2003, 2011, 2013); Runners-up (1963, 1981)	103
Costa Rica	Fourth Place	13th (19th)	2015	Runners-up (2002); Champions (1963, **1969**, 1989)	26
Caribbean zone qualified through the 2017 Caribbean Cup
Curaçao	Winners	1st (5th)^{1}	None	Debut; Third place (1963, 1969)	68
Jamaica	Runners-up	10th (12th)	2015	Runners-up (2015)	76
French Guiana	Third Place	1st (1st)	None	Debut	N/A^{2}
Martinique	Fourth Place	5th (5th)	2013	Quarterfinals (2002)	N/A^{2}
Play-off winners between Caribbean zone fifth place and Central American zone fifth place
Nicaragua	Play-off	2nd (4th)	2009	Group stage (2009); Sixth place (1967)	105

Bold indicates that the corresponding team was hosting the event.
1. This was Curaçao's first appearance since the dissolution of the Netherlands Antilles, as its direct successor (with regards to membership in football associations), inheriting the former nation's FIFA membership and competitive record.
2. French Guiana and Martinique are not FIFA members, and so did not have a FIFA Ranking.

== Venues ==
The venues were announced on December 19, 2016. Levi's Stadium in Santa Clara was announced as the venue of the final on February 1, 2017.

Arlington	Cleveland	Denver	Frisco	Glendale
AT&T Stadium	FirstEnergy Stadium (Note: This was the first time the stadium hosted a Gold Cup match.)	Sports Authority Field	Toyota Stadium	University of Phoenix Stadium
32°44′52″N 97°5′34″W	41°30′22″N 81°41′58″W	39°44′38″N 105°1′12″W	33°9′16″N 96°50′7″W	33°31′39″N 112°15′45″W
Capacity: 100,000	Capacity: 67,431	Capacity: 76,125	Capacity: 16,000	Capacity: 63,400
Harrison	Location of the host cities of the 2017 CONCACAF Gold Cup. Group stage venue Quarter-final venue Semi-final venue Final venue			Houston
Red Bull Arena	Location of the host cities of the 2017 CONCACAF Gold Cup. Group stage venue Quarter-final venue Semi-final venue Final venue			BBVA Compass Stadium
40°44′12″N 74°9′1″W	Location of the host cities of the 2017 CONCACAF Gold Cup. Group stage venue Quarter-final venue Semi-final venue Final venue			29°45′8″N 95°21′9″W
Capacity: 25,000	Location of the host cities of the 2017 CONCACAF Gold Cup. Group stage venue Quarter-final venue Semi-final venue Final venue			Capacity: 22,000
Nashville	Location of the host cities of the 2017 CONCACAF Gold Cup. Group stage venue Quarter-final venue Semi-final venue Final venue			Pasadena
Nissan Stadium	Location of the host cities of the 2017 CONCACAF Gold Cup. Group stage venue Quarter-final venue Semi-final venue Final venue			Rose Bowl
36°9′59″N 86°46′17″W	Location of the host cities of the 2017 CONCACAF Gold Cup. Group stage venue Quarter-final venue Semi-final venue Final venue			34°9′41″N 118°10′3″W
Capacity: 69,000	Location of the host cities of the 2017 CONCACAF Gold Cup. Group stage venue Quarter-final venue Semi-final venue Final venue			Capacity: 90,000
Philadelphia	San Antonio	San Diego	Santa Clara	Tampa
Lincoln Financial Field	Alamodome	Qualcomm Stadium	Levi's Stadium	Raymond James Stadium
39°54′3″N 75°10′3″W	29°25′1″N 98°28′44″W	32°46′59″N 117°7′10″W	37°24′11″N 121°58′12″W	27°58′33″N 82°30′12″W
Capacity: 69,596	Capacity: 65,000	Capacity: 70,561	Capacity: 68,500	Capacity: 65,890

== Draw ==
The United States and Mexico were announced as the seeded teams of Groups B and C respectively on December 19, 2016. Honduras, the winners of the 2017 Copa Centroamericana title were announced as being the seeded team in Group A on February 14, 2017.

The groups and match schedule were revealed on March 7, 2017, 10:00 PST (UTC−8), at Levi's Stadium in Santa Clara, California. At the time of the announcement, 11 of the 12 qualified teams were known, with the identity of the CFU–UNCAF play-off winners not yet known.

Seeded teams
Group A	Honduras
Group B	United States
Group C	Mexico

== Squads ==
The twelve national teams involved in the tournament were required to register a squad of 23 players; only players in these squads were eligible to take part in the tournament.

A provisional list of forty players per national team was submitted to CONCACAF by June 2, 2017. The final list of 23 players per national team was submitted to CONCACAF by June 27, 2017. Three players per national team had to be goalkeepers.

National teams that reached the quarter-final stage were able to swap up to six players in the final squad with six players from the provisional list within 24 hours of their final group stage game.

== Match officials ==
The match officials, which included 17 referees and 25 assistant referees, were announced on June 23, 2017.

Referees

- (Canada) Drew Fischer
- (Costa Rica) Ricardo Montero
- (Cuba) Yadel Martínez
- (Guatemala) Walter López
- (Honduras) Melvin Matamoros
- (Honduras) Óscar Moncada
- (Honduras) Héctor Rodríguez
- (Mexico) Roberto García Orozco
- (Mexico) Fernando Guerrero
- (Mexico) César Ramos
- (Panama) John Pitti
- (Saint Kitts and Nevis) Kimbell Ward
- (El Salvador) Joel Aguilar
- (United States) Mark Geiger
- (United States) Jair Marrufo
- (United States) Armando Villarreal

Assistant Referees

- (Costa Rica) Carlos Fernández
- (Costa Rica) Juan Carlos Mora
- (Guatemala) Hermenerito Lea
- (Guatemala) Gerson López
- (Honduras) Melvyn Cruz
- (Honduras) Christian Ramírez
- (Honduras) Jesús Tábora
- (Mexico) José Luis Camargo
- (Mexico) Miguel Hernández
- (Mexico) Alberto Morín
- (Mexico) Marcos Quintero
- (Mexico) Marvin Torrentera
- (Panama) Ronald Bruna
- (Panama) Gabriel Victoria
- (Panama) Daniel Williamson
- (Saint Kitts and Nevis) Graeme Browne
- (El Salvador) Geonvany García
- (El Salvador) William Torres
- (El Salvador) Juan Francisco Zumba
- (Trinidad and Tobago) Joseph Bertrand
- (Trinidad and Tobago) Ainsley Rochard
- (United States) Frank Anderson
- (United States) Charles Morgante
- (United States) Corey Rockwell

== Group stage ==
The top two teams from each group and the two best third-placed teams qualified for the quarter-finals.

All match times listed are in EDT (UTC−4). If the venue is located in a different time zone, the local time is also given.

=== Tiebreakers ===
The ranking of each team in each group was determined as follows:

1. Greatest number of points obtained in group matches
2. Goal difference in all group matches
3. Greatest number of goals scored in all group matches
4. Greatest number of points obtained in group matches between the teams concerned;
5. Drawing of lots by the Gold Cup Committee

=== Group A ===
Pos	Team	Pld	W	D	L	GF	GA	GD	Pts	Qualification
1	Costa Rica	3	2	1	0	5	1	+4	7	Advance to knockout stage
2	Canada	3	1	2	0	5	3	+2	5	Advance to knockout stage
3	Honduras	3	1	1	1	3	1	+2	4	Advance to knockout stage
4	French Guiana	3	0	0	3	2	10	−8	0	

Source: CONCACAF
July 7, 2017
19:00

French Guiana	2–4	Canada
Contout 69'; Privat 71'	Report	Jakovic 28'; Arfield 45+1'; Davies 60', 86'

Red Bull Arena, Harrison
Attendance: 25,817
Referee: John Pitti (Panama)
July 7, 2017
21:00

Honduras	0–1	Costa Rica
	Report	Ureña 39'

Red Bull Arena, Harrison
Attendance: 25,817
Referee: Walter López (Guatemala)

July 11, 2017
19:30
18:30 CDT (UTC−5)

Costa Rica	1–1	Canada
Calvo 42'	Report	Davies 26'

BBVA Compass Stadium, Houston
Attendance: 12,019
Referee: Mark Geiger (United States)
July 11, 2017
22:00
21:00 CDT (UTC−5)

Honduras	3–0 Awarded (Note: CONCACAF awarded Honduras a 3–0 win as a result of French Guiana fielding the ineligible player Florent Malouda, after the match had finished 0–0. Malouda had previously represented France and did not meet eligibility rules.)	French Guiana
	Report

BBVA Compass Stadium, Houston
Attendance: 12,019
Referee: Yadel Martínez (Cuba)

July 14, 2017
19:30
18:30 CDT (UTC−5)

Costa Rica	3–0	French Guiana
Rodríguez 4'; Wallace 79'; Ramírez 83'	Report

Toyota Stadium, Frisco
Attendance: 10,098
Referee: César Ramos (Mexico)
July 14, 2017
22:00
21:00 CDT (UTC−5)

Canada	0–0	Honduras
	Report

Toyota Stadium, Frisco
Attendance: 10,098
Referee: Joel Aguilar (El Salvador)

=== Group B ===
Pos	Team	Pld	W	D	L	GF	GA	GD	Pts	Qualification
1	United States (H)	3	2	1	0	7	3	+4	7	Advance to knockout stage
2	Panama	3	2	1	0	6	2	+4	7	Advance to knockout stage
3	Martinique	3	1	0	2	4	6	−2	3	
4	Nicaragua	3	0	0	3	1	7	−6	0	

Source: CONCACAF
(H) Hosts
July 8, 2017
16:30
15:30 CDT (UTC−5)

United States	1–1	Panama
Dwyer 50'	Report	Camargo 60'

Nissan Stadium, Nashville
Attendance: 47,622
Referee: Fernando Guerrero (Mexico)
July 8, 2017
19:00
18:00 CDT (UTC−5)

Martinique	2–0	Nicaragua
Parsemain 35'; Langil 66'	Report

Nissan Stadium, Nashville
Attendance: 47,622
Referee: Kimbell Ward (Saint Kitts and Nevis)

July 12, 2017
18:30

Panama	2–1	Nicaragua
Díaz 49'; Torres 57'	Report	Chavarría 48'

Raymond James Stadium, Tampa
Attendance: 23,368
Referee: Drew Fischer (Canada)
July 12, 2017
20:30

United States	3–2	Martinique
O. Gonzalez 53'; Morris 64', 76'	Report	Parsemain 66', 74'

Raymond James Stadium, Tampa
Attendance: 23,368
Referee: Henry Bejarano (Costa Rica)

July 15, 2017
16:30

Panama	3–0	Martinique
Murillo 44'; Arroyo 60'; Torres 67'	Report

FirstEnergy Stadium, Cleveland
Attendance: 27,934
Referee: Roberto García (Mexico)
July 15, 2017
19:00

Nicaragua	0–3	United States
	Report	Corona 37'; Rowe 56'; Miazga 88'

FirstEnergy Stadium, Cleveland
Attendance: 27,934
Referee: Melvin Matamoros (Honduras)

=== Group C ===
Pos	Team	Pld	W	D	L	GF	GA	GD	Pts	Qualification
1	Mexico	3	2	1	0	5	1	+4	7	Advance to knockout stage
2	Jamaica	3	1	2	0	3	1	+2	5	Advance to knockout stage
3	El Salvador	3	1	1	1	4	4	0	4	Advance to knockout stage
4	Curaçao	3	0	0	3	0	6	−6	0	

Source: CONCACAF
July 9, 2017
19:00
16:00 PDT (UTC−7)

Curaçao	0–2	Jamaica
	Report	Williams 58'; Mattocks 73'

Qualcomm Stadium, San Diego
Attendance: 53,133
Referee: Armando Villarreal (United States)
July 9, 2017
21:00
18:00 PDT (UTC−7)

Mexico	3–1	El Salvador
Marín 8'; E. Hernández 29'; Pineda 55'	Report	Bonilla 10'

Qualcomm Stadium, San Diego
Attendance: 53,133
Referee: Óscar Moncada (Honduras)

July 13, 2017
20:00
18:00 MDT (UTC−6)

El Salvador	2–0	Curaçao
Mayen 21'; Zelaya 24'	Report

Sports Authority Field, Denver
Attendance: 49,121
Referee: Héctor Rodríguez (Honduras)
July 13, 2017
22:00
20:00 MDT (UTC−6)

Mexico	0–0	Jamaica
	Report

Sports Authority Field, Denver
Attendance: 49,121
Referee: Ricardo Montero (Costa Rica)

July 16, 2017
18:00
17:00 CDT (UTC−5)

Jamaica	1–1	El Salvador
Mattocks 63' (pen.)	Report	Bonilla 15'

Alamodome, San Antonio
Attendance: 44,232
Referee: Jair Marrufo (United States)
July 16, 2017
20:00
19:00 CDT (UTC−5)

Curaçao	0–2	Mexico
	Report	Sepúlveda 22'; Álvarez 90+1'

Alamodome, San Antonio
Attendance: 44,232
Referee: Kimbell Ward (Saint Kitts and Nevis)

=== Ranking of third-placed teams ===
The best two third-placed teams which advanced to the knockout stage played the winners from another group in the quarter-finals.

Pos	Grp	Team	Pld	W	D	L	GF	GA	GD	Pts	Qualification
1	A	Honduras	3	1	1	1	3	1	+2	4	Advance to knockout stage
2	C	El Salvador	3	1	1	1	4	4	0	4	Advance to knockout stage
3	B	Martinique	3	1	0	2	4	6	−2	3	

Source: CONCACAF
Rules for classification: 1) Points; 2) Goal difference; 3) Goals scored; 4) Drawing of lots.

== Knockout stage ==
In the quarter-finals and semi-finals, if a match was tied after 90 minutes, extra time would not have been played and the match would be decided by a penalty shoot-out. In the final, if the match was tied after 90 minutes, extra time would have been played, where each team would have been allowed to make a fourth substitution. If still tied after extra time, the match would have been decided by a penalty shoot-out. Unlike the previous edition of the competition, there was no third place play-off.

Quarter-finals
July 19 – Philadelphia
Costa Rica	1
Panama	0
July 19 – Philadelphia
United States	2
El Salvador	0
July 20 – Glendale
Mexico	1
Honduras	0
July 20 – Glendale
Jamaica	2
Canada	1

Semi-finals
July 22 – Arlington
Costa Rica	0
United States	2
July 23 – Pasadena
Mexico	0
Jamaica	1

Final
July 26 – Santa Clara
United States	2
Jamaica	1

=== Quarter-finals ===
July 19, 2017
18:00

Costa Rica	1–0	Panama
Godoy 77' (o.g.)	Report

Lincoln Financial Field, Philadelphia
Attendance: 31,615
Referee: Óscar Moncada (Honduras)

July 19, 2017
21:00

United States	2–0	El Salvador
O. Gonzalez 41'; Lichaj 45+2'	Report

Lincoln Financial Field, Philadelphia
Attendance: 31,615
Referee: Drew Fischer (Canada)

July 20, 2017
19:30
16:30 MST (UTC−7)

Jamaica	2–1	Canada
Francis 6'; Williams 50'	Report	Hoilett 61'

State Farm Stadium, Glendale
Attendance: 37,404
Referee: Ricardo Montero (Costa Rica)

July 20, 2017
22:30
19:30 MST (UTC−7)

Mexico	1–0	Honduras
Pizarro 4'	Report

State Farm Stadium, Glendale
Attendance: 37,404
Referee: Walter López (Guatemala)

=== Semi-finals ===
July 22, 2017
22:00
21:00 CDT (UTC−5)

Costa Rica	0–2	United States
	Report	Altidore 72'; Dempsey 82'

AT&T Stadium, Arlington
Attendance: 45,516
Referee: Joel Aguilar (El Salvador)

July 23, 2017
21:00
18:00 PDT (UTC−7)

Mexico	0–1	Jamaica
	Report	Lawrence 88'

Rose Bowl, Pasadena
Attendance: 42,393
Referee: John Pitti (Panama)

=== Final ===
July 26, 2017
21:30
18:30 PDT (UTC−7)

United States	2–1	Jamaica
Altidore 45'; Morris 88'	Report	Watson 50'

Levi's Stadium, Santa Clara
Attendance: 63,032
Referee: Walter López (Guatemala)

== Goalscorers ==
There were 55 goals scored in 25 matches, for an average of 2.2 goals per match.

3 goals

- (Canada) Alphonso Davies
- (Martinique) Kévin Parsemain
- (United States) Jordan Morris

2 goals

- (El Salvador) Nelson Bonilla
- (Jamaica) Darren Mattocks
- (Jamaica) Romario Williams
- (Panama) Gabriel Torres
- (United States) Omar Gonzalez
- (United States) Jozy Altidore

1 goal

- (Canada) Scott Arfield
- (Canada) Junior Hoilett
- (Canada) Dejan Jakovic
- (Costa Rica) Francisco Calvo
- (Costa Rica) David Ramírez
- (Costa Rica) Ariel Francisco Rodríguez
- (Costa Rica) Marco Ureña
- (Costa Rica) Rodney Wallace
- (El Salvador) Gerson Mayen
- (El Salvador) Rodolfo Zelaya
- (French Guiana) Roy Contout
- (French Guiana) Sloan Privat
- (Jamaica) Shaun Francis
- (Jamaica) Kemar Lawrence
- (Jamaica) Je-Vaughn Watson
- (Martinique) Steeven Langil
- (Mexico) Edson Álvarez
- (Mexico) Elías Hernández
- (Mexico) Hedgardo Marín
- (Mexico) Orbelín Pineda
- (Mexico) Rodolfo Pizarro
- (Mexico) Ángel Sepúlveda
- (Nicaragua) Carlos Chavarría
- (Panama) Abdiel Arroyo
- (Panama) Miguel Camargo
- (Panama) Ismael Díaz
- (Panama) Michael Amir Murillo
- (United States) Joe Corona
- (United States) Clint Dempsey
- (United States) Dom Dwyer
- (United States) Eric Lichaj
- (United States) Matt Miazga
- (United States) Kelyn Rowe

1 own goal

- (Panama) Aníbal Godoy (against Costa Rica)

== Awards ==
=== Winners ===
2017 CONCACAF Gold Cup winners

United States
Sixth title

=== Individual awards ===
The following awards were given at the conclusion of the tournament.

- Golden Ball Award: (United States) Michael Bradley
- Golden Boot Award: (Canada) Alphonso Davies
- Golden Glove Award: (Jamaica) Andre Blake
- Young Player Award: (Canada) Alphonso Davies
- Fair Play Award: United States

=== Best XI ===
The technical study group selected the tournament's best XI.

Goalkeeper	Defenders	Midfielders	Attackers
(Jamaica) Andre Blake	(United States) Graham Zusi; (United States) Omar Gonzalez; (Jamaica) Jermaine Taylor; (Jamaica) Kemar Lawrence	(United States) Darlington Nagbe; (Mexico) Jesús Dueñas; (United States) Michael Bradley; (Canada) Alphonso Davies	(United States) Jozy Altidore; (United States) Jordan Morris

== Sponsors ==
- Allstate
- Gatorade
- Cerveza Modelo de México
- Nike, Inc.
- Post Consumer Holdings
- Scotiabank
- Sprint Corporation

== Theme songs ==
"The Arena" and "Don't Let This Feeling Fade" by American violinist Lindsey Stirling served as the official songs of the tournament. The latter features Rivers Cuomo of the band Weezer and rapper Lecrae.

"Bia Beraghsim" by Persian-Swedish singer Mahan Moin served as the official anthem of the tournament

"Levántate" by Puerto Rican singer Gale served as the official Spanish-language song of the tournament.

"Thunder" and "Whatever It Takes" by American rock band Imagine Dragons also served as official anthems of the tournament.
