= Stade Pierre-Aliker =

Stadium in Fort-de-France, Martinique

- Interactive map of Stade Pierre-Aliker
- Former names: Stade de Dillon
- Location: Fort-de-France, Martinique
- Coordinates: 14.6031445°N 61.0460901°W
- Owner: Fort-de-France City Hall
- Capacity: 16,300
- Surface: Grass

Construction
- Built: 1985–1993
- Opened: 10 June 1993; 33 years ago
- Architect: Alex-Pierre Louis

Tenants
- Club Colonial; Martinique national football team

Stade Pierre-Aliker (until 2007 Stade d'Honneur de Dillon), is a multi-purpose stadium in Fort-de-France, Martinique. It is currently used mostly for football matches, as the home of the Club Colonial and the Martinique national football team. The stadium has a capacity of 16,300.
