= French Guiana national football team =

Men's association football team

French Guiana
- Nickname(s): Les Yana Dòkòs (The Yana Dòkòs)
- Association: Ligue de Football de la Guyane (LFG)
- Confederation: CONCACAF (North America)
- Sub-confederation: CFU (Caribbean)
- Head coach: Stéphane D'Urbano
- Captain: Donovan Léon
- Most caps: Rhudy Evens (63)
- Top scorer: Gary Pigrée (16)
- Home stadium: Stade Georges-Chaumet
- FIFA code: GUF
First colours	Second colours

First international
- (France) French Guiana 1–3 Suriname (Netherlands) (French Guiana; 1 January 1936)

Biggest win
- French Guiana 11–1 Saint Pierre and Miquelon (Saint-Ouen-l'Aumône, France; 26 September 2012)

Biggest defeat
- (Netherlands) Suriname 9–0 French Guiana (France) (Surinam; 2 March 1947)

CONCACAF Gold Cup
- Appearances: 1 (first in 2017)
- Best result: Group stage (2017)

CFU Championship / Caribbean Cup
- Appearances: 5 (first in 1983)
- Best result: Third place (1983, 2017)
Medal record
CFU Championship / Caribbean Cup
Bronze medal – third place	1983 French Guiana	Team
Bronze medal – third place	2017 Martinique	Team

The French Guiana national football team (French: Sélection de Guyane de football) represents French Guiana (a French overseas department) in men's international football. The team is governed by the Ligue de football de la Guyane (English: Football League of Guiana) founded in 1962, the local branch of the FFF. It has been an associate member of CONCACAF since 1978 and became a full member in 2013, but is not a member of FIFA. Regionally, it is an affiliate member of CFU in the Caribbean Zone.

French Guiana has qualified once for the CONCACAF Gold Cup in 2017, and has also participated once in League A and three times in League B of the CONCACAF Nations League. Regionally, the team finished third place in the 1983 CFU Championship and also in the 2017 Caribbean Cup. The French Guiana cannot participate in World Cup qualifiers or FIFA global competitions, as it is not a FIFA member.

== Overview ==
As an overseas department of the French Republic, it is an integral part of France and thus not a member of FIFA. French Guiana is therefore not eligible to enter a team in the FIFA World Cup independent of France. As full citizens of France, indistinguishable from any other French citizen, French Guianans are eligible to play for the France national football team.

Bernard Lama, Mike Maignan and Florent Malouda are three examples of Guianese players who have played for the France national team; Maignan is currently the first choice goalkeeper for the France national team and won the UEFA Nations league 2020–21 with the team; Lama was a member of the 1998 World Cup and UEFA Euro 2000 winning squads while Malouda played for the French team that finished runner-up in the 2006 World Cup.

== Team image ==
=== Kit sponsorship ===
Kit supplier	Period
(Germany) Uhlsport	2001
(Italy) ABM	2014
(Italy) Erreà	2016
(United States) Nike	2017–2022
(Guadeloupe) Ballers Pride	2024–2026
(French Guiana) Flexcible	2026-present

== CONCACAF ==
While it is not a member of FIFA, French Guiana is a member of CONCACAF and CFU, and thus eligible for all competitions organized by both. For any purpose outside of World Cup competition, all of the regional continental confederations may allow teams to be entered by territories that are de jure part of a country, the bulk of which is located in a different continental confederation region.

According to the status of the FFF (article 34, paragraph 6): "[...]Under the control of related continental confederations, and with the agreement of the FFF, those leagues can organize international sport events at a regional level or set up teams in order to participate to them."

== Results and fixtures ==
The following is a list of match results in the last 12 months, as well as any future matches that have been scheduled.

Win Draw Loss Fixture

=== 2026 ===
26 September 2026–27 CONCACAF Nations League	Saint Vincent and the Grenadines	2–1	French Guiana	Belmopan, Belize
17:00 UTC−4	O. Anderson 14', 29'	Report	Y. Nozile 63'	Stadium: FFB Stadium

29 September 2026–27 CONCACAF Nations League	French Guiana	1–0	Sint Maarten	Belmopan, Belize
17:00 UTC−4	Haabo 90+5'	Report		Stadium: FFB Stadium; Referee: Raúl Castro (Honduras)

3 October 2026–27 CONCACAF Nations League	Belize	0–2	French Guiana	Belmopan, Belize
22:00 UTC−4		Report	Anakaba 78'; Haabo 84'	Stadium: FFB Stadium; Attendance: 553; Referee: Richard Tejada (Panama)

6 October 2026–27 CONCACAF Nations League	French Guiana	1–0	Belize	Belmopan, Belize
22:00 UTC−4	Nozile 84'	Report		Stadium: FFB Stadium; Referee: Waldir García (El Salvador)

14 November 2026–27 CONCACAF Nations League	Sint Maarten	1–5	French Guiana	Kingstown, Saint Vincent and the Grenadines
				Stadium: Arnos Vale Stadium

17 November 2026–27 CONCACAF Nations League	French Guiana	1–0	Saint Vincent and the Grenadines	Kingstown, Saint Vincent and the Grenadines
				Stadium: Arnos Vale Stadium

== Coaching history ==
- (French Guiana) Marie-Rose Carême (2004–2005)
- (French Guiana) Ghislain Zulémaro (2008–2010)
- (French Guiana) Steeve Falgayrettes^{*} (2011–2012)
- (French Guiana) François Louis-Marie & (French Guiana) Hubert Contout (2012–2013)
- (French Guiana) Jaïr Karam & (France) Marie-Rose Carême (2013–2018)
- (France) Thierry De Neef (2018–2022)
- (French Guiana) Jean-Claude Darcheville (2022–2025)
- (France) Stéphane D'Urbano (2025–present)

== Players ==
=== Current squad ===
The following players were called up for the 2026–27 CONCACAF Nations League A matches against Sint Maarten and Saint Vincent and the Grenadines on 14 and 17 November 2026, respectively.

Caps and goals correct as of 14 October 2024, after the match against Nicaragua

No.	Pos.	Player	Date of birth (age)	Caps	Goals	Club
	GK	Donovan Léon	3 November 1992 (age 34)	37	0	(Saudi Arabian Football Federation) Abha
	GK	Stéphane Roman	3 March 1988 (age 38)	6	0	(Ligue de football de la Guyane) Sinnamary
	DF	Mickaël Colino	17 December 1997 (age 28)	25	0	(French Football Federation) Périgueux
	DF	Thomas Vancaeyezeele	27 July 1994 (age 32)	16	0	(United States Soccer Federation) Brooklyn FC
	DF	Yohan Marmot	22 July 1999 (age 27)	15	0	(Royal Belgian Football Association) Mons
	DF	Yoann Salmier	21 November 1992 (age 33)	4	0	(French Football Federation) Clermont
	DF	Ericsson Thervilus	29 November 2000 (age 25)	4	0	(Ligue de football de la Guyane) Rémire
	DF	Donovan Sini	20 April 2003 (age 23)	2	0	(Ligue de football de la Guyane) Cosma
	MF	Zedan Charlec	8 December 1999 (age 26)	23	0	(Ligue de football de la Guyane) Étoile de Matoury
	MF	Jules Haabo	12 April 1997 (age 29)	19	9	(Ligue de football de la Guyane) Étoile de Matoury
	MF	Thomas Torvic	9 January 1999 (age 27)	4	1	(Ligue de football de la Guyane) Sinnamary
	MF	Marcio Andelmon	17 May 2002 (age 24)	2	0	(Ligue de football de la Guyane) Agouado
	MF	Robinho Besini	28 March 2005 (age 21)	2	0	(French Football Federation) Chalon
	MF	Guy Anakaba	23 January 2006 (age 20)	0	0	(Ligue de football de la Guyane) Le Geldar
	FW	Joël Sarrucco	18 November 1990 (age 36)	29	10	(Ligue de football de la Guyane) Rémire
	FW	Yvelin Nozile	19 March 1997 (age 29)	19	2	(Ligue de football de la Guyane) Agouado
	FW	Calvin Soga	18 January 1995 (age 31)	7	0	(Ligue de football de la Guyane) Étoile de Matoury
	FW	Max Gourpil	5 October 1992 (age 34)	6	0	(Ligue de football de la Guyane) Le Geldar
	FW	Armando Pinas	14 October 1998 (age 28)	2	0	(Ligue de football de la Guyane) Agouado
	FW	Jean-Yves Monimofou	12 July 2001 (age 25)	0	0	(Ligue de football de la Guyane) Cosma

=== Recent call-ups ===
The following players have also been called up to the French Guiana squad within the last twelve months.

Pos.	Player	Date of birth (age)	Caps	Goals	Club	Latest call-up
GK	Kayne Bonnevie	22 July 2001 (age 25)	2	0	(France) Limonest	v. Belize, 6 October 2026
GK	Brendan Guillemin	7 August 1998 (age 28)	0	0	(French Guiana) Étoile de Matoury	v. Belize, 6 October 2026
DF	Jimmy Benice	18 July 1996 (age 30)	5	0	(French Guiana) Étoile de Matoury	v. Belize, 6 October 2026
DF	Larry Atia	10 March 2000 (age 26)	0	0	(French Guiana) Étoile de Matoury	v. Belize, 6 October 2026
DF	Mehdy François	1 August 2005 (age 21)	0	0	(French Guiana) Loyola	v. Belize, 6 October 2026

== Player records ==
As of 10 September 2024
Players in bold are still active with French Guiana.

=== Most appearances ===
Rank	Player	Caps	Goals	Career
1	Rhudy Evens	63	8	2008–2022
2	**Donovan Léon**	36	0	2014–present
3	**Miguel Haabo**	33	2	2012–present
4	Serge Lespérance	31	1	2008–2017
4	Marvin Torvic	31	1	2012–2019
6	**Jean-David Legrand**	30	2	2014–present
7	**Grégory Lescot**	29	0	2009–present
7	**Loïc Baal**	29	6	2015–present
7	**Albert Ajaiso**	28	1	2004–present
7	**Kévin Rimane**	28	2	2014–present
7	**Ludovic Baal**	28	3	2012–present

=== Top goalscorers ===
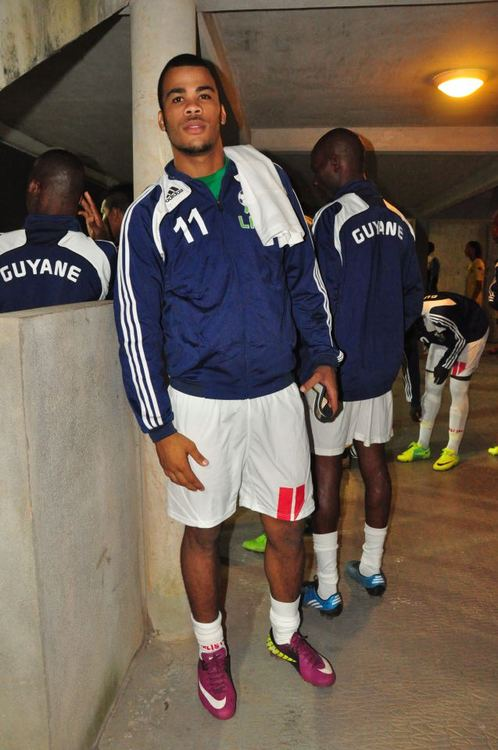
Gary Pigrée is French Guiana's top scorer with 16 goals.

Rank	Player	Goals	Caps	Ratio	Career
1	Gary Pigrée	16	20	0.8	2012–2015
2	**Joël Sarrucco**	9	17	0.53	2018–present
2	**Arnold Abelinti**	9	26	0.35	2016–present
4	Gabriel Pigrée	8	15	0.53	2007–2016
4	Rhudy Evens	8	63	0.13	2008–2022
6	**Sloan Privat**	7	11	0.64	2015–present
7	**Loïc Baal**	6	29	0.21	2015–present
8	**Jules Haabo**	5	14	0.36	2016–present
8	David Martinon	5	22	0.23	2004–2015

== Competitive record ==
=== CONCACAF Gold Cup ===
CONCACAF Championship & CONCACAF Gold Cup record									Qualification record					
Year	Result	Position	Pld	W	D	L	GF	GA	Pld	W	D	L	GF	GA
(El Salvador) 1963	Did not enter								Did not enter					
(Guatemala) 1965	Did not enter								Did not enter					
(Honduras) 1967	Did not enter								Did not enter					
(Costa Rica) 1969	Did not enter								Did not enter					
(Trinidad and Tobago) 1971	Did not enter								Did not enter					
(Haiti) 1973	Did not enter								Did not enter					
(Mexico) 1977	Did not enter								Did not enter					
(Honduras) 1981	Did not enter								Did not enter					
1985	Did not enter								Did not enter					
1989	Did not enter								Did not enter					
(United States) 1991	Did not qualify								2	1	0	1	2	2
(United States) 1993	Did not qualify								2	1	0	1	3	3
(United States) 1996	Did not qualify								9	2	2	5	16	16
(United States) 1998	Did not qualify								2	0	1	1	2	4
(United States) 2000	Did not qualify								3	0	1	2	3	5
(United States) 2002	Did not enter								Did not enter					
(Mexico) (United States) 2003	Did not enter								Did not enter					
(United States) 2005	Did not qualify								5	2	2	1	5	5
(United States) 2007	Did not enter								Did not enter					
(United States) 2009	Did not enter								Did not enter					
(United States) 2011	Did not enter								Did not enter					
(United States) 2013	Did not qualify								9	4	1	4	17	16
(Canada) (United States) 2015	Did not qualify								12	6	4	2	29	12
(United States) 2017	Group stage	12th	3	0	0	3	2	10	8	5	1	2	16	7
(Costa Rica) (Jamaica) (United States) 2019	Did not qualify								4	2	0	2	8	6
(United States) 2021	Did not qualify								2	1	1	0	4	1
(Canada) (United States) 2023	Did not qualify								8	4	3	1	13	10
(Canada) (United States) 2025	Did not qualify								6	0	2	4	7	11
Total	Group stage	1/28	3	0	0	3	2	10	72	28	18	26	125	98

=== CONCACAF Nations League ===
CONCACAF Nations League record
League										Finals								
Season	Division	Group	Pld	W	D	L	GF	GA	P/R	Finals	Result	Pld	W	D	L	GF	GA	Squad
2019–20	B	A	6	2	2	2	8	6	Same position	(United States) 2021	Ineligible							
2022–23	B	D	6	3	2	1	8	8	Same position	(United States) 2023	Ineligible							
2023–24	B	C	6	3	1	2	10	6	▲	(United States) 2024	Ineligible							
2024–25	A	B	4	0	1	3	4	7	▼	(United States) 2025	Did not qualify							
Total	—	—	22	8	6	8	30	27	—	Total	0 Titles	—	—	—	—	—	—	—

=== Caribbean Cup ===
CFU Championship & Caribbean Cup record									Qualification record					
Year	Round	Position	Pld	W	D	L	GF	GA	Pld	W	D*	L	GF	GA
(Trinidad and Tobago) 1978	Did not qualify								2	1	0	1	5	6
(Suriname) 1979	Did not enter								Did not enter					
(Puerto Rico) 1981	Did not qualify								3	1	0	2	4	5
(French Guiana) 1983	Third place	3rd	3	1	1	1	1	1	Qualified as host					
(Barbados) 1985	Did not qualify								2	0	0	2	0	2
(Martinique) 1988	Did not qualify								2	0	1	1	1	2
(Barbados) 1989	Did not qualify								4	1	0	3	5	7
(Trinidad and Tobago) 1990	Did not qualify								3	0	2	1	3	7
(Jamaica) 1991	Did not qualify								2	1	0	1	2	2
(Trinidad and Tobago) 1992	Did not qualify								3	1	1	1	5	4
(Jamaica) 1993	Did not qualify								2	1	0	1	3	3
(Trinidad and Tobago) 1994	Did not qualify								2	1	0	1	2	3
(Cayman Islands) (Jamaica) 1995	Group stage	7th	6	1	1	4	9	11	3	1	1	1	7	5
(Trinidad and Tobago) 1996	Did not qualify								2	0	1	1	2	3
(Antigua and Barbuda) (Saint Kitts and Nevis) 1997	Did not qualify								2	0	1	1	2	4
(Jamaica) (Trinidad and Tobago) 1998	Did not qualify								3	0	1	2	3	5
(Trinidad and Tobago) 1999	Withdrew								Withdrew					
(Trinidad and Tobago) 2001	Did not enter								Did not enter					
(Barbados) 2005	Did not qualify								5	2	2	1	5	5
(Trinidad and Tobago) 2007	Did not enter								Did not enter					
(Jamaica) 2008	Did not enter								Did not enter					
(Martinique) 2010	Did not enter								Did not enter					
(Antigua and Barbuda) 2012	Group stage	7th	3	1	0	2	4	6	6	3	1	2	13	10
(Jamaica) 2014	Group stage	5th	3	1	1	1	7	6	9	5	3	1	22	6
(Martinique) 2017	Third place	3rd	2	1	1	0	2	1	6	4	0	2	14	6
Total	Third place	5/25	17	5	4	8	23	25	61	22	14	25	98	85

== Head-to-head record ==
As of 29 September 2026 after match against Sint Maarten

Positive Record Neutral Record Negative Record

Opponent	Pld	W	D	L	GF	GA	GD
Anguilla	2	2	0	0	9	1	+8
Aruba	4	3	0	1	8	1	+7
Antigua and Barbuda	3	2	0	1	4	3	+1
Barbados	2	2	0	0	5	0	+5
Belize	8	2	2	4	6	10	-4
Bermuda	5	2	1	2	7	3	+4
British Virgin Islands	1	1	0	0	6	0	+6
Canada	2	0	0	2	3	8	−5
Cayman Islands	1	0	0	1	0	1	−1
Costa Rica	1	0	0	1	0	3	−3
Cuba	4	2	1	1	8	3	+5
Curaçao (Note: Includes matches against the Netherlands Antilles.)	4	2	1	1	9	4	+5
Dominica	2	1	1	0	5	1	+4
Dominican Republic	3	1	1	1	5	5	0
Grenada	4	0	3	1	2	3	−1
Guadeloupe	14	4	2	8	21	32	−11
Guatemala	2	1	0	1	2	4	−2
Guyana	12	4	3	5	16	19	−3
Haiti	5	2	2	1	10	7	+3
Honduras	4	1	1	2	5	7	−2
Jamaica	4	1	2	1	3	7	−4
Martinique	18	3	4	11	17	32	−15
Mayotte	2	1	1	0	6	4	+2
Nicaragua	2	0	0	2	2	4	−2
Puerto Rico	1	1	0	0	2	1	+1
Réunion	4	0	1	3	0	5	−5
Suriname	46	8	9	29	56	102	−46
Saint Kitts and Nevis	7	3	1	3	11	8	+3
Saint Pierre and Miquelon	2	2	0	0	18	1	+17
Sint Maarten	2	2	0	0	5	1	+4
Saint Vincent and the Grenadines	7	2	1	4	12	13	–1
Tahiti	1	1	0	0	2	1	+1
Trinidad and Tobago	8	1	1	6	10	20	−10
Turks and Caicos Islands	1	1	0	0	6	0	+6
Total	186	57	38	91	279	312	−33

== Honours ==
=== Regional ===
- CFU Championship / Caribbean Cup
  - (bronze) Third place (2): 1983, 2017
