= Saint Vincent and the Grenadines national football team results =

Here are the Saint Vincent and the Grenadines national football team fixtures and results.

== Fixtures ==
Date	(Saint Vincent and the Grenadines)	Opponents	Place

== Results ==
Saint Vincent and the Grenadines national football team results
Date	Venue	Opponent	Score	Competition	Saint Vincent and the Grenadines scorers
October 28, 1979	Martinique	Martinique	2–2	1979 CFU Championship	
November 2, 1979	(Saint Vincent and the Grenadines) St Vincent and the Grenadines	Martinique	1–0	1979 CFU Championship	
November 12, 1979	Suriname	Suriname	3–2	1979 CFU Championship	
November 14, 1979	Suriname	Haiti	1–2	1979 CFU Championship	
November 17, 1979	Suriname	Trinidad and Tobago	2–1	1979 CFU Championship	
September 13, 1981	(Saint Vincent and the Grenadines) St Vincent and the Grenadines	Suriname	2–1	1981 CFU Championship	
September 27, 1981	Suriname	Suriname	3–3	1981 CFU Championship	
October 19, 1981	Puerto Rico	Trinidad and Tobago	0–2	1981 CFU Championship	
October 21, 1981	Puerto Rico	Puerto Rico	2–0	1981 CFU Championship	
October 24, 1981	Puerto Rico	Guadeloupe	3–1	1981 CFU Championship	
February 20, 1983	(Saint Vincent and the Grenadines) St Vincent and the Grenadines	Martinique	1–3	1983 CFU Championship	
February 24, 1985	(Saint Vincent and the Grenadines) St Vincent and the Grenadines	Trinidad and Tobago	1–1	1985 CFU Championship	
March 20, 1985	(Saint Vincent and the Grenadines) St Vincent and the Grenadines	Grenada	2–1	1985 CFU Championship	
April 23, 1989	(Saint Vincent and the Grenadines) St Vincent and the Grenadines	Sint Maarten	9–0	1989 Caribbean Cup	
May 10, 1989	Martinique	Martinique	0–0	1989 Caribbean Cup	
May 21, 1989	Saint Vincent and the Grenadines	Netherlands Antilles	3–2	1989 Caribbean Cup	
June 19, 1989	Saint Vincent and the Grenadines	British Virgin Islands	2–0	1989 Caribbean Cup	
July 2, 1989	Barbados	Grenada	0–2	1989 Caribbean Cup	
July 4, 1989	Barbados	Netherlands Antilles	1–1	1989 Caribbean Cup	
April 22, 1990	Saint Vincent and the Grenadines	Dominica	2–1	1990 Caribbean Cup	
May 13, 1990	Saint Vincent and the Grenadines	Martinique	1–0	1990 Caribbean Cup	
May 23, 1990	French Guiana	French Guiana	2–2	1990 Caribbean Cup	
July 25, 1990	Trinidad and Tobago	Martinique	0–2	1990 Caribbean Cup	
July 27, 1990	Trinidad and Tobago	Barbados	2–3	1990 Caribbean Cup	
March 22, 1992	Saint Lucia	Saint Lucia	0–1	1994 FIFA World Cup Qualification	
March 29, 1992	Saint Vincent and the Grenadines	Saint Lucia	3–1	1994 FIFA World Cup Qualification	Joseph 33'; Jack 56'; Brown 66'
August 2, 1992	Suriname	Suriname	0–0	1994 FIFA World Cup Qualification	
August 30, 1992	Saint Vincent and the Grenadines	Suriname	2–1	1994 FIFA World Cup Qualification	Joseph 31'; Dupont 81'
November 8, 1992	Saint Vincent and the Grenadines	Mexico	0–4	1994 FIFA World Cup Qualification	
November 15, 1992	Saint Vincent and the Grenadines	Costa Rica	0–1	1994 FIFA World Cup Qualification	
November 22, 1992	Saint Vincent and the Grenadines	Honduras	0–4	1994 FIFA World Cup Qualification	
November 28, 1992	Honduras	Honduras	0–4	1994 FIFA World Cup Qualification	
December 6, 1992	Mexico	Mexico	0–11	1994 FIFA World Cup Qualification	
December 13, 1992	Costa Rica	Costa Rica	0–5	1994 FIFA World Cup Qualification	
January 11, 1996	United States	Mexico	0–5	1996 CONCACAF Gold Cup	
January 16, 1996	United States	Guatemala	0–3	1996 CONCACAF Gold Cup	
May 4, 1996	Puerto Rico	Puerto Rico	1–2	1998 FIFA World Cup qualification	Huggins 18'; Hinds 58'
May 12, 1996	Saint Vincent and the Grenadines	Puerto Rico	7–0	1998 FIFA World Cup qualification	Jack 3', 13', 25'; Mussenden 35' (o.g.); Hinds 37', 59'; Charles 64'
June 23, 1996	Saint Kitts and Nevis	Saint Kitts and Nevis	2–2	1998 FIFA World Cup qualification	Andre Hinds 12'; Kendall Velox 35'
June 30, 1996	Saint Vincent and the Grenadines	Saint Kitts and Nevis	0–0	1998 FIFA World Cup qualification	
September 15, 1996	Saint Vincent and the Grenadines	Mexico	0–3	1998 FIFA World Cup qualification	
September 23, 1996	Saint Vincent and the Grenadines	Jamaica	1–2	1998 FIFA World Cup qualification	Harry 82'
October 13, 1996	Saint Vincent and the Grenadines	Honduras	1–4	1998 FIFA World Cup qualification	Chewitt 62'
October 30, 1996	Mexico	Mexico	1–5	1998 FIFA World Cup qualification	Velox 88'
November 10, 1996	Jamaica	Jamaica	0–5	1998 FIFA World Cup qualification	
November 17, 1996	Honduras	Honduras	3–11	1998 FIFA World Cup qualification	Jack 37'; Guy 62'; Sam 75'
March 5, 2000	Saint Vincent and the Grenadines	(United States Virgin Islands) U.S. Virgin Islands	9–0	2002 FIFA World Cup qualification	Jack 6', 15', 48', Guy 18', 20', 31'; Chewitt 74', 86'; Gonsalves 81'
March 19, 2000	(United States Virgin Islands) U.S. Virgin Islands	(United States Virgin Islands) U.S. Virgin Islands	5–1	2002 FIFA World Cup qualification	Gonsalves 7'; Chewitt 15', 35', 51', 89'
May 7, 2000	Antigua and Barbuda	Antigua and Barbuda	1–2	2002 FIFA World Cup qualification	Skeal 68' (o.g.)
May 21, 2000	Saint Vincent and the Grenadines	Antigua and Barbuda	4–0	2002 FIFA World Cup qualification	John 11'; Charles 50'; Guy 56', 61'
July 9, 2000	Costa Rica	Costa Rica	1–7	Friendly	Velox 72'
July 16, 2000	Saint Vincent and the Grenadines	Jamaica	0–1	2002 FIFA World Cup qualification	
July 23, 2000	El Salvador	El Salvador	1–7	2002 FIFA World Cup qualification	Ballantyne 9'
August 16, 2000	Honduras	Honduras	0–6	2002 FIFA World Cup qualification	
September 3, 2000	Jamaica	Jamaica	0–2	2002 FIFA World Cup qualification	
October 8, 2000	Saint Vincent and the Grenadines	El Salvador	1–2	2002 FIFA World Cup qualification	James 79'
November 14, 2000	Saint Vincent and the Grenadines	Honduras	0–7	2002 FIFA World Cup qualification	
April 4, 2001	Martinique	Martinique	0–3	2001 Caribbean Cup	
April 6, 2001	Martinique	Cayman Islands	1–1	2001 Caribbean Cup	Nero 29'
April 8, 2001	Martinique	British Virgin Islands	6–0	2001 Caribbean Cup	Guy 46', 55', 80', 84'; Haynes 75', 87'
June 13, 2004	Nicaragua	Nicaragua	2–2	2006 FIFA World Cup qualification	Haynes 9'; Samuel 43'
June 20, 2004	(Saint Vincent and the Grenadines) St Vincent and the Grenadines	Nicaragua	4–1	2006 FIFA World Cup qualification	Samuel 14', 79'; James 15'; Alonso 86' (o.g.)
August 18, 2004	(Saint Vincent and the Grenadines) St Vincent and the Grenadines	Nicaragua	0–2	2006 FIFA World Cup qualification	
September 10, 2004	(Saint Vincent and the Grenadines) St Vincent and the Grenadines	Saint Kitts and Nevis	1–0	2006 FIFA World Cup qualification	Jack 23'
October 6, 2004	Mexico	Mexico	0–7	2006 FIFA World Cup qualification	
October 10, 2004	(Saint Vincent and the Grenadines) St Vincent and the Grenadines	Mexico	0–1	2006 FIFA World Cup qualification	
October 13, 2004	Saint Kitts and Nevis	Saint Kitts and Nevis	3–0	2006 FIFA World Cup qualification	Velox 19', 85'; Samuel 65'
October 6, 2004	Trinidad and Tobago	Trinidad and Tobago	1–2	2006 FIFA World Cup qualification	Haynes 49'
November 24, 2004	Saint Vincent and the Grenadines	British Virgin Islands	1–1	2005 Caribbean Cup qualification	Haynes 53'
November 26, 2004	Saint Vincent and the Grenadines	Bermuda	3–3	2005 Caribbean Cup qualification	Pierre 7'; Haynes 52'; Samuel 54'
November 28, 2004	Saint Vincent and the Grenadines	Cayman Islands	4–0	2005 Caribbean Cup qualification	Samuel 20', 51'; Forde 43' (pen.); Gonsalves 80'
December 12, 2004	Saint Vincent and the Grenadines	Grenada	3–1	2005 Caribbean Cup qualification	Samuel 10'; Guy 22'; Velox 60'
December 19, 2004	Grenada	Grenada	0–1	2005 Caribbean Cup qualification	
January 9, 2005	Trinidad and Tobago	Trinidad and Tobago	1–3	2005 Caribbean Cup qualification	Haynes 24'
January 16, 2005	Saint Vincent and the Grenadines	Trinidad and Tobago	1–0	2005 Caribbean Cup qualification	Forde 65' (pen.)
September 7, 2006	Jamaica	Haiti	0–4	2007 Caribbean Cup	
September 29, 2006	Jamaica	Jamaica	2–1	2007 Caribbean Cup	John 49'; Velox 70'
October 1, 2006	Jamaica	Saint Lucia	8–0	2007 Caribbean Cup	Douglas 11'; Samuel 25', 42', 56', 76', 90+3'; John 52'; Haynes 84'
November 19, 2006	Barbados	Bermuda	3–0	2007 Caribbean Cup	M. James 58'; Samuel 68', 77'
November 21, 2006	Barbados	Barbados	0–3	2007 Caribbean Cup	
November 21, 2006	Barbados	The Bahamas	3–2	2007 Caribbean Cup	Samuel 56', 61'; Charles 80'
January 14, 2007	Trinidad and Tobago	Guyana	2–0	2007 Caribbean Cup	Samuel 4'; Glynn 86'
January 16, 2007	Trinidad and Tobago	Cuba	0–3	2007 Caribbean Cup	
January 18, 2007	Trinidad and Tobago	Guadeloupe	0–1	2007 Caribbean Cup	
January 13, 2008	(Saint Vincent and the Grenadines) St Vincent and the Grenadines	Trinidad and Tobago	0–1	Friendly	
January 27, 2008	Guyana	Guyana	2–2	Friendly	
February 10, 2008	(Saint Vincent and the Grenadines) St Vincent and the Grenadines	Grenada	1–2	Friendly	
February 29, 2008	Guadeloupe	Guadeloupe	2–1	Friendly	
March 13, 2008	(Saint Vincent and the Grenadines) St Vincent and the Grenadines	Barbados	0–2	Friendly	
June 3, 2008	Jamaica	Jamaica	1–5	Friendly	
June 15, 2008	(Saint Vincent and the Grenadines) St Vincent and the Grenadines	Canada	0–3	2010 FIFA World Cup Qualification	
June 20, 2008	Canada	Canada	1–4	2010 FIFA World Cup Qualification	James 76'
October 6, 2010	(Saint Vincent and the Grenadines) St Vincent and the Grenadines	Montserrat	7–0	2010 Caribbean Cup qualification	S. Samuel 26' (pen.), 27', 67'; Francis 56'; Stewart 64'; Balcombe 70'; Snagg 89'
October 8, 2010	(Saint Vincent and the Grenadines) St Vincent and the Grenadines	Saint Kitts and Nevis	1–1	2010 Caribbean Cup qualification	James 73'
October 10, 2010	(Saint Vincent and the Grenadines) St Vincent and the Grenadines	Barbados	0–0	2010 Caribbean Cup qualification	
November 2, 2010	Trinidad and Tobago	Trinidad and Tobago	2–6	2010 Caribbean Cup qualification	S. Samuel 21'; Stewart 43'
November 4, 2010	Trinidad and Tobago	Haiti	1–3	2010 Caribbean Cup qualification	S. Samuel 64'
November 6, 2010	Trinidad and Tobago	Guyana	0–2	2010 Caribbean Cup qualification	
September 2, 2011	Guatemala	Guatemala	0–4	2014 FIFA World Cup Qualification	
September 16, 2011	(Saint Vincent and the Grenadines) St Vincent and the Grenadines	Grenada	2–1	2014 FIFA World Cup Qualification	M. Samuel 22'; Stewart 72'
October 7, 2011	(Saint Vincent and the Grenadines) St Vincent and the Grenadines	Guatemala	0–3	2014 FIFA World Cup Qualification	
October 11, 2011	Grenada	Grenada	1–1	2014 FIFA World Cup Qualification	M. Samuel 62'
November 11, 2011	Belize	Belize	1–1	2014 FIFA World Cup Qualification	Stewart 11'
November 15, 2011	(Saint Vincent and the Grenadines) St Vincent and the Grenadines	Belize	0–2	2014 FIFA World Cup Qualification	
October 21, 2012	Saint Lucia	Guyana	2–1	2012 Caribbean Cup qualification	M. Samuel 30'; Stewart 79'
October 23, 2012	Saint Lucia	Saint Lucia	0–1	2012 Caribbean Cup qualification	
October 25, 2012	Saint Lucia	Curaçao	4–0	2012 Caribbean Cup qualification	Stewart 8', 76'; Hamlett 58'; M. Samuel 78'
November 14, 2012	Trinidad and Tobago	Trinidad and Tobago	1–1	2012 Caribbean Cup qualification	Stewart 8'
November 16, 2012	Trinidad and Tobago	Cuba	1–1	2012 Caribbean Cup qualification	M. Samuel 24'
November 16, 2012	Trinidad and Tobago	Suriname	0–1	2012 Caribbean Cup qualification	
September 3, 2014	Antigua and Barbuda	Dominican Republic	1–0	2014 Caribbean Cup qualification	Anderson 45+1'
September 5, 2014	Antigua and Barbuda	Anguilla	4–0	2014 Caribbean Cup qualification	Samuel 36' (pen.); Anderson 39', 77'; Solomon 71'
September 7, 2014	Antigua and Barbuda	Antigua and Barbuda	1–2	2014 Caribbean Cup qualification	McBurnette 45+1'
October 8, 2014	Guadeloupe	Guadeloupe	1–3	2014 Caribbean Cup qualification	Samuel 46'
October 10, 2014	Guadeloupe	Curaçao	1–0	2014 Caribbean Cup qualification	Anderson 4'
October 12, 2014	Guadeloupe	Martinique	3–4	2014 Caribbean Cup qualification	Stewart 27', 60'; Anderson 66'
June 10, 2015	(Saint Vincent and the Grenadines) St Vincent and the Grenadines	Guyana	2–2	2018 FIFA World Cup Qualification	Stewart 51'; Slater 84'
June 14, 2015	Guyana	Guyana	4–4	2018 FIFA World Cup Qualification	Samuel 16'; Slater 41', 58'; Anderson 67'
September 4, 2015	(Saint Vincent and the Grenadines) St Vincent and the Grenadines	Aruba	2–0	2018 FIFA World Cup Qualification	Slater 51'; Anderson 90' (pen.)
September 8, 2015	Aruba	Aruba	1–2	2018 FIFA World Cup Qualification	Slater 84'
November 13, 2015	United States	(United States) USA	1–6	2018 FIFA World Cup Qualification	Anderson 5'
November 17, 2015	(Saint Vincent and the Grenadines) St Vincent and the Grenadines	Guatemala	0–4	2018 FIFA World Cup Qualification	
March 25, 2015	(Saint Vincent and the Grenadines) St Vincent and the Grenadines	Trinidad and Tobago	2–3	2018 FIFA World Cup Qualification	M. Samuel 45' (pen.); S. Samuel 77'
March 29, 2015	Trinidad and Tobago	Trinidad and Tobago	0–6	2018 FIFA World Cup Qualification	
September 29, 2015	(Saint Vincent and the Grenadines) St Vincent and the Grenadines	(United States) USA	0–6	2018 FIFA World Cup Qualification	
September 6, 2015	Guatemala	Guatemala	3–9	2018 FIFA World Cup Qualification	Anderson 10', 29'; McBurnette 90'
June 4, 2016	Suriname	Suriname	1–2	2017 Caribbean Cup qualification	Samuel 71'
June 7, 2016	(Saint Vincent and the Grenadines) St Vincent and the Grenadines	Saint Kitts and Nevis	0–1	2017 Caribbean Cup qualification	
September 8, 2018	(Saint Vincent and the Grenadines) St Vincent and the Grenadines	Nicaragua	0–2	CONCACAF Nations League qualifying	
October 11, 2018	French Guiana	French Guiana	1–0	CONCACAF Nations League qualifying	Solomon 60' (pen.)
November 18, 2018	Turks and Caicos Islands	Turks and Caicos Islands	2–3	CONCACAF Nations League qualifying	Sutherland 86'; McBurnette 88'
March 21, 2019	(Saint Vincent and the Grenadines) St Vincent and the Grenadines	Bonaire	2–1	CONCACAF Nations League qualifying	Windster 77' (o.g.); Cunningham 79'
August 11, 2019	(Saint Vincent and the Grenadines) St Vincent and the Grenadines	Trinidad and Tobago	1–0	Friendly	Cunningham 4'
August 31, 2019	Belize	Belize	1–1	Friendly	
September 2, 2019	Belize	Belize	0–1	Friendly	
September 5, 2019	Nicaragua	Nicaragua	1–1	Nations League B	Anderson 45+2'
September 8, 2019	(Saint Vincent and the Grenadines) St Vincent and the Grenadines	Dominica	1–0	Nations League B	Cunnigham 45+2'
October 11, 2019	(Saint Vincent and the Grenadines) St Vincent and the Grenadines	Suriname	2–2	Nations League B	Stewart 58', 90+5' (pen.)
October 14, 2019	Suriname	Suriname	1–0	Nations League B	Stewart 68'
November 15, 2019	(Saint Vincent and the Grenadines) St Vincent and the Grenadines	Nicaragua	1–0	Nations League B	Sutherland 60'
November 15, 2019	Dominica	Dominica	0–1	Nations League B	
March 25, 2021	Curaçao	Curaçao	0–5	2022 FIFA World Cup Qualification	
March 30, 2021	Curaçao	British Virgin Islands	3–0	2022 FIFA World Cup Qualification	Anderson 10'; Sam 20'; Solomon 86'
June 4, 2021	Guatemala	Guatemala	0–10	2022 FIFA World Cup Qualification	
June 8, 2021	Grenada	Cuba	0–1	2022 FIFA World Cup Qualification	
July 2, 2021	United States	Haiti	1–6	2021 CONCACAF Gold Cup qualification	Edwards 42'
May 12, 2022	Dominica	Dominica	1–2	Friendly	M. Stewart 3'
May 15, 2022	Dominica	Dominica	1–3	Friendly	Thomas 45+1'
June 3, 2022	(The Bahamas) Bahamas	(The Bahamas) Bahamas	0–1	2022–23 CONCACAF Nations League	
June 6, 2022	Saint Vincent and the Grenadines	Nicaragua	2–2	2022–23 CONCACAF Nations League	Solomon 3'; Anderson 45+5'
June 10, 2022	Saint Vincent and the Grenadines	Trinidad and Tobago	0–2	2022–23 CONCACAF Nations League	
June 13, 2022	Trinidad and Tobago	Trinidad and Tobago	1–4	2022–23 CONCACAF Nations League	C. Stewart 26'
September 24, 2022	Grenada	Grenada	3–1	Friendly	Stewart 24' (pen.), 31'; Cunningham 68'
October 1, 2022	Saint Vincent and the Grenadines	Grenada	1–5	Friendly	Thomas 15'
