= 1981 CFU Championship =

Tournament details
- Host country: Puerto Rico
- Dates: 19–25 October 1981
- Teams: 4

Final positions
- Champions: Trinidad and Tobago (1st title)
- Runners-up: Saint Vincent and the Grenadines
- Third place: Guadeloupe
- Fourth place: Puerto Rico

Tournament statistics
- Matches played: 6
- Goals scored: 18 (3 per match)

The 1981 CFU Championship was the third international association football championship for members of the Caribbean Football Union (CFU). Hosted by Puerto Rico, the competition ran from 19–25 October 1981 and was contested by the national teams of Guadeloupe, Puerto Rico, St Vincent and the Grenadines and Trinidad and Tobago.

Trinidad and Tobago won the competition for the first time after defeating hosts Puerto Rico 6–0 in final match of the round-robin tournament.

== Background ==
The Caribbean Football Union (CFU) was founded in January 1978 as a sub-confederation of the Confederation of North, Central America and Caribbean Association Football (CONCACAF). Later the same year, the first CFU Championship was organised in Trinidad and Tobago.

Haiti were the defending champions after winning the previous edition in Suriname. Haiti and Suriname were the joint-most successful teams in the history of the competition with one title each.

== Format ==
Four qualifying rounds were held to determine three of the four teams that would participate in the final tournament. Hosts Puerto Rico qualified automatically. In the first round, the 10 teams were drawn into five two-legged ties. The team scoring more goals on aggregate in each tie would advance to the next stage. In the second round, two of the remaining five teams were drawn into a two-legged tie. The team scoring more goals on aggregate, along with the three other teams, would advance to the next stage.

In the semi-final round, the remaining four teams were drawn into two two-legged ties. The team scoring more goals on aggregate in each tie would qualify for the final tournament. A two-legged play-off round was then held between the two losing teams from the semi-final round. The team scoring more goals on aggregate would qualify for the final tournament.

The final tournament was played as a single round-robin where each team would play all of the others once. The winner would be decided by the total number of points obtained across all matches played.

=== Participants ===
- Barbados
- Dominica
- French Guiana
- Guadeloupe
- Jamaica
- Martinique
- Puerto Rico
- Saint Lucia
- Trinidad and Tobago
- Saint Vincent and the Grenadines
- Suriname

== Qualifying tournament ==
The qualification stage ran from June to September 1981.

=== First round ===
In the first round, Trinidad and Tobago defeated Jamaica 4–2 on aggregate, Guadeloupe defeated Dominica 8–2 on aggregate and St Vincent and the Grenadines defeated Martinique 4–2 on aggregate. Suriname and French Guyana drew 4–4 on aggregate and Suriname won a play-off 1–0. St Lucia withdrew and Barados received a walkover to the second round.

First round
Team 1	Agg.	Team 2	1st leg	2nd leg	Play-off
Barbados	w/o (Note: St Lucia withdrew.)	Saint Lucia	—	—	
Jamaica	2–4	Trinidad and Tobago	2–0	0–4	
Guadeloupe	8–2	Dominica	5–0	3–2	
Suriname	4–4	French Guiana	3–1	1–3	1–0
Saint Vincent and the Grenadines	4–2	Martinique	2–1	2–1	

==== Results ====
Barbados	Cancelled	Saint Lucia

Saint Lucia	Cancelled	Barbados

St Lucia withdrew, Barbados advanced.

7 June 1981

Jamaica	2–0	Trinidad and Tobago
Hyde; Russell

National Stadium, Kingston, Jamaica
19 June 1981

Trinidad and Tobago	4–0	Jamaica

Queen's Park Oval, Port of Spain

Trinidad and Tobago won 4–2 on aggregate.

21 June 1981

Guadeloupe	5–0	Dominica

Stade de Les Abymes, Les Abymes
5 July 1981

Dominica	2–3	Guadeloupe

Windsor Park, Roseau

Guadeloupe won 8–2 on aggregate.

7 June 1981

Suriname	3–1	French Guiana

National Stadion, Paramaribo
21 June 1981

French Guiana	3–1	Suriname

Stade de Baduel, Cayenne

4–4 on aggregate.

5 July 1981

Saint Vincent and the Grenadines	2–1	Martinique

Arnos Vale Stadium, Arnos Vale
19 July 1981

Martinique	1–2	Saint Vincent and the Grenadines

Stade Louis Achille, Fort-de-France

St Vincent and the Grenadines won 4–2 on aggregate.

==== Play-off ====
19 July 1981

Suriname	1–0	French Guiana

National Stadion, Paramaribo

=== Second round ===
In the second round, Trinidad and Tobago and Barbados drew 2–2 on aggregate and Trinidad and Tobago won 4–2 on penalties.

Second round
Team 1	Agg.	Team 2	1st leg	2nd leg
Trinidad and Tobago	2–2 (4–2 p)	Barbados	1–1	1–1

==== Results ====
5 July 1981

Barbados	1–1	Trinidad and Tobago

National Stadium, Bridgetown
17 July 1981

Trinidad and Tobago	1–1	Barbados
Penalties
	4–2

Skinner Park, San Fernando

2–2 on aggregate. Trinidad and Tobago won 4–2 on penalties.

=== Semi-final round ===
In the semi-final round, Trinidad and Tobago defeated Suriname 4–3 on aggregate and Guadeloupe defeated St Vincent and the Grenadines 4–2 on aggregate to qualify for the final tournament.

Semi-final round
Team 1	Agg.	Team 2	1st leg	2nd leg
Suriname	3–4	Trinidad and Tobago	1–1	2–3
Guadeloupe	4–3	Saint Vincent and the Grenadines	3–0	1–3

==== Results ====
8 August 1981

Suriname	1–1	Trinidad and Tobago

National Stadion, Paramaribo
15 August 1981

Trinidad and Tobago	3–2	Suriname

Queen's Park Oval, Port of Spain

Trinidad and Tobago won 4–3 on aggregate.

2 August 1981

Guadeloupe	3–0	Saint Vincent and the Grenadines

Arnos Vale Stadium, Arnos Vale
16 August 1981

Saint Vincent and the Grenadines	3–1	Guadeloupe

Stade de Les Abymes, Les Abymes

Guadeloupe won 4–3 on aggregate.

=== Play-off ===
In the play-off, St Vincent and the Grenadines defeated Suriname 5–4 on aggregate to qualify for the final tournament.

Play-off
Team 1	Agg.	Team 2	1st leg	2nd leg
Saint Vincent and the Grenadines	5–4	Suriname	2–1	3–3

==== Results ====
13 September 1981

Saint Vincent and the Grenadines	2–1	Suriname

Arnos Vale Stadium, Arnos Vale
27 September 1981

Suriname	3–3	Saint Vincent and the Grenadines

National Stadion, Paramaribo

St Vincent and the Grenadines won 5–4 on aggregate.

== Final tournament ==
The final tournament was held from 19–25 October 1981. After winning their opening two matches, Trinidad and Tobago were crowned champions when they defeated Puerto Rico 6–0 in their final match.

=== Table ===
Pos	Team	Pld	W	D	L	GF	GA	GD	Pts
1	Trinidad and Tobago	3	3	0	0	10	0	+10	6
2	Saint Vincent and the Grenadines	3	2	0	1	5	3	+2	4
3	Guadeloupe	3	0	1	2	2	6	−4	1
4	Puerto Rico	3	0	1	2	1	9	−8	1

=== Results ===
19 October 1981

Puerto Rico	1–1	Guadeloupe
Rivera 58'		Beauzor 70'

Estadio Sixto Escobar, San Juan
19 October 1981

Trinidad and Tobago	2–0	Saint Vincent and the Grenadines
Eddy; Skinner

Estadio Sixto Escobar, San Juan

21 October 1981

Puerto Rico	0–2	Saint Vincent and the Grenadines
		Lewe 68'; Millington 87'

Estadio Sixto Escobar, San Juan
21 October 1981

Trinidad and Tobago	2–0	Guadeloupe
Skinner 25'; Eddy 79'

Estadio Sixto Escobar, San Juan

24 October 1981

Saint Vincent and the Grenadines	3–1	Guadeloupe

Estadio Sixto Escobar, San Juan
25 October 1981

Trinidad and Tobago	6–0	Puerto Rico
Craig 16'; Skinner (x2); Corneal 47'; Mendes (x2)

Estadio Sixto Escobar, San Juan
