= 1979 CFU Championship =

Tournament details
- Host country: Suriname
- Dates: 11–18 November 1979
- Teams: 4

Final positions
- Champions: Haiti (1st title)
- Runners-up: Saint Vincent and the Grenadines
- Third place: Suriname
- Fourth place: Trinidad and Tobago

Tournament statistics
- Matches played: 6
- Goals scored: 17 (2.83 per match)

The 1979 CFU Championship was the second international association football championship for members of the Caribbean Football Union (CFU). Hosted by Suriname, the competition ran from 11–18 November 1979 and was contested by the national teams of Haiti, St Vincent and the Grenadines, Suriname and Trinidad and Tobago.

Haiti won the competition for the first time after defeating defending champions Suriname 1–0 in final match of the round-robin tournament.

== Background ==
The Caribbean Football Union (CFU) was founded in January 1978 as a sub-confederation of the Confederation of North, Central America and Caribbean Association Football (CONCACAF). Later the same year, the first CFU Championship was organised in Trinidad and Tobago.

Suriname were the defending champions after winning the inaugural edition.

== Format ==
Three qualifying rounds were held to determine three of the four teams that would participate in the final tournament. Hosts Suriname qualified automatically. Participating teams were drawn into three sections. Within each section, three rounds of knockout ties would take place in which teams were drawn into two-legged ties. The team scoring more goals on aggregate in each tie would advance to the next stage.

The final tournament was played as a single round-robin where each team would play all of the others once. The winner would be decided by the total number of points obtained across all matches played.

=== Participants ===
- Antigua and Barbuda
- Cuba
- Dominica
- French Guiana
- Grenada
- Guadeloupe
- Guyana
- Haiti
- Jamaica
- Martinique
- Netherlands Antilles
- Puerto Rico
- Saint Kitts and Nevis
- Saint Lucia
- Saint Vincent and the Grenadines
- Suriname
- Trinidad and Tobago

== Qualification ==
The qualification stage ran from June to November 1979. Some match results are unknown. It is also unclear whether Guadeloupe and St Vincent and the Grenadines received a bye in the first round or if they contested an unknown tie.

=== Group 1 ===
In the first round, Grenada and Trinidad and Tobago received a bye. The Netherlands Antilles and St Lucia withdrew and Guyana and French Guiana received a walkover to the second round. In the second round, Trinidad and Tobago defeated Grenada 3–1 on aggregate. Guyana withdrew and French Guiana received a walkover to the third round. Trinidad and Tobago defeated Guadeloupe 2–0 on aggregate in the third round to qualify for the final tournament.

Group 1
Team 1	Agg.	Team 2	1st leg	2nd leg
First round
Guyana	w/o (Note: Netherlands Antilles withdrew.)	Netherlands Antilles	—	—
French Guiana	w/o (Note: St Lucia withdrew.)	Saint Lucia	—	—
Grenada	Bye	n/a	—	—
Trinidad and Tobago	Bye	n/a	—	—
Second round
Grenada	1–3	Trinidad and Tobago	0–1	1–2
French Guiana	w/o (Note: Guyana withdrew.)	Guyana	—	—
Third round
Trinidad and Tobago	2–0	French Guiana	2–0 (Note: Both matches played in Cayenne, French Guiana.)	0–0

==== First round ====
Guyana	Cancelled	Netherlands Antilles

Netherlands Antilles	Cancelled	Guyana

Netherlands Antilles withdrew, Guyana advanced.

French Guiana	Cancelled	Saint Lucia

Saint Lucia	Cancelled	French Guiana

St Lucia withdrew, French Guiana advanced.

==== Second round ====
22 July 1979

Grenada	0–1	Trinidad and Tobago

Queen's Park, St. George's
4 August 1979

Trinidad and Tobago	2–1	Grenada

Skinner Park, San Fernando

Trinidad and Tobago won 3–1 on aggregate.

French Guiana	Cancelled	Guyana

Guyana	Cancelled	French Guiana

Guyana withdrew, French Guiana advanced.

==== Third round ====
4 October 1979

Trinidad and Tobago	2–0	French Guiana

Stade de Baduel, Cayenne
6 October 1979

French Guiana	0–0	Trinidad and Tobago

Stade de Baduel, Cayenne

Trinidad and Tobago won 2–0 on aggregate.

=== Group 2 ===
In the first round, Antigua and Barbuda, Haiti and Puerto Rico received a bye. Jamaica defeated St Kitts and Nevis 4–2 on aggregate. In the second round, Puerto Rico withdrew and Jamaica received a walkover to the third round. Haiti defeated Antigua and Barbuda 3–1 on aggregate. Haiti defeated Jamaica 7–0 on aggregate in the third round to qualify for the final tournament.

Group 2
Team 1	Agg.	Team 2	1st leg	2nd leg
First round
Jamaica	4–2	Saint Kitts and Nevis	2–1	2–1
Antigua and Barbuda	Bye	n/a	—	—
Haiti	Bye	n/a	—	—
Puerto Rico	Bye	n/a	—	—
Second round
Haiti	3–1	Antigua and Barbuda	1–0	2–1
Puerto Rico	w/o (Note: Puerto Rico withdrew.)	Jamaica	—	—
Third round
Haiti	7–0	Jamaica	3–0	4–0

==== First round ====
3 June 1979

Jamaica	2–1	Saint Kitts and Nevis
Bell 58'; Welch 88'		Tyson

National Stadium, Kingston
17 June 1979

Saint Kitts and Nevis	1–2	Jamaica
Goal		Donaldson; Andrews

Warner Park, Basseterre

Jamaica won 4–2 on aggregate.

==== Second round ====
29 September 1979

Haiti	1–0	Antigua and Barbuda

Stade Sylvio Cator, Port-au-Prince
15 October 1979

Antigua and Barbuda	1–2	Haiti

Antigua Recreation Ground, St. John's

Haiti won 3–1 on aggregate.

Puerto Rico	Cancelled	Jamaica

Jamaica	Cancelled	Puerto Rico

Puerto Rico withdrew, Jamaica advanced.

==== Third round ====
28 October 1979

Haiti	3–0	Jamaica
Mathelier 8'; Bobo 21'; Velima 36'	Report

Stade Sylvio Cator, Port-au-Prince
2 November 1979

Jamaica	0–4	Haiti

National Stadium, Kingston

Haiti won 7–0 on aggregate.

=== Group 3 ===
In the first round, Martinique received a bye. Dominica withdrew and Cuba received a walkover to the second round. In the second round, St Vincent and the Grenadines defeated Martinique 3–2 on aggregate. The results of the Cuba v Guadeloupe tie are unknown but Guadeloupe advanced to the third round. St Vincent and the Grenadines defeated Guadeloupe 4–1 on aggregate in the third round to qualify for the final tournament.

Group 3
Team 1	Agg.	Team 2	1st leg	2nd leg
First round
Dominica	w/o	Cuba	—	—
Martinique	Bye	n/a	—	—
Second round
Saint Vincent and the Grenadines	3–2	Martinique	2–2	1–0
Cuba	unknown (Note: The results of the Cuba v Guadeloupe tie are unknown. Guadeloupe advanced.)	Guadeloupe	—	—
Third round
Saint Vincent and the Grenadines	4–1	Guadeloupe	1–1	3–1

==== First round ====
Dominica	Cancelled	Cuba

Cuba	Cancelled	Dominica

Dominica withdrew, Cuba advanced.

==== Second round ====
17 June 1979

Saint Vincent and the Grenadines	2–2	Martinique

Arnos Vale Stadium, Arnos Vale
8 July 1979

Martinique	0–1	Saint Vincent and the Grenadines

Stade Louis Achille, Fort-de-France

St Vincent and the Grenadines won 3–2 on aggregate.

Guadeloupe	Unknown	Cuba

Cuba	Unknown	Guadeloupe

Results unknown, Guadeloupe advanced.

==== Third round ====
30 September 1979

Saint Vincent and the Grenadines	1–1	Guadeloupe

Arnos Vale Stadium, Arnos Vale
14 October 1979

Guadeloupe	1–3	Saint Vincent and the Grenadines

Stade de Les Abymes, Les Abymes

St Vincent and the Grenadines won 4–2 on aggregate.

== Final tournament ==
The final tournament was held from 11–18 November 1979. After winning their opening two matches, Haiti were crowned champions when they defeated Suriname 1–0 in their final match.

=== Table ===
Pos	Team	Pld	W	D	L	GF	GA	GD	Pts
1	Haiti	3	3	0	0	4	1	+3	6
2	Saint Vincent and the Grenadines	3	2	0	1	6	5	+1	4
3	Suriname	3	1	0	2	5	4	+1	2
4	Trinidad and Tobago	3	0	0	3	1	6	−5	0

=== Results ===
11 November 1979

Haiti	1–0	Trinidad and Tobago

National Stadion, Paramaribo
12 November 1979

Suriname	2–3	Saint Vincent and the Grenadines

National Stadion, Paramaribo

14 November 1979

Haiti	2–1	Saint Vincent and the Grenadines

National Stadion, Paramaribo
15 November 1979

Suriname	3–0	Trinidad and Tobago

National Stadion, Paramaribo

17 November 1979

Saint Vincent and the Grenadines	2–1	Trinidad and Tobago

National Stadion, Paramaribo
18 November 1979

Haiti	1–0	Suriname

National Stadion, Paramaribo
