= 1985 CFU Championship =

Tournament details
- Host country: Barbados
- Dates: 25–29 June 1985
- Teams: 4

Final positions
- Champions: Martinique
- Runners-up: Barbados
- Third place: Guadeloupe
- Fourth place: Suriname

Tournament statistics
- Matches played: 6
- Goals scored: 13 (2.17 per match)

The 1985 CFU Championship was the fifth international association football championship for members of the Caribbean Football Union (CFU). Hosted by Barbados, the competition ran from 25–29 June 1985 and was contested by the national teams of Barbados, Guadeloupe, Martinique and Suriname.

Defending champions Martinique became the first team to successfully defend the title as they won the competition for the second time after a 1–1 draw with hosts Barbados in the final round of matches of the round-robin tournament.

== Background ==
The Caribbean Football Union (CFU) was founded in January 1978 as a sub-confederation of the Confederation of North, Central America and Caribbean Association Football (CONCACAF). Later the same year, the first CFU Championship was organised in Trinidad and Tobago.

Martinique were the defending champions after winning the previous edition in French Guiana. Four different teams had won the four previous tournaments - Haiti, Martinique, Suriname and Trinidad and Tobago.

== Format ==
Two qualifying rounds were held to determine two of the four teams that would participate in the final tournament. Hosts Barbados and holders Martinique qualified automatically. In the first round, teams were drawn into groups of three or four teams. Each group was played as a single round-robin where each team would play all of the others once. The winner of each group, decided by the total number of points obtained across all matches played, would advance to the next stage.

In the second round, the three remaining teams would contest a single round-robin where each team would play all of the others once. The winner and runner-up of the group, decided by the total number of points obtained across all matches played, would qualify for the final tournament.

The final tournament was played as a single round-robin where each team would play all of the others once. The winner would be decided by the total number of points obtained across all matches played.

=== Participants ===
- Antigua and Barbuda
- Barbados
- Cayman Islands
- Dominica
- French Guiana
- Grenada
- Guadeloupe
- Guyana
- Martinique
- Saint Lucia
- Saint Vincent and the Grenadines
- Suriname
- Trinidad and Tobago

== Qualifying tournament ==
The qualification stage ran from February to May 1985. Some match results are unknown.

=== First round ===
==== Group 1 ====
Trinidad and Tobago defeated Grenada and drew with St Vincent and the Grenadines to win the group and advance to the second round. Saint Lucia withdrew due to financial reasons.

===== Table =====
Pos	Team	Pld	W	D	L	GF	GA	GD	Pts	Qualification
1	Trinidad and Tobago	2	1	1	0	6	2	+4	3	Advance to second round
2	Saint Vincent and the Grenadines	2	1	1	0	4	1	+3	3	
3	Grenada	2	0	0	2	1	8	−7	0	
4	Saint Lucia	0	0	0	0	0	0	0	0	Withdrew

===== Results =====
24 February 1985

Saint Vincent and the Grenadines	1–1	Trinidad and Tobago
Ballantyne 83'		C. Denoon 48'

Arnos Vale Stadium, Arnos Vale
20 March 1985

Grenada	1–5	Trinidad and Tobago
Goal		C. Denoon (x2); N. Denoon (x2)

Queen's Park, St. George's
20 March 1985

Saint Vincent and the Grenadines	3–0	Grenada
Soso 9'; Laborde 14', 53'

Arnos Vale Stadium, Arnos Vale

==== Group 2 ====
There is limited information available for group 2. It was contested by Antigua and Barbuda, the Cayman Islands, Dominica and Guadeloupe and Guadeloupe advanced to round two. Three of the match results and the final standings table are unknown.

===== Known results =====
24 February 1985

Antigua and Barbuda	2–1	Dominica
Hurst 43'; Gonsalves 58'		Hippolyte 18'

Antigua Recreation Ground, St. John's
3 March 1985

Antigua and Barbuda	0–1	Guadeloupe
		Wills 21' (pen.)

Antigua Recreation Ground, St. John's
3 March 1985

Dominica	2–1	Cayman Islands
Toussaint 53'; Hippolyte 87'		Ramon 11'

Windsor Park, Roseau

==== Group 3 ====
Suriname defeated both French Guiana and Guyana to win the group and advance to the second round.

===== Table =====
Pos	Team	Pld	W	D	L	GF	GA	GD	Pts	Qualification
1	Suriname	2	2	0	0	2	0	+2	4	Advance to second round
2	Guyana	2	1	0	1	1	1	0	2	
3	French Guiana	2	0	0	2	0	2	−2	0	

===== Results =====
10 March 1985

French Guiana	0–1	Guyana
		Williams

Stade de Baduel, Cayenne
17 March 1985

French Guiana	0–1	Suriname

Stade de Baduel, Cayenne
24 March 1985

Guyana	0–1	Suriname
		Doest 48'

Guyana Defence Force Ground, Georgetown

=== Second round ===
Guadeloupe defeated both Suriname and drew with Trinidad and Tobago to win the group and qualify for the final tournament alongside Suriname who had defeated Trinidad and Tobago in the other match.

==== Table ====
Pos	Team	Pld	W	D	L	GF	GA	GD	Pts	Qualification
1	Guadeloupe	2	1	1	0	2	1	+1	3	Qualification to 1985 CFU Championship
2	Suriname	2	1	0	1	1	1	0	2	Qualification to 1985 CFU Championship
3	Trinidad and Tobago	2	0	1	1	1	2	−1	1	

==== Results ====
3 April 1985

Guadeloupe	1–1	Trinidad and Tobago

Stade de Les Abymes, Les Abymes
27 April 1985

Suriname	0–1	Guadeloupe
		Bruno 72'

Stade de Baduel, Cayenne
5 May 1985

Trinidad and Tobago	0–1	Suriname
		Wijks 6'

Skinner Park, San Fernando

== Final tournament ==
The final tournament was held from 25–29 June 1985. After winning their opening two matches, Martinique were crowned champions when they drew 1–1 in Barbados in their final match.

=== Table ===
Pos	Team	Pld	W	D	L	GF	GA	GD	Pts
1	Martinique	3	2	1	0	5	2	+3	5
2	Barbados	3	0	3	0	2	2	0	3
3	Guadeloupe	3	0	2	1	4	5	−1	2
4	Suriname	3	0	2	1	2	4	−2	2

=== Results ===
25 June 1985

Martinique	2–1	Guadeloupe
Hubert; Cesar		Jean 60' (pen.)

National Stadium, Bridgetown
25 June 1985

Barbados	0–0	Suriname

National Stadium, Bridgetown

27 June 1985

Martinique	2–0	Suriname
Cesar; Toris

National Stadium, Bridgetown
27 June 1985

Barbados	1–1	Guadeloupe
Alleyne		Elizier 26'

National Stadium, Bridgetown

30 June 1985

Suriname	2–2	Guadeloupe
Klinker; Doest		Angloma (x2)

National Stadium, Bridgetown
30 June 1985

Barbados	1–1	Martinique
Chase 47'		Cesar 40'

National Stadium, Bridgetown
