= Renson Haynes =

Vincentian footballer (born 1978)

Personal information
- Date of birth: October 12, 1978 (age 48)
- Place of birth: Saint Vincent and the Grenadines
- Position: Striker

College career
Years	Team	Apps	(Gls)
2002–2004	Central Connecticut Blue Devils		

International career
2001	Saint Vincent and the Grenadines	18	(11)

Managerial career
- 2021: Saint Vincent and the Grenadines

Renson Haynes (born October 12, 1978) is a Vincentian football manager and former player. He has managed the Saint Vincent and the Grenadines national team.

== Early life ==
Haynes is a native of Calliaqua, Saint Vincent and the Grenadines, and started playing football while enrolled at the Calliaqua Anglican School, before playing for the St. Vincent Grammar School and St. Vincent Community College, helping them win two consecutive Inter-Secondary School Football Championships, and was named 1998 Sportsman of the Year.

== College career ==
Haynes attended and played for Central Connecticut State University in the United States through a sports scholarship.

== Club career ==
Haynes was regarded as a Saint Vincent and the Grenadines prospect.

== International career ==
Haynes played for the Saint Vincent and the Grenadines, including during the 2006 FIFA World Cup qualifiers. On June 13, 2004, he scored his first national team goal during a 2–2 tie against Nicaragua. In total, he made eighteen appearances and scored eleven goals for the Saint Vincent and the Grenadines national football team.

== Style of play ==
Haynes could operate as a striker or winger and was known for his versatility.

== Managerial career ==
In 2021, Haynes was appointed manager of the Saint Vincent and the Grenadines national football team to replace Rohan Thomas Jr, who resigned on February 8, 2021. His first task was to prepare for the CONCACAF World Cup qualifiers, when the team would play against Curaçao and the British Virgin Islands.

However, many of the Saint Vincent and the Grenadines national team players were not satisfied with his performance as manager, and accused him of over-interference. After failing to reach the next round of the World Cup qualifiers, his task was to improve the team's performance for the Gold Cup Preliminary round against Haiti.

== Post-managerial career ==
Haynes has worked as the chairman of the New York Vincy Heat Support Committee.

== Personal life ==
Haynes lives in the United States and frequently visits the Saint Vincent and the Grenadines. He is the son of Yvette Haynes.

== Career statistics ==
=== International ===
Appearances and goals by national team and year
National team	Year	Apps	Goals
Saint Vincent and the Grenadines	2001	3	3
Saint Vincent and the Grenadines	2004	11	6
Saint Vincent and the Grenadines	2005	2	1
Saint Vincent and the Grenadines	2006	2	1
Total		18	11

Scores and results list Saint Vincent and the Grenadines' goal tally first, score column indicates score after each Haynes goal.

List of international goals scored by Renson Haynes
No.	Date	Venue	Opponent	Score	Result	Competition	Ref.
1	12 March 2001	Saint George, Saint Vincent and the Grenadines	Saint Lucia	–	2–0	Friendly	
2	8 April 2001	Stade Pierre-Aliker, Fort-de-France, Martinique	British Virgin Islands	3–0	6–0	2001 Caribbean Cup qualification	
3	8 April 2001	Stade Pierre-Aliker, Fort-de-France, Martinique	British Virgin Islands	6–0	6–0	2001 Caribbean Cup qualification	
4	23 May 2004	Warner Park Sporting Complex, Basseterre, Saint Kitts and Nevis	Saint Kitts and Nevis	1–1	2–3	Friendly	
5	13 June 2004	Estadio Cacique Diriangén, Diriamba, Nicaragua	Nicaragua	2–2	2–2	2006 FIFA World Cup qualification	
6	17 November 2004	Hasely Crawford Stadium, Port of Spain, Trinidad and Tobago	Trinidad and Tobago	1–0	1–2	2006 FIFA World Cup qualification	
7	20 November 2004	Gouyave, Grenada	Grenada	2–2	2–3	Friendly	
8	26 November 2004	Arnos Vale Stadium, Arnos Vale, Saint Vincent and the Grenadines	Bermuda	2–1	3–3	2005 Caribbean Cup qualification	
9	28 November 2004	Arnos Vale Stadium, Arnos Vale, Saint Vincent and the Grenadines	Cayman Islands	3–0	4–0	2005 Caribbean Cup qualification	
10	9 January 2005	Manny Ramjohn Stadium, San Fernando, Trinidad and Tobago	Trinidad and Tobago	1–0	1–3	2005 Caribbean Cup qualification	
11	1 October 2006	Independence Park, Kingston, Jamaica	Saint Lucia	7–0	8–0	2007 Caribbean Cup qualification	
