= Hannibal Najjar =

Trinidad and Tobago football manager

Personal information
- Full name: Hannibal George Najjar
- Date of birth: 1953 (age 72–73)
- Place of birth: Trinidad and Tobago

Senior career*
Years	Team	Apps	(Gls)
- Teutonia
- Essex

Managerial career
- 1983–1984: Trinidad and Tobago U21
- 1984–1985: Trinidad and Tobago U23
- 1985–1986: Trinidad and Tobago U17
- 1986–1988: Trinidad and Tobago U20
- 1994–1997: Belhaven Blazers
- 1995–1997: Jackson Chargers
- 1997: Belhaven Blazers (women)
- 1998: Bethel Wildcats
- 1998: Bethel Wildcats (women)
- 1999: Mid-Continent Cougars
- 2000: UMSL Tritons
- 2002–2003: Trinidad and Tobago
- 2013: Mid-Continent Cougars
- * Club domestic league appearances and goals

Hannibal George Najjar (born October 1953) is a Trinidadian retired football player and manager.
