= Bertille St. Clair =

Trinidadian football manager

Personal information
- Place of birth: Trinidad and Tobago

Managerial career
- Years: Team
- 1996: Saint Vincent and the Grenadines
- 1997–2000: Trinidad and Tobago
- 2004–2005: Trinidad and Tobago

Bertille St. Clair is a Trinidadian football manager who has coached the national teams of both Saint Vincent and the Grenadines and Trinidad and Tobago.

He was in charge of Trinidad and Tobago at the Gold Cup in 1998 and 2000.
