= CFU Championship =

Caribbean football tournament

- Organizer(s): CFU
- Founded: 1978; 48 years ago
- Abolished: 1988; 38 years ago
- Region: Caribbean
- Teams: 4
- Related competitions: Caribbean Cup; Copa Centroamericana/Copa de Naciones UNCAF; North American Nations Cup
- Last champion(s): Trinidad and Tobago (2nd title)
- Most championships: Trinidad and Tobago; Martinique (2 titles each)

The CFU Championship, also known as CFU Nations Cup, was an association football competition organized by CFU as its top regional tournament for men's senior national teams from the Caribbean. The tournament was held from 1978 to 1988 and it was the direct predecessor of the Caribbean Cup.

== Results ==
Year	Hosts	Final		Third place game	
Year	Hosts	Champions	Runners-up	Third place	Fourth Place
1978	Trinidad and Tobago	Suriname	Trinidad and Tobago	Haiti	Antigua and Barbuda
1979	Suriname	Haiti	Saint Vincent and the Grenadines	Suriname	Trinidad and Tobago
1981	Puerto Rico	Trinidad and Tobago	Saint Vincent and the Grenadines	Guadeloupe	Puerto Rico
1983	French Guiana	Martinique	Trinidad and Tobago	French Guiana	Antigua and Barbuda
1985	Barbados	Martinique	Barbados	Guadeloupe	Suriname
1988	Martinique	Trinidad and Tobago	Antigua and Barbuda	Martinique	Guadeloupe

== Performances ==
Team	Champions	Runners-up	Third place	Fourth place	Total
Trinidad and Tobago	2 (1981, 1988)	2 (1978, 1983)	–	1 (1979)	5
Martinique	2 (1983, 1985)	–	1 (1988)	–	3
Suriname	1 (1978)	–	1 (1979)	1 (1985)	3
Haiti	1 (1978)	–	–	–	1
Saint Vincent and the Grenadines	–	2 (1979, 1981)	–	–	2
Antigua and Barbuda	–	1 (1988)	–	2 (1978, 1983)	3
Barbados	–	1 (1985)	–	–	1
Guadeloupe	–	–	2 (1981, 1985)	1 (1988)	3
French Guiana	–	–	1 (1983)	–	1
Puerto Rico	–	–	–	1 (1981)	1

Notes

Italic — Hosts

== See also ==
- CFU
- UNCAF
- NAFU
- Caribbean Cup
- Copa Centroamericana/Copa de Naciones UNCAF
- North American Nations Cup
