= 1978 CFU Championship =

Tournament details
- Host country: Trinidad and Tobago
- Dates: 22–29 October 1978
- Teams: 4
- Venues: 2

Final positions
- Champions: Suriname (1st title)
- Runners-up: Trinidad and Tobago
- Third place: Haiti
- Fourth place: Antigua and Barbuda

Tournament statistics
- Matches played: 6
- Goals scored: 17 (2.83 per match)

The 1978 CFU Championship was the inaugural international association football championship for members of the Caribbean Football Union (CFU). Hosted by Trinidad and Tobago, the competition ran from 22–29 October 1978 and was contested by the national teams of Antigua and Barbuda, Haiti, Suriname and Trinidad and Tobago.

In the penultimate match of the round-robin tournament, Suriname were crowned champions as they completed a clean sweep by defeating Antigua and Barbuda 4–0.

== Background ==
The Caribbean Football Union (CFU) was founded in January 1978 as a sub-confederation of the Confederation of North, Central America and Caribbean Association Football (CONCACAF). Later the same year, the first CFU Championship was organised in Trinidad and Tobago.

Haiti did not send a full international team and were instead represented by Aigle Noir AC.

== Format ==
Three qualifying rounds were held to determine the four teams that would participate in the final tournament. For both rounds, teams were drawn into two-legged ties. The team scoring more goals on aggregate in each tie would advance to the next stage.

The final tournament was played as a single round-robin where each team would play all of the others once. The winner would be decided by the total number of points obtained across all matches played.

=== Participants ===
- Antigua and Barbuda
- Barbados
- Dominican Republic
- French Guiana
- Guadeloupe
- Guyana
- Haiti
- Jamaica
- Martinique
- Netherlands Antilles
- Puerto Rico
- Suriname
- Trinidad and Tobago

== Qualification ==
The qualification stage ran from July to October 1978. Some match results are unknown. It is also unclear whether Antigua and Barbuda, the Netherlands Antilles and French Guiana received a bye in the first round or if they contested an unknown tie. A match between Trinidad and Tobago and Grenada which finished 1–1 on 30 July may have been the second leg of a first round tie but it is unknown whether the match was part of the competition as it is unknown if there was a first leg.

1978 CFU Championship qualification
Team 1	Agg.	Team 2	1st leg	2nd leg
First round
Puerto Rico	1–2	Haiti	1–1	0–1
Martinique	w/o (Note: Dominican Republic withdrew.)	Dominican Republic	—	—
Guadeloupe	3–1	Jamaica	2–1	1–0
Guyana	1–4	Suriname	1–2	0–2
Second round
Antigua and Barbuda	draw (Note: Both legs between Antigua and Barbuda and Guadeloupe were drawn but the scores are unknown. Antigua and Barbuda qualified for the final tournament on penalties.)	Guadeloupe	—	—
Netherlands Antilles	0–5	Suriname	0–2	0–3
Trinidad and Tobago	6–5	French Guiana	2–4	4–1 (a.e.t.)
Haiti	5–3	Martinique	1–1	4–2

=== First round ===
In the first round, Haiti defeated Puerto Rico 2–1 on aggregate, Guadeloupe defeated Jamaica 3–1 on aggregate and Suriname defeated Guyana 4–1 on aggregate. The Dominican Republic withdrew from the competition and Martinique received a walkover to the second round.

==== Results ====
20 August 1978

Puerto Rico	1–1	Haiti
Rivero 6'		Jean-Baptiste

Estadio Sixto Escobar, San Juan
26 August 1978

Haiti	1–0	Puerto Rico
Barosy 58'

Stade Sylvio Cator, Port-au-Prince

Haiti won 2–1 on aggregate.

Martinique	Cancelled	Dominican Republic

Dominican Republic	Cancelled	Martinique

Dominican Republic withdrew, Martinique advanced.

2 July 1978

Guadeloupe	1–0	Jamaica

Stade de Les Abymes, Les Abymes
30 July 1978

Jamaica	1–2	Guadeloupe
Clarke 14'

National Stadium, Kingston

Guadaeloupe won 3–1 on aggregate.

9 July 1978

Guyana	1–2	Suriname

Georgetown Cricket Club Ground, Georgetown
30 July 1978

Suriname	2–0	Guyana

National Stadion, Paramaribo

Suriname won 4–1 on aggregate.

=== Second round ===
In the second round, Suriname defeated the Netherlands Antilles 5–0 on aggregate, Trinidad and Tobago defeated French Guiana 6–5 on aggregate and Haiti defeated Martinique 5–3 on aggregate. The results of the Antigua and Barbuda v Guadeloupe tie are unknown but Antigua and Barbuda won on penalties. Suriname, Trinidad and Tobago, Haiti and Antigua and Barbuda qualified for the final tournament.

==== Results ====
27 August 1978

Antigua and Barbuda	Unknown	Guadeloupe

Antigua Recreation Ground, St John's

Both legs ended in a draw result.

Unknown

Guadeloupe	Unknown	Antigua and Barbuda

Stade de Les Abymes, Les Abymes

Tied on aggregate. Antigua and Barbuda won on penalties.

30 September 1978

Netherlands Antilles	0–2	Suriname
		Emanuelson

Ergilio Hato Stadium, Willemstad
13 October 1978

Suriname	3–0	Netherlands Antilles
Emanuelson (x2)

Suriname Stadium, Paramaribo

Suriname won 5–0 on aggregate.

20 August 1978

Trinidad and Tobago	2–4	French Guiana
Pierre 75' (pen.); Archibald 82'		Epailly 22'; Joseph 25'; Tinel 51'; Sainte-Luce 76'

Queen's Park Oval, Port of Spain
2 September 1978

French Guiana	1–4 (a.e.t.)	Trinidad and Tobago
Goal		Cave (x2); Spann; Barrington

Stade de Baduel, Cayenne

Trinidad and Tobago won 6–5 on aggregate.

16 September 1978

Haiti	1–1	Martinique

Stade Sylvio Cator, Port-au-Prince
1 October 1978

Martinique	2–4	Haiti

Stade Louis Achille, Fort-de-France

Haiti won 5–3 on aggregate.

== Final tournament ==
The final tournament was held from 22–29 October 1978. After winning their opening two matches, Suriname were crowned champions of the inaugural competition when they defeated Antigua and Barbuda 4–0 in their final match.

=== Table ===
Pos	Team	Pld	W	D	L	GF	GA	GD	Pts
1	Suriname	3	3	0	0	8	0	+8	6
2	Trinidad and Tobago	3	1	1	1	5	4	+1	3
3	Haiti	3	1	1	1	3	5	−2	3
4	Antigua and Barbuda	3	0	0	3	1	8	−7	0

=== Results ===
22 October 1978

Suriname	3–0	Haiti

Queen's Park Oval, Port of Spain
23 October 1978

Trinidad and Tobago	3–1	Antigua and Barbuda

Skinner Park, San Fernando

25 October 1978

Suriname	1–0	Trinidad and Tobago

Queen's Park Oval, Port of Spain
26 October 1978

Haiti	1–0	Antigua and Barbuda
Louis

Skinner Park, San Fernando

28 October 1978

Suriname	4–0	Antigua and Barbuda
Calor (x2); Leisberg; George

Skinner Park, San Fernando
29 October 1978

Haiti	2–2	Trinidad and Tobago

Queen's Park Oval, Port of Spain
