= Umberto Klinker =

Surinamese footballer

Personal information
- Full name: Umberto Orlando Klinker
- Place of birth: Paramaribo, Surinam
- Position: Forward

Youth career
- 1975–1978: Lions'71
- 1978–1979: Robinhood

Senior career*
Years	Team	Apps	(Gls)
1976–1978	Lions'71		
1979–1995	Robinhood		

International career
1980–1985	Suriname	7	(2)
- * Club domestic league appearances and goals

Umberto Orlando Klinker is a former Surinamese football player who played the majority of his career for S.V. Robinhood in the SVB Hoofdklasse and for the Suriname national team. Klinker helped Robinhood to win several national championships in the eighties and finished as the league top scorer in 1982 and 1983.

== Club career ==
Klinker began his football career playing for Lions'71 in the SVB Eerste Klasse, the second tier of football in Suriname. In 1978, he was recruited and joined the youth ranks of S.V. Robinhood, joining the first team a year later. He made his first appearance for the first team in 1979 in a match against S.V. Leo Victor which ended in a 7–0 win at the National Stadion. He won the national championship a total of 12 times during the span of his career before retiring as a player in 1995. He also finished as the league top scorer in both 1982 and 1983. He would help Robinhood to consecutive CONCACAF Champions' Cup finals, finishing as runners-up to UNAM from Mexico, losing 3–2 on aggregate score in 1983 scoring once in the final; and again against C.F. Atlante from Mexico losing 6–1 on aggregate score a year later. In 1994 and 1995 he helped Robinhood to win the Suriname President's Cup twice.

== International career ==
Klinker was a regular in the youth teams of the Suriname national team, before making his debut for the first team on 12 October 1980 in a 4–0 win against Guyana in the countries 1982 FIFA World Cup qualifying campaign. He scored his first goal on 29 August 1984 against Guyana in a 1–1 draw at the Bourda in Georgetown, Guyana. On 30 June 1985 he scored once more in a 2–2 draw against Guadeloupe in the 1985 CFU Championship.

== Career statistics ==
Scores and results list Suriname' goal tally first.

Goal	Date	Venue	Opponent	Score	Result	Competition
1.	29 August 1984	Bourda, Georgetown, Guyana	Guyana	1–0	1–1	1986 FIFA World Cup qualification
2.	30 June 1985	Barbados National Stadium, Bridgetown, Barbados	Guadeloupe	1–1	2–2	1985 CFU Championship

== Honours ==
S.V. Robinhood

- SVB Hoofdklasse (12): 1979, 1980, 1981, 1983, 1984, 1985, 1986, 1987, 1988, 1989, 1993, 1995
- Suriname President's Cup: 1994, 1995
- CONCACAF Champions' Cup runner-up: 1982, 1983

Individual

- SVB Hoofdklasse top goalscorer: 1982, 1983
