= 1983 CFU Championship =

Tournament details
- Host country: French Guiana
- Dates: 23–27 July 1983
- Teams: 4

Final positions
- Champions: Martinique (1st title)
- Runners-up: Trinidad and Tobago
- Third place: French Guiana
- Fourth place: Antigua and Barbuda

Tournament statistics
- Matches played: 6
- Goals scored: 11 (1.83 per match)

The 1983 CFU Championship was the fourth international association football championship for members of the Caribbean Football Union (CFU). Hosted by French Guiana, the competition ran from 23–27 July 1983 and was contested by the national teams of Antigua and Barbuda, French Guiana, Martinique and Trinidad and Tobago.

Martinique won the competition for the first time after a goalless draw with hosts French Guiana in the final round of matches of the round-robin tournament.

== Background ==
The Caribbean Football Union (CFU) was founded in January 1978 as a sub-confederation of the Confederation of North, Central America and Caribbean Association Football (CONCACAF). Later the same year, the first CFU Championship was organised in Trinidad and Tobago.

Trinidad and Tobago were the defending champions after winning the previous edition in Puerto Rico. Three different teams had won the three previous tournaments - Haiti, Suriname and Trinidad and Tobago.

== Format ==
Three qualifying rounds were held to determine two of the four teams that would participate in the final tournament. Hosts French Guyana and holders Trinidad and Tobago qualified automatically. For the first and second rounds, the 12 teams were drawn into four sections. Within each section, two two-legged ties would take place. The team scoring more goals on aggregate in each tie would advance to the next stage.

In the play-off round, the remaining four teams were drawn into two two-legged ties. The team scoring more goals on aggregate in each tie would qualify for the final tournament.

The final tournament was played as a single round-robin where each team would play all of the others once. The winner would be decided by the total number of points obtained across all matches played.

=== Participants ===
- Antigua and Barbuda
- Barbados
- Dominica
- French Guiana
- Guadeloupe
- Guyana
- Jamaica
- Martinique
- Puerto Rico
- Netherlands Antilles
- Saint Kitts and Nevis
- Saint Vincent and the Grenadines
- Suriname
- Trinidad and Tobago

== Qualification ==
The qualification stage ran from February to June 1983. Some match results are unknown.

=== Group 1 ===
In the first round, Guyana received a bye. Barbados defeated Suriname 1–0 on aggregate. In the second round, Guyana defeated Barbados 3–1 on aggregate to advance to the play-offs.

Group 1
Team 1	Agg.	Team 2	1st leg	2nd leg
First round
Barbados	1–0	Suriname	1–0	0–0 (Note: Both matches played in Barbados due to political unrest in Suriname.)
Guyana	Bye	n/a	—	—
Second round
Barbados	1–3	Guyana	1–1	0–2

==== First round ====
6 March 1983

Barbados	1–0	Suriname

8 March 1983

Suriname	0–0	Barbados

Barbados

Barbados won 1–0 on aggregate.

==== Second round ====
24 April 1983

Barbados	1–1	Guyana

8 May 1983

Guyana	2–0	Barbados

Bourda, Georgetown

Guyana won 3–1 on aggregate.

=== Group 2 ===
In the first round, the Netherlands Antilles received a bye. Martinique defeated St Vincent and the Grenadines 3–1 on aggregate. In the second round, the results of the Martinique v Netherlands Antilles tie are unknown but Martinique advanced to the play-offs.

Group 2
Team 1	Agg.	Team 2	1st leg	2nd leg
First round
Saint Vincent and the Grenadines	1–3	Martinique	1–3	— (Note: It is unknown if the second leg took place.)
Netherlands Antilles	Bye	n/a	—	—
Second round
Martinique	unknown (Note: The results of the Martinique v Netherlands Antilles tie are unknown. Martinique advanced.)	Netherlands Antilles	—	—

==== First round ====
20 February 1983

Saint Vincent and the Grenadines	1–3	Martinique

Arnos Vale

==== Second round ====
Martinique	Unknown	Netherlands Antilles

Netherlands Antilles	Unknown	Martinique

Results unknown, Martinique advanced.

=== Group 3 ===
In the first round, Antigua and Barbuda received a bye. Guadeloupe defeated Dominica 3–1 on aggregate. In the second round, Antigua and Barbuda defeated Guadeloupe 6–5 on aggregate to advance to the play-offs.

Group 3
Team 1	Agg.	Team 2	1st leg	2nd leg
First round
Guadeloupe	3–1	Dominica	1–0	2–1
Antigua and Barbuda	Bye	n/a	—	—
Second round
Guadeloupe	5–6	Antigua and Barbuda	2–3	3–3

==== First round ====
20 February 1983

Guadeloupe	1–0	Dominica

6 March 1983

Dominica	1–2	Guadeloupe

Roseau

Guadeloupe won 3–1 on aggregate.

==== Second round ====
2 April 1983

Guadeloupe	2–3	Antigua and Barbuda

8 May 1983

Antigua and Barbuda	3–3	Guadeloupe
Richards 15'; Joseph 44'; Lewis 55'		Galoux 29', 46'; Silvedire 41'

St. John's

Antigua and Barbuda won 6–5 on aggregate.

=== Group 4 ===
In the first round, St Kitts and Nevis received a bye. Puerto Rico withdrew and Jamaica received a walkover. In the second round, Jamaica withdrew and St Kitts and Nevis received a walkover to advance to the play-offs.

Group 4
Team 1	Agg.	Team 2	1st leg	2nd leg
First round
Jamaica	w/o (Note: Puerto Rico withdrew.)	Puerto Rico	—	—
Saint Kitts and Nevis	Bye	n/a	—	—
Second round
Saint Kitts and Nevis	w/o (Note: Jamaica withdrew.)	Jamaica	—	—

==== First round ====
Jamaica	Cancelled	Puerto Rico

Puerto Rico	Cancelled	Jamaica

Puerto Rico withdrew, Jamaica advanced.

==== Second round ====
Saint Kitts and Nevis	Cancelled	Jamaica

Jamaica	Cancelled	Saint Kitts and Nevis

Jamaica withdrew, St Kitts and Nevis advanced.

=== Play-offs ===
In the play-offs, Antigua and Barbuda defeated Guyana 4–0 on aggregate and Martinique defeated St Kitts and Nevis 12–0 on aggregate to qualify for the final tournament.

Play-offs
Team 1	Agg.	Team 2	1st leg	2nd leg
Guyana	0–4	Antigua and Barbuda	0–0	0–4
Martinique	12–0	Saint Kitts and Nevis	7–0	5–0

==== Results ====
29 May 1983

Guyana	0–0	Antigua and Barbuda

5 June 1983

Antigua and Barbuda	4–0	Guyana

Antigua and Barbuda won 4–0 on aggregate.

25 May 1983

Martinique	7–0	Saint Kitts and Nevis

5 June 1983

Saint Kitts and Nevis	0–5	Martinique

Martinique won 12–0 on aggregate.

== Final tournament ==
The final tournament was held from 23–27 July 1983. After winning their opening two matches, Martinique were crowned champions when they played out a goalless draw in their final match.

=== Table ===
Pos	Team	Pld	W	D	L	GF	GA	GD	Pts
1	Martinique	3	2	1	0	5	1	+4	5
2	Trinidad and Tobago	3	2	0	1	4	4	0	4
3	French Guiana	3	1	1	1	1	1	0	3
4	Antigua and Barbuda	3	0	0	3	1	5	−4	0

=== Results ===
23 July 1983

Martinique	2–0	Antigua and Barbuda

Stade Georges-Chaumet, Cayenne
23 July 1983

Trinidad and Tobago	1–0	French Guiana

Stade Georges-Chaumet, Cayenne

25 July 1983

Martinique	3–1	Trinidad and Tobago

Stade Georges-Chaumet, Cayenne
25 July 1983

Antigua and Barbuda	0–1	French Guiana

Stade Georges-Chaumet, Cayenne

27 July 1983

French Guiana	0–0	Martinique

Stade Georges-Chaumet, Cayenne
27 July 1983

Trinidad and Tobago	2–1	Antigua and Barbuda

Stade Georges-Chaumet, Cayenne
