= Trinidad and Tobago national football team =

Men's association football team

Trinidad and Tobago
- Nickname: The Soca Warriors
- Association: Trinidad and Tobago Football Association (TTFA)
- Confederation: CONCACAF (North America)
- Sub-confederation: CFU (Caribbean)
- Head coach: Derek King
- Captain: Kevin Molino
- Most caps: Angus Eve (117)
- Top scorer: Stern John (70)
- Home stadium: Hasely Crawford Stadium
- FIFA code: TRI
First colours	Second colours

FIFA ranking
- Current: 104 ▲1 (18 November 2026)
- Highest: 25 (June 2001)
- Lowest: 106 (October 2010)

First international
- British Guiana 1–4 Trinidad and Tobago (British Guiana; 21 July 1905)

Biggest win
- Trinidad and Tobago 15–0 Anguilla (Arima, Trinidad and Tobago; 10 November 2019)

Biggest defeat
- Mexico 7–0 Trinidad and Tobago (Mexico City, Mexico; 8 October 2000); United States 7–0 Trinidad and Tobago (Orlando, United States; 31 January 2021)

World Cup
- Appearances: 1 (first in 2006)
- Best result: Group stage (2006)

CONCACAF Championship / Gold Cup
- Appearances: 19 (first in 1967)
- Best result: Runners-up (1973)

CONCACAF Nations League
- Appearances: 5 (first in 2019–20)
- Best result: Quarter-finals (2023–24)

CFU Championship / Caribbean Cup
- Appearances: 23 (first in 1978)
- Best result: Champions (1981, 1988, 1989, 1992, 1994, 1995, 1996, 1997, 1999, 2001)
Medal record
CONCACAF Championship
Silver medal – second place	1973 Haiti	Team
Bronze medal – third place	1989 North America	Team
CFU Championship / Caribbean Cup
Gold medal – first place	1981 Puerto Rico	Team
Gold medal – first place	1988 Martinique	Team
Gold medal – first place	1989 Barbados	Team
Gold medal – first place	1992 Trinidad and Tobago	Team
Gold medal – first place	1994 Trinidad and Tobago	Team
Gold medal – first place	1995 Cayman Islands and Jamaica	Team
Gold medal – first place	1996 Trinidad and Tobago	Team
Gold medal – first place	1997 Antigua and Barbuda and Saint Kitts and Nevis	Team
Gold medal – first place	1999 Trinidad and Tobago	Team
Gold medal – first place	2001 Trinidad and Tobago	Team
Silver medal – second place	1978 Trinidad and Tobago	Team
Silver medal – second place	1983 French Guiana	Team
Silver medal – second place	1991 Jamaica	Team
Silver medal – second place	1998 Trinidad and Tobago and Jamaica	Team
Silver medal – second place	2007 Trinidad and Tobago	Team
Silver medal – second place	2012 Antigua and Barbuda	Team
Silver medal – second place	2014 Jamaica	Team
Bronze medal – third place	1993 Jamaica	Team
Bronze medal – third place	2005 Barbados	Team

The Trinidad and Tobago national football team represents Trinidad and Tobago in men's international football, and is governed by the Trinidad and Tobago Football Association, the governing body for football in Trinidad and Tobago founded in 1908. It has been a full member of FIFA and CONCACAF since 1964, and is also a member of CFU in the Caribbean Zone.

Trinidad and Tobago has qualified for the FIFA World Cup once in 2006. Trinidad and Tobago has participated nineteen times in CONCACAF's premier continental competition, finishing as runners-up in the 1973 CONCACAF Championship. The team's best performance under the CONCACAF Gold Cup format was reaching the semifinals in 2000. It has participated four times in League A and once in League B of the CONCACAF Nations League, reaching the quarter-finals in the 2023–24 edition. It is the most successful team in the Caribbean Zone by winning 10 CFU Championship/Caribbean Cup titles. The team also won the silver medal at the 1974 Central American and Caribbean Games.

Trinidad and Tobago's debut in international competitions was in the CONCACAF qualifiers for the 1966 FIFA World Cup. The team's first victory was by defeating British Guyana 4–1 in 1905, which was also its first match ever.

The Soca Warriors qualified for the 2006 FIFA World Cup, after defeating Bahrain 2–1 on aggregate in the CONCACAF–AFC intercontinental play-off. The separate Trinidad and Tobago football teams are not related to the national team and are not directly affiliated with FIFA or CONCACAF, but are affiliated with TTFA.

== History ==
=== 1970s ===
At the 1973 CONCACAF Championship, Trinidad and Tobago fell two points short of qualifying for the 1974 World Cup in controversial fashion. Trinidad and Tobago lost a crucial game on 4 December 1973 against hosts Haiti 2–1 after being denied five goals. The referee, José Roberto Henríquez of El Salvador, and Canadian linesman James Higuet were subsequently banned for life by FIFA for the dubious events of the match.

=== 1980s to 1990s: The Strike Squad ===
Trinidad and Tobago came within one game of qualifying for the 1990 World Cup in Italy. Nicknamed the "Strike Squad" during the qualifying campaign, Trinidad and Tobago needed only a draw to qualify in their final game played at home against the United States on 19 November 1989. In front of an over-capacity crowd of more than 30,000 at the National Stadium on "Red Day", Paul Caligiuri of the United States scored the only goal of the game in the 38th minute crushing Trinidad and Tobago's qualification hopes. For the good behaviour of the crowd at the stadium, despite the devastating loss and overcrowded stands, the spectators of Trinidad and Tobago were awarded the FIFA Fair Play Award in 1989.

=== 2000s ===
==== 2006 FIFA World Cup ====
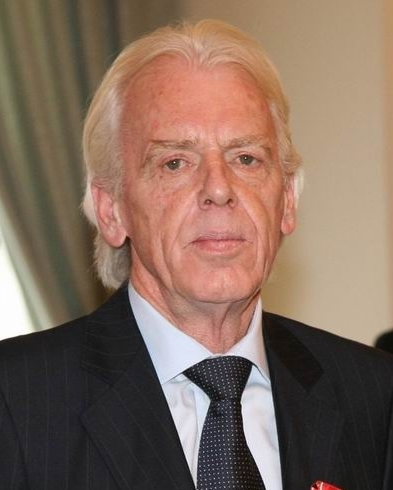
In 2006, Leo Beenhakker (1942–2025) was the manager of the national football team of Trinidad and Tobago

Trinidad and Tobago qualified for the 2006 World Cup in Germany, its first-ever qualification for the tournament. During their qualifying campaign, they sat at the bottom of the table in the final round of qualifying with one point from three. However, after the arrival of Leo Beenhakker as team coach and the recalling of veteran players Dwight Yorke and Russell Latapy, Trinidad and Tobago reversed its fortunes and placed fourth in the group. They qualified via a play-off against Bahrain, recovering from a 1–1 draw at home to win 1–0 in Manama, Bahrain to book a place in the finals. As a result, Trinidad and Tobago became the smallest country to qualify for the FIFA World Cup, a record they held until Iceland reached their first World Cup in 2018.

In Germany, Trinidad and Tobago were grouped with England, Sweden and Paraguay in Group B.They played their initial game, drawing 0–0 against Sweden, even though they were reduced to ten men early in the second half. They faced losses in their remaining matches against England and Paraguay, each by a 2–0 margin.

Team	Pld	W	D	L	GF	GA	GD	Pts
England	3	2	1	0	5	2	+3	7
Sweden	3	1	2	0	3	2	+1	5
Paraguay	3	1	0	2	2	2	0	3
Trinidad and Tobago	3	0	1	2	0	4	−4	1

Team	Score	Team
Trinidad and Tobago	0–0	Sweden
England	2–0	Trinidad and Tobago
Paraguay	2–0	Trinidad and Tobago

=== 2010s ===
==== 2010 World Cup Cycle ====
Trinidad and Tobago began their campaign in the second round against Bermuda. Trinidad and Tobago lost the first match 2–1 at home, but bounced back to win the away leg 2–0 to progress to the third round 3–2 on aggregate. The Soca Warriors entered Group 1 alongside the United States, Guatemala, and Cuba. They then progressed to the Hexagonal round, finishing second in the group with eleven points from six games. There they faced Costa Rica, El Salvador, Honduras, Mexico and the United States. The group began badly for Trinidad and Tobago as they drew 2–2 with El Salvador after leading 2–0, and then drew 1–1 with Honduras. Three consecutive losses, to the United States, Costa Rica and Mexico, put the Soca Warriors in last place with two points from five matches. After defeating El Salvador 1–0, they suffered further losses to Honduras and the United States the following month, ending their hopes of qualifying, and they eventually finished bottom of the group.

==== 2014 World Cup Cycle ====
Trinidad and Tobago entered qualification for the 2014 World Cup in the second round as a seeded team, with Guyana, Bermuda and Barbados also drawn in Group B. The Soca Warriors defeated Bermuda (1–0) and Barbados (2–0) in their first two matches. However, on 7 October 2011, they lost away to Bermuda in Devonshire Parish 2–1. The team recovered four days later by defeating Barbados 4–0 in the Hasely Crawford Stadium with a hat-trick from Lester Peltier. Entering the final two matches in the Second Round, Trinidad and Tobago were in second place, behind Guyana by one point. As only the group winners would advance to the third round, the Soca Warriors needed to take four points in the two matches against Guyana to advance. Trinidad and Tobago first traveled to Providence, Guyana to face the Golden Jaguars on 11 November 2011. With an early goal from Ricky Shakes and another from Leon Cort in the 81st minute, Trinidad and Tobago trailed 2–0 and faced elimination. Kenwyne Jones pull a goal back in the 93rd minute, but the match ended 2–1 to Guyana. On 12 January 2012, Otto Pfister was sacked after the country's earliest exit from World Cup qualification since 1994.

==== 2018 World Cup Cycle ====
Trinidad and Tobago entered qualification for the 2018 FIFA World Cup in the fourth round and were drawn into Group C with Guatemala, Saint Vincent and the Grenadines, and the United States. The team finished second in the group with 11 points to qualify for the Hexagonal. However, they finished in sixth place in the final round with only six points, even though they eliminated the United States from World Cup contention with a 2–1 victory in the final match.

==== 2022 World Cup Cycle ====
Trinidad and Tobago entered qualification for the 2018 FIFA World Cup in the first round and were drawn into Group F with Saint Kitts and Nevis, Puerto Rico, Bahamas, and Guyana. The team finished second in the group with 8 points and failed to qualify for the 2022 FIFA World Cup.

==== 2026 World Cup Cycle ====
Trinidad and Tobago entered qualification for the 2026 FIFA World Cup in the second round and were drawn into Group B with Saint Kitts and Nevis, Grenada, Bahamas, and Costa Rica. They finished second in their group and thus advanced to the third round, where they finished third in their group and were eliminated from World Cup qualification.

== Team image ==
=== Home stadium ===
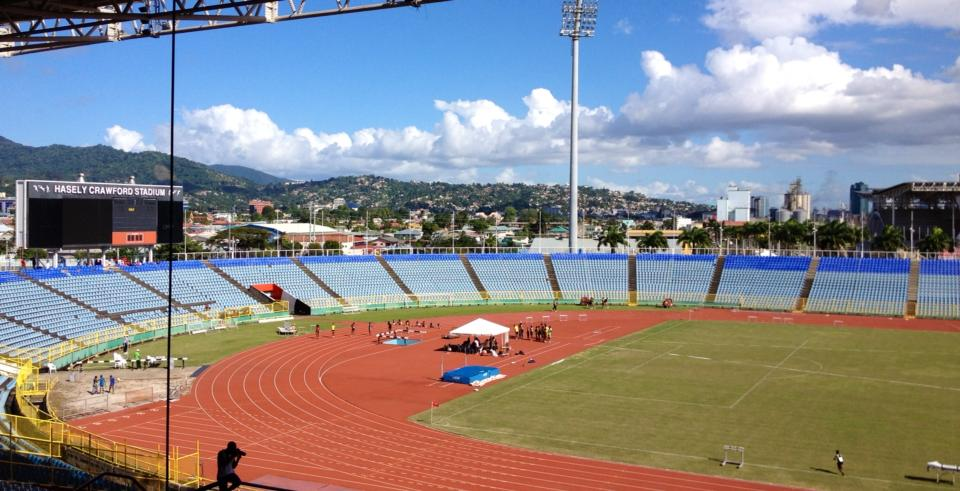
Hasely Crawford Stadium became the home of the national team in 1980

For the first eighty years of their existence, Trinidad and Tobago played their home matches all around the country with Queen's Park Oval, generally thought of as the most picturesque and largest of the old cricket grounds in the West Indies, as the most often used venue. The cricket ground served as the country's largest stadium until the new National Stadium was built in Mucurapo, Port of Spain, to host the nation's athletics competitions and international football matches.

The stadium later was renovated and renamed after Hasely Crawford, the first person from Trinidad and Tobago to win an Olympic gold medal, prior to Trinidad and Tobago hosting the 2001 FIFA U-17 World Championship. The stadium currently has a seating capacity of 23,000 and is owned by the Trinidad and Tobago government and managed through the Ministry of Sport via its special purpose state agency called SporTT.

In recent years, the TTFA have hosted matches at the smaller 10,000 seat Ato Boldon Stadium in Couva, citing a problem with the lighting system at Hasely Crawford Stadium, lower expenses for matches at Ato Boldon, and fans being seated closer to the pitch. Trinidad and Tobago hosted two games during "The Hex" in late 2017. They lost to Honduras 1–2 on 1 September 2017. On 10 October 2017, Trinidad and Tobago defeated the United States 2–1, causing the United States to fail to qualify for the World Cup for the first time since 1986. Ato Boldon Stadium has since hosted friendlies against Grenada, Guyana, and Panama.

=== Supporters ===
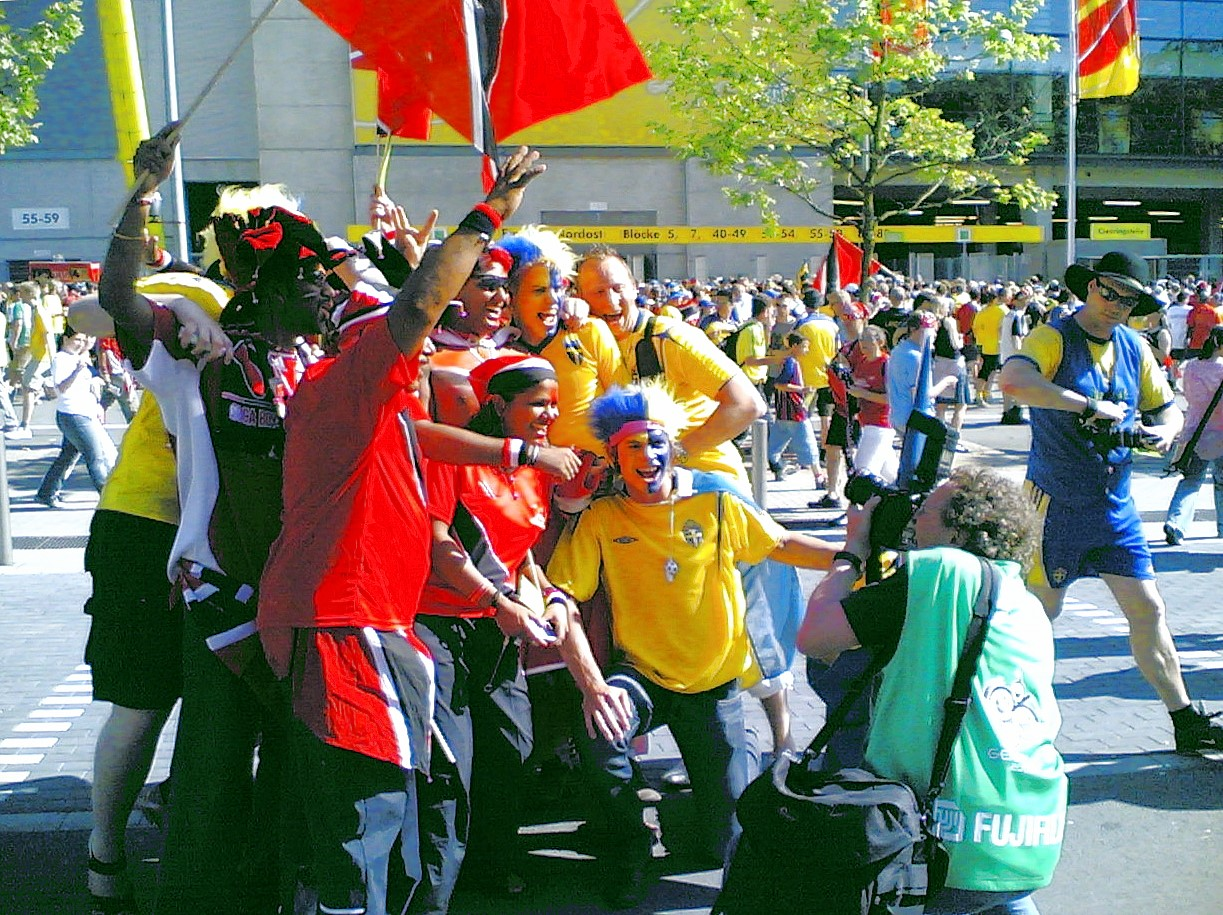
Trinidad and Tobago supporters before the team's opening 2006 World Cup match against Sweden

The major supporters' group for the national team is the Soca Warriors Supporters Club or the "Warrior Nation". The group is a non-profit organisation that is independent of the Trinidad and Tobago Football Association. Formed shortly after Trinidad and Tobago secured qualification for the 2006 FIFA World Cup, the supporters' club was organised by Soca Warriors Online founder Inshan Mohammed and Nigel Myers.

The group's activities include promoting teams locally and globally, lobbying the Trinidad and Tobago Football Association as representatives of football fans, advocating fair pricing and allocation of event tickets, organising travel for fans to home and away matches, providing a family-oriented fans' organisation, and promoting football among the young people of Trinidad and Tobago.

=== Kit sponsorship ===
Kit supplier	Period
(Trinidad and Tobago) Rossi	1989
(United Kingdom) Umbro	1992
(Mexico) Atletica	1999
(Switzerland) Power	2000
(Italy) L-Sporto	2001–2002
(Brazil) Finta	2004–2005
(Germany) Adidas	2005–2010
(Spain) Joma	2014–2017
(United States) Capelli Sport	2019
(United States) BOL	2021–2023
(United States) Capelli Sport	2023–present

== Results and fixtures ==
The following is a list of match results in the last 12 months, as well as any future matches that have been scheduled.

Win Draw Loss Fixture

=== 2025 ===
13 November 2026 FIFA World Cup qualification – CONCACAF third round	Trinidad and Tobago	1–1	Jamaica	Port of Spain, Trinidad and Tobago
20:00 UTC−4	Molino 85'	Report	Cephas 53'	Stadium: Hasely Crawford Stadium; Attendance: 16,629; Referee: Walter López Castellanos (Guatemala)

18 November 2026 FIFA World Cup qualification	Trinidad and Tobago	2–2	Bermuda	Port of Spain, Trinidad and Tobago
21:00 UTC−4	Henry 9'; James 66'	Report	Tucker 60'; Parfitt 65'	Stadium: Hasely Crawford Stadium; Referee: Jose Raúl Torres Rivera (Puerto Rico)

=== 2026 ===
15 March Friendly	Bolivia	3–0	Trinidad and Tobago	Santa Cruz, Bolivia
16:00 UTC−4	Haquín 23'; Godoy 38'; Nava 51'	Report		Stadium: Estadio Ramón Tahuichi Aguilera; Attendance: 15,000; Referee: Guillermo Guerrero (Ecuador)

27 March 2026 FIFA Series	Venezuela	4–1	Trinidad and Tobago	Tashkent, Uzbekistan
15:00 UTC+5	Alfonzo 60', 67'; Rondón 81', 85'	Report	Moore 52'	Stadium: Pakhtakor Central Stadium; Referee: Rustam Lutfullin (Uzbekistan)

30 March 2026 FIFA Series	Gabon	2–2 (3–2 p)	Trinidad and Tobago	Tashkent, Uzbekistan
15:00 UTC+5	Nzé Bagnama (yellow card) 25' (yellow-red card) 56'; Kanga 33'; Essang-Matouti 54'	Report	L. García 53', 90'	Stadium: Pakhtakor Central Stadium; Referee: Ilgiz Tantashev (Uzbekistan)
	Penalties
	Kanga (penalty scored); Lemina (penalty missed); Obiang (penalty missed); Mbemba (penalty scored); Mboula (penalty scored)		(penalty missed) Cardines; (penalty scored) Rochford; (penalty missed) Powder; (penalty scored) Moore; (penalty missed) L. García

30 May Friendly	South Korea	5–0	Trinidad and Tobago	Provo, United States
19:00 UTC−6	Son Heung-min 40', 43' (pen.); Cho Gue-sung 65', 77'; Hwang Hee-chan 75' (pen.)	Report		Stadium: South Field; Attendance: 3,454; Referee: Victor Rivas (United States)

9 June Friendly	Russia	3–0	Trinidad and Tobago	Kaliningrad, Russia
20:00 UTC+3	Beveyev 7'; Silyanov 15'; Batrakov 60'	Report		Stadium: Kaliningrad Stadium; Referee: Nenad Minaković (Serbia)

26 July Friendly	Louisville City FC	1–0	Trinidad and Tobago	Louisville, United States
	Duke 43'			Stadium: Lynn Family Stadium; Attendance: 7,028; Referee: Deny Kulasinac (United States)

24 September 2026-27 CONCACAF Nations League A Group Stage	Haiti	3–2	Trinidad and Tobago	Kingston, Jamaica
19:00 UTC−5	Picault 23'; Metusala 90+1'; Isidor 90+8'	Report	Frederick 31'; L. García 59'	Stadium: Sabina Park; Attendance: 277; Referee: Filip Dujic (Canada)

27 September 2026-27 CONCACAF Nations League A Group Stage	Trinidad and Tobago	1–2	Dominican Republic	Port of Spain, Trinidad and Tobago
21:00 UTC−4	Phillips 37'	Report	Mörschel 42'; Mariano 50'	Stadium: Hasely Crawford Stadium; Attendance: 3,361; Referee: Reon Radix (Grenada)

1 October 2026-27 CONCACAF Nations League A Group Stage	Curaçao	1–0	Trinidad and Tobago	Willemstad, Curaçao
18:00 UTC−4	J. Bacuna 58'	Report		Stadium: Ergilio Hato Stadium; Attendance: 7,485; Referee: Oshane Nation (Jamaica)

4 October 2026-27 CONCACAF Nations League A Group Stage	Trinidad and Tobago	1–1	Curaçao	Port of Spain, Trinidad and Tobago
18:00 UTC−4	Phillip 39'	Report	Paulina 61'	Stadium: Hasely Crawford Stadium; Attendance: 3,977; Referee: Nelson Salgado (Honduras)

12 November 2026–27 CONCACAF Nations League Play-in	Antigua and Barbuda	2–3	Trinidad and Tobago	St. John's, Antigua and Barbuda
19:00 UTC−4	Telfer 3' (o.g.); Satchell 90+3'	Report	Gilbert 15'; Gill 25'; Garcia 45'	Stadium: Sir Vivian Richards Stadium; Referee: Adonis Carrasco (Dominican Republic)

16 November 2026–27 CONCACAF Nations League Play-in	Trinidad and Tobago	1–1 (4–3 agg.)	Antigua and Barbuda	Port of Spain, Trinidad and Tobago
20:00 UTC−4	Gilbert 44'	Report	Massicot 13'	Stadium: Hasely Crawford Stadium; Referee: Keylor Herrera (Costa Rica)

=== 2027 ===
March 2027 CONCACAF Gold Cup prelims	Trinidad and Tobago	v	Suriname	Trinidad and Tobago

March 2027 CONCACAF Gold Cup prelims	Suriname	v	Trinidad and Tobago	Suriname

== Coaching staff ==
Position	Staff
Technical Director	(Trinidad and Tobago) Anton Corneal
Head coach	(Trinidad and Tobago) Derek King
Assistant Coach	(Trinidad and Tobago) Russell Latapy (England) Neil Wood
Goalkeeper Coach	(Trinidad and Tobago) Rogerius Kimble
Strength & Conditiong Coach	(Australia) Anthony Crea
Academy Manager	(Trinidad and Tobago) Borlin Kumar Jr.
Equipment Manager	(Trinidad and Tobago) Mack Cummings
Fitness Coach	(Trinidad and Tobago) Renatus Prince
Doctor	(Trinidad and Tobago) Georginus Southwood
Logistics Manager	(Trinidad and Tobago) Anil Chowdhury
Physiotherapist	(Trinidad and Tobago) Denzal Carr
Massage Therapist/Trainer	(Trinidad and Tobago) Hakeem Edwards
Team Manager	(Trinidad and Tobago) Elanus Turing
Media Officer	(Trinidad and Tobago) Cletus Monroe

=== Coaching history ===
- (Trinidad and Tobago) Joffre Chambers (1964)
- (Hungary) Amerigo Brunner (1965–1966)
- (Trinidad and Tobago) Conrad Braithwaite (1965–1967)
- (Trinidad and Tobago) Michael Laing (1968)
- (Trinidad and Tobago) Trevor Smith (1969)
- (England) Kevin Verity (1972–1973)
- (Germany) Rudi Gutendorf (1976)
- (Trinidad and Tobago) Edgar Vidale (1976)
- (Trinidad and Tobago) Alvin Corneal (1980)
- (Trinidad and Tobago) Kenneth Butcher (1980)
- (Trinidad and Tobago) Roderick Warner (1984–1985)
- (Trinidad and Tobago) Everald Cummings (1988–1989)
- (Trinidad and Tobago) Kenwyn Cooper (1989)
- (Trinidad and Tobago) Alvin Corneal (1990)
- (Trinidad and Tobago) Edgar Vidale (1990–1991)
- (Trinidad and Tobago) Muhammad Isa (1992)
- (Brazil) Clovis de Oliveira (1992)
- (Trinidad and Tobago) Everald Cummings (1993)
- (Trinidad and Tobago) Kenny Joseph (1994)
- (Federal Republic of Yugoslavia) Zoran Vraneš (1994–1996)
- (Germany) Jochen Figge (1996)
- (Trinidad and Tobago) Kenny Joseph (1996)
- (Brazil) Sebastian de Araújo (1996)
- (Trinidad and Tobago) Edgar Vidale (1997)
- (Trinidad and Tobago) Bertille St. Clair (1997–2000)
- (Scotland) Ian Porterfield (2000–2001)
- (Brazil) René Simões (2001–2002)
- (Trinidad and Tobago) Clayton Morris (2002)
- (Trinidad and Tobago) Hannibal Najjar (2002–2003)
- (Serbia and Montenegro) Zoran Vraneš (2003)
- (Curaçao) Stuart Charles-Fevrier (2003)
- (Trinidad and Tobago) Ron La Forest (2004)
- (Trinidad and Tobago) Bertille St. Clair (2004–2005)
- (Netherlands) Leo Beenhakker (2005–2006)
- (Netherlands) Wim Rijsbergen (2006–2007)
- (Trinidad and Tobago) Anton Corneal (2008)
- (Colombia) Francisco Maturana (2008–2009)
- (Trinidad and Tobago) Russell Latapy (2009–2011)
- (Germany) Otto Pfister (2011–2012)
- (Trinidad and Tobago) Hutson Charles (2012–2013)
- (Trinidad and Tobago) Jamaal Shabazz (2012–2013)
- (Trinidad and Tobago) Stephen Hart (2013–2016)
- (Belgium) Tom Saintfiet (2016–2017)
- (Trinidad and Tobago) Dennis Lawrence (2017–2019)
- (England) Terry Fenwick (2020–2021)
- (Trinidad and Tobago) Angus Eve (2021–2024)
- (Trinidad and Tobago) Derek King (2024) (2026-present)
- (Trinidad and Tobago) Dwight Yorke (2024-2026)

== Players ==
For all past and present players who have appeared for the national team, see Trinidad and Tobago national team players.

=== Current squad ===
The following players were named in the squad for the 2026–27 CONCACAF Nations League A matches against Haiti, Dominican Republic and Curaçao (twice) on 25, 28 September, 1 and 4 October 2026; respectively.

Caps and goals updated as of 4 October 2026, after the match against Curaçao.

No.	Pos.	Player	Date of birth (age)	Caps	Goals	Club
1	GK	Jabari Brice	22 February 1999 (age 27)	4	0	(Trinidad and Tobago Football Association) Club Sando
21	GK	Jahiem Wickham	26 February 2003 (age 23)	0	0	(United States Soccer Federation) Crown Legacy
22	GK	Denzil Smith	12 October 1999 (age 27)	28	0	(United States Soccer Federation) AV Alta
2	DF	Déron Payne	25 September 2002 (age 24)	6	0	(Royal Dutch Football Association) Volendam
3	DF	Kobi Henry	26 April 2004 (age 22)	9	2	(United States Soccer Federation) Real Salt Lake
4	DF	Jaheim Joseph	26 October 2003 (age 23)	4	0	(Trinidad and Tobago Football Association) Club Sando
5	DF	Neveal Hackshaw	21 September 1995 (age 31)	41	2	(United States Soccer Federation) Oakland Roots
12	DF	Shervohnez Hamilton	16 November 2003 (age 23)	4	0	(Trinidad and Tobago Football Association) Club Sando
17	DF	Justin Garcia	26 October 1995 (age 31)	36	2	(Trinidad and Tobago Football Association) Defence Force
19	DF	Rio Cardines	7 January 2006 (age 20)	12	0	(The Football Association) Bristol City
23	DF	Noah Powder	27 October 1998 (age 28)	40	2	(United States Soccer Federation) Westchester
	DF	Josiah Trimmingham	14 December 1996 (age 29)	15	1	(Jamaica Football Federation) Phoenix Chapelton Maroons
	DF	Andrew De Gannes	9 April 2003 (age 23)	1	0	(United States Soccer Federation) St. Louis City
	DF	Kieran Ngwenya	25 September 2002 (age 24)	1	0	(The Football Association) Rotherham United
8	MF	Luke Phillip	21 August 2004 (age 22)	2	1	(Trinidad and Tobago Football Association) Club Sando
9	MF	Daniel David	5 December 2002 (age 23)	9	0	(Trinidad and Tobago Football Association) Club Sando
14	MF	Wayne Frederick	13 June 2004 (age 22)	5	0	(United States Soccer Federation) Colorado Rapids
15	MF	Dantaye Gilbert	3 December 2004 (age 21)	11	1	(Football Association of the Czech Republic) Baník Ostrava
16	MF	Michel Poon-Angeron	19 April 2001 (age 25)	24	1	(United States Soccer Federation) Portland Hearts of Pine
18	MF	Andre Rampersad	2 February 1995 (age 31)	36	1	(Canadian Soccer Association) HFX Wanderers
20	MF	Real Gill	23 January 2003 (age 23)	20	2	(United States Soccer Federation) One Knoxville
	MF	Daniel Phillips	18 January 2001 (age 25)	28	0	(The Football Association) Stevenage
6	FW	Kaihim Thomas	8 February 2003 (age 23)	10	0	(United States Soccer Federation) Corpus Christi
7	FW	Ryan Telfer	4 May 1994 (age 32)	40	10	(Canadian Soccer Association) HFX Wanderers
10	FW	Molik Khan	8 April 2004 (age 22)	11	0	(Turkish Football Federation) Vanspor
11	FW	Levi García	20 November 1997 (age 28)	55	12	(Hellenic Football Federation) Panathinaikos
13	FW	Reon Moore	22 September 1996 (age 30)	37	11	(Trinidad and Tobago Football Association) Defence Force
	FW	Nathaniel James	17 June 2004 (age 22)	23	6	(United States Soccer Federation) North Texas
	FW	Dante Sealy	17 April 2003 (age 23)	11	4	(Canadian Soccer Association) Montréal
	FW	Tyrese Spicer	4 December 2000 (age 25)	11	2	(United States Soccer Federation) Orlando City
	FW	Roald Mitchell	13 January 2003 (age 23)	4	0	(Danish Football Association) Viborg

=== Recent call-ups ===
The following players have been called to the squad in the last twelve months.

Pos.	Player	Date of birth (age)	Caps	Goals	Club	Latest call-up
GK	Teshorne Ragoo	13 November 2002 (age 24)	1	0	(Trinidad and Tobago) Club Sando	v. Russia, 9 June 2026
GK	Marvin Phillip	1 August 1984 (age 42)	97	0	(Trinidad and Tobago) Central	v. Bermuda, 18 November 2025
DF	Andre Raymond	9 November 2000 (age 26)	21	0	(Finland) Ilves	v. Russia, 9 June 2026
DF	Anthony Herbert	18 April 1998 (age 28)	1	0	(United States) Indy Eleven	v. Russia, 9 June 2026
DF	Jaylen Yearwood	27 August 2004 (age 22)	2	0	(United States) Orlando City B	v. South Korea, 30 May 2026
DF	Jacob Greene	23 March 2003 (age 23)	1	0	(United States) Lexington SC	v. South Korea, 30 May 2026
DF	Jerrin Jackie	24 April 2001 (age 25)	8	0	(Oman) Bahla	2026 FIFA Series
DF	Adam Pierre	18 February 2008 (age 18)	2	0	(Trinidad and Tobago) Central	2026 FIFA Series
DF	Isaiah Garcia	22 April 1998 (age 28)	10	0	(Trinidad and Tobago) Defence Force	v. Bermuda, 18 November 2025
MF	John-Paul Rochford	5 January 2000 (age 26)	19	2	(Oman) Al-Khaburah	v. Russia, 9 June 2026
MF	Ali Kazim Nakhid	22 January 2000 (age 26)	1	0	(Kosovo) Ferizaj	v. Russia, 9 June 2026
MF	Duane Muckette	1 July 1995 (age 31)	29	3	(Oman) Sohar	2026 FIFA Series
MF	Steffen Yeates	4 January 2000 (age 26)	13	1	(Canada) York United	v. Bermuda, 18 November 2025
FW	Judah García	24 October 2000 (age 26)	16	3	(Greece) Ilioupoli	v. Russia, 9 June 2026
FW	Isaiah Lee	21 September 1999 (age 27)	15	3	(Trinidad and Tobago) Central	v. Russia, 9 June 2026
FW	Jaheim Faustin	11 November 2004 (age 22)	2	0	(Trinidad and Tobago) San Juan Jabloteh	v. Russia, 9 June 2026
FW	Lindell Sween	27 September 2006 (age 20)	4	0	(Trinidad and Tobago) San Juan Jabloteh	2026 FIFA Series
FW	Kevin Molino	17 June 1990 (age 36)	74	27	(Trinidad and Tobago) Defence Force	v. Bermuda, 18 November 2025
FW	Kaïlé Auvray	27 May 2004 (age 22)	18	0	(Fiji) Bula FC	v. Bermuda, 18 November 2025

== Records ==
As of 18 November 2025
Players in bold are still active with Trinidad and Tobago.

=== Most appearances ===
Rank	Name	Caps	Goals	Career
1	Angus Eve	118	36	1994–2005
2	Stern John	115	70	1995–2011
3	Marvin Andrews	104	10	1996–2009
4	**Joevin Jones**	102	14	2010–present
5	**Marvin Phillip**	101	0	2007–present
6	Densill Theobald	99	2	2002–2013
7	Carlos Edwards	97	4	1999–2017
8	Khaleem Hyland	94	5	2008–2021
9	Daneil Cyrus	91	0	2010–2019
9	Kenwyne Jones	91	23	2003–2017

=== Top goalscorers ===
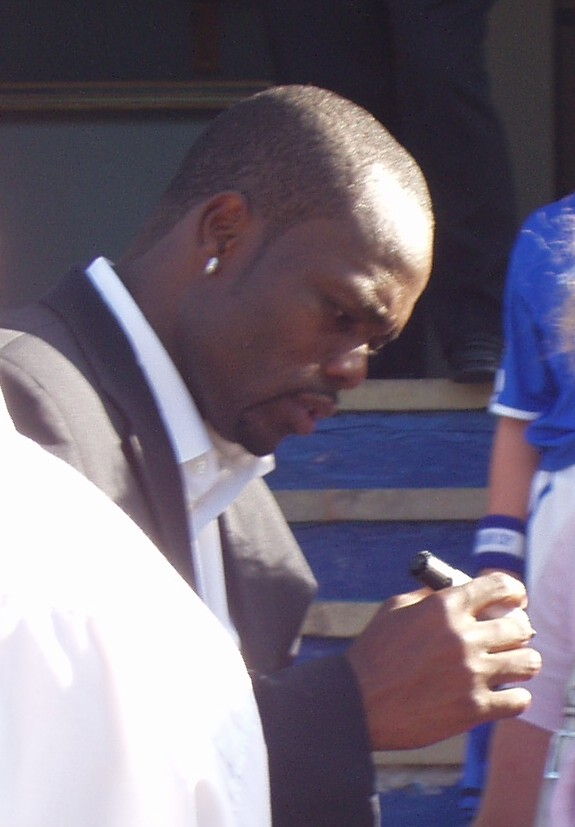
Stern John is Trinidad and Tobago's all time top scorer with 70 goals.

Rank	Name	Goals	Caps	Ratio	Career
1	Stern John	70	115	0.61	1995–2011
2	Angus Eve	36	118	0.31	1994–2005
3	Russell Latapy	29	87	0.33	1987–2009
4	Arnold Dwarika	28	74	0.38	1993–2008
5	**Kevin Molino**	27	75	0.36	2010–present
6	Cornell Glen	24	71	0.34	2002–2017
7	Kenwyne Jones	23	91	0.25	2003–2017
8	Nigel Pierre	22	57	0.39	1999–2005
9	Leonson Lewis	21	31	0.68	1988–1996
10	Dwight Yorke	19	72	0.26	1989–2009

== Competitive record ==
=== FIFA World Cup ===
Trinidad and Tobago first appeared at the 2006 FIFA World Cup. The Soca Warriors finished bottom of the group with one point from the team's three matches. Even though the team did not advance in the competition, Trinidad and Tobago recorded its first point from the FIFA World Cup after a 0–0 draw to Sweden in its first match.

Trinidad and Tobago failed to qualify for the FIFA World Cup between 1966 and 2002, then again from 2010 to 2026.

FIFA World Cup record										Qualification record					
Year	Result	Position	Pld	W	D	L	GF	GA	Squad	Pld	W	D	L	GF	GA
1930 to 1962	Part of United Kingdom									Part of United Kingdom					
(England) 1966	Did not qualify									4	1	0	3	5	12
(Mexico) 1970	Did not qualify									4	1	1	2	4	10
(West Germany) 1974	Did not qualify									9	6	1	2	27	8
(Argentina) 1978	Did not qualify									6	2	2	2	10	9
(Spain) 1982	Did not qualify									4	1	2	1	1	2
(Mexico) 1986	Did not qualify									4	0	1	3	2	7
(Italy) 1990	Did not qualify									12	5	5	2	13	6
(United States) 1994	Did not qualify									4	2	1	1	7	4
(France) 1998	Did not qualify									8	2	1	5	15	10
(South Korea) (Japan) 2002	Did not qualify									22	10	4	8	33	28
(Germany) 2006	Group stage	27th	3	0	1	2	0	4	Squad	20	11	2	7	30	25
(South Africa) 2010	Did not qualify									18	5	5	8	22	30
(Brazil) 2014	Did not qualify									6	4	0	2	12	4
(Russia) 2018	Did not qualify									16	5	2	9	20	28
(Qatar) 2022	Did not qualify									4	2	2	0	6	1
(Canada) (Mexico) (United States) 2026	Did not qualify									10	3	5	2	23	13
(Morocco) (Portugal) (Spain) 2030	To be determined									To be determined					
(Saudi Arabia) 2034	To be determined									To be determined					
Total	Group stage	1/16	3	0	1	2	0	4		151	60	34	57	230	197

FIFA World Cup history
First Match	Trinidad and Tobago 0–0 Sweden (10 June 2006; Dortmund, Germany)
Biggest Win	—
Biggest Defeat	England 2–0 Trinidad and Tobago (15 June 2006; Nuremberg, Germany); Paraguay 2–0 Trinidad and Tobago (20 June 2006; Kaiserslautern, Germany)
Best Result	Group stage (2006)
Worst Result	—

=== CONCACAF Gold Cup ===
CONCACAF Championship 1963–1989, CONCACAF Gold Cup 1991–present

CONCACAF Championship & Gold Cup record										Qualification record					
Year	Result	Position	Pld	W	D	L	GF	GA	Squad	Pld	W	D	L	GF	GA
(El Salvador) 1963	Did not enter									Did not enter					
(Guatemala) 1965	Withdrew									Withdrew					
(Honduras) 1967	Round-robin	4th	5	2	0	3	6	10	Squad	4	2	1	1	7	7
(Costa Rica) 1969	Round-robin	5th	5	1	1	3	4	12	Squad	Qualified automatically					
(Trinidad and Tobago) 1971	Round-robin	5th	5	1	2	2	6	12	Squad	Qualified as hosts					
(Haiti) 1973	Round-robin	2nd	5	3	0	2	11	4	Squad	4	3	1	0	16	4
(Mexico) 1977	Did not qualify									6	2	2	2	10	9
(Honduras) 1981	Did not qualify									4	1	2	1	1	2
1985	Group stage	7th	4	0	1	3	2	7	Squad	Qualified automatically					
1989	Round-robin	3rd	8	3	3	2	7	5	Squad	4	2	2	0	6	1
(United States) 1991	Group stage	5th	3	1	0	2	3	4	Squad	5	3	0	2	12	5
(Mexico) (United States) 1993	Did not qualify									5	2	1	2	10	10
(United States) 1996	Group stage	7th	2	0	0	2	4	6	Squad	5	4	0	1	21	3
(United States) 1998	Group stage	6th	2	1	0	1	5	5	Squad	4	2	1	1	9	3
(United States) 2000	Third place	3rd	4	2	0	2	6	8	Squad	5	4	0	1	18	6
(United States) 2002	Group stage	10th	2	0	1	1	1	2	Squad	5	4	0	1	13	3
(Mexico) (United States) 2003	Did not qualify									7	3	0	4	8	9
(United States) 2005	Group stage	10th	3	0	2	1	3	5	Squad	10	7	0	3	22	8
(United States) 2007	Group stage	11th	3	0	1	2	2	5	Squad	5	3	1	1	13	6
(United States) 2009	Did not qualify									6	3	2	1	11	8
(United States) 2011	Did not qualify									6	4	0	2	13	6
(United States) 2013	Quarter-finals	6th	4	1	1	2	4	5	Squad	11	6	3	2	23	7
(Canada) (United States) 2015	Quarter-finals	5th	4	2	2	0	10	6	Squad	7	5	2	0	16	5
(United States) 2017	Did not qualify									4	1	0	3	8	8
(Costa Rica) (Jamaica) (United States) 2019	Group stage	14th	3	0	1	2	1	9	Squad	Qualified automatically					
(United States) 2021	Group stage	12th	3	0	2	1	1	3	Squad	6	1	3	2	10	11
(Canada) (United States) 2023	Group stage	13th	3	1	0	2	4	10	Squad	6	4	1	1	12	4
(Canada) (United States) 2025	Group stage	11th	3	0	2	1	2	7	Squad	6	3	2	1	11	8
Total	Runners-up	19/28	71	18	19	34	82	125		125	69	22	32	280	133

CONCACAF Championship & Gold Cup history
First Match	Honduras 2–0 Trinidad and Tobago (5 March 1967; Tegucigalpa, Honduras)
Biggest Win	Trinidad and Tobago 4–0 Mexico (14 December 1973; Port-au-Prince, Haiti); Trinidad and Tobago 4–0 Netherlands Antilles (17 December 1973; Port-au-Prince, Haiti)
Biggest Defeat	Trinidad and Tobago 0–6 Haiti (28 November 1971; Port of Spain, Trinidad and Tobago); United States 6–0 Trinidad and Tobago (22 June 2019; Cleveland, United States); United States 6–0 Trinidad and Tobago (2 July 2023; Charlotte, United States)
Best Result	Runners-up (1973)
Worst Result	Group stage (1985, 1991, 1996, 1998, 2002, 2005, 2007, 2019, 2023, 2025)

=== CONCACAF Nations League ===
CONCACAF Nations League record
League / Quarter-finals										Finals								
Season	Division	Group	Pld	W	D	L	GF	GA	P/R	Year	Pos.	Pld	W	D*	L	GF	GA	Squad
2019−20	A	C	4	0	2	2	3	9	▼	(United States) 2020	Did not qualify							
2022–23	B	C	6	4	1	1	12	4	▲	(United States) 2023	Ineligible							
2023–24	A	A	6	4	0	2	12	13	Same position	(United States) 2024	Did not qualify							
2024–25	A	B	4	1	2	1	5	7	Same position	(United States) 2025	Did not qualify							
Total	—	—	20	9	5	6	32	33	—	Total	0 Titles	—	—	—	—	—	—	—

CONCACAF Nations League history
First Match	Martinique 1–1 Trinidad and Tobago (6 September 2019; Fort-de-France, Martinique)
Biggest Win	Trinidad and Tobago 4–1 Saint Vincent and the Grenadines (13 June 2022; Port of Spain, Trinidad and Tobago); Bahamas 0–3 Trinidad and Tobago (24 March 2023; Nassau, Bahamas)
Biggest Defeat	Honduras 4–0 Trinidad and Tobago (17 November 2019; San Pedro Sula, Honduras); Honduras 4–0 Trinidad and Tobago (6 September 2024; Tegucigalpa, Honduras)
Best Result	7th place in 2023–24
Worst Result	16th place in 2022–23

=== Caribbean Cup ===
CFU Championship & Caribbean Cup record									Qualification record					
Year	Result	Pld	W	D	L	GF	GA	Squad	Pld	W	D	L	GF	GA
(Trinidad and Tobago) 1978	Runners-up	3	1	1	1	5	4	Squad	2	1	0	1	6	5
(Suriname) 1979	Fourth place	3	0	0	3	1	6	Squad	2	2	0	0	3	1
(Puerto Rico) 1981	Champions	3	3	0	0	10	0	Squad	6	2	3	1	10	7
(French Guiana) 1983	Runners-up	3	2	0	1	4	4	Squad	Qualified as champions					
(Barbados) 1985	Did not qualify								4	1	2	1	7	4
(Martinique) 1988	Champions	3	2	1	0	7	1	Squad	4	4	0	0	14	1
(Barbados) 1989	Champions	3	2	0	1	5	3	Squad	4	3	0	1	16	4
(Trinidad and Tobago) 1990	Abandoned (Note: Play was suspended when Jamaat al Muslimeen attempted a coup d'état of the government of Trinidad and Tobago. The tournament was abandoned altogether after Tropical storm Arthur forced the cancellation of the final round of games. Trinidad and Tobago were to meet Martinique in the final.)	2	1	1	0	5	0	Squad	Qualified as champions					
(Jamaica) 1991	Runners-up	5	3	0	2	12	5	Squad	Qualified as champions					
(Trinidad and Tobago) 1992	Champions	5	5	0	0	14	2	Squad	Qualified as host					
(Jamaica) 1993	Third place	5	2	1	2	10	10	Squad	Qualified as champions					
(Trinidad and Tobago) 1994	Champions	5	4	1	0	17	4	Squad	Qualified as host					
(Cayman Islands) (Jamaica) 1995	Champions	5	4	0	1	21	3	Squad	Qualified as champions					
(Trinidad and Tobago) 1996	Champions	5	5	0	0	13	2	Squad	Qualified as champions					
(Antigua and Barbuda) (Saint Kitts and Nevis) 1997	Champions	4	2	1	1	9	3	Squad	Qualified as champions					
(Jamaica) (Trinidad and Tobago) 1998	Runners-up	5	4	0	1	18	6	Squad	Qualified as champions					
(Trinidad and Tobago) 1999	Champions	5	5	0	0	19	4	Squad	Qualified as host					
(Trinidad and Tobago) 2001	Champions	5	4	0	1	13	3	Squad	Qualified as champions					
(Barbados) 2005	Third place	3	1	0	2	5	6	Squad	7	6	0	1	17	2
(Trinidad and Tobago) 2007	Runners-up	5	3	1	1	13	6	Squad	Qualified as host					
(Jamaica) 2008	Group stage	3	1	1	1	4	4	Squad	3	2	1	0	7	4
(Martinique) 2010	Group stage	3	1	0	2	1	3	Squad	3	3	0	0	12	3
(Antigua and Barbuda) 2012	Runners-up	5	2	2	1	6	5	Squad	6	5	1	0	20	2
(Jamaica) 2014	Runners-up	4	2	2	0	7	4	Squad	3	3	0	0	9	1
(Martinique) 2017	Did not qualify								4	1	0	3	8	8
Total	23/25	92	59	12	21	219	88		48	33	7	8	129	42

CFU Championship & Caribbean Cup history
First Match	Trinidad and Tobago 3–1 Antigua and Barbuda (23 October 1978; Port of Spain, Trinidad and Tobago)
Biggest Win	Cayman Islands 2–9 Trinidad and Tobago (28 July 1995; Grand Cayman, Cayman Islands)
Biggest Defeat	Suriname 3–0 Trinidad and Tobago (15 November 1979; Paramaribo, Suriname)
Best Result	Champions (1981, 1988, 1989, 1992, 1994, 1995, 1996, 1997, 1999, 2001)
Worst Result	Group stage (2008, 2010)

== Head-to-head records ==
As of 4 October 2026 after match against Curaçao

Opponent	Pld	W	D	L	GF	GA	GD	% Won
Anguilla	2	2	0	0	25	0	+25	100%
Antigua and Barbuda	15	12	1	2	45	14	+31	80%
Argentina	1	0	0	1	0	3	−3	0%
Aruba	2	2	0	0	18	0	+18	100%
Austria	1	0	0	1	1	4	−3	0%
Azerbaijan	2	2	0	0	3	0	+3	100%
Bahamas	4	3	1	0	11	1	+10	75%
Bahrain	2	1	1	0	2	1	+1	50%
Barbados	52	32	14	6	124	42	+82	61.53%
Belize	2	0	2	0	0	0	0	0%
Bermuda	19	9	5	5	37	23	+14	47.36%
Bolivia	2	0	0	2	0	8	–8	0%
Botswana	1	0	1	0	0	0	0	0%
British Virgin Islands	2	2	0	0	6	0	+6	100%
Canada	12	2	2	8	12	18	−6	16.66%
Cayman Islands	3	3	0	0	19	2	+17	100%
Chile	1	0	0	1	0	2	−2	0%
China	2	0	0	2	2	7	−5	0%
Chinese Taipei	1	0	0	1	0	1	−1	0%
Colombia	3	1	0	2	4	8	−4	33.33%
Costa Rica	27	3	4	20	17	57	−40	11.11%
Cuba	32	17	5	10	50	32	+18	53.12%
Curaçao	34	15	9	10	60	45	+15	44.11%
Czech Republic	1	0	0	1	0	3	−3	0%
Dominica	2	2	0	0	13	0	+13	100%
Dominican Republic	11	11	0	0	50	3	+47	100%
Ecuador	2	0	0	2	1	6	−5	0%
Egypt	1	0	0	1	1	2	−1	0%
El Salvador	18	8	4	6	29	21	+8	44.44%
England	2	0	0	2	0	5	−5	0%
Estonia	1	0	0	1	0	1	−1	0%
Finland	6	2	1	3	9	9	0	33.33%
Ghana	1	0	0	1	0	4	–4	0%
French Guiana	8	6	1	1	20	10	+10	75.00%
Grenada	24	15	5	4	60	28	+32	62.50%
Guadeloupe	14	7	5	2	18	10	+8	50%
Guatemala	26	10	8	8	36	42	−6	38.46%
Guyana	73	47	18	8	139	49	+90	64.38%
Haiti	45	19	8	18	74	71	+3	43.18%
Honduras	21	3	6	12	19	39	−20	14.28%
Iceland	1	1	0	0	2	0	+2	100%
India	4	3	0	1	10	2	+8	75%
Iraq	1	1	0	0	2	0	+2	100%
Iran	2	0	0	2	0	3	−2	0%
Jamaica	75	28	15	32	92	93	–1	37.33%
Japan	2	0	1	1	0	2	−2	0%
Jordan	1	0	0	1	0	3	−3	0%
Kenya	1	0	1	0	1	1	0	0%
Kuwait	1	0	1	0	1	1	0	0%
Martinique	34	13	10	11	54	47	+7	38.23%
Mexico	24	3	6	15	22	54	−32	12.50%
Morocco	2	0	0	2	0	3	−3	0%
Montserrat	1	1	0	0	6	1	+5	100%
New Zealand	1	0	1	0	0	0	0	0%
Nicaragua	7	3	2	2	12	7	+5	42.85%
Northern Ireland	1	0	0	1	0	3	−3	0%
Norway	1	1	0	0	3	2	+1	100%
Panama	23	10	6	7	28	22	+6	43.47%
Paraguay	3	0	2	1	3	5	−2	0%
Peru	5	1	1	3	3	11	−8	20%
Puerto Rico	7	5	2	0	33	5	+28	71.42%
Republic of Ireland	1	1	0	0	2	1	+1	100%
Romania	1	0	0	1	0	4	−4	0%
Russia	2	0	0	2	0	5	−5	0%
Saudi Arabia	6	1	1	4	8	11	−3	16.67%
Scotland	1	0	0	1	1	4	−3	0%
Slovenia	1	0	0	1	1	3	−2	0%
South Africa	2	1	0	1	3	2	+1	50%
Saint Kitts and Nevis	18	16	0	2	51	17	+33	88.89%
Saint Martin	1	1	0	0	2	0	+2	100%
Saint Lucia	6	3	1	2	12	4	+8	50%
Saint Vincent and the Grenadines	18	12	2	4	48	16	+32	66.66%
South Korea	2	0	1	1	1	6	–5	0%
Suriname	53	18	15	20	85	87	−2	33.96%
Sweden	2	0	1	1	0	5	−5	0%
Thailand	2	0	0	2	2	4	−2	0%
United Arab Emirates	2	1	1	0	5	3	+2	50%
United States	34	4	4	26	16	76	−60	11.76%
Uruguay	1	0	0	1	1	3	−2	0%
Venezuela	6	0	3	3	3	11	−8	0%
Wales	2	0	0	2	1	3	−2	0%
Total	835	364	178	293	1,416	1,099	+327	43.59%

== Honours ==
=== Continental ===
- CONCACAF Championship
  - (silver) Runners-up (1): 1973
  - (bronze) Third place (1): 1989

=== Subcontinental / Regional ===
- CFU Championship / Caribbean Cup
  - (gold) Champions (10): 1981, 1988, 1989, 1992, 1994, 1995, 1996, 1997, 1999, 2001
  - (silver) Runners-up (7): 1978, 1983, 1991, 1998, 2007, 2012, 2014
  - (bronze) Third place (2): 1993, 2005
- Central American and Caribbean Games
  - (silver) Silver medal (1): 1974

=== Friendly / Unofficial ===
- Martinez Shield (5): 1923, 1925, 1926, 1928, 1933

=== Summary ===
Honours in competitions directly organized or recognized by FIFA or an affiliated confederation.

Competition	1st place, gold medalist(s)	2nd place, silver medalist(s)	3rd place, bronze medalist(s)	Total
CONCACAF Championship	0	1	1	2
Total	0	1	1	2

== FIFA World Ranking ==
Last update was on 23 December 2021 Source:

Best Ranking Worst Ranking Best Mover Worst Mover

Trinidad & Tobago's FIFA World Ranking History
Rank	Year	Best		Worst	
Rank	Year	Rank	Move	Rank	Move
103	2021	100	▲3	103	Steady
103	2020	103	▲2	105	▼1
104	2019	92	▲1	104	▼9
92	2018	79	▲7	93	▼13
87	2017	76	▲16	99	▼16
78	2016	49	▲6	78	▼13
49	2015	49	▲8	67	▼7
55	2014	49	▲37	86	▼13
78	2013	69	▲9	87	▼12
68	2012	68	▲11	85	▼7
76	2011	76	▲11	95	▼7
89	2010	76	▲28	106	▼21
82	2009	63	▲7	82	▼9
77	2008	77	▲12	102	▼20
81	2007	63	▲19	87	▼14
91	2006	47	▲5	91	▼24
50	2005	50	▲5	62	▼3
63	2004	63	▲14	77	▼7
70	2003	47	▲1	71	▼12
47	2002	34	▲3	47	▼7
32	2001	25	▲11	36	▼5
29	2000	29	▲9	49	▼4
44	1999	40	▲11	72	▼17
51	1998	44	▲12	59	▼11
56	1997	42	▲13	74	▼18
41	1996	33	▲15	50	▼4
57	1995	55	▲27	85	▼28
91	1994	83	▲10	95	▼5
88	1993	85	▲1	89	▼23

== See also ==
- Football in Trinidad and Tobago
- Trinidad and Tobago Football Association
- Trinidad and Tobago national under-20 football team
- Trinidad and Tobago national under-17 football team
- TT Premier Football League
- Trinidad and Tobago football league system
- Trinidad and Tobago at the FIFA World Cup
- Trinidad and Tobago at the CONCACAF Gold Cup
