= Stade Louis Achille =

Stadium in Fort-de-France, Martinique

Coordinates: 14°36′10″N 61°05′03″W

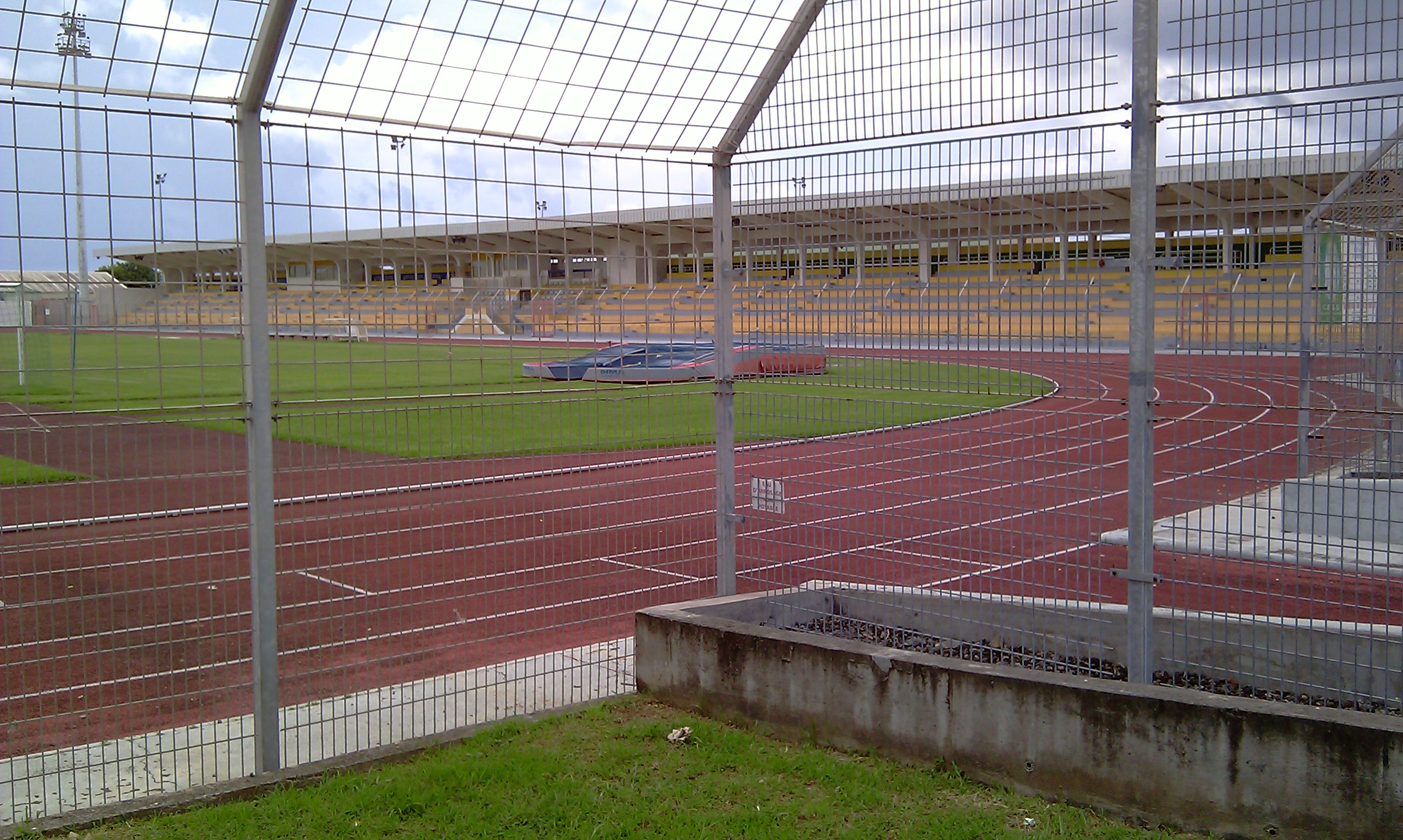
Stade louis achille

Stade Louis Achille is a multi-use stadium in Fort-de-France, Martinique. It is currently used mostly for football matches and hosts the home games of Good Luck. The stadium holds 9,000 people.
