= Arnos Vale Stadium =

Cricket ground in Arnos Vale, St. Vincent

Coordinates: 13°8′30.7″N 61°12′42.5″W

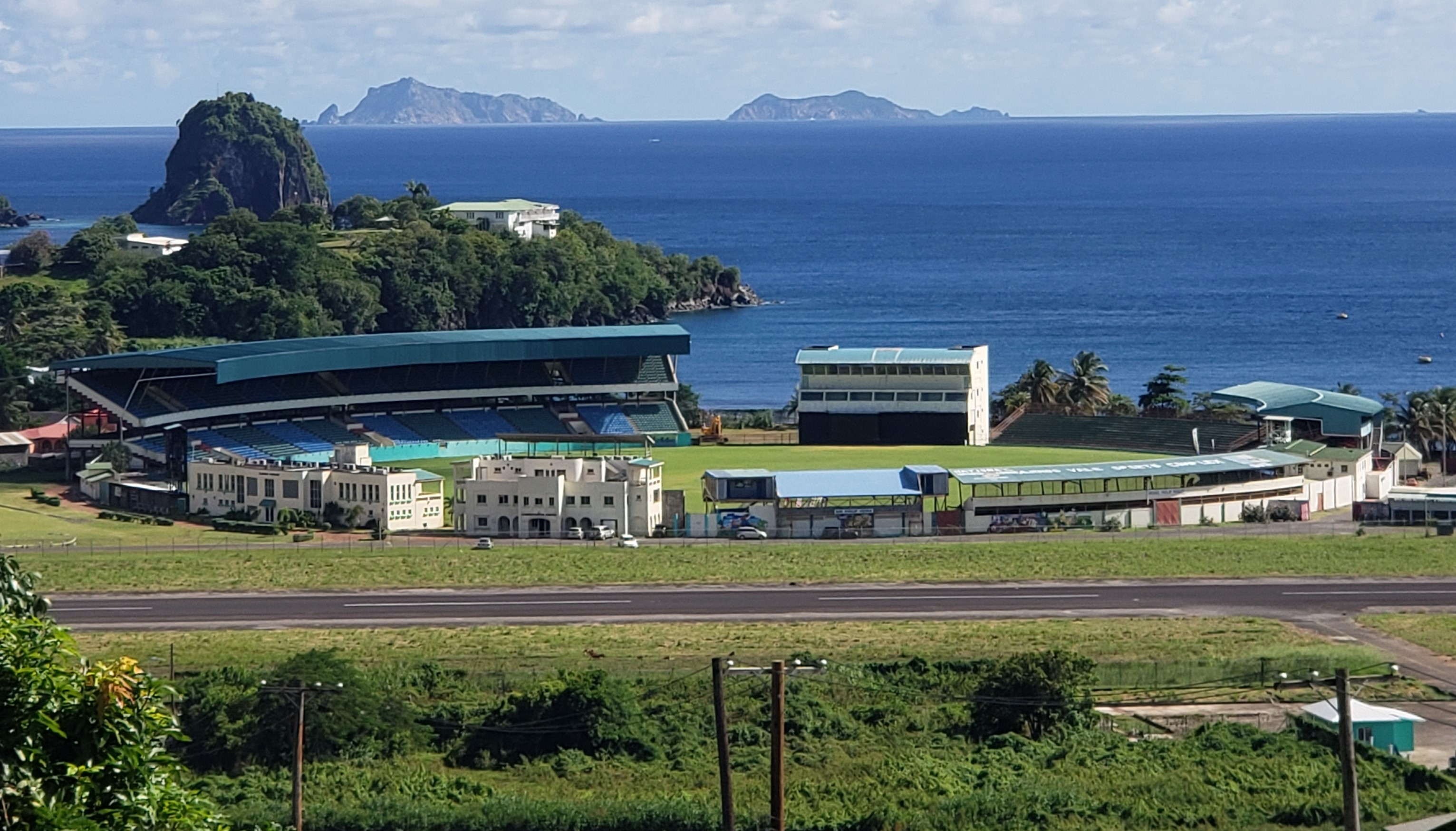
- Interactive map of Arnos Vale Stadium

Ground information
- Location: Arnos Vale, St. Vincent
- Capacity: 18,000
- Owner: Windward Islands Cricket Board
- End names
- Airport End; Bequia End

International information
- First men's Test: 20–24 June 1997: West Indies v Sri Lanka
- Last men's Test: 5–9 September 2014: West Indies v Bangladesh
- First men's ODI: 4 February 1981: West Indies v England
- Last men's ODI: 20 March 2012: West Indies v Australia
- First men's T20I: 27 July 2013: West Indies v Pakistan
- Last men's T20I: 19 December 2024: West Indies v Bangladesh
- First women's ODI: 13 March 2003: West Indies v Sri Lanka
- Last women's ODI: 3 September 2011: West Indies v Pakistan
- First women's T20I: 27 July 2013: West Indies v Pakistan
- Last women's T20I: 28 July 2013: West Indies v Pakistan

Team information
Windward Islands	(1972–present)
- As of 1 September 2020; Source: Cricinfo

The Arnos Vale Stadium is a cricket ground in Arnos Vale, near Kingstown, St. Vincent. The multi-use ground – part of Arnos Vale Sports Complex – is situated next to and to the west of the Arnos Vale Playing Field. (Note: The sports complex itself is located just south of the site of the former E. T. Joshua Airport.)

The stadium holds the capacity to accommodate 18,000 people and is mostly used for football and cricket matches.

== History ==
The stadium hosted its first ever international game on 4 February 1981. The match was an ODI between West Indies and England and was a close encounter which the hosts won by two runs.

The ground's maiden Test match came in 1997, when the West Indies played Sri Lanka to a draw, with Sri Lanka finishing on 233–8 chasing a target of 269 runs. The second Test held at the ground, in 2009, saw Bangladesh record their maiden Test victory over the West Indies by 95 runs. At the time the West Indies were without many of their leading players due to a dispute with the West Indies Cricket Board, so seven Test debutantes featured in the West Indian team.

Ahead of the 2007 Cricket World Cup, hosted by the West Indies, Arnos Vale Sports Complex was renovated over a period of 18 months. The ground's playing area was enlarged, and on the eastern side of the ground a new stand, media centre, operations centre, and pavilion were constructed.

== International centuries ==
There have been four Test and two ODI centuries scored at the venue.

=== Test centuries ===
Score	Player	Team	Opposing team	Date
115	Brian Lara	West Indies	Sri Lanka	20 June 1997
128	Tamim Iqbal	Bangladesh	West Indies	9 July 2009
212	Kraigg Brathwaite	West Indies	Bangladesh	5 September 2014
116	Mushfiqur Rahim	Bangladesh	West Indies	5 September 2014

=== ODI centuries ===
Score	Player	Team	Opposing team	Date
104	Brian Lara	West Indies	New Zealand	6 April 1996
103 not out	Phil Simmons	West Indies	New Zealand	6 April 1996

== 2024 ICC Men's T20 World Cup matches ==
13 June 2024
10:30 UTC−4
Scorecard

Bangladesh; 159/5 (20 overs)	v	Netherlands; 134/8 (20 overs)
Shakib Al Hasan 64* (46); Paul van Meekeren 2/15 (4 overs)		Sybrand Engelbrecht 33 (22); Rishad Hossain 3/33 (4 overs)

Bangladesh won by 25 runs
Arnos Vale Stadium, Kingstown
Umpires: Chris Brown (NZ) and Jayaraman Madanagopal (Ind)
Player of the match: Shakib Al Hasan (Ban)

- Netherlands won the toss and elected to field.
- Sri Lanka were eliminated as a result of this match.

14 June 2024
19:30 UTC−4 (N)
Scorecard

South Africa; 115/7 (20 overs)	v	Nepal; 114/7 (20 overs)
Reeza Hendricks 43 (49); Kushal Bhurtel 4/19 (4 overs)		Aasif Sheikh 42 (49); Tabraiz Shamsi 4/19 (4 overs)

South Africa won by 1 run
Arnos Vale Stadium, Kingstown
Umpires: Jayaraman Madanagopal (Ind) and Joel Wilson (WI)
Player of the match: Tabraiz Shamsi (SA)

- Nepal won the toss and elected to field.
- Nepal were eliminated as a result of this match.

16 June 2024
19:30 UTC−4 (N)
Scorecard

Bangladesh; 106 (19.3 overs)	v	Nepal; 85 (19.2 overs)
Shakib Al Hasan 17 (22); Sompal Kami 2/10 (3 overs)		Kushal Malla 27 (40); Tanzim Hasan Sakib 4/7 (4 overs)

Bangladesh won by 21 runs
Arnos Vale Stadium, Kingstown
Umpires: Sam Nogajski (Aus) and Ahsan Raza (Pak)
Player of the match: Tanzim Hasan Sakib (Ban)

- Nepal won the toss and elected to field.
- Sandeep Lamichhane (Nep) took his 100th wicket in T20Is.
- Bangladesh qualified for the Super 8 while Netherlands were eliminated as a result of this match.

=== Super 8s ===
22 June 2024
20:30 UTC−4 (N)
Scorecard

Afghanistan; 148/6 (20 overs)	v	Australia; 127 (19.2 overs)
Rahmanullah Gurbaz 60 (49); Pat Cummins 3/28 (4 overs)		Glenn Maxwell 59 (41); Gulbadin Naib 4/20 (4 overs)

Afghanistan won by 21 runs
Arnos Vale Stadium, Kingstown
Umpires: Kumar Dharmasena (SL) and Ahsan Raza (Pak)
Player of the match: Gulbadin Naib (Afg)

- Australia won the toss and elected to field.
- Pat Cummins (Aus) took his second consecutive hat-trick in T20Is and became the only player to take more than one hat-tricks in T20 World Cup. This was the second hat-trick of the tournament overall and the eighth in the history of the T20 World Cup.
- This was Afganistan's first win against Australia in T20Is.

24 June 2024
20:30 UTC−4 (N)
Scorecard

Afghanistan; 115/5 (20 overs)	v	Bangladesh; 105 (17.5 overs)
Rahmanullah Gurbaz 43 (55); Rishad Hossain 3/26 (4 overs)		Liton Das 54* (49); Rashid Khan 4/23 (4 overs)

Afghanistan won by 8 runs (DLS method)
Arnos Vale Stadium, Kingstown
Umpires: Nitin Menon (Ind) and Langton Rusere (Zim)
Player of the match: Naveen-ul-Haq (Afg)

- Afghanistan won the toss and elected to bat.
- Bangladesh were set a revised target of 114 runs off 19 overs due to rain.
- Rashid Khan (Afg) took his 150th wicket in T20Is.
- Afghanistan qualified for the semi-finals while Australia and Bangladesh were eliminated as a result of this match.
- This was Afghanistan's first win against Bangladesh in T20 World Cup.
- Afghanistan qualified for the semi-finals of any major ICC Tournament for the first time in their cricketing history.

== List of five-wicket hauls ==
There have been 12 five-wicket hauls in international cricket on the ground.

=== Test matches ===
Five-wicket hauls in Men's Test matches at Arnos Vale
Bowler	Date	Team	Opposing Team	Figures	Result
Ravindra Pushpakumara (Note: Pushpakumara, Hooper and Muralitharan took their five-wicket hauls in the same match.)	20 June 1997	Sri Lanka	West Indies	5/41	Drawn
Carl Hooper	20 June 1997	West Indies	Sri Lanka	5/26	Drawn
Muttiah Muralitharan	20 June 1997	Sri Lanka	West Indies	5/113	Drawn
Darren Sammy (Note: Sammy and Mahmudullah took their five-wicket hauls in the same match.)	9 July 2009	West Indies	Bangladesh	5/70	Bangladesh won
Mahmudullah	9 July 2009	Bangladesh	West Indies	5/51	Bangladesh won
Taijul Islam (Note: Taijul Islam and Benn took their five-wicket hauls in the same match.)	5 September 2014	Bangladesh	West Indies	5/135	West Indies won
Sulieman Benn	5 September 2014	West Indies	Bangladesh	5/39	West Indies won

=== One Day Internationals ===
Five-wicket hauls in Men's ODI matches at Arnos Vale
Bowler	Date	Team	Opposing team	Figures	Result
Colin Croft	4 February 1981	West Indies	England	6/15	West Indies won
Franklyn Rose	12 April 2000	West Indies	Pakistan	5/23	West Indies won

Five-wicket hauls in Women's ODI matches at Arnos Vale
Bowler	Date	Team	Opposing team	Figures	Result
Sandamali Dolawatte	22 March 2003	Sri Lanka	West Indies	5/16	Sri Lanka won
Anisa Mohammed	28 August 2011	West Indies	Pakistan	5/5	West Indies won
Anisa Mohammed	30 August 2011	West Indies	Pakistan	5/7	West Indies won

== Upcoming Uses of the Stadium ==
14 November 2026 2026-27 CONCACAF Nations League B	Saint Vincent and the Grenadines	v	Belize
8:00 (Local Time)

== See also ==
- List of Test cricket grounds
