= Arnos Vale, Saint Vincent and the Grenadines =

Arnos Vale
- Location in Saint Vincent and the Grenadines
- Coordinates: 13°08′33″N 061°12′34″W
- Country: Saint Vincent and the Grenadines
- Island: Saint Vincent
- Parish: Saint George

Arnos Vale is a former agricultural estate and now a settlement in Greathead Bay, formerly Warrawarrou Bay, in southern Saint Vincent, in Saint Vincent and the Grenadines. It is centred 5 kilometres (3.1 miles) southeast of the capital, Kingstown. The country's former main airport, E. T. Joshua Airport occupied part of the area, and used to be called Arnos Vale Airport. The area is mainly green and has a coastline to the south. As to the traditional parishes of the island, determining the local forerunner church and present local body, it lies in the parish of Saint George, which contains the capital and about half of the island's population. It is one of five parishes on the main island.

The town hosts a 18,000-seat cricket and football stadium at the Arnos Vale Sports Complex.

The relocation of airport to Argyle has led the government to indicate willingness to transform the former airport into a residential area.

== History ==
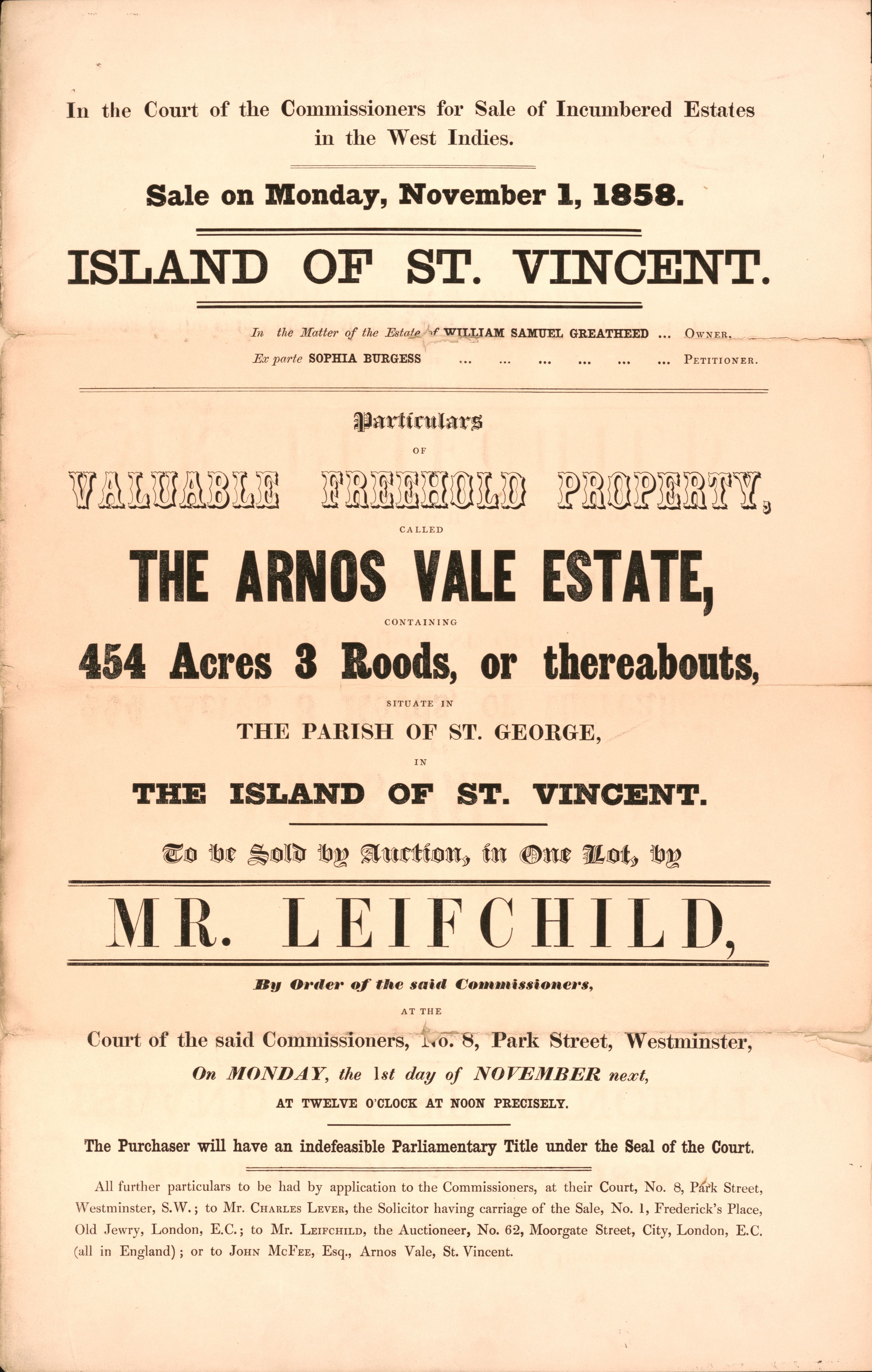
Sale particulars for Arnos Vale Estate, 1858.

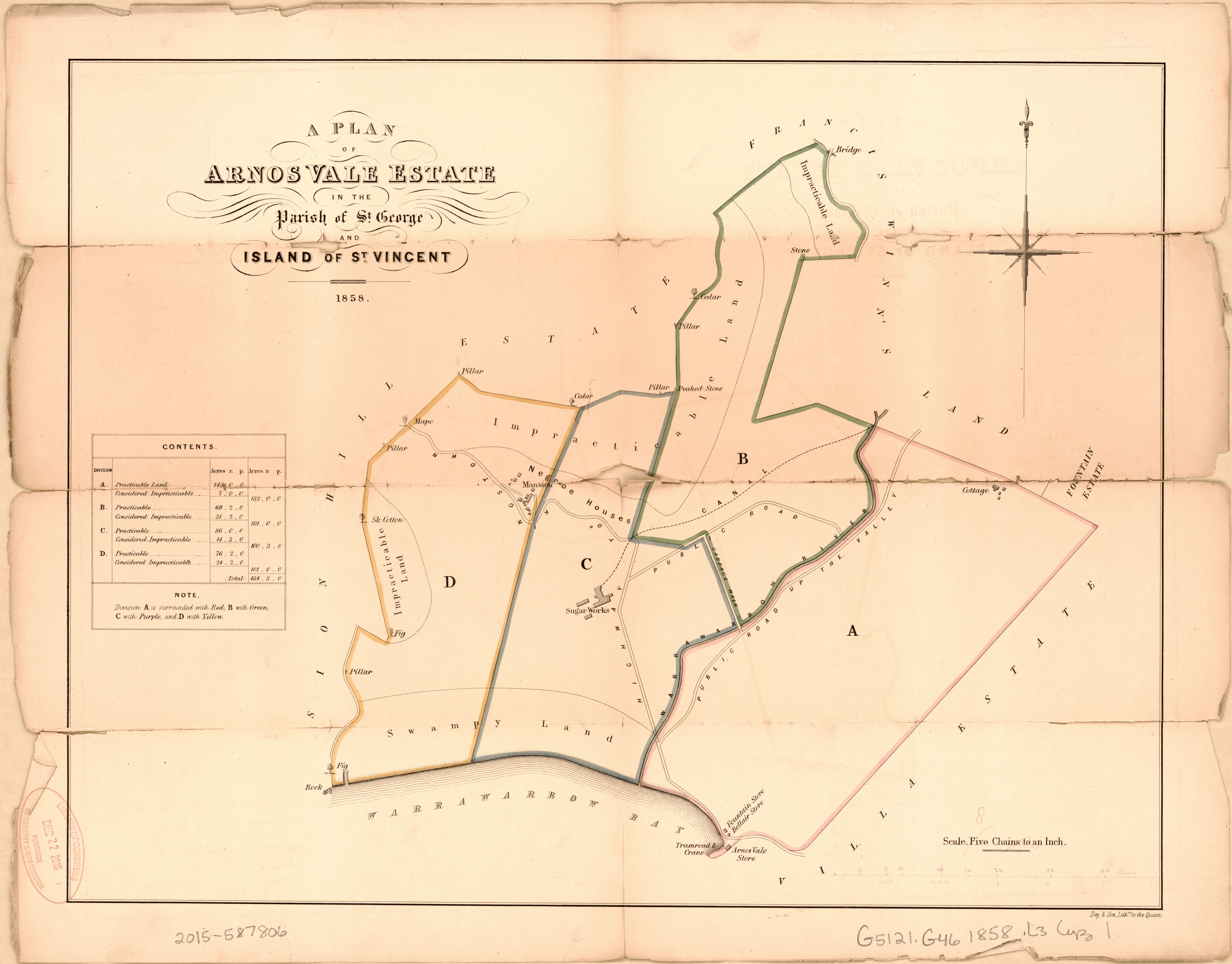
1858 map of Arnos Vale Estate, Saint Vincent, prepared as part of the auction.

During the mid-nineteenth century, following the fall-out of the abolition of slavery in St Vincent and the reduction in value and investment in estates, the British parliament passed a series of Acts – the West Indian Incumbered Estates Acts – to provide clear title to estates and to enable their comprehensive re-planning if the new owners, whether local or abroad, so desired without fear of hindrance from objections from either side of the Atlantic, such as adjoining owners or those with interests in historic trusts. The Arnos Vale Estate - then 454-acre (184 ha) - was sold on 1 November 1858, four years after the first such Act and was the first estate to be subjected to the clear title mechanism which the series of Acts created.

The buyer was Rev. F. R. Braithwaite of St Kitts for £10,050, a sum that Reginald Cust, commissioner and historian of the legislation, noted was much higher than expected. The Estate, including Arnos Vale Great House was then bought in 1893 from Rev. Braithwaite by George Richard Correia (later Corea), son of Joachim Correia one of the first Portuguese indentured labourers who came from Madeira to St Vincent in the 1840s.
