= List of Antalyaspor managers =

This is a list of all managers of Antalyaspor, including honours.

== Managers ==
Managers (Note: Managers since 1981)	Nationality	From	Until	Notes
Kadir Giderler	Turkey	1981	1982	1 TFF First League champions
Valeriu Neagu	Romania	1982	1983	First non-Turkish manager
Orhan Gülmez	Turkey	1983	1983	
Peter Stubbe	Germany	1983	1983	
Ali Rıza Şenol	Turkey	1983	1983	Short-term manager
Yılmaz Gökdel	Turkey	1983	1984	
Ali Rıza Şenol	Turkey	1984	1984	
Orhan Gülmez	Turkey	1984	1984	Short-term manager
Zeynel Soyuer	Turkey	1984	1985	
Adnan Dinçer	Turkey	1985	1986	1 TFF First League champions
Yılmaz Gökdel	Turkey	1986	1988	
Yılmaz Vural	Turkey	1988	1989	
Adnan Dinçer	Turkey	1992	1993	
Erdem Tuğal	Turkey	1993	1994	
Adnan Dinçer	Turkey	1994	1994	
Ahmet Akçan	Turkey	1994	1995	
Ümit Kayıhan	Turkey	1996	1997	
Metin Ünal	Turkey	1997	1997	
Şenol Güneş	Turkey	1997	1998	
Jozef Jarabinský	Slovakia	1998	1999	
Rüdiger Abramczik	Germany	1999	2000	1 Turkish Cup Final
Metin Ünal	Turkey	2000	2001	
Cezmi Turhan	Turkey	2001	2001	
Hüseyin Kalpar	Turkey	2001	2001	
Mehmet Ali Öztürk	Turkey	2001	2001	Short-term manager
Giray Bulak	Turkey	2001	2002	
Adnan Dinçer	Turkey	2002	2002	
Tarık Söyleyici	Turkey	2002	2003	
Coşkun Demirbakan	Turkey	2003	2004	
Metin Türel	Turkey	2004	2005	
Adnan Gülek	Turkey	2005	2005	Short-term manager
Yılmaz Vural	Turkey	2005	2007	
Ümit Turmuş	Turkey	2007	2007	
Raşit Çetiner	Turkey	2007	2008	
Hikmet Karaman	Turkey	2008	2008	
Jozef Jarabinský	Slovakia	2008	2008	
Mehmet Özdilek	Turkey	2008	2013	
Samet Aybaba	Turkey	2013	2014	
Fuat Çapa	Turkey	2014	2014	
Engin Korukır	Turkey	2014	2014	
Hami Mandıralı	Turkey	2014	2015	
Yusuf Şimşek	Turkey	2015	2015	
José Morais	Portugal	2015	2016	
Rıza Çalımbay	Turkey	2016	2017	
Leonardo	Brazil	2017	2017	
Hamza Hamzaoğlu	Turkey	2018	2018	
Bülent Korkmaz	Turkey	2018	2019	
Stjepan Tomas	Croatia	2019	2019	
Tamer Tuna	Turkey	2020	2020	
Ersun Yanal	Turkey	2020	2021	
Nuri Şahin	Turkey	2021	2023	
Sergen Yalçın	Turkey	2024	2024	
Alex De Souza	Brazil	2024	-	
