= Wilde-Donald Guerrier =

Haitian footballer (born 1989)

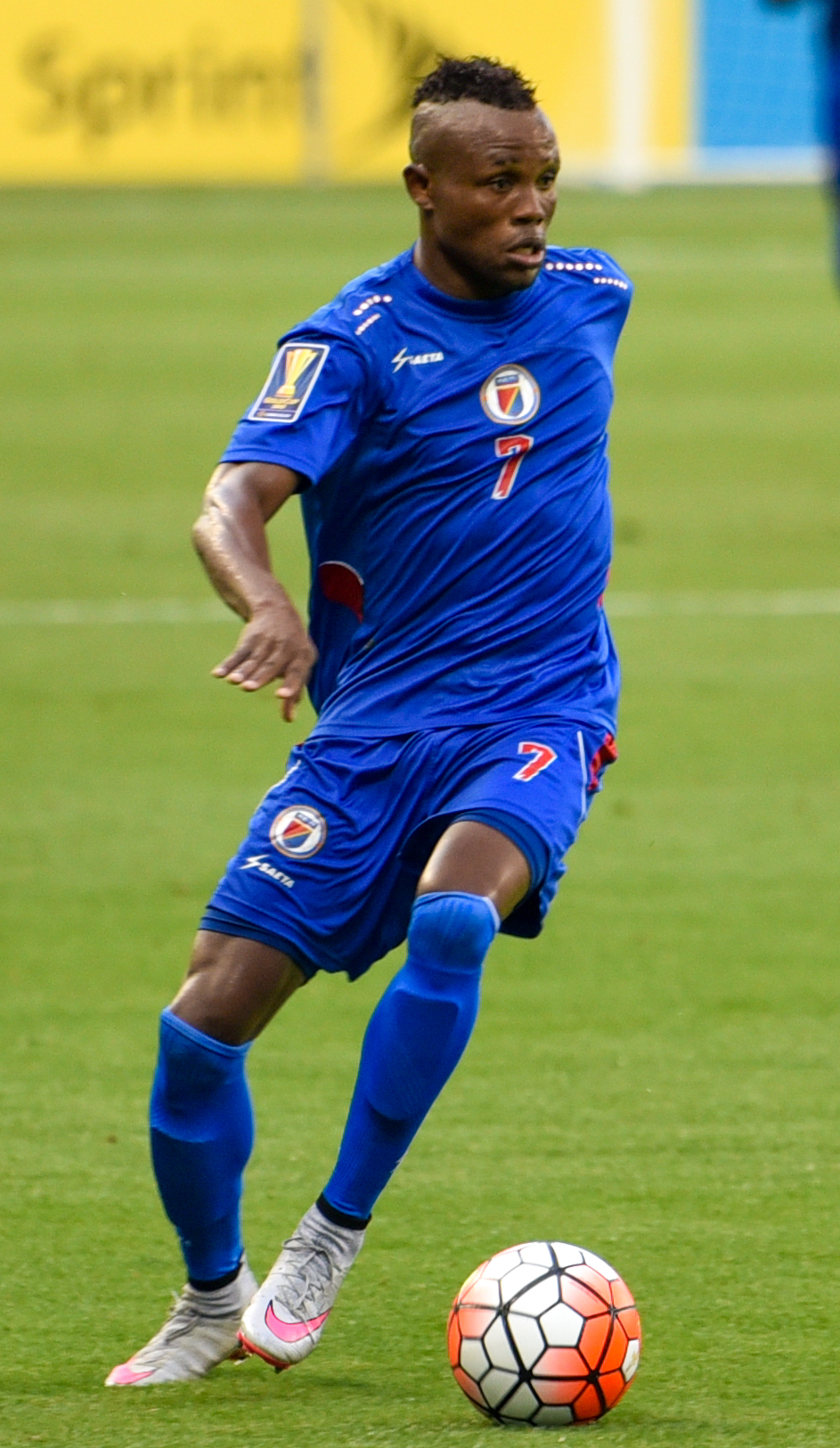
- Guerrier in 2015

Personal information
- Date of birth: 31 March 1989 (age 37)
- Place of birth: Port-à-Piment, Haiti
- Height: 1.80 m (5 ft 11 in)
- Positions: Left winger; left-back

Team information
- Current team: Wolni Kłaj

Senior career*
Years	Team	Apps	(Gls)
2009–2011	Violette AC	45	(14)
2011–2013	América des Cayes	77	(26)
2013–2016	Wisła Kraków	75	(20)
2016–2017	Alanyaspor	24	(4)
2017–2019	Qarabağ	35	(2)
2019–2020	Neftçi	13	(1)
2020–2021	Qarabağ	8	(4)
2021	Apollon Limassol	9	(4)
2021–2022	Wieczysta Kraków	5	(3)
2022–2023	Olympiakos Nicosia	14	(3)
2023	Zira	10	(0)
2023	Panevėžys	0	(0)
2024–2025	FC Cosmos Koblenz	28	(7)
2025–2026	Hutnik Kraków	16	(1)
2026–	Wolni Kłaj	0	(0)

International career
2010–2023	Haiti	61	(11)
- * Club domestic league appearances and goals as of 17:31, 5 July 2026 (UTC)

Wilde-Donald Guerrier (born 31 March 1989) is a Haitian footballer who plays as a left winger or left-back for Polish regional league club Wolni Kłaj. Besides Poland, he has played abroad in Turkey, Azerbaijan, Cyprus, Lithuania and Germany.

== Club career ==
=== Haiti ===
Guerrier started his career in Haiti for Violette AC. After being relegated to the second division, he decided to leave the club for a first division team, which led him to América des Cayes.

=== Qarabağ ===
On 6 July 2017, Guerrier signed a two-year contract with Azerbaijani club Qarabağ.

He appeared in all of Qarabağ's six 2017–18 Champions League qualifiers, as they became the first team from Azerbaijan to reach the group stage of the competition.

On 16 July 2019, Guerrier left Qarabağ.

=== Neftçi PFK ===
On 5 September 2019, Guerrier signed a one-year contract with Neftçi PFK. On 1 June 2020, Neftçi announced that he had left the club after his contract expired.

=== Return to Qarabağ ===
On 2 July 2020, Qarabağ announced the return of Guerrier from Neftçi. On 31 January 2021, he left Qarabağ by mutual consent.

=== Later career ===
In November 2021, Guerrier joined Wieczysta Kraków of the IV liga, the Polish fifth tier, joining up with Franciszek Smuda, his former manager at Wisła Kraków. He signed a contract until the end of the season with the option for a further season.

In August 2022 he signed a one-year contract with Cypriot top-tier club Olympiakos Nicosia.

On 29 January 2023, Zira announced the signing of Guerrier to a six-month contract, with the option of an additional year, from Olympiakos Nicosia. On 14 June 2023, Zira announced his departure.

Guerrier moved to German club FC Cosmos Koblenz, playing in the sixth-tier Rheinlandliga, in July 2024.

On 11 September 2025, Guerrier moved back to Kraków to join II liga side Hutnik Kraków. He announced his retirement from professional football at the end of the 2025–26 season.

On 4 July 2026, Polish seventh tier club Wolni Kłaj announced Guerrier would be joining them for the following season.

== International career ==
Guerrier made his debut for the Haiti national team in 2010. He scored his first goal on 6 September 2011, the third of a 4–2 victory over Curaçao.

== Career statistics ==
=== Club ===
As of match played 30 May 2026

Appearances and goals by club, season and competition
Club	Season	League			National cup (Note: Includes Polish Cup, Turkish Cup, Azerbaijan Cup)		Continental		Other		Total	
Club	Season	Division	Apps	Goals	Apps	Goals	Apps	Goals	Apps	Goals	Apps	Goals
Wisła Kraków	2013–14	Ekstraklasa	30	7	1	0	—		—		31	7
Wisła Kraków	2014–15	Ekstraklasa	23	6	1	0	—		—		24	6
Wisła Kraków	2015–16	Ekstraklasa	22	7	0	0	—		—		22	7
Wisła Kraków	Total		75	20	2	0	—		—		77	20
Alanyaspor	2016–17	Süper Lig	24	4	1	0	—		—		25	4
Qarabağ	2017–18	Azerbaijan Premier League	15	1	3	0	12 (Note: Appearances in UEFA Champions League)	2	—		30	3
Qarabağ	2018–19	Azerbaijan Premier League	20	1	4	0	13 (Note: Six appearances and one goal in UEFA Champions League, seven appearances and one goal in UEFA Europa League)	2	—		37	3
Qarabağ	Total		35	2	7	0	25	4	—		67	6
Neftçi	2019–20	Azerbaijan Premier League	13	1	1	0	—		—		14	1
Qarabağ	2020–21	Azerbaijan Premier League	8	4	0	0	8 (Note: Three appearances and two goals in UEFA Champions League, five appearances in UEFA Europa League)	2	—		16	6
Apollon Limassol	2020–21	Cypriot First Division	9	4	—		—		—		9	4
Wieczysta Kraków	2021–22	IV liga Lesser Poland West	5	3	—		—		—		5	3
Olympiakos Nicosia	2022–23	Cypriot First Division	14	3	0	0	—		—		14	3
Zira	2022–23	Azerbaijan Premier League	10	0	—		—		—		10	0
Panevėžys	2023	A Lyga	0	0	—		—		—		0	0
FC Cosmos Koblenz	2024–25	Rheinlandliga	28	7	—		—		1 (Note: Appearance in Rhineland Cup)	0	29	7
Hutnik Kraków	2025–26	II liga	16	1	2	0	—		—		18	1
Wolni Kłaj	2026–27	Regional league	0	0	—		—		—		0	0
Career total			237	49	13	0	33	6	1	0	284	55

=== International ===
Appearances and goals by national team and year
National team	Year	Apps	Goals
Haiti
Haiti	2010	4	0
Haiti	2011	5	1
Haiti	2013	7	1
Haiti	2014	9	3
Haiti	2015	9	2
Haiti	2016	6	1
Haiti	2017	3	1
Haiti	2018	2	0
Haiti	2019	9	2
Haiti	2021	3	0
Haiti	2022	1	0
Haiti	2023	3	0
Total		61	11

Scores and results list Haiti's goal tally first, score column indicates score after each Guerrier goal.

List of international goals scored by Wilde-Donald Guerrier
No.	Date	Venue	Opponent	Score	Result	Competition
1	6 September 2011	Ergilio Hato Stadium, Willemstad, Curaçao	Curaçao	3–2	4–2	2014 FIFA World Cup qualification
2	8 June 2013	Sun Life Stadium, Miami Gardens, United States	Spain	1–2	1–2	Friendly
3	10 October 2014	Stade Sylvio Cator, Port-au-Prince, Haiti	Barbados	2–0	4–2	2014 Caribbean Cup qualification
4	14 November 2014	Montego Bay Sports Complex, Montego Bay, Jamaica	Martinique	1–0	3–0	2014 Caribbean Cup
5	18 November 2014	Montego Bay Sports Complex, Montego Bay, Jamaica	Cuba	2–0	2–1	2014 Caribbean Cup
6	27 March 2015	Helong Stadium, Changsha, China	China	2–1	2–2	Friendly
7	8 September 2015	Stade Sylvio Cator, Port-au-Prince, Haiti	Grenada	1–0	3–0	2018 FIFA World Cup qualification
8	29 May 2016	Marlins Park, Miami, United States	Colombia	1–1	1–3	Friendly
9	24 March 2017	Stade Sylvio Cator, Port-au-Prince, Haiti	Nicaragua	2–0	3–1	2017 CONCACAF Gold Cup qualification
10	11 June 2019	Centro de Alto Rendimiento, Alajuela, Costa Rica	Guyana	2–0	3–1	Friendly
11	29 June 2019	NRG Stadium, Houston, United States	Canada	3–2	3–2	2019 CONCACAF Gold Cup

== Honors ==
Qarabağ

- Azerbaijan Premier League: 2017–18, 2018–19

Wieczysta Kraków

- IV liga Lesser Poland West: 2021–22
- Polish Cup (Lesser Poland regionals): 2021–22

Individual

- CONCACAF Best XI: 2017
