= FC Cosmos Koblenz =

Cosmos Koblenz
- Full name: Fußball-Club Cosmos Koblenz 2007 e. V.
- Short name: Cosmos Koblenz
- Founded: 5 June 2007; 19 years ago
- Ground: Stadion Oberwerth
- Capacity: 9,500
- President: Skender Xhakaliu
- Head coach: Yusuf Kasal
- League: Oberliga Rheinland-Pfalz/Saar (V)
- 2025–26: Oberliga Rheinland-Pfalz/Saar, 10th of 18
- Website: fccosmos.de
Home colours	Away colours

Fußball-Club Cosmos Koblenz 2007 e. V., commonly known as FC Cosmos Koblenz, or simply Cosmos Koblenz, is a German association football club based in Koblenz, Rhineland-Palatinate. The club competes in the Oberliga Rheinland-Pfalz/Saar, the fifth tier of the German football league system.

== History ==
The club was founded on 5 June 2007 in the Koblenz district of Bubenheim.

Cosmos Koblenz achieved promotion from the Bezirksliga Mitte to the Rheinlandliga at the end of the 2021–22 season. In their first Rheinlandliga campaign, the club finished second behind fellow promoted side Bitburg, qualifying for the promotion play-offs to the Oberliga Rheinland-Pfalz/Saar. Cosmos secured promotion after victories over TuS Marienborn and Rot-Weiß Hasborn-Dautweiler.

After one season in the Oberliga, the club was relegated back to the Rheinlandliga. Cosmos won the Rheinlandliga title in the 2024–25 season and returned to the Oberliga Rheinland-Pfalz/Saar for the 2025–26 campaign.

== Stadium ==
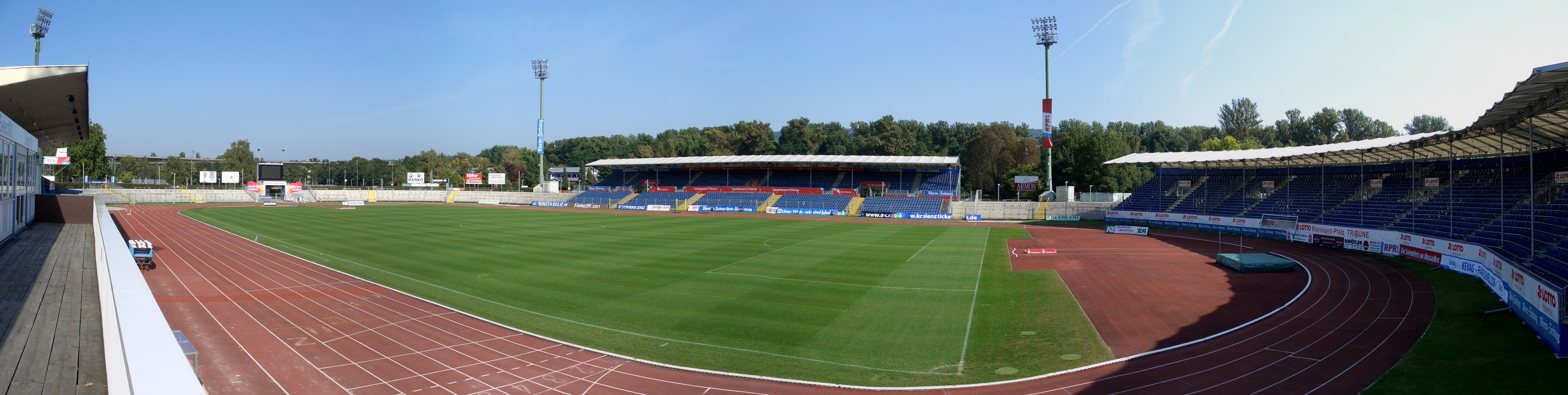
Stadion Oberwerth

Since July 2025, Cosmos Koblenz has played its home matches at Stadion Oberwerth, which it shares with Rot-Weiß Koblenz and TuS Koblenz.

Opened in 1920, the stadium is part of the Sportpark Oberwerth complex and has a capacity of 9,500 spectators, including 2,000 covered seats.

== Honours ==
- Rheinlandliga
  - Champions: 2024–25
- Bezirksliga Rheinland-Mitte
  - Champions: 2021–22

== Notable players ==
- Josué Duverger, Haiti international goalkeeper called up for the 2026 FIFA World Cup during his time with Cosmos Koblenz.
- José-Junior Matuwila, former Angola international
