= Josué Duverger =

Haitian footballer (born 2000)

Personal information
- Date of birth: 27 April 2000 (age 26)
- Place of birth: Montreal, Quebec, Canada
- Height: 1.87 m (6 ft 2 in)
- Position: Goalkeeper

Team information
- Current team: Cosmos Koblenz
- Number: 33

Youth career
- 2007–2014: CS Les Étoiles de L'Est
- 2015–2016: Belenenses
- 2016–2018: Sporting CP
- 2018–2021: Vitória Setúbal

Senior career*
| Years | Team | Apps | (Gls) |
| 2016–2018 | Sporting CP B | 0 | (0) |
| 2018–2020 | Vitória Setúbal B | 20 | (0) |
| 2021–2022 | Vitória Setúbal | 2 | (0) |
| 2022–2024 | União Santarém | 30 | (0) |
| 2024– | Cosmos Koblenz | 59 | (0) |

International career^{‡}
- Haiti U17
| 2017–2018 | Haiti U20 | 5 | (0) |
- Haiti U21
- Haiti U23
| 2017– | Haiti | 8 | (0) |
- * Club domestic league appearances and goals as of 19 September 2026 ‡ National team caps and goals as of 4 October 2026

Josué Duverger (born 27 April 2000) is a professional footballer who plays as a goalkeeper for Rheinlandliga club Cosmos Koblenz. Born in Canada, he plays for the Haiti national team.

== Early life ==
Duverger began playing youth soccer in Canada at age seven with CS Les Étoiles de L'Est. Later he moved to Portugal where between 2015 and 2021, he appeared for the youth teams of Belenenses, Sporting CP, and Vitória Setúbal.

== Club career ==
He made his first team debut for Vitória Setúbal in 2021 and transferred to União Santarém in 2022. He then joined Cosmos Koblenz in the sixth tier of Germany in 2024.

== International career ==
Born in Montreal, Quebec, Canada, Duverguer is of Haitian descent. He was called up for an evaluation for the Canada men's national under-17 soccer team in October 2016. He was called up to the Haiti national under-20 football team for the 2017 CONCACAF U-20 Championship at the age of sixteen, appearing for all three of the teams' appearances in the tournament. He was also called up to the Haiti national under-17 football team for the 2017 CONCACAF U-17 Championship, but didn't make any appearances for the team in the tournament.

Duverguer made his debut for the senior Haiti national team in a 1–0 friendly win over the United Arab Emirates on 10 November 2017, at the age of seventeen.

On 15 June 2021 in a match against Canada, during CONCACAF World Cup qualifying, he mis-controlled a back pass and made two mis-kick attempts at a clearance as the ball rolled into the net for an own goal. The clip of the own goal went viral with some calling it one of the worst own goals ever seen.

On 15 May 2026, he was included in Haiti head coach Sébastien Migné's 26-man squad for the 2026 FIFA World Cup.

== Career statistics ==
=== Club ===
As of match played 19 September 2026

Appearances and goals by club, season and competition
| Club | Season | League | | | National cup | | Europe | | Other | | Total | |
| Club | Season | Division | Apps | Goals | Apps | Goals | Apps | Goals | Apps | Goals | Apps | Goals |
|---|---|---|---|---|---|---|---|---|---|---|---|---|
| Sporting CP B | 2016–17 | Campeonato de Portugal | 0 | 0 | — | | — | | — | | 0 | 0 |
| Sporting CP B | 2017–18 | Campeonato de Portugal | 0 | 0 | — | | — | | — | | 0 | 0 |
| Sporting CP B | Total | | 0 | 0 | — | | — | | — | | 0 | 0 |
| Vitória Setúbal B | 2018–19 | Segundo Nível Distrital | 3 | 0 | — | | — | | — | | 3 | 0 |
| Vitória Setúbal B | 2019–20 | Segundo Nível Distrital | 17 | 0 | — | | — | | — | | 17 | 0 |
| Vitória Setúbal B | Total | | 20 | 0 | — | | — | | — | | 20 | 0 |
| Vitória Setúbal | 2020–21 | Campeonato de Portugal | 1 | 0 | 0 | 0 | — | | — | | 1 | 0 |
| Vitória Setúbal | 2021–22 | Liga 3 | 1 | 0 | 0 | 0 | — | | — | | 1 | 0 |
| Vitória Setúbal | Total | | 2 | 0 | 0 | 0 | — | | — | | 2 | 0 |
| União Santarém | 2022–23 | Campeonato Nacional Serie C | 7 | 0 | 0 | 0 | — | | — | | 7 | 0 |
| União Santarém | 2023–24 | Campeonato Nacional Serie C | 23 | 0 | 0 | 0 | — | | — | | 23 | 0 |
| União Santarém | Total | | 30 | 0 | 0 | 0 | — | | — | | 30 | 0 |
| Cosmos Koblenz | 2024–25 | Rheinlandliga | 32 | 0 | — | | — | | 1 (Note: Appearance in Rhineland Cup) | 0 | 33 | 0 |
| Cosmos Koblenz | 2025–26 | Rheinlandliga | 22 | 0 | — | | — | | 1 | 0 | 23 | 0 |
| Cosmos Koblenz | 2026–27 | Rheinlandliga | 5 | 0 | — | | — | | — | | 5 | 0 |
| Cosmos Koblenz | Total | | 59 | 0 | — | | — | | 2 | 0 | 61 | 0 |
| Career total | | | 113 | 0 | 1 | 0 | — | | 2 | 0 | 116 | 0 |

=== International ===
As of match played 4 October 2026

Appearances and goals by national team and year
| National team | Year | Apps | Goals |
|---|---|---|---|
| Haiti | 2017 | 1 | 0 |
| Haiti | 2018 | 1 | 0 |
| Haiti | 2019 | 0 | 0 |
| Haiti | 2020 | 0 | 0 |
| Haiti | 2021 | 2 | 0 |
| Haiti | 2022 | 1 | 0 |
| Haiti | 2023 | 1 | 0 |
| Haiti | 2024 | 0 | 0 |
| Haiti | 2025 | 1 | 0 |
| Haiti | 2026 | 1 | 0 |
| Total | | 8 | 0 |
