= Haiti national football team =

Men's association football team

Haiti
- Nickname(s): Les Grenadiers (The Grenadiers); Le Rouge et Bleu (The Red and Blue); Les Bicolores (The Bicolor); La Sélection Nationale (The National Selection)
- Association: Fédération Haïtienne de Football (FHF)
- Confederation: CONCACAF (North America)
- Sub-confederation: CFU (Caribbean)
- Head coach: David Badia
- Captain: Johny Placide
- Most caps: Pierre Richard Bruny (95)
- Top scorer: Duckens Nazon (44)
- Home stadium: Stade Sylvio Cator
- FIFA code: HAI
First colours	Second colours	Third colours

FIFA ranking
- Current: 86 ▼2 (18 November 2026)
- Highest: 38 (January 2013)
- Lowest: 155 (April 1996)

First international
- Haiti 1–2 Jamaica (Port-au-Prince, Haiti; 22 March 1925)

Biggest win
- Haiti 13–0 Sint Maarten (Port-au-Prince, Haiti; 10 September 2018)

Biggest defeat
- Mexico 8–0 Haiti (Mexico City, Mexico; 19 July 1953); Costa Rica 8–0 Haiti (San José, Costa Rica; 19 March 1961)

World Cup
- Appearances: 2 (first in 1974)
- Best result: Group stage (1974, 2026)

CONCACAF Championship / Gold Cup
- Appearances: 17 (first in 1965)
- Best result: Champions (1973)

Copa América
- Appearances: 1 (first in 2016)
- Best result: Group stage (2016)

CCCF Championship
- Appearances: 2 (first in 1957)
- Best result: Champions (1957)

CFU Championship / Caribbean Cup
- Appearances: 11 (first in 1978)
- Best result: Champions (1979, 2007)
Medal record
CONCACAF Championship
Gold medal – first place	1973 Haiti	Team
Silver medal – second place	1971 Trinidad and Tobago	Team
Silver medal – second place	1977 Mexico	Team
CCCF Championship
Gold medal – first place	1957 Netherlands Antilles	Team
CFU Championship / Caribbean Cup
Gold medal – first place	1979 Suriname	Team
Gold medal – first place	2007 Trinidad and Tobago	Team
Silver medal – second place	2001 Trinidad and Tobago	Team
Bronze medal – third place	1978 Trinidad and Tobago	Team
Bronze medal – third place	1998 Trinidad and Tobago and Jamaica	Team
Bronze medal – third place	1999 Trinidad and Tobago	Team
Bronze medal – third place	2012 Antigua and Barbuda	Team
Bronze medal – third place	2014 Jamaica	Team

The Haiti national football team (French: Équipe d'Haïti de football, Haitian Creole: Ekip Foutbòl Ayiti) represents Haiti in men's international football, and is governed by the Haitian Football Federation (French: Fédération Haïtienne de Football, Haitian Creole: Federasyon Foutbòl Ayisyen), the governing body for football in Haiti founded in 1904. It has been a full member of FIFA since 1934, is a founding member of CONCACAF which was founded in 1961, and is also a member of CFU in the Caribbean Zone. From 1938 to 1961, the team was a member of CCCF, the former governing body for football in Central America and Caribbean. Haiti was also a member of PFC, the former unified confederation of the Americas.

Haiti has qualified for the FIFA World Cup twice (1974 and 2026), they scored their first goal against Italy. Haiti has participated seventeen times in CONCACAF's premier continental competition, it is the only Caribbean team to have won the title, winning the 1973 CONCACAF Championship. The team's best performance under the CONCACAF Gold Cup format was reaching the semifinals in 2019. It has participated three times in League A and twice in League B of the CONCACAF Nations League.

Haiti has participated once in the Copa América in 2016, the 100th anniversary of the tournament. In subcontinental competitions, the team won the 1957 CCCF Championship, the 1979 CFU Championship and the 2007 Caribbean Cup.

Haiti's home ground is Stade Sylvio Cator in Port-au-Prince and the team's manager is David Badía. Haiti has one of the longest football traditions in the region, being the second Caribbean team to make the FIFA World Cup, after qualifying from winning the 1973 CONCACAF Championship. They made their World Cup debut in 1974, and were beaten in the group stage by Italy, Poland, and Argentina, who were all pre-tournament favorites. In 2016, Haiti qualified for the 100th anniversary of the Copa América, by defeating Trinidad and Tobago. Haiti qualified for the World Cup in 2026 for the second time in its history, after defeating Nicaragua 2–0 in Curaçao, on the final matchday to top Group C of the qualifiers.

== History ==
=== Early years ===
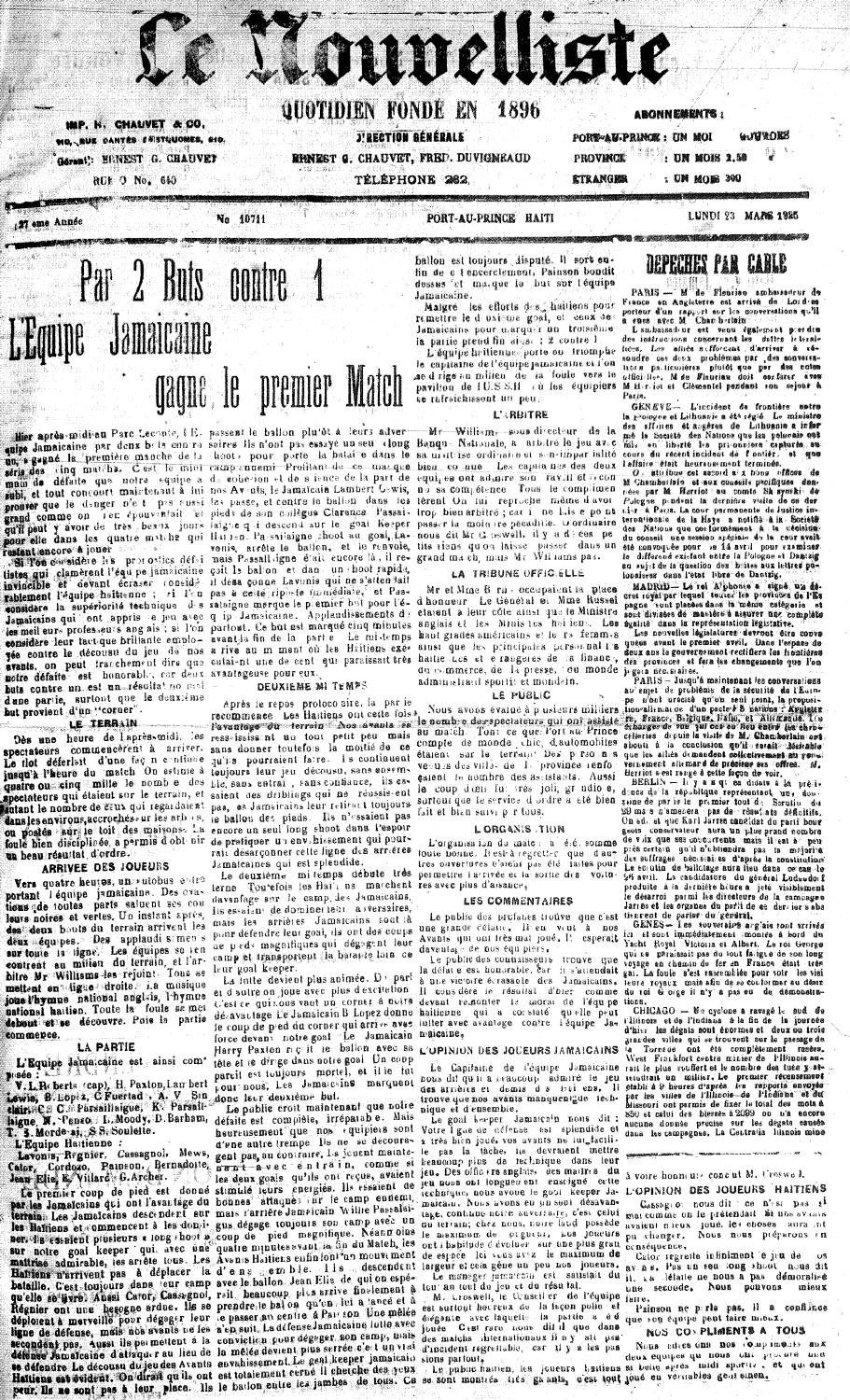
Le Nouvelliste (a Haitian newspaper) of 25 March 1925 describing the encounter between Haiti and Jamaica, who played their first official match on 22 March 1925 against their Caribbean neighbors in Haiti. Haiti was defeated 1–2 to the Jamaicans, as the first goal in Haiti's history was scored by Painson in the 86th minute.

Following the affiliation of the Haitian Football Federation with FIFA in 1933, Haiti was able to register for the qualifiers for the 1934 World Cup in Italy. Les Grenadiers led by coach Édouard Baker, played three games against Cuba, all at the Parc Leconte in Port-au-Prince, having lost twice (1–3, 0–6) and one resulting in a 1–1 draw.

Haiti would then reappear on the international scene almost twenty years later, since the Federation did not enter the national team for the World Cup qualifiers of the 1938 and 1950. For the 1954 edition held in Switzerland, the team under Frenchman Baron Paul found themselves in a qualification pool with the United States and Mexico. Haiti finished in last place, losing all of its matches, with a very heavy defeat conceded to Mexico 8–0. They would again withdraw from the qualifiers for the World Cup until 1970. Regionally, Haiti won in 1957 in their first participation in the CCCF Championship including a blowout victory against Cuba 6–1 and debuted in the 1959 Pan American Games. The selection is defeated heavily by the United States 7–2, and Brazil 9–1, and refused to resume play against Argentina after an arbitration decision. Victorious against Cuba 8–2, the team finished fourth in the competition. After a 1960 season without international meetings, Haiti led by Antoine Tassy, made its second appearance in CCCF Cup in 1961. Second in their group stage behind the host country, Costa Rica, the team finished last the final stage with three defeats in three games and twelve goals conceded to zero goals scored and finished fourth. The team suffered a crushing defeat in its last match to Costa Rica 8–0.

In 1961, Haiti joined the CONCACAF, born from the merger of the NAFC and the CCCF. In 1965, Haiti took part in the second edition of the CONCACAF Championship, after being eliminated in qualifying for the inaugural edition (1963 CONCACAF Championship). This continental meeting resulted in a last place finish, losing all five of its matches played; coach Antoine Tassy then resigns. However, he returned the following year again as the team's head coach, and won the Coupe Duvalier. During the 1967 Qualifiers, Haiti finished first and was undefeated atop of its group, ahead of Trinidad and Tobago. On 16 January 1967, marked its first victory in a competitive match against the Trinidadians, beating them 4–2. However, Haiti in the final round consisting of six teams, finished in fifth place, defeating Nicaragua 2–1 to avoid last place.

As part of the qualifiers for the 1970 World Cup hosted by Mexico, Haiti are engaged in group 2, in the company of Guatemala and Trinidad and Tobago. Directed by Antoine Tassy, Haiti was relevant for the first time in qualifying for the World Cup on 23 November 1968, in Port of Spain against Trinidad and Tobago. Haiti will reach rank at the top of the pool with wins against Trinidad and Tobago 4–0 and Guatemala 2–0, one draw against Guatemala 1–1, and one defeat conceded at home against Trinidad and Tobago 2–4 which enabled them to qualify to the second round. They then eliminated the United States before heading to the final round against El Salvador. Haiti lost the opening match at home 1–2, but managed to rebound and win 3–0 in San Salvador before losing again on neutral ground in Kingston in Jamaica, 1–0 in overtime.

At the CONCACAF Championship in 1969, Haiti was disqualified from the final round, when it had qualified in the field by beating the United States (the qualifying round is coupled with the qualifications for the World Cup 1970). Instead, the Federation was unable to register its team for the final round on time to the CONCACAF and therefore could not participate in the final round.

=== The Golden Age ===
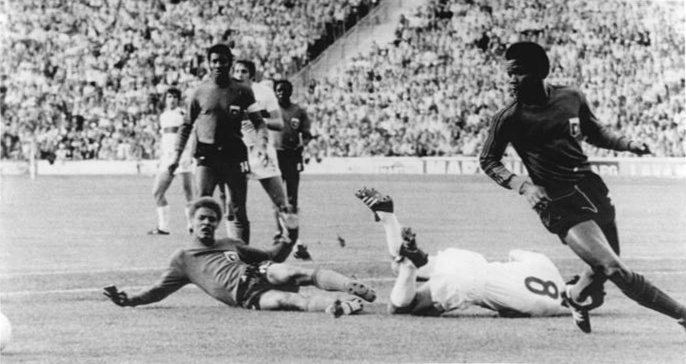
Haiti and their captain Wilner Nazaire against Italy at the 1974 World Cup.

In the 1970s, Haiti's status in the region remained very strong, being considered the third strongest team in the CONCACAF after Mexico and arguably Costa Rica. With Antoine Tassy as coach for much of this period, Haiti emerged as one of the strongest teams in the CONCACAF zone, being pooled with other regionally strong football nations such as Mexico and Costa Rica. By 1965, players like Henri Francillon, Philippe Vorbe, Guy Renold Jean François and Guy Saint-Vil were already playing in the team and would be stalwarts of the side in the coming years.

The team reached the final round of the qualifiers for the 1970 World Cup, where they faced El Salvador. After losing the first leg 2–1 at home, the team pulled off a 3–0 win at El Salvador. With each team having one win, the rules of the day dictated a play-off on neutral ground which El Salvador won to secure a place in the 1970 World Cup.

In the 1974 World Cup qualifiers, Haiti once again reached the final round in a qualifying tournament completely played at home. This time, they topped the group and qualified for their first appearance at the 1974 World Cup. In West Germany, they drew a tough group consisting of Italy, Argentina and Poland. The first half of their debut game against Italy ended in a scoreless draw, but the team surprised the football world when star forward Emmanuel Sanon scored shortly after the break to give Haiti a 1–0 lead. Although the Italians eventually came back to win the game 3–1, Sanon's goal ended goal keeper Dino Zoff's record run of 1143 minutes without conceding a goal in international matches. The team went on to lose to Poland (0–7) and Argentina (1–4) to finish last in their group.

=== Late 1970s–2000s ===
Haiti would reach the final rounds of the 1978 and 1982 qualifiers, but failed to make the cut. The years since have seen Haiti's footballing status decline markedly. In recent years, the political situation in the country has led to numerous defections from members of the football team. The team has rebuilt somewhat through the Haitian diaspora in Miami, Florida, and some Haitian home games have been played in Miami in recent years. Haiti as of recently has been rising once again as a footballing power in the CONCACAF.

=== Earthquake of 2010 and aftermath ===
In the January 2010 earthquake, at least 30 people with ties to Haitian football perished, including players, coaches, referees and administrative and medical representatives. Twenty others with ties to Haitian football were feared to be buried in the ruins.

In November 2011, Haiti was knocked out of the qualifiers for the 2014 World Cup by Antigua and Barbuda under the leadership of Brazilian coach Edson Tavares. In 2012, Tavares was replaced by Cuban coach Israel Blake Cantero who led the national team through the 2012 Caribbean Championship. Haiti finished third in the Caribbean Championship warranting a spot in the 2013 Gold Cup. The following year, Haiti would have a bad string of defeats against Chile, Bolivia, Oman and the Dominican Republic. In June 2013, Haiti bounced back from these shortcomings with a close 2–1 loss to reigning world champions Spain and an impressive 2–2 draw with footballing powerhouse Italy, with goals in both games scored by Wilde-Donald Guerrier, Olrish Saurel and Jean-Philippe Peguero respectively. The 2018 World Cup qualifiers had Haiti beating Grenada to reach the fourth round, where they fell off with only four points – one for a goalless draw with Panama, three for beating Jamaica in Kingston. In 2019, they made the farthest they ever had in the CONCACAF Gold Cup by going 3–0 in the group stages including a last-minute goal against Costa Rica and coming back from a 2–0 deficit against Canada in the Quarter-finals, winning the game 3–2. However, it all stopped after Mexico scored a penalty late in the game. They would lose the game 1–0.

=== 2026: Return to the World Cup ===
Haiti began their campaign to qualify for the 2026 FIFA World Cup in the second round of CONCACAF qualifying. Due to the ongoing security and political crisis in Haiti, the national team was unable to host any matches in Haiti, instead playing all of its qualifying fixtures at neutral sites. Haiti advanced to the third round of qualification in second place of Group C, losing only one match to eventual group winners Curacao. In the third round, Haiti would be grouped with Costa Rica, Honduras and Nicaragua in Group C. Haiti began the round by drawing with both Honduras and Costa Rica, and then defeating Nicaragua. However, a subsequent 3–0 loss to Honduras meant that Haiti would have needed to win both their remaining matches and have other group results go their way to qualify directly. A 1–0 win over Costa Rica, followed by a 2–0 win over Nicaragua on the final matchday, combined with Honduras losing to Nicaragua and drawing with Costa Rica, meant that Haiti finished at the top of Group C, earning direct qualification to the tournament. This marked the country's second appearance in the FIFA World Cup, its first since 1974, breaking a 52-year drought.

Communities of the Haitian diaspora, such as Little Haiti in Miami, found the team's appearance in this World Cup a source of hope despite the long-standing political struggle. However, there were difficulties in getting to the tournament: Haiti was put on a list of countries whose citizens were banned from entering the United States by President Donald Trump. FIFA also forced the HFF to change the team's jerseys, citing political overtones over the design depicting the Battle of Vertières in the Haitian Revolution. The team would be officially eliminated after two games, a 1-0 loss to Scotland and a 3-0 defeat to five-time champions Brazil. Haiti would finally score their first World Cup goals in 52 years with a Yassine Bounou own goal and a Wilson Isidor goal in a 4-2 loss against 2022 semifinalist Morocco.

== Team image ==
=== Colours ===
The Haiti national team utilizes a two-colour system, composed of red and blue. The team's two colours originate from the national flag of Haiti, known as the bicolore. Although, during the Duvalier administration in Haiti, the country underwent a color change to its flag, swapping out the blue for black and it reflected in its 1974 World Cup kit and federation crest.

Since the team's inception, Haiti's kit has undergone numerous color pattern variations. The home kit has traditionally been either all blue or a variation of predominately blue shirts, with red shorts and blue socks, while the away kit has traditionally been inversely worn that is either all red or a variation of predominately red shirts, with blue shorts and red socks. Haiti has occasionally had a third kit, which has traditionally been all white, which the current kit features, along with its all blue colours at home and all red colours away. Haiti also wears the crest of the Federation on its shirt and at times on its shorts as well.

Haiti has been provided kits by a number of manufacturers, some of which have been from a few local and lesser known suppliers. The first known kit manufacturer was Adidas for the 1974 World Cup. In 2013, a five-year contract was reached with Colombian manufacturer, Saeta for $1 million.

=== Kit suppliers ===
Kit supplier	Period	Note
Local equipment	1904–1969	
(West Germany) Adidas	1974–1979	
(France) Le Coq Sportif	1980	
(Germany) Adidas	1981–1982	
(France) Le Coq Sportif	1983–1986	
(United Kingdom) Umbro	1986–1992	
(Denmark) Hummel	1993–1994	
(Italy) Pienne	1995–1996	
(Germany) Uhlsport	1997–1999	
(Brazil) Finta	2000	
(Saint Lucia) Sport Globe	2001–2002	
(Spain) Joma	2003–2004	
(United Kingdom) Umbro	2005	
(Brazil) Finta	2006–2007	
(Italy) Diadora	2007	
(Brazil) Finta	2008	
(Japan) Squadra	2008	
(United States) Plus One	2009	
(Japan) Squadra	2010	
(Germany) Adidas	2010–2013	
(Colombia) Saeta	2013–present	

== Results and fixtures ==
The following is a list of match results in the last 12 months, as well as any future matches that have been scheduled.

Win Draw Loss Fixture

=== 2025 ===
13 November 2026 FIFA World Cup qualification	Haiti	1–0	Costa Rica	Willemstad, Curaçao
22:00 UTC−4	Pierrot 44'	Report		Stadium: Ergilio Hato Stadium; Referee: Joe Dickerson (United States)

18 November 2026 FIFA World Cup qualification	Haiti	2–0	Nicaragua	Willemstad, Curaçao
21:00 UTC−4	Louicius 9'; Providence 45+1'	Report		Stadium: Ergilio Hato Stadium; Referee: Mario Escobar (Guatemala)

=== 2026 ===
28 March Friendly	Haiti	0–1	Tunisia	Toronto, Canada
20:00 UTC−4	Jean Jacques (yellow card) 58' (yellow-red card) 90+3'	Report	Tounekti 7'	Stadium: BMO Field; Referee: Pierre-Luc Lauzière (Canada)

31 March Friendly	Haiti	1–1	Iceland	Toronto, Canada
13:30 UTC−4	Isidor 88'	Report	Sigurðsson 61'	Stadium: BMO Field; Referee: Carly Shaw-Maclaren (Canada)

2 June Friendly	Haiti	4–0	New Zealand	Fort Lauderdale, United States
20:30 UTC−4	Providence 12'; Joseph 51'; Pierrot 62'; Lacroix 87'	Report		Stadium: Inter Miami CF Stadium; Referee: Rubiel Vázquez (United States)

5 June Friendly	Haiti	1–2	Peru	Miami, United States
20:00 UTC−4	Isidor 16'	Report	Garcés 81'; Vélez 84'	Stadium: Nu Stadium; Attendance: 26,700; Referee: Filip Dujic (Canada)

13 June 2026 FIFA World Cup GS	Haiti	0–1	Scotland	Foxborough, United States
21:00 UTC−4		Report	McGinn 28'	Stadium: Gillette Stadium; Attendance: 64,146; Referee: Mustapha Ghorbal (Algeria)

19 June 2026 FIFA World Cup GS	Brazil	3–0	Haiti	Philadelphia, United States
21:00 UTC−4	Cunha 23', 36'; Vinícius 45+3'	Report		Stadium: Lincoln Financial Field; Attendance: 68,324; Referee: Alejandro Hernández Hernández (Spain)

24 June 2026 FIFA World Cup GS	Morocco	4–2	Haiti	Atlanta, United States
18:00 UTC−4	Hakimi 39'; Saibari 45+1'; Rahimi 78'; Yassine 89'	Report	Bounou 10' (o.g.); Isidor 43'	Stadium: Mercedes-Benz Stadium; Attendance: 68,239; Referee: Danny Makkelie (Netherlands)

24 September 2026–27 Nations League	Haiti	3–2	Trinidad and Tobago	Kingston, Jamaica
19:00 UTC−5	Picault 23'; Metusala 90+1'; Isidor 90+8'	Report	Frederick 31'; L. García 59'	Stadium: Sabina Park (Note: Haiti will play their home matches at Sabina Park in Kingston, Jamaica due to the ongoing Haitian crisis.); Attendance: 277; Referee: Filip Dujic (Canada)

27 September 2026–27 Nations League	Haiti	2–0	Costa Rica	Kingston, Jamaica
18:00 UTC−5	Bellegarde 9'; Calvo 39' (o.g.)	Report		Stadium: Sabina Park; Attendance: 317; Referee: Iván Barton (El Salvador)

1 October 2026–27 Nations League	Dominican Republic	1–4	Haiti	Santo Domingo, Dominican Republic
20:00 UTC−4	Romero 55'	Report	Deedson 9'; Isidor 51', 67'; Fortuné 76'	Stadium: Estadio Olímpico Félix Sánchez; Attendance: 23,703; Referee: Katja Koroleva (United States)

4 October 2026–27 Nations League	Costa Rica	2–0	Haiti	San José, Costa Rica
18:00 UTC−6	Mora 6'; Soto 21'	Report		Stadium: Estadio Ricardo Saprissa Aymá; Attendance: 12,219; Referee: Armando Villarreal (United States)

14 November 2026–27 Nations League QF 1st Leg	Haiti	0–6	United States	Miami, United States
16:30 UTC−5		Report	Trusty 10'; Hall 52'; Pulisic 62' (pen.), 63'; McKennie 68'; Balogun 82'	Stadium: Nu Stadium (Note: Haiti played their home match at Nu Stadium in Miami, United States due to the ongoing Haitian crisis); Attendance: 21,597; Referee: Walter López (Guatemala)

17 November 2026–27 Nations League QF 2nd Leg	United States	2–0 (8–0 agg.)	Haiti	Cincinnati, United States
19:00 UTC−5	Pulisic 25'; Hall 43'	Report		Stadium: TQL Stadium; Referee: Oshane Nation (Jamaica)
Note: United States won 8–0 on aggregate, advanced to the Finals and qualified for the 2027 Gold Cup. Haiti qualified for the 2027 Gold Cup qualification.

=== 2027 ===
March 2027 CONCACAF Gold Cup prelims	Nicaragua	v	Haiti	Nicaragua

March 2027 CONCACAF Gold Cup prelims	Haiti	v	Nicaragua	TBA

== Coaching staff ==
=== Current staff ===
Name	Position
(Spain) David Badía	Head coach
(Haiti) Gavin Jean-Marie	Assistant coach
(Haiti) Frantz Joséphine	Assistant coach
(Haiti) Ismaël Saint-Lucien	Fitness coach
(Haiti) Vincentin Beaudiere	Goalkeeping coach
(Haiti) Mickaël Flavien	Match analyst
(Haiti) Joris Renaissance (Haiti) Paulin Marchette	Doctors
(Haiti) Christophe Maxime (Haiti) Erasme Papillon (Haiti) Léandre Aïeux (Haiti) André Duplexe	Physiotherapists
(Haiti) Loris Benoît	Team coordinator
(Haiti) Géraldin Biscuit	Technical director

=== Coaching history ===
Caretaker managers are listed in italics.

- (Haiti) Édouard Baker (1934)
- (Haiti) Antoine Champagne (1951)
- (France) Paul Baron (1953–1954)
- (Greece) Dan Georgiádis (1956–1957)
- (Haiti) Lucien Barozy (1957)
- (Argentina) Alfredo Obertello (1959)
- (Haiti) Antoine Tassy (1959) 1961; 1965–1973
- (Italy) Ettore Trevisan (1973)
- (Haiti) Antoine Tassy (1973–1974, 1976?, 1981)
- (Socialist Federal Republic of Yugoslavia) Mladen Kashanine (1975)
- (West Germany) Sepp Piontek (1976–1978)
- (Haiti) René Vertus (1978–1979)−1980?)
- (Haiti) Claude Barthélemy (1984–1985)
- (Haiti) Ernst Jean-Baptiste (1991–1992, 1999) 1994
- (Haiti) Hervé Calixte (1996–1997)
- (Haiti) Jean-Michel Vaval (1997–1999)
- (France) Bernard Souilliez (1999)
- (Haiti) Emmanuel Sanon (1999–2000)
- (Haiti) Elie Jean & Sonche Pierre (2001)
- (Argentina) Jorge Castelli (2001–2002)
- (Argentina) Vicente Cayetano Rodríguez (2002–2003)
- (Argentina) Andrés Cruciani (2002–2003)
- (Brazil) Caetano Rodrigues (2003)
- (Haiti) Maxime Augusto (2003)
- (Haiti) Carlo Marcelin (2003)
- (United States) Fernando Clavijo (2003–2004)
- (Haiti) Carlo Marcelin (2004–2006)
- (Cuba) Luis Armelio Garcia (2006–2008)
- (Haiti) Sonche Pierre, Carlo Marcelin & Wilner Étienne (2008)
- (Haiti) Wagneau Eloi ^{p} (2008)
- (Haiti) Wilner Étienne & Sonche Pierre (2008)
- (Colombia) Jairo Ríos (2008–2010)
- (Brazil) Edson Tavares (2010–2011)
- (Haiti) Carlo Marcelin (2011)
- (Cuba) Israel Blake Cantero (2012–2013)
- (Haiti) Pierre Roland Saint-Jean (2013)
- (France) Marc Collat (2014–2015, 2017–2019)
- (France) Patrice Neveu (2015–2016)
- (Haiti) Jean-Claude Josaphat (2016–2017)
- (Haiti) Jean-Jacques Pierre (2021–2023)
- (Spain) Gabriel Calderón (2023–2024)
- (France) Sébastien Migné (2024–2026)
- (Spain) David Badía (2026–present)

Notes

- ^{p} Denotes a player-manager

== Players ==
=== Current squad ===
The following players were called up for the 2026–27 CONCACAF Nations League A matches against Trinidad and Tobago, Costa Rica (twice) and Dominican Republic on 24, 27 September, 1 and 4 October 2026; respectively.
Caps and goals are correct as of 4 October 2026, after the match against Costa Rica.

No.	Pos.	Player	Date of birth (age)	Caps	Goals	Club
1	GK	Alexandre Pierre	25 February 2001 (age 25)	18	0	(French Football Federation) Sochaux
12	GK	Jonah Mednard	26 March 2005 (age 21)	0	0	(United States Soccer Federation) Wake Forest Demon Deacons
23	GK	Josué Duverger	27 April 2000 (age 26)	7	0	(German Football Association) Cosmos Koblenz
2	DF	Carlens Arcus	28 June 1996 (age 30)	60	1	(French Football Federation) Angers
3	DF	Francois Dulysse	13 April 1999 (age 27)	15	0	(Albanian Football Federation) Vllaznia
4	DF	Garven Metusala	31 December 1999 (age 26)	17	1	(United States Soccer Federation) Colorado Springs Switchbacks
5	DF	Hannes Delcroix	28 February 1999 (age 27)	13	0	(Swiss Football Association) Lugano
13	DF	Duke Lacroix	14 October 1993 (age 33)	18	3	(United States Soccer Federation) Colorado Springs Switchbacks
14	DF	Keeto Thermoncy	March 29, 2006 (age 20)	1	0	(Swiss Football Association) Stade Nyonnais
22	DF	Jean-Kévin Duverne	12 July 1997 (age 29)	21	1	(Cyprus Football Association) Omonia
	DF	Martin Expérience	9 March 1999 (age 27)	27	0	(Royal Belgian Football Association) Dender
6	MF	Carl Sainté	9 August 2002 (age 24)	30	0	(United States Soccer Federation) El Paso Locomotive
8	MF	Miguel Joseph	14 September 2009 (age 17)	0	0	(Jamaica Football Federation) Mount Pleasant
10	MF	Jean-Ricner Bellegarde	27 June 1998 (age 28)	17	1	(The Football Association) Wolverhampton Wanderers
17	MF	Danley Jean Jacques	20 May 2000 (age 26)	37	6	(United States Soccer Federation) Philadelphia Union
	MF	Dominique Simon	29 July 2000 (age 26)	4	0	(Football Association of the Czech Republic) Pardubice
	MF	Woodensky Pierre	30 December 2004 (age 21)	1	0	(Canadian Soccer Association) Forge FC
7	FW	Fafà Picault	23 February 1991 (age 35)	20	2	(United States Soccer Federation) Atlanta United
9	FW	Kenny Quetant	17 July 2006 (age 20)	3	0	(German Football Association) Werder Bremen
11	FW	Louicius Deedson	11 February 2001 (age 25)	39	11	(French Football Federation) Sochaux
15	FW	Ruben Providence	7 July 2001 (age 25)	22	3	(Turkish Football Federation) Bodrum
16	FW	Lovend's Delinois	5 October 2004 (age 22)	1	0	(United States Soccer Federation) Inter Miami
18	FW	Wilson Isidor	27 August 2000 (age 26)	11	6	(The Football Association) Sunderland
19	FW	Yassin Fortuné	30 January 1999 (age 27)	9	1	(Portuguese Football Federation) Vizela
20	FW	Frantzdy Pierrot	29 March 1995 (age 31)	57	34	(Hellenic Football Federation) AEK Athens
21	FW	Dany Jean	28 November 2002 (age 23)	23	1	(Portuguese Football Federation) Torreense
	FW	Josué Casimir	24 September 2001 (age 25)	10	0	(Russian Football Union) Dynamo Moscow

=== Recent call-ups ===
The following players have been called up within the last twelve months.

Pos.	Player	Date of birth (age)	Caps	Goals	Club	Latest call-up
GK	Johny Placide (captain)	29 January 1988 (age 38)	85	0	Unattached	2026 FIFA World Cup^{RET}
GK	Tony Algarin	20 January 2007 (age 19)	0	0	(France) Reims	v. Honduras, 13 October 2025
DF	Ricardo Adé	21 May 1990 (age 36)	62	2	(Ecuador) LDU Quito	2026 FIFA World Cup
DF	Wilguens Paugain	24 August 2001 (age 25)	8	0	(Belgium) Zulte Waregem	2026 FIFA World Cup
DF	Delentz Pierre	16 November 2000 (age 26)	0	0	(United States) FC Tulsa	v. Iceland, 31 March 2026
DF	Stéphane Lambese	10 April 1995 (age 31)	24	1	(France) Fleury	v. Nicaragua, 18 November 2025
MF	Leverton Pierre	9 March 1998 (age 28)	34	0	(Portugal) Vizela	2026 FIFA World Cup ^{INJ}
MF	Christopher Attys	13 March 2001 (age 25)	15	3	Unattached	v. Nicaragua, 18 November 2025
FW	Duckens Nazon	7 April 1994 (age 32)	83	44	(Libya) Al-Nasr	2026 FIFA World Cup
FW	Derrick Etienne Jr.	25 November 1996 (age 29)	52	8	(Canada) Toronto FC	2026 FIFA World Cup
FW	Lenny Joseph	12 October 2000 (age 26)	5	1	(Hungary) Ferencváros	2026 FIFA World Cup
FW	Woobens Pacius	11 May 2001 (age 25)	1	0	(France) Rouen	v. Iceland, 31 March 2026
^{INJ} Withdrew due to an injury.^{PRE} Preliminary squad.^{WD} Withdrew from the squad due to non-injury issues.^{RET} Retired from the national team.

== Player records ==
As of 4 October 2026
The FHF's archives have been displaced by earthquakes and civil unrest; data on early Haitian players is still being investigated.
Players in bold are still active with Haiti.

=== Most appearances ===
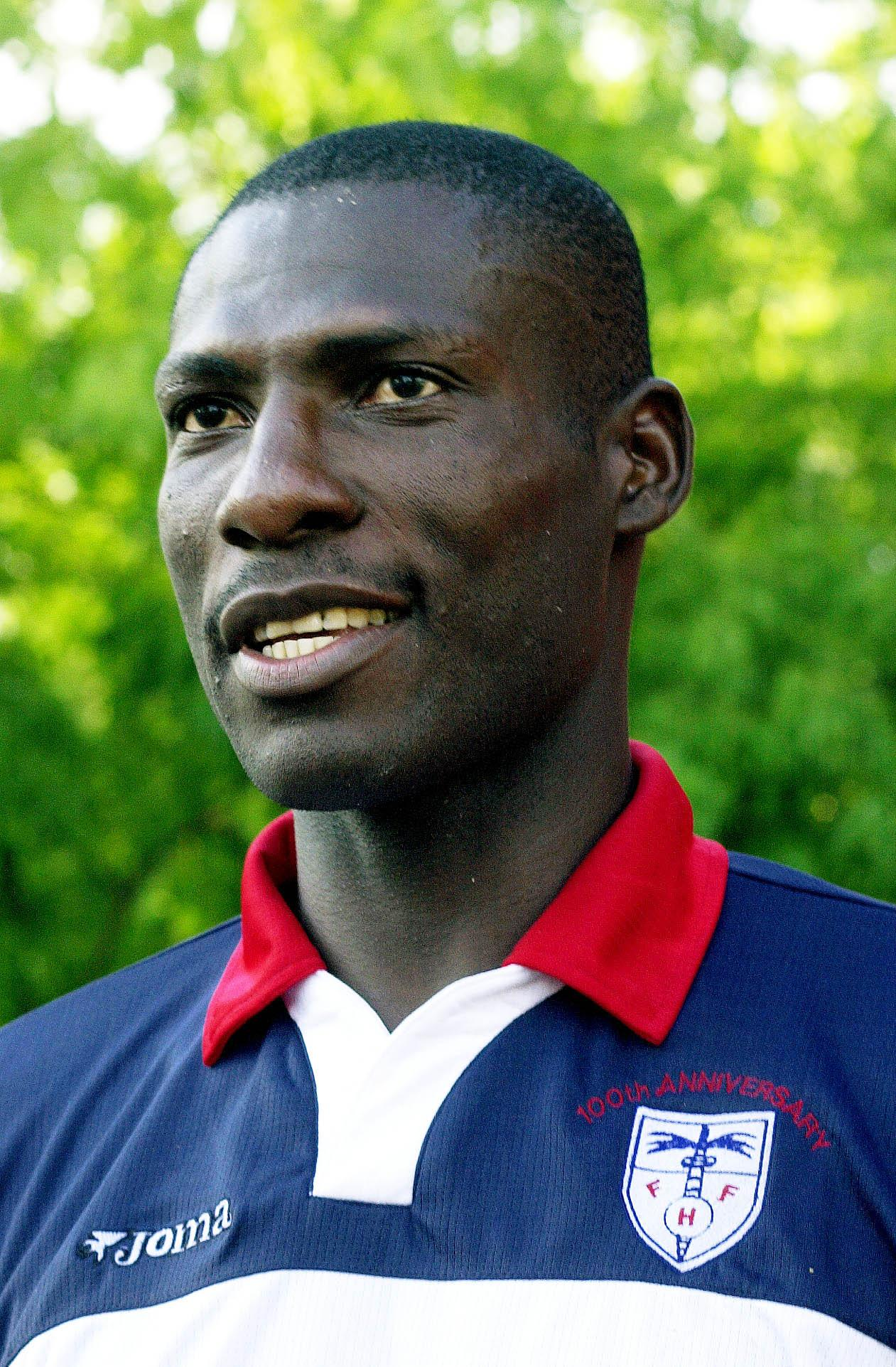
Pierre Richard Bruny is Haiti's most capped player with 95 appearances.

Rank	Player	Caps	Goals	Period
1	Pierre Richard Bruny	95	2	1998–2010
2	Johny Placide	85	0	2011–2026
3	**Duckens Nazon**	83	44	2014–present
4	Mechack Jérôme	80	4	2008–2023
5	Frantz Gilles	78	2	2000–2010
6	Jean Sony Alcénat	67	7	2006–2016
6	Peter Germain	67	3	2001–2012
8	Emmanuel Sanon	65	37	1970–1981
9	Ricardo Adé	62	2	2016–2026
10	Wilde-Donald Guerrier	61	11	2010–2023

=== Most goals ===
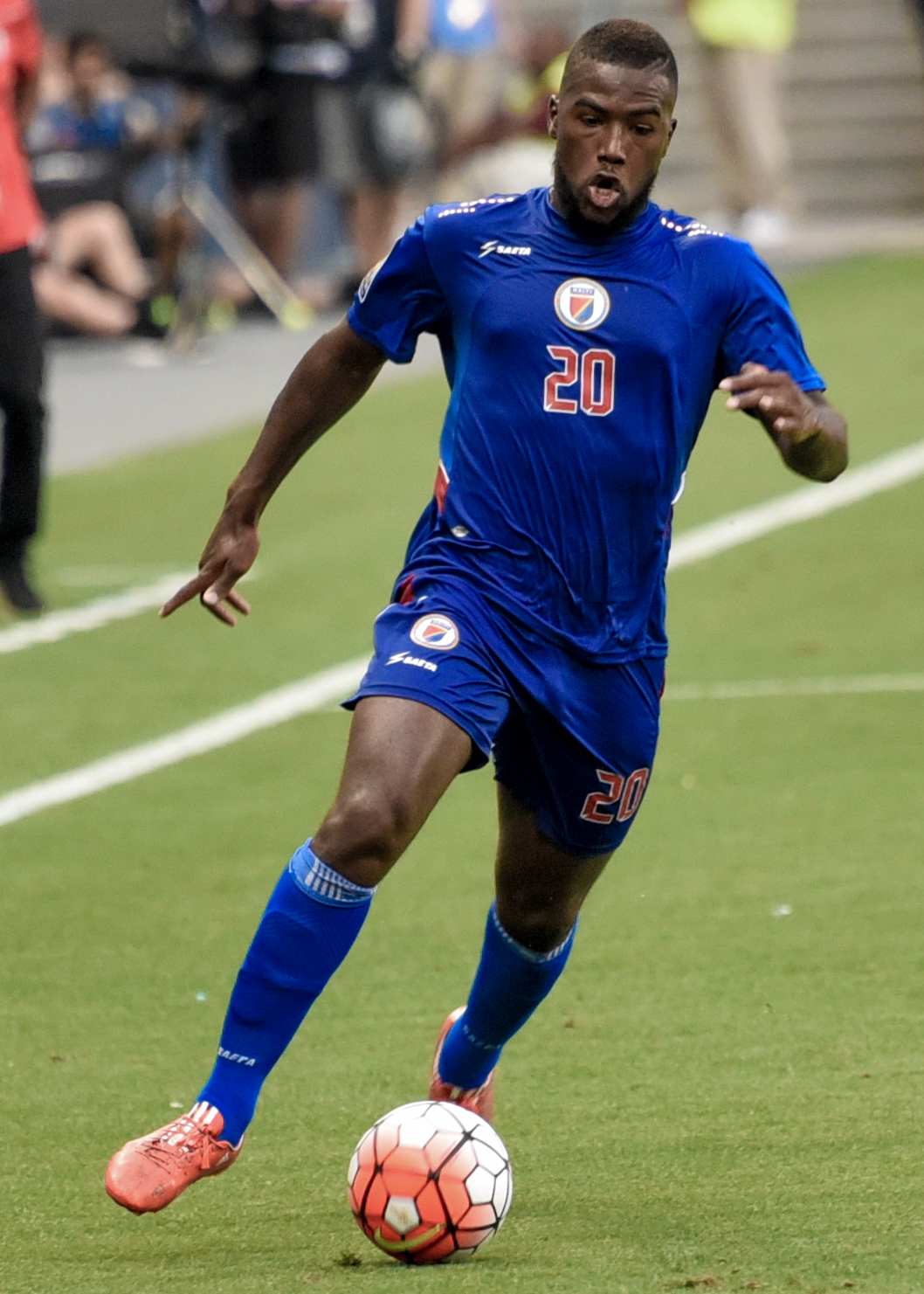
Duckens Nazon is Haiti's top scorer with 44 goals.

Rank	Player	Goals	Caps	Ratio	Period
1	**Duckens Nazon**	44	83	0.53	2014–present
2	Emmanuel Sanon	37	65	0.57	1970–1981
3	**Frantzdy Pierrot**	34	57	0.6	2018–present
4	Golman Pierre	23	28	0.82	1996–2003
5	Jean-Philippe Peguero	16	28	0.57	2003–2013
6	Kervens Belfort	14	41	0.34	2010–2017
7	Éliphène Cadet	13	42	0.31	2004–2010
8	**Carnejy Antoine**	12	21	0.57	2021–present
8	Jean-Eudes Maurice	12	30	0.4	2011–2016
10	Alexandre Boucicaut	11	51	0.22	2001–2011
10	Wilde-Donald Guerrier	11	61	0.18	2010–2023

== Competitive record ==
=== FIFA World Cup ===
FIFA World Cup record										Qualification record					
Year	Result	Position	Pld	W	D	L	GF	GA	Squad	Pld	W	D	L	GF	GA
(Uruguay) 1930	Not a FIFA member									Not a FIFA member					
(Italy) 1934	Did not qualify									3	0	1	2	2	10
(France) 1938	Did not participate									Declined participation					
(Brazil) 1950	Did not participate									Declined participation					
(Switzerland) 1954	Did not qualify									4	0	0	4	2	18
(Sweden) 1958	Did not participate									Declined participation					
(Chile) 1962	Did not participate									Declined participation					
(England) 1966	Did not participate									Declined participation					
(Mexico) 1970	Did not qualify									9	5	1	3	16	8
(West Germany) 1974	Group stage	15th	3	0	0	3	2	14	Squad	7	6	0	1	20	3
(Argentina) 1978	Did not qualify									12	8	3	1	25	9
(Spain) 1982	Did not qualify									9	2	3	4	6	11
(Mexico) 1986	Did not qualify									6	1	0	5	5	11
(Italy) 1990	Did not participate									Declined participation					
(United States) 1994	Did not qualify									2	1	0	1	2	2
(France) 1998	Did not qualify									4	2	1	1	9	8
(South Korea) (Japan) 2002	Did not qualify									8	4	1	3	23	12
(Germany) 2006	Did not qualify									4	2	1	1	8	4
(South Africa) 2010	Did not qualify									8	1	4	3	5	13
(Brazil) 2014	Did not qualify									6	4	1	1	21	6
(Russia) 2018	Did not qualify									8	3	1	4	8	5
(Qatar) 2022	Did not qualify									5	3	0	2	13	4
(Canada) (Mexico) (United States) 2026	Group stage	45th	3	0	0	3	2	8	Squad	10	6	2	2	20	13
(Morocco) (Portugal) (Spain) 2030	To be determined									To be determined					
(Saudi Arabia) 2034	To be determined									To be determined					
Total	Group stage	2/22	6	0	0	6	4	22	—	105	48	19	38	185	137

=== CONCACAF Gold Cup ===
CONCACAF Championship / Gold Cup record										Qualification record					
Year	Result	Position	Pld	W	D*	L	GF	GA	Squad	Pld	W	D	L	GF	GA
(El Salvador) 1963	Did not qualify									2	0	0	2	1	4
(Guatemala) 1965	Sixth place	6th	5	0	1	4	3	13	Squad	Qualified automatically					
(Honduras) 1967	Fifth place	5th	5	1	0	4	5	9	Squad	4	3	1	0	7	3
(Costa Rica) 1969	Disqualified									2	2	0	0	3	0
(Trinidad and Tobago) 1971	Runners-up	2nd	5	2	3	0	9	1	Squad	Qualified automatically					
(Haiti) 1973	Champions	1st	5	4	0	1	8	3	Squad	2	2	0	0	12	0
(Mexico) 1977	Runners-up	2nd	5	3	1	1	6	6	Squad	7	5	2	0	19	3
(Honduras) 1981	Sixth place	6th	5	0	2	3	2	9	Squad	4	2	1	1	4	2
1985	Group stage	9th	4	0	0	4	0	9	Squad	2	1	0	1	5	2
1989	Did not participate									Did not participate					
(United States) 1991	Did not qualify									2	1	1	0	4	3
(Mexico) (United States) 1993	Did not participate									Did not participate					
(United States) 1996	Did not participate									Did not participate					
(United States) 1998	Withdrew									Withdrew					
(United States) 2000	Group stage	11th	2	0	1	1	1	4	Squad	10	6	1	3	22	11
(United States) 2002	Quarter-finals	7th	3	1	0	2	3	4	Squad	8	5	2	1	30	9
(Mexico) (United States) 2003	Did not qualify									5	3	0	2	7	6
(United States) 2005	Did not qualify									5	3	0	2	7	6
(United States) 2007	Group stage	10th	3	0	2	1	2	4	Squad	13	8	1	4	27	12
(United States) 2009	Quarter-finals	8th	4	1	1	2	4	7	Squad	3	1	1	1	4	4
(United States) 2011	Did not qualify									3	1	1	1	3	5
(United States) 2013	Group stage	9th	3	1	0	2	2	3	Squad	11	8	1	2	19	5
(Canada) (United States) 2015	Quarter-finals	6th	4	1	1	2	2	3	Squad	7	3	3	1	13	9
(United States) 2017	Did not qualify									6	4	0	2	15	14
(Costa Rica) (Jamaica) (United States) 2019	Semi-finals	3rd	5	4	0	1	9	5	Squad	4	4	0	0	19	2
(United States) 2021	Group stage	11th	3	1	0	2	3	6	Squad	6	2	3	2	13	6
(Canada) (United States) 2023	Group stage	12th	3	1	0	2	4	6	Squad	6	5	1	0	22	5
(Canada) (United States) 2025	Group stage	13th	3	0	1	2	2	4	Squad	6	6	0	0	29	5
2027	To be determined									To be determined					
Total	1 Title	17/28	67	20	13	34	65	96	—	118	74	19	25	285	116

=== CONCACAF Nations League ===
CONCACAF Nations League record
League phase / Quarter-finals										Final phase								
Season	Division	Group	Pld	W	D	L	GF	GA	P/R	Year	Result	Pld	W	D	L	GF	GA	Squad
2019–20	A	D	4	0	3	1	3	4	▼	(United States) 2021	Did not qualify							
2022–23	B	B	6	5	1	0	22	5	▲	(United States) 2023	Ineligible							
2023–24	A	B	4	0	3	1	5	6	▼	(United States) 2024	Did not qualify							
2024–25	B	C	6	6	0	0	29	5	▲	(United States) 2025	Ineligible							
2026–27	A	A	6	3	0	3	9	13	Same position	(United States) 2027	Did not qualify							
Total	—	—	26	14	7	5	68	33	—	Total	0 Titles	—	—	—	—	—	—	—

CONCACAF Nations League history
First match	Curaçao 1–0 Haiti (7 September 2019; Willemstad, Curaçao)
Biggest win	Sint Maarten 0–8 Haiti (15 November 2024; Mayagüez, Puerto Rico)
Biggest defeat	Haiti 0–6 United States (14 November 2026; Miami, United States)
Best result	—
Worst result	—

=== Copa América ===
Copa América record
Year	Result	Position	Pld	W	D*	L	GF	GA	Squad
(Ecuador) 1993^{1} to (Chile) 2015	Did not participate								
(United States) 2016^{2}	Group stage	16th	3	0	0	3	1	12	Squad
(Brazil) 2019	Did not participate								
(Brazil) 2021	Did not participate								
(United States) 2024	Did not qualify								
Total	Group stage	1/13	3	0	0	3	1	12	—

^{1} Ecuador 1993 was the first time nations from outside the CONMEBOL were invited.
^{2} United States 2016 was the first time nations from outside the CONMEBOL could qualify and host.

=== Caribbean Cup ===
CFU Championship / Caribbean Cup record										Qualification					
Year	Result	Position	Pld	W	D*	L	GF	GA	Squad	Pld	W	D	L	GF	GA
(Trinidad and Tobago) 1978	Third place	3rd	3	1	1	1	3	5	Squad	4	2	2	0	7	4
(Suriname) 1979	Champions	1st	3	3	0	0	4	1	Squad	4	4	0	0	9	0
(Puerto Rico) 1981	Did not participate									Did not participate					
(French Guiana) 1983	Did not participate									Did not participate					
(Barbados) 1985	Did not participate									Did not participate					
(Martinique) 1988	Did not participate									Did not participate					
(Barbados) 1989	Did not participate									Did not participate					
(Trinidad and Tobago) 1990	Did not participate									Did not participate					
(Jamaica) 1991	Did not qualify									2	1	1	0	4	3
(Trinidad and Tobago) 1992	Did not participate									Did not participate					
(Jamaica) 1993	Did not participate									Did not participate					
(Trinidad and Tobago) 1994	Group stage	5th	3	1	1	1	4	6	Squad	1	1	0	0	1	0
(Cayman Islands) (Jamaica) 1995	Did not participate									Did not participate					
(Trinidad and Tobago) 1996	Group stage	6th	3	0	2	1	2	3	Squad	2	1	1	0	7	1
(Antigua and Barbuda) (Saint Kitts and Nevis) 1997	Withdrew									Withdrew					
(Jamaica) (Trinidad and Tobago) 1998	Third place	3rd	5	3	0	2	10	8	Squad	2	2	0	0	9	0
(Trinidad and Tobago) 1999	Third place	3rd	4	2	0	2	8	12	Squad	3	3	0	0	12	0
(Trinidad and Tobago) 2001	Runners-up	2nd	5	2	2	1	13	6	Squad	3	3	0	0	17	3
(Barbados) 2005	Did not qualify									7	4	1	2	18	5
(Trinidad and Tobago) 2007	Champions	1st	5	4	0	1	9	5	Squad	8	4	1	3	18	7
(Jamaica) 2008	Group stage	5th	3	1	1	1	4	4	Squad	Qualified as champions					
(Martinique) 2010	Did not qualify									3	1	1	1	3	5
(Antigua and Barbuda) 2012	Third place	3rd	5	3	1	1	7	4	Squad	6	5	0	1	15	3
(Jamaica) 2014	Third place	3rd	4	2	1	1	7	5	Squad	3	1	2	0	6	4
(Martinique) 2017	Did not qualify									4	2	1	1	12	10
Total	2 Titles	11/25	43	22	9	12	71	59	—	52	34	10	8	138	45

*Draws include knockout matches decided via penalty shoot-out.

=== CCCF Championship ===
CCCF Championship record
Year	Result	Position	Pld	W	D*	L	GF	GA
1941 to 1955	Did not participate							
(Netherlands Antilles) 1957	Champions	1st	4	4	0	0	14	4
(Honduras) 1960	Withdrew							
(Costa Rica) 1961	Fourth place	4th	6	3	0	3	8	17
Total	1 Title	2/10	10	7	0	3	22	21

=== Pan American Games ===
Pan American Games record
Year	Result	Position	Pld	W	D*	L	GF	GA
(Argentina) 1951	Did not participate							
(Mexico) 1955	Did not participate							
(United States) 1959	Fourth place	4th	6	3	0	3	19	20
(Brazil) 1963	Did not participate							
(Canada) 1967	Did not participate							
(Colombia) 1971	Group stage	6th	3	0	2	1	4	5
(Mexico) 1975	Did not participate							
(Puerto Rico) 1979	Withdrew from qualifiers							
(Venezuela) 1983	Did not participate							
(United States) 1987	Did not participate							
(Cuba) 1991	Group stage	5th	3	1	1	1	13	8
(Argentina) 1995	Did not participate							
Since 1999	Youth teams participated							
Total	Fourth place	3/12	12	4	3	5	36	33

== Honours ==
=== Continental ===
- CONCACAF Championship
  - Champions (1): 1973
  - (silver) Runners-up (2): 1971, 1977

=== Subcontinental / Regional ===
- CCCF Championship (Note: Competition organized by CCCF, the former subcontinental confederation affiliated with FIFA as the governing body for football in Central America and Caribbean (1938–1961), and a direct predecessor of CONCACAF.)
  - (gold) Champions (1): 1957
- CFU Championship / Caribbean Cup
  - (gold) Champions (2): 1979, 2007
  - (silver) Runners-up (1): 2001
  - (bronze) Third place (5): 1978, 1998, 1999, 2012, 2014

=== Friendly / Regional ===
- Paul Magloire President Cup (1): 1956
- Triangular Tournament (1): 1956
- Coupe Duvalier (1): 1966
- Haiti International Tournament (1): 1997
- Saint Kitts and Nevis Football Festival (1): 2003

=== Summary ===
Honours in competitions directly organized or recognized by FIFA or an affiliated confederation.

Competition	1st place, gold medalist(s)	2nd place, silver medalist(s)	3rd place, bronze medalist(s)	Total
CONCACAF Championship	1	2	0	3
CCCF Championship	1	0	0	1
Total	2	2	0	4

== See also ==
- Football in Haiti
- Haitian Football Federation
- Haiti national under-23 football team
- Haiti national under-20 football team
- Haiti national under-17 football team
- Haiti national under-15 football team
- Haiti at the FIFA World Cup
- Ligue Haïtienne
