= Sportpark Oberwerth =

Sports complex in Koblenz, Germany

Coordinates: 50°19′54″N 7°35′12″E

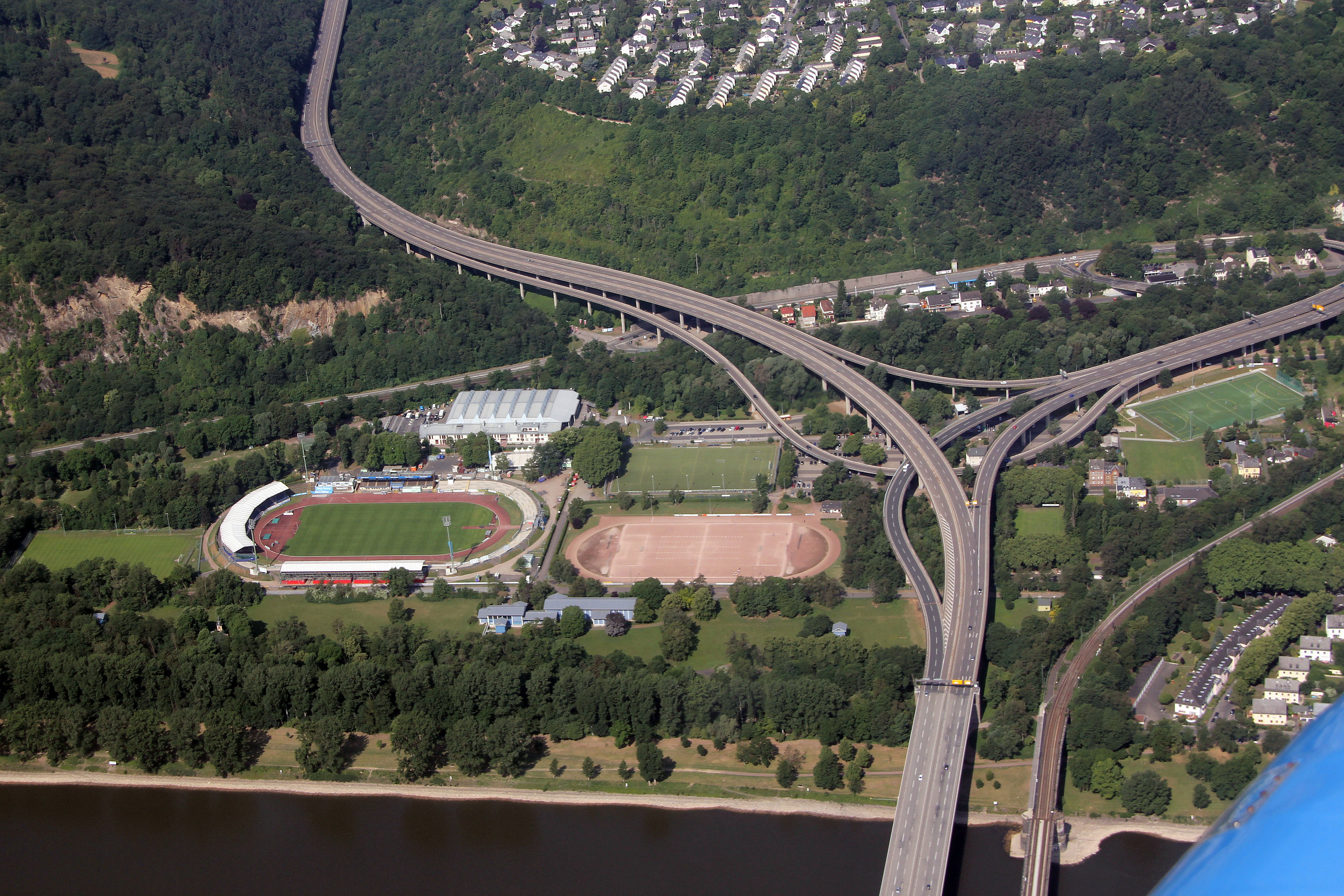
- Interactive map of Sportpark Oberwerth
- Location: Koblenz, Germany

Construction
- Renovated: 1998

Sportpark Oberwerth is a sports complex in Koblenz, Germany. It consists of Stadion Oberwerth and Conlog Arena.
