= Jean-Claude Josaphat =

Haitian football manager (born 1965)

Personal information
- Date of birth: 8 May 1965 (age 61)
- Place of birth: Haiti

Managerial career
- Years: Team
- AS Mirebalais
- 2016–2017: Haiti

Jean-Claude Josaphat (born 8 May 1965) is a Haitian former football manager.

== Early life ==
Josaphat was born in 1965 in Haiti. He retired from playing football due to a knee injury.

== Career ==
Josaphat managed Haitian side AS Mirebalais. In 2016, he was appointed manager of the Haiti national football team. He managed the team for the 2017 CONCACAF Gold Cup qualification.

== Personal life ==
Josaphat is a native of Mirebalais, Haiti. He has three older siblings.
