= Metin Türel =

Turkish footballer (1937–2018)

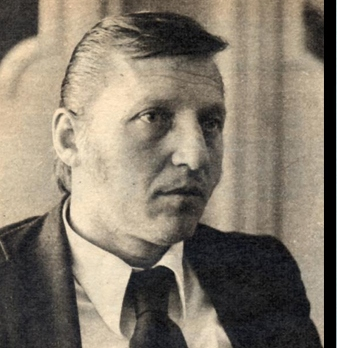

Personal information
- Full name: Ibrahim Metin Türel
- Date of birth: 13 September 1937
- Place of birth: Turkey
- Date of death: 17 November 2018 (aged 81)
- Position: Goalkeeper

Youth career
- Galatasaray

Senior career*
Years	Team	Apps	(Gls)
195?–60	Galatasaray		
1960–61	PTT	32	(0)
1961–62	İstanbulspor	9	(0)
1962–63	PTT	20	(0)
1963–65	İstanbulspor	37	(0)
1965–66	Vefa	8	(0)
1966–67	Taksim SK		

Managerial career
- 1969: Vefa
- 1970–71: Vefa
- 1973–74: Beşiktaş
- 1977–78: Turkey
- 1980: Beşiktaş
- 1982–83: Zonguldakspor
- 1983–84: Karagümrük
- 1986–87: Gençlerbirliği
- 1987–88: Trabzonspor
- 1988–89: Adana Demirspor
- 1990: Gençlerbirliği
- 1990: Saudi Arabia
- 1991: Rwanda
- 1992–93: Antalyaspor
- 1993–94: Adana Demirspor
- 1994–95: Gençlerbirliği
- 1995–96: Antalyaspor
- 1996: Gençlerbirliği
- 1997–98: Adana Demirspor
- 1998–99: Samsunspor
- 2000–01: İstanbulspor
- 2004–05: Antalyaspor
- * Club domestic league appearances and goals

Metin Türel (13 September 1937 – 17 November 2018) was a Turkish football player and coach. Türel coached many teams in Turkey, including the Turkey national team from 1977 to 1978. He started his professional career with Galatasaray and also played for PTT, İstanbulspor, Vefa and Taksim SK as a goalkeeper.
