= David Badía =

Spanish association football player and manager

Personal information
- Full name: David Badía Cequier
- Date of birth: 4 September 1974 (age 52)
- Place of birth: Gavà, Spain
- Height: 1.72 m (5 ft 8 in)
- Position: Centre back

Team information
- Current team: Haiti (head coach)

Youth career
- Gavà

Senior career*
Years	Team	Apps	(Gls)
1993–1995	Gavà		
1995–1999	Europa		
1999–2000	Gavà		
2000–2001	Premià		
2001–2003	Sturm Graz	0	(0)
2003	Sturm Graz II	1	(1)
2004	Europa		

Managerial career
- 2012–2016: Barcelona (youth)
- 2017: Antalyaspor (caretaker)
- 2017–2018: Antalyaspor (caretaker)
- 2021–2022: Ethnikos Achna
- 2022: AEK Larnaca
- 2022: Akritas Chlorakas
- 2023: Lechia Gdańsk
- 2024–2025: Ethnikos Achna
- 2026–: Haiti
- * Club domestic league appearances and goals

David Badía Cequier (born 4 September 1974) is a Spanish professional football manager and former player who played as a defender. He is currently in charge of the Haiti national team.

== Career ==
Badía began his career playing for football teams in the Catalonia region of Spain, featuring for each of CF Gavà, CE Europa, and CE Premià. He then spent two seasons playing in Austria with Sturm Graz, before returning to Spain to play with CE Europa.

Badía began coaching with FC Barcelona, holding managerial and directorial roles within the Barcelona youth department from 2012 to 2016. His first senior management role came with the Turkish side Antalyaspor, when Badía, who was the assistant manager, took over as the club's interim manager for five games between 2017 and 2018. After serving as an assistant in Fenerbahçe and UD Almería, he took up managerial roles in Cyprus, leading Ethnikos Achna, AEK Larnaca, and Akritas Chlorakas in short spells between 2021 and 2022.

On 21 March 2023, Badía became the manager of Polish side Lechia Gdańsk, replacing Marcin Kaczmarek. Placed 17th at the time of Badía's appointment, Lechia was not able to avoid relegation from Ekstraklasa after recording just one win and two draws in nine games. On 29 May 2023, it was announced that Badía would leave the club at the end of June.

On 23 August 2026, Badía took charge of the Haiti national team.
