= Jozef Jarabinský =

Footballer (born 1944)

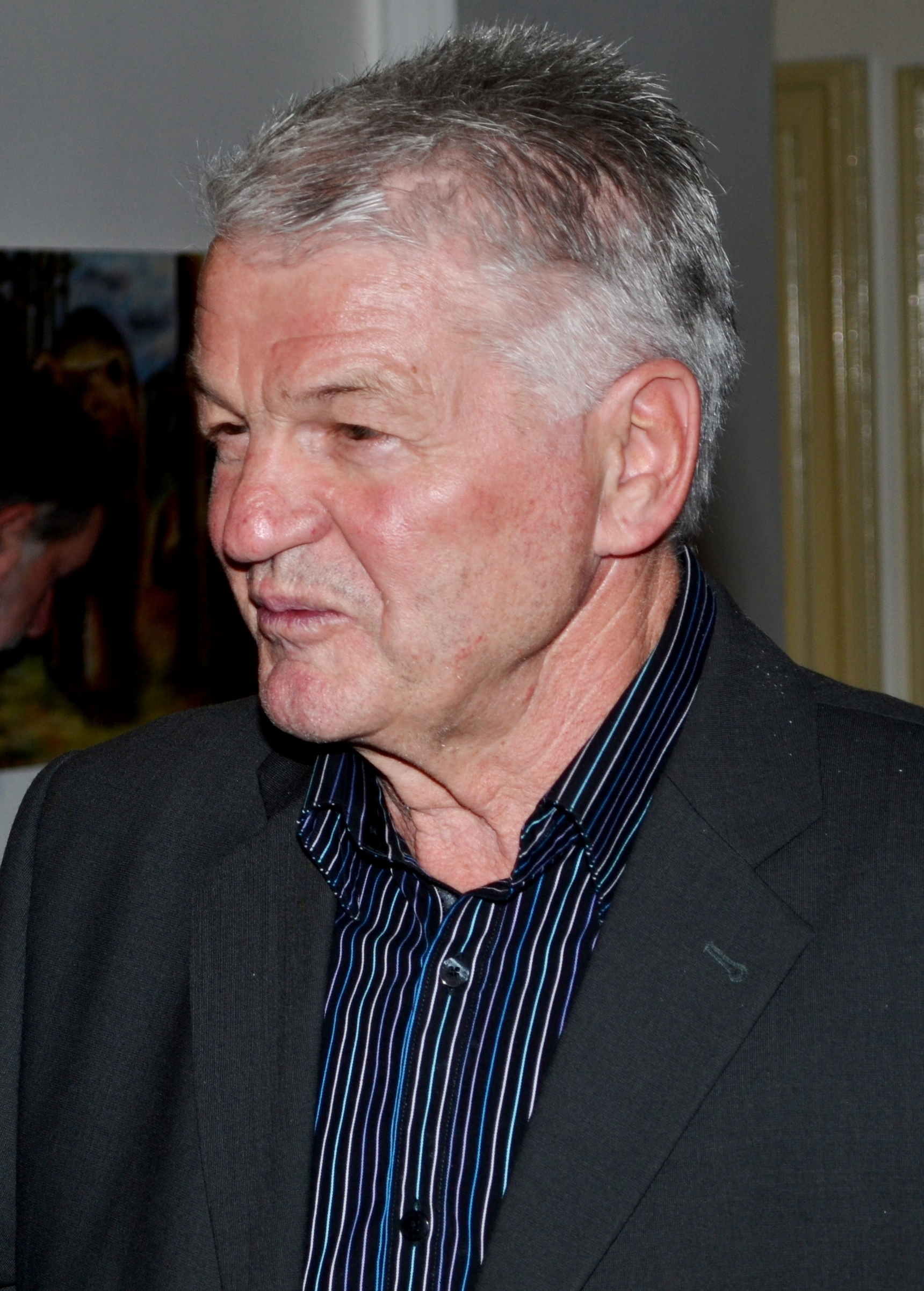
- Jarabinský in 2013

Personal information
- Date of birth: 12 March 1944 (age 82)
- Place of birth: Jarabina, Slovakia
- Position: Striker

Youth career
- 19??–1960: Tatran Prešov
- 1960–1962: Slovan Bratislava
- 1962–1964: Bohemians Prague

Senior career*
Years	Team	Apps	(Gls)
1964–1968	Bohemians Prague		
1968–1969	Dukla Prague		
1969–1971	Sparta Prague		
1971–1973	SONP Kladno		
1973–1974	Meteor Prague		

Managerial career
- 1974–1983: Sparta Prague (Youth)
- 1983–1984: Vagónka Poprad
- 1984–1985: Tatran Prešov
- 1985–1986: Plastika Nitra
- 1986–1988: Sparta Prague (Assistant coach)
- 1988–1990: Sparta Prague
- 1990–1991: Gençlerbirliği
- 1991–1992: Real Betis
- 1992–1993: Slavia Prague
- 1994: Union Cheb
- 1995: Sparta Prague
- 1996: Aris Thessaloniki
- 1996–1997: MKE Ankaragücü
- 1997–1998: Samsunspor
- 1998–1999: Antalyaspor
- 1999–2000: Göztepe Izmir
- 2001–2002: Baník Ostrava
- 2002: Sparta Prague
- 2004–2005: Baník Ostrava
- 2007–2008: Tianjin Teda
- 2008: Antalyaspor
- * Club domestic league appearances and goals

Jozef Jarabinský (born 12 March 1944) is a Czechoslovak former football player and manager

He played for Slovan Bratislava, Bohemians, Dukla Prague and Sparta Prague.

As a football manager he coached Vagónka Poprad, Tatran Prešov, Sparta Prague, Slavia Prague (1992–93), Baník Ostrava (2001–02, 2004–05), Real Betis, Gençlerbirliği S.K. (1990–1991), Ankaragücü, Antalyaspor, Samsunspor, Izmir, Aris Thessaloniki F.C. and Tianjin Teda F.C. (2008).
