= Antalyaspor =

Turkish association football club

- Full name: Antalyaspor Kulübü A.Ş.
- Nickname: Akrepler (The Scorpions)
- Founded: 2 July 1966; 60 years ago
- Ground: Antalya Stadium
- Capacity: 29,307
- Coordinates: 36°53′17.8″N 30°40′06.4″E
- President: Mustafa Ergün
- Head coach: Osman Özköylü
- League: TFF 1. Lig
- 2025–26: Süper Lig, 16th of 18 (relegated)
- Website: antalyaspor.com.tr
Home colours	Away colours	Third colours

Antalyaspor Kulübü, also known as Hesap.com Antalyaspor for sponsorship reasons since 2025, is a Turkish professional multi-sport club based in Antalya, on Turkey's Mediterranean coast. Founded on 2 July 1966 through the merger of three local sides Yenikapı Suspor, İlk Işık and Ferrokromspor. The club's football branch is best known by its nickname “Akrepler” (Scorpions) and currently competes in the TFF 1. Lig, the second tier of Turkish football.

Antalyaspor's home ground is the Antalya Stadium, a fully covered, 29,307-seat arena opened in 2015 whose rooftop solar array generates enough power to offset the venue's entire monthly electricity use. The club's colours are the city's traditional red and white, and its crest incorporates Antalya's historic Yivli Minare mosque.

Domestically, the Antalyaspor have won the TFF First League (second tier) twice (1981–82 and 1985–86) and finished runners-up in the Turkish Cup in 2000 and 2021 the latter campaign also earning a Turkish Super Cup appearance. Antalyaspor first reached European competition via the 1997 UEFA Intertoto Cup and have since featured in the UEFA Cup.

Beyond football, Antalyaspor maintains departments in athletics, volleyball, basketball, swimming and several martial arts, reflecting its charter as a citywide sporting association.

== History ==
=== Foundation ===
Following the establishment of a national football league in Turkey and the growing public interest in the sport, local leagues were abolished and national leagues began to take shape. With the directive issued by the Turkish Football Federation in 1965 for each province to have a team, various local football clubs across Turkey merged to represent their respective cities in national competitions.

This momentum also reached Antalya, prompting the Regional Advisory Board of the Antalya Regional Directorate of Physical Education to take action. On 5 June 1966, the directors of the clubs Yenikapı Suspor, İlk Işık, and Ferrokromspor convened with the intention of establishing Antalyaspor. These clubs dissolved their legal entities and declared their participation in the foundation of Antalyaspor.

Shortly after, a board of directors was formed by founding members as outlined in Article 2 of the statute published in the local newspaper İleri Gazetesi. Antalyaspor was officially registered and recognized by the authorities on 2 July 1966.

=== 1966–1989: Early Years and Rise to Top Flight ===
Antalyaspor entered professional football in the 1966–67 season, joining the Red Group of the Turkish Second Division (2. Lig). Between 1966 and 1970, the club played 134 matches, recording 53 wins, 45 draws, and 46 losses, with a win rate of 39.55% and an overall success rate of 56.71%. The club played its first professional match on 11 November 1966 against Edirnespor, which ended 1–1. Yalçın Demir scored the club's first-ever goal in professional football. After a mid-table start, Antalyaspor gradually improved its standings, finishing 11th, 4th, 5th, and 6th across the four seasons. The team reached the 2nd stage of the Turkish Cup during the 1968–69 campaign.

Throughout the 1970s, Antalyaspor mostly remained a mid-table team, struggling to establish consistent form. From the 1970–71 to 1979–80 seasons, they played 302 matches with 104 wins, 95 draws, and 103 losses achieving a win rate of 34.43% and an overall success rate of 50.15%. The club's best league finishes were two 3rd-place standings in the 1978–79 and 1979–80 seasons. In the Turkish Cup, Antalyaspor reached the fourth round (4. Kademe) twice during this decade.

The 1980s marked a turning point. Antalyaspor competed in the Second Division for most of the decade, but their performances improved significantly compared to previous years. Between 1980 and 1990, they played 332 matches, winning 139, drawing 75, and losing 118 — with a 41.86% win rate and a 53.15% success rate. In the 1981–82 season, Antalyaspor won the Second Division Group B, securing promotion to the First Division for the first time in club history. The decisive match against Karşıyaka, held on 10 April 1982 at İzmir Atatürk Stadium, ended 0–0, sealing promotion. Their debut in the top flight came in the 1982–83 season, where they drew their first match against Fenerbahçe. However, after only one season, the club was relegated. Antalyaspor spent most of the late ’80s vying for promotion again. The club finished 2nd in 1986–87, securing a return to the First Division. In the following seasons, they finished 3rd and 4th, remaining competitive and close to promotion. In the Turkish Cup, the club made it as far as the 5th round in 1983 and 1986.

=== 1990–2009: From Instability to European Breakthrough ===
The 1990s were a decade of fluctuation for Antalyaspor, bouncing between the First and Second Divisions. They played ten seasons across both tiers six in the top flight, four in the lower and reached their first European competitions and Turkish Cup final. After a rough start in the early ’90s, the club finished second in the 1991–92 Second Division and missed promotion narrowly. A brief stint in the Third Division followed, where promotion was secured in 1994 after winning playoff matches against Denizlispor and İstanbulspor.

Antalyaspor's return to the First Division brought its best league finishes at the time. The club placed 5th in both 1994–95 and 1996–97, earning qualification to the UEFA Intertoto Cup marking their European debut. During this period, they consistently remained mid-table but competitive, including wins over major Turkish sides. Off the pitch, the football branch was transferred to Antalyaspor A.Ş. in 1998, restructuring club operations. The decade ended on a high: a Turkish Cup final appearance in 2000, which they lost to Galatasaray, and qualification for the UEFA Cup — their first ever entry into Europe's main competition.

Antalyaspor opened the 2000s with their first-ever UEFA Cup appearance, eliminating Kapaz before being knocked out by Werder Bremen. Domestically, the club struggled with consistency and was relegated from the Süper Lig in 2001. The following years in the lower divisions were marked by instability, including frequent coaching changes and mid-table finishes. A notable low came in 2004 when they ended the season 13th in the Second Division. However, by 2005–06, Antalyaspor secured promotion after finishing second and returned to the Süper Lig.

The club was again relegated in 2006–07 after a poor season, but bounced back immediately by finishing second in the 2007–08 First League, earning another promotion. They also reached the Turkish Cup quarterfinals. Under coach Mehmet Özdilek, Antalyaspor saw improved stability. In 2008–09, they finished 12th in the Süper Lig and reached the cup quarterfinals. The 2009–10 season was one of their strongest performances to date, finishing 9th with a +11 goal difference and reaching the semi-finals of the Turkish Cup, where they lost to Trabzonspor.

=== 2010–2024: Return to the Top, Star Signings, and Cup Runs ===
Antalyaspor's modern era began with turbulent Süper Lig performances and a brief relegation in 2014. They returned to the top flight after winning the 2014–15 promotion playoffs, defeating Adana Demirspor and Samsunspor. Momentum built with the 2015 signing of global star Samuel Eto’o, who scored 20 goals and guided the club to a 9th-place finish. A record-breaking 7–0 win over Trabzonspor highlighted the season. Under Rıza Çalımbay, the 2016–17 campaign became their most successful of the decade, finishing 5th, with Eto’o netting 18 goals.

In the 2020–21 season, which featured 21 teams, the red-and-white team appointed Ersun Yanal as head coach midway through the season and finished 16th in the league. Their greatest achievement that season was reaching the final of the Turkish Cup for the second time in the club's history. However, they were defeated 2–0 by Beşiktaş in the final. On 5 January 2022 Antalyaspor also qualified for the 2021 Turkish Super Cup against Beşiktaş, which was held in Doha, the capital of Qatar. The match ended 1–1 after regular and extra time, but Antalyaspor lost 4–2 on penalties, failing to secure their first-ever Super Cup title.

On 5 October 2021, Nuri Şahin Appointed as player-coach at age 33, Şahin hung up his boots two weeks later to focus solely on management. He junked the counter-attacking setup, switching to a possession-heavy 4–1-4–1/4–3–3 that builds short from the back and presses high once the ball is lost. The change transformed results: between February and May 2022 Antalyaspor strung together a club-record 16-match unbeaten run (10 wins, 6 draws), including a 2–2 away draw with eventual champions Trabzonspor and a run-extending win over Konyaspor that drew national headlines. Şahin's side finished the 2021–22 season 7th with 59 points—both all-time highs for the club and reached the Turkish Cup quarter-finals, falling to Trabzonspor. Key contributors were US striker Haji Wright (14 league goals), deep-lying playmaker Fernando Lucas Martins, and breakout winger Doğukan Sinik, all thriving in Şahin's front-foot system. Momentum stalled the following season amid injuries and a thin squad, yet the team still collected 41 points before Şahin left in December 2023 to join Borussia Dortmund's staff; he became their head coach the following June. The following seasons brought more stability. Antalyaspor finished 13th in 2022–23 and 10th in 2023–24 under new manager Sergen Yalçın, again reaching the last 16 of the Turkish Cup in both years. As of 2024, the team continues aiming for consistent top-half finishes in the Süper Lig.

== Supporters ==
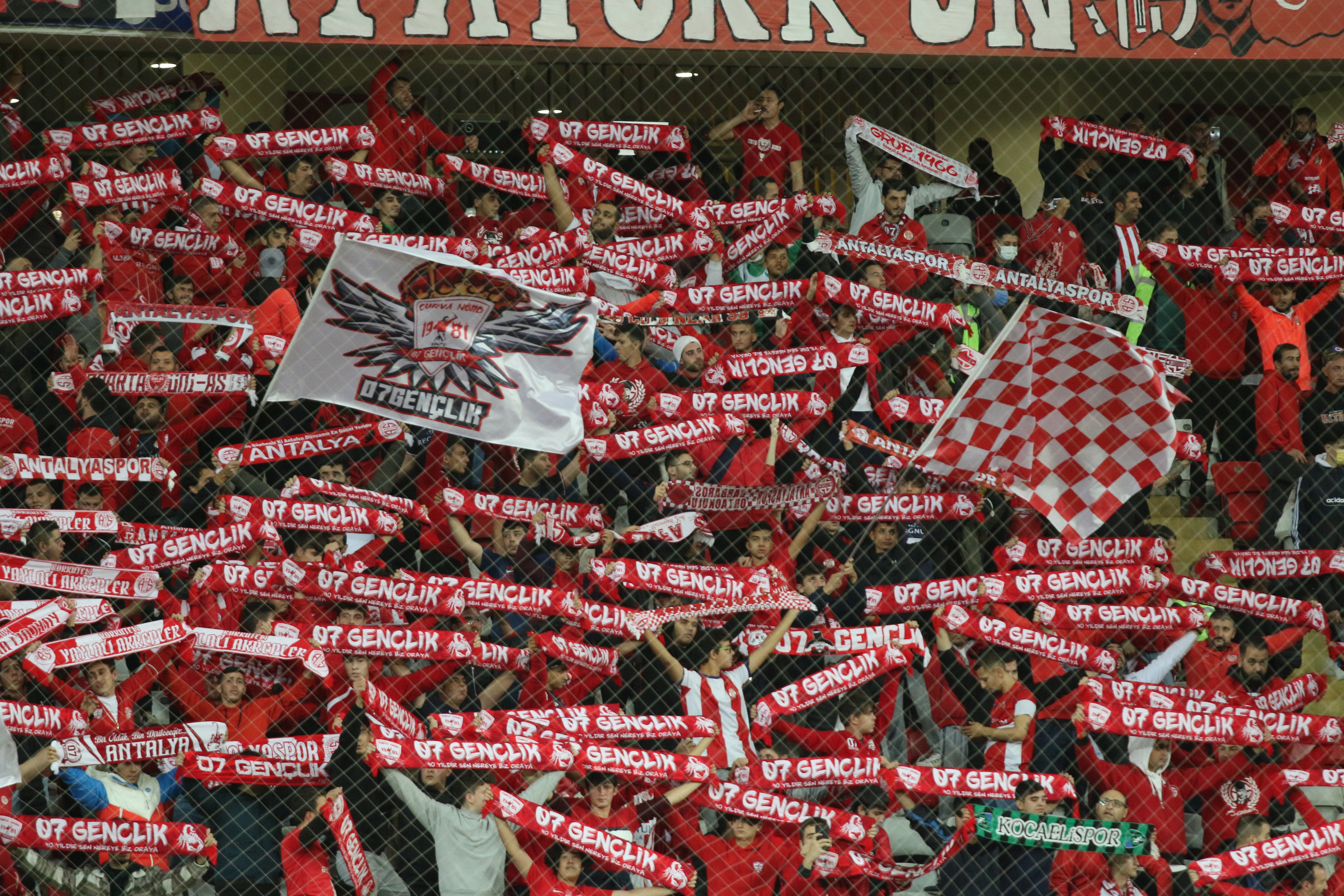
Antalyaspor supporters

Antalyaspor's core fan base is led by 07 Gençlik (“07 Youth”), an officially registered supporters’ association founded in 1981 and often cited as the first legally recognised fan group in Turkish football. On match-days the group occupy the Kuzey Kale Arkası (North Stand) of Antalya Stadium, where they organise large tifos, drum-led chants and pre-kick-off pyrotechnic displays.

Average home crowds have grown steadily since the new ground opened in 2015; Antalyaspor drew ≈11,100 per game in the 2023–24 Süper Lig season, ranking mid-table in national attendance charts. The club has made accessibility a priority, working with 07 Gençlik to install wheelchair platforms and improved access routes in the North Stand.

== Rivalries ==
Antalyaspor's principal derby is with fellow Antalya-province club Alanyaspor. The matchup is branded the Akdeniz Derbisi (“Mediterranean Derby”) in Turkish media and is listed by the Turkish Football Federation among the country's provincial rivalries.

The rivalry intensified after Alanyaspor won promotion to the Süper Lig via the 2016 play-off final, giving Antalya Province two top-flight sides for the first time. Since Alanyaspor's 2014 ascent to the professional leagues, the clubs have met 28 times in all competitions: Antalyaspor lead with 12 wins, Alanyaspor have 9, and 7 matches were drawn (goal tally 34-34). The first top-tier derby was played on 20 August 2016 at Antalya Stadium and ended 2–1 to Antalyaspor; the largest margin so far is Antalyaspor's 3–0 home victory on 27 November 2021. The rivals have also clashed twice in the Turkish Cup semi-finals. Alanyaspor progressed in the 2020 tie, while the 2021 edition was hyped nationally as a “Mediterranean derby” semi after both clubs upset Istanbul giants en route.

Derby fixtures routinely sell out Antalya Stadium and Alanya Oba Stadium, with Antalyaspor's 07 Gençlik occupying the North Stand in Antalya and Alanyaspor's Şehri Alanya group leading the south-coast club's support. Both ultras are known for choreographed tifos and reciprocal banner exchanges, but large-scale violence is rare; provincial police deploy extra units mainly for traffic management.

== Colors and Crest ==
=== Colors ===
The meaning of the club's colors is explained in the Antalyaspor Club Statute as follows: "The white color represents cleanliness and sincerity. Together with red, it embodies our national colors. It also signifies the love among the people of Antalya. One of the founding teams of Antalyaspor, İlk Işıkspor, was composed of executives from upper-income levels. The İlk Işıkspor group, which also held significant influence in Antalyaspor's management, insisted on using green and red colors before the meeting to determine the club's colors.

The club's first president, Atilla Konuk, was in favor of red and white colors. Atilla Konuk preferred red and white because they were also the colors of the Turkey national team and believed these colors would create sympathy for the team during away matches, as they matched the colors of the military. However, he needed to find a way to convince the board of directors of his idea.

Konuk noticed that red and white were the most commonly used colors among sports clubs in Antalya at the time. During the meeting, President Konuk argued that instead of adopting the colors of İlk Işıkspor, which appealed to a wealthy elite, the club should choose colors representing all of Antalya. He demonstrated that most clubs in Antalya used red and white, proposing these as the team's colors. The board of directors supported this proposal, and Antalyaspor's colors were officially decided as red and white.

=== Crest ===
The club's emblem consists of a red frame and lines on a white circular background. The letter A in the emblem represents the word "Antalya", while the letter S stands for "sport". In the center of the letters A and S is a red-lined depiction of the Yivli Minaret, one of the city's symbols. The three white bands on the Yivli Minaret represent the three teams—İlk Işıkspor, Ferrokromspor, and Yenikapı Suspor—that formed Antalyaspor. Below the Yivli Minaret illustration is the year 1966, which marks the establishment of Antalyaspor.

The creator of Antalyaspor's emblem is also its first president, Atilla Konuk, who decided the club's colors. During the management board discussions about the emblem, suggestions included featuring symbolic structures of the city like Aspendos or Hadrian’s Gate. President Atilla Konuk intervened, stating that the emblem should include a structure left by the Turks, not from Ancient Greece.

The first idea that came to mind was the Yivli Minaret, a Seljuk-era structure located in the center of Antalya. Atilla Konuk’s design for an emblem featuring the Yivli Minaret in the center was accepted by the board of directors. Although the emblem has undergone several design changes over the years, its essential elements have remained the same.

=== Kit suppliers and shirt sponsors ===
Period	Kit manufacturer	Shirt sponsor
1993–1998	adidas	–
1998–2000	Uhlsport	IMZA
2000–2003	Puma	Antsu
2003–2005	Uhlsport	Adopen
2005–2008	adidas	Turkcell
2008–2009	Nike	Mardan
2009–2012	Puma	SunExpress
2012–2014	Puma	Odeon Tours
2014–2015	Lescon	Iati
2015–2020	Nike	Regnum
2020–2021	Kappa	–
2021–2022	New Balance	Bitexen
2022–2023	Nike	VavaCars
2023–2024	Nike	Çağlayan Grup
2024–	adidas	–

== Stadium ==
Antalyaspor's first permanent home was Antalya Atatürk Stadium, a 12,453-seat ground completed in 1965. After decades of service and one major refurbishment in 2007 the venue was condemned for safety reasons in 2010 and demolished six years later. During the 2009–10 campaign the club staged Süper Lig fixtures at the nearby Mardan Sports Complex in Aksu (capacity 7,400) while searching for a longer-term solution. The stop-gap choice proved unpopular with supporters, so from 2012 until mid-2015 Antalyaspor instead shared the Akdeniz University Stadium (7,083 seats) on the city's main campus.

Ground was broken in 2013 for a purpose-built, all-seater arena on 100. Yıl Boulevard. Officially opened in September 2015, the Antalya Stadium marketed since 2023 as Corendon Airlines Park holds 32,537 spectators and meets UEFA Category 4 specifications. Its 12,000 m^{2} rooftop solar array generates roughly 7.2 MWh per day, making the venue energy-self-sufficient and one of the most sustainable stadiums in Turkey. Locals commonly call the ground “100. Yıl”(“Centenary”) after the boulevard that borders its southern stand.

== Honours ==
- 1. Lig (second tier)
  - Champions: 1981–82, 1985–86
  - Play-off winners: 2014–15
  - Runners-up: 2005–06, 2007–08
- Turkish Cup
  - Runners-up: 1999–2000, 2020–21
- Turkish Super Cup
  - Runners-up: 2021

== Statistics ==
=== Results of League and Cup Competitions by Season ===
Season	League table										Turkish Cup	UEFA	Top scorer	
Season	League	Pos	P	W	D	L	GF	GA	GD	Pts	Turkish Cup	UEFA	Player	Goals
1966–67	1. Lig	11th	32	12	5	15	33	41	−8	29	R1	DNQ	N/A	
1967–68	1. Lig	4th	38	16	12	10	43	31	12	44	N/A	DNQ	N/A	
1968–69	1. Lig	5th	34	13	11	10	31	27	4	37	R2	DNQ	N/A	
1969–70	1. Lig	6th	30	12	7	11	30	35	–5	31	~~N/A.~~	DNQ	N/A	
1970–71	1. Lig	9th	30	11	7	12	28	33	–5	29	~~N/A.~~	DNQ	N/A	
1971–72	1. Lig	8th	30	10	8	12	23	25	–2	28	~~N/A.~~	DNQ	N/A	
1972–73	1. Lig	9th	30	8	13	9	21	26	–5	29	~~N/A.~~	DNQ	N/A	
1973–74	1. Lig	7th	30	11	10	9	22	22	0	32	~~N/A.~~	DNQ	N/A	
1974–75	1. Lig	10th	30	9	10	11	24	24	0	28	~~N/A.~~	DNQ	N/A	
1975–76	1. Lig	11th	30	9	10	11	33	45	–12	28	R4	DNQ	N/A	
1976–77	1. Lig	5th	30	10	12	8	28	21	+7	32	R1	DNQ	N/A	
1977–78	1. Lig	8th	32	12	7	13	33	28	+5	31	R2	DNQ	N/A	
1978–79	1. Lig	3rd	30	10	14	6	29	22	+7	34	R1	DNQ	N/A	
1979–80	1. Lig	3rd	30	14	4	12	38	26	+12	32	R2	DNQ	N/A	
1980–81	1. Lig	8th	34	12	9	13	39	33	+6	33	R3	DNQ	N/A	
1981–82	1. Lig	1st↑	28	17	9	2	45	11	+34	43	R6	DNQ	İsmail Göksu	5
1982–83	Süper Lig	14th	34	9	11	14	27	40	–13	29	R1	DNQ	Bekir Şalak	9
1983–84	Süper Lig	15th	34	10	9	15	34	38	–4	29	R2	DNQ	Bora Öztürk	13
1984–85	Süper Lig	17th↓	34	11	6	17	33	49	–16	28	R1	DNQ	Erol Dinler	9
1985–86	1. Lig	1st↑	34	22	8	4	60	20	+40	52	R3	DNQ	Bekir Kahraman	21
1986–87	Süper Lig	17th↓	36	8	8	20	37	68	–31	24	R1	DNQ	Bekir Kahraman	16
1987–88	1. Lig	2nd	32	15	10	7	57	39	+18	55	R1	DNQ	N/A	
1988–89	1. Lig	4th	34	18	6	10	72	42	+30	60	R2	DNQ	Erhan	26
1989–90	1. Lig	3rd	32	17	9	6	59	36	+23	60	R1	DNQ	Hasan Yıldırım	26
1990–91	1. Lig	14th	34	12	3	19	39	65	–26	39	R1	DNQ	Ahmet Kılıç	7
1991–92	1. Lig	2nd	34	21	8	5	68	29	+39	71	R1	DNQ	Halim Okta	14
1992–93	1. Lig	6th	18	5	6	7	19	18	+1	21	R1	DNQ	Levent Tekne	13
1993–94	1. Lig	6th↑	18	7	2	9	27	26	+1	23	R3	DNQ	Halim Okta	20
1994–95	Süper Lig	13th	34	10	8	16	39	46	–7	38	R1	DNQ	Kadir Durum	6
1995–96	Süper Lig	7th	34	13	6	15	45	55	–10	45	R2	DNQ	Fany Madida	11
1996–97	Süper Lig	10th	34	13	6	15	38	49	–11	45	R1	GS	Cafer Aydın	12
1997–98	Süper Lig	12th	34	10	11	13	51	55	–4	41	R2	GS	Andre Kona	15
1998–99	Süper Lig	6th	34	14	7	13	46	47	–1	49	R1	DNQ	Fazlı Ulusal	9
1999–00	Süper Lig	11th	34	11	8	15	42	58	–16	41	RU	DNQ	Fazlı Ulusal	22
2000–01	Süper Lig	15th	34	9	9	16	45	64	–19	36	R2	R1	Atilla Birlik	18
2001–02	Süper Lig	17th↓	34	9	10	15	46	61	–15	37	R1	DNQ	Saffet Akyüz	10
2002–03	1. Lig	11th	34	11	9	14	37	47	–10	42	R1	DNQ	Fazlı Ulusal	7
2003–04	1. Lig	7th	34	14	8	12	45	45	0	50	R2	DNQ	Fazlı Ulusal	10
2004–05	1. Lig	14th	34	9	10	15	42	45	–3	37	R2	DNQ	Taner Gülleri	17
2005–06	1. Lig	2nd↑	34	20	7	7	68	34	+34	67	R1	DNQ	Coşkun Birdal	18
2006–07	Süper Lig	16th↓	34	8	15	11	32	36	–4	39	R1	DNQ	Coşkun Birdal	9
2007–08	1. Lig	2nd↑	34	15	16	3	56	33	+23	61	R1	DNQ	Cenk İşler	19
2008–09	Süper Lig	12th	34	10	10	14	34	42	–8	40	QF	DNQ	Djiehoua	7
2009–10	Süper Lig	9th	34	14	7	13	49	38	+11	49	SF	DNQ	Necati Ateş	17
2010–11	Süper Lig	11th	34	10	12	12	41	48	–7	42	GS	DNQ	Necati Ateş	13
2011–12	Süper Lig	15th	34	10	9	15	38	44	–6	39	QF	DNQ	Tita	14
2012–13	Süper Lig	7th	34	14	5	15	50	52	–2	47	GS	DNQ	Lamine Diarra	18
2013–14	Süper Lig	17th↓	34	6	13	15	34	47	–13	31	SF	DNQ	Lamine Diarra	15
2014–15	1. Lig	5th↑	34	15	10	9	56	43	+13	55	R1	DNQ	Lamine Diarra	16
2015–16	Süper Lig	9th	34	12	9	13	46	49	–3	45	R16	DNQ	Samuel Eto'o	20
2016–17	Süper Lig	5th	34	17	5	12	47	40	+7	58	R1	DNQ	Samuel Eto'o	18
2017–18	Süper Lig	14th	34	10	8	16	40	59	–19	38	R16	DNQ	Deniz Kadah	6
2018–19	Süper Lig	7th	34	13	6	5	39	55	–16	45	R16	DNQ	Mevlüt Erdinç	14
2019–20	Süper Lig	9th	34	11	12	11	41	52	–11	45	SF	DNQ	Adis Jahović	7
2020–21	Süper Lig	16th	40	9	17	14	41	55	–14	44	RU	DNQ	Fredy	7
2021–22	Süper Lig	7th	38	16	11	11	54	47	7	59	QF	DNQ	Haji Wright	15
2022–23	Süper Lig	13th	36	11	8	17	46	56	–10	41	R16	DNQ	Haji Wright	16
2023–24	Süper Lig	10th	36	13	10	13	49	47	2	49	R16	DNQ	Adam Buksa	16
2024–25	Süper Lig	15th	36	12	8	16	37	62	–25	44	GS	DNQ	Adolfo Gaich	9
2025–26	Süper Lig	TBD												

=== League participations ===
- Süper Lig: 1982–85, 1986–87, 1994–02, 2006–07, 2008–14, 2015–
- 1. Lig: 1966–82, 1985–86, 1987–94, 2002–06, 2007–08, 2014–15

== Antalyaspor in Europe ==
Antalyaspor represented Turkey in European competitions in 1996, 1997, and 2000. The club participated in the UEFA Intertoto Cup in both 1996 and 1997, and qualified for the UEFA Cup in 2000 after finishing as runners-up in the 1999–2000 Turkish Cup Final against Galatasaray. To date, Antalyaspor have played a total of 12 matches in European competitions. Based on their league finishes in 1996 and 1997, Antalyaspor earned the right to compete in the UEFA Intertoto Cup. The format at the time featured five clubs per group, with only the group winners advancing. Antalyaspor finished third in their group in 1996 and fourth in 1997, thus failing to progress on both occasions. Across their two Intertoto Cup appearances, Antalyaspor played 8 matches, recording 3 wins, 1 draw, and 4 losses, scoring 9 goals and conceding 11.

After losing 5–3 in extra time to Galatasaray in the 1999–2000 Turkish Cup Final, and with Galatasaray qualifying for the UEFA Champions League, Antalyaspor were granted entry to the 2000–01 UEFA Cup qualifying round.

They defeated Azerbaijani side Kepez to reach the First Round, where they were drawn against German club Werder Bremen. Antalyaspor won the first leg 2–0 at home, but were eliminated after a 6–0 defeat in the second leg in Germany.

=== Summary ===
As of 28 September 2000

Competition	Pld	W	D	L	GF	GA	GD
UEFA Cup	4	3	0	1	9	6	+3
UEFA Intertoto Cup	8	3	1	4	9	11	–2
Total	12	6	1	5	18	17	+1

=== UEFA competition results ===
Season	Competition	Round	Club	Home	Away	Aggregate
1996	UEFA Intertoto Cup	GS; Group 7	(Russia) Rotor Volgograd	2–1	—N/a	3rd
1996	UEFA Intertoto Cup	GS; Group 7	(Switzerland) Basel	2–5	—N/a	3rd
1996	UEFA Intertoto Cup	GS; Group 7	(Ukraine) Shakhtar Donetsk	—N/a	0–1	3rd
1996	UEFA Intertoto Cup	GS; Group 7	(Belarus) Ataka-Aura Minsk	—N/a	3–0	3rd
1997	UEFA Intertoto Cup	GS; Group 11	(Russia) Nizhny Novgorod	—N/a	0–1	4th
1997	UEFA Intertoto Cup	GS; Group 11	(Slovenia) Publikum	—N/a	1–1	4th
1997	UEFA Intertoto Cup	GS; Group 11	(Federal Republic of Yugoslavia) Proleter Zrenjanin	1–0	—N/a	4th
1997	UEFA Intertoto Cup	GS; Group 11	(Israel) Maccabi Haifa	0–2	—N/a	4th
2000–01	UEFA Cup	QR	(Azerbaijan) Kapaz	5–0	2–0	7–0
2000–01	UEFA Cup	R1	(Germany) Werder Bremen	2–0	0–6	2–6

=== UEFA Ranking history ===
Season	Rank	Points	Ref.
2001	133 ▲	16.987	
2002	143 ▼	16.362	
2003	152 ▼	16.495	
2004	155 ▼	12.656	
2005	164 ▼	11.872	

== Players ==
=== Current squad ===
As of 28 September 2026

Note: Flags indicate national team as defined under FIFA eligibility rules; some limited exceptions apply. Players may hold more than one non-FIFA nationality.

No.	Pos.	Nation	Player
1	GK	ESP	Julián Cuesta
3	DF	SUR	Kenneth Paal
4	DF	TUR	Ensar Buğra Tivsiz
5	MF	TUR	Ömer Faruk Beyaz
6	MF	TUR	Soner Dikmen
7	DF	TUR	Bünyamin Balcı
8	MF	ISR	Ramzi Safouri
9	FW	CPV	Nuno da Costa
11	DF	TUR	Güray Vural
13	GK	TUR	Doğukan Özkan
14	MF	POR	Pedrinho
15	DF	CGO	Francis Nzaba
16	MF	TUR	Ufuk Akyol
17	DF	TUR	Erdoğan Yeşilyurt
18	MF	TUR	Samet Yalçın
19	DF	TUR	Samet Karakoç
20	MF	TUR	Yakub İlçin

No.	Pos.	Nation	Player
21	GK	TUR	Abdullah Yiğiter
22	MF	NED	Sander van de Streek
23	FW	TUR	Ahmet Sağat
24	FW	SEN	Bachir Gueye
27	DF	TUR	Mert Yılmaz
35	MF	GAM	Jesper Ceesay
43	DF	TUR	Arif Kocaman
44	MF	ALG	Ismail Taïeb Chehaima
70	FW	TUR	Doğukan Sinik
77	GK	GRE	Fotios Pseftis (on loan from Lugano)
81	FW	TUR	Arda Altun
88	MF	BIH	Dario Šarić
89	DF	TUR	Veysel Sarı (captain)
92	MF	TUR	Hasan Ürkmez
97	FW	TUR	Mevlüt Şimşek
98	DF	TUR	Ege İzmirli
99	GK	TUR	Kağan Arıcan

=== Out on loan ===
Note: Flags indicate national team as defined under FIFA eligibility rules; some limited exceptions apply. Players may hold more than one non-FIFA nationality.

No. / Pos. / Nation / Player; — / DF / TUR / Alp Ada Abay (at Elazığspor until 30 May 2027)	No. / Pos. / Nation / Player; — / FW / TUR / Taha Osman Özmert (at 52 Orduspor until 30 May 2027)

== Non-playing staff ==
=== Administrative Staff ===
Position	Name
President	(Turkey) Rıza Perçin
Vice-president	(Turkey) Hakan Kayaarası
Vice-president	(Turkey) Fatih Demirtop
Vice-president	(Turkey) Oktay Arı
Board Member	(Turkey) Ali Çan
Board Member	(Turkey) Mehmet Boztaş
Board Member	(Turkey) Emrah Çelik
Board Member	(Turkey) Hakan Onay
Board Member	(Turkey) Lokman Arslan
Board Member	(Turkey) Selçuk Kahraman
Board Member	(Turkey) Mehmet Hasan Güneysu
Board Member	(Turkey) Bülent Kaya
Board Member	(Turkey) Cesur Burak Akar
Board Member	(Turkey) Mehmet Bora
Board Member	(Turkey) Nail Öztürk
Board Member	(Turkey) Emir Ekmekçi
Board Member	(Turkey) Cihat Gökalp
Board Member	(Turkey) Serkan Sürer
Board Member	(Turkey) Ali Altınay
Board Member	(Turkey) Nebi Erdemsoy
Board Member	(Turkey) Haydar Ali Yıldırım
Board Member	(Turkey) Medeni Korkut
Board Member	(Turkey) Halil İbrahim Öcalan
Board Member	(Turkey) Avni Bağçalı
Board Member	(Turkey) Bilal Özkan
Board Member	(Turkey) Çağdaş Uslu
Board Member	(Turkey) Erkan Efeoğlu
Board Member	(Turkey) Kemal Yılmaz
Board Member	(Turkey) Serdar Kaya

=== Coaching staff ===
Position	Name
Head coach	(Turkey) Bülent Korkmaz
Assistant Coach	(Turkey) Alaattin Gülerce
Assistant Coach	(Greece) Nikolaos Karydas
Goalkeeper Coach	(Croatia) Mario Galinović
Performance Coach	(Turkey) Umut Furkan Can
Player Development	(Turkey) Önder Gülcan
Performance Analyst	(Turkey) Tolga Yalçın
Performance Analyst	(Turkey) Aykut Sincanlıoğlu
Team Manager	(Turkey) Tolga Tüzün
Interpreter	(Turkey) Murat Çoruk
Interpreter	(Turkey) Sinan Ummak
Doctor	(Turkey) Dr. Burhanettin Çalım
Dietitian	(Turkey) Aren Karal
Physiotherapist	(Turkey) İrfan Korkmaz
Physiotherapist	(Turkey) Harun Mete Koç
Physiotherapist	(Turkey) Doğukan Dere
Physiotherapist	(Turkey) Yavuz Arpacı
Masseur	(Turkey) Nuri Aslan
Masseur	(Turkey) M. Kamuran Polat
Masseur	(Turkey) Behçet Yılmaz

== Coaching history ==
Antalyaspor has seen a diverse mix of coaches over the decades, with Turkish managers dominating its history. The club's early years were marked by short-term appointments, but figures like Yılmaz Gökdel and Metin Türel brought more consistency. Foreign influence has occasionally shaped the team, with coaches like Valeriu Neagu, Jozef Jarabinský, and Rüdiger Abramczik leaving notable marks. In recent years, high-profile names such as Leonardo and Alex de Souza have added international flair. The club's most stable period came under Mehmet Özdilek, while modern icons like Nuri Şahin and Emre Belözoğlu symbolize a shift toward younger, domestic leadership.

Season(s)	Manager
1968	(Serbia) Aleksandar Petaković
1968–69	(Turkey) Lefter Küçükandonyadis
1972–73	(Turkey) Hamdi Serpil Tüzün
1976–78	(Turkey) Abdullah Matay
1978–79	(Turkey) Kamuran Soykıray
1980–81	(Turkey) Orhan Gülmez
1982–83	(Romania) Valeriu Neagu
1983	(Turkey) Orhan Gülmez
1983	(Germany) Peter Stubbe
1983–85	(Turkey) Yılmaz Gökdel
1984	(Turkey) Zeynel Soyuer
1985–86	(Turkey) Adnan Dinçer
1986	(Turkey) Rasim Kara
1986–88	(Turkey) Yılmaz Gökdel
1987–88	(Romania) Valeriu Neagu
1988–89	(Germany) Yılmaz Vural
1990–91	(Turkey) Necip Erdoğan
1991–92	(Turkey) Orhan Gülmez
1992	(Turkey) Metin Türel
1992–93	(Turkey) Adnan Dinçer
1993–94	(Turkey) Erdem Tuğral
1994	(Turkey) Adnan Dinçer
1994–95	(Turkey) Ahmet Akcan
1995–96	(Turkey) Metin Türel
1996–97	(Turkey) Ümit Kayihan
1997	(Turkey) Metin Ünal
1997–98	(Turkey) Şenol Güneş
1998–99	(Czech Republic) Jozef Jarabinský
1999–00	(Germany) Rüdiger Abramczik
2000–01	(Turkey) Metin Ünal
2001	(Turkey) Cezmi Turhan
2001	(Turkey) Hüseyin Kalpar
2001–02	(Turkey) Mehmet Ali Öztürk

Season(s)	Manager
2002	(Turkey) Giray Bulak
2002	(Turkey) Adnan Dinçer
2002–03	(Turkey) Tarık Söyleyici
2003–04	(Turkey) Coşkun Demirbakan
2004–05	(Turkey) Metin Türel
2005–07	(Germany) Yılmaz Vural
2007	(Turkey) Raşit Çetiner
2007–08	(Turkey) Ümit Turmuş
2008	(Turkey) Hikmet Karaman
2008	(Czech Republic) Jozef Jarabinský
2008–13	(Turkey) Mehmet Özdilek
2013–14	(Turkey) Samet Aybaba
2014	(Turkey) Fuat Çapa
2015	(Turkey) Yusuf Şimşek
2014	(Turkey) Engin Korukır
2014–15	(Turkey) Hami Mandıralı
2015–16	(Turkey) Mehmet Uğurlu
2015–16	(Cameroon) Samuel Eto'o (a.i.)
2016	(Portugal) José Morais
2016–17	(Turkey) Rıza Çalımbay
2017	(Spain) David Badía
2017	(Brazil) Leonardo Araújo
2017–18	(Spain) David Badía (a.i.)
2018	(Turkey) Hamza Hamzaoğlu
2018–19	(Turkey) Bülent Korkmaz
2019–20	(Croatia) Stjepan Tomas
2020	(Turkey) Tamer Tuna
2020–21	(Turkey) Ersun Yanal
2021–23	(Germany) Nuri Şahin
2024	(Turkey) Sergen Yalçın
2024–25	(Brazil) Alex de Souza
2025	(Turkey) Emre Belözoğlu
2025	(Turkey) Erol Bulut
2026	(Turkey) Sami Uğurlu
2026–	(Turkey) Bülent Korkmaz

== President history ==
Since its establishment, Antalyaspor has been led by a wide range of chairmen, primarily local figures from Antalya's political and business circles. The club's early leadership featured short and often undocumented terms, while later years brought more structured presidencies. Longest-serving names include Atilla Konuk and Hasan Subaşı, who oversaw key developments in the club's growth. More recently, figures like Ali Şafak Öztürk and Aziz Çetin have played prominent roles in modernizing the organization. On 18 July 2025, Rıza Perçin was unanimously elected as the new president of Antalyaspor during the club's General Assembly. His executive board was officially approved by the council and he formally assumed office.

Season(s)	President
1966	(Turkey) Atilla Konuk
–	(Turkey) Nedim Saraçoğlu
–	(Turkey) Abdurrahim Erdem
–	(Turkey) Tevfik Tugayoğlu
–	(Turkey) Ünsal Berberoğlu
1976–79	(Turkey) Özcan Kırmızıoğlu
1979	(Turkey) Orhan Uğur
–	(Turkey) Ahmet Uluç
–	(Turkey) Selahattin Tonguç
1981–83	(Turkey) Haşmet Şemsettin Tur
1983–87	(Turkey) Dündar Uluğkay
–	(Turkey) Metin Halim Horasan
–	(Turkey) Ahmet Yeşilyurt
–	(Turkey) Osman Doğaner
–	(Turkey) Ali Rıza Tekin
–	(Turkey) Atilla Ekmen
1989–99	(Turkey) Hasan Subaşı
1999	(Turkey) Ünal Öğer

Season(s)	President
1999	(Turkey) Erdoğan Tekin
1999–02	(Turkey) Bekir Kumbul
2002	(Turkey) Süleyman Arslan
2002–04	(Turkey) Menderes Türel
2004–05	(Turkey) Cihan Bulut
2005–08	(Turkey) Sedat Peker
2008–13	(Turkey) Hasan Akıncıoğlu
2013–16	(Turkey) Gültekin Gencer
2016–18	(Turkey) Ali Şafak Öztürk
2018	(Turkey) Cihan Bulut
2018–21	(Turkey) Ali Şafak Öztürk
2021	(Turkey) Mustafa Yılmaz
2021–23	(Turkey) Aziz Çetin
2023	(Turkey) Sabri Gülel
2023–25	(Turkey) Sinan Boztepe
2025–	(Turkey) Rıza Perçin

== Other sports ==
=== Swimming ===
Antalyaspor run one of Turkey's largest age-group swimming programmes, training more than 200 athletes at the Muratpaşa Süleyman Erol Pool. The club's most-decorated swimmer is Sevim Eylül Süpürgeci, bronze-medallist in the 4 × 200 m freestyle relay at the 2022 FINA World Junior Open-Water Championships in Lima. Another prospect, Emir Batur Albayrak (b. 2007), broke seven national age-group records at the 2023 Turkish long-course finals and was selected for the TYF national development squad.

=== Water polo ===
Antalyaspor established a men's water-polo section in 2010. Guided by veteran centre-back Turgut Kabaca, the team won the Turkish 3rd League (2011) and 2nd League (2012) titles in consecutive seasons, earning promotion to the top flight.

=== Handball ===
The club's women's handball branch competes under the name Konyaaltı BSK in the Turkish Women's Handball Super League. In May 2023 they defeated CB Atlético Guardés 50–43 on aggregate to win the EHF European Cup, becoming the first Turkish side—men or women—to lift a European handball trophy.

=== Basketball ===
Antalyaspor ran a men's basketball team that competed in the Turkish Basketball First League from 2017 until 2021, recording a best finish of 5th place in the 201–18 campaign before financial issues forced a withdrawal to the third tier. These departments operate under the club's multi-sport charter and share training facilities at Akdeniz University's indoor complex and the city-owned Süleyman Erol Aquatics Centre.
