= Stadion Oberwerth =

Stadium in Koblenz, Germany

Coordinates: 50°19′50″N 7°35′12″E

Stadion Oberwerth is a multi-use stadium in Koblenz, Germany, originally built in 1920. It is currently mostly used for football matches and is the home stadium of TuS Koblenz. TuS Koblenz is playing the 2015/16 season in the fourth German tier, the Regionalliga Südwest. The stadium has a total capacity of 9,500 people including 2,000 seats.

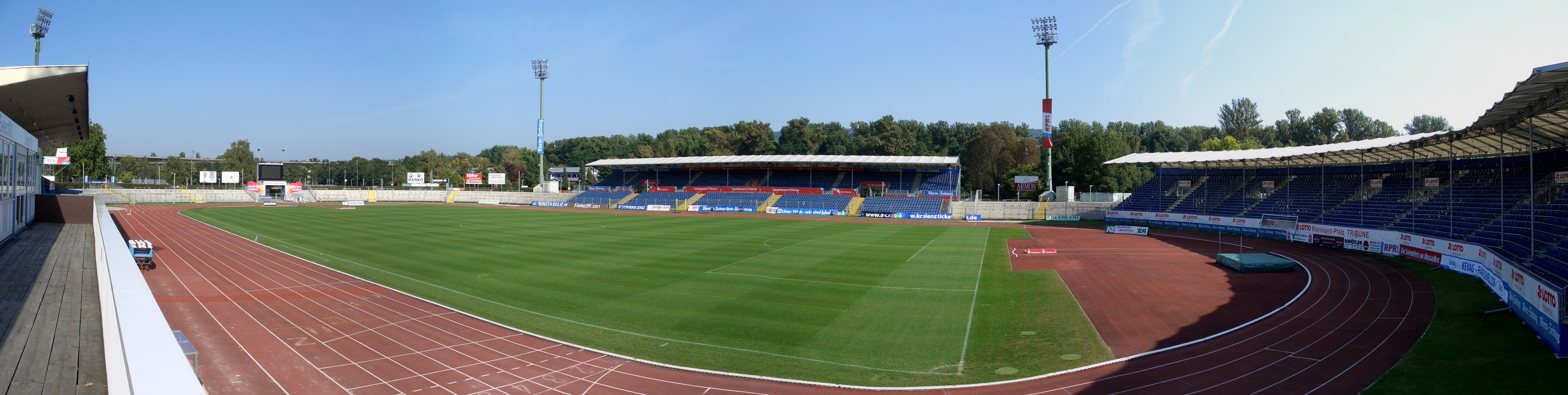
Stadion Oberwerth
