= 2014 Caribbean Cup squads =

Football tournament squads

The 2014 Caribbean Cup was an international football competition that took place from 11–18 November 2014. The competition was a qualifying tournament for the 2015 CONCACAF Gold Cup and Copa América Centenario.

== Group A ==
=== Cuba ===
Head coach: (Cuba) Walter Benítez

No.	Pos.	Player	Date of birth (age)	Club
1	GK	Diosvelis Guerra	21 May 1989 (aged 25)	(Football Association of Cuba) FC Pinar del Rio
2	MF	Orisbel Leiva		(Football Association of Cuba) FC Ciego de Avila
3	DF	Yenier Márquez	3 January 1979 (aged 35)	(Football Association of Cuba) FC Villa Clara
4	MF	Yasmany López	11 October 1987 (aged 27)	(Football Association of Cuba) FC Villa Clara
5	DF	Renay Malblanche	8 August 1991 (aged 23)	(Football Association of Cuba) FC Holguín
6	FW	Jesús Rodríguez	23 October 1988 (aged 26)	(Football Association of Cuba) FC Ciego de Avila
7	MF	Tomas Cruz	13 August 1981 (aged 33)	(Football Association of Cuba) FC Ciego de Avila
8	MF	Alberto Gómez	12 February 1988 (aged 26)	(Football Association of Cuba) FC Guantánamo
9	FW	José Ciprian Alfonso	28 March 1984 (aged 30)	(Football Association of Cuba) FC Pinar del Rio
10	MF	Ariel Martínez	9 May 1986 (aged 28)	(Football Association of Cuba) FC Sancti Spiritus
11	FW	Yoandir Puga	3 January 1988 (aged 26)	(Football Association of Cuba) FC Isla de La Juventud
12	GK	Arael Argüellez	30 April 1987 (aged 27)	(Football Association of Cuba) FC Cienfuegos
13	DF	Jorge Luis Corrales	20 May 1991 (aged 23)	(Football Association of Cuba) FC Villa Clara
14	FW	Armando Coroneaux	2 July 1985 (aged 29)	(Football Association of Cuba) FC Camagüey
15	MF	Yannier Martínez	28 May 1988 (aged 26)	(Football Association of Cuba) FC Villa Clara
16	DF	Hanier Dranguet	2 September 1982 (aged 32)	(Football Association of Cuba) FC Guantánamo
17	MF	Dayron Blanco	2 October 1992 (aged 22)	(Football Association of Cuba) FC Las Tunas
18	DF	Félix Guerra	14 January 1989 (aged 25)	(Football Association of Cuba) CF Granma
19	DF	Yennier Rosabal	2 June 1983 (aged 31)	(Football Association of Cuba) CF Granma
21	GK	Delvis Lumpuy	21 February 1994 (aged 20)	(Football Association of Cuba) FC Villa Clara

=== Curaçao ===
Head coach: (Curaçao) Etienne Sillie

No.	Pos.	Player	Date of birth (age)	Club
1	GK	Rowendy Sumter	19 March 1988 (aged 26)	(Curaçao Football Federation) Jong Holland
2	DF	Cuco Martina	25 September 1989 (aged 25)	(Royal Dutch Football Association) Twente
3	DF	Jason Wall	10 December 1991 (aged 22)	(Royal Dutch Football Association) Willem II
4	DF	Joël Victoria	24 August 1990 (aged 24)	(Curaçao Football Federation) SUBT
5	DF	Michael Fecunda	4 August 1995 (aged 19)	(Royal Dutch Football Association) Helmond Sport
6	MF	Papito Merencia	4 March 1994 (aged 20)	(Royal Dutch Football Association) ADO Den Haag
7	MF	Ashar Bernardus	21 December 1985 (aged 28)	(Curaçao Football Federation) Centro Dominguito
8	FW	Robertico Wall		Unattached
9	FW	Prince Rajcomar	25 April 1985 (aged 29)	Unattached
10	FW	Rihairo Meulens	3 June 1988 (aged 26)	(Royal Dutch Football Association) Dordrecht
11	FW	Gevaro Nepomuceno	10 November 1992 (aged 22)	(Romanian Football Federation) Petrolul Ploiești
12	DF	Shelton Martis	29 November 1982 (aged 31)	(Football Association of Thailand) Osotspa Saraburi
13	DF	Hartleyson Dometilia		Unattached
14	FW	Quenten Martinus	7 March 1991 (aged 23)	(Romanian Football Federation) Botoșani
15	FW	Mirco Colina	23 May 1990 (aged 24)	(Curaçao Football Federation) Centro Dominguito
16	MF	Gianluca Maria	28 June 1992 (aged 22)	(Royal Dutch Football Association) MVV Maastricht
17	FW	Romero Regales	7 November 1986 (aged 28)	(Royal Belgian Football Association) Lommel United
18	FW	Charlton Vicento	19 January 1991 (aged 23)	(Royal Dutch Football Association) Willem II
19	MF	Shanon Carmelia	20 February 1989 (aged 25)	(Royal Dutch Football Association) JVC Cuijk
20	MF	Luidjino Hojer	17 April 1983 (aged 31)	(Curaçao Football Federation) Victory Boys
21	FW	Guyon Fernandez	18 April 1986 (aged 28)	Unattached
22	GK	Jarzinho Pieter	11 November 1987 (aged 27)	(Curaçao Football Federation) Centro Dominguito
23	GK	Rugenio Josephia	1 December 1989 (aged 24)	(Royal Dutch Football Association) TSV NOAD

=== French Guiana ===
Head coach: (French Guiana) Jaïr Karam

No.	Pos.	Player	Date of birth (age)	Club
1	GK	Rudy Merille	23 March 1983 (aged 31)	(Ligue de football de la Guyane) Cosma Foot
2	DF	Johann Appolinaire		(Ligue de football de la Guyane) ASC Le Geldar
3	DF	Marvin Torvic	5 January 1988 (aged 26)	(German Football Association) TSV 1860 Rosenheim
4	MF	Rudy Evens	13 February 1988 (aged 26)	(Ligue de football de la Guyane) ASC Le Geldar
5	MF	Serge Lespérance	9 March 1982 (aged 32)	(Ligue de football de la Guyane) US Matoury
6	DF	Albert Ajaisso	14 November 1986 (aged 27)	(French Football Federation) Montagnarde
7	MF	Sylvio Breleur	13 October 1978 (aged 36)	Unattached
8	MF	Brian Saint-Clair	28 November 1985 (aged 28)	(Ligue de football de la Guyane) CSC Cayenne
9	FW	Gabriel Pigrée	18 March 1985 (aged 29)	(French Football Federation) Lège Cap-Ferret
10	FW	Mickaël Solvi		(Ligue de football de la Guyane) USL Montjoly
11	FW	Roy Contout	11 February 1985 (aged 29)	(Royal Belgian Football Association) Royal Mouscron-Péruwelz
12	FW	Niki Adipi	15 May 1984 (aged 30)	(French Football Federation) USE Avoine
13	MF	Marc-Arnaud Mona	28 August 1984 (aged 30)	(Ligue de football de la Guyane) USL Montjoly
14	DF	Grégory Lescot	10 May 1989 (aged 25)	(French Football Federation) Bressuire
15	DF	Alain Moges	22 July 1992 (aged 22)	(French Football Federation) Calais
16	DF	Marvin Desmangles	7 November 1987 (aged 27)	(Ligue de football de la Guyane) CSC Cayenne
17	GK	Simon Lugier	2 August 1989 (aged 25)	(French Football Federation) Avranches
18	GK	Donovan Léon	3 November 1992 (aged 22)	(French Football Federation) Auxerre
19	MF	Kévin Rimane	23 February 1991 (aged 23)	(French Football Federation) Boulogne
20	MF	Marc Edwige	26 September 1986 (aged 28)	(Ligue de football de la Guyane) CSC Cayenne
21	FW	Gilles Fabien	27 September 1978 (aged 36)	(French Football Federation) Angoulême CFC
22	FW	Gary Pigrée	22 May 1988 (aged 26)	(Ligue de football de la Guyane) AJ Saint-Georges
23	DF	Jean-David Legrand	23 February 1991 (aged 23)	(French Football Federation) Trélissac

=== Trinidad and Tobago ===
Head coach: (Trinidad and Tobago) Stephen Hart

No.	Pos.	Player	Date of birth (age)	Club
1	GK	Marvin Phillip	1 August 1984 (aged 30)	(Trinidad and Tobago Football Association) Point Fortin Civic
2	DF	Justin Hoyte	29 November 1984 (aged 29)	(The Football Association) Millwall
3	DF	Joevin Jones	3 August 1991 (aged 23)	(Football Association of Finland) HJK
5	MF	Kevan George	30 January 1990 (aged 24)	(United States Soccer Federation) Columbus Crew
6	DF	Daneil Cyrus	15 December 1990 (aged 23)	(Vietnam Football Federation) Hà Nội T&T
7	MF	Hughtun Hector	16 October 1984 (aged 30)	(Vietnam Football Federation) Hà Nội T&T
8	MF	Khaleem Hyland	5 June 1989 (aged 25)	(Royal Belgian Football Association) Racing Genk
9	FW	Kenwyne Jones	5 October 1984 (aged 30)	(Football Association of Wales) Cardiff City
10	FW	Kevin Molino	17 June 1990 (aged 24)	(United States Soccer Federation) Orlando City SC
11	MF	Ataulla Guerra	14 November 1987 (aged 26)	(Trinidad and Tobago Football Association) Central FC
12	DF	Radanfah Abu Bakr	12 February 1987 (aged 27)	(Lithuanian Football Federation) FK Kruoja Pakruojis
13	FW	Cordell Cato	15 July 1992 (aged 22)	(United States Soccer Federation) San Jose Earthquakes
14	MF	Andre Boucaud	10 October 1984 (aged 30)	(The Football Association) Dagenham & Redbridge
15	MF	Jamal Gay	9 February 1989 (aged 25)	(Football Association of Finland) RoPs
16	FW	Shahdon Winchester	8 January 1992 (aged 22)	(Football Association of Finland) FF Jaro
17	MF	Leston Paul	11 March 1990 (aged 24)	(Trinidad and Tobago Football Association) Central FC
18	DF	Yohance Marshall	22 January 1986 (aged 28)	Unattached
19	DF	Carlyle Mitchell	8 August 1987 (aged 27)	(Canadian Soccer Association) Vancouver Whitecaps FC
21	GK	Jan Michael Williams	26 October 1984 (aged 30)	(Trinidad and Tobago Football Association) Central FC
23	FW	Lester Peltier	13 September 1988 (aged 26)	(Slovak Football Association) Slovan Bratislava
24	GK	Adrian Foncette	10 October 1988 (aged 26)	(Trinidad and Tobago Football Association) Police FC
26	DF	Aubrey David	11 October 1990 (aged 24)	(Football Association of Finland) FF Jaro
27	FW	Jonathan Glenn	27 August 1987 (aged 27)	(Football Association of Iceland) ÍBV

== Group B ==
=== Antigua and Barbuda ===
Head coach: (Antigua and Barbuda) Rolston Williams

No.	Pos.	Player	Date of birth (age)	Club
1	GK	Brentton Muhammed	11 September 1990 (aged 24)	Unattached
2	MF	Josh Parker	1 December 1990 (aged 23)	(Football Association of Slovenia) Domžale
3	DF	Alvin Jarvis	4 October 1981 (aged 33)	(The Football Association) Loughborough Dynamo
4	DF	Karanja Mack	24 August 1987 (aged 27)	(Antigua and Barbuda Football Association) SAP FC
5	DF	Connor Peters	26 January 1996 (aged 18)	(Football Association of Wales) Swansea City
6	DF	Zaine Francis-Angol	20 June 1993 (aged 21)	(Scottish Football Association) Motherwell
7	MF	Tevaughn Harriette	26 June 1995 (aged 19)	(Antigua and Barbuda Football Association) Parham FC
8	MF	Keiran Murtagh	29 October 1988 (aged 26)	(The Football Association) Woking
9	MF	Myles Weston	12 March 1988 (aged 26)	(The Football Association) Southend United
10	MF	Calaum Jahraldo-Martin	27 April 1993 (aged 21)	(The Football Association) Hull City
11	DF	Quinton Griffith	27 February 1992 (aged 22)	(United States Soccer Federation) Charleston Battery
12	FW	Nathaniel Jarvis	21 October 1991 (aged 23)	(The Football Association) Cirencester Town
13	MF	Tamorley Thomas	28 July 1983 (aged 31)	(Antigua and Barbuda Football Association) Hoppers FC
14	FW	Randolph Burton	14 January 1987 (aged 27)	(Antigua and Barbuda Football Association) Parham FC
15	DF	Aaron Tumwa	27 September 1993 (aged 21)	(The Football Association) Farnborough
16	FW	Peter Byers	20 October 1984 (aged 30)	(Antigua and Barbuda Football Association) SAP FC
18	GK	Molvin James	4 May 1989 (aged 25)	(Antigua and Barbuda Football Association) Parham FC
19	MF	Jorrin John	6 November 1990 (aged 24)	(The Football Association) Nuneaton Town
20	DF	Akeem Thomas	5 January 1990 (aged 24)	(Antigua and Barbuda Football Association) Parham FC
17	DF	Christopher Cordara-Soanes	3 November 1989 (aged 25)	(The Football Association) Haringey Borough
23	FW	Dexter Blackstock	20 May 1986 (aged 28)	(The Football Association) Nottingham Forest
22	FW	Jordan Smith	23 June 1988 (aged 26)	(The Football Association) Stamford
21	GK	Prince Walter	30 June 1995 (aged 19)	(Antigua and Barbuda Football Association) Bassa FC

=== Haiti ===
Head coach: (France) Marc Collat

No.	Pos.	Player	Date of birth (age)	Club
1	GK	Johny Placide	21 January 1989 (aged 25)	(French Football Federation) Reims
2	MF	Jean Sony Alcénat	23 January 1986 (aged 28)	(Romanian Football Federation) Petrolul Ploiești
3	DF	Mechack Jérôme	21 April 1990 (aged 24)	Unattached
4	DF	Kim Jaggy	14 November 1982 (aged 31)	(Swiss Football Association) FC Aarau
5	DF	Jean-Jacques Pierre	23 January 1981 (aged 33)	(French Football Federation) Caen
6	DF	Frantz Bertin	30 May 1983 (aged 31)	(Hellenic Football Federation) Apollon Kalamarias
7	MF	Wilde-Donald Guerrier	31 March 1989 (aged 25)	(Polish Football Association) Wisła Kraków
8	DF	Réginal Goreux	31 December 1987 (aged 26)	(Russian Football Union) FC Rostov
9	FW	Kervens Belfort	16 May 1992 (aged 22)	(French Football Federation) Fréjus Saint-Raphaël
10	MF	Jeff Louis	8 August 1992 (aged 22)	(Royal Belgian Football Association) Standard Liège
11	MF	Pascal Millien	3 May 1986 (aged 28)	(Italian Football Federation) Fidelis Andria
12	GK	Dominique Jean-Zéphirin	3 June 1982 (aged 32)	Unattached
13	FW	Leonel Saint-Preux	12 May 1985 (aged 29)	(Tanzania Football Federation) Azam FC
14	FW	Duckens Nazon	7 April 1994 (aged 20)	(French Football Federation) Olympique Saint-Quentin
15	MF	Sébastien Thurière	6 January 1990 (aged 24)	(United States Soccer Federation) Dayton Dutch Lions
16	DF	Judelin Aveska	21 October 1987 (aged 27)	(Argentine Football Association) Gimnasia de Jujuy
17	MF	Emmanuel Sarki	27 December 1987 (aged 26)	(Polish Football Association) Wisła Kraków
18	MF	Soni Mustivar	10 February 1990 (aged 24)	(Romanian Football Federation) Petrolul Ploiești
19	DF	Bitielo Jean Jacques	28 December 1990 (aged 23)	Unattached
20	MF	Sony Norde	27 July 1989 (aged 25)	(All India Football Federation) Mohun Bagan
21	GK	Amos Point-du-Jour	13 May 1992 (aged 22)	(Haitian Football Federation) América des Cayes

=== Jamaica ===
Head coach: (Germany) Winfried Schäfer

No.	Pos.	Player	Date of birth (age)	Club
1	GK	Andre Blake	21 November 1990 (aged 23)	(United States Soccer Federation) Philadelphia Union
2	DF	Nyron Nosworthy	11 October 1980 (aged 34)	Unattached
3	FW	Craig Foster	7 September 1991 (aged 23)	(Jamaica Football Federation) Reno
4	DF	Upston Edwards	12 October 1989 (aged 25)	(Jamaica Football Federation) Portmore United
5	DF	Alvas Powell	18 July 1994 (aged 20)	(United States Soccer Federation) Portland Timbers
6	DF	Jermaine Taylor	14 January 1985 (aged 29)	(United States Soccer Federation) Houston Dynamo
7	DF	Hughan Gray	25 March 1987 (aged 27)	(Jamaica Football Federation) Waterhouse
8	DF	Nicholay Finlayson	19 December 1985 (aged 28)	(Jamaica Football Federation) Waterhouse
9	FW	Michael Seaton	1 May 1996 (aged 18)	(United States Soccer Federation) D.C. United
10	MF	Jobi McAnuff	9 November 1981 (aged 33)	(The Football Association) Leyton Orient
11	FW	Dane Richards	14 December 1983 (aged 30)	(Norwegian Football Federation) Bodø/Glimt
12	DF	Demar Phillips	23 September 1983 (aged 31)	(Norwegian Football Federation) Aalesund
13	GK	Ryan Thompson	7 January 1985 (aged 29)	(United States Soccer Federation) Tampa Bay Rowdies
14	FW	Jamar Loza	10 May 1994 (aged 20)	(The Football Association) Norwich City
15	MF	Je-Vaughn Watson	22 October 1983 (aged 31)	(United States Soccer Federation) FC Dallas
16	MF	Joel Grant	26 August 1987 (aged 27)	(The Football Association) Yeovil Town
17	MF	Rodolph Austin	1 June 1985 (aged 29)	(The Football Association) Leeds United
18	MF	Simon Dawkins	1 December 1987 (aged 26)	(The Football Association) Derby County
19	MF	Romario Campbell	15 October 1989 (aged 25)	(Jamaica Football Federation) Waterhouse
20	DF	Kemar Lawrence	17 September 1992 (aged 22)	(Jamaica Football Federation) Harbour View
21	FW	Darren Mattocks	2 September 1990 (aged 24)	(Canadian Soccer Association) Vancouver Whitecaps FC
22	FW	Deshorn Brown	22 December 1990 (aged 23)	(United States Soccer Federation) Colorado Rapids
23	GK	Duwayne Kerr	16 January 1987 (aged 27)	(Norwegian Football Federation) Sarpsborg 08

Notes

- Wes Morgan was withdrawn from the squad prior to the competition starting and was replaced with Upston Edwards.

=== Martinique ===
Head coach: (Martinique) Marianne Louis

No.	Pos.	Player	Date of birth (age)	Club
1	GK	Steeve Elana	11 July 1980 (aged 34)	(French Football Federation) Lille
2	DF	Rémi Maréval	24 February 1983 (aged 31)	Unattached
3	DF	Marvin Esor	21 July 1985 (aged 29)	(French Football Federation) Châteauroux
4	MF	Daniel Hérelle	17 October 1988 (aged 26)	(Ligue de football de la Martinique) Club Colonial
5	DF	Jean-Sylvain Babin	14 October 1986 (aged 28)	(Royal Spanish Football Federation) Granada
6	MF	Mickael Malsa	2 October 1995 (aged 19)	(French Football Federation) Sochaux
7	MF	Mathias Coureur	22 March 1988 (aged 26)	(Bulgarian Football Union) Cherno More
8	MF	Gaël Germany	10 May 1983 (aged 31)	(Ligue de football de la Martinique) Samaritaine
9	FW	Geoffrey Malfleury	20 January 1988 (aged 26)	(French Football Federation) Le Havre
10	FW	José-Thierry Goron	1 April 1977 (aged 37)	(Ligue de football de la Martinique) Rivière-Pilote
11	MF	Lionel Ravi	12 November 1985 (aged 28)	(Ligue de football de la Martinique) Essor-Préchotain
12	FW	Bédi Buval	16 June 1986 (aged 28)	(Portuguese Football Federation) Olhanense
13	FW	Harry Novillo	11 February 1992 (aged 22)	(French Football Federation) Clermont Foot
14	DF	Antoine Jean-Baptiste	20 January 1991 (aged 23)	(French Football Federation) Vendée Luçon
15	DF	Christopher Glombard	5 June 1989 (aged 25)	(French Football Federation) Reims
16	GK	Kévin Olimpa	10 March 1988 (aged 26)	(Hellenic Football Federation) Platanias
17	FW	Kévin Parsemain	13 February 1988 (aged 26)	(United States Soccer Federation) Seattle Sounders FC
18	FW	Yoann Arquin	16 April 1988 (aged 26)	(Scottish Football Association) Ross County
19	FW	Anthony Angély	21 March 1990 (aged 24)	(Ligue de football de la Martinique) Club Colonial
20	MF	Dominique Pandor	13 May 1993 (aged 21)	(French Football Federation) AS Monaco
21	DF	Sébastien Crétinoir	12 February 1986 (aged 28)	(Ligue de football de la Martinique) Golden Lion
22	MF	Julien Faubert	1 August 1983 (aged 31)	(French Football Federation) Bordeaux
23	GK	Emmanuel Vermignon	20 January 1989 (aged 25)	(Ligue de football de la Martinique) Golden Lion
