= 2014 Caribbean Cup =

- The official logo of the 2014 Caribbean Cup

Tournament details
- Host country: Jamaica
- Dates: 11–18 November
- Teams: 8 (from 1 sub-confederation)
- Venue(s): 1 (in 1 host city)

Final positions
- Champions: Jamaica (6th title)
- Runners-up: Trinidad and Tobago
- Third place: Haiti
- Fourth place: Cuba

Tournament statistics
- Matches played: 14
- Goals scored: 42 (3 per match)
- Top scorer(s): (Haiti) Kervens Belfort (Jamaica) Darren Mattocks (Trinidad and Tobago) Kevin Molino (3 goals each)
- Best player(s): (Jamaica) Rodolph Austin
- Best goalkeeper: (Jamaica) Andre Blake
- Fair play award: Haiti

The 2014 Caribbean Cup was the 18th edition of the Caribbean Cup, an international football competition for national teams of member nations affiliated with the Caribbean Football Union (CFU) of the CONCACAF region.

The final competition stage (8 teams) was scheduled for 11–18 November. On 18 March 2014, it was announced that Jamaica would host the final stage.

For the first time, the competition and its qualifying stages were scheduled to take place during officially sanctioned FIFA international match periods. The change was made to assist the national Football Associations selecting high profile Caribbean players whose clubs would be otherwise reluctant to lose the players service while on international duty. Previous editions of the competition have taken place on non-FIFA calendar dates. Horace Burrell, the Jamaican Football Federation President stated that the change would "ensure the tournament has star power".

The top four teams would qualify for the 2015 CONCACAF Gold Cup automatically while the fifth place team would advance to a play-off against the fifth place team from the 2014 Copa Centroamericana tournament. This is the first time that the two overall fifth-placed teams compete to qualify for the CONCACAF Gold Cup, previously five teams from Central America and four from the Caribbean have qualified for the Confederation's competition.

The winner of the tournament would qualify for the Copa América Centenario, a 16-team tournament of CONMEBOL and CONCACAF national teams to be held in the United States in 2016.

== Qualification ==
A preliminary qualification round was scheduled for May 2014. The first round of qualification (24 teams) was scheduled for 1–9 September and the second round of qualification (16 teams) was scheduled for 6–14 October.

In April 2014, the Caribbean Football Union announced the group stage draw. A total of 26 teams entered the competition. Cuba (defending champion) and Jamaica (host) received byes to the final round. Bahamas, Bermuda, Cayman Islands, Saint Martin, and Sint Maarten did not enter.

=== Qualified teams ===
The following eight teams qualified for the final stage of the tournament.

Team	Qualification	Caribbean Cup final stage appearances	Previous best performance	FIFA Ranking at start of event
Jamaica	Hosts	15th	Champion (**1991**, **1998**, 2005, **2008**, 2010)	113
Cuba	Title holders	11th	Champion (2012)	112
Trinidad and Tobago	Group 7 winners	18th	Champion (1989, **1992**, **1994**, 1995, **1996**, 1997, **1999**, **2001**)	49
Antigua and Barbuda	Group 7 runners-up	8th	Fourth Place (1998)	70
Haiti	Group 8 winners	9th	Champion (2007)	93
French Guiana	Group 8 runners-up	3rd	Group Stage (1995, 2012)	N/A^{1}
Martinique	Group 9 winners	13th	Champion (1993)	N/A^{1}
Curaçao	Group 9 runners-up	3rd^{2}	Fourth Place (1989)	147

Bold indicates that the corresponding team was hosting or co-hosting the event.
1. French Guiana and Martinique are not FIFA members, and so do not have a FIFA Ranking.
2. This is Curaçao's first appearance since the dissolution of the Netherlands Antilles, as its direct successor (with regards to membership in football associations), inheriting the former nation's FIFA membership and competitive record.

== Venue ==
In March 2013, it was announced that the final stage of the tournament would be held in Montego Bay.

Montego Bay
Montego Bay Sports Complex
Montego Bay (Jamaica)
18.45793°N 77.921388°W

== Group stage ==
All times are local (UTC−05:00).

Legend
Group winners advance to the final and qualify for the 2015 CONCACAF Gold Cup
Group runners-up advance to the third place match and qualify for the 2015 CONCACAF Gold Cup
Best group third-placed team advance to 2015 CONCACAF Gold Cup CFU–UNCAF play-off

On 24 October, the Caribbean Football Union announced that fixtures had been arranged, Group A games would be played a day earlier than previously reported, Group B games would be played a day later. Following the request of several participating teams, the CFU decided to delay the tournament by one day, changing the dates from 10–17 November to 11–18 November.

=== Group A ===
Pos	Team	Pld	W	D	L	GF	GA	GD	Pts	Qualification
1	Trinidad and Tobago	3	2	1	0	7	4	+3	7	Final and Gold Cup
2	Cuba	3	1	2	0	4	3	+1	5	Third place match and Gold Cup
3	French Guiana	3	1	1	1	7	6	+1	4	Gold Cup play-off
4	Curaçao	3	0	0	3	5	10	−5	0	

Source: CFU
Rules for classification: 1) points in all matches; 2) points in head-to-head matches; 3) goal difference in head-to-head matches; 4) number of goals scored in head-to-head matches; 5) repeat 3 & 4 for all group matches; 6) lots drawn by CONCACAF.
11 November 2014
17:30

Curaçao	2–3	Trinidad and Tobago
Meulens 18'; Maria 48'	Report	K. Jones 26' (pen.), 38'; Molino 52'

Montego Bay Sports Complex, Montego Bay
Attendance: 1,500
Referee: Trevor Taylor (Barbados)
11 November 2014
20:00

Cuba	1–1	French Guiana
A. Martínez 57'	Report	Solvi 90+4'

Montego Bay Sports Complex, Montego Bay
Attendance: 1,500
Referee: Joel Aguilar (El Salvador)

13 November 2014
17:30

Trinidad and Tobago	4–2	French Guiana
Molino 17', 58'; Peltier 62' (pen.); Guerra 90+2'	Report	Saint-Clair 64'; Legrand 84'

Montego Bay Sports Complex, Montego Bay
Attendance: 1,500
Referee: Sandy Vásquez (Dominican Republic)
13 November 2014
20:00

Curaçao	2–3	Cuba
Rajcomar 45'; Nepomuceno 69'	Report	Corrales 15'; López 51'; Leiva 90+5'

Montego Bay Sports Complex, Montego Bay
Attendance: 1,500
Referee: Wilson Da Costa (Bahamas)

15 November 2014
17:30

French Guiana	4–1	Curaçao
Saint-Clair 18'; Fabien 26', 64'; Adipi 34'	Report	Meulens 84'

Montego Bay Sports Complex, Montego Bay
Attendance: 1,500
Referee: Leo Clarke (Saint Lucia)
15 November 2014
20:00

Cuba	0–0	Trinidad and Tobago
	Report

Montego Bay Sports Complex, Montego Bay
Attendance: 1,500
Referee: Trevor Taylor (Barbados)

=== Group B ===
Pos	Team	Pld	W	D	L	GF	GA	GD	Pts	Qualification
1	Jamaica	3	2	1	0	6	1	+5	7	Final and Gold Cup
2	Haiti	3	1	1	1	5	4	+1	4	Third place match and Gold Cup
3	Martinique	3	1	1	1	3	4	−1	4	
4	Antigua and Barbuda	3	0	1	2	2	7	−5	1	

Source: CFU
Rules for classification: 1) points in all matches; 2) points in head-to-head matches; 3) goal difference in head-to-head matches; 4) number of goals scored in head-to-head matches; 5) repeat 3 & 4 for all group matches; 6) lots drawn by CONCACAF.
12 November 2014
17:30

Haiti	2–2	Antigua and Barbuda
Alcénat 23'; Belfort 36'	Report	Weston 58'; Byers 60'

Montego Bay Sports Complex, Montego Bay
Attendance: 1,500
Referee: Leo Clarke (Saint Lucia)
12 November 2014
20:00

Jamaica	1–1	Martinique
Mattocks 13'	Report	Arquin 29'

Montego Bay Sports Complex, Montego Bay
Attendance: 1,500
Referee: Roberto García (Mexico)

14 November 2014
17:30

Martinique	0–3	Haiti
	Report	Guerrier 52'; Belfort 63', 90'

Montego Bay Sports Complex, Montego Bay
Attendance: 1,500
Referee: Sherwin Moore (Guyana)
14 November 2014
20:00

Jamaica	3–0	Antigua and Barbuda
Lawrence 30'; Mattocks 43'; Austin 88'	Report

Montego Bay Sports Complex, Montego Bay
Attendance: 1,500
Referee: Ricardo Cerdas (Costa Rica)

16 November 2014
17:30

Antigua and Barbuda	0–2	Martinique
	Report	Buval 57'; Goron 90'

Montego Bay Sports Complex, Montego Bay
Attendance: 1,500
Referee: Roberto García (Mexico)
16 November 2014
20:00

Jamaica	2–0	Haiti
Dawkins 13'; Mattocks 20'	Report

Montego Bay Sports Complex, Montego Bay
Attendance: 1,500
Referee: Joel Aguilar (El Salvador)

=== Ranking of third place teams ===
As there was no fifth place match, French Guiana, the best group third-placed team according to group stage results, advanced to represent the Caribbean Football Union at the 2015 CONCACAF Gold Cup qualification play-off, where they will play against Honduras, the 2014 Copa Centroamericana fifth-placed team. The winner of the play-off will qualify for the 2015 CONCACAF Gold Cup.

Pos	Team	Pld	W	D	L	GF	GA	GD	Pts	Qualification
1	French Guiana	3	1	1	1	7	6	+1	4	Gold Cup play-off
2	Martinique	3	1	1	1	3	4	−1	4	

Source: CFU
Rules for classification: 1) points in all matches; 2) points in head-to-head matches; 3) goal difference in head-to-head matches; 4) number of goals scored in head-to-head matches; 5) repeat 3 & 4 for all group matches; 6) lots drawn by CONCACAF.

== Final stage ==
=== Third place match ===
18 November 2014
17:00

Cuba	1–2	Haiti
A. Martínez 89'	Report	Jérôme 56'; Guerrier 86'

Montego Bay Sports Complex, Montego Bay
Attendance: 1,500
Referee: Roberto García (Mexico)

=== Final ===
18 November 2014
20:00

Trinidad and Tobago	0–0 (a.e.t.)	Jamaica
	Report
Penalties
K. Jones (penalty missed); Guerra (penalty scored); Molino (penalty scored); J. Jones (penalty scored); Hyland (penalty missed)	3–4	(penalty scored) Taylor; (penalty scored) McAnuff; (penalty scored) Phillips; (penalty missed) Seaton; (penalty scored) Austin

Montego Bay Sports Complex, Montego Bay
Attendance: 1,500
Referee: Ricardo Cerdas (Costa Rica)

Jamaica qualified for the Copa América Centenario.

2014 Caribbean Cup
winner

Jamaica
Sixth title

== Goalscorers ==
3 goals

- (Haiti) Kervens Belfort
- (Jamaica) Darren Mattocks
- (Trinidad and Tobago) Kevin Molino

2 goals

- (Cuba) Ariel Martínez
- (Curaçao) Rihairo Meulens
- (French Guiana) Gilles Fabien
- (French Guiana) Brian Saint-Clair
- (Trinidad and Tobago) Kenwyne Jones
- (Haiti) Wilde-Donald Guerrier

1 goal

- (Antigua and Barbuda) Peter Byers
- (Antigua and Barbuda) Myles Weston
- (Cuba) Jorge Luis Corrales
- (Cuba) Orisbel Leiva
- (Cuba) Yasmany López
- (Curaçao) Gianluca Maria
- (Curaçao) Gevaro Nepomuceno
- (Curaçao) Prince Rajcomar
- (French Guiana) Neki Adipi
- (French Guiana) Jean-David Legrand
- (French Guiana) Mickaël Solvi
- (Haiti) Jean Sony Alcénat
- (Haiti) Mechack Jérôme
- (Jamaica) Rodolph Austin
- (Jamaica) Simon Dawkins
- (Jamaica) Kemar Lawrence
- (Martinique) Yoann Arquin
- (Martinique) Bédi Buval
- (Martinique) José-Thierry Goron
- (Trinidad and Tobago) Ataullah Guerra
- (Trinidad and Tobago) Lester Peltier

== Awards ==
The following awards were given at the conclusion of the tournament:

Award	Winner
Most Valuable Player	(Jamaica) Rodolph Austin
Golden Boot	(Haiti) Kervens Belfort (Jamaica) Darren Mattocks (Trinidad and Tobago) Kevin Molino (shared)
Golden Glove	(Jamaica) Andre Blake
Fair Play	Haiti

Team of the tournament
Position	Player
Goalkeeper	(Jamaica) Andre Blake
Left Defender	(Haiti) Kim Jaggy
Central Defender	(Jamaica) Jermaine Taylor
Central Defender	(Trinidad and Tobago) Daneil Cyrus
Right Defender	(Jamaica) Alvas Powell
Left Midfielder	(Jamaica) Jobi McAnuff
Central Midfielder	(Jamaica) Rodolph Austin
Central Midfielder	(Cuba) Yénier Márquez
Right Midfielder	(Jamaica) Darren Mattocks
Forward	(Trinidad and Tobago) Kevin Molino
Forward	(Haiti) Kervens Belfort
