= Neki Adipi =

French Guianan international footballer (born 1984)

Personal information
- Date of birth: 15 May 1984 (age 42)
- Place of birth: Cayenne, French Guiana
- Height: 1.73 m (5 ft 8 in)
- Position: Forward

Team information
- Current team: AS Étoile Matoury

Senior career*
Years	Team	Apps	(Gls)
2005	US Matoury		
2005–2007	Tours	8	(0)
2007–2012	Saumur		
2012–2013	Sablé	11	(3)
2013	Les Herbiers	15	(6)
2013–2015	Avoine		
2015–2016	FCO Tourangeau		
2017–	AS Étoile Matoury		

International career
2012–2015	French Guiana	11	(1)
- * Club domestic league appearances and goals

Neki Adipi (born 15 May 1984) is a French Guianan professional footballer who plays as a forward for AS Étoile Matoury. He made 11 appearances and scored 1 goal for the French Guiana national team from 2012 to 2015.

== International career ==
Adipi was an international for French Guiana, scoring one goal in 2014 against Curaçao.

=== International goals ===
Scores and results list French Guiana's goal tally first.

No	Date	Venue	Opponent	Score	Result	Competition
1.	15 November 2014	Montego Bay Sports Complex, Montego Bay, Jamaica	Curaçao	3–0	4–1	2014 Caribbean Cup qualification
