= José-Thierry Goron =

Footballer (born 1977)

Personal information
- Date of birth: 1 April 1977 (age 49)
- Place of birth: Schœlcher, Martinique
- Position: Forward

Team information
- Current team: Club Colonial

Senior career*
Years	Team	Apps	(Gls)
2000–2004	Case-Pilote	44	(21)
2004–2008	Club Franciscain	2	(2)
2008–2011	Case-Pilote	35	(16)
2011–2014	Rivière-Pilote	12	(3)
2014–2018	Golden Lion		
2018–2020	Aiglon du Lamentin		
2020–	Club Colonial		

International career^{‡}
2002–	Martinique	49	(16)
- * Club domestic league appearances and goals as of 14:59, 21 December 2018 (UTC) ‡ National team caps and goals as of 8 March 2017

José-Thierry Goron (born 1 April 1977) is a footballer who plays as a forward for Martinique Championnat National Club Colonial and the Martinique national team.

== Club career ==
Goron has previously played for Case-Pilote, Club Franciscain, Rivière-Pilote and Golden Lion.

== International career ==
He started his international career with Martinique national team in 2002.

== Career statistics ==
Scores and results list Martinique's goal tally first, score column indicates score after each Goron goal.

List of international goals scored by José-Thierry Goron
No.	Date	Venue	Opponent	Score	Result	Competition
1	27 November 2002	Truman Bodden Sports Complex, George Town, Cayman Islands	Dominican Republic	4–0	4–0	2003 CONCACAF Gold Cup qualification
2	1 December 2002	Truman Bodden Sports Complex, George Town, Cayman Islands	Cayman Islands	1–0	3–0	2003 CONCACAF Gold Cup qualification
3	28 March 2003	Independence Park, Kingston, Jamaica	Jamaica	1–0	2–2	2003 CONCACAF Gold Cup qualification
4	30 March 2003	Independence Park, Kingston, Jamaica	Saint Lucia	1–1	5–4	2003 CONCACAF Gold Cup qualification
5	23 April 2003	Stade d'Honneur de Dillon, Fort-de-France, Martinique	Trinidad and Tobago	1–2	3–2	2003 CONCACAF Gold Cup qualification
6	27 April 2003	Stade d'Honneur de Dillon, Fort-de-France, Martinique	Honduras	1–1	2–4	2003 CONCACAF Gold Cup qualification
7	10 November 2004	Stade Pierre-Aliker, Fort-de-France, Martinique	Dominica	2–1	5–1	2005 Caribbean Cup qualification
8	28 December 2006	Stade de Saint-Joseph, Saint-Joseph, Martinique	Saint Vincent and the Grenadines	1–1	2–2	Friendly
9	28 December 2006	Stade de Saint-Joseph, Saint-Joseph, Martinique	Saint Vincent and the Grenadines	2–2	2–2	Friendly
10	6 January 2007	Stade Georges-Gratiant, Le Lamentin, Martinique	Guadeloupe	1–0	3–0	Friendly
11	6 January 2007	Stade Georges-Gratiant, Le Lamentin, Martinique	Guadeloupe	2–0	3–0	Friendly
12	26 November 2010	Stade Pierre-Aliker, Fort-de-France, Martinique	Grenada	1–1	1–1	2010 Caribbean Cup
13	3 September 2014	Stade Pierre-Aliker, Fort-de-France, Martinique	Bonaire	5–0	6–0	2014 Caribbean Cup qualification
14	3 September 2014	Stade Pierre-Aliker, Fort-de-France, Martinique	Bonaire	6–0	6–0	2014 Caribbean Cup qualification
15	5 September 2014	Stade Alfred Marie-Jeanne, Rivière-Pilote, Martinique	Barbados	3–2	3–2	2014 Caribbean Cup qualification
16	16 November 2014	Montego Bay Sports Complex, Montego Bay, Jamaica	Antigua and Barbuda	2–0	2–0	2014 Caribbean Cup qualification
