= Gilles Fabien =

French Guianan footballer (born 1978)

Personal information
- Full name: Gilles Fabien
- Date of birth: September 27, 1978 (age 48)
- Place of birth: Cayenne, French Guiana
- Height: 1.74 m (5 ft 8 1/2 in)
- Position: Striker

Senior career*
Years	Team	Apps	(Gls)
1998–2000	Le Mans	1	(0)
2000–2001	Tours	61	(19)
2001–2002	Brive	33	(13)
2002–2003	AS Angoulême	28	(9)
2003–2004	Louhans-Cuiseaux	31	(8)
2004–2007	Romorantin	102	(38)
2007–2008	Laval	36	(12)
2008–2009	Beauvais	25	(5)
2009–2011	Bergerac Foot		
2011–2012	AS Soyaux		
2012–2018	Angoulême CFC		

International career^{‡}
2014	French Guiana	3	(3)
- * Club domestic league appearances and goals ‡ National team caps and goals as of 3 March 2017

Gilles Fabien (born September 27, 1978) is a French Guianan former footballer.

== International career ==
=== International goals ===
Scores and results list French Guiana's goal tally first.

No	Date	Venue	Opponent	Score	Result	Competition
1.	12 October 2014	Stade Sylvio Cator, Port-au-Prince, Haiti	Barbados	1–0	2–0	2014 Caribbean Cup qualification
2.	15 November 2014	Montego Bay Sports Complex, Montego Bay, Jamaica	Curaçao	2–0	4–1	2014 Caribbean Cup
3.	15 November 2014	Montego Bay Sports Complex, Montego Bay, Jamaica	Curaçao	4–0	4–1	2014 Caribbean Cup
