= Connor Peters =

Footballer (born 1996)

Personal information
- Full name: Connor O'Neill Peters
- Date of birth: 12 January 1996 (age 30)
- Place of birth: Hackney, London, England
- Position: Defender

Team information
- Current team: Wingate & Finchley

Youth career
- Swansea City

Senior career*
Years	Team	Apps	(Gls)
2012–2014	Swansea City	2	(0)
2014–2015	Dagenham & Redbridge	20	(0)
2015	Bishop's Stortford	2	(0)
2015	Heybridge Swifts	11	(0)
2015–2016	Stansted		
2019–2021	Sportis Lochowo		
2021–	Wingate & Finchley		

International career^{‡}
2019–	Antigua and Barbuda	14	(0)
- * Club domestic league appearances and goals ‡ National team caps and goals as of 08:35, 7 October 2016 (UTC)

Connor Peters (born 12 January 1996) is a professional footballer who plays for Wingate & Finchley. Born in England, he represents the Antigua and Barbuda national team.

== Club career ==
In November 2015 he joined Stansted before moving onto Haringey Borough in January 2016.

== International career ==
Peters was one of eight overseas based players who committed to represent the country in the summer of 2014. He made his international debut for Antigua and Barbuda on 3 September 2014 in a 2014 Caribbean Cup qualification game versus Anguilla. He chose to represent the country to honour his father who died nine years earlier.
