= Rony Beard =

Dominican-Spanish footballer

Personal information
- Full name: Rony Beard Murray
- Date of birth: 24 November 1988 (age 37)
- Place of birth: Puerto Plata, Dominican Republic
- Height: 1.71 m (5 ft 7 1/2 in)
- Positions: Attacking midfielder; winger

Team information
- Current team: Atlético San Francisco
- Number: 14

Youth career
- 1998–2003: Alcalá
- 2003–2006: Avance
- 2006–2007: Getafe

Senior career*
Years	Team	Apps	(Gls)
2007–2008	Coslada	25	(7)
2008–2009	Sporting Cabanillas	28	(5)
2009–2012	Guadalajara B	93	(12)
2012–2013	Marchamalo	34	(2)
2013	Quintanar del Rey	17	(0)
2014	Hellín	16	(0)
2014–2015	Real Ávila	13	(1)
2015–2016	Cibao	25	
2017–2018	CF Alovera	18	(8)
2018	Atlético San Francisco		

International career^{‡}
2014–2016	Dominican Republic	15	(3)
- * Club domestic league appearances and goals as of 13 December 2014 ‡ National team caps and goals as of 5 October 2016

Rony Beard Murray (born 24 November 1988) is a Dominican footballer who plays as a midfielder for Atlético San Francisco and the Dominican Republic national team. He also holds Spanish citizenship.

== International career ==
Beard made his FIFA-recognized international debut on 30 August 2014, when he entered as a 58th-minute substitute in a lost friendly against El Salvador. He had received his first call in May 2014, playing the last 21 minutes of friendly against Indonesia U23.

=== International goals ===
Scores and results list Dominican Republic's goal tally first.

No	Date	Venue	Opponent	Score	Result	Competition
1.	7 September 2014	Antigua Recreation Ground, St. John's, Antigua and Barbuda	Anguilla	2–0	10–0	2014 Caribbean Cup qualification
2.	7 September 2014	Antigua Recreation Ground, St. John's, Antigua and Barbuda	Anguilla	6–0	10–0	2014 Caribbean Cup qualification
