= Mickaël Solvi =

French Guianan footballer

Personal information
- Full name: Mickaël Solvi
- Position: Forward

Team information
- Current team: USL Montjoly

International career^{‡}
Years	Team	Apps	(Gls)
2014–	French Guiana	14	(3)
- ‡ National team caps and goals as of 18:44, 9 July 2017 (UTC)

Mickaël Solvi is a French Guianan international footballer who plays as a forward.

== International career ==
Solvi has been capped at full international level by French Guiana and scored in the 2014 Caribbean Cup group match against Cuba on 11 November 2014.

=== International goals ===
Scores and results list French Guiana's goal tally first.

#	Date	Venue	Opponent	Score	Result	Competition
1.	30 May 2014	Trinidad Stadium, Oranjestad, Aruba	British Virgin Islands	5–0	6–0	2014 Caribbean Cup qualification
2.	8 October 2014	Stade Sylvio Cator, Port-au-Prince, Haiti	Haiti	1–1	2–2	2014 Caribbean Cup qualification
3.	11 November 2014	Montego Bay Sports Complex, Montego Bay, Jamaica	Cuba	1–1	1–1	2014 Caribbean Cup
