= 2015 CONCACAF Gold Cup qualification (CFU–UNCAF play-off) =

- Event: 2015 CONCACAF Gold Cup qualification
French Guiana	Honduras
(French Guiana)	(Honduras)
3	4
- on aggregate

First leg
French Guiana	Honduras
3	1
- Date: 25 March 2015
- Venue: Stade Municipal Dr. Edmard Lama, Remire-Montjoly
- Referee: César Ramos (Mexico)

Second leg
Honduras	French Guiana
3	0
- Date: 29 March 2015
- Venue: Estadio Olímpico Metropolitano, San Pedro Sula
- Referee: Mark Geiger (United States)

The 2015 CONCACAF Gold Cup qualification (CFU–UNCAF play-off) was a home-and-away two-legged qualification play-off that took place on the 25th and 29th of March 2015 to determine the final team that qualified for the 2015 CONCACAF Gold Cup. In March 2014, CONCACAF Vice-president Horace Burrell announced that the fifth-placed teams from the 2014 Caribbean Cup and 2014 Copa Centroamericana would meet in the play-off.

== Overview ==
The Caribbean Football Union (CFU) representative, French Guiana, met the Central American Football Union (UNCAF) representative, Honduras, in the play-off.

The CONCACAF-published Free Kick magazine confirmed that there would be two legs to the competition.

The games took place on 25 and 29 March 2015 during the only international window on the FIFA International Match Calendar that occurred after the completion of the 2014 Caribbean Cup and before the 2015 CONCACAF Gold Cup is scheduled to begin. The games were originally scheduled to take place in January 2015.

== Qualified teams ==
Zone	Placement	Team
CFU	2014 Caribbean Cup fifth place	French Guiana
UNCAF	2014 Copa Centroamericana fifth place	Honduras

== Summary ==
Team 1	Agg.	Team 2	1st leg	2nd leg
French Guiana	3–4	Honduras	3–1	0–3

== Matches ==
25 March 2015
19:00 UTC−3

French Guiana	3–1	Honduras
Torvic 26'; Privat 27', 62'	Report	Bengtson 18'

Stade Municipal Dr. Edmard Lama, Remire-Montjoly
Referee: César Ramos (Mexico)
29 March 2015
19:00 UTC−6

Honduras	3–0	French Guiana
Najar 30', 32'; Lozano 45'	Report

Estadio Olímpico Metropolitano, San Pedro Sula
Referee: Mark Geiger (United States)

Honduras won 4–3 on aggregate and qualified for the 2015 CONCACAF Gold Cup.

== Goalscorers ==
There were 7 goals scored in 2 matches, for an average of 3.5 goals per match.

2 goals

- (French Guiana) Sloan Privat
- (Honduras) Andy Najar

1 goal

- (French Guiana) Marvin Torvic
- (Honduras) Jerry Bengtson
- (Honduras) Anthony Lozano
