= Bédi Buval =

Footballer (born 1986)

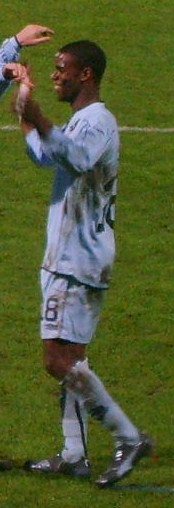
- Buval in 2008

Personal information
- Full name: Bédi Bastien Buval
- Date of birth: 16 June 1986 (age 40)
- Place of birth: Domont, France
- Height: 1.86 m (6 ft 1 in)
- Position: Striker

Youth career
- Nancy
- 2002–2006: Bolton Wanderers

Senior career*
Years	Team	Apps	(Gls)
2006	Bolton Wanderers	0	(0)
2006–2007	Red Star SO	12	(1)
2007–2009	Randers	57	(15)
2009–2010	Panthrakikos	17	(3)
2010	Panionios	9	(0)
2010–2011	Lechia Gdańsk	23	(2)
2011–2012	Feirense	20	(8)
2012	Göztepe	13	(0)
2013	Vejle Kolding	10	(2)
2013	Académica	7	(0)
2014	Paços Ferreira	11	(0)
2014	Olhanense	13	(1)
2015	Flamurtari	18	(2)
2016–2017	Carl Zeiss Jena	44	(10)
2017–2018	Wacker Nordhausen	18	(2)
Total		272	(46)

International career
2014	Martinique	1	(1)
- * Club domestic league appearances and goals

Bédi Bastien Buval (born 16 June 1986) is a former professional footballer who played as a striker. Born in France, he made one appearance for the Martinique national team scoring once.

== Club career ==
Born in Domont, Val-d'Oise, Buval joined Bolton Wanderers at the age of 16 from AS Nancy, but he never broke through to the first team as a senior, being limited to reserve football and also suffering from recurring knee problems. In November 2006, he returned to his country and signed for FC Red Star Saint-Ouen in the Championnat National.

In July 2007, Buval agreed to a two-year contract with Danish Superliga club Randers FC, joining after a trial period as a replacement for Djiby Fall who had left at the end of the previous season. He struggled initially to become a first-team regular and, with Søren Berg and Marc Nygaard (both former Danish internationals) joining the team during the winter break, he received additional competition; eventually, as Berg moved to right midfielder, the Frenchman begun appearing more, and finished the campaign with seven goals in 27 games.

Buval signed with Panthrakikos F.C. in Greece on 30 July 2009. On 13 January of the following year, he moved to fellow Super League side Panionios, scoring only three goals combined during the season and suffering relegation with the former.

In the 2010 summer, Buval changed clubs – and countries – again, joining Lechia Gdańsk from Poland on a one-year deal. He was released on 3 July 2011.

On 16 September 2011, after a successful trial, Buval signed for two years with C.D. Feirense in Portugal. He was awarded the Primeira Liga's SJPF Player of the Month award for the month of December, after scoring against Vitória de Setúbal (1–1 away draw) and U.D. Leiria (two goals, 2–1 home success), and finished the season as team top scorer but they were eventually relegated just one year after promoting.

On 23 July 2012, Buval joined Göztepe S.K. in Turkey on a three-year contract. On 31 January of the following year, however, he changed teams and countries once again, signing for Denmark's Vejle Boldklub Kolding until the end of the campaign.

In the following years, in quick succession, Buval represented Académica de Coimbra, F.C. Paços de Ferreira, S.C. Olhanense and Flamurtari Vlorë, agreeing to a two-and-a-half-year contract with the latter on 28 January 2015 for a reported €11,000 per month. He left on 17 October, claiming he was not being paid by the club.

In February 2016, Buval joined FC Carl Zeiss Jena in the German Regionalliga Nordost.

== International career ==
Buval chose to represent Martinique internationally. He scored in his debut on 16 November 2014, helping to a 2–0 group stage win over Antigua and Barbuda for that year's Caribbean Cup.

== Career statistics ==
As of 16 November 2014

Scores and results list Martinique's goal tally first, score column indicates score after each Buval goal.

List of international goals scored by Bédi Buval
No.	Date	Venue	Opponent	Score	Result	Competition
1	16 November 2014	Sports Complex, Montego Bay, Jamaica	Antigua and Barbuda	1–0	2–0	2014 Caribbean Cup
