= 2014 Caribbean Cup qualification =

Tournament details
- Host countries: Antigua and Barbuda; Aruba; Guadeloupe; Haiti; Martinique; Montserrat; Puerto Rico; Saint Kitts and Nevis; Trinidad and Tobago
- Dates: 30 May – 12 October 2014
- Teams: 26 (from 1 confederation)

Tournament statistics
- Matches played: 51
- Goals scored: 162 (3.18 per match)
- Top scorer(s): (French Guiana) Gabriel Pigrée (8 goals)

The 2014 Caribbean Cup qualification began in May 2014 and ended in October 2014. The qualification competition determined which national teams could play in the 2014 Caribbean Cup which in turn determined which teams participated in the 2015 CONCACAF Gold Cup and the 2016 Copa América Centenario.

In March 2014, it was announced that Jamaica would host the 'final stage' of the competition in Montego Bay.

In April 2014, the Caribbean Football Union announced the group stage draw.

== Participants ==
A total of 26 teams entered the competition.

Seeding	Teams	No. of teams
No participation	Bahamas; Bermuda; Cayman Islands; Saint-Martin; Sint Maarten	5
Preliminary round entrants	Aruba; Bonaire; British Virgin Islands; French Guiana; Montserrat; Turks and Caicos Islands; U.S. Virgin Islands	7
First round entrants	Anguilla; Antigua and Barbuda; Barbados; Curaçao; Dominica; Dominican Republic; Grenada; Guyana; Martinique; Puerto Rico; Saint Lucia; Saint Kitts and Nevis; Saint Vincent and the Grenadines; Suriname	14
Second round entrants	Guadeloupe; Haiti (third-place in 2012); Trinidad and Tobago (runners-up in 2012)	3
Final round entrants	Cuba (holders); Jamaica (hosts)	2

== Preliminary round ==
Group winners advanced to the first round.

=== Group 1 ===
Hosted in Montserrat (UTC−4). On 8 May 2014, it was announced that Montserrat's Blakes Estate Stadium would be undergoing an inspection to host the group, previously it was announced that the host nation for Group 1 would be Bonaire. It is the first time Montserrat has been chosen to host any part of a Caribbean Football Union organised competition.

Team	Pld	W	D	L	GF	GA	GD	Pts
Bonaire	2	1	1	0	2	1	+1	4
Montserrat	2	1	1	0	1	0	+1	4
U.S. Virgin Islands	2	0	0	2	1	3	−2	0

30 May 2014
19:00

Montserrat	1–0	U.S. Virgin Islands
Hodgson 54'	Report

Blakes Estate Stadium, Lookout
Referee: Bryan Willett (Antigua and Barbuda)

1 June 2014
19:00

U.S. Virgin Islands	1–2	Bonaire
Taylor, Jr. 87'	Report	Seinpaal 5'; Beaumont 11'

Blakes Estate Stadium, Lookout
Referee: Vivian Robinson (Saint Lucia)

3 June 2014
19:00

Montserrat	0–0	Bonaire
	Report

Blakes Estate Stadium, Lookout
Referee: Vivian Robinson (Saint Lucia)

=== Group 2 ===
Hosted in Aruba (UTC−4).

Team	Pld	W	D	L	GF	GA	GD	Pts
French Guiana	3	3	0	0	14	0	+14	9
Aruba	3	2	0	1	8	2	+6	6
Turks and Caicos Islands	3	1	0	2	2	7	−5	3
British Virgin Islands	3	0	0	3	0	15	−15	0

30 May 2014
18:00

French Guiana	6–0	British Virgin Islands
Soubervie 17' (pen.); Gab. Pigrée 50'; Atooman 53'; Awong 55'; Solvi 81'; Nalie 90+2'	Report

Trinidad Stadium, Oranjestad
Referee: Sherwin Moore (Guyana)
30 May 2014
20:30

Aruba	1–0	Turks and Caicos Islands
Linkers 28'	Report

Trinidad Stadium, Oranjestad
Referee: Enrico Wijngaarde (Suriname)

1 June 2014
18:30

Turks and Caicos Islands	0–6	French Guiana
	Report	Gab. Pigrée 29', 48', 90'; Awong 59', 62'; Louima 83' (o.g.)

Trinidad Stadium, Oranjestad
Referee: Johannes Dolaini (Suriname)
1 June 2014
20:30

Aruba	7–0	British Virgin Islands
Barradas 2'; Kock 20'; Raven 22', 52', 61'; Cruden 85'; Santos 90+2'	Report

Trinidad Stadium, Oranjestad
Referee: Neal Brizan (Trinidad and Tobago)

3 June 2014
18:30

British Virgin Islands	0–2	Turks and Caicos Islands
	Report	Fenelus 32'; Derilien 52'

Trinidad Stadium, Oranjestad
Referee: Sherwin Moore (Guyana)
3 June 2014
20:30

Aruba	0–2	French Guiana
	Report	Martinon 60'; Gary Pigrée 88'

Trinidad Stadium, Oranjestad
Referee: Enrico Wijngaarde (Suriname)

== First round ==
Group winners, runners-up, and the best third-placed team advanced to the second round.

=== Group 3 ===
Hosted in Martinique (UTC−4).

Team	Pld	W	D	L	GF	GA	GD	Pts
Martinique	3	2	1	0	9	2	+7	7
Barbados	3	1	1	1	7	5	+2	4
Bonaire	3	1	0	2	4	12	−8	3
Suriname	3	0	2	1	3	4	−1	2

3 September 2014
18:00

Barbados	1–1	Suriname
Burgess 69'	Report	Faerber 80'

Stade Pierre-Aliker, Fort-de-France
Referee: Javier Santos (Puerto Rico)
3 September 2014
20:00

Martinique	6–0	Bonaire
Germany 34', 50' (pen.), 75'; Coureur 60'; Goron 80', 90+2'	Report

Stade Pierre-Aliker, Fort-de-France
Referee: Walner Laventure (Haiti)

5 September 2014
18:00

Suriname	2–3	Bonaire
Cronie 80' (pen.), 82'	Report	Pauletta 6'; Seinpaal 12'; Barzey 70' (pen.)

Stade Alfred Marie-Jeanne, Rivière-Pilote
Referee: Alain Georges (Haiti)
5 September 2014
20:00

Martinique	3–2	Barbados
Boyce 57' (o.g.); Germany 68'; Goron 81'	Report	Morris 13'; Joseph 30'

Stade Alfred Marie-Jeanne, Rivière-Pilote
Referee: William Anderson (Puerto Rico)

7 September 2014
16:00

Bonaire	1–4	Barbados
Seinpaal 90+3' (pen.)	Report	Boyce 55'; Harewood 67'; Harte 74' (pen.), 76'

Stade Pierre-Aliker, Fort-de-France
Referee: Javier Santos (Puerto Rico)
7 September 2014
18:00

Martinique	0–0	Suriname
	Report

Stade Pierre-Aliker, Fort-de-France
Referee: William Anderson (Puerto Rico)

=== Group 4 ===
Hosted in Puerto Rico (UTC−4).

Team	Pld	W	D	L	GF	GA	GD	Pts
Curaçao	3	1	2	0	4	3	+1	5
French Guiana	3	1	2	0	3	2	+1	5
Puerto Rico	3	0	2	1	5	6	−1	2
Grenada	3	0	2	1	4	5	−1	2

3 September 2014
16:30

Grenada	1–1	French Guiana
James 58'	Report	Breleur 59'

Juan Ramón Loubriel Stadium, Bayamón
Referee: Moeth Gaymes (Saint Vincent and the Grenadines)
3 September 2014
19:30

Puerto Rico	2–2	Curaçao
Marrero 7', 51'	Report	Rajcomar 58'; Martis 82'

Juan Ramón Loubriel Stadium, Bayamón
Referee: John Pitti (Panama)

5 September 2014
16:30

Curaçao	2–1	Grenada
Rajcomar 57'; Nepomuceno 62'	Report	W. Rennie 4'

Juan Ramón Loubriel Stadium, Bayamón
Referee: Jafeth Perea (Panama)
5 September 2014
19:30

Puerto Rico	1–2	French Guiana
Ramos 39' (pen.)	Report	Gab. Pigrée 60', 90'

Juan Ramón Loubriel Stadium, Bayamón
Referee: Edvin Jurisevic (United States)

7 September 2014
14:30

French Guiana	0–0	Curaçao
	Report

Juan Ramón Loubriel Stadium, Bayamón
Referee: John Pitti (Panama)
7 September 2014
17:30

Puerto Rico	2–2	Grenada
Ramos 29'; Oikkonen 68'	Report	James 56'; Bain 85'

Juan Ramón Loubriel Stadium, Bayamón
Referee: Moeth Gaymes (Saint Vincent and the Grenadines)

=== Group 5 ===
Hosted in Antigua and Barbuda (UTC−4).

Team	Pld	W	D	L	GF	GA	GD	Pts
Antigua and Barbuda	3	3	0	0	10	2	+8	9
Saint Vincent and the Grenadines	3	2	0	1	6	2	+4	6
Dominican Republic	3	1	0	2	11	3	+8	3
Anguilla	3	0	0	3	0	20	−20	0

3 September 2014
17:00

Dominican Republic	0–1	Saint Vincent and the Grenadines
	Report	Anderson 45+1'

Antigua Recreation Ground, St. John's
Referee: Trevor Taylor (Barbados)
3 September 2014
19:00

Antigua and Barbuda	6–0	Anguilla
Jahraldo-Martin 8'; Murtagh 35', 71'; Harriette 44'; Byers 55'; Griffith 69' (pen.)	Report

Antigua Recreation Ground, St. John's
Referee: Kevin Morrison (Jamaica)

5 September 2014
17:00

Saint Vincent and the Grenadines	4–0	Anguilla
Samuel 36' (pen.); Anderson 39', 77'; Solomon 71'	Report

Antigua Recreation Ground, St. John's
Referee: Kimbell Ward (Saint Kitts and Nevis)
5 September 2014
19:00

Antigua and Barbuda	2–1	Dominican Republic
Byers 55'; Jarvis 70'	Report	Mack 21' (o.g.)

Antigua Recreation Ground, St. John's
Referee: Sherwin Johnson (Guyana)

7 September 2014
17:00

Anguilla	0–10	Dominican Republic
	Report	Kentish 20' (o.g.); Beard 32', 62'; K. Rodríguez 41', 53'; Faña 44' (pen.), 87'; Peralta 86', 88'; Zayas 90+1'

Antigua Recreation Ground, St. John's
Referee: Trevor Taylor (Barbados)
7 September 2014
19:00

Antigua and Barbuda	2–1	Saint Vincent and the Grenadines
Thomas 81'; Jarvis 90+2'	Report	McBurnette 45+1'

Antigua Recreation Ground, St. John's
Referee: Kevin Morrison (Jamaica)

=== Group 6 ===
Hosted in Saint Kitts and Nevis (UTC−4).

Team	Pld	W	D	L	GF	GA	GD	Pts
Saint Kitts and Nevis	3	2	1	0	7	0	+7	7
Saint Lucia	3	2	1	0	4	1	+3	7
Guyana	3	0	1	2	0	4	−4	1
Dominica	3	0	1	2	1	7	−6	1

3 September 2014
17:30

Guyana	0–0	Dominica
	Report

Warner Park Sporting Complex, Basseterre
Referee: Christopher Reid (Belize)
3 September 2014
20:30

Saint Kitts and Nevis	0–0	Saint Lucia
	Report

Warner Park Sporting Complex, Basseterre
Referee: Ricardo Cerdas (Costa Rica)

5 September 2014
17:30

Saint Lucia	2–0	Guyana
Emmanuel 14'; Paul 84'	Report

Warner Park Sporting Complex, Basseterre
Referee: Henry Bejarano (Costa Rica)
5 September 2014
20:30

Saint Kitts and Nevis	5–0	Dominica
Lawrence 3' (o.g.); Sawyers 18' (pen.); Harris 29'; Thomas 77'; Leader 85'	Report

Warner Park Sporting Complex, Basseterre
Referee: Ricardo Montero (Costa Rica)

7 September 2014
17:30

Dominica	1–2	Saint Lucia
Wade 68'	Report	Valcin 13', 76'

Warner Park Sporting Complex, Basseterre
Referee: Ricardo Montero (Costa Rica)
7 September 2014
20:30

Saint Kitts and Nevis	2–0	Guyana
Thomas 53'; Harris 60'	Report

Warner Park Sporting Complex, Basseterre
Referee: Henry Bejarano (Costa Rica)

=== Ranking of third place teams ===
Grp	Team	Pld	W	D	L	GF	GA	GD	Pts
5	Dominican Republic	3	1	0	2	11	3	+8	3
3	Bonaire	3	1	0	2	4	12	−8	3
4	Puerto Rico	3	0	2	1	5	6	−1	2
6	Guyana	3	0	1	2	0	4	−4	1

== Second round ==
Group winners and runners-up advanced to the final round.

=== Group 7 ===
Hosted in Trinidad and Tobago (UTC−4).

Team	Pld	W	D	L	GF	GA	GD	Pts
Trinidad and Tobago	3	3	0	0	9	1	+8	9
Antigua and Barbuda	3	1	1	1	2	2	0	4
Dominican Republic	3	1	1	1	4	8	−4	4
Saint Lucia	3	0	0	3	3	7	−4	0

8 October 2014
18:00

Antigua and Barbuda	2–1	Saint Lucia
Murtagh 67'; Parker 90+4'	Report	Frederick 42'

Ato Boldon Stadium, Couva
Referee: Trevor Taylor (Barbados)
8 October 2014
20:15

Trinidad and Tobago	6–1	Dominican Republic
Molino 2', 4', 24'; Jones 40', 54'; Caesar 75'	Report	Faña 88'

Ato Boldon Stadium, Couva
Referee: Kevin Morrison (Jamaica)

10 October 2014
18:00

Dominican Republic	0–0	Antigua and Barbuda
	Report

Ato Boldon Stadium, Couva
Referee: Dwight Royal (Jamaica)
10 October 2014
20:15

Trinidad and Tobago	2–0	Saint Lucia
Guerra 6'; Jones 67'	Report

Ato Boldon Stadium, Couva
Referee: Adrian Skeete (Barbados)

12 October 2014
16:00

Saint Lucia	2–3	Dominican Republic
Polius 77', 87'	Report	Faña 37' (pen.); K. Rodríguez 71'; Navarro 85'

Ato Boldon Stadium, Couva
Referee: Kevin Morrison (Jamaica)
12 October 2014
18:15

Trinidad and Tobago	1–0	Antigua and Barbuda
Molino 45'	Report

Ato Boldon Stadium, Couva
Referee: Trevor Taylor (Barbados)

=== Group 8 ===
Hosted in Haiti (UTC−4).

Team	Pld	W	D	L	GF	GA	GD	Pts
Haiti	3	1	2	0	6	4	+2	5
French Guiana	3	1	1	1	5	4	+1	4
Saint Kitts and Nevis	3	1	1	1	4	4	0	4
Barbados	3	1	0	2	5	8	−3	3

8 October 2014
17:00

Saint Kitts and Nevis	2–3	Barbados
Elliott 12'; Panayiotou 86'	Report	Joseph 16'; Lawrence 24', 29'

Stade Sylvio Cator, Port-au-Prince
Referee: Neal Brizan (Trinidad and Tobago)
8 October 2014
19:30

Haiti	2–2	French Guiana
Louis 29'; Alcénat 45+1'	Report	Solvi 30'; Legrand 54'

Stade Sylvio Cator, Port-au-Prince
Referee: Sandy Vásquez (Dominican Republic)

10 October 2014
17:00

French Guiana	1–2	Saint Kitts and Nevis
Gab. Pigrée 70'	Report	Mitchum 22'; Hanley 78'

Stade Sylvio Cator, Port-au-Prince
Referee: Juan Carlos Hidalgo (Dominican Republic)
10 October 2014
19:30

Haiti	4–2	Barbados
Belfort 3', 43'; Guerrier 27'; Alcénat 67'	Report	Harte 36'; Bertin 45' (o.g.)

Stade Sylvio Cator, Port-au-Prince
Referee: William Anderson (Puerto Rico)

12 October 2014
17:00

Barbados	0–2	French Guiana
	Report	Fabien 45'; Gab. Pigrée 55'

Stade Sylvio Cator, Port-au-Prince
Referee: Neal Brizan (Trinidad and Tobago)
12 October 2014
19:30

Haiti	0–0	Saint Kitts and Nevis
	Report

Stade Sylvio Cator, Port-au-Prince
Referee: William Anderson (Puerto Rico)

=== Group 9 ===
Hosted in Guadeloupe (UTC−4).

Team	Pld	W	D	L	GF	GA	GD	Pts
Martinique	3	2	1	0	7	5	+2	7
Curaçao	3	1	1	1	2	2	0	4
Guadeloupe	3	1	0	2	4	4	0	3
Saint Vincent and the Grenadines	3	1	0	2	5	7	−2	3

8 October 2014
18:00

Curaçao	1–1	Martinique
Merencia 90+1'	Report	Faubert 51'

Stade René Serge Nabajoth, Les Abymes
Referee: Christophel Stewart (Cayman Islands)
8 October 2014
20:30

Guadeloupe	3–1	Saint Vincent and the Grenadines
Gamiette 41'; Gotin 53'; Nestor 69'	Report	Samuel 46'

Stade René Serge Nabajoth, Les Abymes
Referee: Leo Clarke (Saint Lucia)

10 October 2014
18:00

Saint Vincent and the Grenadines	1–0	Curaçao
Anderson 4'	Report

Stade René Serge Nabajoth, Les Abymes
Referee: Bryan Willett (Antigua and Barbuda)
10 October 2014
20:30

Guadeloupe	1–2	Martinique
Vouteau 90+2'	Report	Faubert 4', 66'

Stade René Serge Nabajoth, Les Abymes
Referee: Wilson Da Costa (Bahamas)

12 October 2014
18:00

Martinique	4–3	Saint Vincent and the Grenadines
Crétinoir 53', 69'; Faubert 81', 85'	Report	Stewart 27', 60'; Anderson 66'

Stade René Serge Nabajoth, Les Abymes
Referee: Wilson Da Costa (Bahamas)
12 October 2014
20:30

Guadeloupe	0–1	Curaçao
	Report	Merencia 90+2'

Stade René Serge Nabajoth, Les Abymes
Referee: Leo Clarke (Saint Lucia)

== Goalscorers ==
8 goals

- (French Guiana) Gabriel Pigrée

5 goals

- (Martinique) Julien Faubert
- (Saint Vincent and the Grenadines) Oalex Anderson

4 goals

- (Dominican Republic) Jonathan Faña
- (Martinique) Gaël Germany
- (Trinidad and Tobago) Kevin Molino

3 goals

- (Antigua and Barbuda) Keiran Murtagh
- (Aruba) Dwayn Raven
- (Barbados) Mario Harte
- (Bonaire) Yurick Seinpaal
- (Dominican Republic) Kerbi Rodríguez
- (French Guiana) Fabrice Awong
- (Martinique) José-Thierry Goron
- (Trinidad and Tobago) Kenwyne Jones

2 goals

- (Antigua and Barbuda) Peter Byers
- (Antigua and Barbuda) Nathaniel Jarvis
- (Barbados) Carl Joseph
- (Barbados) Arantees Lawrence
- (Curaçao) Papito Merencia
- (Curaçao) Prince Rajcomar
- (Dominican Republic) Rony Beard
- (Dominican Republic) Domingo Peralta
- (French Guiana) Mickaël Solvi
- (Grenada) Terry James
- (Haiti) Jean Sony Alcénat
- (Haiti) Kervens Belfort
- (Martinique) Sébastien Crétinoir
- (Puerto Rico) Joseph Marrero
- (Puerto Rico) Héctor Ramos
- (Saint Kitts and Nevis) Atiba Harris
- (Saint Kitts and Nevis) Zephaniah Thomas
- (Saint Lucia) Zaccheus Polius
- (Saint Lucia) Cliff Valcin
- (Saint Vincent and the Grenadines) Myron Samuel
- (Saint Vincent and the Grenadines) Cornelius Stewart
- (Suriname) Miquel Cronie

1 goal

- (Antigua and Barbuda) Quinton Griffith
- (Antigua and Barbuda) Tevaughn Harriette
- (Antigua and Barbuda) Calaum Jahraldo-Martin
- (Antigua and Barbuda) Josh Parker
- (Antigua and Barbuda) Akeem Thomas
- (Aruba) Rensy Barradas
- (Aruba) Jelano Cruden
- (Aruba) Annuar Kock
- (Aruba) Emile Linkers
- (Aruba) Erik Santos de Gouveia
- (Barbados) Emmerson Boyce
- (Barbados) Romelle Burgess
- (Barbados) Romario Harewood
- (Barbados) Ricardo Morris
- (Bonaire) Suehendley Barzey
- (Bonaire) Jozef Beaumont
- (Bonaire) Lacey Pauletta
- (Curaçao) Shelton Martis
- (Curaçao) Gevaro Nepomuceno
- (Dominica) Julian Wade
- (Dominican Republic) Inoel Navarro
- (Dominican Republic) Samuel Zayas
- (French Guiana) Sergilio Atooman
- (French Guiana) Sylvio Breleur
- (French Guiana) Gilles Fabien
- (French Guiana) David Martinon
- (French Guiana) Orphéo Nalie
- (French Guiana) Gary Pigrée
- (French Guiana) Anthony Soubervie
- (Grenada) Kithson Bain
- (Grenada) Wendell Rennie
- (Guadeloupe) Thomas Gamiette
- (Guadeloupe) Ludovic Gotin
- (Guadeloupe) Loïc Nestor
- (Guadeloupe) Rudy Vouteau
- (Haiti) Wilde-Donald Guerrier
- (Haiti) Jean-David Legrand
- (Haiti) Jeff Louis
- (Martinique) Mathias Coureur
- (Montserrat) Jaylee Hodgson
- (Puerto Rico) Alex Oikkonen
- (Saint Kitts and Nevis) Devaughn Elliott
- (Saint Kitts and Nevis) Tishan Hanley
- (Saint Kitts and Nevis) Joash Leader
- (Saint Kitts and Nevis) Orlando Mitchum
- (Saint Kitts and Nevis) Harry Panayiotou
- (Saint Kitts and Nevis) Romaine Sawyers
- (Saint Lucia) Sheldon Emmanuel
- (Saint Lucia) Kurt Frederick
- (Saint Lucia) Tremain Paul
- (Saint Vincent and the Grenadines) Nazir McBurnette
- (Saint Vincent and the Grenadines) Azinho Solomon
- (Suriname) Jerny Faerber
- (Trinidad and Tobago) Trevin Caesar
- (Trinidad and Tobago) Ataullah Guerra
- (Turks and Caicos Islands) Stevens Derilien
- (Turks and Caicos Islands) Marc Fenelus
- (United States Virgin Islands) MacDonald Taylor, Jr.

Own goals

- (Anguilla) Kyle Kentish (playing against Dominican Republic)
- (Antigua and Barbuda) Karanja Mack (playing against Dominican Republic)
- (Barbados) Emmerson Boyce (playing against Martinique)
- (Dominica) Kervin Lawrence (playing against Saint Kitts and Nevis)
- (Haiti) Frantz Bertin (playing against Barbados)
- (Turks and Caicos Islands) Kely Louima (playing against French Guiana)
