= Edward Cruz =

Edward Cruz may refer to:

- Ted Cruz (born 1970), United States Senator from Texas, 2016 presidential candidate
- Edward Acevedo Cruz (born 1985), Dominican footballer
