= Gaël Germany =

Martiniquais footballer (born 1983)

Personal information
- Date of birth: May 10, 1983 (age 43)
- Place of birth: Sainte-Marie, Martinique
- Height: 1.85 m (6 ft 1 in)
- Position: Right midfielder

Team information
- Current team: Samaritaine

Youth career
- Sainte-Marie FC

Senior career*
Years	Team	Apps	(Gls)
2002–2007	Samaritaine	87	(15)
2007–2013	Arles-Avignon	77	(5)
2013	Paris FC	10	(0)
2013–2022	Samaritaine	?	(?)

International career^{‡}
2003–2014	Martinique	32	(7)
- * Club domestic league appearances and goals as of 1 July 2013 ‡ National team caps and goals as of 10 November 2014

Gaël Germany (born 10 May 1983) is a Martiniquais international footballer who currently plays for Samaritaine as a midfielder.

== Career ==
The defender began his career for Samaritaine Sainte-Marie and joined in December 2007 to Arles-Avignon.

=== International goals ===
Scores and results list Martinique's goal tally first.

No	Date	Venue	Opponent	Score	Result	Competition
1.	17 January 2007	Hasely Crawford Stadium, Port of Spain, Trinidad and Tobago	Barbados	3–1	3–2	2007 Caribbean Cup
2.	25 October 2012	Stade René Serge Nabajoth, Les Abymes, Guadeloupe	Dominican Republic	1–1	1–1	2012 Caribbean Cup qualification
3.	27 October 2012	Stade René Serge Nabajoth, Les Abymes, Guadeloupe	Guadeloupe	1–1	3–3	2012 Caribbean Cup qualification
4.	3 September 2014	Stade Pierre-Aliker, Fort-de-France, Martinique	Bonaire	1–0	6–0	2014 Caribbean Cup qualification
5.	3 September 2014	Stade Pierre-Aliker, Fort-de-France, Martinique	Bonaire	2–0	6–0	2014 Caribbean Cup qualification
6.	3 September 2014	Stade Pierre-Aliker, Fort-de-France, Martinique	Bonaire	4–0	6–0	2014 Caribbean Cup qualification
7.	5 September 2014	Stade Alfred Marie-Jeanne, Rivière-Pilote, Martinique	Barbados	2–2	3–2	2014 Caribbean Cup qualification
