= Samuel Zayas =

Dominican footballer

Personal information
- Date of birth: 16 February 1987 (age 39)
- Place of birth: Santo Domingo, Dominican Republic
- Height: 1.70 m (5 ft 7 in)
- Positions: Left winger; midfielder

Team information
- Current team: Cibao
- Number: 28

Senior career*
Years	Team	Apps	(Gls)
2005–2006	Solothurn	16	(3)
2008	Grenchen	9	(0)
2010–2011	FC Luterbach	25	(5)
2012–2014	Grenchen	54	(15)
2015	Breitenrain		
2015–	Cibao		

International career^{‡}
2014–	Dominican Republic	4	(1)
- * Club domestic league appearances and goals as of 8 November 2014 ‡ National team caps and goals as of 7 September 2014

Samuel Zayas (born 16 February 1987) is a Dominican footballer who plays as a forward for Cibao FC and the Dominican Republic national team.

== International career ==
Zayas made his international debut on 30 August 2014, when he was a starter in a lost friendly against El Salvador.

=== International goals ===
Scores and results list Dominican Republic's goal tally first.

No	Date	Venue	Opponent	Score	Result	Competition
1.	7 September 2014	Antigua Recreation Ground, St. John's, Antigua and Barbuda	Anguilla	10–0	10–0	2014 Caribbean Cup qualification
