= Kerbi Rodríguez =

Dominican footballer

Personal information
- Full name: Kelvin Rafael Rodríguez Pichardo
- Date of birth: June 1, 1989 (age 37)
- Place of birth: Esperanza, Dominican Republic
- Height: 1.75 m (5 ft 9 in)
- Position: Midfielder

Team information
- Current team: Cibao
- Number: 19

Senior career*
Years	Team	Apps	(Gls)
2007–2009	Barcelona Atlético		
2009–2012	FK Veternik		
2010–2012	→ FK Modriča (loan)	58	(16)
2012–2014	Moca FC	26	
2015	Barcelona Atlético	?	(7)
2016	Atlántico	?	(1)
2017–	Cibao	0	(0)

International career^{‡}
2006–2008	Dominican Republic U20	3	(6)
2006–	Dominican Republic	38	(10)
- * Club domestic league appearances and goals as of 24 August 2013 ‡ National team caps and goals as of 2 March 2017

Kelvin Rafael Rodríguez Pichardo (Note: In this Spanish name, the first or paternal surname is Rodríguez and the second or maternal family name is Pichardo.) (born 10 December 1985), commonly known as Kerbi Rodríguez, is a Dominican international football striker playing for Cibao FC in the Dominican first division.

== Club career ==
He played with Santo Domingo's Club Barcelona Atlético until 2009 when he moved to Europe together with Edward Acevedo Cruz and signed with Serbian club FK Veternik. In summer 2010 they both moved to neighboring Bosnia and Herzegovina, more precisely to the administrative division of Republika Srpska, to play on loan with FK Modriča.

== National team ==
Kerbi Rodríguez has been part of the Dominican national team since 2006. He was also part of the Dominican U-20 team during 2007.

=== International goals ===
Scores and results list Dominican Republic's goal tally first.

No	Date	Venue	Opponent	Score	Result	Competition
1.	1 October 2006	Lionel Roberts Park, Charlotte Amalie, U.S. Virgin Islands	U.S. Virgin Islands	5–1	6–1	2007 Caribbean Cup qualification
2.	11 November 2011	Estadio Panamericano, San Cristóbal, Dominican Republic	Cayman Islands	3–0	4–0	2014 FIFA World Cup qualification
3.	9 December 2012	Antigua Recreation Ground, St. John's, Antigua and Barbuda	Haiti	1–1	1–2	2012 Caribbean Cup
4.	11 December 2012	Antigua Recreation Ground, St. John's, Antigua and Barbuda	Trinidad and Tobago	1–1	1–2	2012 Caribbean Cup
5.	24 March 2013	Estadio Panamericano, San Cristóbal, Dominican Republic	Haiti	1–0	3–1	Friendly
6.	15 May 2014	Manahan Stadium, Surakarta, Indonesia	Indonesia	1–0	1–1	Friendly
7.	7 September 2014	Antigua Recreation Ground, St. John's, Antigua and Barbuda	Anguilla	3–0	10–0	2014 Caribbean Cup qualification
8.	7 September 2014	Antigua Recreation Ground, St. John's, Antigua and Barbuda	Anguilla	5–0	10–0	2014 Caribbean Cup qualification
9.	12 October 2014	Ato Boldon Stadium, Couva, Trinidad and Tobago	Saint Lucia	2–1	3–2	2014 Caribbean Cup qualification
10.	13 May 2015	Estadio Cibao, Santiago, Dominican Republic	Cayman Islands	1–0	6–0	Friendly

== Honours ==
Barcelona Atlético

- Primera División de Republica Dominicana: 2007, 2009

Cibao

- CFU Club Championship: 2017
