= Sébastien Crétinoir =

French footballer (born 1986)

Personal information
- Full name: Sébastien Antoine Crétinoir
- Date of birth: 12 February 1986 (age 40)
- Place of birth: Fort-de-France, Martinique
- Height: 1.88 m (6 ft 2 in)
- Position: Defender

Team information
- Current team: Samaritaine
- Number: 21

Senior career*
Years	Team	Apps	(Gls)
–2013	Club Colonial		
2013–2020	Golden Lion		
2020–	Samaritaine		

International career^{‡}
2004–2021	Martinique	66	(3)
- * Club domestic league appearances and goals ‡ National team caps and goals as of 21 July 2021

Sébastien Crétinoir (born 12 February 1986) is a Martiniquais professional footballer who plays as a defender for Martinique Championnat National club Samaritaine.

== International career ==
He made his debut for Martinique in 2004, but was not called up again until 2010. He was in the Martinique Gold Cup squads for the 2013 and 2017 tournaments.

== Career statistics ==
Scores and results list Martinique's goal tally first, score column indicates score after each Crétinoir goal.

List of international goals scored by Sébastien Crétinoir
No.	Date	Venue	Opponent	Score	Result	Competition
1	12 October 2014	Stade René Serge Nabajoth, Les Abymes, Guadeloupe	Saint Vincent and the Grenadines	1–1	4–3	2014 Caribbean Cup qualification
2	12 October 2014	Stade René Serge Nabajoth, Les Abymes, Guadeloupe	Saint Vincent and the Grenadines	2–3	4–3	2014 Caribbean Cup qualification
3	19 November 2018	Stade Pierre-Aliker, Fort-de-France, Martinique	Antigua and Barbuda	2–1	4–2	2019–20 CONCACAF Nations League qualification
