= Fabrice Awong =

Footballer (born 1991)

Personal information
- Date of birth: 14 February 1991 (age 35)
- Place of birth: France
- Positions: Winger; forward

Senior career*
Years	Team	Apps	(Gls)
2011–2013	Club Lemos		
2013–2014	Kallithea	15	(1)
2015	Iraklis Psachna		

International career
2014	French Guiana	3	(3)
- * Club domestic league appearances and goals

Fabrice Awong (born 14 February 1991) is a former professional footballer who played as a winger or forward. Born in metropolitan France, he played for the French Guiana national team, making three appearances. Besides in France, he has played in Greece and Spain.

== Career ==
In 2011, Awong signed for Spanish sixth division tier Club Lemos. In 2013, he signed for Kallithea in the Greek second tier, where he made 17 appearances and scored 1 goal. On 15 September 2013, Awong debuted for Kallithea during a 1–0 win over AO Glyfada. on 9 March 2014, he scored his first goal for Kallithea during a 5–0 win over AO Glyfada. In 2015, he signed for Iraklis Psachna.
