= Sylvio Breleur =

French footballer (born 1978)

Personal information
- Date of birth: 13 October 1978 (age 48)
- Place of birth: Cayenne, French Guiana
- Height: 1.81 m (5 ft 11 in)
- Position: Striker

Senior career*
Years	Team	Apps	(Gls)
1998–2000	ASL Sport Guyanais		
2000–2002	Levallois SC	25	(11)
2002–2004	Saint-Gratien	29	(11)
2004–2005	Ronse	28	(10)
2005–2007	Zulte-Waregem	4	(0)
2008	ASC Le Geldar		
2008–2010	R.F.C. Tournai	50	(14)
2010–2011	K.V. Oostende	26	(6)
2011–2013	R.F.C. Tournai	20	(3)
2013–2015	Sassport Boezinge		
2015–2016	R.F.C. Tournai		

International career
2004–2016	French Guiana	11	(3)
- * Club domestic league appearances and goals

Sylvio Breleur (born 13 October 1978) is a French former professional footballer who played as a striker. He represented the French Guiana national team at international level.

== Career statistics ==
Scores and results list French Guiana's goal tally first, score column indicates score after each Breleur goal.

List of international goals scored by Sylvio Breleur
No.	Date	Venue	Opponent	Score	Result	Competition
1.	14 November 2004	Stade Pierre-Aliker, Fort-de-France, Martinique	Dominica	3–0	4–0	2005 Caribbean Cup qualification
2.	14 November 2004	Stade Pierre-Aliker, Fort-de-France, Martinique	Dominica	4–0	4–0	2005 Caribbean Cup qualification
3.	3 September 2014	Juan Ramón Loubriel Stadium, Bayamón, Puerto Rico	Grenada	1–1	1–1	2014 Caribbean Cup qualification
