= Alain Mogès =

French Guianan footballer (born 1992)

Personal information
- Date of birth: 22 July 1992 (age 34)
- Place of birth: French Guiana, France
- Position: Defender

Team information
- Current team: Alès

Youth career
- USL Montjoly
- AP Calais
- Calais

Senior career*
Years	Team	Apps	(Gls)
2013–2016	Calais	35	(2)
2016–2017	Harlow Town	10	(0)
2016–2017	Salford City (dual registration)	0	(0)
2017–2021	Angoulême	64	(7)
2021–	Alès	21	(4)

International career^{‡}
2014–	French Guiana	8	(0)
- * Club domestic league appearances and goals as of 02:12, 5 May 2022 (UTC) ‡ National team caps and goals as of 02:12, 5 May 2022 (UTC)

Alain Mogès (born 22 July 1992) a French Guianan professional footballer who plays as a defender for Championnat National 3 club Alès and the French Guiana national team.

== Club career ==
After starting football at USL Montjoly in his native French Guiana, Mogès moved to metropolitan France, where he played for the youth team at Amicale Pascal Calais. In 2013, he played with the first team of Calais, with which he won the second group of the Championnat de France Amateur.

In summer 2016, Mogès joined English club Harlow Town, making thirteen appearances and being named player of the match on two occasions. In November 2016, he joined Salford City on dual registration terms, and made his debut for the club in a Manchester Premier Cup tie at Hyde United.

In 2021, after four years with Angoulême, Mogès signed for Alès.

== International career ==
Mogès made his debut for the French Guiana national team in 2014.
