= Papito Merencia =

Curaçao footballer

Personal information
- Full name: Vidarrell Eugenio Merencia
- Date of birth: 4 March 1994 (age 32)
- Place of birth: Willemstad, Curaçao
- Height: 1.70 m (5 ft 7 in)
- Position: Attacking midfielder

Team information
- Current team: RVVH
- Number: 6

Youth career
- –2013: ADO Den Haag

Senior career*
Years	Team	Apps	(Gls)
2013–2015	ADO Den Haag	4	(0)
2016–	RVVH		

International career
2013	Curaçao U20	2	(0)
2013–2016	Curaçao	16	(4)
- * Club domestic league appearances and goals as of 15 December 2017

Vidarrell Eugenio "Papito" Merencia (born 4 March 1994) is a Curaçaoan professional footballer who plays as a midfielder for RVVH.

== International ==
Merencia made his international debut on 14 November 2014 in an ABCS Tournament match against Aruba. He was then part of Curaçao's squad during 2014 Caribbean Cup qualification. He scored his first international goal during the qualification process, a game-tying 90th-minute strike against Martinique.

=== International goals ===
Scores and results list Curaçao's goal tally first.

#	Date	Venue	Opponent	Score	Result	Competition
1.	8 October 2014	Stade René Serge Nabajoth, Les Abymes, Guadeloupe	Martinique	1–1	1–1	2014 Caribbean Cup qualification
2.	12 October 2014	Stade René Serge Nabajoth, Les Abymes, Guadeloupe	Guadeloupe	1–0	1–0	2014 Caribbean Cup qualification
3.	27 March 2015	Ergilio Hato Stadium, Willemstad, Curaçao	Montserrat	1–0	2–1	2018 FIFA World Cup qualification
4.	20 May 2015	Mitsubishi Forklift Stadion, Alkmaar, Netherlands	Suriname	2–1	3–2	Friendly match
5.	14 June 2015	Estadio Pedro Marrero, Havana, Cuba	Cuba	1–1	1–1	2018 FIFA World Cup qualification
