= Upston Edwards =

Jamaican footballer (born 1989)

Personal information
- Full name: Upston Junior Edwards
- Date of birth: 12 October 1989 (age 37)
- Position: Defender

Team information
- Current team: Central F.C.
- Number: 29

Senior career*
Years	Team	Apps	(Gls)
2011–	Portmore United	52	(1)
2014	→ Waterhouse F.C. (loan)	5	(0)
2015	→ Central F.C.	0	(0)

International career^{‡}
2013–	Jamaica	4	(0)
- * Club domestic league appearances and goals as of 8 June 2014 ‡ National team caps and goals as of 8 June 2014

Upston Junior Edwards (born 12 October 1989) is a Jamaican international footballer who plays for Central F.C., as a defender.

== Career ==
=== Club ===
Edwards has played club football for Portmore United. Edwards played for Waterhouse while on loan in 2014. In 2015, he was loaned to Central F.C. in Trinidad.

=== International ===
He made his international debut for Jamaica in 2013.
