= Marvin Torvic =

French Guiananese footballer (born 1988)

Personal information
- Full name: Marvin Grégory Edward Torvic
- Date of birth: 5 January 1988 (age 38)
- Place of birth: Sinnamary, French Guiana
- Height: 1.93 m (6 ft 4 in)
- Position: Centre back

Team information
- Current team: Etoile Matoury

College career
Years	Team	Apps	(Gls)
2007–2009	Newberry Wolves	53	(7)

Senior career*
Years	Team	Apps	(Gls)
2010–2011	Lorient B	0	(0)
2011	CF Portal del Caroig		
2011–2013	US Sinnamary		
2013–2014	PS Kemi	19	(0)
2014–2015	TSV 1860 Rosenheim	22	(1)
2015–2016	US Matoury		
2016–2017	Campobasso Calcio	9	(0)
2018–	Etoile Matoury		

International career
2012–2019	French Guiana	31	(1)
- * Club domestic league appearances and goals as of 29 January 2017

Marvin Grégory Edward Torvic (born 5 January 1988) is a French Guianan footballer who plays for Etoile Matoury and the French Guiana national team.

== Club career ==
Torvic is a graduate of South Aiken High School and Newberry College, South Carolina. He has previously played for FC Lorient reserves in France and US Sinnamary in the French Guiana Championnat National. In February 2013 Torvic signed for Finnish side PS Kemi. In July 2014 he signed for German club TSV 1860 Rosenheim of the fifth-tier Bayernliga.

== International career ==
Torvic was capped 31 times for the French Guiana national team. He was a member of the French Guiana 2012 Caribbean Cup squad.

== Career statistics ==
Scores and results list French Guiana's goal tally first, score column indicates score after each Torvic goal.

List of international goals scored by Marvin Torvic
No.	Date	Venue	Opponent	Score	Result	Competition
1	25 March 2015	Stade Municipal Dr. Edmard Lama, Remire-Montjoly, French Guiana	Honduras	1–1	3–1	2015 CONCACAF Gold Cup qualification

== Coaching career ==
Torvic signed with Athletes Untapped as a private soccer coach on Jul 4, 2024.
