= Keiran Murtagh =

English footballer (born 1988)

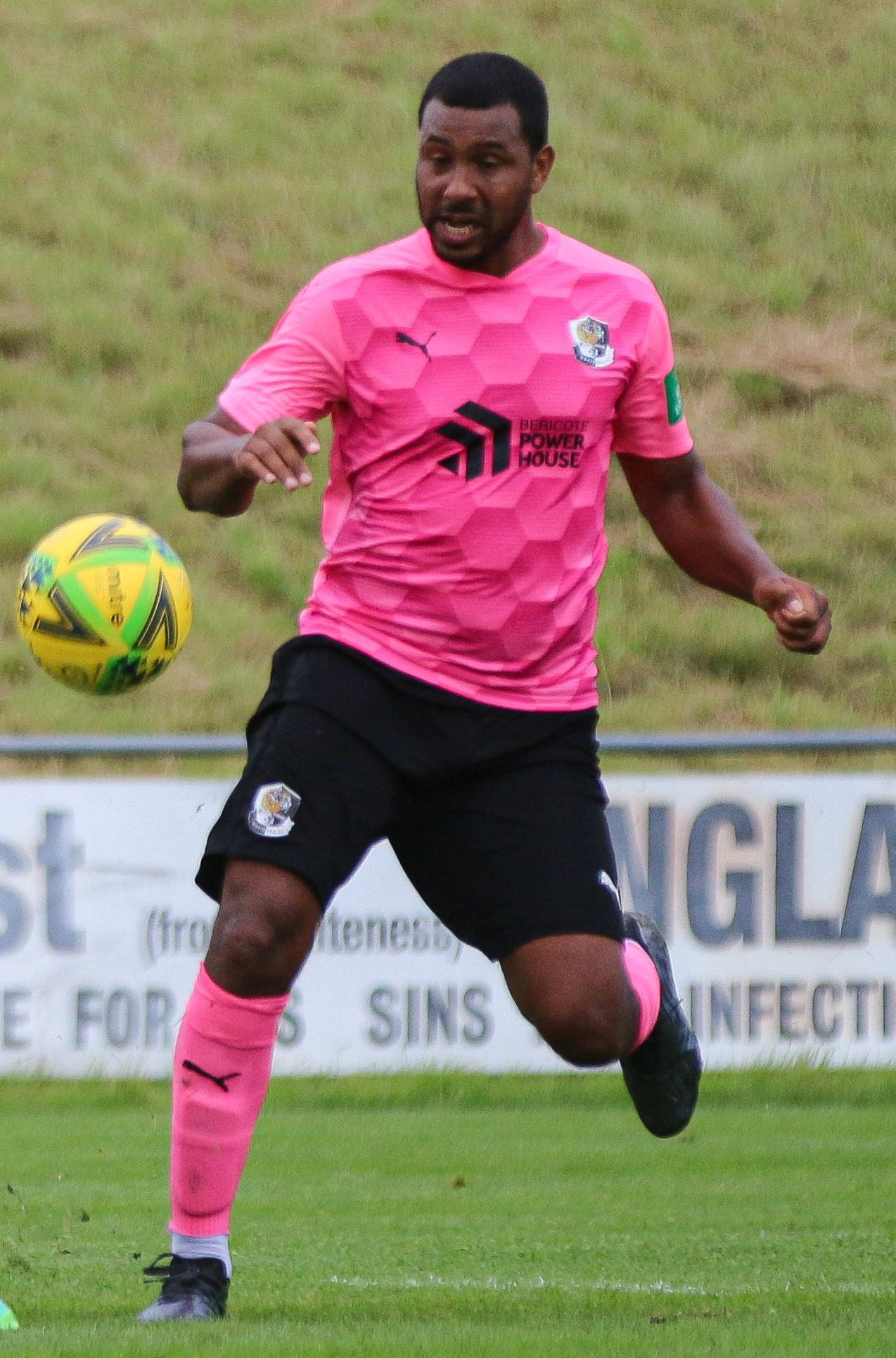
- Murtagh playing for Dartford in August 2021.

Personal information
- Full name: Keiran Zac Murtagh
- Date of birth: 29 October 1988 (age 38)
- Place of birth: Wapping, England
- Height: 6 ft 2 in (1.88 m)
- Position: Midfielder

Youth career
- 2004–2007: Charlton Athletic

Senior career*
Years	Team	Apps	(Gls)
2007–2008	Fisher Athletic	26	(1)
2008–2010	Yeovil Town	53	(3)
2010–2011	Wycombe Wanderers	7	(0)
2011	→ Woking (loan)	12	(5)
2011–2012	Cambridge United	7	(0)
2011–2012	→ Woking (loan)	19	(2)
2012–2013	Macclesfield Town	39	(2)
2013–2014	Mansfield Town	3	(0)
2013–2014	→ Woking (loan)	21	(3)
2014–2017	Woking	112	(7)
2017–2021	Boreham Wood	154	(11)
2021–2023	Dartford	69	(4)
2023–2024	Lewes	21	(0)
Total		543	(38)

International career
2005	Republic of Ireland U17		
2010–2016	Antigua and Barbuda	22	(5)
- * Club domestic league appearances and goals

Keiran Zac Murtagh (born 29 October 1988) is a former footballer who represented Antigua and Barbuda at international level.

== Club career ==
Murtagh joined Conference South side Fisher Athletic in November 2007, in his only season at the London club in a season where he made 21 appearances and scored one goal. He was made Fisher's young player of the year for the 2007–08 season. Murtagh was much sought-after at the end of 2007–08, having impressed many with his performances for Fisher Athletic.

Even though he had trials for Premier League and Championship clubs, Fulham and Nottingham Forest respectively, he signed for League One club Yeovil Town. After being tracked he was finally signed on a two-year contract, on 12 June 2008. He made his debut for Yeovil Town as a substitute in the 1–1 home draw against Walsall, on 9 August 2008. In his first season with Yeovil he made 26 appearances.

Murtagh scored his first goal, with a thirty-yard strike, against Huddersfield Town in a 2–1 defeat 29 August 2009. He was offered a new contract on 13 May 2010, but rejected it in favour of a move to Wycombe Wanderers where he signed a one-year contract.

On 31 January 2011, Murtagh signed a one-month loan deal with Conference South club Woking, subsequently extended for a further month. He was recalled to his parent club on 23 March to provide cover in their midfield.

On 10 June 2011, Murtagh signed a two-year deal with Conference National side Cambridge United.

On 29 December 2011, it was announced that Murtagh would join former club Woking on loan until the end of the season.

After leaving Cambridge United, Murtagh spent the 2012–13 season at Macclesfield Town before moving on to play for League two side Mansfield Town. However, he was unable to make regular appearance in the starting lineup and midway through the 2013–14 season, came back down to Woking on loan for a third spell.

Once his contract ended at Mansfield Town, Murtagh signed a permanent contract with The Cards for the 2014–15 season.

On 9 June 2017, he signed for Boreham Wood on a two-year deal.

On 13 June 2021, Murtagh signed for Dartford.

On 25 May 2023, it was confirmed that Murtagh had left Dartford after two seasons at the club.

On 7 July 2023, it was announced that Murtagh had signed for Isthmian League Premier Division club Lewes.

== International career ==
Murtagh represented the Republic of Ireland U17 side while playing for Charlton Athletic.

On 25 November 2010, Murtagh was called up to the Antigua and Barbuda squad for the 2010 Caribbean Championship. He made his debut in the 3–1 defeat against Jamaica on 27 November.

== Career statistics ==
=== Club ===
As of match played 6 April 2024

Appearances and goals by club, season and competition
Club	Season	League			FA Cup		League Cup		Other		Total	
Club	Season	Division	Apps	Goals	Apps	Goals	Apps	Goals	Apps	Goals	Apps	Goals
Fisher Athletic	2007–08	Conference South	26	1	0	0	—		2 (Note: Two appearances in the Conference South play-offs)	0	28	1
Yeovil Town	2008–09	League One	26	0	1	0	2	0	1 (Note: One appearance in the Football League Trophy)	0	30	0
Yeovil Town	2009–10	League One	27	3	1	0	0	0	1 (Note: One appearance in the Football League Trophy)	0	29	3
Yeovil Town	Yeovil Town total		53	3	2	0	2	0	2	0	59	3
Wycombe Wanderers	2010–11	League Two	7	0	0	0	1	0	2 (Note: Two appearances in the Football League Trophy)	0	10	0
Woking (loan)	2010–11	Conference South	12	5	0	0	—		1 (Note: One appearance in the FA Trophy)	0	13	5
Cambridge United	2011–12	Conference Premier	7	0	1	0	—		1 (Note: One appearance in the FA Trophy)	0	9	0
Woking (loan)	2011–12	Conference South	19	2	—		—		4 (Note: Four appearances in the Surrey Senior Cup)	0	23	2
Macclesfield Town	2012–13	Conference Premier	39	2	6	0	—		0	0	45	2
Mansfield Town	2013–14	League Two	3	0	0	0	0	0	1 (Note: One appearances in the Football League Trophy)	0	4	0
Woking (loan)	2013–14	Conference Premier	21	3	0	0	—		5 (Note: Two appearances in the FA Trophy, three appearances in the Surrey Senior Cup)	0	26	3
Woking	2014–15	Conference Premier	34	0	1	0	—		6 (Note: Five appearances in the FA Trophy, one appearance in the Surrey Senior Cup)	0	41	0
Woking	2015–16	National League	38	4	1	0	—		7 (Note: Four appearances and two goals in the FA Trophy, three appearances in the Surrey Senior Cup)	2	46	6
Woking	2016–17	National League	40	3	3	0	—		2 (Note: One appearance in the FA Trophy, one appearance in the Surrey Senior Cup)	0	45	3
Woking	Woking total		164	17	5	0	—		25	2	194	19
Boreham Wood	2017–18	National League	44	1	3	0	—		6 (Note: Three appearances and one goal in the FA Trophy, three appearances in the National League play-offs)	1	53	2
Boreham Wood	2018–19	National League	43	8	3	0	—		3 (Note: Two appearances in the FA Trophy, one appearance in the Scottish Challenge Cup)	0	49	8
Boreham Wood	2019–20	National League	31	1	1	0	—		3 (Note: One appearance in the FA Trophy, two appearances in the National League play-offs)	0	35	1
Boreham Wood	2020–21	National League	36	1	2	0	—		1 (Note: One appearance in the FA Trophy)	0	39	1
Boreham Wood	Boreham Wood total		154	11	9	0	—		13	1	176	12
Dartford	2021–22	National League South	30	3	2	0	—		8 (Note: One appearance in the London Senior Cup) (Note: Three appearances in the Kent Senior Cup) (Note: Four appearances in the FA Trophy)	0	40	3
Dartford	2022–23	National League South	39	1	1	0	—		4 (Note: Two appearances and one goal in the London Senior Cup) (Note: One appearance in the Kent Senior Cup) (Note: One appearance in the National League South Play-Offs)	1	44	2
Dartford	Dartford total		69	4	3	0	—		12	1	84	5
Lewes	2023–24	Isthmian League Premier Division	21	0	3	0	—		1 (Note: One appearance in the FA Trophy)	0	25	0
Career total			543	38	29	0	3	0	59	4	634	42

=== International ===
As of match played 7 June 2016

Appearances and goals by national team and year
National team	Year	Apps	Goals
Antigua and Barbuda national team	2010	2	0
Antigua and Barbuda national team	2011	3	1
Antigua and Barbuda national team	2012	5	0
Antigua and Barbuda national team	2013	0	0
Antigua and Barbuda national team	2014	9	3
Antigua and Barbuda national team	2015	1	0
Antigua and Barbuda national team	2016	2	1
Total		22	5

==== International goals ====
As of match played 7 June 2016. Antigua and Barbuda score listed first, score column indicates score after each Murtagh goal.

International goals by date, venue, cap, opponent, score, result and competition
No.	Date	Venue	Cap	Opponent	Score	Result	Competition
1	11 October 2011	Sir Vivian Richards Stadium, Antigua, Antigua and Barbuda	4	U.S. Virgin Islands	10–0	10–0	2014 FIFA World Cup qualification
2	3 September 2014	Antigua Recreation Ground, St. John's, Antigua and Barbuda	11	Anguilla	2–0	6–0	2014 Caribbean Cup qualification
3	3 September 2014	Antigua Recreation Ground, St. John's, Antigua and Barbuda	11	Anguilla	6–0	6–0	2014 Caribbean Cup qualification
4	8 October 2014	Ato Boldon Stadium, Couva, Trinidad & Tobago	14	Saint Lucia	1–1	2–1	2014 Caribbean Cup qualification
5	7 June 2016	Sir Vivian Richards Stadium, Antigua, Antigua and Barbuda	21	Grenada	3–1	5–1	2017 Caribbean Cup qualification
