= Gabriel Pigrée =

French footballer (born 1985)

Personal information
- Date of birth: 18 March 1985 (age 41)
- Place of birth: Sarcelles, France
- Position: Forward

Senior career*
Years	Team	Apps	(Gls)
2003–2006	CS Saint-Denis	68	(28)
2008–2008	US Sainte-Marienne	40	(31)
2008	SS Jeanne d'Arc	6	(4)
2008–2009	US Sainte-Marienne	44	(41)
2010	AS Excelsior	28	(12)
2011	AS Marsouins	15	(4)
2012–2013	AJ Petite-Île	39	(27)
2013–2014	Trélissac	24	(5)
2014–2016	US Lège Cap Ferret		

International career
2007	Reunion	6	(4)
2014–2016	French Guiana	15	(8)
- * Club domestic league appearances and goals

Gabriel Pigrée (born 18 March 1985) is a former footballer who played as a forward. Born in metropolitan France, he represented French Guiana at international level.

== International career ==
Pigrée has been capped at full international level by Reunion and French Guiana. He was the competition's top-scorer in the 2014 Caribbean Cup qualification stage, scoring eight goals for French Guiana, including a hat-trick against Turks and Caicos Islands.

== Career statistics ==
#	Date	Venue	Opponent	Score	Result	Competition
1.	30 May 2014	Trinidad Stadium, Oranjestad, Aruba	British Virgin Islands	2–0	6–0	2014 Caribbean Cup qualification
2.	1 June 2014	Trinidad Stadium, Oranjestad, Aruba	Turks and Caicos Islands	1–0	6–0	2014 Caribbean Cup qualification
3.	1 June 2014	Trinidad Stadium, Oranjestad, Aruba	Turks and Caicos Islands	2–0	6–0	2014 Caribbean Cup qualification
4.	1 June 2014	Trinidad Stadium, Oranjestad, Aruba	Turks and Caicos Islands	6–0	6–0	2014 Caribbean Cup qualification
5.	5 September 2014	Juan Ramón Loubriel Stadium, Bayamón, Puerto Rico	Puerto Rico	1–1	2–1	2014 Caribbean Cup qualification
6.	5 September 2014	Juan Ramón Loubriel Stadium, Bayamón, Puerto Rico	Puerto Rico	2–1	2–1	2014 Caribbean Cup qualification
7.	10 October 2014	Stade Sylvio Cator, Port-au-Prince, Haiti	Saint Kitts and Nevis	1–1	1–2	2014 Caribbean Cup qualification
8.	12 October 2014	Stade Sylvio Cator, Port-au-Prince, Haiti	Barbados	1–0	2–0	2014 Caribbean Cup qualification
