= Stade Alfred Marie-Jeanne =

Stadium in Rivière-Pilote, Martinique

Coordinates: 14°29′02″N 60°54′33″W

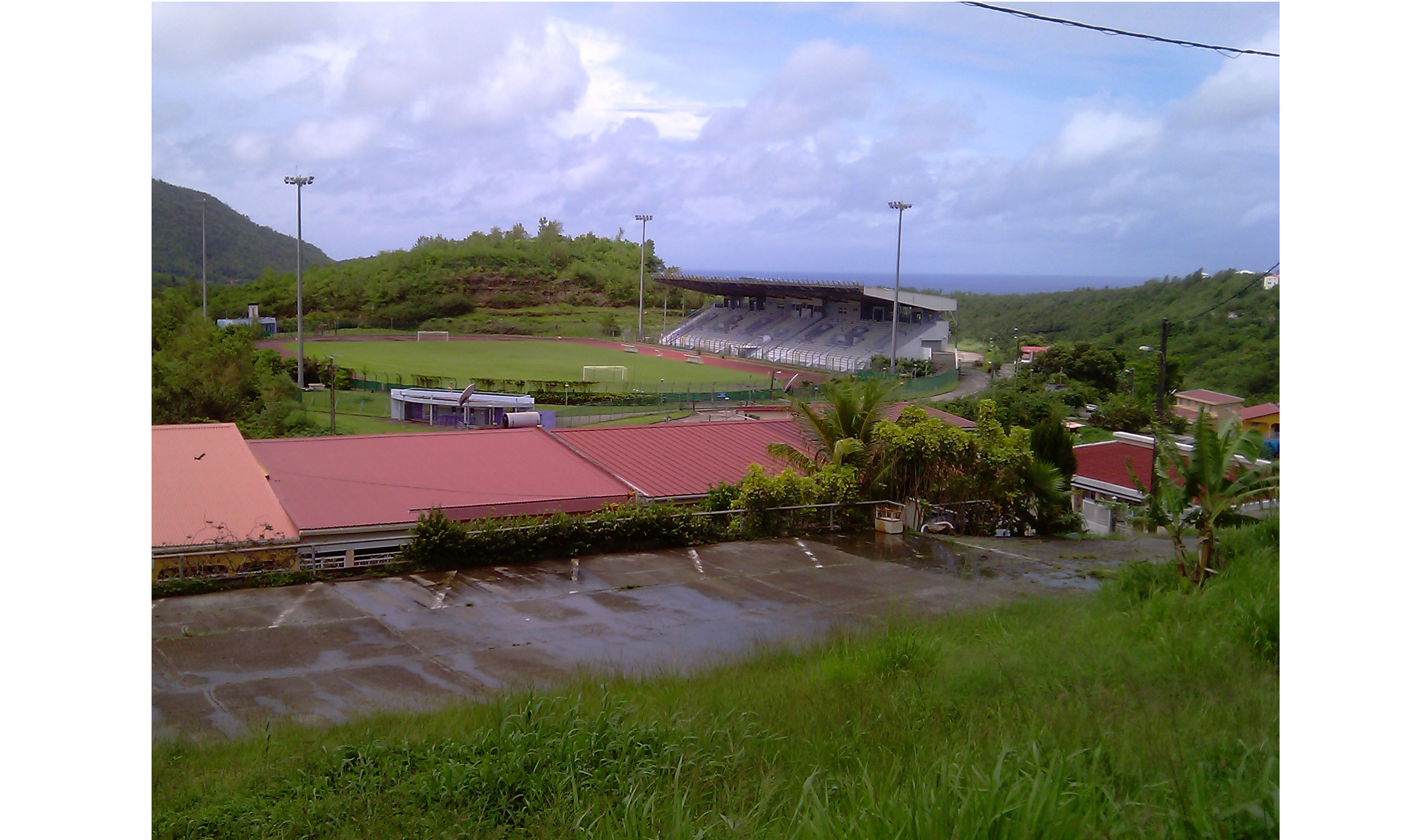
- Interactive map of Stade Alfred Marie-Jeanne
- Former names: Stade (municipal) En Camée
- Location: Rivière-Pilote, Martinique, France
- Owner: Commune of Rivière-Pilote
- Capacity: 3,000

Construction
- Opened: 1991

Tenant
- Racing Club de Rivière-Pilote

The Stade Alfred Marie-Jeanne, until August 2011 Stade En Camée, is a multi-purpose stadium located in Rivière-Pilote, Martinique, an overseas department of France. It is currently used mostly for football matches and is set to be utilized as a venue for the 2010 Caribbean Championship.
