= Montego Bay Sports Complex =

Sports stadium Montego Bay, Jamaica

- Catherine Hall Sports Complex
- Interactive map of Montego Bay Sports Complex
- Full name: Montego Bay Sports Complex
- Location: Catherine Hall, Montego Bay
- Coordinates: 18.457930°N 77.921388°W
- Capacity: 7,000
- Surface: Grass

Construction
- Opened: 5 June 2010

Tenants
- Montego Bay United; Jamaica national football team (selected matches); Jamaica women's national football team (selected matches)

Montego Bay Sports Complex (sometimes referred to as Catherine Hall Sports Complex) is a multi-purpose sports stadium in the Catherine Hall area of the city of Montego Bay, Jamaica. It is also the home field for Montego Bay United. The stadium capacity is 7,000.

In April 2011 it hosted the 40th edition of the Carifta Games.

In July 2014, it was announced as a host venue for the CONCACAF U-20 Championship.

In October 2014, the venue was announced the host for the final round of the 2014 Caribbean Cup.

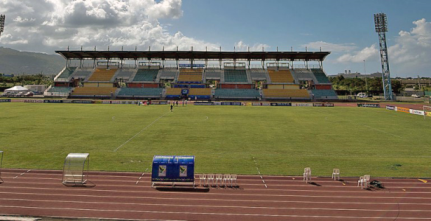
The main stand at the Montego Bay Sports Complex

Jamaica hosted the Under-20 Championship in January 2015, with the Montego Bay Stadium one of the two stadium used for the tournament. The ground hosted a total of 24 games, including the final between Panama and Mexico on 24 January.

Hurricane Melissa in 2025 rendered the complex unusable.
