= 2009 CONCACAF Gold Cup knockout stage =

Second and final stage of the competition

The knockout stage of the 2009 CONCACAF Gold Cup was the second and final stage of the competition, following the group stage. Played from 18 to 26 July, the knockout stage ended with the final, held at Giants Stadium in East Rutherford. The top two teams from each group, along with the two best-placed third teams, advanced to the knockout stage to compete in a single-elimination tournament. There were 7 matches in the knockout stage.

== Format ==
The knockout stage of the 2009 CONCACAF Gold Cup was contested between 8 teams that qualified from the group stage. Matches in the knockout stage were played to a finish. If the score of a match was level at the end of 90 minutes of playing time, extra time was played. If, after two periods of 15 minutes, the scores were still tied, the match was decided by a penalty shoot-out.

== Qualified teams ==
The top two placed teams from each of the six groups, along with the four best-placed third teams, qualified for the knockout phase.

Group	Winners	Runners-up	Third-placed teams (Best two qualify)
A	Canada	Costa Rica	—
B	United States	Honduras	Haiti
C	Mexico	Guadeloupe	Nicaragua

== Bracket ==
The tournament bracket is shown below, with bold denoting the winners of each match.

Quarter-finals
18 July – Philadelphia
Canada	0
**Honduras**	**1**
18 July – Philadelphia
**United States (a.e.t.)**	**2**
Panama	1
19 July – Arlington
Guadeloupe	1
**Costa Rica**	**5**
19 July – Arlington
**Mexico**	**4**
Haiti	0

Semi-finals
23 July – Chicago
Honduras	0
**United States**	**2**
23 July – Chicago
Costa Rica	1 (3)
**Mexico (p)**	**1 (5)**

Final
26 July – East Rutherford
United States	0
**Mexico**	**5**

== Quarter-finals ==
The quarter-finals opened with a double-header at Lincoln Financial Field in Philadelphia on July 18. The first match featured Canada and Honduras. The nightcap featured the United States and Panama.

The remaining two quarter-final matches were played the next day, again as a double-header, at Cowboys Stadium in Arlington, Texas; being the first match featured by Guadeloupe and Costa Rica; and Mexico and Haiti featuring the nightcap.

=== Canada vs Honduras ===
18 July 2009
17:00 UTC-4

Canada	0–1	Honduras
	Report	Martínez 36' (pen.)

Lincoln Financial Field, Philadelphia
Attendance: 32,000
Referee: Joel Aguilar (El Salvador)

CANADA:
GK	1	Greg Sutton
RB	7	Paul Stalteri (c)	(yellow card) 35'
CB	5	Kevin McKenna	(yellow card) 60'
CB	14	Dejan Jakovic
LB	3	Mike Klukowski
DM	20	Patrice Bernier
RM	10	Will Johnson		(substituted off) 71'
CM	6	Julian de Guzman
CM	13	Atiba Hutchinson
LM	15	Josh Simpson		(substituted off) 76'
CF	9	Ali Gerba
Substitutions:
MF	17	Jaime Peters		(substituted in) 71'
FW	16	Simeon Jackson		(substituted in) 76'
Manager:
(Trinidad and Tobago) Stephen Hart

HONDURAS:
GK	22	Donis Escober
RB	16	Nery Medina
CB	5	Erick Norales
CB	2	Osman Chávez
LB	14	Carlos Palacios
DM	11	Mariano Acevedo
CM	23	Roger Espinoza	(yellow card) 24'	(substituted off) 90'
RW	15	Walter Martínez (c)		(substituted off) 71'
LW	18	Melvin Valladares
CF	10	Marvin Chávez		(substituted off) 81'
CF	13	Carlo Costly	(yellow card) 27'
Substitutions:
FW	8	Allan Lalín		(substituted in) 71'
DF	4	Johnny Palacios		(substituted in) 81'
FW	9	Carlos Mejía		(substituted in) 90'
Manager:
(Colombia) Reynaldo Rueda

Man of the Match:
(Honduras) Walter Martínez

Assistant referees:
(El Salvador) William Torres
(Costa Rica) Leonel Leal
Fourth official:
(Mexico) Marco Antonio Rodríguez

=== United States vs Panama ===
18 July 2009
20:00 UTC-4

United States	2–1 (a.e.t.)	Panama
Beckerman 49'; Cooper 106' (pen.)	Report	Pérez 45+1'

Lincoln Financial Field, Philadelphia
Attendance: 31,087
Referee: Benito Archundia (Mexico)

UNITED STATES:
GK	1	Troy Perkins
DF	12	Jimmy Conrad (c) (yellow card) 11' (substituted off) 45'
DF	4	Chad Marshall
DF	16	Jay Heaps
DF	2	Heath Pearce
MF	8	Logan Pause
MF	5	Kyle Beckerman
MF	7	Robbie Rogers (substituted off) 110'
MF	10	Stuart Holden
MF	22	Davy Arnaud (substituted off) 77'
FW	11	Brian Ching
Substitutes
DF	3	Clarence Goodson (substituted in) 45'
FW	17	Kenny Cooper (substituted in) 77'
MF	21	Brad Evans (substituted in) 110'
Manager
(United States) Bob Bradley

PANAMA:
GK	1	Jaime Penedo (yellow card) 106'
DF	23	Felipe Baloy (c) (yellow card) 63' (yellow-red card) 120'
DF	3	Luis Moreno
DF	5	Román Torres (yellow card) 105'
DF	14	Armando Gun (substituted off) 108'
MF	20	Rolando Escobar (substituted off) 78'
MF	6	Gabriel Gómez
MF	16	Manuel Torres
MF	10	Nelson Barahona (substituted off) 95'
FW	9	José Garcés
FW	7	Blas Pérez (yellow card) 25'
Substitutes
MF	15	Ricardo Phillips (substituted in) 78'
MF	11	Víctor Herrera (substituted in) 95'
FW	18	Luis Tejada (substituted in) 108' (red card) 120'
Manager
(England) Gary Stempel

Man of the Match
(United States) Kyle Beckerman
Assistant referees
(Mexico) Hector Delgadillo
(Mexico) Luis Camargo
Fourth official
(Costa Rica) Walter Quesada

=== Guadeloupe vs Costa Rica ===
19 July 2009
15:00 UTC-5

Guadeloupe	1–5	Costa Rica
Alphonse 64'	Report	Borges 3'; Saborío 16', 71'; Herrón 47'; Herrera 89'

Cowboys Stadium, Arlington
Attendance: 85,000
Referee: Jose Pineda (Honduras)

Guadeloupe
GK	16	Marius Fausta
DF	4	Cédric Avinel
DF	15	Miguel Comminges
DF	3	Mickaël Tacalfred
DF	5	Eddy Viator
MF	10	Aurélien Capoue (yellow card) 85'
MF	18	Thomas Gamiette (yellow card) 36' (substituted off) 80'
MF	8	Stéphane Auvray (c)
MF	20	Larry Clavier (substituted off) 68'
FW	7	Loïc Loval (substituted off) 76'
FW	22	Alexandre Alphonse
Substitutes
FW	11	Mickaël Antoine-Curier (substituted in) 68'
MF	19	Grégory Gendrey (substituted in) 76'
MF	13	Jean-Luc Lambourde (substituted in) 80'
Manager
(Guadeloupe) Roger Salnot

**Costa Rica**
GK	1	Keylor Navas
DF	15	Harold Wallace (yellow card) 45'
DF	3	Freddy Fernández
DF	20	Dennis Marshall
DF	2	Darío Delgado
MF	5	Celso Borges
MF	6	Cristian Oviedo
MF	14	Armando Alonso (substituted off) 69'
FW	11	Andy Herrón (substituted off) 76'
FW	9	Álvaro Saborío
FW	7	Pablo Brenes (substituted off) 63'
Substitutes
DF	17	Pablo Herrera (substituted in) 63'
FW	21	Froylán Ledezma (substituted in) 69'
MF	8	Esteban Granados (substituted in) 76'
Manager
(Costa Rica) Rodrigo Kenton

Man of the Match
(Costa Rica) Álvaro Saborío
Assistant referees
(Honduras) Carlos Pastrana
(Honduras) Roberto Giron
Fourth official
(Panama) Roberto Moreno

=== Mexico vs Haiti ===
19 July 2009
18:00 UTC-5

Mexico	4–0	Haiti
Sabah 23' 63' dos Santos 42'; Barrera 83'	Report

Cowboys Stadium, Arlington
Attendance: 85,000
Referee: Courtney Campbell (Jamaica)

Mexico
GK	1	Guillermo Ochoa
DF	22	Efraín Juárez
DF	2	Jonny Magallón
DF	3	Ismael Rodríguez
DF	5	Fausto Pinto (substituted off) 67'
MF	6	Gerardo Torrado (c)
MF	8	Israel Castro
MF	17	Giovani dos Santos
FW	16	Carlos Esquivel (substituted off) 59'
FW	7	Alberto Medina
FW	14	Miguel Sabah (substituted off) 81'
Substitutes
MF	13	Pablo Barrera (substituted in) 59'
FW	10	Guillermo Franco (substituted in) 67'
DF	15	José Antonio Castro (substituted in) 81'
Manager
(Mexico) Javier Aguirre

**Haiti**
GK	18	Jean-Dominique Zéphirin
DF	6	Frantz Bertin
DF	3	Frantz Gilles
DF	8	Judelin Aveska
DF	13	Pierre Richard Bruny (c)
DF	15	Ednerson Raymond
MF	19	Vaniel Sirin (yellow card) 16' (substituted off) 69'
MF	12	James Marcelin
MF	14	Mones Chery (substituted off) 58'
FW	11	Fabrice Noël (substituted off) 79'
FW	9	Leonel Saint-Preux
Substitutes
MF	16	Mackorel Sampeur (substituted in) 58'
MF	7	Brunel Fucien (substituted in) 69'
FW	10	Jean-Robens Jerome (substituted in) 79'
Manager
(Colombia) Jairo Rios

Man of the Match
(Mexico) Miguel Sabah
Assistant referees
(Jamaica) Ricardo Morgan
(Jamaica) Anthony Garwood
Fourth official
(Trinidad and Tobago) Geoffey Hospedales

== Semi-finals ==
The two semi-final matchups were played as a double-header at Soldier Field in Chicago on July 23. The first match featured Honduras and hosts United States; the nightcap featured Costa Rica and Mexico.

=== Honduras vs United States ===
23 July 2009
19:00 UTC-5

Honduras	0–2	United States
	Report	Goodson 45'; Cooper 90'

Soldier Field, Chicago
Attendance: 55,173
Referee: Courtney Campbell (Jamaica)

Honduras
GK	22	Donis Escober
DF	16	Nery Medina
DF	5	Erick Norales
DF	2	Osman Chávez
DF	14	Carlos Palacios
MF	11	Mariano Acevedo
MF	15	Walter Martínez (c) (substituted off) 80'
MF	18	Melvin Valladares (substituted off) 90+1'
FW	13	Carlo Costly (yellow card) 78'
FW	9	Carlos Mejía
FW	10	Marvin Chávez (substituted off) 85'
Substitutes
MF	23	Roger Espinoza (substituted in) 80'
FW	24	Georgie Welcome (substituted in) 85'
FW	8	Allan Lalín (substituted in) 90+1'
Manager
(Colombia) Reynaldo Rueda

**United States**
GK	1	Troy Perkins
DF	4	Chad Marshall
DF	3	Clarence Goodson
DF	16	Jay Heaps
DF	2	Heath Pearce
MF	8	Logan Pause (yellow card) 38'
MF	5	Kyle Beckerman (yellow card) 47'
MF	7	Robbie Rogers (substituted off) 77'
MF	10	Stuart Holden
MF	22	Davy Arnaud (yellow card) 74' (substituted off) 86'
FW	11	Brian Ching
Substitutes
MF	20	Santino Quaranta (substituted in) 77'
FW	17	Kenny Cooper (substituted in) 86'
Manager
(United States) Bob Bradley

Man of the Match
(United States) Clarence Goodson
Assistant referees
(Jamaica) Ricardo Morgan
(Jamaica) Anthony Garwood
Fourth official
(Mexico) Marco Rodríguez

=== Costa Rica vs Mexico ===
23 July 2009
22:00 UTC-5

Costa Rica	1–1 (a.e.t.)	Mexico
Ledezma 90+3'	Report	Franco 88'
Penalties
Saborío (penalty scored); Borges (penalty scored); Ledezma (penalty missed); Oviedo (penalty scored)	3–5	(penalty scored) Franco; (penalty scored) dos Santos; (penalty scored) Torrado; (penalty scored) Juárez; (penalty scored) Vela

Soldier Field, Chicago
Attendance: 55,173
Referee: Roberto Moreno (Panama)

Costa Rica
GK	1	Keylor Navas
DF	3	Freddy Fernández (c) (yellow card) 83'
DF	20	Dennis Marshall (yellow card) 70'
DF	2	Darío Delgado (yellow card) 27'
DF	15	Harold Wallace
MF	5	Celso Borges
MF	6	Cristian Oviedo (yellow card) 95'
MF	14	Armando Alonso (substituted off) 68'
FW	11	Andy Herron (yellow card) 23' (substituted off) 90+1'
FW	9	Álvaro Saborío
FW	7	Pablo Brenes (substituted off) 59'
Substitutes
DF	17	Pablo Herrera (substituted in) 59'
FW	21	Froylán Ledezma (substituted in) 68'
MF	19	Warren Granados (substituted in) 90+1'
Manager
(Costa Rica) Rodrigo Kenton

**Mexico**
GK	1	Guillermo Ochoa
DF	2	Jonny Magallón
DF	5	Fausto Pinto (substituted off) 81'
DF	21	Juan Carlos Valenzuela
DF	22	Efraín Juárez (yellow card) 48'
MF	6	Gerardo Torrado (c) (yellow card) 20'
MF	8	Israel Castro
MF	7	Alberto Medina
MF	13	Pablo Barrera (substituted off) 54'
FW	14	Miguel Sabah (substituted off) 71'
FW	17	Giovani dos Santos
Substitutes
DF	15	José Antonio Castro (substituted in) 54'
FW	10	Guillermo Franco (substituted in) 71'
FW	11	Carlos Vela (substituted in) 81'
Manager
(Mexico) Mario Carrillo

Man of the Match
(Mexico) Guillermo Ochoa
Assistant referees
(Panama) Daniel Williamson
(El Salvador) William Torres
Fourth official
(El Salvador) Joel Aguilar

== Final ==
=== United States vs Mexico ===
26 July 2009
15:00 UTC-4

United States	0–5	Mexico
	Report	Torrado 56' (pen.); Dos Santos 62'; Vela 68'; J.A. Castro 78'; Franco 90'

Giants Stadium, East Rutherford
Attendance: 79,156
Referee: Courtney Campbell (Jamaica)

United States
GK	1	Troy Perkins
DF	4	Chad Marshall
DF	3	Clarence Goodson
DF	16	Jay Heaps (yellow card) 24' (yellow-red card) 88'
DF	2	Heath Pearce
MF	8	Logan Pause (yellow card) 27' (substituted off) 65'
MF	5	Kyle Beckerman (substituted off) 81'
MF	7	Robbie Rogers
MF	10	Stuart Holden
MF	22	Davy Arnaud (substituted off) 64'
FW	11	Brian Ching (c)
Substitutes
FW	17	Kenny Cooper (substituted in) 64' (yellow card) 90'
FW	20	Santino Quaranta (substituted in) 65'
FW	15	Sam Cronin (substituted in) 81'
Manager
(United States) Bob Bradley

**Mexico**
GK	1	Guillermo Ochoa
DF	15	José Antonio Castro (substituted off) 88'
DF	21	Juan Carlos Valenzuela
DF	2	Jonny Magallón
DF	5	Fausto Pinto
MF	6	Gerardo Torrado (c)
MF	8	Israel Castro
MF	22	Efraín Juárez
MF	17	Giovani dos Santos
FW	7	Alberto Medina (yellow card) 45' (substituted off) 46'
FW	14	Miguel Sabah (substituted off) 69'
Substitutes
FW	11	Carlos Vela (substituted in) 46'
FW	10	Guillermo Franco (substituted in) 69' (yellow card) 72'
FW	16	Carlos Esquivel (substituted in) 88'
Manager
(Mexico) Javier Aguirre

Man of the Match
(Mexico) Giovani dos Santos
Assistant referees
(Jamaica) Ricardo Morgan
(El Salvador) Willian Torres
Fourth official
(El Salvador) Joel Aguilar
