= 2009 CONCACAF Gold Cup group stage =

The 2009 CONCACAF Gold Cup group stage was played July 3–12, 2009.

== Format ==
The draw for the Group Stage was announced April 2, 2009. The twelve qualified teams were divided into three groups of four. The top two teams in each group advanced to the knockout stage along with the best two of the third-place teams, filling out the knockout field of eight.

If teams were level on points, they were ranked on the following criteria in order:

1. Greater number of points in matches between the tied teams (if applicable)
2. Greater goal difference in matches between the tied teams (if more than two teams finish equal on points)
3. Greater number of goals scored in matches among the tied teams (if more than two teams finish equal on points)
4. Greater goal difference in all group matches
5. Greater number of goals scored in all group matches
6. If teams are still tied, CONCACAF will hold a drawing of lots

== Group A ==
Team	Pld	W	D	L	GF	GA	GD	Pts
Canada	3	2	1	0	4	2	+2	7
Costa Rica	3	1	1	1	4	4	0	4
Jamaica	3	1	0	2	1	2	−1	3
El Salvador	3	1	0	2	2	3	−1	3

3 July 2009
17:00 UTC-7

Canada	1–0	Jamaica
Gerba 75'	Report

The Home Depot Center, Carson
Attendance: 27,000
Referee: Terry Vaughn (United States)
3 July 2009
19:00 UTC-7

Costa Rica	1–2	El Salvador
Granados 64'	Report	Romero 19', 87'

The Home Depot Center, Carson
Attendance: 27,000
Referee: Benito Archundia (Mexico)

7 July 2009
19:00 UTC-4

Jamaica	0–1	Costa Rica
	Report	Borges 64'

Columbus Crew Stadium, Columbus
Attendance: 7,059
Referee: Jair Marrufo (United States)
7 July 2009
21:00 UTC-4

El Salvador	0–1	Canada
	Report	Gerba 32'

Columbus Crew Stadium, Columbus
Attendance: 7,059
Referee: Roberto García (Mexico)

10 July 2009
19:00 UTC-4

Costa Rica	2–2	Canada
Herrón 23'; Centeno 35'	Report	Bernier 25'; De Jong 28'

FIU Stadium, Miami
Attendance: 17,269
Referee: Terry Vaughn (United States)
10 July 2009
21:00 UTC-4

El Salvador	0–1	Jamaica
	Report	Cummings 70'

FIU Stadium, Miami
Attendance: 17,269
Referee: Geoffrey Hospedales (Trinidad and Tobago)

== Group B ==
Team	Pld	W	D	L	GF	GA	GD	Pts
United States	3	2	1	0	8	2	+6	7
Honduras	3	2	0	1	5	2	+3	6
Haiti	3	1	1	1	4	3	+1	4
Grenada	3	0	0	3	0	10	−10	0

4 July 2009
16:00 UTC-7

Honduras	1–0	Haiti
Costly 76'	Report

Qwest Field, Seattle
Attendance: 15,387
Referee: Marco Antonio Rodríguez (Mexico)
4 July 2009
18:00 UTC-7

Grenada	0–4	United States
	Report	Adu 7'; Holden 31'; Rogers 60'; Davies 69'

Qwest Field, Seattle
Attendance: 15,387
Referee: Walter López (Guatemala)

8 July 2009
19:00 UTC-4

Haiti	2–0	Grenada
Noël 14'; Marcelin 79'	Report

Robert F. Kennedy Memorial Stadium, Washington
Attendance: 26,079
Referee: Roberto Moreno (Panama)
8 July 2009
21:00 UTC-4

United States	2–0	Honduras
Quaranta 74'; Ching 79'	Report

Robert F. Kennedy Memorial Stadium, Washington
Attendance: 26,079
Referee: Courtney Campbell (Jamaica)

11 July 2009
19:00 UTC-4

United States	2–2	Haiti
Arnaud 6'; Holden 90+2'	Report	Sirin 46'; Chéry 49'

Gillette Stadium, Foxborough
Attendance: 24,137
Referee: Wálter Quesada (Costa Rica)
11 July 2009
21:00 UTC-4

Honduras	4–0	Grenada
Martínez 2'; Espinoza 25'; Valladares 56'; Costly 67'	Report

Gillette Stadium, Foxborough
Attendance: 24,137
Referee: Marco Antonio Rodríguez (Mexico)

== Group C ==
Team	Pld	W	D	L	GF	GA	GD	Pts
Mexico	3	2	1	0	5	1	+4	7
Guadeloupe	3	2	0	1	4	3	+1	6
Panama	3	1	1	1	6	3	+3	4
Nicaragua	3	0	0	3	0	8	−8	0

5 July 2009
14:00 UTC-7

Panama	1–2	Guadeloupe
Barahona 68'	Report	Loval 33'; Fleurival 43'

Oakland–Alameda County Coliseum, Oakland
Attendance: 32,500
Referee: Neal Brizan (Trinidad and Tobago)
5 July 2009
16:00 UTC-7

Nicaragua	0–2	Mexico
	Report	Noriega 45' (pen.); Barrera 86'

Oakland–Alameda County Coliseum, Oakland
Attendance: 32,500
Referee: Paul Ward (Canada)

9 July 2009
19:00 UTC-5

Guadeloupe	2–0	Nicaragua
Auvray 57'; Gotin 59'	Report

Reliant Stadium, Houston
Attendance: 47,713
Referee: Óscar Moncada (Honduras)
9 July 2009
21:00 UTC-5

Mexico	1–1	Panama
Sabah 10'	Report	Pérez 29'

Reliant Stadium, Houston
Attendance: 47,713
Referee: Joel Aguilar (El Salvador)

12 July 2009
14:00 UTC-7

Panama	4–0	Nicaragua
Pérez 35'; Gómez 56'; Tejada 76', 88'	Report

University of Phoenix Stadium, Glendale
Attendance: 23,876
Referee: Jose Pineda (Honduras)
12 July 2009
16:00 UTC-7

Mexico	2–0	Guadeloupe
Torrado 42'; Sabah 85'	Report

University of Phoenix Stadium, Glendale
Attendance: 23,876
Referee: Neal Brizan (Trinidad and Tobago)

== Ranking of third-place teams ==
Grp	Team	Pld	W	D	L	GF	GA	GD	Pts
C	Panama	3	1	1	1	6	3	+3	4
B	Haiti	3	1	1	1	4	3	+1	4
A	Jamaica	3	1	0	2	1	2	−1	3
