= 2009 CONCACAF Gold Cup final =

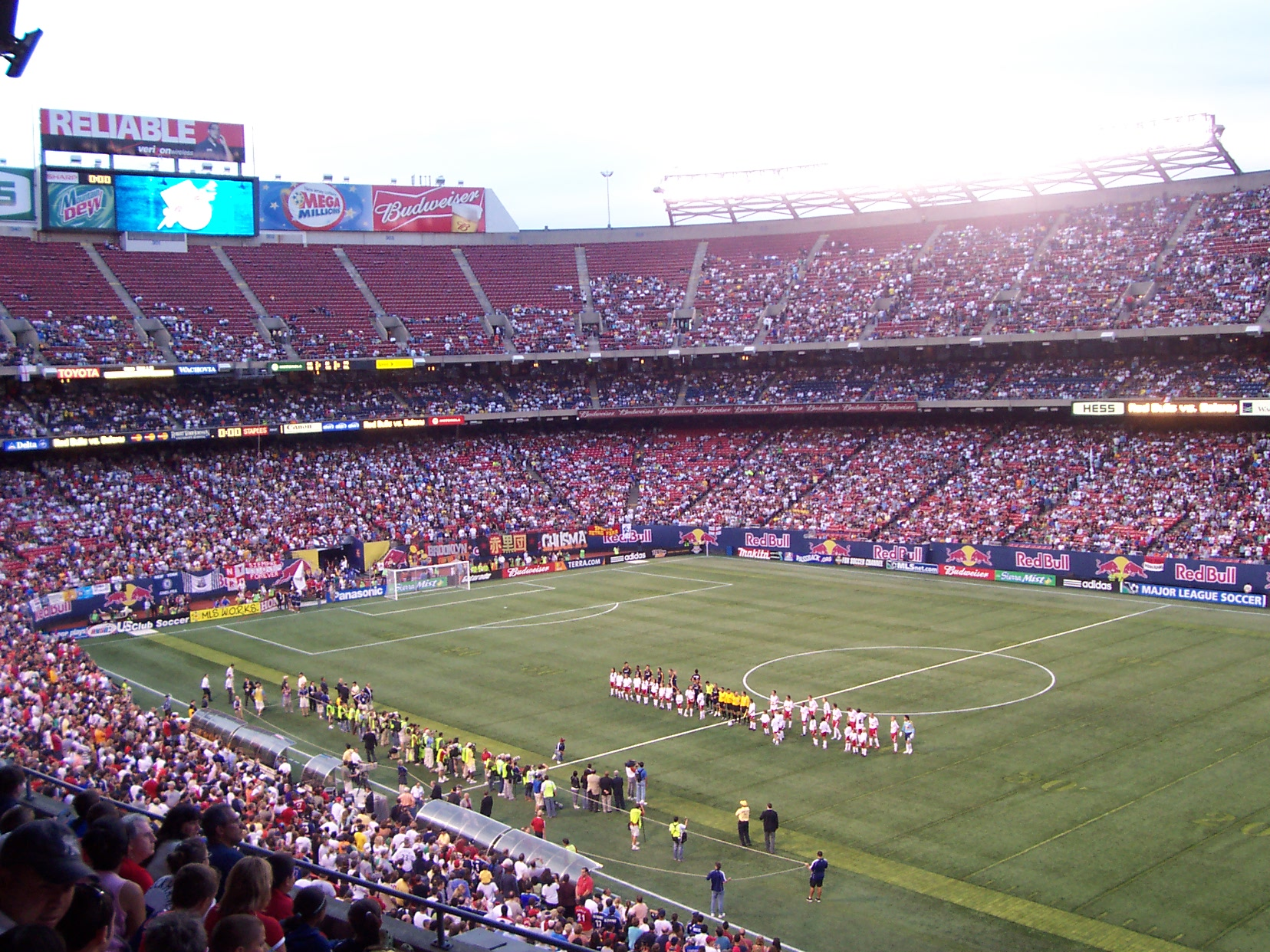
- Giants Stadium, venue
- Event: 2009 CONCACAF Gold Cup
United States	Mexico
(United States)	(Mexico)
0	5
- Date: July 26, 2009; 17 years ago
- Venue: Giants Stadium, East Rutherford
- Man of the Match: Giovani dos Santos (Mexico)
- Referee: Courtney Campbell (Jamaica)
- Attendance: 79,156

The 2009 CONCACAF Gold Cup final was a soccer match that took place on July 26, 2009, at Giants Stadium in East Rutherford, New Jersey, United States, to determine the winner of the 2009 CONCACAF Gold Cup.

Mexico won their 5th. Gold Cup (and 8th. continental title to date including the CONCACAF Championship) after thrashing United States 5–0.

== Background ==
This was the eighth CONCACAF Gold Cup final that featured the United States. They had won the title four times, most recently in 2007. Their opponent, Mexico, had won the tournament seven times, most recently in 2003. The two teams are longtime rivals and met twice before, splitting wins. The 2009 final was the last U.S. match to be played at Giants Stadium before its demolition.

== Route to the final ==
United States
Round
Mexico
Opponent
Result
Group stage
Opponent
Result
Grenada
4–0
Match 1
Nicaragua
2–0
Honduras
2–0
Match 2
Panama
1–1
Haiti
2–2
Match 3
Guatemala
2–0

Team	Pld	W	D	L	GF	GA	GD	Pts
United States	3	2	1	0	8	2	+6	7
Honduras	3	2	0	1	5	2	+3	6
Haiti	3	1	1	1	4	3	+1	4
Grenada	3	0	0	3	0	10	−10	0

Final standing

Team	Pld	W	D	L	GF	GA	GD	Pts
Mexico	3	2	1	0	5	1	+4	7
Guadeloupe	3	2	0	1	4	3	+1	6
Panama	3	1	1	1	6	3	+3	4
Nicaragua	3	0	0	3	0	8	−8	0

Opponent
Result
Knockout stage
Opponent
Result
Panama
2–1 (a.e.t.)
Quarter-finals
Haiti
4–0
Honduras
2–0
Semi-finals
Costa Rica
1–1 (a.e.t.) (5–3 p)

== Match ==
=== Details ===
26 July 2009
15:00 UTC-4

United States	0–5	Mexico
	Report	Torrado 56' (pen.); Dos Santos 62'; Vela 67'; Castro 79'; Franco 90'

Giants Stadium, East Rutherford
Attendance: 79,156
Referee: Courtney Campbell (Jamaica)

United States	Mexico

United States
GK	1	Troy Perkins
RB	4	Chad Marshall
CB	3	Clarence Goodson
CB	16	Jay Heaps (yellow card) 24' (yellow-red card) 88'
LB	2	Heath Pearce
DM	8	Logan Pause (yellow card) 27' (substituted off) 65'
RM	5	Kyle Beckerman (substituted off) 81'
CM	7	Robbie Rogers
LM	10	Stuart Holden
AM	22	Davy Arnaud (substituted off) 64'
CF	11	Brian Ching (c)
Substitutes
FW	17	Kenny Cooper (substituted on) 64' (yellow card) 90'
FW	20	Santino Quaranta (substituted on) 65'
FW	15	Sam Cronin (substituted on) 81'
Manager
Bob Bradley

Mexico
GK	1	Guillermo Ochoa
RB	15	José Antonio Castro (substituted off) 88'
CB	21	Juan Carlos Valenzuela
CB	2	Jonny Magallón
LB	5	Fausto Pinto
RM	6	Gerardo Torrado (c)
CM	8	Israel Castro
CM	22	Efraín Juárez
LM	17	Giovani dos Santos
CF	7	Alberto Medina (yellow card) 45' (substituted off) 46'
CF	14	Miguel Sabah (substituted off) 69'
Substitutes
FW	11	Carlos Vela (substituted on) 46'
FW	10	Guillermo Franco (substituted on) 69' (yellow card) 72'
FW	16	Carlos Esquivel (substituted on) 88'
Manager
Javier Aguirre

Man of the Match
(Mexico) Giovani dos Santos
Assistant referees
(Jamaica) Ricardo Morgan
(El Salvador) Willian Torres
Fourth official
(El Salvador) Joel Aguilar
