= 2009 CONCACAF Gold Cup =

10th edition of the CONCACAF Gold Cup

Copa de Oro de la CONCACAF 2009 (in Spanish)

Tournament details
- Host country: United States
- Dates: July 3–26
- Teams: 12 (from 1 confederation)
- Venues: 13 (in 13 host cities)

Final positions
- Champions: Mexico (5th title)
- Runners-up: United States

Tournament statistics
- Matches played: 25
- Goals scored: 66 (2.64 per match)
- Attendance: 860,046 (34,402 per match)
- Top scorer: (Mexico) Miguel Sabah (4 goals)
- Best player: (Mexico) Giovani dos Santos
- Best goalkeeper: (Costa Rica) Keylor Navas
- Fair play award: United States

The 2009 CONCACAF Gold Cup was the tenth edition of the CONCACAF Gold Cup competition, and the twentieth soccer championship of North America, Central America and the Caribbean (CONCACAF). It was played from July 3 to 26, 2009 in the United States. This competition was the fourth tournament without guests from other confederations. Mexico won their fifth Gold Cup, and eighth CONCACAF Championship overall, after beating the United States 5–0 in the final. It was the second consecutive Gold Cup final and fourth overall to feature Mexico and the United States and the third won by Mexico.

== Venues ==
The set of thirteen venues—the largest number ever used to stage the Gold Cup—was announced on March 9.

Carson	Seattle	Columbus	Oakland	Washington, D.C.
The Home Depot Center	Qwest Field	Columbus Crew Stadium	Oakland–Alameda County Coliseum	RFK Stadium
Capacity: 27,000	Capacity: 67,000	Capacity: 22,555	Capacity: 63,026	Capacity: 56,692
Houston	Miami	Foxborough	Glendale	
Reliant Stadium	FIU Stadium	Gillette Stadium	University of Phoenix Stadium	
Capacity: 71,500	Capacity: 18,000	Capacity: 68,756	Capacity: 63,400	
Philadelphia	Arlington	Chicago	East Rutherford	
Lincoln Financial Field	Cowboys Stadium	Soldier Field	Giants Stadium	
Capacity: 68,532	Capacity: 80,000	Capacity: 61,500	Capacity: 80,242	
Location of the host cities of the 2009 CONCACAF Gold Cup.

== Teams ==
=== Qualification ===
A total of 12 teams qualified for the tournament. Three berths were allocated to North America, five to Central America, and four to the Caribbean.

Team	Qualification	Appearances	Last appearance	Previous best performance	FIFA Ranking
North American zone
United States (TH)	Automatic	10th	2007	Champion (1991, 2002, 2005, 2007)	12
Mexico	Automatic	10th	2007	Champions (1993, 1996, 1998, 2003)	33
Canada	Automatic	9th	2007	Champions (2000)	92
Caribbean zone qualified through the 2008 Caribbean Cup
Jamaica	Winners	7th	2005	Third Place (1993)	12
Grenada	Runners-up	1st	None	Debut	88
Guadeloupe	Third Place	2nd	2007	Semifinals (2007)	N/A
Haiti	Fifth Place (Note: Cuba finished fourth at the Caribbean Championship, but withdrew from the Gold Cup due to issues related to player development and the ability to field a competitive team. Haiti and Trinidad and Tobago, 3rd place in Group I and Group J, respectively, as the two highest finishing teams in the Caribbean Championship not already qualified for the Gold Cup, were placed in a draw by the CFU to determine who would replace Cuba, and Haiti won the draw.)	4th	2007	Quarterfinals (2002)	120
Central American zone qualified through the 2009 UNCAF Nations Cup
Panama	Winners	4th	2007	Runners-up (2005)	69
Costa Rica	Runners-up	9th	2007	Runners-up (2002)	30
Honduras	Third Place	9th	2007	Runners-up (2005)	39
El Salvador	Fourth Place	6th	2007	Quarterfinals (2002, 2003)	90
Nicaragua	Fifth Place	1st	None	Debut	135

=== Squads ===
Participating teams selected a squad of 23 players (including three goalkeepers), except the United States, who were given an expanded 30-player roster due to their participation in the 2009 FIFA Confederations Cup.

== Match officials ==
- (Canada) Paul Ward
- (Costa Rica) Wálter Quesada
- (El Salvador) Joel Aguilar
- (Guatemala) Walter López
- (Honduras) José Pineda
- (Jamaica) Courtney Campbell
- (Mexico) Benito Archundia
- (Mexico) Marco Antonio Rodríguez
- (Mexico) Roberto García
- (Panama) Roberto Moreno
- (Suriname) Enrico Wijngaarde
- (Trinidad and Tobago) Geoffrey Hospedales
- (Trinidad and Tobago) Neal Brizan
- (United States) Jair Marrufo
- (United States) Terry Vaughn

== Group stage ==
The twelve teams that qualified were divided into three groups. The draw for the Group Stage was announced on April 2, 2009. The top two teams in each group advanced to the knockout stage along with the best two of the third-place teams, filling out the knockout field of eight.

=== Group A ===
Pos	Team	Pld	W	D	L	GF	GA	GD	Pts	Qualification
1	Canada	3	2	1	0	4	2	+2	7	Advance to knockout stage
2	Costa Rica	3	1	1	1	4	4	0	4	Advance to knockout stage
3	Jamaica	3	1	0	2	1	2	−1	3	
4	El Salvador	3	1	0	2	2	3	−1	3	

July 3, 2009
17:00 UTC-7

Canada	1–0	Jamaica
Gerba 75'	Report

The Home Depot Center, Carson
Attendance: 27,000
Referee: Terry Vaughn (United States)
July 3, 2009
19:00 UTC-7

Costa Rica	1–2	El Salvador
Granados 64'	Report	Romero 19', 87'

The Home Depot Center, Carson
Attendance: 27,000
Referee: Benito Archundia (Mexico)

July 7, 2009
19:00 UTC-4

Jamaica	0–1	Costa Rica
	Report	Borges 64'

Columbus Crew Stadium, Columbus
Attendance: 7,059
Referee: Jair Marrufo (United States)
July 7, 2009
21:00 UTC-4

El Salvador	0–1	Canada
	Report	Gerba 32'

Columbus Crew Stadium, Columbus
Attendance: 7,059
Referee: Roberto García (Mexico)

July 10, 2009
19:00 UTC-4

Costa Rica	2–2	Canada
Herrón 23'; Centeno 35'	Report	Bernier 25'; De Jong 28'

FIU Stadium, Miami
Attendance: 17,269
Referee: Terry Vaughn (United States)
July 10, 2009
21:00 UTC-4

El Salvador	0–1	Jamaica
	Report	Cummings 70'

FIU Stadium, Miami
Attendance: 17,269
Referee: Geoffrey Hospedales (Trinidad and Tobago)

=== Group B ===
Pos	Team	Pld	W	D	L	GF	GA	GD	Pts	Qualification
1	United States	3	2	1	0	8	2	+6	7	Advance to knockout stage
2	Honduras	3	2	0	1	5	2	+3	6	Advance to knockout stage
3	Haiti	3	1	1	1	4	3	+1	4	Advance to knockout stage
4	Grenada	3	0	0	3	0	10	−10	0	

July 4, 2009
16:00 UTC-7

Honduras	1–0	Haiti
Costly 76'	Report

Qwest Field, Seattle
Attendance: 15,387
Referee: Marco Antonio Rodríguez (Mexico)
July 4, 2009
18:00 UTC-7

Grenada	0–4	United States
	Report	Adu 7'; Holden 31'; Rogers 60'; Davies 69'

Qwest Field, Seattle
Attendance: 15,387
Referee: Walter López (Guatemala)

July 8, 2009
19:00 UTC-4

Haiti	2–0	Grenada
Noël 14'; Marcelin 79'	Report

RFK Stadium, Washington, D.C.
Attendance: 26,079
Referee: Roberto Moreno (Panama)
July 8, 2009
21:00 UTC-4

United States	2–0	Honduras
Quaranta 74'; Ching 79'	Report

RFK Stadium, Washington, D.C.
Attendance: 26,079
Referee: Courtney Campbell (Jamaica)

July 11, 2009
19:00 UTC-4

United States	2–2	Haiti
Arnaud 6'; Holden 90+2'	Report	Sirin 46'; Chéry 49'

Gillette Stadium, Foxborough
Attendance: 24,137
Referee: Wálter Quesada (Costa Rica)
July 11, 2009
21:00 UTC-4

Honduras	4–0	Grenada
Martínez 2'; Espinoza 25'; Valladares 56'; Costly 67'	Report

Gillette Stadium, Foxborough
Attendance: 24,137
Referee: Marco Antonio Rodríguez (Mexico)

=== Group C ===
Pos	Team	Pld	W	D	L	GF	GA	GD	Pts	Qualification
1	Mexico	3	2	1	0	5	1	+4	7	Advance to knockout stage
2	Guadeloupe	3	2	0	1	4	3	+1	6	Advance to knockout stage
3	Panama	3	1	1	1	6	3	+3	4	Advance to knockout stage
4	Nicaragua	3	0	0	3	0	8	−8	0	

July 5, 2009
14:00 UTC-7

Panama	1–2	Guadeloupe
Barahona 68'	Report	Loval 33'; Fleurival 43'

Oakland–Alameda County Coliseum, Oakland
Attendance: 32,500
Referee: Neal Brizan (Trinidad and Tobago)
July 5, 2009
16:00 UTC-7

Nicaragua	0–2	Mexico
	Report	Noriega 45' (pen.); Barrera 86'

Oakland–Alameda County Coliseum, Oakland
Attendance: 32,500
Referee: Paul Ward (Canada)

July 9, 2009
19:00 UTC-5

Guadeloupe	2–0	Nicaragua
Auvray 57'; Gotin 59'	Report

Reliant Stadium, Houston
Attendance: 47,713
Referee: Óscar Moncada (Honduras)
July 9, 2009
21:00 UTC-5

Mexico	1–1	Panama
Sabah 10'	Report	Pérez 29'

Reliant Stadium, Houston
Attendance: 47,713
Referee: Joel Aguilar (El Salvador)

July 12, 2009
14:00 UTC-7

Panama	4–0	Nicaragua
Pérez 35'; Gómez 56'; Tejada 76', 88'	Report

University of Phoenix Stadium, Glendale
Attendance: 23,876
Referee: Jose Pineda (Honduras)
July 12, 2009
16:00 UTC-7

Mexico	2–0	Guadeloupe
Torrado 42'; Sabah 85'	Report

University of Phoenix Stadium, Glendale
Attendance: 23,876
Referee: Neal Brizan (Trinidad and Tobago)

=== Ranking of third-placed teams ===
Pos	Grp	Team	Pld	W	D	L	GF	GA	GD	Pts	Qualification
1	C	Panama	3	1	1	1	6	3	+3	4	Advance to knockout stage
2	B	Haiti	3	1	1	1	4	3	+1	4	Advance to knockout stage
3	A	Jamaica	3	1	0	2	1	2	−1	3	

== Knockout stage ==
=== Bracket ===
Quarter-finals
18 July – Philadelphia
Canada	0
Honduras	1
18 July – Philadelphia
United States (a.e.t.)	2
Panama	1
19 July – Arlington
Guadeloupe	1
Costa Rica	5
19 July – Arlington
Mexico	4
Haiti	0

Semi-finals
23 July – Chicago
Honduras	0
United States	2
23 July – Chicago
Costa Rica	1 (3)
Mexico (p)	1 (5)

Final
26 July – East Rutherford
United States	0
Mexico	5

=== Quarter-finals ===
July 18, 2009
17:00 UTC-4

Canada	0–1	Honduras
	Report	Martínez 36' (pen.)

Lincoln Financial Field, Philadelphia
Attendance: 32,000
Referee: Joel Aguilar (El Salvador)

July 18, 2009
20:00 UTC-4

United States	2–1 (a.e.t.)	Panama
Beckerman 49'; Cooper 106' (pen.)	Report	Pérez 45'

Lincoln Financial Field, Philadelphia
Attendance: 32,000
Referee: Benito Archundia (Mexico)

July 19, 2009
15:00 UTC-5

Guadeloupe	1–5	Costa Rica
Alphonse 64'	Report	Borges 3'; Saborío 16', 71'; Herron 47'; Herrera 89'

Cowboys Stadium, Arlington
Attendance: 85,000
Referee: Jose Pineda (Honduras)

July 19, 2009
18:00 UTC-5

Mexico	4–0	Haiti
Sabah 23', 63'; Dos Santos 42'; Barrera 83'	Report

Cowboys Stadium, Arlington
Attendance: 85,000
Referee: Courtney Campbell (Jamaica)

=== Semi-finals ===
July 23, 2009
18:00 UTC-5

Honduras	0–2	United States
	Report	Goodson 45'; Cooper 90'

Soldier Field, Chicago
Attendance: 55,173
Referee: Courtney Campbell (Jamaica)

July 23, 2009
21:00 UTC-5

Costa Rica	1–1 (a.e.t.)	Mexico
Ledezma 90+3'	Report	Franco 88'
Penalties
Saborío (penalty scored); Borges (penalty scored); Ledezma (penalty missed); Oviedo (penalty scored)	3–5	(penalty scored) Franco; (penalty scored) Dos Santos; (penalty scored) Torrado; (penalty scored) Juárez; (penalty scored) Vela

Soldier Field, Chicago
Attendance: 55,173
Referee: Roberto Moreno (Panama)

=== Final ===
26 July 2009
15:00

United States	0–5	Mexico
	Report	Torrado 56' (pen.); Dos Santos 62'; Vela 67'; Castro 79'; Franco 90'

Giants Stadium, East Rutherford
Attendance: 79,156
Referee: Courtney Campbell (Jamaica)

== Statistics ==
=== Goalscorers ===
There were 66 goals scored in 25 matches, for an average of 2.64 goals per match.

4 goals

- (Mexico) Miguel Sabah

3 goals

- (Panama) Blas Pérez

2 goals

- (Canada) Ali Gerba
- (Costa Rica) Celso Borges
- (Costa Rica) Andy Herron
- (Costa Rica) Álvaro Saborío
- (El Salvador) Osael Romero
- (Honduras) Carlo Costly
- (Honduras) Walter Martínez
- (Mexico) Gerardo Torrado
- (Mexico) Giovani dos Santos
- (Mexico) Pablo Barrera
- (Mexico) Guillermo Franco
- (Panama) Luis Tejada
- (United States) Kenny Cooper
- (United States) Stuart Holden

1 goal

- (Canada) Patrice Bernier
- (Canada) Marcel de Jong
- (Costa Rica) Walter Centeno
- (Costa Rica) Warren Granados
- (Costa Rica) Pablo Herrera
- (Costa Rica) Froylán Ledezma
- (Guadeloupe) Alexandre Alphonse
- (Guadeloupe) Stéphane Auvray
- (Guadeloupe) David Fleurival
- (Guadeloupe) Ludovic Gotin
- (Guadeloupe) Loïc Loval
- (Haiti) Monès Chéry
- (Haiti) James Marcelin
- (Haiti) Fabrice Noël
- (Haiti) Vaniel Sirin
- (Honduras) Roger Espinoza
- (Honduras) Melvin Valladares
- (Jamaica) Omar Cummings
- (Mexico) José Antonio Castro
- (Mexico) Luis Miguel Noriega
- (Mexico) Carlos Vela
- (Panama) Nelson Barahona
- (Panama) Gabriel Enrique Gómez
- (United States) Freddy Adu
- (United States) Davy Arnaud
- (United States) Kyle Beckerman
- (United States) Brian Ching
- (United States) Charlie Davies
- (United States) Clarence Goodson
- (United States) Santino Quaranta
- (United States) Robbie Rogers

== Awards ==
The following Gold Cup awards will be given at the conclusion of the tournament: the Golden Boot (top scorer), Golden Ball (best overall player) and Golden Glove (best goalkeeper).''

Golden Ball
(Mexico) Giovani dos Santos
Golden Boot
(Mexico) Miguel Sabah
4 goals
Golden Glove
(Costa Rica) Keylor Navas
Fair Play Trophy
United States

All-Tournament team

The All-Tournament Team was selected by the CONCACAF Technical Study Group. The player selections were made from the eight teams that reached the quarterfinals of the 2009 CONCACAF Gold Cup.

Goalkeepers	Defenders	Midfielders	Forwards
(Costa Rica) Keylor Navas (Mexico) Guillermo Ochoa	(Canada) Mike Klukowski (Costa Rica) Freddy Fernández (Mexico) Fausto Pinto (Panama) Luis Moreno (United States) Clarence Goodson (United States) Chad Marshall	(Canada) Julian de Guzman (Costa Rica) Celso Borges (Guadeloupe) Stéphane Auvray (Mexico) Gerardo Torrado (Mexico) Giovani dos Santos (United States) Stuart Holden	(Costa Rica) Álvaro Saborío (Honduras) Walter Martínez (Mexico) Miguel Sabah (United States) Kenny Cooper

== Marketing ==
=== Broadcasting rights ===
In Australia, the tournament was broadcast by Setanta Sports

In Brazil, the tournament was broadcast by Multisports

In Canada, the tournament was broadcast by Rogers Sportsnet and GolTV Canada

In Costa Rica, the tournament was broadcast by Teletica Canal 7, XPERTV 33 and Repretel

In Mexico and Central America, the tournament was broadcast by Televisa and TV Azteca (Mexico and United States Matches) and SKY México

In Honduras, Televicentro was broadcasting in three of their channels, MegaTV, Tele Sistema, Canal 7y4.

In Panama, the tournament was broadcast by RPC TV Canal 4 and TV Max.

In Malaysia, the tournament was broadcast by Astro Supersports.

In the United States, English language coverage of games involving the US, as well as one game from each round of the knockout stages even if the USA was not involved, was on Fox Soccer Channel. All tournament games received Spanish language coverage split between Galavision, TeleFutura, Univision.

Worldwide, except in the Americas, the tournament was streamed by Omnisport.TV the legal online rights holder working in partnership with CONCACAF, with English commentary and in HDTV quality.
