= Froylán Ledezma =

Costa Rican footballer (born 1978)

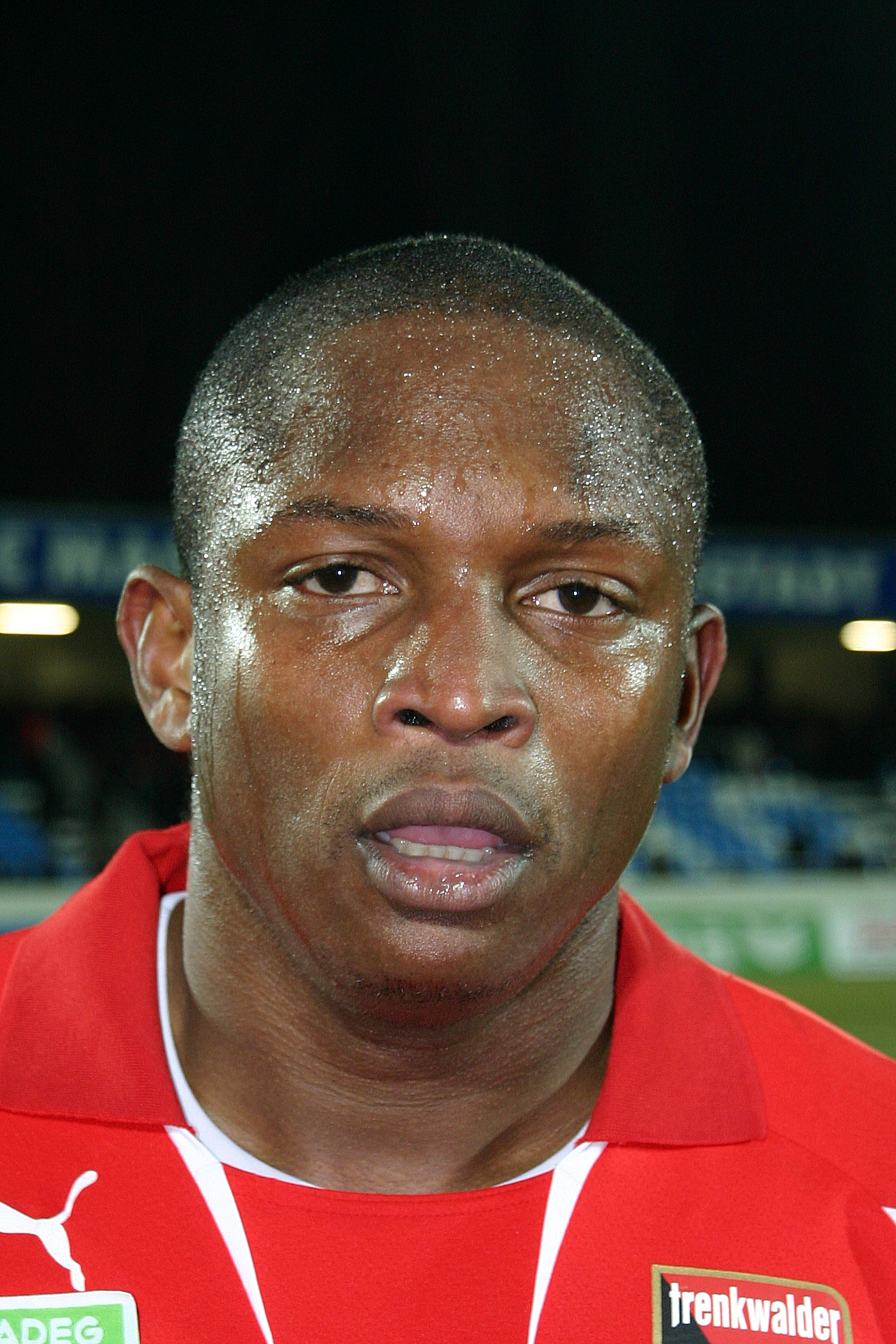
- Froylan Ledezma in 2009

Personal information
- Full name: Froylán Greing Ledezma Stephens
- Date of birth: 2 January 1978 (age 48)
- Place of birth: San José, Costa Rica
- Height: 1.81 m (5 ft 11 1/2 in)
- Position: Forward

Senior career*
Years	Team	Apps	(Gls)
1995–1997	Alajuelense	70	(35)
1997–2001	Ajax	0	(0)
2001–2002	Cerro Porteño	1	(0)
2002–2003	Saprissa	14	(9)
2003	The Strongest	13	(8)
2004–2006	Alajuelense	41	(9)
2006	→ Akratitos (loan)	13	(3)
2006–2007	Rheindorf Altach	24	(5)
2007–2008	FC Augsburg	18	(3)
2008–2010	Admira Wacker	24	(9)
2010	→ Herediano (loan)	13	(6)
2011	Admira Wacker	13	(4)
2012	Alajuelense	4	(1)

International career
1997	Costa Rica U20		
1997–2009	Costa Rica	22	(6)
- * Club domestic league appearances and goals

Froylán Greing Ledezma Stephens (born 2 January 1978) is a retired Costa Rican international football forward.

He is nicknamed as El Cachorro which means "The Puppy".

== Club career ==
A strong, quick and explosive striker, he debuted in the Costa Rican league on 14 January 1995 at the age of 17 with Alajuelense against Municipal Pérez Zeledón. In the 1995–96 season, he scored 14 goals and played 41 games, and followed up the next season with 21 goals in 27 matches.

=== Ajax ===
He was scouted by Dutch club Ajax and after that, invited for a trial by their big rivals Feyenoord. But Ajax signed him in 1997 for around 4.5 million euros in spectacular fashion after 'kidnapping' him from Amsterdam Airport under Feyenoord's nose. However, the promising youngster was not a success in Dutch football, only playing twice for Ajax. He was suspended by Ajax for indiscipline after his first season until his contract ended (almost three years later).

=== South America ===
In 2001, he signed for Cerro Porteño but was not eligible to play immediately since Ajax had not formally released him. In February 2002, overweight and lacking match fitness, Ledezma broke his foot in a warm-up match in Chile. In May 2002, he was taken in custody after an altercation with traffic police outside a bar where he had illegally parked his car.

Ledezma returned to Costa Rica where he surprisingly signed for Saprissa (Alajuelense's archrival). He then joined Bolivian side, The Strongest, regularly appearing in the starting line-up, and playing in the Copa Libertadores. He was only the third Costa Rican to score in the Libertadores after netting in February 2003 against Uruguayan side Fénix.

=== Alajuelense ===
Afterwards he returned to Alajuelense amid more controversy when The Strongest claimed Ledezma owed them money for his rights after he walked out on the club. At Alajuelense he became CONCACAF Champions' Cup's champion in 2004 and led the team to their league championship in the 2004–05 season. He started the 2005–06 season with Alajuelense but was suspended by the Costa Rican FA for three months in June 2005 for leaving the national team set-up without permission. He then was loaned to Greek team Akratitos for six months (January – June 2006), then he was bought by Austrian club Rheindorf Altach. He had an acceptable campaign and by the end of the season he was sold again to FC Augsburg.

=== Admira Wacker ===
On a quick transaction he was transferred to Admira Wacker. More controversy ensued, however, as he was sent back to the reserve team in October 2009 claiming the club owed him 3 months wages.

In 2009, after Costa Rica's national team's poor performance under Hernán Medford's direction, a new head coach, Rodrigo Kenton, was hired and he called Ledezma back to the national team where he performed well.

Ledezma was released from Admira Wacker and joined Costa Rican club Herediano in June 2010, only to leave them after just five months as he rejoined Admira Wacker. He started playing well in Austrian second division, his club winning promotion to the 1st league. He played just a few games as substitute in the 2011 season, but then suffered a shoulder injury, which sidelined him for four months.

=== Final season ===
After he recovered from the injury, he decided to end his contract with Admira Wacker and to move back to Costa Rica to play with Alajuelense. He announced his retirement in August 2012, after failing to regain full fitness.

== International career ==
Ledezma played for Costa Rica in the 1997 FIFA World Youth Championship held in Malaysia.

He made his senior debut for Costa Rica in a September 1997 FIFA World Cup qualification match against Jamaica and earned a total of 22 caps, scoring 6 goals. He helped his country win the UNCAF Nations Cup 1999 and has also appeared in three qualifying matches for the 2006 FIFA World Cup and 6 qualifying matches for the 2010 FIFA World Cup. He also played at the 2009 CONCACAF Gold Cup.

His final international was a September 2009 FIFA World Cup qualification match against El Salvador.

== Retirement ==
Ledezma retired after the 2012 summer tournament. In January 2014, he was injured in a car accident near Orotina.

== Honours ==
- Primera División de Costa Rica:
  - 1995–96, 1996–97, 2004–05
- Copa Interclubes UNCAF:
  - 1996, 2005
- UNCAF Nations Cup:
  - 1999
- Liga de Fútbol Profesional Boliviano:
  - 2003-C
- CONCACAF Champions' Cup:
  - 2004

== Career statistics ==
=== International goals ===
Scores and results list. Costa Rica's goal tally first.

#	Date	Venue	Opponent	Score	Result	Competition
1.	17 March 1999	Estadio Nacional, San José, Costa Rica	Belize	3–0	7–0	1999 UNCAF Nations Cup
2.	17 March 1999	Estadio Nacional, San José, Costa Rica	Belize	4–0	7–0	1999 UNCAF Nations Cup
3.	4 June 2004	Estadio Carlos Ugalde Álvarez, San Carlos, Costa Rica	Nicaragua	2–1	5–1	Friendly
4.	6 September 2008	Estadio Ricardo Saprissa, San José, Costa Rica	Suriname	1–0	7–0	2010 FIFA World Cup qualification
5.	6 September 2008	Estadio Ricardo Saprissa, San José, Costa Rica	Suriname	2–0	7–0	2010 FIFA World Cup qualification
6.	23 July 2009	Soldier Field, Chicago, United States	Mexico	1–1	1–1	2009 CONCACAF Gold Cup
