= Blas Pérez =

Panamanian footballer (born 1981)

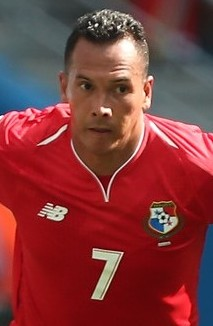
- Pérez with Panama at the 2018 FIFA World Cup

Personal information
- Full name: Blas Antonio Pérez Ortega
- Date of birth: 13 March 1981 (age 45)
- Place of birth: Panama City, Panama
- Height: 1.87 m (6 ft 2 in)
- Position: Forward

Team information
- Current team: Dallas Sidekicks
- Number: 7

Senior career*
Years	Team	Apps	(Gls)
1998–2000	Panamá Viejo	56	(37)
2001–2002	Árabe Unido	36	(10)
2002	Nacional	2	(0)
2003	Envigado	29	(6)
2004	Centauros	37	(29)
2005–2006	Deportivo Cali	54	(20)
2006–2007	Cúcuta Deportivo	33	(15)
2007–2008	Hércules	16	(4)
2008–2012	UANL	31	(8)
2009	→ Pachuca (loan)	19	(7)
2009	→ Al Wasl (loan)	8	(4)
2010	→ San Luis (loan)	16	(5)
2010–2011	→ León (loan)	30	(19)
2011	→ Indios (loan)	12	(3)
2012–2015	FC Dallas	103	(37)
2016	Vancouver Whitecaps	22	(6)
2017	Árabe Unido	2	(2)
2017	Blooming	10	(4)
2017-2018	Municipal	39	(15)
2018	Árabe Unido	9	(0)
2022–	Dallas Sidekicks (indoor)	31	(24)
Total		556	(232)

International career
2001–2018	Panama	123	(43)
- * Club domestic league appearances and goals as of 27 November 2024

Blas Antonio Pérez Ortega (born 13 March 1981) is a Panamanian former professional footballer who plays as a forward for the Dallas Sidekicks in the Major Arena Soccer League.

== Club career ==
Pérez began his career in his native Panama with Panamá Viejo. He made his debut with the club in 1998 and went on to score 27 goals in 56 matches. In 2001, he joined Árabe Unido and continued his goal scoring form. In 2002, he joined top Uruguayan side Nacional. The following season, he left for Colombia signing with Envigado, scoring a goal on his debut against Independiente Medellin in the process. After one season at the club he joined Centauros and went on to score 29 goals in 37 matches, catching the attention of one of Colombia's top clubs Deportivo Cali. For the 2005 season he signed with Cali and remained at the club for two years in which he continued with his goal scoring form. In 2006 Perez joined Cúcuta. With Cúcuta, Perez won the Copa Mustang in 2006 against Deportes Tolima. In 2007 Cúcuta and Blas Perez made their debut in Copa Libertadores, in which Blas scored eight goals, including two against Argentina's Boca Juniors. The eight goals were the second-most in the tournament.

On 29 May 2007, Spanish Segunda División team Hércules CF signed Super Ratón on a four-year contract in which they acquired 50% of the players rights. It was valued at US$2.7 million, with Blas Perez earning 60 thousand dollars per month. Perez enjoyed a brief stay in Spain in which he scored four goals in 16 matches.

On 18 January 2008, he signed with UANL Tigres, his seventh club in his career and first in Mexico. He played for Pachuca for the 2009 Clausura in a loan deal after Miguel Sabah's transfer to Pachuca did not work out. He scored eight goals in 15 matches with Pachuca.

After his impressive display in the 2009 CONCACAF Gold Cup, Al Wasl FC of Dubai was able to secure Blas Pérez services to play in the UAE League based on Al Wasl's new coach Alexandre Guimarães recommendation. He stayed there only for the first half of the 2009–10 season before moving back to Mexico to play for San Luis. After having played 17 games in the Torneo Bicentenario and 2 in the 2010 edition of the Copa Libertadores and having scored 5 goals in both tournaments, he was released at the end of the season. He was later signed by Club León from the Liga de Ascenso in the 2010 edition of the Mexican draft. he rediscovered his goal scoring form with Club León with 19 goals in 28 matches. For the second half of the 2011 season he was again sent on loan this time to Indios. For the 2012 Major League Soccer season, he signed with FC Dallas. On 2 December 2015, it was announced that FC Dallas would not be renewing Perez's contract.

On 16 February 2016, Perez was traded to Vancouver Whitecaps FC for Mauro Rosales. At the conclusion of the 2016 season Perez's contract was not renewed. On 31 January 2017, Pérez signed with Panamanian club, C.D. Árabe Unido.

On 25 November 2018, Pérez retired from playing professional football.

He came out of retirement in 2022, however, to play arena soccer with the Dallas Sidekicks of the Major Arena Soccer League. Perez was nominated for the league's Newcomer of the Year honor. In June 2024, it was announced that Pérez had re-signed for the 2024–25 season.

== International career ==
Pérez made his debut for Panama in a March 2001 friendly match against El Salvador and, up until his international retirement in 2018, earned a total of 123 caps, scoring 42 goals. He is Panama's fifth all-time record cap holder and second all-time leading goalscorer after Luis Tejada. He represented his country in 35 FIFA World Cup qualification matches and played for Panama at the 2007 CONCACAF Gold Cup, in which they were eliminated in the quarter-finals by the United States. He ended up as Panama's top scorer, with three goals and one assist. Pérez was also named in the tournament's "Best XI". He also played in the 2009, 2011, 2013 and 2015 editions of the Gold Cup, as well as the Copa América Centenario.

In May 2018, Pérez was named in Panama's preliminary 35-man squad for the 2018 FIFA World Cup in Russia, eventually being named to the final 23-man selection.

== Assault attempt ==
On 23 July 2009, two cars chased Pérez's Nissan 350Z early at the morning while he was travelling along the La Chorrera highway. The assaulting cars intercepted him when one of them collided with it forcing it to stop. Pérez managed to escape from the attackers and sustained no injuries but his car was heavily damaged.

== Personal life ==
Pérez holds a U.S. green card which qualifies him as a domestic player for MLS roster purposes.

== Career statistics ==
Scores and results list Panama's goal tally first, score column indicates score after each Pérez goal.

List of international goals scored by Blas Pérez
No.	Date	Venue	Opponent	Score	Result	Competition
1	24 April 2001	Estadio Rommel Fernández, Panama City, Panama	Haiti	1–0	2–0	Friendly
2	6 September 2006	Estadio Mateo Flores, Guatemala City, Guatemala	Guatemala	2–0	2–1	Friendly
3	8 June 2007	Giants Stadium, East Rutherford, United States	Honduras	2–1	3–2	2007 CONCACAF Gold Cup
4	10 June 2007	Giants Stadium, East Rutherford, United States	Cuba	2–1	2–2	2007 CONCACAF Gold Cup
5	16 June 2007	Gillette Stadium, Foxborough, United States	United States	1–2	1–2	2007 CONCACAF Gold Cup
6	31 March 2009	Estadio Agustín Sánchez, La Chorrera, Panama	Haiti	2–0	4–0	Friendly
7	31 March 2009	Estadio Agustín Sánchez, La Chorrera, Panama	Haiti	3–0	4–0	Friendly
8	31 March 2009	Estadio Agustín Sánchez, La Chorrera, Panama	Haiti	4–0	4–0	Friendly
9	7 June 2009	National Stadium, Kingston, Jamaica	Jamaica	1–0	2–3	Friendly
10	9 July 2009	Reliant Stadium, Houston, United States	Mexico	1–1	1–1	2009 CONCACAF Gold Cup
11	12 July 2009	University of Phoenix Stadium, Glendale, United States	Nicaragua	1–0	4–0	2009 CONCACAF Gold Cup
12	18 July 2009	Lincoln Financial Field, Philadelphia, United States	United States	1–0	1–2	2009 CONCACAF Gold Cup
13	3 March 2010	Estadio José Pachencho Romero, Maracaibo, Venezuela	Venezuela	2–0	2–1	Friendly
14	11 August 2010	Estadio Rommel Fernández, Panama City, Panama	Venezuela	2–1	3–1	Friendly
15	8 October 2010	Estadio Rommel Fernández, Panama City, Panama	El Salvador	1–0	1–0	Friendly
16	21 January 2011	Estadio Rommel Fernández, Panama City, Panama	Costa Rica	1–1	1–1	2011 Copa Centroamericana
17	7 June 2011	Ford Field, Detroit, United States	Guadeloupe	1–0	3–2	2011 CONCACAF Gold Cup
18	6 September 2011	Estadio Nacional de Fútbol, Managua, Nicaragua	Nicaragua	2–1	2–1	2014 FIFA World Cup qualification
19	7 October 2011	Windsor Park, Roseau, Dominica	Dominica	3–0	5–0	2014 FIFA World Cup qualification
20	11 October 2011	Estadio Rommel Fernández, Panama City, Panama	Nicaragua	1–0	5–1	2014 FIFA World Cup qualification
21	11 October 2011	Estadio Rommel Fernández, Panama City, Panama	Nicaragua	2–0	5–1	2014 FIFA World Cup qualification
22	11 October 2011	Estadio Rommel Fernández, Panama City, Panama	Nicaragua	5–0	5–1	2014 FIFA World Cup qualification
23	11 November 2011	Estadio Rommel Fernández, Panama City, Panama	Costa Rica	1–0	2–0	Friendly
24	15 November 2011	Estadio Rommel Fernández, Panama City, Panama	Dominica	3–0	3–0	2014 FIFA World Cup qualification
25	1 June 2012	Estadio Rommel Fernández, Panama City, Panama	Jamaica	1–0	2–1	Friendly
26	8 June 2012	Estadio Olímpico Metropolitano, San Pedro Sula, Honduras	Honduras	1–0	2–0	2014 FIFA World Cup qualification
27	8 June 2012	Estadio Olímpico Metropolitano, San Pedro Sula, Honduras	Honduras	2–0	2–0	2014 FIFA World Cup qualification
28	11 September 2012	Estadio Rommel Fernández, Panama City, Panama	Canada	2–0	2–0	2014 FIFA World Cup qualification
29	13 January 2013	Estadio Rommel Fernández, Panama City, Panama	Guatemala	2–0	2–0	Friendly
30	25 January 2013	Estadio Nacional de Costa Rica, San José, Costa Rica	Guatemala	1–0	3–1	2013 Copa Centroamericana
31	26 March 2013	Estadio Rommel Fernández, Panama City, Panama	Honduras	2–0	2–0	2014 FIFA World Cup qualification
32	20 July 2013	Georgia Dome, Atlanta, United States	Cuba	4–1	6–1	2013 CONCACAF Gold Cup
33	20 July 2013	Georgia Dome, Atlanta, United States	Cuba	6–1	6–1	2013 CONCACAF Gold Cup
34	24 July 2013	Cowboys Stadium, Arlington, United States	Mexico	1–0	2–1	2013 CONCACAF Gold Cup
35	7 September 2014	Cotton Bowl, Dallas, United States	Costa Rica	1–0	2–2	2014 Copa Centroamericana
36	10 September 2014	BBVA Compass Stadium, Houston, United States	Nicaragua	1–0	2–0	2014 Copa Centroamericana
37	31 March 2015	Estadio Rommel Fernández, Panama City, Panama	Costa Rica	1–0	2–1	Friendly
38	13 July 2015	Sporting Park, Kansas City, United States	United States	1–0	1–1	2015 CONCACAF Gold Cup
39	8 January 2016	Estadio Rommel Fernández, Panama City, Panama	Cuba	4–0	4–0	Copa América Centenario qualification
40	6 June 2016	Camping World Stadium, Orlando, United States	Bolivia	1–0	2–1	Copa América Centenario
41	6 June 2016	Camping World Stadium, Orlando, United States	Bolivia	2–1	2–1	Copa América Centenario
42	13 June 2017	Estadio Rommel Fernández, Panama City, Panama	Honduras	1–1	2–2	2018 FIFA World Cup qualification

== Honours ==
Deportivo Cali

- Categoría Primera A: 2005

Cúcuta Deportivo

- Categoría Primera A: 2006

Panama

- CONCACAF Gold Cup runner-up: 2013; third place: 2015

Individual

- CONCACAF Gold Cup All-Star Team: 2007

== See also ==
- List of men's footballers with 100 or more international caps
