= Cristian Oviedo (Costa Rican footballer) =

Costa Rican footballer (born 1978)

Personal information
- Full name: Cristian Alberto Oviedo Calvo
- Date of birth: 25 August 1978 (age 48)
- Place of birth: Alajuela, Costa Rica
- Height: 1.76 m (5 ft 9 in)
- Position: Defensive midfielder

Youth career
- 1995–1997: Alajuelense

Senior career*
Years	Team	Apps	(Gls)
1997–2000	Carmelita		
2000–2002	Herediano		
2002–2003	Santos de Guápiles		
2003–2005	Herediano		
2006–2014	Alajuelense	269	(30)
Total		495	(41)

International career^{‡}
2009	Costa Rica	11	(0)
- * Club domestic league appearances and goals as of September 23, 2010 ‡ National team caps and goals as of September 23, 2010

Cristian Alberto Oviedo Calvo (born 25 August 1978) is a retired Costa Rican football player.

== Club career ==
He usually played as a defensive midfielder, but also an attacking midfielder due his passing skills and vision.

He made his debut in the Primera División on December 3, 1997 playing for Carmelita against Alajuelense. Oviedo scored the winning penalty kick in the 2010 Invierno final, helping Alajuela win its 26th league championship.

He retired on 26 July 2014 after 17 years in the Premier Division, totalling 495 league matches and 41 goals.

== International career ==
Oviedo made his debut for Costa Rica in a January 2009 UNCAF Nations Cup match against Panama and earned a total of 11 caps, scoring no goals. He represented his country in 3 FIFA World Cup qualification matches and played at the 2009 UNCAF Nations Cup as well as at the 2009 CONCACAF Gold Cup. He also was a non-playing squad member at the 2004 Copa América.

His final international was a September 2009 FIFA World Cup qualification match against El Salvador.
