= José Antonio Castro =

Mexican footballer (born 1980)

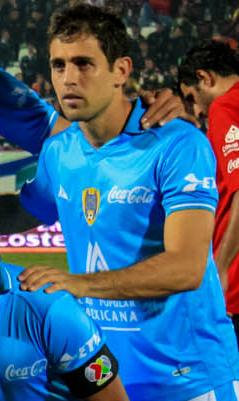
- Castro playing for San Luis

Personal information
- Full name: José Antonio Castro González
- Date of birth: 11 August 1980 (age 46)
- Place of birth: Mexico City, Mexico
- Height: 1.72 m (5 ft 8 in)
- Position: Right-back

Team information
- Current team: Atenas (Manager)

Senior career*
Years	Team	Apps	(Gls)
1999–2001	Halcones de Querétaro	47	(3)
2001–2011	América	224	(3)
2009–2010	→ Tigres UANL (loan)	47	(2)
2011–2012	Necaxa	23	(0)
2012	Tecos	11	(0)
2012	San Luis	12	(0)
2013	Atlante	4	(0)
2014	Atlético San Luis	0	(0)
Total		368	(8)

International career
2003–2010	Mexico	35	(1)

Managerial career
- 2018–2020: Cruz Azul Reserves and Academy
- 2020–2021: Querétaro (Assistant)
- 2022: UAT (Assistant)
- 2023–2025: Mexico U15
- 2025–: Atenas
Medal record
Representing Mexico
Winner	CONCACAF Gold Cup	2009
Runner-up	CONCACAF Gold Cup	2007
Third place	Copa América	2007
- * Club domestic league appearances and goals

José Antonio Castro González (Note: In this Spanish name, the first or paternal surname is Castro and the second or maternal family name is González.) (born 11 August 1980) is a Mexican former professional footballer and current manager of the Mexico national under-15 team. He gained notoriety for his performances with Club América and at the 2006 FIFA World Cup for Mexico. He is often referred to by his nickname "El Gringo".

== Club career ==
Known for his speed and solid defensive work rate, Castro was a good marker and counter-attacker who was trained in the Club América youth system. He made his debut in the Mexican Championship against Leon in the 2000–2001 season. After receiving little playing time in his first two seasons with the senior team, Castro became a vital player for the club in the Verano 2002 season, displaying fine form which helped Club América win the Mexican league championships in 2002 and the Clausura title in 2005. The talented wingback was a key player and is one of the two players (the other being Guillermo Ochoa) to have started every game of the 2004–2005 season. For the Clausura 2008, El Gringo had the responsibility of being the vice-captain of Las Águilas since Duilio Davino left the club and Germán Villa was given the job of being the team's captain. After a poor season with Club América, El Gringo was put on the transfer list. On December 5, 2008, Castro was loaned to Tigres UANL for an undisclosed fee.

== International career ==
Castro made his international debut for the Mexico national team in Los Angeles in a friendly match against Argentina on February 4, 2003. Ricardo La Volpe played him as a right winger as usual, but as a midfielder instead of defender. He played his first World Cup match against Portugal in Germany, a game which the Mexicans lost 2–1. Despite the team losing the match, Castro helped his country reach the Round of 16 where they played against Argentina. Since then, he has been called up to play friendly matches. He was even called up to play the 2007 editions of the Gold Cup and Copa América for Mexico. Recently, he was called up by Mexico coach Javier Aguirre for the 2009 Gold Cup. He scored his only international goal against the United States in the 2009 CONCACAF Gold Cup Final.

== Honours ==
América

- Mexican Primera División: Verano 2002, Clausura 2005
- Campeón de Campeones: 2005
- CONCACAF Champions' Cup: 2006
- CONCACAF Giants Cup: 2001

Tigres UANL

- North American SuperLiga: 2009

Mexico

- CONCACAF Gold Cup: 2009

Individual

- Mexican Primera División Best Defensive Wing Back: Apertura 2005

== Career statistics ==
=== International ===
As of match played 18 March 2010

National team	Year	Apps	Goals
Mexico	2003	5	0
Mexico	2005	1	0
Mexico	2006	8	0
Mexico	2007	8	0
Mexico	2008	1	0
Mexico	2009	11	1
Mexico	2010	1	0
Total		35	1

=== International goals ===
Scores and results list Mexico's goal tally first.

Goal	Date	Venue	Opponent	Score	Result	Competition
1.	July 26, 2009	Giants Stadium, East Rutherford, New Jersey, United States	United States	4–0	5–0	2009 CONCACAF Gold Cup
