= Monès Chéry =

Haitian footballer (born 1981)

Personal information
- Date of birth: 12 February 1981 (age 45)
- Place of birth: Gonaïves, Haiti
- Position: Midfielder

Youth career
- Racing Club Haïtien

Senior career*
Years	Team	Apps	(Gls)
2002	Roulado	48	(12)
2003–2006	Don Bosco	22	(0)
2006–2009	Racing Club Haïtien		
2009–2018	Aiglon du Lamentin		
2023	Violette		

International career
2003–2010	Haiti	53	(6)
- * Club domestic league appearances and goals

Monès Chéry (born 12 February 1981) is a Haitian former professional footballer who played as a midfielder. He debuted in the 2007 CONCACAF Gold Cup for Haiti and was also on the Haiti roster for the 2009 CONCACAF Gold Cup.
