= Andy Herron =

Costa Rican footballer (born 1978)

Personal information
- Full name: Andy Francisco Herron Aguilar
- Date of birth: February 3, 1978 (age 48)
- Place of birth: Limón, Costa Rica
- Height: 5 ft 10 in (1.78 m)
- Position: Forward

Youth career
- Limonense

Senior career*
Years	Team	Apps	(Gls)
1996–2001	Limonense	86	(23)
2001–2002	Santos de Guápiles	54	(15)
2003–2004	Herediano	47	(26)
2004–2006	Chicago Fire	44	(15)
2006	→ Herediano (loan)	0	(0)
2007	Columbus Crew	18	(4)
2008	Puntarenas	7	(1)
2008	Chicago Fire	17	(0)
2009	Herediano	29	(12)
2009–2010	Ramonense	6	(0)
2010–2011	USAC	33	(15)
2011–2012	Limón	14	(2)
2012–2013	Fort Lauderdale Strikers	21	(8)
2013	Atlanta Silverbacks	0	(0)
Total		376	(121)

International career
2002–2009	Costa Rica	25	(10)
- * Club domestic league appearances and goals

Andy Francisco Herron Aguilar (born February 2, 1978) is a Costa Rican former professional footballer who played as a forward.

== Club career ==
Before joining the Chicago Fire in late in 2004, Herron played two years with Costa Rican Herediano, which he led to Costa Rica's 2004's title, by leading the Costa Rican clausura's tournament with 14 goals and 13 assists. He had joined Herediano after he left Santos de Guápiles in December 2002. Herron had his best season for Chicago in 2006, when the 2006 Budweiser/Fire Golden Boot winner proved his productivity for the "Men in Red" by scoring eight goals in 20 games, with 18 starts. Herron put the team on his shoulders in the team's 2006 Lamar Hunt U.S. Open Cup championship run, scoring four goals and one assist through the competition. His assist and game-winning goal against the Los Angeles Galaxy in the Final at Toyota Park helped the Fire clinch an MLS club-record fourth title to the trophy case.

After two and a half seasons in Chicago, he decided to get back to Club Sport Herediano on a loan from Chicago, but soon after that was sent to Columbus for the second pick in the 2007 MLS SuperDraft (which turned out to be Bakary Soumare) and forward Ryan Coiner. In the MLS Reserve Division he started and played one game for the Crew Reserves, notching one goal in 79 minutes of play.

In February 2008, Herron left Puntarenas and re-signed with Chicago Fire. On November 26, 2008, he was waived by Chicago and he returned to Herediano for the 2009 Verano season. In January 2010 he joined Ramonense and in June 2010 he moved to Guatemala to play for USAC. In summer 2011 he returned to his hometown club after 13 years.

He returned to the United States in January 2012 when he signed with Fort Lauderdale Strikers of the North American Soccer League. In summer 2013 he left Fort Lauderdale to join Atlanta Silverbacks, but left them in August 2013 without any game played for them.

He is now the Concacaf Scout for the Chicago Fire FC.

=== Controversy ===
On January 11, 2006, Herron was suspended for six games without pay for his behavior that led to a red card in a 1–0 loss to the New England Revolution during the Eastern Conference Championship game the previous November 6. According to the MLS Soccer Disciplinary Committee, Herron was disciplined for making "unacceptable physical contact" with the referee Terry Vaughn and assistant referee George Gansner, conduct that led to him being sent off in stoppage time.

On April 19, 2007, Herron elbowed New England's Jay Heaps in a nationally televised game. The on-field officials did not see the action. Major League Soccer suspended Herron for four games and fined $3,000.

== International career ==
Herron made his debut for Costa Rica in a November 2002 friendly match against Ecuador, also recording his first international goal, and earned a total of 25 caps, scoring 7 goals. He represented his country in 9 FIFA World Cup qualification matches and played at the 2003 UNCAF Nations Cup and 2009 CONCACAF Gold Cup. Being an unmovable striker in Jorge Luis Pinto's squad and scoring the goal which took Costa Rica to the quarterfinals in the 2004 Copa América held in Chile. He tallied 11 goals in eight games with the Costa Rican U-23 squad during Olympic Qualifying from 1999–2000.

His final international was an August 2009 FIFA World Cup qualification match against Honduras.

== Personal life ==
Herron has three children. He grew up playing in the streets of Puerto Limón, Costa Rica. He is a big basketball and Chicago Bulls fan.

He lives in Florida with his family.

== Career statistics ==
=== International ===
Appearances and goals by national team and year
National team	Year	Apps	Goals
Costa Rica	2002	1	1
Costa Rica	2003	3	0
Costa Rica	2004	9	3
Costa Rica	2005	2	1
Costa Rica	2006	2	0
Costa Rica	2009	8	2
Total		25	7

Scores and results list Costa Rica's goal tally first, score column indicates score after each Herron goal.

List of international goals scored by Andy Herron
No.	Date	Venue	Opponent	Score	Result	Competition	Ref.
1	20 November 2002	Atahualpa Olympic Stadium, Quito, Ecuador	Ecuador	2–0	2–2	Friendly	
2	14 July 2004	Estadio Jorge Basadre, Tacna, Peru	Chile	2–1	2–1	2004 Copa América	
3	18 August 2004	Estadio Alejandro Morera Soto, Alajuela, Costa Rica	Honduras	1–0	2–5	2006 FIFA World Cup qualification	
4	18 August 2004	Estadio Alejandro Morera Soto, Alajuela, Costa Rica	Honduras	2–2	2–5	2006 FIFA World Cup qualification	
5	12 January 2005	Estadio Ricardo Saprissa Aymá, San Juan de Tibás, Costa Rica	Haiti	3–0	3–3	Friendly	
6	10 July 2009	FIU Stadium, Miami, United States	Canada	1–0	2–2	2009 CONCACAF Gold Cup	
7	17 July 2009	AT&T Stadium, Arlington, United States	Guadeloupe	3–0	5–1	2009 CONCACAF Gold Cup	

== Honours ==
Limonense

- Segunda División de Costa Rica: 1997–98

Chicago Fire

- U.S. Open Cup: 2006

Costa Rica

- UNCAF Nations Cup: 2003
