= Vaniel Sirin =

Haitian footballer (born 1989)

Vaniel Sirin (born 20 October 1989 in Delmas, Haiti) is a Haitian footballer who plays for club Sheikh Jamal Dhanmondi Club in Bangladesh League.

== Career ==
Sirin played for the Haiti national football team at the 2009 CONCACAF Gold Cup, where he scored a goal in a group stage match against the United States.

He also capped for the national under-17 and national under-20 teams.
