= Santino Quaranta =

American soccer player

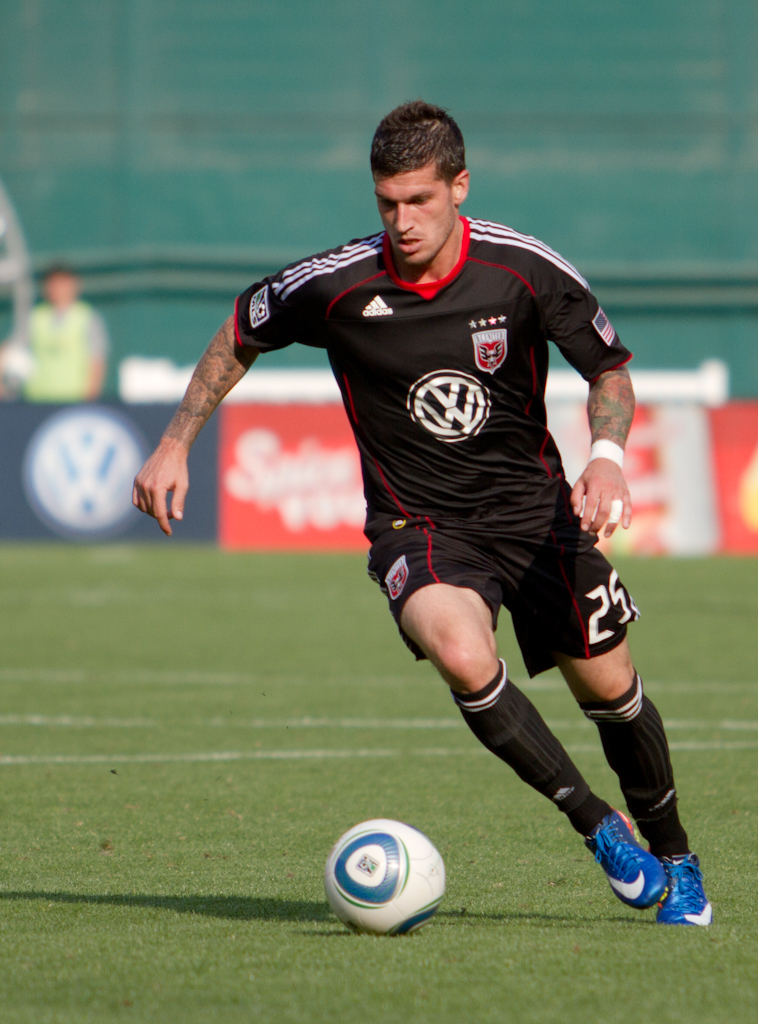
- Quaranta playing for D.C. United

Personal information
- Full name: Santino Quaranta
- Date of birth: October 14, 1984 (age 42)
- Place of birth: Baltimore, Maryland, U.S.
- Height: 6 ft 1 in (1.85 m)
- Positions: Winger; second striker

Youth career
- 2000–2001: IMG Soccer Academy

Senior career*
Years	Team	Apps	(Gls)
2001–2006	D.C. United	62	(14)
2006–2007	Los Angeles Galaxy	18	(3)
2007	New York Red Bulls	3	(0)
2008–2011	D.C. United	97	(11)
Total		180	(28)

International career
2001	United States U17	3	(0)
2003	United States U20	4	(0)
2005–2009	United States	15	(1)

Managerial career
- 2014–2016: Baltimore Bohemians
Medal record
Representing United States
Winner	CONCACAF Gold Cup	2005
Runner-up	CONCACAF Gold Cup	2009
Men's Soccer
- * Club domestic league appearances and goals

Santino Quaranta (born October 14, 1984) is an American former professional soccer player.

== Career ==
=== Youth ===
Quaranta partially attended Baltimore's Archbishop Curley High School for his freshman and sophomore years, where he started both years, and was recognized as one of the top soccer players in the state. Quaranta did not play college soccer, and instead spent time with the US U-17 national team at the IMG Soccer Academy in Bradenton, Florida, where he achieved exceptional success.

=== Professional ===
Quaranta was drafted eighth overall in the 2001 MLS SuperDraft by D.C. United. At 16 years, four months, Quaranta surpassed fellow DC player Bobby Convey to become the youngest player in the history of Major League Soccer, a record which would subsequently be taken by another DC player, Freddy Adu.

Quaranta immediately excelled in MLS, registering five goals and one assist in just 16 games during the 2001 season. Unfortunately, in the subsequent three seasons, Quaranta was beset by injuries, and struggled to live up to his early promise. Although he started all eleven games that he played in during the 2002 season, Quaranta missed almost two-thirds of the season with injuries, and things did not improve in the following two seasons, where he played in just 13 games. With fitness restored, Quaranta returned to form in 2005, where he contributed 5 goals and 5 assists in 18 games played, and finished third highest at the club for goals scored that season.

Quaranta was traded to Los Angeles Galaxy from D.C. United for a partial allocation and a conditional draft pick on August 9, 2006. In his first match with the Galaxy the next day, Quaranta entered as a substitute and scored the only goal of the match in a 1–0 win over Houston.

On June 30, 2007, the Galaxy traded Quaranta to the New York Red Bulls, getting a conditional fourth round pick in the 2008 MLS SuperDraft in return. After featuring in just 3 games and 47 minutes for the team, he was waived by the Red Bulls on January 3, 2008.

Quaranta returned to D.C. United on March 6, 2008. He claims to have turned down larger offers from other MLS sides, but felt he still had a point to prove at D.C.

His first meaningful game back with D.C. United was as a substitute in the home leg of the quarterfinals of the CONCACAF Champions' Cup against Harbour View of Jamaica. He had two assists in the 5–0 victory.

In his first regular season home game back with D.C. United on April 5, 2008, Quaranta picked up a goal and an assist.

Following the 2011 season, Quaranta's option was not picked up by United, and he opted to retire. It was a very brief retirement as he quickly joined the new Premier League Soccer in India. He has claimed this is due to his salary being more than double his last MLS remuneration. However, a month later, the league was canceled before the season began.

=== International ===
Quaranta has played internationally for the Under-17 and Under-20 United States national soccer teams, but while he was dominant for the U-17's, he was not able to secure a starting place on the U-20's (although he did play in the 2003 FIFA World Youth Championship). After coming back from injuries in 2005, Quaranta received his first cap for the senior team July 7, 2005 in a Gold Cup match against Cuba. He converted a penalty kick in the United States' shootout victory over Panama in the Gold Cup championship game. In 2009, Quaranta was named to the United States roster for that year's edition of the CONCACAF Gold Cup. On July 8, 2009, he scored his first international goal against Honduras during a 2–0 victory in CONCACAF Gold Cup group play.

=== Coaching ===
On February 19, 2014, Quaranta took over from Steve Nichols as the head coach of the Baltimore Bohemians of the US Premier Development League. The club has been on hiatus since January 2017.

=== International goals ===
#	Date	Venue	Opponent	Score	Result	Competition
01.	July 8, 2009	RFK Stadium, Washington, D.C., United States	Honduras	1 – 0	2 – 0	2009 CONCACAF Gold Cup

== Personal ==
Quaranta is married and has two children: a daughter, Olivia Naomi Quaranta (2003) and a son, Valentino (2009). In 2011, Quaranta and Sean Rush started the Pipeline Soccer Club, a non-profit soccer club in Baltimore, MD, which both of his children played in. As of September 2022, Olivia is a member of the Loyola Greyhounds women's soccer team, while Valentino followed in his father's footsteps and joined the D.C. United Academy's U-14 team.

=== Problems with drugs ===
In a June 14, 2008 interview with the Washington Post, Quaranta admitted to once having an addiction to painkillers and cocaine, but after a spell in rehab, he has stopped taking both. He now has a tattoo on his arm with the date that he became sober as a constant reminder of his past struggles.

== Honors ==
=== United States ===
- CONCACAF Gold Cup Champions (1): 2005

=== D.C. United ===
- MLS Cup (1): 2004
- U.S. Open Cup (1): 2008
