= Clarence Goodson =

American soccer player (born 1982)

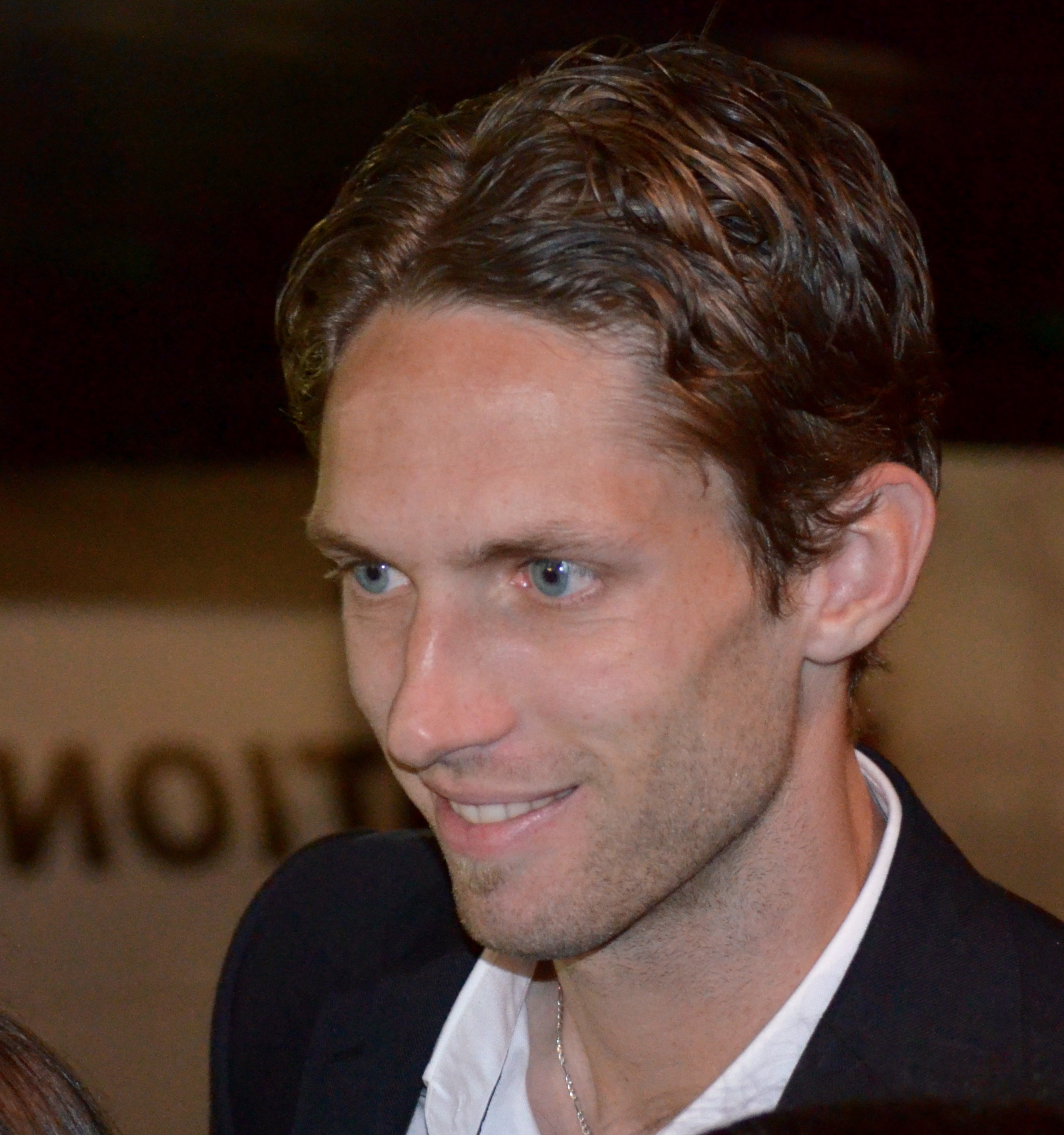
- Goodson in 2015

Personal information
- Full name: Clarence Edgar Goodson IV
- Date of birth: May 17, 1982 (age 44)
- Place of birth: Alexandria, Virginia, United States
- Height: 6 ft 4 in (1.93 m)
- Position: Defender

College career
Years	Team	Apps	(Gls)
2000–2003	Maryland Terrapins		

Senior career*
Years	Team	Apps	(Gls)
2003	Boulder Rapids Reserve	12	(1)
2004–2007	FC Dallas	74	(3)
2008–2010	IK Start	69	(10)
2011–2013	Brøndby	60	(6)
2013–2016	San Jose Earthquakes	49	(2)
Total		264	(22)

International career
2008–2014	United States	46	(5)
Medal record
Representing United States
Winner	CONCACAF Gold Cup	2013
Runner-up	CONCACAF Gold Cup	2009
Runner-up	CONCACAF Gold Cup	2011
Men's Soccer
- * Club domestic league appearances and goals

Clarence Edgar Goodson IV (born May 17, 1982) is an American former soccer player who played as a defender.

== Youth career ==
Born in Alexandria, Virginia, Goodson attended Annandale High School his freshman and sophomore seasons before moving to Wilbert Tucker Woodson High School. He was the Annandale team MVP, setting a school record for goals and points by a sophomore in 1998. He then went on to win the Virginia State High School Soccer title playing for W.T. Woodson High School in 2000. He played his club soccer with the Braddock Road Warhawks, winning the 1999 U-17 national championship. Goodson played three years of soccer at the University of Maryland, which he joined in 2000. After redshirting in 2001, Goodson helped anchor the defense of one of the best teams in college soccer. In his career at Maryland, Goodson played 66 games, registering 10 goals and 11 assists. In 2003, he spent the collegiate offseason with the Boulder Rapids Reserve.

== Club career ==
After his junior year, Goodson signed a Project-40 with Major League Soccer (MLS), entering the 2004 MLS SuperDraft as an underclassman, where he was drafted seventh overall by the Dallas Burn. In his first year with the Burn, Goodson played only 247 league minutes in five games; however, he saw extended action in Cup competitions and exhibitions. He became a starter in 2005, the year the team was renamed FC Dallas.

On November 21, 2007, Goodson was selected by the San Jose Earthquakes in the 2007 MLS Expansion Draft but declared that he would not be signing a new contract with MLS in January 2008; instead, he signed a contract with the Norwegian team IK Start. He remained with Start through the 2010 season. In November 2010, Goodson signed with Brøndby of the Danish Superliga.

Goodson returned to MLS on June 28, 2013, when he signed with San Jose Earthquakes.

Goodson served as an elected board member for the Major League Soccer Players Association (Union) and was a critical leader to establish a new Collective Bargaining Agreement for MLS athletes.

=== International ===
Goodson made his international debut in a friendly against Sweden on January 19, 2008. He was a member of the U.S. squad at the 2009 CONCACAF Gold Cup, and scored in the semifinal against Honduras on July 23, 2009. On May 26, 2010, Goodson was selected to be part of the 23 man roster for the American national team at the 2010 FIFA World Cup in South Africa.

Goodson served as an elected Union Representative for U.S. Soccer.

Goodson has been used in the rotation of Centerbacks for the U.S. Men's National Team under Jürgen Klinsmann. Goodson was named to the United States roster for the 2013 CONCACAF Gold Cup competition. He was included on Klinsmann's 30-man preliminary roster for the U.S. team at the 2014 FIFA World Cup, but he was not included on the final roster.

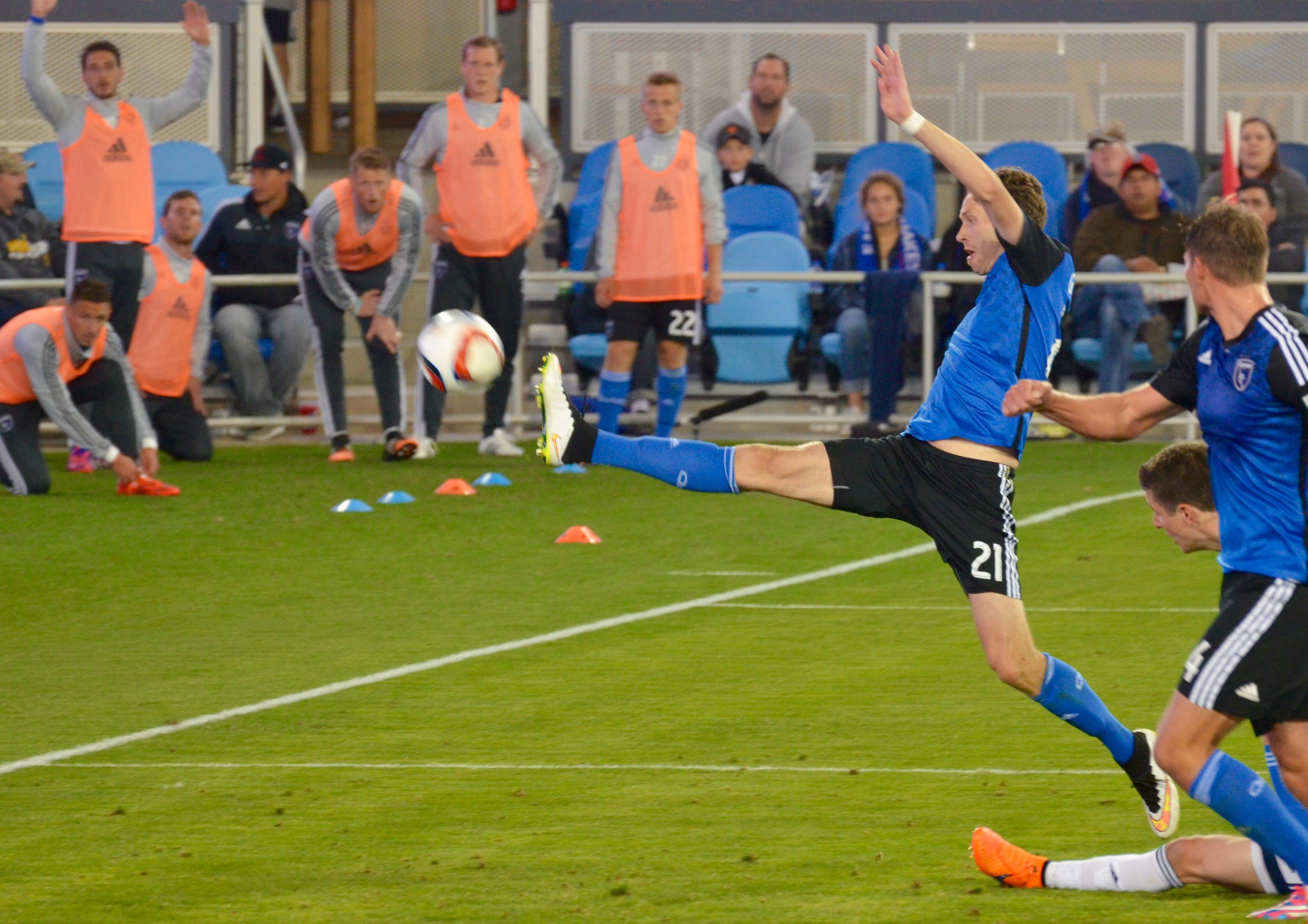
Stretching for a free kick in 2015

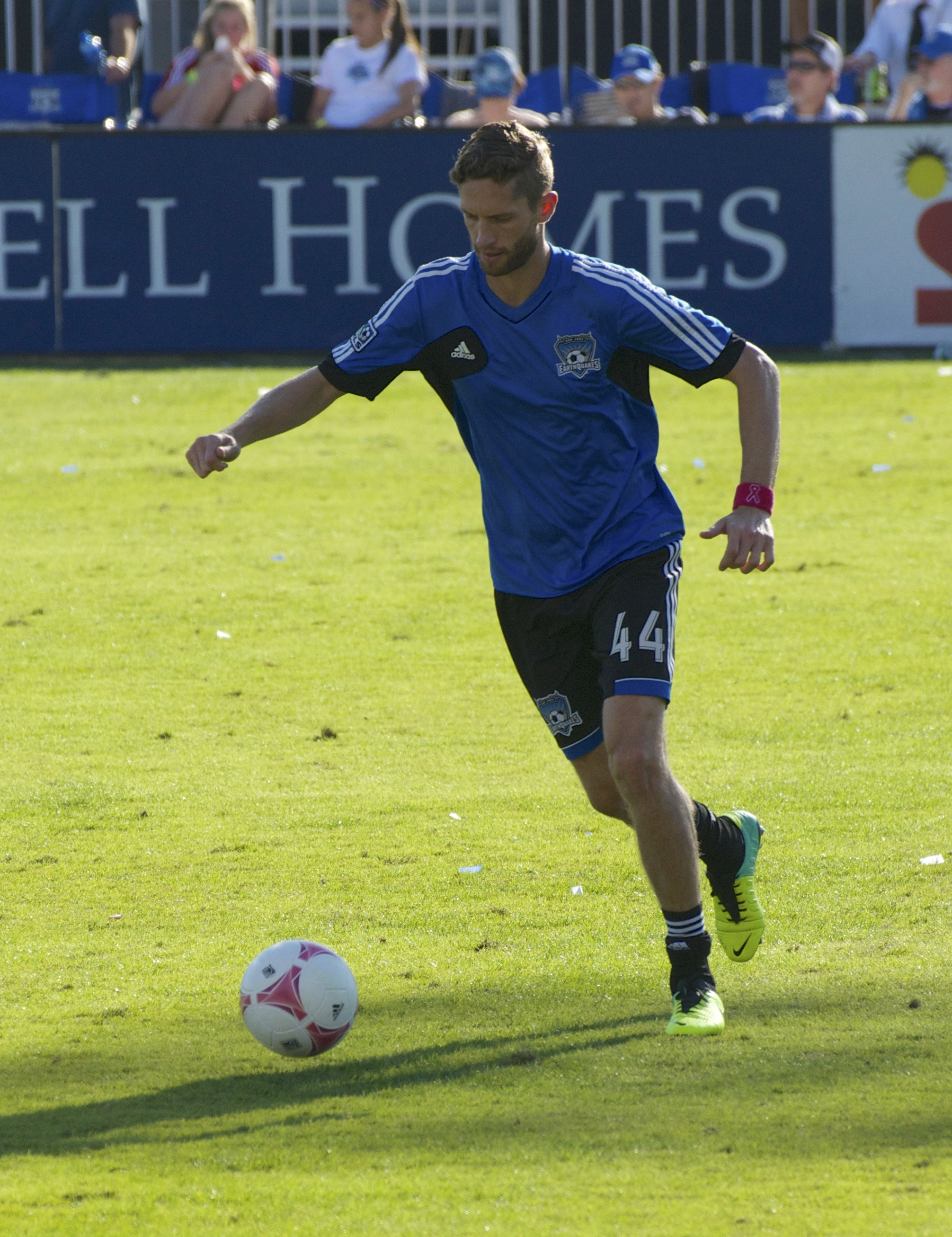
Warming up at Buck Shaw Stadium in 2013

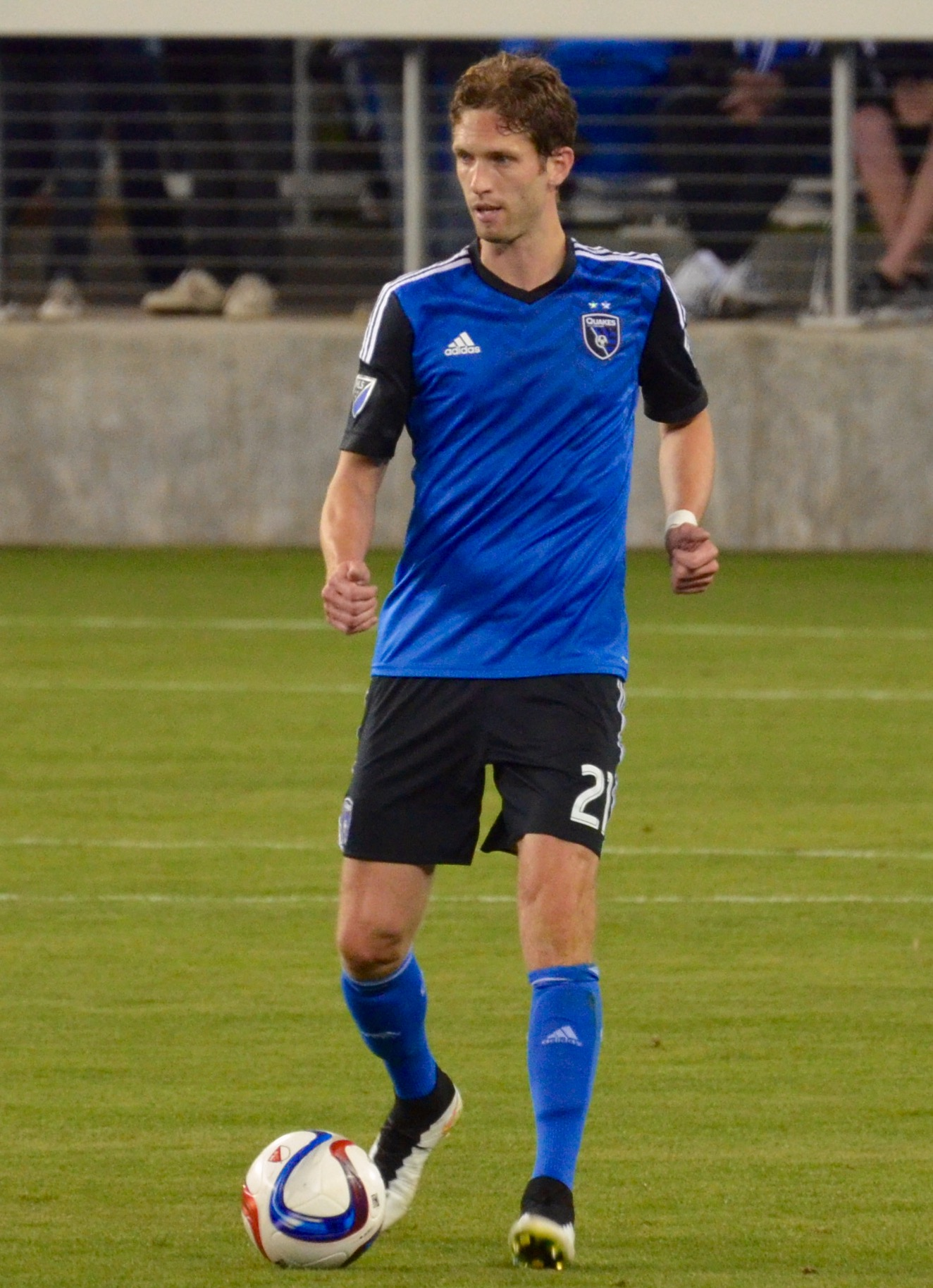
at Avaya Stadium in 2015

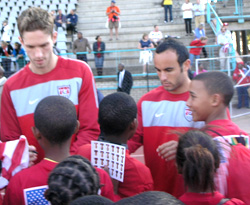
Goodson signing autographs with Landon Donovan during an open training session at the 2010 FIFA World Cup

=== International goals ===
#	Date	Venue	Opponent	Score	Result	Competition
1.	July 23, 2009	Soldier Field, Chicago, United States	Honduras	1 – 0	2–0	2009 CONCACAF Gold Cup
2.	January 23, 2010	Home Depot Center, Carson, United States	Honduras	1 – 3	1–3	Friendly
3.	June 11, 2011	Raymond James Stadium, Tampa, United States	Panama	1 – 2	1–2	2011 CONCACAF Gold Cup
4	July 5, 2013	Qualcomm Stadium, San Diego, United States	Guatemala	5 – 0	6–0	Friendly
5	July 21, 2013	M&T Bank Stadium, Baltimore, United States	El Salvador	1 – 0	5–1	2013 CONCACAF Gold Cup

== Retirement ==
Goodson retired from professional soccer after a spinal injury in December, 2016. Goodson now works professionally as a players relations manager for MLSPA. He stays active coaching soccer in his community.

Goodson and wife Kelsey, in partnership with the U.S. Soccer Foundation, built a soccer field at his childhood school, North Springfield Elementary School. The Clarence Goodson Field is used to serve underprivileged youth in his childhood neighborhood. The "Mini-Pitch Initiative" is to create a safe space in the community to play, be coached, mentored, and learn the benefits nutrition and exercise, specifically serving U.S. Soccer Foundation Soccer youth teams for underprivileged youth. His generous contribution has inspired other current and former professional athletes to build mini-pitch's in their communities as well. The couple are licensed ministers and serve as Youth Directors in San Jose, California. Goodson is a public and motivational speaker, focusing on teams and youth development.

== Personal ==
Goodson married Kelsey Dawson on January 31, 2009, in Tacoma, Washington. The couple were featured on an episode of HGTV's House Hunters International, searching for an apartment in Copenhagen after Goodson's transfer to Brøndby IF. He purchased an apartment valued at $900,000.

Goodson is a Christian. Goodson participates in a weekly team Bible study.

== Career statistics ==
As of November 11, 2015

Season	Club	League	League		National cup		League cup		Continental		Total	
Season	Club	League	Apps	Goals	Apps	Goals	Apps	Goals	Apps	Goals	Apps	Goals
2004	FC Dallas	Major League Soccer	5	0	2	0	0	0	0	0	7	0
2005	FC Dallas	Major League Soccer	29	2	0	0	2	0	0	0	31	2
2006	FC Dallas	Major League Soccer	13	0	0	0	2	0	0	0	15	0
2007	FC Dallas	Major League Soccer	27	1	1	1	1	1	0	0	29	3
FC Dallas totals			74	3	3	1	5	1	0	0	82	5
2008	Start	First Division	22	4	1	0	0	0	0	0	23	4
2009	Start	Tippeligaen	21	3	2	0	0	0	0	0	23	3
2010	Start	Tippeligaen	26	3	1	0	0	0	0	0	27	3
Start totals			69	10	4	0	0	0	0	0	73	10
2010–11	Brøndby	Superligaen	10	2	0	0	0	0	0	0	10	2
2011–12	Brøndby	Superligaen	31	2	2	0	0	0	2	0	35	2
2012–13	Brøndby	Superligaen	19	2	1	0	0	0	0	0	20	2
Brøndby totals			60	6	3	0	0	0	2	0	65	6
2013	San Jose Earthquakes	Major League Soccer	9	0			0	0	2	0	11	0
2014	San Jose Earthquakes	Major League Soccer	10	0			0	0	0	0	10	0
2015	San Jose Earthquakes	Major League Soccer	28	2			0	0	0	0	28	2
San Jose totals			47	2			0	0	2	0	49	2
Career totals			250	21	10	1	5	1	4	0	269	23

== Honors ==
United States

- CONCACAF Gold Cup: 2013; runner-up 2009, 2011

Individual

- CONCACAF Gold Cup All-Tournament Team: 2009
