= Kenny Cooper =

American soccer player (born 1984)

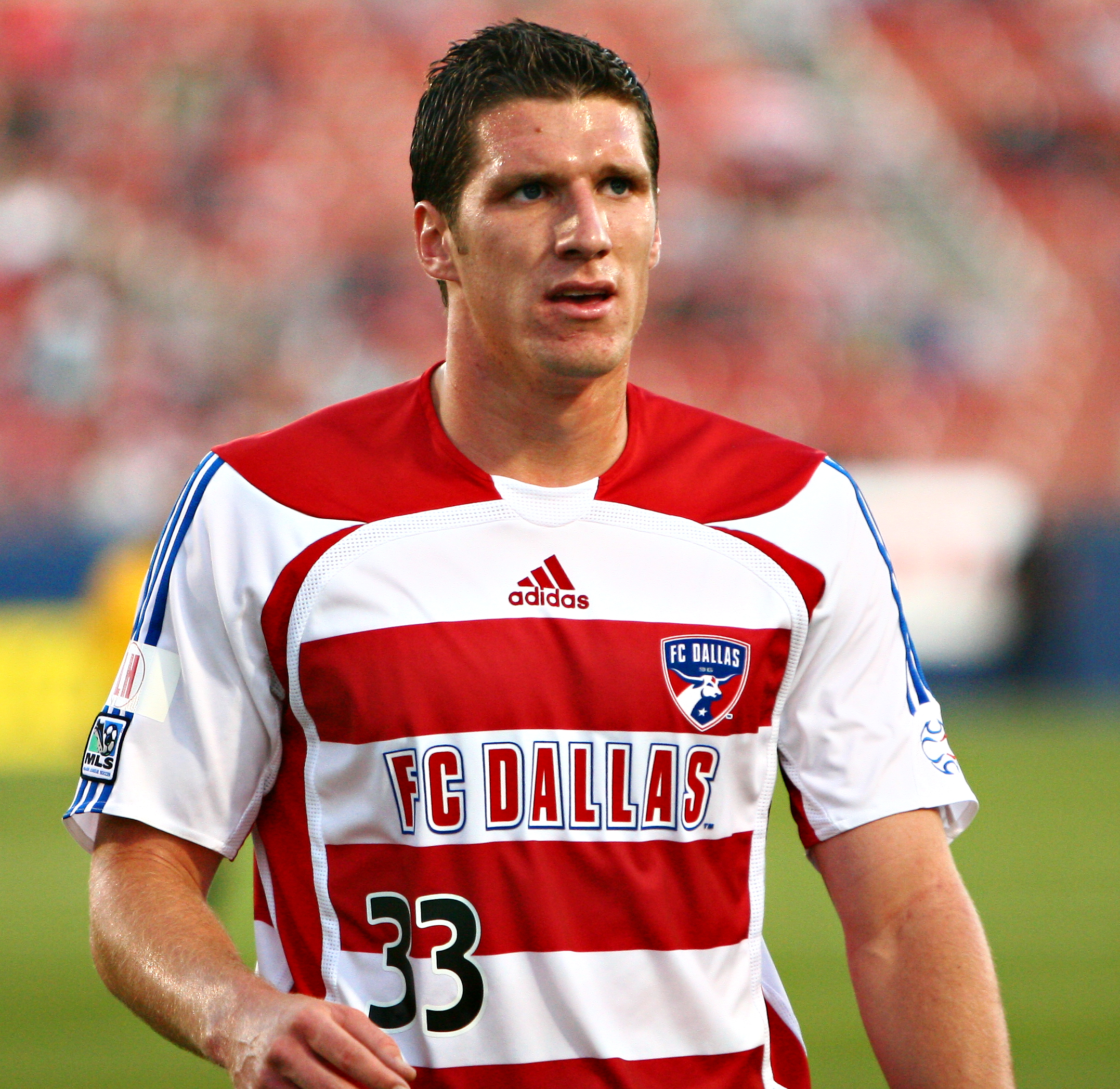
- Cooper in 2007

Personal information
- Full name: Kenneth Scott Cooper Jr.
- Date of birth: October 21, 1984 (age 42)
- Place of birth: Baltimore, Maryland, United States
- Height: 6 ft 3 in (1.91 m)
- Position: Forward

Youth career
- 2003–2004: Manchester United

Senior career*
Years	Team	Apps	(Gls)
2004–2006	Manchester United	0	(0)
2004	→ Académica Coimbra (loan)	10	(0)
2005	→ Oldham Athletic (loan)	7	(3)
2006–2009	FC Dallas	90	(40)
2009–2011	1860 Munich	13	(2)
2010	→ Plymouth Argyle (loan)	7	(0)
2011	Portland Timbers	34	(8)
2012	New York Red Bulls	33	(18)
2013	FC Dallas	31	(6)
2014–2015	Seattle Sounders FC	22	(3)
2015	Montreal Impact	1	(0)
2015	→ FC Montreal (loan)	1	(0)
Total		249	(270)

International career
2007–2009	United States	10	(4)
Medal record
Representing United States
Runner-up	CONCACAF Gold Cup	2009
Men's Soccer
- * Club domestic league appearances and goals

Kenneth Scott Cooper Jr. (born October 21, 1984) is an American former soccer player who played as a forward. He began his soccer career with Manchester United but failed to break into the first team. He went on to play for clubs in Portugal, Germany, England, the United States, and Canada.

== Early life ==
Cooper's father, Kenny Cooper Sr., played professional soccer as a goalkeeper in England before moving to the United States to play for the Dallas Tornado of the North American Soccer League. Cooper was born in Baltimore, Maryland, and, under his father's mentorship, he became an outstanding youth player. After retiring from coaching professional soccer, Cooper's father settled the family in Dallas, Texas, where Cooper attended high school at Jesuit College Preparatory School of Dallas. He was the Dallas area high school player of the year while playing, graduating in 2003.

== Club career ==
=== Manchester United ===
While playing with the Dallas Solar 85 Soccer Club in the Dallas Cup, an international youth tournament, Cooper caught the attention of several former NASL players who contacted Jimmy Ryan, Director of Youth Football at Manchester United. Ryan had also once played with Cooper's father when they were both with the Tornado. Ryan contacted the Coopers and invited Kenny to England for a trial. The fact that Cooper's father was a native of England helped grease the skids for Cooper, as United did not need to acquire a work permit for him. Following a successful week-long trial, United signed him on a free transfer. At the time, Cooper had intended to attend Southern Methodist University, but decided to forgo playing college soccer to pursue his professional career.

=== FC Dallas ===
Cooper signed with FC Dallas on February 6, 2006, and made an immediate impact on the team. He made his first MLS appearance on April 1, 2006, and scored his first MLS goal, helping FC Dallas to a 3–2 victory against the Chicago Fire. Cooper made his first MLS start the following week against Real Salt Lake on April 8, 2006, scoring the team's first goal in a 2–1 victory. He finished his first MLS season tied for sixth in goals scored with 11 and made 31 appearances. At the start of the 2007 MLS Season, Cooper scored four goals in the first eight games before he suffered a broken right tibia in a 3–1 win against the Los Angeles Galaxy by a strong tackle from Tyrone Marshall that put him out for the majority of the season. This ended his hopes of playing in the 2007 Copa América and for the national team. Cooper ended the 2007 season with a total of 12 starts out of 14 appearances, four goals, and two assists.

Cooper was linked with a possible move to Cardiff City on July 27, 2008, after the club made a £2,000,000 bid. Norway's Rosenborg bid more than that and also offered a salary of $1.2 million. MLS ultimately rejected both bids and decided to keep him.

In the 2008 MLS season, Cooper led FC Dallas with 18 goals and started all 30 games. He was the only FC Dallas player to appear in all regular season games that year. Cooper finished the season tied for the league lead with four game-winning goals. Fourteen of Cooper's 18 goals either tied or gave FC Dallas the lead, while the other four increased the team's lead. He was named to his first MLS All-Star First XI selection and MLS Best XI team. He earned back-to-back MLS Player of the Week honors for his two-goal performances against the Los Angeles Galaxy (4–0 win) on July 27, 2008, and Toronto FC (2–0 win) on August 8, 2008. Cooper was also named the MLS Comeback Player of the Year for 2008.

=== 1860 Munich ===
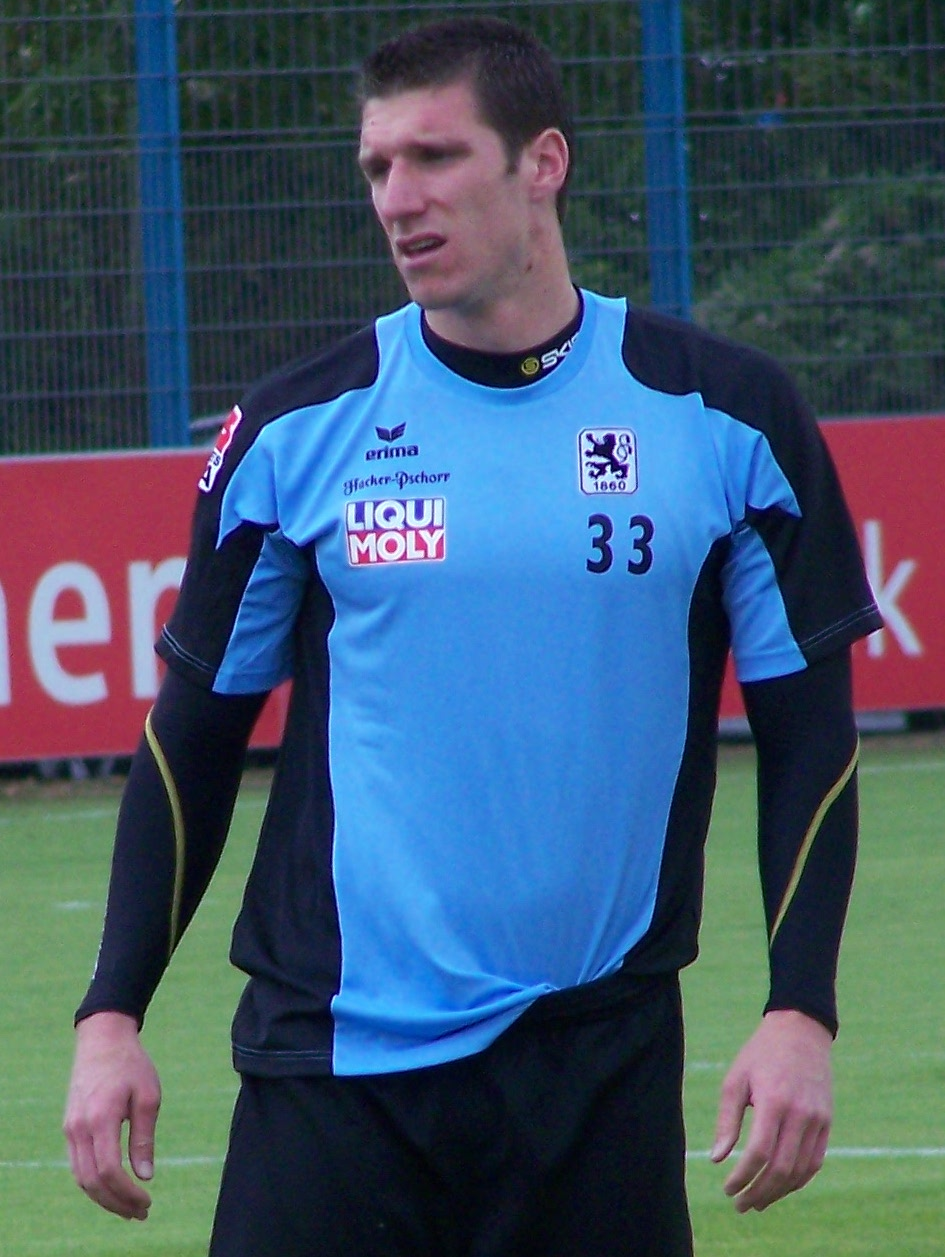
Cooper in his 1860 Munich training kit

On July 31, 2009, FC Dallas announced that Cooper had been sold to 2. Bundesliga club TSV 1860 Munich. As per league policy, the terms of the deal were not disclosed. However, German teams do disclose transfer amounts. Cooper was sold for $700,000 in 2009; the contract ran for three years. He scored his first goal for 1860 Munich in his debut on August 9, 2009.

=== Plymouth Argyle ===
On January 28, 2010, Cooper left Munich to return to England, signing for Plymouth Argyle on loan until the end of the 2009–10 season with a view to a permanent move at the end of the season. However, the club did not take up this option.

=== Portland Timbers ===
On January 13, 2011, TSV 1860 Munich announced that Cooper would not fulfil his contract, which was set to run until June 2012, and would be joining Portland Timbers on a free transfer. While Timbers technical director Gavin Wilkinson initially cautioned that a deal had yet to be struck, on January 17, 2011, he announced Portland had finally completed Cooper's transfer and that he would be joining the team pending the receipt of his International Transfer Certificate. He scored the first MLS goal for the Portland Timbers in a 3–1 loss on their MLS debut against the Colorado Rapids on March 19, 2011. He scored his third goal of the season in a 1–0 win over Real Salt Lake. This marked the Timbers' first shutout win and snapped Salt Lake's 18-game unbeaten streak.

=== New York Red Bulls ===
On January 12, 2012, Cooper was traded to the New York Red Bulls for a first-round 2013 MLS SuperDraft pick and an undisclosed amount of allocation money. He made his MLS regular season debut with the New York Red Bulls on Sunday, March 11, and scored his first goal for the Red Bulls against FC Dallas, his former team, at FC Dallas Stadium. Cooper was the top scorer for the team during the 2012 MLS Season.

=== FC Dallas ===
Cooper was re-acquired by FC Dallas from New York on February 4, 2013, in exchange for allocation money. He appeared in 31 regular-season games during the 2013 season, scoring 6 goals.

=== Seattle Sounders FC ===
Having failed to reach an agreement on a new contract with FC Dallas, Cooper was due to be made available in the 2013 MLS Re-Entry Draft. However, on 13 December 2013, prior to the draft, Seattle Sounders FC announced that they had acquired the rights to negotiate a contract with Cooper, as well as allocation money, in exchange for midfielder Adam Moffat, and signed him to a contract on December 19, 2013. In his first season with the club, Cooper helped Seattle capture the 2014 Lamar Hunt U.S. Open Cup, scoring six goals in four games, including a two-goal, two-assist effort in the semifinals against Chicago on August 13. He was named the U.S. Open Cup Player of the Tournament.

=== Montreal Impact ===
On April 12, 2015, Cooper moved to the Montreal Impact via MLS waivers. He made only one appearance with the club due to an injury.

Cooper had trials with Orlando City SC, New York Red Bulls, Sporting Kansas City, and FC Dallas, but no playing contracts were agreed.

== International career ==
After the retirement of Brian McBride, Cooper was considered to be a potential long-term solution at striker for the national team. Cooper earned his first cap and goal for the national team on January 20, 2007, against Denmark, where he scored a goal after coming on near the end of the game. He then appeared in a game against Guatemala, played at his MLS club's home stadium, Pizza Hut Park, as a second half sub. He was unable to take part in the 2007 Copa América after he was sidelined with a broken right tibia. On November 20, 2008, Cooper got his first World Cup Qualifying start and his first World Cup qualifying-round goal against Guatemala in the final game of the semifinal group stage. On July 18, 2009, Cooper took a boot to the chest from Roman Torres of Panama, resulting in a penalty kick, which he took to put the U.S. through to the semifinal round of the CONCACAF Gold Cup. Five days later, Cooper scored near the end of the match against Honduras to give the U.S. a 2–0 lead and to put them safely into the final of the 2009 CONCACAF Gold Cup. He has a total of 10 international appearances (caps) with 4 goals.

== Personal life ==
Cooper married Molly Grimm in Charleston, South Carolina, on January 7, 2012. He currently serves as an ambassador for FC Dallas, providing coaching and mentorship.

== Career statistics ==
=== Club ===
Appearances and goals by club, season and competition
Club	Season	League		National cup		League cup		Continental		Other (Note: Includes Football League Trophy and MLS Cup Playoffs.)		Total	
Club	Season	Apps	Goals	Apps	Goals	Apps	Goals	Apps	Goals	Apps	Goals	Apps	Goals
Manchester United	2004–05	0	0	0	0	0	0	0	0	0	0	0	0
Manchester United	2005–06	0	0	0	0	0	0	0	0	0	0	0	0
Académica Coimbra (loan)	2004–05	10	0									10	0
Oldham Athletic (loan)	2004–05	7	3	1	0	0	0	–		1	0	9	3
FC Dallas	2006	31	11	2	3	–		–		2	0	35	14
FC Dallas	2007	14	4	–		–		–		2	0	16	4
FC Dallas	2008	30	18	2	1	–		–		–		32	19
FC Dallas	2009	15	7	1	0	–		–		–		16	7
1860 Munich	2009–10	6	1			–		–		–		6	1
1860 Munich	2010–11	7	1	2	1	–		–		–		9	2
Plymouth Argyle (loan)	2009–10	7	0	0	0	0	0	–		–		7	0
Portland Timbers	2011	34	8	–		–		–		–		34	8
New York Red Bulls	2012	33	18	2	1	–		–		2	0	37	19
FC Dallas	2013	31	6	2	2	–		0	0	–		33	8
Seattle Sounders FC	2014	22	3	4	6	0	0	0	0	1	0	27	9
Seattle Sounders FC	2015	0	0	0	0	0	0	0	0	0	0	0	0
Montreal Impact	2015	1	0	0	0	0	0	0	0	0	0	1	0
Career total		248	80	16	14	0	0	0	0	8	0	272	94

=== International ===
Scores and results list United States' goal tally first, score column indicates score after each Cooper goal.

List of international goals scored by Kenny Cooper
No.	Date	Venue	Opponent	Score	Result	Competition	Ref.
1	January 20, 2007	Home Depot Center, Carson, United States	Denmark	3–1	3–1	Friendly	United States vs. Denmark - 20 January 2007 - Soccerway
2	November 20, 2008	Dick's Sporting Goods Park, Denver, United States	Guatemala	1–0	2–0	2010 FIFA World Cup qualification	United States vs. Guatemala - 20 November 2008 - Soccerway
3	July 19, 2009	Lincoln Financial Field, Philadelphia, United States	Panama	2–1	2–1	2009 CONCACAF Gold Cup	United States vs. Panama - 19 July 2009 - Soccerway
4	July 24, 2009	Soldier Field, Chicago, United States	Honduras	2–0	2–0	2009 CONCACAF Gold Cup	Honduras vs. United States - 24 July 2009 - Soccerway

== Honors ==
Dallas FC

- Supporters' Shield runner-up: 2006
- U.S. Open Cup runner-up 2007

Seattle Sounders

- U.S. Open Cup: 2014
- Western Conference: 2014

USA

- CONCACAF Gold Cup runner-up: 2009

Individual

- MLS Best XI: 2008
- CONCACAF Gold Cup All-Tournament Team: 2009
- MLS Comeback Player of the Year Award: 2008
