= Pablo Herrera (footballer) =

Costa Rican footballer (born 1987)

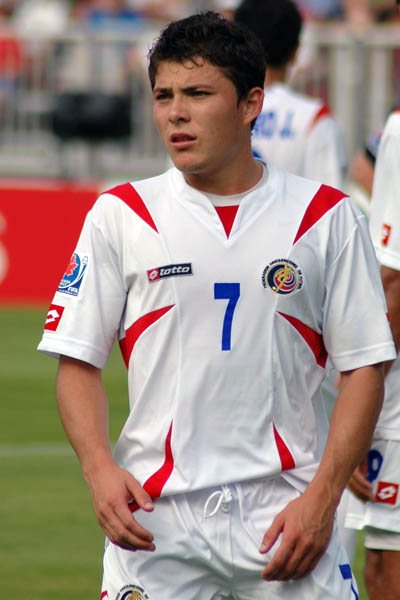

Personal information
- Full name: Pablo Roberto Herrera Barrantes
- Date of birth: 14 February 1987 (age 39)
- Place of birth: Alajuela, Costa Rica
- Height: 1.67 m (5 ft 6 in)
- Positions: Defender; midfielder

Senior career*
Years	Team	Apps	(Gls)
2006–2009	Alajuelense	34	(4)
2009–2011	Aalesund	28	(5)
2012–2013	Uruguay de Coronado	27	(6)
2013–2015	Cartaginés	51	(6)
2015–2016	Uruguay de Coronado	3	(0)
2016	La U	6	(1)
2016–2017	Pérez Zeledón	9	(1)
2020	Marineros de PFC		
2021	Municipal Grecia	15	(1)
2023	Uruguay de Coronado		
2023	Inter de San Carlos		
2023–2024	Puntarenas	10	(0)
2024	PFA Antioquia		

International career
2007–2014	Costa Rica	29	(4)
- * Club domestic league appearances and goals

Pablo Roberto Herrera Barrantes (born 14 February 1987) is a Costa Rican former professional footballer.

== Club career ==
After playing for Alajuelense, Herrera joined Norwegian club Aalesund in August 2009. After the 2011-season, Aalesund and Herrera decided to terminate the contract, as Herrera never managed to recover from an injury. In September 2012, he was snapped up by Uruguay de Coronado and in summer 2013 he joined Cartaginés.

In December 2014, Cartaginés declared they could lose the player over a legal battle with former club Alajuelense.

== International career ==
Herrera played at the 2007 FIFA U-20 World Cup in Canada.

He made his senior debut for Costa Rica in a friendly against Peru on 22 August 2007. He scored his first goal in a 2010 FIFA World Cup qualifying match against the United States on 3 June 2009.

== Career statistics ==
Season	Club	Division	League		Cup		Total	
Season	Club	Division	Apps	Goals	Apps	Goals	Apps	Goals
2009	Aalesund	Tippeligaen	8	2	2	0	10	2
2010	Aalesund	Tippeligaen	19	3	1	0	20	3
2011	Aalesund	Tippeligaen	1	0	0	0	1	0
Career Total			28	5	3	0	31	5
