= James Marcelin =

Haitian footballer (born 1986)

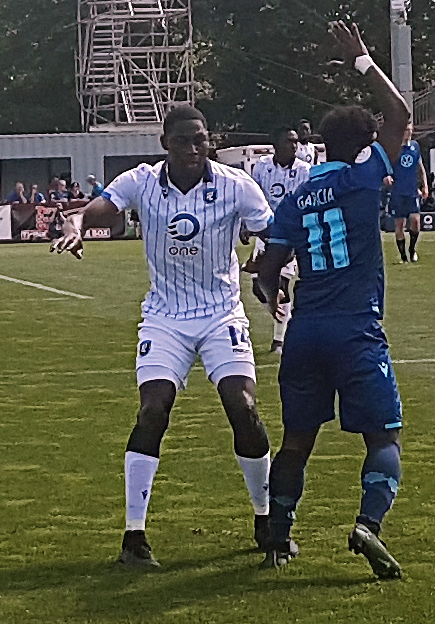
- Marcelin (left) in 2019 with FC Edmonton

Personal information
- Full name: James Marcelin
- Date of birth: 13 June 1986 (age 40)
- Place of birth: Saint-Marc, Haiti
- Height: 1.88 m (6 ft 2 in)
- Positions: Midfielder; defender

Senior career*
Years	Team	Apps	(Gls)
2002–2006	Roulado		
2007	Racing Club Haïtien		
2008–2009	Puerto Rico Islanders	31	(0)
2010	Portland Timbers (USL)	25	(0)
2011–2012	Portland Timbers	23	(0)
2012	FC Dallas	16	(0)
2013	Antigua Barracuda FC	3	(0)
2014–2015	Fort Lauderdale Strikers	34	(2)
2016–2017	North Carolina FC	45	(2)
2018	Miami United		
2019	FC Edmonton	21	(0)

International career^{‡}
2007–2016	Haiti	34	(5)
- * Club domestic league appearances and goals as of 19 October 2019 ‡ National team caps and goals as of 23 July 2016

James Marcelin (born 13 June 1986) is a Haitian former professional footballer who played as a midfielder and defender.

== Club career ==
=== Early career ===
Born in Saint-Marc, Haiti, Marcelin began his career with Roulado when he was sixteen, helping the team win the Ligue Haïtienne title in 2003, before moving to Racing Club Haïtien in 2007.

=== Puerto Rico Islanders ===
In 2008, he moved to the Puerto Rico Islanders of the USL First Division, where he saw limited playing time in league games. However, he played heavily in Puerto Rico's 2008–09 CONCACAF Champions League games. In 2009, he became a regular first team starter.

=== Portland Timbers ===
On 11 February 2010, the Portland Timbers (USL) of the USSF D2 Pro League signed Marcelin to a one-year contract for the 2010 season where he quickly established himself as a regular first-team starter. He continued with the Timbers when they joined Major League Soccer in 2011, appearing in most games of the season and starting in several ones. Marcelin was waived by Portland on 25 April 2012 for 'non soccer related reasons'.

=== FC Dallas ===
He signed with fellow MLS club FC Dallas just over a week later on 4 May 2012 for the rest of the season.

=== Fort Lauderdale Strikers ===
In July 2014 he signed with Fort Lauderdale Strikers of the North American Soccer League.

On 16 December 2014, Marcelin signed with Sporting Kansas City of Major League Soccer but was waived in the preseason.

He re-signed with Fort Lauderdale on 3 March 2015.

=== North Carolina FC ===
Marcelin was traded by Fort Lauderdale to Carolina RailHawks in exchange for Neil Hlavaty on 30 December 2015.

=== Miami United ===
In June 2018, Marcelin signed with National Premier Soccer League side Miami United FC.

=== FC Edmonton ===
On 22 February 2019, Marcelin joined Canadian Premier League side FC Edmonton. He made his debut for the Eddies on May 4 against Valour FC playing the full 90 minutes in a 2–1 victory. At the end of the season Edmonton announced that Marcelin would not be returning to the team in 2020.

== International career ==
In 2006, Marcelin appeared for the Haitian U-21 national team. In 2007 and 2009, Marcelin played for the Haiti national football team at the Gold Cup. On 8 June 2016, Marcelin scored a historic goal for Haiti, making it the first goal scored for Haiti in a Copa América and the first Haitian goal scored against Brazil.

== Career statistics ==
=== International goals ===
As of match played 8 June 2016. Haiti score listed first, score column indicates score after each Marcelin goal.

International goals by date, venue, cap, opponent, score, result and competition
No.	Date	Venue	Cap	Opponent	Score	Result	Competition
1	8 July 2009	Robert F. Kennedy Memorial Stadium, Washington, United States	17	Grenada	2–0	2–0	2009 CONCACAF Gold Cup
2	2 September 2011	Stade Sylvio Cator, Port-au-Prince, Haiti	21	U.S. Virgin Islands	1–0	6–0	2014 FIFA World Cup qualification
3	6 September 2011	Ergilio Hato Stadium, Willemstad, Curaçao	22	Curaçao	2–2	4–2	2014 FIFA World Cup qualification
4	9 October 2015	BBVA Compass Stadium, Houston, United States	30	El Salvador	1–0	3–1	Friendly
5	8 June 2016	Camping World Stadium, Orlando, United States	33	Brazil	1–5	1–7	2016 Copa América

== Honours ==
Roulado

- Ligue Haïtienne: 2003

Puerto Rico Islanders

- Commissioner's Cup: 2008

Individual

- NASL Best XI: 2015
