= Walter Martínez (footballer, born 1982) =

Honduran footballer (1982–2019)

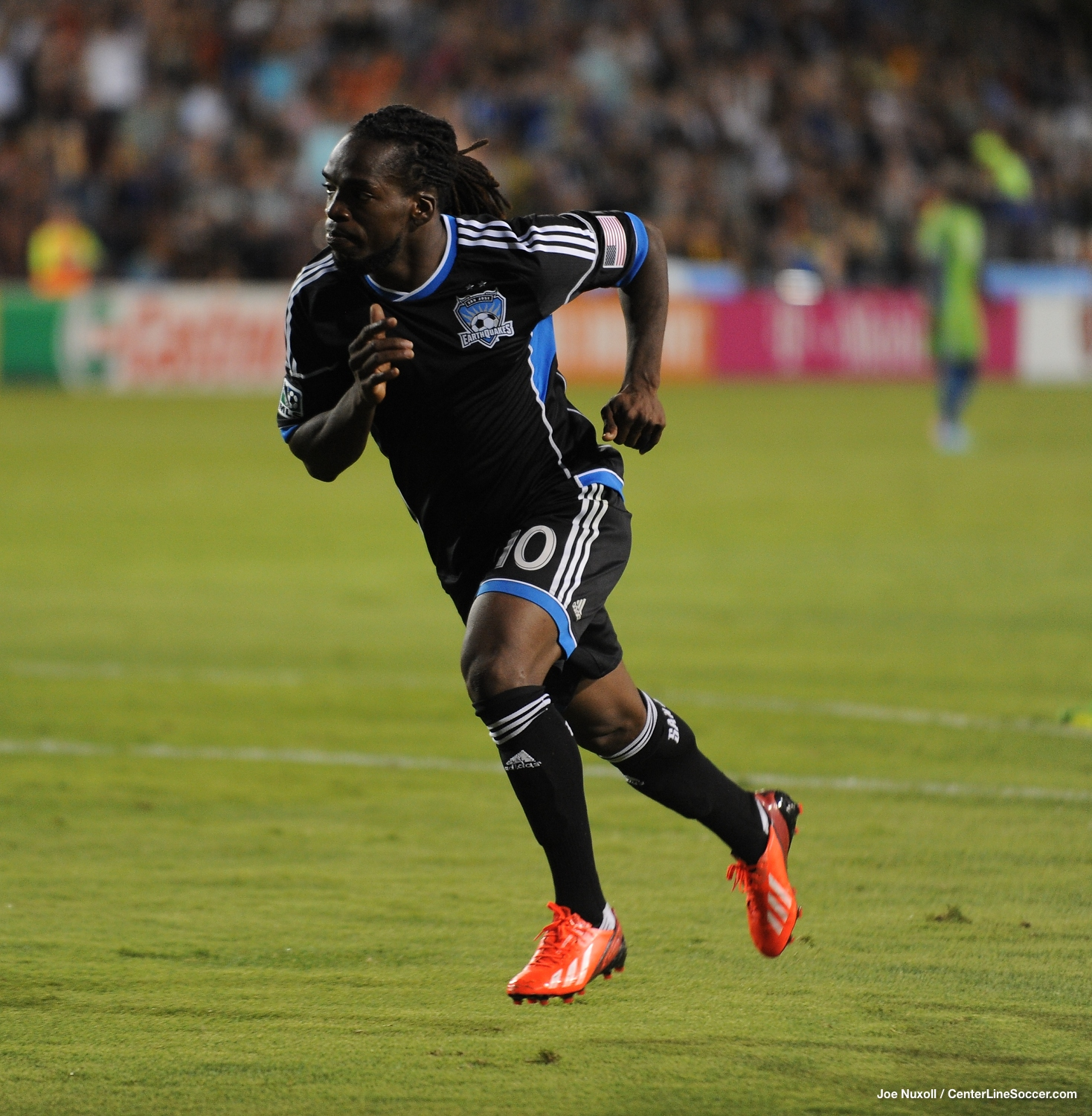
- Martínez in 2013

Personal information
- Full name: Walter Julián Martínez Ramos
- Date of birth: 28 March 1982
- Place of birth: Tegucigalpa, Honduras
- Date of death: 11 August 2019 (aged 37)
- Place of death: New York City, United States
- Positions: Striker; midfielder

Senior career*
Years	Team	Apps	(Gls)
2001–2003	Victoria	53	(9)
2004	Marathón	29	(3)
2005–2006	Vida	8	(3)
2006	Marathón	18	(9)
2007–2008	Beijing Guoan	44	(14)
2009	Alavés	3	(0)
2009–2010	Marathón	36	(12)
2010–2011	Beijing Guoan	37	(13)
2012	Chongqing FC	29	(3)
2013	San Jose Earthquakes	15	(2)
2014–2015	Club Xelajú MC	18	(3)
2015	Marathón	16	(2)
2015	FAS	20	(6)
2016–2017	Marathón		

International career
2002–2011	Honduras	49	(12)
- * Club domestic league appearances and goals

Walter Julián Martínez Ramos (28 March 1982 – 11 August 2019) was a Honduran professional footballer who played as a striker.

== Club career ==
Martínez started his professional career at Victoria and made his debut on 25 November 2000 against Deportes Savio. He also played for Vida in La Ceiba, and Marathón in San Pedro Sula.

On 27 January 2007, Diario Deportivo Diez confirmed that he would play for Beijing Guoan of China, where he would play four seasons over two separate spells. In July 2010 he was presented there for his second stint.

In January 2011, Martínez became the 11th Honduran footballer in the Spanish league after joining Alavés.

After his contract with Chongqing ended, Martínez had a trial with Major League Soccer side Colorado Rapids in January 2013 and D.C. United in February 2013. On 15 March 2013, Martínez signed with the San Jose Earthquakes.

== International career ==
Martínez made his debut for Honduras in a November 2002 friendly match against Colombia and has earned a total of 49 caps, scoring 12 goals. He has represented his country in 8 FIFA World Cup qualification matches and played in all three of his country's games at the 2010 FIFA World Cup. He also played at the 2003 and 2009 UNCAF Nations Cups and the 2011 Copa Centroamericana, as well as at the 2009 and 2011 CONCACAF Gold Cups.

== Death ==
On 11 August 2019, Martínez died in New York City due to cardiovascular disease.

== Career statistics ==
=== International ===
Appearances and goals by national team and year
National team	Year	Apps	Goals
Honduras	2002	1	0
Honduras	2003	2	0
Honduras	2006	2	1
Honduras	2007	4	2
Honduras	2008	6	2
Honduras	2009	16	4
Honduras	2010	9	1
Honduras	2011	9	2
Total		49	12

Scores and results list Honduras's goal tally first, score column indicates score after each Martínez goal.

List of international goals scored by Walter Martínez
No.	Date	Venue	Opponent	Score	Result	Competition	Ref.
1	10 October 2006	Herndon Stadium, Atlanta, United States	Guatemala	2–0	2–1	Friendly	
2	14 October 2007	Estadio Nacional Chelato Uclés, Tegucigalpa, Honduras	Panama	1–0	1–0	Friendly	
3	17 November 2007	Hard Rock Stadium, Miami Gardens, United States	Guatemala	1–0	1–0	Friendly	
4	7 June 2008	Estadio Nilmo Edwards, La Ceiba, Honduras	Haiti	1–0	3–1	Friendly	
5	11 October 2008	Estadio Olímpico Metropolitano, San Pedro Sula, Honduras	Canada	1–0	3–1	2010 FIFA World Cup qualification	
6	22 January 2009	Estadio Nacional Chelato Uclés, Tegucigalpa, Honduras	Belize	2–0	2–1	2009 UNCAF Nations Cup	
7	24 January 2009	Estadio Nacional Chelato Uclés, Tegucigalpa, Honduras	Nicaragua	4–1	4–1	2009 UNCAF Nations Cup	
8	11 July 2009	Gillette Stadium, Foxborough, United States	Grenada	1–0	4–0	2009 CONCACAF Gold Cup	
9	18 July 2009	Lincoln Financial Field, Philadelphia, United States	Canada	1–0	1–0	2009 CONCACAF Gold Cup	
10	9 October 2010	North Harbour Stadium, North Shore City, New Zealand	New Zealand	1–1	1–1	Friendly	
11	23 January 2011	Estadio Rommel Fernández, Panama City, Panama	Costa Rica	1–0	2–1	2011 Copa Centroamericana	
12	10 June 2011	FIU Stadium, Miami, United States	Grenada	6–1	7–1	2011 CONCACAF Gold Cup	

== Honors ==
- CONCACAF Gold Cup All-Tournament Team: 2009
- Champion of 2018 Chinese City Football Super League (CFL)
