= Warren Granados =

Costa Rican footballer (born 1981)

Personal information
- Full name: Warren Alberto Granados Quesada
- Date of birth: 6 December 1981 (age 44)
- Place of birth: San Ramón, Costa Rica
- Height: 1.76 m (5 ft 9 in)
- Position: Midfielder

Senior career*
Years	Team	Apps	(Gls)
1998–2001	Ramonense		
2002–2004	Alajuelense		
2004	→ Puntarenas (loan)		
2005	→ Cartaginés (loan)		
2005	→ Ramonense (loan)	17	(0)
2008–2012	Ramonense		

International career^{‡}
2009	Costa Rica	6	(2)
- * Club domestic league appearances and goals ‡ National team caps and goals as of 1 June 2014

Warren Alberto Granados Quesada (born 6 December 1981) is a Costa Rican former professional footballer who played as a midfielder.

== Club career ==
Granados made his professional debut for second division Ramonense aged 16 and joined Alajuelense ahead of the 2002 season, signing for 4 years. In summer 2004 he moved to Puntarenas and in May 2005 he was on the losing end, missing out on the Clausura season final as his side Cartaginés lost to Saprissa.

In July 2008, Granados returned to playing for Ramonense after quitting football to pick up computer studies and work outside football.

== International career ==
Granados has played at the 2001 FIFA World Youth Championship and competed for Costa Rica at the 2004 Summer Olympics.

He made his senior debut for Costa Rica in a May 2009 friendly match against Venezuela and earned a total of 6 caps, including four appearances at the 2009 CONCACAF Gold Cup finals, scoring 2 goals.

His final international was a July 2009 CONCACAF Gold Cup match against Mexico.

=== International goals ===
Scores and results list Costa Rica's goal tally first.

N.	Date	Venue	Opponent	Score	Result	Competition
1.	19 May 2009	Estadio Polideportivo de Pueblo Nuevo, San Cristóbal, Venezuela	Venezuela	1–1	1–1	Friendly match
2.	3 July 2009	Home Depot Center, Carson, United States	El Salvador	1–1	1–2	2009 CONCACAF Gold Cup
