= 2009 CONCACAF Gold Cup squads =

Below are the player squads of the teams participating in the 2009 CONCACAF Gold Cup. All rosters consist of 23 players (with 3 goalkeepers), except for the United States, which was given 7 extra roster slots due to recent participation in the 2009 FIFA Confederations Cup.

The statistics in the tables below represent player profiles as of the beginning of the tournament. See individual player articles for current statistics.

== Group A ==
=== Canada ===
Head coach: (Trinidad and Tobago) Stephen Hart

| No. | Pos. | Player | Date of birth (age) | Caps | Goals | Club |
|---|---|---|---|---|---|---|
| 1 | GK | Greg Sutton | 19 April 1977 (aged 32) | 12 | 0 | (Canadian Soccer Association) Toronto FC |
| 2 | DF | Adrian Cann | 19 September 1980 (aged 28) | 6 | 0 | (Danish Football Association) Esbjerg fB |
| 3 | DF | Michał Klukowski | 27 May 1981 (aged 28) | 21 | 0 | (Royal Belgian Football Association) Club Brugge |
| 4 | DF | André Hainault | 17 June 1986 (aged 23) | 14 | 1 | (United States Soccer Federation) Houston Dynamo |
| 5 | DF | Kevin McKenna | 22 January 1980 (aged 29) | 40 | 9 | (German Football Association) 1. FC Köln |
| 6 | MF | Julian de Guzman | 25 March 1981 (aged 28) | 37 | 5 | (Royal Spanish Football Federation) Deportivo La Coruña |
| 7 | DF | Paul Stalteri (Captain) | 18 October 1977 (aged 31) | 74 | 7 | (German Football Association) Borussia Mönchengladbach |
| 8 | DF | Marcel de Jong | 15 October 1986 (aged 22) | 8 | 0 | (Royal Dutch Football Association) Roda JC |
| 9 | FW | Ali Gerba | 4 September 1981 (aged 27) | 24 | 14 | (Canadian Soccer Association) Toronto FC |
| 10 | MF | Will Johnson | 21 January 1987 (aged 22) | 6 | 0 | (United States Soccer Federation) Real Salt Lake |
| 11 | DF | Richard Hastings | 18 May 1977 (aged 32) | 55 | 1 | (Scottish Football Association) Inverness Caledonian Thistle |
| 12 | MF | Issey Nakajima-Farran | 16 May 1984 (aged 25) | 18 | 1 | (Danish Football Association) Nordsjælland |
| 13 | MF | Atiba Hutchinson | 8 February 1983 (aged 26) | 41 | 4 | (Danish Football Association) Copenhagen |
| 14 | DF | Dejan Jakovic | 16 July 1985 (aged 23) | 2 | 0 | (United States Soccer Federation) D.C. United |
| 15 | MF | Josh Simpson | 15 May 1983 (aged 26) | 20 | 0 | (German Football Association) 1. FC Kaiserslautern |
| 16 | FW | Simeon Jackson | 28 March 1987 (aged 22) | 2 | 1 | (The Football Association) Gillingham |
| 17 | MF | Jaime Peters | 4 May 1987 (aged 22) | 17 | 1 | (The Football Association) Ipswich Town |
| 18 | GK | Josh Wagenaar | 26 February 1985 (aged 24) | 2 | 0 | (The Football Association) Yeovil Town |
| 19 | MF | Kevin Harmse | 17 June 1984 (aged 25) | 9 | 0 | (United States Soccer Federation) Chivas USA |
| 20 | MF | Patrice Bernier | 23 September 1979 (aged 29) | 38 | 1 | (Danish Football Association) Nordsjælland |
| 21 | DF | Chris Pozniak | 10 January 1981 (aged 28) | 24 | 0 | (Canadian Soccer Association) Vancouver Whitecaps FC |
| 22 | GK | Kyriakos Stamatopoulos | 28 August 1979 (aged 29) | 5 | 0 | (Norwegian Football Federation) Lyn Oslo |
| 23 | FW | Charles Gbeke | 13 March 1978 (aged 31) | 3 | 0 | (Canadian Soccer Association) Vancouver Whitecaps FC |

=== Costa Rica ===
Head coach: (Costa Rica) Rodrigo Kenton

| No. | Pos. | Player | Date of birth (age) | Caps | Goals | Club |
|---|---|---|---|---|---|---|
| 1 | GK | Keylor Navas | 15 December 1986 (aged 22) | 7 | 0 | (Costa Rican Football Federation) Saprissa |
| 2 | DF | Dario Delgado | 14 December 1985 (aged 23) | 1 | 0 | (Costa Rican Football Federation) Puntarenas |
| 3 | DF | Freddy Fernández | 25 February 1974 (aged 35) | 19 | 1 | (Costa Rican Football Federation) Pérez Zeledón |
| 4 | DF | Pablo Salazar | 21 November 1982 (aged 26) | 1 | 0 | (Costa Rican Football Federation) Liberia |
| 5 | MF | Celso Borges | 27 August 1988 (aged 20) | 12 | 5 | (Norwegian Football Federation) Fredrikstad |
| 6 | MF | Cristian Oviedo | 25 August 1978 (aged 30) | 7 | 0 | (Costa Rican Football Federation) L.D. Alajuelense |
| 7 | FW | Pablo Brenes | 4 August 1982 (aged 26) | 8 | 0 | (Costa Rican Football Federation) Brujas |
| 8 | MF | Esteban Granados | 25 October 1986 (aged 22) | 5 | 0 | (Costa Rican Football Federation) Cartaginés |
| 9 | FW | Álvaro Saborío | 25 March 1982 (aged 27) | 48 | 15 | (Swiss Football Association) Sion |
| 10 | MF | Walter Centeno (Captain) | 6 October 1974 (aged 34) | 131 | 22 | (Costa Rican Football Federation) Saprissa |
| 11 | FW | Andy Herron | 2 March 1978 (aged 31) | 20 | 5 | (Costa Rican Football Federation) CS Herediano |
| 12 | DF | Leonardo González | 21 November 1980 (aged 28) | 60 | 1 | (Costa Rican Football Federation) Liberia |
| 13 | DF | Gonzalo Segares | 13 October 1982 (aged 26) | 12 | 0 | (United States Soccer Federation) Chicago Fire |
| 14 | FW | Armando Alonso | 21 March 1984 (aged 25) | 13 | 3 | (Costa Rican Football Federation) Saprissa |
| 15 | DF | Harold Wallace | 7 September 1975 (aged 33) | 91 | 3 | (Costa Rican Football Federation) Liberia |
| 16 | DF | Esteban Sirias | 3 October 1980 (aged 28) | 4 | 0 | (Costa Rican Football Federation) Liberia |
| 17 | DF | Pablo Herrera | 14 February 1987 (aged 22) | 13 | 2 | (Costa Rican Football Federation) L.D. Alajuelense |
| 18 | GK | Ricardo González | 6 March 1974 (aged 35) | 38 | 0 | (Costa Rican Football Federation) CS Herediano |
| 19 | MF | Warren Granados | 6 December 1981 (aged 27) | 2 | 1 | (Costa Rican Football Federation) AD Ramonense |
| 20 | DF | Dennis Marshall | 9 August 1985 (aged 23) | 1 | 0 | (Costa Rican Football Federation) CS Herediano |
| 21 | FW | Froylán Ledezma | 2 January 1978 (aged 31) | 9 | 3 | (Austrian Football Association) Trenkwalder Admira |
| 22 | MF | Josimar Arias | 24 September 1986 (aged 22) | 2 | 0 | (Costa Rican Football Federation) Brujas |
| 23 | GK | Daniel Cambronero | 8 January 1986 (aged 23) | 1 | 0 | (Costa Rican Football Federation) Universidad de Costa Rica |

=== El Salvador ===
Head coach: (Mexico) Carlos de los Cobos

| No. | Pos. | Player | Date of birth (age) | Caps | Goals | Club |
|---|---|---|---|---|---|---|
| 1 | GK | Miguel Montes | 12 February 1980 (aged 29) | 25 | 0 | (Salvadoran Football Federation) Nejapa |
| 2 | DF | Alexander Escobar | 4 April 1984 (aged 25) | 28 | 0 | (Salvadoran Football Federation) Isidro Metapán |
| 3 | DF | Marvin González | 17 April 1982 (aged 27) | 60 | 1 | (Salvadoran Football Federation) FAS |
| 4 | DF | José Henríquez | 24 May 1987 (aged 22) | 13 | 0 | (Salvadoran Football Federation) FAS |
| 5 | DF | Luis Hernández | 9 February 1985 (aged 24) | 19 | 0 | (Salvadoran Football Federation) Águila |
| 6 | MF | Julio Martínez | 8 July 1985 (aged 23) | 8 | 1 | (Salvadoran Football Federation) Alianza |
| 7 | MF | Ramón Sánchez (Captain) | 25 May 1982 (aged 27) | 49 | 2 | (Salvadoran Football Federation) Alianza |
| 8 | MF | Osael Romero | 18 April 1986 (aged 23) | 28 | 6 | (Salvadoran Football Federation) Vista Hermosa |
| 9 | FW | Rudis Corrales | 6 December 1979 (aged 29) | 52 | 13 | (Salvadoran Football Federation) Águila |
| 10 | FW | Eliseo Quintanilla | 5 February 1983 (aged 26) | 38 | 13 | (Salvadoran Football Federation) Águila |
| 11 | FW | Rodolfo Zelaya | 3 July 1988 (aged 21) | 18 | 4 | (Salvadoran Football Federation) Alianza |
| 12 | DF | Manuel Salazar | 23 January 1986 (aged 23) | 35 | 0 | (Salvadoran Football Federation) Luís Ángel Firpo |
| 13 | DF | Deris Umanzor | 7 January 1980 (aged 29) | 15 | 0 | (Salvadoran Football Federation) Águila |
| 14 | MF | Dennis Alas | 10 January 1985 (aged 24) | 41 | 2 | (Salvadoran Football Federation) Luís Ángel Firpo |
| 15 | DF | Alfredo Pacheco | 1 December 1982 (aged 26) | 69 | 6 | (United States Soccer Federation) New York Red Bulls |
| 16 | MF | Óscar Jiménez | 18 April 1979 (aged 30) | 23 | 0 | (Salvadoran Football Federation) Alianza |
| 17 | MF | Cristian Castillo | 27 July 1984 (aged 24) | 24 | 2 | (Salvadoran Football Federation) Alianza |
| 18 | MF | Salvador Coreas | 29 September 1984 (aged 24) | 29 | 0 | (Salvadoran Football Federation) Vista Hermosa |
| 19 | FW | Williams Reyes | 30 October 1976 (aged 32) | 11 | 0 | (Salvadoran Football Federation) Isidro Metapán |
| 20 | DF | Víctor Turcios | 13 April 1988 (aged 21) | 7 | 1 | (Salvadoran Football Federation) Luís Ángel Firpo |
| 21 | MF | William Torres | 27 October 1976 (aged 32) | 22 | 2 | (Salvadoran Football Federation) Águila |
| 22 | GK | Benji Villalobos | 15 July 1988 (aged 20) | 0 | 0 | (Salvadoran Football Federation) Águila |
| 23 | FW | Herber Barrera | 17 March 1981 (aged 28) | 0 | 0 | (Salvadoran Football Federation) Luís Ángel Firpo |

=== Jamaica ===
Head coach: (Jamaica) Theodore Whitmore

| No. | Pos. | Player | Date of birth (age) | Caps | Goals | Club |
|---|---|---|---|---|---|---|
| 1 | GK | Donovan Ricketts | 7 June 1977 (aged 32) | 80 | 0 | (United States Soccer Federation) Los Angeles Galaxy |
| 2 | DF | Eric Vernon | 4 July 1987 (aged 21) | 11 | 2 | (Jamaica Football Federation) Portmore United |
| 3 | DF | Damion Stewart | 18 August 1980 (aged 28) | 51 | 3 | (The Football Association) Q.P.R. |
| 4 | DF | Claude Davis | 6 March 1979 (aged 30) | 63 | 2 | (The Football Association) Derby County |
| 5 | DF | Ian Goodison | 21 November 1972 (aged 36) | 113 | 9 | (The Football Association) Tranmere Rovers |
| 7 | MF | Jason Morrison | 27 June 1984 (aged 25) | 16 | 1 | (Hungarian Football Federation) Ferencvárosi TC |
| 8 | MF | Jamal Campbell-Ryce | 6 April 1983 (aged 26) | 15 | 0 | (The Football Association) Barnsley |
| 9 | MF | Shavar Thomas | 29 January 1981 (aged 28) | 12 | 0 | (United States Soccer Federation) Chivas USA |
| 10 | FW | Ricardo Fuller | 31 October 1979 (aged 29) | 49 | 5 | (The Football Association) Stoke City |
| 11 | FW | Luton Shelton | 11 November 1985 (aged 23) | 44 | 27 | (Norwegian Football Federation) Vålerenga |
| 12 | MF | Demar Phillips | 23 September 1983 (aged 25) | 32 | 5 | (Norwegian Football Federation) Aalesunds |
| 13 | GK | Dwayne Kerr | 16 January 1987 (aged 22) | 4 | 0 | (Jamaica Football Federation) Portmore United |
| 14 | DF | Tyrone Marshall | 12 November 1974 (aged 34) | 78 | 5 | (United States Soccer Federation) Seattle Sounders FC |
| 15 | DF | Ricardo Gardner (Captain) | 25 September 1978 (aged 30) | 96 | 9 | (The Football Association) Bolton Wanderers |
| 16 | MF | Jermaine Johnson | 25 June 1980 (aged 29) | 58 | 9 | (The Football Association) Sheffield Wednesday |
| 17 | MF | Rodolph Austin | 1 June 1985 (aged 24) | 24 | 2 | (Norwegian Football Federation) SK Brann |
| 18 | MF | Rafe Wolfe | 19 December 1985 (aged 23) | 8 | 1 | (Hungarian Football Federation) Ferencvárosi TC |
| 19 | FW | Nicholas Addlery | 7 December 1981 (aged 27) | 3 | 1 | (Puerto Rican Football Federation) Puerto Rico Islanders |
| 20 | MF | Oneil Thompson | 11 August 1983 (aged 25) | 17 | 1 | (Norwegian Football Federation) Notodden |
| 21 | GK | Dwayne Miller | 14 July 1987 (aged 21) | 5 | 0 | (Jamaica Football Federation) Harbour View |
| 22 | FW | Omar Cummings | 13 July 1982 (aged 26) | 10 | 2 | (United States Soccer Federation) Colorado Rapids |
| 23 | MF | Dane Richards | 14 December 1983 (aged 25) | 12 | 0 | (United States Soccer Federation) New York Red Bulls |

== Group B ==
=== Grenada ===
Head coach: (England) Tommy Taylor

| No. | Pos. | Player | Date of birth (age) | Caps | Goals | Club |
|---|---|---|---|---|---|---|
| 1 | GK | Andray Baptiste | 15 April 1977 (aged 32) | 7 | 0 | (The Football Association) Harrow Borough |
| 4 | MF | Cassim Langaigne | 27 February 1980 (aged 29) | 23 | 3 | (Grenada Football Association) Hurricane |
| 5 | DF | Jason James | 25 February 1982 (aged 27) | 9 | 0 | (Grenada Football Association) Hurricane |
| 6 | DF | Marc Marshall | 24 December 1985 (aged 23) | 22 | 0 | (Grenada Football Association) G.B.S.S. FC |
| 7 | MF | Byron Bubb | 17 December 1981 (aged 27) | 9 | 2 | (The Football Association) Slough Town |
| 8 | FW | Delroy Facey | 22 April 1980 (aged 29) | 0 | 0 | (The Football Association) Notts County |
| 9 | MF | Ricky Charles | 19 June 1975 (aged 34) | 32 | 19 | (Trinidad and Tobago Football Association) St. Ann's Rangers |
| 10 | FW | Kitson Bain | 26 May 1982 (aged 27) | 23 | 9 | (Grenada Football Association) Ball Dogs FC |
| 11 | DF | Anthony Modeste (Captain) | 30 August 1975 (aged 33) | 37 | 6 | (Jamaica Football Federation) Portmore United |
| 12 | FW | Marcus Julien | 30 December 1986 (aged 22) | 8 | 1 | (Grenada Football Association) E.S.S. FC |
| 13 | MF | Dwayne Leo | 28 June 1982 (aged 27) | 15 | 0 | (Grenada Football Association) South Stars FC |
| 14 | FW | Denron Daniel | 14 March 1989 (aged 20) | 0 | 0 | (Grenada Football Association) Hard Rock FC |
| 15 | DF | Rimmel Daniel | 28 January 1991 (aged 18) | 0 | 0 | (The Football Association) Gillingham |
| 16 | MF | Kwasi Paul | 2 September 1987 (aged 21) | 2 | 0 | (United States Soccer Federation) Marshalltown CC |
| 17 | MF | Euon Brown | 9 July 1987 (aged 21) | 0 | 0 | (The Football Association) Sevenoaks Town |
| 18 | MF | Lyndon Antoine | 18 March 1986 (aged 23) | 4 | 0 | (The Football Association) Dulwich Hamlet |
| 19 | DF | Michael Mark | 21 April 1986 (aged 23) | 1 | 0 | (Grenada Football Association) E.S.S. FC |
| 20 | FW | Jake Rennie | 30 January 1983 (aged 26) | 2 | 1 | (German Football Association) Bonner SC |
| 23 | DF | Patrick Modeste | 30 September 1976 (aged 32) | 28 | 2 | (Grenada Football Association) Q.P.R. |
| 25 | MF | Shane Rennie | 14 December 1986 (aged 22) | 23 | 5 | (Grenada Football Association) Paradise FC |
| 30 | GK | Desmond Noel | 28 November 1974 (aged 34) | 24 | 0 | (Grenada Football Association) Q.P.R. |
| 33 | GK | Josh Charles | 29 November 1990 (aged 18) | 0 | 0 | (Grenada Football Association) Hard Rock FC |

=== Haiti ===
Head coach: (Colombia) Jairo Ríos

| No. | Pos. | Player | Date of birth (age) | Caps | Goals | Club |
|---|---|---|---|---|---|---|
| 1 | GK | Peterson Occénat | 3 December 1989 (aged 19) | 5 | 0 | (Haitian Football Federation) Aigle Noir |
| 2 | MF | Evens Prophète | 6 January 1986 (aged 23) | 0 | 0 | (Haitian Football Federation) Aigle Noir |
| 3 | DF | Frantz Gilles | 1 January 1977 (aged 32) | 70 | 1 | (Haitian Football Federation) Cavaly |
| 4 | DF | Paulin Jean | 3 May 1986 (aged 23) | 2 | 0 | (Haitian Football Federation) Aigle Noir |
| 5 | DF | Lesley Fellinga | 29 September 1985 (aged 23) | 7 | 0 | (Royal Dutch Football Association) Heerenveen |
| 6 | DF | Frantz Bertin | 30 May 1983 (aged 26) | 16 | 1 | (Hellenic Football Federation) OFI |
| 7 | FW | Brunel Fucien | 26 September 1984 (aged 24) | 28 | 8 | (Haitian Football Federation) Aigle Noir |
| 8 | DF | Judelin Aveska | 21 October 1987 (aged 21) | 7 | 0 | (Argentine Football Association) Independiente Rivadavia |
| 9 | FW | Leonel Saint-Preux | 12 May 1985 (aged 24) | 20 | 2 | (United States Soccer Federation) Minnesota Thunder |
| 10 | FW | Jean-Robens Jerome | 26 April 1987 (aged 22) | 2 | 1 | (Moldovan Football Federation) FC Olimpia Balti |
| 11 | FW | Fabrice Noël | 21 July 1985 (aged 23) | 14 | 1 | (Puerto Rican Football Federation) Puerto Rico Islanders |
| 12 | MF | James Marcelin | 13 June 1986 (aged 23) | 15 | 0 | (Puerto Rican Football Federation) Puerto Rico Islanders |
| 13 | DF | Pierre Bruny (Captain) | 6 April 1972 (aged 37) | 77 | 1 | (Haitian Football Federation) Don Bosco |
| 14 | MF | Mones Chery | 2 December 1981 (aged 27) | 43 | 5 | (Haitian Football Federation) Racing Club Haïtien |
| 15 | DF | Ednerson Raymond | 19 May 1985 (aged 24) | 24 | 1 | (Haitian Football Federation) Baltimore SC |
| 16 | MF | Mackorel Sampeur | 20 March 1986 (aged 23) | 13 | 0 | (Haitian Football Federation) Violette AC |
| 17 | DF | Simson Exumé | 20 October 1989 (aged 19) | 1 | 0 | (Haitian Football Federation) Mirebalais |
| 18 | GK | Dominique Jean-Zérphirin | 30 June 1982 (aged 27) | 4 | 0 | (French Football Federation) ES Fréjus |
| 19 | MF | Vaniel Sirin | 26 October 1989 (aged 19) | 3 | 0 | (Haitian Football Federation) Tempête |
| 20 | FW | Jean Alexandre | 6 December 1985 (aged 23) | 4 | 0 | (United States Soccer Federation) Real Salt Lake |
| 21 | GK | Wings Pierre-Louis | 25 June 1982 (aged 27) | 0 | 0 | (Haitian Football Federation) Mirebalais |
| 22 | MF | Philbert Mercéus | 10 November 1981 (aged 27) | 2 | 1 | (Haitian Football Federation) Don Bosco |
| 23 | FW | Abel Thermeus | 19 January 1983 (aged 26) | 8 | 0 | (Hungarian Football Federation) Debreceni |

=== Honduras ===
Head coach: (Colombia) Reynaldo Rueda

| No. | Pos. | Player | Date of birth (age) | Caps | Goals | Club |
|---|---|---|---|---|---|---|
| 1 | GK | John Bodden | 3 October 1981 (aged 27) | 4 | 0 | (National Autonomous Federation of Football of Honduras) Victoria |
| 2 | DF | Osman Chávez | 29 July 1984 (aged 24) | 15 | 0 | (National Autonomous Federation of Football of Honduras) Platense |
| 3 | DF | David Molina | 14 March 1988 (aged 21) | 0 | 0 | (National Autonomous Federation of Football of Honduras) Motagua |
| 4 | DF | Johnny Palacios | 20 December 1986 (aged 22) | 0 | 0 | (National Autonomous Federation of Football of Honduras) Olimpia |
| 5 | DF | Erick Norales | 11 February 1985 (aged 24) | 7 | 0 | (National Autonomous Federation of Football of Honduras) Marathón |
| 6 | DF | Juan García | 8 March 1988 (aged 21) | 0 | 0 | (National Autonomous Federation of Football of Honduras) Marathón |
| 7 | MF | Rigoberto Padilla | 1 December 1985 (aged 23) | 1 | 0 | (National Autonomous Federation of Football of Honduras) Olimpia |
| 8 | FW | Allan Lalín | 5 January 1981 (aged 28) | 2 | 0 | (National Autonomous Federation of Football of Honduras) Real España |
| 9 | FW | Carlos Mejía | 29 September 1983 (aged 25) | 9 | 1 | (National Autonomous Federation of Football of Honduras) Marathón |
| 10 | FW | Marvin Chávez | 3 November 1983 (aged 25) | 14 | 1 | (National Autonomous Federation of Football of Honduras) Marathón |
| 11 | MF | Mariano Acevedo | 9 January 1983 (aged 26) | 3 | 0 | (National Autonomous Federation of Football of Honduras) Marathón |
| 12 | GK | Ricardo Canales | 30 May 1982 (aged 27) | 0 | 0 | (National Autonomous Federation of Football of Honduras) Motagua |
| 13 | FW | Carlo Costly | 17 July 1982 (aged 26) | 24 | 9 | (Polish Football Association) Bełchatów |
| 14 | DF | Carlos Palacios | 30 January 1982 (aged 27) | 0 | 0 | (National Autonomous Federation of Football of Honduras) Real España |
| 15 | FW | Walter Martínez (Captain) | 28 March 1982 (aged 27) | 22 | 7 | (Royal Spanish Football Federation) Alavés |
| 16 | DF | Nery Medina | 5 August 1981 (aged 27) | 6 | 0 | (National Autonomous Federation of Football of Honduras) Real España |
| 17 | MF | Miguel Castillo | 1 December 1986 (aged 22) | 3 | 0 | (National Autonomous Federation of Football of Honduras) Motagua |
| 18 | MF | Melvin Valladares | 14 July 1984 (aged 24) | 3 | 0 | (National Autonomous Federation of Football of Honduras) Real España |
| 21 | DF | Luis Ramos | 11 April 1985 (aged 24) | 0 | 0 | (Hungarian Football Federation) Spartacus |
| 22 | GK | Donis Escober | 3 February 1980 (aged 29) | 4 | 0 | (National Autonomous Federation of Football of Honduras) Olimpia |
| 23 | MF | Roger Espinoza | 25 October 1986 (aged 22) | 3 | 1 | (United States Soccer Federation) Kansas City Wizards |
| 24 | FW | Georgie Welcome | 9 March 1985 (aged 24) | 2 | 0 | (National Autonomous Federation of Football of Honduras) Motagua |
| 25 | FW | Luis López | 29 August 1986 (aged 22) | 7 | 0 | (Mexican Football Federation) Durango |

=== United States ===
Head coach: (United States) Bob Bradley

| No. | Pos. | Player | Date of birth (age) | Caps | Goals | Club |
|---|---|---|---|---|---|---|
| 1 | GK | Troy Perkins | 20 July 1981 (aged 27) | 1 | 0 | (Norwegian Football Federation) Vålerenga |
| 2 | DF | Heath Pearce | 13 August 1984 (aged 24) | 23 | 0 | (German Football Association) Hansa Rostock |
| 3 | DF | Clarence Goodson | 17 May 1982 (aged 27) | 2 | 0 | (Norwegian Football Federation) IK Start |
| 4 | DF | Chad Marshall | 22 August 1984 (aged 24) | 4 | 1 | (United States Soccer Federation) Columbus Crew |
| 5 | MF | Kyle Beckerman | 23 April 1982 (aged 27) | 3 | 0 | (United States Soccer Federation) Real Salt Lake |
| 6 | DF | Steve Cherundolo (Captain) | 19 February 1979 (aged 30) | 51 | 2 | (German Football Association) Hannover 96 |
| 7 | MF | Robbie Rogers | 12 May 1987 (aged 22) | 1 | 0 | (United States Soccer Federation) Columbus Crew |
| 8 | MF | Logan Pause | 22 August 1981 (aged 27) | 0 | 0 | (United States Soccer Federation) Chicago Fire |
| 9 | FW | Charlie Davies | 25 June 1986 (aged 23) | 10 | 2 | (Swedish Football Association) Hammarby IF |
| 10 | MF | Stuart Holden | 1 August 1985 (aged 23) | 0 | 0 | (United States Soccer Federation) Houston Dynamo |
| 11 | FW | Brian Ching | 24 May 1978 (aged 31) | 36 | 9 | (United States Soccer Federation) Houston Dynamo |
| 12 | DF | Jimmy Conrad | 12 February 1977 (aged 32) | 24 | 1 | (United States Soccer Federation) Kansas City Wizards |
| 13 | MF | Colin Clark | 11 April 1984 (aged 25) | 0 | 0 | (United States Soccer Federation) Colorado Rapids |
| 14 | DF | Michael Parkhurst | 24 January 1984 (aged 25) | 5 | 0 | (Danish Football Association) Nordsjælland |
| 15 | MF | Sam Cronin | 12 December 1986 (aged 22) | 0 | 0 | (Canadian Soccer Association) Toronto FC |
| 16 | DF | Jay Heaps | 2 August 1976 (aged 32) | 0 | 0 | (United States Soccer Federation) New England Revolution |
| 17 | FW | Kenny Cooper | 21 October 1984 (aged 24) | 4 | 2 | (United States Soccer Federation) FC Dallas |
| 18 | GK | Luis Robles | 11 May 1984 (aged 25) | 0 | 0 | (German Football Association) 1. FC Kaiserslautern |
| 19 | MF | Freddy Adu | 2 June 1989 (aged 20) | 13 | 1 | (Portuguese Football Federation) Benfica |
| 20 | FW | Santino Quaranta | 14 October 1984 (aged 24) | 11 | 0 | (United States Soccer Federation) D.C. United |
| 21 | MF | Brad Evans | 20 April 1985 (aged 24) | 0 | 0 | (United States Soccer Federation) Seattle Sounders FC |
| 22 | MF | Davy Arnaud | 22 June 1980 (aged 29) | 2 | 0 | (United States Soccer Federation) Kansas City Wizards |
| 23 | GK | Jon Busch | 18 August 1976 (aged 32) | 1 | 0 | (United States Soccer Federation) Chicago Fire |
| 25 | MF | Benny Feilhaber | 19 January 1985 (aged 24) | 22 | 2 | (Danish Football Association) AGF |

== Group C ==
=== Guadeloupe ===
Head coach: (France) Roger Salnot

| No. | Pos. | Player | Date of birth (age) | Caps | Goals | Club |
|---|---|---|---|---|---|---|
| 1 | GK | Yohan Bus | 12 February 1986 (aged 23) | 0 | 0 | (French Football Federation) Saint Louis Neuweg |
| 2 | DF | Méddy Lina | 11 January 1986 (aged 23) | 6 | 0 | (Ligue guadeloupéenne de football) Evolucas |
| 3 | DF | Mickaël Tacalfred | 23 April 1981 (aged 28) | 5 | 0 | (French Football Federation) Reims |
| 4 | DF | Cédric Avinel | 11 September 1986 (aged 22) | 5 | 0 | (French Football Federation) Gueugnon |
| 5 | DF | Eddy Viator | 2 June 1982 (aged 27) | 0 | 0 | (French Football Federation) Amiens |
| 6 | DF | Alain Vertot | 14 November 1972 (aged 36) | 40 | 2 | (Ligue guadeloupéenne de football) Morne-à-l'Eau |
| 7 | FW | Loïc Loval | 28 September 1981 (aged 27) | 7 | 2 | (Royal Dutch Football Association) Utrecht |
| 8 | MF | Stéphane Auvray (Captain) | 4 September 1981 (aged 27) | 10 | 0 | (French Football Federation) Nîmes |
| 9 | FW | Ludovic Gotin | 25 July 1985 (aged 23) | 8 | 4 | (Ligue guadeloupéenne de football) Moulien |
| 10 | MF | Aurélien Capoue | 28 February 1982 (aged 27) | 4 | 0 | (French Football Federation) Nantes |
| 11 | FW | Mickaël Antoine-Curier | 5 March 1983 (aged 26) | 8 | 6 | (Scottish Football Association) Dundee |
| 12 | MF | David Fleurival | 19 February 1984 (aged 25) | 12 | 1 | (French Football Federation) Châteauroux |
| 13 | MF | Jean-Luc Lambourde | 10 April 1980 (aged 29) | 31 | 7 | (Ligue guadeloupéenne de football) Amical Club |
| 14 | DF | Willy Laurence | 4 March 1984 (aged 25) | 9 | 0 | (Ligue guadeloupéenne de football) Morne-à-l'Eau |
| 15 | DF | Miguel Comminges | 16 March 1982 (aged 27) | 7 | 0 | (Football Association of Wales) Cardiff City |
| 16 | MF | Thomas Gamiette | 21 June 1986 (aged 23) | 0 | 0 | (French Football Federation) Reims |
| 17 | MF | Lérry Hanany | 1 October 1982 (aged 26) | 22 | 4 | (Ligue guadeloupéenne de football) La Gauloise |
| 18 | GK | Marius Fausta | 28 April 1973 (aged 36) | 9 | 0 | (Ligue guadeloupéenne de football) Evolucas |
| 19 | MF | Grégory Gendrey | 10 July 1986 (aged 22) | 9 | 3 | (Ligue guadeloupéenne de football) Evolucas |
| 20 | MF | Larry Clavier | 9 January 1981 (aged 28) | 0 | 0 | (French Football Federation) Racing Paris |
| 21 | GK | Cédric Céligny | 18 April 1981 (aged 28) | 0 | 0 | (Ligue guadeloupéenne de football) Les Abymes |
| 22 | DF | Fabien Jérôme | 12 February 1986 (aged 23) | 5 | 1 | (Ligue guadeloupéenne de football) Evolucas |
| 23 | FW | Alexandre Alphonse | 17 June 1982 (aged 27) | 0 | 0 | (Swiss Football Association) Zürich |

=== Mexico ===
Head coach: (Mexico) Javier Aguirre

| No. | Pos. | Player | Date of birth (age) | Caps | Goals | Club |
|---|---|---|---|---|---|---|
| 1 | GK | Guillermo Ochoa | 13 July 1985 (aged 23) | 22 | 0 | (Mexican Football Federation) América |
| 2 | DF | Jonny Magallón | 21 November 1981 (aged 27) | 35 | 3 | (Mexican Football Federation) Guadalajara |
| 3 | DF | Ismael Rodríguez | 10 January 1981 (aged 28) | 2 | 0 | (Mexican Football Federation) América |
| 4 | DF | Edgar Dueñas | 5 March 1983 (aged 26) | 4 | 0 | (Mexican Football Federation) Toluca |
| 5 | DF | Fausto Pinto | 8 August 1983 (aged 25) | 18 | 0 | (Mexican Football Federation) Cruz Azul |
| 6 | MF | Gerardo Torrado (Captain) | 30 April 1979 (aged 30) | 94 | 4 | (Mexican Football Federation) Cruz Azul |
| 7 | FW | Alberto Medina | 29 May 1983 (aged 26) | 41 | 2 | (Mexican Football Federation) Guadalajara |
| 8 | MF | Israel Castro | 20 December 1980 (aged 28) | 13 | 0 | (Mexican Football Federation) UNAM |
| 9 | FW | Omar Bravo | 4 March 1980 (aged 29) | 61 | 15 | (Royal Spanish Football Federation) Deportivo La Coruña |
| 10 | FW | Guillermo Franco | 3 November 1976 (aged 32) | 14 | 3 | (The Football Association) West Ham United |
| 11 | FW | Carlos Vela | 1 March 1989 (aged 20) | 16 | 5 | (The Football Association) Arsenal |
| 12 | GK | José de Jesús Corona | 26 January 1981 (aged 28) | 8 | 0 | (Mexican Football Federation) Estudiantes Tecos |
| 13 | MF | Pablo Barrera | 21 June 1987 (aged 22) | 3 | 0 | (Mexican Football Federation) UNAM |
| 14 | FW | Miguel Sabah | 14 November 1979 (aged 29) | 3 | 0 | (Mexican Football Federation) Morelia |
| 15 | DF | José Antonio Castro | 11 August 1980 (aged 28) | 23 | 0 | (Mexican Football Federation) América |
| 16 | FW | Carlos Esquivel | 10 April 1982 (aged 27) | 4 | 0 | (Mexican Football Federation) Toluca |
| 17 | FW | Giovani Dos Santos | 11 May 1989 (aged 20) | 13 | 2 | (The Football Association) Tottenham Hotspur |
| 18 | FW | José María Cárdenas | 13 June 1984 (aged 25) | 2 | 1 | (Mexican Football Federation) Pachuca |
| 19 | MF | Luis Miguel Noriega | 17 April 1985 (aged 24) | 2 | 0 | (Mexican Football Federation) Puebla |
| 20 | MF | Israel Martínez | 14 March 1981 (aged 28) | 6 | 0 | (Mexican Football Federation) San Luis |
| 21 | DF | Juan Carlos Valenzuela | 15 May 1984 (aged 25) | 3 | 0 | (Mexican Football Federation) América |
| 22 | DF | Efraín Juárez | 22 February 1988 (aged 21) | 1 | 0 | (Mexican Football Federation) UNAM |
| 23 | GK | Óscar Pérez | 1 February 1973 (aged 36) | 48 | 0 | (Mexican Football Federation) UANL |

=== Nicaragua ===
Head coach: (Nicaragua) Ramón Otoniel Olivas

| No. | Pos. | Player | Date of birth (age) | Caps | Goals | Club |
|---|---|---|---|---|---|---|
| 1 | GK | Denis Espinoza | 25 August 1983 (aged 25) | 3 | 0 | (Nicaraguan Football Federation) Ferretti |
| 2 | DF | Roger Mejía | 30 April 1984 (aged 25) | 0 | 0 | (Nicaraguan Football Federation) América Managua |
| 3 | DF | Silvio Avilés | 11 August 1980 (aged 28) | 3 | 0 | (Nicaraguan Football Federation) Ferretti |
| 4 | MF | Armando Collado | 17 November 1983 (aged 25) | 4 | 0 | (Nicaraguan Football Federation) Real Estelí |
| 5 | DF | Carlos Alonso | 25 August 1979 (aged 29) | 4 | 0 | (Nicaraguan Football Federation) VCP Chinandega |
| 6 | MF | Armando Reyes | 29 July 1981 (aged 27) | 4 | 1 | (Nicaraguan Football Federation) Real Esteli |
| 7 | MF | Juan Barrera | 2 May 1989 (aged 20) | 4 | 1 | (Nicaraguan Football Federation) Ferretti |
| 8 | FW | Rudel Calero | 10 December 1977 (aged 31) | 0 | 0 | (Nicaraguan Football Federation) Real Esteli |
| 9 | FW | Wilber Sánchez | 24 August 1979 (aged 29) | 4 | 0 | (Nicaraguan Football Federation) Ferretti |
| 10 | FW | Samuel Wilson | 4 April 1983 (aged 26) | 4 | 2 | (Nicaraguan Football Federation) Real Estelí |
| 11 | MF | Eliud Zeledón | 24 November 1983 (aged 25) | 4 | 0 | (Nicaraguan Football Federation) Real Estelí |
| 12 | GK | Carlos Mendieta | 3 November 1979 (aged 29) | 1 | 0 | (Nicaraguan Football Federation) Real Estelí |
| 13 | FW | Félix Rodríguez | 27 April 1984 (aged 25) | 4 | 0 | (Nicaraguan Football Federation) Bluefields |
| 14 | MF | Gabriel Avilés | 1 July 1989 (aged 20) | 0 | 0 | (Nicaraguan Football Federation) América |
| 15 | MF | Franklin López | 16 August 1982 (aged 26) | 4 | 0 | (Nicaraguan Football Federation) Real Estelí |
| 16 | DF | Marvin Molina | 21 December 1981 (aged 27) | 2 | 0 | (Nicaraguan Football Federation) Real Estelí |
| 17 | MF | José Carballo | 23 April 1987 (aged 22) | 1 | 0 | (Nicaraguan Football Federation) Ferretti |
| 18 | MF | Marlon Medina | 6 August 1985 (aged 23) | 4 | 1 | (Nicaraguan Football Federation) Real Estelí |
| 19 | MF | Vidal Alonso | 3 November 1980 (aged 28) | 0 | 0 | (Nicaraguan Football Federation) VCP Chinandega |
| 20 | DF | David Solórzano (Captain) | 5 November 1980 (aged 28) | 3 | 0 | (Nicaraguan Football Federation) Diriangén |
| 21 | MF | David Martínez | 10 August 1983 (aged 25) | 0 | 0 | (Nicaraguan Football Federation) Real Estelí |
| 22 | FW | Daniel Reyes | 21 July 1990 (aged 18) | 0 | 0 | (Brazilian Football Confederation) Tigres |

=== Panama ===
Head coach: (England) Gary Stempel

| No. | Pos. | Player | Date of birth (age) | Caps | Goals | Club |
|---|---|---|---|---|---|---|
| 1 | GK | Jaime Penedo | 26 September 1981 (aged 27) | 44 | 0 | (National Football Federation of Guatemala) Municipal |
| 2 | DF | Carlos Rivera | 30 May 1979 (aged 30) | 55 | 2 | (Panamanian Football Federation) San Francisco |
| 3 | DF | Luis Moreno | 19 March 1981 (aged 28) | 61 | 0 | (Panamanian Football Federation) Tauro |
| 4 | MF | José Anthony Torres | 8 August 1972 (aged 36) | 67 | 0 | (National Football Federation of Guatemala) Guastatoya |
| 5 | DF | Román Torres | 20 March 1986 (aged 23) | 25 | 0 | (Colombian Football Federation) La Equidad |
| 6 | MF | Gabriel Gómez | 29 May 1984 (aged 25) | 48 | 1 | (Portuguese Football Federation) Belenenses |
| 7 | FW | Blas Pérez | 13 March 1981 (aged 28) | 29 | 8 | (Mexican Football Federation) Pachuca |
| 8 | MF | Alberto Blanco | 8 January 1978 (aged 31) | 56 | 3 | (Israel Football Association) Maccabi Netanya |
| 9 | FW | José Garcés | 6 May 1981 (aged 28) | 25 | 7 | (Portuguese Football Federation) Académica |
| 10 | MF | Nelson Barahona | 22 November 1987 (aged 21) | 13 | 1 | (Colombian Football Federation) Atlético Huila |
| 11 | MF | Víctor Herrera | 18 April 1980 (aged 29) | 29 | 2 | (Panamanian Football Federation) San Francisco |
| 12 | GK | Óscar McFarlane | 29 November 1980 (aged 28) | 15 | 0 | (Peruvian Football Federation) CNI |
| 13 | DF | Joel Solanilla | 24 December 1983 (aged 25) | 27 | 0 | (Panamanian Football Federation) San Miguelito |
| 14 | DF | Armando Gun | 17 January 1986 (aged 23) | 16 | 0 | (Panamanian Football Federation) Chepo |
| 15 | MF | Ricardo Phillips | 31 January 1975 (aged 34) | 68 | 9 | (Panamanian Football Federation) San Francisco |
| 16 | MF | Manuel Torres | 25 November 1978 (aged 30) | 31 | 1 | (Panamanian Football Federation) San Francisco |
| 17 | FW | Nicolás Muñoz | 21 December 1981 (aged 27) | 8 | 0 | (Salvadoran Football Federation) Vista Hermosa |
| 18 | FW | Luis Tejada | 28 March 1982 (aged 27) | 40 | 16 | (Colombian Football Federation) Millonarios |
| 19 | FW | Orlando Rodríguez | 9 August 1984 (aged 24) | 13 | 0 | (Panamanian Football Federation) Árabe Unido |
| 20 | MF | Rolando Escobar | 24 October 1981 (aged 27) | 21 | 1 | (Venezuelan Football Federation) Caracas |
| 21 | MF | Amílcar Henríquez | 2 August 1983 (aged 25) | 28 | 0 | (Colombian Football Federation) Atlético Huila |
| 22 | GK | José Calderón | 14 August 1985 (aged 23) | 4 | 0 | (Panamanian Football Federation) Chepo |
| 23 | DF | Felipe Baloy (Captain) | 24 February 1981 (aged 28) | 40 | 2 | (Mexican Football Federation) Monterrey |
