= 2010 Caribbean Cup squads =

Football tournament squads

The 2010 Caribbean Championship is an international football tournament that will be held in Martinique from November 26 – December 5. The 8 national teams involved in the tournament are required to register a squad of 20 players; only players in these squads are eligible to take part in the tournament.

Before announcing their final squad for the tournament, teams are required to name a preliminary squad of 30 players by 16 November 2010, 10 days before the start of the tournament.

Number of caps, goals, players' club teams and players' age as of 26 November 2010. Note: Caps and goals may be incomplete for certain players, therefore being inaccurate.

== Group H ==
=== Trinidad and Tobago ===
Coach: (Trinidad and Tobago) Russell Latapy

No.	Pos.	Player	Date of birth (age)	Caps	Goals	Club
1	GK	Jan-Michael Williams	26 October 1984 (aged 26)	35	0	(Trinidad and Tobago Football Association) W Connection
2	MF	Clyde Leon (c)	8 December 1983 (aged 26)	34	1	(Trinidad and Tobago Football Association) W Connection
3	DF	Yohance Marshall	22 January 1986 (aged 24)	3	0	(United States Soccer Federation) L.A. Galaxy
4	MF	Kerry Baptiste	1 December 1981 (aged 28)	49	11	(Trinidad and Tobago Football Association) Joe Public
5	DF	Kern Cupid	11 April 1984 (aged 26)	20	0	(Trinidad and Tobago Football Association) W Connection
6	DF	Daneil Cyrus	15 December 1990 (aged 19)	10	0	(Trinidad and Tobago Football Association) Caledonia AIA
7	MF	Hughton Hector	16 October 1984 (aged 26)	12	4	(Trinidad and Tobago Football Association) W Connection
8	FW	Trent Noel	14 January 1976 (aged 34)	33	0	(Trinidad and Tobago Football Association) Joe Public
9	FW	Devon Jorsling	27 December 1983 (aged 26)	21	13	(Trinidad and Tobago Football Association) Defence Force
10	MF	Kevin Molino	17 June 1990 (aged 20)	2	0	(Trinidad and Tobago Football Association) Ma Pau
11	MF	Anthony Wolfe	23 December 1983 (aged 26)	29	3	(Trinidad and Tobago Football Association) Ma Pau
12	DF	Julius James	9 July 1984 (aged 26)	8	0	(United States Soccer Federation) D.C. United
13	FW	Cornell Glen	21 October 1981 (aged 29)	62	23	Unattached
14	DF	Joevin Jones	3 August 1991 (aged 19)	8	0	(Trinidad and Tobago Football Association) W Connection
15	FW	Lester Peltier	13 September 1988 (aged 22)	8	1	(Trinidad and Tobago Football Association) Ma Pau
16	FW	Kendall Jagdeosingh	30 May 1986 (aged 24)	5	0	(Puerto Rican Football Federation) Puerto Rico Islanders
17	FW	Jamal Gay	9 February 1989 (aged 21)	9	2	(Turkish Football Federation) Dardanel Spor
18	DF	Densill Theobald	27 June 1982 (aged 28)	72	2	(Trinidad and Tobago Football Association) Caledonia AIA
19	MF	Keon Daniel	16 January 1984 (aged 26)	41	7	(Puerto Rican Football Federation) Puerto Rico Islanders
20	GK	Marvin Phillip	1 August 1984 (aged 26)	27	0	(Trinidad and Tobago Football Association) W Connection

Note: Caps and goals may be incomplete for certain players, therefore being inaccurate.

=== Cuba ===
Coach: (Cuba) Raúl González Triana

No.	Pos.	Player	Date of birth (age)	Caps	Goals	Club
1	GK	Odelín Molina	3 August 1974 (aged 36)	68	0	(Football Association of Cuba) Villa Clara
2	DF	Carlos Francisco	22 May 1990 (aged 20)	9	0	(Football Association of Cuba) Santiago de Cuba
3	DF	Yénier Márquez	3 January 1979 (aged 31)	81	9	(Football Association of Cuba) Villa Clara
4	DF	Hánier Dranguet	2 September 1982 (aged 28)	0	0	(Football Association of Cuba) Guantánamo
5	DF	Jorge Luís Clavelo	8 August 1982 (aged 28)	26	2	(Football Association of Cuba) Villa Clara
6	DF	Yoel Colomé	15 October 1982 (aged 28)	0	0	(Football Association of Cuba) Ciudad de La Habana
7	MF	Marcel Hernández	11 July 1989 (aged 21)	4	1	(Football Association of Cuba) Ciudad de La Habana
8	MF	Jaime Colomé (c)	30 June 1979 (aged 31)	54	9	(Football Association of Cuba) Ciudad de La Habana
9	FW	Alain Cervantes	17 November 1983 (aged 27)	52	8	(Football Association of Cuba) Ciego de Ávila
10	FW	Roberto Linares	10 February 1986 (aged 24)	18	11	(Football Association of Cuba) Villa Clara
11	DF	Sander Fernández	19 July 1987 (aged 23)	3	0	(Football Association of Cuba) Ciego de Ávila
12	GK	Vismel Castellanos	24 April 1976 (aged 34)	4	0	(Football Association of Cuba) Ciudad de La Habana
13	FW	Adonis Ramos	28 July 1985 (aged 25)	8	0	(Football Association of Cuba) Granma
14	DF	Alianni Urgellés	25 June 1986 (aged 24)	18	1	(Football Association of Cuba) Guantánamo
15	FW	Armando Coroneaux	2 July 1985 (aged 25)	8	4	(Football Association of Cuba) Camagüey
16	DF	Reysander Fernández	22 August 1984 (aged 26)	48	3	(Football Association of Cuba) Ciego de Ávila
17	MF	Dagoberto Quesada	21 February 1987 (aged 23)	3	0	(Football Association of Cuba) Camagüey
18	FW	Yosniel Mesa	11 May 1981 (aged 29)	0	0	(Football Association of Cuba) Cienfuegos
19	FW	Leonel Duarte	1 August 1987 (aged 23)	34	6	(Football Association of Cuba) Ciego de Ávila

Note: Caps and goals may be incomplete for certain players, therefore being inaccurate.

=== Martinique ===
Coach: (Martinique) Guy-Michel Nisas

No.	Pos.	Player	Date of birth (age)	Caps	Goals	Club
1	GK	David Francillette		0	0	(Ligue de football de la Martinique) Samaritaine
3	DF	Sébastien Crétinoir	12 February 1986 (aged 24)	6	0	(Ligue de football de la Martinique) Club Colonial
4	DF	Daniel Hérelle	17 October 1988 (aged 22)	21	0	(Ligue de football de la Martinique) Club Colonial
5	FW	Patrick Percin (c)	18 December 1976 (aged 33)	46	15	(Ligue de football de la Martinique) Bélimois
6	DF	Johan Déluge	18 February 1987 (aged 23)	21	0	(Ligue de football de la Martinique) Emulation
7	MF	Steeve Gustan	26 January 1985 (aged 25)	20	1	(Ligue de football de la Martinique) Club Franciscain
8	MF	Rodrigue Audel	16 September 1985 (aged 25)	16	2	(Ligue de football de la Martinique) Diamantinoise
9	FW	Manuel Mencé	12 September 1987 (aged 23)	1	0	(Ligue de football de la Martinique) Rivière-Pilote
10	FW	José-Thierry Goron	1 April 1977 (aged 33)	33	11	(Ligue de football de la Martinique) Case-Pilote
11	DF	Ludovic Clément	5 December 1976 (aged 33)	6	1	Unattached
12	DF	Stéphane Suédile	14 April 1983 (aged 27)	23	0	(Ligue de football de la Martinique) Club Franciscain
13	DF	Jacky Berdix	29 August 1979 (aged 31)	0	0	(Ligue de football de la Martinique) Case-Pilote
14	MF	Fabrice Reuperné	18 September 1975 (aged 35)	11	1	(Ligue de football de la Martinique) Golden Star
15	MF	Rodrigue César	14 April 1988 (aged 22)	0	0	(French Football Federation) Istres
17	FW	Kévin Parsemain	13 February 1988 (aged 22)	9	3	(Ligue de football de la Martinique) Rivière-Pilote
18	MF	Gaëtan Sidney	13 May 1990 (aged 20)	0	0	(French Football Federation) Nancy
19	MF	Livaye Aliker	11 April 1992 (aged 18)	0	0	(Ligue de football de la Martinique) Aiglon
20	MF	Sébastien Carole	2 September 1982 (aged 28)	0	0	Unattached
21	DF	Frantz-Manuel Vulcain		0	0	(Ligue de football de la Martinique) Aiglon
24	GK	Eddy Heurlie	27 December 1977 (aged 32)	43	0	(Ligue de football de la Martinique) Bélimois

Note: Caps and goals may be incomplete for certain players, therefore being inaccurate.

=== Grenada ===
Coach: (Trinidad and Tobago) Franklyn Simpson

No.	Pos.	Player	Date of birth (age)	Caps	Goals	Club
1	GK	Andray Baptiste	15 April 1977 (aged 33)	8	0	(The Football Association) Harrow Borough
2	DF	David Cyrus	8 March 1989 (aged 21)	0	0	(The Football Association) Bradford Park Avenue
3	DF	Shannon Phillip	9 November 1988 (aged 22)	10	0	(Grenada Football Association) Hurricane
4	DF	Curt Rennie	26 June 1983 (aged 27)	3	0	Unattached
5	DF	Cassim Langaigne	27 February 1980 (aged 30)	29	3	(Grenada Football Association) Hurricane
6	DF	Marc Marshall	24 December 1985 (aged 24)	27	0	(Grenada Football Association) G.B.S.S.
7	MF	Byron Bubb	17 December 1981 (aged 28)	11	2	(The Football Association) Singh Saba Slough
8	FW	Delroy Facey	22 April 1980 (aged 30)	5	2	(The Football Association) Lincoln City
9	MF	Ricky Charles	19 June 1975 (aged 35)	37	20	(Grenada Football Association) Q.P.R.
10	MF	Kitson Bain	26 May 1982 (aged 28)	27	11	(Grenada Football Association) Q.P.R.
11	DF	Anthony Modeste (c)	30 August 1975 (aged 35)	42	6	(Jamaica Football Federation) Portmore United
12	FW	Bradley Bubb	20 May 1987 (aged 23)	0	0	(The Football Association) Farnborough
14	FW	Marcus Julien	30 December 1986 (aged 23)	13	1	(Grenada Football Association) E.S.S.
15	DF	Rimmel Daniel	28 January 1991 (aged 19)	4	0	(The Football Association) Gillingham
16	MF	Arkenson Neckles	15 March 1985 (aged 25)	8	0	Unattached
17	MF	Craig Rocastle	17 August 1981 (aged 29)	0	0	(United States Soccer Federation) Sporting Kansas City
18	FW	Kyle Joseph	27 August 1982 (aged 28)	4	0	(Grenada Football Association) Hurricane
19	DF	Patrick Modeste	30 September 1976 (aged 34)	33	2	(Grenada Football Association) Q.P.R.
20	MF	Shane Rennie	14 December 1986 (aged 23)	29	5	(Grenada Football Association) Paradise
30	GK	Shemel Louison	9 August 1990 (aged 20)	0	0	Unattached

Note: Caps and goals may be incomplete for certain players, therefore being inaccurate.

== Group I ==
=== Guyana ===
Coach: (Guyana) Wayne Dover

No.	Pos.	Player	Date of birth (age)	Caps	Goals	Club
1	GK	Ronson Williams	15 July 1987 (aged 23)	9	0	(Guyana Football Federation) Alpha United
2	MF	Chris Nurse	7 May 1984 (aged 26)	6	0	(Puerto Rican Football Federation) Puerto Rico Islanders
3	DF	Howard Lowe (c)	14 July 1979 (aged 31)	38	1	(Guyana Football Federation) Alpha United
4	DF	Chris Bourne	6 September 1985 (aged 25)	10	1	(The Football Association) Croydon Athletic
5	DF	Walter Moore	1 September 1984 (aged 26)	33	2	(Trinidad and Tobago Football Association) Caledonia AIA
6	DF	Jake Newton	9 June 1984 (aged 26)	8	0	(The Football Association) Havant & Waterlooville
7	MF	Dwain Jacobs	28 January 1987 (aged 23)	15	0	(Guyana Football Federation) Alpha United
8	MF	Dwain Ali	10 May 1978 (aged 32)	8	0	(Guyana Football Federation) Western Tigers
9	FW	Dwight Peters	23 August 1986 (aged 24)	14	3	(Guyana Football Federation) Alpha United
10	FW	Anthony Abrams	3 October 1979 (aged 31)	30	6	(Guyana Football Federation) Alpha United
11	DF	Kester Jacobs	28 July 1987 (aged 23)	6	0	(Guyana Football Federation) Alpha United
12	MF	Howard Newton	16 March 1982 (aged 28)	7	0	(The Football Association) Staines Town
13	DF	Charles Pollard	24 March 1973 (aged 37)	30	2	(Trinidad and Tobago Football Association) North East Stars
14	MF	Sean Cameron	26 January 1985 (aged 25)	8	1	(United States Soccer Federation) Miami FC
15	MF	Shawn Beveney	27 March 1982 (aged 28)	20	4	(Trinidad and Tobago Football Association) Caledonia AIA
16	MF	Philbert Moffat	16 March 1983 (aged 27)	4	0	(Guyana Football Federation) Alpha United
17	MF	Warren Gilkes	2 October 1989 (aged 21)	2	0	(Guyana Football Federation) Defence Force
18	FW	Devon Millington	11 December 1983 (aged 26)	11	3	(Guyana Football Federation) Alpha United
19	FW	Nigel Codrington	5 July 1979 (aged 31)	21	5	(Guyana Football Federation) Camptown
20	GK	Derrick Carter	16 September 1982 (aged 28)	1	0	(Guyana Football Federation) Western Tigers

Note: Caps and goals may be incomplete for certain players, therefore being inaccurate.

=== Guadeloupe ===
Coach: (Guadeloupe) Roger Salnot

No.	Pos.	Player	Date of birth (age)	Caps	Goals	Club
1	GK	Yohan Bus	2 December 1986 (aged 23)	6	0	(Ligue guadeloupéenne de football) Le Moule
2	DF	Kevin Lacroix	13 October 1984 (aged 26)	3	0	Unattached
3	DF	Mathias Babel	26 May 1983 (aged 27)	7	0	(Ligue guadeloupéenne de football) Saintes de Terre-de-Haut
4	DF	Ulrick Lupede	1 June 1984 (aged 26)	0	0	(Portuguese Football Federation) Naval
5	FW	Dominique Mocka	13 August 1978 (aged 32)	27	11	(Ligue guadeloupéenne de football) Vieux-Habitants
6	MF	Stéphane Auvray (c)	4 September 1981 (aged 29)	16	2	(United States Soccer Federation) Sporting Kansas City
7	FW	Michaël Niçoise	19 September 1984 (aged 26)	3	1	(Royal Belgian Football Association) Tournai
8	MF	Flavien Belson	27 February 1987 (aged 23)	0	0	(French Football Federation) Cannes
9	FW	Ludovic Gotin	25 July 1985 (aged 25)	16	11	(Ligue guadeloupéenne de football) Le Moule
10	MF	Grégory Gendrey	10 July 1986 (aged 24)	16	6	(French Football Federation) Compiègne
11	FW	Mickaël Antoine-Curier	5 March 1983 (aged 27)	11	6	Unattached
12	FW	Cédric Collet	7 March 1984 (aged 26)	6	1	(Royal Belgian Football Association) Standard Liège
13	DF	Jean-Luc Lambourde	10 April 1980 (aged 30)	44	10	(Ligue guadeloupéenne de football) Amical Club
14	DF	Julien Ictoi	22 March 1978 (aged 32)	7	0	(Ligue guadeloupéenne de football) Le Moule
15	MF	Livio Nabab	14 June 1988 (aged 22)	5	0	(French Football Federation) Caen
16	GK	Marius Fausta	28 April 1973 (aged 37)	14	0	(Ligue guadeloupéenne de football) Evolucas
17	MF	Lery Hanany	1 October 1982 (aged 28)	33	4	(Ligue guadeloupéenne de football) La Gauloise
18	DF	Eddy Viator	2 June 1982 (aged 28)	7	0	Unattached
19	MF	Larry Clavier	9 January 1981 (aged 29)	5	0	(Portuguese Football Federation) Penafiel
20	FW	Loïc Loval	28 September 1981 (aged 29)	10	3	(French Football Federation) Vannes

Note: Caps and goals may be incomplete for certain players, therefore being inaccurate.

=== Jamaica ===
Coach: (Jamaica) Theodore Whitmore

No.	Pos.	Player	Date of birth (age)	Caps	Goals	Club
1	GK	Richard McCallum	23 March 1984 (aged 26)	7	0	(Jamaica Football Federation) Waterhouse
2	MF	Richard Edwards	April 15, 1983 (aged 27)	18	0	(Jamaica Football Federation) Harbour View
3	MF	Sergio Campbell	January 16, 1992 (aged 18)	0	0	(Jamaica Football Federation) Clarendon College
4	DF	Shavar Thomas (c)	29 January 1981 (aged 29)	34	0	(United States Soccer Federation) Sporting Kansas City
5	DF	O'Brian Woodbine	1 November 1988 (aged 22)	7	0	(Jamaica Football Federation) Reno
6	DF	Jermaine Taylor	14 January 1985 (aged 25)	45	0	(Jamaica Football Federation) St. George's
7	MF	Lovel Palmer	30 August 1984 (aged 26)	16	0	(United States Soccer Federation) Houston Dynamo
8	DF	Eric Vernan	4 July 1987 (aged 23)	18	2	(Jamaica Football Federation) Portmore United
9	FW	Ryan Johnson	26 November 1984 (aged 26)	8	2	(United States Soccer Federation) San Jose Earthquakes
10	FW	Keammar Daley	February 18, 1988 (aged 22)	12	2	(Jamaica Football Federation) Tivoli Gardens
11	FW	Dane Richards	14 December 1983 (aged 26)	21	2	(United States Soccer Federation) New York Red Bulls
12	MF	Marvin Morgan	16 August 1992 (aged 18)	1	0	(Jamaica Football Federation) Boys' Town
13	GK	Dwayne Miller	14 July 1987 (aged 23)	13	0	(Swedish Football Association) Syrianska
14	FW	Omar Cummings	13 July 1982 (aged 28)	18	4	(United States Soccer Federation) Colorado Rapids
15	DF	Shaun Francis	2 October 1986 (aged 24)	2	0	(United States Soccer Federation) Columbus Crew
16	DF	Troy Smith	24 April 1987 (aged 23)	2	0	(Jamaica Football Federation) Village United
17	MF	Rodolph Austin	1 June 1985 (aged 25)	32	3	(Norwegian Football Federation) Brann
18	DF	Keneil Moodie	July 29, 1986 (aged 24)	13	0	(Jamaica Football Federation) Waterhouse
19	DF	Adrian Reid	March 10, 1985 (aged 25)	19	0	(Jamaica Football Federation) Portmore United
20	FW	Luton Shelton	11 November 1985 (aged 25)	50	28	(Norwegian Football Federation) Vålerenga

Note: Caps and goals may be incomplete for certain players, therefore being inaccurate.

=== Antigua and Barbuda ===
Coach: (Antigua and Barbuda) Rowan Benjamin

No.	Pos.	Player	Date of birth (age)	Caps	Goals	Club
1	GK	Molvin James	4 May 1989 (aged 21)	6	0	(Antigua and Barbuda Football Association) Villa Lions
2	DF	Ranjae Christian	18 December 1971 (aged 38)	26	2	(Antigua and Barbuda Football Association) Bassa
3	DF	Kerry Parker	16 December 1979 (aged 30)	5	0	(Antigua and Barbuda Football Association) SAP
4	MF	Karanja Mack	24 August 1987 (aged 23)	13	0	(Antigua and Barbuda Football Association) SAP
5	DF	Dave Carr	27 January 1982 (aged 28)	24	0	(Antigua and Barbuda Football Association) Bassa
6	MF	Josh Parker	1 December 1990 (aged 19)	3	0	(The Football Association) Wycombe Wanderers
7	FW	Gayson Gregory	5 April 1982 (aged 28)	30	5	(Trinidad and Tobago Football Association) Joe Public
8	MF	Quentin Griffith	27 February 1992 (aged 18)	5	1	(Antigua and Barbuda Football Association) Golden Stars
9	FW	Kerry Skepple	25 November 1980 (aged 30)	14	1	(Antigua and Barbuda Football Association) All Saints United
10	MF	Desmond Bleau	2 September 1982 (aged 28)	11	1	(Antigua and Barbuda Football Association) Sea View Farm
11	FW	Jamie Thomas	21 October 1985 (aged 25)	19	7	(Antigua and Barbuda Football Association) Bassa
12	MF	Justin Cochrane	26 January 1982 (aged 28)	8	1	(The Football Association) Boreham Wood
13	MF	Keiran Murtagh	29 October 1988 (aged 22)	0	0	(The Football Association) Wycombe Wanderers
14	FW	Randolph Burton	14 January 1987 (aged 23)	14	3	(Antigua and Barbuda Football Association) Bassa
15	MF	Lawson Robinson	19 October 1986 (aged 24)	2	0	(Antigua and Barbuda Football Association) All Saints United
16	FW	Peter Byers	20 October 1984 (aged 26)	24	12	(Antigua and Barbuda Football Association) Parham
17	DF	George Dublin (c)	11 February 1977 (aged 33)	36	2	(Antigua and Barbuda Football Association) Hoppers
18	GK	Keita DeCastro	23 May 1981 (aged 29)	7	0	(Antigua and Barbuda Football Association) All Saints United
19	DF	Marvin McCoy	2 October 1988 (aged 22)	0	0	(The Football Association) Wycombe Wanderers
20	MF	Akeem Thomas	5 January 1990 (aged 20)	8	1	(Antigua and Barbuda Football Association) Bassa

Note: Caps and goals may be incomplete for certain players, therefore being inaccurate.
