= Trimeresurus nummifer =

Trimeresurus nummifer is a taxonomic synonym that may refer to:

- Atropoides picadoi, a.k.a. the, a venomous pitviper species found in Central America
- Atropoides nummifer, a.k.a. the, a venomous pitviper species found in Mexico and Central America
