= Metlapilcoatlus indomitus =

Scientific classification
- Kingdom: Animalia
- Phylum: Chordata
- Class: Reptilia
- Order: Squamata
- Suborder: Serpentes
- Family: Viperidae
- Genus: Metlapilcoatlus
- Species: M. indomitus

Binomial name
- Metlapilcoatlus indomitus Smith & Ferrari-Castro, 2008

Species of Central American snake

Metlapilcoatus indomitus is an endangered species of jumping pit viper endemic to Central America. Like all pit vipers, it is venomous. It is named in honour of Hondurans and the project Honduras Indomita, with "indomitus" meaning "that which will not be conquered" in Latin.

== Description ==
Metlapilcoatlus indomitus is a medium-sized snake, reaching around 64 cm in length, with females slightly longer. A third of its body, at the end of its tail, is darker on the underside and it displays a postorbital stripe. These make it easy to distinguish from other Metlapicoatlus species, but not Atripoides picadoi, which shares these markings. It can be distinguished from A. picadoi by its lighter markings which are slightly smaller. They can also be distinguished by their unusual lack of hemipenal spines, which most pitvipers possess.

Neonates may show a light tip to their tail, which may be used to distract prey.

For specific scale counts, scales of M. indomitus can vary. Nasorostral scales are known to vary from none to two.

== Habitat ==
Preferring elevations of 670-1200m, M. indomitus is found in tropical rainforests. It is classified as endangered by the IUCN Red List as its habitat spans a total of 500 km$^2$ and falling as it continues to be deforested.

== Diet ==
Metlapilcoatlus indomitus is known to eat field mice in captivity. In the wild, neonates eat small insects and lizards, while juveniles may eat frogs.

== Life cycle ==
=== Reproduction ===
As with many viperids, M. indomitus reproduction begins with courtship where a male will use his jaw to lightly tap on the dorsal side of a female to get her to uncoil. This tapping continues throughout copulation which typically lasts around 20 minutes. Males may then attempt to initiate once more by jaw tapping again, but this has not been observed as successful. Likely due to low population and so low male-female encounters, M. indomitus is known to be an opportunistic mater, reported to have mated 24 hours before giving birth, likely to store the sperm. M. indomitus is ovoviviparous and known to give birth in June, coinciding with the rainy season in Honduras, typically birthing clutches of 14–26 neonates measuring around 20–25 cm.

=== Early life ===
Parent snakes do not appear to raise their young past birth. Neonates experience their first moult within 24 hours after birth. When threatened neonates will shake their tail against the ground, take defensive positions and show their fangs. Neonates in the wild will disperse from each other quickly and if they are kept together in captivity they may attack each other.
