= Trigonocephalus affinis =

Trigonocephalus affinis is a taxonomic synonym that may refer to:

- Atropoides nummifer occiduus, a.k.a. the Guatemalan jumping pitviper, a venomous pitviper subspecies found in southern Mexico, Guatemala and El Salvador
- Gloydius intermedius, a.k.a. the Central Asian pitviper, a venomous pitviper species found in northern Asia
