= Rimmel (disambiguation) =

Rimmel may refer to:

- Rimmel, British multinational cosmetics brand
- Rimmel (album), album by Italian singer-songwriter Francesco De Gregori

== People with the name ==
- Aleksander Rimmel (1888–?), Estonian politician
- Eugène Rimmel (1820–1887), French-born British perfumer and businessman
- Kai Rimmel (born 1952), Estonian politician
- Rimmel Daniel (born 1991), Grenadian footballer
