= Andray =

Andray is a given name. Notable people with the name include:

- Andray Baptiste (born 1977), Grenadian footballer
- Andray Blatche (born 1986), American-Filipino basketball player
