= FC San Marcos =

Nicaraguan football club

San Marcos FC
- Full name: San Marcos
- Nicknames: Los Canarios, Sanmarqueños
- Founded: 1982
- Ground: Estadio Leonardo G. Jara; San Marcos, Nicaragua
- Capacity: 2,000
- Chairman: Juan Edgar Selaya
- Manager: Marcos Bodán
- League: Primera División de Nicaragua
- 2013 Apertura: 8th
Home colours

FC San Marcos is a Nicaraguan football club that currently plays in the Nicaraguan Premier Division.

It is based in San Marcos. Their home stadium is Estadio Leonardo G. Jara.

== History ==
San Marcos won promotion back to the Nicaraguan Premier Division in summer 2013, after an absence of six years.

== Honours ==
=== Domestic honours ===
==== League ====
- Segunda División de Nicaragua
  - Champions (2) : 2005-2006, 2025 Apertura
- Liga.2 and predecessors
  - Champions (1) : 2025 Clausura
  - Playoff winner (1) : 2024-2025

==== Domestic Cups ====
- Copa de Nicaragua and predecessors
  - Champions (2) : 1984, 1995

== Performance in CONCACAF competitions ==
- CONCACAF Cup Winners Cup (3 appearances)
  1995 – Qualifying stage (Central Zone)
  1996 – Qualifying stage (Central Zone)
  2002 – Qualifying stage (Central Zone)

== Current squad ==
As of October, 2026 Note: Flags indicate national team as defined under FIFA eligibility rules; some limited exceptions apply. Players may hold more than one non-FIFA nationality.

No.	Pos.	Nation	Player
1	GK	NCA	Denis Espinoza
3	DF	COL	Hernan Benitez
4	DF	COL	Jhon Quiñónes
5	DF	NCA	Erick Velasquez
6		NCA	Jeremias Aaron Hurtado
7		NCA	Angel Osorno
8		COL	Erick Alcázar
9		NCA	Alan Mercado
14	DF	NCA	David Rodriguez
15	DF	NCA	Wilder Wilson
16		COL	Julio Sánchez
17	MF	NCA	Harry Rivas

No.	Pos.	Nation	Player
18		NCA	Eduardo Hernandez
19		NCA	Freddy Ortiz
20		NCA	Jurgen Berge
23		NCA	Ramon Morales
24		NCA	Giovanni Romero
42	GK	NCA	Eyner Calero
—		NCA	Joarlyn Caldera
—		COL	Esteban Molina
—		COL	Ángel Olier
—		COL	Robinson Paterson

=== Players with dual citizenship ===
- (Nicaragua) (Switzerland) Freddy Ortiz
- (Nicaragua) (Colombia) Erick Alcázar
- (Colombia) (United States) Esteban Molina

=== In ===
Note: Flags indicate national team as defined under FIFA eligibility rules; some limited exceptions apply. Players may hold more than one non-FIFA nationality.

No.	Pos.	Nation	Player
—		NCA	David Rodriguez (From ART Jalapa)
—		NCA	Eyner Calero (From Xilotepelt FC)
—		COL	Hernan Dario Benitez (From Pumas FC)
—		NCA	Harry Rivas (From Juventus Managua)
—		COL	Ángel Olier (From Tigres de Chinandega)
—		COL	Julio Sánchez (From Matiguas FC)
—		COL	Robinson Paterson (From CD Parque del Plata)

No.	Pos.	Nation	Player
—		NCA	Jurgen Berge (From CS Sebaco)
—		NCA	TBD (From TBD)
—		NCA	TBD (From TBD)
—		NCA	TBD (From TBD)

=== Out ===
Note: Flags indicate national team as defined under FIFA eligibility rules; some limited exceptions apply. Players may hold more than one non-FIFA nationality.

No.	Pos.	Nation	Player
—		ARG	Brian Calabrese (To Cobán Imperial)
—		NCA	Elmer Portocarrero (To TBD)
—		NCA	Darwing Hernandez (To TBD)
—		NCA	Mario Davila (To TBD)
—		NCA	Carlos Munoz (To TBD)
—		NCA	Josue Garcia (To TBD)
—		ARG	Carlos Torres (To TBD)

No.	Pos.	Nation	Player
—		NCA	Tyrone Acevedo (To TBD)
—		COL	Yeiner Vivas (To TBD)
—		COL	Kevin Valencia (To TBD)
—		NCA	Yair Espinoza (To TBD)
—		NCA	TBD (To TBD)

== Personnel ==
=== Coaching staff ===
As of May 2026

Position	Staff
Coach	(Nicaragua) Tyrone Acevedo
Assistant manager	(El Salvador) Rolando Mendez (*)
Reserve manager	(El Salvador) Nasser Wladimir Jerez (*)
Goalkeeper Coach	(Costa Rica) Jairo Villegas (*)
Under 17 Manager	(El Salvador) TBD (*)
Under 15 Manager	(El Salvador) TBD
Sporting director	(El Salvador) TBD (*)
Fitness Coach	(Costa Rica) Gredy Rodriguez (*)
Team Doctor	(El Salvador) TBD (*)
Fitness Coach	(El Salvador) TBD (*)
Physiotherapy	(El Salvador) TBD (*)
Utility	(El Salvador) TBD (*)

== List of coaches ==
- (Nicaragua) Nasser Jérez (2001)
- (Nicaragua) Luis Diaz (2002)
- (Nicaragua) Marcos Bodán (2009–)
- (Nicaragua) Tyron Acevedo
