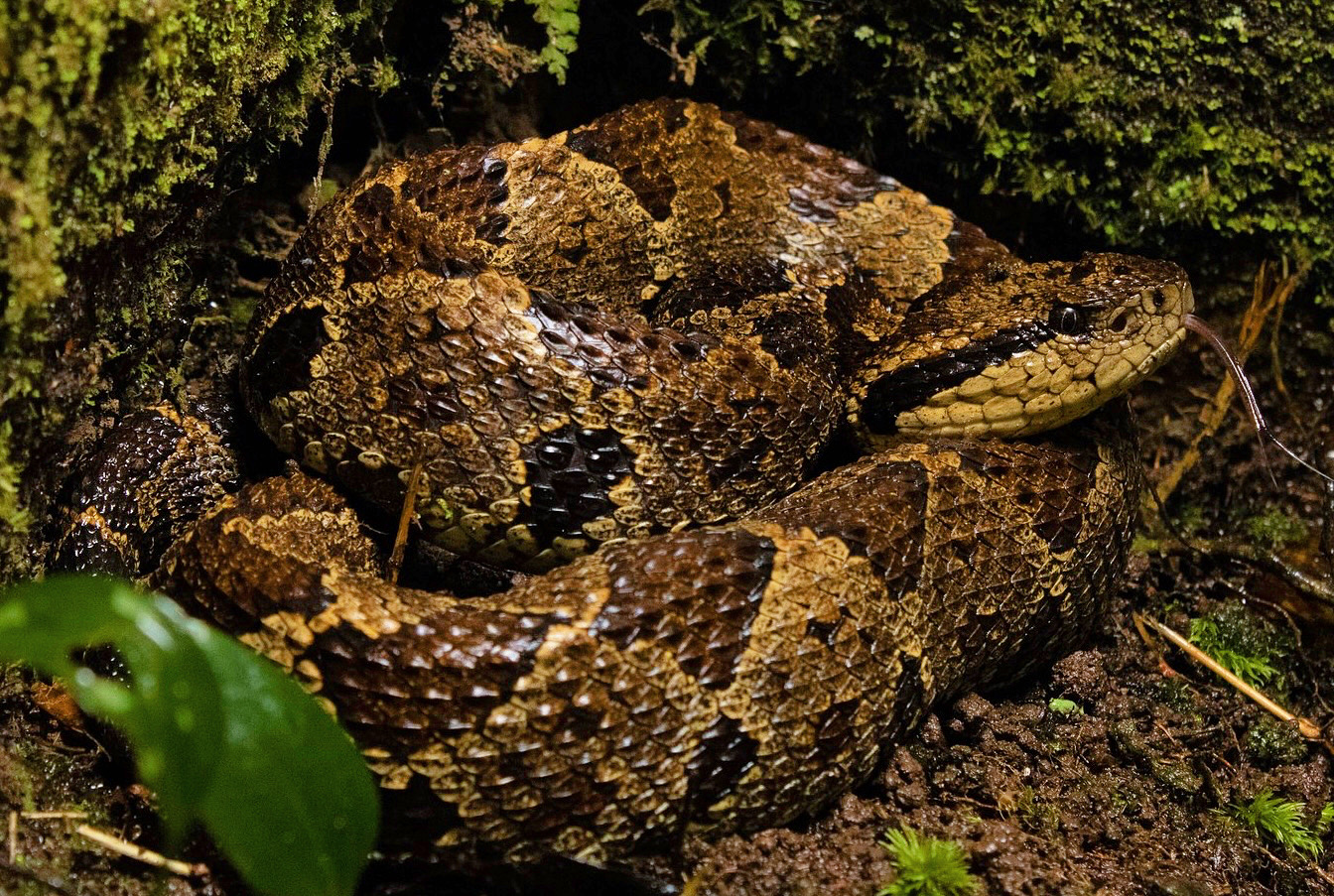

Conservation status
- Least Concern (IUCN 3.1)

Scientific classification
- Kingdom: Animalia
- Phylum: Chordata
- Class: Reptilia
- Order: Squamata
- Suborder: Serpentes
- Family: Viperidae
- Genus: Metlapilcoatlus
- Species: M. nummifer

Binomial name
- Metlapilcoatlus nummifer (Rüppell, 1845)
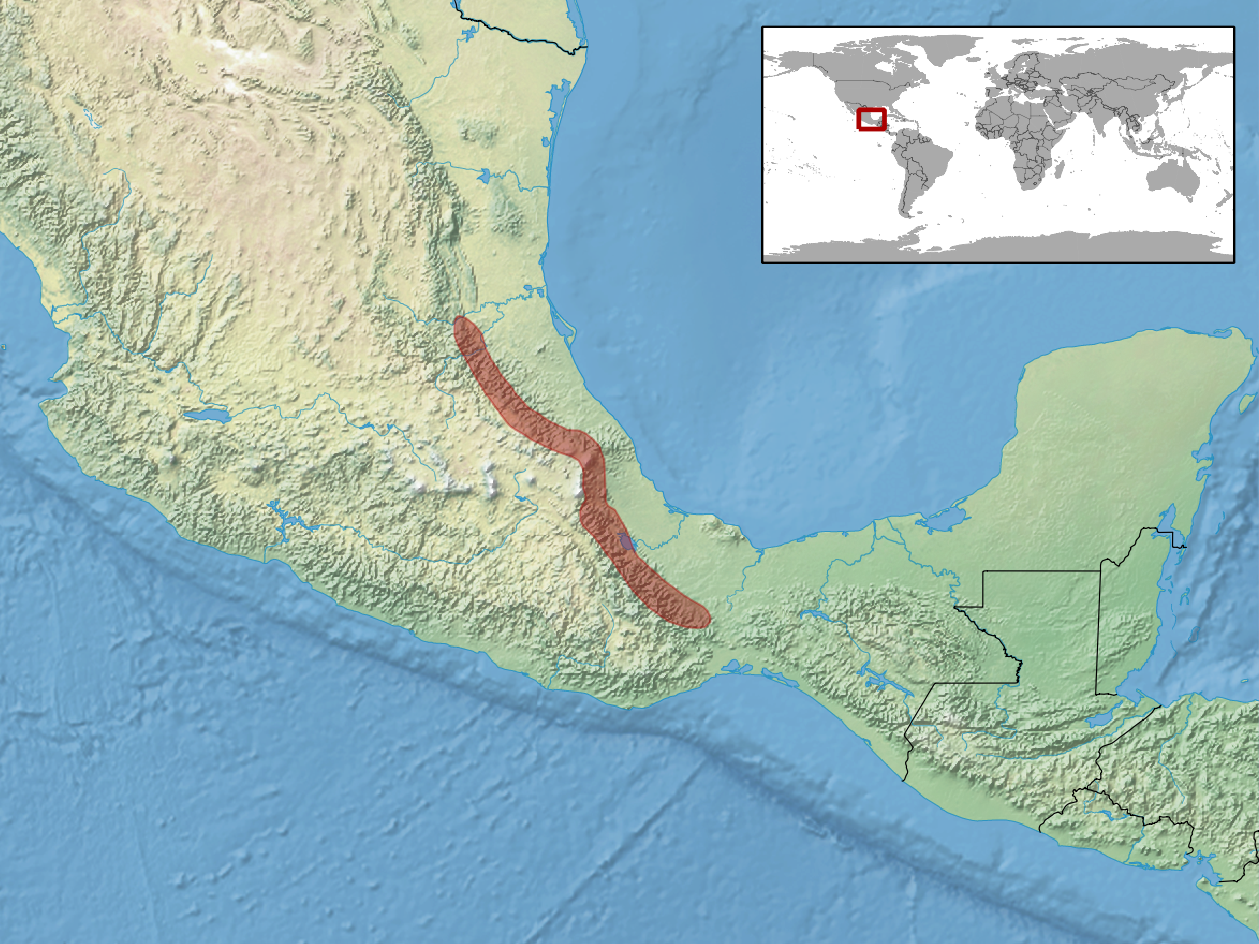

Synonyms
- Atropos nummifer Rüppell, 1845; T[rigonocephalus]. nummifer – Jan, 1859; T[eleuraspis]. nummifer – Cope, 1860; B[othrops]. nummifer – Jan, 1863; Th[anotos]. nummifer – Posada Arango, 1889; Th[anotophis]. nummifer – Posada Arango, 1889; Bothriechis nummifera – Günther, 1895; Lachesis nummifer – Boulenger, 1896; Lachesis nummifera – Boettger, 1898; Trimeresurus nummifer – Mocquard, 1909; Bothriochis mammifera Recinos, 1913 (ex errore); Bothrops nummifera – March, 1929; T[rimeresurus]. n[ummifer]. nummifer – Dunn, 1939; Bothrops nummifer nummifer – Burger, 1950; Bothrops nummifer veraecrusis Burger, 1950; Porthidium nummifer – Campbell & Lamar, 1989; Atropoides nummifer – Werman, 1992

= Metlapilcoatlus nummifer =

Species of snake

Metlapilcoatlus nummifer, commonly known as Mexican jumping pit viper or jumping viper, is a pit viper species endemic to Mexico.

== Description ==
Adults are short and exceedingly stout, commonly growing to 18–24 inches (46–61 centimetres) in total length. The snout is rounded with a sharp canthus.

At midbody there are 23–27 rows of dorsal scales that are strongly keeled, tubercular in large specimens. The ventral scales are 121–135, while the subcaudals are 26–36 and mostly single. The eye is separated from the labial scales by 3–4 rows of small scales.

The color pattern consists of a tan, light brown or gray ground color that is overlaid with a series of around 20 dark brown or black rhomboid blotches. The lower tips of these blotches often connect with spots on the flanks to form narrow crossbands. The top of the head is dark with oblique postorbital stripes, below which the side of the head is a lighter color. The belly is whitish, occasionally with dark brown blotches.

These snakes have sometimes been mistaken for young bushmasters (Lachesis muta), but can easily be identified by their lack of a specialized tail tip.

== Geographic range ==
Found in eastern Mexico from San Luis Potosí southeastward on the Atlantic versant and lowlands. Found in various types of forest, including cloud forest and rain forest at 40–1,600 m (130–5,250 ft) altitude. The type originally lacked locality information, but apparently "Mexico" was filled in some time later. A restriction to Teapa, Tabasco, Mexico, was proposed by Burger (1950). Metlapilcoatlus mexicanus and Metlapilcoatlus occiduus were both formerly considered subspecies.

== Conservation status ==
This species was classified as Least Concern (LC) when last assessed by the IUCN Red List of Threatened Species in March 2007, though this assessment is annotated as "needs updating" by the organization. The species is currently classified as threatened by the government of Mexico.
