= Atropos (synonym) =

Atropos is a taxonomic synonym that may refer to:

- Atropoides, a.k.a. jumping pitvipers, a genus of venomous snakes found in Mexico and Central America.
- Trimeresurus, a.k.a. Asian pit vipers, a genus of venomous snakes found in Asia from Pakistan, through India, China, throughout Southeast Asia and the Pacific Islands.
