= Bothrops affinis =

Bothrops affinis may refer to:

- Bothrops atrox, also known as the common lancehead, a venomous pitviper found in South America
- Atropoides nummifer occiduus, also known as the Guatemalan jumping pitviper, a venomous pitviper found in southern Mexico, Guatemala and El Salvador
