= Metlapilcoatlus borealis =

Scientific classification
- Domain: Eukaryota
- Kingdom: Animalia
- Phylum: Chordata
- Class: Reptilia
- Order: Squamata
- Suborder: Serpentes
- Family: Viperidae
- Genus: Metlapilcoatlus
- Species: M. borealis

Binomial name
- Metlapilcoatlus borealis Tepos-Ramírez et al., 2021

Species of Mexican snake

Metlapilcoatus borealis is a species of jumping pit viper endemic to Mexico, named after the northernmost section of its distribution. Like all pit vipers, it is venomous.

== Description ==
M. borealis is a medium-sized snake, measuring up to 66cm in males and 60cm in females. Its specific scale count can also help identification, with 22-25 rows of scales over its middle, 4-6 nasorostral scales, 130-132 ventral scales, 26-35 subcaudals, 8-10 supraoculars and 2-3 interoculabials. Genetically it can also be distinguished by three unique nucleotide sequences.
