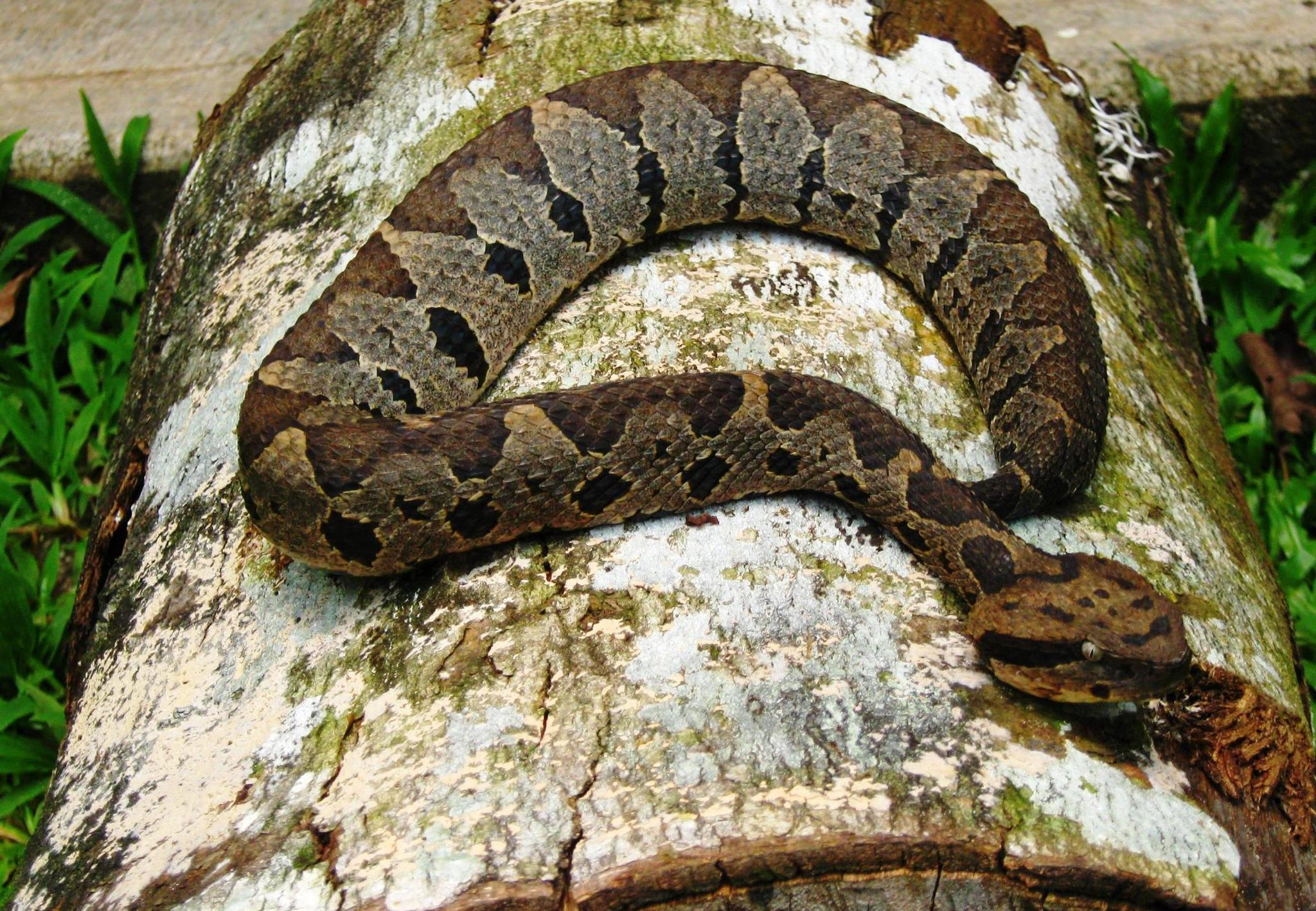

Conservation status
- Least Concern (IUCN 3.1)

Scientific classification
- Kingdom: Animalia
- Phylum: Chordata
- Class: Reptilia
- Order: Squamata
- Suborder: Serpentes
- Family: Viperidae
- Genus: Metlapilcoatlus
- Species: M. olmec

Binomial name
- Metlapilcoatlus olmec (Pérez-Higareda, H.M. Smith & Juliá-Zertuche, 1985)
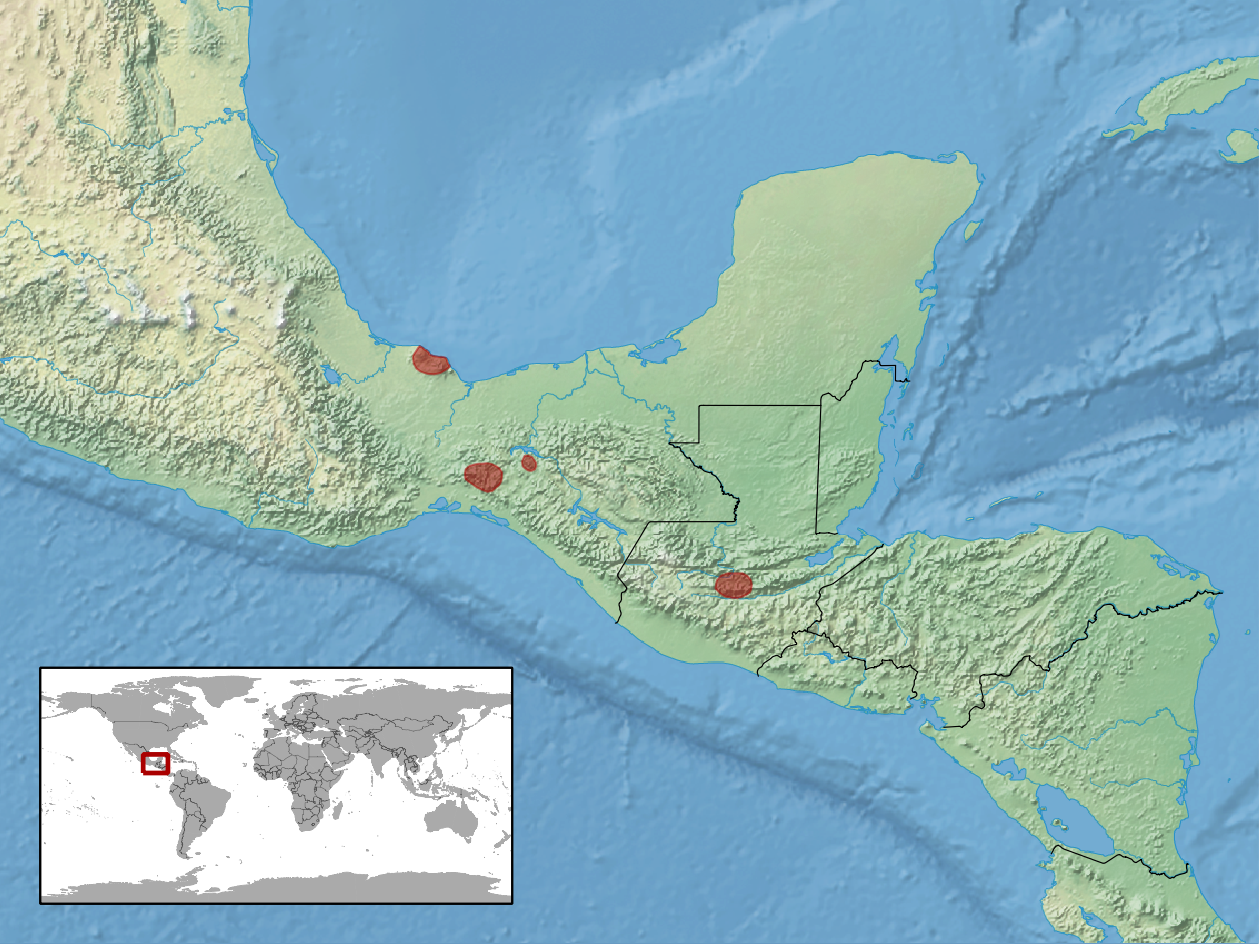

Synonyms
- Porthidium olmec - Pérez-Higareda, H.M. Smith & Juliá-Zertuche, 1985; A[tropoides]. olmec - Werman, 1992

= Metlapilcoatlus olmec =

Species of snake

Common names: Tuxtlan jumping pit viper, Olmecan pit viper

Metlapilcoatlus olmec is a pit viper species found in Mexico. No subspecies are currently recognized.

== Description ==
Extremely stout, females are known to reach a maximum of 77.0 cm in length, males 61.8 cm.

== Geographic range ==
Found at elevations of 800–1,500 m in Mexico on the upper slopes of the Sierra de Los Tuxtlas in southern Veracruz. Also found in eastern Oaxaca, and from northwestern Chiapas to Guatemala. The type locality given is "crest of Cerro Egega, 1100 m, municipality of Catemaco" (Veracruz, Mexico).

== Conservation status ==
This species is classified as Least Concern (LC) on the IUCN Red List of Threatened Species (v3.1, 2001). Species are listed as such due to their wide distribution, presumed large population, or because it is unlikely to be declining fast enough to qualify for listing in a more threatened category. The population trend is stable. Year assessed: 2007.
