= Clodomiro Picado Twight =

Costa Rican scientist (1887–1944)

Clodomiro Picado
- Born: April 17, 1887; San Marcos, Nicaragua
- Died: May 16, 1944 (aged 57); San José, Costa Rica
- Education: La Sorbonne, Paris

Clodomiro Picado Twight (April 17, 1887 – May 16, 1944), also known as "Clorito Picado", was a Costa Rican scientist who was internationally recognized for his pioneering research on snake venom and the development of various antivenins. His work on molds was a precursor to the formal discovery of penicillin and resulted in compounds which he used to treat patients at least one year before the re-discovery of penicillin by Alexander Fleming. He wrote over 115 works, mainly books and monographs.

== Biography ==
=== Early life ===
Picado was born in April 1887 in San Marcos, Nicaragua to Clodomiro Picado Lara and Carlota Twight Dengo, who both had Costa Rican citizenship. In 1890, when Picado was two years old, he and his parents moved to Cartago, Costa Rica. He then attended San Luis Gonzaga high school, graduating in 1906. Due to his excellent grades, he was granted a scholarship to study in France, where he later studied at the University of the Sorbonne and received his diploma in Zoology in 1909. In 1910, he returned to Costa Rica, but left shortly after to continue his studies. He received his diploma with superior studies in Botany. Picado received the academic rank of Doctor in science in 1913, and that same year he was admitted to the Pasteur Institute and the Colonial Institute of Paris. In 1915, he published "Anales del Hospital de San José", a quarterly medical publication in Costa Rica.

=== Death ===
In 1944, after an ailment Picado died. Dr. Picado was declared "Meritorious of the Motherland" (Spanish: Benemérito de la Patria) by the Costa Rican Congress, by means of decree no. 34 of 21 of December 1943.

== Investigation and findings ==
The scientific work of Dr. Picado was prolific and very extensive; it is calculated that he wrote about 115 research papers in his lifetime, delving into nearly all aspects of his environment: soil, flora, fauna, human tissues, water, and others. Among them are included books and monographs. His work covered topics of zoology, botany of bromeliads, ophidism, physiology, phytopathology, industrial microbiology, medical microbiology, and immunology.

In March 2000, doctors from the San Juan de Dios Hospital in San José, the capital of Costa Rica, published his manuscripts, in which he explains his experiences between 1915 and 1927 with the inhibiting action of fungi of the Penicillium genus in the growth of Staphylococci and Streptococci (bacteria that cause a series of infections). In 1927, he demonstrated the inhibitory action of the fungal genus Penicillium on the proliferation of the bacteria Staphylococcus and Streptococcus. Although, the discovery of penicillin has been attributed to Alexander Fleming, Picado's old laboratory notebooks from 1923 show records of the antibiosis of Penicillium sp.

For this reason he is renowned as one of the precursors of the penicillin antibiotic. The report with the results of the treatments performed with penicillin by Dr. Picado were published by the Biology Society of Paris in 1927.

== Honors and recognition ==
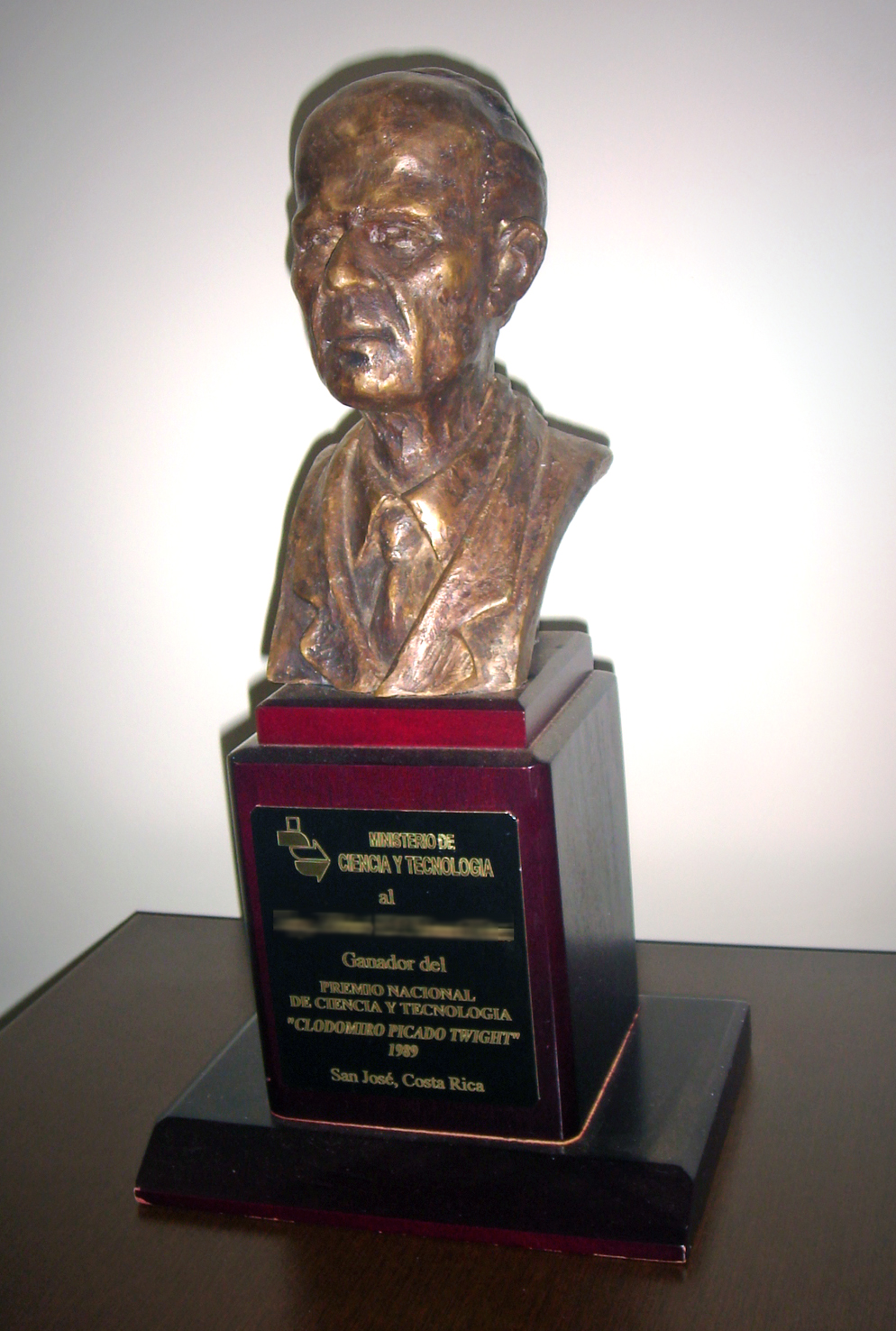
Statuette awarded to the winners of the Costa Rican National Award of Science and Technology "Clodomiro Picado Twight"

In memory of Dr. Picado's outstanding scientific work, since 1977 the Costa Rican Ministry of Science and Technology (MICIT), together with the Ministry of Culture, Youth and Sport (MCJD) grant annually the National Award of Science and Technology "Clodomiro Picado Twight", as stimulus and recognition for the prominent scientific and technological work of Costa Rican citizens. The prize was modified in June 2000, and divided into the following two categories a year later:

- National Award of Science "Clodomiro Picado Twight"
- National Award of Technology "Clodomiro Picado Twight"

Both prizes are awarded annually. The winners become creditors of a commemorative statuette of Dr. Picado, a parchment and a prize in cash.

Picado was featured on the 2,000 colones bill, a banknote of Costa Rica.

In 2000, Picado's daughter-in-law, Lolita González Picado, accepted the Gold Medal awarded posthumously to Picado by the World Intellectual Property Organization (WIPO).

There are several institutions and places in Costa Rica named in Picado's memory:

- Clodomiro Picado Research Institute in Dulce Nombre de Jesús, Vázques de Coronado, San José. Established in 1970, the institute is a research unit of the Universidad de Costa Rica, responsible for the production of snake antiophidic serums and scientific research on serpents and their venoms, as well as educational and extension programs in rural areas and hospitals.
- Clodomiro Picado Twight High School (known also as I.E.T.), in Turrialba, Cartago.
- Clodomiro Picado Medical Clinic, in Cinco Esquinas, Tibás, San José.
- Clodomiro Picado Twight Auditorio de la Universidad Nacional

A species of Central American venomous snake, Atropoides picadoi, is named in his honor.
