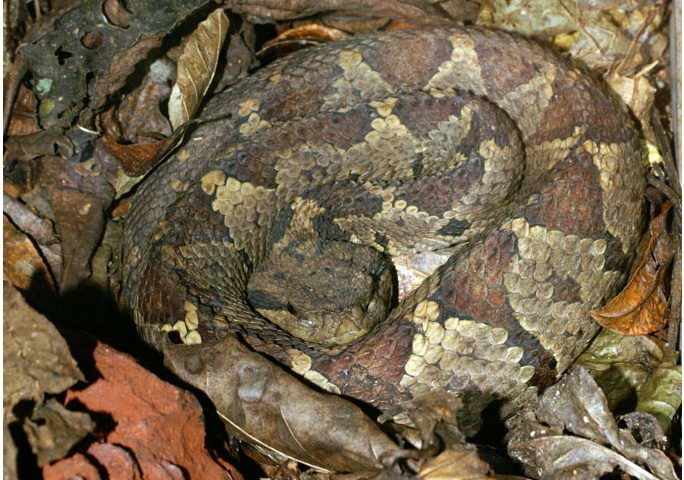
- Metlapilcoatlus mexicanus

Scientific classification
- Kingdom: Animalia
- Phylum: Chordata
- Class: Reptilia
- Order: Squamata
- Suborder: Serpentes
- Family: Viperidae
- Subfamily: Crotalinae
- Genus: Metlapilcoatlus; Campbell, Frost, & Castoe, 2019

= Metlapilcoatlus =

Genus of snakes

Metlapilcoatlus is a genus of pit vipers endemic to Mexico and Central America. Six species are currently recognized. The common names suggest they are able to leap at an attacker, but this is likely exaggerated. Common names for the species include jumping pitvipers and jumping vipers. The genus name comes from the Nahuatl name metlapilcohuatl, which means of the oblong grindstone held in the hand when grinding corn—alluding to the (edit "shape of its head which looks like the shape and size of the grindstone") (original "snake's short, stocky body.") I live in Costa Rica, and 2 different groups of herpetologist describe it that way online

== Description ==
All of these snakes are extremely thick-bodied, with M. nummifer being the most stout. The head is large, with small eyes and a broadly rounded snout. The tail is short, not prehensile, and accounts for only 15% of the total length.

The color pattern usually consists of a gray-brown or reddish brown ground color (sometimes yellow, cream, purplish brown or black), overlaid with a series of lateral and dorsal blotches. The shape of these blotches is subject to some variation, but is sometimes still helpful for identification.

== Geographic range ==
Found in the mountains of eastern Mexico southeastward on the Atlantic versant and lowlands though Central America to central Panama. On the Pacific versant, they occur in isolated populations in east-central and southern Mexico, Guatemala, El Salvador, Costa Rica and Panama.

== Behavior ==
The common name alludes to the supposed ability these snakes have to launch themselves at an attacker during a strike, thereby bridging a distance that is equal to or greater than the length of the body. Mehrtens (1987) states that they live up to their name, striking at their assailants with such force that they actually leave the ground. Campbell and Lamar (2004), on the other hand, describe this as greatly exaggerated, saying that actually these snakes are only able to strike about half of their own body length. In addition, they describe them as slow moving and non-aggressive. However, when provoked all species will put on a rather dramatic open-mouthed threat display.

These snakes may be active both during the day and at night. On the other hand, populations found at higher altitudes seem to be active only during daylight hours and never at night.

== Feeding ==
Adults feed mainly on small mammals and lizards, while juveniles feed on orthopterans and skinks.

== Venom ==
Unlike most vipers, members of this genus will strike and then hold on and chew. In one case, a machete was used to pry off the jaws. March (1929) wrote that M. mexicanus (M. nummifer) will hang on and make half a dozen punctures unless quickly and forcibly removed. However, the effects of the venom include only transient pain and mild swelling. In one part of Honduras the locals even insist that the snake (M. nummifer) is not venomous. Laboratory studies suggest that Metlapilcoatlus venoms are unlikely to lead to consumption coagulopathy and incoagulable blood in humans.

== Species ==
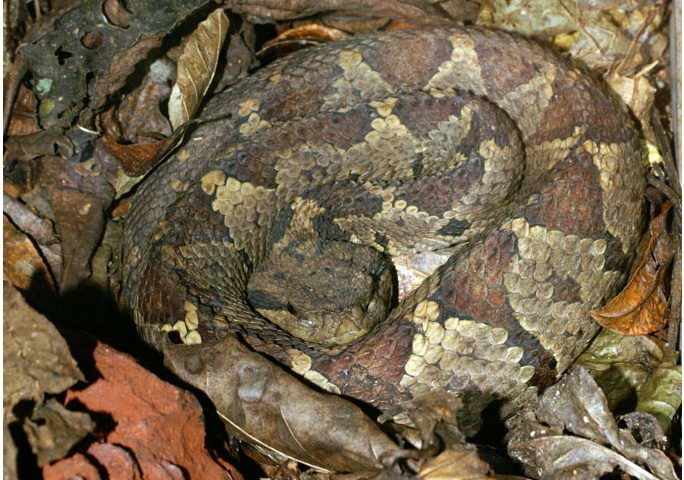
Image	Species	Taxon author	Subsp.*	Common name	Geographic range
	M. borealis	Tepos-Ramírez et al., 2021	0	Boreal jumping pit viper	Mexico on the Sierra Madre Oriental, South of San Luis Potosí to Hidalgo and North of Veracruz.
	M. indomitus	Smith & Ferrari-Castro, 2008	0	Botaderos jumping pit viper	Sierra de Botaderos and La Muralla of Honduras.
	M. mexicanus	Duméril, Bibron & Duméril, 1854	0	Central American jumping pit viper	Southern Mexico, Belize, Guatemala, Honduras, Nicaragua, Costa Rica, El Salvador, Panama.
	M. nummifer	Rüppell, 1845	0	Mexican jumping pit viper	Mexico, South of Veracruz to Oaxaca, Chiapas, Puebla.
	M. occiduus	Hoge, 1966	0	Guatemalan jumping pit viper	Mexico, Guatemala, El Salvador.
	M. olmec	Pérez-Higareda, H.M. Smith & Juliá-Zertuche, 1985	0	Tuxtlan jumping pit viper	Mexico on the upper slopes of the Sierra de Los Tuxtlas in southern Veracruz.

*) Not including the nominate subspecies.
^{T}) Type species.
