= Peterson Occénat =

Haitian footballer (born 1989)

Personal information
- Date of birth: December 3, 1989 (age 36)
- Place of birth: Jérémie, Haiti
- Height: 1.80 m (5 ft 11 in)
- Position: Goalkeeper

Team information
- Current team: Miami United
- Number: 1

Senior career*
| Years | Team | Apps | (Gls) |
| 2007 | Violette | 27 | (0) |
| 2008 | Racing CH | 97 | (0) |
| 2009–2013 | Aigle Noir | 12 | (0) |
| 2014–2017 | Miami Fusion | 12 | (0) |
| 2018– | Miami United | | |

International career
- Haiti U17
- Haiti U20
- Haiti U23
| 2010– | Haiti | 10 | (0) |
- * Club domestic league appearances and goals

Peterson Occénat (born 3 December 1989) is a Haitian association football goalkeeper who currently plays for Miami United in the National Premier Soccer League.

== Club career ==
Occénat started his professional career with Violette and then made transfers to other Port-au-Prince-based clubs Racing CH and Aigle Noir. In 2014, he emigrated to the United States to play for the fourth-tier Miami United.

== International career ==
At the youth level he played in the 2005 CONCACAF U17 Tournament, the 2007 CONCACAF U-20 Championships and the 2008 CONCACAF Men's Pre-Olympic Tournament.

Occénat played his first senior international game with the senior national team on 5 May 2010 in and against Argentina (4–0), after he came on as a substitute for his colleague Dominique Jean-Zéphirin in the 55th minute of that game.
