= Denis Espinoza =

Nicaraguan footballer (born 1983)

Personal information
- Full name: Denis Jesús Espinoza Camacho
- Date of birth: August 25, 1983 (age 43)
- Place of birth: San Marcos, Nicaragua
- Height: 1.81 m (5 ft 11 in)
- Position: Goalkeeper

Team information
- Current team: San Marcos
- Number: 1

Senior career*
Years	Team	Apps	(Gls)
2003–2004	San Marcos		
2004–2008	Diriangén		
2008–2024	Walter Ferretti	418	(2)
2024	UNAN	15	(0)
2025	San Marcos	37	(0)

International career
2004–	Nicaragua	40	(1)
- * Club domestic league appearances and goals

Denis Jesús Espinoza Camacho (born August 25, 1983) is a Nicaraguan footballer who plays as a goalkeeper for Deportivo Walter Ferretti.

== Club career ==
Nicknamed el Pulpo (the Octopus), Espinoza started his career at hometown club San Marcos before moving to top club Diriangén. In 2008, he joined Walter Ferretti where he became the team captain. He holds the record for the longest stretch (747 minutes) without allowing any goals in the primera division of Nicaragua, set during 2014 Apertura season.

== International career ==
Espinoza made his debut for Nicaragua in an April 2004 friendly match against Bermuda and has, as of December 2013, earned a total of 33 caps, scoring 1 goal. He has represented his country in 6 FIFA World Cup qualification matches and played at the 2005, 2007, 2009, 2011 and 2013 UNCAF Nations Cups, as well as at the 2009 CONCACAF Gold Cup.

== Personal life ==
Espinoza is married to Yira Meléndez and they have two children, Denis and Cristiana. They live in his hometown, San Marcos.

== Career statistics ==
No.	Date	Venue	Opponent	Score	Result	Competition
1	18 January 2011	Estadio Rommel Fernández, Panama City, Panama	Belize	1–0	1–1	2011 Copa Centroamericana
