= Brian Calabrese =

Argentine footballer

Personal information
- Date of birth: 17 April 1996 (age 30)
- Place of birth: Argentina
- Positions: Winger; forward

Team information
- Current team: FC San Marcos

Senior career*
Years	Team	Apps	(Gls)
2014	Central Córdoba (Rosario)	1	(0)
2015	General Rojo	8	(1)
2016	Olimpo	0	(0)
2016–2017	Ferro Carril Oeste (General Pico)		
2018	Pantoja		
2019–2020	Mirbat		
2020–2021	Villa Mitre	2	(0)
2021	Walter Ferretti	21	(18)
2022	San Carlos	9	(2)
2022	Águila	1	(1)
2022	Guanacasteca	7	(1)
2023	Managua	19	(9)
2023	Academia Cantolao	14	(2)
2024	C.D. Victoria	5	(0)
2024	ADA Jaén	5	(0)
2024–2025	Ciudad Bolívar	14	(1)
2025	Guaireña F.C.	12	(2)
2025-	FC San Marcos		
- * Club domestic league appearances and goals as of 7 January 2026

Brian Calabrese (born 17 April 1996) is an Argentine footballer who plays as a winger or attacker for FC San Marcos in the Nicaraguan Premier Division.

== Career ==
In 2014, Calabrese signed for Argentine fourth division side Central Córdoba (Rosario). Before the 2016 season, he signed for Olimpo in the Argentine top flight. In 2016, he signed for Argentine third division club Ferro Carril Oeste (General Pico). Before the 2018 season, Calabrese signed for Pantoja in the Dominican Republic. In 2019, he signed for Omani team Mirbat, where he was unpaid for 7 months and said, "A normal day is 40 °, it's hell. At the beginning we trained at 6:30 p.m. and then we went to training at 7:00 p.m. The debut match was postponed three times due to high temperatures." In 2020, Calabrese signed for Villa Mitre in Argentina. In 2021, he signed for Nicaraguan outfit Walter Ferretti. After playing in Ciudad Bolívar, Guaireña F.C., in July 2025 he became a player for FC San Marcos.
