= Guy-Michel Nisas =

Martiniquais football manager

Personal information
- Place of birth: Martinique

Managerial career
- Years: Team
- 2007–2011: Martinique

Guy-Michel Nisas is a Martiniquais professional football manager.

== Career ==
Since 2007 until 2011 he coached the Martinique national football team.
