= Herber Barrera =

Salvadoran footballer (born 1987)

Personal information
- Full name: Herber Antonio Barrera Romero
- Date of birth: April 28, 1987 (age 39)
- Place of birth: Usulután, El Salvador
- Height: 1.74 m (5 ft 9 in)
- Position: Forward

Senior career*
Years	Team	Apps	(Gls)
2002–2006	Topiltzín		
2007	Espíritu Santo	?	(36)
2008–2010	Luís Ángel Firpo	41	(10)

International career^{‡}
2009	El Salvador	1	(0)
- * Club domestic league appearances and goals ‡ National team caps and goals as of 10 July 2009

Herber Antonio Barrera Romero (born April 28, 1987) is a Salvadoran footballer.

== Club career ==
Barrera started his career at third division side Topiltzín, with whom he clinched promotion to the Second division in 2005. In 2007, he stepped back to the third division and joined Espíritu Santo and made his debut in the Primera División de Fútbol de El Salvador with Luís Ángel Firpo in 2008. In summer 2010 he was out of contract with Firpo, with Atletico Balboa and Atletico Marte interested, but Barrera rejected Balboa and Marte did not have the money to sign him.

== International career ==
Barrera made his debut for El Salvador in a July 2009 CONCACAF Gold Cup match against Canada, coming on as a late substitute for Williams Reyes. As of January 2011, this has been his only international match.
