= Rodrigue César =

Martiniquais footballer (born 1988)

Personal information
- Full name: Rodrigue Maxime César
- Date of birth: 14 April 1988 (age 38)
- Place of birth: Ducos, Martinique
- Height: 1.85 m (6 ft 1 in)
- Position: Midfielder

Team information
- Current team: Colonial
- Number: 10

Youth career
- 2005—2007: F.E.P. Monesie

Senior career*
Years	Team	Apps	(Gls)
2008–2009	US Robert		
2009–2010	C.O.T.V.		
2010–2012	Istres	1	(0)
2012–2016	Béziers	95	(3)
2016–2018	Agde	18	(3)
2018–	Colonial	26	(2)

International career
2010	Martinique	3	(0)
- * Club domestic league appearances and goals as of 19 June 2017 (UTC)

Rodrigue César (born 14 April 1988) is a Martiniquais footballer who plays as a midfielder for Colonial of the Martinique Championnat National.

== Club career ==
In 2008, César signed with Martinique club US Robert. In 2010, he signed with French Ligue 2 side Istres and made his debut on 12 November against Vannes OC.

== International career ==
César is a member of the Martinique football team. He made his debut on 26 November 2010 in a 2010 Caribbean Championship match against Grenada. He played three times for Martinique.
