= Derrick Carter (footballer) =

Guyanese footballer (born 1982)

Personal information
- Full name: Derrick O'Neil Carter
- Date of birth: 16 September 1982 (age 44)
- Place of birth: Georgetown, Guyana
- Height: 1.85 m (6 ft 1 in)
- Position: Goalkeeper

Team information
- Current team: Fruta Conquerors
- Number: 22

Senior career*
Years	Team	Apps	(Gls)
2000–	Western Tigers FC	150	(0)
2015	Georgetown FC		
2016	Fruta Conquerors		

International career^{‡}
2006–	Guyana	6	(0)
- * Club domestic league appearances and goals as of 20 October 2012 ‡ National team caps and goals as of 2 May 2011

Derrick Carter is a Guyana footballer who currently plays for Fruta Conquerors in the Guyana National Football League and the Guyana national team.
