= Euon Brown =

Grenadian footballer

Personal information
- Date of birth: 9 July 1987 (age 39)
- Place of birth: London, England
- Position: Midfielder

Senior career*
| Years | Team | Apps | (Gls) |
| 2009–2010 | Sevenoaks Town | | |

International career^{‡}
| 2009 | Grenada | 1 | (0) |
- * Club domestic league appearances and goals as of 03:44, 6 July 2021 (UTC) ‡ National team caps and goals as of 03:44, 6 July 2021 (UTC)

Euon Brown (born 9 July 1987) is a retired footballer who played as a midfielder. Born in England, he played for the Grenada national team.

== International career ==
Brown appeared for Grenada at the 2009 CONCACAF Gold Cup, making his only appearance in a 4–0 loss to Honduras on 11 July 2009.

== Outside football ==
Brown retired from football in 2012, as injuries halted his career. He worked learning and performance officer, a data analyst, and a principal policy and projects officer. He is the Support for Families programme manager for the Troubled Families programme in England.
