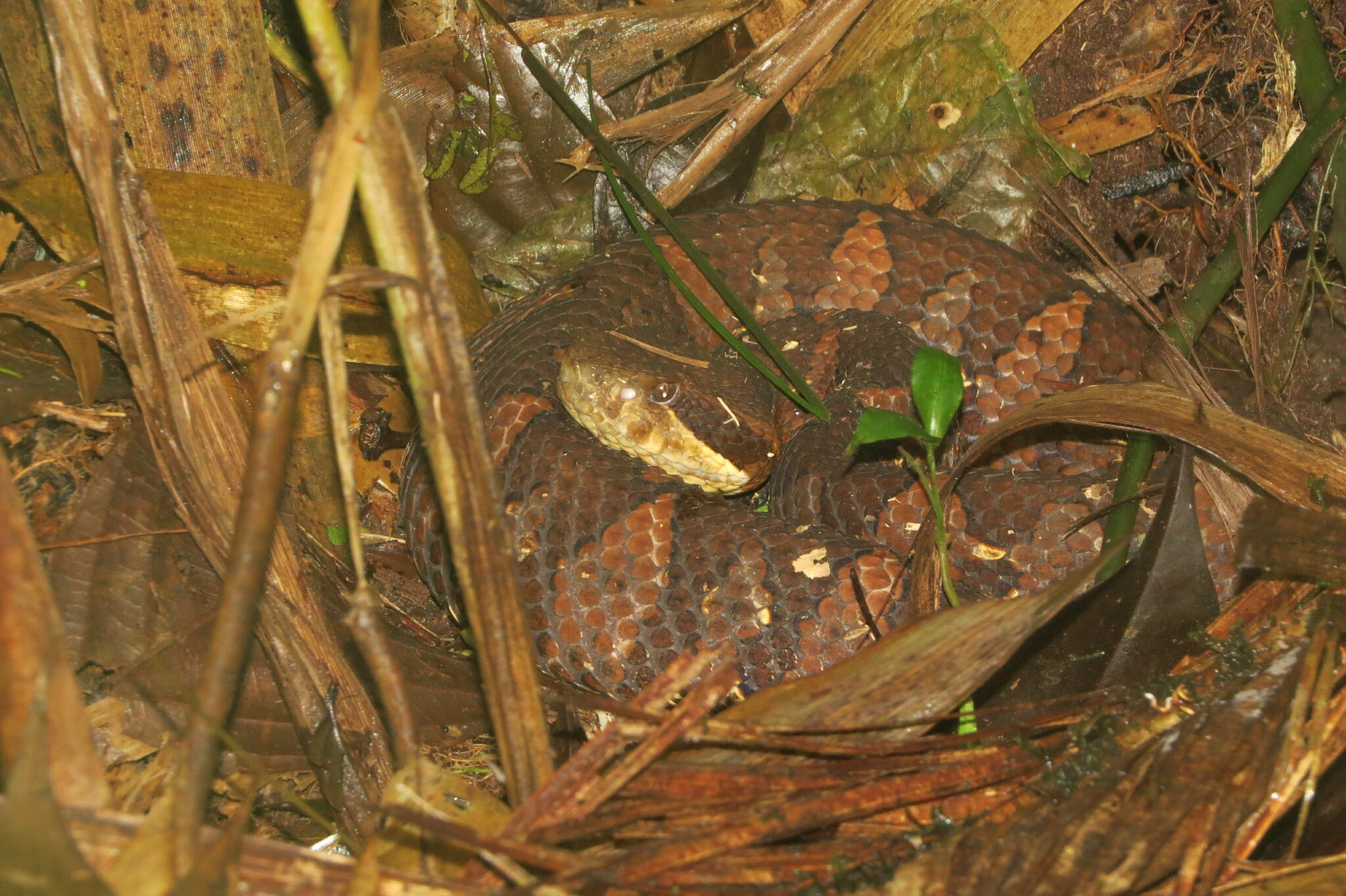
- Atropoides picadoi

Conservation status
- Least Concern (IUCN 3.1)

Scientific classification
- Kingdom: Animalia
- Phylum: Chordata
- Class: Reptilia
- Order: Squamata
- Suborder: Serpentes
- Family: Viperidae
- Genus: Atropoides
- Species: A. picadoi

Binomial name
- Atropoides picadoi (Dunn, 1939)

Synonyms
- Trimeresurus nummifer picadoi Dunn, 1939; Bothrops picadoi — H.M. Smith & Taylor, 1945; Porthidium picadoi — Campbell & Lamar, 1989; A[tropoides]. picadoi — Werman, 1992

= Atropoides =

Genus of snakes

Atropoides picadoi, also known as Picado's jumping pit viper, is a pit viper species in the subfamily Crotalinae of the family Viperidae. The species is endemic to Costa Rica. There are no subspecies that are recognised as being valid. It is monotypic in the genus Atropoides.

== Etymology ==
The specific name, picadoi, is in honor of Costa Rican herpetologist Clodomiro Picado Twight.

== Description ==
Adults of A. picadoi commonly reach a total length (including tail) of 75–95 cm (2.46–3.12 ft) with a maximum of 120.2 cm (3.94 ft). A. picadoi is extremely stout, though not quite so much as A. mexicanus.

== Geographic range ==
Atropoides picadoi is found in the mountains of Costa Rica and western Panama at 50–1,500 m (160–4,920 ft) altitude. Its geographic range includes the Cordillera de Tilarán, the Cordillera Central, and the Cordillera de Talamanca. The type locality given is "La Palma, [San José Province], Costa Rica, 4500 feet".
