= Dominique Jean-Zéphirin =

Haitian-French footballer (born 1982)

Personal information
- Full name: Dominique Jean-Zéphirin
- Date of birth: 3 June 1982 (age 44)
- Place of birth: Nice, France
- Height: 1.80 m (5 ft 11 in)
- Position: Goalkeeper

Senior career*
Years	Team	Apps	(Gls)
2000–2001	Nice	0	(0)
2001–2002	Hampton & Richmond Borough		
2002–2003	Slough Town	34	(0)
2003	Aylesbury United	1	(0)
2003–2004	Lewes		
2004–2005	Dover Athletic	9	(0)
2005	AFC Wimbledon	0	(0)
2005	Farnborough Town	0	(0)
2005–2007	Nice B	11	(0)
2007–2009	Étoile Fréjus Saint-Raphaël	18	(0)
2009–2010	ROS Menton		
2010	Farnborough	8	(0)
2010	→ Slough Town (loan)	1	(0)
2010–2011	Slough Town	2	(0)
2011–2013	Staines Town		
2013–2014	Étoile Fréjus Saint-Raphaël		

International career
2008–2014	Haiti	16	(0)
- * Club domestic league appearances and goals

Dominique Jean-Zéphirin (born 3 June 1982) is a Haitian-French former footballer who played as a goalkeeper. His last known club was Étoile Fréjus Saint-Raphaël.

Between 2008 and 2014, he won 16 caps for the Haiti national football team.

== Personal life ==
He is Liz Milian's husband and they have a baby boy recently January 19, 2017 his name is Layvin. Liz Milian is the sister of singer Christina Milian and features in season 2 of the TV show Christina Milian Turned Up. his divorced and now in couple with Sandra Évra ex wife of French football player Patrice Évra
