= Metlapilcoatlus occiduus =

Conservation status
- Least Concern (IUCN 3.1)

Scientific classification
- Kingdom: Animalia
- Phylum: Chordata
- Class: Reptilia
- Order: Squamata
- Suborder: Serpentes
- Family: Viperidae
- Genus: Metlapilcoatlus
- Species: M. occiduus

Binomial name
- Metlapilcoatlus occiduus (Hoge, 1966)

Synonyms
- Bothrops affinis Bocourt, 1868; Bothriopsis affinis – Cope, 1871; Trigonocephalus affinis – Garman, 1884; Bothrops nummifer affinis – Stuart, 1963; Bothrops nummifer occiduus Hoge, 1966 (replacement name for Bothrops affinis Bocourt, 1868); Bothrops nummifer occiduus – Hoge & Romano-Hoge, 1981; Porthidium nummifer occiduum – Campbell & Lamar, 1989

Species of snake

Common names: Guatemalan jumping pit viper.

Metlapilcoatlus occiduus is a pit viper subspecies endemic to southern Mexico, Guatemala, and El Salvador.

== Description ==
Adults are usually 35–60 cm (13 3/4–23 5/8 in) in total length. The largest specimens reported are a male of 74.8 cm (29 1/2 in) from Baja Verapaz, Guatemala, and a female of 79.5 cm (31 1/4 in) from Volcán de Agua, Escuintla, Guatemala. The build is very stout, although not so much as that of M. mexicanus.

== Geographic range ==
Found in southern Mexico (southeastern Chiapas), southern and central Guatemala, and western El Salvador. The type locality given is "Saint-Augustín (Guatemala), versant occidentale de la Córdillère. 610 mètres [2,000 ft] d´altitude". Actually, San Augustín is on the southern slope of Volcán Atitlán.

== Habitat ==
Its habitat includes subtropical wet forest on the Pacific versant from southeastern Chiapas, Mexico to western El Salvador. It also inhabits the pine-oak forest near Guatemala City. It can be found at altitudes varying from 1,000–1,600 m (3,300–5,200 ft).

== Taxonomy ==
Regarded as a full species, Metlapilcoatlus occiduus, by Campbell and Lamar (2004).
