= Nasorostral scale =

In reptiles, the nasorostral is an enlarged and usually paired scale, just behind the rostral (and in front of the nasal scale).

== Related scales ==
- Rostral scale
- Nasal scale

== See also ==
- Snake scales
