= San Marcos, Carazo =

San Marcos
- Municipality
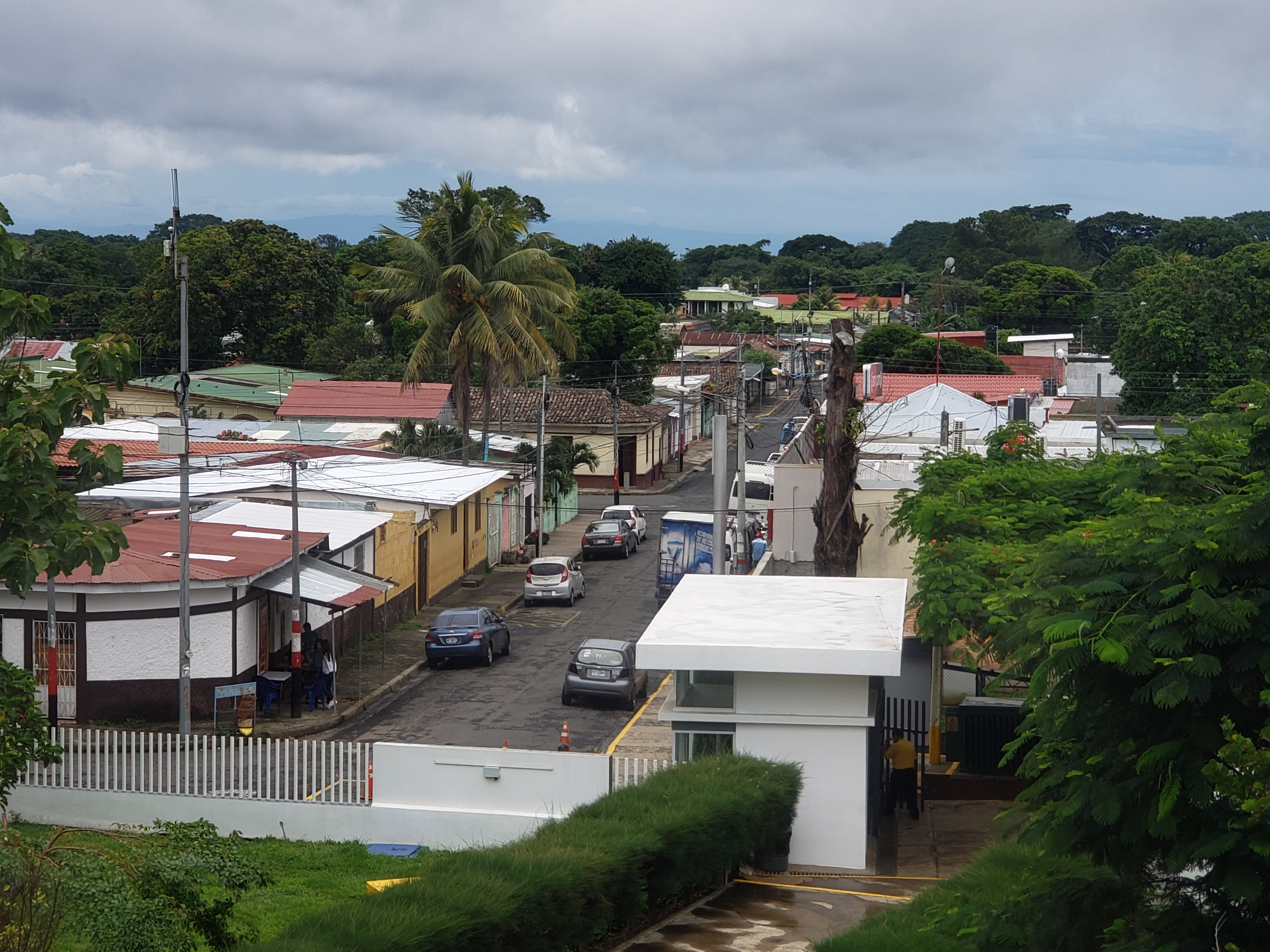
- San Marcos, Carazo in 2019

- Location in Nicaragua
- Coordinates: 11°55′N 86°12′W
- Country: Nicaragua
- Department: Carazo

Area
  - Municipality: 46 sq mi (118 km^{2})

Population (2022 estimate)
  - Municipality: 33,303
  - Density: 731/sq mi (282/km^{2})
  - Urban: 21,895

San Marcos is a town and a municipality in the Carazo Department of Nicaragua. It is located 45 km (28 mi) south of the capital Managua. The municipality has a population of 33,303 (2022 estimate).

San Marcos' climate enables the production of coffee and a large variety of tropical flowers and fruits.

== Religion ==
San Marcos' inhabitants are a Catholic majority, a heritage of the Spaniard Colonization. They are fervent followers of the Spaniard Catholic Traditions. For example, the most notorious festivity, where many people gather every year, is the celebration of their Patron San Marcos. San Marcos' Catholic Parish Church, in the middle of the town square, is a legacy of the Spaniard influence, as could be seen in its construction and designs.

== Economy ==
The economy of San Marcos is primarily agricultural, with its major exports being coffee, citrus fruit, beans, and maize.

== Education ==
San Marcos is host to Keiser University-Latin American Campus, a campus of Keiser University, headquartered in Fort Lauderdale, Florida, USA. The campus is the only U.S. accredited institution of higher education in all of Nicaragua. Founded in 1993, over its lifetime, more than 1200 people have graduated from the campus.

They have set an international standard of professional and academic success. Receiving students from all over Central America and the United States, Keiser University Latin American Campus occupies the building where the famous Normal de Señoritas Salvadora de Somoza was located. This was an institution that educated young girls to become elementary school teachers. It was also the host of students from all over the country and Central America. The campus encompasses over 740,000 square feet including green areas and athletic field. It has 23 classrooms, a library and auditorium, campus dining facilities, modern computer and science laboratories, spacious dormitories, faculty offices, fitness center, administrative buildings, student services building, conference center, and a 300-person chapel, La Purísima.

== Notable people from San Marcos ==
San Marcos is the birthplace of Clodomiro Picado Twight (1887–1944), a Pasteur Institute scientist whose work on molds was a precursor to the formal discovery of penicillin.

Anastasio Somoza García (1 February 1896 – 29 September 1956), the leader of Nicaragua from 1937 until his assassination in 1956, was from San Marcos. He was only officially the 21st President of Nicaragua from 1 January 1937 to 1 May 1947 and from 21 May 1950 until his assassination on 29 September 1956, ruling for the rest of the time as an unelected military strongman. He was the patriarch of the Somoza family, which ruled Nicaragua as a hereditary dictatorship for 42 years.

== Twin towns – sister cities ==
San Marcos is twinned with:

- Biel/Bienne, Switzerland
- Helmond, Netherlands
- Jena, Germany
