= Rimmel Daniel =

Grenadian footballer

Personal information
- Full name: Rimmel Johnny Daniel
- Date of birth: 28 January 1991 (age 35)
- Place of birth: London, England
- Position: Defender

Team information
- Current team: Grays Athletic

Youth career
- 2007–2010: Gillingham

Senior career*
Years	Team	Apps	(Gls)
2010	Waltham Forest	6	(0)
2011–2012	Aveley	0	(0)
2012–2013	Hornchurch	?	(?)
2013–2015	Tilbury	64	(5)
2015–20??	Waltham Abbey		
2022	Grays Athletic	6	(0)

International career^{‡}
- Grenada U17
- Grenada U20
2009–2010	Grenada	5	(1)
- * Club domestic league appearances and goals as of 13 June 2023 ‡ National team caps and goals as of 12 October 2011

Rimmel Johnny Daniel (born 28 January 1991) is a Grenadian footballer who last played for Grays Athletic.

== Career ==
=== Club ===
Daniel is a former youth team player with Gillingham who played as a defender. Daniel made six appearances for Waltham Forest in 2010 in the Isthmian League Division One North.

=== International ===
Daniel played for Grenada under-20's, and scored eight goals in Grenada's 17–0 win over British Virgin Islands in May 2008.

He made his debut for Grenada's senior national team in a warm-up match before the 2009 CONCACAF Gold Cup against Antigua and Barbuda on 1 July 2009 and marked the occasion with a goal. He was included in the squad for that tournament, playing as a substitute in two of Grenada's three group B games.
