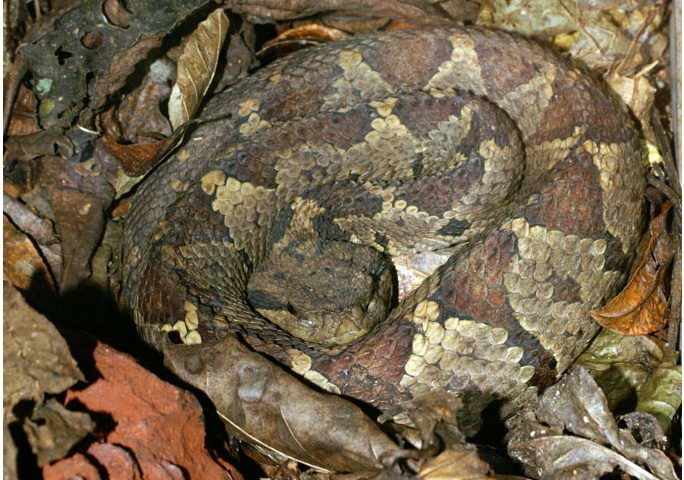

Conservation status
- Least Concern (IUCN 3.1)

Scientific classification
- Kingdom: Animalia
- Phylum: Chordata
- Class: Reptilia
- Order: Squamata
- Suborder: Serpentes
- Family: Viperidae
- Genus: Metlapilcoatlus
- Species: M. mexicanus

Binomial name
- Metlapilcoatlus mexicanus (A.M.C. Duméril, Bibron, & A.H.A. Duméril, 1854)

Synonyms
- Atropos Mexicanus A.M.C. Duméril, Bibron & A.H.A. Duméril, 1854; Bothriechis mexicanus – Cope, 1861; Bothriopsis mexicanus – Cope, 1871; Bothriechis nummifera var. notata Fischer, 1880; Bothrops mexicanus – F. Müller, 1880; Teleuraspis mexicanus – Cope, 1887; Bothrops nummifer mexicanus – Mertens, 1952; Porthidium nummifer mexicanum – Campbell & Lamar, 1989; Atropoides nummifer mexicana – Campbell & Brodie, 1992

= Metlapilcoatlus mexicanus =

Species of snake

Common names: Central American jumping pit viper.

Metlapilcoatlus mexicanus is a pit viper species endemic to Mexico and Central America.

== Description ==
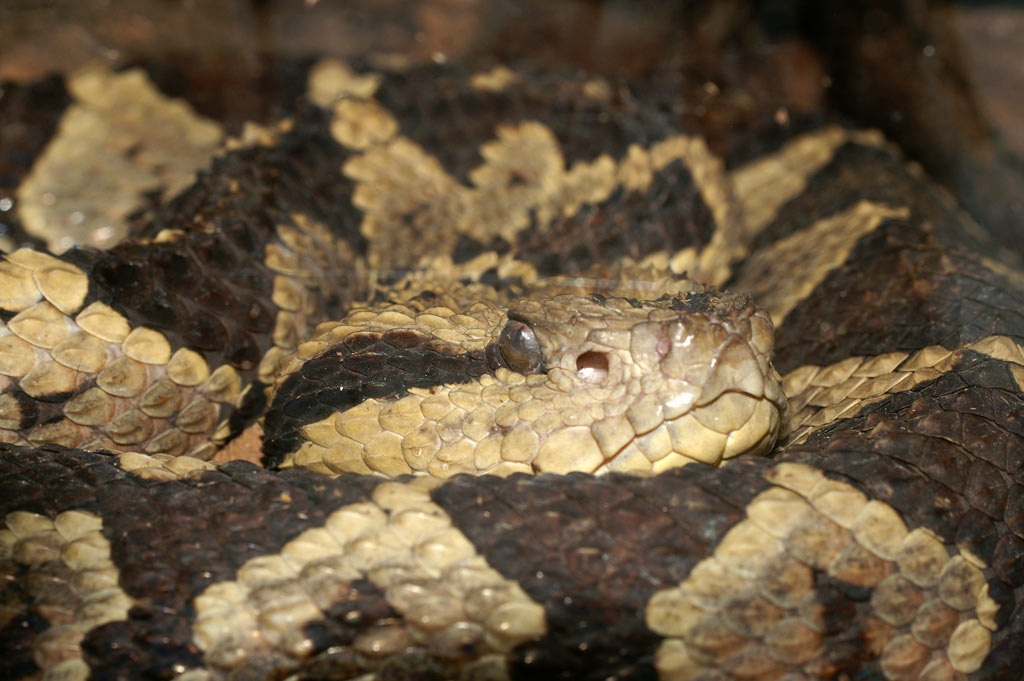
M. mexicanus, Dominical, Costa Rica.

Adults grow to an average of 50–70 cm (about 20–28 inches) in total length. The maximum total length is 86.7 cm (34 1/8 in) for males and 97.9 cm (38 1/2 in) for females. The body is extremely stout.

== Geographic range ==
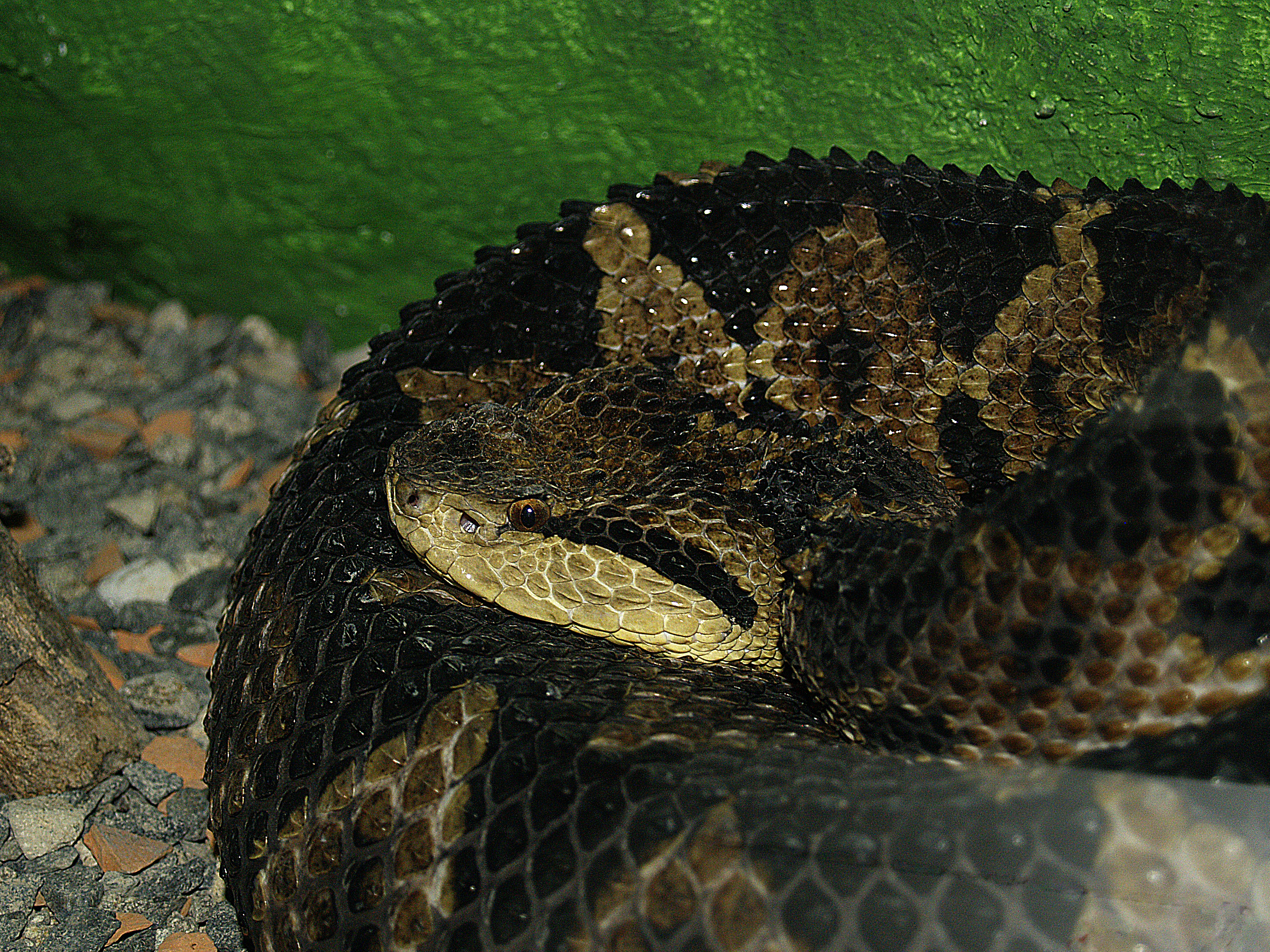
Central American jumping pitviper. Mano de piedra. ( Metlapilcoatlus mexicanus)

Found in the Atlantic drainage from Mexico (in the Mexican states of Tabasco and Chiapas) south to the Canal Zone in Panama, both slopes of Costa Rica and Panama. Occurs at elevations of 40–1,600 m (130–5,250 ft). The type locality given is "Coban, capitale de la province de la Véra-Paz, (République de Guatemala, Amérique centrale)" (Cobán, Alta Verapaz, Guatemala).

== Taxonomy ==
Regarded as a full species, Metlapilcoatlus mexicanus, by Campbell and Lamar (2004).
