= Andray Baptiste =

Grenadian international footballer

Personal information
- Date of birth: 15 April 1977 (age 49)
- Place of birth: Grenada
- Position: Goalkeeper

Senior career*
Years	Team	Apps	(Gls)
- Police SC
- London Benfica
2008–2010	Harrow Borough	44	(0)
- Ashford Town (dual forms)

International career^{‡}
2002–2011	Grenada	15	(0)
- * Club domestic league appearances and goals as of 10:22, 7 September 2009 (UTC) ‡ National team caps and goals as of 18:46, 10 May 2022 (UTC)

Andray Baptiste (born 15 April 1977) is a Grenadian former international footballer who played as a goalkeeper.

He played for English side Harrow Borough, Police SC and London Benfica. He also spend some time at Ashford Town on dual forms whilst at Harrow Borough.
