= United States men's national soccer team =

Men's national soccer team representing United States

United States of America
- Nickname(s): USMNT; The Stars and Stripes; The Yanks
- Association: United States Soccer Federation (USSF)
- Confederation: CONCACAF (North America)
- Sub-confederation: NAFU (North America)
- Head coach: Vacant
- Captain: Tyler Adams
- Most caps: Cobi Jones (164)
- Top scorer: Clint Dempsey (57); Landon Donovan (57)
- Home stadium: Various
- FIFA code: USA
First colors	Second colors

FIFA ranking
- Current: 16 (November 18, 2026)
- Highest: 4 (April 2006)
- Lowest: 36 (July 2012)

First international
- Sweden 2–3 United States (Stockholm, Sweden; August 20, 1916)

Biggest win
- United States 8–0 Barbados (Carson, United States; June 15, 2008)

Biggest defeat
- Norway 11–0 United States (Oslo, Norway; August 6, 1948)

World Cup
- Appearances: 12 (first in 1930)
- Best result: Third place (1930)

Olympic Games
- Appearances: 10 (first in 1904)
- Best result: Silver (1904) (Note: Medal recognized by IOC, but not by FIFA.)

CONCACAF Championship / Gold Cup
- Appearances: 20 (first in 1985)
- Best result: Champions (1991, 2002, 2005, 2007, 2013, 2017, 2021)

CONCACAF Nations League
- Appearances: 4 (first in 2019–20)
- Best result: Champions (2021, 2023, 2024)

Copa América
- Appearances: 5 (first in 1993)
- Best result: Fourth place (1995, 2016)

Confederations Cup
- Appearances: 4 (first in 1992)
- Best result: Runners-up (2009)
Medal record
FIFA World Cup
Bronze medal – third place	1930 Uruguay	Team
FIFA Confederations Cup
Silver medal – second place	2009 South Africa	Team
Bronze medal – third place	1992 Saudi Arabia	Team
Bronze medal – third place	1999 Mexico	Team
Olympic Games (Note: These medals are recognized by IOC, but not by FIFA.)
Silver medal – second place	1904 St. Louis	Team
Bronze medal – third place	1904 St. Louis	Team
CONCACAF Championship / Gold Cup
Gold medal – first place	1991 United States	Team
Gold medal – first place	2002 United States	Team
Gold medal – first place	2005 United States	Team
Gold medal – first place	2007 United States	Team
Gold medal – first place	2013 United States	Team
Gold medal – first place	2017 United States	Team
Gold medal – first place	2021 United States	Team
Silver medal – second place	1989 North America	Team
Silver medal – second place	1993 United States and Mexico	Team
Silver medal – second place	1998 United States	Team
Silver medal – second place	2009 United States	Team
Silver medal – second place	2011 United States	Team
Silver medal – second place	2019 United States, Costa Rica and Jamaica	Team
Silver medal – second place	2025 United States and Canada	Team
Bronze medal – third place	1996 United States	Team
Bronze medal – third place	2003 United States and Mexico	Team
CONCACAF Nations League
Gold medal – first place	2021 United States	Team
Gold medal – first place	2023 United States	Team
Gold medal – first place	2024 United States	Team
CONCACAF Cup
Silver medal – second place	2015 United States	Team
NAFC Championship
Silver medal – second place	1949 Mexico	Team
Bronze medal – third place	1947 Cuba	Team
North American Nations Cup
Silver medal – second place	1991 United States	Team
- Website: USMNT

The United States men's national soccer team (USMNT), officially designated as USA by FIFA, represents the United States in men's international soccer, and is governed by the United States Soccer Federation founded in 1913. It has been a full member of FIFA since 1914, is a founding member of CONCACAF which was founded in 1961, and is also a member of NAFU in the North American Zone. From 1946 to 1961, the team was a member of NAFC, the former governing body of soccer in North America and a direct predecessor confederation of CONCACAF. The United States was also a member of PFC, the former unified confederation of the Americas.

The United States has qualified for the FIFA World Cup twelve times. It is one of five CONCACAF teams to have advanced to the knockout stage, finishing as third place in 1930, reaching the quarterfinals in 2002, and also reaching the round of 16 in seven editions, six of them since 1994. Their third place finish in Uruguay 1930 is the best result by a CONCACAF team in the competition and is the only non-European or South American team to achieve a World Cup podium finish. They returned in 1934 and 1950, defeating England 1–0 in the latter, but did not qualify again until 1990. As host in 1994, the U.S. received an automatic berth and lost to Brazil in the round of 16. They qualified for the next five World Cups, a feat shared with only seven other nations. The United States have hosted the 2026 FIFA World Cup, with Mexico and Canada as co-hosts. It has qualified for the FIFA Confederations Cup four times, finishing as runners-up in 2009, defeating top ranked European champions Spain 2–0 in the semifinal and losing to Brazil in the final, and also finishing as third place twice.

The United States has participated twenty times in CONCACAF's premier continental competition. It is the second most successful team in its confederation, winning 10 CONCACAF continental titles (seven CONCACAF Gold Cup titles and three CONCACAF Nations League titles). The team has participated five times in the Copa América; hosting the 2016 and 2024 editions, and finished as fourth place twice in 1995 and 2016. In defunct subcontinental competitions, the team finished as runners-up in the NAFC Championship in 1949, and also finished as runners-up in the North American Nations Cup as hosts in 1991.

== History ==
=== Early years ===
A first United States national soccer team (controlled by the American Football Association, established 1884) was constituted on November 28, 1885, when it played Canada in the first international match held outside the United Kingdom. Canada defeated the U.S. 1–0 at Clark Field in the East Newark neighborhood of Kearny, New Jersey. A second match in East Newark the following year resulted in the U.S. defeating Canada 1–0, although neither match was officially recognized. The U.S. earned both silver and bronze medals in men's tournament at the 1904 Summer Olympics in St. Louis through Christian Brothers College and St. Rose Parish, though the tournament is declared official only by the IOC; FIFA does not endorse tournaments held before 1908.

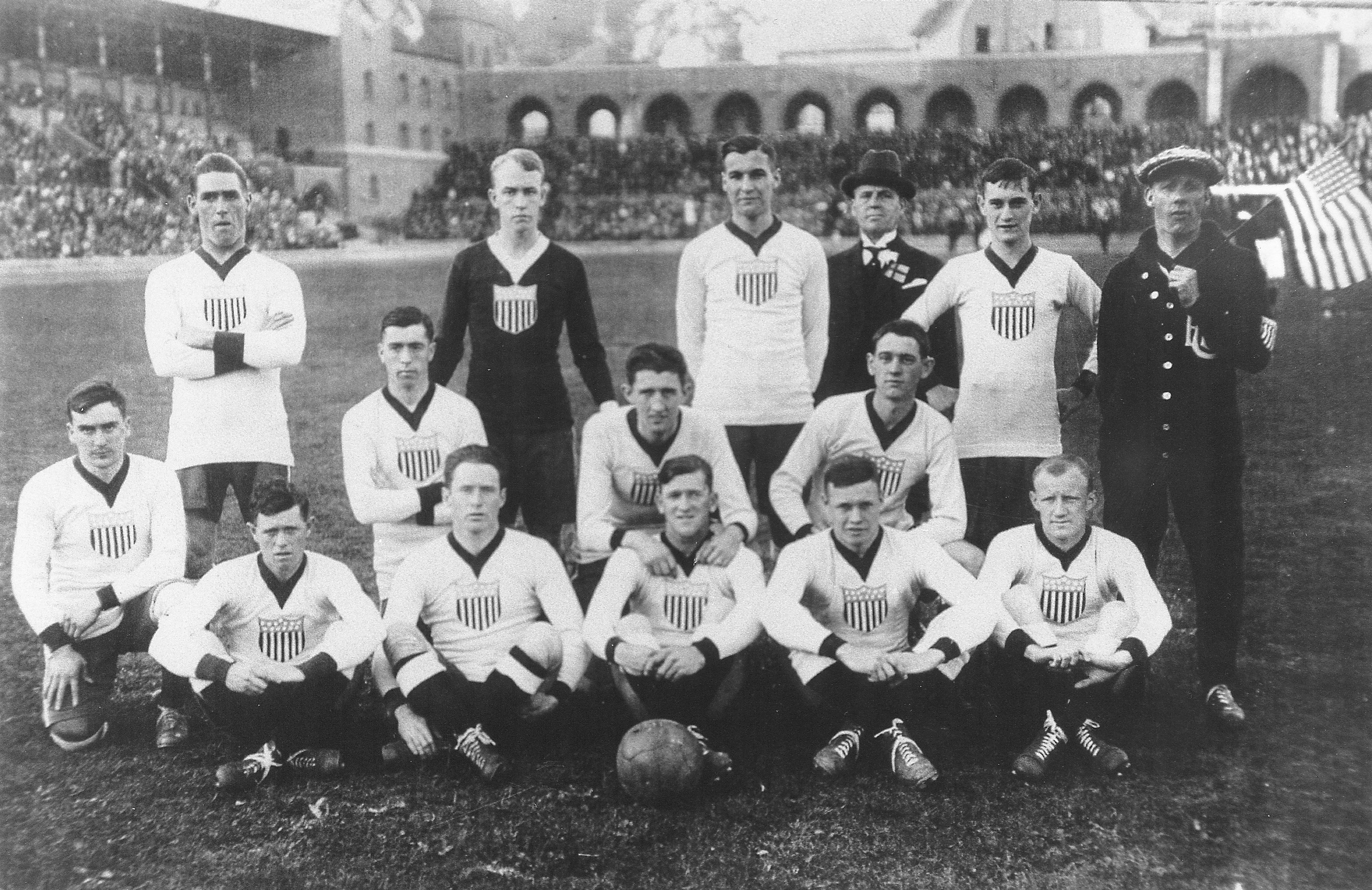
The first official U.S. formation in 1916, Stockholm Olympic Stadium, Sweden

The U.S. played its first official international match under the auspices of U.S. Soccer on August 20, 1916, at Stockholm Olympic Stadium, defeating Sweden 3–2. The U.S. fielded a team in the 1930 World Cup in Uruguay, the first edition of the World Cup. The U.S. began group play by beating Belgium 3–0, and then earned a 3–0 victory over Paraguay, with FIFA crediting Bert Patenaude with two of the goals. In November 2006, FIFA announced that it had accepted evidence that Patenaude scored all three goals against Paraguay, and was thus the first person to score a hat-trick in a World Cup. In the semifinals, the U.S. lost to Argentina 6–1 and were eliminated. There was no third place game; however, using the overall tournament records in 1986, FIFA credited the Americans with a third-place finish ahead of fellow semifinalist Yugoslavia. This remains the U.S. team's best World Cup result, and is the highest finish of any team from outside of South America and Europe.

The U.S. qualified for the 1934 World Cup by defeating Mexico 4–2 in Italy a few days before the tournament opened. In a straight knock-out format, the team first played host Italy and lost 7–1, eliminating the U.S. from the tournament. At the 1936 Olympic Games in Berlin, the U.S. lost 1–0 to Italy in the first round and were eliminated. Italy went on to win both tournaments.

The 1950 World Cup in Brazil was the next World Cup appearance for the United States, as it withdrew in 1938 and the tournament was not held again until 1950 due to World War II. The U.S. lost its first match 3–1 against Spain, but then won 1–0 against England at Independência Stadium in Belo Horizonte. Striker Joe Gaetjens was the lone goalscorer in the match, which was called "The Miracle on Grass" and considered one of the greatest upsets in the history of the World Cup. The U.S. were eliminated from the tournament in their third game, a 5–2 defeat to Chile.

=== 1960s–1980s ===
The national team spent the mid-to-late 20th century in near complete irrelevance in both the international game and the domestic sporting scene. CONCACAF had only one World Cup berth until 1982. Playing only two matches from 1981 to 1983, U.S. Soccer targeted the 1984 Summer Olympics in Los Angeles and the 1986 World Cup to rebuild the national team and its fan base. The International Olympic Committee declared that teams from outside Europe and South America could field full senior teams. The U.S. finished with a 1–1–1 record in the group stage of the tournament but did not qualify for the second round, losing to Egypt on a tiebreaker.

To provide a more stable national team program and renew interest in the North American Soccer League, U.S. Soccer entered the national team into the NASL league schedule for the 1983 season as Team America. This team lacked the continuity and regularity of training that conventional clubs enjoy, and many players were unwilling to play for the national team instead of their own clubs when conflicts arose. Team America finished the season at the bottom of the league, with U.S. Soccer canceling the experiment and withdrawing the national team from the NASL after one season. By the end of 1984, the NASL had folded, leaving the U.S. without a single professional-level outdoor soccer league.

The 1986 World Cup was hosted by Mexico after Colombia withdrew from contention due to economic concerns and the United States lost their subsequent bid to host. In the last game of CONCACAF qualifying for the 1986 World Cup, the U.S. needed only a tie against Costa Rica to reach the final qualification group against Honduras and Canada. U.S. Soccer scheduled the game to be played in Torrance, California, an area with many Costa Rican expatriates, and marketed the game almost exclusively to the Costa Rican community. Costa Rica won the match 1–0, and kept the U.S. from reaching its fourth World Cup finals.

=== 1990s ===
On July 4, 1988, FIFA named the U.S. as the host of the 1994 World Cup under significant international criticism given the perceived weakness of the national team and the lack of a professional outdoor league. The success of the 1984 Olympics played a role in FIFA's decision. The U.S. qualified for the 1990 World Cup with a 1–0 win against Trinidad and Tobago in the last match of the 1989 CONCACAF Championship. Mexico had been disqualified from the CONCACAF Championship for using ineligible players in a youth tournament, which allowed a chance for the U.S. to qualify for their first World Cup in 40 years.

The team was coached by Bob Gansler, Wisconsin-Milwaukee and U20 national team coach, in preparation for the 1990 World Cup in Italy. Two of the team's more experienced players, Rick Davis and Hugo Perez, were unavailable for selection while recovering from injuries. Rather than fill out his team with veteran professionals from U.S. indoor soccer leagues, Gansler and his assistant Stejem Mark chose to select many younger players with better conditioning for the outdoor game, including several collegiate players such as Virginia goalkeeper Tony Meola. The U.S. entered the tournament as major underdogs and lost all three of its group games to Czechoslovakia, Italy, and Austria. Defenders Jimmy Banks and Desmond Armstrong became the first African Americans to appear in a World Cup match for the United States.

During the 1993 U.S. Cup, a tournament designed to prepare for the upcoming World Cup, the U.S. beat England 2–0. After qualifying automatically as the host of the 1994 World Cup under Bora Milutinović, the U.S. opened the tournament schedule with a 1–1 tie against Switzerland in the Pontiac Silverdome in the suburbs of Detroit, the first World Cup game played indoors. In its second game, the U.S. faced Colombia, then ranked fourth in the world, at the Rose Bowl near Los Angeles. Aided by an own goal from Andrés Escobar, the U.S. won 2–1; Escobar was later murdered in his home country, possibly in retaliation for this mistake. Despite a 1–0 loss to Romania in its final group game, the U.S. made it past the initial round for the first time since 1930. In the round of 16, the U.S. lost 1–0 to the eventual champion Brazil. U.S. Soccer later fired Milutinović in 1995 because he was reportedly not interested in administrative duties in addition to coaching.

The U.S. were invited to play in the 1995 Copa América, where they finished first in their group after defeating Chile and Argentina in an upset victory. In the quarterfinals, the U.S. defeated Mexico on penalties, and then lost to Brazil 1–0 in the semifinals. The United States finished fourth after losing to Colombia in the third-place match.

In the 1998 World Cup in France, the team lost all three group matches, 2–0 to Germany, 2–1 to Iran, and 1–0 to the Federal Republic of Yugoslavia, finishing last in the field of 32. The tournament was marred by disputes between the players and head coach Steve Sampson, who resigned shortly after the tournament.

=== 2000s ===
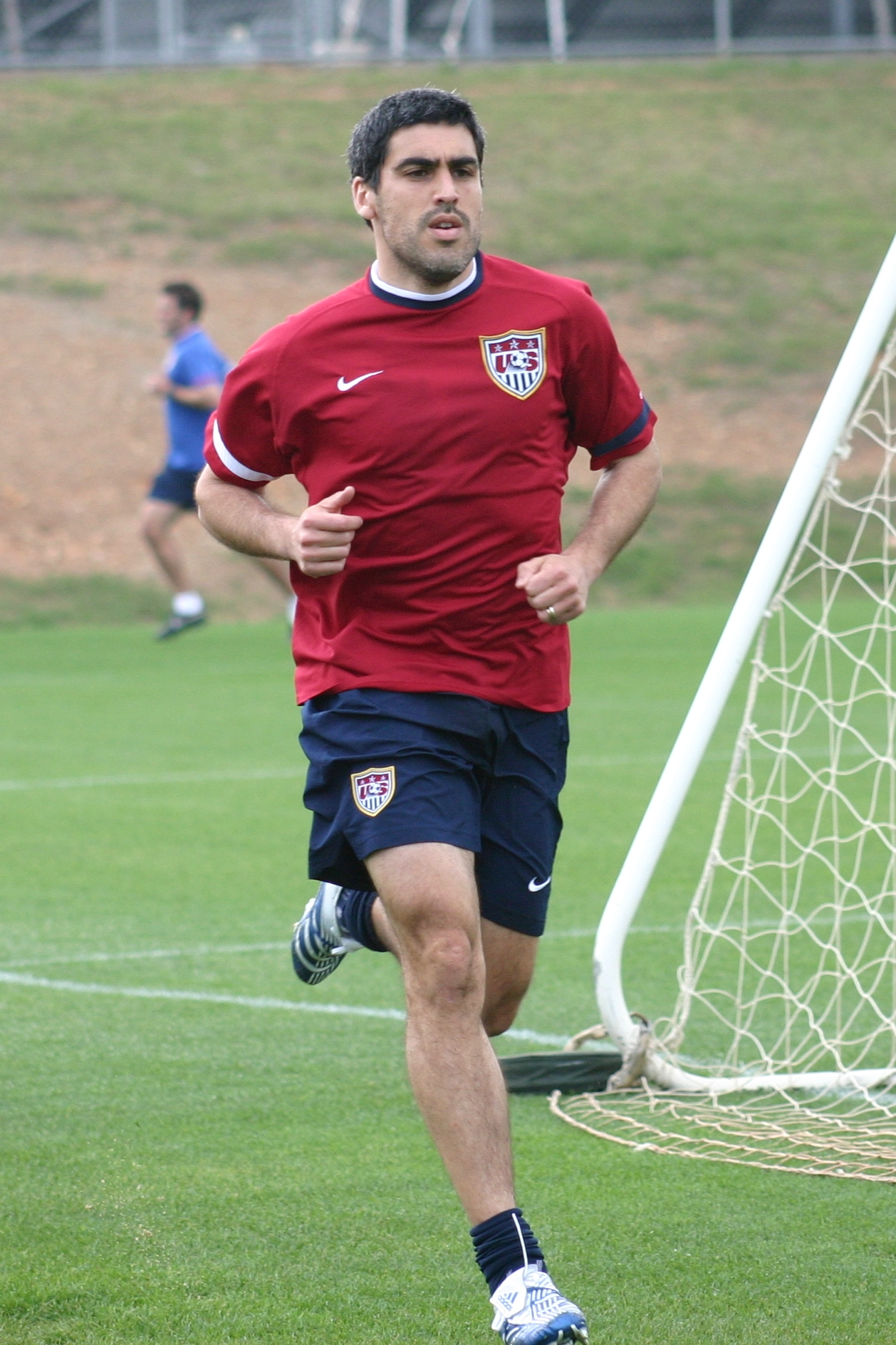
Claudio Reyna during practice

Under former D.C. United head coach Bruce Arena, the U.S. qualified for the 2002 World Cup and reached the quarterfinals, their best finish in a World Cup since 1930. The team earned four points in the group stage, beginning with a 3–2 win over Portugal, followed by a 1–1 tie with co-host and eventual semifinalist South Korea. The third and final match was a 3–1 loss to Poland; the team still advanced to the round of 16 when South Korea defeated Portugal. The U.S. met continental rivals Mexico for the first time in a World Cup, and won the game 2–0, with goals from Brian McBride and Landon Donovan. In the quarterfinals, the USMNT met Germany and lost 1–0 after being controversially denied a penalty when Torsten Frings handled the ball to prevent a Gregg Berhalter goal. Donovan won the Best Young Player for the tournament.

In the 2006 World Cup, after finishing top of the CONCACAF qualification tournament, the U.S. was drawn into Group E along with the Czech Republic, Italy, and Ghana. The United States opened the tournament with a 3–0 loss to the Czech Republic. The team then tied 1–1 against eventual winners Italy, and then were knocked out of the tournament when they were beaten 2–1 by Ghana in its final group match, with Clint Dempsey scoring the U.S.'s only goal in the tournament (the goal against Italy had been an own goal by Italian defender Cristian Zaccardo). Following the tournament, Arena's contract was not renewed; his assistant, former Chicago Fire and MetroStars head coach Bob Bradley, became interim head coach in December 2006 and was selected for the full-time role in May 2007.

After winning the 2007 Gold Cup against Mexico, the USMNT qualified for the 2009 Confederations Cup. The U.S. defeated top-ranked Spain, who were on a 35-game undefeated streak, 2–0. BBC Sport journalist Saj Chowdhury referred to the victory as "one of the biggest upsets in world football." With the win, the United States advanced to its first-ever final in a men's FIFA tournament. The team lost 3–2 to Brazil after leading 2–0 at half-time. Hosting the 2009 Gold Cup, the United States was beaten by Mexico 5–0 in the final; this defeat broke the U.S. team's 58-match home unbeaten streak against CONCACAF opponents, and was the first home loss to Mexico since 1999 and their first home loss in a competitive match since 1998.

In the fourth round of the 2010 World Cup qualification, Jozy Altidore became the youngest U.S. player to score a hat-trick, in a 3–0 victory over Trinidad and Tobago. On October 10, 2009, the U.S. secured qualification to the 2010 World Cup with a 3–2 win over Honduras. Four days later, the U.S. finished in first place in the final round of qualification with a 2–2 tie against Costa Rica.

=== 2010s ===
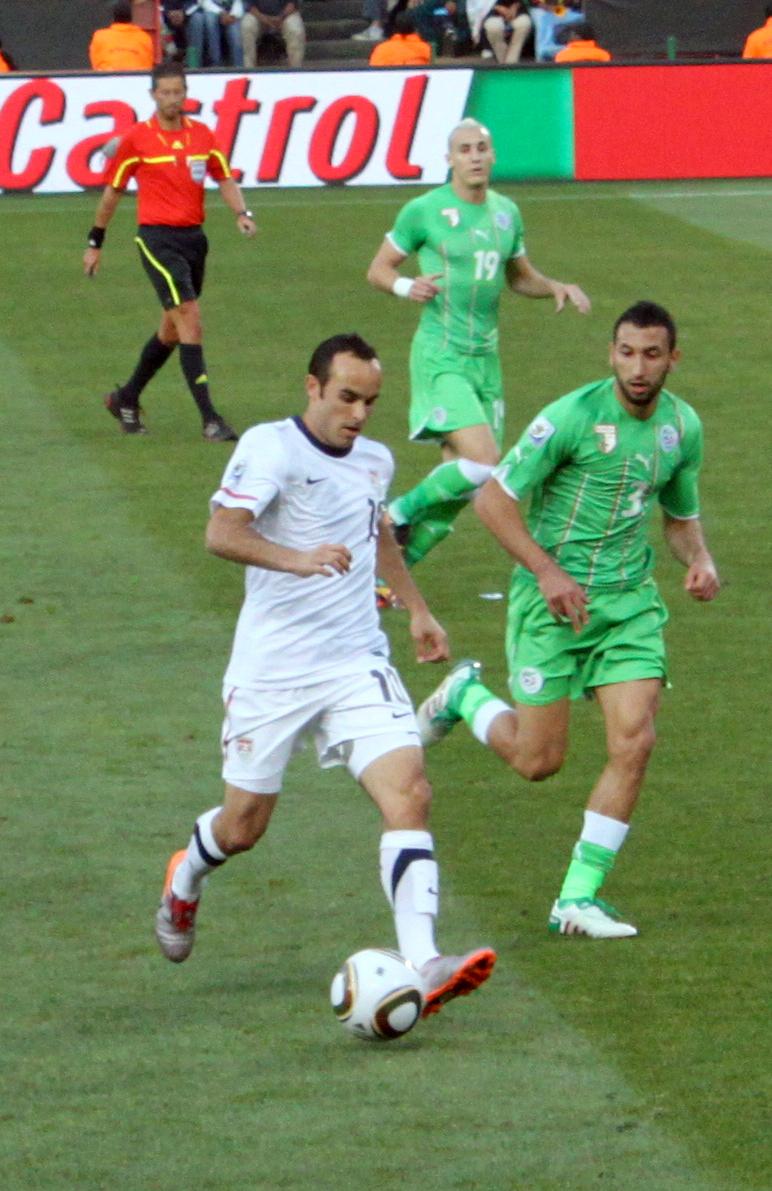
Landon Donovan at the 2010 World Cup

In the 2010 World Cup, the USMNT was drawn into Group C against England, Slovenia and Algeria. After drawing against England 1–1 and Slovenia 2–2, the U.S. defeated Algeria 1–0 with a stoppage-time goal from Landon Donovan, taking first place in a World Cup group for the first time since 1930. In the round of 16, the U.S. was eliminated by Ghana, 2–1.

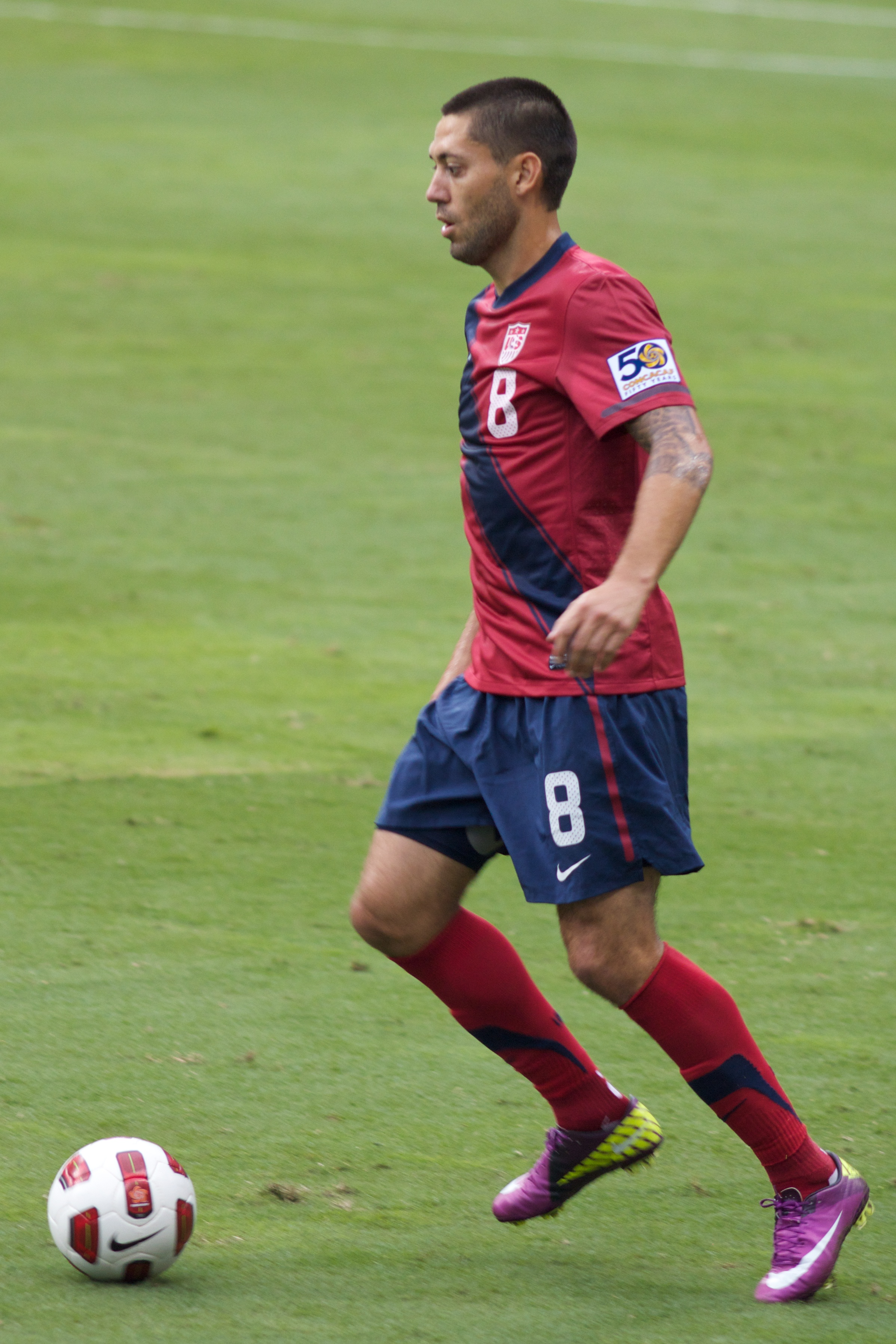
Clint Dempsey with the U.S. in 2011

After losing to Mexico 4–2 in the final of the 2011 Gold Cup, Bob Bradley was relieved of his duties and former Germany manager Jürgen Klinsmann was hired as head coach. The U.S. won 1–0 in Genoa, Italy on February 29, 2012, the team's first-ever win over Italy. In July 2013, the United States became North American champions for the fifth time after winning the Gold Cup with a 1–0 victory over Panama in the final, with Landon Donovan winning the tournament's golden ball award. A 4–3 victory over Bosnia and Herzegovina in an international friendly match in Sarajevo represented the 12th consecutive win for the USMNT, the longest active winning streak for any team in the world at that time. The winning streak ended September 6, when the U.S. lost to Costa Rica 3–1 in San José in the final round of qualification. The U.S. eventually clinched a spot in the 2014 World Cup.

The Americans were drawn into Group G, along with Ghana, Germany, and Portugal. The U.S. won 2–1 in their rematch with Ghana, and then tied their second group game against Portugal 2–2. In the final game of the group stage, the U.S. fell to Germany 1–0, but moved on to the knockout stage on goal difference. This was the first time that the team made two consecutive trips to the knockout stage of the FIFA World Cup. In the round of 16, the U.S. lost 2–1 to Belgium in extra time, despite goalkeeper Tim Howard making a World Cup record 15 saves (Note: FIFA's initial match statistics showed 16 saves, and many news sources continue to use this number. The official FIFA statistics were updated on July 5, 2014, to show 15 saves.) during the match.

In the 2015 Gold Cup, the U.S. were eliminated by Jamaica 2–1 in the semifinals, before losing to Panama on penalties in the third place match. It marked the first time the team failed to make the tournament final since 2003. In the 2015 CONCACAF Cup playoff to determine the region's entry to the 2017 Confederations Cup, the U.S. were defeated 3–2 by Mexico at the Rose Bowl. The results led to criticism of Klinsmann's coaching style, particularly the lack of a cohesive identity.

In June 2016, the U.S. hosted the Copa América Centenario, a special edition of the Copa América to commemorate the centenary of the tournament and its first to be played outside of South America. In their third Copa América appearance, the U.S. topped Group A on goal difference against Colombia despite losing to them, and then beat Ecuador 2–1 in the quarterfinals. The team lost 4–0 to Argentina in the semifinals and 1–0 to Colombia again in the third place match. The U.S. finished fourth overall, tying their best finish ever in 1995.

Following consecutive losses to Mexico and Costa Rica in the opening games of the final round of qualification for the 2018 World Cup, Klinsmann was removed as national team coach and technical director and replaced by previous U.S. head coach Bruce Arena. World Cup qualification resumed on March 24, 2017, where Arena and his team achieved a record 6–0 win over Honduras.

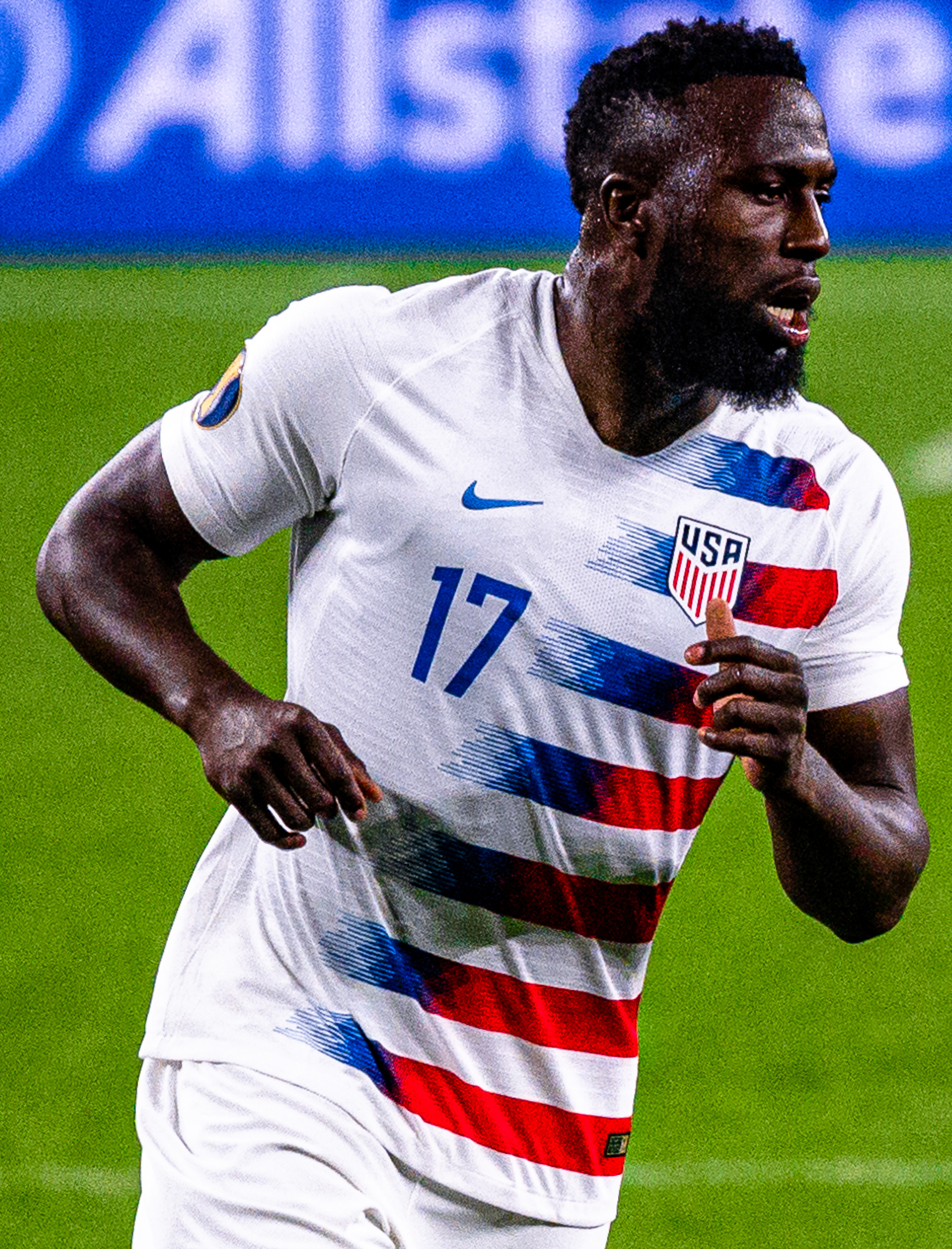
Jozy Altidore in 2019

The U.S. earned their third ever result in World Cup qualification at the Estadio Azteca when they drew 1–1 against Mexico. In July 2017, the U.S. won their sixth Gold Cup with a 2–1 win over Jamaica in the final. Following a 2–1 defeat to Trinidad and Tobago on October 10, 2017, the U.S. failed to qualify for the 2018 World Cup, missing the tournament for the first time since 1986. Many pundits and analysts called this the worst result and worst performance in the history of the national team.

Following Arena's resignation on October 13, 2017, assistant coach Dave Sarachan was named interim head coach during the search for a permanent replacement. The search for a permanent head coach was delayed by the USSF presidential election in February 2018 and the hiring of Earnie Stewart as general manager in June 2018. Gregg Berhalter, coach of the Columbus Crew and a former USMNT defender, was announced as the team's new head coach on December 2, 2018.

Under Berhalter the team lost in the 2019 Gold Cup final 1–0 against Mexico and were unable to defend their title.

=== 2020s ===
An influx of new young talent playing for top European clubs, widely described as America's golden generation, entered the national team in the late 2010s and early 2020s, including Christian Pulisic, Weston McKennie, Tyler Adams, Timothy Weah, Sergiño Dest, and Gio Reyna. This new group won the inaugural CONCACAF Nations League in 2021 with a 3–2 victory against Mexico in the final. A different roster won the Gold Cup against Mexico later that summer, contributing to a record for wins in a calendar year, with 17 wins, three ties, and two losses in 2021.

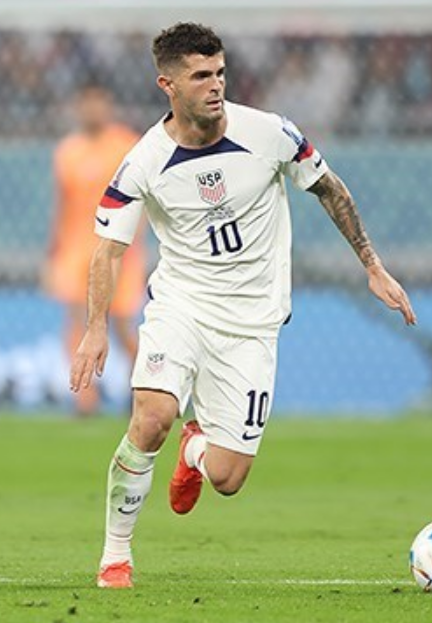
Christian Pulisic at the 2022 World Cup

The United States qualified for the 2022 World Cup by finishing third in the final qualifying round. Grouped with England, Iran, and Wales in Group B, the team advanced to the knockout stage after beating Iran 1–0 in their critical final group stage matchup with a Christian Pulisic goal, finishing the group as runners-up with five points and without losing a game. At the knockouts, they faced the Netherlands and were defeated 3–1 in the Round of 16. Midfielder Kellyn Acosta became the first Asian American player to appear for the U.S. at a World Cup.

After Berhalter's contract expired in December 2022, the U.S. searched for a new head coach. Under interim manager B.J. Callaghan in June 2023, the United States successfully defended their Nations League trophy by winning the 2022–23 CONCACAF Nations League. The team conceded no goals in the finals tournament, winning 3–0 against Mexico and 2–0 against Canada in the final match. Callaghan remained the team's manager for the 2023 Gold Cup the following month, which was played with a different roster. The U.S. were eliminated in the semifinals by Panama after losing a penalty shootout.

The United States automatically qualified for the 2026 World Cup as co-host in February 2023, and secured a spot at the U.S.-hosted 2024 Copa América by defeating Trinidad and Tobago 4–2 over two legs in November 2023. Gregg Berhalter was reappointed as coach of the United States on June 16, 2023. In March 2024, the United States won their third CONCACAF Nations League title by defeating Mexico 2–0 in the final. At the Copa América, the United States were eliminated in the group stage, with a 1–0 loss in the final group stage match against Uruguay involving several controversial decisions against the Americans from referee Kevin Ortega, including a potentially offside Uruguay goal and handling of yellow cards. Following the team's elimination, Berhalter was fired as head coach on July 10, 2024.

On September 10, 2024, Todd Boehly and the USMNT's delegates agreed to an undisclosed exit fee for former Chelsea manager Mauricio Pochettino, and Pochettino would subsequently be announced as the new head coach of the United States, replacing Berhalter. In March 2025 the U.S. lost to Panama 0–1 in stoppage time, marking the first time they've been eliminated from a CONCACAF Nations League title. At the 2025 CONCACAF Gold Cup, a newer inexperienced squad was called up rather than its regular starters due to club commitments or fatigue. The squad ultimately made it to the final, controversially losing to Mexico 2–1 despite handball shouts.

The U.S. was the primary host of the 2026 FIFA World Cup with Mexico and Canada. In the opening group stage match against Paraguay, in Inglewood, California, the U.S. achieved its biggest national team win in World Cup history with a 4–1 scoreline, as Folarin Balogun scored a brace to become the first American in 96 years to have a multi-goal World Cup game since 1930, and Christian Pulisic became the all-time U.S. World Cup assist leader with 3. They won their second game against Australia 2–0, in Seattle, also marking the first time the U.S. had won multiple group stage games since the 1930 World Cup. The U.S. clinched first place in Group D after just two matches, becoming the tournament's second nation to advance to the knockout stage. With their final group stage opponent Turkey already eliminated, the Americans rotated 10 bench players for the final group match, narrowly losing 2–3 back in Inglewood, due to a late Turkish goal scored in stoppage time. In the round of 32, the U.S., down a man from a controversial red card to Balogun, beat Bosnia and Herzegovina 2–0, in Santa Clara, California, breaking their national team's record of most victories at any World Cup with three wins. In the round of 16, the U.S. team was eliminated by Belgium after a 4–1 defeat, once again in Seattle, repeating the eventual tournament elimination result from 2014.

In August 2026, head coach Mauricio Pochettino signed a new contract, extending through 2030. In September, Mathis Albert at 17 years and 131 days old became the youngest goalscorer in national team history, before Cavan Sullivan beat his record only four days later at 17 years and two days old. On November 13, it was announced that Pochettino would depart his role as United States head coach to join English Premier League side Manchester United on November 18 after the club activated his buyout clause.

== Team image ==
=== Uniform ===
Since their first unofficial game against Canada, the most common U.S. uniform has been white tops with blue shorts. A variant with a diagonal stripe or "sash" across the shirt similar to Peru's jersey was first adopted in 1950 and used in various uniforms in the 2000s. A color scheme based on the U.S. flag—usually a shirt with red and white stripes with blue shorts—has been occasionally used (most prominently in the 1994 World Cup and 2012–13 qualifiers as well the 1983 Team America franchise of the North American Soccer League).

German brand Adidas provided the uniform for the United States from 1984 to 1994. Since 1995, American company Nike has been the uniform supplier. The final Adidas jersey was a denim-inspired blue shirt with white stars paired with red shorts.

==== Uniform suppliers ====
Supplier	Period	Contract duration	Notes
Adidas	1975–1994	1975–1994	
Nike	1995–present	1995–2021	
Nike	1995–present	2022–2031	

=== Crest ===
The first logo used by the team and the federation, from 1913 to 1924.

Logo used from 1924 to 1929.

Logo used from 1930 to 1934.

Logo used from 1934 to 1936.

Logo used by the team at the 1950 FIFA World Cup.

A variant of the 1950 logo.

Another variant of the 1950 logo.

Logo used in 1959.

Logo used from 1967 and 1971, and readopted in 1972, being used until 1974.

A variant of the logo also used between 1967 and 1972, and 1972 and 1974.

Logo used from 1971 to 1972.

Logo used in 1976.

Logo used from 1981 to 1983.

Logo used from 1983 to 1984.

Crest used by the team from 1984 to 1986.

Alternate version of the logo also used from 1984 to 1986.

Crest used by the team from 1986 to 1992.

Logo used in 2013 to mark US Soccer's centennial.

== Rivalries ==
=== Mexico ===
The United States and Mexico have been the most successful teams in CONCACAF and are major rivals.

The two countries first met in 1934 during a World Cup qualifier in Rome that the U.S. won; Mexico won the following 24 meetings and were perennial qualifiers for the World Cup. Since 1980, the U.S. has had more wins against Mexico, particularly in home matches and major tournaments. They faced off in the round of 16 of the 2002 World Cup, with the United States winning 2–0. On August 15, 2012, the U.S. defeated Mexico at Estadio Azteca in the first victory for the Americans on Mexican soil in 75 years. On October 10, 2015, Mexico defeated the U.S. 3–2 in the CONCACAF Cup in Pasadena, California to qualify for the 2017 Confederations Cup. Thirteen months later, on November 11, 2016, El Tri defeated the U.S. in Columbus, Ohio for their second consecutive victory on American soil, in qualification for the 2018 World Cup. In 2021, the United States defeated Mexico three times in a calendar year for the first time, winning the CONCACAF Nations League final, the Gold Cup final, and in 2022 World Cup qualifying.

Ever since their first meeting in 1934, the two teams have met 80 times, with Mexico leading 38W–17T–25L, outscoring the U.S. 149–96. However, because of recent growth of soccer in the U.S., since the beginning of the 21st century, the U.S. leads the series 20W–8T–11L. Either the United States or Mexico has won every edition of the Gold Cup except one (the 2000 Gold Cup was won by Canada).

=== Canada ===
The U.S. has a secondary rivalry with Canada, with the rivalry stemming from a generally friendly rivalry between the two countries. The United States has historically been the stronger side, having qualified for 11 World Cups while Canada has qualified for three.

On October 15, 2019, Canada defeated the United States for the first time in 34 years, at BMO Field in Toronto. In 2022 World Cup qualifying, Canada tied 1–1 with the U.S. in Nashville, Tennessee, and defeated the USMNT 2–0 in Hamilton, Ontario. On June 18, 2023, the United States defeated Canada 2–0 in the CONCACAF Nations League final in Las Vegas. The U.S. defeated Canada yet again in a 2023 Gold Cup quarterfinal matchup, this time 3–2 on penalties, in Cincinnati, Ohio.

On September 7, 2024, the United States lost 2–1 to Canada in an international friendly in Kansas City, marking Canada’s first win over the United States on American soil in 67 years. On March 23, 2025, the United States again lost 2–1 to Canada in the 2024–25 CONCACAF Nations League third-place match, giving Canada consecutive wins over the United States for the first time since 1985. In stoppage time, a scuffle involving players from both teams broke out after Gio Reyna brought down Jacob Shaffelburg near the touchline.

The United States currently leads the series at 17W–11T–14L.

=== Costa Rica ===
In the 2010s, the United States began to develop a rivalry with Costa Rica. The impetus for the rivalry was a 2014 World Cup qualifying match played on March 22, 2013, at Dick's Sporting Goods Park in Commerce City, Colorado under blizzard conditions. Costa Rica filed a protest with FIFA due to field conditions after the United States won the game 1–0, but were denied recourse. The game was dubbed "Snow Clasico" because of weather conditions. The United States have never won an away match in Costa Rica, losing 10 meetings and drawing twice.

== Supporters ==
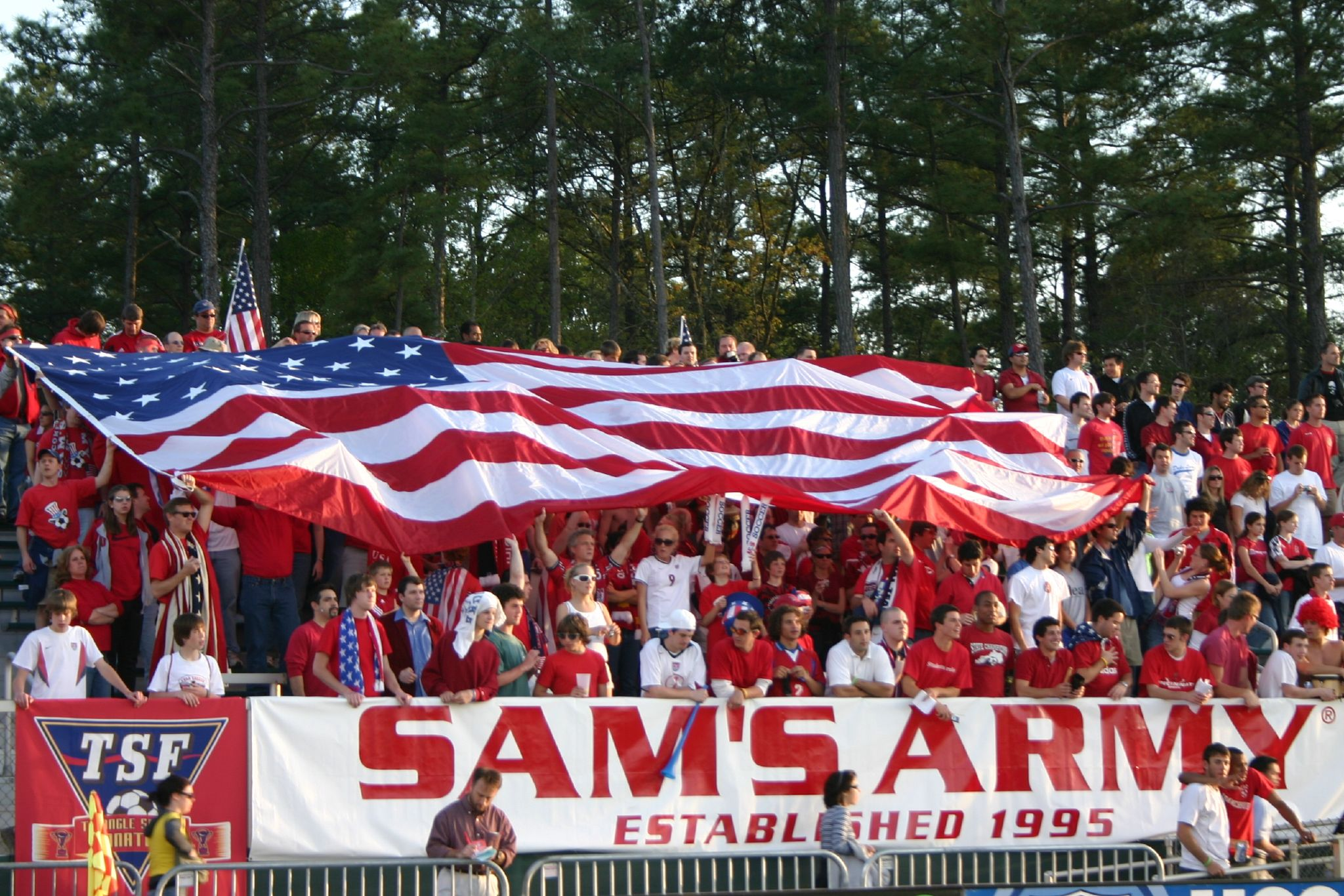
Sam's Army at a U.S. vs Jamaica match

There have been two main supporter groups backing U.S. Soccer teams, Sam's Army and The American Outlaws. Sam's Army started shortly after the 1994 World Cup and were active through 2014. Sam's Army members wore red to matches and sung or chanted throughout the match, and often brought huge U.S. flags and other banners to the game.

The American Outlaws began in Lincoln, Nebraska, in 2007 as a local supporters' group. The group's membership attempted to address a lack of consistency from game to game in supporter organization and social events on match days.

The U.S. men's national team has a major following on social media platforms. Interest in young American players and the attention they bring has led to an increase in foreign investment in U.S. players, soccer development programs, and sports clubs.

== Home stadium ==
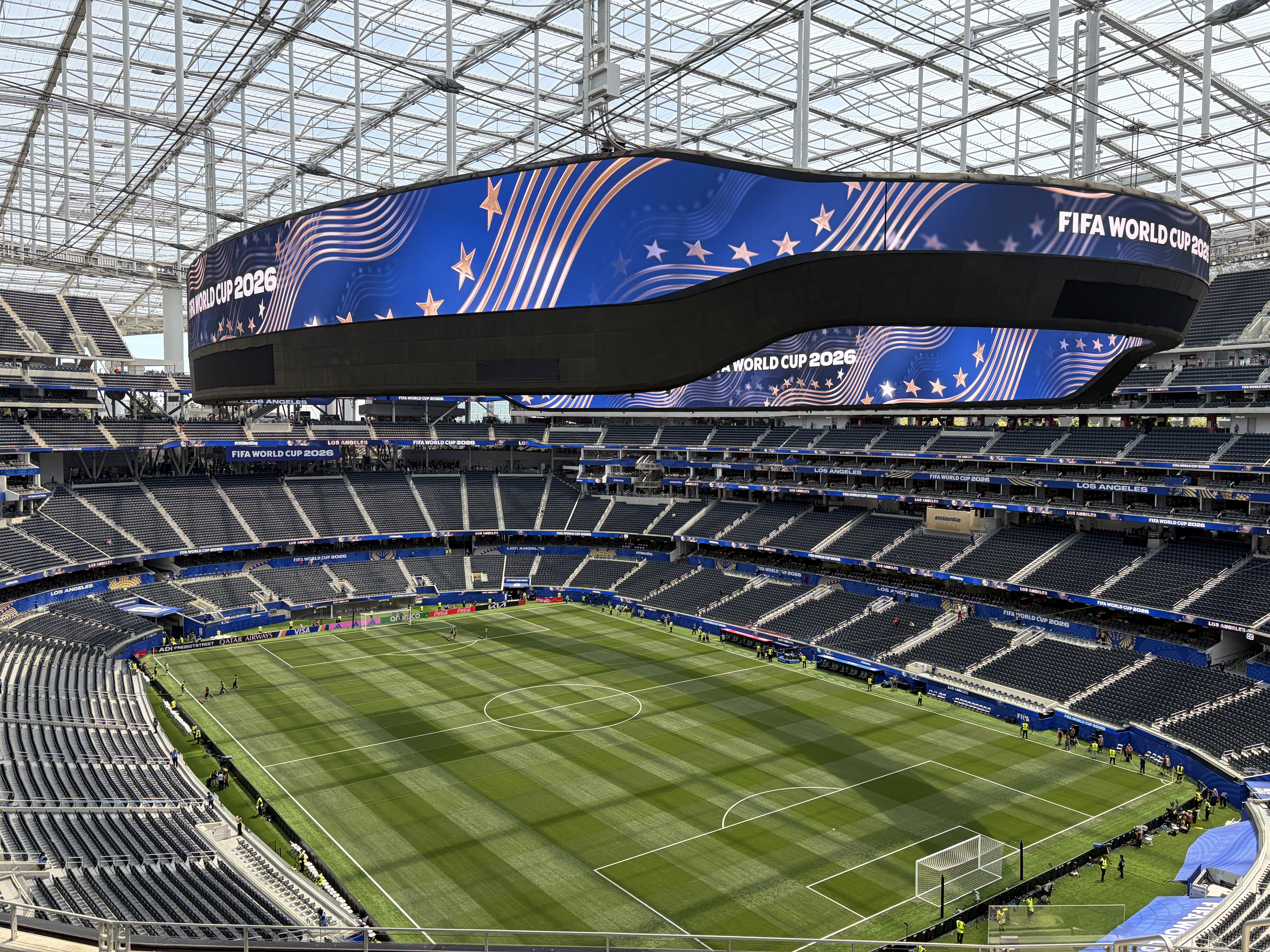
The United States opening its first match at the SoFi Stadium in Los Angeles during the 2026 FIFA World Cup

The United States does not have a dedicated national stadium like some other national teams; instead, the team has played its home games at various venues across the country. As of 2026, the team has played in 130 stadiums in 30 states and the District of Columbia. Robert F. Kennedy Memorial Stadium, located in the national capital of Washington, D.C., has hosted 24 matches, the most of any stadium. The state of California has hosted 123 matches, the most of any state, and greater Los Angeles has hosted 83 matches at several venues in and around the city of LA. The Los Angeles Memorial Coliseum hosted 20 matches from 1965 to 2000. The Rose Bowl, a 92,000-seat venue in Pasadena, has hosted 17 national team matches.

The team has played nine World Cup matches on home soil. In the 1994 edition, these included matches at the Pontiac Silverdome (the first indoor venue in the tournament's history), the Rose Bowl, and Stanford Stadium in Stanford, California. The United States stayed on the West Coast for the 2026 edition with two matches at SoFi Stadium in Inglewood, California, two matches at Lumen Field in Seattle, and one match at Levi's Stadium in Santa Clara, California.

=== Media coverage ===
TNT Sports has the main English language rights for U.S. Soccer broadcasts from 2022 to 2030, including all friendlies, CONCACAF Nations League group play matches and home World Cup qualifiers. All matches stream live on Max with matches also on TNT, TBS or TruTV. CBS Sports airs USMNT away World Cup qualifiers and the Nations League finals, semifinals and third place game on CBS Sports Network or the Paramount+ streaming service. Fox Sports holds the rights to USMNT matches in the FIFA World Cup and CONCACAF Gold Cup, with matches airing on Fox or Fox Sports 1. Telemundo has the Spanish language rights to all U.S. Soccer broadcasts from 2023 to 2030. These agreements do not apply to World Cup away qualifiers, whose rights are distributed by the host country.

== Results and fixtures ==
The following is a list of match results in the last 12 months, as well as any future matches that have been scheduled.

Win Draw Loss Fixture

=== 2026 ===
March 28 Friendly	United States	2–5	Belgium	Atlanta, Georgia
15:30 ET	McKennie 39'; Agyemang 87'	Report	Debast 45'; Onana 53'; De Ketelaere 59' (pen.); Lukébakio 68', 82'	Stadium: Mercedes-Benz Stadium; Attendance: 66,867; Referee: Esteban Ostojich (Uruguay)

March 31 Friendly	United States	0–2	Portugal	Atlanta, Georgia
19:00 EST		Report	Trincão 37'; Félix 59'	Stadium: Mercedes-Benz Stadium; Attendance: 72,297; Referee: Sven Jablonski (Germany)

May 31 Friendly	United States	3–2	Senegal	Charlotte, North Carolina
15:30 EDT	Dest 7'; Pulisic 20'; Balogun 63'	Report	Mané 44', 52'	Stadium: Bank of America Stadium; Attendance: 57,741; Referee: Nick Walsh (Scotland)

June 6 Friendly	United States	1–2	Germany	Chicago, Illinois
14:30 ET	Robinson 37'	Report	Havertz 2'; Sané 57'	Stadium: Soldier Field; Attendance: 63,636; Referee: Piero Maza (Chile)

June 12 2026 FIFA World Cup Group D	United States	4–1	Paraguay	Inglewood, California
18:00 PT	Bobadilla 7' (o.g.); Balogun 31', 45+5'; Reyna 90+8'	Report	Maurício 73'	Stadium: SoFi Stadium; Attendance: 70,492; Referee: Danny Makkelie (Netherlands)

June 19 2026 FIFA World Cup Group D	United States	2–0	Australia	Seattle, Washington
15:00 ET	Burgess 11' (o.g.); Freeman 43'	Report		Stadium: Lumen Field; Attendance: 66,925; Referee: Felix Zwayer (Germany)

June 25 2026 FIFA World Cup Group D	Turkey	3–2	United States	Inglewood, California
22:00 ET	Güler 10'; Yılmaz 31'; Ayhan 90+8'	Report	Trusty 3'; Berhalter 49'	Stadium: SoFi Stadium; Attendance: 70,492; Referee: Mustapha Ghorbal (Algeria)

July 1 2026 FIFA World Cup Round of 32	United States	2–0	Bosnia and Herzegovina	Santa Clara, California
20:00 ET	Balogun 45'; Tillman 82'	Report		Stadium: Levi's Stadium; Attendance: 68,827; Referee: Raphael Claus (Brazil)

July 6 2026 FIFA World Cup Round of 16	United States	1–4	Belgium	Seattle, Washington
20:00 ET	Tillman 31'	Report	De Ketelare 9', 33'; Vanaken 57'; Lukaku 90+3'	Stadium: Lumen Field; Attendance: 66,925; Referee: Adham Makhadmeh (Jordan)

September 26 Friendly	United States	4–1	Peru	Orlando, Florida
16:30 EDT	Ellis 4'; Tillman 66' (pen.); Hall 72'; Berhalter 90'	Report	Lapadula 15'	Stadium: Inter.co Stadium; Attendance: 24,228; Referee: Steffon Dewar (Jamaica)

September 29 Friendly	United States	4–2	Chile	St. Louis, Missouri
19:00 CDT	Berhalter 37'; Hall 51'; Richards 72'; Albert 90+3'	Report	Ulloa 45+1'; Gutiérrez 49'	Stadium: Energizer Park; Attendance: 21,680; Referee: Jorge Camacho (Mexico)

October 3 Friendly	United States	3–0	Mexico	Glendale, Arizona
19:00 MST	Hall 28'; Sullivan 62'; Tillman 84'	Report		Stadium: State Farm Stadium; Attendance: 64,932; Referee: Selvin Brown (Honduras)

October 6 Friendly	United States	1–0	Canada	St. Paul, Minnesota
19:00 CDT	Ellis 29'	Report		Stadium: Allianz Field; Attendance: 19,182; Referee: Steven Madrigal (Costa Rica)

November 14 Nations League QF 1st Leg	Haiti	0–6	United States	Miami, Florida
16:30 EST		Report	Trusty 10'; Hall 52'; Pulisic 62' (pen.), 63'; McKennie 68'; Balogun 82'	Stadium: Nu Stadium; Attendance: 21,597; Referee: Walter López (Guatemala)

November 17 Nations League QF 2nd Leg	United States	2–0	Haiti	Cincinnati, Ohio
19:00 EST	Pulisic 25'; Hall 43'	Report		Stadium: TQL Stadium; Attendance: 24,001; Referee: Oshane Nation (Jamaica)

December 13 Friendly	United States	v	Jamaica	Fort Lauderdale, Florida
15:30 ET				Stadium: Inter Miami CF Stadium

=== 2027 ===
March 25 Nations League Finals SF	United States	v	Mexico	Inglewood, California
				Stadium: SoFi Stadium

March 28 Nations League Finals F/3PG	Canada or Panama	v	United States	Inglewood, California
				Stadium: SoFi Stadium

=== All-time results ===
The following table shows the United States all-time international record, correct as of November 17, 2026.

Against	Played	Won	Drawn	Lost	GF	GA	GD
Total	819	366	168	284	1258	1057	+201

== Staff ==
Coaching staff

Position	Name
Head coach	Vacant
Assistant coaches	Vacant
Goalkeeping coach	(England) Jack Robinson
Athletic coach	Vacant
Chief analyst	(Canada) Sam Gregory
Match analyst	(Netherlands) David Handgraaf
Performance manager	(Netherlands) Rick Cost

Technical staff

Position	Name	Start date	Ref.
Sporting director	Vacant	TBD	
Vice president of sporting	(United States) Oguchi Onyewu	May 2023	

== Players ==
=== Current squad ===
The following 24 players were called up for 2026–27 CONCACAF Nations League quarter-finals matches against Haiti on November 14 and 17, 2026.
Caps and goals are updated as of November 17, 2026 after the match against Haiti.

No.	Pos.	Player	Date of birth (age)	Caps	Goals	Club
1	GK	Matt Freese	September 2, 1998 (age 28)	20	0	(United States Soccer Federation) New York City FC
18	GK	Diego Kochen	March 19, 2006 (age 20)	4	0	(Danish Football Association) Lyngby
23	GK	Brian Schwake	August 24, 2001 (age 25)	2	0	(United States Soccer Federation) Nashville SC
2	DF	Reed Baker-Whiting	March 31, 2005 (age 21)	1	0	(United States Soccer Federation) Nashville SC
3	DF	Chris Richards	March 28, 2000 (age 26)	45	4	(The Football Association) Crystal Palace
5	DF	Antonee Robinson	August 8, 1997 (age 29)	64	5	(The Football Association) Fulham
6	DF	Auston Trusty	August 12, 1998 (age 28)	16	2	(Scottish Football Association) Celtic
12	DF	Neil Pierre	October 19, 2007 (age 19)	4	0	(United States Soccer Federation) Philadelphia Union
15	DF	Bryan Reynolds	June 28, 2001 (age 25)	8	1	(French Football Federation) Rennes
16	DF	Alex Freeman	August 9, 2004 (age 22)	28	3	(Royal Spanish Football Federation) Villarreal
22	DF	Mark McKenzie	February 25, 1999 (age 27)	30	0	(French Football Federation) Toulouse
4	MF	Tyler Adams (captain)	February 14, 1999 (age 27)	64	2	(The Football Association) Bournemouth
7	MF	Jack McGlynn	July 7, 2003 (age 23)	13	2	(The Football Association) Stoke City
8	MF	Weston McKennie	August 28, 1998 (age 28)	73	13	(Italian Football Federation) Juventus
13	MF	Adri Mehmeti	April 6, 2009 (age 17)	4	0	(United States Soccer Federation) New York Red Bulls
14	MF	Sebastian Berhalter	May 10, 2001 (age 25)	24	4	(The Football Association) Middlesbrough
17	MF	Malik Tillman	May 28, 2002 (age 24)	41	7	(German Football Association) Bayer Leverkusen
21	MF	Mathis Albert	May 21, 2009 (age 17)	5	1	(German Football Association) Borussia Dortmund
23	MF	Santiago Castañeda	November 13, 2004 (age 22)	1	0	(German Football Association) SC Paderborn
9	FW	Julian Hall	March 24, 2008 (age 18)	6	5	(United States Soccer Federation) New York Red Bulls
10	FW	Christian Pulisic	September 18, 1998 (age 28)	92	36	(Italian Football Federation) AC Milan
11	FW	Cavan Sullivan	September 28, 2009 (age 17)	4	1	(United States Soccer Federation) Philadelphia Union
20	FW	Folarin Balogun	July 3, 2001 (age 25)	33	13	(French Football Federation) Monaco (Note: Monaco is a Monégasque club playing in the French football league system.)
	FW	Justin Ellis	May 14, 2007 (age 19)	4	2	(United States Soccer Federation) Orlando City

=== Recent call-ups ===
The following players have also been called up for the team within the last twelve months.

Pos.	Player	Date of birth (age)	Caps	Goals	Club	Latest call-up
GK	Chris Brady	March 3, 2004 (age 22)	2	0	(United States) Chicago Fire	v. Canada; October 6, 2026
GK	Matt Turner	June 24, 1994 (age 32)	55	0	(United States) New England Revolution	2026 FIFA World Cup
GK	Patrick Schulte	March 13, 2001 (age 25)	3	0	(United States) Columbus Crew	v. Portugal; March 31, 2026
GK	Roman Celentano	September 14, 2000 (age 26)	0	0	(United States) FC Cincinnati	v. Belgium; March 28, 2026^{WD}
DF	Sergiño Dest	November 3, 2000 (age 26)	46	3	(Netherlands) PSV Eindhoven	v. Haiti; November 14, 2026^{INJ}
DF	George Campbell	June 22, 2001 (age 25)	3	0	(England) West Bromwich Albion	v. Haiti; November 14, 2026^{INJ}
DF	Miles Robinson	March 14, 1997 (age 29)	42	3	(United States) FC Cincinnati	v. Canada; October 6, 2026
DF	Peyton Miller	November 8, 2007 (age 19)	2	0	(United States) New England Revolution	v. Canada; October 6, 2026
DF	Frankie Westfield	December 9, 2005 (age 20)	2	0	(United States) Philadelphia Union	v. Canada; October 6, 2026
DF	Tim Ream	October 5, 1987 (age 39)	86	1	(United States) Charlotte FC	2026 FIFA World Cup^{RET}
DF	Joe Scally	December 31, 2002 (age 23)	28	0	(Germany) Borussia Mönchengladbach	2026 FIFA World Cup
DF	Max Arfsten	April 19, 2001 (age 25)	21	1	(England) Middlesbrough	2026 FIFA World Cup
MF	Gio Reyna	November 13, 2002 (age 24)	47	10	(France) Strasbourg	v. Haiti; November 14, 2026^{INJ}
MF	Yunus Musah	November 29, 2002 (age 23)	50	1	(Italy) AC Milan	v. Canada; October 6, 2026
MF	Brooklyn Raines	March 11, 2005 (age 21)	4	0	(United States) New England Revolution	v. Canada; October 6, 2026
MF	Zavier Gozo	March 22, 2007 (age 19)	1	0	(England) Crystal Palace	v. Canada; October 6, 2026
MF	Cristian Roldan	June 3, 1995 (age 31)	47	0	(United States) Seattle Sounders	2026 FIFA World Cup
MF	Tanner Tessmann	September 24, 2001 (age 25)	14	1	(France) Lyon	v. Portugal; March 31, 2026
MF	Aidan Morris	November 16, 2001 (age 25)	14	0	(England) Middlesbrough	v. Portugal; March 31, 2026
MF	Johnny Cardoso	September 20, 2001 (age 25)	23	0	(Spain) Atlético Madrid	v. Belgium; March 28, 2026^{INJ}
FW	Damion Downs	July 6, 2004 (age 22)	7	0	(United States) St. Louis City SC	v. Canada; October 6, 2026
FW	Cole Campbell	February 20, 2006 (age 20)	1	0	(Germany) SV Elversberg	v. Canada; October 6, 2026
FW	Ricardo Pepi	January 9, 2003 (age 23)	42	13	(Netherlands) PSV Eindhoven	v. Peru; September 26, 2026^{INJ}
FW	Brenden Aaronson	October 22, 2000 (age 26)	59	9	(England) Leeds United	2026 FIFA World Cup
FW	Timothy Weah	February 22, 2000 (age 26)	53	7	(France) Marseille	2026 FIFA World Cup
FW	Haji Wright	March 27, 1998 (age 28)	22	7	(England) Coventry City	2026 FIFA World Cup
FW	Alejandro Zendejas	February 7, 1998 (age 28)	15	2	(Mexico) América	2026 FIFA World Cup
FW	Patrick Agyemang	November 7, 2000 (age 26)	14	6	(England) Derby County	v. Portugal; March 31, 2026
Notes: ^{INJ} = Injured; ^{WD} = Player withdrew from the squad due to non-injury issue; ^{RET} = Retired from the national team

== Individual records ==
As of November 17, 2026.
Players in bold are still active with the national team.

=== Most appearances ===
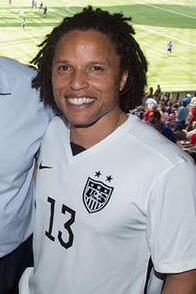
Cobi Jones is the United States' most capped player with 164 appearances.

Rank	Player	Caps	Goals	Career
1	Cobi Jones	164	15	1992–2004
2	Landon Donovan	157	57	2000–2014
3	Michael Bradley	151	17	2006–2019
4	Clint Dempsey	141	57	2004–2017
5	Jeff Agoos	134	4	1988–2003
6	Marcelo Balboa	127	13	1988–2000
7	DaMarcus Beasley	126	17	2001–2017
8	Tim Howard	121	0	2002–2017
9	Jozy Altidore	115	42	2007–2019
10	Claudio Reyna	112	8	1994–2006

=== Top goalscorers ===
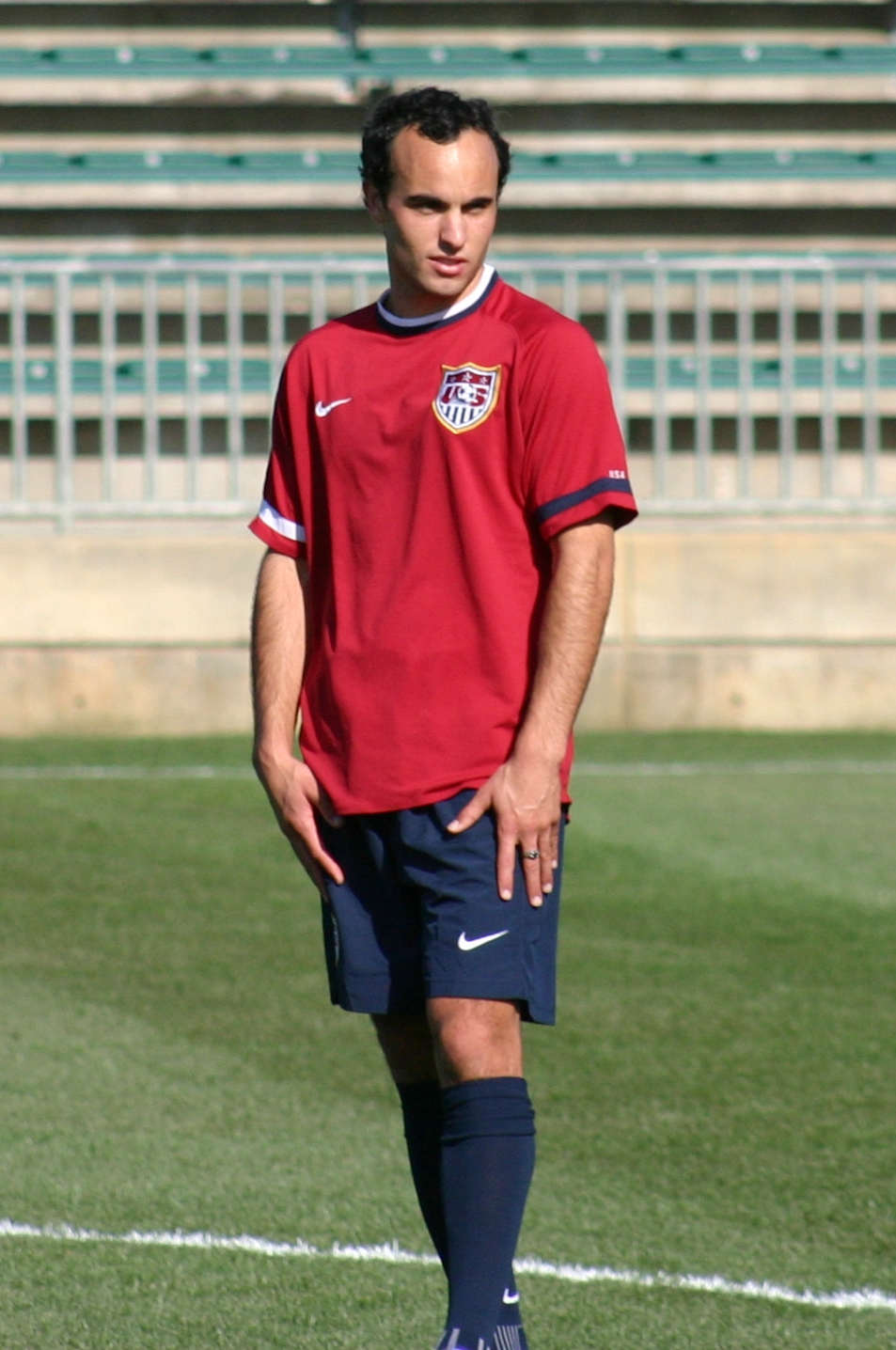
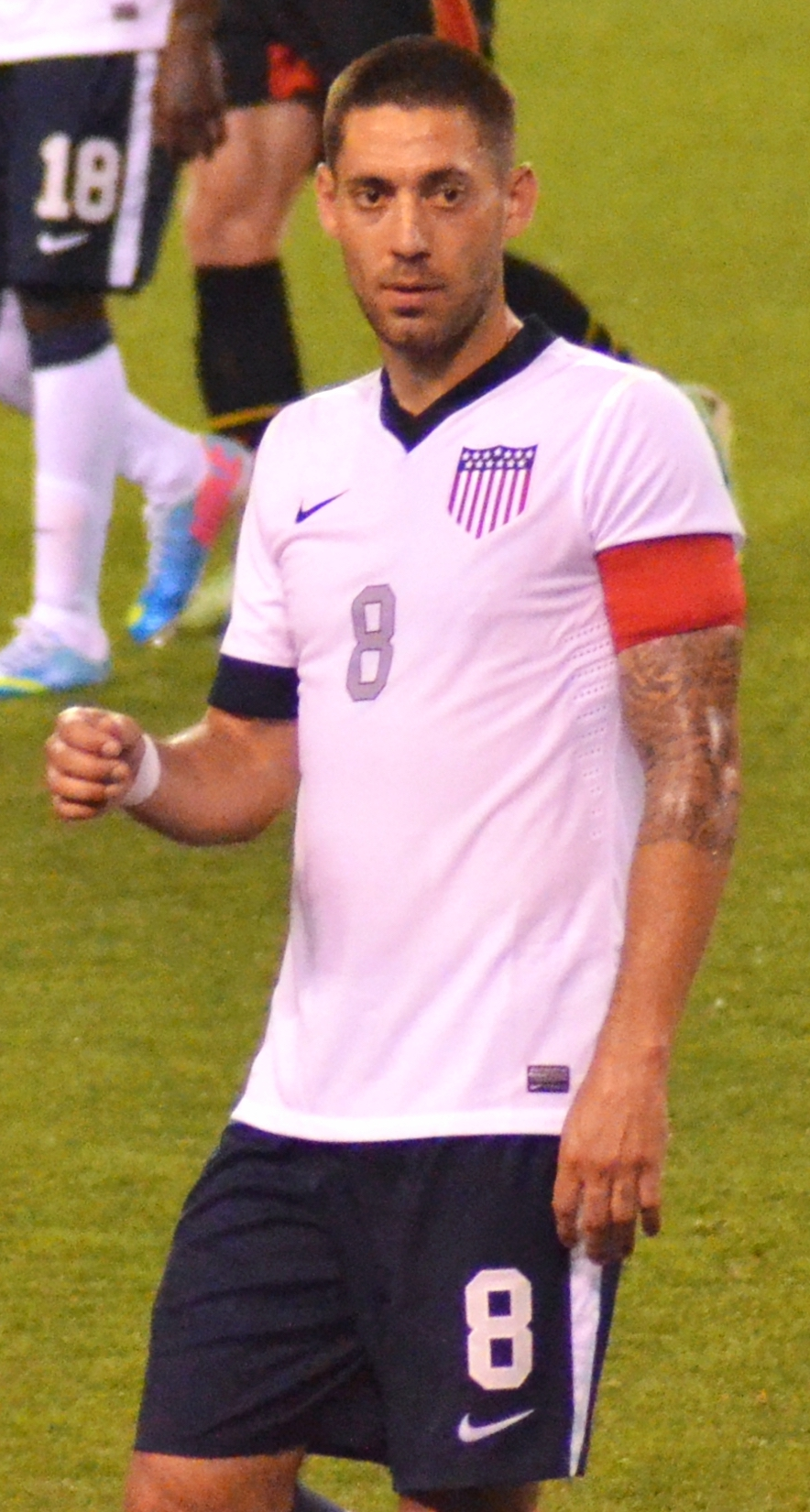
Landon Donovan and Clint Dempsey are the United States' joint all-time top scorers with 57 goals.

Rank	Player	Goals	Caps	Ratio	Career
1	Clint Dempsey	57	141	0.4	2004–2017
1	Landon Donovan	57	157	0.36	2000–2014
3	Jozy Altidore	42	115	0.37	2007–2019
4	**Christian Pulisic**	36	92	0.39	2016–present
5	Eric Wynalda	34	106	0.32	1990–2000
6	Brian McBride	30	95	0.32	1993–2006
7	Joe-Max Moore	24	100	0.24	1992–2002
8	Bruce Murray	21	85	0.25	1985–1993
9	Eddie Johnson	19	63	0.3	2004–2014
10	Earnie Stewart	17	101	0.17	1990–2004
10	DaMarcus Beasley	17	126	0.13	2001–2017
10	Michael Bradley	17	151	0.11	2006–2019

== Competitive record ==
The United States has competed at the FIFA World Cup, the CONCACAF Gold Cup, the CONCACAF Nations League, and the Summer Olympics. The team has also played in the now-defunct FIFA Confederations Cup, the Copa América, as well as several minor tournaments.

The best result for the United States in a World Cup tournament came in 1930 when it reached the semifinals. The team included six naturalized internationals, five of them from Scotland and one from England. In the modern era, the team's best result came in 2002, when it reached the quarterfinals. Its worst World Cup tournament results in were group-stage eliminations in 1990, 1998, and 2006; the team failed to qualify altogether for the final tournament in 2018. The United States reached the round of 16 in 1994, 2010, 2014, 2022, and 2026.

In the Confederations Cup, the United States finished in third place in both 1992 and 1999, and were runner-up in 2009. The team appeared in its first intercontinental tournament final at the 2009 Confederations Cup, where it lost to Brazil 3–2 after leading 2–0 at halftime.

The U.S. men's soccer team first played in the Summer Olympics in 1924. From that tournament to 1980, only amateur and state-sponsored Eastern European players were allowed on Olympic teams. The Olympics became a full international tournament in 1984 after the IOC allowed full national teams from outside FIFA's strongest confederations of UEFA and CONMEBOL. Since 1992 the men's Olympic event has been age-restricted, to those 23 years and younger, with the exception (since 1996) of up to three overage players; participation has been by the United States men's national under-23 soccer team.

In regional competitions, the United States has won the CONCACAF Gold Cup seven times, with its most recent title in 2021. The team has won three of the four CONCACAF Nations League editions that have been played so far, including the inaugural 2021 final. Its best finish at the Copa América was fourth place at the 1995 and 2016 editions, while it competed as the host nation in 2024, failing to advance past the group stage.

=== FIFA World Cup ===
FIFA World Cup record										Qualification record					
Year	Result	Position	Pld	W	D	L	GF	GA	Squad	Pld	W	D	L	GF	GA
(Uruguay) 1930	Third place (Note: The United States earned 3rd place over the loser of the other semifinal, Yugoslavia, because of a better goal differential (+1 to Yugoslavia's 0). No third place match was played. "1930 FIFA World Cup Uruguay 1930". FIFA.com.)	3rd	3	2	0	1	7	6	Squad	Qualified as invitees					
(Italy) 1934	Round of 16	16th	1	0	0	1	1	7	Squad	1	1	0	0	4	2
(France) 1938	Withdrew									Withdrew					
(Brazil) 1950	Group stage	10th	3	1	0	2	4	8	Squad	4	1	1	2	8	15
(Switzerland) 1954	Did not qualify									4	2	0	2	7	9
(Sweden) 1958	Did not qualify									4	0	0	4	5	21
(Chile) 1962	Did not qualify									2	0	1	1	3	6
(England) 1966	Did not qualify									4	1	2	1	4	5
(Mexico) 1970	Did not qualify									6	3	0	3	11	9
(West Germany) 1974	Did not qualify									4	0	1	3	6	10
(Argentina) 1978	Did not qualify									5	1	2	2	3	7
(Spain) 1982	Did not qualify									4	1	1	2	4	8
(Mexico) 1986	Did not qualify									6	3	2	1	8	3
(Italy) 1990	Group stage	23rd	3	0	0	3	2	8	Squad	10	5	4	1	11	4
(United States) 1994	Round of 16	14th	4	1	1	2	3	4	Squad	Qualified as hosts					
(France) 1998	Group stage	32nd	3	0	0	3	1	5	Squad	16	8	6	2	27	14
(South Korea) (Japan) 2002	Quarter-finals	8th	5	2	1	2	7	7	Squad	16	8	4	4	25	11
(Germany) 2006	Group stage	25th	3	0	1	2	2	6	Squad	18	12	4	2	35	11
(South Africa) 2010	Round of 16	12th	4	1	2	1	5	5	Squad	18	13	2	3	42	16
(Brazil) 2014	Round of 16	15th	4	1	1	2	5	6	Squad	16	11	2	3	26	14
(Russia) 2018	Did not qualify									16	7	4	5	37	16
(Qatar) 2022	Round of 16	14th	4	1	2	1	3	4	Squad	14	7	4	3	21	10
(Canada) (Mexico) (United States) 2026	Round of 16	12th	5	3	0	2	11	8	Squad	Qualified as co-hosts					
(Morocco) (Portugal) (Spain) 2030	To be determined									To be determined					
(Saudi Arabia) 2034	To be determined									To be determined					
Total	Third place	12/23	42	12	8	22	51	74	—	168	84	40	44	287	191

Notes

FIFA World Cup history
First match	United States 3–0 Belgium (July 13, 1930; Montevideo, Uruguay)
Biggest win	United States 3–0 Belgium (July 13, 1930; Montevideo, Uruguay); United States 3–0 Paraguay (July 17, 1930; Montevideo, Uruguay); United States 4–1 Paraguay (June 12, 2026; Inglewood, United States)
Biggest defeat	Italy 7–1 United States (May 27, 1934; Rome, Italy)
Best result	Third place (1930)
Worst result	32nd – Group stage (1998)

=== Olympic Games ===
Olympic Games record										Qualification record					
Year	Result	Position	Pld	W	D	L	GF	GA	Squad	Pld	W	D	L	GF	GA
(France) 1900	Did not enter														
(United States) 1904	Silver	2nd	3	1	1	1	2	7	Squad						
(United States) 1904	Bronze	3rd	3	0	1	2	0	6	Squad						
(United Kingdom) 1908	Did not enter														
(Sweden) 1912	Did not enter														
(Belgium) 1920	Did not enter														
(France) 1924	Round of 16	12th	2	1	0	1	1	3	Squad						
(Netherlands) 1928	Round of 16	9th	1	0	0	1	2	11	Squad						
(Germany) 1936	Round of 16	9th	1	0	0	1	0	1	Squad						
(United Kingdom) 1948	Round of 16	11th	1	0	0	1	0	9	Squad						
(Finland) 1952	Round of 32	17th	1	0	0	1	0	8	Squad						
(Australia) 1956	Quarterfinals	5th	1	0	0	1	1	9	Squad	Walkover					
(Italy) 1960	Did not qualify									2	0	1	1	1	3
(Japan) 1964	Did not qualify									3	1	0	2	7	7
(Mexico) 1968	Did not qualify									Did not qualify					
(West Germany) 1972	Group stage	14th	3	0	1	2	0	10	Squad	6	2	3	1	10	9
(Canada) 1976	Did not qualify									Did not qualify					
(Soviet Union) 1980	Qualified, later withdrew									4	2	1	1	6	8
(United States) 1984	Group stage	9th	3	1	1	1	4	2	Squad	Qualified as hosts					
(South Korea) 1988	Group stage	12th	3	0	2	1	3	5	Squad	4	4	0	0	13	4
Since 1992	The under-23 team participated									1992 Pre-Olympic Tournament					
Total	Silver medal	10/19	22	3	6	13	13	71	—	19	9	5	5	37	31

Olympic Games history
First match	(Canada) Galt F.C. 7–0 Christian Brothers College (November 16, 1904; St. Louis, United States)
Biggest win	United States 3–0 Costa Rica (July 29, 1984; Stanford, United States)
Biggest defeat	Argentina 11–2 United States (May 27, 1928; Amsterdam, Netherlands); Italy 9–0 United States (August 2, 1948; London, United Kingdom)
Best result	Silver medal (1904)
Worst result	17th – Round of 32 (1952)

=== CONCACAF Gold Cup ===
CONCACAF Championship / Gold Cup record										Qualification record					
Year	Result	Position	Pld	W	D	L	GF	GA	Squad	Pld	W	D	L	GF	GA
(El Salvador) 1963	Did not enter									Did not enter					
(Guatemala) 1965	Did not enter									Did not enter					
(Honduras) 1967	Did not enter									Did not enter					
(Costa Rica) 1969	Did not qualify									2	0	0	2	0	3
(Trinidad and Tobago) 1971	Did not enter									Did not enter					
(Haiti) 1973	Did not qualify									4	0	1	3	6	10
(Mexico) 1977	Did not qualify									4	1	2	1	3	4
(Honduras) 1981	Did not qualify									4	1	1	2	4	8
1985	Group stage	6th	4	2	1	1	4	3	Squad	2	1	1	0	4	0
1989	Runners-up	2nd	8	4	3	1	6	3	Squad	2	1	1	0	5	1
(United States) 1991	Champions	1st	5	4	1	0	10	3	Squad	Qualified automatically					
(Mexico) (United States) 1993	Runners-up	2nd	5	4	0	1	5	5	Squad	Qualified automatically					
(United States) 1996	Third place	3rd	4	3	0	1	8	3	Squad	Qualified automatically					
(United States) 1998	Runners-up	2nd	4	3	0	1	6	2	Squad	Qualified automatically					
(United States) 2000	Quarterfinals	5th	3	2	1	0	6	2	Squad	Qualified automatically					
(United States) 2002	Champions	1st	5	4	1	0	9	1	Squad	Qualified automatically					
(Mexico) (United States) 2003	Third place	3rd	5	4	0	1	13	4	Squad	Qualified automatically					
(United States) 2005	Champions	1st	6	4	2	0	11	3	Squad	Qualified automatically					
(United States) 2007	Champions	1st	6	6	0	0	13	3	Squad	Qualified automatically					
(United States) 2009	Runners-up	2nd	6	4	1	1	12	8	Squad	Qualified automatically					
(United States) 2011	Runners-up	2nd	6	4	0	2	9	6	Squad	Qualified automatically					
(United States) 2013	Champions	1st	6	6	0	0	20	4	Squad	Qualified automatically					
(Canada) (United States) 2015	Fourth place	4th	6	3	2	1	12	5	Squad	Qualified automatically					
(United States) 2017	Champions	1st	6	5	1	0	13	4	Squad	Qualified automatically					
(Costa Rica) (Jamaica) (United States) 2019	Runners-up	2nd	6	5	0	1	15	2	Squad	CONCACAF fourth round					
(United States) 2021	Champions	1st	6	6	0	0	11	1	Squad	2019–20 CONCACAF Nations League					
(Canada) (United States) 2023	Semifinals	4th	5	2	3	0	16	4	Squad	2022–23 CONCACAF Nations League					
(Canada) (United States) 2025	Runners-up	2nd	6	4	1	1	13	6	Squad	2024–25 CONCACAF Nations League					
2027	Qualified								Squad	2026–27 CONCACAF Nations League					
Total	7 Titles	20/29	108	79	17	12	212	72	—	18	4	6	8	22	26

CONCACAF Championship / Gold Cup history
First match	Trinidad and Tobago 1–2 United States (May 15, 1985; St. Louis, United States)
Biggest win	United States 6–0 Cuba (July 18, 2015; Baltimore, United States); United States 6–0 Trinidad and Tobago (June 22, 2019; Cleveland, United States); United States 6–0 Saint Kitts and Nevis (June 28, 2023; St. Louis, United States); United States 6–0 Trinidad and Tobago (July 2, 2023; Charlotte, United States)
Biggest defeat	United States 0–5 Mexico (July 26, 2009; East Rutherford, United States)
Best result	Champions (1991, 2002, 2005, 2007, 2013, 2017, 2021)
Worst result	Group stage (1985)

=== CONCACAF Nations League ===
CONCACAF Nations League record
League phase											Final phase								
Season	Division	Group	Seed	Pld	W	D	L	GF	GA	P/R	Finals	Result	Pld	W	D	L	GF	GA	Squad
2019–20	A	A	3rd	4	3	0	1	15	3	Same position	(United States) 2021	Champions	2	2	0	0	4	2	Squad
2022–23	A	D	1st	4	3	1	0	14	2	Same position	(United States) 2023	Champions	2	2	0	0	5	0	Squad
2023–24	Bye		2nd	N/A						Same position	(United States) 2024	Champions	4	3	0	1	9	3	Squad
2024–25	Bye		3rd	N/A						Same position	(United States) 2025	Fourth place	4	2	0	2	6	5	Squad
2026–27	Bye		2nd	N/A						Same position	(United States) 2027	TBD	2	2	0	0	8	0	Squad
Total				8	6	1	1	29	5	—	Total	3 Titles	14	11	0	3	32	10	—

CONCACAF Nations League history
First match	United States 7–0 Cuba (October 11, 2019; Washington, D.C., United States)
Biggest win	United States 7–0 Cuba (October 11, 2019; Washington, D.C., United States)
Biggest defeat	Canada 2–0 United States (October 15, 2019; Toronto, Canada)
Best result	Champions (2019–20, 2022–23, 2023–24)
Worst result	Fourth place (2024–25)

=== Copa América ===
Copa América record
Year	Result	Position	Pld	W	D	L	GF	GA	Squad
(Ecuador) 1993	Group stage	12th	3	0	1	2	3	6	Squad
(Uruguay) 1995	Fourth place	4th	6	2	1	3	6	7	Squad
(Venezuela) 2007	Group stage	12th	3	0	0	3	2	8	Squad
(United States) 2016	Fourth place	4th	6	3	0	3	7	8	Squad
(United States) 2024	Group stage	11th	3	1	0	2	3	3	Squad
Total	Fourth place	Invitation (5)	21	6	2	13	21	32	—

Copa América history
First match	Uruguay 1–0 United States (June 16, 1993; Ambato, Ecuador)
Biggest win	United States 4–0 Costa Rica (June 7, 2016; Chicago, Illinois, United States)
Biggest defeat	Argentina 4–0 United States (June 21, 2016; Houston, Texas, United States)
Best result	Fourth place (1995 and 2016)
Worst result	Group stage (1993, 2007 and 2024)

=== FIFA Confederations Cup ===
FIFA Confederations Cup record
Year	Result	Position	Pld	W	D	L	GF	GA
(Saudi Arabia) 1992	Third place	3rd	2	1	0	1	5	5
(Saudi Arabia) 1995	Did not qualify							
(Saudi Arabia) 1997	Did not qualify							
(Mexico) 1999	Third place	3rd	5	3	0	2	6	3
(South Korea) (Japan) 2001	Did not qualify							
(France) 2003	Group stage	7th	3	0	1	2	1	3
(Germany) 2005	Did not qualify							
(South Africa) 2009	Runners-up	2nd	5	2	0	3	8	9
(Brazil) 2013	Did not qualify							
(Russia) 2017	Did not qualify							
Total	Runners-up	4/10	15	6	1	8	20	20

FIFA Confederations Cup history
First match	Saudi Arabia 3–0 United States (October 15, 1992; Riyadh, Saudi Arabia)
Biggest win	United States 5–2 Ivory Coast (October 19, 1992; Riyadh, Saudi Arabia)
Biggest defeat	Saudi Arabia 3–0 United States (October 15, 1992; Riyadh, Saudi Arabia) United States 0–3 Brazil (June 18, 2009; Pretoria, South Africa)
Best result	Runners-up (2009)
Worst result	Group stage (2003)

=== NAFC Championship ===
NAFC Championship record
Year	Round	Position	Pld	W	D	L	GF	GA	Squad
(Cuba) 1947	Third place	3rd	2	0	0	2	2	10	Squad
(Mexico) 1949	Runners-up	2nd	4	1	1	2	8	15	Squad
Total	Runners-up	2/2	6	1	1	4	10	25	—

== Honors ==
=== Global ===
- FIFA World Cup
  - (bronze) Third place (1): 1930
- Olympic Games
  - (silver) Silver medal (1): 1904 (Note: Demonstrations matches played by club teams, not recognized by FIFA.)
  - (bronze) Bronze medal (1): 1904

=== Intercontinental ===
- FIFA Confederations Cup
  - (silver) Runners-up (1): 2009
  - (bronze) Third place (2): 1992, 1999

=== Continental ===
- CONCACAF Championship / Gold Cup
  - Champions (7): 1991, 2002, 2005, 2007, 2013, 2017, 2021
  - (silver) Runners-up (7): 1989, 1993, 1998, 2009, 2011, 2019, 2025
  - (bronze) Third place (2): 1996, 2003
- CONCACAF Nations League
  - Champions (3): 2019–20, 2022–23, 2023–24
- CONCACAF Cup
  - (silver) Runners-up (1): 2015

=== Subcontinental ===
- NAFC Championship (Note: Official competition organized by NAFC, the former subcontinental confederation affiliated with FIFA as the governing body of soccer in the North American Zone (1946–1961), and a direct predecessor of CONCACAF.)
  - (silver) Runners-up (1): 1949
  - (bronze) Third place (1): 1947
- North American Nations Cup
  - (silver) Runners-up (1): 1991
  - (bronze) Third place (1): 1990

=== Friendly ===
- U.S. Cup (3): 1992, 1995, 2000
- Marlboro Cup (2): 1989–II, 1989–III

=== Summary ===
Including honors in competitions directly organized/recognized by FIFA or an affiliated confederation.

Competition	1st place, gold medalist(s)	2nd place, silver medalist(s)	3rd place, bronze medalist(s)	Total
FIFA World Cup	0	0	1	1
FIFA Confederations Cup	0	1	2	3
CONCACAF Championship / Gold Cup	7	7	2	16
CONCACAF Nations League	3	0	0	3
CONCACAF Cup	0	1	0	1
NAFC Championship	0	1	1	2
Total	10	10	6	26

== See also ==
- Fútbol de Primera Player of the Year
- List of United States men's international soccer players born outside the United States
- U.S. National Soccer Team Players Association
- U.S. Soccer Player of the Year
- United States men's national under-17 soccer team
- United States men's national under-20 soccer team
- United States men's national under-23 soccer team
- United States women's national soccer team

== Notes ==
Preceded by Inaugural	CONCACAF Nations League Champions; 2019–20 (first title); 2022–23 (second title); 2023–24 (third title)	Succeeded by Mexico
