= The American Outlaws =

U.S. Soccer supporters' group

- Abbreviation: AO
- Established: 2007
- Type: Supporters' group
- Team: United States of America
- Motto: Unite and Strengthen
- President: Brian Hexsel
- Vice President: Justin Brunken
- Key people: Megan Brunken (Secretary & Treasurer)
- Membership: 30,000+
- Colors: Red
- Website: TheAmericanOutlaws.com

The American Outlaws (abbreviation: AO) are an unofficial supporters' group for the United States men's national soccer team and United States women's national soccer team and have been described as "a raucous group of U.S. supporters" by ESPN. Founded in 2007 by a group of fans from Lincoln, Nebraska, the group set out to "unite and strengthen" supporters at United States national soccer team games.

Their first appearance was at an international friendly between Brazil and the United States at Soldier Field in Chicago on September 9, 2007, and they are now found at every men's and women's national team games. The group can be readily identified by their red membership shirts and American flag bandanas. At games, they are most often located as a group in the seats behind one of the goals. They usually bring banners and other TIFO. They are frequently accompanied by a drum corp made up of members dressed like popular American icons such as George Washington, Abraham Lincoln, Captain America, Rocky Balboa, and the Pilgrims.

== Organizational structure ==
=== National organization ===
The national organization is based in Lincoln, Nebraska, and it handles the day-to-day operations of the group. The national organization is in charge of domestic ticket requests and all other matters pertaining to U.S. Soccer for members. It develops national team-related merchandise like membership kits, T-shirts, and scarves. It is responsible for connecting supporters from around the country through travel and accommodations deals and producing various forms of media content such as scouting reports and a podcast.

For the 2010 FIFA World Cup, AO organized a travel package for members planning on going to South Africa. At the following 2014, they organized a travel package for Brazil for over 550 members. In 2015, American Outlaws organized their first trip to the Women's World Cup.

The organization was formed and is run by Korey Donahoo and Justin Brunken and is supported by numerous other individuals.

=== Local chapters ===
The group is organized into local chapters based in metropolitan areas. The local chapters handle building support for the national teams at the local level, and are responsible for organizing members attending official U.S. national team games in their city, including parties pre- and post-game, and chants in the stands.

The requirements for recognition as an official chapter are:

- Organization of a local leadership group;
- Enrolling a minimum of 35 dues-paying members;
- Partnering with a local bar to hosting viewing parties on a regular basis;
- Agreement to abide by the National Code of Conduct and By-Laws.

Newly recognized chapters develop a crest that connects American soccer with local landmarks and/or individuals. They receive a banner from AO upon their recognition. There are currently 203 official chapters and over 30,000 members.

==== American Outlaws chapters ====
There are over 200 American Outlaws chapters, present in all states, Washington, D. C., and Puerto Rico, in addition to multiple international chapters.

== Controversy ==
Like many supporter groups around the world, The American Outlaws have been involved in a number of controversies of various degrees. One was related to whether the organization should be non-profit, and whether travel costs should be paid for staff who work at game fixtures. Another involved accusations that the group had a "frat boy" culture that alienated some male and many female members as the organization expanded. In response, The American Outlaws created "AO Watch", a group that addresses fan reports of misbehavior by American Outlaw supporters during games. The group has also actively undertaken to address racism, sexism, and homophobia before they happen, including working to ban the "puto" chant now banned by FIFA worldwide.

== Gallery ==
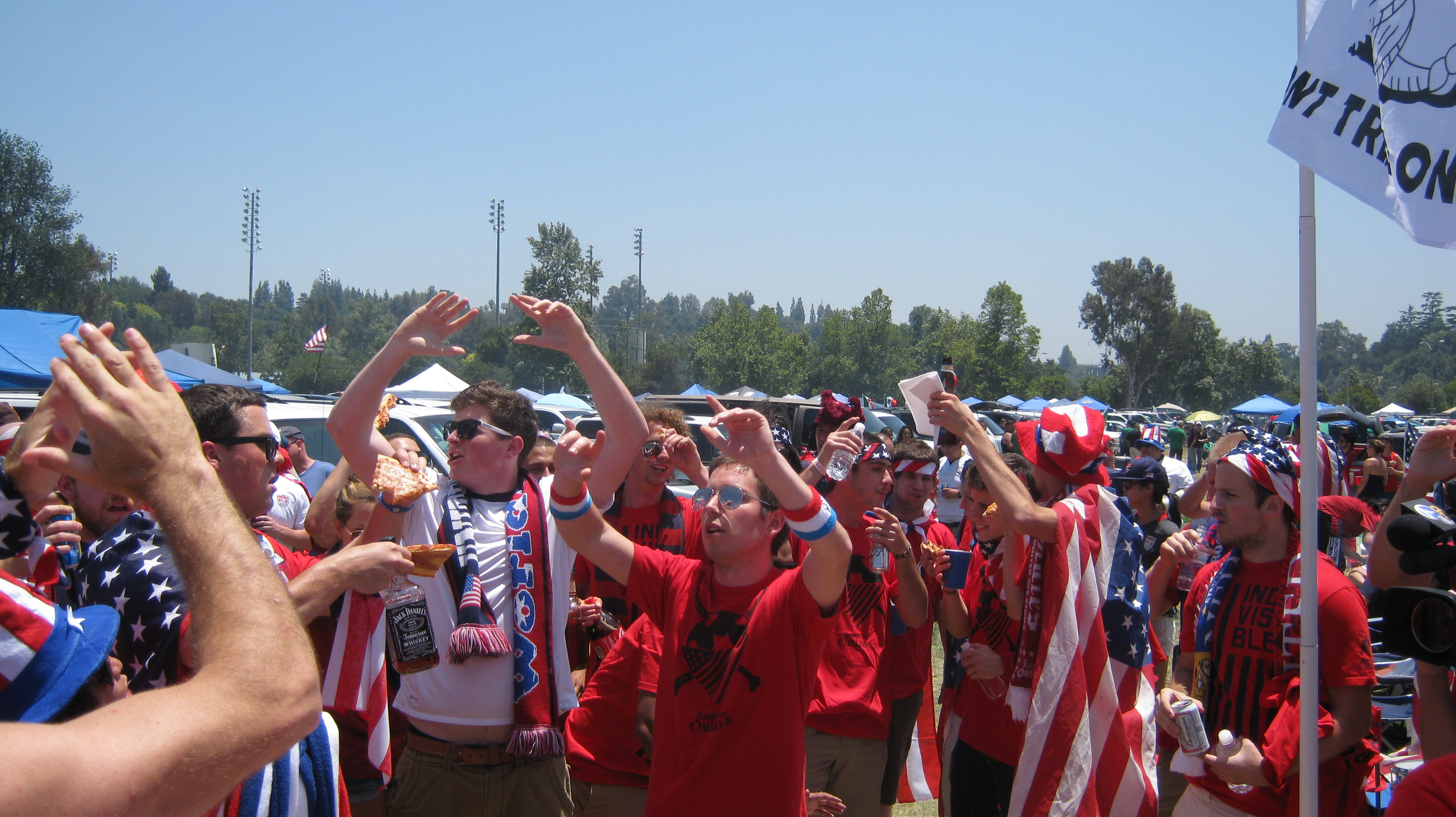
The American Outlaws tailgate outside the Rose Bowl before the 2011 CONCACAF Gold Cup final

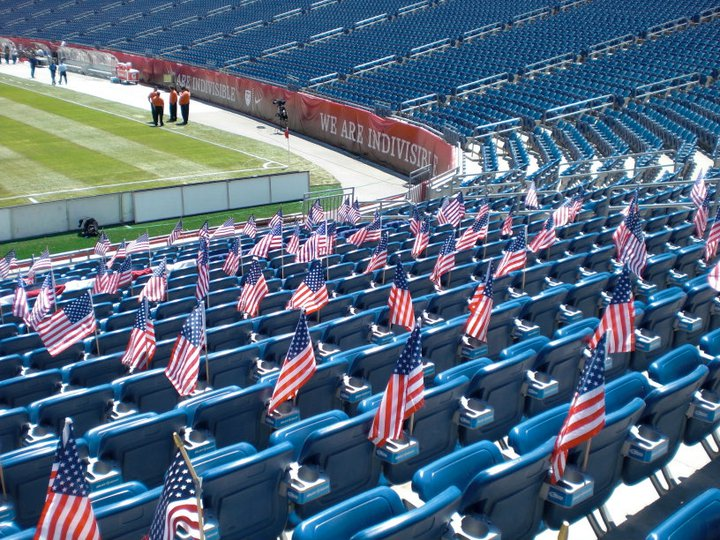
Tifo display organized by the American Outlaws before an international friendly between the United States and Spain at Gillette Stadium

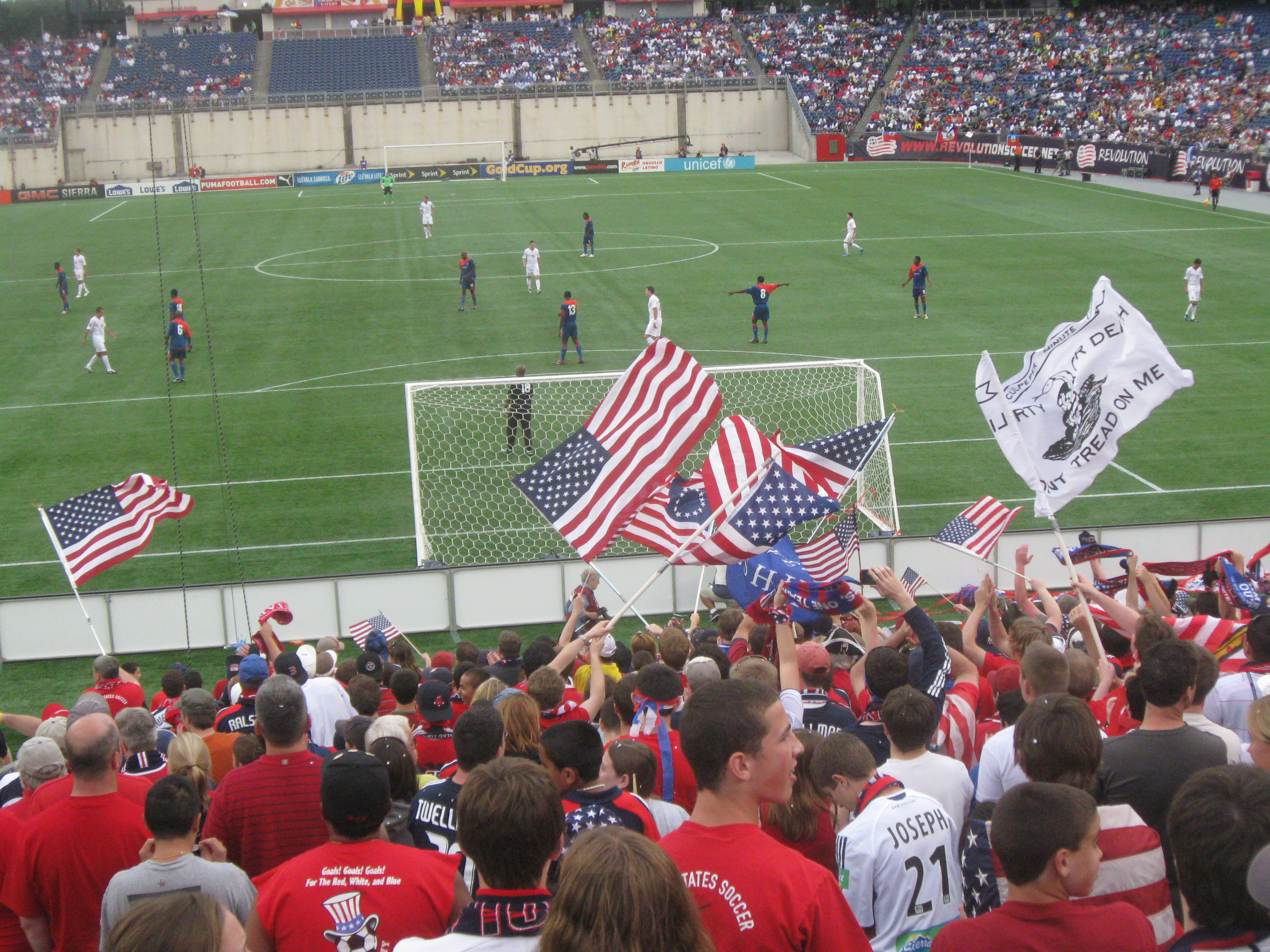
The American Outlaws during the 2009 CONCACAF Gold Cup match between the United States and Haiti at Gillette Stadium

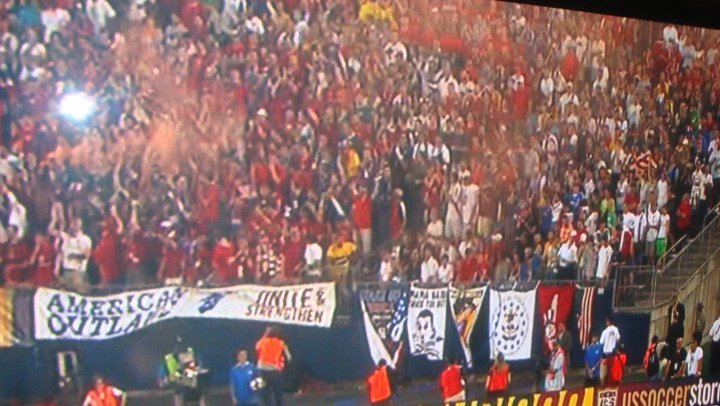
The American Outlaws section before an international friendly between the United States and the Czech Republic at Rentschler Field

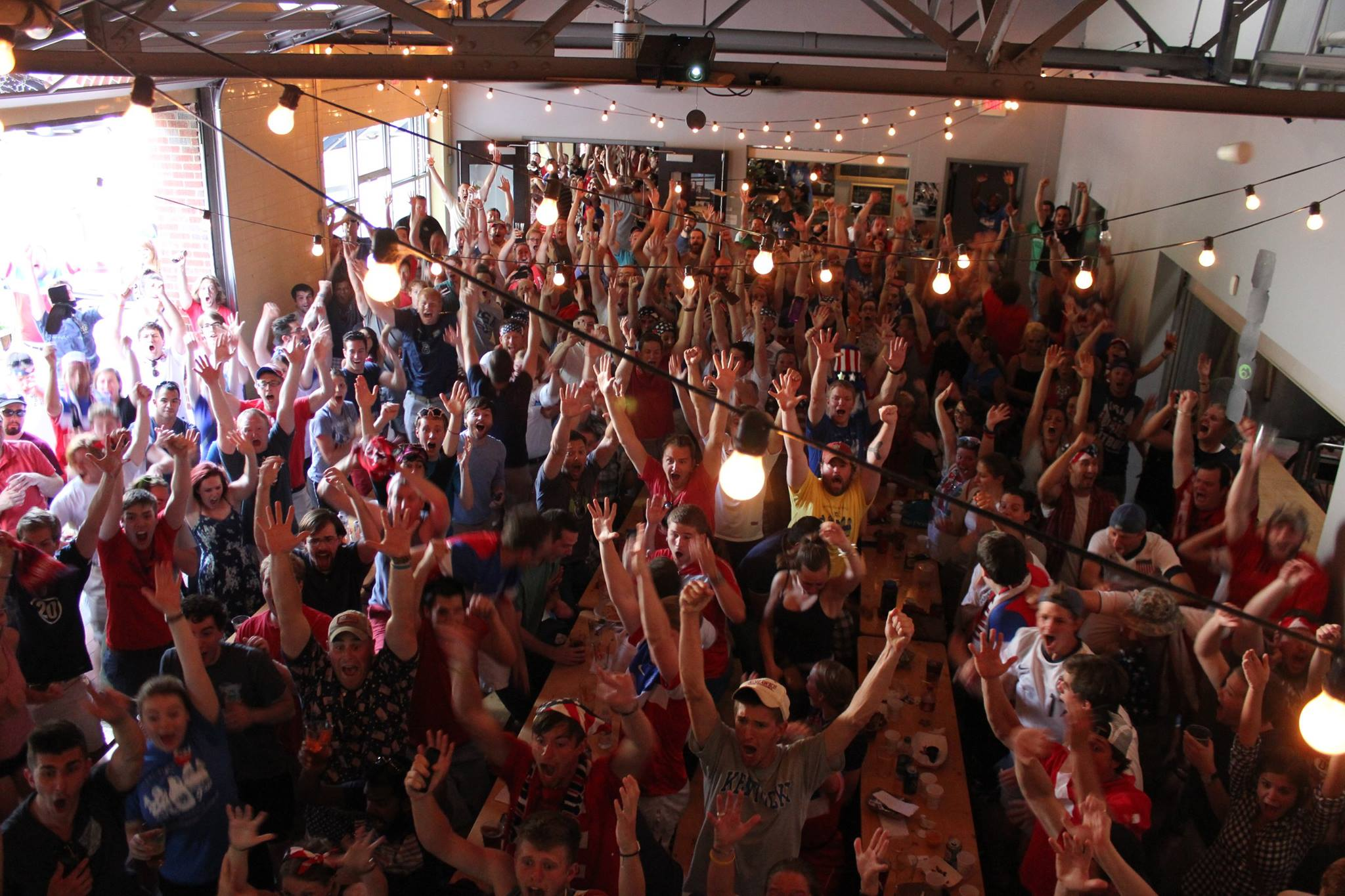
The American Outlaws Lexington watch party

== See also ==
- Sam's Army
- United States men's national soccer team
