= Sam's Army =

Defunct U.S. soccer supporters' group

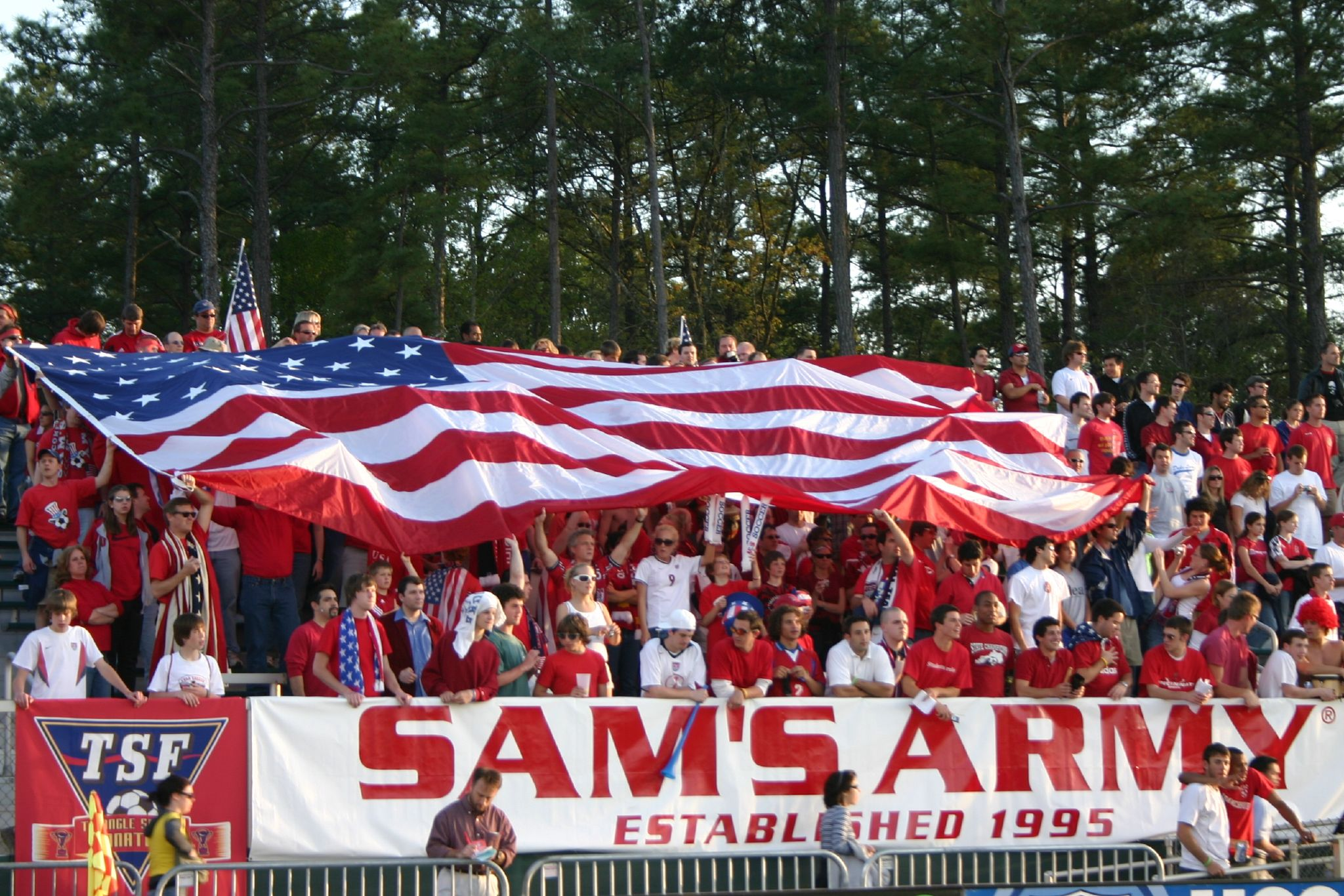
Sam's Army at the SAS Soccer Park in Cary for an international friendly against Jamaica.

Sam's Army was an unofficial supporters' group for the United States men's national soccer team. The name of the group derives from Uncle Sam, a national personification of the United States, and the Scottish supporters' group the Tartan Army. Sam's Army debuted at a 1995 U.S. Cup game following the 1994 FIFA World Cup. In 2010 there were more than 14,000 members of Sam's Army, and the organization reported having members around the world. Sam's Army was known for wearing all red and usually standing behind a goal during United States national team matches. George Vecsey of The New York Times described Sam's Army as, "a relative handful of goofy characters in red outfits... who follow the American team around the globe." The American Outlaws are now the dominant U.S. soccer supporters' group and Sam's Army is now defunct.

== History ==
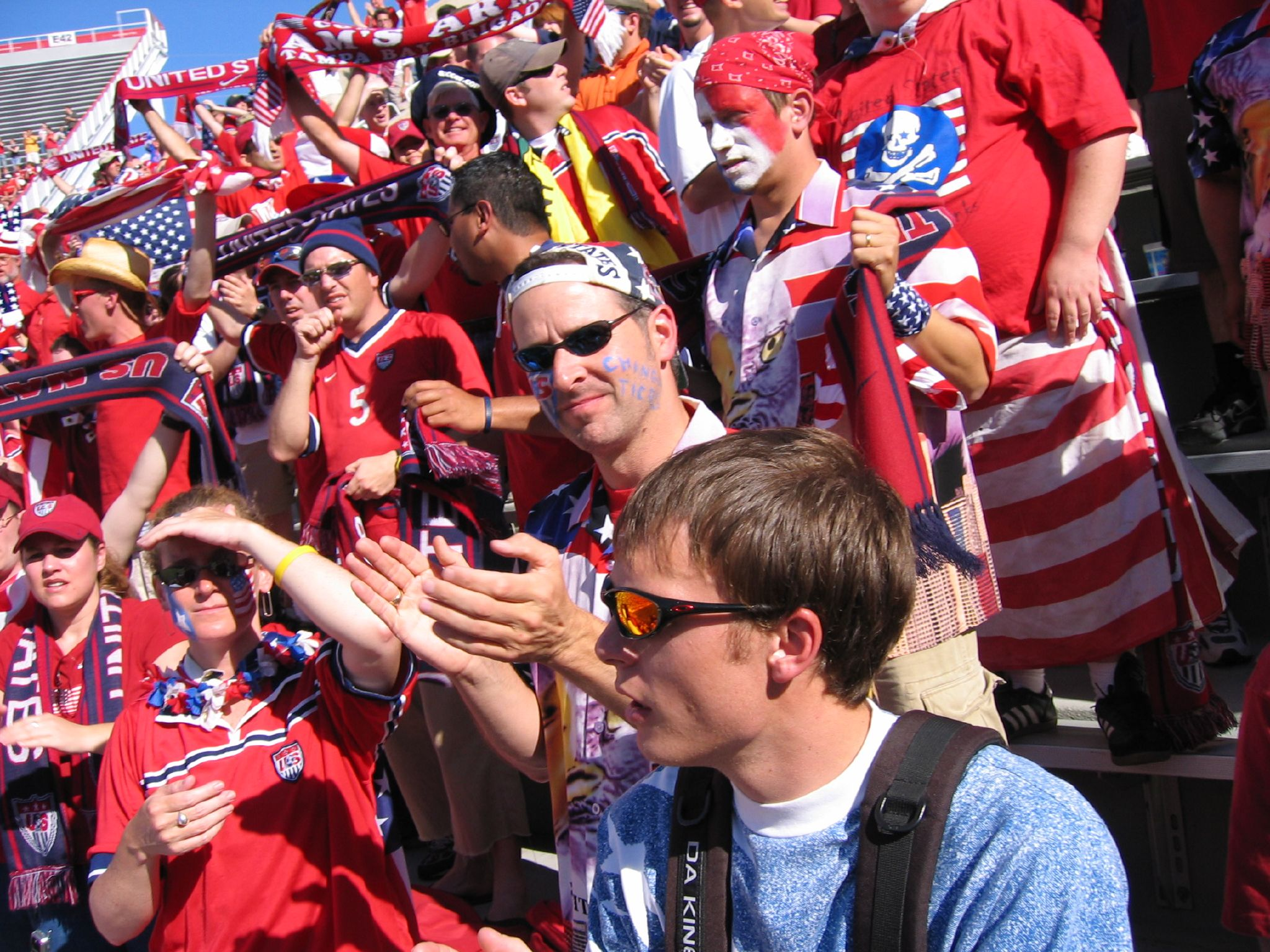
Sam's Army at the Rice–Eccles Stadium in Salt Lake City for a 2006 FIFA World Cup qualifying match against Costa Rica.

Sam's Army was co-founded by Mark Spacone and John Wright. Spacone met Mark Wheeler, who ran a World Cup website, and decided that they should create a United States national team fan club. Wheeler left to go overseas and Wright stepped in as the other co-founder. Together they laid the groundwork for Sam's Army using Wheeler's website. According to the Sam's Army website, Sam's Army was inspired by the Scotland national team's supporter group, the Tartan Army, which they felt was an ideal to aim for as a supporter group.

Sam's Army's first organized debut was at a United States vs. Nigeria U.S. Cup match on June 11, 1995, at Foxboro Stadium; after winning that year's U.S. Cup, the United States' coach Steve Sampson called the group "the best fans in the country right now for the game of soccer", and Alexi Lalas threw the group his jersey in celebration of their U.S. Cup victory and to show his thanks for their support. The group originated due to a lack of an organized soccer supporters' club in the United States. Sam's Army notified fans by e-mail during the 2002 FIFA World Cup to let them know which bars would be showing the United States team's World Cup matches. Over 4,000 Sam's Army members gathered at Robert F. Kennedy Memorial Stadium to watch the United States play Germany in the 2002 World Cup. George Vecsey of The New York Times noted that Sam's Army followed the United States team wherever they went for qualifying matches in 2004.

At the United States team's opening game of the 2010 World Cup in group play against England, there were an estimated 8,000 members of Sam's Army in the stands, and Sam's Army chanted U-S-A! after each save made by Tim Howard, the American goalkeeper. Tim Struby of ESPN the Magazine noted in May 2010 that Sam's Army continues to grow in size, and on June 11, 2010, Sam's Army and the American Outlaws appeared on a segment of The Daily Show with Jon Stewart, where they gave the finger to John Oliver after he gave them the finger.

== Behavior ==
Sam's Army was known for wearing red to matches. The group's chants are commonly bilingual in English and Spanish due to the number of soccer fans coming from the Hispanic community. They usually stand in seatings behind one of the goals, due to complaints from early games that they blocked people who wanted to sit down and watch the game. Sam's Army fans often utilize drummers in their chants, and there are chant leaders who lead the group for the duration of the game. They normally stood with other United States national team supporters' groups, including the American Outlaws.

Sam's Army also produced a bi-monthly fanzine, 'Bookable Offense' which started in 1995. Each issue, which ran between 16 and 30 pages, was distributed by mail to group members. The fanzine, written by Wheeler and Spacone, also included articles on the newly formed Major League Soccer with references and information on burgeoning MLS Supporters clubs.

== See also ==
- The American Outlaws
- United States men's national soccer team
